= 2011 Little League World Series =

Children's baseball tournament

Tournament details
- Dates: August 18–28, 2011
- Teams: 16

Final positions
- Champions: Ocean View Little League (United States) Huntington Beach, California
- Runners-up: Hamamatsu Minami Little League (Shizuoka Prefecture) Hamamatsu City, Shizuoka, Japan

The 2011 Little League World Series took place in South Williamsport, Pennsylvania, between August 18 and 28. Eight teams from the United States and eight from elsewhere in the world competed in the 65th edition of the Little League World Series. Ocean View Little League of Huntington Beach, California, defeated Hamamatsu Minami Little League of Hamamatsu City, Japan, in the championship game. Nick Pratto hit an RBI single to clinch the title for Ocean View.

== Tournament changes ==
On June 16, 2011, Little League announced that it was modifying the double-elimination format that was first used in the previous year's tournament. The format of four pools consisting of four teams in each pool, a format that had been used since the tournament expanded to 16 teams in 2001, was eliminated. Instead, the eight teams from the United States were placed into one bracket, and the eight International teams into another bracket. The tournament remained double-elimination until the United States and International championship games, where it became single-elimination.

Little League International renewed deals with uniform suppliers Russell Athletic and New Era Caps. As part of the deal, regions had new color schemes this year.

== Teams ==
United States	International
La Grange, Kentucky; Great Lakes Region; North Oldham Little League	Kaohsiung, Chinese Taipei; Asia-Pacific Region; Ching-Tan Little League
Clinton County, Pennsylvania; Mid-Atlantic Region; Keystone Little League	Langley, British Columbia; Canada Region; Langley Little League
Rapid City, South Dakota; Midwest Region; Harney Little League	Oranjestad, Aruba; Caribbean Region; Aruba North Little League
Cumberland, Rhode Island; New England Region; Cumberland American Little League	Rotterdam, Netherlands; Europe Region; Rotterdam Little League
Billings, Montana; Northwest Region; Big Sky Little League	(Shizuoka Prefecture) Hamamatsu, Shizuoka; Japan Region; Hamamatsu Minami Little League
(Georgia (U.S. state)) Warner Robins, Georgia; Southeast Region; Warner Robins American Little League	Maracay, Venezuela; Latin America Region; Gran Maracay Little League
Lafayette, Louisiana; Southwest Region; Lafayette Little League	Mexicali, Baja California; Mexico Region; Segura Social Little League
Huntington Beach, California; West Region; Ocean View Little League	Dhahran, Saudi Arabia^{[a]} Middle East-Africa Region; Arabian American Little League

- Taiwan participates under the name Chinese Taipei in many sporting events, including Little League Baseball (LLB).
- Of the 16 teams, 11 made their first LLWS appearance. Most notable among these was the Keystone Little League, based less than 30 miles (48 km) from Little League headquarters. The last LLWS to feature a team from the immediate Williamsport area was the 1969 edition. Keystone's game on August 19 against the North Oldham Little League set an attendance record for Howard J. Lamade Stadium, at 41,848. The record stood until it was broken during the 2015 event.
- The Big Sky Little League team from Billings was the first team from Montana to win a regional and advance to the Little League World Series. They compiled a 3–1 record at the tournament before falling to the eventual tournament champions from Huntington Beach, California. Montana was scheduled to play the team from Tijuana, Mexico in the third place game but it was canceled due to the threat of Hurricane Irene in the latter stages of the tournament.

== Results ==
=== United States bracket ===
Upper round 1	Upper round 2	Upper final	Final
August 18 – Game 2
Montana	6
August 21 – Game 14
South Dakota	4
Montana	3
August 18 – Game 4
Louisiana	1
(Georgia (U.S. state)) Georgia	0
August 24 – Game 24 (F/7)
Louisiana	2
Montana	1
August 19 – Game 6
California	0
Rhode Island	0
August 21 – Game 15 (F/4)
California	11
California	10
August 19 – Game 7
Kentucky	0
Kentucky	1	August 27 – U.S. championship
Pennsylvania	0	Montana	2
California	11
Lower round 1	Lower round 2	Lower round 3	Lower final
August 22 – Game 18 (F/9)
August 20 – Game 10	Kentucky	5	August 25 – Game 26
South Dakota	3	Georgia	8	August 23 – Game 22	California	2
Georgia	6	Georgia	5	Pennsylvania	0
August 22 – Game 20 (F/4)	Pennsylvania	7
August 20 – Game 12	Pennsylvania	10
Rhode Island	0	Louisiana	0
Pennsylvania	2

=== International bracket ===
Upper round 1	Upper round 2	Upper final	Final
August 18 – Game 1
Chinese Taipei	0
August 21 – Game 13 (F/7)
Mexico	3
Mexico	3
August 18 – Game 3 (F/4)
Japan	2
Aruba	1
August 24 – Game 23 (F/9)
Japan	12
Mexico	2
August 19 – Game 5
Venezuela	1
Saudi Arabia	5
August 21 – Game 16
Canada	6
Canada	0
August 19 – Game 8
Venezuela	8
Netherlands	1	August 27 – Intl. Championship
Venezuela	6	Mexico	2
Japan	5
Lower round 1	Lower round 2	Lower round 3	Lower final
August 22 – Game 17
August 20 – Game 9 (F/4)	Canada	5	August 25 – Game 25
Chinese Taipei	20	Chinese Taipei	3	August 23 – Game 21	Venezuela	6
Aruba	3	Canada	0	Japan	9
August 22 – Game 19	Japan	4
August 20 – Game 11	Japan	13
Saudi Arabia	4	Saudi Arabia	4
Netherlands	2

=== Crossover games ===
Teams that lost their first two games played a crossover game against a team from the other side of the bracket that also lost its first two games. These games were labeled Game A and Game B. This provided teams who were already eliminated the opportunity to play a third game.

Game A
August 22 – Lamade Stadium
Aruba	5
South Dakota	0

Game B
August 23 – Lamade Stadium
Netherlands	7
Rhode Island	8

=== World Championship ===
Little League World Championship
August 28 – Lamade Stadium
California	2
Japan	1

2011 Little League World Series Champions
Ocean View Little League
Huntington Beach, California

The consolation game between Montana and Mexico was cancelled due to the expected arrival of Hurricane Irene.

== Middle East-Africa qualification ==
Kampala, Uganda defeated Dhahran, Saudi Arabia in the Middle East-Africa Region Final but the Ugandan team was denied visas by the State Department. Reportedly, the visas were denied because some players provided false information, specifically related to their ages. The runner-up, Saudi Arabia, was invited to the Little League World Series in their spot.

== Champions path ==
The Ocean View Little League won 18 games and lost 1 game to reach the Little League World Series. Overall, their record was 23–2. Their two losses came against Rancho Mission Viejo LL (from California), and Billings Big Sky LL (from Montana).

Round	Opposition	Result
District 62
Winner's Bracket Quarterfinals	(California) Costa Mesa National LL	6-0
Winner's Bracket Semifinals	(California) Costa Mesa American LL	19-0
Winner's Bracket Final	(California) Huntington Valley LL	7-1
District 62 Championship	(California) Huntington Valley LL	13-3
Section 10
Game 1	(California) Aliso Viejo LL	5–4
Game 2	(California) Rancho Mission Viejo LL	2–1
Game 3	(California) Rancho Mission Viejo LL	5–6 (8 inn.)
Section 10 Championship	(California) Rancho Mission Viejo LL	3–1
South California Divisional
Winner's Bracket Semifinals	(California) Fontana Community LL	13-2 (4 inn.)
Winner's Bracket Finals	(California) Canyon Springs LL	5–1
South Sub-Divisional Championship	(California) Park View LL	5–4
South Championship	(California) Encino LL	12–1 (4 inn.)
South Championship	(California) Encino LL	11–1
West Regional
Group Stage	(California) Red Bluff LL	10–2
Group Stage	(Hawaii) Central East Maui LL	3–0
Group Stage	(Arizona) Rio Rico LL	10–0 (4 inn.)
Group Stage	(Nevada) Silverado LL	11–3
Semifinals	(Utah) Washington LL	5–0
West Region Championship	(California) Red Bluff LL	2–1

== Notable players ==
=== Major League Baseball ===
- Hagen Danner (Huntington Beach, California) - pitcher
- Yonny Hernández (Maracaibo, Venezuela) - infielder
- Nick Pratto (Huntington Beach, California) - infielder

=== National Football League ===
- Jake Fromm (Warner Robins, Georgia) - quarterback in the National Football League
