= 2019 Little League World Series =

Children's baseball tournament

Tournament details
- Dates: August 15–August 25
- Teams: 16

Final positions
- Champions: (United States) Eastbank Little League, River Ridge, Louisiana
- Runners-up: Pabao Little League, Willemstad, Curaçao

The 2019 Little League World Series was held from August 15 to August 25 at the Little League headquarters complex in South Williamsport, Pennsylvania. Eight teams from the United States and eight teams from around the world competed in the 73rd edition of the Little League World Series. Eastbank Little League of River Ridge, Louisiana, defeated Pabao Little League of Willemstad, Curaçao, in the championship game by an 8–0 score.

This was the first championship for a team from Louisiana, and in doing so, they became the first team to win the championship after losing its first game since the tournament expanded to 16 teams in 2001. With a team from Honolulu having won the 2018 championship, this was the first time U.S. teams won consecutive titles since 2008 and 2009.

== Tournament changes ==
Among the changes made by the Little League International Board of Directors to the rules, regulations, and policies of Little League was introduction of a rule concerning tied games. Should a game complete seven innings with the score still tied, the offensive team in each subsequent half-inning will start with a runner placed on second base. The runner is the player in the team's batting order who is scheduled to bat last in the half-inning.

== Teams ==
Regional qualifying tournaments were held from June to August 2019.

United States	International
(Kentucky) Bowling Green, Kentucky; Great Lakes Region; Bowling Green Eastern Little League	(South Korea) Chungcheong, South Korea; Asia-Pacific and Middle East Region; Chung Nam (B) Little League
Elizabeth, New Jersey; Mid-Atlantic Region; Elmora Youth Little League	Sydney, New South Wales; Australia Region; Cronulla Little League
(Minnesota) Coon Rapids, Minnesota; Midwest Region; Coon Rapids Andover American Little League	Coquitlam, British Columbia; Canada Region; Coquitlam Little League
(Rhode Island) Barrington, Rhode Island; New England Region; Barrington Little League	(Curaçao) Willemstad, Curaçao; Caribbean Region; Pabao Little League
(Oregon) Salem, Oregon; Northwest Region; Sprague Little League	(Italy) Bologna, Italy; Europe and Africa Region; Emilia Romagna Little League
(Virginia) South Riding, Virginia; Southeast Region; Loudoun South Little League	Tokyo; Japan Region; Chofu Little League
(Louisiana) River Ridge, Louisiana; Southwest Region; Eastbank Little League	(Venezuela) Maracaibo, Venezuela; Latin America Region; Cacique Mara Little League
(Hawaii) Wailuku, Hawaii; West Region; Central East Maui Little League	Guadalupe, Nuevo León; Mexico Region; Epitacio Mala Torres Little League

== Results ==
The draw to determine the opening round pairings took place on June 13, 2019.

=== United States bracket ===
Upper round 1	Upper round 2	Upper final	Final
August 16 – Game 2
Rhode Island	0
August 18 – Game 14 (F/4)
Virginia	3
Virginia	11
August 16 – Game 4
Minnesota	0
Minnesota	2
August 21 – Game 24
Kentucky	1
Virginia	9
August 16 – Game 6
Hawaii	12
Hawaii	5
August 18/19 – Game 16
Louisiana	2
Hawaii	6
August 16 – Game 8
New Jersey	0
Oregon	2	August 24 – U.S. championship
New Jersey	6	Hawaii	5
Louisiana	9
Lower round 1	Lower round 2	Lower round 3	Lower final
August 20 – Game 18
August 17 – Game 10	New Jersey	2	August 22 – Game 26 (F/5)
Rhode Island	6	Rhode Island	0	August 21 – Game 22	Virginia	0
Kentucky	1	New Jersey	1	Louisiana	10
August 19 – Game 20 (F/4)	Louisiana	4
August 17 – Game 12	Minnesota	0
Louisiana	3	Louisiana	10
Oregon	2

=== International bracket ===
Upper round 1	Upper round 2	Upper final	Final
August 15 – Game 1 (F/4)
Curaçao	11
August 18 – Game 13
Australia	0
Curaçao	0
August 16 – Game 3
South Korea	4
South Korea	10
August 21 – Game 23
Venezuela	3
South Korea	2
August 16 – Game 5 (F/5)
Japan	7
Japan	20
August 18 – Game 15
Italy	0
Japan	5
August 16 – Game 7
Mexico	0
Mexico	5	August 24 – International championship
Canada	0	Japan	4
Curaçao	5
Lower round 1	Lower round 2	Lower round 3	Lower final
August 19 – Game 17
August 17 – Game 9	Mexico	7	August 22 – Game 25
Australia	0	Venezuela	8	August 20 – Game 21	South Korea	3
Venezuela	2	Venezuela	2	Curaçao	5
August 19 – Game 19	Curaçao	9
August 17 – Game 11 (F/4)	Curaçao	8
Italy	0	Canada	1
Canada	10

=== Crossover games ===
Teams that lost their first two games played a crossover game against a team from the other side of the bracket that also lost its first two games. These games were labeled Game A and Game B. This provided teams who were already eliminated the opportunity to play a third game. This was the last LLWS to have these games.

Game A
August 19 – Volunteer Stadium
Kentucky	4
Australia	1

Game B
August 20 – Lamade Stadium
Italy	3
Oregon	4

=== Third place game ===
This consolation game is played between the runner-up of the United States championship and the runner-up of the International championship.

Third place game
August 25 – Lamade Stadium
Hawaii	0
Japan	5

=== World Championship ===
Little League World Championship
August 25 – Lamade Stadium
Louisiana	8
Curaçao	0

2019 Little League World Series Champions
Eastbank Little League
River Ridge, Louisiana

== Champions path ==
The Eastbank LL reached the LLWS with an undefeated record in nine games. In total, their record was 15–1.

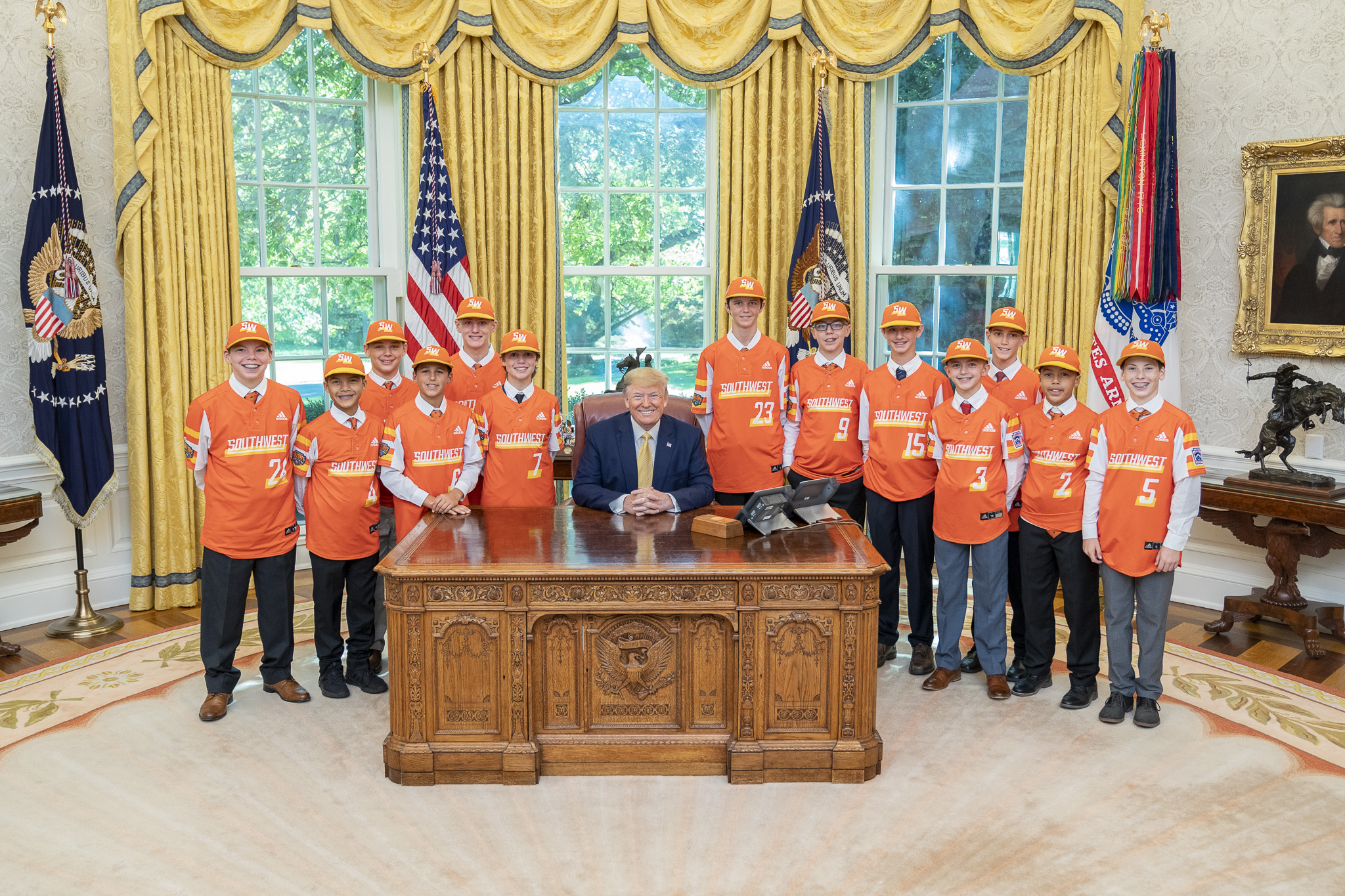
The Eastbank Little League team with President Donald Trump in October 2019

Round	Opposition	Result
Louisiana State Tournament
Winner's Bracket Semifinals	Lafayette LL	16–0
Winner's Bracket Final	South Lake Charles LL	14–0
Finals	South Lake Charles LL	16–0 (F/3)
Southwest Regional Tournament
Opening Round	(Arkansas) White Hall LL	11–0 (F/4)
Winner's Bracket Semifinal	(Texas) Post Oak LL	4–1
Winner's Bracket Final	(Texas) Midland Northern LL	6–5
Finals	(Texas) Midland Northern LL	6–2

== Notable players ==
- Sean Duncan, drafted by the New York Yankees in the 2026 Major League Baseball draft. (Coquitlam, British Columbia)
- Tim Piasentin, drafted by the Toronto Blue Jays in the 2025 Major League Baseball draft. (Coquitlam, British Columbia)

== MLB Little League Classic ==
On August 19, 2018, it was announced that the third MLB Little League Classic would be played on August 18, 2019, at BB&T Ballpark at Historic Bowman Field, featuring the Chicago Cubs and the Pittsburgh Pirates. The Pirates made their second appearance in the annual game, having won the inaugural Classic in 2017. The game was won by the Cubs, 7–1.
