= Little League World Series =

Annual children's baseball tournament

Coordinates: 41.23°N 76.98°W

- Current season, competition or edition: 2026 Little League World Series
- Sport: Baseball
- Founded: 1947, 79 years ago
- No. of teams: 20
- Countries: International
- Most recent champions: Pariba Little League, Willemstad, Curaçao (2026)
- Most titles: Kitasuna Little League, Tokyo, Japan (4)
- Website: LittleLeague.org

Location in the United States
Location in Pennsylvania

The Little League World Series is an annual baseball tournament by Little League Baseball for children (primarily boys) aged 10 to 12 years old, held in South Williamsport, Pennsylvania. Originally called the National Little League Tournament, it was later renamed for the World Series in Major League Baseball. The Series was first held in 1947 and is held every August in South Williamsport, Pennsylvania; while the postal address of the organization is in Williamsport, the Series itself is played at Howard J. Lamade Stadium and Volunteer Stadium at the Little League headquarters complex in South Williamsport.

Initially, only teams from the United States competed in the Series, but it has since become a worldwide tournament. The tournament has gained popular renown, especially in the United States, where games from the Series and even from regional tournaments are broadcast on ESPN. Teams from the United States have won a plurality of the series, although from 1969 to 1991 teams from Taiwan dominated the series, winning in 15 out of those 23 years. From 2010 through 2017, teams from Japan similarly dominated the series, winning five of those matchups.

While the Little League Baseball World Series is frequently referred to as just the Little League World Series, it is actually one of seven World Series tournaments sponsored by Little League International, in different locations. Each of them brings community teams from different Little League International regions around the world together in baseball (four age divisions) and girls' softball (three age divisions). The tournament structure described here is that used for the Little League Baseball World Series. The structure used for the other World Series is similar, but with different regions.

== Qualifying tournaments ==
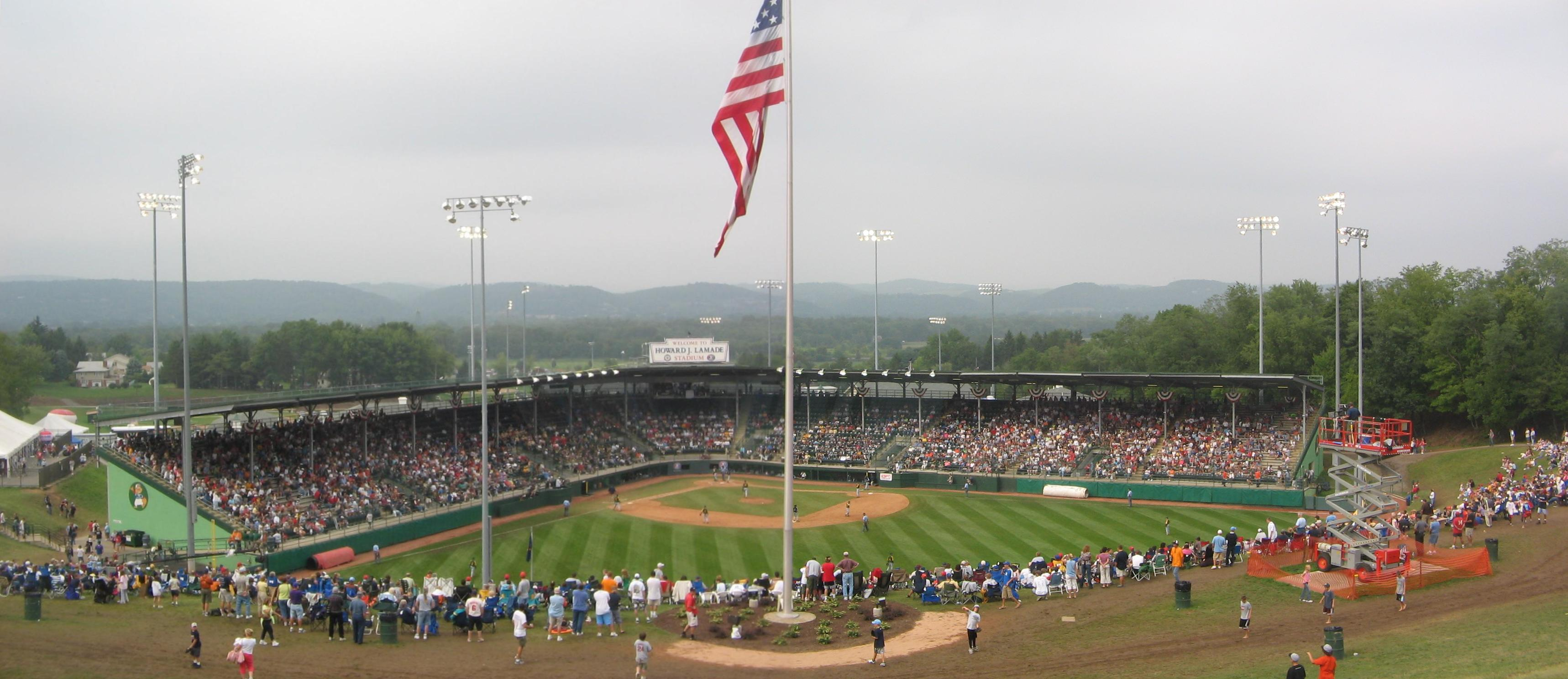
A Little League World Series game at Howard J. Lamade Stadium in 2007

In the summer months leading up to the Little League World Series, held each year in August, Little Leagues around the world select All-Star teams made up of players from each league. It is these All-Star teams that compete in district, sectional and/or divisional, and regional tournaments, hoping to advance to Williamsport for the Little League World Series. How many games a team has to play varies from region to region. In the United States, the tournaments at the lowest (district) level lack nationwide standardization. Some use pool play or double elimination, while others use single elimination.

In the United States, the fate of district winners varies widely from state to state. In some larger states such as Pennsylvania, New York, and California, the district winners advance to one of many sectional tournaments. The winners of each sectional tournament then advance to a state or divisional tournament, the latter only being held in Texas and California and are similar to the state tournaments held in less populous states. Most smaller states lack competition at the sectional level and go straight from district to state tournaments. A handful of states are composed of only one district, and the district champion is the automatic state champion.

With two exceptions, every state as well as the District of Columbia crowns a state champion, and sends that team to represent it to one of ten regional tournaments. The exceptions involve California and Texas. Because of their large geographic and population sizes, California and Texas send two representatives to their regional tournament; Northern California and Southern California in the West region tournament and Texas East and Texas West (whose areas encompass more than the geographical areas of East Texas and West Texas, splitting roughly along the I-35/I-37 corridor) compete in the Southwest region tournament. Up through 2018, the Dakotas had one district spanning the two states, and its winner became the joint champion when advancing to the Midwest region tournament. However, beginning in 2019, North Dakota and South Dakota are represented by individual teams in the regional tournament — creating an odd number of teams first in the Midwest Regional and then (beginning in 2022) in the Great Lakes Regional.

The state champions (as well as the Northern California, Southern California, Texas East, Texas West, and District of Columbia teams) compete in one of ten different regional tournaments (increasing from 8 in 2022). Each regional tournament winner then advances to the Little League World Series. A comprehensive breakdown of current and historical US regional tournament locations, participants and results is available online. Since the geographical boundaries of the District of Columbia are exactly the same as the capital city of Washington, this District is usually identified specifically as "Washington, DC."

Other countries and regions pick their own way of crowning a champion. Little League Canada holds tournaments at the provincial and divisional level to field six champions (four provincial and two divisional) at the national tournament: Alberta, Ontario, Quebec, British Columbia, the Prairie Provinces (Saskatchewan and Manitoba), and the Atlantic Provinces (New Brunswick, Newfoundland and Labrador, Nova Scotia, and Prince Edward Island). The host site of the national tournament varies from year to year, and the host team gets an automatic berth as the seventh team. The tournament is played as a round robin and uses the Page playoff format. The winner of the national tournament earns the right to represent Canada at the Little League World Series.

=== Regions ===
Beginning with the 2022 tournament, 10 regional tournament winners compete in the United States bracket of the Little League World Series. The states those regional champions could possibly hail from are as listed below using U.S. state abbreviations. There are 53 total U.S. entrants that compete in the 10 regional tournaments: two from Texas, two from California, one each from the remaining 48 U.S. states, and one from the District of Columbia.

- Great Lakes (IL, IN, KY, MI, OH)
- Metro (CT, NJ, NY, RI)
- Mid-Atlantic (DE, DC, MD, PA)
- Midwest (IA, KS, MN, MO, NE, ND, SD, WI)
- Mountain (CO, MT, NV, UT, WY)
- New England (ME, MA, NH, VT)
- Northwest (AK, ID, OR, WA)
- Southeast (AL, FL, GA, NC, SC, TN, VA, WV)
- Southwest (AR, LA, MS, NM, OK, TX East, TX West)
- West (AZ, Northern CA, Southern CA, HI)

There are eight international divisions, which provide 10 teams to the international bracket of the tournament. This is due to Cuba, Curaçao, Panama, and Puerto Rico receiving automatic bids to the LLWS on a rotating basis—annually, two teams receive a bid while the others play through their regional tournament (Cuba, Curaçao, or Puerto Rico through the Caribbean region; Panama through Latin America region).

- Asia-Pacific and Middle East
- Australia
- Canada
- Caribbean
- Europe and Africa
- Japan
- Latin America
- Mexico

The above regions reflect various historical realignments, including those implemented in 2013 and 2022. Historical detail is provided in articles about the individual regions.

Divisions which compete in the United States bracket represent 96% of worldwide players in Little League with over 2.2 million participants, while the divisions in the International bracket represent the remaining 4% (less than 130,000 participants).

== World Series tournament format ==
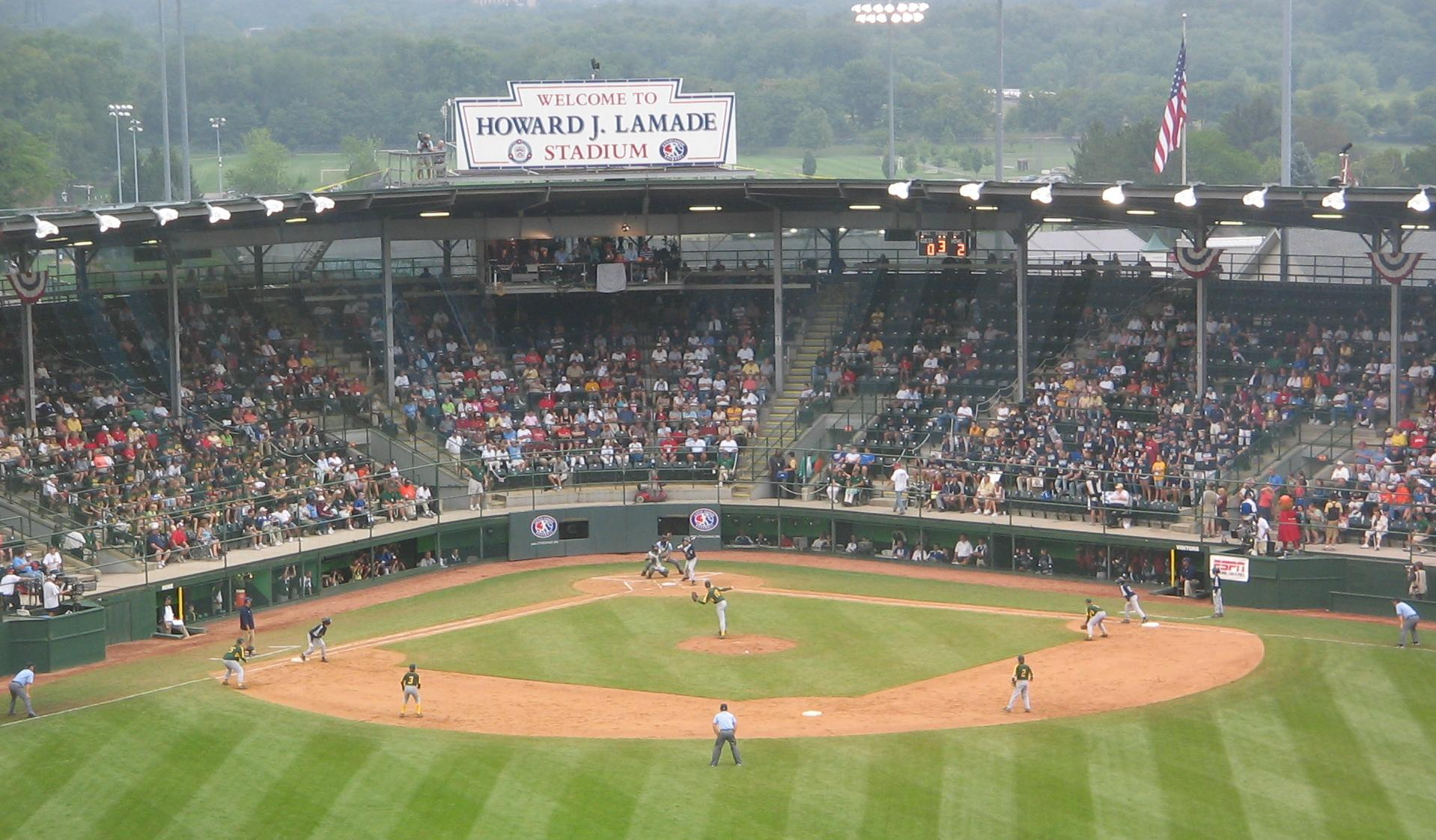
A Little League World Series Game at Howard J. Lamade Stadium in South Williamsport

Currently, the Little League World Series consists of 20 teams: 10 from the United States, and 10 from other countries. The U.S. and international teams play in separate brackets, in a double-elimination format. After two teams reach the U.S. championship (semifinal) and the international championship (semifinal), the tournament becomes single elimination; that is, a team losing one of the semifinal games, even if that team has lost only one game, cannot win the championship, but plays in a consolation game for third place. The winners of each bracket play each other for the LLWS championship game.

From the inaugural 1947 tournament through 1956, there were predominantly U.S.-based teams, usually eight, competing in a single-elimination format. One Canadian team played in 1952, and one in 1953. Regions were introduced in 1957, and that tournament included the first non-U.S. champion, Monterrey, Mexico, although they represented the U.S. South region. International regions were added in 1958. From 1962 through 2000, the eight teams in the tournament came from four U.S. and four international regions:

- United States: Central, East, South, West
- International: Canada, Europe, Far East, Latin America

Through 1975, all teams competed in one bracket. That year, the tournament was held with only the teams from the U.S. regions. The international teams returned in 1976, when two brackets were established, one with U.S. teams, and the other with international teams. The U.S. bracket winner and the international bracket winner would then meet in the championship game, an arrangement that has continued to the present, independent of subsequent changes made to early rounds of the tournament.

In 2001, the number of regions was doubled to 16. The tournament started with eight U.S. teams, randomly assigned into two four-team pools; and eight international teams, also randomly assigned into two four-team pools. Teams competed round-robin within their own pool, with the top two teams of each pool advancing to single-elimination play for a spot in the U.S. final or international final, followed by the U.S. champion and international champion meeting in the World Championship game.

In 2010, round-robin play was replaced by a double-elimination bracket in each four-team pool. The winners of each pool advanced to a single-elimination U.S. championship or international championship game, with those winners advancing to the World Championship game. Additionally, each team in the tournament played a minimum of three games, as any team that lost its first two games would play in a consolation U.S. vs. international game.

In 2011, pools were eliminated, with the eight U.S. teams continuing to compete in one bracket and the eight international teams in another bracket. The tournament is double-elimination until the U.S. championship and international championship games, which remain single-elimination, with those winners advancing to the World Championship game. Each team in the tournament still played a minimum of three games, via consolation games as noted above.

In August 2019, organizers announced that the tournament would expand to 20 teams in 2021, by adding two U.S. participants and two international participants. However, the expansion was delayed to 2022 due to the COVID-19 pandemic. As a consequence of this expansion, crossover consolations games that had previously been played between 0–2 teams have been eliminated.

Tournament Year	Number of teams	Notes
1947–1948	By invitation	
1949–2000	8	(Note: Only four teams participated in the 1957 and 1975 tournament, while only seven teams participated in the 1958, 1959 and 1963 tournament.)
2001–2021	16	(Note: No tournament was held in 2020. The sixteen teams participated in the 2021 tournament were all from the US.)
2022–present	20	

=== Venues ===
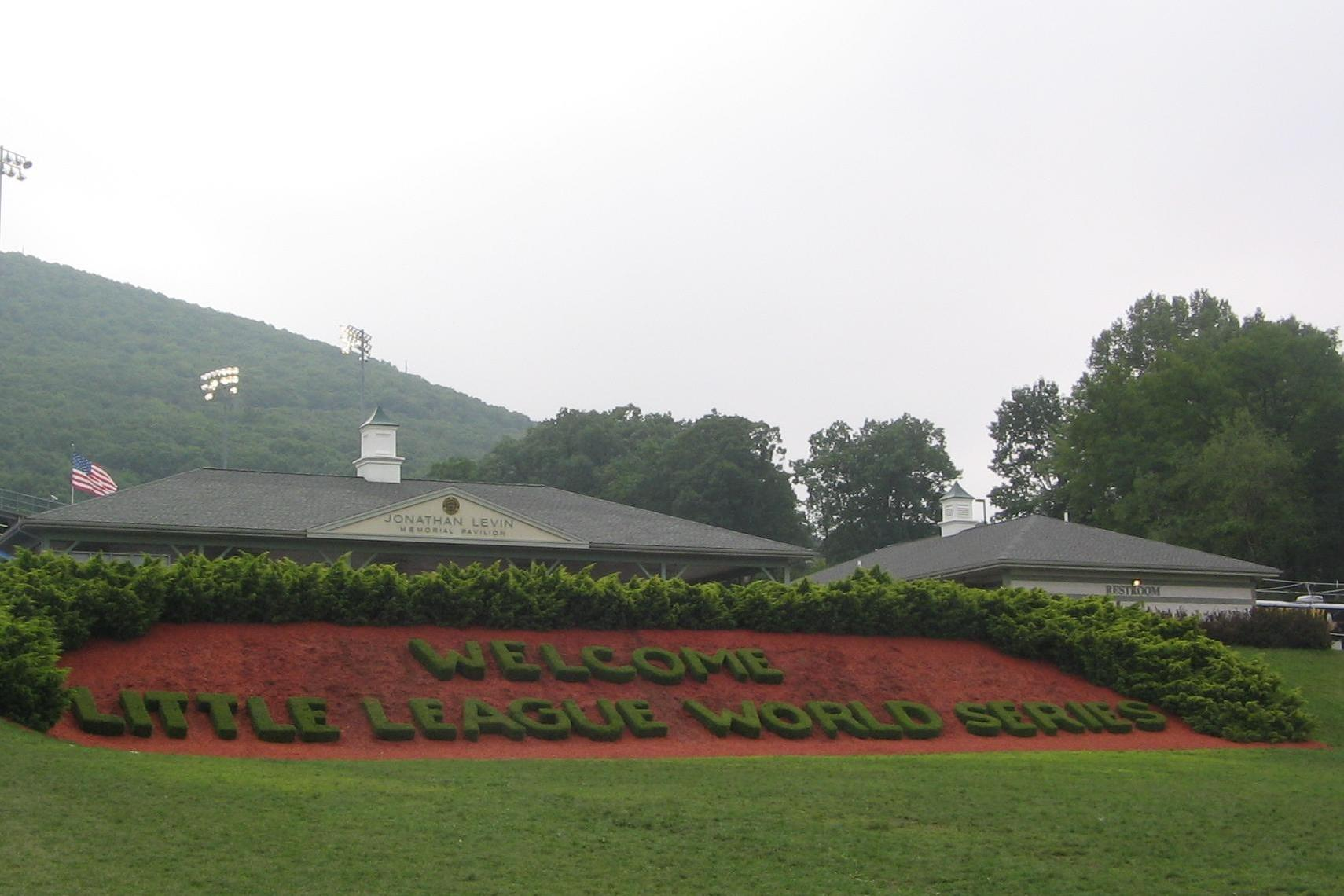
Welcome sign in the Little League World Series Complex

Two venues host World Series games: Howard J. Lamade Stadium and Little League Volunteer Stadium. Lamade Stadium has hosted games since 1959 and added lights in 1992. Volunteer Stadium opened in 2001 when the field expanded to 16 teams. Prior to 1959, the Little League World Series was held at Original Little League on West Fourth Street in Williamsport.

Both fields have symmetrical fences, with a distance of 68.6 m (225 feet) from home plate to each of the outfield positions. That distance had been 62.5 m (205 feet) before 2006.

Admission to all LLWS games is free for all spectators. However, stadium seats for the championship game are distributed in a random drawing of all interested parties due to high demand. Some early round games, mostly games with Pennsylvania teams, will use first-come, first-served admission if a big crowd is to be expected. Lamade Stadium has a berm beyond the fences that has allowed the facility to hold up to 45,000 spectators.

== Age requirements ==
From 1947 to 2005, the age limit for players was set at children who turned 13 on August 1 of that year or later. In 2006, the age limit was loosened to include players who turn 13 after April 30. As the Series takes place in August, this led to many of the players having already turned 13 before the Series started. In 2014 Little League voted to change the age cutoff from April 30 to December 31. However, this caused outrage by parents because the players born between May 1 and August 31, 2005, would have lost their 12-year-old season because they would be considered to be 13 years old even though they have not reached their 13th birthday. Effective November 2015, a new implementation plan was established, which "grandfathered" players born between May 1 and August 31, 2005, as 12-year-olds for the 2018 season, using April 30 age determination date for the 2018 season. Since 2019, a new determination date of August 31 is used, banning 13-year-old players from participating in the Series.

== Girls in the tournament ==
Through the 2026 tournament, a total of 26 girls have participated in the Little League Baseball World Series:

Year	Name	State/Country
1984	Victoria Roche	Brussels, Belgium
1989	Victoria Brucker	San Pedro, California
1990	Kelly Craig	Trail, British Columbia
1991	Giselle Hardy	Dhahran, Saudi Arabia
1994	Krissy Wendell	Brooklyn Center, Minnesota
1998	Sayaka Tsushima	Kashima, Japan
1999	Alicia Hunolt	Ramstein Air Base, Germany
2001	Tatiana Maltseva	Moscow, Russia
2002	Sanoe Aina	Waipio, Hawaii
2003	Merced Flores	Hagåtña, Guam
2004	Meghan Sims	Owensboro, Kentucky
2004	Alexandra Bellini	Ottawa, Ontario
2008	Brielle Meno	Yona, Guam
2009	Katie Reyes	Vancouver, British Columbia
2009	Bryn Stonehouse	Dhahran, Saudi Arabia
2013	Eliska Stejsklova	Brno, Czech Republic
2014	Emma March	Vancouver, British Columbia
2014	Mo'ne Davis	Philadelphia, Pennsylvania
2019	Maddy Freking	Coon Rapids, Minnesota
2021	Ella Bruning	Abilene, Texas
2022	Falynn Randall	Santa Clara, Utah
2023	Stella Weaver	Nolensville, Tennessee
2024	Emma Gainsford	Sydney, New South Wales
2025	Monica Arcuri	Brisbane, Queensland
2026	Kinley Rasmus	Phenix City, Alabama
2026	Carsynn Meyer	Henderson, Nevada

== Noteworthy events ==
- 1952 – A team from Montreal, Canada, became the first team outside of the United States to play in the tournament.
- 1955 – The first walk-off home run in the championship game was hit by Rich Cominski, from Morrisville, Pennsylvania, in the 7th inning.
- 1957 – Monterrey, Mexico, only the third team from outside the United States to compete, became the first such team to win the tournament. Pitcher Ángel Macías threw a perfect game, which has not occurred in a championship game since.
- 1970 – This was the final tournament to have an all-US championship final, aside from later exceptions of 1975 and 2021 when only US-based teams competed.
- 1971 – Lloyd McClendon, from Gary, Indiana, hit five home runs in five official at bats over the span of three games. He was intentionally walked in his other five plate appearances.
- 1974 – The elimination game between Jackson, Tennessee and Maracaibo, Venezuela was the first scoreless game after six innings of regulation play. Venezuela won 1–0, with a walk off home run in the seventh inning.
- 1975 – International teams were banned from the tournament. After considerable criticism, the board of directors voted 12–1 to rescind the ban the following year.
- 1976 – International teams returned to the tournament, with US teams and non-US teams now placed on different sides of the tournament bracket.
- 1982 – Kirkland, Washington, won the championship over Chiayi County, Taiwan. This snapped a streak of 31 consecutive wins by Taiwanese teams at the LLWS, prompting the game's live announcer, Jim McKay, to declare it the biggest upset in the history of Little League.
- 1985 – Mexicali becomes the first team outside the United States to win the United States Little League Championship.
- 1993 – Long Beach, California, became the first team from the United States to win consecutive championships.
- 2005 – Michael Memea, from Ewa Beach, Hawaii, won the championship with a walk-off home run in the 7th inning.
- 2007 – Dalton Carriker, from Warner Robins, Georgia, hit a walk off home run in the 8th inning in the championship game.
- 2011 – Future Major Leaguer Nick Pratto of Huntington Beach, California hit a walk-off single to defeat Hamamatsu, Japan
- 2012 – A team from Lugazi, Uganda, became the first team from Africa to play in the tournament.
- 2016 – The team from Maine–Endwell, New York, completed an undefeated season (24–0) by defeating Seoul for the championship, giving South Korea its first loss in a LLWS championship game.
- 2020 – For the first time in its history, the tournament was canceled, due to impact of the COVID-19 pandemic.
- 2021 – For the first time since 1975, the tournament was restricted to US-based teams, due to continued impact of the COVID-19 pandemic.
- 2023 – Louis Lappe, from El Segundo, California, hit a walk off home run in the 6th inning in the championship game.

== Little League World Series champions ==
=== Championship tally ===
==== Championships won by country/state ====
Rank	Team	Titles	Years
–	United States	40	1947, 1948, 1949, 1950, 1951, 1952, 1953, 1954, 1955, 1956, 1959, 1960, 1961, 1962, 1963, 1964, 1965, 1966, 1970, 1975, 1982, 1983, 1989, 1992, 1993, 1998, 2002, 2005, 2006, 2007, 2008, 2009, 2011, 2016, 2018, 2019, 2021, 2022, 2023, 2024
1	Taiwan	18	1969, 1971, 1972, 1973, 1974, 1977, 1978, 1979, 1980, 1981, 1986, 1987, 1988, 1990, 1991, 1995, 1996, 2025
2	Japan	11	1967, 1968, 1976, 1999, 2001, 2003, 2010, 2012, 2013, 2015, 2017
3	California	8	1961, 1962, 1963, 1992‡, 1993, 2009, 2011, 2023
4	Pennsylvania	4	1947, 1948, 1955, 1960
4	Connecticut	4	1951, 1952, 1965, 1989
4	New Jersey	4	1949, 1970, 1975, 1998
4	Hawaii	4	2005, 2008, 2018, 2022
8	Mexico	3	1957, 1958, 1997
8	(Georgia (U.S. state)) Georgia	3	1983, 2006, 2007
8	South Korea	3	1984, 1985, 2014
8	New York	3	1954, 1964, 2016
12	Texas	2	1950, 1966
12	Venezuela	2	1994, 2000
12	Michigan	2	1959, 2021
12	Curaçao	2	2004, 2026
16	Alabama	1	1953
16	New Mexico	1	1956
16	(Washington (state)) Washington	1	1982
16	Kentucky	1	2002
16	Louisiana	1	2019
16	Florida	1	2024

==== Championship notes ====
- In November 1974, "whispers about overage Asian participants grew to shouts" when over a three-year stretch Taiwan outscored U.S. teams, 120–2, in a span of nine Little League World Series games. Then LLWS chairman Peter McGovern reluctantly agreed to a blanket ban of all international teams. After an uproar of criticism and an investigation that could produce no evidence of rules violations, the ban was rescinded for the 1976 event.
- In 1976, the tournament was split into two brackets; one for International teams, and one for teams representing the United States. As a result, a team representing the United States is assured of being in the finals each year.
- In 1985, Mexicali, Mexico, represented the West Region of the United States in the Little League World Series. Because of its proximity to the El Centro/Calexico area in Southern California, Mexicali competed in and represented California's District 22 in the Southern California division from 1957 to 1985, representing the bordering city of Calexico, California.
- In 1992, Long Beach was declared a 6–0 winner after the international tournament committee determined that Zamboanga City had used ineligible players that were either not from within its city limits, over age, or both. The championship game was originally won by Zamboanga City, 15–4.
- From 1997 to 2002, no teams from Taiwan participated in the tournament. In 1997, the Taiwan Baseball Association decided its leagues would no longer charter with Little League. From the introduction of Far East teams in 1967 until after 1996, Taiwan had won 17 of a possible 30 championships and had been runner-up twice.

Due to complicated relations with the People's Republic of China, the Republic of China—commonly known as Taiwan—is recognized by the name Chinese Taipei by a majority of international organizations, including Little League Baseball. LLWS records and news accounts may use Republic of China, Taiwan, or Chinese Taipei to refer to the same entity.

- In 2001, Danny Almonte, a pitcher from the Bronx, New York, team representing the Mid-Atlantic Region, was discovered to not be eligible because he was two years over the maximum age limit. Because of this, the Mid-Atlantic team was retroactively assessed a forfeit for each game they won in the tournament. The team's statistics, including a perfect game thrown by Almonte, were scrubbed from the record.
- In 2009, a team from Taiwan reached the championship match for the first time since 1996, but lost to a team from Chula Vista, California.
- In 2014, Chicago defeated Las Vegas for the U.S. championship before losing to Seoul, South Korea, in the LLWS championship. On February 11, 2015, Chicago was stripped of its U.S. title for fielding ineligible players; it was retroactively awarded to Las Vegas.
- In 2019, River Ridge became the first team since the expansion to 16 teams in 2001, and the second team in tournament history, to win the LLWS after losing their first game of tournament play (the first such team was Maracaibo, Venezuela, winners of the 2000 tournament).

== Notable participants in the Little League World Series ==
=== Major League Baseball players ===
According to the official Little League website, as of 2024, there have been 72 MLB players who played in the LLWS.

- Wilson Álvarez – Venezuelan left-handed pitcher (1989–2005); 1982 LLWS (Maracaibo, Venezuela)
- Scott Bandura – American outfielder (2026–present); 2014 LLWS (Philadelphia, Pennsylvania)
- Jim Barbieri – American outfielder (1966); 1954 LLWS champion, runner up 1953 LLWS (Schenectady, New York). First player to play in an MLB World Series (1966) and a Little League World Series
- Jason Bay – Canadian-American left fielder (2003–2013); 1990 LLWS (Trail, British Columbia). Won 2004 National League (NL) Rookie of the Year
- Matthew Batten – American infielder (2022–present); 2008 LLWS (Shelton, Connecticut)
- Derek Bell – American infielder (1991–2001); 1980 runner-up & 1981 LLWS runner-up (Tampa, Florida). 1992 MLB World Series champion
- Cody Bellinger – American outfielder and first baseman (2017–present); 2007 LLWS (Chandler, Arizona)
- Leo Bernal – Panamanian catcher (2026–present); 2016 LLWS (Aguadulce, Panama)
- Christian Bethancourt – Panamanian catcher and first baseman (2013–present); 2004 LLWS (Panama City, Panama)
- Larvell Blanks – American infielder (1972–1980); 1962 LLWS) (Del Rio, Texas)
- Jim Brower – American pitcher (1999–2007); 1985 LLWS (Minnetonka, Minnesota)
- Sean Burroughs – American third baseman (2002–2012); 1992 & 1993 LLWS champions (Long Beach, California)
- Brett Callahan – American outfielder (2026–present); 2013 LLWS (Newark, Delaware).
- Kevin Cash – American catcher (2002–2010), manager for the Tampa Bay Rays (2015–present); 1989 LLWS (Tampa, Florida).
- Gavin Cecchini – American second baseman (2016–2017), 2006 LLWS (Lake Charles, Louisiana)
- Chin-Feng Chen – Taiwanese outfielder (2002–2005), 1990 LLWS champion (Tainan County, Taiwan); first Taiwanese-born player in MLB history
- Jeff Clement – American catcher and first baseman (2007–2012), 1996 LLWS (Marshalltown, Iowa)
- Michael Conforto – American outfielder (2015–present), 2004 LLWS, (Redmond, Washington)
- Billy Connors – American pitcher (1966–1968), 1954 LLWS champion (Schenectady, New York)
- David Cortés – Mexican pitcher (1999–2006), 1985 LLWS (Mexicali, Mexico) - represented the West region of the US
- Hagen Danner – American pitcher (2023–present), 2011 LLWS champion (Huntington Beach, California)
- Drew Ellis – American third baseman (2021–2023), 2008 LLWS (Jeffersonville, Indiana)
- Brian Esposito – American catcher (2007–2010), 1991 LLWS (Staten Island, New York)
- Stephen Fife – American pitcher (2012–2014), 1999 LLWS) (Boise, Idaho)
- Jeff Frazier – American outfielder (2010), 1995 LLWS (Toms River, New Jersey)
- Todd Frazier – American third baseman (2011–2021), 1998 LLWS champion (Toms River, New Jersey). 2015 MLB Home Run Derby champion
- Jace Fry – American pitcher (2017–2021), 2006 LLWS (Beaverton, Oregon)
- Ángel Genao – Dominican infielder (2026–present), 2017 LLWS (Santiago de los Caballeros, Dominican Republic)
- Randal Grichuk – American outfielder (2014–present), 2003 and 2004 LLWS (Richmond, Texas)
- Robert Hassell III – American outfielder (2025–present), 2013 and 2014 LLWS (Nashville, Tennessee)
- Ben Hayes – American pitcher (1982–1983), 1970 LLWS (Wiesbaden, Germany)
- Charlie Hayes – American third baseman (1988–2001), 1977 LLWS (Hattiesburg, Mississippi). 1996 MLB World Series champion
- Yonny Hernández, Venezuelan infielder (2021–2023), 2011 LLWS (Maracay, Venezuela)
- Grant Holman - American Pitcher (2024–present) 2013 LLWS (Chula Vista, California)
- Ken Hubbs – American second baseman (1961–1963), 1954 LLWS (Colton, California). 1962 National League (NL) Rookie of the Year
- Cooper Hummel – American catcher and outfielder (2022–present), 2007 LLWS (Lake Oswego, Oregon)
- Erik Johnson – American infielder (1993–1994), 1978 LLWS US champion, WS runner-up (San Ramon, California)
- Scott Kingery – American utility player (2018–present), 2006 LLWS (Phoenix, Arizona)
- Keith Lampard – American outfielder (1969–1970), 1958 LLWS (Portland, Oregon)
- Carney Lansford – American third baseman (1978–1992), 1969 LLWS (Santa Clara, California). 1989 MLB World Series champion
- Josh Lester – American utility player (2022–2023), 2006 LLWS champions (Columbus, Georgia)
- Adam Loewen – Canadian pitcher and outfielder (2006–2016), 1996 LLWS (Surrey, British Columbia)
- Vance Lovelace – American pitcher (1988–1990), 1975 LLWS (Tampa, Florida)
- Lance Lynn – American pitcher (2011–2024), 1999 LLWS (Brownsburg, Indiana)
- Jason Marquis – American pitcher (2000–2015), 1991 LLWS (Staten Island, New York) / 2005 NL Silver Slugger Award and 2006 MLB World Series champion
- Lloyd McClendon – American outfielder (1987–1994), manager (2001–2005, 2014–2015, 2020); 1971 LLWS runner-up (Gary, Indiana)
- Lastings Milledge – American outfielder (2006–2011), 1997 LLWS (Bradenton, Florida)
- Bobby Mitchell – American outfielder (1980–1983), 1967 LLWS (Northridge, California)
- Max Moroff – American infielder (2016–2021), 2005 LLWS (Maitland, Florida)
- Jim Pankovits – American infielder (1984–1990), 1968 LLWS runner-up (Richmond, Virginia)
- Francisco Peña – Dominican catcher (2014–2018), 2001 LLWS (Bronx, New York)
- Yusmeiro Petit – Venezuelan pitcher (2006–2021), 1994 LLWS champion (Maracaibo, Venezuela). 2014 MLB World Series champion with the San Francisco Giants. Only player to win a LLWS title and an MLB World Series title.
- Marc Pisciotta – American pitcher (1997–1999), 1983 LLWS (Marietta, Georgia)
- Boog Powell – American first baseman (1961–1977), 1954 LLWS (Lakeland, Florida). 1966 and 1970 MLB World Series champion, 1969 and 1971 MLB World Series runner-up
- Nick Pratto – American first baseman (2022–present), 2011 LLWS champion (Huntington Beach, California)
- Yohel Pozo – Venezuelan catcher (2021-present), 2009 LLWS (Maracaibo, Venezuela)
- Jurickson Profar – Curaçaoan outfielder (2012–present), 2004 LLWS champion, 2005 LLWS runner-up (Willemstad, Curaçao)
- Jeferson Quero – Venezuelan catcher (2026–present), 2015 LLWS (Barquisimeto, Venezuela)
- Guillermo Quiróz – Venezuelan catcher (2004–2014), 1994 LLWS champion (Maracaibo, Venezuela)
- Ceddanne Rafaela – Curaçaoan infielder and outfielder (2023–present), 2012 LLWS (Willemstad, Curaçao)
- Colby Rasmus – American outfielder (2009–2018), 1999 LLWS runner-up (Phenix City, Alabama)
- Cory Rasmus – American pitcher (2013–2016), 1999 LLWS runner-up (Phenix City, Alabama)
- Brady Rodgers – American pitcher (2016–2019), 2003 LLWS (Richmond, Texas)
- Emmanuel Rodriguez Dominican outfielder (2026–present), 2015 LLWS (Santiago de los Caballeros, Dominican Republic)
- Michael Saunders – Canadian outfielder (2009–2017), 1999 LLWS (Victoria, British Columbia)
- Jonathan Schoop – Curaçaoan second baseman (2013–2023), 2003 third place and 2004 LLWS champion (Willemstad, Curaçao)
- Gary Sheffield – American outfielder (1988–2009), 1980 LLWS runner-up (Tampa, Florida). 1997 MLB World Series champion, 5-Time Silver Slugger Award
- Andrew Stevenson – American outfielder (2017–2023), 2005 LLWS (Lafayette, Louisiana)
- Carl Taylor – American catcher and outfielder (1968–1973), 1954 LLWS (Lakeland, Florida)
- Rubén Tejada – Panamanian shortshop (2010–2019), 2001 LLWS (Santiago de Veraguas, Panama)
- Clete Thomas – American outfielder (2008–2013), 1996 LLWS (Panama City, Florida)
- Héctor Torres – Mexican shortshop (1968–1977), 1958 LLWS champion (Monterrey, Mexico)
- Devon Travis – American second baseman (2015–2018), 2003 LLWS runner-up (Boynton Beach, Florida)
- Bobby Treviño – Mexican outfielder (1968), 1958 LLWS champions (Monterrey, Mexico)
- George Tsamis – American pitcher (1993), 1979 LLWS runner-up (Campbell, California)
- Jason Varitek – American catcher (1997–2011), 1984 LLWS runner-up (Altamonte Springs, Florida). 2004 and 2007 MLB World Series champion with the Boston Red Sox
- Dave Veres – American pitcher (1994–2003), 1978 LLWS (Torrejón AFB, Spain)
- Ed Vosberg – American pitcher (1986–2002), 1973 LLWS runner-up (Tucson, Arizona). 1997 MLB World Series champion with the Florida Marlins. Won NCAA World Series title with University of Arizona
- Wei-Chung Wang – Taiwanese pitcher (2014, 2017, 2019), 2004 LLWS (Taitung City, Taiwan)
- Matt Wilkinson – Canadian pitcher (2026–present); 2015 LLWS (White Rock, British Columbia)
- Dan Wilson – American catcher (1992–2005), manager (2024–present), 1981 LLWS (Barrington, Illinois)
- Rick Wise – American pitcher (1964–1982), 1958 LLWS (Portland, Oregon). Played in 1975 MLB World Series with the Boston Red Sox

=== National Football League players ===
- Cortez Broughton – American defensive tackle (2019–2023), 2009 LLWS (Warner Robins, Georgia)
- Matt Cassel – American quarterback (2005–2018), 1994 LLWS runner-up (Northridge, California)
- Jake Fromm – American quarterback (2020–present), 2011 LLWS (Warner Robins, Georgia)
- Gale Gilbert – American quarterback (1985–1995), 1974 LLWS runner-up (Red Bluff, California). Played in 5 Super Bowls: XXV–XXVII with the Buffalo Bills and XXIX with the San Diego Chargers
- Dick Hart – American guard (1967–1970) – 1955 LLWS (Morrisville, Pennsylvania)
- Billy Hunter – American wide receiver (1965–1966), U.S. Prosecutor for Northern District of California, executive director of the National Basketball Players Association; 1955 LLWS runner-up (Delaware Township, New Jersey)
- Daryle Lamonica – American quarterback. played in first Little League World Series ever held
- Jack Losch – American halfback (1956), 1947 LLWS champion (Williamsport, Pennsylvania)
- Trey Quinn – American wide receiver (2018–2024), 2008 LLWS (Lake Charles, Louisiana)
- Turk Schonert – American quarterback (1980–1991), 1968 LLWS (Garden Grove, California). Played in Super Bowl XVI & XXIII with the Cincinnati Bengals
- Brian Sipe – American quarterback (1974–1985), 1961 LLWS (El Cajon, California). 1980 NFL MVP
- Julian Vandervelde – American center (2011–2015), 2000 LLWS (Davenport, Iowa)

=== National Hockey League players ===
- Chris Drury – American center (1998–2011), president and general manager for the New York Rangers (2021–present); 1989 LLWS champion (Trumbull, Connecticut). 2001 Stanley Cup champion, 1998 Hobey Baker Award winner, 1999 Calder Memorial Trophy winner
- Ray Ferraro – Canadian center (1984–2002), 1976 LLWS (Trail, British Columbia)
- Stéphane Matteau – Canadian winger (1988–2003), 1982 LLWS (Rouyn-Noranda, Quebec). 1994 Stanley Cup champion
- Yanic Perreault – Canadian center (1991–2008), 1983 LLWS (Sherbrooke, Quebec)
- Jayden Struble – American defenseman (2023–present), 2014 LLWS (Cumberland, Rhode Island)
- Pierre Turgeon – Canadian center (1987–2007), 1982 LLWS (Rouyn-Noranda, Quebec). 4-time NHL All-Star
- Harry Zolnierczyk – Canadian winger (2010–2019), 2000 LLWS (Toronto, Ontario)

=== Other ===
- Danny Almonte – Center of significant controversy following the 2001 series due to age falsification - 2001 LLWS (Bronx, New York)
- Mo'ne Davis – First girl to record a win as a pitcher and to pitch a shutout; first little league player to appear on the cover of Sports Illustrated at the time of tournament play, 2014 AP Female Athlete of the Year - 2014 LLWS (Philadelphia, Pennsylvania)
- Ron DeSantis – 46th Governor of Florida and former U.S. Representative from Florida's 6th district - 1991 LLWS (Dunedin, Florida)
- Austin Dillon – 2011 NASCAR Camping World Truck Series champion, 2013 NASCAR Nationwide Series champion - 2002 LLWS (Clemmons, North Carolina)
- Krissy Wendell – Former U.S. women's national hockey team player, Current amateur scout for the Pittsburgh Penguins - 1994 LLWS (Brooklyn Park, Minnesota)

== Media coverage ==
The first broadcast of the Little League World Series on television was on ABC Sports (now ESPN on ABC) in 1963. For years, only the championship game was televised. Since the late 1980s, when the tournament was reorganized, both the U.S. and international championships, the "semifinals", have been shown. As the years passed, more telecasts were added on ABC, ESPN, and ESPN2. In 2006, 28 of the 36 games were televised on the three networks. In addition, several regional tournament games, which are qualifiers for the LLWS, are televised on ESPN during the days leading up to the LLWS.

The 2006 world championship game was to be the last telecast on ABC Sports before ESPN's complete takeover of the sports division and name change. However, the final was postponed one day because of rain and was shown by ESPN2.

In January 2007, it was announced that ESPN, ESPN2, and ABC had extended their contract with the Little League organization through 2014. That year, every game of the LLWS was scheduled to be televised for the first time, with all but one game live on ESPN, ESPN2, or ABC. (The other game was to be available online at ESPN360, then shown on ESPN2 the next day.) In addition, a number of games were to be shown in high-definition on ESPN, ESPN2, and ABC. The championship games in all other divisions, as well as the semifinals and finals of the Little League Softball World Series, was scheduled for either ESPN, ESPN2 or ESPNU.

In June 2011, it was announced that ESPN would add 17 games to its schedule on ESPN 3D.

Coverage of the qualifying games has increased substantially in the US within the past decade: as of 2018, all regional group games (with the exception of the Southwest region) are available via subscription online through the ESPN+ platform, with the last three games of each regional tournament on an ESPN network. The aforementioned Southwest regional games are aired in full on the Longhorn Network (itself owned by ESPN). The increased level of participation, competition, and publicity of the Little League World Series in recent years has established a trend in the opposite direction of many other preteen sports.

Most LLWS games are broadcast live on local radio station WRAK 1400AM, which is owned by iHeartMedia.

== Other divisions in Little League Baseball ==
After discontinuing their big league divisions in 2017 due to low participation levels over the previous 15 years, seven of the remaining eleven divisions of Little League Baseball has its own World Series format (including three in girls' softball).

Division	Location	Years active	Age of players	Series
Little League Baseball	South Williamsport, Pennsylvania	1947–present	11–12 years old	Little League World Series
Little League Intermediate Division	Livermore, California	2013–present	11–13 years old	Intermediate Little League World Series
Junior League Baseball	Taylor, Michigan	1981–present	13–14 years old	Junior League World Series
Senior League Baseball	Easley, South Carolina	1961–present	14–16 years old	Senior League World Series
Big League Baseball	Easley, South Carolina	1968–2016	16–18 years old	Big League World Series
Little League Softball	Greenville, North Carolina	1974–present	11–12 years old	Little League World Series (softball)
Junior League Softball	Kirkland, Washington	1999–present	12–14 years old	Junior League World Series (softball)
Senior League Softball	Sussex County, Delaware	1976–present	13–16 years old	Senior League World Series (softball)
Big League Softball	Sussex County, Delaware	1982–2016	14–18 years old	Big League World Series (softball)

== See also ==
- List of Little League World Series champions by division
- Little League World Series on television
- The Little League World Series Baseball video game series published by Activision
- Mexico in the Little League World Series
- Amateur baseball in the United States
- U-12 Baseball World Cup, the most elite and highest level of U-12 baseball competition, sanctioned by the World Baseball Softball Confederation (WBSC) and held every 2 years.
- List of organized baseball leagues
- Baseball awards § World (world, international-bracket, and regional champions)
- Baseball awards § U.S. youth baseball (national, regional, and state champions)
