= Little League World Series in Mexico =

Youth baseball competition in Mexico

Mexican Little League Championship
- Most recent season or competition: 2026 Little League World Series qualification
- Formerly: Latin America Region
- Sport: Baseball
- Founded: 2001; 25 years ago
- Country: Mexico
- Most recent champions: Municipal de Tijuana Little League, Tijuana, Baja California
- Most titles: (Tamaulipas) Matamoros Little League, Matamoros (7)

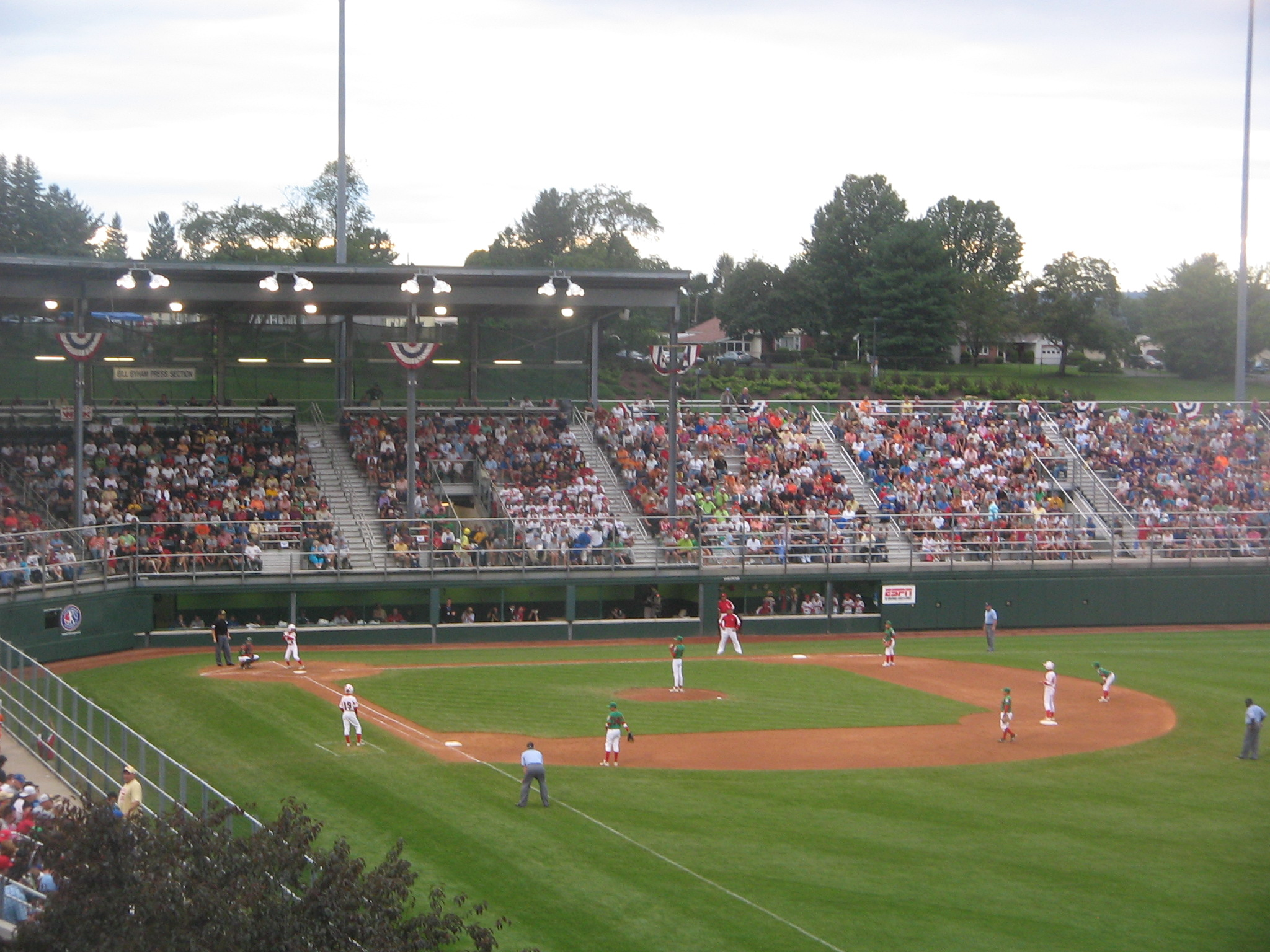
A team from Mexico (fielding) playing a team from Japan (batting) during the 2010 Little League World Series

Qualification for the Little League World Series in Mexico, whereby teams based in Mexico compete to select a champion to participate in the Little League World Series (LLWS), has occurred since 2001. In 2001, when the LLWS expanded to 16 teams, the Mexico Region was created as one of eight international regions, resulting in Mexico's Little League champion receiving an automatic berth in the LLWS. Mexico previously competed as part of the Latin America Region, from 1958 to 2001, whereby the champion from Mexico had to compete against teams from other countries in order to secure a berth in the LLWS.

Mexican teams have won three LLWS championships (1957, 1958, 1997) and have been runner-up three times (1964, 1985, 2008). The country currently has about 450 active leagues, making it the third-largest country in terms of Little League participation.

== Mexican championships ==
=== Finals ===
Since 2001, when the Mexico Region was created.

Year	Host	Winner	Result	Runner up
2001	(Nuevo León) Monterrey	(Tamaulipas) Matamoros (Matamoros)	3–0	(Chihuahua (state)) Villahermosa (Ciudad Juárez)
2002	(Nuevo León) Monterrey	(Nuevo León) Country (Monterrey)	6–3	(Tamaulipas) Niños Heroes (Reynosa)
2003	(Sonora) Hermosillo	Olmeca (Mexico City)	3–2	(Sonora) Guaymas Sector Pesca (Guaymas)
2004	(Nuevo León) Monterrey	(Nuevo León) Linda Vista (Guadalupe)	4–0	(Nuevo León) La Mala Torres (Guadalupe)
2005	(Tamaulipas) Reynosa	(Baja California) Seguro Social (Mexicali)	5–2	Olmeca (Mexico City)
2006	(Nuevo León) Monterrey	(Tamaulipas) Matamoros (Matamoros)	10–0	(Nuevo León) Santa Catarina (Santa Catarina)
2007	Mexico City	(Baja California) Seguro Social (Mexicali)	11–0	(Veracruz) Beto Ávila (Boca del Río)
2008	(Nuevo León) Monterrey	(Tamaulipas) Matamoros (Matamoros)	5–1	(Sonora) Guaymas Sector Pesca (Guaymas)
2009	(Tamaulipas) Reynosa	(Tamaulipas) Guadalupe Treviño Kelly (Reynosa)	12–0	Maya (Mexico City)
2010	(Nuevo León) Monterrey	(Tamaulipas) Oriente (Nuevo Laredo)	3–1	(Chihuahua (state)) Satellite (Ciudad Juárez)
2011	(Baja California) Mexicali	(Baja California) Seguro Social (Mexicali)	4–1	(Nuevo León) Mitras (Monterrey)
2012	(Nuevo León) Monterrey	(Tamaulipas) Oriente (Nuevo Laredo)	10–7	(Nuevo León) Santa Catarina (Santa Catarina)
2013	(Tamaulipas) Reynosa	(Baja California) Municipal De Tijuana (Tijuana)	11–5	(Veracruz) Beto Ávila (Boca del Rio)
2014	(Nuevo León) Monterrey	(Nuevo León) Linda Vista (Guadalupe)	12–6	(Baja California) Félix Arce (Mexicali)
2015	(Tamaulipas) Matamoros	(Baja California) Seguro Social (Mexicali)	13–7	(Sonora) Conno de Hermosillo (Hermosillo)
2016	(Nuevo León) Monterrey	(Nuevo León) San Nicolas (San Nicolas de los Garza)	6–5	(Sonora) Norte de Hermosillo (Hermosillo)
2017	(Coahuila) Sabinas	(Tamaulipas) Guadalupe Treviño Kelly (Reynosa)	3–1	(Tamaulipas) Matamoros (Matamoros)
2018	(Nuevo León) Monterrey	(Tamaulipas) Matamoros (Matamoros)	5–3	(Tamaulipas) Guadalupe Treviño Kelly (Reynosa)
2019	(Coahuila) Sabinas	(Nuevo León) Mala Torres (Guadalupe)	3–1	(Tamaulipas) Matamoros (Matamoros)
2022	(Tamaulipas) Matamoros	(Tamaulipas) Matamoros (Matamoros)	3–2	(Baja California) Municipal de Tijuana (Tijuana)
2023	(Nuevo León) Monterrey	(Baja California) Municipal de Tijuana (Tijuana)	4–0	(Tamaulipas) Villa del Refugio (Matamoros)
2024	(Nuevo León) Monterrey	(Tamaulipas) Matamoros (Matamoros)	5–4	(Chihuahua (state)) Swing Perfecto de Chihuahua (Chihuahua)
2025	(Sonora) Guaymas	(Chihuahua (state)) El Swing Perfecto (Chihuahua)	4–1	(Tamaulipas) Matamoros (Matamoros)
2026	(Tamaulipas) Matamoros	(Baja California) Municipal de Tijuana (Tijuana)	8–2	(Tamaulipas) Matamoros (Matamoros)

=== Regions ===
Little League baseball in Mexico is divided into seven regions which each send two teams to the Mexico qualifying tournament for the LLWS. These regions are:

- Region 1: Nuevo León
- Region 2: Tamaulipas
- Region 3: Coahuila, Durango, San Luis Potosi, & Zacatecas
- Region 4: Baja California, Baja California Sur, Sinaloa & Sonora
- Region 5: Chihuahua
- Region 6: Every part of Mexico south and east of Jalisco, Guanajuato, San Luis Potosi, & Tamaulipas
- Region 7: Aguascalientes, Guanajuato, Jalisco, Nayarit

== Mexico in the Little League World Series ==
The table below lists the records of teams from Mexico that have competed in the LLWS in South Williamsport, Pennsylvania. Participation before 2001 was inconsistent (for example, only one appearance during the 1970s), as teams from Mexico had to qualify via the Latin America Region. Since 2001, Mexico receives an automatic berth in the LLWS, with the exception of 2020 (when no LLWS was held) and 2021 (when the LLWS was restricted to teams based in the United States) due to the COVID-19 pandemic. Notably, teams from Mexico have twice represented regions of the United States in the LLWS:

- In 1957, Industrial Little League of Monterrey represented the South Region of the United States. The team defeated Biloxi LL, 13–0, and Owensboro LL, 3–0, in the regional final. Monterrey then defeated teams from Connecticut and California to win the LLWS.
- In 1985, Mexicali Little League of Mexicali represented the West Region of the United States. Because of its proximity to the El Centro/Calexico area in Southern California (the potential players from that region could have played for that city's leagues), Mexicali competed in and represented California's District 22 in the Southern California division and won the West Region tournament. They defeated Green Valley LL, 10–0, Fairbanks LL, 8–0, Raleigh Hills LL, 10–0, and finally Danville LL, 2–0, in the regional final. Mexicali went on to become the United States champion, and was LLWS runner-up to the international champion (National Little League, Kaohsiung, Taiwan). After the 1985 Series, Mexicali Little League was shifted from California leagues to Mexico leagues.

Year	League	City	Region	Result	Record
1957	Industrial	(Nuevo León) Monterrey	(United States) South	Champions	2–0
1958	Industrial	(Nuevo León) Monterrey	Latin America	Champions	3–0
1960	Industrial	(Nuevo León) Monterrey	Latin America	4th place	1–2
1961	Industrial	(Nuevo León) Monterrey	Latin America	3rd place	2–1
1962	Del Norte	(Nuevo León) Monterrey	Latin America	4th place	1–2
1963	Obispado	(Nuevo León) Monterrey	Latin America	5th place	1–2
1964	Obispado	(Nuevo León) Monterrey	Latin America	Runner-up	2–1
1966	Cuauhtemoc	(Nuevo León) Monterrey	Latin America	6th place	1–2
1967	Linares	(Nuevo León) Linares	Latin America	4th place	1–2
1973	Mitras	(Nuevo León) Monterrey	Latin America	6th place	1–2
1981	Unidad Modelo	(Nuevo León) Monterrey	Latin America	7th place	1–2
1985	Mexicali	(Baja California) Mexicali	(United States) West	Runner-up	2–1
1990	Matamoros	(Tamaulipas) Matamoros	Latin America	5th place	1–1
1997	Linda Vista	(Nuevo León) Guadalupe	Latin America	Champions	5–0
1998	Linda Vista	(Nuevo León) Guadalupe	Latin America	Group Stage	0–3
2001	Matamoros	(Tamaulipas) Matamoros	Mexico	Quarterfinals	2–2
2002	Contry de Monterrey	(Nuevo León) Monterrey	Mexico	Group Stage	1–2
2003	Olmeca	Mexico City	Mexico	Quarterfinals	2–2
2004	Linda Vista	(Nuevo León) Guadalupe	Mexico	4th place	3–3
2005	Seguro Social	(Baja California) Mexicali	Mexico	Group Stage	1–2
2006	Matamoros	(Tamaulipas) Matamoros	Mexico	3rd place	3–2
2007	Seguro Social	(Baja California) Mexicali	Mexico	Group Stage	1–2
2008	Matamoros	(Tamaulipas) Matamoros	Mexico	Runner-up	5–1
2009	Guadalupe Treviño Kelly	(Tamaulipas) Reynosa	Mexico	3rd place	5–1
2010	Oriente	(Tamaulipas) Nuevo Laredo	Mexico	Group Stage	2–2
2011	Seguro Social	(Baja California) Mexicali	Mexico	3rd place	3–1
2012	Oriente	(Tamaulipas) Nuevo Laredo	Mexico	Int'l Semifinal	3–2
2013	Municipal De Tijuana	(Baja California) Tijuana	Mexico	3rd place	4–2
2014	Linda Vista	(Nuevo León) Guadalupe	Mexico	Int'l Semifinal	3–2
2015	Seguro Social	(Baja California) Mexicali	Mexico	4th place	4–3
2016	San Nicolás	(Nuevo León) San Nicolás de los Garza	Mexico	Int'l Semifinal	3–2
2017	Guadalupe Treviño Kelly	(Tamaulipas) Reynosa	Mexico	3rd place	5–2
2018	Matamoros	(Tamaulipas) Matamoros	Mexico	Round 2	1–2
2019	Epitacio Mala Torres	(Nuevo León) Guadalupe	Mexico	Round 2	1–2
2020	Cancelled due to COVID-19 pandemic				
2021	No international participant				
2022	Matamoros	(Tamaulipas) Matamoros	Mexico	Int'l Semifinal	2–2
2023	Municipal de Tijuana	(Baja California) Tijuana	Mexico	Int'l Semifinal	3–2
2024	Matamoros	(Tamaulipas) Matamoros	Mexico	Round 4	3–2
2025	El Swing Perfecto	(Chihuahua (state)) Chihuahua	Mexico	Round 3	2–2
2026	Municipal de Tijuana	(Baja California) Tijuana	Mexico	Round 3	1–2

== Summary ==
As of the 2026 Little League World Series.

State	WS	1st	2nd	3rd	4th	Wins	Loss	PCT
Nuevo León	18	3	1	1	4	32	30	.516
Tamaulipas	11	0	1	3	0	32	19	.627
Baja California	8	0	1	2	1	19	15	.559
(Mexico City) Distrito Federal	1	0	0	0	0	2	2	.500
(Chihuahua (state)) Chihuahua	1	0	0	0	0	2	2	.500
Total	39	3	3	6	5	87	68	.561

== Notable players ==
- David Cortés – later played in Major League Baseball (MLB) with Atlanta, Cleveland, and Colorado. (1985 LLWS)
- Héctor Torres – son of Epitacio "La Mala" Torres, and MLB player between 1968 and 1977. (1958 LLWS)
- Carlos "Bobby" Treviño – played in MLB during 1968 with the California Angels, and played 13 season in the Mexican League. (1958 LLWS)

== World champions ==
=== 1957 Liga Pequeña Industrial ===
Roster

- Angel Macías
- Enrique Suárez
- Norberto Villarreal
- Ricardo Treviño
- Baltasar Charles
- Rafael Estrello
- Gerardo González
- José Maiz García
- Jesús Contreras
- Mario Ontiveros
- Alfonso Cortez
- Roberto Mendiola
- Fidel Ruiz
- Francisco Aguilar

Manager

- Cesar L. Faz

Coaches

- Harold Haskings
- José González Torres

=== 1997 Liga Pequeña Linda Vista ===
Roster

- Rafael Hinojosa Coronado
- Everardo Ordoñez Garza
- Javier de Isla Villarreal
- Adrian Luna Soto
- Juan de Dios Garza Zambrano
- Ricardo García Alejandro
- Alejandro Robles Treviño
- Pablo Torres Reyes
- René Hinojosa Garza
- Alejandro Guajardo Peña
- Omar Rios Pérez
- Luis Robles Obregón
- Daniel Baca Marcos
- Gabriel Alvarez Sevilla

Manager

- Jaime Luna Gómez

Coaches

- José Angel Valadez Guerrero
- Julio Garza de la Garza

== See also ==
- Little League World Series in Latin America
- Little League World Series (Caribbean Region)

Latin America Region in other Little League divisions

- Intermediate League
- Junior League
- Senior League
- Big League
