= 2006 Little League World Series =

Children's baseball tournament

Tournament details
- Dates: August 18–August 28
- Teams: 16

Final positions
- Champions: Northern Little League (United States) (Georgia (U.S. state)) Columbus, Georgia
- Runners-up: Kawaguchi City Little League; Kawaguchi, Saitama, Japan

The 2006 Little League World Series, held in South Williamsport, Pennsylvania, took place between August 18 and August 28, one day later than originally scheduled. Inclement weather forced the cancellation of the third-place game on August 27 and the postponement of the championship game also scheduled for that date. The Northern Little League of Columbus, Georgia, defeated Kawaguchi City Little League of Kawaguchi, Japan, in the championship game of the 60th Little League World Series.

The event was broadcast in the United States on ABC Sports, ESPN and ESPN2 in both analog and high-definition. The U.S. Championship game was the last ABC Sports telecast. Games were held in the two stadiums located at Little League headquarters in South Williamsport:

- Howard J. Lamade Stadium — the main stadium, opened in 1959, with seating for 10,000 in the stands and hillside terrace seating for up to 30,000 more
- Little League Volunteer Stadium — a newer facility, opened in 2001, that seats slightly over 5,000, primarily in the stands

== Teams ==
Between five and twelve teams take part in 16 regional qualification tournaments, which vary in format depending on region. In the United States, the qualification tournaments are in the same format as the Little League World Series itself: a round-robin tournament followed by an elimination round to determine the regional champion.

Pool A	Pool B	Pool C	Pool D
(New York (state)) Staten Island, New York; Mid-Atlantic Region; Mid-Island Little League	(New Hampshire) Portsmouth, New Hampshire; New England Region; Portsmouth Little League	(Northern Mariana Islands) Saipan, Northern Mariana Islands; Pacific Region; Saipan Little League	Matamoros, Tamaulipas; Mexico Region; Matamoros Little League
(Illinois) Lemont, Illinois; Great Lakes Region; Lemont Little League	(Oregon) Beaverton, Oregon; Northwest Region; Murrayhill Little League	(Venezuela) Barquisimeto, Venezuela; Latin America Region; Cardenales Little League	(Japan) (Saitama Prefecture) Kawaguchi, Saitama, Japan; Asia Region; Kawaguchi City Little League
(Arizona) Phoenix, Arizona; West Region; Ahwatukee American Little League	(Missouri) Columbia, Missouri; Midwest Region; Daniel Boone National Little League	Surrey, British Columbia; Canada Region; Whalley Little League	(Russia) Moscow, Russia; Europe, Middle East and Africa (EMEA) Region; Brateevo Little League
(Georgia (U.S. state)) Columbus, Georgia; Southeast Region; Northern Little League	(Louisiana) Lake Charles, Louisiana; Southwest Region; South Lake Charles Little League	(Saudi Arabia) Dhahran, Saudi Arabia; Transatlantic Region; Arabian-American Little League	(Curaçao) Willemstad, Curaçao; Caribbean Region; Pabao Little League

== Results ==
=== Pool play ===
The top two teams in each pool moved on to their respective semifinals. The winners of each met on August 27 to play for the Little League World Championship. Teams marked in green qualified to the knockout stage. Ties are broken based on records in head-to-head competition among tied teams. If a clear winner cannot be determined from head-to-head results, the tie is broken by calculating the ratio of runs allowed to defensive innings played for all teams involved in the tie. The team with the lowest runs-per-defensive-inning ratio advances.

==== United States ====
Pool A
Rank	Region	Record	Runs Allowed	Run Ratio
1	(Illinois) Great Lakes	2–1	1	0.056
2	(Georgia (U.S. state)) Southeast	2–1	5	0.263
3	(Arizona) West	2–1	5	0.278
4	(New York (state)) Mid-Atlantic	0–3	8	0.421

- Great Lakes wins pool based on defensive run ratio. Southeast is the runner-up based on win against West.

Pool B
Rank	Region	Record	Runs Allowed	Run Ratio
1	(New Hampshire) New England	2–1	15	0.833
2	(Oregon) Northwest	2–1	8	0.444
3	(Missouri) Midwest	1–2	6	0.381
4	(Louisiana) Southwest	1–2	14	0.737

- New England wins Pool B based on head-to-head tiebreaker.

All times US EDT

Pool	Away	Score	Home	Score	Time (Venue)
August 18
B	(New Hampshire) New England	6	(Oregon) Northwest	1	4:00 pm (Lamade Stadium)
B	(Louisiana) Southwest	1 (F/9)	(Missouri) Midwest	0	8:00 pm (Lamade Stadium)
August 19
A	(New York (state)) Mid-Atlantic	2	(Georgia (U.S. state)) Southeast	3 (F/7)	1:00 pm (Lamade Stadium)
A	(Arizona) West	1	(Illinois) Great Lakes	0	3:00 pm (Volunteer Stadium)
August 20
B	(New Hampshire) New England	5	(Missouri) Midwest	14	Noon (Volunteer Stadium)
A	(Georgia (U.S. state)) Southeast	4	(Arizona) West	1	1:00 pm (Lamade Stadium)
B	(Louisiana) Southwest	1	(Oregon) Northwest	9	3:00 pm (Volunteer Stadium)
A	(New York (state)) Mid-Atlantic	0	(Illinois) Great Lakes	1	8:00 pm (Lamade Stadium)
August 21
B	(Louisiana) Southwest	0	(New Hampshire) New England	5	3:00 pm (Lamade Stadium)
B	(Oregon) Northwest	2	(Missouri) Midwest	1	8:00 pm (Lamade Stadium)
August 22
A	(Arizona) West	4	(New York (state)) Mid-Atlantic	1	3:00 pm (Lamade Stadium)
A	(Georgia (U.S. state)) Southeast	0	(Illinois) Great Lakes	2	8:00 pm (Lamade Stadium)

- The New England vs. Midwest game was postponed due to a rain delay and was played on August 20.

==== International ====
Pool C
Rank	Region	Record	Runs Allowed	Run Ratio
1	(Venezuela) Latin America	3–0	2	0.136
2	(Saudi Arabia) Transatlantic	2–1	2	0.100
3	Canada	1–2	9	0.500
4	(Northern Mariana Islands) Pacific	0–3	12	0.600

Pool D
Rank	Region	Record	Runs Allowed	Run Ratio
1	(Japan) Asia	3–0	3	0.176
2	Mexico	2–1	9	0.529
3	(Curaçao) Caribbean	1–2	10	0.556
4	(Russia) EMEA	0–3	30	1.875

All times US EDT

Pool	Away	Score	Home	Score	Time (Venue)
August 18
C	(Saudi Arabia) Transatlantic	5	Canada	0	6:00 pm (Volunteer Stadium)
August 19
D	(Russia) EMEA	0	(Japan) Asia*	11 (F/5)	11:00 am (Lamade Stadium)
D	(Curaçao) Caribbean	2	Mexico	3	4:00 pm (Lamade Stadium)
C	(Northern Mariana Islands) Pacific	0	(Venezuela) Latin America	1 (F/8)	6:00 pm (Volunteer Stadium)
August 20
C	(Northern Mariana Islands) Pacific	1	(Saudi Arabia) Transatlantic	9	5:00 pm (Lamade Stadium)
D	(Russia) EMEA	1	Mexico	11 (F/5)	7:00 pm (Volunteer Stadium)
August 21
D	(Russia) EMEA	0	(Curaçao) Caribbean	8	11:00 am (Lamade Stadium)
D	(Japan) Asia	6	Mexico	1	1:00 pm (Volunteer Stadium)
C	Canada	2	(Venezuela) Latin America	3	6:00 pm (Volunteer Stadium)
August 22
D	(Japan) Asia	7	(Curaçao) Caribbean	2	11:00 am (Lamade Stadium)
C	Canada	2	(Northern Mariana Islands) Pacific	1	1:00 pm (Volunteer Stadium)
C	(Saudi Arabia) Transatlantic	0	(Venezuela) Latin America	1 (F/8)	6:00 pm (Volunteer Stadium)

- Asterisk (*) denotes no-hitter thrown
- The Pacific vs. Latin America game was suspended in the 8th inning due to a rain delay and was completed on August 21.

=== Elimination round ===
Quarter-finals
August 24 – 3:00 pm - Lamade
(Saudi Arabia) Transatlantic	1
(Japan) Asia	4
August 23 – 3:00 pm - Lamade (F/4)
(Venezuela) Latin America	0
Mexico	11
August 24 – 7:30 pm - Lamade
(Georgia (U.S. state)) Southeast	8
(New Hampshire) New England	0
August 23 – 7:30 pm - Lamade
(Illinois) Great Lakes	3
(Oregon) Northwest	4

Semi-finals
August 26 – 7:30 pm - Lamade
(Japan) Asia	3
Mexico	0
August 27 – 3:30 pm - Lamade
(Georgia (U.S. state)) Southeast	7
(Oregon) Northwest	3

Final
August 28 – 5:00 pm - Lamade
(Japan) Asia	1
(United States) (Georgia (U.S. state)) Southeast	2

The consolation game between Matamoros, Mexico and Beaverton, Oregon, scheduled for August 27 at Volunteer Stadium, was cancelled due to rain, and both teams share third place. The championship game was originally scheduled for 3:30 pm US EDT on August 27, but was postponed due to rain. The game was originally rescheduled for 8:00 pm on August 28, but changed because of weather concerns.

2006 Little League World Series Champions
Northern Little League
Columbus, Georgia

== Notable players ==
- Gavin Cecchini (Southwest) - New York Mets
- Jace Fry (Northwest) - Chicago White Sox
- Scott Kingery (West) - Philadelphia Phillies
- Josh Lester (Southeast) - Detroit Tigers

== Champion's path ==
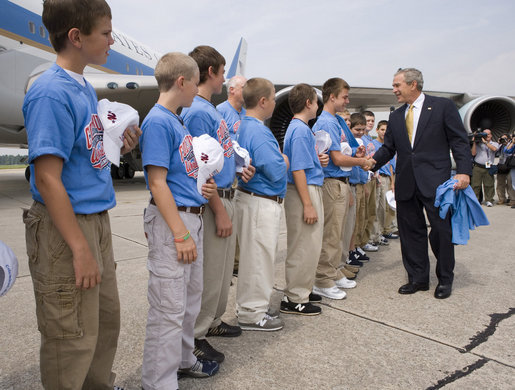
President George W. Bush meeting the Columbus Northern team

Round	Opposition	Result
Georgia State Tournament
Group Stage	(Georgia (U.S. state)) Cartersville LL	9–0
Group Stage	(Georgia (U.S. state)) Decatur Belvedere LL	15–0
Group Stage	(Georgia (U.S. state)) Toccoa American LL	12–2
Group Stage	(Georgia (U.S. state)) Masters City LL	17–2
Semifinals	(Georgia (U.S. state)) Masters City LL	15–5
Championship	(Georgia (U.S. state)) Buckhead	4–0
Southeast Regional
Group Stage	(West Virginia) Bridgeport American LL	16–0 (4 inn.)
Group Stage	(Tennessee) Columbia American LL	8–0
Group Stage	(Florida) Greater Dunedin LL	10–6
Semifinals	(Alabama) Cottage Hill LL	11–0 (4 inn.)
Southeast Region Championship	(Florida) Greater Dunedin LL	5–0

== Mid-Island incident ==
Television coverage aired throughout the United States on ABC Sports and ESPN. At first, there was no delay on its broadcasts, despite the fact that all managers and coaches were equipped with miniature microphones. That changed after two incidents; one in a preliminary game where an unidentified California pitcher told his coach that "[the umpire] ain't giving me shit" in reference to a tight strike zone, but the other, more important incident took place late in a preliminary-round game in which a player for Mid-Island Little League of Staten Island, New York, who was not publicly identified, told his teammates to just score "one fucking run" that was broadcast live on ESPN. In response, the team's manager, Nick Doscher, slapped the player, a violation of a Little League policy against physical contact targeting players. Both the player and manager were reprimanded, and ESPN and ABC imposed a five-second delay on future telecasts.

== See also ==
- Little League
- Little League World Series
