= Little League World Series on television =

Children's baseball tournament on TV

The Little League World Series is broadcast on television by ABC and ESPN, along with their family of networks. They also televise the regional championships, which precede the Little League World Series.

== Broadcast history ==
The ABC television network began televising a tape-delayed Little League World Series Championship Game on an annual basis in 1963. From 1965 to 1985, the championship game was broadcast during the weekend, airing under ABC's Wide World of Sports umbrella.

In 1982, Entertainment and Sports Programming Network (ESPN) began expanding their cable television network through increased coverage of sports entertainment on a global scale. During this time, ESPN's brand and its family of networks, began covering the Little League World Series games in a greater capacity. A total of 12 games were televised by the network in 2000, resulting in nationwide popularity of the game, which provided opportunities to expand the total number of teams from eight to 16.

In 2001, ESPN covered all eight U.S. regional championships. This was as a result of a second stadium, Volunteer Stadium, which allowed games to take place simultaneously. Also that year, ABC began televising the U.S. Championship Game. That year, ESPN aired a total of 25 games. In 2003, ABC, ESPN, and ESPN2 carried a total of 35 games including regional championships. All games aired on any ESPN network are also available via Internet streaming on ESPN3.

One of the most prominent announcers was Harold Reynolds. Former major league baseball player and color commentator Tony Gwynn referred to him as "the Pied Piper of Little League baseball." Some of the game broadcasters and play-by-play commentators have included sportscasters Al Michaels and Brent Musburger, American sports journalist Jim McKay, and former major league baseball players Cy Young Award and World Series MVP Orel Hershiser, and Hall of Fame baseball players Johnny Bench, Mickey Mantle and Jim Palmer. The 2026 announcers will be Joe Buck, Todd Frazier, David Ross with Jeff Passan and Kris Budden.

== Programming successes ==
The Poynter Institute was hired by ESPN to write about their programming, from an outsider's perspective. This blog became known as The Poynter Review Project. The report concludes that the Little League World Series is a good thing for ESPN, fans, and the players.

The Poynter Review Project stated that there was no reason for ESPN to shy away from the fact that the kids were crying. The project maintained that crying is actually a healthy emotion, and one that boys at this age should feel comfortable expressing. Adults should use those opportunities to reinforce that these emotions are normal and healthy responses to such a moment of either disappointment or achievement. Furthermore, the project asserted that not crying during such moments is actually an unhealthy response. The project also found no evidence that these boys develop mental health issues later on in life as a result of playing in this tournament, maintaining a variety of reasons to enjoy watching these young athletes compete at the highest level.

ESPN has now gone away from trying to show kids crying due to the previous criticism they received from viewers.

== Programming concerns ==
While there has been documented successes of the Little Leagues World Series, there have also been detractors of the sports program that believe that there is too much exposure for the Little League World Series, especially the effect it has on the participants. ESPN's Tim Scanlon defended the network's coverage, "We're not trying to hide or patronize the coverage... but you don't want to sensationalize those moments. It's about the experience and the competition. It's pure. It's almost innocent."

Exploitation of children

Bill Plaschke is a Los Angeles Times sports writer who also contributes to ESPN from time to time. He has written an article about the exploitation witnessed during a televised game of the Little League World Series. He describes in detail situations, such as children pouting in an attempt to hold themselves together in tough situations, parents yelling at the players, all which is aired in what can be perceived as an exploitation of their situations, for which there are many examples of in television. Plaschke says the blame is not on the networks, but on the Little League itself because if ESPN or ABC did not show the games then some other network would. Plaschke also said we just don't need to see it, and they don't need us to see it. Cameras do not help already tense situations, arbitrarily deter from what matters, and unjustly exploit. The cameras change everything for kids who just aren't ready for it. He brings up the point that no other league exploits their kids at such an early age. Most of these kids are between the age of 11–12. The earliest you see football and basketball stars are High school, and you cannot see hockey stars till college. A lot of this may have to do with popularity, and money, but that is why Plaschke blames the League the most for this.

The pressures of these kids often mirror those of a major league baseball team on any given day. Most days kids are playing in front of crowds of 45,000 people who are hanging onto their every pitch. Many of the star pitchers are throwing about 200 pitches on short rest, a practice not seen within Major League Baseball.

The pressure is not limited to the fans at the park. According to Biz of Baseball the 2009 had 1.56 million viewers. This was a 60% increase from the year before.

== See also ==
- Major League Baseball on ABC
- ESPN Major League Baseball
