= 1954 Little League World Series =

Children's baseball tournament

Tournament details
- Dates: August 24–August 27
- Teams: 8

Final positions
- Champions: (New York (state)) Schenectady, New York
- Runners-up: Colton, California

The 1954 Little League World Series was held from August 24 to August 27 in Williamsport, Pennsylvania. The Schenectady Little League of Schenectady, New York, defeated the Colton Little League of Colton, California, in the championship game of the eighth Little League World Series.

== Teams ==
States represented at the 1954 Little League World Series

| Region 1 | Needham, Massachusetts |
| Region 2 | (New York (state)) Schenectady, New York |
| Region 3 | Masontown, Pennsylvania |
| Region 4 | Hampton, Virginia |
| Region 5 | Lakeland, Florida |
| Region 6 | Melrose Park, Illinois |
| Region 7 | Galveston, Texas |
| Region 8 | Colton, California |

== Championship bracket ==
Quarter-finals
August 24
California | 4
Virginia | 2
August 24
Illinois | 6
Texas | 5
August 24
(New York (state)) New York | 16
Florida | 0
August 24
Pennsylvania | 10
Massachusetts | 2

Semi-finals
August 25
California | 8
Illinois | 1
August 25
(New York (state)) New York | 7
Pennsylvania | 3

Final
August 27
(New York (state)) New York | 7
California | 5
Third place
August 27
Illinois | 2
Pennsylvania | 3

== Notable players ==
- Jim Barbieri of Schenectady, New York, and Boog Powell of Lakeland, Florida, went on to become the first players to appear in both the Little League World Series and a Major League Baseball (MLB) World Series. After both played in the 1954 LLWS, they both played in the 1966 World Series; Barbieri for the Los Angeles Dodgers and Powell for the victorious Baltimore Orioles.
- Billy Connors of Schenectady later became an MLB pitcher and pitching coach.
- Ken Hubbs from Colton, California, became a second baseman for the Chicago Cubs, and won a Gold Glove and was the National League Rookie of the Year in 1962. He died in a plane crash near Provo, Utah, before the 1964 season.
- Carl Taylor of Lakeland, stepbrother of Boog Powell, went on to be an MLB catcher and outfielder.
