= 2004 Little League World Series =

Children's baseball tournament

Tournament details
- Dates: August 20–August 29
- Teams: 16

Final positions
- Champions: Pabao Little League; Willemstad, Curaçao
- Runners-up: Conejo Valley Little League (United States) Thousand Oaks, California

The 2004 Little League World Series took place between August 20 and August 29 in South Williamsport, Pennsylvania. The Pabao Little League of Willemstad, Curaçao, defeated Conejo Valley Little League of Thousand Oaks, California, in the championship game of the 58th Little League World Series. This was the first title for the Caribbean island of Curaçao.

== Qualification ==
Pool A	Pool B	Pool C	Pool D
(California) Thousand Oaks; West; Conejo Valley	(Texas) Richmond; Southwest; Lamar National	Panama City, Panama; Latin America; Curundu	(Curaçao) Willemstad, Curaçao; Caribbean; Pabao
(North Carolina) Morganton; Southeast; Morganton	(Maryland) Preston; Mid-Atlantic; South Carolina	(Taiwan) Kaohsiung, Chinese Taipei; Asia; Shou-Tien	(Mexico) Guadalupe, Nuevo León, Mexico; Mexico; Guadalupe Linda Vista
(Rhode Island) Lincoln; New England; Lincoln	(Washington (state)) Redmond; Northwest; Redmond North	(Canada) Ottawa, Canada; Canada; East Nepean	(Saudi Arabia) Dhahran, Saudi Arabia; Transatlantic; Arabian-American
(Iowa) Davenport; Midwest; Northwest	(Kentucky) Owensboro; Great Lakes; Southern	(Poland) Kutno, Poland; Europe, Middle East and Africa (EMEA); Kutno	(Northern Mariana Islands) Saipan, Northern Mariana Islands; Pacific; Saipan

- Taiwan participates under the name Chinese Taipei in many sporting events, including Little League Baseball (LLB).
- Northern Mariana Islands is an unincorporated territory and commonwealth of the United States.

== Pool play ==
The top two teams in each pool move on to their respective semifinals. The winners of each will meet August 29 to play for the Little League world championship.

Pool A
Region	Record
West	3-0
Southeast	2-1
New England	1-2
Midwest	0-3

Pool B
Region	Record
Southwest	3-0
Mid-Atlantic	1-2
Northwest	1-2
Great Lakes	1-2

August 20

Midwest	4-10	Southeast
New England	ppd.^{†}	West

August 21

Mid-Atlantic	7-2	Great Lakes
Southwest	18-7^{‡}	Northwest
Midwest	2-3	New England

August 22

Southwest	12-2^{‡} (5 innings)	Great Lakes
Southeast	0-11^{‡} (5 Innings)	West
Northwest	8-3	Mid-Atlantic

August 23

Midwest	0-13^{‡} (5 innings)	West
New England	4-5	Southeast

August 24

New England	0-8	West
Southwest	13-1^{‡}	Mid-Atlantic
Northwest	2-3 (5 innings)	Great Lakes

=== International ===
Pool C
Region	Record
Latin America	3-0
Asia	2-1
Canada	1-2
EMEA	0-3

Pool D
Region	Record
Caribbean	3-0
Mexico	2-1
Transatlantic	1-2
Pacific	0-3

August 20

Latin America	12-2^{‡} (5 innings)	Canada

August 21

Caribbean	3-2	Mexico
Transatlantic	4-1	Pacific
EMEA	0-18^{‡}	Asia

August 22

Latin America	9-0	EMEA
Transatlantic	0-1	Mexico

August 23

Pacific	3-6	Mexico
Caribbean	6-1	Transatlantic
Canada	2-7	Asia

August 24

Caribbean	3-0	Pacific
Canada	5-1	EMEA
Latin America	6-2	Asia

=== Elimination rounds ===
Quarter-finals
August 25 - Lamade (F/7)
Willemstad, Curaçao	9
Kaohsiung, Taiwan	8
August 26 - Lamade
Panama City, Panama	2
Guadalupe, Mexico	6
August 25 - Lamade
Richmond, Texas	8
Morganton, North Carolina	2
August 26 - Lamade
Thousand Oaks, California	3
Preston, Maryland	1

Semi-finals
August 28 - Lamade
Willemstad, Curaçao	4
Guadalupe, Mexico	0
August 28 - Lamade
Richmond, Texas	0
Thousand Oaks, California	4

Final
August 29 - Lamade
Willemstad, Curaçao	5
(United States) Thousand Oaks, California	2
Third place
August 29 - Volunteer
(United States) Richmond, Texas	5
Guadalupe, Mexico	0

2004 Little League World Series Champions
Pabao Little League
Willemstad, Curaçao

== Notable players ==
- Christian Bethancourt (Panama City, Panama) professional baseball catcher
- Michael Conforto (Redmond, Washington) professional baseball outfielder
- Randal Grichuk (Richmond, Texas) professional baseball outfielder
- Hsu Chi-hung (Kaohsiung, Taiwan) professional baseball infielder
- Jurickson Profar (Willemstad, Curacao) professional baseball infielder
- Jonathan Schoop (Willemstad, Curacao) professional baseball infielder
- Wei-Chung Wang (Kaohsiung, Taiwan) professional baseball pitcher

== Champions path ==
Round	Opposition	Result
Caribbean Regional
Group Stage	(Sint Maarten) Philipsburg LL	13-3
Group Stage	(Dominican Republic) Virgilio Jiménez LL	10-4
Group Stage	(British Virgin Islands) BVI LL	4-3
Group Stage	Aruba South LL	4-1
Semifinals	(United States Virgin Islands) Elrod Hendricks LL	3-0
Caribbean Championship	Aruba North LL	6-0

=== Notes ===
- † Postponed (rained out)
- ‡ Game ended by "mercy rule" (at least 10-run difference through 4 innings)
