= 1947 Little League World Series =

Children's baseball tournament

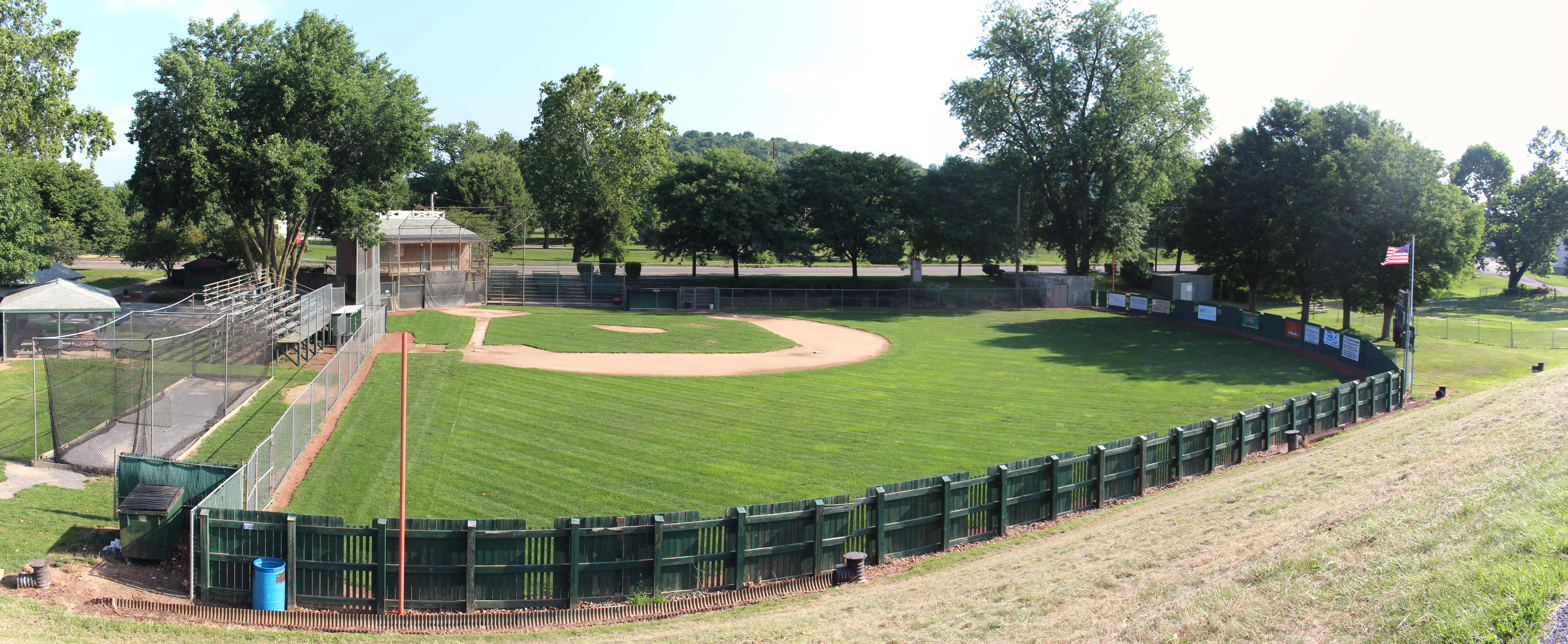
- Original Little League Field in 2016

Tournament details
- Dates: August 21–August 23
- Teams: 12

Final positions
- Champions: (Pennsylvania) Maynard League
- Runners-up: (Pennsylvania) Lock Haven

The 1947 Little League World Series took place from August 21 through August 23, when the first Little League Baseball championship tournament was played at Williamsport, Pennsylvania. The Maynard Midgets of Williamsport, Pennsylvania, defeated the Lock Haven All Stars of Lock Haven, Pennsylvania, 16–7 to win the championship. The event was called the National Little League Tournament, as the "World Series" naming was not adopted until 1949.

In 1947, the board of directors for the original Little League decided to organize a tournament for the 17 known Little League programs. The fields on which the games were played are between the street and a levee built to protect the town from the West Branch Susquehanna River. That levee provided most of the seating for the inaugural series' attendees. Although the Little League World Series has now moved to a stadium in South Williamsport, it's still possible to play baseball on the original field.

The inaugural series was important in history in that it was integrated at a time when professional baseball was still integrating. More than 2,500 spectators enjoyed the final game, which helped to increase the League's overall publicity.

== Teams ==
Williamsport teams

- (Pennsylvania) Original League
- (Pennsylvania) Sunday School League
- (Pennsylvania) Brandon League
- (Pennsylvania) Maynard League
- (Pennsylvania) Lincoln League
- Montoursville, Pennsylvania
- Montgomery, Pennsylvania
- Jersey Shore, Pennsylvania
- Milton, Pennsylvania
- Perry County, Pennsylvania
- Hammonton, New Jersey
- Lock Haven, Pennsylvania

States represented at the 1947 Little League World Series

== Results ==
First round August 21–22
1	(Pennsylvania) Original League	15
16	(Pennsylvania) Sunday School League	0
8	(Pennsylvania) Lincoln League	7
9	(Pennsylvania) Montoursville	2
5	(Pennsylvania) Brandon League	14
12	(Pennsylvania) Montgomery	2
4	(Pennsylvania) Maynard League	8
13	(Pennsylvania) Jersey Shore	1

Second round August 22
(New Jersey) Hammonton	6
(Pennsylvania) Milton	4
(Pennsylvania) Lock Haven	8
(Pennsylvania) Perry County	6
(Pennsylvania) Original League	4
(Pennsylvania) Lincoln League	7
(Pennsylvania) Brandon League	4
(Pennsylvania) Maynard League	10

Semifinals; August 23
(New Jersey) Hammonton	1
(Pennsylvania) Lock Haven	5
(Pennsylvania) Lincoln League	1
(Pennsylvania) Maynard League	2

Final; August 23
(Pennsylvania) Lock Haven	7
(Pennsylvania) Maynard League	16

Rain on August 21 caused two first round games to be played on August 22.

== Notable players ==
- Jack Losch of the Maynard League championship team went on to play college football with the Miami Hurricanes, and was a first-round selection in the 1956 NFL draft. That year, with the Green Bay Packers, he became the first LLWS participant to play a professional sport. In 2004, the Team Sportsmanship Award at the LLWS was named in his honor.
