= Jack Losch =

American football player (1934–2004)

- Losch with the Miami Hurricanes football team

No. 25
- Position: Halfback

Personal information
- Born: August 13, 1934; New York City, U.S.
- Died: May 27, 2004 (aged 69); Williamsport, Pennsylvania, U.S.
- Listed height: 6 ft 1 in (1.85 m)
- Listed weight: 205 lb (93 kg)

Career information
- High school: Williamsport
- College: Miami (FL) (1954–1955)
- NFL draft: 1956: 1st round, 8th overall pick

Career history
- Green Bay Packers (1956)

Career NFL statistics
- Rushing yards: 43
- Rushing average: 2.3
- Receptions: 7
- Receiving yards: 85
- Stats at Pro Football Reference

John Losch (August 13, 1934 – May 27, 2004) was an American athlete who was a member of the 1947 Little League World Series championship team, an All-American college football player, and member of the 1956 Green Bay Packers in the National Football League (NFL).

== Little League Baseball ==
Losch was the center fielder for the Maynard Midgets of Williamsport, Pennsylvania, when they clinched the inaugural Little League World Series title against Lock Haven, Pennsylvania, on August 23, 1947.

== Football ==
Losch attended the University of Miami, where he starred in football, baseball, and track. He was an All-American with the Hurricanes football team, playing three seasons (1953–1955) at halfback and defensive back. Losch was inducted to the university's sports hall of fame in 1987. Losch still held some rushing records with Miami at the time of his death in 2004.

Losch was selected in the first round by the Green Bay Packers as the eighth overall pick in the 1956 NFL draft. He played for one season, appearing in 12 games while rushing for 43 yards (2.3 yards per carry) and making seven receptions.

== Post-playing career ==
In April 1957, Losch joined the United States Air Force, where he spent three years as a jet pilot. He did not resume his NFL career, due to an injury. He worked for 37 years at General Motors Corporation, retiring in 1996 as Director of Fleet Services.

=== Legacy ===
Losch died on May 27, 2004. On June 10, 2004, Little League Baseball announced that the Team Sportsmanship Award at the Little League World Series would be named after Losch.
