= Jim Barbieri =

American baseball player (born 1941)

- Outfielder
- Born: September 15, 1941 (age 84); Schenectady, New York, U.S.
- Batted: Left Threw: Right

MLB debut
- July 5, 1966, for the Los Angeles Dodgers

Last MLB appearance
- September 24, 1966, for the Los Angeles Dodgers

MLB statistics
- Batting average: .280
- Home runs: 0
- Runs batted in: 3

NPB statistics
- Batting average: .188
- Home runs: 9
- Runs batted in: 31
- Stats at Baseball Reference

Teams
- Los Angeles Dodgers (1966); Chunichi Dragons (1970)

James Patrick Barbieri (born September 15, 1941) is an American former outfielder in Major League Baseball (MLB) who played for the 1966 Los Angeles Dodgers and appeared in the World Series. He later played in Japan with the Chunichi Dragons in 1970.

Barbieri is one of only a few players in baseball history to win the Little League World Series, and later appear in a major league World Series.

== Early years ==
Barbieri played in two Little League World Series for Schenectady, New York. In 1953, his team lost the championship game to Birmingham, Alabama. In 1954, his team won the championship, defeating Colton, California, in the final. He later threw out the ceremonial first pitch at Game 1 of the 1954 World Series.

== Professional career ==
Barbieri signed with the Los Angeles Dodgers in 1960, and spent that season with two of their lower level farm teams, the Panama City Fliers and the Green Bay Dodgers, batting a combined .296 with eight home runs and 71 RBIs in 123 games. In 1961, he played for the Salem Dodgers, hitting 12 home runs and collecting 49 RBIs while batting .312 in 115 games. Barbieri spent 1962 with the Triple-A Omaha Dodgers, appearing in 115 games while batting .265 with six home runs and 50 RBIs. From 1963 through 1969, Barbieri played for the Triple-A Spokane Indians, appearing in a total of 759 games while batting .279 with 60 home runs and 321 RBIs during seven seasons.

In July 1966, Barbieri was called up to the Dodgers, making his MLB debut on July 5 against the Cincinnati Reds as the starting left fielder; he went 0-for-2 at the plate while collecting a walk and a stolen base. His first major league hit came the next day, a lead-off single off of Milt Pappas of the Reds. Barbieri appeared in a total of 39 regular season games with the Dodgers, including eight starts in right field and nine starts in left field. He batted .280 (23-for-82) while collecting three RBIs and scoring nine runs. The Dodgers won the National League pennant with a 95–67 record, and faced the Baltimore Orioles in the World Series. Barbieri made one appearance; pinch hitting in the pitcher's spot in the fourth inning of Game 1, he struck out against Moe Drabowsky. The Dodgers fell to the Orioles in a four-game sweep.

After returning to Triple-A Spokane for the 1967 through 1969 seasons, Barbieri played for the Chunichi Dragons of Nippon Professional Baseball in 1970, his last season in professional baseball. He played in 93 games for the Dragons, batting .188 with nine home runs and 31 RBIs. A teammate on the Dragons was John Miller, also a former MLB player.

== Post-playing career ==
Barbieri and his wife continued to live in the Spokane, Washington, area and raised four sons. In 2011, Barbieri was an inaugural inductee of the Capital District Baseball Hall of Fame, honoring players, coaches, and umpires from the Schenectady area.
