= 2009 Little League World Series =

Children's baseball tournament

Tournament details
- Dates: August 21–August 30
- Teams: 16

Final positions
- Champions: Park View Little League (United States) Chula Vista, California
- Runners-up: Kuei-Shan Little League; Taoyuan County, Taiwan

The 2009 Little League World Series was the 63rd edition of the Little League World Series, held in South Williamsport, Pennsylvania, from August 21 through August 30, 2009. Eight teams from the United States and eight from the rest of the world competed in the tournament. In the championship game, the United States champions, from Chula Vista, California, defeated the international champions from Taoyuan County, Taiwan. This was the first tournament in which a team representing Chinese Taipei reached the championship game since 1996, and the first championship for a team from the state of California since 1993.

Activision released a video game in advance of the event, Little League World Series Baseball 2009.

== Teams ==
Pool A	Pool B	Pool C	Pool D
(New York (state)) Staten Island, New York; Mid-Atlantic Region; South Shore National Little League	(Massachusetts) Peabody, Massachusetts; New England Region; Peabody Western Little League	Willemstad, Curaçao; Caribbean Region; Pabao Little League	(Germany) Kaiserslautern, Germany; Europe Region; KMC American Little League
(Washington (state)) Mercer Island, Washington; Northwest Region; Mercer Island Little League	(California) Chula Vista, California; West Region; Park View Little League	(Chiba Prefecture) Chiba City, Chiba; Japan Region; Chiba City Little League	Reynosa, Tamaulipas; Mexico Region; Guadalupe Trevino Kelly Little League
(Georgia (U.S. state)) Warner Robins, Georgia; Southeast Region; Warner Robins American Little League	(Texas) San Antonio, Texas; Southwest Region; McAllister Park American Little League	Dhahran, Saudi Arabia; MEA Region; Arabian American Little League	East Vancouver, British Columbia; Canada Region; Hastings Community Little League
(Iowa) Urbandale, Iowa; Midwest Region; Urbandale East Little League	(Kentucky) Russellville, Kentucky; Great Lakes Region; Logan County/Russellville Little League	Maracaibo, Venezuela; Latin America Region; Coquivacoa Little League	Taoyuan, Chinese Taipei (Taiwan); Asia-Pacific Region; Kuei-Shan Little League

- Taiwan participates under the name Chinese Taipei in many sporting events, including Little League Baseball (LLB).

== Results ==
=== Pool play ===
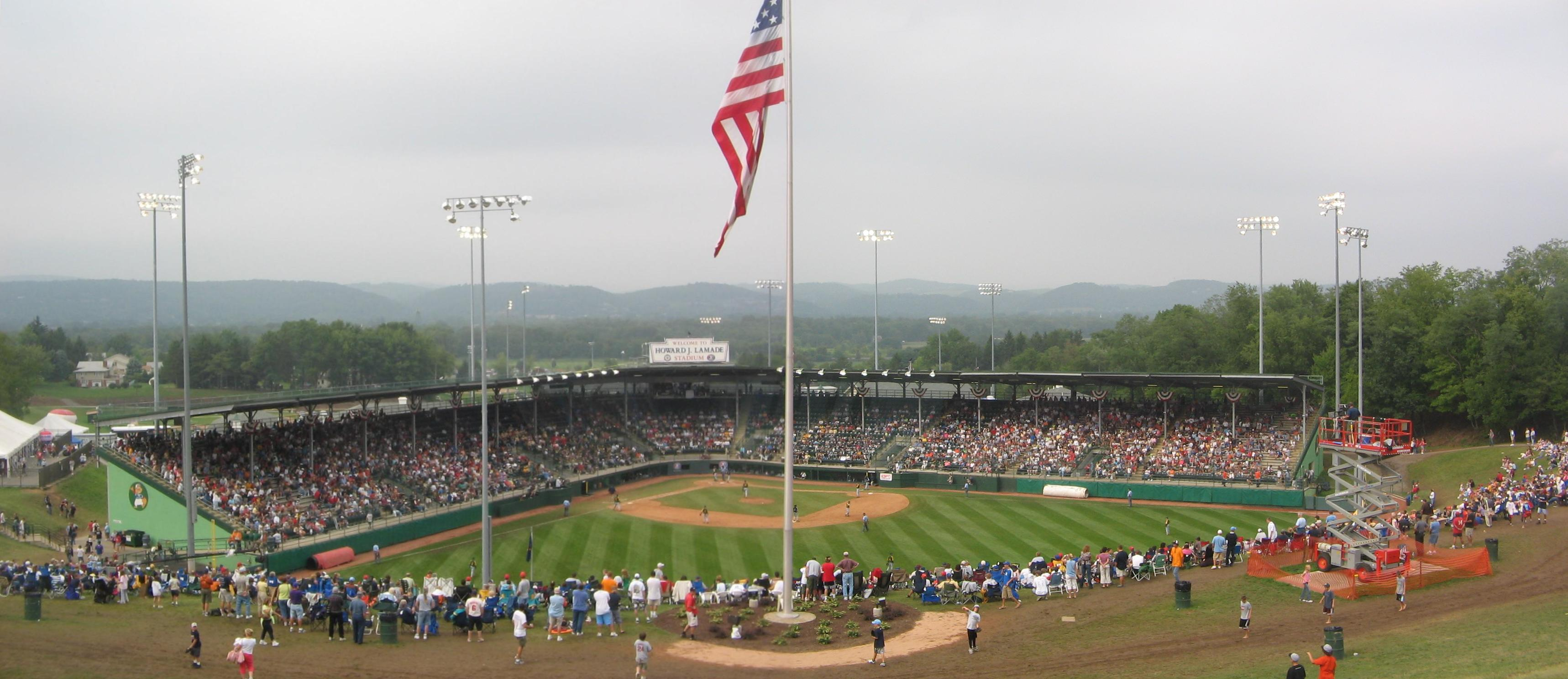
Howard J. Lamade Stadium during the 2009 Little league World Series

The top two teams in each pool moved on to their respective semifinals. The winners of each met on August 30 to play for the Little League World Championship. Teams marked in green qualified to the knockout stage, while the remaining teams were eliminated.

Ties were broken based on records in head-to-head competition among tied teams. In the event of a three-way tie for first place, the tie was broken by calculating the ratio of runs allowed to defensive innings played for all teams involved in the tie. The team with the lowest runs-per-defensive-inning ratio was ranked first and advanced. Second place was determined by the head-to-head result of the other two teams. If the three-way tie was for second place, the runs-per-defensive-inning ratio rule was used. The team with the lowest run ratio advanced; the other two teams were eliminated.

==== United States ====
Pool A
Rank	Region	Record	Runs Allowed	Defensive Innings	Run Ratio
1	(Georgia (U.S. state)) Georgia	3–0	8	18	0.444
2	(New York (state)) New York	2–1	11	18	0.611
3	Iowa	1–2	22	18	1.222
4	(Washington (state)) Washington	0–3	18	18	1.000

Pool B
Rank	Region	Record	Runs Allowed	Defensive Innings	Run Ratio
1	Texas	3–0	4	16	0.250
2	California	2–1	6	17	0.353
3	Massachusetts	1–2	27	17	1.588
4	Kentucky	0–3	39	13	3.000

All times US EDT.

Pool	Away	Score	Home	Score	Time (Venue)
August 21
A	(New York (state)) New York	10	(Washington (state)) Washington	2	1:00 pm (Volunteer Stadium)
A	(Georgia (U.S. state)) Georgia	11	Iowa	3	5:00 pm (Volunteer Stadium)
B	Massachusetts	1	Texas	10	8:00 pm (Lamade Stadium)
August 22
A	(Georgia (U.S. state)) Georgia	6	(New York (state)) New York	3	3:00 pm (Lamade Stadium)
B	Kentucky	0	California	15 (F/5)	8:00 pm (Lamade Stadium)
August 23
A	(Washington (state)) Washington	3	Iowa	5	Noon (Lamade Stadium)
B	Kentucky	0	Texas	12 (F/4)	2:00 pm (Volunteer Stadium)
B	California	14	Massachusetts	0	6:00 pm (Volunteer Stadium)
August 24
A	(Georgia (U.S. state)) Georgia	3	(Washington (state)) Washington	2	4:00 pm (Lamade Stadium)
A	(New York (state)) New York	8	Iowa	3	8:00 pm (Lamade Stadium)
August 25
B	Kentucky	3	Massachusetts	12	4:00 pm (Volunteer Stadium)
B	Texas	6	California	3	8:00 pm (Lamade Stadium)

==== International ====
Pool C
Rank	Region	Record	Runs Allowed	Defensive Innings	Run Ratio
1	Curaçao	3–0	15	18	0.833
2	Japan	2–1	18	18	1.000
3	Saudi Arabia	1–2	9	16	0.813
4	Venezuela	0–3	12	16	0.750

Pool D
Rank	Region	Record	Runs Allowed	Defensive Innings	Run Ratio
1	Mexico	3–0	3	17	0.176
2	Chinese Taipei	2–1	3	16	0.188
3	Canada	1–2	23	18	1.278
4	Germany	0–3	43	14	3.071

All times US EDT.

Pool	Away	Score	Home	Score	Time (Venue)
August 21
D	Chinese Taipei	16	Germany	0 (F/4)	3:00 pm (Lamade Stadium)
August 22
D	Canada	1	Mexico	2 (F/7)	11:00 am (Lamade Stadium)
C	Venezuela	1	Curaçao	2	1:00 pm (Volunteer Stadium)
C	Saudi Arabia	2	Japan	5	6:00 pm (Volunteer Stadium)
August 23
D	Canada	0	Chinese Taipei	8	3:00 pm (Volunteer Stadium)
C	Japan	11	Curaçao	12	8:00 pm (Lamade Stadium)
August 24
D	Mexico	13	Germany	0 (F/4)	Noon (Lamade Stadium)
C	Venezuela	4	Japan	5	2:00 pm (Volunteer Stadium)
C	Saudi Arabia	3	Curaçao	5	6:00 pm (Volunteer Stadium)
August 25
C	Venezuela	3	Saudi Arabia	5	Noon (Lamade Stadium)
D	Canada	14	Germany	13	2:00 pm (Volunteer Stadium)
D	Mexico	3	Chinese Taipei	2	6:00 pm (Volunteer Stadium)

=== Elimination round ===
Quarter-finals
August 26 – 4:00 pm – Lamade
C2 Japan	0
D1 Mexico	6
August 27 – 4:00 pm – Lamade
D2 Chinese Taipei	5
C1 Curaçao	2
August 26 – 8:00 pm – Lamade
A2 (New York (state)) New York	1
B1 Texas	4
August 27 – 8:00 pm – Lamade
B2 California	11
A1 (Georgia (U.S. state)) Georgia	10

Semi-finals
August 29 – Noon – Lamade
Mexico	4
Chinese Taipei	9
August 29 – 7:00 pm – Lamade (F/4)
Texas	2
California	12

Final
August 30 – 3:00 pm – Lamade
Chinese Taipei	3
California	6
Third place
August 30 – 11:00 am – Volunteer
Mexico	5
Texas	4

The United States championship game on August 29 was originally scheduled for 3:00 pm US EDT. After a pair of lengthy rain delays in the international championship game, maintenance required to repair the field for the next game, and to make sure the field was dry enough to play on, it was rescheduled for later that night.

2009 Little League World Series Champions
Park View Little League
Chula Vista, California

== Champions path ==
The Park View Little League won 18 games and lost 2 games to reach the Little League World Series. Overall, their record was 23–3. Their three losses came against Sweetwater Valley LL, Torrance LL (both from California), and McAllister Park American LL (from Texas). Park View became the ninth team and most recent from San Diego County to qualify for the Little League World Series as the last one was Vista, California in 2005. They also were the third team from San Diego County in the past nine years to qualify for the Little League World Series. During the West Regional the team hit 34 home runs in total and was accused of cheating. A Little League Official looked into the allegations but found no evidence to back them up.

Round	Opposition	Result
District 42
Winner's Bracket Quarterfinals	(California) Luckie Waller LL	16–0
Winner's Bracket Semifinals	(California) Imperial Beach LL	17–1
Winner's Bracket Finals	(California) Sweetwater Valley LL	8–1
District 42 Championship	(California) Sweetwater Valley LL	7–10
District 42 Championship	(California) Sweetwater Valley LL	8–2
Section 7
Section 7 Group Stage	(California) Brawley LL	8–5
Section 7 Group Stage	(California) Rancho San Diego LL	9–1
Section 7 Group Stage	(California) Lemon Grove LL	5–3
South California Divisional
Winner's Bracket Semifinals	(California) Corona National LL	14–4
Winner's Bracket Finals	(California) Rancho Santa Margarita LL	5–4 (7 inn.)
South Sub-Divisional Championship	(California) Rancho Santa Margarita LL	16–1
South Championship	(California) Torrance LL	0–18 (4 inn.)
South Championship	(California) Torrance LL	7–6
South Championship	(California) Torrance LL	19–12
West Regional
Group Stage	(Utah) Cedar American LL	27–1 (4 inn.)
Group Stage	(Hawaii) Central East Maui LL	15–2 (4 inn.)
Group Stage	(Arizona) Arrowhead LL	20–1 (4 inn.)
Group Stage	(Nevada) Legacy LL	10–5
Semifinals	(Nevada) Legacy LL	15–2 (4 inn.)
West Region Championship	(California) Lakeside LL	11–4

== Legacy ==
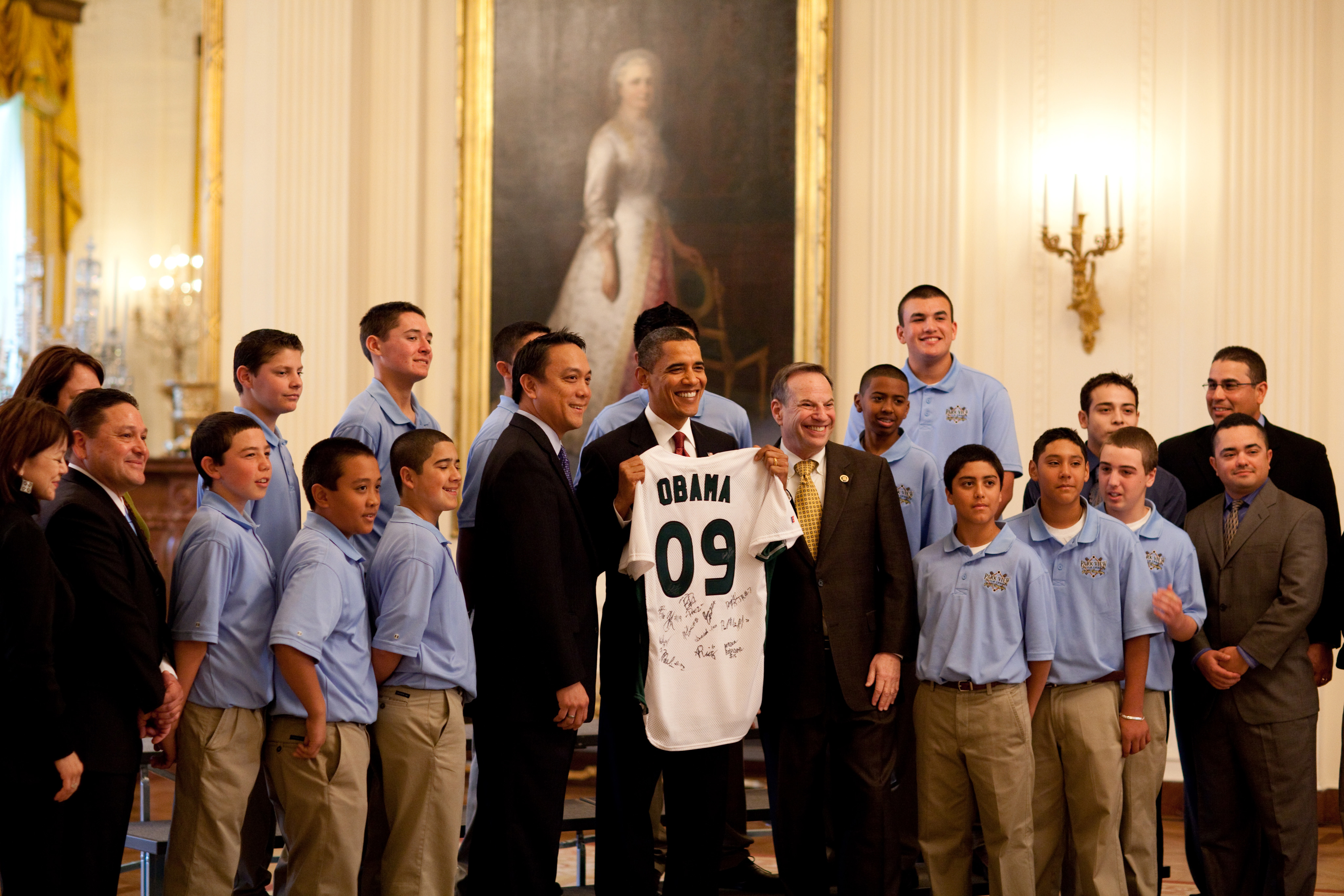
President Barack Obama poses for a picture while holding up a jersey given to him by members of the Little League World Championship team from Chula Vista, Calif., in the East Room of the White House, Feb. 5, 2010. (Official White House Photo by Pete Souza)

The City of Chula Vista organized a celebration parade for the team with the team riding on a fire engine which led them to a rally at Southwestern College. They received a congratulations from Governor Arnold Schwarzenegger. The team also met President Barack Obama in Washington, D.C., and gave him a team jersey, team plaque and the key to the City of Chula Vista. A book was written about the Chula Vista team called The Blue Bombers: The True Story of the 2009 Little League World Champions, written by San Diego County Residents. A memorial wall was proposed to commemorate the team in Chula Vista. The team also appeared on The Tonight Show hosted by Conan O'Brien. The team was honored at San Diego Padres and Chargers games.
