= 2015 Little League World Series =

Children's baseball tournament

Tournament details
- Dates: August 21–August 30
- Teams: 16

Final positions
- Champions: Tokyo Kitasuna Little League; Tokyo, Japan
- Runners-up: (United States) Red Land Little League; Lewisberry, Pennsylvania

The 2015 Little League World Series was held in South Williamsport, Pennsylvania, from August 21 through August 30. Eight teams from the United States and eight from throughout the world competed in the 69th edition of the Little League World Series (LLWS). The Tokyo Kitasuna Little League from Tokyo, Japan, defeated Red Land Little League of Lewisberry, Pennsylvania, in the championship game, 18–11, which was the most total runs scored (29) in any final game. It was Japan's fourth title in the past six years. The tournament was originally scheduled to begin on August 20, however, inclement weather resulted in the postponement of all first-day games, resulting in eight games being played on August 21, a LLWS first.

== Teams ==
| United States | International |
|---|---|
| (Kentucky) Bowling Green, Kentucky; Great Lakes Region; Bowling Green Eastern Little League | (Chinese Taipei) Taipei, Chinese Taipei; Asia-Pacific and Middle East Region; Tung Yuan Little League |
| (Pennsylvania) Lewisberry, Pennsylvania; Mid-Atlantic Region; Red Land Little League | Sydney, New South Wales; Australia Region; Cronulla Little League |
| (Missouri) Webb City, Missouri; Midwest Region; Webb City Little League | White Rock, British Columbia; Canada Region; White Rock South Surrey Little League |
| (Rhode Island) Cranston, Rhode Island; New England Region; Cranston Western Little League | (Dominican Republic) Santiago de los Caballeros, Dominican Republic; Caribbean Region; Los Bravos de Pontezuela Little League |
| (Oregon) Portland, Oregon; Northwest Region; Wilshire/Riverside Little League | (Uganda) Kampala, Uganda; Europe and Africa Region; AVRS Secondary School Little League |
| (South Carolina) Taylors, South Carolina; Southeast Region; Northwood Little League | Tokyo; Japan Region; Tokyo Kitasuna Little League |
| (Texas) Pearland, Texas; Southwest Region; Pearland West Little League | (Venezuela) Barquisimeto, Venezuela; Latin America Region; Cardenales Little League |
| (California) Bonita, California; West Region; Sweetwater Valley Little League | Mexicali, Baja California; Mexico Region; Seguro Social Little League |

- Republic of China, commonly known as Taiwan, due to complicated relations with People's Republic of China, is recognized by the name Chinese Taipei by majority of international organizations including Little League Baseball (LLB). For more information, please see Cross-Strait relations.

== Results ==
The draw to determine the opening round pairings took place on June 10, 2015.

=== United States bracket ===
Upper round 1 | Upper round 2 | Upper final | Final
August 21 – Game 2
Texas | 1
August 23 – Game 14
Oregon | 0
Texas | 8
August 21 – Game 4 (F/4)
California | 4
Kentucky | 2
August 26 – Game 24
California | 14
Texas | 0
August 21 – Game 6
Pennsylvania | 3
South Carolina | 7
August 23 – Game 16
Rhode Island | 1
South Carolina | 8
August 21 – Game 8 (F/4)
Pennsylvania | 9
Pennsylvania | 18 | August 29 – U.S. championship
Missouri | 0 | Pennsylvania | 3
Texas | 2
Lower round 1 | Lower round 2 | Lower round 3 | Lower final
August 24 – Game 18
August 22 – Game 10 | South Carolina | 3 | August 27 – Game 26 (F/8)
Oregon | 5 | Kentucky | 4 | August 25 – Game 22 | Texas | 9
Kentucky | 7 | Kentucky | 3 | California | 7
August 24 – Game 20 | California | 11
August 22 – Game 12 | California | 10
Rhode Island | 6 | Rhode Island | 3
Missouri | 3

=== International bracket ===
Upper round 1 | Upper round 2 | Upper final | Final
August 21 – Game 1
Uganda | 4
August 23 – Game 13
Dominican Republic | 1
Uganda | 0
August 21 – Game 3
Venezuela | 7
Venezuela | 5
August 26 – Game 23 (F/8)
Australia | 2
Venezuela | 4
August 21 – Game 5
Japan | 5
Canada | 0
August 23 – Game 15
Mexico | 1
Mexico | 1
August 21 – Game 7
Japan | 3
Japan | 7 | August 29 – Intl. championship (F/7)
Chinese Taipei | 5 | Japan | 1
Mexico | 0
Lower round 1 | Lower round 2 | Lower round 3 | Lower final
August 24 – Game 17 (F/4)
August 22 – Game 9 | Mexico | 14 | August 27 – Game 25
Australia | 3 | Australia | 3 | August 25 – Game 21 (F/5) | Venezuela | 0
Dominican Republic | 0 | Mexico | 11 | Mexico | 11
August 24 – Game 19 | Chinese Taipei | 1
August 22 – Game 11 (F/4) | Uganda | 0
Chinese Taipei | 16 | Chinese Taipei | 5
Canada | 4

=== Crossover games ===
Teams that lost their first two games played a crossover game against a team from the other side of the bracket that also lost its first two games. These games were labeled Game A and Game B. This provided teams who were already eliminated the opportunity to play a third game.

| Game A |
| August 24 – Lamade Stadium |
| Oregon | 3 |
| Dominican Republic | 7 |

| Game B |
| August 25 – Lamade Stadium |
| Missouri | 18 |
| Canada | 6 |

=== Third place game ===
The third place game is played between the loser of the United States championship and the loser of the International championship.

| Third place game |
| August 30 – Lamade Stadium |
| Texas | 6 |
| Mexico | 4 |

=== World Championship ===
| World Championship |
| August 30 – Lamade Stadium |
| Japan | 18 |
| Pennsylvania | 11 |

2015 Little League World Series Champions
Tokyo Kitasuna Little League
Tokyo, Japan

== Champions path ==
The Kitasuna LL reached the LLWS with an undefeated record of eight wins and no losses. In total, their record was 13-0.

| Round | Opposition | Result |
All-Tokyo Tournament
| Opening Round | Ehime Konan LL | 10–0 (F/5) |
| Quarterfinals | Fuji LL | 10–0 (F/5) |
| Semifinals | Nagano Minami LL | 4–1 |
| Japan Championship | Hachioji LL | 20–3 (F/4) |
Japan Regional Tournament
| Opening Round | (Ehime Prefecture) Ehime Konan LL | 10–0 |
| Quarterfinals | (Shizuoka Prefecture) Fuji LL | 10–0 (F/5) |
| Semifinals | (Nagano Prefecture) Nagano Minami | 4–1 |
| Finals | (Tokyo) Hachioji | 20–3 (F/4) |

== Notable players ==
- Jeferson Quero (Venezuela) - Catcher for the Milwaukee Brewers
- Emmanuel Rodriguez (Dominican Republic) - Outfielder for the Minnesota Twins
- Matt Wilkinson (Canada) - Pitcher for the San Francisco Giants
