= Billy Connors =

American baseball player, coach, and executive (1941–2018)

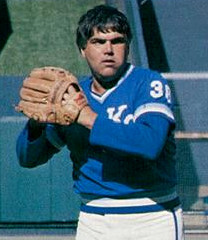
- Connors in 1980
- Pitcher
- Born: November 2, 1941; Schenectady, New York, U.S.
- Died: June 18, 2018 (aged 76); Safety Harbor, Florida, U.S.
- Batted: Right Threw: Right

MLB debut
- May 3, 1966, for the Chicago Cubs

Last MLB appearance
- August 28, 1968, for the New York Mets

MLB statistics
- Win–loss record: 0–2
- Earned run average: 7.53
- Strikeouts: 24
- Stats at Baseball Reference

Teams
- As player: Chicago Cubs (1966); New York Mets (1967–1968); As coach: Kansas City Royals (1980–1981); Chicago Cubs (1982–1986); Seattle Mariners (1987–1988); New York Yankees (1989–1990); Chicago Cubs (1991–1993); New York Yankees (1994–1995)

William Joseph Connors (November 2, 1941 – June 18, 2018) was an American player, coach and front office official in professional baseball. A pitcher born in Schenectady, New York, he threw and batted right-handed, stood 6 feet (1.8 m) tall and weighed 220 pounds (100 kg) in his playing days.

== Playing career ==
When he was 12, Connors was a member of the Schenectady All-Star team that won the 1954 Little League World Series, beating the team from Colton, California, 7–5. He graduated from Linton High School in Schenectady in 1959 and attended Syracuse University for two years. He signed with the Chicago Cubs as a pitcher-infielder in 1961. During a season split between the Class B Northwest League and the Class D Sophomore League, Connors batted only .226 with no home runs and 32 runs batted in while hurling 29 innings as a pitcher. In 1962 in the Class D Florida State League, Connors was converted to pitcher-catcher, and improved his batting mark to .296 with two homers and 35 RBI. He also increased his pitching load to 64 innings and posted a 2.64 earned run average. In 1963, back in the Northwest League, he became a full-time pitcher, winning 12 games and notching 138 strike outs.

During 1966, a season in which he compiled the fourth-lowest ERA in the Pacific Coast League, Connors was recalled by the Cubs, pitching in 16 innings over 11 games, but he failed to stick with Chicago and was sent back to the PCL for 1967. His contract was purchased by the New York Mets in August of that year, and he spent the remainder of his active career with the Mets (27 innings pitched in 1967–1968) and their farm teams. In his 26 Major League games, Connors worked in 43 innings and posted an 0–2 won/lost mark and an ERA of 7.53.

== Coach and front-office executive ==
Connors' off-field career began in 1971 as the Mets' batting practice pitcher. He then became a minor league pitching instructor for the Mets (1972–76) and Philadelphia Phillies (1977–79) before embarking on a 17-year career as a pitching coach in Major League Baseball. He served with the Kansas City Royals (1980–81), Cubs (1982–86; 1991–93), Seattle Mariners (1987–88), and three terms with the New York Yankees (1989–90; 1994–95; 2000). His brief term in 2000 came on an interim basis during the medical leave of absence of longtime Yanks' coach Mel Stottlemyre.

From 1996 to 2012, as vice president, player personnel, Connors was a member of the Yankees' front office, holding a senior position in the Bombers' player development system and based in the team's Tampa, Florida, minor league headquarters, working alongside Mark Newman, the club's longtime player development boss, and in close proximity to the team's owners, the George Steinbrenner family. He was reassigned by the Yankees in September 2012.

Connors died June 18, 2018.

Preceded by Galen Cisco	Kansas City Royals pitching coach 1980–1981	Succeeded by Cloyd Boyer
Preceded by Les Moss; Dick Pole	Chicago Cubs pitching coach 1982–1986; 1991–1993	Succeeded by Herm Starrette; Moe Drabowsky
Preceded by Phil Regan	Seattle Mariners pitching coach 1987–1988	Succeeded by Mike Paul
Preceded by Clyde King; Mark Connor; Mel Stottlemyre	New York Yankees pitching coach 1989–1990; 1994–1995; 2000 (interim)	Succeeded by Mark Connor; Nardi Contreras; Mel Stottlemyre
