= 2005 Little League World Series =

Children's baseball tournament

Tournament details
- Dates: August 19–August 28
- Teams: 16

Final positions
- Champions: West Oahu Little League (United States) ʻEwa Beach, Hawaii
- Runners-up: Pabao Little League; Willemstad, Curaçao

The 2005 Little League World Series took place between August 19 and August 28 in South Williamsport, Pennsylvania. The West Oahu Little League of ʻEwa Beach, Hawaii, defeated the defending champion Pabao Little League of Willemstad, Curaçao, in the championship game of the 59th Little League World Series. This was the second time that the championship game was won with a walk-off home run, which Michael Memea hit in the bottom of the 7th inning.

The tournament used two venues, both in South Williamsport:

- Howard J. Lamade Stadium – the main stadium, completed in 1959, with seating capacity for 10,000 in the main stands and hillside terrace seating for up to 30,000 more
- Little League Volunteer Stadium – opened in 2001; seats approximately 5,000

== Qualification ==
Between five and twelve teams take part in 16 regional qualification tournaments, which vary in format depending on region. In the United States, the qualification tournaments are in the same format as the Little League World Series itself: a round-robin tournament followed by an elimination round to determine the regional champion.

Pool A	Pool B	Pool C	Pool D
(Hawaii) ʻEwa Beach, Hawaii; Northwest Region; West Oahu Little League	(California) Vista, California; West Region; Rancho Buena Vista Little League	(Guam) Mangilao-Barrigada, Guam; Pacific Region; Central East Little League	(Chiba Prefecture) Chiba City, Japan; Asia Region; Chiba City Little League
(Florida) Maitland, Florida; Southeast Region; Maitland Little League	(Louisiana) Lafayette, Louisiana; Southwest Region; Lafayette Little League	Surrey, British Columbia; Canada Region; Whalley Little League	(Curaçao) Willemstad, Curaçao; Caribbean Region; Pabao Little League
(Pennsylvania) Newtown, Pennsylvania; Mid-Atlantic Region; Council Rock Little League	(Maine) Westbrook, Maine; New England Region; Westbrook Little League	(Baja California) Mexicali; Mexico Region; Seguro Social Little League	(Venezuela) Valencia, Venezuela; Latin America Region; Los Leones Little League
(Iowa) Davenport, Iowa; Midwest Region; Northwest Little League	(Kentucky) Owensboro, Kentucky; Great Lakes Region; Southern Little League	(Russia) Moscow, Russia; EMEA Region; Brateevo Little League	(Saudi Arabia) Dhahran, Saudi Arabia; Transatlantic Region; Arabian-American Little League

== Results ==
=== Pool play ===
The top two teams in each pool moved on to their respective semifinals. The winners of each met on August 28 to play for the Little League world championship.

==== United States ====
Pool A
Rank	Region	Record
1	Hawaii	3–0
2	Florida	2–1
3	Pennsylvania	1–2
4	Iowa	0–3

Pool B
Rank	Region	Record
1	California	3–0
2	Louisiana	2–1
3	Maine	1–2
4	Kentucky	0–3

All times US EDT

Pool	Away	Score	Home	Score	Time (Venue)
August 19
A	Hawaii	7	Pennsylvania	1	4:00 pm (Lamade Stadium)
A	Florida	7	Iowa	3	8:00 pm (Volunteer Stadium)
August 20
B	Maine	2	Louisiana	3	11:00 am (Volunteer Stadium)
B	California	7	Kentucky	2	3:00 pm (Volunteer Stadium)
A	Florida	3	Pennsylvania	1	8:00 pm (Lamade Stadium)
August 21
B	Kentucky	8	Louisiana	9	1:00 pm (Lamade Stadium)
A	Iowa	3	Hawaii	7	3:00 pm (Volunteer Stadium)
B	Maine	3	California	7	8:00 pm (Lamade Stadium)
August 22
A	Hawaii	10	Florida	0	3:00 pm (Lamade Stadium)
B	Iowa	0	Pennsylvania	15 (F/4)	8:00 pm (Lamade Stadium)
August 23
B	Kentucky	2	Maine	3	3:00 pm (Lamade Stadium)
B	Louisiana	3	California	9	7:30 pm (Lamade Stadium)

==== International ====
Pool C
Rank	Region	Record
1	Guam	3–0
2	Canada	2–1
3	Mexico	1–2
4	Russia	0–3

Pool D
Rank	Region	Record
1	Japan	3–0
2	Curaçao	2–1
3	Venezuela	1–2
4	Saudi Arabia	0–3

All times US EDT

Pool	Away	Score	Home	Score	Time (Venue)
August 19
C	Guam	6	Russia	2	6:00 pm (Volunteer Stadium)
August 20
D	Japan	3	Saudi Arabia	0	1:00 pm (Lamade Stadium)
D	Curaçao	5 (F/8)	Venezuela	4	4:00 pm (Lamade Stadium)
C	Canada	2	Mexico	0	6:00 pm (Volunteer Stadium)
August 21
C	Canada	0	Guam	5	5:00 pm (Lamade Stadium)
D	Japan	9	Curaçao	0	7:00 pm (Volunteer Stadium)
August 22
C	Russia	0	Mexico	7	11:00 am (Lamade Stadium)
D	Japan	7	Venezuela	4	1:00 pm (Volunteer Stadium)
D	Saudi Arabia	0	Curaçao	3	6:00 pm (Volunteer Stadium)
August 23
C	Canada	2	Russia	1	11:00 am (Lamade Stadium)
D	Saudi Arabia	0	Venezuela	4	1:00 pm (Volunteer Stadium)
C	Guam	5	Mexico	3	6:00 pm (Volunteer Stadium)

=== Elimination round ===
Quarter-finals
August 24 - Lamade (F/5)
Japan	11
Canada	0
August 25 - Lamade (F/5)
Guam	1
Curaçao	16
August 24 - Lamade
California	6
Florida	2
August 25 - Lamade
Hawaii	2
Louisiana	0

Semi-finals
August 27 - Lamade
Japan	0
Curaçao	2
August 27 - Lamade
California	1
Hawaii	6

Final
August 28 - Lamade (F/7)
Curaçao	6
Hawaii	7
Third place
August 28 - Volunteer
Japan	4
California	5

2005 Little League World Series Champions
West Oahu Little League
ʻʻEwa Beach, Hawaii

== Notable players ==
- Dante Bichette Jr. (Southeast) - Professional baseball player, brother of Bo Bichette and son of Dante Bichette
- Johnny Dee (West) - Basketball player for CB Sevilla of the Liga ACB
- Max Moroff (Southeast) - Infielder for the Pittsburgh Pirates and Cleveland Indians
- Jurickson Profar (Caribbean) - Infielder for the Colorado Rockies and San Diego Padres
- Andrew Stevenson (Southwest) - Outfielder for the Washington Nationals, Minnesota Twins, and Hokkaido Nippon-Ham Fighters

Coaches

- Dante Bichette (Southeast) - Former outfielder for the Colorado Rockies
- Mike Stanley (Southeast) - Former catcher for the New York Yankees

== Champion's path ==
Round	Opposition	Result
Hawaii State Tournament
Winner's Bracket Semifinals	(Hawaii) Pearl City LL	4–0
Winner's Bracket Finals	(Hawaii) Hilo National LL	7–5
Championship	(Hawaii) Pearl City LL	5–2
Northwest Regional
Group Stage	(Oregon) Murrayhill LL	17–1
Group Stage	(Idaho) Northwest Ada LL	16–5 (5 inn.)
Group Stage	(Montana) Heights National LL	26–7 (4 inn.)
Group Stage	(Alaska) Dimond-West LL	10–0 (4 inn.)
Semifinals	(Oregon) Murrayhill LL	6–5
West Region Championship	(Idaho) Northwest Ada LL	12–1
