= 2017 Little League World Series results =

Children's baseball competition results

The results of the 2017 Little League World Series were determined between August 17 and August 27, 2017 in South Williamsport, Pennsylvania. 16 teams were divided into two groups, one with eight teams from the United States and another with eight international teams, with both groups playing a modified double-elimination tournament. In each group, the last remaining undefeated team faced the last remaining team with one loss, with the winners of those games advancing to play for the Little League World Series championship.

Double-Elimination
United States
United States	Winner's bracket						
United States	(Connecticut) CT 7◄ (New Jersey) NJ 6 Linescore	(Michigan) MI 1 (Texas) TX 5◄ Linescore	(Washington (state)) WA 0 (California) CA 9◄ Linescore	(North Carolina) NC 6◄ (South Dakota) SD 0 Linescore	(Connecticut) CT 3 (Texas) TX 6◄ Linescore	(North Carolina) NC 16◄ (California) CA 0 (F/5); Linescore	(Texas) TX 1 (F/7) (North Carolina) NC 2◄ Linescore
United States	Loser's bracket						
United States	(New Jersey) NJ 15◄ (Michigan) MI 5 (F/4); Linescore	(Washington (state)) WA 4◄ (South Dakota) SD 3 Linescore	(New Jersey) NJ 12◄ (California) CA 9 Linescore	(Washington (state)) WA 6 (Connecticut) CT 14◄ Linescore	(New Jersey) NJ 2 (Connecticut) CT 12◄ Linescore	(Connecticut) CT 4 (F/5) (Texas) TX 14◄ Linescore	
International
International	Winner's bracket						
International	(Mexico) MEX 1 (Venezuela) VEN 4◄ Linescore	(Canada) CAN 12◄ (Italy) ITA 2 (F/4); Linescore	(Australia) AUS 0 (Japan) JPN 8◄ Linescore	(South Korea) KOR 10◄ (Dominican Republic) DOM 1 Linescore	(Canada) CAN 7◄ (Venezuela) VEN 3 Linescore	(South Korea) KOR 1 (Japan) JPN 4◄ Linescore	(Canada) CAN 0 (F/5) (Japan) JPN 10◄ Linescore
International	Loser's bracket						
International	(Mexico) MEX 13◄ (Italy) ITA 0 Linescore	(Dominican Republic) DOM 8◄ (Australia) AUS 7 Linescore	(South Korea) KOR 0 (Mexico) MEX 1◄ Linescore	(Dominican Republic) DOM 2 (Venezuela) VEN 3◄ Linescore	(Mexico) MEX 8◄ (Venezuela) VEN 0 Linescore	(Canada) CAN 2 (Mexico) MEX 6◄ Linescore	
Consolation games	Italy 7 Michigan 11◄ Linescore				South Dakota 7 Australia 11◄ Linescore		
Single-Elimination
International championship	Mexico 0 Japan 5◄ Linescore						
United States championship	Texas 6◄ North Carolina 5 Linescore						
Third place game	Mexico 14◄ North Carolina 8 Linescore						
World championship	Texas 2 (F/5); Japan 12◄ Linescore						

== Double-elimination stage ==
=== United States ===
Upper round 1	Upper round 2	Upper final	Final
August 17 – Game 2
New Jersey	6
August 20 – Game 14
Connecticut	7
Connecticut	3
August 17 – Game 4
Texas	6
Texas	5
August 23 – Game 24 (F/7)
Michigan	1
Texas	1
August 18 – Game 6
North Carolina	2
(Washington (state)) Washington	0
August 20 – Game 16 (F/5)
California	9
California	0
August 18 – Game 8
North Carolina	16
South Dakota	0	August 26 – U.S. championship
North Carolina	6	North Carolina	5
Texas	6
Lower round 1	Lower round 2	Lower round 3	Lower final
August 21 – Game 18
August 19 – Game 10 (F/4)	California	9	August 24 – Game 26 (F/5)
New Jersey	15	New Jersey	12	August 23 – Game 22 (F/5)	Texas	14
Michigan	5	New Jersey	2	Connecticut	4
August 21 – Game 20	Connecticut	12
August 19 – Game 12	Connecticut	14
Washington	4	Washington	6
South Dakota	3

==== Winner's bracket ====
===== Game 2: Connecticut 7, New Jersey 6 =====
August 17 3:00 pm EDT Howard J. Lamade Stadium
Team	1	2	3	4	5	6	R	H	E
Connecticut ◄	1	1	2	2	0	1	7	11	1
New Jersey	1	0	1	0	0	4	6	7	1
WP: Ethan Righter (1–0) LP: Garrett Drew (0–1) Sv: Tyler Bauer (1); Home runs: CT: None; NJ: Chris Cartnick (1), Tai Mann (1); Boxscore

===== Game 4: Texas 5, Michigan 1 =====
August 17 7:00 pm EDT Howard J. Lamade Stadium
Team	1	2	3	4	5	6	R	H	E
Michigan	0	0	0	0	0	1	1	2	0
Texas ◄	0	1	4	0	0	X	5	7	1
WP: Hunter Ditsworth (1–0) LP: Jack Jones (0–1); Home runs: MI: Will Pflaum (1); TX: Clayton Wigley (1), Hunter Ditsworth (1), Collin Ross 2 (2); Boxscore

===== Game 6: California 9, Washington 0 =====
August 18 4:00 pm EDT Howard J. Lamade Stadium
Team	1	2	3	4	5	6	R	H	E
Washington	0	0	0	0	0	0	0	1	2
California ◄	4	0	1	0	4	X	9	6	0
WP: Bobby Gray (1–0) LP: Caiden Thomsen (0–1); Home runs: WA: None; CA: Joey Gray (1); Boxscore

===== Game 8: North Carolina 6, South Dakota 0 =====
August 18 8:00 pm EDT Howard J. Lamade Stadium
Team	1	2	3	4	5	6	R	H	E
North Carolina ◄	0	1	4	0	1	0	6	8	0
South Dakota	0	0	0	0	0	0	0	0	1
WP: Chase Anderson (1–0) LP: Marcus Phillips (0–1); Notes: North Carolina used three pitchers to combine for a perfect game. Boxscore

===== Game 14: Texas 6, Connecticut 3 =====
August 20 11:00 am EDT Howard J. Lamade Stadium
Team	1	2	3	4	5	6	R	H	E
Connecticut	0	3	0	0	0	0	3	4	0
Texas ◄	1	2	0	2	1	X	6	10	1
WP: Collin Ross (1–0) LP: Michael Iannazzo (0–1); Home runs: CT: Aidan Rivera (1); TX: Christian Mumphery 2 (2); Boxscore

===== Game 16: North Carolina 16, California 0 =====
August 20 2:00 pm EDT Howard J. Lamade Stadium
Team	1	2	3	4	5	6	R	H	E
North Carolina ◄	1	5	0	1	9	–	16	18	0
California	0	0	0	0	0	–	0	0	2
WP: Chase Anderson (2–0) LP: Drew Rutter (0–1); Home runs: NC: JoeJoe Byrne (1), Carson Hardee (1); CA: None; Notes: Completed early due to mercy rule. North Carolina becomes the first U.S. team to pitch consecutive no-hitters at the LLWS. Boxscore

===== Game 24: North Carolina 2, Texas 1 =====
August 23 7:30 pm EDT Howard J. Lamade Stadium
Team	1	2	3	4	5	6	7	R	H	E
Texas	0	0	1	0	0	0	0	1	1	2
North Carolina ◄	1	0	0	0	0	0	1	2	7	1
WP: Matthew Matthijs (1–0) LP: Chip Buchanan (0–1); Home runs: TX: None; NC: Carson Hardee (2); Notes: Winning run scored with 0 outs Boxscore

==== Loser's bracket ====
===== Game 10: New Jersey 15, Michigan 5 =====
August 19 3:00 pm EDT Howard J. Lamade Stadium
Team	1	2	3	4	5	6	R	H	E
New Jersey ◄	0	5	1	9	–	–	15	14	3
Michigan	2	3	0	0	–	–	5	4	1
WP: Chris Andrews (1–0) LP: Will Pflaum (0–1); Home runs: NJ: Chris Cartnick 2 (3); MI: Joey Randazzo (1); Notes: Completed early due to mercy rule. Michigan is eliminated. Boxscore

===== Game 12: Washington 4, South Dakota 3 =====
August 19 9:04 pm EDT Howard J. Lamade Stadium
Team	1	2	3	4	5	6	R	H	E
Washington ◄	3	0	0	0	1	0	4	7	0
South Dakota	1	0	0	0	0	2	3	4	0
WP: Andrew Hall (1–0) LP: Ethan Bruns (0–1); Home runs: WA: None; SD: Marcus Phillips 2 (2); Notes: South Dakota is eliminated. Boxscore

===== Game 18: New Jersey 12, California 9 =====
August 21 3:00 pm EDT Howard J. Lamade Stadium
Team	1	2	3	4	5	6	R	H	E
New Jersey ◄	0	3	9	0	0	0	12	16	2
California	1	0	5	0	0	3	9	11	2
WP: Chris Cartnick (1–0) LP: Joey Gray (0–1); Home runs: NJ: Charlie Meglio (1), R.J. Vashey 2 (2); CA: None; Notes: The game was suspended in the bottom of the 1st inning for 1 hour and 17 minutes due to inclement weather. California is eliminated. Boxscore

===== Game 20: Connecticut 14, Washington 6 =====
August 21 9:17 pm EDT Howard J. Lamade Stadium
Team	1	2	3	4	5	6	R	H	E
Washington	0	2	3	0	1	0	6	5	4
Connecticut ◄	0	2	0	8	4	X	14	12	1
WP: Tyler Bauer (1–0) LP: Drew Coleman (0–1); Home runs: WA: Caiden Thomsen (1); CT: Michael Iannazzo (1), Christian Smith (1); Notes: Washington is eliminated. Boxscore

===== Game 22: Connecticut 12, New Jersey 2 =====
August 23 11:00 am EDT Howard J. Lamade Stadium
Team	1	2	3	4	5	6	R	H	E
New Jersey	0	1	1	0	0	–	2	4	3
Connecticut ◄	5	0	0	4	3	–	12	9	0
WP: Ethan Righter (2–0) LP: Dean Daddio (0–1); Home runs: NJ: None; CT: Troy Ashkinos (1); Notes: Completed early due to mercy rule. New Jersey is eliminated. Boxscore

===== Game 26: Texas 14, Connecticut 4 =====
August 24 7:30 pm EDT Howard J. Lamade Stadium
Team	1	2	3	4	5	6	R	H	E
Connecticut	0	0	2	1	1	–	4	4	4
Texas ◄	8	1	3	0	2	–	14	13	0
WP: Mark Requena (1–0) LP: Matthew Vivona (0–1); Home runs: CT: Michael Iannazzo (2), Matthew Vivona (1); TX: Collin Ross (3); Notes: Completed early due to mercy rule. Connecticut is eliminated. Boxscore

=== International ===
Upper round 1	Upper round 2	Upper final	Final
August 17 – Game 1
Venezuela	4
August 20 – Game 13
Mexico	1
Venezuela	3
August 17 – Game 3 (F/4)
Canada	7
Canada	12
August 23 – Game 23 (F/5)
Italy	2
Canada	0
August 18 – Game 5
Japan	10
Japan	8
August 20 – Game 15
Australia	0
Japan	4
August 18 – Game 7
South Korea	1
Dominican Republic	1	August 26 – International championship
South Korea	10	Japan	5
Mexico	0
Lower round 1	Lower round 2	Lower round 3	Lower final
August 21 – Game 17
August 19 – Game 9 (F/4)	South Korea	0	August 24 – Game 25
Mexico	13	Mexico	1	August 22 – Game 21	Canada	2
Italy	0	Mexico	8	Mexico	6
August 21 – Game 19	Venezuela	0
August 19 – Game 11	Venezuela	3
Australia	7	Dominican Republic	2
Dominican Republic	8

==== Winner's bracket ====
===== Game 1: Venezuela 4, Mexico 1 =====
August 17 1:00 pm EDT Volunteer Stadium
Team	1	2	3	4	5	6	R	H	E
Mexico	0	1	0	0	0	0	1	4	0
Venezuela ◄	0	0	2	0	2	X	4	3	1
WP: Jonney Rosario (1–0) LP: Jorge Garcia (0–1) Sv: Dario Cardozo (1); Home runs: MEX: Andre Garza (1); VEN: None; Boxscore

===== Game 3: Canada 12, Italy 2 =====
August 17 5:00 pm EDT Volunteer Stadium
Team	1	2	3	4	5	6	R	H	E
Canada ◄	1	2	7	2	–	–	12	12	2
Italy	1	0	0	1	–	–	2	3	1
WP: Chase Marshall (1–0) LP: Riccardo Nepoti (0–1); Home runs: CAN: Chase Marshall 2 (2); ITA: None; Notes: Completed early due to mercy rule. Boxscore

===== Game 5: Japan 8, Australia 0 =====
August 18 4:00 pm EDT Volunteer Stadium
Team	1	2	3	4	5	6	R	H	E
Australia	0	0	0	0	0	0	0	2	2
Japan ◄	1	1	1	1	4	X	8	11	0
WP: Tsubasa Tomii (1–0) LP: Tom Stancic (0–1) Sv: Keitaro Miyahara (1); Boxscore

===== Game 7: South Korea 10, Dominican Republic 1 =====
August 18 8:00 pm EDT Volunteer Stadium
Team	1	2	3	4	5	6	R	H	E
South Korea ◄	1	0	3	4	2	0	10	11	1
Dominican Republic	1	0	0	0	0	0	1	2	1
WP: Seong Hyeon Lee (1–0) LP: Angel Genao (0–1) Sv: Jae Hyun Kim (1); Home runs: KOR: Ye Joon Khym (1), Dong Heon Kim (1), Jin Won Shin 2 (2); DOM: None; Boxscore

===== Game 13: Canada 7, Venezuela 3 =====
August 20 10:00 am EDT Volunteer Stadium
Team	1	2	3	4	5	6	R	H	E
Canada ◄	3	1	3	0	0	0	7	8	0
Venezuela	2	0	1	0	0	0	3	6	1
WP: Reece Usselman (1–0) LP: Dario Cardozo (0–1); Home runs: CAN: Reid Hefflick (1), Nathaniel Factor (1); VEN: Jonney Rosario (1); Boxscore

===== Game 15: Japan 4, South Korea 1 =====
August 20 1:00 pm EDT Volunteer Stadium
Team	1	2	3	4	5	6	R	H	E
South Korea	1	0	0	0	0	0	1	5	1
Japan ◄	2	0	2	0	0	X	4	5	0
WP: Riku Goto (1–0) LP: Ho Sung Lee (0–1); Boxscore

===== Game 23: Japan 10, Canada 0 =====
August 23 3:00 pm EDT Howard J. Lamade Stadium
Team	1	2	3	4	5	6	R	H	E
Canada	0	0	0	0	0	–	0	1	2
Japan ◄	2	0	4	3	1	–	10	11	0
WP: Tsubasa Tomii (2–0) LP: Reece Usselman (1–1); Home runs: CAN: None; JPN: Yuya Nakajima (1), Natsuki Yajima (1); Notes: Completed early due to mercy rule. Boxscore

==== Loser's bracket ====
===== Game 9: Mexico 13, Italy 0 =====
August 19 1:00 pm EDT Volunteer Stadium
Team	1	2	3	4	5	6	R	H	E
Mexico ◄	2	6	2	3	–	–	13	13	0
Italy	0	0	0	0	–	–	0	0	0
WP: Rosendo Cantu (1–0) LP: Simone Ioli (0–1) Sv: Carlos Garcia (1); Home runs: MEX: Andre Garza (2), Isaac Miranda (1); ITA: None; Notes: Completed early due to mercy rule. Italy is eliminated. Boxscore

===== Game 11: Dominican Republic 8, Australia 7 =====
August 19 6:00 pm EDT Volunteer Stadium
Team	1	2	3	4	5	6	R	H	E
Dominican Republic ◄	0	0	6	0	2	0	8	10	1
Australia	1	1	0	0	2	3	7	8	5
WP: Jesus Chevalier (1–0) LP: Harrison Wheeldon (0–1) Sv: Erick Torres (1); Home runs: DOM: Edward Triunfel (1); AUS: None; Notes: The game was suspended in the top of the 3rd inning for 1 hour and 52 minutes due to inclement weather. Australia is eliminated. Boxscore

===== Game 17: Mexico 1, South Korea 0 =====
August 21 1:00 pm EDT Volunteer Stadium
Team	1	2	3	4	5	6	R	H	E
South Korea	0	0	0	0	0	0	0	1	1
Mexico ◄	0	0	1	0	0	X	1	1	0
WP: Jorge Garcia (1–1) LP: Kyum Ahn (0–1) Sv: Andre Garza (1); Notes: South Korea is eliminated. Boxscore

===== Game 19: Venezuela 3, Dominican Republic 2 =====
August 21 6:00 pm EDT Volunteer Stadium
Team	1	2	3	4	5	6	R	H	E
Dominican Republic	2	0	0	0	0	0	2	1	0
Venezuela ◄	0	0	1	0	0	2	3	7	1
WP: Jorge Daboin (1–0) LP: Edward Uceta (0–1); Notes: The game was suspended in the bottom of the 6th inning for 1 hour and 25 minutes due to inclement weather. Dominican Republic is eliminated. Boxscore

===== Game 21: Mexico 8, Venezuela 0 =====
August 22 3:00 pm EDT Howard J. Lamade Stadium
Team	1	2	3	4	5	6	R	H	E
Mexico ◄	0	5	0	0	3	0	8	7	0
Venezuela	0	0	0	0	0	0	0	2	0
WP: Isaac Miranda (1–0) LP: Jonney Rosario (1–1) Sv: Erick Vazquez (1); Home runs: MEX: Andre Garza (3), Samuel Juarez (1); VEN: None; Notes: Venezuela is eliminated. Boxscore

===== Game 25: Mexico 6, Canada 2 =====
August 24 3:00 pm EDT Howard J. Lamade Stadium
Team	1	2	3	4	5	6	R	H	E
Canada	0	0	1	1	0	0	2	5	0
Mexico ◄	1	1	0	1	3	X	6	9	1
WP: Andre Garza (1–0) LP: Reid Hefflick (0–1) Sv: Samuel Juarez (1); Home runs: CAN: Robert Orr (1); MEX: Jorge Garcia (1), Jorge Lambarria (1); Notes: Canada is eliminated. Boxscore

=== Consolation games ===
==== Game A: Michigan 11, Italy 7 ====
August 21 11:00 am EDT Howard J. Lamade Stadium
Team	1	2	3	4	5	6	R	H	E
Italy	6	1	0	0	0	0	7	9	2
Michigan ◄	7	1	0	2	1	X	11	9	1
WP: Jordan Arseneau (1–0) LP: Riccardo Nepoti (0–2); Home runs: ITA: None; MI: Jordan Arseneau (1), Tommy Schoeck (1); Boxscore

==== Game B: Australia 11, South Dakota 7 ====
August 22 11:00 am EDT Howard J. Lamade Stadium
Team	1	2	3	4	5	6	R	H	E
South Dakota	4	0	0	1	2	0	7	7	1
Australia ◄	3	1	1	1	5	X	11	12	1
WP: Tom Stancic (1–1) LP: Marcus Phillips (0–2); Boxscore

== Single-elimination stage ==
=== International championship: Japan 5, Mexico 0 ===
August 26 12:30 pm EDT Howard J. Lamade Stadium
Team	1	2	3	4	5	6	R	H	E
Mexico	0	0	0	0	0	0	0	5	1
Japan ◄	4	0	0	0	1	X	5	6	0
WP: Riku Goto (2–0) LP: Jorge Garcia (1–2); Home runs: MEX: None; JPN: Keitaro Miyahara (1); Notes: Mexico is eliminated. Boxscore

=== United States championship: Texas 6, North Carolina 5 ===
August 26 3:30 pm EDT Howard J. Lamade Stadium
Team	1	2	3	4	5	6	R	H	E
Texas ◄	0	0	0	2	2	2	6	6	2
North Carolina	0	2	3	0	0	0	5	8	1
WP: Chip Buchanan (1–1) LP: Chase Anderson (2–1); Home runs: TX: Mark Requena (1), Clayton Wigley (2); NC: None; Notes: North Carolina is eliminated. Boxscore

=== Third place game: Mexico 14, North Carolina 8 ===
August 27 10:00 am EDT Howard J. Lamade Stadium
Team	1	2	3	4	5	6	R	H	E
Mexico ◄	0	5	1	8	0	0	14	10	1
North Carolina	0	1	1	6	0	0	8	10	0
WP: Cesar Monjaraz (1–0) LP: Matthew Matthijs (1–1); Home runs: MEX: None; NC: Ashton Byars (1), Carson Hardee (3); Boxscore

=== World championship: Japan 12, Texas 2 ===
August 27 3:00 pm EDT Howard J. Lamade Stadium
Team	1	2	3	4	5	6	R	H	E
Texas	2	0	0	0	0	–	2	3	2
Japan ◄	0	3	0	4	5	–	12	14	0
WP: Tsubasa Tomii (3–0) LP: Chip Buchanan (1–2); Home runs: TX: Hunter Ditsworth (2), Chandler Spencer (1); JPN: Daisuke Hashimoto (1), Keitaro Miyahara (2), Natsuki Yajima (2); Notes: Completed early due to mercy rule. Boxscore
