= 2011 Little League World Series results =

Children's baseball competition results

The results of the 2011 Little League World Series were determined between August 18 and August 28, 2011 in South Williamsport, Pennsylvania. 16 teams were divided into two groups, one with eight teams from the United States and another with eight international teams, with both groups playing a modified double-elimination tournament. In each group, the last remaining undefeated team faced the last remaining team with one loss, with the winners of those games advancing to play for the Little League World Series championship. All times shown are US EDT.

United States
United States	Winner's bracket						
United States	(Montana) MT 6◄ (South Dakota) SD 4 Linescore	(Georgia (U.S. state)) GA 0 (Louisiana) LA 2◄ Linescore	(California) CA 11◄ (Rhode Island) RI 0 Linescore	(Pennsylvania) PA 0 (Kentucky) KY 1◄ Linescore	(Montana) MT 3◄ (Louisiana) LA 1 Linescore	(California) CA 10◄ (Kentucky) KY 0 (F/4); Linescore	(California) CA 0 (F/7) (Montana) MT 1◄ Linescore
United States	Loser's bracket						
United States	(Georgia (U.S. state)) GA 6◄ (South Dakota) SD 3 Linescore	(Rhode Island) RI 0 (Pennsylvania) PA 2◄ Linescore	(Louisiana) LA 0 (F/4) (Pennsylvania) PA 10◄ Linescore	(Georgia (U.S. state)) GA 8◄ (Kentucky) KY 5 (F/9); Linescore	(Georgia (U.S. state)) GA 5 (Pennsylvania) PA 7◄ Linescore	(California) CA 2◄ (Pennsylvania) PA 0 Linescore	
International
International	Winner's bracket						
International	(Mexico) MEX 3◄ (Chinese Taipei) TPE 0 Linescore	(Aruba) ARU 1 (F/4) (Japan) JPN 12◄ Linescore	(Saudi Arabia) SAU 5 (Canada) CAN 6◄ Linescore	(Netherlands) NED 1 (Venezuela) VEN 6◄ Linescore	(Venezuela) VEN 8 ◄ (Canada) CAN 0 Linescore	(Japan) JPN 2 (F/7) (Mexico) MEX 3◄ Linescore	(Mexico) MEX 2◄ (Venezuela) VEN 1 (F/9); Linescore
International	Loser's bracket						
International	(Chinese Taipei) TPE 20◄ (Aruba) ARU 3 (F/4); Linescore	(Saudi Arabia) SAU 4◄ (Netherlands) NED 2 Linescore	(Canada) CAN 5◄ (Chinese Taipei) TPE 3 Linescore	(Japan) JPN 13◄ (Saudi Arabia) SAU 4 Linescore	(Japan) JPN 4◄ (Canada) CAN 0 Linescore	(Japan) JPN 9◄ (Venezuela) VEN 6 Linescore	
Crossover games	South Dakota 0 Aruba 5◄ Linescore				Netherlands 7 Rhode Island 8◄ Linescore		
International championship	Japan 5◄ Mexico 2 Linescore						
United States championship	California 11◄ Montana 2 Linescore						
World championship	Japan 1 California 2◄ Linescore						

== Double-elimination stage ==
=== United States ===
Upper round 1	Upper round 2	Upper final	Final
August 18 – Game 2
Montana	6
August 21 – Game 14
South Dakota	4
Montana	3
August 18 – Game 4
Louisiana	1
(Georgia (U.S. state)) Georgia	0
August 24 – Game 24 (F/7)
Louisiana	2
Montana	1
August 19 – Game 6
California	0
Rhode Island	0
August 21 – Game 15 (F/4)
California	11
California	10
August 19 – Game 7
Kentucky	0
Kentucky	1	August 27 – U.S. championship
Pennsylvania	0	Montana	2
California	11
Lower round 1	Lower round 2	Lower round 3	Lower final
August 22 – Game 18 (F/9)
August 20 – Game 10	Kentucky	5	August 25 – Game 26
South Dakota	3	Georgia	8	August 23 – Game 22	California	2
Georgia	6	Georgia	5	Pennsylvania	0
August 22 – Game 20 (F/4)	Pennsylvania	7
August 20 – Game 12	Pennsylvania	10
Rhode Island	0	Louisiana	0
Pennsylvania	2

==== Winner's bracket ====
===== Game 2: Montana 6, South Dakota 4 =====
August 18 3:00 pm EDT Lamade Stadium
Team	1	2	3	4	5	6	R	H	E
Montana ◄	0	0	1	5	0	0	6	4	1
South Dakota	1	1	0	1	1	0	4	6	0
WP: Cole McKenzie (1–0) LP: Brett Beyer (0–1) Sv: Sean Jones (1); Home runs: MT: None; SD: Hayden McGriff (1), Erik Petry 2 (2); Attendance: 11,400; Boxscore

===== Game 4: Louisiana 2, Georgia 0 =====
August 18 8:00 pm EDT Lamade Stadium
Team	1	2	3	4	5	6	R	H	E
(Georgia (U.S. state)) Georgia	0	0	0	0	0	0	0	7	1
Louisiana ◄	0	0	1	1	0	X	2	6	1
WP: Ethan Hines (1–0) LP: Jacob Giles (0–1) Sv: Haden Erbe (1); Home runs: GA: None; LA: None; Attendance: 10,200; Boxscore

===== Game 6: California 11, Rhode Island 0 =====
August 19 3:00 pm EDT Lamade Stadium
Team	1	2	3	4	5	6	R	H	E
California ◄	1	1	0	1	6	2	11	11	0
Rhode Island	0	0	0	0	0	0	0	3	3
WP: Braydon Salzman (1–0) LP: Max Hanuschak (0–1) Sv: None; Home runs: CA: None; RI: None; Attendance: 14,300; Boxscore

===== Game 7: Kentucky 1, Pennsylvania 0 =====
August 19 8:00 pm EDT Lamade Stadium
Team	1	2	3	4	5	6	R	H	E
Pennsylvania	0	0	0	0	0	0	0	5	0
Kentucky ◄	1	0	0	0	0	X	1	3	0
WP: Griffin McLarty (1–0) LP: Cole Reeder (0–1) Sv: None; Home runs: PA: None; KY: Griffin McLarty (1); Attendance: 41,848; Notes: See notes section.^{1} Boxscore

===== Game 14: Montana 3, Louisiana 1 =====
August 21 2:00 pm EDT Lamade Stadium
Team	1	2	3	4	5	6	R	H	E
Montana ◄	0	0	3	0	0	1	3	5	1
Louisiana	0	0	0	0	0	1	1	5	0
WP: Patrick Zimmer (1–0) LP: Haden Erbe (0–1) Sv: Sean Jones (2); Home runs: MT: None; LA: None; Attendance: 10,555; Boxscore

===== Game 15: California 10, Kentucky 0 =====
August 21 6:00 pm EDT Volunteer Stadium
Team	1	2	3	4	5	6	R	H	E
California ◄	0	5	0	5	–	–	10	12	0
Kentucky	0	0	0	0	–	–	0	2	4
WP: Hagen Danner (1–0) LP: Jacob Bates (0–1) Sv: None; Home runs: CA: None; KY: None; Attendance: 7,550; Notes: Completed early due to mercy rule. Boxscore

===== Game 24: Montana 1, California 0 =====
August 24 8:00 pm EDT Lamade Stadium
Team	1	2	3	4	5	6	7	R	H	E
California	0	0	0	0	0	0	0	0	3	0
Montana ◄	0	0	0	0	0	0	1	1	4	1
WP: Sean Jones (1–0) LP: Braydon Salzman (0–1) Sv: None; Home runs: CA: None; MT: Ben Askelson (1); Attendance: 11,950; Boxscore

==== Loser's bracket ====
===== Game 10: Georgia 6, South Dakota 3 =====
August 20 3:00 pm EDT Lamade Stadium
Team	1	2	3	4	5	6	R	H	E
(Georgia (U.S. state)) Georgia ◄	3	0	1	0	2	0	6	7	0
South Dakota	0	0	0	0	0	3	3	5	0
WP: Logan Arnett (1–0) LP: Cameron Fees (0–1) Sv: Jake Fromm (1); Home runs: GA: Jake Fromm (1); SD: Brett Beyer (1); Attendance: 23,300; Notes: South Dakota is eliminated. Boxscore

===== Game 12: Pennsylvania 2, Rhode Island 0 =====
August 20 8:00 pm EDT Lamade Stadium
Team	1	2	3	4	5	6	R	H	E
Rhode Island	0	0	0	0	0	0	0	3	1
Pennsylvania ◄	1	0	0	0	1	X	2	7	0
WP: Alex Garbrick (1–0) LP: Christopher Wright (0–1) Sv: Tyler McCloskey (1); Home runs: RI: None; PA: None; Attendance: 33,215; Notes: Rhode Island is eliminated. Boxscore

===== Game 18: Pennsylvania 10, Louisiana 0 =====
August 22 8:00 pm EDT Lamade Stadium
Team	1	2	3	4	5	6	R	H	E
Louisiana	0	0	0	0	–	–	0	0	1
Pennsylvania ◄	3	7	0	X	–	–	10	6	0
WP: Landon Breon (1–0) LP: Hunter Bergeron (0–1) Sv: None; Home runs: LA: None; PA: Brandon Miller (1); Notes: Completed early due to mercy rule. Louisiana is eliminated. Boxscore

===== Game 20: Georgia 8, Kentucky 5 =====
August 22 4:00 pm EDT Lamade Stadium
Team	1	2	3	4	5	6	7	8	9	R	H	E
(Georgia (U.S. state)) Georgia ◄	0	0	5	0	0	0	0	0	3	8	10	2
Kentucky	2	0	0	2	1	0	0	0	0	5	9	2
WP: Jake Fromm (1–0) LP: Travis Faith (0–1) Sv: None; Home runs: GA: Jake Fromm (2); KY: Griffin McLarty (2), Travis Faith (1); Notes: Kentucky is eliminated. Boxscore

===== Game 22: Pennsylvania 7, Georgia 5 =====
August 23 8:00 pm EDT Lamade Stadium
Team	1	2	3	4	5	6	R	H	E
(Georgia (U.S. state)) Georgia	3	0	0	2	0	0	5	11	1
Pennsylvania ◄	6	0	1	0	0	X	7	11	1
WP: Trebor Nicodemus (1–0) LP: Jordan Hampton (0–1) Sv: Tyler McCloskey (2); Home runs: GA: Jake Fromm (3); PA: None; Attendance: 32,213; Notes: Georgia is eliminated. Boxscore

===== Game 26: California 2, Pennsylvania 0 =====
August 25 8:00 pm EDT Lamade Stadium
Team	1	2	3	4	5	6	R	H	E
California◄	0	0	1	1	0	0	2	5	0
Pennsylvania	0	0	0	0	0	0	0	4	0
WP: Hagen Danner (2–0) LP: Alex Garbrick (1–1) Sv: Braydon Salzman (1); Home runs: CA: Hagen Danner (1); PA: None; Notes: Pennsylvania is eliminated. Boxscore

=== International ===
Upper round 1	Upper round 2	Upper final	Final
August 18 – Game 1
Chinese Taipei	0
August 21 – Game 13 (F/7)
Mexico	3
Mexico	3
August 18 – Game 3 (F/4)
Japan	2
Aruba	1
August 24 – Game 23 (F/9)
Japan	12
Mexico	2
August 19 – Game 5
Venezuela	1
Saudi Arabia	5
August 21 – Game 16
Canada	6
Canada	0
August 19 – Game 8
Venezuela	8
Netherlands	1	August 27 – Intl. Championship
Venezuela	6	Mexico	2
Japan	5
Lower round 1	Lower round 2	Lower round 3	Lower final
August 22 – Game 17
August 20 – Game 9 (F/4)	Canada	5	August 25 – Game 25
Chinese Taipei	20	Chinese Taipei	3	August 23 – Game 21	Venezuela	6
Aruba	3	Canada	0	Japan	9
August 22 – Game 19	Japan	4
August 20 – Game 11	Japan	13
Saudi Arabia	4	Saudi Arabia	4
Netherlands	2

==== Winner's bracket ====
===== Game 1: Mexico 3, Chinese Taipei 0 =====
August 18 1:00 pm EDT Volunteer Stadium
Team	1	2	3	4	5	6	R	H	E
Mexico ◄	2	0	1	0	0	0	3	6	1
Chinese Taipei	0	0	0	0	0	0	0	2	5
WP: Jorge Jacobo (1–0) LP: Chia-Hao Ko (0–1) Sv: None; Home runs: MEX: None; TPE: None; Attendance: 5,950; Boxscore

===== Game 3: Japan 12, Aruba 1 =====
August 18 5:00 pm EDT Volunteer Stadium
Team	1	2	3	4	5	6	R	H	E
Japan ◄	1	6	1	4	–	–	12	11	0
Aruba	0	0	0	1	–	–	1	3	4
WP: Yoshiki Suzuki (1–0) LP: Gillian Wernet (0–1) Sv: None; Home runs: JPN: Yoshiki Suzuki (1); ARU: None; Attendance: 5,975; Notes: Completed early due to mercy rule. Boxscore

===== Game 5: Canada 6, Saudi Arabia 5 =====
August 19 1:00 pm EDT Volunteer Stadium
Team	1	2	3	4	5	6	R	H	E
Saudi Arabia	0	0	5	0	0	0	5	4	2
Canada ◄	2	0	1	0	2	1	6	9	3
WP: Cole Cantelon (1–0) LP: Gustavo Leon (0–1) Sv: None; Home runs: SAU: None; CAN: None; Attendance: 4,850; Notes: The game was delayed in bottom of the 3rd for 1 hour and 21 minutes due to rain. Boxscore

===== Game 8: Venezuela 6, Netherlands 1 =====
August 19 5:00 pm EDT Volunteer Stadium
Team	1	2	3	4	5	6	R	H	E
Netherlands	0	0	0	0	1	0	1	2	1
Venezuela ◄	0	0	4	0	2	X	6	9	2
WP: Keny Marquez (1–0) LP: Darryl Jamoena (0–1) Sv: Wilson Alvarez (1); Home runs: NED: None; VEN: Omar Conoropo Jr. (1); Attendance: 5,905; Boxscore

===== Game 13: Venezuela 8, Canada 0 =====
August 21 Noon EDT Volunteer Stadium
Team	1	2	3	4	5	6	R	H	E
Venezuela ◄	0	0	3	0	3	2	8	7	1
Canada	0	0	0	0	0	0	0	4	3
WP: Jothson Flores (1–0) LP: Yi-Fan Pan (0–1) Sv: None; Home runs: VEN: Yonny Hernandez 2 (2), Neil Prieto (1); CAN: None; Attendance: 6,640; Boxscore

===== Game 16: Mexico 3, Japan 2 =====
August 21 8:00 pm EDT Lamade Stadium
Team	1	2	3	4	5	6	7	R	H	E
Japan	2	0	0	0	0	0	0	2	4	2
Mexico ◄	0	2	0	0	0	0	1	3	10	4
WP: Carlos Arellano (1–0) LP: Kazuto Takakura (0–1) Sv: None; Home runs: JPN: None; MEX: None; Attendance: 9,850; Boxscore

===== Game 23: Mexico 2, Venezuela 1 =====
August 24 4:00 pm EDT Lamade Stadium
Team	1	2	3	4	5	6	7	8	9	R	H	E
Mexico ◄	1	0	0	0	0	0	0	0	1	2	7	0
Venezuela	1	0	0	0	0	0	0	0	0	1	4	1
WP: Jorge Jacobo (2–0) LP: Yonny Hernandez (0–1) Sv: None; Home runs: MEX: Bruno Ruiz (1); VEN: None; Attendance: 6,475; Boxscore

==== Loser's bracket ====
===== Game 9: Chinese Taipei 20, Aruba 3 =====
August 20 Noon EDT Volunteer Stadium
Team	1	2	3	4	5	6	R	H	E
Chinese Taipei ◄	4	5	7	4	–	–	20	19	0
Aruba	0	0	0	3	–	–	3	7	1
WP: Yu-Kuan Wu (1–0) LP: Anthony Lacle (0–1) Sv: None; Home runs: TPE: Shih-Lung Chen (1); ARU: None; Attendance: 6,075; Notes: Completed early due to mercy rule. Aruba is eliminated. Boxscore

===== Game 11: Saudi Arabia 4, Netherlands 2 =====
August 20 6:00 pm EDT Volunteer Stadium
Team	1	2	3	4	5	6	R	H	E
Saudi Arabia ◄	2	0	1	1	0	0	4	9	0
Netherlands	0	0	2	0	0	0	2	8	2
WP: Gustavo Leon (1–1) LP: Angelo Wicklert (0–1) Sv: Tyler Wilkins (1); Home runs: SAU: None; NED: None; Attendance: 5,530; Notes: Netherlands is eliminated. Boxscore

===== Game 17: Canada 5, Chinese Taipei 3 =====
August 22 2:00 pm EDT Volunteer Stadium
Team	1	2	3	4	5	6	R	H	E
Canada ◄	2	1	0	1	0	1	5	6	2
Chinese Taipei	0	0	3	0	0	0	3	9	2
WP: Yi-An Pan (1–0) LP: Yu-Kuan Wu (1–1) Sv: Cole Cantelon (1); Home runs: CAN: Yi-An Pan (1); TPE: None; Attendance: 6,035; Notes: Chinese Taipei is eliminated. Boxscore

===== Game 19: Japan 13, Saudi Arabia 4 =====
August 22 6:00 pm EDT Volunteer Stadium
Team	1	2	3	4	5	6	R	H	E
Japan ◄	0	3	0	2	0	8	13	14	1
Saudi Arabia	0	4	0	0	0	0	4	6	3
WP: Ryota Matsushida (1–0) LP: Tanner Beachy (0–1) Sv: None; Home runs: JPN: Sotaro Yoshida (1); SAU: None; Attendance: 4,980; Notes: Saudi Arabia is eliminated. Boxscore

===== Game 21: Japan 4, Canada 0 =====
August 23 4:00 pm EDT Lamade Stadium
Team	1	2	3	4	5	6	R	H	E
Japan ◄	0	0	3	1	0	0	4	7	0
Canada	0	0	0	0	0	0	0	5	0
WP: Hiroyasu Sugiura (1–0) LP: Cole Cantelon (0-1) Sv: Takuya Okamoto (1); Home runs: JPN: None; CAN: None; Attendance: 12,046; Notes: Canada is eliminated. Boxscore

===== Game 25: Japan 9, Venezuela 6 =====
August 25 4:00 pm EDT Lamade Stadium
Team	1	2	3	4	5	6	R	H	E
Japan ◄	0	0	3	3	2	1	9	8	2
Venezuela	0	0	0	0	5	1	6	9	2
WP: Kazuto Takakura (1–1) LP: Omar Conoropo Jr. (0–1) Sv: Gaishi Iguchi (1); Home runs: JPN: Yoshiki Suzuki 2 (3), Kazuto Takakura (1); VEN: Elio Narvaez (1); Attendance: 10,250; Notes: Venezuela is eliminated. Boxscore

=== Crossover games ===
==== Game A: Aruba 5, South Dakota 0 ====
August 22 Noon EDT Lamade Stadium
Team	1	2	3	4	5	6	R	H	E
South Dakota	0	0	0	0	0	0	0	4	0
Aruba ◄	2	0	1	0	2	X	5	8	1
WP: Gillian Wernet (1–1) LP: Hayden McGriff (0–1) Sv: None; Home runs: SD: None; ARU: None; Boxscore

==== Game B: Rhode Island 8, Netherlands 7 ====
August 23 1:00 pm EDT Lamade Stadium
Team	1	2	3	4	5	6	R	H	E
Netherlands	0	0	0	0	2	5	7	2	5
Rhode Island ◄	0	0	2	1	0	5	8	7	0
WP: Ryan McCormick (1–0) LP: Angelo Wicklert (0–2) Sv: None; Home runs: NED: Phayson Antonia (1); RI: None; Attendance: 7,800; Boxscore

== Single-elimination stage ==
=== International championship: Japan 5, Mexico 2 ===
August 27 Noon EDT Lamade Stadium
Team	1	2	3	4	5	6	R	H	E
Japan ◄	0	0	2	2	1	0	5	10	2
Mexico	0	0	0	1	1	0	2	7	3
WP: Yoshiki Suzuki (2–0) LP: Jorge Jacabo (2–1) Sv: None; Home runs: JPN: None; MEX: None; Attendance: 10,425; Notes: Mexico is eliminated. Boxscore

=== United States championship: California 11, Montana 2 ===
August 27 3:00 pm EDT Lamade Stadium
Team	1	2	3	4	5	6	R	H	E
California ◄	1	2	0	2	2	4	11	10	3
Montana	0	1	0	0	0	1	2	5	3
WP: Nick Pratto (1–0) LP: Patrick Zimmer (1–1) Sv: None; Home runs: CA: Dylan Palmer (1); MT: Cole McKenzie (1); Attendance: 20,168; Notes: Montana is eliminated. Boxscore

=== Consolation game ===
Due to the impending arrival of Hurricane Irene to the East Coast,
the consolation game was cancelled.

=== World championship: California 2, Japan 1 ===
August 28 3:00 EDT Lamade Stadium
Team	1	2	3	4	5	6	R	H	E
Japan	0	0	1	0	0	0	1	3	1
California ◄	0	0	1	0	0	1	2	6	2
WP: Braydon Salzman (2–1) LP: Kazuto Takakura (1–2) Sv: None; Home runs: JPN: None; CA: Hagen Danner (2); Attendance: 9,156; Boxscore

== Notes ==
1. This game was originally scheduled for Volunteer Stadium at 5:00 pm EDT, but once the Keystone Little League, based about 30 miles (48 km) from South Williamsport, won the Mid-Atlantic Region, the game was moved to Lamade Stadium at 8:00 pm EDT in order to accommodate the expected crowd. Ultimately, the game drew a crowd announced by Little League as 41,848, an all-time record for the LLWS.
