= 2015 Little League World Series results =

Children's baseball competition results

The results of the 2015 Little League World Series were determined between August 21 and August 30, 2015, in South Williamsport, Pennsylvania. The tournament was originally scheduled to begin on August 20, however inclement weather resulted in the postponement of all first day games. 16 teams were divided into two groups, one with eight teams from the United States and another with eight international teams, with both groups playing a modified double-elimination tournament. In each group, the last remaining undefeated team faced the last remaining team with one loss, with the winners of those games advancing to play for the Little League World Series championship.

Double-Elimination
United States
United States	Winner's bracket						
United States	(Texas) TX 1◄ (Oregon) OR 0 Linescore	(Kentucky) KY 2 (F/4) (California) CA 14◄ Linescore	(South Carolina) SC 7◄ (Rhode Island) RI 1 Linescore	(Pennsylvania) PA 18◄ (Missouri) MO 0 (F/4); Linescore	(Texas) TX 8◄ (California) CA 4 Linescore	(South Carolina) SC 8 (Pennsylvania) PA 9◄ Linescore	(Texas) TX 0 (Pennsylvania) PA 3◄ Linescore
United States	Loser's bracket						
United States	(Oregon) OR 5 (Kentucky) KY 7◄ Linescore	(Rhode Island) RI 6◄ (Missouri) MO 3 Linescore	(South Carolina) SC 3 (Kentucky) KY 4◄ Linescore	(California) CA 10◄ (Rhode Island) RI 3 Linescore	(California) CA 11◄ (Kentucky) KY 3 Linescore	(California) CA 7 (F/8) (Texas) TX 9◄ Linescore	
International
International	Winner's bracket						
International	(Uganda) UGA 4◄ (Dominican Republic) DOM 1 Linescore	(Venezuela) VEN 5◄ (Australia) AUS 2 Linescore	(Canada) CAN 0 (Mexico) MEX 1◄ Linescore	(Chinese Taipei) TPE 5 (Japan) JPN 7◄ Linescore	(Venezuela) VEN 7◄ (Uganda) UGA 0 Linescore	(Mexico) MEX 1 (Japan) JPN 3◄ Linescore	(Venezuela) VEN 4 (F/8) (Japan) JPN 5◄ Linescore
International	Loser's bracket						
International	(Australia) AUS 3◄ (Dominican Republic) DOM 0 Linescore	(Chinese Taipei) TPE 16◄ (Canada) CAN 4 (F/4); Linescore	(Mexico) MEX 14◄ (Australia) AUS 3 (F/4); Linescore	(Chinese Taipei) TPE 5◄ (Uganda) UGA 0 Linescore	(Chinese Taipei) TPE 1 (F/5) (Mexico) MEX 11◄ Linescore	(Mexico) MEX 11◄ (Venezuela) VEN 0 Linescore	
Crossover games	Oregon 3 Dominican Republic 7◄ Linescore				Missouri 18◄ Canada 6 Linescore		
Single-Elimination
International Championship	Mexico 0 (F/7); Japan 1◄ Linescore						
United States Championship	Texas 2 Pennsylvania 3◄ Linescore						
Third-place game	Texas 6◄ Mexico 4 Linescore						
World Championship Game	Japan 18◄ Pennsylvania 11; Linescore						

== Double-elimination stage ==
=== United States ===
Upper round 1	Upper round 2	Upper final	Final
August 21 – Game 2
Texas	1
August 23 – Game 14
Oregon	0
Texas	8
August 21 – Game 4 (F/4)
California	4
Kentucky	2
August 26 – Game 24
California	14
Texas	0
August 21 – Game 6
Pennsylvania	3
South Carolina	7
August 23 – Game 16
Rhode Island	1
South Carolina	8
August 21 – Game 8 (F/4)
Pennsylvania	9
Pennsylvania	18	August 29 – U.S. championship
Missouri	0	Pennsylvania	3
Texas	2
Lower round 1	Lower round 2	Lower round 3	Lower final
August 24 – Game 18
August 22 – Game 10	South Carolina	3	August 27 – Game 26 (F/8)
Oregon	5	Kentucky	4	August 25 – Game 22	Texas	9
Kentucky	7	Kentucky	3	California	7
August 24 – Game 20	California	11
August 22 – Game 12	California	10
Rhode Island	6	Rhode Island	3
Missouri	3

==== Winner's bracket ====
===== Game 2: Texas 1, Oregon 0 =====
August 21 11:00 am EDT Howard J. Lamade Stadium
Team	1	2	3	4	5	6	R	H	E
Texas ◄	0	0	0	1	0	0	1	1	0
Oregon	0	0	0	0	0	0	0	1	0
WP: Jarrett Tadlock (1–0) LP: Dylan MacLean (0–1) Sv: Isaac Garcia (1); Home runs: TX: Isaac Garcia (1); OR: None; Boxscore

===== Game 4: California 14, Kentucky 2 =====
August 21 2:00 pm EDT Howard J. Lamade Stadium
Team	1	2	3	4	5	6	R	H	E
Kentucky	0	0	0	2	–	–	2	3	1
California ◄	0	3	11	X	–	–	14	11	0
WP: Dante Schmid (1–0) LP: Eli Burwash (0–1); Home runs: KY: Carson Kelley (1); CA: Dante Schmid (1) Antonio Andrade (1), Nate Nankil (1) Nick Maldonado (1) Levi Mendez (1) Walker Lannom (1); Notes: Completed early due to mercy rule. Boxscore

===== Game 6: South Carolina 7, Rhode Island 1 =====
August 21 5:00 pm EDT Howard J. Lamade Stadium
Team	1	2	3	4	5	6	R	H	E
South Carolina ◄	2	1	1	0	1	2	7	12	1
Rhode Island	1	0	0	0	0	0	1	0	0
WP: Alex Edmondson (1–0) LP: Dylan Demers (0–1); Home runs: SC: Terrence Gist (1), Alex Edmondson (1); RI: None; Notes: Alex Edmondson throws a no-hitter for South Carolina. Boxscore

===== Game 8: Pennsylvania 18, Missouri 0 =====
August 21 8:00 pm EDT Howard J. Lamade Stadium
Team	1	2	3	4	5	6	R	H	E
Pennsylvania ◄	0	10	8	0	–	–	18	16	1
Missouri	0	0	0	0	–	–	0	2	1
WP: Jaden Henline (1–0) LP: Devrin Weathers (0–1); Home runs: PA: Kaden Peifer (1), Cole Wagner 2 (2); MO: None; Notes: Completed early due to mercy rule. Boxscore

===== Game 14: Texas 8, California 4 =====
August 23 3:00 pm EDT Howard J. Lamade Stadium
Team	1	2	3	4	5	6	R	H	E
Texas ◄	1	0	5	0	0	2	8	9	1
California	0	0	1	0	0	3	4	6	5
WP: Ben Gottfried (1–0) LP: Antonio Andrade (0–1); Home runs: TX: Ben Gottfried (1), Raffi Gross (1); CA: Dante Schmid (2); Boxscore

===== Game 16: Pennsylvania 9, South Carolina 8 =====
August 23 7:00 pm EDT Howard J. Lamade Stadium
Team	1	2	3	4	5	6	R	H	E
South Carolina	0	0	0	4	0	4	8	9	1
Pennsylvania ◄	5	1	0	0	0	3	9	6	5
WP: Jaden Henline (2–0) LP: Ryan Soug (0–1); Home runs: SC: Alex Edmondson (2); PA: Kaden Peifer (2); Boxscore

===== Game 24: Pennsylvania 3, Texas 0 =====
August 26 8:00 pm EDT Howard J. Lamade Stadium
Team	1	2	3	4	5	6	R	H	E
Texas	0	0	0	0	0	0	0	5	0
Pennsylvania ◄	1	0	1	0	1	X	3	5	0
WP: Adam Cramer (1–0) LP: Jarrett Tadlock (1–1) Sv: Jaden Henline (1); Home runs: TX: None; PA: Cole Wagner (3); Boxscore

==== Loser's bracket ====
===== Game 10: Kentucky 7, Oregon 5 =====
August 22 3:00 pm EDT Howard J. Lamade Stadium
Team	1	2	3	4	5	6	R	H	E
Oregon	0	0	0	0	0	5	5	5	2
Kentucky ◄	0	0	0	3	4	X	7	6	0
WP: Carson Kelley (1–0) LP: Spencer Scott (0–1) Sv: Carson Myers (1); Home runs: OR: Spencer Scott (1), Cooper Shaw (1); KY: Devin Obee (1); Notes: Oregon is eliminated. Boxscore

===== Game 12: Rhode Island 6, Missouri 3 =====
August 22 8:00 pm EDT Howard J. Lamade Stadium
Team	1	2	3	4	5	6	R	H	E
Rhode Island ◄	5	0	0	1	0	0	6	11	0
Missouri	2	0	0	0	1	0	3	6	0
WP: Cam Adamec (1–0) LP: Cale McCallister (0–1) Sv: Jared Olson (1); Home runs: RI: None; MO: Devrin Weathers (1), Cale McCallister (1); Notes: Missouri is eliminated. Boxscore

===== Game 18: Kentucky 4, South Carolina 3 =====
August 24 4:00 pm EDT Howard J. Lamade Stadium
Team	1	2	3	4	5	6	R	H	E
South Carolina	0	2	0	1	0	0	3	4	1
Kentucky ◄	3	0	0	0	1	X	4	6	0
WP: Ty Bryant (1–0) LP: Terrence Gist (0–1) Sv: Eli Burwash (1); Home runs: SC: Braden Golinski (1); KY: Eli Burwash (1); Notes: South Carolina is eliminated. Boxscore

===== Game 20: California 10, Rhode Island 3 =====
August 24 8:00 pm EDT Howard J. Lamade Stadium
Team	1	2	3	4	5	6	R	H	E
California ◄	0	0	6	0	0	4	10	14	4
Rhode Island	2	0	1	0	0	0	3	4	4
WP: Levi Mendez (1–0) LP: Dylan Demers (0–2); Home runs: CA: Jacob Baptista (1), Walker Lannom (2), Dante Schmid (3); RI: Caleb Harris (1), David Marchetti (1); Notes: Rhode Island is eliminated. Boxscore

===== Game 22: California 11, Kentucky 3 =====
August 25 8:00 pm EDT Howard J. Lamade Stadium
Team	1	2	3	4	5	6	R	H	E
California ◄	3	2	0	0	2	4	11	8	0
Kentucky	0	0	0	2	1	0	3	6	4
WP: Dante Schmid (2–0) LP: Eli Burwash (0–2); Home runs: CA: Antonio Andrade (2), Levi Mendez (2); KY: Carson Kelley (2); Boxscore

===== Game 26: Texas 9, California 7 =====
August 27 8:00 pm EDT Howard J. Lamade Stadium
Team	1	2	3	4	5	6	7	8	R	H	E
California	3	0	3	0	0	0	0	1	7	5	0
Texas ◄	4	0	0	1	1	0	0	3	9	12	1
WP: Isaac Garcia (1–0) LP: Jacob Baptista (0–1); Home runs: CA: Jacob Baptista (2), Walker Lannom (3), Levi Mendez (3); TX: Marco Gutierrez (1), Caleb Low (1), Zack Mack (1), Ben Gottfried (2); Boxscore

=== International ===
Upper round 1	Upper round 2	Upper final	Final
August 21 – Game 1
Uganda	4
August 23 – Game 13
Dominican Republic	1
Uganda	0
August 21 – Game 3
Venezuela	7
Venezuela	5
August 26 – Game 23 (F/8)
Australia	2
Venezuela	4
August 21 – Game 5
Japan	5
Canada	0
August 23 – Game 15
Mexico	1
Mexico	1
August 21 – Game 7
Japan	3
Japan	7	August 29 – Intl. championship (F/7)
Chinese Taipei	5	Japan	1
Mexico	0
Lower round 1	Lower round 2	Lower round 3	Lower final
August 24 – Game 17 (F/4)
August 22 – Game 9	Mexico	14	August 27 – Game 25
Australia	3	Australia	3	August 25 – Game 21 (F/5)	Venezuela	0
Dominican Republic	0	Mexico	11	Mexico	11
August 24 – Game 19	Chinese Taipei	1
August 22 – Game 11 (F/4)	Uganda	0
Chinese Taipei	16	Chinese Taipei	5
Canada	4

==== Winner's bracket ====
===== Game 1: Uganda 4, Dominican Republic 1 =====
August 21 10:00 am EDT Volunteer Stadium
Team	1	2	3	4	5	6	R	H	E
Uganda ◄	1	0	3	0	0	0	4	3	2
Dominican Republic	0	0	1	0	0	0	1	3	1
WP: Francis Alemo (1–0) LP: Yaniel Arias (0–1) Sv: Jovan Edaku (1); Home runs: UGA: None; DOM: None; Boxscore

===== Game 3: Venezuela 5, Australia 2 =====
August 21 1:00 pm EDT Volunteer Stadium
Team	1	2	3	4	5	6	R	H	E
Venezuela ◄	0	0	2	0	0	3	5	7	0
Australia	1	0	0	1	0	0	2	2	1
WP: Yeiner Fernandez (1–0) LP: Jake Burns (0–1); Home runs: VEN: Yeiner Fernandez (1); AUS: Jake Burns (1); Boxscore

===== Game 5: Mexico 1, Canada 0 =====
August 21 4:00 pm EDT Volunteer Stadium
Team	1	2	3	4	5	6	R	H	E
Canada	0	0	0	0	0	0	0	3	0
Mexico ◄	0	0	0	0	0	1	1	4	0
WP: Gerardo Lujano (1–0) LP: Alen Sugimoto (0–1); Home runs: CAN: None; MEX: None; Boxscore

===== Game 7: Japan 7, Chinese Taipei 5 =====
August 21 7:00 pm EDT Volunteer Stadium
Team	1	2	3	4	5	6	R	H	E
Chinese Taipei	0	0	2	0	1	2	5	8	0
Japan ◄	2	4	0	1	0	X	7	9	1
WP: Kabu Kikuchi (1–0) LP: Wei Hung Chou (0–1) Sv: Daiki Fukuyama (1); Home runs: TPE: Yen Cheng Yu (1); JPN: Shingo Tomita (1), Kengo Tomita 2 (2); Boxscore

===== Game 13: Venezuela 7, Uganda 0 =====
August 23 11:00 am EDT Volunteer Stadium
Team	1	2	3	4	5	6	R	H	E
Venezuela ◄	4	0	0	0	3	0	7	11	0
Uganda	0	0	0	0	0	0	0	1	0
WP: Luis Castillo (1–0) LP: Joshua Olara (0–1); Home runs: VEN: Luis Castillo (1), Joel Flores (1); UGA: None; Boxscore

===== Game 15: Japan 3, Mexico 1 =====
August 23 5:00 pm EDT Volunteer Stadium
Team	1	2	3	4	5	6	R	H	E
Mexico	0	0	0	0	0	1	1	4	0
Japan ◄	2	0	0	0	1	X	3	4	0
WP: Nobuyuki Kawashima (1–0) LP: Jose Reyes (0–1) Sv: Daiki Fukuyama (2); Home runs: MEX: Gerardo Lujano (1); JPN: Fukutaro Kiyomiya (1); Boxscore

===== Game 23: Japan 5, Venezuela 4 =====
August 26 4:00 pm EDT Howard J. Lamade Stadium
Team	1	2	3	4	5	6	7	8	R	H	E
Venezuela	0	0	1	1	0	0	0	2	4	9	1
Japan ◄	0	0	1	0	0	1	0	3	5	12	1
WP: Shingo Tomita (1–0) LP: Johan Garcia (0-1); Home runs: VEN: Yeiner Fernandez (2), Jeferson Quero (1); JPN: Shingo Tomita (2); Boxscore

==== Loser's bracket ====
===== Game 9: Australia 3, Dominican Republic 0 =====
August 22 1:00 pm EDT Volunteer Stadium
Team	1	2	3	4	5	6	R	H	E
Australia ◄	1	0	0	0	0	2	3	5	1
Dominican Republic	0	0	0	0	0	0	0	1	1
WP: Jake Burns (1–1) LP: Emmanuel Rodriguez (0–1) Sv: Luke Krkovski (1); Home runs: AUS: Jake Burns (2), Blake Cavill (1); DOM: None; Notes: Dominican Republic is eliminated. Boxscore

===== Game 11: Chinese Taipei 16, Canada 4 =====
August 22 6:00 pm EDT Volunteer Stadium
Team	1	2	3	4	5	6	R	H	E
Chinese Taipei ◄	9	0	4	3	–	–	16	14	0
Canada	2	1	0	1	–	–	4	5	3
WP: Cheng Yu Yang (1–0) LP: Darius Opdam-Bak (0–1); Home runs: TPE: Hao En Chen (1), Yen Cheng Yu (2), Wei Hung Chou 2 (2); CAN: None; Notes: Completed early due to mercy rule. Canada is eliminated. Boxscore

===== Game 17: Mexico 14, Australia 3 =====
August 24 2:00 pm EDT Volunteer Stadium
Team	1	2	3	4	5	6	R	H	E
Mexico ◄	9	2	2	1	–	–	14	11	1
Australia	2	1	0	0	–	–	3	6	2
WP: Hector Sanchez (1–0) LP: Luke Krkovski (0–1); Home runs: MEX: Jorge Armenta (1), Alberto Bustos (1), Damian Garcia (1); AUS: None; Notes: Completed early due to mercy rule. Australia is eliminated. Boxscore

===== Game 19: Chinese Taipei 5, Uganda 0 =====
August 24 6:00 pm EDT Volunteer Stadium
Team	1	2	3	4	5	6	R	H	E
Chinese Taipei ◄	3	0	0	0	2	0	5	6	0
Uganda	0	0	0	0	0	0	0	1	3
WP: Wei Hung Chou (1–1) LP: Pius Echoni (0–1); Home runs: TPE: None; UGA: None; Notes: Uganda is eliminated. Boxscore

===== Game 21: Mexico 11, Chinese Taipei 1 =====
August 25 4:00 pm EDT Howard J. Lamade Stadium
Team	1	2	3	4	5	6	R	H	E
Chinese Taipei	0	1	0	0	0	–	1	6	2
Mexico ◄	3	4	1	0	3	–	11	9	0
WP: Armando Verdugo (1–0) LP: Yen Cheng Yu (0–1); Home runs: TPE: None; MEX: Raul Leon (1), Ernesto Rios (1), Andres Villa (1); Notes: Completed early due to mercy rule. Chinese Taipei is eliminated. Boxscore

===== Game 25: Mexico 11, Venezuela 0 =====
August 27 4:00 pm EDT Howard J. Lamade Stadium
Team	1	2	3	4	5	6	R	H	E
Mexico ◄	0	3	3	0	2	3	11	10	0
Venezuela	0	0	0	0	0	0	0	3	3
WP: Daniel Zaragoza (1–0) LP: Adrian Alvarez (0–1); Home runs: MEX: Alberto Bustos (2), Raul Leon (2); VEN: None; Notes: Venezuela is eliminated. Boxscore

=== Crossover games ===
==== Game A: Dominican Republic 7, Oregon 3 ====
August 24 Noon EDT Howard J. Lamade Stadium
Team	1	2	3	4	5	6	R	H	E
Oregon	0	1	0	2	0	0	3	9	0
Dominican Republic ◄	1	4	0	1	1	X	7	11	2
WP: Jose Marte (1–0) LP: Jackson Farr (0–1); Home runs: OR: Nolan Miga (1); DOM: Emmanuel Rodriguez 2 (2); Boxscore

==== Game B: Missouri 18, Canada 6 ====
August 25 Noon EDT Howard J. Lamade Stadium
Team	1	2	3	4	5	6	R	H	E
Missouri ◄	0	0	5	0	4	9	18	11	1
Canada	1	0	1	0	2	2	6	6	5
WP: Devrin Weathers (1–1) LP: Alen Sugimoto (0–2); Home runs: MO: Devrin Weathers (2), Jaystin Smith (1); CAN: None; Boxscore

== Single-elimination stage ==
=== International Championship: Japan 1, Mexico 0 ===
August 29 12:30 pm EDT Howard J. Lamade Stadium
Team	1	2	3	4	5	6	7	R	H	E
Mexico	0	0	0	0	0	0	0	0	4	1
Japan ◄	0	0	0	0	0	0	1	1	2	0
WP: Kabu Kikuchi (2–0) LP: Armando Verdugo (1–1); Home runs: MEX: None; JPN: None; Notes: Armando Verdugo had a no-hitter through 6 innings. Mexico is eliminated. Boxscore

=== United States Championship: Pennsylvania 3, Texas 2 ===
August 29 3:30 pm EDT Howard J. Lamade Stadium
Team	1	2	3	4	5	6	R	H	E
Texas	0	1	0	1	0	0	2	3	0
Pennsylvania ◄	1	0	0	1	0	1	3	4	1
WP: Jaden Henline (3–0) LP: Ryan Farmer (0–1); Home runs: TX: None; PA: Jaden Henline (1), Cole Wagner (4); Notes: Texas is eliminated. Boxscore

=== Third-place game: Texas 6, Mexico 4 ===
August 30 10:00 am EDT Howard J. Lamade Stadium
Team	1	2	3	4	5	6	R	H	E
Texas ◄	0	0	3	0	0	3	6	4	2
Mexico	2	0	1	1	0	0	4	7	1
WP: Jarrett Tadlock (2–1) LP: Gerardo Lujano (1–1); Home runs: TX: Isaac Garcia (2), Raffi Gross (2); MEX: Raul Leon 2 (4), Gerardo Lujano (2); Boxscore

=== World Championship Game: Japan 18, Pennsylvania 11 ===
August 30 3:00 pm EDT Howard J. Lamade Stadium
Team	1	2	3	4	5	6	R	H	E
Japan ◄	2	7	4	0	0	5	18	22	3
Pennsylvania	10	0	1	0	0	0	11	8	3
WP: Nobuyuki Kawashima (2–0) LP: Jaden Henline (3–1); Home runs: JPN: Yugo Aoki (1), Kengo Tomita (3), Shingo Tomita 2 (4), Masafuji Nishijima (1); PA: Dylan Rodenhaber (1), Jaden Henline (2); Boxscore
