= 2012 Little League World Series results =

Children's baseball competition results

The results of the 2012 Little League World Series were determined between August 16 and August 26, 2012 in South Williamsport, Pennsylvania. 16 teams were divided into two groups, one with eight teams from the United States and another with eight international teams, with both groups playing a modified double-elimination tournament. In each group, the last remaining undefeated team faced the last remaining team with one loss, with the winners of those games advancing to play for the Little League World Series championship. All times shown are US EDT.

United States
United States	Winner's bracket						
United States	(California) CA 6◄ (Connecticut) CT 4 Linescore	(Tennessee) TN 12◄ (Nebraska) NE 1 Linescore	(New Jersey) NJ 2 (Texas) TX 5◄ Linescore	(Oregon) OR 0 (Indiana) IN 4◄ Linescore	(Tennessee) TN 9◄ (California) CA 6 Linescore	(Texas) TX 13◄ (Indiana) IN 3 Linescore	(Tennessee) TN 4◄ (Texas) TX 3 Linescore
United States	Loser's bracket						
United States	(Connecticut) CT 12◄ (Nebraska) NE 0 (F/5); Linescore	(New Jersey) NJ 10◄ (Oregon) OR 4 Linescore	(New Jersey) NJ 4 (F/8) (California) CA 5◄ Linescore	(Indiana) IN 0 (Connecticut) CT 4◄ Linescore	(Connecticut) CT 0 (California) CA 5◄ Linescore	(Texas) TX 1 (F/5) (California) CA 11◄ Linescore	
International
International	Winner's bracket						
International	(Curaçao) CUR 0 (Japan) JPN 7◄ Linescore	(Chinese Taipei) TPE 14◄ (Germany) GER 1 (F/4); Linescore	(Canada) CAN 13◄ (Mexico) MEX 9 Linescore	(Uganda) UGA 3 (Panama) PAN 9◄ Linescore	(Canada) CAN 3 (Panama) PAN 8◄ Linescore	(Chinese Taipei) TPE 0 (F/9) (Japan) JPN 2◄ Linescore	(Panama) PAN 1 (Japan) JPN 4◄ Linescore
International	Loser's bracket						
International	(Curaçao) CUR 14◄ (Germany) GER 2 (F/4); Linescore	(Mexico) MEX 12◄ (Uganda) UGA 0 (F/4); Linescore	(Curaçao) CUR 4◄ (Canada) CAN 3 Linescore	(Chinese Taipei) TPE 3 (Mexico) MEX 4◄ Linescore	(Mexico) MEX 6◄ (Curaçao) CUR 2 Linescore	(Panama) PAN 2◄ (Mexico) MEX 1 Linescore	
Crossover games	Nebraska 17◄ Germany 1 (F/4); Linescore				Oregon 2 Uganda 3◄ Linescore		
Single-Elimination
International Championship	Japan 10◄ Panama 2 Linescore						
United States Championship	Tennessee 24◄ California 16 (F/7); Linescore						
Consolation Game	Panama 4 California 12◄ Linescore						
World Championship Game	Tennessee 2 (F/5); Japan 12◄ Linescore						

== Double-elimination stage ==
=== United States ===
Upper round 1	Upper round 2	Upper final	Final
August 16 – Game 2
Indiana	4
August 19 – Game 15
Oregon	0
Indiana	3
August 16 – Game 4
Texas	13
New Jersey	2
August 22 – Game 24
Texas	5
Texas	3
August 17 – Game 6
Tennessee	4
California	6
August 19 – Game 14
Connecticut	4
California	6
August 17 – Game 8
Tennessee	9
Nebraska	1	August 25 – U.S. championship (F/7)
Tennessee	12	Tennessee	24
California	16
Lower round 1	Lower round 2	Lower round 3	Lower final
August 20 – Game 18 (F/8)
August 18 – Game 10	California	5	August 24 – Game 26 (F/5)
Oregon	4	New Jersey	4	August 21 – Game 22	Texas	1
New Jersey	10	California	5	California	11
August 20 – Game 20	Connecticut	0
August 18 – Game 12 (F/5)	Indiana	0
Connecticut	12	Connecticut	4
Nebraska	0

==== Winner's bracket ====
===== Game 2: California 6, Connecticut 4 =====
August 16 3:00 pm EDT Howard J. Lamade Stadium
Team	1	2	3	4	5	6	R	H	E
California ◄	1	0	2	0	2	1	6	7	3
Connecticut	1	0	0	1	2	0	4	6	1
WP: Bradley Smith (1–0) LP: Ryan Meury (0–1) Sv: Andrew White (1); Home runs: CA: Bradley Smith (1); CT: Biagio Paoletta (1); Attendance: 9,730; Boxscore

===== Game 4: Tennessee 12, Nebraska 1 =====
August 16 8:00 pm EDT Howard J. Lamade Stadium
Team	1	2	3	4	5	6	R	H	E
Tennessee ◄	1	2	0	0	2	7	12	13	0
Nebraska	0	0	0	0	0	1	1	2	1
WP: Brock Myers (1–0) LP: Blake Quintana (0–1) Sv: None; Home runs: TN: Jake Rucker (1), Jayson Brown (1), Brock Myers (1), Ryan Lyle (1); NE: None; Boxscore

===== Game 6: Texas 5, New Jersey 2 =====
August 17 3:00 pm EDT Howard J. Lamade Stadium
Team	1	2	3	4	5	6	R	H	E
New Jersey	0	0	0	2	0	0	2	5	3
Texas ◄	1	3	0	0	1	X	5	5	0
WP: Tyler Vitt (1–0) LP: Emil Matti (0–1) Sv: None; Home runs: NJ: None; TX: Jordan Cardenas (1); Attendance: 11,100; Boxscore

===== Game 8: Indiana 4, Oregon 0 =====
August 17 8:00 pm EDT Howard J. Lamade Stadium
Team	1	2	3	4	5	6	R	H	E
Oregon	0	0	0	0	0	0	0	2	1
Indiana ◄	0	0	0	0	4	X	4	6	0
WP: Niah Williamson (1–0) LP: Greg Mehlhaff (0–1) Sv: None; Home runs: OR: None; IN: None; Attendance: 13,200; Boxscore

===== Game 14: Tennessee 9, California 6 =====
August 19 2:00 pm EDT Howard J. Lamade Stadium
Team	1	2	3	4	5	6	R	H	E
Tennessee ◄	2	2	0	1	0	4	9	9	1
California	3	0	0	1	1	1	6	9	0
WP: Jake Rucker (1–0) LP: Andrew White (0–1) Sv: None; Home runs: TN: Brock Myers (2); CA: Porter Slate (1), Bradley Smith (2), Kempton Brandis (1), Cole Tomei (1); Attendance: 17,360; Boxscore

===== Game 15: Texas 13, Indiana 3 =====
August 19 5:00 pm EDT Volunteer Stadium
Team	1	2	3	4	5	6	R	H	E
Texas ◄	3	0	0	6	2	2	13	14	0
Indiana	2	0	0	0	0	1	3	4	1
WP: Seth Morrow (1–0) LP: Bryce Huntley (0–1) Sv: None; Home runs: TX: Jordan Cardenas (2), Zachary Sanchez (1); IN: Hunter McCubbins (1); Attendance: 8,900; Boxscore

===== Game 24: Tennessee 4, Texas 3 =====
August 22 8:00 pm EDT Howard J. Lamade Stadium
Team	1	2	3	4	5	6	R	H	E
Tennessee ◄	0	0	2	0	0	2	4	10	0
Texas	1	0	0	0	2	0	3	7	1
WP: Ryan Lyle (1–0) LP: Zachary Sanchez (0–1) Sv: Luke Brown (1); Home runs: TN: Jayson Brown (2), Brock Myers (3); TX: None; Attendance: 14,400; Boxscore

==== Loser's bracket ====
===== Game 10: Connecticut 12, Nebraska 0 =====
August 18 3:00 pm EDT Howard J. Lamade Stadium
Team	1	2	3	4	5	6	R	H	E
Connecticut ◄	0	0	3	6	3	–	12	8	1
Nebraska	0	0	0	0	0	–	0	2	0
WP: Matt Kubel (1–0) LP: Matt Masker (0–1) Sv: None; Home runs: CT: Will Lucas (1); NE: None; Attendance: 16,390; Notes: Completed early due to mercy rule. Nebraska is eliminated. Boxscore

===== Game 12: New Jersey 10, Oregon 4 =====
August 18 8:00 pm EDT Howard J. Lamade Stadium
Team	1	2	3	4	5	6	R	H	E
New Jersey ◄	2	3	0	1	4	0	10	13	1
Oregon	0	2	2	0	0	0	4	7	2
WP: Bener Uygun (1–0) LP: Hunter Hemenway (0–1) Sv: None; Home runs: NJ: Emil Matti 2 (2), D. J. Pico (1); OR: None; Attendance: 15,100; Notes: Oregon is eliminated. Boxscore

===== Game 18: California 5, New Jersey 4 =====
August 20 4:00 pm EDT Howard J. Lamade Stadium
Team	1	2	3	4	5	6	7	8	R	H	E
New Jersey	0	1	0	1	0	2	0	0	4	8	2
California ◄	0	0	0	3	1	0	0	1	5	7	1
WP: Logan Douglas (1–0) LP: David Ton (0–1) Sv: None; Home runs: NJ: Emil Matti (3), Anthony Scannelli (1); CA: Danny Marzo (1); Attendance: 8,600; Notes: New Jersey is eliminated. Boxscore

===== Game 20: Connecticut 4, Indiana 0 =====
August 20 8:00 pm EDT Howard J. Lamade Stadium
Team	1	2	3	4	5	6	R	H	E
Indiana	0	0	0	0	0	0	0	0	0
Connecticut ◄	0	2	0	0	2	X	4	5	0
WP: Will Lucas (1–0) LP: Janson Anderson (0–1) Sv: None; Home runs: IN: None; CT: Matt Kubel (1); Attendance: 7,400; Notes: Indiana is eliminated. Boxscore

===== Game 22: California 5, Connecticut 0 =====
August 21 8:00 pm EDT Howard J. Lamade Stadium
Team	1	2	3	4	5	6	R	H	E
Connecticut	0	0	0	0	0	0	0	3	2
California ◄	0	1	3	0	1	X	5	7	1
WP: Quinton Gago (1–0) LP: Matt Kubel (1–1) Sv: None; Home runs: CT: None; CA: Hance Smith (1); Attendance: 11,400; Notes: Connecticut is eliminated. Boxscore

===== Game 26: California 11, Texas 1 =====
August 23 8:00 pm EDT Howard J. Lamade Stadium
Team	1	2	3	4	5	6	R	H	E
Texas	0	0	1	0	0	–	1	2	0
California ◄	6	0	1	0	4	–	11	12	0
WP: Danny Marzo (1–0) LP: Seth Morrow (1–1) Sv: None; Home runs: TX: Jordan Cardenas (3); CA: Hance Smith 2 (3), Quinton Gago (1); Attendance: 15,100; Notes: Completed early due to mercy rule. Texas is eliminated. Boxscore

=== International ===
Upper round 1	Upper round 2	Upper final	Final
August 16 – Game 1
Japan	7
August 19 – Game 16 (F/9)
Curaçao	0
Japan	2
August 16 – Game 3 (F/4)
Chinese Taipei	0
Germany	1
August 22 – Game 23
Chinese Taipei	14
Japan	4
August 17 – Game 5
Panama	1
Mexico	9
August 19 – Game 13
Canada	13
Canada	3
August 17 – Game 7
Panama	8
Panama	9	August 25 – Intl. championship
Uganda	3	Japan	10
Panama	2
Lower round 1	Lower round 2	Lower round 3	Lower final
August 20 – Game 17
August 18 – Game 9 (F/4)	Canada	3	August 23 – Game 25
Curaçao	14	Curaçao	4	August 21 – Game 21	Panama	2
Germany	2	Curaçao	2	Mexico	1
August 20 – Game 19	Mexico	6
August 18 – Game 11 (F/4)	Chinese Taipei	3
Mexico	12	Mexico	4
Uganda	0

==== Winner's bracket ====
===== Game 1: Japan 7, Curaçao 0 =====
August 16 1:00 pm EDT Volunteer Stadium
Team	1	2	3	4	5	6	R	H	E
Curaçao	0	0	0	0	0	0	0	2	1
Japan ◄	3	3	0	0	1	X	7	10	1
WP: Kotaro Kiyomiya (1–0) LP: Christopher Koeiman (0–1) Sv: None; Home runs: CUR: None; JPN: None; Attendance: 6,120; Boxscore

===== Game 3: Chinese Taipei 14, Germany 1 =====
August 16 5:00 pm EDT Volunteer Stadium
Team	1	2	3	4	5	6	R	H	E
Chinese Taipei ◄	0	3	6	5	–	–	14	11	2
Germany	0	0	0	1	–	–	1	1	2
WP: Chun-En Lin (1–0) LP: Justin Wilson (0–1) Sv: None; Home runs: TPE: Li-Wei Chiang (1); GER: None; Attendance: 4,895; Notes: Completed early due to mercy rule. Boxscore

===== Game 5: Canada 13, Mexico 9 =====
August 17 1:00 pm EDT Volunteer Stadium
Team	1	2	3	4	5	6	R	H	E
Canada ◄	7	1	2	1	0	2	13	13	1
Mexico	1	7	0	1	0	0	9	14	1
WP: Ataru Yamaguchi (1–0) LP: Andres Carrillo (0–1) Sv: None; Home runs: CAN: None; MEX: Eduardo Abrego (1), Ramon Ballina 2 (2), Gerardo Moreno (1); Attendance: 7,105; Boxscore

===== Game 7: Panama 9, Uganda 3 =====
August 17 5:00 pm EDT Volunteer Stadium
Team	1	2	3	4	5	6	R	H	E
Uganda	0	0	1	0	0	2	3	3	4
Panama ◄	0	5	2	1	1	X	9	12	1
WP: Julio Goff (1–0) LP: Job Echon (0–1) Sv: None; Home runs: UGA: Daniel Alio (1); PAN: None; Attendance: 7,280; Notes: The start of the game was delayed 22 minutes due to rain. Boxscore

===== Game 13: Panama 8, Canada 3 =====
August 19 Noon EDT Volunteer Stadium
Team	1	2	3	4	5	6	R	H	E
Canada	0	0	0	1	1	1	3	3	0
Panama ◄	0	6	0	2	0	X	8	12	1
WP: Edisson Gonzalez (1–0) LP: Steven Moretto (0–1) Sv: None; Home runs: CAN: None; PAN: James Gonzalez 2 (2), Carlos Flavio (1); Attendance: 6,150; Boxscore

===== Game 16: Japan 2, Chinese Taipei 0 =====
August 19 8:00 pm EDT Howard J. Lamade Stadium
Team	1	2	3	4	5	6	7	8	9	R	H	E
Chinese Taipei	0	0	0	0	0	0	0	0	0	0	4	1
Japan ◄	0	0	0	0	0	0	0	0	2	2	5	0
WP: Noriatsu Osaka (1–0) LP: Cheng-Kai Hu (0–1) Sv: None; Home runs: TPE: None; JPN: Hajime Motegi (1); Attendance: 16,250; Boxscore

===== Game 23: Japan 4, Panama 1 =====
August 22 4:00 pm EDT Howard J. Lamade Stadium
Team	1	2	3	4	5	6	R	H	E
Panama	0	0	0	0	1	0	1	4	0
Japan ◄	3	0	0	0	1	X	4	8	1
WP: Ryuji Osada (1–0) LP: Julio Goff (1–1) Sv: Noriatsu Osaka (1); Home runs: PAN: None; JPN: Kotaro Kiyomiya (1), Shun Oshima (1); Attendance: 13,145; Boxscore

==== Loser's bracket ====
===== Game 9: Curaçao 14, Germany 2 =====
August 18 Noon EDT Volunteer Stadium
Team	1	2	3	4	5	6	R	H	E
Curaçao ◄	8	0	5	1	–	–	14	12	1
Germany	0	0	2	0	–	–	2	4	6
WP: Arjun Huerta (1–0) LP: Jared Mendiola (0–1) Sv: None; Home runs: CUR: Christopher Koeiman (1); GER: None; Attendance: 5,480; Notes: Completed early due to mercy rule. Germany is eliminated. Boxscore

===== Game 11: Mexico 12, MEA 0 =====
August 18 6:00 pm EDT Volunteer Stadium
Team	1	2	3	4	5	6	R	H	E
Mexico ◄	0	5	7	0	–	–	12	13	0
Uganda	0	0	0	0	–	–	0	0	2
WP: Felix Diaz (1–0) LP: Felix Enzama (0–1) Sv: None; Home runs: MEX: Joel Turrubiates (1), Andres Carrillo 2 (2), Felix Diaz (1); UGA: None; Attendance: 6,735; Notes: Completed early due to mercy rule. Uganda is eliminated. Boxscore

===== Game 17: Curaçao 4, Canada 3 =====
August 20 2:00 pm EDT Volunteer Stadium
Team	1	2	3	4	5	6	R	H	E
Curaçao ◄	0	1	0	0	3	0	4	3	0
Canada	0	0	1	2	0	0	3	7	2
WP: Railison Bentura (1–0) LP: Cole Dalla-Zanna (0–1) Sv: None; Home runs: CUR: Mychellon Jansen (1), Mildward Baranco (1); CAN: Noah Hanson-Stafford (1); Attendance: 4,875; Notes: The start of the game was delayed for 5 minutes due to rain. The game was further delayed in the bottom of the 1st for 18 minutes due to rain. Canada is eliminated. Boxscore

===== Game 19: Mexico 4, Chinese Taipei 3 =====
August 20 6:00 pm EDT Volunteer Stadium
Team	1	2	3	4	5	6	R	H	E
Chinese Taipei	1	1	0	1	0	0	3	7	2
Mexico ◄	1	0	3	0	0	X	4	4	2
WP: Felix Diaz (2–0) LP: Cheng-Feng Lee (0–1) Sv: Ramon Ballina (1); Home runs: TPE: Chun-En Lin (1); MEX: Omar Cervantes (1); Attendance: 5,880; Notes: Chinese Taipei is eliminated. Boxscore

===== Game 21: Mexico 6, Curaçao 2 =====
August 21 4:00 pm EDT Howard J. Lamade Stadium
Team	1	2	3	4	5	6	R	H	E
Mexico ◄	0	0	5	0	0	1	6	8	1
Curaçao	1	0	1	0	0	0	2	6	2
WP: Andres Carrillo (1–1) LP: Christopher Koeiman (0–2) Sv: Ramon Ballina (2); Home runs: MEX: Ramon Ballina (3), Eduardo Abrego (2); CUR: None; Attendance: 12,150; Notes: Caribbean is eliminated. Boxscore

===== Game 25: Panama 2, Mexico 1 =====
August 23 4:00 pm EDT Howard J. Lamade Stadium
Team	1	2	3	4	5	6	R	H	E
Panama ◄	2	0	0	0	0	0	2	5	1
Mexico	0	0	0	0	1	0	1	5	0
WP: Edisson Gonzalez (2–0) LP: Ramon Ballina (0–1) Sv: None; Home runs: PAN: James Gonzalez (3); MEX: None; Attendance: 12,950; Notes: Mexico is eliminated. Boxscore

=== Crossover games ===
==== Game A: Nebraska 17, Germany 1 ====
August 20 Noon EDT Howard J. Lamade Stadium
Team	1	2	3	4	5	6	R	H	E
Nebraska ◄	2	15	0	0	–	–	17	12	0
Germany	0	0	1	0	–	–	1	2	4
WP: Blake Quintana (1–1) LP: Justin Wilson (0–2) Sv: None; Home runs: NE: Jared Wegner (1); GER: None; Attendance: 4,600; Notes: Completed early due to mercy rule. The game was delayed in the top of the 2nd due to rain. Boxscore

==== Game B: Uganda 3, Oregon 2 ====
August 21 1:00 pm EDT Howard J. Lamade Stadium
Team	1	2	3	4	5	6	R	H	E
Oregon	0	0	0	2	0	0	2	7	1
Uganda ◄	0	0	0	2	1	X	3	7	0
WP: Daniel Alio (1–0) LP: Greg Mehlhaff (0–2) Sv: Job Echon (1); Home runs: OR: None; UGA: None; Attendance: 9,800; Notes: This was the first win by a team from Africa at the Little League World Series. Boxscore

== Single-elimination stage ==
=== International Championship: Japan 10, Panama 2 ===
August 25 12:30 pm EDT Howard J. Lamade Stadium
Team	1	2	3	4	5	6	R	H	E
Japan ◄	2	2	1	2	3	0	10	9	0
Panama	1	1	0	0	0	0	2	6	4
WP: Yuta Ishida (1–0) LP: James Gonzalez (0–1) Sv: None; Home runs: JPN: Noriatsu Osaka (1), Kotaro Kiyomiya 2 (3), Satoru Aoyama (1), Rintaro Hirano (1); PAN: None; Attendance: 19,850; Notes: Panama is eliminated. Boxscore

=== United States Championship: Tennessee 24, California 16 ===
August 25 3:30 pm EDT Howard J. Lamade Stadium
Team	1	2	3	4	5	6	7	R	H	E
Tennessee ◄	2	0	6	4	0	3	9	24	21	3
California	1	0	4	0	0	10	1	16	14	2
WP: Luke Brown (1–0) LP: Dylan Moore (0–1) Sv: None; Home runs: TN: Jayson Brown (3), Brock Myers (4), Lorenzo Butler 3 (3); CA: Kempton Brandis (2), Hance Smith (4); Attendance: 24,175; Notes: California is eliminated. The two teams set a Little League World Series record with 40 combined runs. Lorenzo Butler set a Little League World Series record with 9 RBI. Boxscore

=== Consolation Game ===
August 26 11:00 am EDT Howard J. Lamade Stadium
Team	1	2	3	4	5	6	R	H	E
Panama	1	1	1	0	0	1	4	9	0
California ◄	4	4	0	1	3	X	12	8	1
WP: Logan Douglas (2–0) LP: Julio Goff (1–2) Sv: None; Home runs: PAN: Edisson Gonzalez (1); CA: None; Attendance: 8,575; Boxscore

=== World Championship Game ===
August 26 3:00 pm EDT Howard J. Lamade Stadium
Team	1	2	3	4	5	6	R	H	E
Tennessee	0	0	0	1	1	–	2	2	0
Japan	2	1	2	5	2	–	12	11	0
WP: Kotaro Kiyomiya (2–0) LP: Justin Smith (0–1) Sv: None; Home runs: TN: Brock Myers (5), Lorenzo Butler (4); JPN: Noriatsu Osaka 3 (4), Yuta Ishida (1), Tatsuya Irie (1); Notes: Completed early due to mercy rule. Japan wins the Little League World Series. Boxscore
