= 2007 Little League World Series results =

Children's baseball competition results

The results of the 2007 Little League World Series were determined between August 17 and August 26, 2007, in South Williamsport, Pennsylvania. 16 teams were divided into four groups, two with four teams from the United States and two with four international teams each, playing in a round robin format. In each group, the top two teams advanced to the knockout stage. The last remaining team from the United States faced the last remaining international team for the Little League World Series Championship.

Pool play
Pool A	(Ohio) OH 2 (Massachusetts) MA 3◄ Linescore	(Georgia (U.S. state)) GA 9◄ (Oregon) OR 4 Linescore	(Ohio) OH 10◄ (Georgia (U.S. state)) GA 2 Linescore	(Oregon) OR 1◄ (Massachusetts) MA 0 Linescore	(Ohio) OH 1 (Oregon) OR 6◄ Linescore	(Massachusetts) MA 1 (Georgia (U.S. state)) GA 8◄ Linescore
Pool B	(Maryland) MD 6 (Arizona) AZ 16◄ Linescore	(Texas) TX 6◄ (Minnesota) MN 0 Linescore	(Arizona) AZ 1 (Texas) TX 5◄ Linescore	(Maryland) MD 3 (Minnesota) MN 4◄ Linescore	(Texas) TX (Maryland) MD; Canceled	(Arizona) AZ 9◄ (Minnesota) MN 2 linescore
Pool C	(Curaçao) CUR 3 (Japan) JPN 10◄ Linescore	(Saudi Arabia) SAU 5 (Canada) CAN 13◄ Linescore	(Saudi Arabia) SAU 0 (Curaçao) CUR 2◄ Linescore	(Canada) CAN 1 (Japan) JPN 7◄ Linescore	(Japan) JPN (Saudi Arabia) TRA; Canceled	(Curaçao) CUR 6◄ (Canada) CAN 2 Linescore
Pool D	(Venezuela) VEN 2◄ (Taiwan) TWN 1 Linescore	(Mexico) MEX 11◄ (Netherlands) NED 1 (F/4); Linescore	(Netherlands) NED 1 (F/5) (Taiwan) TWN 11◄ Linescore	(Netherlands) NED 2 (F/4) (Venezuela) VEN 21◄ Linescore	(Taiwan) TWN 4◄ (Mexico) MEX 2 Linescore	(Venezuela) VEN 11◄ (Mexico) MEX 1 Linescore
Elimination round
Semifinals	Oregon 2 Texas 8◄ Linescore			Arizona 6 (F/5) (Georgia (U.S. state)) Georgia 16◄ Linescore		
Semifinals	Venezuela 2 (F/7); Curaçao 4◄ Linescore			Taiwan 3 (F/10); Japan 4◄ Linescore		
Finals	Curaçao 4 Japan 7◄ Linescore			Texas 2 (Georgia (U.S. state)) Georgia 5◄ Linescore		
Consolation Game	Curaçao 0 Texas 1◄ Linescore					
Championship Game	Japan 2 (F/8) (Georgia (U.S. state)) Georgia 3◄ Linescore					

== Pool play ==
=== Pool A ===
Pool A
Rank	Region	Record	Runs Allowed	Run Ratio
1	(Georgia (U.S. state)) Georgia	2–1	15	0.882
2	Oregon	2–1	10	0.588
3	Massachusetts	1–2	11	0.647
4	Ohio	1–2	11	0.647

==== Massachusetts 3, Ohio 2 ====
August 17 2:00 pm EDT Little League Volunteer Stadium
Team	1	2	3	4	5	6	R	H	E
Massachusetts ◄	0	0	0	0	0	3	3	6	1
Ohio	0	0	1	0	0	1	2	3	1
WP: Samuel Falkson (1–0) LP: Kyle Cotcamp (0–1) Sv: John Adams (1); Home runs: MA: None; OH: None; Boxscore

==== Georgia 9, Oregon 4 ====
August 17 8:00 pm EDT Lamade Stadium
Team	1	2	3	4	5	6	R	H	E
Oregon	0	0	0	0	1	3	4	5	2
(Georgia (U.S. state)) Georgia ◄	2	2	4	1	0	X	9	8	5
WP: Clint Wynn (1–0) LP: Levi Rudolph (0–1); Home runs: OR: None; GA: None; Boxscore

==== Ohio 10, Georgia 2 ====
August 18 8:00 pm EDT Lamade Stadium
Team	1	2	3	4	5	6	R	H	E
Ohio ◄	1	0	3	2	0	4	10	12	0
(Georgia (U.S. state)) Georgia	2	0	0	0	0	0	2	4	2
WP: Tyler Richards (1–0) LP: Kendall Scott (0–1); Home runs: OH: Brandon Green (1); GA: Micah Wells (1); Boxscore

==== Oregon 1, Massachusetts 0 ====
August 19 3:30 pm EDT Lamade Stadium
Team	1	2	3	4	5	6	R	H	E
Oregon ◄	0	0	0	0	0	1	1	6	1
Massachusetts	0	0	0	0	0	0	0	2	0
WP: Mitch Lomax (1–0) LP: Joseph Guarino Jr. (0–1) Sv: Calvin Hermanson (1); Home runs: OR: Reid Penney (1); MA: None; Boxscore

==== Oregon 6, Ohio 1 ====
August 21 3:00 pm EDT Little League Volunteer Stadium
Team	1	2	3	4	5	6	R	H	E
Ohio	0	1	0	0	0	0	1	2	2
Oregon ◄	2	0	0	2	2	x	6	10	0
WP: Levi Rudolph (1–1) LP: Kyle Cotcamp (0–2) Sv: Calvin Hermanson (2); Home runs: OH: None; OR: Austin Andrews (1); Boxscore

==== Georgia 8, Massachusetts 1 ====
August 21 6:00 pm EDT Little League Volunteer Stadium
Team	1	2	3	4	5	6	R	H	E
Massachusetts	0	0	1	0	0	0	1	4	2
(Georgia (U.S. state)) Georgia ◄	2	4	0	2	0	X	8	10	1
WP: Dalton Carriker (1–0) LP: Samuel Falkson (1–1); Home runs: MA: None; GA: Dalton Carriker (1); Boxscore

=== Pool B ===
Pool B
Rank	Region	Record	Runs Allowed	Run Ratio
1	Texas	2–0	1	0.083
2	Arizona	2–1	13	0.722
3	Minnesota	1–2	18	1.000
4	Maryland	0–2	20	1.667

==== Arizona 16, Maryland 6 ====
August 18 3:00 pm EDT Lamade Stadium
Team	1	2	3	4	5	6	R	H	E
Arizona ◄	4	3	2	4	0	3	16	17	0
Maryland	1	3	1	0	1	0	6	9	1
WP: Ryan Pechloff (1–0) LP: Craig East (0–1); Home runs: AZ: Seth Freitheim 2 (2), Luke Parrish (1), Cody Bellinger (1), Ryan Aebly (1); MD: Craig East (1), Edgar Galiz (1); Boxscore

==== Texas 6, Minnesota 0 ====
August 18 6:00 pm EDT Little League Volunteer Stadium
Team	1	2	3	4	5	6	R	H	E
Texas ◄	1	0	3	0	2	0	6	6	0
Minnesota	0	0	0	0	0	0	0	3	3
WP: Garrett Williams (1–0) LP: Tanner Lowe (0–1); Home runs: TX: Tyler Thorne 2 (2); MN: None; Boxscore

==== Texas 5, Arizona 1 ====
August 19 Noon EDT Little League Volunteer Stadium
Team	1	2	3	4	5	6	R	H	E
Texas ◄	2	0	2	0	1	0	5	6	1
Arizona	0	0	0	1	0	0	1	4	0
WP: Zane Ancell (1–0) LP: Skyler Palermo (0–1); Home runs: TX: Bryndan Arredondo 2 (2), Zane Ancell (1); AZ: None; Boxscore

==== Minnesota 4, Maryland 3 ====
August 19 8:00 pm EDT Lamade Stadium
Team	1	2	3	4	5	6	R	H	E
Maryland	0	0	0	3	0	0	3	1	0
Minnesota ◄	2	0	1	0	0	1	4	7	2
WP: Cody Herrmann (1–0) LP: Canaan Cropper (0–1); Home runs: MD: Canaan Cropper (1); MN: Tanner Lowe 2 (2); Boxscore

==== Texas vs. Maryland ====
This game was canceled due to rain to permit other games to be rescheduled. The result of this game would have had no effect on pool standings. However, the game was counted for determining pitching eligibility.

==== Arizona 9, Minnesota 2 ====
August 22 4:00 pm EDT Lamade Stadium
Team	1	2	3	4	5	6	R	H	E
Arizona ◄	0	0	2	0	7	0	9	9	0
Minnesota	1	1	0	0	0	0	2	4	2
WP: Seth Freitheim (1–0) LP: Tanner Lowe (0–2); Home runs: AZ: Seth Freitheim (3); MN: None; Boxscore

=== Pool C ===
Pool C
Rank	Region	Record	Runs Allowed	Run Ratio
1	Japan	2–0	4	0.333
2	Curaçao	2–1	12	0.667
3	Canada	1–2	18	1.059
4	Saudi Arabia	0–2	15	1.5

==== Japan 10, Curaçao 3 ====
August 17 4:00 pm EDT Lamade Stadium
Team	1	2	3	4	5	6	R	H	E
Japan ◄	0	1	6	1	0	2	10	9	0
Curaçao	3	0	0	0	0	0	3	3	0
WP: Ryo Kanekubo (1–0) LP: Entwin Reigina (0–1); Home runs: JPN: None; CUR: Rileyson Liberia (1); Boxscore

==== Canada 13, Saudi Arabia 5 ====
August 18 11:00 am EDT Little League Volunteer Stadium
Team	1	2	3	4	5	6	R	H	E
Saudi Arabia	0	0	0	0	5	0	5	3	3
Canada ◄	2	1	0	2	8	X	13	12	4
WP: Tanner Sandstrom (1–0) LP: Beau Branton (0–1); Home runs: SAU: None; CAN: Jackson Temple (1), Parker Stefaniuk (1); Boxscore

==== Curaçao 2, Saudi Arabia 0 ====
August 18 7:00 pm EDT Little League Volunteer Stadium
Team	1	2	3	4	5	6	R	H	E
Saudi Arabia	0	0	0	0	0	0	0	1	1
Curaçao ◄	0	0	0	1	1	X	2	8	0
WP: Vincent Anthonia (1–0) LP: Andrew Otis (0–1); Home runs: SAU: None; CUR: Deion Rosalia (1); Boxscore

==== Japan 7, Canada 1 ====
August 21 1:00 pm EDT Lamade Stadium
Team	1	2	3	4	5	6	R	H	E
Canada	0	0	0	0	0	1	1	4	2
Japan ◄	0	2	0	0	5	X	7	7	0
WP: Ryo Ogawa (1–0) LP: Ethan Cornfield (0–1); Home runs: CAN: None; JPN: Junsho Kiuchi (1); Boxscore

==== Japan vs. Saudi Arabia ====
This game was canceled due to rain to permit other games to be rescheduled. The result of this game would have had no effect on pool standings. However, the game was counted for determining pitching eligibility.

==== Curaçao 6, Canada 2 ====
August 22 14:00 EDT Volunteer Stadium
Team	1	2	3	4	5	6	R	H	E
Curaçao ◄	0	3	0	1	2	0	6	9	1
Canada	0	0	2	0	0	0	2	4	5
WP: Ulrick Carmelia (1–0) LP: Shaylen Buis (0–1); Home runs: CUR: Juremi Profar (1); CAN: None; Boxscore

=== Pool D ===
Pool D
Rank	Region	Record	Runs Allowed	Run Ratio
1	Venezuela	3–0	4	0.222
2	Taiwan	2–1	5	0.300
3	Mexico	1–2	16	1.000
4	Netherlands	0–3	43	3.308

==== Venezuela 2, Taiwan 1 ====
August 17 6:00 pm EDT Little League Volunteer Stadium
Team	1	2	3	4	5	6	R	H	E
Taiwan	0	0	0	0	1	0	1	2	0
Venezuela◄	0	1	0	0	0	1	2	3	0
WP: Bryan Charry (1–0) LP: Chao-Min Wang (0–1); Home runs: TWN: None; VEN: None; Boxscore

==== Mexico 11, Netherlands 1 ====
August 18 1:00 pm EDT Little League Volunteer Stadium
Team	1	2	3	4	5	6	R	H	E
Netherlands	0	1	0	0	-	-	1	3	4
Mexico ◄	5	0	0	6	-	-	11	8	0
WP: Antonio Pantoja (1–0) LP: Kentaro Il (0–1); Home runs: NED: Radjanne Coffie (1); MEX: Isaac Camaño (1); Notes: Completed early due to mercy rule. Boxscore

==== Taiwan 11, Netherlands 1 ====
August 18 1:00 pm EDT Little League Volunteer Stadium
Team	1	2	3	4	5	6	R	H	E
Netherlands	0	0	0	1	0	-	1	3	6
Taiwan ◄	2	0	1	7	1	-	11	8	0
WP: Chung-Yen Chen (1–0) LP: Kentaro Il (0–2); Home runs: NED: None; TPE: None

==== Venezuela 21, Netherlands 2 ====
August 18 4:00 pm EDT Lamade Stadium
Team	1	2	3	4	5	6	R	H	E
Netherlands	1	0	1	0	-	-	2	3	4
Venezuela◄	6	12	3	0	-	-	21	19	2
WP: Reinaldo Amaro (1–0) LP: Radjanne Coffie (0–1); Home runs: NED: None; VEN: Omar Villalobos 2 (3), Miguel Romero 2 (3), Alberth Castillo (1); Notes: Completed early due to mercy rule. Boxscore

==== Taiwan 4, Mexico 2 ====
August 22 Noon EDT Lamade Stadium
Team	1	2	3	4	5	6	R	H	E
Taiwan ◄	1	0	1	2	0	0	4	4	2
Mexico	0	0	0	1	1	0	2	4	1
WP: Chi-Yuan Chen (1–0) LP: Antonio Pantoja (1–1); Home runs: TWN: Kai-Ying Chen (1), Jen-Chieh Liu (1); MEX: None; Boxscore

==== Venezuela 11, Mexico 1 ====
August 22 7:00 pm EDT Little League Volunteer Stadium
Team	1	2	3	4	5	6	R	H	E
Venezuela ◄	3	2	0	0	0	6	11	10	0
Mexico	0	0	0	0	1	0	1	3	1
WP: Alberth Castillo (1–0) LP: Daniel Rosales (0–1); Home runs: VEN: Omar Villalobos (4), Ronny Mejias (1); MEX: Antonio Pantoja (1); Boxscore

== Elimination round ==
Quarter-finals
August 23 – Noon - Volunteer (F/7)
Venezuela	2
Curaçao	4
August 23 – 5:00 pm - Volunteer (F/10)
Japan	4
Taiwan	3
August 23 – 3:00 pm - Lamade
Texas	8
Oregon	2
August 23 – 7:30 pm - Lamade (F/5)
(Georgia (U.S. state)) Georgia	16
Arizona	6

Semi-finals
August 25 – 12:30 pm - Lamade
Curaçao	4
Japan	7
August 25 – 3:30 pm - Lamade
Texas	2
(Georgia (U.S. state)) Georgia	5

Final
August 26 – 3:30 pm - Lamade (F/8)
Japan	2
(United States) (Georgia (U.S. state)) Georgia	3
Third place
August 26 – Noon - Volunteer
Curaçao	0
(United States) Texas	1

=== Semifinals ===
==== Curaçao 4, Venezuela 2 ====
August 23 Noon EDT Little League Volunteer Stadium
Team	1	2	3	4	5	6	7	R	H	E
Venezuela	0	0	0	1	0	0	1	2	6	0
Curaçao ◄	1	0	0	0	0	0	3	4	5	0
WP: Entwin Reigina (1–1) LP: Reinaldo Amaro (1–1); Home runs: VEN: Bryan Charry (1); CUR: Vincent Anthonia (1), Deion Rosalia (2); Boxscore

==== Texas 8, Oregon 2 ====
August 23 3:00 pm EDT Lamade Stadium
Team	1	2	3	4	5	6	R	H	E
Texas ◄	0	0	4	1	0	3	8	7	0
Oregon	0	2	0	0	0	0	2	3	1
WP: Garrett Williams (2–0) LP: Mitch Lomax (1–1); Home runs: TX: Bryndan Arredondo (3), Taylor Bridges (1); OR: None; Boxscore

==== Japan 4, Taiwan 3 ====
August 23 5:00 pm EDT Little League Volunteer Stadium
Team	1	2	3	4	5	6	7	8	9	10	R	H	E
Taiwan	2	0	0	0	0	1	0	0	0	0	3	3	3
Japan ◄	0	0	0	3	0	1	0	0	0	1	4	8	1
WP: Junsho Kiuchi (1–0) LP: Jen-Chieh Liu (0–1); Home runs: TWN: None; JPN: Junsho Kiuchi (2); Boxscore

==== Georgia 16, Arizona 6 ====
August 23 7:00 pm EDT Lamade Stadium
Team	1	2	3	4	5	6	R	H	E
Arizona	2	0	2	0	2	-	6	6	3
(Georgia (U.S. state)) Georgia ◄	5	0	0	4	7	-	16	14	0
WP: Kendall Scott (1–1) LP: Skyler Palermo (0–2); Home runs: AZ: James Ziegler (1), Kyle Pechloff (1); GA: Payton Purvis 2 (2), Dalton Carriker (2), Micah Wells (2); Notes: Completed early due to mercy rule.

=== Finals ===
==== Japan 7, Curaçao 4 ====
August 25 12:30 pm EDT Lamade Stadium
Team	1	2	3	4	5	6	R	H	E
Curaçao	1	1	1	0	0	1	4	9	3
Japan ◄	0	0	2	0	1	4	7	12	1
WP: Yuya Fukushima (1–0) LP: Rudson Pietersz (0–1); Home runs: CUR: None; JPN: Ryo Kanekubo 2 (2); Boxscore

==== Georgia 5, Texas 2 ====
August 25 3:30 pm EDT Lamade Stadium
Team	1	2	3	4	5	6	R	H	E
(Georgia (U.S. state)) Georgia ◄	1	0	3	0	0	1	5	9	0
Texas	0	0	2	0	0	0	2	4	1
WP: Clint Wynn (2–0) LP: Stephen Smith (0–1); Home runs: gA: Dalton Carriker (3); TX: Garrett Williams (1); Boxscore

=== Consolation Game ===
==== Texas 1, Curaçao 0 ====
August 26 Noon EDT Little League Volunteer Stadium
Team	1	2	3	4	5	6	R	H	E
Texas ◄	0	0	0	0	1	0	1	2	1
Curaçao	0	0	0	0	0	0	0	0	1
WP: Garrett Williams (3–0) LP: Vincent Anthonia (1–1) Sv: Taylor Bridges (1); Home runs: TX: None; CUR: None; Boxscore

=== Championship Game ===
==== Georgia 3, Japan 2 ====
August 26 3:30 pm EDT Lamade Stadium
Team	1	2	3	4	5	6	7	8	R	H	E
Japan	1	1	0	0	0	0	0	0	2	5	1
(Georgia (U.S. state)) Georgia ◄	0	2	0	0	0	0	0	1	3	4	0
WP: Zane Conlon (1–0) LP: Junsho Kiuchi (1–1); Home runs: JPN: None; GA: Dalton Carriker (4); Boxscore
