= 2016 Little League World Series results =

Children's baseball competition results

The results of the 2016 Little League World Series was determined between August 18 and 28, 2016 in South Williamsport, Pennsylvania. 16 teams were divided into two groups, one with eight teams from the United States and another with eight international teams, with both groups playing a modified double-elimination tournament. In each group, the last remaining undefeated team faced the last remaining team with one loss, with the winners of those games advancing to play for the Little League World Series championship.

Double-Elimination
United States
United States	Winner's bracket						
United States	(Rhode Island) RI 2 (New York (state)) NY 7◄ Linescore	(Oregon) OR 2 (Tennessee) TN 3◄ Linescore	(California) CA 1 (Iowa) IA 5◄ Linescore	(Kentucky) KY 11◄ (Texas) TX 1 (F/5); Linescore	(Tennessee) TN 1 (New York (state)) NY 3◄ Linescore	(Kentucky) KY 14◄ (Iowa) IA 4 (F/7); Linescore	(Kentucky) KY 10 (New York (state)) NY 13◄ Linescore
United States	Loser's bracket						
United States	(Oregon) OR 0 (Rhode Island) RI 8◄ Linescore	(California) CA 5◄ (Texas) TX 0 Linescore	(Rhode Island) RI 2 (Iowa) IA 3◄ Linescore	(Tennessee) TN 4◄ (California) CA 2 (F/7); Linescore	(Tennessee) TN 14◄ (Iowa) IA 3 (F/7); Linescore	(Tennessee) TN 8◄ (Kentucky) KY 4 Linescore	
International
International	Winner's bracket						
International	(Panama) PAN 10◄ (Mexico) MEX 2 Linescore	(Italy) ITA 1 (Australia) AUS 3◄ Linescore	(Canada) CAN 10◄ (Japan) JPN 4 Linescore	(South Korea) KOR 3◄ (Curaçao) CUR 0 Linescore	(Australia) AUS 2 (Panama) PAN 3◄ Linescore	(Canada) CAN 0 (F/5) (South Korea) KOR 10◄ Linescore	(South Korea) KOR 2 (Panama) PAN 3◄ Linescore
International	Loser's bracket						
International	(Mexico) MEX 12◄ (Italy) ITA 7 Linescore	(Japan) JPN 1 (Curaçao) CUR 2◄ Linescore	(Canada) CAN 1 (Mexico) MEX 7◄ Linescore	(Australia) AUS 2◄ (Curaçao) CUR 1 Linescore	(Mexico) MEX 10◄ (Australia) AUS 0 (F/4); Linescore	(South Korea) KOR 7◄ (Mexico) MEX 0 Linescore	
Consolation games	Italy 2 Oregon 6◄ Linescore				Japan 6◄ Texas 1 Linescore		
Single-Elimination
International championship	South Korea 7◄ Panama 2 Linescore						
United States championship	Tennessee 2 (New York (state)) New York 4◄ Linescore						
Third place game	Tennessee 2 Panama 3◄ Linescore						
World championship game	South Korea 1 (New York (state)) New York 2◄ Linescore						

== Double-elimination stage ==
=== United States ===
Upper round 1	Upper round 2	Upper final	Final
August 18 – Game 2
(New York (state)) New York	7
August 22 – Game 14
Rhode Island	2
(New York (state)) New York	3
August 18 – Game 4
Tennessee	1
Oregon	2
August 24 – Game 24
Tennessee	3
(New York (state)) New York	13
August 19 – Game 6
Kentucky	10
California	1
August 22 – Game 16 (F/7)
Iowa	5
Iowa	4
August 19 – Game 8 (F/5)
Kentucky	14
Texas	1	August 27 – U.S. championship
Kentucky	11	(New York (state)) New York	4
Tennessee	2
Lower round 1	Lower round 2	Lower round 3	Lower final
August 23 – Game 18
August 20 – Game 10	Iowa	3	August 25 – Game 26
Rhode Island	8	Rhode Island	2	August 24 – Game 22 (F/5)	Kentucky	4
Oregon	0	Iowa	3	Tennessee	8
August 23 – Game 20 (F/7)	Tennessee	14
August 20 – Game 12	Tennessee	4
California	5	California	2
Texas	0

==== Winner's bracket ====
===== Game 2: New York 7, Rhode Island 2 =====
August 18 3:00 pm EDT Howard J. Lamade Stadium
Team	1	2	3	4	5	6	R	H	E
Rhode Island	0	0	0	0	0	2	2	4	0
(New York (state)) New York ◄	3	3	0	1	0	X	7	9	3
WP: Ryan Harlost (1–0) LP: Colin Lemieux (0–1); Home runs: RI: None; NY: Ryan Harlost (1); Boxscore

===== Game 4: Tennessee 3, Oregon 2 =====
August 18 7:00 pm EDT Howard J. Lamade Stadium
Team	1	2	3	4	5	6	R	H	E
Oregon	0	0	2	0	0	0	2	2	0
Tennessee ◄	0	0	1	0	0	2	3	6	1
WP: Zach McWilliams (1–0) LP: Zack Reynolds (0–1); Home runs: OR: None; TN: Tanner Jones (1); Boxscore

===== Game 6: Iowa 5, California 1 =====
August 19 4:00 pm EDT Howard J. Lamade Stadium
Team	1	2	3	4	5	6	R	H	E
California	0	1	0	0	0	0	1	4	1
Iowa ◄	0	0	1	2	2	X	5	7	0
WP: Josh Larson (1–0) LP: Daniel Leon (0–1) Sv: Michael Siemer (1); Home runs: CA: None; IA: J. T. Garcia (1); Boxscore

===== Game 8: Kentucky 11, Texas 1 =====
August 19 8:00 pm EDT Howard J. Lamade Stadium
Team	1	2	3	4	5	6	R	H	E
Kentucky ◄	3	2	0	1	5	–	11	9	0
Texas	1	0	0	0	0	–	1	3	8
WP: Devin Obee (1–0) LP: Britton Moore (0–1); Home runs: KY: Devin Obee (1); TX: Dominic Tellis (1); Notes: Completed early due to mercy rule. Boxscore

===== Game 14: New York 3, Tennessee 1 =====
August 22 3:00 pm EDT Howard J. Lamade Stadium
Team	1	2	3	4	5	6	R	H	E
Tennessee	0	0	0	0	0	1	1	4	1
(New York (state)) New York ◄	2	0	1	0	0	X	3	3	0
WP: Michael Mancini (1–0) LP: Brock Duffer (0–1) Sv: Ryan Harlost (1); Home runs: TN: Zach McWilliams (1); NY: Ryan Harlost (2); Boxscore

===== Game 16: Kentucky 14, Iowa 4 =====
August 22 8:00 pm EDT Howard J. Lamade Stadium
Team	1	2	3	4	5	6	7	R	H	E
Kentucky ◄	0	0	1	1	1	0	11	14	12	1
Iowa	0	1	0	2	0	0	1	4	7	0
WP: Isaiah Head (1–0) LP: Michael Siemer (0–1); Boxscore

===== Game 24: New York 13, Kentucky 10 =====
August 24 7:30 pm EDT Howard J. Lamade Stadium
Team	1	2	3	4	5	6	R	H	E
Kentucky	3	0	1	4	2	0	10	12	1
(New York (state)) New York ◄	2	3	3	2	3	X	13	14	2
WP: Jude Abbadessa (1–0) LP: Jackson Moore (0–1); Home runs: KY: Carson Myers (1); NY: Jude Abbadessa (1); Boxscore

==== Loser's bracket ====
===== Game 10: Rhode Island 8, Oregon 0 =====
August 20 3:00 pm EDT Howard J. Lamade Stadium
Team	1	2	3	4	5	6	R	H	E
Oregon	0	0	0	0	0	0	0	5	0
Rhode Island ◄	0	2	0	4	2	X	8	12	0
WP: Colin Lemieux (1–1) LP: Blaine Causey (0–1); Home runs: OR: None; RI: Kenny Rix (1); Notes: Oregon is eliminated. Boxscore

===== Game 12: California 5, Texas 0 =====
August 20 8:00 pm EDT Howard J. Lamade Stadium
Team	1	2	3	4	5	6	R	H	E
California ◄	2	1	2	0	0	0	5	4	0
Texas	0	0	0	0	0	0	0	2	0
WP: Victor Lizarraga (1–0) LP: Dominic Tellis (0–1); Home runs: CA: Devin Hinojosa (1); TX: None; Notes: Texas is eliminated. Boxscore

===== Game 18: Iowa 3, Rhode Island 2 =====
August 23 3:00 pm EDT Howard J. Lamade Stadium
Team	1	2	3	4	5	6	R	H	E
Rhode Island	1	0	0	0	0	1	2	8	2
Iowa ◄	0	0	0	0	1	2	3	6	0
WP: Tyler Moore (1–0) LP: Colin Lemieux (1–2); Home runs: RI: Kenny Rix (2); IA: Kaiden Dinh (1); Notes: Rhode Island is eliminated. Boxscore

===== Game 20: Tennessee 4, California 2 =====
August 23 7:30 pm EDT Howard J. Lamade Stadium
Team	1	2	3	4	5	6	7	R	H	E
Tennessee ◄	0	1	0	0	1	0	2	4	9	2
California	0	0	0	0	2	0	0	2	8	1
WP: Ryan Oden (1–0) LP: JonLuke Hobdy (0–1) Sv: Robert Carroll (1); Home runs: TN: Tyler Jones (1), Zach McWilliams (2); CA: Lucas Marrujo (1); Notes: California is eliminated. Boxscore

===== Game 22: Tennessee 14, Iowa 3 =====
August 24 3:00 pm EDT Howard J. Lamade Stadium
Team	1	2	3	4	5	6	R	H	E
Tennessee ◄	0	1	0	6	7	–	14	11	1
Iowa	0	0	3	0	0	–	3	3	2
WP: Robert Carroll (1–0) LP: Josh Larson (1–1); Home runs: TN: R. J. Moore (1), Ethan Jackson (1); IA: Kaiden Dinh (2); Notes: Completed early due to mercy rule. Iowa is eliminated. Boxscore

===== Game 26: Tennessee 8, Kentucky 4 =====
August 25 7:30 pm EDT Howard J. Lamade Stadium
Team	1	2	3	4	5	6	R	H	E
Tennessee ◄	0	2	0	5	0	1	8	9	1
Kentucky	2	0	2	0	0	0	4	8	1
WP: Ryan Oden (2–0) LP: Drew Wolfram (0–1) Sv: R. J. Moore (1); Home runs: TN: Zach McWilliams (3); KY: None; Notes: Kentucky is eliminated. Boxscore

=== International ===
Upper round 1	Upper round 2	Upper final	Final
August 18 – Game 1
Panama	10
August 22 – Game 13
Mexico	2
Panama	3
August 18 – Game 3
Australia	2
Australia	3
August 24 – Game 23
Italy	1
Panama	3
August 19 – Game 5
South Korea	2
Japan	4
August 22 – Game 15 (F/5)
Canada	10
Canada	0
August 19 – Game 7
South Korea	10
South Korea	3	August 27 – International championship
Curaçao	0	Panama	2
South Korea	7
Lower round 1	Lower round 2	Lower round 3	Lower final
August 23 – Game 17
August 20 – Game 9	Canada	1	August 25 – Game 25
Mexico	12	Mexico	7	August 24 – Game 21 (F/4)	South Korea	7
Italy	7	Mexico	10	Mexico	0
August 23 – Game 19	Australia	0
August 20 – Game 11	Australia	2
Japan	1	Curaçao	1
Curaçao	2

==== Winner's bracket ====
===== Game 1: Panama 10, Mexico 2 =====
August 18 1:00 pm EDT Volunteer Stadium
Team	1	2	3	4	5	6	R	H	E
Panama ◄	0	0	4	0	1	5	10	6	1
Mexico	0	0	0	2	0	0	2	2	3
WP: Joaquin Tejada (1–0) LP: Victor Juarez (0–1); Home runs: PAN: Esmith Pineda (1); MEX: None; Boxscore

===== Game 3: Australia 3, Italy 1 =====
August 18 5:00 pm EDT Volunteer Stadium
Team	1	2	3	4	5	6	R	H	E
Italy	0	0	0	0	0	1	1	2	1
Australia ◄	0	1	1	1	0	X	3	6	0
WP: Clayton Campbell (1–0) LP: Elia Sartini (0–1) Sv: Harrison Wheeldon (1); Boxscore

===== Game 5: Canada 10, Japan 4 =====
August 19 2:00 pm EDT Volunteer Stadium
Team	1	2	3	4	5	6	R	H	E
Canada ◄	2	0	2	2	3	1	10	10	2
Japan	0	0	0	1	1	2	4	6	2
WP: Loreto Siniscalchi (1–0) LP: Rin Ikemoto (0–1) Sv: Nicola Barba (1); Home runs: CAN: Cristian Santarelli (1), Loreto Siniscalchi (1); JPN: None; Boxscore

===== Game 7: South Korea 3, Curaçao 0 =====
August 19 6:00 pm EDT Volunteer Stadium
Team	1	2	3	4	5	6	R	H	E
South Korea ◄	2	0	0	0	0	1	3	5	2
Curaçao	0	0	0	0	0	0	0	3	0
WP: Junho Jeong (1–0) LP: Jurrangelo Cijntje (0–1) Sv: Sangheon Park (1); Boxscore

===== Game 13: Panama 3, Australia 2 =====
August 22 1:00 pm EDT Volunteer Stadium
Team	1	2	3	4	5	6	R	H	E
Australia	0	0	0	0	0	2	2	4	0
Panama ◄	0	1	0	1	0	1	3	6	0
WP: Carlos Gonzalez (1–0) LP: William Edwards (0–1); Home runs: AUS: Brent Iredale (1); PAN: Joaquin Tejada (1); Boxscore

===== Game 15: South Korea 10, Canada 0 =====
August 22 6:00 pm EDT Volunteer Stadium
Team	1	2	3	4	5	6	R	H	E
Canada	0	0	0	0	0	–	0	1	1
South Korea ◄	0	2	0	4	4	–	10	12	0
WP: Wontae Cho (1–0) LP: Nicola Barba (0–1) Sv: Jaekyeong Kim (1); Home runs: CAN: None; KOR: Jungtaek Ru (1), Moosung Kim (1), Wontae Cho (1); Notes: Completed early due to mercy rule. Boxscore

===== Game 23: Panama 3, South Korea 2 =====
August 24 5:30 pm EDT Volunteer Stadium
Team	1	2	3	4	5	6	R	H	E
South Korea	0	0	0	2	0	0	2	1	1
Panama ◄	0	0	0	0	3	X	3	3	2
WP: Edwar Bethancourth (1–0) LP: Junho Jeong (1–1) Sv: Joaquin Tejada (1); Home runs: KOR: None; PAN: Esmith Pineda (2); Notes: This was the first time that a team from South Korea lost at the LLWS. Prior to this game, teams from South Korea had a combined 13–0 record. Boxscore

==== Loser's bracket ====
===== Game 9: Mexico 12, Italy 7 =====
August 20 Noon EDT Volunteer Stadium
Team	1	2	3	4	5	6	R	H	E
Mexico ◄	0	1	1	2	0	8	12	12	6
Italy	0	0	0	1	0	6	7	6	3
WP: Jose Angel Leal (1–0) LP: Tommaso Adorni (0–1) Sv: Milton Gonzalez (1); Home runs: MEX: Gael Isaac Cortez 2 (2); ITA: None; Notes: Italy is eliminated. Boxscore

===== Game 11: Curaçao 2, Japan 1 =====
August 20 6:00 pm EDT Volunteer Stadium
Team	1	2	3	4	5	6	R	H	E
Japan	0	0	0	1	0	0	1	4	1
Curaçao ◄	0	0	0	1	1	X	2	3	1
WP: Jadon Gosepa (1–0) LP: Sosuke Igawa (0–1) Sv: Gedionne Marlin (1); Home runs: JPN: So Hirao (1); CUR: Donovan Antonia (1); Notes: Japan is eliminated. Boxscore

===== Game 17: Mexico 7, Canada 1 =====
August 23 1:00 pm EDT Volunteer Stadium
Team	1	2	3	4	5	6	R	H	E
Canada	0	0	0	1	0	0	1	1	2
Mexico ◄	1	0	4	0	2	X	7	10	0
WP: Victor Juarez (1–1) LP: Stefano Dal Sasso (0–1) Sv: Luis Lauro Nuncio (1); Home runs: CAN: None; MEX: Jose Angel Leal (1); Notes: Canada is eliminated. Boxscore

===== Game 19: Australia 2, Curaçao 1 =====
August 23 5:30 pm EDT Volunteer Stadium
Team	1	2	3	4	5	6	R	H	E
Australia ◄	1	0	0	0	1	0	2	4	1
Curaçao	0	0	0	0	0	1	1	3	0
WP: Clayton Campbell (2–0) LP: Danchelo Valentina (0–1); Home runs: AUS: Stephen Courtney (1); CUR: None; Notes: Curaçao is eliminated. Boxscore

===== Game 21: Mexico 10, Australia 0 =====
August 24 1:00 pm EDT Volunteer Stadium
Team	1	2	3	4	5	6	R	H	E
Mexico ◄	2	0	6	2	–	–	10	11	0
Australia	0	0	0	0	–	–	0	1	2
WP: Jose Angel Leal (2–0) LP: Harrison Wheeldon (0–1) Sv: Gael Isaac Cortez (1); Home runs: MEX: Victor Juarez (1), Jose Angel Leal (2); AUS: None; Notes: Completed early due to mercy rule. Australia is eliminated. Boxscore

===== Game 25: South Korea 7, Mexico 0 =====
August 25 3:00 pm EDT Howard J. Lamade Stadium
Team	1	2	3	4	5	6	R	H	E
South Korea ◄	1	5	0	1	0	0	7	5	0
Mexico	0	0	0	0	0	0	0	1	1
WP: Sangheon Park (1–0) LP: Victor Juarez (1–2) Sv: Wontae Cho (1); Home runs: KOR: Seum Kwon 2 (2), Jaekyeong Kim (1); MEX: None; Notes: Mexico is eliminated. Boxscore

=== Consolation games ===
==== Game A: Oregon 6, Italy 2 ====
August 22 11:00 am EDT Howard J. Lamade Stadium
Team	1	2	3	4	5	6	R	H	E
Italy	0	0	0	0	1	1	2	5	3
Oregon ◄	0	1	0	5	0	X	6	9	1
WP: Isaiah Jensen (1–0) LP: Filippo Laghi (0–1); Boxscore

==== Game B: Japan 6, Texas 1 ====
August 23 11:00 am EDT Howard J. Lamade Stadium
Team	1	2	3	4	5	6	R	H	E
Japan ◄	2	1	0	1	0	2	6	10	0
Texas	0	1	0	0	0	0	1	5	0
WP: Ryota Endo (1–0) LP: Britton Moore (0–2); Boxscore

== Single-elimination stage ==
=== International championship: South Korea 7, Panama 2 ===
August 27 12:30 pm EDT Howard J. Lamade Stadium
Team	1	2	3	4	5	6	R	H	E
South Korea ◄	1	5	1	0	0	0	7	11	0
Panama	1	0	0	0	1	0	2	6	0
WP: Youbin Choi (1–0) LP: Joaquin Tejada (1–1); Home runs: KOR: Seum Kwon (3), Jaekyeong Kim (2), Wontae Cho (2); PAN: None; Notes: Panama is eliminated. Boxscore

=== United States championship: New York 4, Tennessee 2 ===
August 27 3:30 pm EDT Howard J. Lamade Stadium
Team	1	2	3	4	5	6	R	H	E
Tennessee	0	0	0	0	0	2	2	2	0
(New York (state)) New York ◄	0	0	0	4	0	X	4	5	0
WP: Michael Mancini (2–0) LP: Brock Duffer (0–2) Sv: Jude Abbadessa (1); Home runs: TN: Zach McWilliams (4); NY: None; Notes: Tennessee is eliminated. Boxscore

=== Third place game: Panama 3, Tennessee 2 ===
August 28 10:00 am EDT Howard J. Lamade Stadium
Team	1	2	3	4	5	6	R	H	E
Tennessee	2	0	0	0	0	0	2	2	0
Panama ◄	0	0	0	0	0	3	3	4	0
WP: Jose Torres (1–0) LP: Zach McWilliams (1–1); Home runs: TN: None; PAN: Esmith Pineda (3), Carlos Gonzalez (1); Boxscore

=== World championship game: New York 2, South Korea 1 ===
August 28 3:00 pm EDT Howard J. Lamade Stadium
Team	1	2	3	4	5	6	R	H	E
South Korea	0	0	0	0	1	0	1	5	1
(New York (state)) New York ◄	0	0	0	2	0	X	2	3	0
WP: Ryan Harlost (2–0) LP: Junho Jeong (1–2); Home runs: KOR: Yoomin Lee (1); NY: None; Boxscore
