= 2014 Little League World Series results =

Children's baseball competition results

The results of the 2014 Little League World Series was determined between August 14 and August 24, 2014 in South Williamsport, Pennsylvania. 16 teams were divided into two groups, one with eight teams from the United States and another with eight international teams, with both groups playing a modified double-elimination tournament. In each group, the last remaining undefeated team faced the last remaining team with one loss, with the winners of those games advancing to play for the Little League World Series championship.

On February 11, 2015, Jackie Robinson West had all of its tournament wins forfeited after it was found that the team used ineligible players from outside the Chicago area. Mountain Ridge Little League of Las Vegas, Nevada, was named the official U.S. champion.

Double-Elimination
United States
United States	Winner's bracket						
United States	(Illinois) IL 0 (F/5) (Washington (state)) WA 6◄ Linescore	(Nevada) NV 12◄ (South Dakota) SD 2 (F/5); Linescore	(Pennsylvania) PA 4◄ (Tennessee) TN 0 Linescore	(Texas) TX 6◄ (Rhode Island) RI 4 Linescore	(Nevada) NV 13◄ (Illinois) IL 2 (F/5); Linescore	(Texas) TX 6 (Pennsylvania) PA 7◄ Linescore	(Nevada) NV 8◄ (Pennsylvania) PA 1 Linescore
United States	Loser's bracket						
United States	(Washington (state)) WA 7◄ (South Dakota) SD 5 Linescore	(Tennessee) TN 7 (Rhode Island) RI 8◄ Linescore	(Texas) TX 11◄ (Washington (state)) WA 4 Linescore	(Illinois) IL 8◄ (Rhode Island) RI 7 Linescore	(Texas) TX 1 (Illinois) IL 6◄ Linescore	(Pennsylvania) PA 5 (Illinois) IL 6◄ Linescore	
International
International	Winner's bracket						
International	(South Korea) KOR 10◄ (Czech Republic) CZE 3 Linescore	(Puerto Rico) PUR 16◄ (Australia) AUS 3 (F/4); Linescore	(Canada) CAN 3 (Mexico) MEX 4◄ Linescore	(Japan) JPN 1◄ (Venezuela) VEN 0 Linescore	(South Korea) KOR 8◄ (Puerto Rico) PUR 5 Linescore	(Mexico) MEX 5 (Japan) JPN 9◄ Linescore	(South Korea) KOR 4◄ (Japan) JPN 2 Linescore
International	Loser's bracket						
International	(Australia) AUS 10◄ (Czech Republic) CZE 1 Linescore	(Canada) CAN 0 (F/5) (Venezuela) VEN 10◄ Linescore	(Australia) AUS 2 (Mexico) MEX 6◄ Linescore	(Venezuela) VEN 2◄ (Puerto Rico) PUR 1 Linescore	(Venezuela) VEN 1 (F/5) (Mexico) MEX 11◄ Linescore	(Japan) JPN 12◄ (Mexico) MEX 1 (F/5); Linescore	
Crossover games	Czech Republic 3 South Dakota 5◄ Linescore				Canada 9 Tennessee 12◄ Linescore		
Single-Elimination
International Championship	South Korea 12◄ Japan 3 Linescore						
United States Championship	Nevada 5◄ Illinois 7 Forfeit; Linescore						
Consolation Game	Nevada 0 Japan 5◄ Linescore						
World Championship Game	South Korea 8◄ Illinois 4 Linescore						

== Double-elimination stage ==
=== United States ===
Upper round 1	Upper round 2	Upper final	Final
August 14 – Game 2
Illinois	12 Forfeit
August 17 – Game 14 (F/4)
(Washington (state)) Washington	2
Illinois	2
August 14 – Game 4 (F/5)
Nevada	13
South Dakota	2
August 20 – Game 24
Nevada	12
Nevada	8
August 15 – Game 6
Pennsylvania	1
Pennsylvania	4
August 17 – Game 16
Tennessee	0
Pennsylvania	7
August 15 – Game 8
Texas	6
Texas	6	August 23 – U.S. championship
Rhode Island	4	Nevada	5
Illinois	7 Forfeit
Lower round 1	Lower round 2	Lower round 3	Lower final
August 18 – Game 18
August 16 – Game 10	Washington	4	August 21 – Game 26
Washington	7	Texas	11	August 19 – Game 22	Pennsylvania	5
South Dakota	5	Texas	1	Illinois	6 Forfeit
August 18 – Game 20	Illinois	6 Forfeit
August 16 – Game 12	Rhode Island	7
Tennessee	7	Illinois	8 Forfeit
Rhode Island	8

==== Winner's bracket ====
===== Game 2: Illinois 12, Washington 2 =====
August 14 3:00 pm EDT Howard J. Lamade Stadium
Team	1	2	3	4	5	6	R	H	E
Illinois ◄	2	3	5	1	1	–	12	13	2
(Washington (state)) Washington	2	0	0	0	0	–	2	2	1
WP: Joshua Houston (1–0) LP: Ian Michael (0–1); Home runs: IL: Pierce Jones 3 (3), Ed Howard (1); WA: None; Notes: Completed early due to mercy rule. Boxscore

===== Game 4: Nevada 12, South Dakota 2 =====
August 14 7:00 pm EDT Howard J. Lamade Stadium
Team	1	2	3	4	5	6	R	H	E
Nevada ◄	1	0	3	4	4	–	12	12	0
South Dakota	0	2	0	0	0	–	2	4	1
WP: Austin Kryszczuk (1–0) LP: Colton Hartford (0–1); Home runs: NV: Zach Hare (1); SD: Blake Weaver (1); Notes: Completed early due to mercy rule. This is the first appearance, as well as the first win, of a team from Nevada at the Little League World Series. Boxscore

===== Game 6: Pennsylvania 4, Tennessee 0 =====
August 15 3:00 pm EDT Howard J. Lamade Stadium
Team	1	2	3	4	5	6	R	H	E
Pennsylvania ◄	3	0	0	0	0	1	4	4	0
Tennessee	0	0	0	0	0	0	0	2	1
WP: Mo'ne Davis (1–0) LP: Blake Money (0–1); Home runs: PA: Jared Sprague-Lott (1); TN: None; Notes: Mo'ne Davis became the first female pitcher to win a game in Little League World Series history. Boxscore

===== Game 8: Texas 6, Rhode Island 4 =====
August 15 8:00 pm EDT Howard J. Lamade Stadium
Team	1	2	3	4	5	6	R	H	E
Texas ◄	2	1	0	0	0	3	6	4	0
Rhode Island	0	0	1	0	0	3	4	9	1
WP: Matthew Adams (1–0) LP: Nick Croteau (0–1) Sv: Landon Donley (1); Home runs: TX: None; RI: Mason Matos (1); Boxscore

===== Game 14: Nevada 13, Illinois 2 =====
August 17 2:00 pm EDT Howard J. Lamade Stadium
Team	1	2	3	4	5	6	R	H	E
Nevada ◄	4	1	3	5	–	–	13	13	1
Illinois	1	1	0	0	–	–	2	2	0
WP: Brennan Holligan (1–0) LP: Brandon Green (0–1); Home runs: NV: Dominic Clayton (1), Zach Hare (2), Austin Kryszczuk 2 (2), Brad Stone (1); IL: None; Notes: Completed early due to mercy rule. Boxscore

===== Game 16: Pennsylvania 7, Texas 6 =====
August 17 7:00 pm EDT Volunteer Stadium
Team	1	2	3	4	5	6	R	H	E
Texas	0	0	1	1	4	0	6	8	3
Pennsylvania ◄	2	0	1	0	2	2	7	9	1
WP: Erik Lipson (1–0) LP: Landon Donley (0–1); Home runs: TX: Cole Smajstrla (1), Layne Roblyer (1); PA: None; Boxscore

===== Game 24: Nevada 8, Pennsylvania 1 =====
August 20 7:30 pm EDT Howard J. Lamade Stadium
Team	1	2	3	4	5	6	R	H	E
Nevada ◄	1	2	0	0	0	5	8	11	0
Pennsylvania	0	0	0	1	0	0	1	4	1
WP: Austin Kryszczuk (2–0) LP: Mo'ne Davis (1–1); Home runs: NV: Dallan Cave (1), Brennan Holligan (1); PA: None; Boxscore

==== Loser's bracket ====
===== Game 10: Washington 7, South Dakota 5 =====
August 16 2:00 pm EDT Howard J. Lamade Stadium
Team	1	2	3	4	5	6	R	H	E
(Washington (state)) Washington ◄	2	0	2	2	1	0	7	11	3
South Dakota	3	0	2	0	0	0	5	7	1
WP: Karsen Tjarneberg (1–0) LP: Daniel Vigoren (0–1) Sv: Ian Michael (1); Home runs: WA: Colton Walsh (1); SD: Matthew Hegre (1); Notes: South Dakota is eliminated. Boxscore

===== Game 12: Rhode Island 8, Tennessee 7 =====
August 16 7:00 pm EDT Howard J. Lamade Stadium
Team	1	2	3	4	5	6	R	H	E
Tennessee	1	0	1	0	0	5	7	10	2
Rhode Island ◄	0	3	0	2	0	3	8	9	1
WP: Trey Thibeault (1–0) LP: Tyler Finley (0–1); Home runs: TN: Robert Hassell III (1), Sam Slaughter 2 (2); RI: Trey Bourque (1), Trey Thibeault (1); Notes: Tennessee is eliminated. Boxscore

===== Game 18: Texas 11, Washington 4 =====
August 18 3:00 pm EDT Howard J. Lamade Stadium
Team	1	2	3	4	5	6	R	H	E
Texas ◄	1	0	3	1	1	5	11	8	1
(Washington (state)) Washington	0	0	0	3	1	0	4	8	0
WP: Landon Donley (1–1) LP: Logan Kruse (0–1); Home runs: TX: Layne Roblyer (2); WA: None; Notes: Washington is eliminated. Boxscore

===== Game 20: Illinois 8, Rhode Island 7 =====
August 18 8:00 pm EDT Howard J. Lamade Stadium
Team	1	2	3	4	5	6	R	H	E
Illinois ◄	1	4	1	0	2	0	8	12	1
Rhode Island	2	0	5	0	0	0	7	10	4
WP: Joshua Houston (2–0) LP: CJ Davock (0–1) Sv: Marquis Jackson (1); Home runs: IL: Trey Hondras (1), Pierce Jones (4); RI: Trey Thibeault (2); Notes: Rhode Island is eliminated. Boxscore

===== Game 22: Illinois 6, Texas 1 =====
August 19 7:30 pm EDT Howard J. Lamade Stadium
Team	1	2	3	4	5	6	R	H	E
Texas	0	0	1	0	0	0	1	4	1
Illinois ◄	3	0	0	3	0	X	6	7	0
WP: Joshua Houston (3–0) LP: Walter Maeker III (0–1); Home runs: TX: None; IL: None; Notes: Texas is eliminated. Boxscore

===== Game 26: Illinois 6, Pennsylvania 5 =====
August 21 7:30 pm EDT Howard J. Lamade Stadium
Team	1	2	3	4	5	6	R	H	E
Pennsylvania	2	0	0	2	1	0	5	5	3
Illinois ◄	4	2	0	0	0	X	6	6	0
WP: Marquis Jackson (1–0) LP: Erik Lipson (1–1) Sv: Cameron Bufford (1); Home runs: PA: Kai Cummings (1); IL: None; Notes: Pennsylvania is eliminated. Boxscore

=== International ===
Upper round 1	Upper round 2	Upper final	Final
August 14 – Game 1
South Korea	10
August 17 – Game 13
Czech Republic	3
South Korea	8
August 14 – Game 3 (F/4)
Puerto Rico	5
Puerto Rico	16
August 26 – Game 20
Australia	3
South Korea	4
August 15 – Game 5
Japan	1
Mexico	4
August 17 – Game 15
Canada	3
Mexico	5
August 15 – Game 7
Japan	9
Venezuela	0	August 23 – International championship
Japan	1	South Korea	12
Japan	3
Lower round 1	Lower round 2	Lower round 3	Lower final
August 18 – Game 17
August 16 – Game 9	Mexico	6	August 21 – Game 25 (F/5)
Czech Republic	1	Australia	2	August 19 – Game 21 (F/5)	Japan	12
Australia	10	Mexico	11	Mexico	1
August 18 – Game 19	Venezuela	2
August 16 – Game 11 (F/5)	Venezuela	2
Canada	0	Puerto Rico	1
Venezuela	10

==== Winner's bracket ====
===== Game 1: South Korea 10, Czech Republic 3 =====
August 14 1:00 pm EDT Volunteer Stadium
Team	1	2	3	4	5	6	R	H	E
Czech Republic	0	0	1	2	0	0	3	3	3
South Korea ◄	0	2	1	5	2	X	10	13	2
WP: Hae Chan Choi (1–0) LP: Patrik Kadrnozka (1–0); Home runs: CZE: None; KOR: Jae Yeong Hwang (1), Ji Ho Park (1); Boxscore

===== Game 3: Puerto Rico 16, Australia 3 =====
August 14 5:00 pm EDT Volunteer Stadium
Team	1	2	3	4	5	6	R	H	E
Australia	0	0	1	2	–	–	3	7	1
Puerto Rico ◄	13	0	3	X	–	–	16	12	2
WP: Joel Santos (1–0) LP: Nicholas Riley (0–1); Home runs: AUS: None; PUR: Abimael Torres (1), Oscar López (1); Notes: Completed early due to mercy rule. Boxscore

===== Game 5: Mexico 4, Canada 3 =====
August 15 1:00 pm EDT Volunteer Stadium
Team	1	2	3	4	5	6	R	H	E
Canada	0	0	1	0	2	0	3	4	2
Mexico ◄	1	0	2	1	0	X	4	6	2
WP: Juan Garza (1–0) LP: Joseph Sinclair (0–1) Sv: Aldair Tellez (1); Home runs: CAN: Rod Betonio (1); MEX: Luis Rodriguez (1); Boxscore

===== Game 7: Japan 1, Venezuela 0 =====
August 15 5:00 pm EDT Volunteer Stadium
Team	1	2	3	4	5	6	R	H	E
Japan ◄	0	0	1	0	0	0	1	8	0
Venezuela	0	0	0	0	0	0	0	1	2
WP: Takuma Takahashi (1–0) LP: Jorge Cabrera (0–1); Home runs: JPN: None; VEN: None; Boxscore

===== Game 13: South Korea 8, Puerto Rico 5 =====
August 17 Noon EDT Volunteer Stadium
Team	1	2	3	4	5	6	R	H	E
South Korea ◄	0	0	1	0	3	4	8	13	2
Puerto Rico	2	1	0	2	0	0	5	7	0
WP: Jae Yeong Hwang (1–0) LP: Emanuel Alicea (0–1); Home runs: KOR: Jae Yeong Hwang (2); PUR: None; Boxscore

===== Game 15: Japan 9, Mexico 5 =====
August 17 5:00 pm EDT Volunteer Stadium
Team	1	2	3	4	5	6	R	H	E
Mexico	2	1	0	2	0	0	5	4	3
Japan ◄	0	3	1	1	4	X	9	12	0
WP: Suguru Kanamori (1–0) LP: Luis Rodriguez (0–1); Home runs: MEX: Juan Garza (1); JPN: None; Boxscore

===== Game 23: South Korea 4, Japan 2 =====
August 20 3:00 pm EDT Howard J. Lamade Stadium
Team	1	2	3	4	5	6	R	H	E
South Korea ◄	0	0	2	0	0	2	4	4	0
Japan	0	0	2	0	0	0	2	6	1
WP: Dong Hyeok Kim (1–0) LP: Suguru Kanamori (1–1) Sv: Jae Yeong Hwang (1); Home runs: KOR: Jae Yeong Hwang (3), Hae Chan Choi (1); JPN: None; Boxscore

==== Loser's bracket ====
===== Game 9: Australia 10, Czech Republic 1 =====
August 16 Noon EDT Volunteer Stadium
Team	1	2	3	4	5	6	R	H	E
Australia ◄	0	1	0	1	5	3	10	16	1
Czech Republic	0	0	0	0	1	0	1	3	1
WP: Callum Schipp (1–0) LP: Marek Krejcirik (0–1); Home runs: AUS: Javier Pelkonen (1); CZE: None; Notes: Czech Republic is eliminated. This is the first win by an Australian team in Little League World Series history. Boxscore

===== Game 11: Venezuela 10, Canada 0 =====
August 16 5:00 pm EDT Volunteer Stadium
Team	1	2	3	4	5	6	R	H	E
Canada	0	0	0	0	0	–	0	2	1
Venezuela ◄	0	0	2	3	5	–	10	11	1
WP: Jose Luis Atencio (1–0) LP: Madjik Mackenzie (0–1); Home runs: CAN: None; VEN: Ronny Medina (1); Notes: Completed early due to mercy rule. Canada is eliminated. Boxscore

===== Game 17: Mexico 6, Australia 2 =====
August 18 1:00 pm EDT Volunteer Stadium
Team	1	2	3	4	5	6	R	H	E
Australia	1	1	0	0	0	0	2	7	1
Mexico ◄	0	0	1	4	1	X	6	10	1
WP: Aldair Tellez (1–0) LP: Callum Johnson (0–1); Home runs: AUS: None; MEX: Erick Vela (1), Ruy Martinez (1); Notes: Australia is eliminated. Boxscore

===== Game 19: Venezuela 2, Puerto Rico 1 =====
August 18 6:00 pm EDT Volunteer Stadium
Team	1	2	3	4	5	6	R	H	E
Venezuela ◄	1	1	0	0	0	0	2	3	0
Puerto Rico	1	0	0	0	0	0	1	2	2
WP: Ronny Medina (1–0) LP: Joel Santos (1–1) Sv: Diomel Bracho (1); Home runs: PUR: Julio Rejon (1); VEN: None; Notes: Puerto Rico is eliminated. Boxscore

===== Game 21: Mexico 11, Venezuela 1 =====
August 19 3:00 pm EDT Howard J. Lamade Stadium
Team	1	2	3	4	5	6	R	H	E
Venezuela	0	0	1	0	0	–	1	4	0
Mexico ◄	3	0	0	5	3	–	11	15	1
WP: Juan Garza (2–0) LP: Jose Luis Atencio (1–1); Home runs: VEN: None; MEX: Juan Garza (2); Notes: Completed early due to mercy rule. Venezuela is eliminated. Boxscore

===== Game 25: Japan 12, Mexico 1 =====
August 21 3:00 pm EDT Howard J. Lamade Stadium
Team	1	2	3	4	5	6	R	H	E
Mexico	1	0	0	0	0	–	1	1	5
Japan ◄	2	1	3	3	3	–	12	10	0
WP: Ren Takeuchi (1–0) LP: Erick Vela (0–1); Home runs: MEX: Juan Garza (3); JPN: Suguru Kanamori 2 (2), Hayato Ueshima (1); Notes: Completed early due to mercy rule. Mexico is eliminated. Boxscore

=== Crossover games ===
==== Game A: South Dakota 5, Czech Republic 3 ====
August 18 Noon EDT Howard J. Lamade Stadium
Team	1	2	3	4	5	6	R	H	E
Czech Republic	1	0	0	0	2	0	3	7	3
South Dakota ◄	0	0	2	0	3	X	5	8	0
WP: Matthew Hegre (1–0) LP: Tomás Oppelt (0–1); Home runs: CZE: Marek Krejcirik (1); SD: None; Notes: This is the first win by a team from South Dakota in Little League World Series history. Boxscore

==== Game B: Tennessee 12, Canada 9 ====
August 19 Noon EDT Howard J. Lamade Stadium
Team	1	2	3	4	5	6	R	H	E
Canada	1	0	1	0	2	5	9	11	1
Tennessee ◄	4	3	1	0	4	X	12	12	1
WP: Drew Byers (1–0) LP: Joshua Matsui (0–1); Home runs: CAN: Madjik Mackenzie (1); TN: Blake Money (1), Sam Slaughter 2 (4); Boxscore

== Single-elimination stage ==
=== International Championship: South Korea 12, Japan 3 ===
August 23 12:30 pm EDT Howard J. Lamade Stadium
Team	1	2	3	4	5	6	R	H	E
South Korea ◄	0	7	0	1	1	3	12	8	1
Japan	0	0	0	1	2	0	3	5	0
WP: Jae Yeong Hwang (2–0) LP: Joichiro Fujimatsu (0–1); Home runs: KOR: Sang Hoon Han (1), Jun Ha Yoo (1); JPN: None; Notes: Japan is eliminated. Boxscore

=== United States Championship: Nevada 5, Illinois 7 ===
August 23 3:30 pm EDT Howard J. Lamade Stadium
Team	1	2	3	4	5	6	R	H	E
Nevada	3	0	0	0	2	0	5	10	1
Illinois ◄	3	1	0	0	3	X	7	6	0
WP: Joshua Houston (4–0) LP: Brennan Holligan (1–1); Home runs: NV: Brad Stone (2); IL: Trey Hondras (2); Notes: Nevada is eliminated. Illinois was stripped of the United States Championship on 2/11/15. Boxscore

=== Consolation Game ===
August 24 10:00 am EDT Howard J. Lamade Stadium
Team	1	2	3	4	5	6	R	H	E
Nevada	0	0	0	0	0	0	0	3	0
Japan ◄	0	1	0	2	2	X	5	12	0
WP: Takuma Takahashi (2–0) LP: Zach Hare (0–1); Home runs: NV: None; JPN: Ren Takeuchi (1), Takuma Takahashi (1); Boxscore

=== World Championship Game ===
August 24 3:00 pm EDT Howard J. Lamade Stadium
Team	1	2	3	4	5	6	R	H	E
South Korea ◄	1	0	1	1	1	4	8	10	1
Illinois	0	0	1	0	0	3	4	6	1
WP: Hae Chan Choi (2–0) LP: Brandon Green (0–2); Home runs: KOR: Dong Wan Sin (1), Hae Chan Choi (2); IL: None; Notes: South Korea wins the Little League World Series. Boxscore
