= Little League Volunteer Stadium =

Baseball stadium in Williamsport, Pennsylvania

- Volunteer Stadium
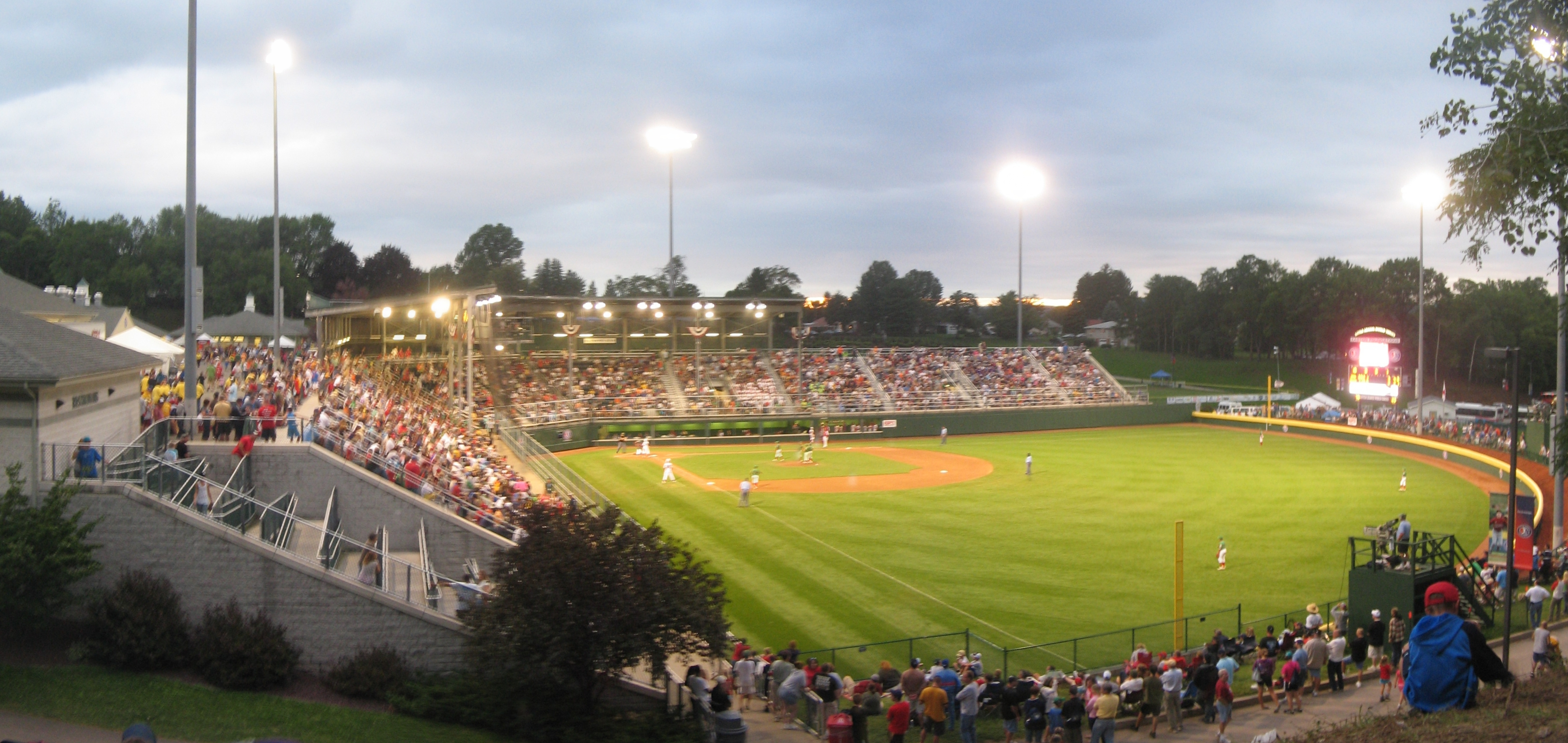
- Volunteer Stadium in the 2010 Little League World Series
- Interactive map of Little League Volunteer Stadium
- Location: South Williamsport, Pennsylvania
- Coordinates: 41.2316°N 76.9804°W
- Capacity: 3,000 (5,000 with standing room)
- Surface: Kentucky Bluegrass
- Scoreboard: Daktronics BA-2026
- Field size: Left Field: 225 ft (69 m); Center Field: 225 ft (69 m); Right Field: 225 ft (69 m)

Construction
- Opened: 2001

Tenant
- Little League World Series

Little League Volunteer Stadium is a baseball stadium in South Williamsport, Pennsylvania, United States. Along with Howard J. Lamade Stadium, it annually hosts the Little League World Series, one of the few sports events where children 12 years old and younger take the center stage.

Volunteer Stadium was built starting in 2000 to accommodate the growth of the Little League World Series, and was completed in 2001. Its seating capacity is 3,000. The stadium is comparable in seating capacity to Lamade Stadium but with far less standing room; the berms surrounding the stadium are much smaller, limiting potential attendance to 5,000 spectators, as opposed to the over 40,000 that can be accommodated at Lamade Stadium. Volunteer Stadium is used for all international games.

In 2006, the home run distance was increased by 20 ft (6.1 m), from 205 ft (62 m) to 225 ft (69 m), to all fields; the outfield wall forms one-fourth of a true circle.

As of 2024, Volunteer Stadium began hosting elimination games.
