= 2018 Little League World Series results =

Children's baseball competition results

The results of the 2018 Little League World Series were determined between August 16 and August 26, 2018 in South Williamsport, Pennsylvania. 16 teams were divided into two groups, one with eight teams from the United States and another with eight international teams, with both groups playing a modified double-elimination tournament. In each group, the last remaining undefeated team faced the last remaining team with one loss, with the winners of those games advancing to play for the Little League World Series championship.

Double-elimination
United States
United States	Winner's bracket						
United States	(Iowa) IA 2 (New York (state)) NY 5◄ Linescore	(Texas) TX 3◄ (Rhode Island) RI 1 Linescore	(Idaho) ID 4 (Michigan) MI 5◄ Linescore	(Georgia (U.S. state)) GA 0 (F/11) (Hawaii) HI 2◄ Linescore	(Texas) TX 1 (New York (state)) NY 2◄ Linescore	(Michigan) MI 3 (Hawaii) HI 8◄ Linescore	(New York (state)) NY 0 (F/5) (Hawaii) HI 10◄ Linescore
United States	Loser's bracket						
United States	(Iowa) IA 9◄ (Rhode Island) RI 5 Linescore	(Georgia (U.S. state)) GA 3◄ (Idaho) ID 0 Linescore	(Iowa) IA 4 (Michigan) MI 5◄ Linescore	(Texas) TX 6 (F/9) (Georgia (U.S. state)) GA 7◄ Linescore	(Michigan) MI 3 (Georgia (U.S. state)) GA 4◄ Linescore	(New York (state)) NY 3 (Georgia (U.S. state)) GA 7◄ Linescore	
International
International	Winner's bracket						
International	(South Korea) KOR 4◄ (Puerto Rico) PUR 2 (F/9); Linescore	(Australia) AUS 2 (Mexico) MEX 3◄ Linescore	(Spain) ESP 1 (F/5) (Japan) JPN 11◄ Linescore	(Panama) PAN 8◄ (Canada) CAN 3 Linescore	KOR 5◄ MEX 1 Linescore	PAN 2 JPN 4◄ Linescore	JPN 0 (F/4); KOR 10◄ Linescore
International	Loser's bracket						
International	PUR 6◄ AUS 0 Linescore	ESP 1 (F/10); CAN 2◄ Linescore	PAN 1 PUR 3◄ Linescore	CAN 6◄ MEX 4 Linescore	PUR 9◄ CAN 4 Linescore	JPN 1◄ PUR 0 Linescore	
Consolation games	Rhode Island 15◄ Australia 0 (F/4); Linescore				Idaho 5◄ Spain 0 Linescore		
Single-elimination
International championship	Japan 1 South Korea 2◄ Linescore						
United States championship	Georgia 0 Hawaii 3◄ Linescore						
Third place game	Georgia 2 Japan 8◄ Linescore						
World championship game	South Korea 0 Hawaii 3◄ Linescore						

== Double-elimination stage ==
=== United States ===
Upper round 1	Upper round 2	Upper final	Final
August 16 – Game 2
(New York (state)) New York	5
August 19 – Game 14
Iowa	2
New York	2
August 16 – Game 4
Texas	1
Rhode Island	1
August 22 – Game 24 (F/5)
Texas	3
New York	0
August 17 – Game 6
Hawaii	10
Michigan	5
August 19 – Game 16
Idaho	4
Michigan	3
August 17 – Game 8 (F/11)
Hawaii	8
(Georgia (U.S. state)) Georgia	0	August 25 – U.S. championship
Hawaii	2	Hawaii	3
Georgia	0
Lower round 1	Lower round 2	Lower round 3	Lower final
August 20 – Game 18
August 18 – Game 10	Michigan	5	August 23 – Game 26
Iowa	9	Iowa	4	August 22 – Game 22	New York	3
Rhode Island	5	Michigan	3	Georgia	7
August 20 – Game 20 (F/9)	Georgia	4
August 18 – Game 12	Texas	6
Idaho	0	Georgia	7
Georgia	3

==== Winner's bracket ====
===== Game 2: New York 5, Iowa 2 =====
August 16 3:00 pm EDT Howard J. Lamade Stadium
Team	1	2	3	4	5	6	R	H	E
Iowa	0	0	2	0	0	0	2	4	3
New York ◄	1	0	1	2	1	X	5	5	0
WP: Gregory Bruno (1–0) LP: Brody Watson (0–1) Sv: Derek Mendez (1); Boxscore

===== Game 4: Texas 3, Rhode Island 1 =====
August 16 7:00 pm EDT Howard J. Lamade Stadium
Team	1	2	3	4	5	6	R	H	E
Texas ◄	0	0	2	0	0	1	3	6	1
Rhode Island	1	0	0	0	0	0	1	2	1
WP: Carter Pitts (1–0) LP: Tommy Turner (0–1) Sv: Ryan Selvaggi (1); Boxscore

===== Game 6: Michigan 5, Idaho 4 =====
August 17 4:00 pm EDT Howard J. Lamade Stadium
Team	1	2	3	4	5	6	R	H	E
Idaho	0	3	1	0	0	0	4	6	3
Michigan ◄	0	0	0	0	1	4	5	8	2
WP: Preston Barr (1–0) LP: Braeden Newby (0–1); Boxscore

===== Game 8: Hawaii 2, Georgia 0 =====
August 17 8:00 pm EDT Howard J. Lamade Stadium
Team	1	2	3	4	5	6	7	8	9	10	11	R	H	E
Georgia	0	0	0	0	0	0	0	0	0	0	0	0	4	2
Hawaii ◄	0	0	0	0	0	0	0	0	0	0	2	2	8	0
WP: Sean Yamaguchi (1–0) LP: Ben Traxler (0–1); Home runs: GA: None; HI: Aukai Kea (1); Boxscore

===== Game 14: New York 2, Texas 1 =====
August 19 11:00 am EDT Howard J. Lamade Stadium
Team	1	2	3	4	5	6	R	H	E
Texas	0	0	0	1	0	0	1	3	0
New York ◄	0	0	2	0	0	X	2	3	0
WP: Gregory Bruno (2–0) LP: Ryan Selvaggi (0–1) Sv: Chris Bedford (1); Boxscore

===== Game 16: Hawaii 8, Michigan 3 =====
August 19 2:00 pm EDT Howard J. Lamade Stadium
Team	1	2	3	4	5	6	R	H	E
Michigan	1	0	0	0	0	2	3	5	3
Hawaii ◄	0	6	2	0	0	X	8	5	2
WP: Ka'olu Holt (1–0) LP: Ryan Knaebel (0–1); Boxscore

===== Game 24: Hawaii 10, New York 0 =====
August 22 7:30 pm EDT Howard J. Lamade Stadium
Team	1	2	3	4	5	6	R	H	E
New York	0	0	0	0	0	–	0	1	3
Hawaii ◄	2	5	2	0	1	–	10	7	0
WP: Aukai Kea (1–0) LP: Chris Bedford (0–1); Home runs: NY: None; HI: Sean Yamaguchi (1); Notes: Completed early due to the run rule. Boxscore

==== Loser's bracket ====
===== Game 10: Iowa 9, Rhode Island 5 =====
August 18 3:00 pm EDT Howard J. Lamade Stadium
Team	1	2	3	4	5	6	R	H	E
Iowa ◄	2	0	2	4	0	1	9	8	2
Rhode Island	0	0	5	0	0	0	5	6	2
WP: Blake Larson (1–0) LP: Logan Lama (0–1); Notes: Rhode Island is eliminated. Boxscore

===== Game 12: Georgia 3, Idaho 0 =====
August 18 8:00 pm EDT Howard J. Lamade Stadium
Team	1	2	3	4	5	6	R	H	E
Georgia ◄	0	1	1	0	0	1	3	10	0
Idaho	0	0	0	0	0	0	0	3	2
WP: Tai Peete (1–0) LP: Braeden Newby (0–2); Notes: Idaho is eliminated. Boxscore

===== Game 18: Michigan 5, Iowa 4 =====
August 20 3:00 pm EDT Howard J. Lamade Stadium
Team	1	2	3	4	5	6	R	H	E
Iowa	3	0	1	0	0	0	4	6	2
Michigan ◄	0	0	0	1	3	1	5	7	3
WP: Preston Barr (2–0) LP: Connor Duong (0–1); Notes: Iowa is eliminated. Boxscore

===== Game 20: Georgia 7, Texas 6 =====
August 20 8:00 pm EDT Howard J. Lamade Stadium
Team	1	2	3	4	5	6	7	8	9	R	H	E
Texas	0	1	1	0	2	1	0	1	0	6	9	3
Georgia ◄	0	0	0	0	2	3	0	1	1	7	10	3
WP: Ben Traxler (1–1) LP: Richie Klosek (0–1); Home runs: TX: Ryan Selvaggi (1); GA: Jansen Kenty (1); Notes: Texas is eliminated. Boxscore

===== Game 22: Georgia 4, Michigan 3 =====
August 22 3:00 pm EDT Howard J. Lamade Stadium
Team	1	2	3	4	5	6	R	H	E
Michigan	0	2	1	0	0	0	3	4	1
Georgia ◄	2	2	0	0	0	X	4	6	0
WP: Jansen Kenty (1–0) LP: Brennan Hill (0–1); Home runs: MI: Jarren Purify (1), Oliver Service (1); GA: None; Notes: Michigan is eliminated. Boxscore

===== Game 26: Georgia 7, New York 3 =====
August 23 7:00 pm EDT Howard J. Lamade Stadium
Team	1	2	3	4	5	6	R	H	E
New York	3	0	0	0	0	0	3	7	2
Georgia ◄	2	2	2	1	0	X	7	8	0
WP: Tai Peete (2–0) LP: Derek Mendez (0–1) Sv: Ben Traxler (1); Notes: New York is eliminated. Boxscore

=== International ===
Upper round 1	Upper round 2	Upper final	Final
August 16 – Game 1 (F/9)
Puerto Rico	2
August 19 – Game 13
South Korea	4
South Korea	5
August 16 – Game 3
Mexico	1
Mexico	3
August 22 – Game 23 (F/4)
Australia	2
South Korea	10
August 17 – Game 5 (F/5)
Japan	0
Spain	1
August 19 – Game 15
Japan	11
Japan	4
August 17 – Game 7
Panama	2
Panama	8	August 25 – International championship
Canada	3	South Korea	2
Japan	1
Lower round 1	Lower round 2	Lower round 3	Lower final
August 20 – Game 17
August 18 – Game 9	Panama	1	August 23 – Game 25
Puerto Rico	6	Puerto Rico	3	August 22 – Game 21	Japan	1
Australia	0	Puerto Rico	9	Puerto Rico	0
August 20 – Game 19	Canada	4
August 18 – Game 11 (F/10)	Mexico	4
Spain	1	Canada	6
Canada	2

==== Winner's bracket ====
===== Game 1: South Korea 4, Puerto Rico 2 =====
August 16 1:00 pm EDT Volunteer Stadium
Team	1	2	3	4	5	6	7	8	9	R	H	E
South Korea ◄	0	0	0	0	0	2	0	0	2	4	6	0
Puerto Rico	0	0	0	2	0	0	0	0	0	2	4	1
WP: Ji-Hyung Choi (1–0) LP: Victor Cartagena (0–1) Sv: Jun-Woo Lim (1); Boxscore

===== Game 3: Mexico 3, Australia 2 =====
August 16 5:00 pm EDT Volunteer Stadium
Team	1	2	3	4	5	6	R	H	E
Australia	2	0	0	0	0	0	2	2	1
Mexico ◄	1	0	0	0	0	2	3	6	1
WP: Alberto Gomez (1–0) LP: Jake Calver (0–1); Home runs: AUS: Oscar Hyde (1); MEX: None; Boxscore

===== Game 5: Japan 11, Spain 1 =====
August 17 2:00 pm EDT Volunteer Stadium
Team	1	2	3	4	5	6	R	H	E
Spain	1	0	0	0	0	–	1	5	4
Japan ◄	0	1	0	2	8	–	11	14	0
WP: Shisei Fujimoto (1–0) LP: Juan Salazar (0–1); Notes: Completed early due to the run rule. Boxscore

===== Game 7: Panama 8, Canada 3 =====
August 17 7:10 pm EDT Volunteer Stadium
Team	1	2	3	4	5	6	R	H	E
Panama ◄	3	3	0	0	0	2	8	9	0
Canada	1	0	0	0	0	2	3	5	1
WP: Brian Villarreal (1–0) LP: Ian Huang (0–1); Home runs: PAN: Adan Sanchez (1); CAN: None; Boxscore

===== Game 13: South Korea 5, Mexico 1 =====
August 19 9:00 am EDT Volunteer Stadium
Team	1	2	3	4	5	6	R	H	E
South Korea ◄	1	0	0	2	0	2	5	5	1
Mexico	0	0	0	1	0	0	1	3	2
WP: Shoo-Hoo Choi (1–0) LP: Alberto Gomez (1–1); Home runs: KOR: Ji-Hyung Choi (1); MEX: None; Boxscore

===== Game 15: Japan 4, Panama 2 =====
August 19 1:00 pm EDT Volunteer Stadium
Team	1	2	3	4	5	6	R	H	E
Panama	0	0	0	2	0	0	2	2	1
Japan ◄	2	1	0	0	1	X	4	4	0
WP: Shinji Furusawa (1–0) LP: Adan Sanchez (0–1); Home runs: PAN: None; JPN: Shisei Fujimoto (1); Boxscore

===== Game 23: South Korea 10, Japan 0 =====
August 22 7:30 pm EDT Volunteer Stadium
Team	1	2	3	4	5	6	R	H	E
Japan	0	0	0	0	–	–	0	1	0
South Korea ◄	4	2	0	4	–	–	10	11	0
WP: Yeong-Hyeon Kim (1–0) LP: Shisei Fujimoto (1–1); Home runs: JPN: None; KOR: Ji-Hyung Choi (2); Notes: Completed early due to the run rule. Boxscore

==== Loser's bracket ====
===== Game 9: Puerto Rico 6, Australia 0 =====
August 18 2:30 pm EDT Volunteer Stadium
Team	1	2	3	4	5	6	R	H	E
Puerto Rico ◄	0	0	3	1	0	2	6	7	1
Australia	0	0	0	0	0	0	0	1	2
WP: Yadiel Delgado (1–0) LP: Matthew White (0–1) Sv: Luis Diaz (1); Home runs: PUR: Eric Rodriguez (1); AUS: None; Notes: Australia is eliminated. Boxscore

===== Game 11: Canada 2, Spain 1 =====
August 18 6:00 pm EDT Volunteer Stadium
Team	1	2	3	4	5	6	7	8	9	10	R	H	E
Spain	0	0	0	0	0	1	0	0	0	0	1	5	1
Canada ◄	1	0	0	0	0	0	0	0	0	1	2	9	2
WP: Cole Balkovec (1–0) LP: Toni Cortes (0–1); Home runs: ESP: Lucas Iriarte (1); CAN: None; Notes: Spain is eliminated. Boxscore

===== Game 17: Puerto Rico 3, Panama 1 =====
August 20 1:00 pm EDT Volunteer Stadium
Team	1	2	3	4	5	6	R	H	E
Panama	1	0	0	0	0	0	1	1	0
Puerto Rico ◄	0	0	0	1	2	X	3	3	1
WP: Roberto Joubert (1–0) LP: Arod McKenzie (0–1) Sv: John Lopez (1); Notes: Panama is eliminated. Boxscore

===== Game 19: Canada 6, Mexico 4 =====
August 20 6:00 pm EDT Volunteer Stadium
Team	1	2	3	4	5	6	R	H	E
Canada ◄	2	3	1	0	0	0	6	10	1
Mexico	0	1	3	0	0	0	4	5	0
WP: Ian Huang (1–1) LP: Angel Martinez (0–1) Sv: Nate Colina (1); Home runs: CAN: None; MEX: Fernando Lopez (1); Notes: Mexico is eliminated. Boxscore

===== Game 21: Puerto Rico 9, Canada 4 =====
August 22 3:00 pm EDT Volunteer Stadium
Team	1	2	3	4	5	6	R	H	E
Puerto Rico ◄	1	0	4	2	0	2	9	9	3
Canada	1	1	2	0	0	0	4	5	1
WP: Eric Rodriguez (1–0) LP: Jordan Jaramillo (0–1); Home runs: PUR: Carlos De Jesus 2 (2); CAN: None; Notes: Canada is eliminated. Boxscore

===== Game 25: Japan 1, Puerto Rico 0 =====
August 23 3:00 pm EDT Howard J. Lamade Stadium
Team	1	2	3	4	5	6	R	H	E
Japan ◄	0	0	1	0	0	0	1	3	0
Puerto Rico	0	0	0	0	0	0	0	3	1
WP: Masato Igarashi (1–0) LP: John Lopez (0–1) Sv: Shisei Fujimoto (1); Notes: Puerto Rico is eliminated. Boxscore

=== Consolation games ===
==== Game A: Rhode Island 15, Australia 0 ====
August 20 11:00 am EDT Howard J. Lamade Stadium
Team	1	2	3	4	5	6	R	H	E
Rhode Island ◄	1	5	0	9	–	–	15	10	1
Australia	0	0	0	0	–	–	0	3	5
WP: Will Owens (1–0) LP: Jake Calver (0–2); Notes: Completed early due to the run rule. Boxscore

==== Game B: Idaho 5, Spain 0 ====
August 23 11:00 am EDT Howard J. Lamade Stadium
Team	1	2	3	4	5	6	R	H	E
Idaho ◄	0	0	0	3	2	0	5	8	1
Spain	0	0	0	0	0	0	0	3	1
WP: Christopher Reynolds (1–0) LP: Juan Salazar (0–2); Boxscore

== Single-elimination stage ==
=== International championship: South Korea 2, Japan 1 ===
August 25 12:30 pm EDT Howard J. Lamade Stadium
Team	1	2	3	4	5	6	R	H	E
Japan	0	0	0	0	1	0	1	5	1
South Korea ◄	2	0	0	0	0	X	2	3	0
WP: Ji-Hyung Choi (2–0) LP: Shisei Fujimoto (1–2) Sv: Yeong-Hyeon Kim (1); Home runs: JPN: None; KOR: Ji-Hyung Choi (3); Notes: Japan is eliminated. Boxscore

=== United States championship: Hawaii 3, Georgia 0 ===
August 25 3:30 pm EDT Howard J. Lamade Stadium
Team	1	2	3	4	5	6	R	H	E
Georgia	0	0	0	0	0	0	0	3	1
Hawaii ◄	0	0	0	1	2	X	3	6	0
WP: Aukai Kea (2–0) LP: Connor Riggs-Soper (0–1); Notes: Georgia is eliminated. Boxscore

=== Third place game: Japan 8, Georgia 2 ===
August 26 10:00 am EDT Howard J. Lamade Stadium
Team	1	2	3	4	5	6	R	H	E
Georgia	0	0	0	0	2	0	2	6	2
Japan ◄	0	7	0	1	0	X	8	9	1
WP: Masato Igarashi (2–0) LP: Chase Fralick (0–1); Home runs: GA: None; JPN: Masato Igarashi (1); Boxscore

=== World championship game: Hawaii 3, South Korea 0 ===
August 26 3:00 pm EDT Howard J. Lamade Stadium
Team	1	2	3	4	5	6	R	H	E
South Korea	0	0	0	0	0	0	0	2	1
Hawaii ◄	1	0	2	0	0	X	3	7	0
WP: Ka'olu Holt (2–0) LP: Yeong-Hyeon Kim (1–1); Home runs: KOR: None; HI: Mana Lau Kong (1); Boxscore
