= 2009 Little League World Series results =

Children's baseball competition results

The results of the 2009 Little League World Series were determined between August 21 and August 30, 2009 in South Williamsport, Pennsylvania. 16 teams were divided into four groups, two with four teams from the United States and two with four international teams each, playing in a round robin format. In each group, the top two teams advanced to the knockout stage. The last remaining team from the United States faced the last remaining international team for the Little League World Series Championship.

Pool play
| Pool A | (New York (state)) NY 10◄ (Washington (state)) WA 2 Linescore | (Georgia (U.S. state)) GA 11◄ (Iowa) IA 3 Linescore | (Georgia (U.S. state)) GA 6◄ (New York (state)) NY 3 Linescore | (Washington (state)) WA 3 (Iowa) IA 5◄ Linescore | (Georgia (U.S. state)) GA 3◄ (Washington (state)) WA 2 Linescore | (New York (state)) NY 8◄ (Iowa) IA 3 Linescore |
| Pool B | (Massachusetts) MA 1 (Texas) TX 10◄ Linescore | (Kentucky) KY 0 (F/5) (California) CA 15◄ Linescore | (Kentucky) KY 0 (F/4) (Texas) TX 12◄ Linescore | (California) CA 14◄ (Massachusetts) MA 0 Linescore | (Kentucky) KY 3 (Massachusetts) MA 12◄ Linescore | (Texas) TX 6◄ (California) CA 3 Linescore |
| Pool C | (Venezuela) VEN 1 (Curaçao) CUR 2◄ Linescore | (Saudi Arabia) SAU 2 (Japan) JPN 5◄ Linescore | (Japan) JPN 11 (Curaçao) CUR 12◄ Linescore | (Venezuela) VEN 4 (Japan) JPN 5◄ Linescore | (Saudi Arabia) SAU 3 (Curaçao) CUR 5◄ Linescore | (Venezuela) VEN 3 (Saudi Arabia) SAU 5◄ Linescore |
| Pool D | (Taiwan) TWN 16◄ (Germany) GER 0 (F/4); Linescore | (Canada) CAN 1 (F/7) (Mexico) MEX 2◄ Linescore | (Canada) CAN 0 (Taiwan) TWN 8◄ Linescore | (Mexico) MEX 13◄ (Germany) GER 0 (F/4); Linescore | (Canada) CAN 14◄ (Germany) GER 13; Linescore | (Mexico) MEX 3◄ (Taiwan) TWN 2 Linescore |
Elimination round
| Semifinals | Japan 0 Mexico 6◄ Linescore | | | (New York (state)) New York 1 Texas 4◄ Linescore | | |
| Semifinals | Taiwan 5◄ Curaçao 2 Linescore | | | (Georgia (U.S. state)) Georgia 10; California 11◄ Linescore | | |
| Finals | Taiwan 9◄ Mexico 4 Linescore | | | Texas 2 (F/4); California 12◄ Linescore | | |
| Consolation Game | Mexico 5◄ (Texas) Southwest 4 Linescore | | | | | |
| Championship Game | Taiwan 3 California 6◄ Linescore | | | | | |

== Pool Play ==
=== Pool A ===
| Rank | Region | Record | Runs Allowed | Defensive Innings | Run Ratio |
|---|---|---|---|---|---|
| 1 | (Georgia (U.S. state)) Georgia | 3–0 | 8 | 18 | 0.444 |
| 2 | (New York (state)) New York | 2–1 | 11 | 18 | 0.611 |
| 3 | Iowa | 1–2 | 22 | 18 | 1.222 |
| 4 | (Washington (state)) Washington | 0–3 | 18 | 18 | 1.000 |

==== New York 10, Washington 2 ====
August 21 1:00 pm EDT Volunteer Stadium
| Team | 1 | 2 | 3 | 4 | 5 | 6 | R | H | E |
|---|---|---|---|---|---|---|---|---|---|
| (New York (state)) New York ◄ | 0 | 0 | 3 | 4 | 3 | 0 | 10 | 11 | 2 |
| (Washington (state)) Washington | 0 | 0 | 0 | 0 | 1 | 1 | 2 | 7 | 1 |
WP: Angelo Navetta (1–0) LP: William Mansfield (0–1); Home runs: NY: Nick Pucciarelli (1); WA: None; Boxscore

==== Georgia 11, Iowa 3 ====
August 21 5:00 pm EDT Volunteer Stadium
| Team | 1 | 2 | 3 | 4 | 5 | 6 | R | H | E |
|---|---|---|---|---|---|---|---|---|---|
| (Georgia (U.S. state)) Georgia ◄ | 1 | 0 | 3 | 1 | 0 | 6 | 11 | 13 | 3 |
| Iowa | 2 | 0 | 0 | 1 | 0 | 0 | 3 | 3 | 2 |
WP: Conner Smith (1–0) LP: Trae Cropp (0–1); Home runs: GA: Justin Jones 2 (2), Trey Maddox (1), Spencer Sato (1); IA: None; Boxscore

==== Georgia 6, New York 3 ====
August 22 3:00 pm EDT Lamade Stadium
| Team | 1 | 2 | 3 | 4 | 5 | 6 | R | H | E |
|---|---|---|---|---|---|---|---|---|---|
| (Georgia (U.S. state)) Georgia ◄ | 2 | 2 | 0 | 0 | 0 | 2 | 6 | 7 | 1 |
| (New York (state)) New York | 0 | 1 | 0 | 0 | 0 | 2 | 3 | 3 | 0 |
WP: Justin Jones (1–0) LP: Vincent Quinn (0–1); Home runs: GA: Spencer Sato (2), Justin Jones (3), Blake Jackson (1); NY: Vincent Quinn (1); Boxscore

==== Iowa 5, Washington 3 ====
August 23 Noon EDT Volunteer Stadium
| Team | 1 | 2 | 3 | 4 | 5 | 6 | R | H | E |
|---|---|---|---|---|---|---|---|---|---|
| (Washington (state)) Washington | 0 | 0 | 2 | 0 | 1 | 0 | 3 | 4 | 0 |
| Iowa ◄ | 0 | 0 | 0 | 0 | 5 | X | 5 | 5 | 0 |
WP: Brody Egger (1–0) LP: Keegan Ogard (0–1) Sv: Cole Scieszinski (1); Home runs: WA: None; IA: Jake Quirk (1); Boxscore

==== Georgia 3, Washington 2 ====
August 24 4:00 pm EDT Lamade Stadium
| Team | 1 | 2 | 3 | 4 | 5 | 6 | R | H | E |
|---|---|---|---|---|---|---|---|---|---|
| (Georgia (U.S. state)) Georgia ◄ | 0 | 1 | 0 | 0 | 0 | 2 | 3 | 8 | 0 |
| (Washington (state)) Washington | 0 | 2 | 0 | 0 | 0 | 0 | 2 | 2 | 3 |
WP: Hunter Phillips (1–0) LP: Brandon Lawler (0–1) Sv: Cortez Broughton (1); Home runs: GA: None; WA: None; Boxscore

==== New York 8, Iowa 3 ====
August 24 8:00 pm EDT Lamade Stadium
| Team | 1 | 2 | 3 | 4 | 5 | 6 | R | H | E |
|---|---|---|---|---|---|---|---|---|---|
| (New York (state)) New York ◄ | 1 | 0 | 1 | 0 | 2 | 4 | 8 | 11 | 0 |
| Iowa | 0 | 0 | 0 | 0 | 0 | 3 | 3 | 5 | 3 |
WP: Michael Rapaglia (1–0) LP: Trae Cropp (0–2); Home runs: NY: Angelo Navetta (1), Vincent Quinn (2); IA: Trae Cropp (1); Boxscore

=== Pool B ===
| Rank | Region | Record | Runs Allowed | Defensive Innings | Run Ratio |
|---|---|---|---|---|---|
| 1 | Texas | 3–0 | 4 | 16 | 0.250 |
| 2 | California | 2–1 | 6 | 17 | 0.353 |
| 3 | Massachusetts | 1–2 | 27 | 17 | 1.588 |
| 4 | Kentucky | 0–3 | 39 | 13 | 3.000 |

==== Texas 10, Massachusetts 1 ====
August 21 8:00 pm EDT Lamade Stadium
| Team | 1 | 2 | 3 | 4 | 5 | 6 | R | H | E |
|---|---|---|---|---|---|---|---|---|---|
| Massachusetts | 0 | 0 | 0 | 1 | 0 | 0 | 1 | 3 | 3 |
| Texas ◄ | 0 | 0 | 4 | 6 | 0 | X | 10 | 8 | 1 |
WP: Travis Daves (1–0) LP: Austin Batchelor (0–1); Home runs: MA: None; TX: Jacob Ramos (1); Boxscore

==== California 15, Kentucky 0 ====
August 22 8:00 pm EDT Lamade Stadium
| Team | 1 | 2 | 3 | 4 | 5 | 6 | R | H | E |
|---|---|---|---|---|---|---|---|---|---|
| California ◄ | 2 | 0 | 1 | 5 | 7 | – | 15 | 17 | 0 |
| Kentucky | 0 | 0 | 0 | 0 | 0 | – | 0 | 1 | 1 |
WP: Kiko Garcia (1–0) LP: Barrett Croslin (0–1); Home runs: CA: Luke Ramirez 2 (2), Bradley Roberto (1), Isaiah Armenta (1), Seth Godfrey (1), Andy Rios (1), Kiko Garcia (1); KY: None; Notes: Completed early due to mercy rule. Boxscore

==== Texas 12, Kentucky 0 ====
August 23 2:00 pm EDT Volunteer Stadium
| Team | 1 | 2 | 3 | 4 | 5 | 6 | R | H | E |
|---|---|---|---|---|---|---|---|---|---|
| Kentucky | 0 | 0 | 0 | 0 | – | – | 0 | 2 | 1 |
| Texas ◄ | 0 | 0 | 12 | X | – | – | 12 | 8 | 1 |
WP: John Shull (1–0) LP: Ian Woodall (0–1); Home runs: KY: None; TX: Nicholas Smisek (1), Steven Cardone (1); Notes: Completed early due to mercy rule. Boxscore

==== California 14, Massachusetts 0 ====
August 23 6:00 pm EDT Volunteer Stadium
| Team | 1 | 2 | 3 | 4 | 5 | 6 | R | H | E |
|---|---|---|---|---|---|---|---|---|---|
| California ◄ | 0 | 1 | 0 | 0 | 1 | 12 | 14 | 15 | 1 |
| Massachusetts | 0 | 0 | 0 | 0 | 0 | 0 | 0 | 6 | 2 |
WP: Luke Ramirez (1–0) LP: Matt Hosman (0–1); Home runs: CA: Seth Godfrey (2), Andy Rios 2 (3); MA: None; Boxscore

==== Massachusetts 12, Kentucky 3 ====
August 25 4:00 pm EDT Lamade Stadium
| Team | 1 | 2 | 3 | 4 | 5 | 6 | R | H | E |
|---|---|---|---|---|---|---|---|---|---|
| Kentucky | 1 | 0 | 0 | 2 | 0 | 0 | 3 | 6 | 2 |
| Massachusetts ◄ | 0 | 1 | 9 | 0 | 2 | X | 12 | 13 | 2 |
WP: Austin Batchelor (1–1) LP: Barrett Croslin (0–2); Home runs: KY: None; MA: Austin Batchelor (1); Boxscore

==== Texas 6, California 3 ====
August 25 8:00 pm EDT Lamade Stadium
| Team | 1 | 2 | 3 | 4 | 5 | 6 | R | H | E |
|---|---|---|---|---|---|---|---|---|---|
| Texas ◄ | 0 | 0 | 4 | 0 | 0 | 2 | 6 | 8 | 1 |
| California | 2 | 0 | 0 | 1 | 0 | 0 | 3 | 7 | 0 |
WP: Troy Montemayor (1–0) LP: Seth Godfrey (0–1) Sv: Kyle Pollard (1); Home runs: TX: Travis Daves (1), Wyatt Willis (1); CA: Kiko Garcia (2); Boxscore

=== Pool C ===
| Rank | Region | Record | Runs Allowed | Defensive Innings | Run Ratio |
|---|---|---|---|---|---|
| 1 | Curaçao | 3–0 | 15 | 18 | 0.833 |
| 2 | Japan | 2–1 | 18 | 18 | 1.000 |
| 3 | Saudi Arabia | 1–2 | 13 | 16 | 0.813 |
| 4 | Venezuela | 0–3 | 12 | 16 | 0.750 |

==== Curaçao 2, Venezuela 1 ====
August 22 1:00 pm EDT Volunteer Stadium
| Team | 1 | 2 | 3 | 4 | 5 | 6 | R | H | E |
|---|---|---|---|---|---|---|---|---|---|
| Venezuela | 0 | 0 | 0 | 1 | 0 | 0 | 1 | 2 | 0 |
| Curaçao ◄ | 0 | 1 | 0 | 1 | 0 | X | 2 | 2 | 1 |
WP: Claycandy Hariquez (1–0) LP: José Martínez (0–1); Home runs: CUR: None; VEN: None; Boxscore

==== Japan 5, Saudi Arabia 2 ====
August 22 6:00 pm EDT Volunteer Stadium
| Team | 1 | 2 | 3 | 4 | 5 | 6 | R | H | E |
|---|---|---|---|---|---|---|---|---|---|
| Saudi Arabia | 0 | 0 | 2 | 0 | 0 | 0 | 2 | 4 | 2 |
| Japan ◄ | 2 | 0 | 2 | 1 | 0 | X | 5 | 3 | 0 |
WP: Toshinori Wakai (1–0) LP: John Sheppard (0–1); Home runs: SAU: None; JPN: Daisuke Yamaga (1), Toshinori Wakai (1); Boxscore

==== Curaçao 12, Japan 11 ====
August 23 8:00 pm EDT Lamade Stadium
| Team | 1 | 2 | 3 | 4 | 5 | 6 | R | H | E |
|---|---|---|---|---|---|---|---|---|---|
| Japan | 5 | 2 | 0 | 2 | 1 | 1 | 11 | 5 | 3 |
| Curaçao ◄ | 4 | 3 | 0 | 2 | 1 | 2 | 12 | 15 | 6 |
WP: Jardel Martina (1–0) LP: Daisuke Yamaga (0–1); Home runs: JPN: Motoki Takashima (1); CUR: Richendly Bicentini (1), Shaïr Lacrus (1); Boxscore

==== Japan 5, Venezuela 4 ====
August 24 2:00 pm EDT Volunteer Stadium
| Team | 1 | 2 | 3 | 4 | 5 | 6 | R | H | E |
|---|---|---|---|---|---|---|---|---|---|
| Venezuela | 0 | 0 | 0 | 2 | 2 | 0 | 4 | 8 | 5 |
| Japan ◄ | 0 | 3 | 1 | 0 | 0 | 1 | 5 | 7 | 0 |
WP: Motoki Takashima (1–0) LP: Mikey Edie (0–1); Home runs: VEN: Oberto Muñoz (1); JPN: Jun Magoyama 2 (2); Boxscore

==== Curaçao 5, Saudi Arabia 3 ====
August 24 6:00 pm EDT Volunteer Stadium
| Team | 1 | 2 | 3 | 4 | 5 | 6 | R | H | E |
|---|---|---|---|---|---|---|---|---|---|
| Saudi Arabia | 0 | 0 | 0 | 3 | 0 | 0 | 3 | 3 | 1 |
| Curaçao ◄ | 2 | 1 | 0 | 0 | 2 | X | 5 | 5 | 3 |
WP: Jardel Martina (2–0) LP: Alex Husain (0–1) Sv: Jayson Libert (1); Home runs: SAU: None; CUR: Junters Dossett (1); Boxscore

==== Saudi Arabia 5, Venezuela 3 ====
August 25 Noon EDT Lamade Stadium
| Team | 1 | 2 | 3 | 4 | 5 | 6 | R | H | E |
|---|---|---|---|---|---|---|---|---|---|
| Venezuela | 1 | 1 | 1 | 0 | 0 | 0 | 3 | 5 | 1 |
| Saudi Arabia ◄ | 5 | 0 | 0 | 0 | 0 | X | 5 | 1 | 4 |
WP: Cameron Durley (1–0) LP: Giorgio Pineda (0–1) Sv: John Sheppard (1); Home runs: VEN: None; SAU: None; Boxscore

=== Pool D ===
| Rank | Region | Record | Runs Allowed | Defensive Innings | Run Ratio |
|---|---|---|---|---|---|
| 1 | Mexico | 3–0 | 3 | 17 | 0.176 |
| 2 | Taiwan | 2–1 | 3 | 16 | 0.188 |
| 3 | Canada | 1–2 | 23 | 18 | 1.278 |
| 4 | Germany | 0–3 | 43 | 14 | 3.071 |

==== Taiwan 16, Germany 0 ====
August 21 3:00 pm EDT Lamade Stadium
| Team | 1 | 2 | 3 | 4 | 5 | 6 | R | H | E |
|---|---|---|---|---|---|---|---|---|---|
| Taiwan ◄ | 6 | 6 | 1 | 3 | – | – | 16 | 11 | 0 |
| Germany | 0 | 0 | 0 | 0 | – | – | 0 | 0 | 6 |
WP: Wen Hua Sung (1–0) LP: Cannon Byrd (0–1); Home runs: TPE: Yu Chieh Kao (1), Wen Hua Sung (1); GER: None; Notes: Completed early due to mercy rule. Boxscore

==== Mexico 2, Canada 1 ====
August 22 11:00 am EDT Lamade Stadium
| Team | 1 | 2 | 3 | 4 | 5 | 6 | 7 | R | H | E |
|---|---|---|---|---|---|---|---|---|---|---|
| Canada | 0 | 1 | 0 | 0 | 0 | 0 | 0 | 1 | 4 | 2 |
| Mexico ◄ | 0 | 0 | 0 | 1 | 0 | 0 | 1 | 2 | 11 | 2 |
WP: Raul Rojas (1–0) LP: Anthony Cusati (0–1); Home runs: CAN: Anthony Cusati (1); MEX: None; Boxscore

==== Taiwan 8, Canada 0 ====
August 23 3:00 pm EDT Lamade Stadium
| Team | 1 | 2 | 3 | 4 | 5 | 6 | R | H | E |
|---|---|---|---|---|---|---|---|---|---|
| Canada | 0 | 0 | 0 | 0 | 0 | 0 | 0 | 2 | 1 |
| Taiwan ◄ | 0 | 0 | 2 | 1 | 5 | X | 8 | 10 | 0 |
WP: Hung Yuan Lin (1–0) LP: Matteo Vincelli (0–1); Home runs: CAN: None; TWN: Wen Hua Sung (2), Hung Yuan Lin (1); Boxscore

==== Mexico 13, Germany 0 ====
August 24 Noon EDT Lamade Stadium
| Team | 1 | 2 | 3 | 4 | 5 | 6 | R | H | E |
|---|---|---|---|---|---|---|---|---|---|
| Mexico ◄ | 3 | 3 | 0 | 7 | – | – | 13 | 12 | 0 |
| Germany | 0 | 0 | 0 | 0 | – | – | 0 | 1 | 7 |
WP: Oscar Nogera (1–0) LP: Matt Zembraski (0–1); Home runs: MEX: None; GER: None; Notes: Completed early due to mercy rule. Boxscore

==== Canada 14, Germany 13 ====
August 25 2:00 pm EDT Volunteer Stadium
| Team | 1 | 2 | 3 | 4 | 5 | 6 | R | H | E |
|---|---|---|---|---|---|---|---|---|---|
| Canada ◄ | 2 | 0 | 1 | 5 | 2 | 4 | 14 | 13 | 1 |
| Germany | 0 | 0 | 1 | 1 | 11 | 0 | 13 | 13 | 5 |
WP: Ryan Matsuda (1–0) LP: Kenny Martin (0–1); Home runs: CAN: Anthony Cusati 2 (3); GER: Chris Holba (1), Matt Zembraski (1); Boxscore

==== Mexico 3, Taiwan 2 ====
August 25 6:00 pm EDT Lamade Stadium
| Team | 1 | 2 | 3 | 4 | 5 | 6 | R | H | E |
|---|---|---|---|---|---|---|---|---|---|
| Mexico ◄ | 1 | 1 | 0 | 1 | 0 | 0 | 3 | 6 | 2 |
| Taiwan | 0 | 0 | 0 | 0 | 0 | 2 | 2 | 1 | 0 |
WP: Marcelo Martinez (1–0) LP: Cheng Chieh Lee (0–1) Sv: Raul Rojas (1); Home runs: MEX: Luis Trevino (1), Raymundo Berrones (1), Luis Perez (1); TWN: Wen Hua Sung (3); Boxscore

== Elimination round ==
Quarter-finals
26 August - 4:00 pm - Lamade
C2 Japan | 0
D1 Mexico | 6
27 August - 4:00 pm - Lamade
D2 Taiwan | 5
C1 Curaçao | 2
26 August - 8:00 pm - Lamade
A2 (New York (state)) New York | 1
B1 Texas | 4
27 August - 8:00 pm - Lamade
B2 California | 11
A1 (Georgia (U.S. state)) Georgia | 10

Semi-finals
29 August – Noon - Lamade
Mexico | 4
Taiwan | 9
29 August – 7:00 pm - Lamade (F/4)
Texas | 2
California | 12

Final
30 August – 3:00 pm - Lamade
Taiwan | 3
California | 6
Third place
30 August - 11:00 am - Volunteer
Mexico | 5
Texas | 4

=== International Semifinals ===
==== Mexico 6, Japan 0 ====
August 26 4:00 pm EDT Lamade Stadium
| Team | 1 | 2 | 3 | 4 | 5 | 6 | R | H | E |
|---|---|---|---|---|---|---|---|---|---|
| Japan | 0 | 0 | 0 | 0 | 0 | 0 | 0 | 1 | 2 |
| Mexico ◄ | 5 | 1 | 0 | 0 | 0 | X | 6 | 5 | 3 |
WP: Raymundo Berrones (1–0) LP: Toshinori Wakai (1–1); Home runs: JPN: None; MEX: Raul Rojas (1); Boxscore

==== Taiwan 5, Curaçao 2 ====
August 27 4:00 pm EDT Lamade Stadium
| Team | 1 | 2 | 3 | 4 | 5 | 6 | R | H | E |
|---|---|---|---|---|---|---|---|---|---|
| Taiwan ◄ | 0 | 0 | 0 | 2 | 1 | 2 | 5 | 7 | 1 |
| Curaçao | 0 | 0 | 0 | 0 | 0 | 2 | 2 | 4 | 3 |
WP: Chin Ou (1–0) LP: Claycandy Hariquez (1–1); Home runs: TPE: Tang Fu Cheng (1); CUR: None; Boxscore

=== United States Semifinals ===
==== Texas 4, New York 1 ====
August 26 8:00 pm EDT Lamade Stadium
| Team | 1 | 2 | 3 | 4 | 5 | 6 | R | H | E |
|---|---|---|---|---|---|---|---|---|---|
| (New York (state)) New York | 0 | 0 | 1 | 0 | 0 | 0 | 1 | 8 | 0 |
| Texas ◄ | 2 | 2 | 0 | 0 | 0 | X | 4 | 7 | 0 |
WP: Steven Cardone (1–0) LP: Angelo Navetta (1–1) Sv: John Shull (1); Home runs: NY: None; TX: None; Boxscore

==== California 11, Georgia 10 ====
August 27 8:00 pm EDT Lamade Stadium
| Team | 1 | 2 | 3 | 4 | 5 | 6 | R | H | E |
|---|---|---|---|---|---|---|---|---|---|
| (Georgia (U.S. state)) Georgia | 0 | 1 | 0 | 9 | 0 | 0 | 10 | 11 | 1 |
| California ◄ | 0 | 0 | 5 | 2 | 3 | 1 | 11 | 14 | 3 |
WP: Andy Rios (1–0) LP: Conner Smith (1–1); Home runs: GA: Conner Smith (1); CA: Seth Godfrey (3), Luke Ramirez (3), Kiko Garcia (3), Andy Rios (4); Boxscore

=== International Final ===
==== Taiwan 9, Mexico 4 ====
August 29 Noon EDT Lamade Stadium
| Team | 1 | 2 | 3 | 4 | 5 | 6 | R | H | E |
|---|---|---|---|---|---|---|---|---|---|
| Taiwan ◄ | 0 | 2 | 2 | 0 | 0 | 5 | 9 | 6 | 2 |
| Mexico | 0 | 0 | 0 | 2 | 0 | 2 | 4 | 6 | 6 |
WP: Wen Hua Sung (2–0) LP: Marcelo Martinez (1–1); Home runs: TPE: None; MEX: None; Boxscore

=== United States Final ===
==== California 12, Texas 2 ====
August 29 7:00 pm EDT Lamade Stadium
| Team | 1 | 2 | 3 | 4 | 5 | 6 | R | H | E |
|---|---|---|---|---|---|---|---|---|---|
| Texas | 0 | 0 | 0 | 2 | – | – | 2 | 1 | 3 |
| California ◄ | 9 | 0 | 3 | X | – | – | 12 | 9 | 0 |
WP: Luke Ramirez (2–0) LP: John Shull (1–1); Home runs: TX: None; Home: Luke Ramirez (4), Bulla Graft 2 (2), Andy Rios (5); Notes: Completed early due to mercy rule. Boxscore

=== Consolation Game ===
==== Mexico 5, Texas 4 ====
August 30 11:00 am EDT Volunteer Stadium
| Team | 1 | 2 | 3 | 4 | 5 | 6 | R | H | E |
|---|---|---|---|---|---|---|---|---|---|
| Mexico ◄ | 0 | 0 | 3 | 0 | 0 | 2 | 5 | 7 | 1 |
| Texas | 0 | 1 | 2 | 1 | 0 | 0 | 4 | 7 | 0 |
WP: Jorge Maldonado (1–0) LP: Steven Cardone (1–1); Home runs: MEX: Raymundo Berrones (2); TX: None; Boxscore

=== Championship Game ===
==== California 6, Taiwan 3 ====
August 30 3:00 pm EDT Lamade Stadium
| Team | 1 | 2 | 3 | 4 | 5 | 6 | R | H | E |
|---|---|---|---|---|---|---|---|---|---|
| Taiwan | 0 | 0 | 3 | 0 | 0 | 0 | 3 | 5 | 2 |
| California ◄ | 0 | 0 | 1 | 3 | 2 | X | 6 | 10 | 0 |
WP: Kiko Garcia (2–0) LP: Hung Yuan Lin (1–1); Home runs: TPE: Wen Hua Sung (4), Chin Ou (1); CA: None; Boxscore
