= 2019 Little League World Series results =

Children's baseball competition results

The results of the 2019 Little League World Series were determined between August 15 and August 25, 2019 in South Williamsport, Pennsylvania. 16 teams were divided into two groups, one with eight teams from the United States and another with eight international teams, with both groups playing a modified double-elimination tournament. In each group, the last remaining undefeated team faced the last remaining team with one loss, with the winners of those games advancing to play for the Little League World Series championship.

Double-elimination
United States
United States	Winner's Bracket						
United States	(Rhode Island) RI 0 (Virginia) VA 3◄ Linescore	(Minnesota) MN 2◄ (Kentucky) KY 1 Linescore	(Louisiana) LA 2 (Hawaii) HI 5◄ Linescore	(New Jersey) NJ 6◄ (Oregon) OR 2 Linescore	(Minnesota) MN 0 (F/4) (Virginia) VA 11◄ Linescore	(New Jersey) NJ 0 (Hawaii) HI 6◄ Linescore	(Hawaii) HI 12◄ (Virginia) VA 9 Linescore
United States	Loser's Bracket						
United States	(Kentucky) KY 1 (Rhode Island) RI 6◄ Linescore	(Louisiana) LA 3◄ (Oregon) OR 2 Linescore	(New Jersey) NJ 2◄ (Rhode Island) RI 0 Linescore	(Minnesota) MN 0 (F/4) (Louisiana) LA 10◄ Linescore	(New Jersey) NJ 1 (Louisiana) LA 4◄ Linescore	(Virginia) VA 0 (F/5) (Louisiana) LA 10◄ Linescore	
International
International	Winner's Bracket						
International	(Australia) AUS 0 (F/4) (Curaçao) CUR 11◄ Linescore	(South Korea) KOR 10◄ (Venezuela) VEN 3 Linescore	(Japan) JPN 20◄ (Italy) ITA 0 (F/5); Linescore	(Mexico) MEX 5◄ (Canada) CAN 0 Linescore	(Curaçao) CUR 0 (South Korea) KOR 4◄ Linescore	(Mexico) MEX 0 (Japan) JPN 5◄ Linescore	(South Korea) KOR 2 (Japan) JPN 7◄ Linescore
International	Loser's Bracket						
International	(Australia) AUS 0 (Venezuela) VEN 2◄ Linescore	(Canada) CAN 10◄ (Italy) ITA 0 (F/4); Linescore	(Mexico) MEX 7 (Venezuela) VEN 8◄ Linescore	(Canada) CAN 1 (Curaçao) CUR 8◄ Linescore	(Curaçao) CUR 9◄ (Venezuela) VEN 2 Linescore	(South Korea) KOR 3 (Curaçao) CUR 5◄ Linescore	
Consolation games	Kentucky 4◄ Australia 1 Linescore				Italy 3 Oregon 4◄ Linescore		
Single-elimination
International championship	Curaçao 5◄ Japan 4 Linescore						
United States championship	Louisiana 9◄ Hawaii 5 Linescore						
Third place game	Hawaii 0 Japan 5◄ Linescore						
World championship game	Louisiana 8◄ Curaçao 0 Linescore						

== Double-elimination stage ==
=== United States ===
Upper round 1	Upper round 2	Upper final	Final
August 16 – Game 2
Rhode Island	0
August 18 – Game 14 (F/4)
Virginia	3
Virginia	11
August 16 – Game 4
Minnesota	0
Minnesota	2
August 21 – Game 24
Kentucky	1
Virginia	9
August 16 – Game 6
Hawaii	12
Hawaii	5
August 18/19 – Game 16
Louisiana	2
Hawaii	6
August 16 – Game 8
New Jersey	0
Oregon	2	August 24 – U.S. championship
New Jersey	6	Hawaii	5
Louisiana	9
Lower round 1	Lower round 2	Lower round 3	Lower final
August 20 – Game 18
August 17 – Game 10	New Jersey	2	August 22 – Game 26 (F/5)
Rhode Island	6	Rhode Island	0	August 21 – Game 22	Virginia	0
Kentucky	1	New Jersey	1	Louisiana	10
August 19 – Game 20 (F/4)	Louisiana	4
August 17 – Game 12	Minnesota	0
Louisiana	3	Louisiana	10
Oregon	2

==== Winner's Bracket ====
===== Game 2: Virginia 3, Rhode Island 0 =====
August 16 10:00 am EDT Howard J. Lamade Stadium
Team	1	2	3	4	5	6	R	H	E
Rhode Island	0	0	0	0	0	0	0	0	0
Virginia ◄	0	0	0	0	3	X	3	9	0
WP: Liam Thyen (1–0) LP: Alex Anderson (0–1) Sv: Chase Obstgarten (1); Home runs: RI: None; VA: Brady Yates (1); Boxscore

===== Game 4: Minnesota 2, Kentucky 1 =====
August 16 1:00 pm EDT Howard J. Lamade Stadium
Team	1	2	3	4	5	6	R	H	E
Minnesota ◄	0	2	0	0	0	0	2	2	4
Kentucky	0	0	1	0	0	0	1	2	0
WP: Jameson Kuznia (1–0) LP: Grayson Newman (0–1) Sv: Carson Timm (1); Boxscore

===== Game 6: Hawaii 5, Louisiana 2 =====
August 16 4:00 pm EDT Howard J. Lamade Stadium
Team	1	2	3	4	5	6	R	H	E
Louisiana	1	0	0	0	1	0	2	9	1
Hawaii ◄	4	0	0	0	1	X	5	8	2
WP: Jaren Pascual (1–0) LP: Marshall Louque (0–1); Boxscore

===== Game 8: New Jersey 6, Oregon 2 =====
August 16 7:00 pm EDT Howard J. Lamade Stadium
Team	1	2	3	4	5	6	R	H	E
New Jersey ◄	0	1	0	0	5	0	6	6	1
Oregon	0	2	0	0	0	0	2	6	2
WP: Yadi Mateo (1–0) LP: Gavin Price (0–1) Sv: J.R. Rosado (1); Boxscore

===== Game 14: Virginia 11, Minnesota 0 =====
August 18 11:00 am EDT Howard J. Lamade Stadium
Team	1	2	3	4	5	6	R	H	E
Minnesota	0	0	0	0	–	–	0	0	2
Virginia ◄	3	5	3	X	–	–	11	9	0
WP: Justin Lee (1–0) LP: Drew Law (0–1); Notes: Completed early due to the run rule. Boxscore

===== Game 16: Hawaii 6, New Jersey 0 =====
August 18 2:00 pm EDT (resumed August 19 1:00 pm EDT) Howard J. Lamade Stadium
Team	1	2	3	4	5	6	R	H	E
New Jersey	0	0	0	0	0	0	0	4	2
Hawaii ◄	1	2	3	0	0	X	6	5	0
WP: Logan Kuloloia (1–0) LP: J.R. Rosado (0–1) Sv: Isaac Imamura (1); Home runs: NJ: None; HI: Jaren Pascual (1); Notes: The game was suspended during the top of the 5th inning due to inclement weather, and completed the following day. Boxscore

===== Game 24: Hawaii 12, Virginia 9 =====
August 21 7:30 pm EDT Howard J. Lamade Stadium
Team	1	2	3	4	5	6	R	H	E
Hawaii ◄	5	1	2	1	3	0	12	13	4
Virginia	2	0	6	0	0	1	9	8	5
WP: Bransyn Hong (1–0) LP: Chase Obstgarten (0–1); Boxscore

==== Loser's Bracket ====
===== Game 10: Rhode Island 6, Kentucky 1 =====
August 17 3:00 pm EDT Howard J. Lamade Stadium
Team	1	2	3	4	5	6	R	H	E
Kentucky	0	0	0	1	0	0	1	2	1
Rhode Island ◄	0	0	1	4	1	X	6	8	1
WP: Owen Pfeffer (1–0) LP: Evan Schallert (0–1); Notes: Kentucky is eliminated. Boxscore

===== Game 12: Louisiana 3, Oregon 2 =====
August 17 8:00 pm EDT Howard J. Lamade Stadium
Team	1	2	3	4	5	6	R	H	E
Louisiana ◄	0	0	3	0	0	0	3	7	0
Oregon	0	0	2	0	0	0	2	4	0
WP: Conner Perrot (1–0) LP: Avery Lohrman (0–1); Notes: Oregon is eliminated. Boxscore

===== Game 18: New Jersey 2, Rhode Island 0 =====
August 20 7:30 pm EDT Howard J. Lamade Stadium
Team	1	2	3	4	5	6	R	H	E
New Jersey ◄	0	0	0	0	0	2	2	5	0
Rhode Island	0	0	0	0	0	0	0	1	1
WP: J.R. Rosado (1–1) LP: Miles Fontaine (0–1) Sv: Jayden Capindica (1); Notes: Rhode Island is eliminated. Boxscore

===== Game 20: Louisiana 10, Minnesota 0 =====
August 19 7:30 pm EDT Howard J. Lamade Stadium
Team	1	2	3	4	5	6	R	H	E
Minnesota	0	0	0	0	–	–	0	2	2
Louisiana ◄	3	0	2	5	–	–	10	11	0
WP: Marshall Louque (1–1) LP: Drew Law (0–2); Notes: Completed early due to the run rule. Minnesota is eliminated. Boxscore

===== Game 22: Louisiana 4, New Jersey 1 =====
August 21 11:00 am EDT Howard J. Lamade Stadium
Team	1	2	3	4	5	6	R	H	E
New Jersey	0	0	0	0	0	1	1	2	3
Louisiana ◄	1	0	3	0	0	X	4	3	1
WP: Egan Prather (1–0) LP: J.R. Rosado (1–2); Notes: New Jersey is eliminated. Boxscore

===== Game 26: Louisiana 10, Virginia 0 =====
August 22 7:00 pm EDT Howard J. Lamade Stadium
Team	1	2	3	4	5	6	R	H	E
Virginia	0	0	0	0	0	–	0	0	1
Louisiana ◄	0	0	1	7	2	–	10	13	1
WP: Marshall Louque (2–1) LP: Justin Lee (1–1); Home runs: VA: None; LA: Reece Roussel (1); Notes: Completed early due to the run rule. Virginia is eliminated. Boxscore

=== International ===
Upper round 1	Upper round 2	Upper final	Final
August 15 – Game 1 (F/4)
Curaçao	11
August 18 – Game 13
Australia	0
Curaçao	0
August 16 – Game 3
South Korea	4
South Korea	10
August 21 – Game 23
Venezuela	3
South Korea	2
August 16 – Game 5 (F/5)
Japan	7
Japan	20
August 18 – Game 15
Italy	0
Japan	5
August 16 – Game 7
Mexico	0
Mexico	5	August 24 – International championship
Canada	0	Japan	4
Curaçao	5
Lower round 1	Lower round 2	Lower round 3	Lower final
August 19 – Game 17
August 17 – Game 9	Mexico	7	August 22 – Game 25
Australia	0	Venezuela	8	August 20 – Game 21	South Korea	3
Venezuela	2	Venezuela	2	Curaçao	5
August 19 – Game 19	Curaçao	9
August 17 – Game 11 (F/4)	Curaçao	8
Italy	0	Canada	1
Canada	10

==== Winner's Bracket ====
===== Game 1: Curaçao 11, Australia 0 =====
August 15 1:00 pm EDT Volunteer Stadium
Team	1	2	3	4	5	6	R	H	E
Australia	0	0	0	0	–	–	0	0	3
Curaçao ◄	0	7	4	X	–	–	11	10	0
WP: Shendrion Martinus (1–0) LP: Max Miotto (0–1); Home runs: AUS: None; CUR: Curley Martha (1); Notes: Completed early due to the run rule. Boxscore

===== Game 3: South Korea 10, Venezuela 3 =====
August 16 11:00 am EDT Volunteer Stadium
Team	1	2	3	4	5	6	R	H	E
South Korea ◄	1	0	3	3	3	0	10	9	3
Venezuela	0	2	1	0	0	0	3	2	4
WP: Gibeom Jung (1–0) LP: Moisés Concho (0–1); Home runs: KOR: Jinwon Na (1); VEN: None; Boxscore

===== Game 5: Japan 20, Italy 0 =====
August 16 2:00 pm EDT Volunteer Stadium
Team	1	2	3	4	5	6	R	H	E
Japan ◄	0	1	1	4	14	–	20	18	0
Italy	0	0	0	0	0	–	0	2	3
WP: Yuto Kakeba (1–0) LP: Giulio Bissa (0–1) Sv: Yuto Misaki (1); Home runs: JPN: Yuto Misaki (1), Taishi Kawaguchi (1); ITA: None; Notes: Completed early due to the run rule. Boxscore

===== Game 7: Mexico 5, Canada 0 =====
August 16 5:00 pm EDT Volunteer Stadium
Team	1	2	3	4	5	6	R	H	E
Mexico ◄	0	0	1	0	2	2	5	2	0
Canada	0	0	0	0	0	0	0	2	4
WP: Santiago Leija (1–0) LP: Matt Shanley (0–1); Boxscore

===== Game 13: South Korea 4, Curaçao 0 =====
August 18 9:00 am EDT Volunteer Stadium
Team	1	2	3	4	5	6	R	H	E
Curaçao	0	0	0	0	0	0	0	1	3
South Korea ◄	0	0	1	0	3	0	4	3	0
WP: Jinwon Na (1–0) LP: Curley Martha (0–1); Boxscore

===== Game 15: Japan 5, Mexico 0 =====
August 18 1:00 pm EDT Volunteer Stadium
Team	1	2	3	4	5	6	R	H	E
Mexico	0	0	0	0	0	0	0	3	2
Japan ◄	0	1	4	0	0	X	5	6	0
WP: Ritsu Nishikawa (1–0) LP: Marcelo Herrera (0–1) Sv: Yuto Misaki (2); Home runs: MEX: None; JPN: Yuto Kakeba (1); Boxscore

===== Game 23: Japan 7, South Korea 2 =====
August 21 3:00 pm EDT Howard J. Lamade Stadium
Team	1	2	3	4	5	6	R	H	E
South Korea	1	1	0	0	0	0	2	3	1
Japan ◄	2	0	2	1	2	X	7	7	0
WP: Yuto Misaki (1–0) LP: Suho Yang (0–1); Home runs: KOR: Jinwon Na (2), Gibeom Jung (1); JPN: None; Boxscore

==== Loser's Bracket ====
===== Game 9: Venezuela 2, Australia 0 =====
August 17 1:00 pm EDT Volunteer Stadium
Team	1	2	3	4	5	6	R	H	E
Australia	0	0	0	0	0	0	0	3	0
Venezuela ◄	0	1	0	0	1	X	2	5	2
WP: Randy Soto (1–0) LP: Max Miotto (0–2); Notes: Australia is eliminated. Boxscore

===== Game 11: Canada 10, Italy 0 =====
August 17 6:00 pm EDT Volunteer Stadium
Team	1	2	3	4	5	6	R	H	E
Canada ◄	0	5	0	5	–	–	10	6	1
Italy	0	0	0	0	–	–	0	3	3
WP: Brady Dorwart (1–0) LP: Elia Zaccarini (0–1); Notes: Completed early due to the run rule. Italy is eliminated. Boxscore

===== Game 17: Venezuela 8, Mexico 7 =====
August 19 3:00 pm EDT Volunteer Stadium
Team	1	2	3	4	5	6	R	H	E
Mexico	2	4	0	1	0	0	7	5	3
Venezuela ◄	2	1	0	2	3	X	8	6	1
WP: Jonathan Rangel (1–0) LP: Angel Castillo (0–1); Home runs: MEX: None; VEN: Davirik Fuenmayor (1); Notes: Mexico is eliminated. Boxscore

===== Game 19: Curaçao 8, Canada 1 =====
August 19 4:00 pm EDT Howard J. Lamade Stadium
Team	1	2	3	4	5	6	R	H	E
Canada	0	0	0	0	0	1	1	3	2
Curaçao ◄	2	2	0	0	4	X	8	9	2
WP: Keven Rosina (1–0) LP: Timmy Piasentin (0–1); Notes: Canada is eliminated. Boxscore

===== Game 21: Curaçao 9, Venezuela 2 =====
August 20 7:30 pm EDT Howard J. Lamade Stadium
Team	1	2	3	4	5	6	R	H	E
Curaçao ◄	2	3	0	0	0	4	9	12	4
Venezuela	0	0	1	1	0	0	2	4	1
WP: Curley Martha (1–1) LP: Diego Boscán (0–1) Sv: Jurdrick Profar (1); Notes: Venezuela is eliminated. Boxscore

===== Game 25: Curaçao 5, South Korea 3 =====
August 22 3:00 pm EDT Howard J. Lamade Stadium
Team	1	2	3	4	5	6	R	H	E
South Korea	1	0	2	0	0	0	3	4	0
Curaçao ◄	4	0	1	0	0	X	5	6	0
WP: Jurdrick Profar (1–0) LP: Jinwon Na (1–1) Sv: Curley Martha (1); Home runs: KOR: None; CUR: Clay Winklaar (1), Curley Martha (2); Notes: South Korea is eliminated. Boxscore

=== Consolation games ===
==== Game A: Kentucky 4, Australia 1 ====
August 19 11:00 am EDT Volunteer Stadium
Team	1	2	3	4	5	6	R	H	E
Kentucky ◄	0	3	0	0	0	1	4	6	1
Australia	0	0	1	0	0	0	1	3	3
WP: Chaze Huff (1–0) LP: Zac Curtis (0–1); Boxscore

==== Game B: Oregon 4, Italy 3 ====
August 20 11:00 am EDT Howard J. Lamade Stadium
Team	1	2	3	4	5	6	R	H	E
Italy	0	0	1	0	2	0	3	5	3
Oregon ◄	1	0	3	0	0	X	4	5	2
WP: Gavin Price (1–1) LP: Alex Giovanardi (0–1) Sv: Carson McNally (1); Boxscore

== Single-elimination stage ==
=== International championship: Curaçao 5, Japan 4 ===
August 24 12:30 pm EDT Howard J. Lamade Stadium
Team	1	2	3	4	5	6	R	H	E
Curaçao ◄	1	0	2	0	2	0	5	5	1
Japan	0	0	2	0	0	2	4	5	2
WP: Curley Martha (2–1) LP: Taishi Kawaguchi (0–1); Home runs: CUR: Curley Martha (3); JPN: None; Notes: Japan is eliminated. Boxscore

=== United States championship: Louisiana 9, Hawaii 5 ===
August 24 3:30 pm EDT Howard J. Lamade Stadium
Team	1	2	3	4	5	6	R	H	E
Louisiana ◄	0	0	0	0	5	4	9	11	0
Hawaii	0	0	0	0	0	5	5	7	3
WP: William Andrade (1–0) LP: Logan Kuloloia (1–1) Sv: Ryder Planchard (1); Notes: Hawaii is eliminated. Boxscore

=== Third place game: Japan 5, Hawaii 0 ===
August 25 10:00 am EDT Howard J. Lamade Stadium
Team	1	2	3	4	5	6	R	H	E
Hawaii	0	0	0	0	0	0	0	6	0
Japan ◄	3	0	0	0	2	X	5	7	1
WP: Yuto Misaki (2–0) LP: Shiloh Gilliland (0–1) Sv: Yuto Kakeba (1); Boxscore

=== World championship game: Louisiana 8, Curaçao 0 ===
August 25 3:00 pm EDT Howard J. Lamade Stadium
Team	1	2	3	4	5	6	R	H	E
Louisiana ◄	1	0	1	0	4	2	8	10	0
Curaçao	0	0	0	0	0	0	0	2	1
WP: Egan Prather (2–0) LP: Keven Rosina (1–1); Boxscore
