= 2013 Little League World Series results =

Children's baseball competition results

The results of the 2013 Little League World Series were determined between August 15 and August 25, 2013, in South Williamsport, Pennsylvania. 16 teams were divided into two groups, one with eight teams from the United States and another with eight international teams, with both groups playing a modified double-elimination tournament. In each group, the last remaining undefeated team faced the last remaining team with one loss, with the winners of those games advancing to play for the Little League World Series championship.

Double-Elimination
United States
United States	Winner's bracket						
United States	(Washington (state)) WA 8◄ (Texas) TX 4 Linescore	(Tennessee) TN 2 (Connecticut) CT 3◄ Linescore	(California) CA 3◄ (Michigan) MI 0 (F/7); Linescore	(Delaware) DE 6◄ (Iowa) IA 3 Linescore	(Connecticut) CT 9◄ (Washington (state)) WA 7 Linescore	(Delaware) DE 3 (F/4) (California) CA 15◄ Linescore	(California) CA 6◄ (Connecticut) CT 3 (F/9); Linescore
United States	Loser's bracket						
United States	(Tennessee) TN 10◄ (Texas) TX 2 Linescore	(Iowa) IA 6◄ (Michigan) MI 5 Linescore	(Delaware) DE 0 (F/4) (Tennessee) TN 10◄ Linescore	(Washington (state)) WA 6◄ (Iowa) IA 5 Linescore	(Washington (state)) WA 6◄ (Tennessee) TN 5 Linescore	(Washington (state)) WA 13 (F/7) (Connecticut) CT 14◄ Linescore	
International
International	Winner's bracket						
International	(Puerto Rico) PR 4 (Panama) PAN 9◄ Linescore	(Australia) AUS 0 (F/4) (Mexico) MEX 12◄ Linescore	(Canada) CAN 2 (Chinese Taipei) TPE 10◄ Linescore	(Czech Republic) CZE 3 (Japan) JPN 7◄ Linescore	(Mexico) MEX 13◄ (Panama) PAN 0 (F/4); Linescore	(Japan) JPN 3◄ (Chinese Taipei) TPE 2 Linescore	(Mexico) MEX 2 (Japan) JPN 5◄ Linescore
International	Loser's bracket						
International	(Australia) AUS 0 (Puerto Rico) PR 4◄ Linescore	(Czech Republic) CZE 3 (Canada) CAN 4◄ Linescore	(Puerto Rico) PR 4 (Chinese Taipei) TPE 6◄ Linescore	(Panama) PAN 12◄ (Canada) CAN 0 (F/4); Linescore	(Chinese Taipei) TPE 7 (Panama) PAN 8◄ Linescore	(Mexico) MEX 4◄ (Panama) PAN 2 (F/7); Linescore	
Crossover games	Australia 2 Texas 5◄ Linescore				Michigan 3 Czech Republic 5◄ Linescore		
Single-Elimination
International Championship	Japan 3◄ Mexico 2 Linescore						
United States Championship	California 12◄ Connecticut 1 Linescore						
Consolation Game	Connecticut 14; Mexico 15◄ Linescore						
World Championship Game	California 4 Japan 6◄ Linescore						

== Double-elimination stage ==
=== United States ===
Upper round 1	Upper round 2	Upper final	Final
August 15 – Game 2
Delaware	6
August 18 – Game 14 (F/4)
Iowa	3
Delaware	3
August 15 – Game 4 (F/7)
California	15
California	3
August 21 – Game 24 (F/9)
Michigan	0
California	6
August 16 – Game 6
Connecticut	3
Texas	4
August 18 – Game 16
(Washington (state)) Washington	8
Washington	7
August 16 – Game 8
Connecticut	9
Tennessee	2	August 24 – U.S. championship
Connecticut	3	California	12
Connecticut	1
Lower round 1	Lower round 2	Lower round 3	Lower final
August 19 – Game 18
August 17 – Game 10	Iowa	5	August 23 – Game 26 (F/7)
Iowa	6	Washington	6	August 20 – Game 22	Connecticut	14
Michigan	5	Washington	6	Washington	13
August 19 – Game 20 (F/4)	Tennessee	5
August 17 – Game 12	Delaware	0
Texas	2	Tennessee	10
Tennessee	10

==== Winner's bracket ====
===== Game 2: Washington 8, Texas 4 =====
August 15 3:00 pm EDT Howard J. Lamade Stadium
Team	1	2	3	4	5	6	R	H	E
(Washington (state)) Washington ◄	4	1	0	0	1	2	8	8	1
Texas	1	0	3	0	0	0	4	8	3
WP: Jacob Dahlstrom (1–0) LP: Juan Sosa (0–1) Sv: Jack Matheson (1); Home runs: WA: Jack Carper (1); TX: None; Boxscore

===== Game 4: Connecticut 3, Tennessee 2 =====
August 15 7:00 pm EDT Howard J. Lamade Stadium
Team	1	2	3	4	5	6	R	H	E
Tennessee	0	0	1	0	1	0	2	6	0
Connecticut ◄	1	0	0	0	2	X	3	7	0
WP: Harry Azadian (1–0) LP: Trae McLemore (0–1); Home runs: TN: Ben Pickman (1); CT: Ricky Offenberg (1); Boxscore

===== Game 6: California 3, Michigan 0 =====
August 16 3:00 pm EDT Howard J. Lamade Stadium
Team	1	2	3	4	5	6	7	R	H	E
California ◄	0	0	0	0	0	0	3	3	5	0
Michigan	0	0	0	0	0	0	0	0	0	0
WP: Grant Holman (1–0) LP: Antonio Moceri (0–1); Home runs: CA: None; MI: None; Boxscore

===== Game 8: Delaware 6, Iowa 3 =====
August 16 8:00 pm EDT Howard J. Lamade Stadium
Team	1	2	3	4	5	6	R	H	E
Delaware ◄	5	0	0	0	0	1	6	8	0
Iowa	2	0	0	0	0	1	3	2	0
WP: Joseph Davis (1–0) LP: Sam Young (0–1) Sv: Nathan Hardcastle (1); Home runs: DE: None; IA: None; Boxscore

===== Game 14: Connecticut 9, Washington 7 =====
August 18 2:00 pm EDT Howard J. Lamade Stadium
Team	1	2	3	4	5	6	R	H	E
Connecticut ◄	0	7	0	2	0	0	9	13	2
(Washington (state)) Washington	0	0	1	2	4	0	7	9	1
WP: Harry Azadian (2–0) LP: Jacob Dahlstrom (1–1) Sv: Alex Reiner (1); Home runs: CT: Harry Azadian (1); WA: None; Boxscore

===== Game 15: California 15, Delaware 3 =====
August 18 5:00 pm EDT Volunteer Stadium
Team	1	2	3	4	5	6	R	H	E
Delaware	2	0	0	1	–	–	3	3	1
California ◄	2	3	2	8	–	–	15	10	2
WP: Nick Mora (1–0) LP: Nathan Hardcastle (0–1); Home runs: DE: Brandon Sengphachanh (1); CA: Micah Pietila-Wiggs (1), Jake Espinoza (1), Grant Holman (1), Michael Gaines (1); Notes: Completed early due to mercy rule. Boxscore

===== Game 24: California 6, Connecticut 3 =====
August 21 8:00 pm EDT Howard J. Lamade Stadium
Team	1	2	3	4	5	6	7	8	9	R	H	E
California ◄	0	0	0	1	0	2	0	0	3	6	9	0
Connecticut	0	0	0	3	0	0	0	0	0	3	5	1
WP: Rennard Williams (1–0) LP: Alex Reiner (0–1); Home runs: CA: Grant Holman (2), Nick Mora 2 (2); CT: Matt Brown (1); Boxscore

==== Loser's bracket ====
===== Game 10: Tennessee 10, Texas 2 =====
August 17 3:00 pm EDT Howard J. Lamade Stadium
Team	1	2	3	4	5	6	R	H	E
Tennessee ◄	0	0	0	3	3	4	10	9	0
Texas	0	0	0	0	1	1	2	4	2
WP: Ben Pickman (1–0) LP: Jesus Ortiz (0–1); Home runs: TN: Trae McLemore (1); TX: Jared Cruz (1); Notes: Texas is eliminated. Boxscore

===== Game 12: Iowa 6, Michigan 5 =====
August 17 8:00 pm EDT Howard J. Lamade Stadium
Team	1	2	3	4	5	6	R	H	E
Iowa ◄	0	0	1	3	1	1	6	7	0
Michigan	0	0	0	0	0	5	5	3	1
WP: Grant Garwood (1–0) LP: James Mazzola (0–1); Home runs: MI: Brook Heinen (1), Carter Troncin (1); IA: Jack Vyletel (1); Notes: Michigan is eliminated. Boxscore

===== Game 18: Tennessee 10, Delaware 0 =====
August 19 4:00 pm EDT Howard J. Lamade Stadium
Team	1	2	3	4	5	6	R	H	E
Delaware	0	0	0	0	–	–	0	1	0
Tennessee ◄	0	6	1	3	–	–	10	11	0
WP: Tanner Morgan (1–0) LP: Ryan Miller (0–1); Home runs: DE: None; TN: Zane Denton (1), Knox Preston (1); Notes: Completed early due to mercy rule. Delaware is eliminated. Boxscore

===== Game 20: Washington 6, Iowa 5 =====
August 19 8:00 pm EDT Howard J. Lamade Stadium
Team	1	2	3	4	5	6	R	H	E
(Washington (state)) Washington ◄	2	0	2	0	0	2	6	10	1
Iowa	0	1	0	1	0	3	5	5	2
WP: Dalton Chandler (1–0) LP: Brady Roberts (0–1); Home runs: WA: None; IA: None; Notes: Iowa is eliminated. Boxscore

===== Game 22: Washington 6, Tennessee 5 =====
August 20 8:00 pm EDT Howard J. Lamade Stadium
Team	1	2	3	4	5	6	R	H	E
(Washington (state)) Washington ◄	0	0	6	0	0	0	6	8	1
Tennessee	2	0	2	1	0	0	5	8	2
WP: Jacob Dahlstrom (2–1) LP: Trae McLemore (0–2); Home runs: WA: None; TN: Ben Pickman (2); Notes: Tennessee is eliminated. Boxscore

===== Game 26: Connecticut 14, Washington 13 =====
August 23 3:00 pm EDT Howard J. Lamade Stadium
Team	1	2	3	4	5	6	7	R	H	E
(Washington (state)) Washington	1	0	1	10	1	0	0	13	16	3
Connecticut ◄	0	2	3	1	7	0	1	14	14	0
WP: Alex Reiner (1–1) LP: Dylan Matsuoka (0–1); Home runs: WA: None; CT: Chad Knight (1), Tatin Llamas (1), Ricky Offenberg (2), Max Popken (1), Alex Reiner (1); Notes: Rescheduled from August 22 due to severe weather. Washington is eliminated. Boxscore

=== International ===
Upper round 1	Upper round 2	Upper final	Final
August 15 – Game 1
Panama	9
August 18 – Game 13 (F/4)
Puerto Rico	4
Panama	0
August 15 – Game 3 (F/4)
Mexico	13
Australia	0
August 21 – Game 23
Mexico	12
Mexico	2
August 16 – Game 5
Japan	5
Chinese Taipei	10
August 18 – Game 15
Canada	2
Chinese Taipei	2
August 16 – Game 7
Japan	3
Japan	7	August 24 – Intl. championship
Czech Republic	3	Japan	3
Mexico	2
Lower round 1	Lower round 2	Lower round 3	Lower final
August 19 – Game 17
August 17 – Game 9	Chinese Taipei	6	August 22 – Game 25 (F/7)
Puerto Rico	4	Puerto Rico	4	August 20 – Game 21	Mexico	4
Australia	0	Chinese Taipei	7	Panama	2
August 19 – Game 19 (F/4)	Panama	8
August 17 – Game 11	Canada	0
Canada	4	Panama	12
Czech Republic	3

==== Winner's bracket ====
===== Game 1: Panama 9, Puerto Rico 4 =====
August 15 1:00 pm EDT Volunteer Stadium
Team	1	2	3	4	5	6	R	H	E
Puerto Rico	0	0	0	4	0	0	4	4	1
Panama ◄	1	5	0	2	1	X	9	6	2
WP: Jean Mar Sanchez (1–0) LP: Robert Addarich (0–1) Sv: Edgardo Rosales (1); Home runs: PR: None; PAN: Daniel Fernandez (1), Juan Crisp (1); Boxscore

===== Game 3: Mexico 12, Australia 0 =====
August 15 5:00 pm EDT Volunteer Stadium
Team	1	2	3	4	5	6	R	H	E
Australia	0	0	0	0	–	–	0	2	1
Mexico ◄	0	5	7	X	–	–	12	10	0
WP: Brandon Meza (1–0) LP: Chase Diggins (0–1); Home runs: AUS: None; MEX: Brandon Montes (1); Notes: Completed early due to mercy rule. Boxscore

===== Game 5: Chinese Taipei 10, Canada 2 =====
August 16 1:00 pm EDT Volunteer Stadium
Team	1	2	3	4	5	6	R	H	E
Canada	0	0	0	2	0	0	2	5	0
Chinese Taipei ◄	3	2	0	5	0	X	10	13	0
WP: Tung-Jua Yeh (1–0) LP: Angus Adams (0–1); Home runs: CAN: Angus Adams (1); TPE: Huai-Chien Lan (1), Shih-Che Chou (1), Tung-Jua Yeh (1); Boxscore

===== Game 7: Japan 7, Czech Republic 3 =====
August 16 5:00 pm EDT Volunteer Stadium
Team	1	2	3	4	5	6	R	H	E
Czech Republic	0	0	2	0	1	0	3	2	0
Japan ◄	3	3	0	0	1	X	7	12	3
WP: Kazuki Ishida (1–0) LP: Viktor Vecerka (0–1); Home runs: CZE: Daniel Stoudek (1); JPN: Kazuki Ishida (1); Boxscore

===== Game 13: Mexico 13, Panama 0 =====
August 18 Noon EDT Volunteer Stadium
Team	1	2	3	4	5	6	R	H	E
Mexico ◄	2	5	3	3	–	–	13	14	0
Panama	0	0	0	0	–	–	0	1	1
WP: Luis Manzo (1–0) LP: Daniel Fernandez (0–1); Home runs: MEX: Brandon Montes (2), Martin González (1), Ramon Mendoza 2 (2), Saúl Favela (1); PAN: None; Notes: Completed early due to mercy rule. Boxscore

===== Game 16: Japan 3, Chinese Taipei 2 =====
August 18 7:00 pm EDT Howard J. Lamade Stadium
Team	1	2	3	4	5	6	R	H	E
Japan ◄	0	1	0	0	0	2	3	6	2
Chinese Taipei	0	0	0	0	0	2	2	5	0
WP: Kazuki Ishida (2–0) LP: Shih-Che Chou (0–1) Sv: Kyousuke Kobayashi (1); Home runs: JPN: Takuma Gomi (1); TPE: None; Boxscore

===== Game 23: Japan 5, Mexico 2 =====
August 21 4:00 pm EDT Howard J. Lamade Stadium
Team	1	2	3	4	5	6	R	H	E
Mexico	0	1	1	0	0	0	2	5	0
Japan ◄	0	1	0	1	3	X	5	9	1
WP: Ryutarro Takeo (1–0) LP: Ramon Mendoza (0–1); Home runs: MEX: Brandon Montes (3); JPN: Kazuki Ishida (2), Seiya Nishino (1); Boxscore

==== Loser's bracket ====
===== Game 9: Puerto Rico 4, Australia 0 =====
August 17 Noon EDT Volunteer Stadium
Team	1	2	3	4	5	6	R	H	E
Australia	0	0	0	0	0	0	0	5	2
Puerto Rico ◄	0	0	0	3	1	X	4	7	0
WP: Tommylee Sierra (1–0) LP: Maverick Hamilton (0–1); Home runs: AUS: None; PR: None; Notes: Australia is eliminated. Boxscore

===== Game 11: Canada 4, Czech Republic 3 =====
August 17 6:00 pm EDT Volunteer Stadium
Team	1	2	3	4	5	6	R	H	E
Czech Republic	0	0	1	1	0	1	3	7	1
Canada ◄	1	0	3	0	0	X	4	3	1
WP: Ken Nguyen (1–0) LP: Viktor Vecerka (0–2) Sv: David Legault (1); Home runs: CZE: Daniel Stoudek (2); CAN: Angus Adams (2); Notes: Czech Republic is eliminated. Boxscore

===== Game 17: Chinese Taipei 6, Puerto Rico 4 =====
August 19 2:00 pm EDT Volunteer Stadium
Team	1	2	3	4	5	6	R	H	E
Puerto Rico	0	1	2	0	0	1	4	9	0
Chinese Taipei ◄	0	0	1	4	1	X	6	6	1
WP: Chen-Hsun Lee (1–0) LP: Leonardo Lizardi (0–1) Sv: Tung-Jua Yeh (1); Home runs: PR: None; TPE: None; Notes: Puerto Rico is eliminated. Boxscore

===== Game 19: Panama 12, Canada 0 =====
August 19 6:00 pm EDT Volunteer Stadium
Team	1	2	3	4	5	6	R	H	E
Panama ◄	0	6	6	0	–	–	12	13	0
Canada	0	0	0	0	–	–	0	1	0
WP: Edgardo Rosales (1–0) LP: Angus Adams (0–2); Home runs: PAN: Edgardo Rosales (1), Jean Mar Sanchez (1); CAN: None; Notes: Completed early due to mercy rule. Canada is eliminated. Boxscore

===== Game 21: Panama 8, Chinese Taipei 7 =====
August 20 4:00 pm EDT Howard J. Lamade Stadium
Team	1	2	3	4	5	6	R	H	E
Chinese Taipei	0	1	6	0	0	0	7	13	1
Panama ◄	4	0	0	0	0	4	8	7	1
WP: Rafael Eysseric (1–0) LP: Teng-Yao Yu (0–1); Home runs: TPE: None; PAN: Armando Lopez (1); Notes: Chinese Taipei is eliminated. Boxscore

===== Game 25: Mexico 4, Panama 2 =====
August 22 4:00 pm EDT Howard J. Lamade Stadium
Team	1	2	3	4	5	6	7	R	H	E
Mexico ◄	0	0	0	0	2	0	2	4	7	1
Panama	1	0	0	0	1	0	0	2	6	2
WP: Brandon Meza (2–0) LP: Juan Crisp (0–2) Sv: Jorge Romero (1); Home runs: MEX: Jorge Romero (1), Brandon Montes (4); PAN: None; Notes: Panama is eliminated. Boxscore

=== Crossover games ===
==== Game A: Texas 5, Australia 2 ====
August 19 Noon EDT Howard J. Lamade Stadium
Team	1	2	3	4	5	6	R	H	E
Australia	0	0	2	0	0	0	2	3	0
Texas ◄	0	0	5	0	0	X	5	8	0
WP: Jacob Garza (1–0) LP: Kieran Hall (0–1) Sv: Juan Sosa (1); Home runs: AUS: None; TX: Jacob Garza (1), Jared Cruz (2); Boxscore

==== Game B: Czech Republic 5, Michigan 3 ====
August 20 1:00 pm EDT Howard J. Lamade Stadium
Team	1	2	3	4	5	6	R	H	E
Michigan	0	2	1	0	0	0	3	8	2
Czech Republic ◄	0	0	1	2	2	X	5	5	1
WP: Robin Vavra (1–0) LP: Antonio Moceri (0–2) Sv: Lukas Hlouch (1); Home runs: MI: Thomas Maxey (1), Antonio Moceri (1); CZE: None; Boxscore

== Single-elimination stage ==
=== International Championship: Japan 3, Mexico 2 ===
August 24 12:30 pm EDT Howard J. Lamade Stadium
Team	1	2	3	4	5	6	R	H	E
Japan ◄	1	0	1	0	0	1	3	6	0
Mexico	0	0	2	0	0	0	2	5	0
WP: Keita Saito (1–0) LP: Jorge Romero (0–1) Sv: Kazuki Ishida (1); Home runs: JPN: Takuma Gomi (2); MEX: Ramon Mendoza (3); Notes: Mexico is eliminated. Boxscore

=== United States Championship: California 12, Connecticut 1 ===
August 24 4:00 pm EDT Howard J. Lamade Stadium
Team	1	2	3	4	5	6	R	H	E
California ◄	3	3	0	0	0	6	12	12	1
Connecticut	1	0	0	0	0	0	1	2	5
WP: Nick Mora (2–0) LP: Chad Knight (0–1); Home runs: CA: Nick Mora (3); CT: None; Notes: Connecticut is eliminated. Boxscore

=== Consolation Game ===
August 25 11:00 am EDT Howard J. Lamade Stadium
Team	1	2	3	4	5	6	R	H	E
Connecticut	2	3	1	0	5	3	14	16	5
Mexico ◄	1	3	4	3	4	X	15	16	1
WP: Martin González (1–0) LP: Alex Reiner (1–2); Home runs: CT: Harry Azadian (2), Matt Brown (2), Chad Knight 2 (3), Mat Stone (1); MEX: Miguel Artalejo (1), Ramon Mendoza (4), Saúl Favela (2), Brandon Montes (5); Boxscore

=== World Championship Game ===
August 25 3:00 pm EDT Howard J. Lamade Stadium
Team	1	2	3	4	5	6	R	H	E
California	2	0	0	2	0	0	4	7	1
Japan ◄	2	0	1	0	3	X	6	8	1
WP: Kyousuke Kobayashi (1–0) LP: Ricky Tibbett (0–1); Home runs: CA: None; JPN: Shunpei Takagi 2 (2); Notes: Japan wins the Little League World Series. Boxscore
