= 2021 Little League World Series results =

Children's baseball competition results

The results of the 2021 Little League World Series were determined during August 19–29, 2021, in South Williamsport, Pennsylvania. A total of 16 teams from the United States were divided into two groups of eight teams, with both groups playing a modified double-elimination tournament. In each group, the last remaining undefeated team faced the last remaining team with one loss, with the winners of those games advancing to play for the Little League World Series championship. The two eight-team tournament brackets were named after Major League Baseball players and National Baseball Hall of Fame inductees Hank Aaron and Tom Seaver, who died in January 2021 and August 2020, respectively.

Double-elimination
Hank Aaron
Hank Aaron	Winner's bracket						
Hank Aaron	(Connecticut) CT 1 (Hawaii) HI 9◄ Linescore	(New Jersey) NJ 2 (Nebraska) NE 5◄ Linescore	(Florida) FL 0 (Michigan) MI 8◄ Linescore	(Texas) TX 6◄ (Washington (state)) WA 0 Linescore	(Hawaii) HI 11◄ (Nebraska) NE 3 (F/7); Linescore	(Texas) TX 5 (Michigan) MI 6◄ Linescore	(Michigan) MI 0 (Hawaii) HI 2◄ Linescore
Hank Aaron	Loser's bracket						
Hank Aaron	(Connecticut) CT 4 (New Jersey) NJ 11◄ Linescore	(Washington (state)) WA 1◄ (Florida) FL 0 Linescore	(Texas) TX 2◄ (New Jersey) NJ 1 Linescore	(Washington (state)) WA 2 (Nebraska) NE 3◄ Linescore	(Nebraska) NE 0 (F/5) (Texas) TX 10◄ Linescore	(Texas) TX 6 (Michigan) MI 15◄ Linescore	
Tom Seaver
Tom Seaver	Winner's bracket						
Tom Seaver	(Tennessee) TN 0 (F/8) (Ohio) OH 1◄ Linescore	(California) CA 10◄ (New Hampshire) NH 2 Linescore	(Pennsylvania) PA 2 (Oregon) OR 8◄ Linescore	(South Dakota) SD 2◄ (Louisiana) LA 0 Linescore	(California) CA 9◄ (Ohio) OH 0 Linescore	(Oregon) OR 0 (South Dakota) SD 3◄ Linescore	(California) CA 0 (South Dakota) SD 1◄ Linescore
Tom Seaver	Loser's bracket						
Tom Seaver	(Tennessee) TN 1 (New Hampshire) NH 4◄ Linescore	(Pennsylvania) PA 3 (Louisiana) LA 5◄ Linescore	(New Hampshire) NH 14◄ (Oregon) OR 6 Linescore	(Ohio) OH 8◄ (Louisiana) LA 2 Linescore	(Ohio) OH 4◄ (New Hampshire) NH 3 Linescore	(Ohio) OH 4◄ (California) CA 2 Linescore	
Single-elimination
Tom Seaver championship	Ohio 5◄ South Dakota 2 Linescore						
Hank Aaron championship	Michigan 2◄ Hawaii 1 Linescore						
Consolation game	South Dakota 0 Hawaii 5◄ Linescore						
World championship game	Ohio 2 Michigan 5◄ Linescore						

== Double-elimination stage ==
=== Hank Aaron ===
Upper round 1	Upper round 2	Upper final	Final
August 19 – Game 1
Hawaii	9
August 22 – Game 14 (F/7)
Connecticut	1
Hawaii	11
August 19 – Game 3
Nebraska	3
Nebraska	5
August 25 – Game 24
New Jersey	2
Hawaii	2
August 20 – Game 6
Michigan	0
Michigan	8
August 23 – Game 15
Florida	0
Michigan	6
August 20 – Game 8
Texas	5
(Washington (state)) Washington	0	August 28 – Hank Aaron championship
Texas	6	Hawaii	1
Michigan	2
Lower round 1	Lower round 2	Lower round 3	Lower final
August 24 – Game 17
August 21 – Game 10	Texas	2	August 26 – Game 25
Connecticut	4	New Jersey	1	August 25 – Game 22 (F/5)	Michigan	15
New Jersey	11	Texas	10	Texas	6
August 23 – Game 20	Nebraska	0
August 21 – Game 11	Nebraska	3
Florida	0	Washington	2
Washington	1

==== Winner's bracket ====
===== Game 1: Hawaii 9, Connecticut 1 =====
August 19 1:00 pm EDT Volunteer Stadium
Team	1	2	3	4	5	6	R	H	E
Connecticut	1	0	0	0	0	0	1	2	4
Hawaii ◄	0	4	0	4	1	X	9	9	4
WP: Ryan Keanu (1–0) LP: Arlen Peyman (0–1); Home runs: CT: Arlen Peyman (1); HI: None; Boxscore

===== Game 3: Nebraska 5, New Jersey 2 =====
August 19 5:00 pm EDT Volunteer Stadium
Team	1	2	3	4	5	6	R	H	E
New Jersey	0	0	0	0	1	1	2	5	0
Nebraska ◄	2	1	0	2	0	X	5	11	2
WP: Hunter Nepple (1–0) LP: Cole Garrison (0–1) Sv: Kowen Rader (1); Boxscore

===== Game 6: Michigan 8, Florida 0 =====
August 20 3:00 pm EDT Howard J. Lamade Stadium
Team	1	2	3	4	5	6	R	H	E
Florida	0	0	0	0	0	0	0	5	1
Michigan ◄	3	0	0	0	5	X	8	12	0
WP: Ethan Van Belle (1–0) LP: Frankie Brancaleone (0–1); Boxscore

===== Game 8: Texas 6, Washington 0 =====
August 20 7:00 pm EDT Howard J. Lamade Stadium
Team	1	2	3	4	5	6	R	H	E
Texas ◄	0	1	0	0	0	5	6	6	0
Washington	0	0	0	0	0	0	0	2	1
WP: Myles McCarty (1–0) LP: Sanath Chari (0–1); Boxscore

===== Game 14: Hawaii 11, Nebraska 3 =====
August 22 11:00 am EDT Howard J. Lamade Stadium
Team	1	2	3	4	5	6	7	R	H	E
Hawaii ◄	3	0	0	0	0	0	8	11	13	1
Nebraska	0	0	0	0	0	3	0	3	5	2
WP: Micah Bennett (1–0) LP: Benjamin Wibbels (0–1); Home runs: HI: Ryan Keanu (1); NE: Hunter Nepple (1); Boxscore

===== Game 15: Michigan 6, Texas 5 =====
August 23 1:00 pm EDT Volunteer Stadium
Team	1	2	3	4	5	6	R	H	E
Texas	2	3	0	0	0	0	5	5	1
Michigan ◄	0	4	0	0	2	X	6	9	2
WP: Gavin Ulin (1–0) LP: Cason Parrish (0–1) Sv: Cameron Thorning (1); Home runs: TX: None; MI: Cameron Thorning (1); Boxscore

===== Game 24: Hawaii 2, Michigan 0 =====
August 25 7:30 pm EDT Howard J. Lamade Stadium
Team	1	2	3	4	5	6	R	H	E
Michigan	0	0	0	0	0	0	0	1	1
Hawaii ◄	1	1	0	0	0	X	2	4	0
WP: Ryan Keanu (2–0) LP: Ethan Van Belle (1–1); Boxscore

==== Loser's bracket ====
===== Game 10: New Jersey 11, Connecticut 4 =====
August 21 3:00 pm EDT Howard J. Lamade Stadium
Team	1	2	3	4	5	6	R	H	E
Connecticut	1	0	3	0	0	0	4	5	0
New Jersey ◄	1	0	2	0	8	X	11	12	0
WP: Dominic Roma (1–0) LP: Eli Bucko (0–1); Home runs: CT: Jacob Budarz (1); NJ: Joey DiMeo (1); Notes: Connecticut is eliminated. Boxscore

===== Game 11: Washington 1, Florida 0 =====
August 21 6:00 pm EDT Volunteer Stadium
Team	1	2	3	4	5	6	R	H	E
Washington ◄	0	0	0	0	1	0	1	4	1
Florida	0	0	0	0	0	0	0	0	1
WP: Eli Jones (1–0) LP: Preston Sullivan (0–1); Notes: Florida is eliminated. Boxscore

===== Game 17: Texas 2, New Jersey 1 =====
August 24 3:00 pm EDT Howard J. Lamade Stadium
Team	1	2	3	4	5	6	R	H	E
Texas ◄	1	1	0	0	0	0	2	5	2
New Jersey	0	0	0	0	1	0	1	2	0
WP: Dylan Regala (1–0) LP: Cole Garrison (0–2) Sv: Myles McCarty (1); Notes: New Jersey is eliminated. Boxscore

===== Game 20: Nebraska 3, Washington 2 =====
August 23 7:00 pm EDT Howard J. Lamade Stadium
Team	1	2	3	4	5	6	R	H	E
Washington	0	0	0	2	0	0	2	2	0
Nebraska ◄	0	0	3	0	0	X	3	8	2
WP: Hunter Nepple (2–0) LP: Sanath Chari (0–2); Notes: Washington is eliminated. Boxscore

===== Game 22: Texas 10, Nebraska 0 =====
August 25 3:00 pm EDT Howard J. Lamade Stadium
Team	1	2	3	4	5	6	R	H	E
Nebraska	0	0	0	0	0	–	0	2	2
Texas ◄	0	0	1	1	8	–	10	10	0
WP: Carter Nelson (1–0) LP: Owen Ablott (0–1); Home runs: NE: None; TX: Dylan Regala (1); Notes: Completed early due to the run rule. Nebraska is eliminated. Boxscore

===== Game 25: Michigan 15, Texas 6 =====
August 26 3:00 pm EDT Howard J. Lamade Stadium
Team	1	2	3	4	5	6	R	H	E
Texas	0	0	0	6	0	0	6	5	4
Michigan ◄	3	0	8	0	4	X	15	14	1
WP: Jackson Surma (1–0) LP: Landry Pate (0–1) Sv: Max LaForest (1); Home runs: TX: None; MI: Cameron Thorning (2); Notes: Texas is eliminated. Boxscore

=== Tom Seaver ===
Upper round 1	Upper round 2	Upper final	Final
August 19 – Game 2 (F/8)
Tennessee	0
August 22 – Game 13
Ohio	1
Ohio	0
August 19 – Game 4
California	9
New Hampshire	2
August 25 – Game 23
California	10
California	0
August 20 – Game 5
South Dakota	1
Pennsylvania	2
August 23 – Game 16
Oregon	8
Oregon	0
August 20 – Game 7
South Dakota	3
Louisiana	0	August 28 – Tom Seaver championship
South Dakota	2	South Dakota	2
Ohio	5
Lower round 1	Lower round 2	Lower round 3	Lower final
August 24 – Game 18
August 21 – Game 9	Oregon	6	August 26 – Game 26
Tennessee	1	New Hampshire	14	August 25 – Game 21	California	2
New Hampshire	4	New Hampshire	3	Ohio	4
August 23 – Game 19	Ohio	4
August 21 – Game 12	Ohio	8
Pennsylvania	3	Louisiana	2
Louisiana	5

==== Winner's bracket ====
===== Game 2: Ohio 1, Tennessee 0 =====
August 19 3:00 pm EDT Howard J. Lamade Stadium
Team	1	2	3	4	5	6	7	8	R	H	E
Tennessee	0	0	0	0	0	0	0	0	0	2	1
Ohio ◄	0	0	0	0	0	0	0	1	1	2	2
WP: Cooper Oden (1–0) LP: William Dreussi (0–1); Boxscore

===== Game 4: California 10, New Hampshire 2 =====
August 19 7:00 pm EDT Howard J. Lamade Stadium
Team	1	2	3	4	5	6	R	H	E
California ◄	0	4	0	0	4	2	10	8	2
New Hampshire	0	0	1	0	0	1	2	5	2
WP: Gibson Turner (1–0) LP: Mason DeVall (0–1); Home runs: CA: None; NH: Tristan Lucier (1); Boxscore

===== Game 5: Oregon 8, Pennsylvania 2 =====
August 20 1:00 pm EDT Volunteer Stadium
Team	1	2	3	4	5	6	R	H	E
Pennsylvania	1	0	0	1	0	0	2	3	6
Oregon ◄	0	0	3	5	0	X	8	3	2
WP: Chase Kelly (1–0) LP: Jalen Bowman (0–1) Sv: Ethan Uecker (1); Home runs: PA: None; OR: Ben Robertson (1); Boxscore

===== Game 7: South Dakota 2, Louisiana 0 =====
August 20 5:00 pm EDT Volunteer Stadium
Team	1	2	3	4	5	6	R	H	E
South Dakota ◄	1	0	0	0	0	1	2	4	0
Louisiana	0	0	0	0	0	0	0	0	1
WP: Gavin Weir (1–0) LP: Nick Brown (0–1) Sv: Cason Mediger (1); Boxscore

===== Game 13: California 9, Ohio 0 =====
August 22 9:00 am EDT Volunteer Stadium
Team	1	2	3	4	5	6	R	H	E
California ◄	0	1	4	0	0	4	9	11	0
Ohio	0	0	0	0	0	0	0	1	1
WP: Xavier Navarro (1–0) LP: Cooper Oden (1–1); Home runs: CA: Grant Hays 2 (2); OH: None; Boxscore

===== Game 16: South Dakota 3, Oregon 0 =====
August 23 3:00 pm EDT Howard J. Lamade Stadium
Team	1	2	3	4	5	6	R	H	E
Oregon	0	0	0	0	0	0	0	1	0
South Dakota ◄	0	0	0	0	3	X	3	6	0
WP: Maddux Munson (1–0) LP: Chase Kelly (1–1); Home runs: OR: None; SD: Gavin Weir (1); Boxscore

===== Game 23: South Dakota 1, California 0 =====
August 25 5:00 pm EDT Volunteer Stadium
Team	1	2	3	4	5	6	R	H	E
California	0	0	0	0	0	0	0	0	0
South Dakota ◄	1	0	0	0	0	0	1	3	0
WP: Gavin Weir (2–0) LP: Gibson Turner (1–1); Boxscore

==== Loser's bracket ====
===== Game 9: New Hampshire 4, Tennessee 1 =====
August 21 1:00 pm EDT Volunteer Stadium
Team	1	2	3	4	5	6	R	H	E
Tennessee	0	0	0	1	0	0	1	2	2
New Hampshire ◄	2	0	0	2	0	X	4	7	1
WP: Tristan Lucier (1–0) LP: Ryan Newell (0–1) Sv: Keith Townsend (1); Notes: Tennessee is eliminated. Boxscore

===== Game 12: Louisiana 5, Pennsylvania 3 =====
August 21 8:00 pm EDT Howard J. Lamade Stadium
Team	1	2	3	4	5	6	R	H	E
Pennsylvania	0	0	0	2	0	1	3	5	1
Louisiana ◄	2	1	1	0	1	X	5	7	0
WP: Isaac Boudreaux (1–0) LP: Sam Buckley (0–1) Sv: Cole Schexnaider (1); Home runs: PA: Sam Buckley (1); LA: None; Notes: Pennsylvania is eliminated. Boxscore

===== Game 18: New Hampshire 14, Oregon 6 =====
August 24 7:30 pm EDT Howard J. Lamade Stadium
Team	1	2	3	4	5	6	R	H	E
New Hampshire ◄	2	6	1	1	2	2	14	16	4
Oregon	0	6	0	0	0	0	6	8	1
WP: Mason DeVall (1–1) LP: Ethan Uecker (0–1); Home runs: NH: Mason DeVall (1), Calen Lucier (1), Tristan Lucier (2), Ryson Michaud (1); OR: None; Notes: Oregon is eliminated. Boxscore

===== Game 19: Ohio 8, Louisiana 2 =====
August 23 5:00 pm EDT Volunteer Stadium
Team	1	2	3	4	5	6	R	H	E
Ohio ◄	1	2	0	5	0	0	8	8	0
Louisiana	1	1	0	0	0	0	2	3	0
WP: Kaleb Harden (1–0) LP: Cooper Hawkins (0–1); Home runs: OH: J. J. Vogel (1); LA: None; Notes: Louisiana is eliminated. Boxscore

===== Game 21: Ohio 4, New Hampshire 3 =====
August 25 1:00 pm EDT Volunteer Stadium
Team	1	2	3	4	5	6	R	H	E
Ohio ◄	0	0	2	0	0	2	4	9	0
New Hampshire	0	0	0	0	0	3	3	3	1
WP: J. J. Vogel (1–0) LP: Keith Townsend (0–1) Sv: Kaleb Harden (1); Home runs: OH: None; NH: Calen Lucier (2); Notes: New Hampshire is eliminated. Boxscore

===== Game 26: Ohio 4, California 2 =====
August 26 7:00 pm EDT Howard J. Lamade Stadium
Team	1	2	3	4	5	6	R	H	E
Ohio ◄	0	0	0	1	3	0	4	5	1
California	0	0	2	0	0	0	2	7	0
WP: Noah Davidson (1–0) LP: Dominic Golia (0–1); Notes: California is eliminated. Boxscore

== Single-elimination stage ==
=== Tom Seaver championship: Ohio 5, South Dakota 2 ===
August 28 12:30 pm EDT Howard J. Lamade Stadium
Team	1	2	3	4	5	6	R	H	E
Ohio ◄	0	4	0	0	1	0	5	8	0
South Dakota	0	0	1	0	0	1	2	8	2
WP: Cooper Oden (2–1) LP: Maddux Munson (1–1) Sv: Kaleb Harden (2); Notes: South Dakota is eliminated. Boxscore

=== Hank Aaron championship: Michigan 2, Hawaii 1 ===
August 28 3:30 pm EDT Howard J. Lamade Stadium
Team	1	2	3	4	5	6	R	H	E
Michigan ◄	2	0	0	0	0	0	2	3	1
Hawaii	0	0	1	0	0	0	1	2	0
WP: Jakob Furkas (1–0) LP: Micah Bennett (1–1); Home runs: MI: Cameron Thorning (3); HI: None; Notes: Hawaii is eliminated. Boxscore

=== Consolation game: Hawaii 5, South Dakota 0 ===
August 29 10:00 am EDT Howard J. Lamade Stadium
Team	1	2	3	4	5	6	R	H	E
South Dakota	0	0	0	0	0	0	0	7	0
Hawaii ◄	4	0	0	0	1	X	5	6	0
WP: Pele Payanal (1–0) LP: Cason Mediger (0–1) Sv: Ryan Keanu (1); Home runs: SD: None; HI: Kekoa Payanal (1); Boxscore

=== World championship game: Michigan 5, Ohio 2 ===
August 29 3:00 pm EDT Howard J. Lamade Stadium
Team	1	2	3	4	5	6	R	H	E
Ohio	0	1	0	0	0	1	2	6	2
Michigan ◄	3	0	0	0	2	X	5	8	0
WP: Ethan Van Belle (2–1) LP: Chance Retherford (0–1) Sv: Gavin Ulin (1); Boxscore
