= 2023 Little League World Series results =

Children's baseball tournament results

The results of the 2023 Little League World Series were determined between August 16 and August 27, 2023, in South Williamsport, Pennsylvania. Twenty teams were divided into two groups, one with ten teams from the United States and another with ten international teams, with both groups playing a modified double-elimination tournament. In each group, the last remaining undefeated team faced the last remaining team with one loss, with the winners of those games advancing to play for the Little League World Series championship. California, the United States champions, defeated Curaçao, the international champions, 6–5 to win the 2023 championship.

Double-elimination
United States
United States	Winner's bracket								
United States	(Nevada) NV 1 (Rhode Island) RI 3◄ Linescore	(Texas) TX 2◄ (Pennsylvania) PA 1 Linescore	(Washington (state)) WA 10◄ (Maine) ME 0 (F/4); Linescore	(Ohio) OH 3 (F/4) (California) CA 4◄ Linescore	(Tennessee) TN 8◄ (Rhode Island) RI 1 Linescore	(Texas) TX 6◄ (North Dakota) ND 2 Linescore	(Tennessee) TN 2 (Washington (state)) WA 6◄ Linescore	(Texas) TX 3◄ (California) CA 1 Linescore	(Texas) TX 1◄ (Washington (state)) WA 0 (F/9); Linescore
United States	Loser's bracket								
United States	(Pennsylvania) PA 5◄ (Maine) ME 3 Linescore	(Nevada) NV 13◄ (Ohio) OH 2 (F/4); Linescore	(Rhode Island) RI 7◄ (Pennsylvania) PA 2 Linescore	(North Dakota) ND 1 (Nevada) NV 7◄ Linescore	(Tennessee) TN 2◄ (Nevada) NV 1 Linescore	(California) CA 9◄ (Rhode Island) RI 3 Linescore	(Tennessee) TN 3 (California) CA 5◄ Linescore	(Washington (state)) WA 1 (California) CA 2◄ Linescore	
International
International	Winner's bracket								
International	(Czech Republic) CZE 0 (Panama) PAN 4◄ Linescore	(Japan) JPN 1◄ (Cuba) CUB 0 Linescore	(Australia) AUS 1 (Curaçao) CUR 2◄ Linescore	(Chinese Taipei) TPE 6◄ (Canada) CAN 0 Linescore	(Venezuela) VEN 4◄ PAN 3 Linescore	JPN 6◄ (Mexico) MEX 1 Linescore	CUR 2◄ VEN 1 Linescore	JPN 0 (F/4); TPE 10◄ Linescore	TPE 9◄ CUR 1 Linescore
International	Loser's bracket								
International	AUS 1 (F/5); CUB 11◄ Linescore	CAN 3◄ CZE 0 Linescore	PAN 3◄ CUB 2 Linescore	CAN 1 MEX 10◄ Linescore	MEX 3◄ VEN 1 Linescore	JPN 5◄ PAN 4 Linescore	JPN 0 MEX 2◄ Linescore	CUR 4◄ MEX 2 Linescore	
Single-elimination
International championship	Chinese Taipei 0 Curaçao 2◄ Linescore								
United States championship	Texas 1 California 6◄ Linescore								
Third place game	Texas 0 (F/4); Chinese Taipei 10◄ Linescore								
World championship game	Curaçao 5 California 6◄ Linescore								

== Double-elimination stage ==
=== United States ===
Upper round 1	Upper round 2	Upper round 3	Upper final	Final
August 18 – Game 10
August 16 – Game 2	Tennessee	8
August 21 – Game 22
Nevada	1	Rhode Island	1
Tennessee	2
Rhode Island	3	August 17 – Game 6 (F/4)
Washington	6
(Washington (state)) Washington	10
August 23 – Game 30 (F/9)
Maine	0
Washington	0
August 18 – Game 12
Texas	1
August 16 – Game 4	North Dakota	2
August 21 – Game 24
Texas	2	Texas	6
Texas	3
Pennsylvania	1	August 17 – Game 8 (F/4)
California	1
California	4	August 26 – U.S. Championship
Ohio	3	Texas	1
California	6
Lower round 1	Lower round 2	Lower round 3	Lower round 4	Lower final
August 22 – Game 28
August 20 – Game 18	California	9	August 24 – Game 34
August 19 – Game 14	Rhode Island	7	Rhode Island	3	August 23 – Game 32	Washington	1
Pennsylvania	5	Pennsylvania	2	California	5	California	2
Maine	3	August 22 – Game 26	Tennessee	3
August 20 – Game 20	Tennessee	2
August 19 – Game 16 (F/4)	North Dakota	1	Nevada	1
Nevada	13	Nevada	7
Ohio	2

==== Winner's bracket ====
===== Game 2: Rhode Island 3, Nevada 1 =====
August 16 3:00 pm EDT Howard J. Lamade Stadium
Team	1	2	3	4	5	6	R	H	E
Nevada	0	0	0	0	1	0	1	3	2
Rhode Island ◄	1	0	0	2	0	X	3	1	0
WP: Connor Curtis (1–0) LP: Nolan Gifford (0–1) Sv: Brayden Castellone (1); Home runs: NV: Jaxson McMullin (1); RI: None

===== Game 4: Texas 2, Pennsylvania 1 =====
August 16 7:00 pm EDT Howard J. Lamade Stadium
Team	1	2	3	4	5	6	R	H	E
Texas ◄	0	0	0	2	0	0	2	5	1
Pennsylvania	0	0	0	0	1	0	1	3	2
WP: DJ Jablonski (1–0) LP: Austin Crowley (0–1)

===== Game 6: Washington 10, Maine 0 =====
August 17 3:00 pm EDT Howard J. Lamade Stadium
Team	1	2	3	4	5	6	R	H	E
Washington ◄	0	2	6	2	–	–	10	9	0
Maine	0	0	0	0	–	–	0	1	4
WP: Trey Kirchoff (1–0) LP: Kayden Oliver (1–0); Notes: Completed early due to the run rule.

===== Game 8: California 4, Ohio 3 =====
August 17 7:00 pm EDT Howard J. Lamade Stadium
Team	1	2	3	4	5	6	R	H	E
Ohio	1	2	0	0	–	–	3	3	0
California ◄	1	0	3	0	–	–	4	3	1
WP: Declan McRoberts (1–0) LP: Kevin Klingerman (0–1); Home runs: OH: None; CA: Louis Lappe (1), Brody Brooks (1); Notes: Completed early due to a rain delay extending past Little League's curfew regulations.

===== Game 10: Tennessee 8, Rhode Island 1 =====
August 18 3:00 pm EDT Howard J. Lamade Stadium
Team	1	2	3	4	5	6	R	H	E
Tennessee ◄	3	0	1	1	1	2	8	11	0
Rhode Island	0	0	0	1	0	0	1	3	1
WP: Grayson May (1–0) LP: Brayden Castellone (0–1)

===== Game 12: Texas 6, North Dakota 2 =====
August 18 7:00 pm EDT Howard J. Lamade Stadium
Team	1	2	3	4	5	6	R	H	E
Texas ◄	0	2	0	4	0	0	6	2	1
North Dakota	0	2	0	0	0	0	2	3	1
WP: Michael Raven (1–0) LP: Cash Martinez (0–1) Sv: Easton Benge (1); Notes: This is the first appearance for a team from North Dakota in Little League World Series history.

===== Game 22: Washington 6, Tennessee 2 =====
August 21 3:00 pm EDT Howard J. Lamade Stadium
Team	1	2	3	4	5	6	R	H	E
Tennessee	0	0	2	0	0	0	2	6	3
Washington ◄	0	5	0	0	1	X	6	4	1
WP: Trey Kirchoff (2–0) LP: Stella Weaver (0–1) Sv: Larson Eng (1)

===== Game 24: Texas 3, California 1 =====
August 21 7:00 pm EDT Howard J. Lamade Stadium
Team	1	2	3	4	5	6	R	H	E
Texas ◄	2	0	0	1	0	0	3	5	1
California	1	0	0	0	0	0	1	4	0
WP: DJ Jablonski (2–0) LP: Declan McRoberts (1–1) Sv: Easton Ondruch (1); Home runs: TX: DJ Jablonski (1); CA: Louis Lappe (2)

===== Game 30: Texas 1, Washington 0 =====
August 23 3:00 pm EDT Howard J. Lamade Stadium
Team	1	2	3	4	5	6	7	8	9	R	H	E
Texas ◄	0	0	0	0	0	0	0	0	1	1	5	0
Washington	0	0	0	0	0	0	0	0	0	0	4	2
WP: Easton Ondruch (1–0) LP: Owen Luke (0–1); Boxscore

==== Loser's bracket ====
===== Game 14: Pennsylvania 5, Maine 3 =====
August 19 2:00 pm EDT Howard J. Lamade Stadium
Team	1	2	3	4	5	6	R	H	E
Pennsylvania ◄	3	0	0	0	0	2	5	7	2
Maine	2	0	0	1	0	0	3	6	4
WP: Trevor Skowronek (1–0) LP: Mason Amergian (0–1); Notes: Maine is eliminated.

===== Game 16: Nevada 13, Ohio 2 =====
August 19 6:00 pm EDT Howard J. Lamade Stadium
Team	1	2	3	4	5	6	R	H	E
Nevada ◄	4	6	1	2	–	–	13	10	1
Ohio	0	0	0	2	–	–	2	5	3
WP: David Edwards (1–0) LP: Owen Nardell (0–1); Home runs: NV: Nolan Gifford (1); OH: None; Notes: Completed early due to the run rule. Ohio is eliminated.

===== Game 18: Rhode Island 7, Pennsylvania 2 =====
August 20 11:00 am EDT Howard J. Lamade Stadium
Team	1	2	3	4	5	6	R	H	E
Rhode Island ◄	2	0	0	0	0	5	7	7	0
Pennsylvania	0	0	1	0	1	0	2	5	1
WP: Brayden Castellone (1–1) LP: Trevor Skowronek (1–1); Notes: Pennsylvania is eliminated.

===== Game 20: Nevada 7, North Dakota 1 =====
August 20 2:00 pm EDT Howard J. Lamade Stadium
Team	1	2	3	4	5	6	R	H	E
North Dakota	0	1	0	0	0	0	1	4	1
Nevada ◄	2	0	0	2	3	X	7	8	1
WP: Jaxson McMullin (1–0) LP: Reese Evenson (0–1); Home runs: ND: None; NV: Nolan Gifford (2); Notes: North Dakota is eliminated.

===== Game 26: Tennessee 2, Nevada 1 =====
August 22 3:00 pm EDT Howard J. Lamade Stadium
Team	1	2	3	4	5	6	R	H	E
Tennessee ◄	0	0	0	1	1	0	2	5	0
Nevada	0	0	0	0	1	0	1	2	1
WP: Lucas McCauley (1–0) LP: Nolan Gifford (0–2); Notes: Nevada is eliminated.

===== Game 28: California 9, Rhode Island 3 =====
August 22 7:00 pm EDT Howard J. Lamade Stadium
Team	1	2	3	4	5	6	R	H	E
California ◄	2	2	3	0	2	0	9	9	1
Rhode Island	0	0	0	0	0	3	3	4	2
WP: Louis Lappe (1–0) LP: Connor Curtis (1–1); Home runs: CA: Brody Brooks (2); RI: None; Notes: Rhode Island is eliminated.

===== Game 32: California 5, Tennessee 3 =====
August 23 7:00 pm EDT Howard J. Lamade Stadium
Team	1	2	3	4	5	6	R	H	E
Tennessee	0	0	0	2	1	0	3	4	1
California ◄	1	0	2	0	2	X	5	11	0
WP: Max Baker (1–0) LP: Nash Carter (0–1) Sv: Brody Brooks (1); Home runs: TN: Lucas McCauley (1); CA: Louis Lappe (3); Notes: Tennessee is eliminated.

===== Game 34: California 2, Washington 1 =====
August 24 7:00 pm EDT Howard J. Lamade Stadium
Team	1	2	3	4	5	6	R	H	E
Washington	0	0	0	1	0	0	1	6	1
California ◄	1	1	0	0	0	X	2	8	1
WP: Declan McRoberts (2–1) LP: Trey Kirchoff (2–1) Sv: Brody Brooks (2); Notes: Washington is eliminated.

=== International ===
Upper round 1	Upper round 2	Upper round 3	Upper final	Final
August 18 – Game 9
August 16 – Game 1	Venezuela	4
August 21 – Game 21
Czech Republic	0	Panama	3
Venezuela	1
Panama	4	August 17 – Game 5
Curaçao	2
Curaçao	2
August 23 – Game 29
Australia	1
Curaçao	1
August 18 – Game 11
Chinese Taipei	9
August 16 – Game 3	Mexico	1
August 21 – Game 23 (F/4)
Japan	1	Japan	6
Japan	0
Cuba	0	August 17 – Game 7
Chinese Taipei	10
Canada	0	August 26 – Int'l Championship
Chinese Taipei	6	Chinese Taipei	0
Curaçao	2
Lower round 1	Lower round 2	Lower round 3	Lower round 4	Lower final
August 22 – Game 27
August 20 – Game 17	Japan	5	August 24 – Game 33
August 19 – Game 13 (F/5)	Panama	3	Panama	4	August 23 – Game 31	Curaçao	4
Cuba	11	Cuba	2	Japan	0	Mexico	2
Australia	1	August 22 – Game 25	Mexico	2
August 20 – Game 19	Venezuela	1
August 19 – Game 15	Canada	1	Mexico	3
Czech Republic	0	Mexico	10
Canada	3

==== Winner's bracket ====
===== Game 1: Panama 4, Czech Republic 0 =====
August 16 1:00 pm EDT Volunteer Stadium
Team	1	2	3	4	5	6	R	H	E
Czech Republic	0	0	0	0	0	0	0	0	0
Panama ◄	0	0	0	4	0	X	4	5	1
WP: Omar Vargas (1–0) LP: Dominik Řezníček (0–1); Home runs: CZE: None; PAN: Omar Vargas (1)

===== Game 3: Japan 1, Cuba 0 =====
August 16 5:00 pm EDT Volunteer Stadium
Team	1	2	3	4	5	6	R	H	E
Japan ◄	1	0	0	0	0	0	1	1	0
Cuba	0	0	0	0	0	0	0	0	0
WP: Hinata Uchigaki (1–0) LP: Luis Gurriel (0–1); Notes: This is the first appearance for a team from Cuba in Little League World Series history.

===== Game 5: Curaçao 2, Australia 1 =====
August 17 1:00 pm EDT Volunteer Stadium
Team	1	2	3	4	5	6	R	H	E
Australia	0	0	1	0	0	0	1	4	1
Curaçao ◄	0	1	0	0	1	X	2	5	1
WP: Jay-Dlynn Wiel (1–0) LP: Adrian Jankuloski (0–1)

===== Game 7: Chinese Taipei 6, Canada 0 =====
August 17 5:00 pm EDT Volunteer Stadium
Team	1	2	3	4	5	6	R	H	E
Chinese Taipei ◄	2	1	3	0	0	0	6	9	0
Canada	0	0	0	0	0	0	0	0	2
WP: Chiu Tse-Wei (1–0) LP: Jaxon Weir (0–1); Home runs: TPE: Fan Chen-Jun (1); CAN: None; Notes: Chinese Taipei used three pitchers to combine for a perfect game.

===== Game 9: Venezuela 4, Panama 3 =====
August 18 1:00 pm EDT Volunteer Stadium
Team	1	2	3	4	5	6	R	H	E
Venezuela ◄	0	2	2	0	0	0	4	2	2
Panama	2	0	0	0	1	0	3	6	1
WP: Luis Rangel (1–0) LP: Rubén Canto (0–1) Sv: Osman Basabe (1)

===== Game 11: Japan 6, Mexico 1 =====
August 18 5:00 pm EDT Volunteer Stadium
Team	1	2	3	4	5	6	R	H	E
Japan ◄	2	1	1	2	0	0	6	8	1
Mexico	1	0	0	0	0	0	1	3	1
WP: Akito Masuda (1–0) LP: Jorge Villa (0–1)

===== Game 21: Curaçao 2, Venezuela 1 =====
August 21 1:00 pm EDT Volunteer Stadium
Team	1	2	3	4	5	6	R	H	E
Curaçao ◄	0	0	0	0	0	2	2	5	0
Venezuela	0	1	0	0	0	0	1	5	0
WP: Jay-Dlynn Wiel (2–0) LP: Osman Basabe (0–1); Home runs: CUR: Nasir El-Ossaïs (1); VEN: None

===== Game 23: Chinese Taipei 10, Japan 0 =====
August 21 5:00 pm EDT Volunteer Stadium
Team	1	2	3	4	5	6	R	H	E
Japan	0	0	0	0	–	–	0	0	1
Chinese Taipei ◄	2	0	6	2	–	–	10	4	0
WP: Fan Chen-Jun (1–0) LP: Akito Masuda (1–1) Sv: Chiu Tse-Wei (1); Notes: Completed early due to the run rule.

===== Game 29: Chinese Taipei 9, Curaçao 1 =====
August 23 1:00 pm EDT Volunteer Stadium
Team	1	2	3	4	5	6	R	H	E
Chinese Taipei ◄	1	0	0	2	6	0	9	6	0
Curaçao	1	0	0	0	0	0	1	2	1
WP: Cai Yuan-Hao (1–0) LP: Sean Serverie (0–1); Home runs: TPE: None; CUR: Jay-Dlynn Wiel (1)

==== Loser's bracket ====
===== Game 13: Cuba 11, Australia 1 =====
August 19 12:00 pm EDT Volunteer Stadium
Team	1	2	3	4	5	6	R	H	E
Australia	0	1	0	0	0	–	1	2	7
Cuba ◄	3	0	0	3	5	–	11	12	2
WP: Samuel Palencia (1–0) LP: Jet Creamer (0–1); Notes: Completed early due to the run rule. This is the first win for a team from Cuba in Little League World Series history. Australia is eliminated.

===== Game 15: Canada 3, Czech Republic 0 =====
August 19 4:00 pm EDT Volunteer Stadium
Team	1	2	3	4	5	6	R	H	E
Canada ◄	0	0	0	3	0	0	3	8	0
Czech Republic	0	0	0	0	0	0	0	3	0
WP: Jaxon Weir (1–1) LP: Kryštof Šilar (0–1); Notes: Czech Republic is eliminated.

===== Game 17: Panama 3, Cuba 2 =====
August 20 9:00 am EDT Volunteer Stadium
Team	1	2	3	4	5	6	R	H	E
Panama ◄	1	0	0	2	0	0	3	6	1
Cuba	0	0	0	0	0	2	2	3	1
WP: Omar Vargas (2–0) LP: Ismael Ortega (0–1) Sv: Allan Rodríguez (1); Home runs: PAN: None; CUB: Luis Aparicio (1); Notes: Cuba is eliminated.

===== Game 19: Mexico 10, Canada 1 =====
August 20 1:00 pm EDT Volunteer Stadium
Team	1	2	3	4	5	6	R	H	E
Canada	1	0	0	0	0	0	1	3	2
Mexico ◄	0	0	1	8	1	X	10	11	0
WP: Jorge Cota (1–0) LP: Nickson Hjelsing (0–1); Notes: Canada is eliminated.

===== Game 25: Mexico 3, Venezuela 1 =====
August 22 1:00 pm EDT Volunteer Stadium
Team	1	2	3	4	5	6	R	H	E
Mexico ◄	0	0	0	0	3	0	3	8	2
Venezuela	0	0	1	0	0	0	1	2	1
WP: Gael Leyva (1–0) LP: Adrian Soto (0–1); Notes: Venezuela is eliminated.

===== Game 27: Japan 5, Panama 4 =====
August 22 5:00 pm EDT Volunteer Stadium
Team	1	2	3	4	5	6	R	H	E
Japan ◄	2	0	0	0	1	2	5	6	4
Panama	0	0	0	4	0	0	4	2	2
WP: Hinata Uchigaki (2–0) LP: Allan Rodríguez (0–1); Notes: Panama is eliminated.

===== Game 31: Mexico 2, Japan 0 =====
August 23 5:00 pm EDT Volunteer Stadium
Team	1	2	3	4	5	6	R	H	E
Japan	0	0	0	0	0	0	0	3	0
Mexico ◄	0	1	0	0	1	X	2	5	0
WP: Bernardo Partida (1–0) LP: Yohei Yamaguchi (0–1); Notes: Japan is eliminated.

===== Game 33: Curaçao 4, Mexico 2 =====
August 24 3:00 pm EDT Howard J. Lamade Stadium
Team	1	2	3	4	5	6	R	H	E
Curaçao ◄	0	0	0	1	0	3	4	4	2
Mexico	0	0	1	0	0	1	2	5	3
WP: Jay-Dlynn Wiel (3–0) LP: Jamil Mandujano (0–1) Sv: Shemar Sophia Jacobus (1); Notes: Mexico is eliminated.

== Single-elimination stage ==
=== International championship: Curaçao 2, Chinese Taipei 0 ===
August 26 12:30 pm EDT Howard J. Lamade Stadium
Team	1	2	3	4	5	6	R	H	E
Chinese Taipei	0	0	0	0	0	0	0	1	2
Curaçao ◄	0	0	0	2	0	X	2	2	1
WP: Helmir Helmijr (1–0) LP: Fan Chen-Jun (1–1) Sv: Jay-Dlynn Wiel (1); Notes: Chinese Taipei is eliminated. Boxscore

=== United States championship: California 6, Texas 1 ===
August 26 3:30 pm EDT Howard J. Lamade Stadium
Team	1	2	3	4	5	6	R	H	E
Texas	0	0	0	0	1	0	1	3	0
California ◄	1	0	2	0	3	X	6	8	1
WP: Louis Lappe (2–0) LP: DJ Jablonski (2–1); Home runs: TX: None; CA: Brody Brooks (3), Louis Lappe (4); Notes: Texas is eliminated. Boxscore

=== Third place game: Chinese Taipei 10, Texas 0 ===
August 27 11:00 am EDT Howard J. Lamade Stadium
Team	1	2	3	4	5	6	R	H	E
Texas	0	0	0	0	–	–	0	4	0
Chinese Taipei ◄	5	0	5	X	–	–	10	10	0
WP: Fan Chen-Jun (2–1) LP: Colten Georgi (0–1); Home runs: TX: None; TPE: Fan Chen-Jun (2); Notes: Completed early due to the run rule. Boxscore

=== World championship game: California 6, Curaçao 5 ===
August 27 3:00 pm EDT Howard J. Lamade Stadium
Team	1	2	3	4	5	6	R	H	E
Curaçao	0	0	1	0	4	0	5	6	0
California ◄	2	0	2	1	0	1	6	7	0
WP: Brody Brooks (1–0) LP: Jay-Dlynn Wiel (3–1); Home runs: CUR: Nasir El-Ossaïs (2); CA: Louis Lappe (5); Notes: California wins the Little League World Series. Boxscore
