= Howard J. Lamade Stadium =

Baseball stadium in Williamsport, Pennsylvania

Coordinates: 41.23°N 76.98°W

- Lamade Stadium
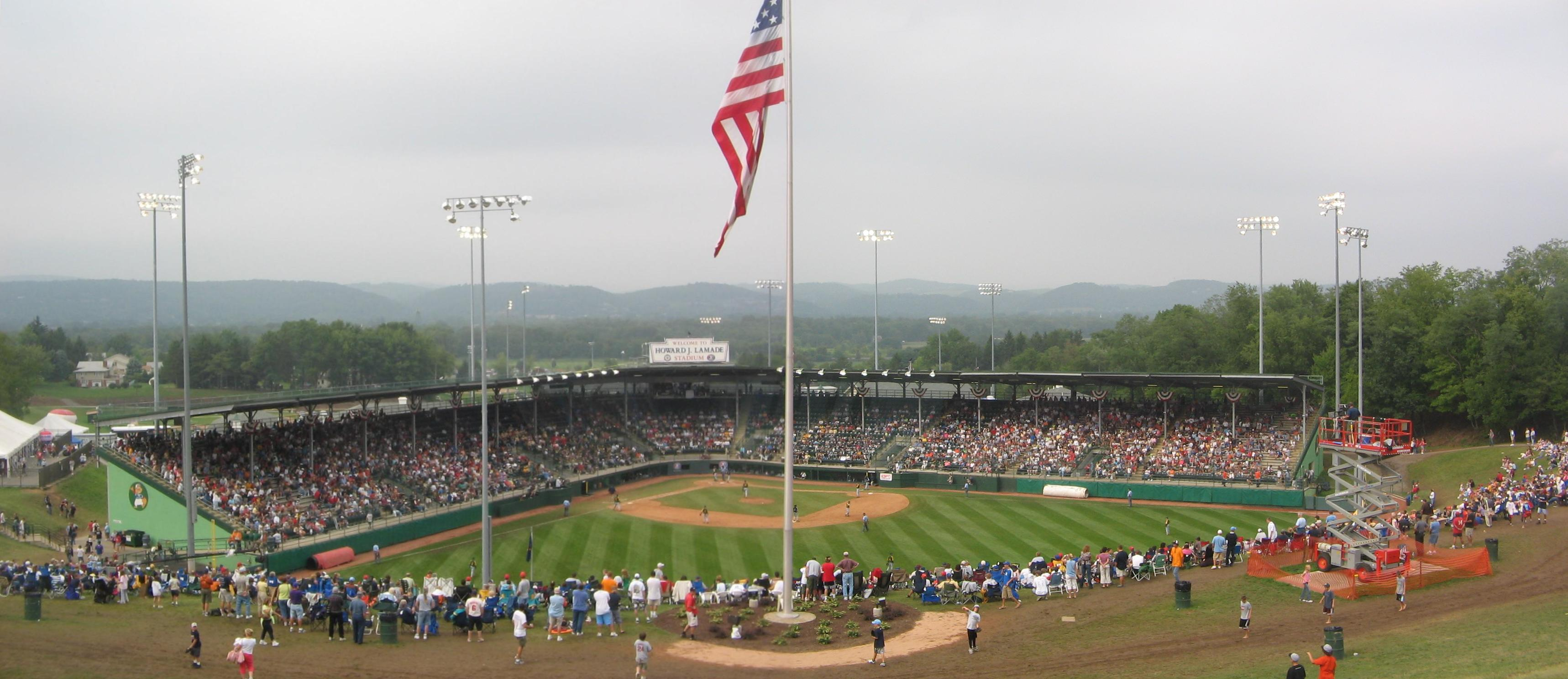
- Interactive map of Howard J. Lamade Stadium
- Former names: Howard J. Lamade Memorial Field
- Location: South Williamsport, Pennsylvania
- Owner: Little League Baseball
- Capacity: 10,000 (40,000 including berm seating)
- Surface: Kentucky Bluegrass
- Scoreboard: Daktronics BA-2026
- Field size: Any area: 225 ft (68.6 m)

Construction
- Opened: 1959, 67 years ago
- Renovated: 1968 (concrete); 1992 (lights); 2006 (dimensions)
- Expanded: 1971

Tenant
- Little League Baseball (1959-present)

Howard J. Lamade Stadium (pronounced "LAM-a-dee") is a baseball stadium in South Williamsport, Pennsylvania. Each year, along with Little League Volunteer Stadium, it hosts the Little League World Series. The playing field is two-thirds the size of a professional baseball field, with 60-foot (18.3 m) basepaths, a 46-foot (14 m) mound, and after modification in 2006, outfield fences at 225 ft (68.6 m), forming one-fourth of a true circle. Much of the capacity of the stadium is bench seating, while large berms surrounding the stadium provide additional seating allowing over 40,000 spectators.

== History ==
Originally called Howard J. Lamade Memorial Field, the ballpark opened for the 1959 tournament. Howard J. Lamade was the son of Grit newspaper founder Dietrick Lamade. The younger Lamade was a vice president at Grit Publishing, and served on the board of directors for Little League Baseball in the 1950s. A donation from Grit Publishing was used to purchase land where the stadium is located. The ballpark received its current name in 1968, when the original wood and steel stands were replaced with a concrete stadium.

=== Renovations ===
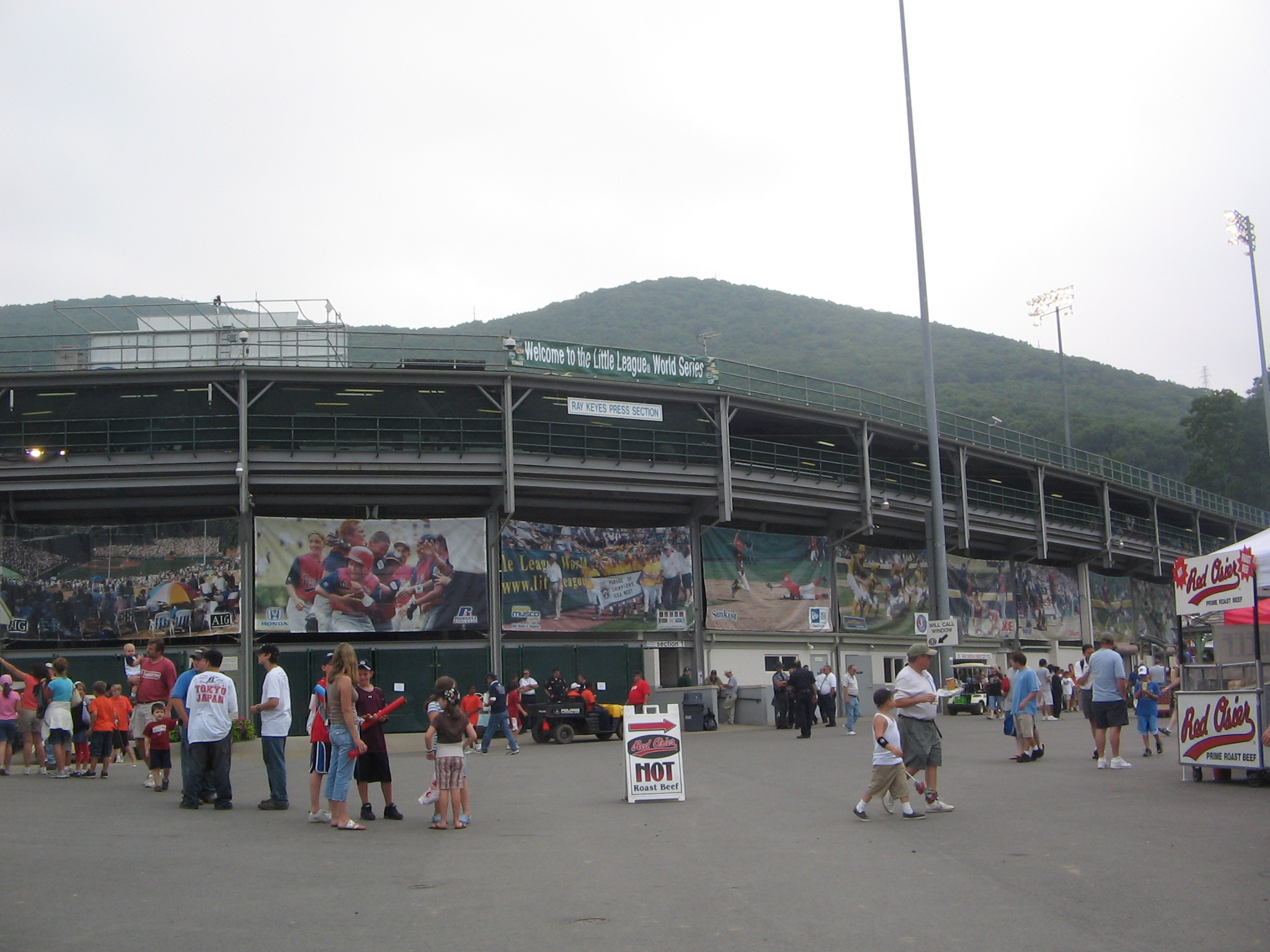
The exterior of Lamade Stadium in 2007

Lights were added in 1992 to facilitate night game play in conjunction with expansion of the series to round robin play.

In 2006, the fences were moved back 20 ft (6.1 m) to 225 ft (68.6 m) to all fields. This was done because home runs were becoming too common. Other renovations included the extension of the stadium roofs to the end of the grandstands, and some bleachers replaced with individual seats with backs, increasing seating of that type from approximately 600 to 1500.

On August 19, 2011, Lamade Stadium set an attendance record for the game between La Grange, Kentucky, and Clinton County, Pennsylvania, with 41,848 people in the stands and on the hill. It was later broken on August 29, 2015, when Lewisberry, Pennsylvania, defeated Pearland, Texas, with 45,716 in attendance.
