= South Williamsport, Pennsylvania =

Borough in Pennsylvania, US

- Borough
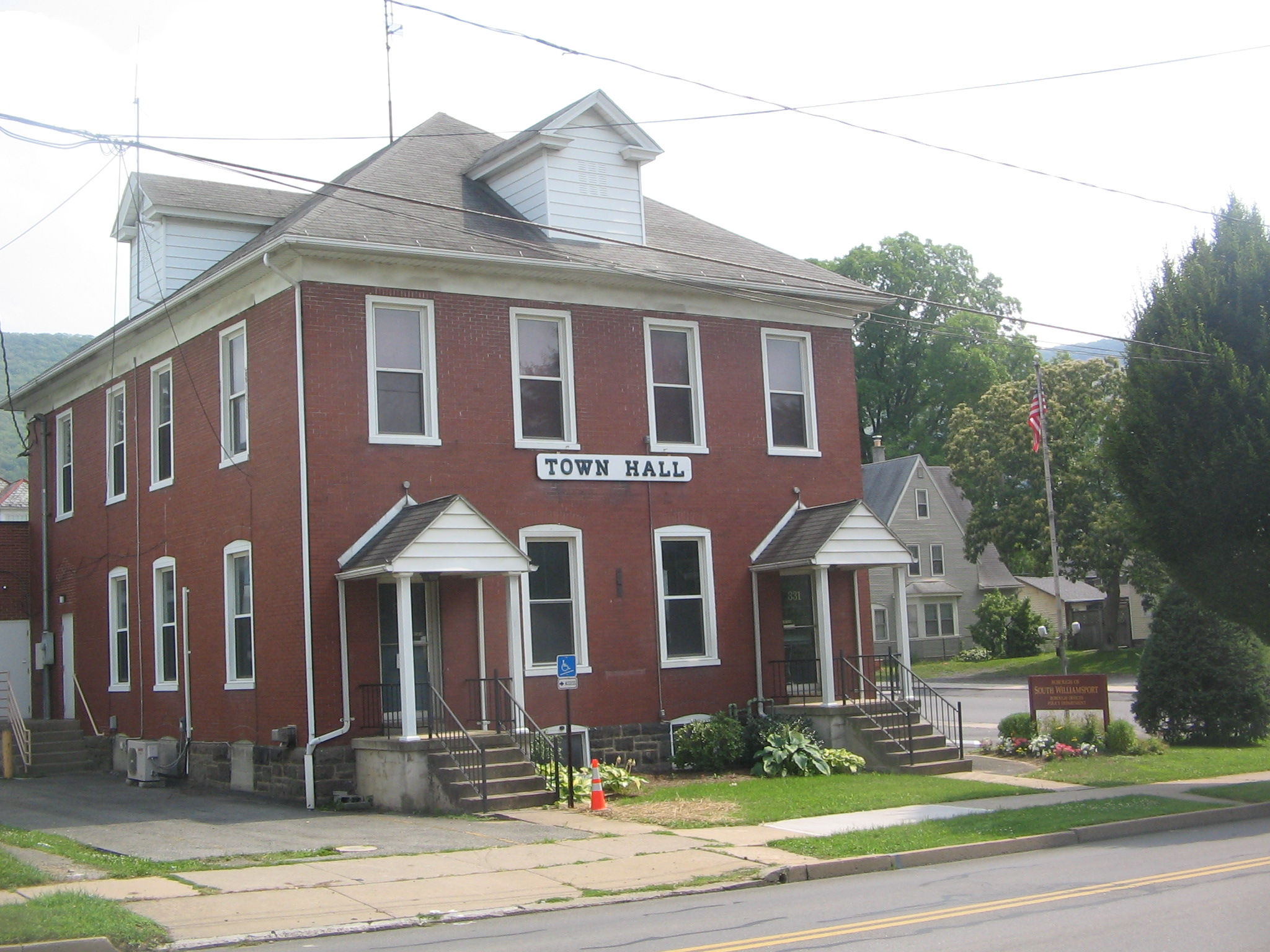
- Borough hall

- Location of South Williamsport in Lycoming County, Pennsylvania.

- Map of Pennsylvania highlighting Lycoming County
- Coordinates: 41°13′45″N 77°0′2″W
- Country: United States
- State: Pennsylvania
- County: Lycoming
- Settled: 1790
- Incorporated: 1886

Government
  - Mayor: Marlin R. Angelo

Area
  - Total: 2.16 sq mi (5.60 km^{2})
  - Land: 1.90 sq mi (4.92 km^{2})
  - Water: 0.26 sq mi (0.68 km^{2})
- Elevation: 522 ft (159 m)

Population (2020)
  - Total: 6,261
  - Density: 3,300/sq mi (1,273/km^{2})
- Time zone: UTC-5 (Eastern (EST))
  - Summer (DST): UTC-4 (EDT)
- ZIP code: 17702
- Area code: 570
- FIPS code: 42-72648
- GNIS feature ID: 1213653
- Website: southwilliamsport.net

South Williamsport is a borough in Lycoming County, Pennsylvania, United States. It is famous for hosting the Little League World Series. The population was 6,259 at the 2020 census. It is part of the Williamsport, Pennsylvania Metropolitan Statistical Area.

== History ==
South Williamsport celebrated the centennial of its incorporation as a borough in 1986. On November 29, 1886, the Lycoming County court incorporated the villages of Rocktown, Billman, and vicinities as the borough of South Williamsport. The land had previously been part of Armstrong Township.

The first recorded inhabitants of the Susquehanna River valley were the Iroquoian speaking Susquehannocks. Their name meant "people of the muddy river" in Algonquian. Decimated by diseases and warfare, they had died out, moved away, or been assimilated into other tribes by the early 18th century. The lands of the West Branch Susquehanna River valley were then chiefly occupied by the Munsee clan or phratry of the Lenape, and were under the nominal control of the Five (later Six) Nations of the Iroquois.

The British purchased land from the Iroquois in the Treaty of Fort Stanwix of 1768, opening what is now Lycoming County to settlement. After the American Revolutionary War, Lycoming County was formed from Northumberland County, on April 13, 1795. The county's area was originally over 12,000 square miles (31,000 km^{2}) and several other counties were subsequently formed from it.

Williamsport, across the river from South Williamsport, was also founded in 1795 and chosen as the county seat. The first settler in what is now South Williamsport is believed to have been Aaron Hagerman, a transplanted Hollander, who is thought to have arrived shortly after the end of the American Revolutionary War. Hagermans Run, which flows through the borough, bears his name.

One of the predecessor communities was "Rocktown". And another was Bootstown. One of the first businesses was a tavern established near the mouth of Hagermans Run by Michael McDonough. Another early entrepreneur, Jacob Weiss, gave the village a push toward borough status by purchasing a tract of 40 acres and laying out town lots. Weiss also established a brickyard near McDonough’s tavern and for many years operated an oil mill and a gristmill.

From those early times to the present, South Williamsport’s fortunes have been linked to those of Williamsport. Sawmills and furniture factories were among the most prosperous industries in both communities. Planing mills and woodworking factories of all types reached a peak of activity during the logging boom of the post-Civil War years of the last century. The industry gradually declined in the 1890s when the surrounding hills were finally stripped of saleable lumber and the logging crews moved west.

Today, manufacturing diversity is the rule. The area is reforested with second-growth timber, providing scenic beauty as well as woodland recreational opportunities. In South Williamsport, prime employers include: Little League Baseball, Inc., Keystone Friction Hinge, South Williamsport Area School District and the New Lycoming Bakery. Although Bald Eagle Mountain to the south and the river on the north have restricted development in South Williamsport, growth has been steady.

In 1890, there were 2,900 residents. About 600 young scholars attended 10 borough schools. The 2000 census counted 6,412 residents and today, 1,534 students are enrolled in three South Williamsport Area Schools Central Elementary (K-4) is on West Mountain Ave. Rommelt Elementary (5-6) is on West Central Ave. South Williamsport Area Jr./Sr. High School, Home of the Mountaineers, is on Percy Street. The School District is also home to one of the oldest high school football stadiums in the state, Rodney K. Morgans Stadium, which is built into the hillside directly between Central and Rommelt Elementary Schools.

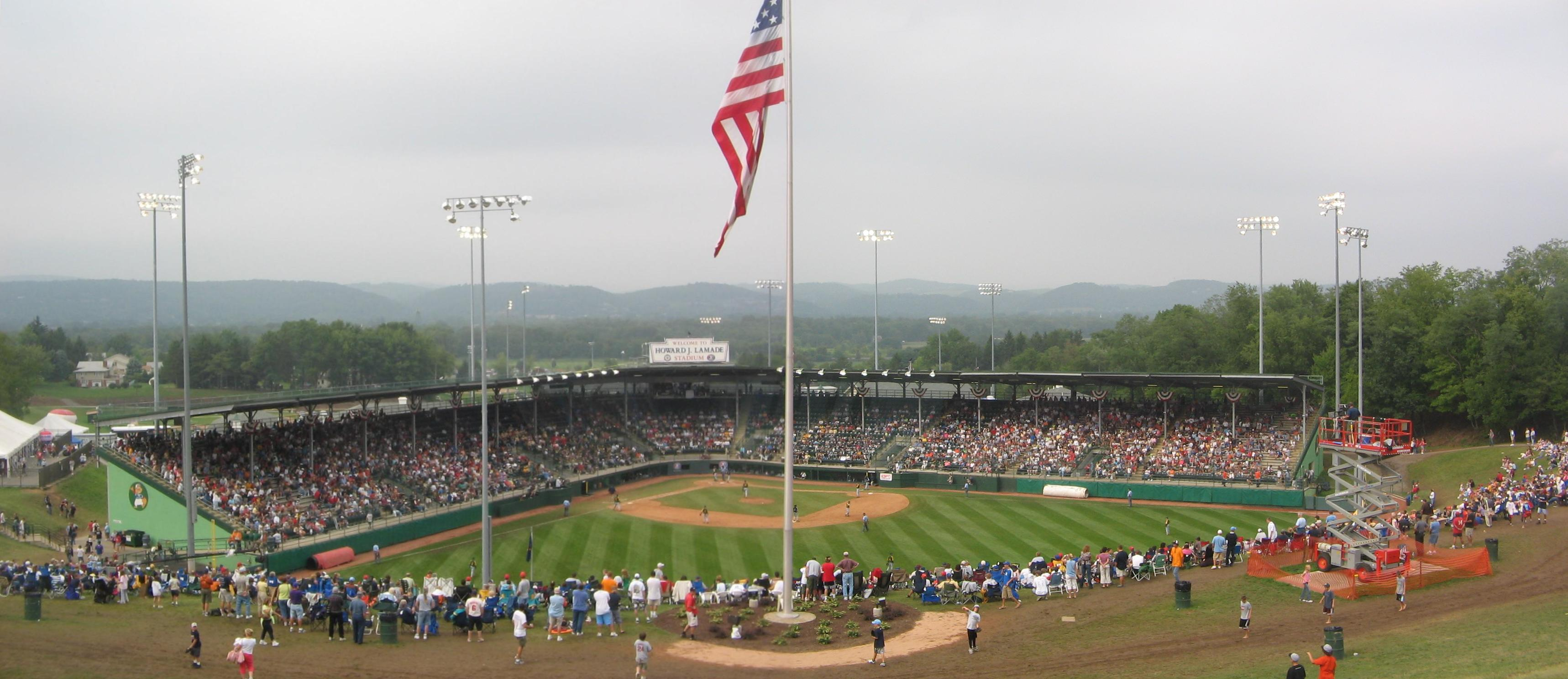
A Little League World Series game in Howard J. Lamade Stadium in South Williamsport.

== Geography ==
South Williamsport is located at 41°13′45″N 77°0′2″W (41.229179, -77.000464), and is surrounded by the West Branch Susquehanna River to the north (with Williamsport north of the river), Armstrong Township to the east and south, and Duboistown to the west. As the crow flies, Lycoming County is approximately 130 miles (209 km) northwest of Philadelphia and 165 miles (266 km) east-northeast of Pittsburgh.

According to the United States Census Bureau, the borough has a total area of 2.1 square miles (5.5 km^{2}), of which 1.9 square miles (4.9 km^{2}) is land and 0.2 square mile (0.6 km^{2}) (11.37%) is water.

The South Williamsport flood-control levees are in the Baltimore District of the U.S. Army Corps of Engineers and have been cited as "levees of maintenance concern". Failure to repair them will result in loss of federal assistance in a flood.

== Demographics ==
Historical population
Census	Pop.	Note	%±
1890	2,900		—
1900	3,328		14.8%
1910	3,734		12.2%
1920	4,341		16.3%
1930	6,058		39.6%
1940	6,033		−0.4%
1950	6,364		5.5%
1960	6,972		9.6%
1970	7,153		2.6%
1980	6,581		−8.0%
1990	6,496		−1.3%
2000	6,412		−1.3%
2010	6,379		−0.5%
2020	6,261		−1.8%
2021 (est.)	6,224	▼	−0.6%
U.S. Decennial Census

As of the census of 2000, there were 6,412 people, 2,735 households, and 1,775 families residing in the borough. The population density was 3,414.0 inhabitants per square mile (1,318.2/km^{2}). There were 2,884 housing units at an average density of 1,535.5 per square mile (592.9/km^{2}). The racial makeup of the borough was 98.74% White, 0.44% African American, 0.12% Native American, 0.20% Asian, 0.03% from other races, and 0.47% from two or more races. Hispanic or Latino of any race were 0.56% of the population.

There were 2,735 households, out of which 30.1% had children under the age of 18 living with them, 50.5% were married couples living together, 10.4% had a female householder with no husband present, and 35.1% were non-families. 29.8% of all households were made up of individuals, and 13.6% had someone living alone who was 65 years of age or older. The average household size was 2.33 and the average family size was 2.88.

In the borough the population was spread out, with 23.5% under the age of 18, 8.0% from 18 to 24, 27.8% from 25 to 44, 22.1% from 45 to 64, and 18.6% who were 65 years of age or older. The median age was 39 years. For every 100 females, there were 95.1 males. For every 100 females age 18 and over, there were 92.0 males.

The median income for a household in the borough was $34,018, and the median income for a family was $40,673. Males had a median income of $31,892 versus $22,088 for females. The per capita income for the borough was $18,658. About 8.1% of families and 10.3% of the population were below the poverty line, including 17.2% of those under age 18 and 6.6% of those age 65 or over.

Major ancestry groups reported by South Williamsport residents include: German - 37%, Irish - 12%, Italian - 10%, English - 8%, Pennsylvania Dutch - 5% Polish - 4%, French (except Basque) - 3%, Welsh - 1%, Scots-Irish - 1%, Scottish - 1%, Swedish - 1%, Swiss - 1%

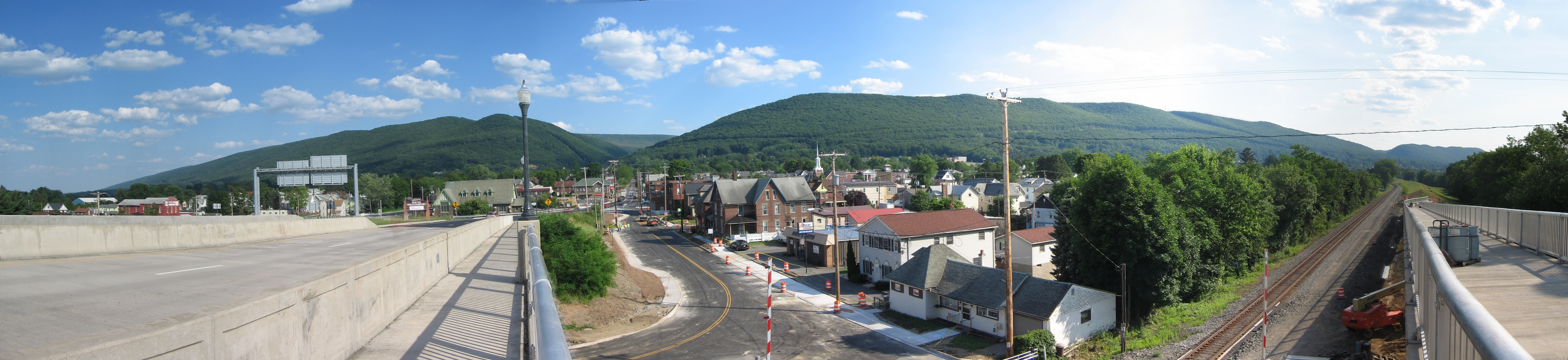
A panoramic view of South Williamsport from the Carl E. Stotz Memorial Little League Bridge with Bald Eagle Mountain in the background

== See also ==
- History of Lycoming County, Pennsylvania
