= List of people from Chandler, Arizona =

This is a list of people who were born in, or have lived in, Chandler, Arizona.

== Athletics ==
- Adam Archuleta – professional football player, Chicago Bears
- Ryan Bader – mixed martial artist, UFC's Light Heavyweight division
- Clay Bellinger – former professional baseball player 1999-2002 (Yankees & Angels)
- Cody Bellinger – professional baseball player 2017–present (Dodgers, Cubs, Yankees)
- Matt Bersano – soccer player
- Hunter Bishop (born 1998) – baseball player
- Melissa Buhl – downhill and mountain-cross cycling champion
- Roch Cholowsky (born 2005) – first overall pick of the 2026 Major League Baseball draft, selected by the Chicago White Sox
- T.J. Clark – NASCAR driver
- Leonard Davis – professional football player, Dallas Cowboys
- Chris DeGeare – professional football player
- Louie Espinoza – Arizona's first world champion boxer
- Andre Ethier – professional baseball player, Los Angeles Dodgers
- Nelson Figueroa – professional baseball player
- Ryan Fitzpatrick – Tampa Bay Buccaneers quarterback
- Zora Folley – heavyweight boxer; Folley Street is named for him
- Channing Frye – NBA basketball player, Cleveland Cavaliers
- Barry Gardner – professional football player
- Robbie Gould – professional football player, San Francisco 49ers
- Brett Hundley – professional football player, Green Bay Packers
- Mike Leach – professional football player, Arizona Cardinals
- Rodrigo Lopez – professional baseball player, Chicago Cubs
- Tank Johnson – professional football player
- Cameron Jordan – professional football player, New Orleans Saints
- Dion Jordan – professional football player, Seattle Seahawks
- Mike Kruczek – professional football player
- Andy Lane – professional baseball player and coach, Chicago Cubs
- Matt Leinart – professional football player
- Becca Longo – high school football kicker, first woman to receive NCAA football scholarship at Division II or better
- Jeff Malone – professional basketball player
- Donovan McNabb – professional football quarterback
- Dustin Pedroia – professional baseball player
- Paul Perkins – professional football player, New York Giants
- Keith Poole – professional football player
- AQ Shipley – professional football player, Arizona Cardinals
- Tyler Shough — professional football player, New Orleans Saints
- Junior Spivey – professional baseball player
- Dernell Stenson – professional baseball player
- Terrell Suggs – professional football player, Baltimore Ravens
- Lindsay Taylor – WNBA player, Seattle Storm
- Brian Urlacher – professional football player, Chicago Bears
- Greg Vanney – MLS player, D.C. United
- Markus Wheaton – professional football player, Pittsburgh Steelers
- Ken Whisenhunt – professional football player and coach

== Literature ==
- Bill Konigsberg – author
- Dary Matera – author, columnist
- Alberto Ríos – poet, writer, academic

== Movies/television/media ==
- Alexa Havins – actress, All My Children
- Ice-T – actor and rapper, part-time resident
- Shawn Michaels – professional wrestler, WWE
- TheOdd1sOut (James Rallison) – YouTuber, artist, and animator
- Liz Renay – actress, gangster's moll

== Music/arts ==
- Erik Foss – artist and curator
- Antony Hämäläinen – lead singer, Meridian Dawn and former vocalist of Nightrage
- Waylon Jennings – singer, Country Music Hall of Fame
- Tom Linton – guitarist of Jimmy Eat World
- Kylee Saunders – Japanese-American pop star

== Politics ==
- In Tam – Cambodian politician

== Miscellaneous ==
- Eddie Basha, Jr. – businessman, CEO of Bashas'
- Ben Browning – entrepreneur and Survivor contestant
- Alexander J. Chandler – veterinarian, rancher, and founder of Chandler
- Tom Liddy – nationally syndicated conservative talk radio host, attorney
- Brenna Sakas – Miss Arizona USA 2006
