= Georgia Mae Harp =

Georgia Mae Harp

Georgia Mae Harp (1921–2014), often known professionally by the stage name of just Georgia Mae, was a New England Country & Western musician and singer of the mid-20th century.

== Early life ==
Georgia Mae Kingsbury was born on April 2, 1921, in Walpole, Massachusetts, the daughter of Edna and William Kingsbury, and was graduated from Walpole High School. Her brother and father were barbershop quartet singers, and she and a cousin were inspired by the music of Patsy Montana to become yodeling cowgirls.

== Career ==
Georgia Mae began entertaining while in junior high school. While still a teen, she got a regular weekly slot on WROL (AM) (then WBSO), and also played (with the Blue Ridge Mountaineers) on WEEI (AM) (then WHDH). She moved to the 50,000-watt station WBZ (AM), where she had a 6:30 am daily show, the "New England Farm Hour" followed by "Georgia Mae and her Buckaroos".

Later she had a weekly Saturday television show on WBZ-TV and was DJ for "Korn's a-Krackin" on WRKO (AM) (then WLAW). She also toured throughout New England and parts of Canada, playing her iconic customized white Vega guitar, demonstrating her virtuoso triple yodel, and sporting her elaborate outfits made by "Rodeo Ben" Lichtenstein. Although she played with backing musicians on radio and recordings, her live appearances were solo shows. During World War II, Georgia Mae entertained at veteran's hospitals and at war bond drives.

== Personal life ==
Georgia Mae was married to Oscar Harp for 47 years; they had no children. She was a member and officer of the Daughters of the American Revolution, the Women Descendants of the Ancient and Honorable Artillery Company, and other organizations concerned with American history and genealogy. Georgia Mae Harp died on July 25, 2014, in South Carver, Massachusetts.

== Discography ==
- Georgia Mae and the Buckaroos, "She Taught Me How To Yodel" b/w "Rockinghorse Cowboy" (10-inch shellac 78 rpm single, 1949, Back Bay Records B-105)
