= Cody Bellinger =

American baseball player (born 1995)

- Bellinger with the New York Yankees in 2026

New York Yankees – No. 35
- Outfielder / First baseman
- Born: July 13, 1995 (age 31); Scottsdale, Arizona, U.S.
- Bats: Left Throws: Left

MLB debut
- April 25, 2017, for the Los Angeles Dodgers

MLB statistics (through 2026 season)
- Batting average: .261
- Home runs: 242
- Runs batted in: 768
- Stats at Baseball Reference

Teams
- Los Angeles Dodgers (2017–2022); Chicago Cubs (2023–2024); New York Yankees (2025–present)

Career highlights and awards
- 3× All-Star (2017, 2019, 2026); World Series champion (2020); NL MVP (2019); All-MLB First Team (2019); NL Rookie of the Year (2017); NLCS MVP (2018); 2× Gold Glove Award (2019, 2026); 2× Silver Slugger Award (2019, 2023); NL Comeback Player of the Year (2023)

Cody James Bellinger (born July 13, 1995) is an American professional baseball outfielder and first baseman for the New York Yankees of Major League Baseball (MLB). He has previously played in MLB for the Los Angeles Dodgers and Chicago Cubs. He was selected by the Dodgers in the fourth round of the 2013 MLB draft and debuted with them in 2017.

The son of MLB player Clay Bellinger, Bellinger helped his team reach the 2007 Little League World Series at the age of 11. He played high school baseball for Hamilton High School in Chandler, Arizona. Bellinger spent two years in the Rookie Leagues before joining the Rancho Cucamonga Quakes in 2015, where he was a mid- and postseason all-star, and helped the team to a California League championship title. A hip injury delayed his rise through the Dodgers' farm system in 2016, but he was called up to the major leagues in April 2017 to bolster a struggling outfield.

Bellinger, setting a number of Dodgers single-season home run records, participated in both the 2017 MLB All-Star Game and in the Home Run Derby. He was named the National League (NL) Rookie of the Year after the season. The following year, he was named the MVP of the 2018 National League Championship Series following an extra innings walk-off single that helped take the Dodgers to the 2018 World Series. He received the NL MVP, Silver Slugger, and Gold Glove Awards in 2019, as well as his second All-Star selection. Bellinger won his first World Series title with the Dodgers in 2020 over the Tampa Bay Rays. However, a number of injuries to his shoulder, calf, and rib cage caused 2021 to be a career-worst year for Bellinger in home runs and batting average. After another down year in 2022, Bellinger was non-tendered by the Dodgers and eventually signed with the Cubs following the offseason. He won NL Comeback Player of the Year in his first season with Chicago before being traded to the Yankees following his second season with the Cubs in 2024. Bellinger was named to his third All-Star Game in 2026 where he was named All-Star Game MVP.

== Early life ==
Cody James Bellinger was born on July 13, 1995, in Scottsdale, Arizona, to Clay and Jennifer Bellinger. His mother works for Sotheby's International Realty, while his father played for the New York Yankees and Anaheim Angels of Major League Baseball (MLB) from 1999 to 2002, winning two World Series in that span. Clay Bellinger also coached the Chandler, Arizona National Little League team, for whom his son played when they went to the 2007 Little League World Series (LLWS). Cody was only 11 years old at the time, one year younger than most of his LLWS teammates, but he helped to clinch a berth in the series with a four-runs batted in (RBI) performance in the Little League West Regional. Chandler advanced to the LLWS in Williamsport, Pennsylvania, but was eliminated in the semifinals by teams from Lubbock, Texas and Warner Robins, Georgia.

A few years later, Bellinger became a standout baseball player for Hamilton High School in Chandler. He was voted team MVP as both a junior and as a senior, and hit .429 in his senior season. Although scouts from the Yankees invited Bellinger to a pre-draft practice, most baseball teams were uninterested in using a high draft pick on Bellinger, who stood 6 feet 4 inches (1.93 m) but weighed only 170 pounds (77 kg) in his final year of high school, and who hit only one home run that season.

== Professional career ==
=== Minor leagues (2013–17) ===
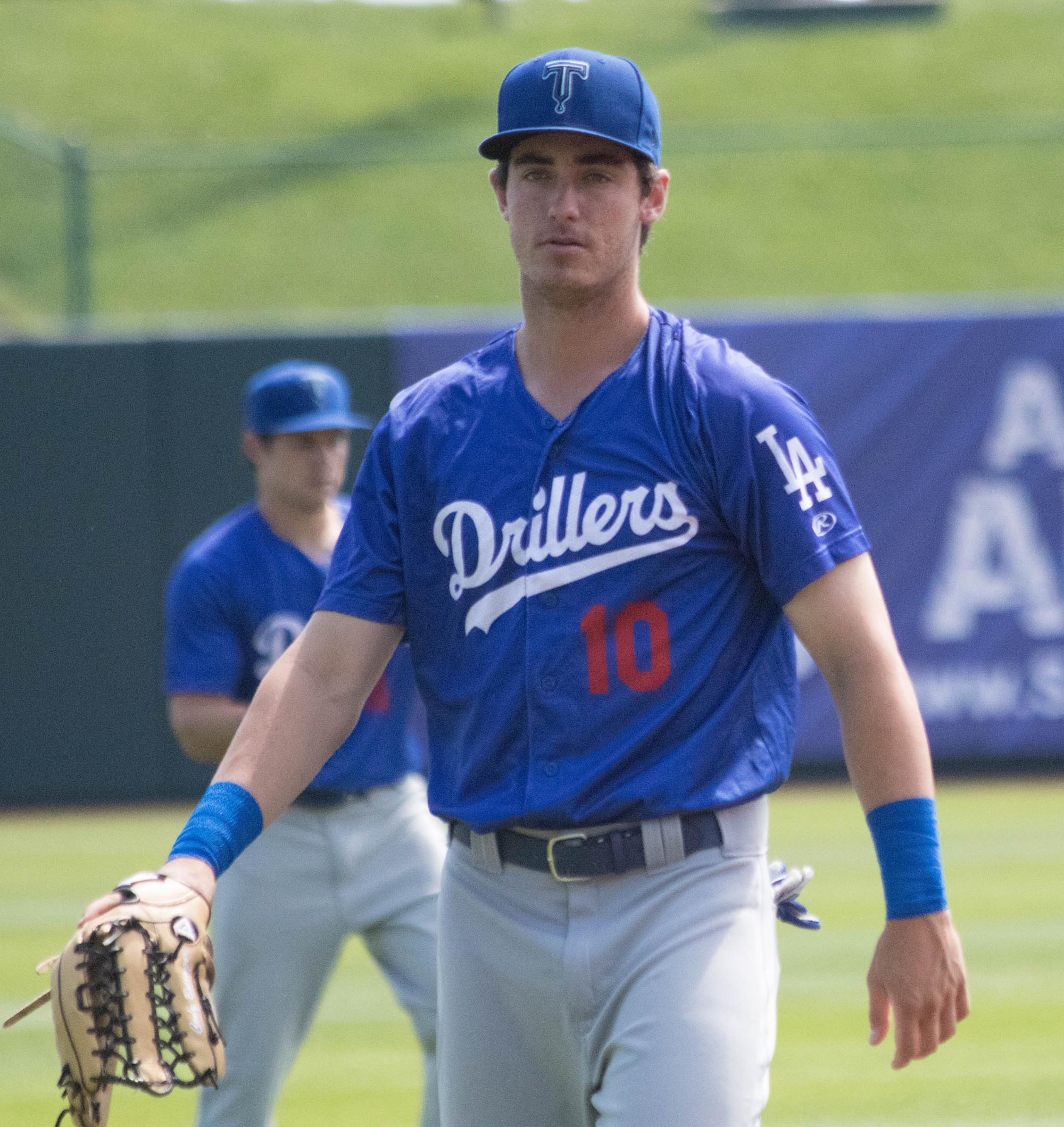
Bellinger with the Tulsa Drillers in 2016

The Los Angeles Dodgers selected Bellinger in the fourth round, 124th overall, of the 2013 MLB draft. At the time, he had committed to play college baseball for the Oregon Ducks. Bellinger chose to forego his commitment to Oregon to sign with the Dodgers for a signing bonus of $700,000, approximately $300,000 more than what was recommended for a fourth-round draft pick. He spent the season with the Rookie League AZL Dodgers, batting .210 in 162 at-bats, with one home run, 30 RBIs, and 25 runs scored. He showed some difficulties with plate discipline, striking out 46 times in 47 games, but showed potential by drawing 31 walks and recording 16 extra-base hits. He continued in Rookie ball the following season with the Ogden Raptors, batting .328 with 34 RBIs in 46 Pioneer League games.

Assigned to the Class A-Advanced Rancho Cucamonga Quakes, the 2015 season was Bellinger's first full year in the minor leagues. His prospect performance started to gain attention when, by June 11, he was fifth in the California League with 12 home runs, and was at least three years younger than every other top-five hitter. Although his .557 slugging percentage was comparatively low, this was due in part to the shape of the Rancho Cucamonga Epicenter, which limited home runs. After making an appearance at the midseason California League All-Star Game, Bellinger was also the selected designated hitter for the California League postseason All-Star team. Following the regular minor league season, he helped the Quakes to a Cal League championship title, registering three extra-base hits, including the game-winning home run, to complete their sweep of the San Jose Giants. For his performance, Bellinger was named the California League Championship Series MVP. He batted .264 for the Quakes, recording 30 home runs, 103 RBIs, and 97 runs in 478 at bats.

After a strong spring training performance in which he batted .393 in 18 games, Bellinger opened the 2016 season with the Double-A Tulsa Drillers of the Texas League. He missed the first part of the Double-A season with a strained hip, and upon returning from the disabled list in May, Bellinger struggled to make contact, batting .150 through his first 50 at-bats. His drought snapped on May 16, with a walk-off grand slam against the Arkansas Travelers. He spent the bulk of the season in Tulsa, batting .263 with 23 home runs and 65 RBIs in 114 games, but was promoted to the Triple-A Oklahoma City Dodgers on September 3, in advance of the Pacific Coast League playoffs. He played in only three games for Oklahoma City that season, recording three home runs and six RBIs in the process. Having missed a month of the season with his injured hip, Bellinger played for the Glendale Desert Dogs of the Arizona Fall League, earning All-Fall League team honors. In 20 games with Glendale, Bellinger hit .314 with three home runs, eight doubles, and 17 RBIs, and he was named a member of the AFL Top Prospects Team.

During the 2016–17 MLB offseason, Bellinger and fellow Dodgers prospect Jose De Leon received an invitation to the MLB/MLBPA Rookie Career Development Program in Leesburg, Virginia, where top prospects from each club spend four days learning about life in the major leagues. He began the 2017 season with Oklahoma City, batting .343 with five home runs and 15 RBIs in the first 18 games of the year before receiving a call-up to Los Angeles.

=== Los Angeles Dodgers (2017–22) ===
==== 2017: NL Rookie of the Year ====
Faced with a struggling and injured outfield, the Dodgers called Bellinger up on April 25, 2017, giving him the start in left field and eighth position in the batting order for that night's game against the San Francisco Giants. Bellinger scored his first major league hit that night, an infield ground ball towards third base. He was also the third Dodger since 1913 to be intentionally walked in his MLB debut, following Chico Fernández in 1956 and Dick Nen in 1963. Four days later, Bellinger hit the first and second home runs of his major league career in a game against the Philadelphia Phillies, first in the seventh inning against Zach Eflin and again as the second of three consecutive home runs against closer Héctor Neris. His first career grand slam came the following week on May 6, helping take the Dodgers to a 10–2 victory over the San Diego Padres and Bellinger to five home runs and 14 RBIs in his first 11 major league games. With a total of nine home runs in May, Bellinger tied Joc Pederson and James Loney for the most home runs by a Dodgers rookie in one month of the season, and his total of 11 home runs in 32 games made him the fastest Dodgers rookie in history to reach that mark.

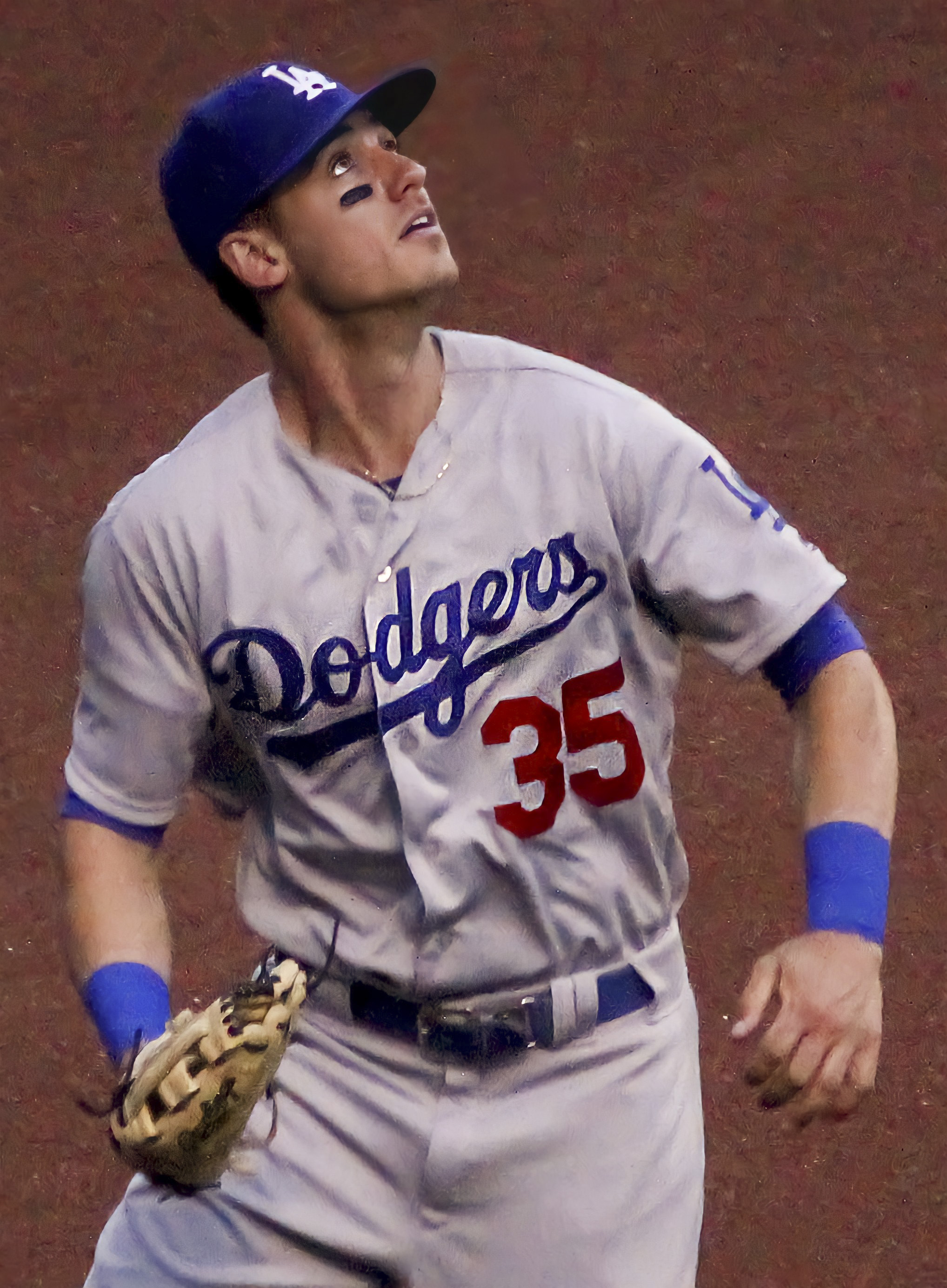
Bellinger with the Dodgers in 2017

A series of multi-home run games in June helped Bellinger set several team and MLB records. On June 13, Bellinger became the fastest player in MLB history to record four multi-home run games, doing so in 45 contests; the previous record was set by Bob Horner with 63 games in 1978. He was also the first Dodger to have consecutive multi-home run games since Adrián Beltré in 2004, and was the third Dodgers rookie to record at least four multi-home run games in one season. In the first inning of an outing against the New York Mets on June 19, his 51st career MLB game, Bellinger tied Gary Sánchez and Wally Berger as the fastest players to reach 20 home runs. In the next inning, he recorded an additional solo shot against Zack Wheeler to become the fastest player to 21 home runs. The following day, a first-inning hit off of Robert Gsellman helped Bellinger to become the first rookie in MLB history to record 10 home runs in a span of 10 games. With his sixth two-home run game of the season on June 25, Bellinger passed Mike Piazza's team rookie record for most multi-home run games in one season, and led the NL with 24 total home runs. He capped off the first half of the season with his first appearances in both the Major League Baseball All-Star Game and in the Home Run Derby. At the latter, Bellinger hit 27 home runs across two rounds, defeating Charlie Blackmon before falling to Aaron Judge of the Yankees in the semifinals.

While facing the Miami Marlins on July 15, Bellinger became the first Dodgers rookie in history to hit for the cycle, going 4-for-5 with a home run, three RBIs, and two runs. With his 35th home run of the year on September 2, Bellinger tied Mike Piazza's Dodgers rookie record; he broke Piazza's record the following day with a ninth-inning shot off of Padres closer Brad Hand. On September 22, Bellinger's 39th career home run both helped the Dodgers clinch the NL West title over the San Francisco Giants and broke Wally Berger and Frank Robinson's record for the most National League (NL) home runs made by a rookie. Bellinger finished his rookie MLB season hitting .267 with 39 home runs, 97 RBIs, and 87 runs scored in 480 at bats and 132 games.

Bellinger's first MLB postseason began with the 2017 National League Division Series (NLDS) against the Arizona Diamondbacks, where his fifth-inning solo home run in Game 3 made him the youngest Dodger to hit a postseason home run in franchise history. His next postseason home run came against Jake Arrieta of the Chicago Cubs in Game 4 of the 2017 National League Championship Series (NLCS); in doing so, he became the youngest player to homer in a Championship Series game since the 20-year-old Miguel Cabrera did so in Game 7 of the 2003 NLCS. Outside of home runs, however, Bellinger did not generate many hits: with three strikeouts in Game 7 of the 2017 World Series, Bellinger set the MLB record with 29 strikeouts in a single postseason run. Despite the Dodgers falling to the Houston Astros in the World Series, Bellinger was the unanimous winner of the NL Rookie of the Year Award.

==== 2018: NLCS MVP ====
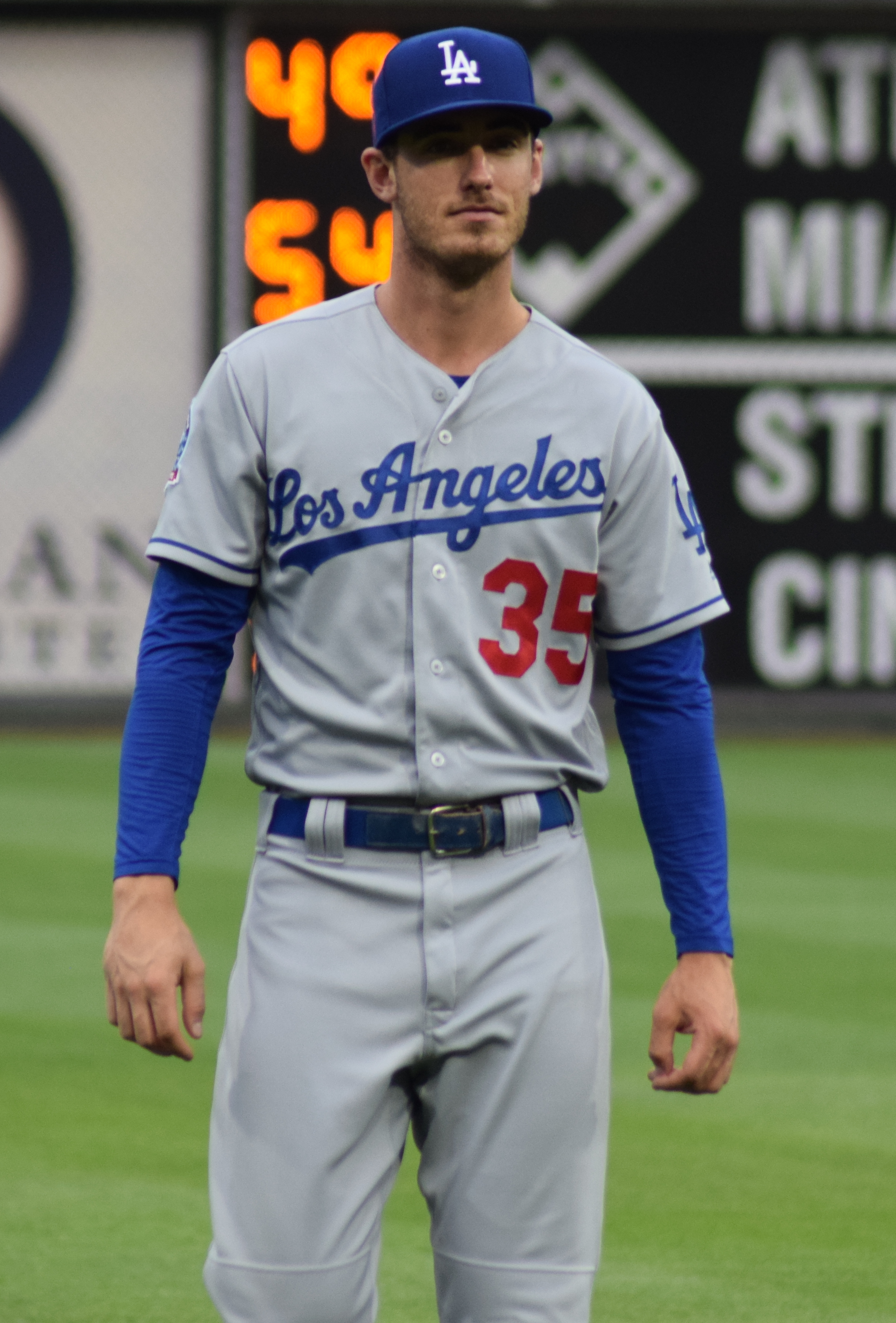
Bellinger with the Dodgers in 2018

As he entered the 2018 MLB season, Bellinger was unfazed by the concept of a sophomore slump, in which an athlete's performance falters during their second professional season. He hit the first home run of the season, a two-run shot off of Josh Osich of the Giants to spur the Dodgers to a 9–0 victory and end Bellinger's opening 0-for-11 skid. That home run was also the 40th of Bellinger's career. He accomplished the feat in 136 games, making him the third-fastest MLB player to reach 40 career home runs. Bellinger was unable to sustain his rookie momentum through the start of June, however, when manager Dave Roberts benched him on June 3, there were questions that Bellinger would be optioned back to the minors. Bellinger, meanwhile, used the benching to make a small adjustment to his stance in the batter's box, and he proceeded to record six hits in his next 13 at-bats, including home runs in four consecutive games. He played in all 162 regular-season games that year, batting .260 with 25 home runs and 76 RBIs in 557 at bats.

Bellinger helped the Dodgers to capture the NL West title with the go-ahead two-run home run in a tiebreaker game against the Colorado Rockies on October 1. Once the Dodgers reached the 2018 postseason, however, he began to slump, not recording a hit in the four-game NLDS against the Atlanta Braves. Although he did not hit often during the NLCS against the Milwaukee Brewers, the hits that Bellinger did have were impactful: his 10th-inning jumping catch in Game 4 kept the Dodgers alive, while a 13th-inning single in led the Dodgers towards a walk-off win. After hitting the go-ahead home run in Game 7 that clinched the National League pennant for the Dodgers, Bellinger was named the NLCS MVP for the 2018 season. Despite receiving his NLCS honor, Bellinger started only two games in the 2018 World Series, with manager Dave Roberts preferring to platoon almost every position. He successfully reached base only once in the five-game series, on a single, and was later caught stealing. The Dodgers lost the World Series to the Boston Red Sox in five games, and Bellinger was benched in the elimination game, giving the right-handed Enrique Hernández the start against left-handed Boston pitcher David Price.

==== 2019: NL MVP ====
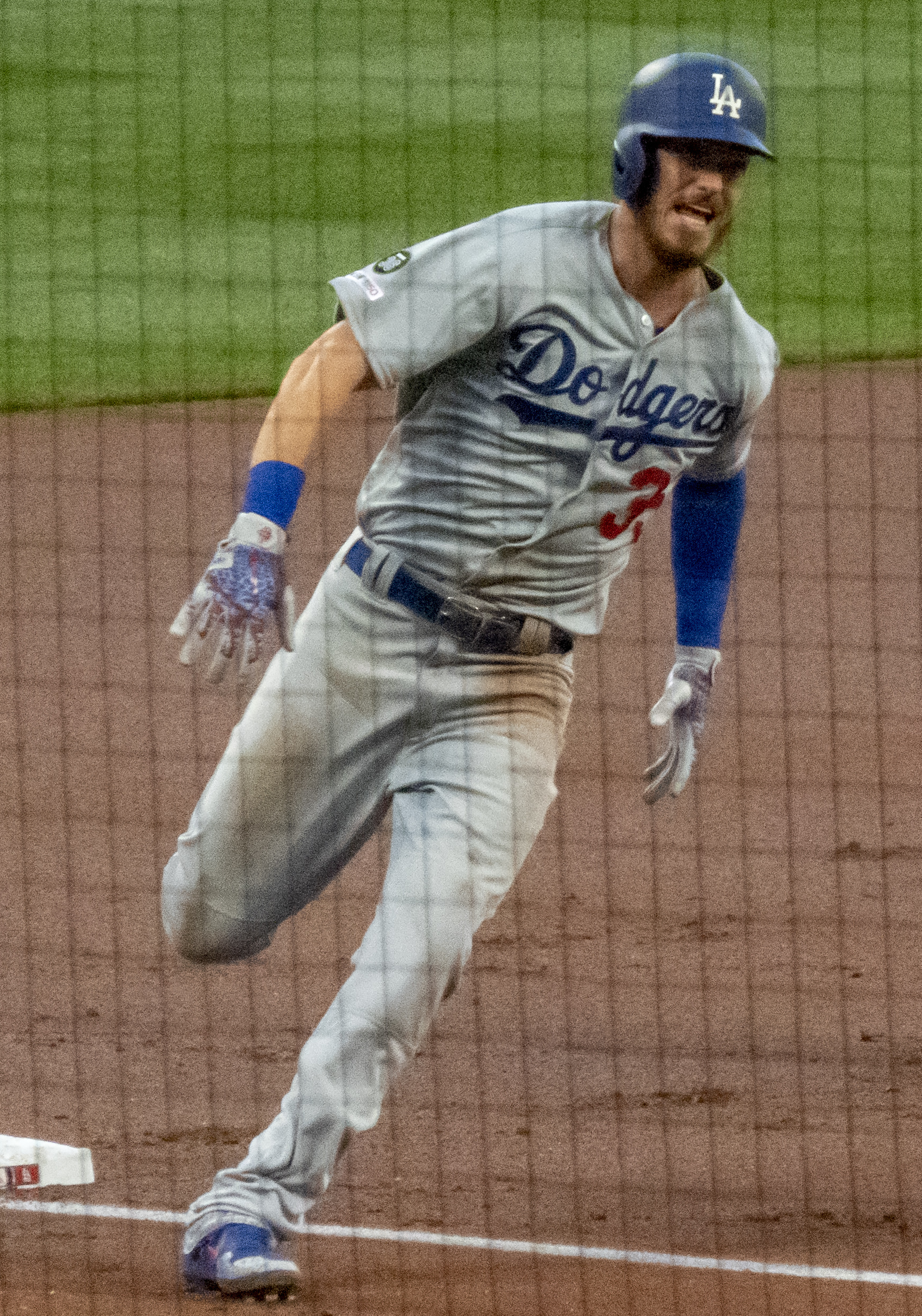
Bellinger with the Dodgers in 2019.

Bellinger started the 2019 season on a hot streak, leading MLB in runs, hits, batting average, and slugging percentage by the end of April. His 13th home run of the season came on April 27, breaking Matt Kemp's record for the most single-season home runs of any Dodger through the end of April. The home run also lifted Bellinger to 88 total bases by the end of April, three more than Chase Utley's 2008 record and the most of any batter in the live-ball era. His 97 total bases, 37 RBIs, and 47 hits before May 1 were all MLB records, while his 32 runs scored and 14 home runs tied existing records. Batting .431 in 132 plate appearances, Bellinger received his first Player of the Month honors for April 2019.

By the All-Star break, Bellinger and Christian Yelich of the Milwaukee Brewers were the frontrunners for the NL MVP Award. Bellinger led with 72 runs, 73 RBIs, a .334 average, and a .431 on-base percentage, while his 31 home runs, .687 slugging percentage, and 1.118 on-base plus slugging (OPS) were all slightly behind Yelich. Bellinger also led MLB with 6.7 Wins Above Replacement. Bellinger received both his second All-Star game nod and his first All-Star start in 2019, opening the game in the NL outfield with Yelich and with Ronald Acuña Jr. of the Atlanta Braves. He also received an invitation to that year's Home Run Derby, but turned it down in order to have a day off from baseball before the All-Star game.

During a particularly frustrating Freeway Series game on July 24, Bellinger received his first MLB game ejection after arguing with home plate umpire Dan Iassogna over balls and strikes. Bellinger justified his decision by saying, "I'm trying to do the best I can to get on base, and it's hard to hit like that." On August 2, Bellinger hit his 100th career home run off of Eric Lauer of the San Diego Padres; he did so in only his 401st game, breaking Mike Piazza's Dodgers record of 422 games to 100 home runs. Two weeks later, Bellinger became both the first MLB player of the 2019 season and the youngest Dodger in franchise history to record his 40th home run of the year. Outside of these records, Bellinger's production began to slow after the All-Star break; he batted just .256 in the second half of the season, with a .906 OPS and only 13 home runs in the final 51 games of the year. Part of this was due to conversations with Dodgers staff about ignoring the MVP race in favor of staying calm and building to the postseason. Additionally, pitchers began avoiding throwing strikes to Bellinger where possible; he had 86 walks by September 5, a league-leading 19 of which were intentional. During that year's NLDS, the Washington Nationals bullpen capitalized on areas where Bellinger was comparatively weaker: he faced predominantly left-handed pitchers, who avoided throwing middle-of-the-road fastballs in favor of low and outside pitches that would let Bellinger either swing and miss, foul out, or take a walk.

Bellinger finished the 2019 season with career highs in batting average (.305), home runs (47), and RBIs (115). He also received a trifecta of MLB awards, taking home the MVP award, the NL Gold Glove Award, and the NL Silver Slugger Award. He was the first Dodger in club history to take home all three honors in the same season. He also received two Fielding Bible Awards for his performance both in right field and as a multi-positional player in right field, center field, and at first base. With these titles, he became the first Dodgers outfielder to win any Fielding Bible Award and the first MLB player to pick up two in the same season. Bellinger rounded out the 2019 awards season with a selection to the inaugural All-MLB First Team, joining Yelich and Mike Trout in the outfield.

==== 2020: World Series champions ====
During the 2019–20 MLB offseason, Bellinger signed an $11.5 million contract with the Dodgers for the 2020 season, breaking Kris Bryant's record for the largest single-season contract for a player in his first year eligible for arbitration. When MLB announced the indefinite suspension of the 2020 season due to the COVID-19 pandemic, Bellinger went back to Arizona and focused on tweaking his swing in a "stress-free environment." When the pandemic-shortened season began, Bellinger had a slow start, going 5-for-36 in his first eight games. Unlike in previous years, Bellinger was making weak contact with pitches, leading to a large number of groundouts. His numbers for the whole season saw a drop-off from the previous year: in 56 games of the shortened season, Bellinger hit only .239, with a .789 OPS and only 12 home runs. The 2020 season proved to be a struggle for many of MLB's top hitters: five of the 15 batters who showed the largest drop in slugging percentage were previous MVP winners or finalists, including Bellinger. Bellinger's drops in batting average and slugging percentage, the latter of which fell from .670 in 2019 to .354 in 2020, were explained by his constant experimentation with his swing, which prevented him from locking into pitches the way he had the season prior. Bellinger was once again a finalist for a Gold Glove Award in the outfield, but the award ultimately went to Trent Grisham of the San Diego Padres.

The Dodgers were the first team to clinch a playoff berth in the 2020 season, developing a commanding lead over the NL West by September 16. They finished at the top of their division and went on to sweep the Brewers at the 2020 National League Wild Card Series. From there, the Dodgers faced the Padres in the 2020 NLDS, where Bellinger's defensive play in Game 2 allowed Los Angeles to hang onto their 4–3 lead and take the game. In the seventh inning, with Grisham on second base, Bellinger made a jumping catch to rob Fernando Tatis Jr. of a two-run home run. The 2020 NLCS started with the Dodgers down 3–1 in four games, but they were able to mount a comeback and push the series to seven games. Bellinger scored the go-ahead home run in that final game, clinching the Dodgers' place in the 2020 World Series. There, the Dodgers defeated the Tampa Bay Rays in six games for Bellinger's first World Series championship and the Dodgers' first since 1988. Despite injuring his shoulder during the NLCS, Bellinger continued to play in the World Series, and he celebrated his Game 1 home run by foot-tapping his teammates rather than high-fiving them. After the season, Bellinger signed a one-year, $16.1 million contract with the Dodgers for the 2021 season.

==== 2021: Injuries and regression ====
Bellinger, who had repeatedly injured his right shoulder by diving for ground balls throughout his professional baseball career, underwent surgery on his affected arm in November 2020. He revealed later that while celebrating his NLCS-winning home run that October, he had dislocated his shoulder by connecting too strongly with teammate Enrique Hernández' arm. Bellinger's recovery from the arthroscopic glenoid labrum surgery progressed ahead of schedule, and he was able to join the Dodgers for spring training in 2021. He suffered another serious injury on April 6 after colliding with Oakland Athletics pitcher Reymin Guduan. Bellinger was initially placed on the 10-day injured list before medical scans revealed that he had suffered a hairline fracture in his left fibula. He returned on May 29, going 0-for-4 with two strikeouts in an 11–6 loss to the Giants, but a sixth-inning walk allowed Bellinger to extend his on-base streak to 20 games.

Bellinger's return from injury was marked by a career-worst offensive performance. In his first 11 games back, he struck out 14 times while recording only one extra-base hit. While his defense remained sharp in center field, by July 23, Bellinger was batting under .200 both at home and on the road. He admitted in August that his poor batting was due to lingering pain and weakness from both the shoulder and leg injuries, and Bellinger's batting grew stronger as he continued to exercise the affected areas. At the end of the month, Roberts decided to relegate Bellinger to a platoon role in the outfield, starting A. J. Pollock, Mookie Betts, or Chris Taylor against left-handed pitchers. Injuries to Pollock and Taylor, however, forced the Dodgers to renege on that platoon system shortly after its introduction. Bellinger suffered his third major injury of the season in September, when a collision with teammate Gavin Lux resulted in a fractured rib. By the time of the collision, Bellinger had already missed 46 games that season with his fractured fibula, and an additional seven with hamstring tightness. Bellinger finished the regular season batting a career-low .165, with ten home runs and 36 RBIs in 315 at bats.

In the Wild Card Game against the St. Louis Cardinals, he reached base three times and stole twice. In Game 2 of the NLDS match against division rivals the San Francisco Giants, Bellinger's two-RBI double provided the go-ahead runs for an ultimate 9–2 rout of San Francisco. Bellinger's game-winning RBI single in Game 5 of the NLDS not only helped the Dodgers to defeat the Giants and advance to the NLCS, but it helped him tie Manny Ramirez and Gene Tenace's record of three career go-ahead hits in winner-take-all games. In Game 3 of the NLCS, the Dodgers were down 5–2 against the Atlanta Braves when Bellinger hit a three-run home run in the eighth inning. After Bellinger tied the game and cleared the bases, a single and stolen base from Chris Taylor, followed by an RBI double from Mookie Betts, helped the Dodgers win the game 6–5. The home run pitch from Luke Jackson, a 96 mph (154 km/h) fastball, crossed the plate while 4.12 feet (1.26 m) above the ground, making it very difficult to hit. It was Bellinger's first home run of the season that had been thrown outside the strike zone. Dave Roberts told reporters after the game that "it's just hard to imagine a bigger hit." Although the Dodgers went on to lose to the Braves in six games, Bellinger recorded 12 hits and seven RBIs in 34 postseason at bats.

==== 2022: Final season in LA ====
On December 23, Bellinger signed a $17 million contract with the Dodgers, avoiding salary arbitration. In 2022, Bellinger had the lowest on-base percentage of all qualified hitters in the majors at .265, he also had a .210 batting average with 19 home runs and 68 RBIs and struck out 150 times in 504 at-bats. After the season, the Dodgers non-tendered him, making him a free agent.

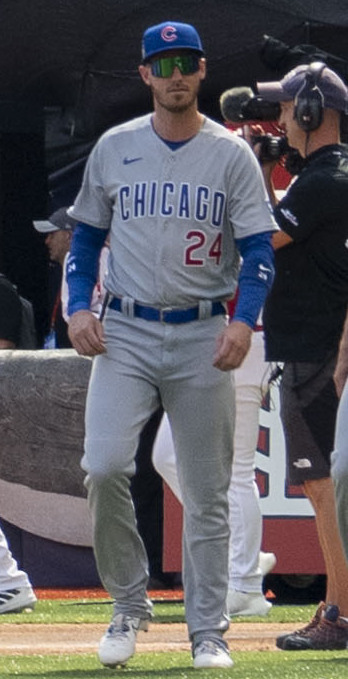
Bellinger with the Cubs at the 2023 MLB London Series.

=== Chicago Cubs (2023–24) ===
==== 2023: NL Comeback Player of the Year ====
On December 14, 2022, Bellinger signed a one-year contract with a mutual option for 2024 with the Chicago Cubs. Bellinger was named the National League Player of the Month for July 2023. He had eight home runs, 24 RBIs, and a .400 batting average over that span. For the season, he had a .307 batting average and hit 26 home runs while driving in 97 RBI.

==== 2024 ====
On November 3, 2023, Bellinger declined his mutual option and became a free agent. On February 27, 2024, he re-signed with the Cubs on a three-year, $80 million contract containing opt-out clauses after each of the first two seasons. Bellinger finished the 2024 season with a .266 average, 18 home runs, and 78 RBIs, and exercised the option on his contract for the 2025 season.

=== New York Yankees (2025–present) ===
==== 2025 ====
Bellinger with the Yankees during a Spring Training interview in 2025

On December 17, 2024, the Cubs traded Bellinger with $5 million in cash considerations to the New York Yankees in exchange for Cody Poteet. On May 4, 2025, Bellinger hit a two-run homer off Taj Bradley of the Tampa Bay Rays, his 200th career home run. On June 10, Bellinger recorded his 1,000th career hit when he hit an RBI single to right-center field off of pitcher Taylor Clarke in the sixth inning. On July 11, Bellinger hit three home runs against the Chicago Cubs as the Yankees won 11–0. It was Bellinger's first career three-homer game. On September 2, Bellinger was named the American League Player of the Week for the 23rd week of the season after going 12-for-27 (.444) and slugging 1.278 with two home runs and eight RBI in that period, including three doubles and two home runs. It was his first AL POTW honor and his first POTW honor since 2022. Bellinger finished the 2025 season with a .272/.334/.480 slash line, with 29 home runs, and 98 RBI. He opted-out of his contractual player option for the 2026 season, making him a free agent.

==== 2026: All-Star Game MVP & Platinum Glove Award ====
During the offseason, Bellinger was one of the most highly rated free agent position players and reportedly attracted varying degrees of interest from several teams. On January 26, 2026, Bellinger re-signed with the Yankees to a five-year contract, which included a total value of $162.5 million, with player opt-outs after the second and third years of the contract and a full no-trade clause. Bellinger was named an All-Star in 2026, his first time since 2019 with the Dodgers, and subsequently won the All Star MVP, after scoring the winning runs of the game in the 1st with a 2 RBI single.

On November 1, 2026, Bellinger won the Rawlings Gold Glove Award for the second time in his career for the left field. On November 5, Bellinger was named the finalist for the Silver Slugger Award in the American League for the outfield. On November 6, Bellinger won the American League Platinum Glove Award, marking the first Platinum Glove Award in his career and becoming the first player in MLB to win MVP and Platinum Glove Awards in his professional baseball career.

== Batting style ==
Bellinger, originally much weaker while batting than fielding, became a power hitter after making a change to his batting stance during the 2014–15 offseason. Working with Shawn Wooten and Damon Mashore, Bellinger incorporated a small hand and wrist movement into his "load phase," which prepared him to make strong contact with the ball. In response to concerns that he was "standing too tall and straight-legged" in the batter's box during the 2018 season, making it difficult to build momentum, Bellinger made a number of other changes during the 2018–19 offseason, including adopting a more relaxed position at the plate and aiming to hit under breaking balls rather than over. These changes, coupled with showing greater discretion in choosing when to swing, helped Bellinger make contact more frequently and with greater power during his MVP season.

== Awards and honors ==
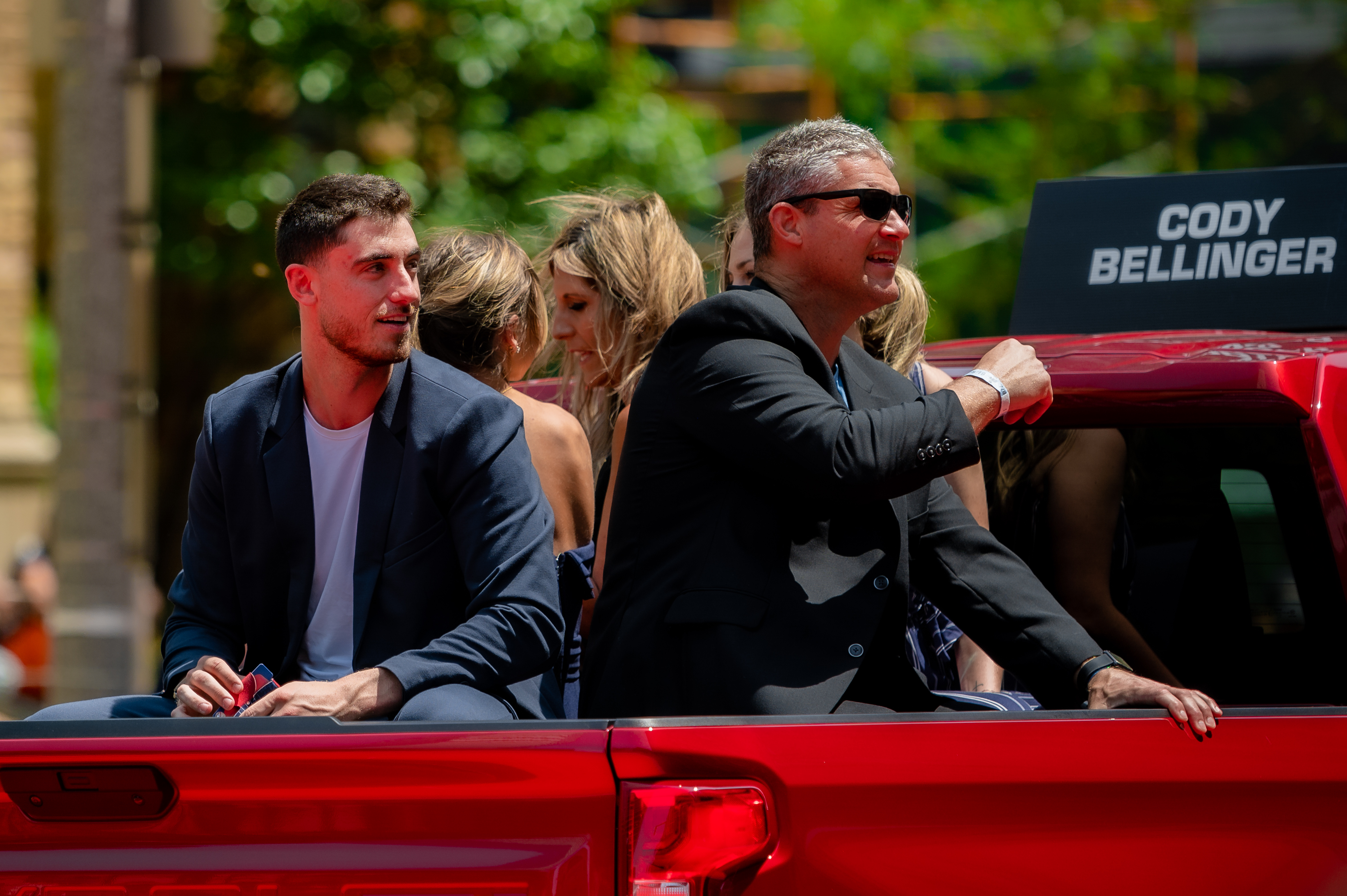
Bellinger (left) with his father, Clay, on the red carpet for the 2019 MLB All-Star Game

Award	Season(s)	Ref.
MLB
World Series champion	2020	
MLB All-Star	2017, 2019, 2026	
All-MLB First Team	2019	
NL Most Valuable Player	2019	
All-Star Game MVP	2026	
NL Silver Slugger Award	2019, 2023	
Platinum Glove Award	2026	
Gold Glove Award	2019, 2026	
Fielding Bible Award	2019 (x2), 2026	
NLCS Most Valuable Player	2018	
NL Rookie of the Year	2017	
NL Comeback Player of the Year	2023	
MLB Players Choice NL Outstanding Rookie	2017	
Baseball America Major League All-Rookie Team	2017	
Home Run Derby participant	2017	
MiLB
Arizona Fall League Top Prospects Team	2016	
All-Arizona Fall League Team	2016	
Baseball America Double-A All-Star	2016	
California League Championship Series Most Valuable Player	2015	
California League Post-Season All-Star	2015	
California League Mid-Season All-Star	2015	

== Personal life ==
Bellinger has one brother, Cole, who is four years his junior. A standout pitcher for Hamilton High School, Cole was selected by the San Diego Padres in the 15th round of the 2017 MLB draft. Cole played for two seasons in the Padres farm system before retiring from baseball in 2021.

Bellinger has two daughters with wife Chase Carter, born November 2021 and April 2023.

A character inspired by Bellinger makes a cameo appearance in the video game Assassin's Creed Valhalla. The player character must defeat Viking Otta Sluggasson, who wields a tree trunk like a baseball bat, during one story section. Bellinger, an avid gamer, recorded his movements using motion capture technology, with his own baseball bat serving as Sluggasson's weapon.

== See also ==
- List of Major League Baseball home run records
- List of Major League Baseball players to hit for the cycle
- List of Major League Baseball postseason records
- List of Major League Baseball single-inning runs batted in leaders
- List of Major League Baseball career home run leaders
- List of people from Chandler, Arizona
- List of second-generation Major League Baseball players
- Los Angeles Dodgers award winners and league leaders

Awards and achievements
Preceded by Nolan Arenado	Hitting for the cycle July 15, 2017	Succeeded by Evan Longoria
Preceded by Christian Yelich; Ronald Acuña Jr.	National League Player of the Month; April 2019; July 2023	Succeeded by Josh Bell; Mookie Betts
