= Charles Carter (Bahamian journalist) =

Bahamian journalist and politician (1943–2023)

Sir Charles Carter, KCMG (13 April 1943 – 15 May 2021), was a prominent Bahamian broadcast journalist, politician, and businessman. Known for his contributions to broadcasting and media, he hosted several influential shows and played a significant role in the development of television in the Bahamas. He also made contributions to the political landscape of the country, serving as a member of the House of Assembly of the Bahamas for ten years and a cabinet minister.

== Early life and education ==
Born Edward Charles Carter to Harcourt and Mary Carter (née Heastie) on 13 April 1943, Carter spent his formative years in Nassau, Bahamas.

He attended St. John's College in Nassau and later studied at the Rhodes School in New York, where he completed his high school education. In 1961, he enrolled at New York University, pursuing a Bachelor of Science in Business Administration. Carter also attended the Ryerson Polytechnical Institute in Toronto, Canada, where he obtained a degree in broadcast management in 1969.

He completed his studies at the University of Manchester in England in 1974, earning a certificate in public administration.

== Broadcasting career ==
Carter's career in broadcasting began in 1964 when he joined the Broadcasting Corporation of the Bahamas as a radio announcer. He served in this role for seven years before being promoted to the position of program director in 1970.

In 1976, he was appointed assistant general manager and played a pivotal role in establishing the television service in the Bahamas. Two years later, Carter was named the general manager of television for the national network.

In addition to his work in broadcasting, Carter ventured into entrepreneurship. In 1993, he established Carter Marketing alongside his two sons. The company specialised in advertising and public relations.

In late 1999, he was granted a license to operate Island FM, a radio station, further expanding his influence in the media landscape.

== Political career ==
In 1982, Carter was elected to the House of Assembly of the Bahamas, representing the Holy Cross Constituency. He was reelected in 1987. He served as Minister of Health and Minister of Foreign Affairs and was appointed to the Senate in 1997.

== Honors and awards ==
Sir Charles Carter's contributions to broadcasting, journalism, and mass communications were recognised with prestigious honours and awards.

In 2014, Carter received the Bahamas Press Club's Étienne Dupuch Lifetime Achievement Award in recognition of his profound impact on the development of journalism and mass communications in the Bahamas, spanning five decades.

He was appointed a Knight Commander of the Most Distinguished Order of Saint Michael and Saint George (KCMG) in the Queen's 2016 New Year Honours for his services to Broadcasting and the Media. He was invested in June 2016 at an investiture ceremony presided over by Princess Anne, the Princess Royal.

== Death and legacy ==
Carter died on 15 May 2021, aged 78. He was survived by his wife, Muriell, two sons, and five grandchildren, including models Tess and Chase Carter.
