= Shishu Bharati =

Shishu Bharati School of Languages and Culture of India
- Lexington, Massachusetts; United States

Information
- Type: Private, non-profit institution
- Motto: Let Everyone See Good
- Established: 1980
- Grades: Class KG - 8
- Website: www.shishubharati.net

Shishu Bharati is a non-profit volunteer-managed school in New England area of the United States of America. The three branches of Shishishu Bharati are located in Lexington, Massachusetts, Nashua, New Hampshire, and Walpole, Massachusetts. The school runs from September through June, with classes being held every Sunday (except Holidays) from 10:00 am to 12:25 pm.

The curriculum consists of programs in Gujarati, Hindi, Kannada, Marathi, Sanskrit, Tamil, and Telugu, as well as a program in Indian culture. The school also offers a kindergarten class and Yoga and Advanced Culture classes for adults.

== History ==
Shishu Bharati was established in the year 1978. The group later moved to St. Anne's School in Arlington, Massachusetts and registered as a non-profit organization.

Over the years, Shishu Bharati has grown to be huge in the New England area. They have an annual graduation each year for all of the 8th grade students and have culture and language days for the kids to share their knowledge.

== Recognition ==
On the 57th Republic Day of India, January 26, 2007, Shishu Bharati was honored with a Plaque of Recognition, for their tireless and dedicated service to New England community for over 25 years, by India Association of Greater Boston, an Indian-American umbrella organization in New England area.
