= Walpole High School =

Coordinates: 42.1361°N 71.2477°W

- 275 Common Street, Walpole, MA 02081; United States

Information
- Type: Public high school
- Motto: "Educating All Students to Achieve Success"
- Established: 1870
- School district: Walpole Public Schools
- Superintendent: Bridget A. Gough
- Principal: Stephen Imbusch
- Faculty: 85.8
- Grades: 9–12
- Enrollment: 946 (2023–2024)
- Colors: Blue and orange
- Athletics conference: Bay State Conference
- Team name: Timberwolves
- Newspaper: The Searchlight
- Website: www.walpole.k12.ma.us/o/whs

Walpole High School (WHS) is a four-year public high school in Walpole, Massachusetts, United States, within Norfolk County. The school educates students grades 9 through 12 and is the only high school in the Walpole Public School district. As of 2013, the school has about 1,300 students and over 90 faculty and staff members. The campus is located one mile from downtown Walpole on Common Street.

The school is mainly focused on college preparatory subjects, with over 90 percent of its graduates typically going on to higher education. It is accredited is by the New England Association of Secondary Schools.

Walpole High School was founded in 1870 and the current building was originally built in 1907 and has undergone several expansions and renovations.

== Curriculum ==
Walpole High School offers many academic courses in various levels to challenge students in English, foreign language, history, mathematics and sciences.

The former assistant superintendent, Jean Kenney stated in 2015 that almost every student takes at least two years of foreign language instruction even though the high school only requires one year. As of 2026, foreign languages offered included French, Latin, and Spanish. In 2015, about 600 students studied Spanish, about 150 studied French, about 100 studied Latin, about 45 students studied German, and about 30 studied Chinese. Kenney stated in 2015 that many students take at least two foreign languages. The former chairperson of foreign languages, George Watson, promoted establishing German classes, saying that there was a need to offer a foreign language not in the Romance languages. As of 2015, few other schools in Massachusetts offered German.

Additionally, Walpole High School offers an extensive choice of electives and AP classes covering all academic areas.

== Extracurricular activities ==
Walpole High School offers extracurricular activities including varsity level sports, a student council, a robotics team, an annual film festival, a dance company, a speech and debate team, an orchestra, a band, a chorus, and a theatre program. The school also offers a television program in a television studio.

== Controversies ==
The school's sports teams were named "Rebels" in 1966, leading to decades of incorporation of the confederate flag and singing "Dixie" in sporting events and hazing rituals. After criticism that these glorified the confederate cause of slavery, the flag was banned in 1994, and the "Rebels" name was removed by the School Committee in 2020, during the uprise of the Black Lives Matter movement and George Floyd protests. In April 2021, after a student and staff vote, Walpole High School adapted a new mascot, "Timberwolves".

== Notable alumni ==
- Todd Collins, football quarterback
- Charles Farrell, actor in the 1920s and 1930s
- Georgia Mae Harp, country music singer
- Mike Milbury, former Boston Bruins player and head coach, commentator at NBCSN
- Joe Morgan, former Boston Red Sox manager and professional baseball player (Milwaukee Braves, Kansas City Athletics, Philadelphia Phillies, Cleveland Indians, St. Louis Cardinals)
- Cam Schlittler, professional baseball player
