= Francis William Bird Park =

Park in Walpole, Massachusetts, United States

Coordinates: 42°9′25″N 71°12′55.5″W

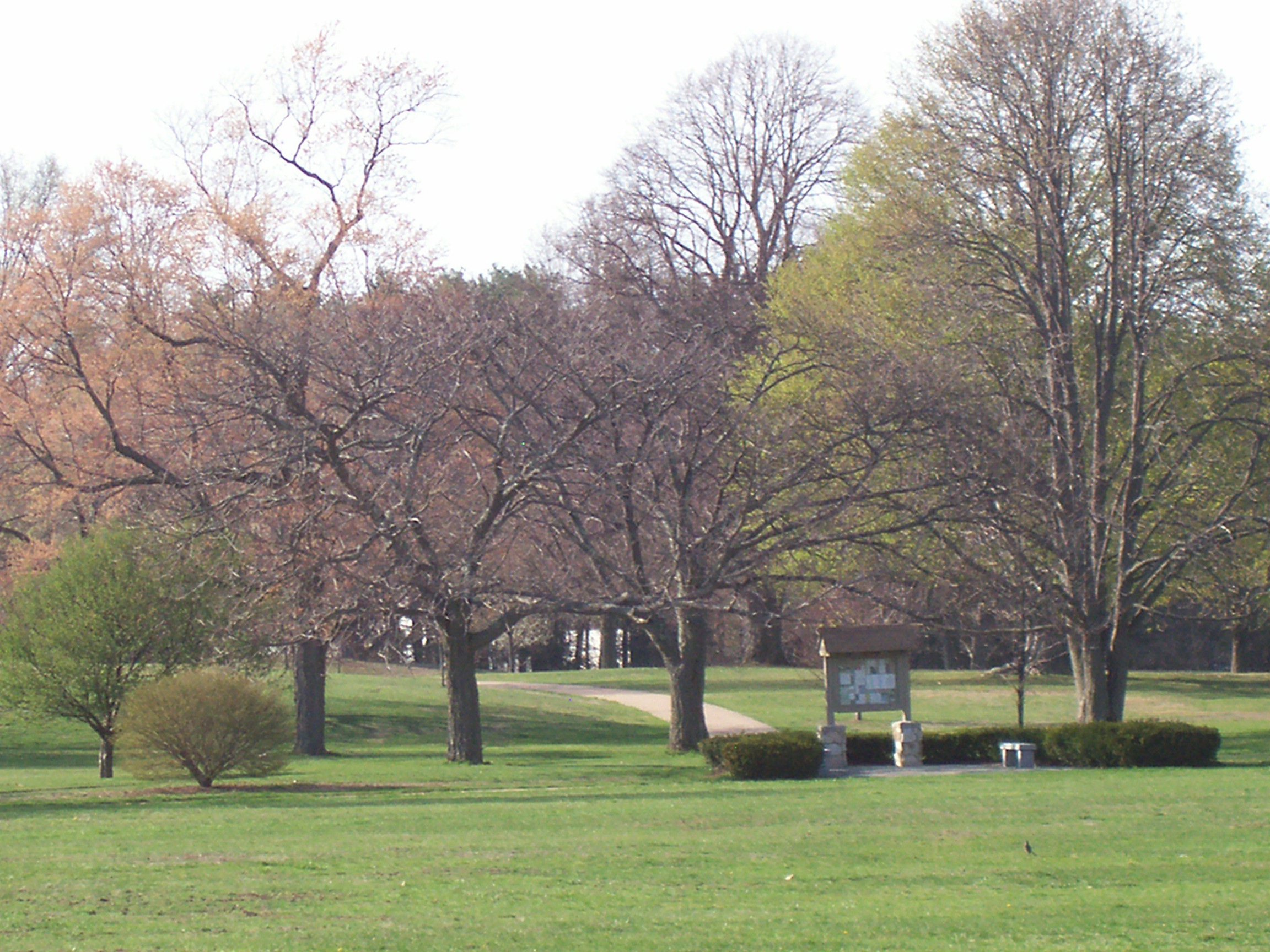
- Bird Park
- Interactive map of Francis William Bird Park
- Established: 1925
- Operator: The Trustees of Reservations
- Website: Francis William Bird Park

Francis William Bird Park is an 89-acre (36-hectare) landscaped and waterscape park located in Walpole, Massachusetts. The Trustees of Reservations owns and maintains the park. Features include over 3 miles (4.8 km) of walking and bicycle paths that wind through the park, traversing streams across granite bridges and passing through rolling lawns punctuated with mature shade trees, groves, and ponds.

Facilities at the park include bike racks, benches, trash receptacles, public restroom (open seasonally), a "tot lot" with children's play equipment, four tennis courts, a basketball backboard, and an outdoor stage. As of June 2010, the "tot lot" no longer features a children's play area. A parking lot is located on Polley Lane in East Walpole.

== History ==
Bird Park was created and endowed in 1925 by local industrialist Charles Sumner Bird, Sr. and his wife Anna in memory of their eldest son, Francis William Bird who had died seven years earlier.

Landscape architect and town planner John Nolen, a protégé of Frederick Law Olmsted, designed the park. A social reformer, Nolen believed that parks were critical to the health of urban residents and should be designed to provide a place of respite and relaxation in nature. In his original design plan, Nolen wrote that this park should be

... a sequestered breathing place in the heart of East Walpole ... a combination of broad, sun-swept meadowlands, speckled with shadowed glades, higher tree-screened knolls for the lover of shade, the whole set to the music of a babbling stream.

For most of its history, the park was owned and maintained by the Francis William Park Trust. By the later decades of the 20th century, parts of the park suffered badly from vandalism and neglect.

In 1998, Irene Kennedy of Foxborough, Massachusetts, was murdered in the woods of the park. In 2003, DNA found on the victim was matched with that of Martin Guy, a pizza delivery man already incarcerated for the murder of his neighbor, Christopher Payne. A plaque in the ground under the park’s news board celebrates Kennedy's memory.

The Trustees of Reservations gained possession of the property in 2002 and engaged in a number of renovations, including the planting of ornamental trees such as Cherry and Japanese Maple and the installation of flower beds. Recently, The Trustees of Reservations have begun the recreation of the Rhododendron Pathway through a memorial gift program.

== Ellis Field ==
Recognizing the need for many forms of recreation, the Bird family provided a sister property for active sports when Bird Park was created. Now known as Ellis Field or Bird Athletic Field, this nearby 7-acre (28,000 m^{2}) recreation area (at June and East Streets in Walpole) was originally used by workers from mills owned by the Bird family. It is currently used by the town for team sports.
