= Clay Bellinger =

American baseball player (born 1968)

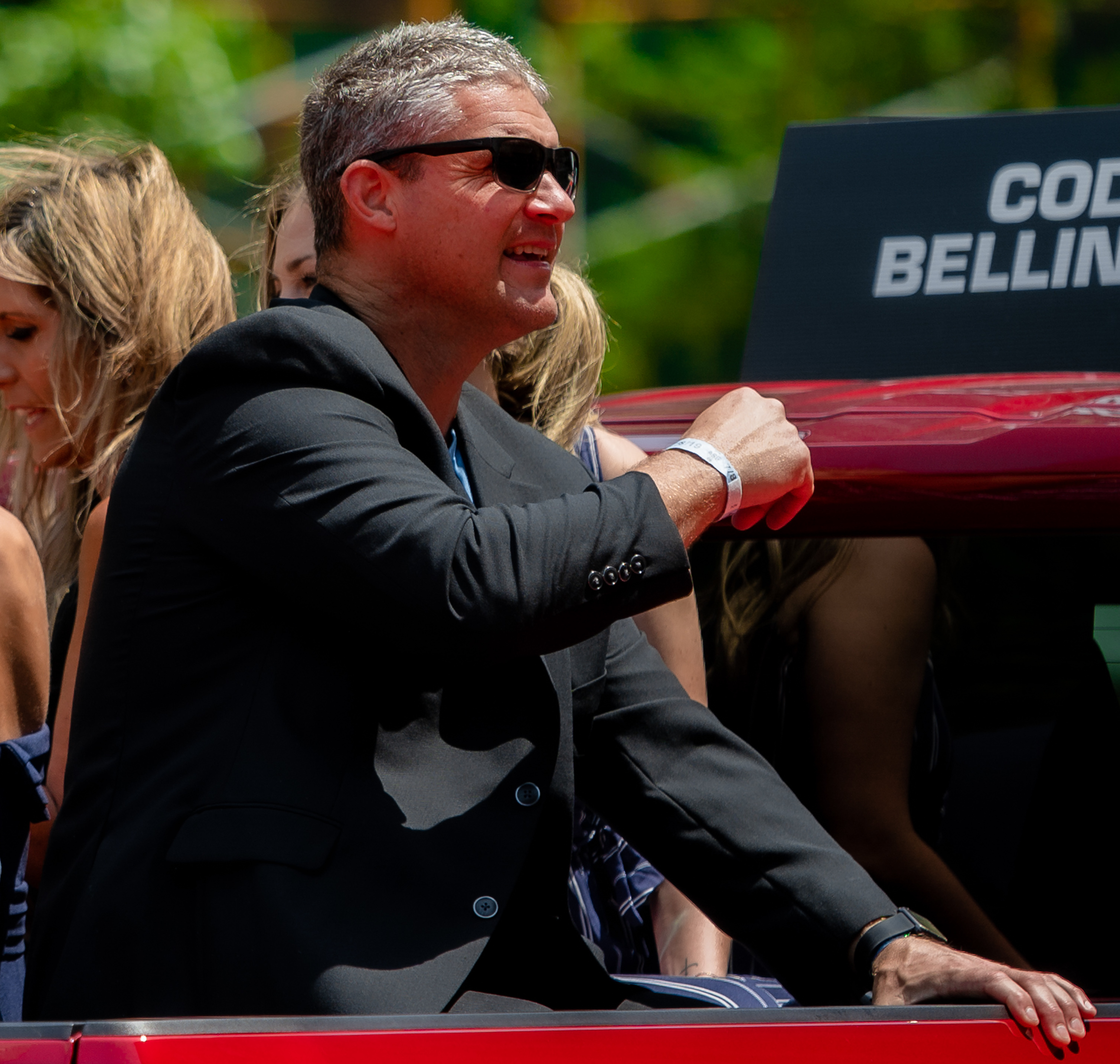
- Bellinger in 2019
- Utility player
- Born: November 18, 1968 (age 57); Oneonta, New York, U.S.
- Batted: Right Threw: Right

MLB debut
- April 9, 1999, for the New York Yankees

Last MLB appearance
- April 8, 2002, for the Anaheim Angels

MLB statistics
- Batting average: .193
- Home runs: 12
- Runs batted in: 35
- Stats at Baseball Reference

Teams
- New York Yankees (1999–2001); Anaheim Angels (2002)

Career highlights and awards
- 2× World Series champion (1999, 2000)

Clayton Daniel Bellinger (born November 18, 1968) is an American former professional baseball player. He played in Major League Baseball (MLB) for the New York Yankees and the Anaheim Angels, winning the World Series twice as a member of the Yankees. He was also on the Angels team that won the 2002 World Series but did not receive a championship ring since he only appeared in two regular-season games.

His son, Cody Bellinger, is also a professional baseball player who won the 2019 National League (NL) Most Valuable Player (MVP) award and won the 2020 World Series.

== Early life ==
A native of Oneonta, New York, Bellinger played shortstop for Rollins College in Winter Park, Florida.

== Career ==
Bellinger was drafted by the San Francisco Giants in the second round (44th overall pick) in the 1989 draft. His first 10 seasons of professional baseball were spent in the minor leagues, six in Triple-A. Before his first call-up as a 30-year-old in 1999, he played more than 1,000 minor league games. Bellinger played for the New York Yankees in 1999, 2000, and 2001. He played every position (including designated hitter) except for catcher and pitcher.

In the ninth inning of Game 2 of the 2000 World Series, Bellinger was inserted in left field in place of David Justice. Bellinger reached up with his arm fully extended to rob the Mets' Todd Zeile of a two-run home run and preserve a victory for the Yankees. The Yankees released him when he became eligible for arbitration; Bellinger then signed with the Anaheim Angels. He played two games at first base for the Angels in 2002, had one at-bat in which he struck out, and was eventually demoted to the minor leagues.

== International career ==
While playing in the Baltimore Orioles system in 2004, he was recruited by owner Peter Angelos to play for the Greek baseball team in the 2004 Summer Olympics held in Athens. Bellinger has Greek grandparents, and Angelos was in charge of the Greek national baseball team. In order to field a competitive team in the Olympics, Angelos made the decision to use experienced American players with mostly distant Greek ancestry (players' ancestry eligibility was allowed to date as far back as great-grandparents), as opposed to native Greeks due to their inexperience in a country where baseball was almost never played. Bellinger agreed as he hoped it would earn him a September call-up to the Orioles' roster when the Olympics were over. The Greek team went 1–6 and failed to advance to the medal round. Bellinger was one of a handful of players on the roster with Major League experience, and the only player to have won a World Series ring. He was not promoted to the Orioles' roster after the games concluded.

== After baseball ==
Bellinger was the assistant coach of the Chandler, Arizona Little League All-Stars, who advanced to the 2007 Little League World Series.

As of 2017, Bellinger has been working for several years as a firefighter in Gilbert, Arizona.

== Personal life ==
Bellinger and his wife, Jennifer, have a daughter, Ashli, and two sons: Cody, who plays for the New York Yankees and Cole, who was drafted by the San Diego Padres in 2017. Clay pitched to Cody in the 2017 Home Run Derby.
