= Chase Carter =

Bahamian model

- Born: June 10, 1997 (age 28); Nassau, The Bahamas
- Spouse: Cody Bellinger (m. 2023)
- Children: 2
- Modeling information
- Height: 1.77 m (5 ft 9 1/2 in)
- Hair color: Blonde
- Eye color: Blue
- Agency: IMG Models

Chase Carter (born June 10, 1997) is a Bahamian model. She has been on the cover of Maxim magazine.

== Early life ==
Carter was born to Mark and Denise Carter.

Her grandfather is Sir Charles Carter, a radio broadcaster and former Member of Parliament and Cabinet Minister.

== Career ==
Carter was scouted at the Sydney Airport when she was 13. She was a rookie in the 2018 Sports Illustrated Swimsuit Issue. She has modeled for Pink (Victoria's Secret), and also for Polo Ralph Lauren, Maybelline, Philipp Plein, and has also appeared in V and Galore magazines.

== Personal life ==
Carter has a sister named Tess and a brother.

Between 2018 and 2019, Carter dated Major League Baseball player Giancarlo Stanton.

On July 13, 2021, she announced she and New York Yankees first baseman-outfielder Cody Bellinger were expecting a child together, a girl. Their daughter was born in November 2021. Carter and Bellinger had a second daughter in April 2023. They married in December 2023.
