= Walpole Public Schools =

School district in Massachusetts, United States

Coordinates: 42.1487°N 71.2320°W

Walpole Public Schools is a school district serving Walpole, Massachusetts.

In 2012, voters approved a budget override. Jean Kenney, the assistant superintendent, stated in 2015 that the district would have closed its middle school foreign languages program if the override did not pass, and that parents who wanted foreign language instruction to remain had passed the override.

== Schools ==
- Walpole High School
- Walpole Middle School

Elementary schools:

- Boyden School
- Elm Street School
- Fisher School
- Old Post Road School

Preschools:

- Daniel Feeney Preschool Center
