= 2007 Little League World Series =

Children's baseball tournament

Tournament details
- Dates: August 17–August 26
- Teams: 16

Final positions
- Champions: Warner Robins American Little League (United States) (Georgia (U.S. state)) Warner Robins, Georgia
- Runners-up: Tokyo Kitasuna Little League; Tokyo, Japan

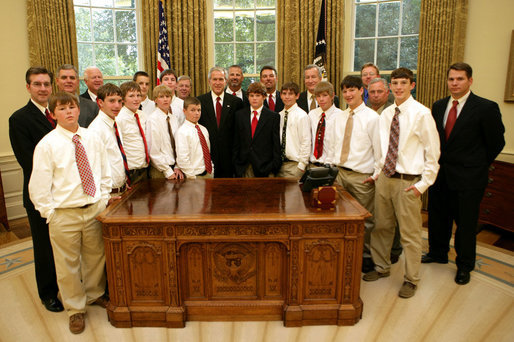
Warner Robins, Georgia Little League team, champions of the 2007 Little League World Series.

The 2007 Little League World Series was a baseball tournament held August 17 through August 26 in South Williamsport, Pennsylvania. Eight teams from the United States and eight from throughout the world competed to decide the winner of the 61st installment of the Little League World Series. On August 26, the U.S. champion from Warner Robins, Georgia, defeated the international champion from Tokyo, Japan, 3–2 in 8 innings, on a walk-off home run by Dalton Carriker. This was the second straight year that a team from Georgia won the championship.

The series was marked by dramatic finishes. The championship final was the third elimination game in the tournament to end with a walk-off homer. In the international bracket, one of the semifinals ended with the team from Willemstad, Curaçao, defeating the team from Maracaibo, Venezuela, on a three-run, come-from-behind walk-off shot in the 7th inning. The Curaçao team became the victim of a come-from-behind walk-off grand slam in the international final two days later.

The tournament was televised on ESPN, ESPN2, and ABC. Games were held in the two stadiums located at Little League headquarters in South Williamsport:

- Howard J. Lamade Stadium — the main stadium, opened in 1959, with seating for 10,000 in the stands and hillside terrace seating for up to 30,000 more
- Little League Volunteer Stadium — a newer facility, opened in 2001, that seats slightly over 5,000, primarily in the stands

== Groups ==
Between five and sixteen teams competed in regional tournaments to progress to the Little League World Series, which varied from straight-knockout competitions (Japan) to the group/elimination format used in the United States. 2007 was the first year that Japan received its own regional playoff, with the Asia (Japan's former home) and Pacific regions merging to create the new Asia-Pacific group.

Pool A	Pool B	Pool C	Pool D
(Massachusetts) Walpole, Massachusetts; New England Region; Walpole American Little League	(Maryland) Salisbury, Maryland; Mid-Atlantic Region; West Salisbury Little League	(Curaçao) Willemstad, Curaçao; Caribbean Region; Pabao Little League	Mexicali, Baja California; Mexico Region; Seguro Social Little League
(Oregon) Lake Oswego, Oregon; Northwest Region; Lake Oswego Little League	(Arizona) Chandler, Arizona; West Region; Chandler National Little League	Tokyo; Japan Region; Tokyo Kitasuna Little League	Taichung, Chinese Taipei (Taiwan); Asia-Pacific Region; Li-Shing Little League
(Georgia (U.S. state)) Warner Robins, Georgia; Southeast Region; Warner Robins American Little League	(Texas) Lubbock, Texas; Southwest Region; Lubbock Western Little League	Surrey, British Columbia; Canada Region; White Rock/South Surrey Little League	(Netherlands) Apeldoorn, Netherlands; Europe, Middle East and Africa (EMEA) Region; Windmills Little League
(Ohio) Hamilton, Ohio; Great Lakes Region; West Side Little League	(Minnesota) Coon Rapids, Minnesota; Midwest Region; Coon Rapids National Little League	(Saudi Arabia) Dhahran, Saudi Arabia; Transatlantic Region; Arabian American Little League	Maracaibo, Venezuela; Latin America Region; La Victoria Little League

- Taiwan participates under the name Chinese Taipei in many sporting events, including Little League Baseball (LLB).

== Results ==
=== Pool play ===
The top two teams in each pool move on to their respective semifinals. The winners of each met on August 26 to play for the Little League World Championship. Teams marked in green qualified to the knockout stage, while the remaining teams were eliminated.

Ties are broken based on records in head-to-head competition among tied teams. In the event of a three-way tie for first place, the tie is broken by calculating the ratio of runs allowed to defensive innings played for all teams involved in the tie. The team with the lowest runs-per-defensive-inning ratio is ranked first and advances. Second place is determined by the head-to-head result of the other two teams. If the three-way tie is for 2nd place, the runs-per-defensive-inning ratio rule is used. The team with the lowest run ratio advances, the other two teams are eliminated.

==== United States ====
Pool A
Rank	Region	Record	Runs Allowed	Run Ratio
1	(Georgia (U.S. state)) Southeast	2–1	15	0.882
2	(Oregon) Northwest	2–1	10	0.588
3	(Massachusetts) New England	1–2	11	0.647
4	(Ohio) Great Lakes	1–2	11	0.647

Pool B
Rank	Region	Record	Runs Allowed	Run Ratio
1	(Texas) Southwest	2–0	1	0.083
2	(Arizona) West	2–1	13	0.722
3	(Minnesota) Midwest	1–2	18	1.000
4	(Maryland) Mid-Atlantic	0–2	20	1.667

All times US EDT

Pool	Home	Score	Away	Score	Time (Venue)
August 17
A	(Ohio) Great Lakes	2	(Massachusetts) New England	3	2:00 pm (Volunteer Stadium)
A	(Georgia (U.S. state)) Southeast	9	(Oregon) Northwest	4	8:00 pm (Lamade Stadium)
August 18
B	(Maryland) Mid-Atlantic	6	(Arizona) West	16	3:00 pm (Lamade Stadium)
B	(Texas) Southwest	6	(Minnesota) Midwest	0	6:00 pm (Volunteer Stadium)
A	(Ohio) Great Lakes	10	(Georgia (U.S. state)) Southeast	2	8:00 pm (Lamade Stadium)
August 19
B	(Arizona) West	1	(Texas) Southwest	5	Noon (Volunteer Stadium)
A	(Oregon) Northwest	1	(Massachusetts) New England	0	3:30 pm (Lamade Stadium)
B	(Maryland) Mid-Atlantic	3	(Minnesota) Midwest	4	8:00 pm (Lamade Stadium)
August 21
A	(Ohio) Great Lakes	1	(Oregon) Northwest	6	3:00 pm (Lamade Stadium)
August 22
A	(Massachusetts) New England	1	(Georgia (U.S. state)) Southeast	8	11:00 am (Volunteer Stadium) (Note: The Southeast vs. New England game started at 6:00 pm EDT on August 21, and was suspended due to rain with two outs in the top of the 2nd inning with Southeast leading 2–0. The game was resumed at 11:00 am on August 22.)
B	(Arizona) West	9	(Minnesota) Midwest	2	4:00 pm (Lamade Stadium)
B	(Texas) Southwest		(Maryland) Mid-Atlantic		Canceled (Note: Due to rain, two games that would have had no effect on pool standings were canceled in order to allow other games to be played: Southwest vs. Mid-Atlantic in Pool B and Japan vs. Transatlantic in Pool C. However, the games counted in determining pitching eligibility.)

==== International ====
Pool C
Rank	Region	Record	Runs Allowed	Run Ratio
1	Japan	2–0	4	0.333
2	(Curaçao) Caribbean	2–1	12	0.667
3	Canada	1–2	18	1.059
4	Saudi Arabia	0–2	15	1.500

Pool D
Rank	Region	Record	Runs Allowed	Run Ratio
1	(Venezuela) Latin America	3–0	4	0.222
2	(Chinese Taipei) Asia-Pacific	2–1	5	0.300
3	Mexico	1–2	16	1.000
4	(Netherlands) EMEA	0–3	43	3.909

All times US EDT

Pool	Home	Score	Away	Score	Time (Venue)
August 17
C	(Curaçao) Caribbean	3	Japan	10	4:00 pm (Volunteer Stadium)
D	(Venezuela) Latin America	2	(Chinese Taipei) Asia-Pacific	1	6:00 pm (Volunteer Stadium)
August 18
C	Saudi Arabia	5	Canada	13	11:00 am (Lamade Stadium)
D	Mexico	11 (F/4)	(Netherlands) EMEA	1	1:00 pm (Lamade Stadium)
August 19
D	(Netherlands) EMEA	1	(Chinese Taipei) Asia-Pacific	11 (F/5)	4:00 pm (Volunteer Stadium)
C	Saudi Arabia	0	(Curaçao) Caribbean	2	7:00 pm (Volunteer Stadium)
August 21
C	Canada	1	Japan	7	1:00 pm (Lamade Stadium)
D	(Netherlands) EMEA	2	(Venezuela) Latin America	21 (F/4)	4:00 pm (Volunteer Stadium)
August 22
D	(Chinese Taipei) Asia-Pacific	4	Mexico	2	Noon (Lamade Stadium)
C	(Curaçao) Caribbean	6	Canada	2	2:00 pm* (Volunteer Stadium)
C	Japan		Saudi Arabia		Canceled
D	(Venezuela) Latin America	11	Mexico	1	7:00 pm (Volunteer Stadium)

=== Elimination round ===
Quarter-finals
August 23 – Noon - Volunteer (F/7)
(Venezuela) Latin America	2
(Curaçao) Caribbean	4
August 23 – 5:00 pm - Volunteer (F/10)
Japan	4
(Chinese Taipei) Asia-Pacific	3
August 23 – 3:00 pm - Lamade
(Texas) Southwest	8
(Oregon) Northwest	2
August 23 – 7:30 pm - Lamade (F/5)
(Georgia (U.S. state)) Southeast	16
(Arizona) West	6

Semi-finals
August 25 – 12:30 pm - Lamade
(Curaçao) Caribbean	4
Japan	7
August 25 – 3:30 pm - Lamade
(Texas) Southwest	2
(Georgia (U.S. state)) Southeast	5

Final
August 26 – 3:30 pm - Lamade (F/8)
Japan	2
(United States) (Georgia (U.S. state)) Southeast	3
Third place
August 26 – Noon - Volunteer
(Curaçao) Caribbean	0
(United States) (Texas) Southwest	1

2007 Little League World Series Champions
Warner Robins American Little League
Warner Robins, Georgia

== Television coverage ==
For the first time, all 32 games of the tournament, from the opening pitch to the final out, were scheduled for a live telecast in the United States. All but one of the broadcasts were to be on either ESPN, ESPN2 or ABC. (The remaining game, the August 19 Pabao vs. Arabian-American game, was to be shown online on ESPN360, then shown the next day on ESPN2, but the rebroadcast on ESPN2 was canceled and replaced by live coverage of the rain-delayed NASCAR 3M Performance 400, and part of the game was shown live on ESPN due to a rain delay in the scheduled St. Louis Cardinals-Chicago Cubs game). ABC was to have its most comprehensive coverage ever, with games on both weekend days in the preliminary rounds, as well as both semifinals and the championship game for a total of five games. ESPN had 15 games scheduled for broadcast, while ESPN2 had 11. A number of games (yet to be announced) were to be shown in high-definition.

The expanded coverage was part of a new eight-year contract between ESPN, Inc. and the Little League organization that started with this series.

No international broadcast plans were available, but possible outlets included ESPN International and TSN (Canada).

Although the Western region champion came from the Phoenix media market, its local affiliate, KNXV, did not show Chandler's first round-robin game on August 18. Instead, ESPN interrupted its normal feed on Cox Communications and other local cable providers to air the game live in that area. KNXV was then to show the game on tape delay at 4:30 p.m. local time. Similarly, the game was also not seen on KTRK-TV in Houston, ironically an owned and operated station. Both KTRK and KNXV instead showed the National Football League preseason game between the Houston Texans and the Arizona Cardinals.

=== Rules change ===
- The 2007 Series was the first to feature a new rule limiting a pitcher to 85 pitches a game and extending rest periods. Little League Baseball hoped that the rule would diminish stress put on pitchers' arms. The rest requirements are as follows:
  - 85 pitches^{1} - Maximum allowed for a single game
  - 61 or more pitches - Three calendar days of rest.
  - 41–60 pitches - Two calendar days of rest.
  - 21–40 pitches - One calendar day of rest.
  - 20 pitches or fewer - No rest required.

^{1} If a pitcher reaches the limit while facing a batter, the pitcher may continue to pitch until that batter reaches base or is out.

== Noteworthy events ==
=== Notable sportsmanship ===
The walk off home run by Dalton Carriker that won Warner Robins the LLWS was followed by the team coming over to embrace and comfort the losing Tokyo team. This event was given considerable press coverage and was considered a breath of fresh air in a summer that saw the spotlight focused on the misdoings of Michael Vick and Barry Bonds.

=== Measles outbreak ===
One of the players on the runner-up Tokyo Kitasuna team was reported to have contracted measles before coming to Williamsport. The player, whose identity was not made public, contracted the virus from a sibling back in Japan in late July and was infectious while traveling. As a result, six people across three states were infected. The boy directly infected four people: a friend from Japan, an airport officer in Detroit, a woman who sat near the boy on the flight from Detroit to Baltimore, and a sales representative in Pennsylvania. The man subsequently infected two Houston-area college students.

=== Coon Rapids handshake incident ===
Two players on the Coon Rapids, Minnesota club reportedly spit on their hands following their elimination from the tournament during pool play. Upon hearing of the incident, which took place as they got ready to shake hands with the victorious Chandler, Arizona, club and was televised throughout the US on ESPN, manager Mark Lowe apologized for the incident.

=== Notable players ===
Cody Bellinger, a member of the 2007 Chandler North Little League team, became the first player from the 2007 LLWS to play in Major League Baseball, when he was called up by the Los Angeles Dodgers in April 2017. He was named National League Rookie of the Year that season and the National League MVP in 2019.

Cooper Hummel, a member of the Lake Oswego team, currently plays on the Houston Astros.

== Champions path ==
The Warner Robins American LL went undefeated on their road to the LLWS, winning all twelve of their games. In total record was 17–1, their only loss coming against Hamilton West Side LL (from Ohio).

Round	Opposition	Result
Georgia State Tournament
Group Stage	(Georgia (U.S. state)) Cedartown LL	10–0
Group Stage	(Georgia (U.S. state)) Decatur Belvedere LL	7–3
Group Stage	(Georgia (U.S. state)) Elbert County LL	17–6
Group Stage	(Georgia (U.S. state)) Toccoa National LL	22–4
Semifinals	(Georgia (U.S. state)) Oconee County American LL	9–2 (4 inn.)
Championship	(Georgia (U.S. state)) Buckhead Piedmont LL	6–3
Southeast Regional
Group Stage	(Alabama) Mobile Westside LL	6–5
Group Stage	(South Carolina) Wren LL	6–0
Group Stage	(Tennessee) Tullahoma American LL	5–1
Semifinals	(Virginia) SYA East LL	3–2
Southeast Region Championship	(Alabama) Mobile Westside LL	10–9
