= Walpole, Massachusetts =

- Town
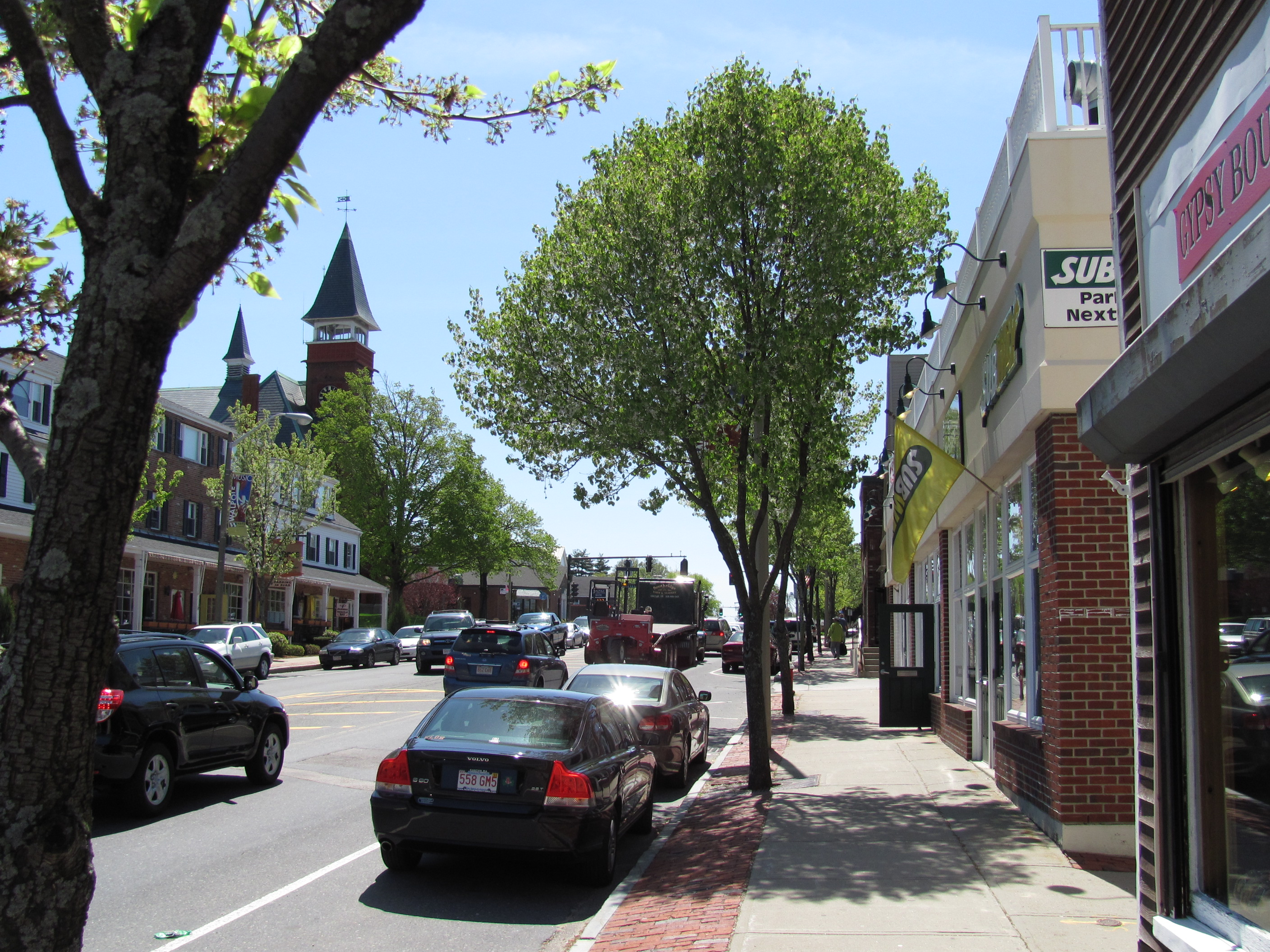
- Main Street

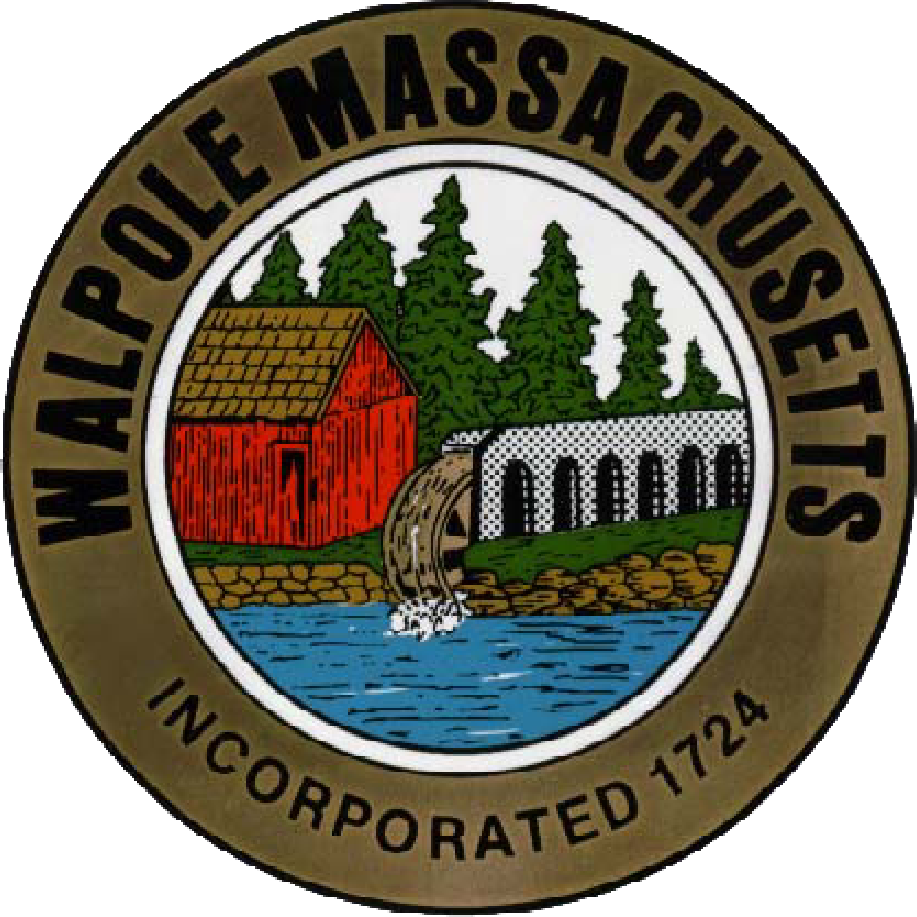
- Seal

- Location in Norfolk County in Massachusetts
- Coordinates: 42°08′30″N 71°15′00″W
- Country: United States
- State: Massachusetts
- County: Norfolk
- Settled: 1659
- Incorporated: 1724
- Named for: Robert Walpole

Government
  - Type: Representative town meeting
  - Town Administrator: Jim Johnson

Area
  - Total: 21.0 sq mi (54.4 km^{2})
  - Land: 20.5 sq mi (53.2 km^{2})
  - Water: 0.46 sq mi (1.2 km^{2})
- Elevation: 151 ft (46 m)

Population (2020)
  - Total: 26,384
  - Density: 1,284/sq mi (495.9/km^{2})
- Time zone: UTC−5 (Eastern)
  - Summer (DST): UTC−4 (Eastern)
- ZIP Codes: 02081 (Walpole); 02032 (East Walpole); 02071 (South Walpole)
- Area code: 508 / 774
- FIPS code: 25-72495
- GNIS feature ID: 0618331
- Website: www.walpole-ma.gov

Walpole is a town in Norfolk County, Massachusetts, United States. Walpole Town, as the Census refers to it, is located approximately 18 miles (29 km) south of downtown Boston, Massachusetts, and 30 miles (48 km) north of Providence, Rhode Island. The population of Walpole was 26,383 at the 2020 census. Walpole was first settled in 1659 and was considered a part of Dedham until officially incorporated in 1724. The town was named after Sir Robert Walpole, de facto first prime minister of Great Britain. It also encompasses the entirely distinct entity of Walpole (CDP), with its much smaller area of 2.9 square miles.

== History ==
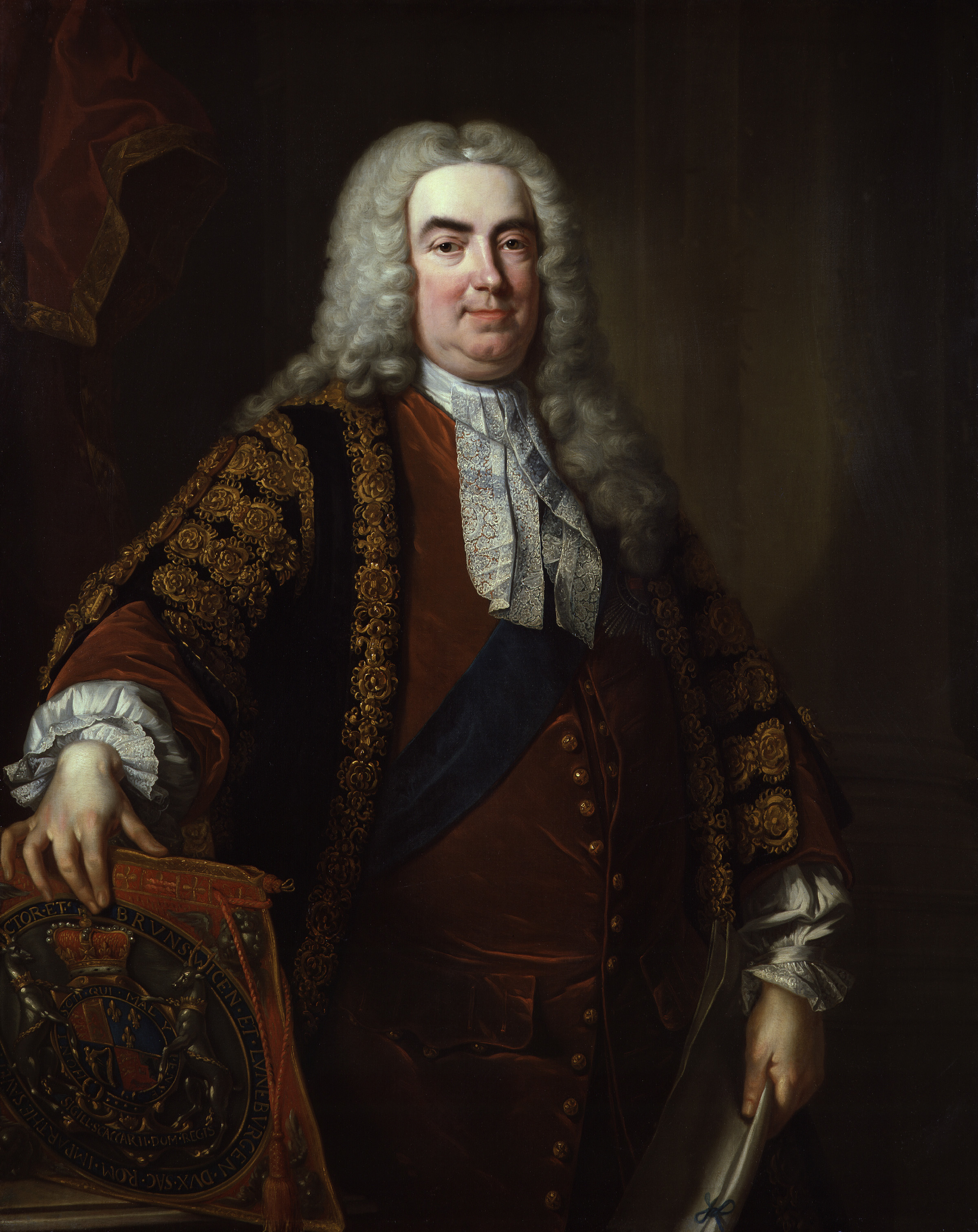
Sir Robert Walpole, the town's namesake

It started out as a territory that was claimed by the Neponset band of the Massachusett Native American tribe. The Neponset tribe officially claimed the area that is now Walpole, and some of its surrounding territory, in 1635. The town of Dedham was not included in this claim, so they began to negotiate with the Neponset tribe to gain land. In 1636, a deal was made between the town of Dedham and the Neponsets to grant Dedham lands that now comprise the towns of Walpole, Norwood, Westwood, Medfield, Norfolk and Dover as well as Dedham. The land given to Dedham in this deal currently includes parts of 16 different towns.

After the territory was bought from Dedham, the saw mill industry began to rise in the area. The first saw mill in Walpole was built near what is now School Meadow Brook and the Neponset River. It was located in the area that is now the Walpole Town Forest. The mill was built and later owned by Joshua Fisher and Major Eleazer Lusher, two wealthy men of Dedham.

On May 13, 1717, Dedham's Town Meeting voted to allow those in outlying areas to stop paying for the central village's minister and to move the school around town seasonally. When residents of the sawmill village asked to establish their own church, however, the Town voted not to allow it on March 7, 1721. Two months later, on May 15, 1721, the same residents presented a petition asking to be set off as their own town. Town Meeting once again rejected their request.

Soon residents of the other outlying areas began joining forces with them. Finally, with the urging of the Great and General Court, the new town of Walpole was created in May 1724. The town was named after Sir Robert Walpole.

After its incorporation, Walpole had a role in the events leading up to the American Revolutionary War. The citizens opposed taxes imposed by the British government. They sent a representative, Joshua Clapp, to the state meetings at Faneuil Hall in Boston. These meetings were to discuss how Massachusetts was going to keep its residents safe and peaceful during the events of the American Revolutionary War. In 1775, Walpole sent 157 men to the Battle of Lexington and Concord. These men were led by Captain Seth Bullard. In December 1777, a British fleet of ships came into Narragansett Bay and anchored in Newport Harbor in Rhode Island. Walpole sent two groups of minutemen, consisting of 65 men in total, to help with the situation. These men were led by Joshua Clapp, and Oliver Clapp. They stayed in Rhode Island to defend the port for three weeks.

Walpole began to grow after the Revolutionary War. By 1860, the town had 1,935 residents. Starting around this time, several mills began to be built, largely on the Neponset River in order to harness the power of falls. Over the years, these mills grew and mainly manufactured products such as cotton, lumber, and paper in its many mills. The most notable of these was the Bird Company, which comprised a large complex on the river in East Walpole. After the company ceased operations at the site in 1980, most of the buildings were razed over the years; a housing development now occupies a large portion of the old mill site and only a few remnants of the area's former use are still evident. The Neponset River was also used for transport between the close towns of Sharon, Foxborough and Medfield. It was also used as a water supply and for water power. The Norfolk County railroad also connected the town. It was also part of a railroad network that connected Walpole to Boston and New York City. Many churches were formed in Walpole at this time, including Trinitarian, Unitarian and Methodist ones: Union Congregational Church est. 1877, etc.

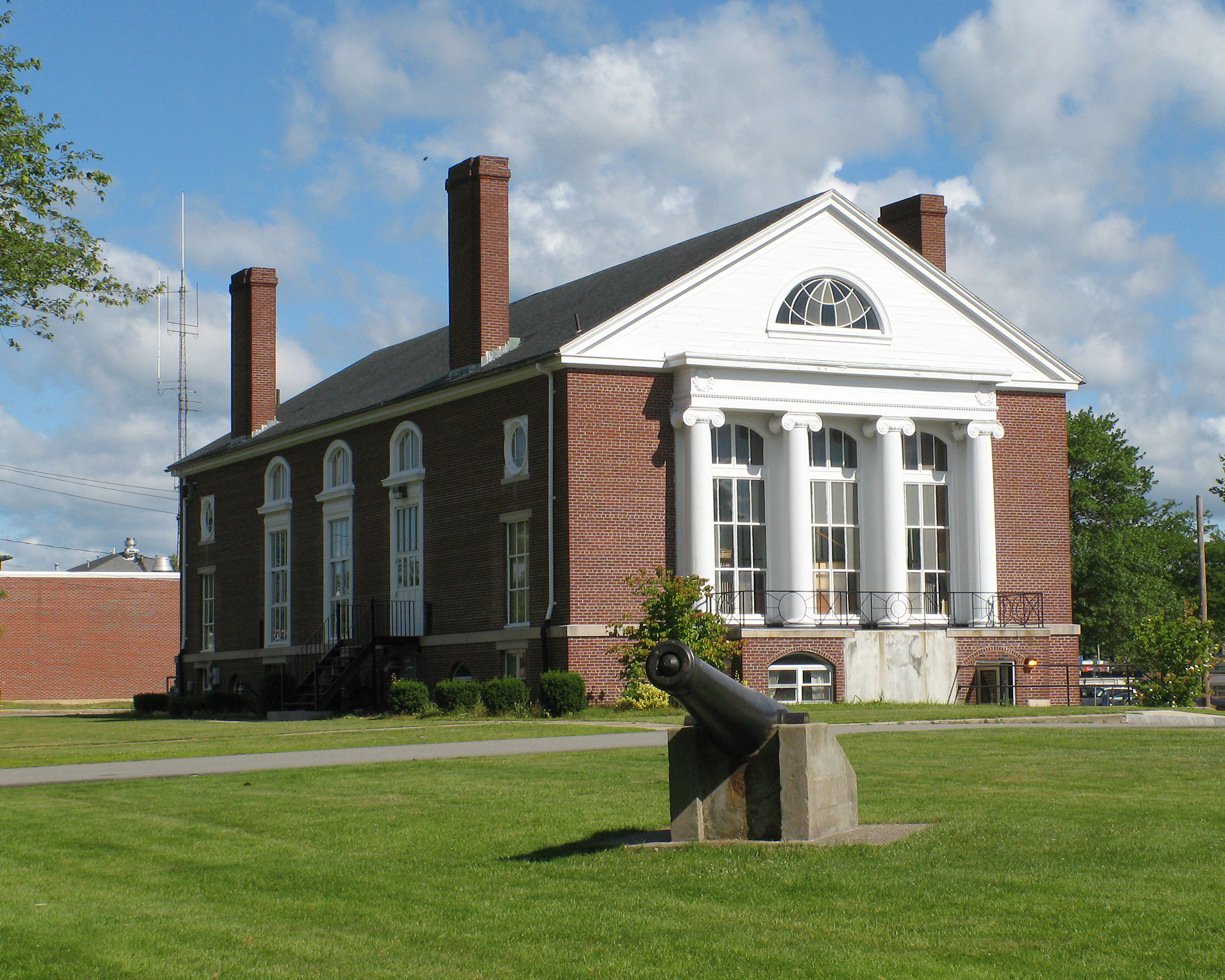
Blackburn Hall in Walpole was built by Harriet Nevins as a memorial to her parents.

Walpole's first public library was founded in 1872. It was founded by Walpole resident Miss Mary R. Bird. The first library in Walpole was actually founded in 1816 by a group known as "The Ladies' Literary, Moral Society". It was not public, and was built to provide books to Walpole that may, in the words of the society, "afford useful information to the mind and improvement to the heart."

The town grew considerably throughout the 1900s, with an increase of over 3,000 by the 1920s. At a town meeting in 1922, local resident Maude R. Greeves said:

Upon the town seal of Walpole is depicted an old watermill, presumably the old saw mill of Eleazer Lusher and Joshua Fisher on the Neponset River, with a forest of trees in the background, and in the margin are the words, 'Walpole, Mass., incorporated 1724.' Quite a change has come to the town since the conditions represented by the Corporate Seal existed. Walpole of the present day is one of the thriving towns of the Old Bay State with a population of 5,446.

The town seal was adopted by a committee of the Walpole Board of Selectmen on March 2, 1914. The seal was designed by Edna Buck, a junior at Walpole High School. Her prize for having her design selected was $25. She based the design on the ruins of a saw mill located on Brook Street at the time.

In 1929, Harriet Nevins donated $50,000 for the erection of a public building as a memorial for her parents, George Blackburn and Nancy H. Blackburn. Her father, a merchant from Bradford, England, had once lived and done business in Walpole. Blackburn Memorial Building (more commonly known as "Blackburn Hall") was designed by the architectural firm of Putnam & Cox Company of Boston, built by the F.J. Tetreault Company of Walpole, and dedicated in 1932. The red brick building, which features a neo-classical façade with whitewashed pillars, is still owned by the Town of Walpole and is used for a variety of activities throughout the year, including children's theater production. "To the Families of Boston and Eastern Massachusetts", Nevins also left $2500 to fund the construction of a fountain for horses and dogs. The fountain is now dry, but still stands on School Street in Walpole opposite the Town Hall.

== Census-designated place ==
Walpole is a small census-designated place (CDP) located within the much larger town of Walpole in Norfolk County, Massachusetts, United States. The population of the CDP was 5,918 at the 2010 census.

=== Geography ===
Walpole is located at 42°8′25″N 71°14′47″W (42.140417, -71.246421).

According to the United States Census Bureau, the CDP has a total area of 7.5 km^{2} (2.9 mi^{2}), of which 7.4 km^{2} (2.9 mi^{2}) is land and 0.2 km^{2} (0.1 mi^{2}) (2.06%) is water.

=== Demographics ===
At the census of 2010, there were 24,070 people, 8,060 households, and 5,972 families residing in the town. The population

Historical population
Year	Pop.	±%
1790	1,005	—
1850	1,929	+91.9%
1860	2,037	+5.6%
1870	2,137	+4.9%
1880	2,494	+16.7%
1890	2,604	+4.4%
1900	3,572	+37.2%
1910	4,892	+37.0%
1920	5,446	+11.3%
1930	7,273	+33.5%
1940	7,443	+2.3%
1950	9,109	+22.4%
1960	14,068	+54.4%
1970	18,149	+29.0%
1980	18,859	+3.9%
1990	20,212	+7.2%
2000	22,824	+12.9%
2010	24,070	+5.5%
2020	26,383	+9.6%
2024*	26,391	+0.0%
* = population estimate. Source: United States census records and Population Estimates Program data.

density was 429.0/km^{2} (1077.3/sq mi). There were 8,229 housing units at an average density of 400.7 per square mile (154.7/km^{2}). The racial makeup of the town was 95.41% White, 1.59% Black or African American, 0.11% Native American, 1.13% Asian, 0.01% Pacific Islander, 1.12% from other races, and 0.64% from two or more races. Hispanic or Latino people of any race were 2.02% of the population.

There were 8730 households, out of which 35.4% had children under the age of 18 living with them, 63.2% were married couples living together, 8.4% had a female householder with no husband present, and 25.9% were non-families. 22.5% of all households were made up of individuals, and 11.5% had someone living alone who was 65 years of age or older. The average household size was 2.72 and the average family size was 3.23.

In the town, the population was spread out, with 25.8% under the age of 18, 5.2% from 18 to 24, 30.6% from 25 to 44, 23.9% from 45 to 64, and 14.4% who were 65 years of age or older. The median age was 39 years. For every 100 females, there were 100.0 males. For every 100 females age 18 and over, there were 98.5 males.

The median income for a household in the town was $74,757, and the median income for a family was $84,458. Males had a median income of $54,243 versus $39,516 for females. The per capita income for the town was $32,117. About 1.5% of families and 2.2% of the population were below the poverty line, including 1.8% of those under age 18 and 4.7% of those age 65 or over.

== Weather and climate ==
Under the Köppen climate classification, Walpole has a humid continental climate (Dfa), which is the predominant climate for Massachusetts and New England. Walpole's inland location causes it to experience cooler winter temperatures than many coastal locations in New England. Summers are typically hot and humid, while winters are cold, windy, and often snowy.

Walpole's warmest month is July, with an average high temperature of 83.4 °F (28.6 °C) and an average low of 63.3 °F (17.4 °C). The coldest month is January, with an average high temperature of 36.8 °F (2.7 °C) and an average low of 19.7 °F (−6.8 °C).

Much like the rest of the Northeastern seaboard, Walpole receives ample amounts of precipitation year-round. On average, summer months receive slightly less precipitation than winter months. Walpole averages 49.59 in (1,260 mm) of rainfall a year. Walpole, like other Massachusetts towns, is very vulnerable to Nor'easter weather systems. The town is sometimes vulnerable to Atlantic hurricanes and tropical storms, which infrequently threaten the New England region during the early autumn months.

Climate data for Walpole, Massachusetts, 1991–2020 normals, extremes 1948–present
Month	Jan	Feb	Mar	Apr	May	Jun	Jul	Aug	Sep	Oct	Nov	Dec	Year
Record high °F (°C)	71 (22)	72 (22)	90 (32)	96 (36)	96 (36)	101 (38)	102 (39)	102 (39)	100 (38)	88 (31)	82 (28)	76 (24)	102 (39)
Mean maximum °F (°C)	57.5 (14.2)	58.5 (14.7)	68.4 (20.2)	81.0 (27.2)	88.9 (31.6)	91.8 (33.2)	94.2 (34.6)	92.4 (33.6)	88.2 (31.2)	78.8 (26.0)	69.6 (20.9)	61.1 (16.2)	95.9 (35.5)
Mean daily maximum °F (°C)	36.8 (2.7)	39.6 (4.2)	47.4 (8.6)	59.4 (15.2)	69.9 (21.1)	77.9 (25.5)	83.4 (28.6)	81.7 (27.6)	74.1 (23.4)	62.5 (16.9)	51.4 (10.8)	41.6 (5.3)	60.5 (15.8)
Daily mean °F (°C)	28.2 (−2.1)	30.4 (−0.9)	37.7 (3.2)	48.5 (9.2)	58.8 (14.9)	67.6 (19.8)	73.4 (23.0)	71.8 (22.1)	64.3 (17.9)	52.6 (11.4)	42.5 (5.8)	33.5 (0.8)	50.8 (10.4)
Mean daily minimum °F (°C)	19.7 (−6.8)	21.1 (−6.1)	27.9 (−2.3)	37.6 (3.1)	47.7 (8.7)	57.2 (14.0)	63.3 (17.4)	61.8 (16.6)	54.4 (12.4)	42.8 (6.0)	33.6 (0.9)	25.4 (−3.7)	41.0 (5.0)
Mean minimum °F (°C)	−0.5 (−18.1)	2.3 (−16.5)	9.8 (−12.3)	25.0 (−3.9)	33.3 (0.7)	43.3 (6.3)	52.2 (11.2)	49.8 (9.9)	37.5 (3.1)	26.9 (−2.8)	17.5 (−8.1)	7.5 (−13.6)	−3.0 (−19.4)
Record low °F (°C)	−19 (−28)	−19 (−28)	−13 (−25)	10 (−12)	22 (−6)	33 (1)	39 (4)	32 (0)	26 (−3)	15 (−9)	4 (−16)	−14 (−26)	−19 (−28)
Average precipitation inches (mm)	3.94 (100)	3.36 (85)	4.77 (121)	4.43 (113)	3.59 (91)	4.25 (108)	3.58 (91)	3.95 (100)	3.71 (94)	4.97 (126)	4.08 (104)	4.96 (126)	49.59 (1,259)
Average snowfall inches (cm)	15.1 (38)	14.1 (36)	11.6 (29)	2.5 (6.4)	0.0 (0.0)	0.0 (0.0)	0.0 (0.0)	0.0 (0.0)	0.0 (0.0)	0.3 (0.76)	1.7 (4.3)	10.8 (27)	56.1 (141.46)
Average extreme snow depth inches (cm)	9.8 (25)	10.8 (27)	9.9 (25)	2.0 (5.1)	0.0 (0.0)	0.0 (0.0)	0.0 (0.0)	0.0 (0.0)	0.0 (0.0)	0.2 (0.51)	1.3 (3.3)	7.1 (18)	17.0 (43)
Average precipitation days (≥ 0.01 in)	11.8	10.1	11.8	12.3	12.4	11.1	10.4	9.6	9.1	11.0	10.5	11.5	131.6
Average snowy days (≥ 0.1 in)	7.3	6.5	5.1	1.1	0.0	0.0	0.0	0.0	0.0	0.3	1.2	4.7	26.2
Source 1: NOAA
Source 2: National Weather Service

== Education ==
Walpole High School, Walpole's only public high school

Walpole's school system, the Walpole Public Schools, is run by a school committee made up of seven members. The committee appoints a superintendent, who then appoints individual principals in each of Walpole's public schools. The current school superintendent is Bridget Gough. Walpole has six public schools, which include four elementary schools, one middle school, and one high school.

The four elementary schools in Walpole include Old Post Road School, Elm Street School, Boyden School, and Fisher School. Old Post Road school is located in East Walpole. It has about 500 students attending and serves students in from kindergarten through grade five. Currently, there are three modular classrooms for the fourth grade to accommodate the growing student population. Fisher School was the first to be established, on North Street, in 1790. It was a one-room schoolhouse until 1914, when a modern building was built on Main Street. In 2007, the school was attended by about 470 students. Boyden Elementary School was founded in 1854 by Jeremiah Boyden. It was first named South Primary School until 1902, when the town decided to name it after Boyden. It was closed between 1981 and 1988 and was used as a school for troubled boys. It reopened in 1990 and in 2010 had about 460 students and 30 teachers. Elm Street school is one Walpole's newer schools, which was opened in 1999, and renovated in 2004. It has about 520 students. Walpole Middle School is Walpole's newest school and has been substantially completed in 2024. The middle school combined the former Bird Middle School and former Johnson Middle School into one unified middle school.

- There is one middle school in Walpole, Walpole Middle School.
- The Blessed Sacrament is a private Catholic School in Walpole.
- Shishu Bharati School of Languages and Culture of India, a private, non-profit institution, has a branch in Walpole.
- The town is also home to the Norfolk County Agricultural High School and the Longview Farm School.

== Law and government ==
Walpole, like most New England towns, has a select board style of government. The town has a five-member selectboard. The current members, Mark Gallivan, Benjamin Barrett, James O'Neil, Glenn Maffei, and Allyson Hamilton, were each elected to three-year terms. It also uses a representative town meeting, with about 150 representatives. Walpole is divided into eight precincts, and each precinct elects 18–20 representatives to the town meeting. Representatives serve a three-year term.

The town also elects a moderator, and members to the board of assessors, housing authority, library board of trustees, planning board, school committee, and sewer and water commission.

Jake Auchincloss and Stephen Lynch represent different areas of the town in the United States House of Representatives, and Elizabeth Warren and Edward Markey represent Walpole in the United States Senate.

The town leans towards Democrats, but has sometimes voted for Republican presidential candidates for President. Notably, the town voted for the nationwide loser in every election from 2000 to 2016. The last time the town voted for a Republican candidate for president was in 2012, when the town voted for Mitt Romney, the former Governor of Massachusetts, by nearly 8 percentage points.

== State prison closure ==
It is only partially accurate to say that Walpole is the location of Massachusetts Correctional Institution – Cedar Junction, a maximum security prison for males that was originally named "MCI—Walpole" until town residents successfully lobbied in the mid-1980s for the change. In reality, only part of the facility actually lies in Walpole. The southwest part of it lies in the neighboring town of Norfolk, but as Norfolk already has a prison (MCI Norfolk), Cedar Junction was originally known as MCI Walpole.

As of April 2022, Cedar Junction was planned to be shut down within the next two years due to reduced incarceration rates (currently the lowest in 35 years) and the high costs of maintenance.

== Recreation ==
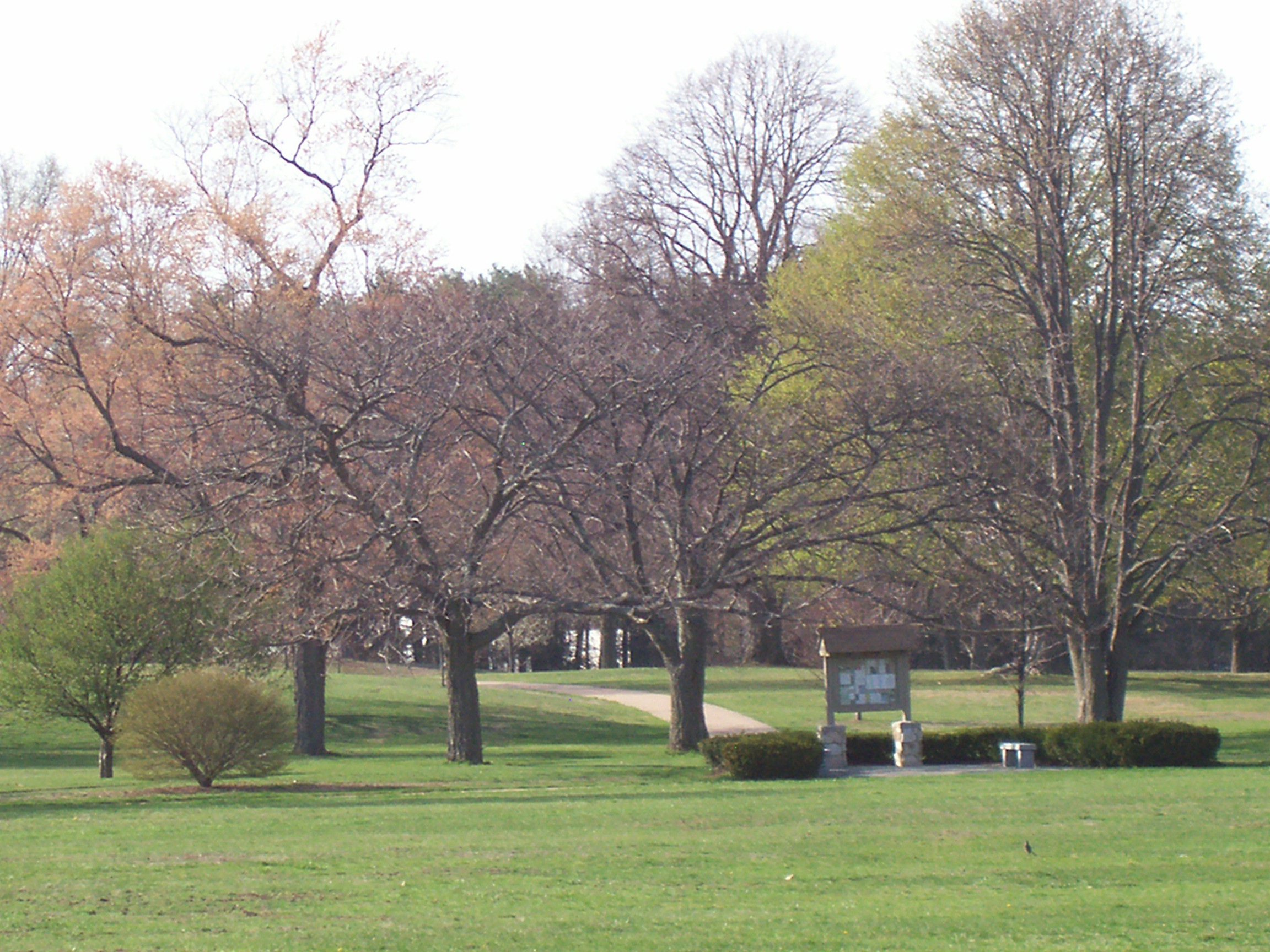
Francis William Bird Park, located in East Walpole

Francis William Bird Park is an 89-acre (360,000 m^{2}) landscaped park, owned and maintained by The Trustees of Reservations. Over three miles (5 km) of walking and biking paths wind through the park, traversing streams across old granite bridges and passing through rolling, grassy meadows punctuated with mature shade trees, tree groves, and ponds.

Facilities at the park include bike racks, public restroom (open seasonally), a "tot lot" with children's play equipment, four tennis courts, a basketball backboard, and an outdoor stage.

Bird Park was created and endowed in 1925 by local industrialist Charles Sumner Bird, Sr. and his wife Anna in memory of their eldest son, Francis William Bird who had died seven years earlier in the influenza epidemic of 1918. Landscape architect and town planner John Nolen designed the park. A social reformer, Nolen believed that parks were critical to the health of urban residents and should be designed to provide a place of respite and relaxation in nature. In his original design plan, Nolen wrote that this park should be:

...a sequestered breathing place in the heart of East Walpole...a combination of broad, sun-swept meadow lands, speckled with shadowed glades, higher tree-screened knolls for the lover of shade, the whole set to the music of a babbling stream.

For most of its history, the park was owned and maintained by the Francis William Park Trust. By the later decades of the 20th century, parts of the park suffered badly from vandalism and neglect. The Trustees of Reservations gained possession of this property in 2002. Today the park is in excellent condition and several young ornamental trees such as cherry and Japanese maple have been added to the landscape, as have flower beds.

On the Walpole-Norfolk town line, a new park opened in the 2020s. This park includes a playground and fields for football, soccer, and lacrosse.

== Sports ==
=== Walpole High School athletics ===
- The Walpole High School football team has made USA Today's Top 25 list twice, in 1986 (#24), and 1989 (#15).
- The Walpole High School boys' lacrosse team won the 2009 Division 2 State Championship.
- In 2004, the Walpole boys' and girls' high school basketball teams captured the Massachusetts State Titles on the same day in the Fleet Center in Boston.
- The boys' cross country team won Massachusetts Sectional Championships in 1971, 1985, 1986, 1991, 1992, 2014, 2018, and 2023.
- The boys' hockey team won the MIAA single-division state championship in 1945, 1953, 1963, and 1965. The team made the Massachusetts High School Super 8 for the first time in school history in 2017. Then won the Division 1 state championship in 2020 being named Co-State Champions with Belmont High School.

=== Timberwolves and Porkers ===
All Walpole High School teams are nicknamed Timberwolves, except for the girls' field hockey team, which is nicknamed Porkers. In 2023, the Porkers won their 13th state championship in a 1–0 win over Andover. This win set the record for the number of overall championship titles for Massachusetts field hockey. The team also won the state championship in 2024 and 2025. After their win in 2025, the Walpole Police Department escorted the team's bus back into the town to congratulate them on their win against Franklin 1-0 at Burlington High School. Senior Emily Hagan helped the team get that single point with the help of Senior Kendal Cusack. Both seniors have continued to play in Division 1 College Sports. Hagan attends Temple University and Cusack attends Virginia Commonwealth University.

=== Youth sports ===
- Walpole Little League has won the state championship three times : 1991, 2007, and 2019. They went to the Little League World Series in 2007 with a record of 19–1. They defeated Shelton, CT 14–4 in five inning mercy rule to advance to the LLWS. In round robin play, Walpole was eliminated with a 1–2 record, after losing to Oregon and Georgia, 1–0 and 8–1 respectively, and finished 21–3.
- There are youth sports leagues in Walpole providing youth athletes with a number of options throughout the year, many of which are run through the Walpole Recreation Department and their affiliates.
- The Walpole Express is a junior, youth, and girls' hockey organization based in Walpole.

== Controversy ==
From the 1960s until the 2000s, Walpole high school teams were called the Rebels. For many years, up until 1994, the song "Dixie" was commonly sung at football games, and even incorporated into the cheerleaders' cheers. During the height of the Confederate identity, the football coach, Coach Lee, was known as General Lee, and, in 1971, the face of the school yearbook was decorated with the confederate flag. Since 1994, the school has condemned the Confederate identity.

In June 2020, following the murder of George Floyd in Minnesota, which brought light to the national problem of racism and police brutality, Walpole residents started a petition to change the athletic team name due to its connection to the Confederacy and racist roots. Other Walpole residents started a petition to keep the name. The two petitions got over 5,000 signatures each, from current students, alumni, parents, residents, and residents of surrounding towns. The petitions were made to the Walpole Public Schools. In August 2020, the school committee unanimously voted to drop the name Rebels. The students voted on the new name, Timberwolves.

== Media ==
Walpole Community Television, established in 1984, airs programming of local interest to all Walpole cable subscribers.

== Transportation and geography ==
Walpole is bordered by Dover to the north; Westwood, Canton, and Norwood to the northeast; Sharon to the east; Foxboro to the south; and Norfolk and Medfield to the west.

Walpole is served by Walpole station on the MBTA Commuter Rail Franklin/Foxboro Line. (Plimptonville station, located in northern Walpole, was closed in 2020.) MBTA bus route 34E terminates in downtown Walpole.

== Notable people ==
- Andrew Bacevich, professor of international relations at Boston University, former director of its Center for International Relations (from 1998 to 2005), and author of several books
- Todd Collins, professional American football quarterback
- Mary Duffy, Eaton Vance executive
- Gene Lavanchy, TV news anchor for FOX channel 25 in Boston
- Mary Lavin, short story writer; born in Walpole, moved to Ireland at age 10
- Mike Milbury, former Boston Bruins ice hockey defenseman and head coach
- Joe Morgan, professional baseball manager for a variety of teams including the Boston Red Sox
- George Arthur Plimpton (1855–1936), publisher and philanthropist
- Cam Schlittler, professional baseball player for the New York Yankees
- Butch Songin, quarterback for the Boston College Eagles, the Hamilton Tiger-Cats of the Canadian Rugby Union, and the American Football League's Boston Patriots and New York Titans; All-American defenseman for the BC Eagles ice hockey team
- Roger Turner, Olympic Figure Skater
- Chris Wagner, ice hockey player for the Boston Bruins, previously played for the Anaheim Ducks, New York Islanders and Colorado Avalanche
- Joseph N. Welch, special counsel to the United States Army during the Army–McCarthy Hearings; later played Judge Weaver in Anatomy of a Murder with Jimmy Stewart and Lee Remick

== Gallery ==
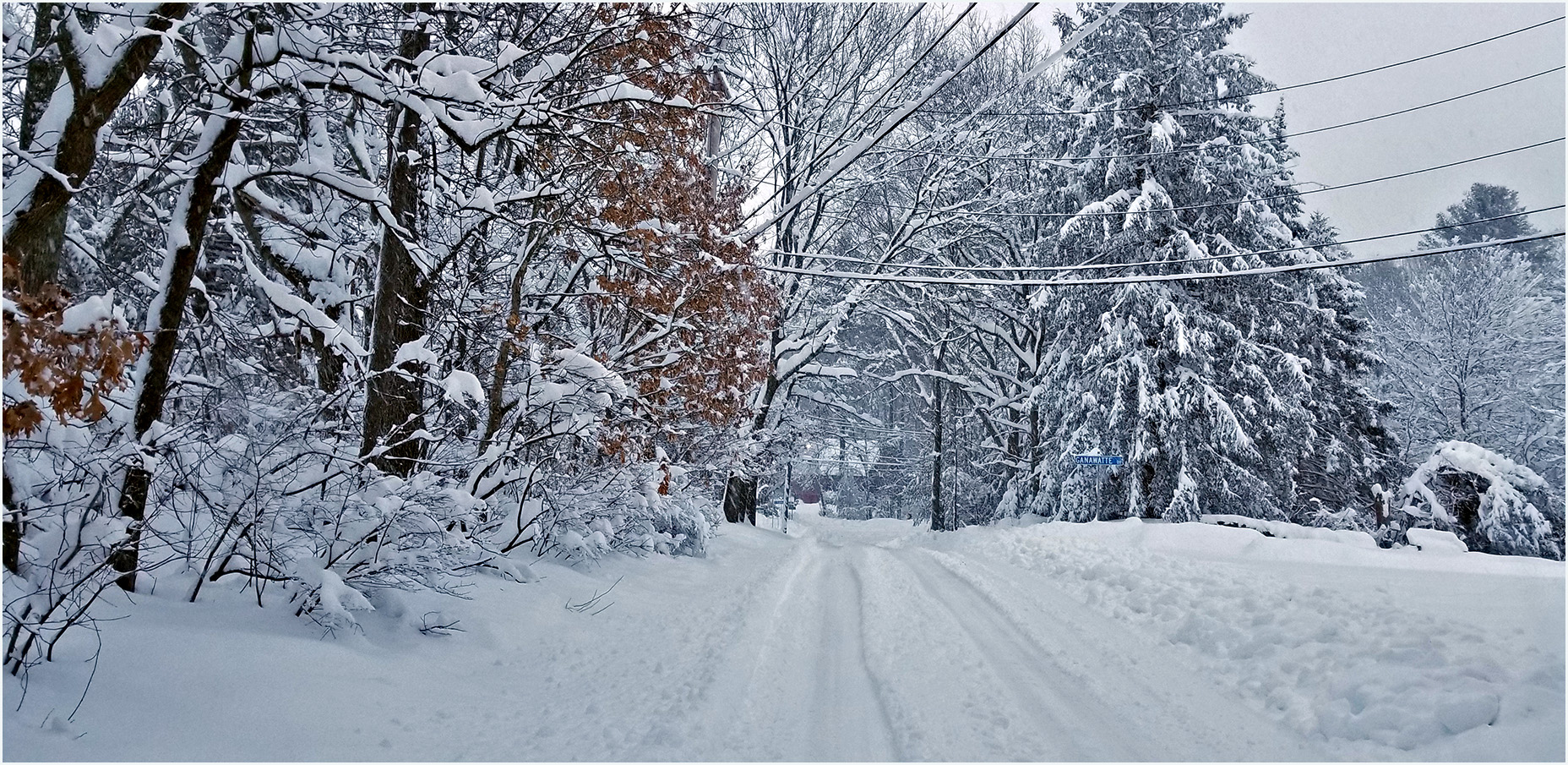
Pine Street, March 2019 winter storm

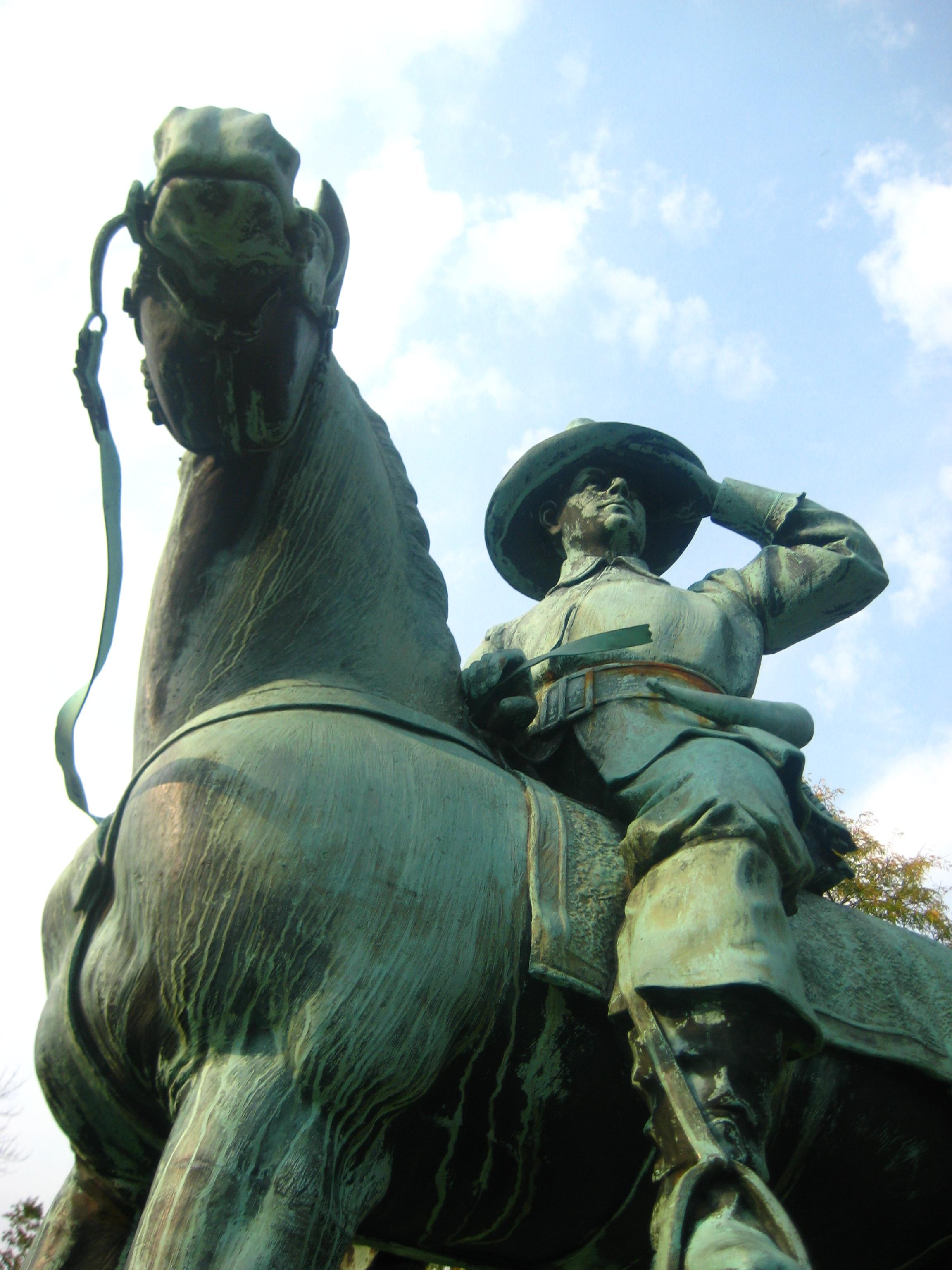
Located on East Street near Route 27 in Walpole, this equestrian statue depicts Lieutenant Lewis, an officer in Queen Anne's War and ancestor of the prominent local family whose former home is now maintained by the Walpole Historical Society.

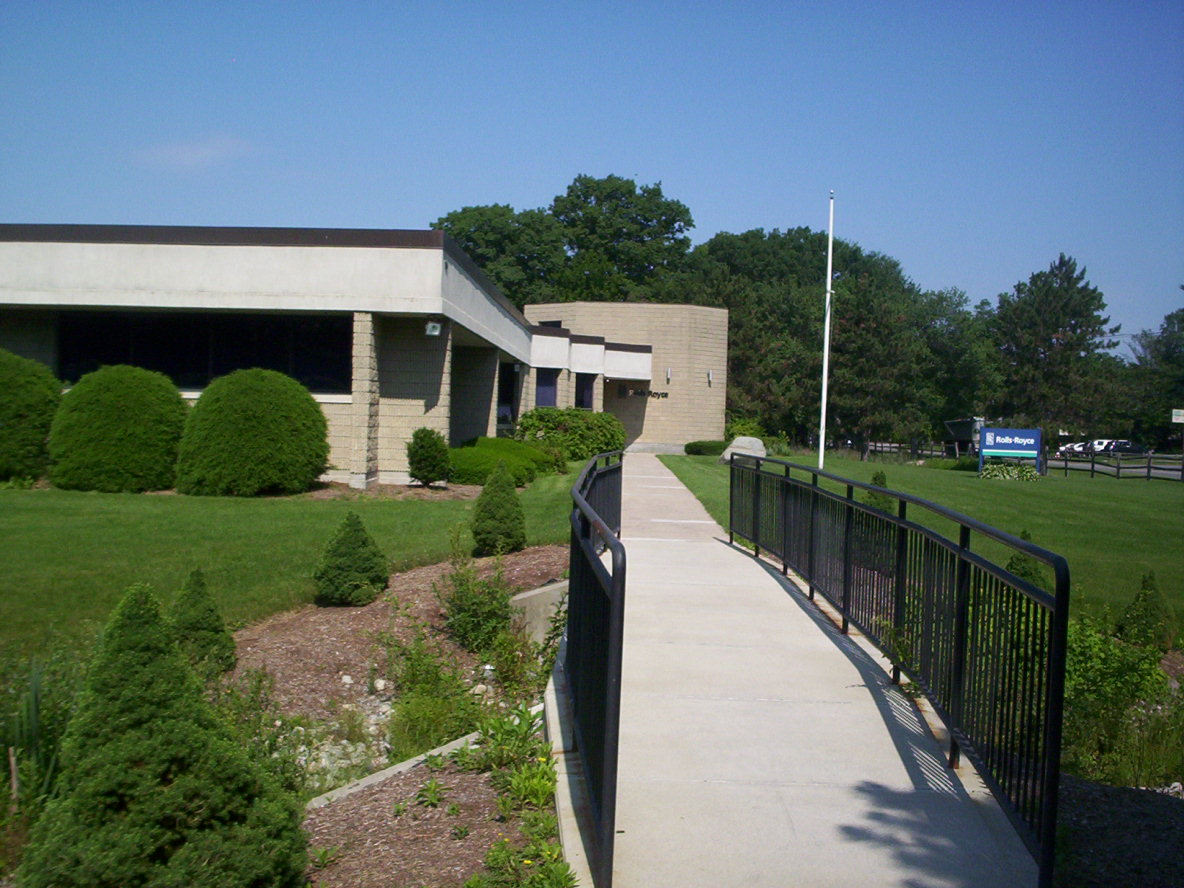
Rolls-Royce in Walpole

== See also ==
- MCI—Cedar Junction
- 2007 Little League World Series

== Works cited ==
- Hanson, Robert Brand (1976). Dedham, Massachusetts, 1635–1890. Dedham Historical Society.
