= 2012 Little League World Series qualification =

Children's baseball competition qualification

United States
- Great Lakes winner: New Castle, Indiana
- Mid-Atlantic winner: Parsippany, New Jersey
- Midwest winner: Kearney, Nebraska
- New England winner: Fairfield, Connecticut
- Northwest winner: Gresham, Oregon
- Southeast winner: Goodlettsville, Tennessee
- Southwest winner: San Antonio, Texas
- West winner: Petaluma, California

International
- Asia-Pacific winner: Taoyuan, Chinese Taipei
- Canada winner: (Canada) Vancouver, British Columbia
- Caribbean winner: Willemstad, Curaçao
- Europe winner: Ramstein, Germany
- Japan winner: (Japan) Tokyo
- Latin America winner: Aguadulce, Panama
- Mexico winner: (Mexico) Nuevo Laredo, Tamaulipas
- Middle East-Africa winner: Lugazi, Uganda

Tournaments

Qualification for the 2012 Little League World Series took place in eight United States regions and eight international regions from June through August 2012.

== United States ==
=== Great Lakes ===
The tournament took place in Indianapolis on August 3–10.

Note: Michigan fell to fifth place based on a tiebreaker of runs scored against divided by innings played.

State	City	LL Organization	Record
Wisconsin	Eau Claire	Eau Claire National	3–1
Kentucky	Bowling Green	Warren County Southern	2–2
Illinois	Streator	Streator	2–2
Indiana	New Castle	New Castle	2–2
Michigan	Saginaw	North Saginaw Township	2–2
Ohio	Hamilton	West Side	1–3

Semi-finals
August 8 – Indianapolis
4 Indiana	2
1 Wisconsin	1
August 8 – Indianapolis
3 Illinois	3
2 Kentucky	4

Final
August 10 – Indianapolis
4 Indiana	6
2 Kentucky	5

=== Mid-Atlantic ===
The tournament took place in Bristol, Connecticut on August 3–12.

State	City	LL Organization	Record
Delaware	Newark	Newark National	3–1
New Jersey	Parsippany	Par Troy East	3–1
Pennsylvania	Collier	Collier Township Athletic Association	2–2
Maryland	Salisbury	West Salisbury	2–2
New York	Stony Point	Stony Point	1–3
Washington, D.C.		Northwest Washington	1–3

Semi-finals
August 10 – Bristol
4 Maryland	0
1 Delaware	6
August 10 – Bristol
3 Pennsylvania	4
2 New Jersey	9

Final
August 12 – Bristol
1 Delaware	0
2 New Jersey	1

=== Midwest ===
The tournament took place in Indianapolis on August 4–11.

Note: The Dakotas are organized into a single Little League district.

State	City	LL Organization	Record
Nebraska	Kearney	Kearney	4–0
South Dakota	Rapid City	Canyon Lake	3–1
Minnesota	Robbinsdale	Robbinsdale	3–1
Missouri	De Soto	De Soto	1–3
Iowa	Sioux City	Sioux City Westside	1–3
Kansas	Girard	Girard	0–4

Semi-finals
August 9 – Indianapolis
4 Missouri	3
1 Nebraska	5
August 9 – Indianapolis
3 Minnesota	1
2 South Dakota	6

Final
August 11 – Indianapolis
1 Nebraska	10
2 South Dakota	4

=== New England ===
The tournament took place in Bristol, Connecticut on August 3–11.

State	City	LL Organization	Record
Connecticut	Fairfield	Fairfield American	4–0
Massachusetts	Wellesley	Wellesley South	2–2
New Hampshire	Bedford	Bedford	2–2
Vermont	South Burlington	South Burlington	2–2
Rhode Island	Coventry	Coventry American	1–3
Maine	Scarborough	Scarborough	1–3

Semi-finals
August 9 – Bristol (F/8)
4 Vermont	3
1 Connecticut	4
August 9 – Bristol
3 New Hampshire	2
2 Massachusetts	0

Final
August 11 – Bristol
1 Connecticut	14
3 New Hampshire	0

=== Northwest ===
The tournament took place in San Bernardino, California on August 3–11.

State	City	LL Organization	Record
Washington	Mercer Island	Mercer Island	4–0
Idaho	Post Falls	Post Falls	3–1
Montana	Billings	Boulder Arrowhead	2–2
Oregon	Gresham	Gresham National	2–2
Alaska	Juneau	Gastineau Channel	1–3
Wyoming	Cody	Cody	0–4

Semi-finals
August 9 – San Bernardino
4 Oregon	6
1 Washington	2
August 9 – San Bernardino
3 Montana	2
2 Idaho	3

Final
August 11 – San Bernardino
4 Oregon	8
2 Idaho	4

=== Southeast ===
The tournament took place in Warner Robins, Georgia on August 3–10.

Pool A
State	City	LL Organization	Record
Virginia	Great Falls	Great Falls	3–0
Tennessee	Goodlettsville	Goodlettsville Baseball	2–1
South Carolina	Irmo	Irmo	1–2
West Virginia	Shinnston	Shinnston	0–3

Pool B
State	City	LL Organization	Record
North Carolina	Greenville	Tar Heel	2–1
Georgia	Warner Robins	Warner Robins American West	2–1
Florida	Plant City	Plant City	1–2
Alabama	Auburn	Beehive	1–2

Semi-finals
August 8 – Warner Robins
2B Georgia	5
1A Virginia	1
August 8 – Warner Robins
1B North Carolina	3
2A Tennessee	9

Final
August 10 – Warner Robins
2B Georgia	0
2A Tennessee	1

=== Southwest ===
The tournament took place in Waco, Texas on August 3–9.

Pool A
State	City	LL Organization	Record
Louisiana	Lake Charles	South Lake Charles	3–0
New Mexico	Albuquerque	Petroglyph	2–1
Mississippi	D'Iberville	D'Iberville	1–2
Arkansas	White Hall	White Hall	0–3

Pool B
State	City	LL Organization	Record
Texas West	San Antonio	McAllister Park National	3–0
Texas East	Lufkin	Lufkin	2–1
Colorado	Grand Junction	Monument	1–2
Oklahoma	Fairland	Northeast Oklahoma	0–3

Semi-finals
August 7 – Waco
2B Texas East	6
1A Louisiana	0
August 7 – Waco
2A New Mexico	0
1B Texas West	4

Final
August 9 – Waco
2B Texas East	0
1B Texas West	9

=== West ===
The tournament took place in San Bernardino, California on August 3–11.

State	City	LL Organization	Record
Northern California	Petaluma	Petaluma National	4–0
Arizona	Tucson	Rincon	3–1
Hawaii	Waianae	Nānākuli	2–2
Nevada	North Las Vegas	Cheyenne	2–2
Southern California	Orange	Orange	1–3
Utah	Cedar City	Cedar National	0–4

Semi-finals
August 10 – San Bernardino
4 Nevada	4
1 Northern California	10
August 10 – San Bernardino
3 Hawaii	6
2 Arizona	5

Final
August 11 – San Bernardino
1 Northern California	7
3 Hawaii	5

== International ==
=== Asia-Pacific ===
The tournament took place in Taichung, Taiwan from July 2–8.

Pool A
Country	City	LL Organization	Record
Chinese Taipei (Taiwan)^{1}	Taoyuan	Kuei-Shan	4–0
Hong Kong		Hong Kong	3–1
Guam	Agana	Central	2–2
Philippines	Makati	Illam Central	1–3
New Zealand	Auckland	Auckland	0–4

Pool B
Country	City	LL Organization	Record
South Korea	Busan	Busan	4–0
Northern Mariana Islands	Saipan	Saipan	2–2
Thailand	Bangkok	Bangkok	2–2
Australia	Perth	Perth Metro North	2–2
Indonesia	Jakarta	Indonesian	0–4

Semi-finals
July 7 – Taichung
2B Northern Mariana Islands	2
1A Chinese Taipei	8
July 7 – Taichung
2A Hong Kong	3
1B South Korea	2

Final
July 8 – Taichung
1A Chinese Taipei	12
2A Hong Kong	2

^{1} Republic of China, commonly known as Taiwan, due to complicated relations with People's Republic of China, is recognized by the name Chinese Taipei by majority of international organizations including Little League Baseball(LLB). For more information, please see Cross-Strait relations.

=== Canada ===
The tournament took place in Edmonton, Alberta on August 4–11.

Province	City	LL Organization	Record
British Columbia	Vancouver	Hastings Community	5–0
Ontario	Toronto	High Park	3–2
Alberta	Lethbridge	Southwest	2–3
Nova Scotia	Glace Bay	Glace Bay	2–3
Quebec	Montreal	Notre-Dame-de-Grâce	2–3
Alberta (Host)	Edmonton	Mill Woods	1–4

Semi-finals
August 10 – Edmonton
4 Nova Scotia	0
1 British Columbia	5
August 10 – Edmonton
3 Alberta	4
2 Ontario	3

Final
August 11 – Edmonton (F/4)
1 British Columbia	11
3 Alberta	1

=== Caribbean ===
The tournament took place in Guayama, Puerto Rico on July 7–14.

Pool A
Country	City	LL Organization	Record
Curaçao	Willemstad	Pariba	4–0
Puerto Rico A	Manatí	Jose M. Rodriguez	3–1
U.S. Virgin Islands	St. Croix	Elmo Plaskett West	2–2
Bonaire	Kralendijk	Bonaire	1–3
Antigua and Barbuda	St. John's	Antigua	0–4

Pool B
Country	City	LL Organization	Record
Puerto Rico B	Guayama	Radames Lopez	3–1
U.S. Virgin Islands	St. Thomas	Elrod Hendricks West	3–1
Aruba	Santa Cruz	Aruba Central	2–2
Sint Maarten		Sint Maarten	1–3
Dominican Republic	San Pedro de Macorís	Solano	1–3

Semi-finals
July 13 – Guayama
1A Curaçao	14
2B U.S. Virgin Islands	5
July 13 – Guayama
1B Puerto Rico B	7
2A Puerto Rico A	1

Final
July 14 – Guayama
1A Curaçao	10
1B Puerto Rico B	1

=== Europe ===
The tournament took place in Kutno, Poland on July 20–28.

Pool A
Country	City	LL Organization	Record
(United States) Germany-US	Ramstein	KMC American	5–0
England	London	London Area Youth	4–1
Ukraine	Kirovohrad	Kirovograd Center	3–2
Italy	Lazio	Lazio	2–3
Hungary	Budapest/Debrecen/Jánossomorja	MOBSSZ Debrecen/Janossomorja	1–4
Serbia	Belgrade	Serbia	0–5

Pool B
Country	City	LL Organization	Record
Czech Republic	Prague	South Moravia	4–1
Belarus	Brest	Brest Zubrs	4–1
Netherlands	Alkmaar	Nord-Holland	3–2
Lithuania	Kaunas	Kaunas	2–3
Poland	Kutno	Kutno	1–4
Belgium	Antwerp	Flanders East	1–4

Quarter-finals
July 25 – Kutno
1A (United States) Germany-US	10
4B Lithuania	0
July 25 – Kutno
2B Belarus	2
3A Ukraine	4
July 25 – Kutno
2A England	0
3B Netherlands	5
July 25 – Kutno
1B Czech Republic	2
4A Italy	5

Semi-finals
July 26 – Kutno
1A (United States) Germany-US	7
3A Ukraine	4
July 26 – Kutno
3B Netherlands	8
4A Italy	6

Final
July 27 – Kutno
1A (United States) Germany-US	7
3B Netherlands	0

=== Japan ===
The first two rounds of the tournament were held on June 30, and the remaining two rounds, originally scheduled for July 7, were played July 15. All games were played in Tokyo.

Participating teams	Prefecture	City	LL Organization
Chūgoku Champions	Hiroshima	Hiroshima	Hiroshima Saeki
Higashikanto Champions	Chiba	Funabashi	Funabashi
Hokkaido Champions	Hokkaido	Asahikawa	Asahikawa Taisetsu
Kanagawa Champions	Kanagawa	Zushi	Zushi
Kansai Champions	Hyōgo	Harima	Hyōgo Harima
Kansai Runner-Up	Hyōgo	Himeji	Himeji Chuo
Kitakanto Champions	Saitama	Saitama	Ōmiya Higashi
Kyushu Champions	Nagasaki	Sasebo	Sasebo Chuo
Shikoku Champions	Ehime	Niihama	Niihama
Shinetsu Champions	Nagano	Ueda	Ueda Minami
Tōhoku Champions	Miyagi	Sendai	Sendai Higashi
Tōhoku Runner-Up	Fukushima	Iwaki	Iwakitaira
Tokaido Champions	Mie	Matsusaka	Matsusaka
Tokaido Runner-Up	Shizuoka	Hamamatsu	Hamamatsu Minami
Tokyo Champions	Tokyo	Tokyo	Tokyo Kitasuna
Tokyo Runner-Up	Tokyo	Fuchū	Musashi Fuchū

Round of 16
June 30 – Tokyo
(Nagano Prefecture) Ueda Minami	2
Tokyo Kitsuana	8
June 30 – Tokyo
(Nagasaki Prefecture) Sasebo Chuo	2
(Fukushima Prefecture) Iwakitaira	3
June 30 – Tokyo
(Saitama Prefecture) Ōmiya Higashi	5
(Hyōgo Prefecture) Hyōgo Harima	3
June 30 – Tokyo
(Chiba Prefecture) Funabashi	8
(Shizuoka Prefecture) Hamamatsu Minami	5
June 30 – Tokyo
(Ehime Prefecture) Niihama	8
(Tokyo) Musashi Fuchū	4
June 30 – Tokyo
(Hokkaido) Asahikawa Taisetsu	0
(Mie Prefecture) Matsusaka	9
June 30 – Tokyo
(Hyōgo Prefecture) Himeji Chuo	0
(Kanagawa Prefecture) Zushi	9
June 30 – Tokyo
(Hiroshima Prefecture) Hiroshima Saeki	0
(Miyagi Prefecture) Sendai Higashi	1

Quarter-finals
June 30 – Tokyo
Tokyo Kitsuana	10
(Fukushima Prefecture) Iwakitaira	0
June 30 – Tokyo
(Saitama Prefecture) Ōmiya Higashi	6
(Chiba Prefecture) Funabashi	10
June 30 – Tokyo
(Ehime Prefecture) Niihama	0
(Mie Prefecture) Matsusaka	9
June 30 – Tokyo
(Kanagawa Prefecture) Zushi	6
(Miyagi Prefecture) Sendai Higashi	7

Semi-finals
July 15 – Tokyo
Tokyo Kitsuana	14
(Chiba Prefecture) Funabashi	4
July 15 – Tokyo
(Mie Prefecture) Matsusaka	20
(Miyagi Prefecture) Sendai Higashi	10

Final
July 15 – Tokyo
Tokyo Kitsuana	11
(Mie Prefecture) Matsusaka	0

=== Latin America ===
The tournament took place in Aguadulce, Panama on July 8–15.

Pool A
Country	City	LL Organization	Record
Panama A	Aguadulce	Aguadulce	3–0
Venezuela	Lara	Lara	2–1
Nicaragua	Managua	14 de Septiembre	1–2
Costa Rica	Santo Domingo	De Heredia	0–3

Pool B
Country	City	LL Organization	Record
Panama B	Herrera	Chitre	3–0
Colombia	Cartagena	Falcon	2–1
Ecuador	Guayaquil	C Unidas Miraflores	1–2
Guatemala	Guatemala City	Liga Pequeña de Beisbol de Guatemala	0–3

Semi-finals
July 14 – Aguadulce
1A Panama A	3
2B Colombia	0
July 14 – Aguadulce
1B Panama B	4
2A Venezuela	7

Final
July 15 – Aguadulce
1A Panama A	6
2A Venezuela	5

=== Mexico ===
The tournament took place in Monterrey on July 21–26.

Pool A
City	LL Organization	Record
Hermosillo, Sonora	Amistad y Deporte	4–1
Santa Catarina, Nuevo León	Santa Catarina	4–1
Reynosa, Tamaulipas	Treviño Kelly	3–2
Guadalajara, Jalisco	Guadalajara SUTAJ	3–2
(Chihuahua (state)) Ciudad Juárez, Chihuahua	Satellite	1–4
Torreón, Coahuila	Liga Infantil y Juvenil Sertoma A.C.	0–5

Pool B
City	LL Organization	Record
Mexicali, Baja California	Félix Arce	4–1
Nuevo Laredo, Tamaulipas	Oriente	4–1
(Chihuahua (state)) Ciudad Juárez, Chihuahua	El Granjero	3–2
Monterrey, Nuevo León	Mitras	3–2
Saltillo, Coahuila	Saltillo	1–4
Ocotlán, Jalisco	Ocotlán	0–5

Semi-finals
July 26 – Monterrey
1A (Sonora) Hermosillo	2
2B (Tamaulipas) Nuevo Laredo	9
July 26 – Monterrey
1B (Baja California) Mexicali	2
2A (Nuevo León) Santa Catarina	7

Final
July 26 – Monterrey
2B (Tamaulipas) Nuevo Laredo	10
2A (Nuevo León) Santa Catarina	7

=== Middle East-Africa ===
The tournament took place in Kutno, Poland on July 13–16.

Country	City	LL Organization	Record
Uganda	Lugazi	Lugazi	3–1
Kuwait	Kuwait City	Kuwait	3–1
Saudi Arabia	Dhahran	Arabian American	3–1
Qatar	Doha	Qatar	1–3
United Arab Emirates	Dubai	Dubai	0–4

Final
July 16 – Kutno
Kuwait	2
Uganda	5
