= 2009 Little League World Series qualification =

Children's baseball competition qualification

United States
- Great Lakes winner: Russellville, Kentucky
- Mid-Atlantic winner: (New York (state)) Staten Island, New York
- Midwest winner: Urbandale, Iowa
- New England winner: Peabody, Massachusetts
- Northwest winner: (Washington (state)) Mercer Island, Washington
- Southeast winner: (Georgia (U.S. state)) Warner Robins, Georgia
- Southwest winner: San Antonio, Texas
- West winner: Chula Vista, California

International
- Asia-Pacific winner: Taoyuan County, Taiwan
- Canada winner: (Canada) Vancouver, British Columbia
- Caribbean winner: Willemstad, Curaçao
- Europe winner: Kaiserslautern, Germany
- Japan winner: (Japan) Chiba, Chiba
- Latin America winner: Maracaibo, Venezuela
- Mexico winner: (Mexico) Reynosa, Tamaulipas
- Middle East-Africa winner: Dhahran, Saudi Arabia

Tournaments

Qualification for the 2009 Little League World Series took place in eight United States regions and eight international regions from June through August 2009.

== United States ==
=== Great Lakes ===
State	City	LL Organization	Record
Illinois	Chicago	Jackie Robinson West	3–1
Ohio	Hamilton	West Side	2–2
Indiana	Columbus	Bartholomew County National	2–2
Kentucky	Russellville	Logan County/Russellville	2–2
Michigan	Grosse Pointe Farms	Grosse Pointe Farms-City	2–2
Wisconsin	Madison	West Madison American	1–3

Semi-finals
August 13 - Indianapolis
3 Indiana	3
2 Ohio	1
August 13 - Indianapolis
4 Kentucky	10
1 Illinois	4

Final
August 15 - Indianapolis
4 Kentucky	10
3 Indiana	3

=== Mid-Atlantic ===
State	City	LL Organization	Record
New York	Staten Island	South Shore National	4–0
New Jersey	Bernardsville	Somerset Hills	3–1
Pennsylvania	Moon Township	Moon Township	3–1
Delaware	Middletown	M-O-T	1–3
Maryland	Williamsport	Conococheague	1–3
Washington, D.C.		Northwest Washington	0–4

Semi-finals
August 14 - Bristol
3 Pennsylvania	2
2 New Jersey	3
August 13 - Bristol
4 Delaware	1
1 (New York (state)) New York	7

Final
August 17 - Bristol
2 New Jersey	0
1 (New York (state)) New York	4

=== Midwest ===
Note: The Dakotas are organized into a single Little League district.

State	City	LL Organization	Record
Nebraska	Blair	Blair	4–0
Iowa	Urbandale	Urbandale	3–1
South Dakota	Rapid City	Harney	2–2
Missouri	Columbia	Daniel Boone National	2–2
Minnesota	Minnetonka	East Tonka South	1–3
Kansas	Cherokee	Cherokee Community	0–4

Semi-finals
August 13 - Indianapolis
3 South Dakota	2
2 Iowa	3
August 13 - Indianapolis
4 Missouri	3
1 Nebraska	2

Final
August 15 - Indianapolis
2 Iowa	7
4 Missouri	6

=== New England ===
State	City	LL Organization	Record
Massachusetts	Peabody	Peabody Western	4–0
Rhode Island	Lincoln	Lincoln	3–1
Vermont	Brattleboro	Brattleboro	2–2
Connecticut	Glastonbury	Glastonbury National	2–2
New Hampshire	Portsmouth	Portsmouth	1–3
Maine	Bangor	Bangor East	0–4

Semi-finals
August 14 - Bristol
3 Vermont	3
2 Rhode Island	14
August 13 - Bristol
4 Connecticut	1
1 Massachusetts	12

Final
August 15 - Bristol
2 Rhode Island	7
1 Massachusetts	11

=== Northwest ===
State	City	LL Organization	Record
Washington	Mercer Island	Mercer Island	4–0
Montana	Billings	Boulder Arrowhead	3–1
Oregon	Salem	Parrish	2–2
Alaska	Sitka	Sitka	2–2
Idaho	Post Falls	Post Falls	1–3
Wyoming	Laramie	Laramie	0–4

Semi-finals
August 13 – San Bernardino
3 Oregon	9
2 Montana	7
August 13 – San Bernardino
4 Alaska	1
1 (Washington (state)) Washington	15

Final
August 15 – San Bernardino
3 Oregon	3
1 (Washington (state)) Washington	8

=== Southeast ===
Pool A
State	City	LL Organization	Record
Georgia	Warner Robins	Warner Robins American	3–0
Alabama	Jackson	Jackson	1–2
Florida	Rockledge	Rockledge	1–2
North Carolina	Charlotte	Coulwood Oakdale	1–2

Pool B
State	City	LL Organization	Record
Virginia	Chantilly	Chantilly American	3–0
Tennessee	Tullahoma	Tullahoma National	1–2
South Carolina	Greenwood	Greenwood Abbeville	1–2
West Virginia	Hurricane	Hurricane	1–2

Semi-finals
August 12 - Ceredo-Kenova
2A Alabama	4
1B Virginia	8
August 12 - Ceredo-Kenova
2B Tennessee	2
1A (Georgia (U.S. state)) Georgia	3

Final
August 14 - Ceredo-Kenova
1B Virginia	3
1A (Georgia (U.S. state)) Georgia	6

=== Southwest ===
Pool A
State	City	LL Organization	Record
Texas West	San Antonio	McAllister Park American	3–0
Mississippi	Biloxi	Biloxi	2–1
Louisiana	Lake Charles	South Lake Charles	1–2
Oklahoma	Tulsa	Tulsa American	0–3

Pool B
State	City	LL Organization	Record
Texas East	Bridge City	Bridge City	3–0
Arkansas	White Hall	White Hall National	2–1
New Mexico	Albuquerque	Eastdale	1–2
Colorado	Grand Junction	Grand Mesa	0–3

Semi-finals
August 11 - Waco
2A Mississippi	5
1B Texas East	6
August 11 - Waco
2B Arkansas	1
1A Texas West	16

Final
August 13 - Waco
1B Texas East	4
1A Texas West	6

=== West ===
State	City	LL Organization	Record
Northern California	Granite Bay	Lakeside	4–0
Southern California	Chula Vista	Park View	4–0
Nevada	Las Vegas	Legacy	2–2
Arizona	Glendale	Arrowhead	1–3
Hawaii	Wailuku	Central East Maui	1–3
Utah	Cedar City	Cedar American	0–4

Semi-finals
August 14 - San Bernardino
3 Nevada	2
2 Southern California	15
August 14 - San Bernardino
4 Arizona	8
1 Northern California	9

Final
August 16 - San Bernardino
2 Southern California	11
1 Northern California	4

== International ==
=== Asia-Pacific ===
Pool A
Team	City	LL Organization	Record
Taiwan	Taoyuan	Kuei-Shan	5–0
South Korea	Seoul	Seoul	4–1
Thailand	Chiang Mai	Sanuk	2–3
Singapore		Singapore	2–3
Australia	Victoria	Waverley	2–3
New Zealand	Auckland	Auckland Baseball Association	0–5

Pool B
Country	City	LL Organization	Record
Guam	Agana	Central	3–1
Northern Mariana Islands	Saipan	Saipan	3–1
Hong Kong		Hong Kong	2–2
Indonesia	Jakarta	Indonesian	1–3
Philippines	Makati	Illam Central	1–3

Final
July 11 - Taipei
Taiwan	11
Guam	0

=== Canada ===
Province	City	LL Organization	Record
British Columbia	Vancouver	Hastings Community	5–0
Ontario	Windsor	Windsor Turtle Club	4–1
Saskatchewan	Regina	North Regina	3–2
Nova Scotia	Sydney Mines	Sydney Mines	2–3
Quebec	Val-d'Or	C B M De Val-d'Or	1–4
Quebec	Salaberry-de-Valleyfield	Valleyfield	0–5

Semi-finals
August 14 - Val-d'Or
3 Saskatchewan	2
2 Ontario	10
August 14 - Val-d'Or
4 Nova Scotia	2
1 British Columbia	4

Final
August 15 - Val-d'Or
2 Ontario	2
1 British Columbia	9

=== Caribbean ===
Pool A
Country	City	LL Organization	Record
Curaçao A	Willemstad	Pabao	3–0
Puerto Rico	Guayama	Radames Lopez	2–1
U.S. Virgin Islands	St. Croix	Elmo Plaskett East	0–2
Bermuda	Southside	Bermuda Youth Athletic	0–2

Pool B
Country	City	LL Organization	Record
Curaçao B	Willemstad	Willemstad	4–0
Dominican Republic	Santiago	Bravos de Pontenzuela	2–2
Aruba	Santa Cruz	Aruba Center	2–2
Sint Maarten		Saint Maarten	1–3
Bonaire	Kralendijk	Bonaire	1–3

Semi-finals
July 24 - Curaçao
1B (Curaçao) Willemstad	8
2A Puerto Rico	5
July 24 - Curaçao
1A (Curaçao) Pabao	12
2B Dominican Republic	2

Final
July 25 - Curaçao
1B (Curaçao) Willemstad	0
1A (Curaçao) Pabao	4

=== Europe ===
Pool A
Country	City	LL Organization	Record
Germany	Kaiserslautern	KMC American	5–0
England	London	London Youth Baseball	4–1
Italy	Ancona	Marche	3–2
Czech Republic	Brno	South Moravia	2–3
Turkey	Istanbul	Mediterranean	1–4
Lithuania	Vilnius	Vilnius	0–5

Pool B
Country	City	LL Organization	Record
Ukraine	Kirovohrad	Kirovohrad/Nove Celo	4–0
Bulgaria	Dupnitsa	Devils	2–2
Poland	Śląsk	Żory/Rybnik/Jastrzebie	2–2
Belarus	Brest	Brest Zubrs	2–2
Netherlands	Alkmaar	Alkmaar	0–4

Quarter-finals
August 9 - Kutno
1A Germany	17
4B Belarus	0
August 9 - Kutno
2B Bulgaria	4
3A Italy	7
August 9 - Kutno
2A England	10
3B Poland	0
August 9 - Kutno
1B Ukraine	1
4A Czech Republic	0

Semi-finals
August 10 - Kutno
3A Italy	2
1A Germany	7
August 10 - Kutno
2A England	7
1B Ukraine	14

Final
August 11 - Kutno
1A Germany	10
1B Ukraine	0

=== Japan ===
Participating teams
Prefecture	City	LL Organization
Aichi	Nagoya	Nagoya Kita
Chiba	Chiba	Chiba City
Ehime	Masaki	Iyo Masaki
Fukushima	Iwaki	Iwakitaira
Hokkaido	Asahikawa	Asahikawa Taisetsu
Kanagawa	Yokohama	Seya
Mie	Matsusaka	Matsuzaka
Miyagi	Sendai	Sendai Higashi
Nagasaki	Sasebo	Sasebo Chuo
Nara	Yamatotakada	Yamatotakada
Niigata	Niigata	Niigata Chuo
Okayama	Kasaoka	Kasaoka
Osaka	Izumisano	Izumisano
Saitama	Ōmiya-ku	Ōmiya
Tokyo	Chōfu	Chōfu
Tokyo	Fuchū	Musashi Fuchu

Round of 16
July 4 - Tokyo
(Tokyo) Musashi Fuchu	2
(Chiba Prefecture) Chiba City	6
July 4 - Tokyo
(Nagasaki Prefecture) Sasebo Chuo	2
(Ehime Prefecture) Iyo Masaki	1
July 4 - Tokyo
(Saitama Prefecture) Ōmiya	6
(Nara Prefecture) Yamatotakada	4
July 4 - Tokyo
(Aichi Prefecture) Nagoya Kita	4
(Fukushima Prefecture) Iwakitaira	0
July 4 - Tokyo
(Okayama Prefecture) Kasaoka	2
(Miyagi Prefecture) Sendai Higashi	1
July 4 - Tokyo
(Hokkaido) Asahikawa Taisetsu	1
(Osaka Prefecture) Izumisano	13
July 4 - Tokyo
(Niigata Prefecture) Niigata Chuo	0
(Kanagawa Prefecture) Seya	9
July 4 - Tokyo
(Mie Prefecture) Matsuzaka	4
(Tokyo) Chōfu	1

Quarter-finals
July 4 - Tokyo
(Chiba Prefecture) Chiba City	11
(Nagasaki Prefecture) Sasebo Chuo	7
July 4 - Tokyo
(Saitama Prefecture) Ōmiya	9
(Aichi Prefecture) Nagoya Kita	2
July 4 - Tokyo
(Okayama Prefecture) Kasaoka	2
(Osaka Prefecture) Izumisano	8
July 4 - Tokyo
(Kanagawa Prefecture) Seya	10
(Mie Prefecture) Matsuzaka	2

Semi-finals
July 11 - Tokyo
(Chiba Prefecture) Chiba City	17
(Saitama Prefecture) Ōmiya	3
July 11 – Tokyo
(Osaka Prefecture) Izumisano	5
(Kanagawa Prefecture) Seya	2

Final
July 11 – Tokyo
(Chiba Prefecture) Chiba City	17
(Osaka Prefecture) Izumisano	4

=== Latin America ===
Country	City	LL Organization	Record
Panama	Chitré	Chitré	6–0
Venezuela	Maracaibo	Coquivacoa	5–1
Nicaragua	Granada	Don Bosco	4–2
Colombia B	Cartagena	Falcon	2–4
Guatemala	Guatemala City	Liga Pequena De Beisbol de Guatemala	2–4
Colombia A	Barranquilla	Del Norte	2–4
Costa Rica	Santo Domingo	Santa Domingo	0–6

Semi-finals
July 3 - Barranquilla
3 Nicaragua	0
2 Venezuela	6
July 3 - Barranquilla
4 Colombia B	1
1 Panama	0

Final
July 4 - Barranquilla
4 Colombia B	1
2 Venezuela	9

=== Mexico ===
==== Phase 1 ====
Pool A
City	LL Organization	Record
Reynosa, Tamaulipas	Guadalupe Trevino Kelly	5–0
Guadalupe, Nuevo León	Epitacio "Mala" Torres	4–1
Guadalajara, Jalisco	Legion Zapopan	3–2
Mexicali, Baja California	Felix Arce	2–3
(Chihuahua (state)) Ciudad Juárez, Chihuahua	Satellite	1–4
(Mexico City) México, D.F.	Olmeca	0–5

Pool B
City	LL Organization	Record
(Mexico City) México, D.F.	Maya	5–0
Matamoros, Tamaulipas	Matamoros	4–1
Torreón, Coahuila	Infantil Y Juvenil Sertoma AC	3–2
Monterrey, Nuevo León	Unidad Modelo	2–3
Nogales, Sonora	La Bellota	1–4
(Chihuahua (state)) Cuauhtémoc, Chihuahua	Broncos de Cuauhtemoc	0–5

==== Phase 2 ====
First Round
3A	(Jalisco) Legion Zapopan	4
2B	(Tamaulipas) Matamoros	8
3B	(Coahuila) Infantil Y Juvenil Sertoma AC	6
2A	(Nuevo León) Epitacio "Mala" Torres	16
Lower round 1
3A	(Jalisco) Legion Zapopan	2
3B	(Coahuila) Infantil Y Juvenil Sertoma AC	3
2B	(Tamaulipas) Matamoros	12
2A	(Nuevo León) Epitacio "Mala" Torres	5

Second Round
1B	(Mexico City) Maya	9
2B	(Tamaulipas) Matamoros	5
1A	(Tamaulipas) Guadalupe Trevino Kelly	6
2A	(Tamaulipas) Epitacio "Mala" Torres	2
Lower round 2
3B	(Coahuila) Infantil Y Juvenil Sertoma AC	2
2B	(Tamaulipas) Matamoros	12

Semi-Finals
1B	(Mexico City) Maya	1
1A	(Tamaulipas) Guadalupe Trevino Kelly	6
Lower final
1B	(Mexico City) Maya	8
2B	(Tamaulipas) Matamoros	7

Finals
1A	(Tamaulipas) Guadalupe Trevino Kelly	12
1B	(Mexico City) Maya	0

=== Middle East-Africa ===
Country	City	LL Organization	Record
Saudi Arabia	Dhahran	Arabian American	3–1
United Arab Emirates	Dubai	Dubai	2–2
Kuwait	Kuwait City	Kuwait	1–3

Final
July 30 - Kutno
2 United Arab Emirates	0
1 Saudi Arabia	15
