= 2010 Little League World Series qualification =

Children's baseball competition qualification

United States
- Great Lakes winner: Hamilton, Ohio
- Mid-Atlantic winner: Toms River, New Jersey
- Midwest winner: Plymouth, Minnesota
- New England winner: Fairfield, Connecticut
- Northwest winner: (Washington (state)) Auburn, Washington
- Southeast winner: (Georgia (U.S. state)) Columbus, Georgia
- Southwest winner: Pearland, Texas
- West winner: Waipahu, Hawaii

International
- Asia-Pacific winner: Kaohsiung, Chinese Taipei (Taiwan)
- Canada winner: (Canada) Vancouver, British Columbia
- Caribbean winner: Manatí, Puerto Rico
- Europe winner: Ramstein Air Base, Germany
- Japan winner: (Japan) Edogawa, Tokyo
- Latin America winner: Chitré, Panama
- Mexico winner: (Mexico) Nuevo Laredo, Tamaulipas
- Middle East-Africa winner: Dhahran, Saudi Arabia

Tournaments

Qualification for the 2010 Little League World Series took place in eight United States regions and eight international regions from June through August 2010.

== United States ==
=== Great Lakes ===
The tournament took place in Indianapolis, Indiana on August 6–14.

State	City	LL Organization	Record
Ohio	Hamilton	West Side	3–1
Illinois	Moline	Moline National	3–1
Wisconsin	Burlington	Burlington	2–2
Indiana	Terre Haute	Terre Haute North	2–2
Kentucky	Owensboro	Owensboro Southern	1–3
Michigan	Richmond	Richmond	1–3

Semi-finals
August 11 – Indianapolis
1 Ohio	6
4 Indiana	1
August 11 – Indianapolis
2 Illinois	6
3 Wisconsin	5

Final
August 14 – Indianapolis
1 Ohio	4
2 Illinois	0

=== Mid-Atlantic ===
The tournament took place in Bristol, Connecticut on August 6–16.

State	City	LL Organization	Record
Pennsylvania	Newtown	Council Rock Newtown	4–0
New Jersey	Toms River	Toms River National	3–1
New York	Stony Point	Stony Point	3–1
Maryland	Brunswick	Brunswick Railroaders	2–2
Delaware	Wilmington	Brandywine	0–4
Washington, D.C.		Capitol City	0–4

Semi-finals
August 13 – Bristol
1 Pennsylvania	13
4 Maryland	3
August 13 – Bristol
2 New Jersey	13
3 New York	5

Final
August 16 – Bristol
1 Pennsylvania	5
2 New Jersey	8

=== Midwest ===
The tournament took place in Indianapolis, Indiana on August 7–14.

Note: The Dakotas are organized into a single Little League district.

State	City	LL Organization	Record
Minnesota	Plymouth	Plymouth/New Hope	4–0
Iowa	Des Moines	Grandview	3–1
South Dakota	Rapid City	Canyon Lake	3–1
Missouri	Columbia	Daniel Boone American	2–2
Nebraska	Kearney	Kearney	0–4
Kansas	Riverton	Riverton Area	0–4

Semi-finals
August 12 – Indianapolis
1 Minnesota	15
4 Missouri	2
August 12 – Indianapolis
2 Iowa	2
3 South Dakota	7

Final
August 14 – Indianapolis
1 Minnesota	8
3 South Dakota	3

=== New England ===
The tournament took place in Bristol, Connecticut on August 6–14.

State	City	LL Organization	Record
Rhode Island	Cumberland	Cumberland National	4–0
Connecticut	Fairfield	Fairfield American	3–1
New Hampshire	Portsmouth	Portsmouth	2–2
Vermont	Shelburne	Shelburne	1–3
Maine	Bangor	Bangor East	1–3
Massachusetts	Southborough	Southborough Youth Baseball	1–3

Semi-finals
August 12 – Bristol
1 Rhode Island	5
4 Vermont	4
August 12 – Bristol
2 Connecticut	10
3 New Hampshire	8

Final
August 14 – Bristol
1 Rhode Island	0
2 Connecticut	1

=== Northwest ===
The tournament took place in San Bernardino, California on August 6–14.

State	City	LL Organization	Record
Washington	Auburn	Auburn	4–0
Oregon	Beaverton	Murrayhill	3–1
Idaho	Boise	North Boise	3–1
Montana	Billings	Boulder Arrowhead	1–3
Wyoming	Laramie	Laramie	1–3
Alaska	Juneau	Gastineau Channel	0–4

Semi-finals
August 12 – San Bernardino
1 Washington	10
4 Montana	2
August 12 – San Bernardino
2 Oregon	3
3 Idaho	6

Final
August 14 – San Bernardino
1 Washington	4
3 Idaho	1

=== Southeast ===
The tournament took place in Warner Robins, Georgia on August 7–13.

Pool A
State	City	LL Organization	Record
Florida	Melbourne	Viera/Suntree	3–0
West Virginia	Ripley	Ripley	2–1
Virginia	Centreville	SYA East	1–2
Tennessee	Spring Hill	Spring Hill	0–3

Pool B
State	City	LL Organization	Record
Georgia	Columbus	Columbus Northern	3–0
North Carolina	Winston-Salem	Winston-Salem National	2–1
Alabama	Huntsville	Huntsville Eastern	1–2
South Carolina	Myrtle Beach	Carolina Forest Community Center	0–3

Semi-finals
August 11 – Warner Robins
1A Florida	3
2B North Carolina	2
August 11 – Warner Robins
1B Georgia	9
2A West Virginia	3

Final
August 13 – Warner Robins
1A Florida	2
1B Georgia	9

=== Southwest ===
The tournament took place in Waco, Texas on August 6–12.

Pool A
State	City	LL Organization	Record
Arkansas	Arkadelphia	Arkadelphia	3–0
Colorado	Grand Junction	Orchard Mesa	2–1
New Mexico	Albuquerque	Altamont	1–2
Oklahoma	Tulsa	Tulsa American	0–3

Pool B
State	City	LL Organization	Record
Texas East	Pearland	Pearland White	3–0
Texas West	Eagle Pass	Eagle Pass American	2–1
Louisiana	Ruston	Lincoln Parish	1–2
Mississippi	Ocean Springs	Ocean Springs	0–3

Semi-finals
August 10– Waco
1A Arkansas	4
2B Texas West	5
August 10 – Waco
1B Texas East	10
2A Colorado	0

Final
August 12 – Waco
2B Texas West	3
1B Texas East	5

=== West ===
The tournament took place in San Bernardino, California on August 6–15.

State	City	LL Organization	Record
Hawaii	Waipahu	Waipio	3–1
Northern California	Napa	Napa National	3–1
Southern California	Huntington Beach	Ocean View	3–1
Arizona	Scottsdale	North Scottsdale	1–3
Utah	Washington	Washington	1–3
Nevada	Las Vegas	Mountain Ridge	1–3

Semi-finals
August 13 – San Bernardino
1 Hawaii	12
4 Arizona	2
August 13 – San Bernardino
2 Northern California	2
3 Southern California	5

Final
August 15 – San Bernardino
1 Hawaii	4
3 Southern California	1

== International ==
=== Asia-Pacific ===
The tournament took place in Surabaya, Indonesia on July 10–15.

Pool A
Country	City	LL Organization	Record
Chinese Taipei (Taiwan)^{1}	Kaohsiung	Fu-Hsing	4–0
South Korea	Seoul	Seoul	3–1
Thailand	Chiang Mai	Sanuk	1–3
Guam	Dededo	Northern All-Stars	1–3
Indonesia	Jakarta	Indonesia	1–3

Pool B
Country	City	LL Organization	Record
Philippines	Makati	ILLAM Central	4–0
Hong Kong		Hong Kong	3–1
New Zealand	Auckland	Bayside Westhaven	2–2
Singapore		Singapore	1–3
Vietnam	Hanoi	Hanoi	0–4

Final
July 15 – Surabaya
Chinese Taipei	10
Philippines	0

^{1} Republic of China, commonly known as Taiwan, due to complicated relations with People's Republic of China, is recognized by the name Chinese Taipei by majority of international organizations including Little League Baseball(LLB). For more information, please see Cross-Strait relations.

=== Canada ===
The tournament took place August 7–14.

Province	City	LL Organization	Record
British Columbia	Vancouver	Little Mountain	5–0
Ontario (Host)	Ancaster	Ancaster Township	3–2
Alberta	Calgary	Rocky Mountain	3–2
Ontario	Windsor	Windsor South	3–2
Nova Scotia	Glace Bay	Glace Bay	1–4
Quebec	Montreal	NDG Minor	0–5

Semi-finals
August 13 – Ancaster
1 British Columbia	7
4 Ontario	1
August 13 – Ancaster
3 Alberta	2
2 Ontario (Host)	8

Final
August 14 – Ancaster
1 British Columbia	13
2 Ontario (Host)	1

=== Caribbean ===
The tournament took place in Humacao, Puerto Rico on July 3–10.

Pool A
Country	City	LL Organization	Record
Aruba	Oranjestad	Aruba North	4–0
Puerto Rico	Manatí	Jose Rodriguez	3–1
U.S. Virgin Islands	St. Croix	Elmo Plaskett East	2–2
Sint Maarten		St. Maarten	1–3
Bonaire	Kralendijk	Bonaire	0–4

Pool B
Country	City	LL Organization	Record
Puerto Rico	Humacao	Humacao	4–0
Dominican Republic	Santo Domingo	Virgilio Jimenez	3–1
Curaçao	Willemstad	Pariba	2–2
U.S. Virgin Islands	St. Thomas	Elrod Hendricks West	1–3
Cayman Islands	George Town	Grand Cayman Island	0–4

Semi-finals
July 9 – Humacao
1B Puerto Rico B	1
2A Puerto Rico A	6
July 9 – Humacao
1A Aruba	5
2B Dominican Republic	2

Final
July 10 – Humacao
2A Puerto Rico A	8
1A Aruba	2

=== Europe ===
The tournament took place in Kutno, Poland on July 27–August 4.

Pool A
Country	City	LL Organization	Record
Czech Republic	Brno	South Moravia	3–1
Ukraine	Kirovohrad	Kirovohrad Center	3–1
Germany-US	Ramstein AFB	KMC American	3–1
Belarus	Brest	Brest Zubrs	1–3
Moldova	Tiraspol	Kvint	0–4

Pool B
Country	City	LL Organization	Record
Italy	Friuli-Venezia Giulia	Friuli-Venezia Giulia	5–0
Netherlands	Haarlem	Kennemerland	4–1
England	London	London Youth Area Baseball	3–2
Belgium	Antwerp	Flanders East	2–3
Lithuania	Vilnius	Vilnius	1–4
Poland	Śląsk	Zory/Jastrzebie/Rybnik	0–5

Quarter-finals
August 1 – Kutno
3A Germany-US	10
2B Netherlands	1
August 1 – Kutno
4B Belgium	3
1A Czech Republic	5
August 1 – Kutno
3B England	10
2A Ukraine	0
August 1 – Kutno
4A Belarus	2
1B Italy	14

Semi-finals
August 2 – Kutno
3A Germany-US	15
1A Czech Republic	4
August 2 – Kutno
3B England	2
1B Italy	9

Final
August 3 – Kutno
3A Germany-US	4
1B Italy	0

=== Japan ===
Two rounds each were played on July 3 and 10 to determine a winner.

Participating teams
Prefecture	City	LL Organization
Aichi	Toyota	Toyota
Aomori	Aomori	Hirosaki Aomori
Chiba	Chiba	Chiba
Ehime	Iyo	Ehime Konan
Fukushima	Fukushima	Fukushima
Hiroshima	Hiroshima	Hiroshima Kita
Hokkaido	Asahikawa	Asahikawa Taisetsu
Hyōgo	Harima	Hyōgo Harima
Kanagawa	Hiratsuka	Hiratsuka
Kumamoto	Kumamoto	Kumamoto Chuo
Nagano	Iida	Iida
Osaka	Daitō	Daitō
Saitama	Kawaguchi	Kawaguchi
Shizuoka	Hamamatsu	Hamamatsu Minami
Tokyo	Edogawa	Edogawa Minami
Tokyo	Tokyo	Tokyo Nakano

Round of 16
July 3 – Tokyo
(Saitama Prefecture) Kawaguchi	3
(Nagano Prefecture) Iida	4
July 3 – Tokyo
(Tokyo) Edogawa Minami	9
Tokyo Nakano	3
July 3 – Tokyo
(Hokkaido) Asahikawa Taisetsu	0
(Shizuoka Prefecture) Hamamatsu Minami	14
July 3 – Tokyo
(Hiroshima Prefecture) Hiroshima Kita	3
(Kanagawa Prefecture) Hiratsuka	16
July 3 – Tokyo
(Chiba Prefecture) Chiba City	17
(Aichi Prefecture) Toyota	2
July 3 – Tokyo
(Aomori Prefecture) Aomori Hirosaki	3
(Kumamoto Prefecture) Kumamoto Chuo	2
July 3 – Tokyo
(Osaka Prefecture) Daitō	10
(Ehime Prefecture) Ehime Konan	4
July 3 – Tokyo
(Fukushima Prefecture) Fukushima	6
(Hyōgo Prefecture) Hyōgo Harima	1

Quarter-finals
July 3 – Tokyo
(Nagano Prefecture) Iida	4
(Tokyo) Edogawa Minami	25
July 3 – Tokyo
(Shizuoka Prefecture) Hamamatsu Minami	11
(Kanagawa Prefecture) Hiratsuka	1
July 3 – Tokyo
(Chiba Prefecture) Chiba City	2
(Aomori Prefecture) Aomori Hirosaki	7
July 3 – Tokyo
(Osaka Prefecture) Daitō	5
(Fukushima Prefecture) Fukushima	4

Semi-finals
July 10 – Tokyo
(Tokyo) Edogawa Minami	2
(Shizuoka Prefecture) Hamamatsu Minami	0
July 10 – Tokyo
(Aomori Prefecture) Aomori Hirosaki	5
(Osaka Prefecture) Daitō	4

Final
July 10 – Tokyo
(Tokyo) Edogawa Minami	8
(Aomori Prefecture) Aomori Hirosaki	4

=== Latin America ===
The tournament took place in Guatemala City on July 25–31.

Pool A
Country	City	LL Organization	Record
Colombia	Cartagena	Falcon	3–0
El Salvador	San Salvador	FESA	2–1
Guatemala	Guatemala City	Pequena Liga Javier	1–2
Guatemala	Guatemala City	Pequena Liga Beisbol	0–3

Pool B
Country	City	LL Organization	Record
Panama	Chitré	Club de Leones de Chitré	3–0
Venezuela	Bolívar	CVG Ferominera	2–1
Nicaragua	Chinandega	Chinandega	1–2
Costa Rica	Santo Domingo	Santo Domingo De Heredia	0–3

Semi-finals
July 30 – Guatemala City
2B Venezuela	3
1A Colombia	8
July 30 – Guatemala City
2A El Salvador	2
1B Panama	3

Final
July 31 – Guatemala City
1A Colombia	2
1B Panama	8

=== Mexico ===
The tournament took place in Monterrey on July 20–29. The 2010 tournament is named "Ramiro Treviño".

==== Phase 1 ====
Pool A
City	LL Organization	Record
Guaymas, Sonora	Guaymas Sector Pesca	4–1
Boca del Río, Veracruz	Beto Ávila	3–2
Matamoros, Tamaulipas	Villa Del Refugio	3–2
(Chihuahua (state)) Ciudad Juárez, Chihuahua	El Granjero	3–2
San Nicolás de los Garza, Nuevo León	San Nicolás	2–3
Saltillo, Coahuila	Saltillo	0–5

Pool B
City	LL Organization	Record
Nuevo Laredo, Tamaulipas	Oriente	5–0
(Chihuahua (state)) Ciudad Juárez, Chihuahua	Satellite	3–2
Mexicali, Baja California	Felix Arce	3–2
San Nicolás de los Garza, Nuevo León	Las Puentes	3–2
Guadalajara, Jalisco	Guadalajara Sutaj	1–4
(Mexico City) Mexico, Distrito Federal	Maya	0–5

==== Phase 2 ====
First Round
3A	Matamoros	1
2B	Ciudad Juárez	5
3B	Mexicali	7
2A	Boca del Río	0
Lower round 1
3A	Matamoros	1
2A	Boca del Río	5
1A	Guaymas	6
3B	Mexicali	7

Second Round
1A	Guaymas	3
2B	Ciudad Juárez	6
1B	Nuevo Laredo	1
3B	Mexicali	0
Lower round 2
2A	Boca del Río	1
3B	Mexicali	9

Semi-Finals
2B	Ciudad Juárez	4
1B	Nuevo Laredo	3
Lower final
3B	Mexicali	2
1B	Nuevo Laredo	4

Finals
2B	Ciudad Juárez	0
1B	Nuevo Laredo	7

=== Middle East-Africa ===
The tournament took place in Kutno, Poland on July 21–24.

Country	City	LL Organization	Record
Saudi Arabia	Dhahran	Arabian American	3–1
Kuwait	Kuwait City	Kuwait	3–1
Uganda	Kampala	Rev. John Foundation	3–1
United Arab Emirates	Dubai	Dubai	1–3
South Africa	Cape Town	Cape Town	0–4

Final
July 24 - Kutno
Kuwait	0
Saudi Arabia	12
