= 2008 Little League World Series qualification =

Children's baseball competition qualification

United States
- Great Lakes winner: Jeffersonville, Indiana
- Mid-Atlantic winner: Hagerstown, Maryland
- Midwest winner: Rapid City, South Dakota
- New England winner: Shelton, Connecticut
- Northwest winner: (Washington (state)) Mill Creek, Washington
- Southeast winner: Citrus Park, Florida
- Southwest winner: Lake Charles, Louisiana
- West winner: Waipahu, Hawaii

International
- Asia-Pacific winner: Yona, Guam
- Canada winner: (Canada) Surrey, British Columbia
- Caribbean winner: Willemstad, Curaçao
- Europe winner: Emilia, Italy
- Japan winner: (Japan) Edogawa, Tokyo
- Latin America winner: Maracaibo, Venezuela
- Mexico winner: (Mexico) Matamoros, Tamaulipas
- Middle East-Africa winner: Dhahran, Saudi Arabia

Tournaments

Qualification for the 2008 Little League World Series took place in eight United States regions and eight international regions in July and August 2008.

One change from the 2007 qualification was the realignment of the former EMEA (Europe, Middle East, and Africa) and Transatlantic regions. Instead of the aforementioned regions (which chiefly were divided by native-born players and US/Canadian/Japanese expatriates, respectively), teams now entered by geography: one for Europe, another for the Middle East and Africa, with both native-born and children of expatriates on the same team from a given country.

== United States ==
=== Great Lakes ===
State	City	LL Organization	Record
Kentucky	Bowling Green	Bowling Green Eastern	3–1
Indiana	Jeffersonville	Jeff/GRC American	3–1
Illinois	Chicago	Jackie Robinson West	2–2
Ohio	Mount Vernon	Mount Vernon	2–2
Wisconsin	Appleton	Appleton Einstein	2–2
Michigan	Bay City	Bay City Southwest	0–4

Semi-finals
August 8 - Indianapolis
2 Indiana	11
3 Illinois	6
August 8 - Indianapolis
1 Kentucky	0
4 Ohio	2

Final
August 9 - Indianapolis (11 innings)
2 Indiana	11
4 Ohio	4

=== Mid-Atlantic ===
State	City	LL Organization	Record
Maryland	Hagerstown	Hagerstown Federal	4–0
New York	Haverstraw	Haverstraw	3–1
Pennsylvania	Devon	Devon-Strafford	2–2
New Jersey	Bordentown	Bordentown	1–3
Delaware	Middletown	M-O-T	1–3
Washington, D.C.		Capitol City	1–3

Semi-finals
August 8 - Bristol
3 Pennsylvania	13
2 (New York (state)) New York	11
August 8 - Bristol
4 New Jersey	0
1 Maryland	10

Final
August 11 - Bristol
3 Pennsylvania	3
1 Maryland	8

=== Midwest ===
Note: The Dakotas are organized into a single Little League district.

State	City	LL Organization	Record
Iowa	Urbandale	Urbandale	3–1
Missouri	Columbia	Daniel Boone National	3–1
South Dakota	Rapid City	Canyon Lake	3–1
Minnesota	Coon Rapids	Coon Rapids National	2–2
Kansas	Cherokee	Cherokee Community	1–3
Nebraska	Kearney	Kearney National	0–4

Semi-finals
August 8 - Indianapolis
3 South Dakota	5
2 Missouri	3
August 8 - Indianapolis
4 Minnesota	3
1 Iowa	2

Final
August 9 - Indianapolis
4 Minnesota	1
3 South Dakota	7

=== New England ===
State	City	LL Organization	Record
Connecticut	Shelton	Shelton National	4–0
New Hampshire	Manchester	Manchester North	3–1
Massachusetts	West Roxbury	Parkway National	2–2
Vermont	Williston	Williston	2–2
Rhode Island	Cranston	Cranston Western	1–3
Maine	Camden	Camden-Rockport	0–4

Semi-finals
August 7 - Bristol
3 Massachusetts	2
2 New Hampshire	5
August 7 - Bristol
4 Vermont	0
1 Connecticut	12

Final
August 9 - Bristol
1 Connecticut	2
2 New Hampshire	1

=== Northwest ===
State	City	LL Organization	Record
Washington	Mill Creek	Mill Creek	4–0
Oregon	Beaverton	Murrayhill	3–1
Wyoming	Laramie	Laramie	3–1
Montana	Billings	Boulder-Arrowhead	2–2
Idaho	Boise	North Boise	0–4
Alaska	Anchorage	Dimond-West	0–4

Semi-finals
August 7 – San Bernardino
3 Wyoming	0
2 Oregon	6
August 7 – San Bernardino
1 (Washington (state)) Washington	15
4 Montana	1

Final
August 9 – San Bernardino
1 (Washington (state)) Washington	10
2 Oregon	1

=== Southeast ===
Pool A
State	City	LL Organization	Record
Florida	Citrus Park	Citrus Park	3–0
Georgia	Warner Robins	Warner Robins American	2–1
Tennessee	Tullahoma	Tullahoma National	1–2
West Virginia	Hurricane	Hurricane	0–3

Pool B
State	City	LL Organization	Record
Alabama	Mobile	Mobile Westside	3–0
South Carolina	Fort Mill	TCFM Yellow Jackets	2–1
North Carolina	Wilmington	Wilmington	1–2
Virginia	Richmond	Tuckahoe American	0–3

Semi-finals
August 6 - St. Petersburg
2A (Georgia (U.S. state)) Georgia	14
1B Alabama	16
August 6 - St. Petersburg
2B South Carolina	0
1A Florida	5

Final
August 8 - St. Petersburg (5 innings)
1B Alabama	0
1A Florida	11

=== Southwest ===
Pool A
State	City	LL Organization	Record
Texas East	Richmond	Lamar American	3–0
Mississippi	Ocean Springs	Ocean Springs	2–1
New Mexico	Albuquerque	Eastdale	1–2
Oklahoma	Tulsa	Tulsa National	0–3

Pool B
State	City	LL Organization	Record
Louisiana	Lake Charles	South Lake Charles	3–0
Texas West	Lubbock	Lubbock Southwest	2–1
Arkansas	White Hall	White Hall	1–2
Colorado	Grand Junction	Grand Mesa	0–3

Semi-finals
August 5 - Waco
2B Texas West	0
1A Texas East	1
August 5 - Waco
2A Mississippi	3
1B Louisiana	12

Final
August 7 - Waco (7 innings)
1A Texas East	7
1B Louisiana	8

=== West ===
State	City	LL Organization	Record
Nevada	Henderson	Paseo Verde	4–0
Hawaii	Waipahu	Waipio	3–1
Northern California	Pleasanton	Pleasanton American	2–2
Arizona	Glendale	Arrowhead	1–3
Southern California	Aliso Viejo	Aliso Viejo National	1–3
Utah	Cedar City	Cedar American	1–3

Semi-finals
August 8 - San Bernardino
3 Northern California	0
2 Hawaii	8
August 8 - San Bernardino
4 Arizona	8
1 Nevada	14

Final
August 10 - San Bernardino
1 Nevada	3
2 Hawaii	4

== International ==
=== Asia-Pacific ===
Asia
Country	City	LL Organization	Record
Hong Kong		Hong Kong	5–0
South Korea		Gyeonggi	4–1
Chinese Taipei	Wanhua	Tung Yuan	3–2
Thailand	Chiang Mai	Sanuk	2–3
China	Guangzhou	Guangzhou	1–4
India	New Delhi	BB & SB Confederation of India	0–5

Pacific
Country	City	LL Organization	Record
Guam	Yona	Southern	5–0
Northern Mariana Islands	Saipan	Saipan	3–2
Indonesia	Jakarta	Jakarta	2–3
Australia	Sydney	Hills Junior	2–3
New Zealand	Auckland	Bayside Westhaven	2–3
Philippines	Batangas	Tanauan City	1–4

Final
July 24 - Hong Kong
Hong Kong	2
Guam	5

=== Canada ===
Province	City	LL Organization	Record
British Columbia	Surrey	White Rock-South Surrey	5–0
Nova Scotia	Glace Bay	Glace Bay #1	2–3
Alberta	Medicine Hat	Medicine Hat	2–3
Ontario	Timmins	La Ronde	2–3
Nova Scotia (Host)	Sydney Mines	Sydney Mines and District	2–3
Quebec	Montreal	Notre-Dame-de-Grâce	2–3

Tiebreaker
July 24 - Sydney Mines
Ontario	4
Nova Scotia (Host)	3

Semi-finals
August 9 - Sydney Mines
3 Nova Scotia	6
2 Alberta	0
August 9 - Sydney Mines
4 Ontario	0
1 British Columbia	17

Final
August 9 - Sydney Mines
3 Nova Scotia	4
1 British Columbia	11

=== Caribbean ===
Pool A
Country	City	LL Organization	Record
Puerto Rico	Yabucoa	Juan A. Biblioni	4–0
Dominican Republic	Santiago	Bravos de Pontenzuela	3–1
Sint Maarten	Philipsburg	Sint Maarten	2–2
Jamaica	Portland	West Portland	1–3
Bermuda	Southside	Bermuda Youth Athletic	0–4

Pool B
Country	City	LL Organization	Record
Curaçao	Willemstad	Pabao	3–0
Aruba	Oranjestad	Aruba North	2–1
Bonaire	Kralendijk	Bonaire	1–2
U.S. Virgin Islands	St. Thomas	Elrod Hendricks West	0–3

Semi-finals
July 25 - Bonaire
Aruba	2
Puerto Rico	4
July 25 - Bonaire
Dominican Republic	4
Curaçao	15

Final
July 26 - Bonaire
Puerto Rico	0
Curaçao	1

=== Europe ===
Pool A
Country	City	LL Organization	Record
Italy	Emilia	Emilia	5–1
Netherlands	Utrecht	Willows Utrecht	5–1
Ukraine	Kirovograd	Kirovograd/Nove Celo	4–2
Belgium	Brussels	Brussels	3–3
Moldova	Tiraspol	Kvint	3–3
Bulgaria	Doupnitza	Doupnitza	1–5
Poland	Żory	BUKS Gepardy Żory	0–6

Pool B
Country	City	LL Organization	Record
England	London	London Youth Baseball	6–0
Czech Republic	South Moravia	South Moravia	5–1
Germany	Mannheim	Baden-Württemberg	4–2
Lithuania	Vilnius	Vilnius	3–3
Turkey	Istanbul	Turkiye	2–4
Sweden	Malardalen	Malardalen	1–5
Ireland	Dublin	Ireland	0–6

Semi-finals
August 7 - Kutno
2A Netherlands	3
1B England	1
August 7 - Kutno
2B Czech Republic	4
1A Italy	7

Final
August 8 - Kutno
2A Netherlands	1
1A Italy	8

=== Japan ===
Round of 16
July 5 - Tokyo
(Miyagi Prefecture) Sendai Aobo	1
(Tokyo) Edogawa Minami	5
July 5 - Tokyo
(Nagano Prefecture) Iida	1
Tokyo Kitasuna	8
July 5 - Tokyo
(Kumamoto Prefecture) Kumamoto Ozou	0
(Chiba Prefecture) Narita	1
July 5 - Tokyo
(Ehime Prefecture) Niihama	5
Sapporo	1
July 5 - Tokyo
(Osaka Prefecture) Kaizuka	7
(Aichi Prefecture) Toyota	2
July 5 - Tokyo
(Hyōgo Prefecture) Takarazuka	1
(Saitama Prefecture) Ōmiya	2
July 5 - Tokyo
(Hiroshima Prefecture) Hiroshima Nishi	5
(Mie Prefecture) Matsusaka	6
July 5 - Tokyo
(Fukushima Prefecture) Kōriyama	5
(Kanagawa Prefecture) Ninomya Ohiso	4

Quarter-finals
July 5 - Tokyo
(Tokyo) Edogawa Minami	13
Tokyo Kitasuna	7
July 5 - Tokyo
(Chiba Prefecture) Narita	4
(Ehime Prefecture) Niihama	7
July 5 - Tokyo
(Osaka Prefecture) Kaizuka	1
(Saitama Prefecture) Ōmiya	12
July 5 - Tokyo
(Mie Prefecture) Matsusaka	13
(Fukushima Prefecture) Kōriyama	4

Semi-finals
July 12 – Tokyo
(Tokyo) Edogawa Minami	30
(Ehime Prefecture) Niihama	4
July 12 - Tokyo
(Saitama Prefecture) Ōmiya	0
(Mie Prefecture) Matsusaka	4

Final
July 12 – Tokyo
(Tokyo) Edogawa Minami	11
(Mie Prefecture) Matsusaka	0

=== Latin America ===
Country	City	LL Organization	Record
Venezuela	Valencia	Flor Amarillo	3–1
Venezuela	Maracaibo	Coquivacoa	3–1
Panama		Aguadulce Cabezeva	2–2
Guatemala	Guatemala City	Liga Pequena Javier de Baseball	1–3
Colombia		Falcon	1–3

Semi-finals
June 27 - Maracaibo
3 Panama	0
2 Venezuela (Maracaibo)	7
June 27 - Maracaibo
4 Guatemala	0
1 Venezuela (Valencia)	18

Final
June 28 - Maracaibo
2 Venezuela (Maracaibo)	9
1 Venezuela (Valencia)	0

=== Mexico ===
==== Phase 1 ====
Pool A
City	LL Organization	Record
(Mexico City) México, D.F.	Maya	4–1
Guadalupe, Nuevo León	Epitacio "Mala" Torres	4–1
Hermosillo, Sonora	Jose Alberto Healy	3–2
(Chihuahua (state)) Delicias, Chihuahua	A Cura Trillo	2–3
Reynosa, Tamaulipas	Niños Heroes	1–4
Guadalajara, Jalisco	Guadalajara Suta	1–4

Pool B
City	LL Organization	Record
Guaymas, Sonora	Guaymas Sector Pesca	4–1
Matamoros, Tamaulipas	Matamoros	4–1
(Mexico City) México, D.F.	Linda Vista	3–2
Guadalupe, Nuevo León	Guadalupe Linda Vista	3–2
Guadalajara, Jalisco	Legion Zapopan	1–4
(Chihuahua (state)) Ciudad Juárez, Chihuahua	Satellite	0–5

==== Phase 2 ====
City	LL Organization	Record
Matamoros, Tamaulipas	Matamoros	5–0
Guaymas, Sonora	Guaymas Sector Pesca	4–1
(Mexico City) México, D.F.	Linda Vista	3–2
Guadalupe, Nuevo León	Epitacio "Mala" Torres	2–3
(Mexico City) México, D.F.	Maya	1–4
Hermosillo, Sonora	Jose Alberto Healy	0–5

==== Phase 3 ====
Semi-finals
July 26-Monterrey
(Mexico City) Linda Vista	2
(Sonora) Guaymas Sector Pesca	4
July 26-Monterrey
(Nuevo León) Epitacio "Mala" Torres	3
(Tamaulipas) Matamoros	6

Final
July 27-Monterrey
(Sonora) Guaymas Sector Pesca	1
(Tamaulipas) Matamoros	5

=== Middle East-Africa ===
Country	City	LL Organization	Record
Saudi Arabia	Dhahran	Arabian American	3–0
United Arab Emirates	Dubai	Dubai	1–2
Kuwait	Kuwait City	Kuwait	1–2
Uganda	Kampala	Rev. John Foundation	1–2

Final
July 27 - Kutno
United Arab Emirates	0
Saudi Arabia	5
