= 2011 Little League World Series qualification =

Youth Baseball Tournament

United States
- Great Lakes winner: La Grange, Kentucky
- Mid-Atlantic winner: Clinton County, Pennsylvania
- Midwest winner: Rapid City, South Dakota
- New England winner: Cumberland, Rhode Island
- Northwest winner: Billings, Montana
- Southeast winner: (Georgia (U.S. state)) Warner Robins, Georgia
- Southwest winner: Lafayette, Louisiana
- West winner: Huntington Beach, California

International
- Asia-Pacific winner: Kaohsiung, Taiwan
- Canada winner: (Canada) Langley, British Columbia
- Caribbean winner: Oranjestad, Aruba
- Europe winner: Rotterdam, Netherlands
- Japan winner: (Japan) Hamamatsu, Shizuoka
- Latin America winner: Maracay, Venezuela
- Mexico winner: (Mexico) Mexicali, Baja California
- Middle East-Africa winner: Dhahran, Saudi Arabia

Tournaments

Qualification for the 2011 Little League World Series took place in eight United States regions and eight international regions from June through August 2011.

== United States ==
=== Great Lakes ===
The tournament took place in Indianapolis on August 5–13.

State	City	LL Organization	Record
Indiana	Evansville	Golfmoor	4–0
Kentucky	La Grange	North Oldham	3–1
Michigan	Grosse Pointe Park	Grosse Pointe Park	2–2
Ohio	Hamilton	West Side	2–2
Wisconsin	Burlington	Burlington	1–3
Illinois	Rock Falls	Rock Falls	0–4

Semi-finals
August 10 – Indianapolis
1 Indiana	3
4 Ohio	4
August 10 – Indianapolis
2 Kentucky	8
3 Michigan	0

Final
August 13 – Indianapolis
4 Ohio	0
2 Kentucky	3

=== Mid-Atlantic ===
The tournament took place in Bristol, Connecticut on August 5–15.

State	City	LL Organization	Record
Pennsylvania	Clinton County	Keystone	4–0
Delaware	Newark	Newark National	4–0
New Jersey	Paramus	Paramus	2–2
New York	Staten Island	Great Kills American	1–3
Maryland	Williamsport	Conocoheague	1–3
Washington, D.C.		Northwest Washington	0–4

Semi-finals
August 12 – Bristol
1 Pennsylvania	3
4 New York	0
August 12 – Bristol
2 Delaware	1
3 New Jersey	2

Final
August 15 – Bristol
1 Pennsylvania	5
3 New Jersey	2

=== Midwest ===
The tournament took place in Indianapolis on August 6–13.

Note: The Dakotas are organized into a single Little League district.

State	City	LL Organization	Record
South Dakota	Rapid City	Harney	3–1
Iowa	Des Moines	Grandview	3–1
Nebraska	Kearney	Kearney	2–2
Missouri	Webb City	Webb City	2–2
Minnesota	Circle Pines	Centennial Lakes West	2–2
Kansas	Cherokee	Cherokee Community	0–4

Semi-finals
August 11 – Indianapolis
1 South Dakota	7
4 Missouri	2
August 11 – Indianapolis
2 Iowa	1
3 Nebraska	5

Final
August 13 – Indianapolis
1 South Dakota	4
3 Nebraska	2

=== New England ===
The tournament took place in Bristol, Connecticut on August 5–13.

State	City	LL Organization	Record
New Hampshire	Goffstown	Goffstown Junior Baseball	4–0
Connecticut	Fairfield	Fairfield American	3–1
Rhode Island	Cumberland	Cumberland American	2–2
Massachusetts	Andover	Andover National	2–2
Maine	Yarmouth	Yarmouth	1–3
Vermont	Barre	Barre Community	0–4

Semi-finals
August 11 – Bristol
1 New Hampshire	4
4 Massachusetts	9
August 11 – Bristol
2 Connecticut	7
3 Rhode Island	8

Final
August 13 – Bristol
4 Massachusetts	7
3 Rhode Island	13

=== Northwest ===
The tournament took place in San Bernardino, California on August 5–13.

State	City	LL Organization	Record
Washington	Bothell	North Bothell	4–0
Montana	Billings	Billings Big Sky	3–1
Idaho	Lewiston	Lewiston	2–2
Oregon	Bend	Bend South	2–2
Wyoming	Laramie	Laramie	1–3
Alaska	Anchorage	Abbott-O-Rabbit	0–4

Semi-finals
August 11 – San Bernardino
1 Washington	3
4 Oregon	4
August 11 – San Bernardino
2 Montana	6
3 Idaho	2

Final
August 13 – San Bernardino
4 Oregon	1
2 Montana	7

=== Southeast ===
The tournament took place in Warner Robins, Georgia on August 5–12.

Pool A
State	City	LL Organization	Record
Florida	Tampa	New Tampa	3–0
West Virginia	Fairmont	Fairmont	2–1
Virginia	Reston	Reston National	1–2
South Carolina	Irmo	Irmo	0–3

Pool B
State	City	LL Organization	Record
Georgia	Warner Robins	Warner Robins American East	3–0
Alabama	Mobile	Westside	2–1
North Carolina	Greenville	Tar Heel	1–2
Tennessee	Goodlettsville	Goodlettsville Baseball	0–3

Semi-finals
August 10 – Warner Robins
1A Florida	12
2B Alabama	6
August 10 – Warner Robins
1B Georgia	7
2A West Virginia	0

Final
August 12 – Warner Robins
1A Florida	2
1B Georgia	4

=== Southwest ===
The tournament took place in Waco, Texas on August 5–11.

Pool A
State	City	LL Organization	Record
Louisiana	Lafayette	Lafayette	3–0
Texas East	Pearland	Pearland Maroon	2–1
Texas West	Midland	Midland Northern	1–2
Arkansas	White Hall	White Hall	0–3

Pool B
State	City	LL Organization	Record
Colorado	Boulder	North Boulder	3–0
New Mexico	Albuquerque	Altamont	2–1
Mississippi	Ocean Springs	Ocean Springs	1–2
Oklahoma	McAlester	Pittsburg County	0–3

Semi-finals
August 9 – Waco
1A Louisiana	14
2B New Mexico	6
August 9 – Waco
1B Colorado	4
2A Texas East	5

Final
August 11 – Waco (7 inn.)
1A Louisiana	8
2A Texas East	7

=== West ===
The tournament took place in San Bernardino, California on August 5–13.

State	City	LL Organization	Record
Southern California	Huntington Beach	Ocean View	4–0
Northern California	Red Bluff	Red Bluff	2–2
Nevada	Las Vegas	Silverado	2–2
Utah	Washington	Washington	2–2
Arizona	Rio Rico	Rio Rico	1–3
Hawaii	Wailuku	Central East Maui	1–3

Semi-finals
August 12 – San Bernardino
1 Southern California	5
4 Utah	0
August 12 – San Bernardino
2 Northern California	3
3 Nevada	2

Final
August 13 – San Bernardino
1 Southern California	2
2 Northern California	1

== International ==
=== Asia-Pacific ===
The tournament took place in Guam from July 9–15.

Pool A
Country	City	LL Organization	Record
Taiwan	Kaohsiung	Ching-Tan	5–0
Thailand	Chiang Mai	Sanuk	3–2
Singapore		Singapore	3–2
Australia	Adelaide	Southern Adelaide Districts	2–3
New Zealand	Auckland	Bayside Westhaven	2–3
Indonesia	Jakarta	Indonesian	0–5

Pool B
Country	City	LL Organization	Record
South Korea			4–0
Guam	Agana	Central	3–1
Northern Mariana Islands	Saipan	Saipan	1–3
Hong Kong		Hong Kong	1–3
Philippines	Makati City	Illam Central	1–3

Semi-finals
July 14 – Guam
1A Taiwan	12
2B Guam	2
July 14 – Guam
2A Thailand	0
1B South Korea	10

Final
July 15 – Guam
1A Taiwan	3
1B South Korea	1

=== Canada ===
The tournament took place in North Vancouver, British Columbia on August 6–13.

Province	City	LL Organization	Record
Ontario	Toronto	High Park	5–0
British Columbia	Langley	Langley	4–1
British Columbia (Host)	North Vancouver	Mt. Seymour	3–2
Quebec	Valleyfield	Valleyfield	2–3
Alberta	Calgary	Rocky Mountain	1–4
Nova Scotia	Sydney	Sydney Steel Kings	0–5

Semi-finals
August 12 – North Vancouver
1 Ontario	3
4 Quebec	4
August 12 – North Vancouver
2 British Columbia	2
3 British Columbia (Host)	1

Final
August 13 – North Vancouver (4 inn.)
4 Quebec	0
2 British Columbia	11

=== Caribbean ===
The tournament took place St. Thomas, U.S. Virgin Islands on July 9–16.

Pool A
Country	City	LL Organization	Record
Puerto Rico	Manatí	Jose M. Rodriguez	4–0
U.S. Virgin Islands A	St. Thomas	Elrod Hendricks West	3–1
Dominican Republic	Puerto Plata	José Tatis	2–2
U.S. Virgin Islands	St. Croix	Elmo Plaskett West	1–3
Antigua and Barbuda	St. John's	Antigua	0–4

Pool B
Country	City	LL Organization	Record
Curaçao	Willemstad	Pariba	4–0
Aruba	Oranjestad	Aruba North	3–1
U.S. Virgin Islands B	St. Thomas	Alvin McBean East	2–2
Cayman Islands	Grand Cayman	Cayman Islands	1–3
Sint Maarten		Sint Maarten	0–4

Semi-finals
July 15 – St. Thomas
1A Puerto Rico	0
2B Aruba	4
July 15 – St. Thomas
1B Curaçao	7
2A U.S. Virgin Islands A	8

Final
July 16 – St. Thomas
2B Aruba	4
2A U.S. Virgin Islands A	2

=== Europe ===
The tournament took place in Kutno, Poland on July 22–29.

Pool A
Country	City	LL Organization	Record
Czech Republic	South Moravia	South Moravia	5–0
Lithuania	Vilnius	Vilnius	4–1
Ukraine	Kirovograd	Kirovograd/Nove Celo	2–3
Belgium	West Flanders	Flanders West	2–3
Moldova	Tiraspol	Kvint	1–4
Sweden	Stockholm	Stockholm	1–4

Pool B
Country	City	LL Organization	Record
Netherlands	Rotterdam	Rotterdam	4–0
Italy	Bologna	Emilia	3–1
Belarus	Brest	Brest Zubrs	1–3
Great Britain	London	London Youth Baseball	1–3
Poland	Kutno	Kutno	1–3
(United States) Germany-US	Ramstein	KMC American	DQ

Quarter-finals
July 27 – Kutno
1A Czech Republic	7
4B (United Kingdom) Great Britain	1
July 27 – Kutno
2B Italy	10
3A Ukraine	0
July 27 – Kutno
2A Lithuania	1
3B Belarus	2
July 27 – Kutno
1B Netherlands	5
4A Belgium	1

Semi-finals
July 28 – Kutno
1A Czech Republic	20
2B Italy	1
July 28 – Kutno
3B Belarus	1
1B Netherlands	11

Final
July 29 – Kutno
1A Czech Republic	1
1B Netherlands	7

=== Japan ===
The first two rounds of the tournament were held on July 2, and the remaining three rounds were played on July 9. All games were played in Tokyo.

Participating teams
Prefecture	City	LL Organization
Chiba	Chiba	Chiba City
Ehime	Niihama	Niihama
Hokkaido	Sapporo	Sapporo Shinkotoni
Kanagawa	Yokohama	Seya
Mie	Matsusaka	Matsusaka
Miyagi	Sendai	Sendai Higashi
Miyazaki	Miyakonojō	Miyakonojō
Nagano	Nagano City	Suzaka
Okayama	Kasaoka	Kasaoka
Osaka	Ibaraki	Osaka Ibaraki
Osaka	Osaka	Osaka Yodogawa
Saitama	Koshigaya	Koshigaya
Shizuoka	Hamamatsu	Hamamatsu Minami
Tokyo	Chōfu	Chōfu
Tokyo	Tokyo	Tokyo Kitasuna
Yamagata	Yamagata	Yamagata

Round of 16
July 2 – Tokyo
(Kanagawa Prefecture) Seya	5
Tokyo Kitasuna	4
July 2 – Tokyo
(Okayama Prefecture) Kasaoka	5
(Mie Prefecture) Matsusaka	16
July 2 – Tokyo
(Hokkaido) Sapporo Shinotoni	1
(Osaka Prefecture) Osaka Ibaraki	17
July 2 – Tokyo
(Chiba Prefecture) Chiba City	7
(Miyagi Prefecture) Sendai Higashi	13
July 2 – Tokyo
(Nagano Prefecture) Suzaka	1
(Shizuoka Prefecture) Hamamatsu Minami	13
July 2 – Tokyo
(Ehime Prefecture) Niihama	2
(Tokyo) Chōfu	13
July 2 – Tokyo
(Miyazaki Prefecture) Miyakonojō	2
(Osaka Prefecture) Osaka Yodogawa	1
July 2 – Tokyo
(Saitama Prefecture) Koshigaya	4
(Yamagata Prefecture) Yamagata	1

Quarter-finals
July 9 – Tokyo
(Kanagawa Prefecture) Seya	22
(Mie Prefecture) Matsusaka	6
July 9 – Tokyo
(Osaka Prefecture) Osaka Ibaraki	8
(Miyagi Prefecture) Sendai Higashi	4
July 9 – Tokyo
(Shizuoka Prefecture) Hamamatsu Minami	3
(Tokyo) Chōfu	1
July 9 – Tokyo
(Miyazaki Prefecture) Miyakonojō	12
(Saitama Prefecture) Koshigaya	13

Semi-finals
July 9 – Tokyo
(Kanagawa Prefecture) Seya	2
(Osaka Prefecture) Osaka Ibaraki	0
July 9 – Tokyo
(Shizuoka Prefecture) Hamamatsu Minami	11
(Saitama Prefecture) Koshigaya	1

Final
July 9 – Tokyo
(Kanagawa Prefecture) Seya	3
(Shizuoka Prefecture) Hamamatsu Minami	14

=== Latin America ===
The tournament took place in San José, Costa Rica on July 16–23.

Pool A
Country	City	LL Organization	Record
Venezuela	Maracay	Gran Maracay	4–0
Panama	David	David Doleguita	3–1
Honduras	San Pedro Sula	Mariners	2–2
Costa Rica	San José	Atlantica	1–3
Brazil	São Paulo	Liga Paulista Baseball District 1	0–4

Pool B
Country	City	LL Organization	Record
Colombia	Bolívar	Falcon	4–1
El Salvador	San Salvador	FESA	4–1
Nicaragua	Chinandega	El Viejo	3–2
Costa Rica	Santo Domingo	Santa Domingo De Heredia	3–2
Guatemala	Guatemala City	Liga Pequena De Beisbol De Guatemala	1–4
Ecuador	Guayaquil	Unidad Miraflores	0–5

Semi-finals
July 22 – San José
1A Venezuela	4
2B El Salvador	3
July 22 – San José
1B Colombia	6
2A Panama	5

Final
July 23 – San José
1A Venezuela	13
1B Colombia	6

=== Mexico ===
The tournament took place in Mexicali, Baja California on July 24–30.

Pool A
City	LL Organization	Record
Mexicali, Baja California	Segura Social	6–0
Monterrey, Nuevo León	Mitras	5–1
(Mexico City) Mexico, Distrito Federal	Olmeca	4–2
Torreón, Coahuila	Sertoma	3–3
(Chihuahua (state)) Nuevo Casas Grandes, Chihuahua	Paquime	2–4
Ocotlán, Jalisco	Ocotlan	1–5
Matamoros, Tamaulipas	Villa Del Refugio	0–6

Pool B
City	LL Organization	Record
Nuevo Laredo, Tamaulipas	Oriente	6–0
Guadalupe, Nuevo León	Epitacia Mala Torres	5–1
Tijuana, Baja California	Municipal De Tujuana	4–2
(Chihuahua (state)) Ciudad Juárez, Chihuahua	Satellite	2–4
Saltillo, Coahuila	Saltillo	2–4
Guadalajara, Jalisco	Guadalajara Sutaj	1–5
(Mexico City) Mexico, Distrito Federal	Maya	1–5

Semi-finals
July 30 – Mexicali
1A (Baja California) Mexicali	12
2B (Nuevo León) Guadalupe	3
July 30 – Mexicali
1B (Tamaulipas) Nuevo Laredo	2
2A (Nuevo León) Monterrey	4

Final
July 30 – Mexicali
1A (Baja California) Mexicali	4
2A (Nuevo León) Monterrey	1

=== Middle East-Africa ===
The tournament took place in Kutno, Poland on July 13–16.

Country	City	LL Organization	Record
Saudi Arabia	Dhahran	Arabian American	5–0
Uganda	Kampala	Rev. John Foundation	3–2
Kuwait	Kuwait City	Kuwait	1–3
South Africa	Durban	Kwa Zulu Natal BB Association	1–3
United Arab Emirates	Dubai	Dubai	1–3

Final
July 16 - Kutno
Saudi Arabia	4
Uganda^{[1]}	6

== Notes ==
- ^{1} Kampala, Uganda won the Middle East-Africa Region, but were denied visas to enter the United States. In order to maintain the 16-team field in the Little League World Series, Little League invited the runners-up of the MEA Region, Dhahran, Saudi Arabia, to participate.
