= Little League World Series (Middle East-Africa Region) =

International region, 2008–2012

The Middle East–Africa Region was one of the eight "international" (non-U.S.) regions that participated in the Little League World Series from 2008 to 2012. The Arabian-American Little League in Dhahran, Saudi Arabia won each of the three MEA championships until 2011 when the Reverend John Foundation Little League from Kampala, Uganda won the tournament, however the team from Uganda was not able to participate after their visa applications to enter the United States were denied, and Dhahran was invited to participate in their place.

In 2012, a team from Lugazi, Uganda, won the tournament, to become the first African team to compete in the Little League World Series. Not all the players were able to make the trip, due to costs. Traditionally, the team practiced barefoot, but Little League World Series supporters provided the team with baseball cleats. Justine Makisimu had the first African base hit. As popular as this team became, they were not one of the top contenders in the Little League World Series. Uganda lost to Panama 9–3, and Mexico 12–0, eliminating them in two games. However, they beat Oregon, 3–2, in a consolation game.

Prior to 2008, Middle Eastern and African teams competed in either the Europe/Middle East/Africa region (EMEA) or the Transatlantic region. The Transatlantic and EMEA regions were geographically identical. Leagues from the Transatlantic region generally consisted of children and other dependents of American expatriates, typically Armed Forces personnel, international organization members, and oil company workers (such as the team representing the Saudi Aramco Residential Camp in Dhahran). The leagues within the EMEA region consisted of players native to the league's own country. In practice, however, only European teams competed in the EMEA region, as no teams from the Middle East or Africa ever competed for the regional championship.

The region was disbanded following the 2012 LLWS due to a major reorganization triggered by Little League's announcement that Australia would receive an automatic berth beginning with the 2013 LLWS. As a result of this announcement:

- African countries will now be placed in the Europe Region, which will be renamed the Europe and Africa Region.
- Middle Eastern countries will become part of the former Asia-Pacific Region, which will be renamed the Asia–Pacific and Middle East Region. Israel and Turkey, traditionally considered part of the Middle East, were not part of the MEA Region; they were in the former Europe Region because of their membership in the European zone of the International Baseball Federation. Those two countries will remain in the renamed Europe and Africa Region.

== Regional championship ==
The list below lists each country's participant in the MEA Little League Region Tournament. That year's winner is indicated in green.

| Year | Kuwait | Saudi Arabia | South Africa | Uganda | United Arab Emirates | Qatar |
|---|---|---|---|---|---|---|
| 2008 | Kuwait LL; Kuwait | Arabian American LL; Dhahran | No representative | Rev. John Foundation LL; Kampala | Dubai LL; Dubai | No representative |
| 2009 | Kuwait LL; Kuwait | Arabian American LL; Dhahran | No representative | No representative | Dubai LL; Dubai | No representative |
| 2010 | Kuwait LL; Kuwait | Arabian American LL; Dhahran | Cape Town LL; Cape Town | Rev. John Foundation LL; Kampala | Dubai LL; Dubai | No representative |
| 2011 | Kuwait LL; Kuwait | Arabian American LL; Dhahran | Kwa Zulu Natal BB Association LL; Durban | Rev. John Foundation LL; Kampala^{[a]} | Dubai LL; Dubai | No representative |
| 2012 | Kuwait LL; Kuwait | Arabian American LL; Dhahran | No representative | Lugazi LL; Lugazi | Dubai LL; Dubai | Qatar LL; Doha |

== LLWS results ==
As of the 2012 Little League World Series.

| Year | Champion | City | LLWS | Record |
|---|---|---|---|---|
| 2008 | Arabian American LL | (Saudi Arabia) Dhahran | First Round | 0–3 |
| 2009 | Arabian American LL | (Saudi Arabia) Dhahran | First Round | 1–2 |
| 2010 | Arabian American LL | (Saudi Arabia) Dhahran | Pool C Fourth Place | 0–3 |
| 2011 | Arabian American LL^{[a]} | (Saudi Arabia) Dhahran | Round 2 | 1–2 |
| 2012 | Lugazi LL | (Uganda) Lugazi | Round 1 | 1–2 |

== Notes ==
- ^{a} Kampala, Uganda won the regional championship in 2011, but did not participate in the Little League World Series when their visas to enter the United States were denied. Dhahran, Saudi Arabia was invited to participate in their place.
