= Little League World Series (Midwest Region) =

Children's baseball tournament

Midwest Region
- Most recent season or competition: 2026 Little League World Series qualification
- Formerly: Central Region (1957–2000)
- Sport: Baseball
- Founded: 2001; 25 years ago
- No. of teams: 8
- Country: United States
- Most recent champions: Davenport Northwest Little League, Davenport, Iowa
- Most titles: Iowa (10) (South Dakota) Sioux Falls LL, Sioux Falls, SD (3 titles)
- Website: Little League Baseball & Softball Central Region Headquarters

The Midwest Region is one of ten United States regions that currently send teams to the Little League World Series, the largest youth baseball competition in the world. The region's participation in the LLWS dates back to 1957, when it was known as the Central Region. However, when the LLWS was expanded in 2001 from eight teams (four U.S. teams and four "International" teams from the rest of the world) to 16 teams (eight U.S. and eight International), the Central Region was split into the Midwest and Great Lakes Regions. Starting in 2022, 8 teams will be represented at the Midwest regional with the addition of Wisconsin.

The U.S. states that are in Little League's Midwest Region:

- Iowa
- Kansas
- Minnesota
- Missouri
- Nebraska
- North Dakota
- South Dakota
- Wisconsin

== Regional championship ==
Winner is indicated in green.

=== 2001–2021 ===
Year	Iowa	Kansas	Minnesota	Missouri	Nebraska	North Dakota	South Dakota
2001	Davenport East LL; Davenport	Baxter Springs LL; Baxter Springs	Centennial Lakes Black LL; Circle Pines	De Soto LL; De Soto	Keystone LL; Omaha	DNQ	Harney LL; Rapid City
2002	Grandview LL; Des Moines	Riverton Area LL; Riverton	Coon Rapids National LL; Coon Rapids	Webb City LL; Webb City	Central City LL; Central City	DNQ	Harney LL; Rapid City
2003	North Scott LL; Eldridge	Girard LL; Girard	Coon Rapids National LL; Coon Rapids	La Co Mo Central LL; Higginsville	Grover LL; Omaha	DNQ	Canyon Lake LL; Rapid City
2004	Davenport Northwest LL; Davenport	Galena LL; Galena	Robbinsdale LL; Robbinsdale	Daniel Boone National LL; Columbia	Blair LL; Blair	DNQ	Harney LL; Rapid City
2005	Davenport Northwest LL; Davenport	Baxter Springs LL; Baxter Springs	Centennial Lakes East LL; Circle Pines	Daniel Boone National LL; Columbia	Hillside LL; Omaha	DNQ	Harney LL; Rapid City
2006	Davis County LL; Bloomfield	Galena LL; Galena	Coon Rapids National LL; Coon Rapids	Daniel Boone National LL; Columbia	Grand Island National Baseball LL; Grand Island	DNQ	Harney LL; Rapid City
2007	Urbandale LL; Urbandale	Cherokee Community LL; Cherokee	Coon Rapids National LL; Coon Rapids	Carthage LL; Carthage	Keystone LL; Omaha	DNQ	Harney LL; Rapid City
2008	Urbandale LL; Urbandale	Cherokee Community LL; Cherokee	Coon Rapids National LL; Coon Rapids	Daniel Boone National LL; Columbia	Kearney National LL; Kearney	DNQ	Canyon Lake LL; Rapid City
2009	Urbandale East LL; Urbandale	Cherokee Community LL; Cherokee	East Tonka South LL; Minnetonka	Daniel Boone National LL; Columbia	Blair LL; Blair	DNQ	Harney LL; Rapid City
2010	Grandview LL; Des Moines	Riverton Area LL; Riverton	Plymouth/New Hope LL; Plymouth	Daniel Boone American LL; Columbia	Kearney LL; Kearney	DNQ	Canyon Lake LL; Rapid City
2011	Grandview LL; Des Moines	Cherokee Community LL; Cherokee	Centennial Lakes West LL; Circle Pines	Webb City LL; Webb City	Kearney LL; Kearney	DNQ	Harney LL; Rapid City
2012	Sioux City Westside LL; Sioux City	Girard LL; Girard	Robbinsdale LL; Robbinsdale	De Soto LL; De Soto	Kearney LL; Kearney	DNQ	Canyon Lake LL; Rapid City
2013	Urbandale LL; Urbandale	Girard LL; Girard	Coon Rapids Andover American LL; Coon Rapids	Webb City LL; Webb City	Kearney LL; Kearney	DNQ	Timberline LL; Rapid City
2014	Headid LL; Sioux City	Frontenac Youth LL; Frontenac	Plymouth/New Hope LL; Plymouth	Joplin South LL; Joplin	Kearney LL; Kearney	DNQ	Canyon Lake LL; Rapid City
2015	Grandview LL; Des Moines	Frontenac Youth LL; Frontenac	Coon Rapids Cardinal LL; Coon Rapids	Webb City LL; Webb City	Memorial LL; Omaha	DNQ	Canyon Lake LL; Rapid City
2016	Johnston LL; Johnston	Frontenac Youth LL; Frontenac	Coon Rapids Andover American LL; Coon Rapids	Webb City LL; Webb City	Kearney LL; Kearney	DNQ	Canyon Lake LL; Rapid City
2017	Johnston LL; Johnston	Cherokee Community LL; Cherokee	Coon Rapids Andover American LL; Coon Rapids	Webb City LL; Webb City	Kearney LL; Kearney	DNQ	Sioux Falls LL; Sioux Falls
2018	Grandview LL; Des Moines	J.L. Hutchinson Baseball LL; Pittsburg	Coon Rapids Andover American LL; Coon Rapids	Webb City LL; Webb City	Kearney LL; Kearney	Fargo LL; Fargo	DNQ
2019	Johnston LL; Johnston	J.L. Hutchinson Baseball LL; Pittsburg	Coon Rapids Andover American LL; Coon Rapids	Webb City LL; Webb City	Kearney LL; Kearney	Fargo LL; Fargo	Canyon Lake LL; Rapid City
2020	Not held due to COVID-19 pandemic						
2021	Davenport Southeast LL; Davenport	J.L. Hutchinson Baseball LL; Pittsburg	Centennial Lakes LL; Circle Pines	Daniel Boone National LL; Columbia	Hastings Baseball LL; Hastings	Fargo LL; Fargo	Sioux Falls LL; Sioux Falls

=== 2022–present ===
Following the 2021 LLWS, Wisconsin has been moved from the Great Lakes Region to the Midwest Region. This move is a small part of a planned expansion of the LLWS from 16 to 20 teams. This expansion was originally scheduled to occur for 2021, but was delayed to 2022 due to the COVID-19 pandemic.

Year	Iowa	Kansas	Minnesota	Missouri	Nebraska	North Dakota	South Dakota	Wisconsin
2022	Davenport Southeast LL; Davenport	J.L. Hutchinson Baseball LL; Pittsburg	Coon Rapids Andover American LL; Coon Rapids	Webb City LL; Webb City	Kearney LL; Kearney	Fargo LL; Fargo	Sioux Falls LL; Sioux Falls	Little Leaguers of Kenosha LL; Kenosha
2023	Johnston LL; Johnston	J.L. Hutchinson Baseball LL; Pittsburg	Coon Rapids Andover American LL; Coon Rapids	Webb City LL; Webb City	Kearney LL; Kearney	Fargo LL; Fargo	Sioux Falls LL; Sioux Falls	Shorewood LL; Shorewood
2024	Davenport Southeast LL; Davenport	Riverton Area LL; Riverton	St. Louis Park LL; St. Louis Park	Webb City LL; Webb City	Cardinal LL; South Sioux City	Fargo LL; Fargo	Sioux Falls LL; Sioux Falls	Little Leaguers of Kenosha American LL; Kenosha
2025	North Scott LL; Eldridge	J.L. Hutchinson Baseball LL; Pittsburg	Centennial Lakes LL; Circle Pines	Webb City LL; Webb City	Kearney LL; Kearney	Fargo LL; Fargo	Sioux Falls LL; Sioux Falls	Whitefish Bay LL; Whitefish Bay
2026	Davenport Northwest LL; Davenport	J.L. Hutchinson Baseball LL; Pittsburg	Coon Rapids Andover American LL; Coon Rapids	Daniel Boone LL; Columbia	Kearney LL; Kearney	Fargo LL; Fargo	Sioux Falls LL; Sioux Falls	Whitefish Bay LL; Whitefish Bay

== LLWS results ==
As of the 2026 Little League World Series.

Year	Champion	City	LLWS	Record
2001	East LL	(Iowa) Davenport	Group Stage	0−3
2002	Webb City LL	(Missouri) Webb City	Group Stage	0−3
2003	North Scott LL	(Iowa) Eldridge	Group Stage	0−3
2004	Northwest LL	(Iowa) Davenport	Group Stage	0−3
2005	Northwest LL	(Iowa) Davenport	Group Stage	0−3
2006	Daniel Boone National LL	(Missouri) Columbia	Group Stage	1−2
2007	Coon Rapids National LL	(Minnesota) Coon Rapids	Group Stage	1−2
2008	Canyon Lake LL	(South Dakota) Rapid City	Group Stage	0−3
2009	Urbandale East LL	(Iowa) Urbandale	Group Stage	1−2
2010	Plymouth/New Hope LL	(Minnesota) Plymouth	Group Stage	0−3
2011	Harney LL	(South Dakota) Rapid City	Round 1	0−3
2012	Kearney LL	(Nebraska) Kearney	Round 1	1−2
2013	Urbandale LL	(Iowa) Urbandale	Round 2	1−2
2014	Canyon Lake LL	(South Dakota) Rapid City	Round 1	1−2
2015	Webb City LL	(Missouri) Webb City	Round 1	1−2
2016	Johnston LL	(Iowa) Johnston	Round 3	2–2
2017	Sioux Falls LL	(South Dakota) Sioux Falls	Round 1	0–3
2018	Grandview LL	(Iowa) Des Moines	Round 2	1–2
2019	Coon Rapids Andover American LL	(Minnesota) Coon Rapids	Round 2	1–2
2020	LLWS not held due to COVID-19 pandemic			
2021 (Note: Due to the COVID-19 pandemic, Little League International did not invite teams from outside the U.S. to the LLWS in 2021. Instead, the top two teams in each U.S. region qualified.)	Hastings Baseball LL	(Nebraska) Hastings	Round 3	2–2
2021	Sioux Falls LL	(South Dakota) Sioux Falls	4th place	3–2
2022	Davenport Southeast LL	(Iowa) Davenport	Round 3	2–2
2023	Fargo LL	(North Dakota) Fargo	Round 2	0–2
2024	Sioux Falls LL	(South Dakota) Sioux Falls	Round 1	0–2
2025	Sioux Falls LL	(South Dakota) Sioux Falls	Round 4	2–2
2026	Davenport Northwest LL	(Iowa) Davenport	U.S. semifinal	2–2

=== Results by state ===
As of the 2026 Little League World Series.

State	Midwest Championships	LLWS Championships	Record in LLWS	PCT
Iowa	10	0	9–24	.273
South Dakota	6	0	6–17	.261
Minnesota	3	0	2–7	.222
Missouri	3	0	2–7	.222
Nebraska	2	0	3–4	.429
North Dakota	1	0	0−2	.000
Kansas	0	0	0−0	–
Wisconsin	0	0	0−0	–
Total	25	0	22–61	.265

== See also ==
- Little League World Series (Central Region)
- Little League World Series (Great Lakes Region)

Central Region in other Little League divisions

- Intermediate League
- Junior League
- Senior League
- Big League
