= 2008 Little League World Series =

Children's baseball tournament

Tournament details
- Dates: August 15–August 24
- Teams: 16

Final positions
- Champions: Waipio Little League (United States) Waipi`o, Hawaii
- Runner-up: Matamoros Little League; Matamoros, Mexico

The 2008 Little League World Series, was held in South Williamsport, Pennsylvania. It began on August 15 and ended August 24. Eight teams from the United States and eight from throughout the world competed to decide the winner of the 62nd installment of the Little League World Series. In the championship game, the United States champions from Waipi`o, Hawaii defeated the international champions from Matamoros, Mexico. The next iteration of the tournament in which the international champion did not originate from an East Asian country was 2019.

Activision released a video game in advance of the event, Little League World Series Baseball 2008.

== Teams ==
Pool A	Pool B	Pool C	Pool D
Hagerstown, Maryland; Mid-Atlantic Region; Hagerstown Federal Little League	(Connecticut) Shelton, Connecticut; New England Region; Shelton National Little League	Willemstad, Curaçao; Caribbean Region; Pabao Little League	Dhahran, Saudi Arabia; MEA Region; Arabian American Little League
(Washington (state)) Mill Creek, Washington; Northwest Region; Mill Creek Little League	Waipio, Hawaii; West Region; Waipio Little League	Matamoros, Tamaulipas; Mexico Region; Matamoros Little League	Tokyo; Japan Region; Edogawa Minami Little League
(Louisiana) Lake Charles, Louisiana; Southwest Region; South Lake Charles Little League	(Florida) Tampa, Florida; Southeast Region; Citrus Park Little League	Emilia, Italy; Europe Region; Emilia Little League	White Rock, British Columbia; Canada Region; White Rock South Surrey Little League
(Indiana) Jeffersonville, Indiana; Great Lakes Region; Jefferson/GRC Little League	Rapid City, South Dakota; Midwest Region; Canyon Lake Little League	Yona, Guam; Asia-Pacific Region; Southern Guam Little League	Maracaibo, Venezuela; Latin America Region; Coquivacoa Little League

== Results ==
=== Pool play ===
The top two teams in each pool moved on to their respective semifinals. The winners of each met on August 24 to play for the Little League World Championship. Teams marked in green qualified to the knockout stage.

Ties are broken based on records in head-to-head competition among tied teams. In the event of a three-way tie for first place, the tie is broken by calculating the ratio of runs allowed to defensive innings played for all teams involved in the tie. The team with the lowest runs-per-defensive-inning ratio is ranked first and advances. Second place is determined by the head-to-head result of the other two teams. If the three-way tie is for 2nd place, the runs-per-defensive-inning ratio rule is used. The team with the lowest run ratio advances, the other two teams are eliminated.

==== United States ====
Pool A
Rank	Region	Record	Runs Allowed	Run Ratio
1	Louisiana	2–1	7	0.412
2	(Washington (state)) Washington	2–1	12	0.706
3	Maryland	2–1	21	1.235
4	Indiana	0–3	15	1.285

- Louisiana wins pool based on defensive run ratio. Washington is the runner-up based on win against Maryland.

Pool B
Rank	Region	Record	Runs Allowed	Run Ratio
1	Hawaii	3–0	7	0.389
2	Florida	2–1	12	0.750
3	Connecticut	1–2	15	0.833
4	South Dakota	0–3	25	1.667

All times US EDT.

Pool	Away	Score	Home	Score	Time (Venue)
August 15
B	South Dakota	0	Florida	10 (F/4)	2:00 pm (Volunteer Stadium)
B	Connecticut	1	Hawaii	3	6:00 pm (Volunteer Stadium)
August 16
A	Indiana	2	Maryland	3	10:00 am (Volunteer Stadium)
B	South Dakota	4	Connecticut	9	3:30 pm (Lamade Stadium)
A	(Washington (state)) Washington	1	Louisiana	5	8:00 pm (Lamade Stadium)
August 17
A	Indiana	0	Louisiana	9	3:30 pm (Lamade Stadium)
B	Florida	2	Hawaii	10	8:00 pm (Lamade Stadium)
August 18
A	(Washington (state)) Washington	15	Maryland	5	Noon (Lamade Stadium)
B	South Dakota	4	Hawaii	6	3:00 pm (Lamade Stadium)
B	Florida	8 (F/7)	Connecticut	2	6:00 pm (Lamade Stadium)
August 19
A	Indiana	2	(Washington (state)) Washington	3 (F/7)	2:00 pm (Volunteer Stadium)
A	Louisiana	4	Maryland	6	8:00 pm (Lamade Stadium)

==== International ====
Pool C
Rank	Region	Record	Runs Allowed	Run Ratio
1	Mexico	3–0	2	0.133
2	Curaçao	2–1	7	0.438
3	Guam	1–2	19	1.425
4	Italy	0–3	33	2.828

Pool D
Rank	Region	Record	Runs Allowed	Run Ratio
1	Japan	3–0	7	0.368
2	Venezuela	2–1	6	0.316
3	Canada	1–2	22	1.222
4	Saudi Arabia	0–3	24	1.412

All times US EDT.

Pool	Away	Score	Home	Score	Time (Venue)
August 15
D	Venezuela	8	Canada	1	4:00 pm (Lamade Stadium)
August 16
C	Mexico	6	Curaçao	2	11:00 am (Lamade Stadium)
C	Italy	6	Guam	7	1:00 pm (Volunteer Stadium)
D	Japan	5	Saudi Arabia	0	6:00 pm (Volunteer Stadium)
August 17
C	Italy	0	Mexico	12 (F/4)	Noon (Lamade Stadium)
D	Japan	9	Canada	3	1:00 pm (Volunteer Stadium)
D	Venezuela	12	Saudi Arabia	0	6:00 pm (Volunteer Stadium)
August 18
C	Guam	0	Mexico	10	1:00 pm (Volunteer Stadium)
C	Curaçao	14	Italy	1	4:00 pm (Volunteer Stadium)
August 19
D	Venezuela	4	Japan	5 (F/7)	Noon (Lamade Stadium)
D	Saudi Arabia	5	Canada	7	4:00 pm (Lamade Stadium)
C	Curaçao	3	Guam	0	6:00 pm (Volunteer Stadium)

=== Elimination round ===
Quarter-finals
August 20 – 4:00 pm - Lamade
Japan	11
(Curaçao) Curacao	4
August 21 – 4:00 pm - Lamade
Mexico	5
Venezuela	2
August 20 – 8:00 pm - Lamade
Hawaii	9
(Washington (state)) Washington	4
August 21 – 8:00pm - Lamade
Louisiana	6
Florida	1

Semi-finals
August 23 – 12:30 pm - Lamade
Japan	4
Mexico	5
August 24 – 3:30 pm - Lamade
Hawaii	7
Louisiana	5

Final
August 24 – 3:30 pm - Lamade
Mexico	3
Hawaii	12
Third place
August 24 – 12:00 pm - Volunteer
Japan	4
Louisiana	3

2008 Little League World Series Champions
Waipio Little League
Waipiʻo, Hawaiʻi

== Champions path ==
According to the information provided at Unpage.com, the Waipio LL won 5 matches and lost 1 match to reach the LLWS. In total, their record was 16–2, their only losses coming against Central East Maui LL (from Hawaii), and Paseo Verde LL (from Nevada).

Round	Opposition	Result
Hawaii State Tournament
Winner's Bracket Semifinals	(Hawaii) Central East Maui LL	3–4
Elimination Bracket Quarterfinals	(Hawaii) Kailua LL	5–0
Elimination Bracket Semifinals	(Hawaii) West Oahu LL	8–2
Elimination Bracket Finals	(Hawaii) Central East Maui LL	6–3
Championship	(Hawaii) Kaimuki LL	3–2
Championship	(Hawaii) Kaimuki LL	4–3
West Regional
Group Stage	(California) Pleasanton American	2–1
Group Stage	(Arizona) Arrowhead LL	5–1
Group Stage	(Utah) Cedar American	12–2 (6 inn.)
Group Stage	(Nevada) Paseo Verde LL	1–4
Semifinals	(California) Pleasanton American	8–0
West Region Championship	(Nevada) Paseo Verde LL	4–3

== Notable players ==
- Matthew Batten (Shelton, Connecticut), professional baseball player
- Drew Ellis (Jeffersonville, Indiana), professional baseball player
- Trey Quinn (Lake Charles, Louisiana), professional football player
