= 2012 Little League World Series =

Little League World Series 2012

Tournament details
- Dates: August 16–August 26
- Teams: 16

Final positions
- Champions: Tokyo Kitasuna Little League; Tokyo, Japan
- Runners-up: Goodlettsville Baseball Little League (United States) Goodlettsville, Tennessee

The 2012 Little League World Series started in South Williamsport, Pennsylvania, on August 16 and ended on August 26. Eight teams from the United States and eight from throughout the world competed in the 66th edition of the Little League World Series (LLWS). Tokyo Kitasuna Little League of Tokyo, Japan, defeated Goodlettsville Baseball Little League of Goodlettsville, Tennessee, 12–2, in the championship game. For Japan, it was the eighth LLWS championship overall, and the second in three years. This was the last LLWS to feature players born in the 1900s.

== Teams ==
United States	International
New Castle, Indiana; Great Lakes Region; New Castle Little League	Taoyuan, Chinese Taipei; Asia-Pacific Region; Kuei-Shan Little League
Parsippany, New Jersey; Mid-Atlantic Region; Par-Troy East Little League	Vancouver, British Columbia; Canada Region; Hastings Community Little League
Kearney, Nebraska; Midwest Region; Kearney Little League	Willemstad, Curaçao; Caribbean Region; Pariba Little League
Fairfield, Connecticut; New England Region; Fairfield American Little League	Ramstein Air Base, Germany; Europe Region; KMC American Little League
Gresham, Oregon; Northwest Region; Gresham National Little League	Tokyo; Japan Region; Tokyo Kitasuna Little League
Goodlettsville, Tennessee; Southeast Region; Goodlettsville Baseball Little League	Aguadulce, Panama; Latin America Region; Aguadulce Cabezera Little League
San Antonio, Texas; Southwest Region; McAllister Park National Little League	Nuevo Laredo, Tamaulipas; Mexico Region; Oriente Little League
Petaluma, California; West Region; Petaluma National Little League	Lugazi, Uganda; Middle East-Africa Region; Lugazi Little League

- Taiwan participates under the name Chinese Taipei in many sporting events, including Little League Baseball (LLB).

== Results ==
The drawing to determine the opening round pairings, as well as the unveiling of the schedule, took place on June 14, 2012.

=== United States bracket ===
Upper round 1	Upper round 2	Upper final	Final
August 16 – Game 2
Indiana	4
August 19 – Game 15
Oregon	0
Indiana	3
August 16 – Game 4
Texas	13
New Jersey	2
August 22 – Game 24
Texas	5
Texas	3
August 17 – Game 6
Tennessee	4
California	6
August 19 – Game 14
Connecticut	4
California	6
August 17 – Game 8
Tennessee	9
Nebraska	1	August 25 – U.S. championship (F/7)
Tennessee	12	Tennessee	24
California	16
Lower round 1	Lower round 2	Lower round 3	Lower final
August 20 – Game 18 (F/8)
August 18 – Game 10	California	5	August 24 – Game 26 (F/5)
Oregon	4	New Jersey	4	August 21 – Game 22	Texas	1
New Jersey	10	California	5	California	11
August 20 – Game 20	Connecticut	0
August 18 – Game 12 (F/5)	Indiana	0
Connecticut	12	Connecticut	4
Nebraska	0

=== International bracket ===
Upper round 1	Upper round 2	Upper final	Final
August 16 – Game 1
Japan	7
August 19 – Game 16 (F/9)
Curaçao	0
Japan	2
August 16 – Game 3 (F/4)
Chinese Taipei	0
Germany	1
August 22 – Game 23
Chinese Taipei	14
Japan	4
August 17 – Game 5
Panama	1
Mexico	9
August 19 – Game 13
Canada	13
Canada	3
August 17 – Game 7
Panama	8
Panama	9	August 25 – Intl. championship
Uganda	3	Japan	10
Panama	2
Lower round 1	Lower round 2	Lower round 3	Lower final
August 20 – Game 17
August 18 – Game 9 (F/4)	Canada	3	August 23 – Game 25
Curaçao	14	Curaçao	4	August 21 – Game 21	Panama	2
Germany	2	Curaçao	2	Mexico	1
August 20 – Game 19	Mexico	6
August 18 – Game 11 (F/4)	Chinese Taipei	3
Mexico	12	Mexico	4
Uganda	0

=== Crossover games ===
Teams that lost their first two games played a crossover game against a team from the other side of the bracket that also lost its first two games. These games were labeled Game A and Game B. This provided teams who were already eliminated the opportunity to play a third game.

Game A
August 20 – Lamade Stadium (F/4)
(United States) Nebraska	17
Germany	1

Game B
August 21 – Lamade Stadium
(United States) Oregon	2
Uganda	3

=== Consolation game ===
The consolation game is played between the loser of the United States championship and the loser of the International championship.

Consolation game
August 26 – Lamade Stadium
Panama	4
(United States) California	12

=== World Championship ===
Little League World Championship
August 26 – Lamade Stadium (F/5)
(United States) Tennessee	2
Japan	12

== Champions path ==
The Tokyo Kitasuna LL reached the LLWS by winning all 8 of their Tokyo and national tournament games. In total, they went undefeated with a 13–0 record.

Round	Opposition	Result
All-Tokyo Tournament
Winner's Bracket Round	Tokyo Jōhoku LL	11–0
Winner's Bracket Quarterfinals	Chōfu LL	10–5
Winner's Bracket Semifinals	Koganei LL	10–1
Winner's Bracket Final	Musashi Fuchū LL	7–2
Japan Regional
Opening Round	Ueda Miyami LL	8–2
Quarterfinals	Iwakitaira LL	10–0 (4 inn.)
Semifinals	Funabashi LL	14–4 (4 inn.)
Japan Championship	Matsusaka LL	11–0 (4 inn.)

== Notable players ==
- Mason Gillis (Great Lakes) - college basketball player
- Kotaro Kiyomiya (Japan) - professional baseball infielder
- Ceddanne Rafaela (Caribbean) – professional baseball player
- Jake Rucker (Southeast) - professional baseball third baseman
- Jared Wegner (Midwest) - professional baseball outfielder
