= Lugazi =

Lugazi Kawolo
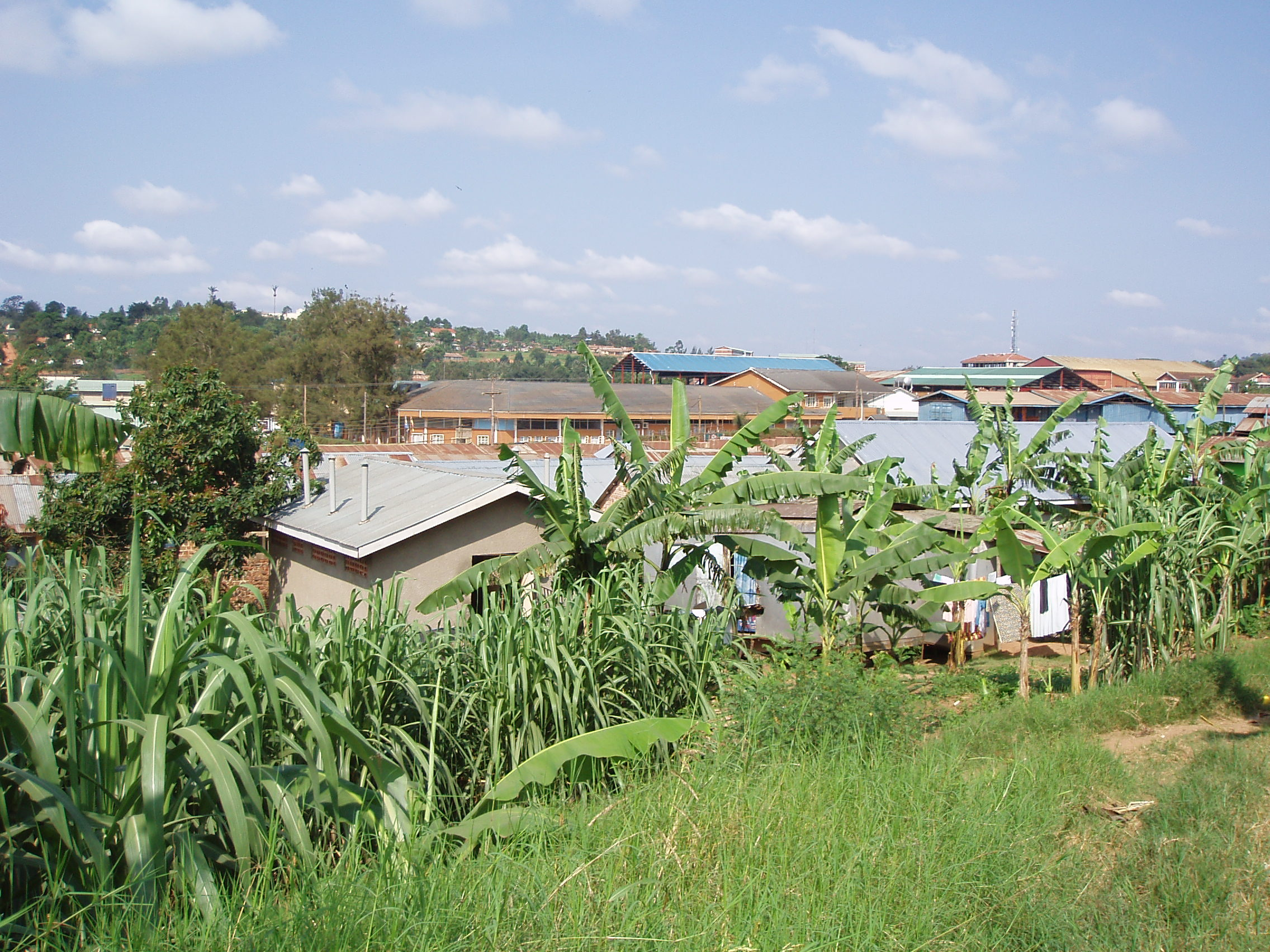

- Location in Uganda
- Coordinates: 00°22′08″N 32°56′25″E
- Country: Uganda
- Region: Central Region of Uganda
- District: Buikwe District

Government
  - Mayor: Asea John Bosco Onzuma
- Elevation: 1,223 m (4,012 ft)

Population (2024 Census)
  - Total: 129,795

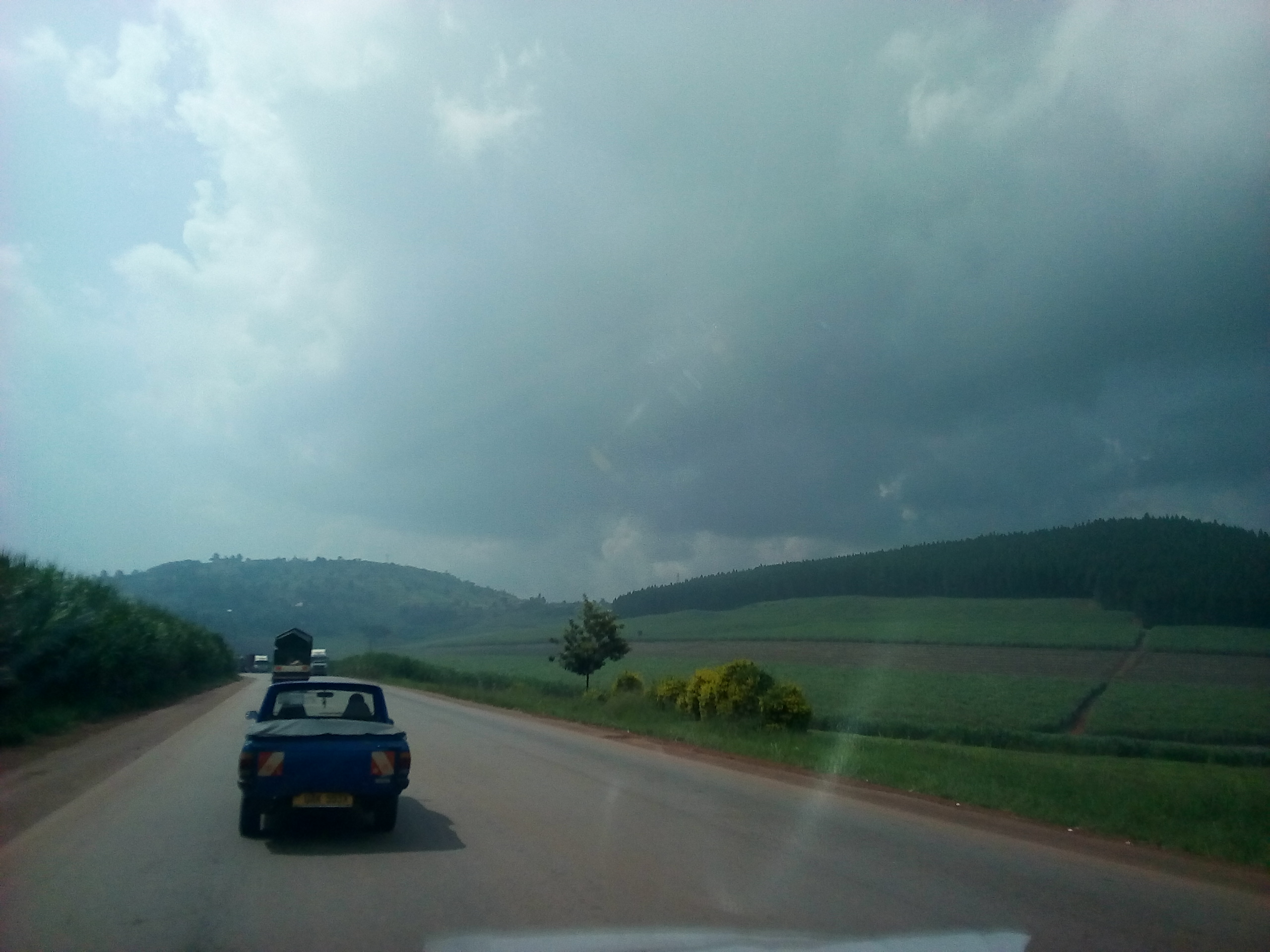
A car moving towards Lugazi coming from Jinja via the Lugazi sugar plantation

Lugazi is a town in the Buikwe District of the Central Region of Uganda. The town is also called "Kawolo", and the two names are interchangeably used by the local inhabitants.

== Location ==
The town is on the Kampala-Jinja Highway, approximately 46 kilometres (29 mi) east of Kampala, Uganda's capital and largest city. It is approximately 25.5 kilometres (16 mi), by road, east of Mukono, the nearest large town, also on the Kampala–Jinja Highway. Lugazi sits at an average elevation of 1,223 metres (4,012 ft), above mean sea level. The coordinates of Lugazi are 0°22'08.0"N, 32°56'25.0"E (Latitude:0.368889; Longitude:32.940278).

== Points of interest ==
The following points of interest lie within or close to the town:

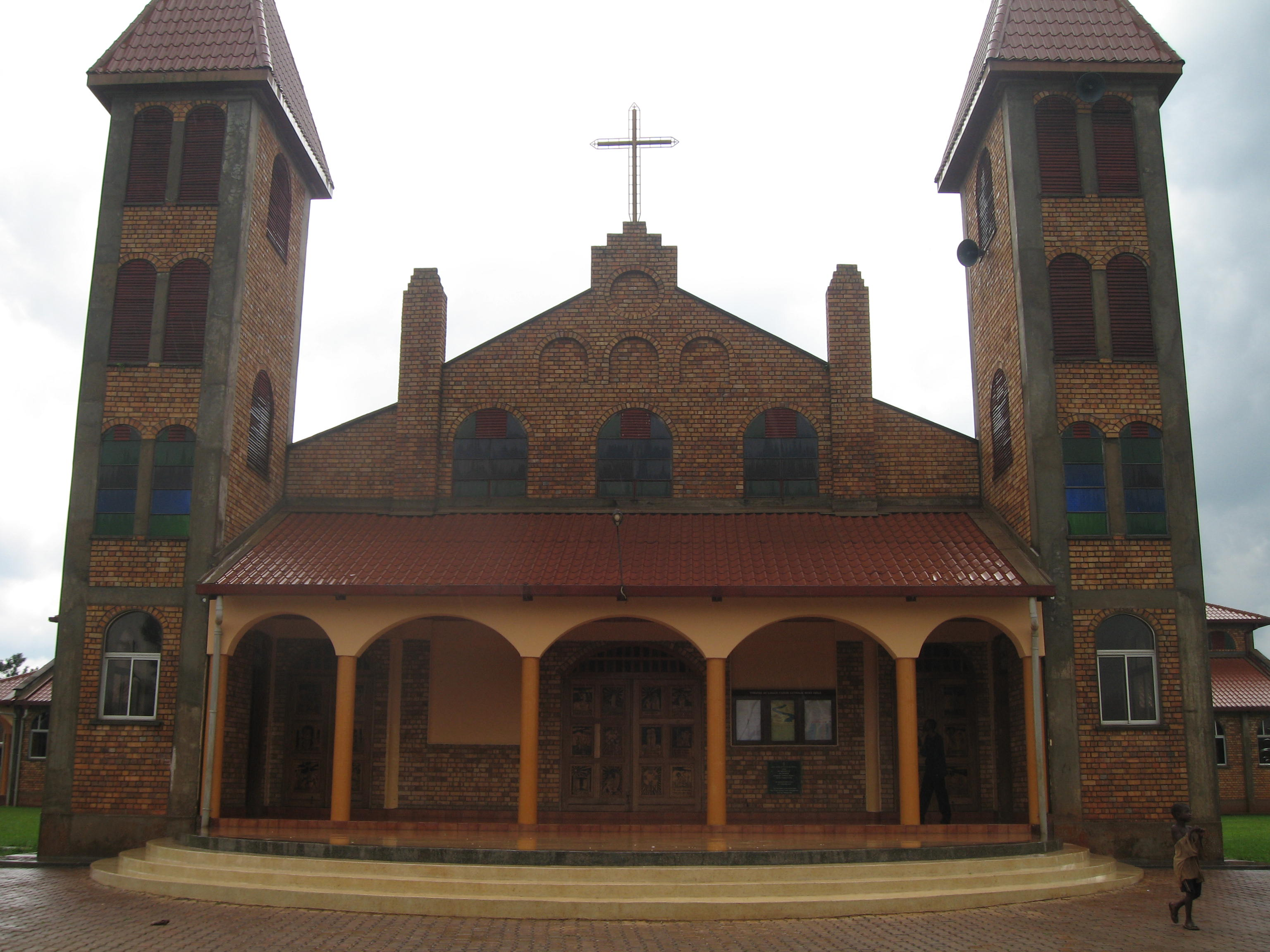
Cathedral of Our Lady Queen of Peace

- offices of Lugazi Town Council
- headquarters of the Roman Catholic Diocese of Lugazi
- Lugazi central market
- headquarters of the Mehta Group in Uganda
- University of Military Science and Technology, which is owned and administered by the Uganda People's Defence Force
- Mount Saint Mary's College Namagunga, located 5.5 kilometres (3.4 mi), by road, west of downtown Lugazi in Mukono District
- Kawolo Hospital, a 200-bed public hospital administered by the Uganda Ministry of Health
- Lugazi Golf Course, which is located on the grounds of SCUL
- branch of the National Social Security Fund (Uganda)
- Kampala-Jinja Highway, passing through the center of town in an east/west configuration

== Population ==
The 2002 national census estimated the population of Lugazi at 27,979. In 2010, the Uganda Bureau of Statistics (UBOS) estimated the population at 34,500. In 2011, UBOS estimated the population at 35,500. In 2014, the national census put the population at 114,163.

== Sports ==
In 2012, a Little League baseball team from Lugazi qualified for the 2012 Little League World Series in Williamsport, Pennsylvania. This was the second ever team from Uganda to qualify and the first to make the trip to the USA. The team that qualified in 2011 were denied visas by the State Department, therefore having to concede the MEA region title to Dhahran, Saudi Arabia.

Lugazi is also the home of the Uganda Revenue Authority SC, a member of the Uganda Premier Soccer League.

== See also ==
- Roman Catholic Diocese of Lugazi
- List of cities and towns in Uganda
