= Elmo Plaskett =

American baseball player (1938–1998)

- Catcher
- Born: June 27, 1938; Frederiksted, Virgin Islands
- Died: November 2, 1998 (aged 60); Christiansted, Virgin Islands
- Batted: Right Threw: Right

MLB debut
- September 8, 1962, for the Pittsburgh Pirates

Last MLB appearance
- May 18, 1963, for the Pittsburgh Pirates

MLB statistics
- Batting average: .200
- Home runs: 1
- Runs batted in: 5
- Stats at Baseball Reference

Teams
- Pittsburgh Pirates (1962–1963)

Elmo Alexander Plaskett (June 27, 1938 – November 2, 1998) was a professional baseball player from the United States Virgin Islands. He played as a catcher, outfielder and third baseman in Major League Baseball. Although his pro career would encompass 13 seasons in the minor leagues and multiple years in winter baseball in Puerto Rico, he appeared in only 17 games in the Major Leagues for the 1962 and 1963 Pittsburgh Pirates.

Born in Frederiksted, Saint Croix, Plaskett stood 5 feet 10 inches (1.78 m) tall and was listed at 195 pounds (88 kg); he threw and batted right-handed. After signing with the Pirates in 1957, he rose through the Pittsburgh organization on the strength of his batting skills. He hit over .289 in six different minor league stops and in 1962 he led the high-level Sally League in batting (.349) while smashing 27 home runs. Recalled by Pittsburgh that September, he went hitless in his first two appearances, which came as a pinch hitter; but in his third game, September 17 against the San Francisco Giants, he slugged a three-run homer, the winning blow in a 5–2 Pittsburgh triumph at Forbes Field; as the starting catcher, he handled Tom Sturdivant's complete game.

Plaskett finished his first MLB trial with four hits in 14 at bats (.286) and was a member of Pittsburgh's 40-man winter roster. Coming out of spring training in 1963, he made the Bucs' 28-man early-season squad and got into ten games, with three starts at catcher. But he collected only three hits, all singles, and was demoted to Triple-A Columbus. He spent the rest of his career in the minors and in winter baseball, retiring from the former in 1969 and the latter in 1971.

In retirement he briefly scouted for the Pirates, and remained integrally involved in youth baseball in his native USVI until his death at age 60 in Christiansted.
