= Saudi Aramco Residential Camp in Dhahran =

Coordinates: 26.3049°N 50.1286°E

Dhahran Camp Aramco compound
- Gated community
- Interactive map of Dhahran Camp
- Country: Saudi Arabia
- Province: Eastern Province
- City: Dhahran
- Founded: 1933

Area
  - Total: 58 km^{2} (22.5 sq mi)

Population
  - Total: <9,700

Saudi Aramco Residential Camp in Dhahran is a residential community built by Saudi Aramco for its employees to live in. It is located within the city of Dhahran (Arabic: الظهران) in Saudi Arabia's Eastern Province. There are three areas recognized by the inhabitants in the Dhahran camp. The first built is known as the Main Camp. It is the oldest part and the busiest as it contains the commissary, various shops and parks, and infrastructure. The second area, known as the Hills, is the quietest since it is mostly residential and more family-friendly. In 2017, a new residential area was opened and is known as Jebel Heights, an extension of the camp on the western edge of the facility. The area of Jebel Heights contains modern villas that vary from three-bedroom houses to five-bedroom houses as well as apartment blocks.

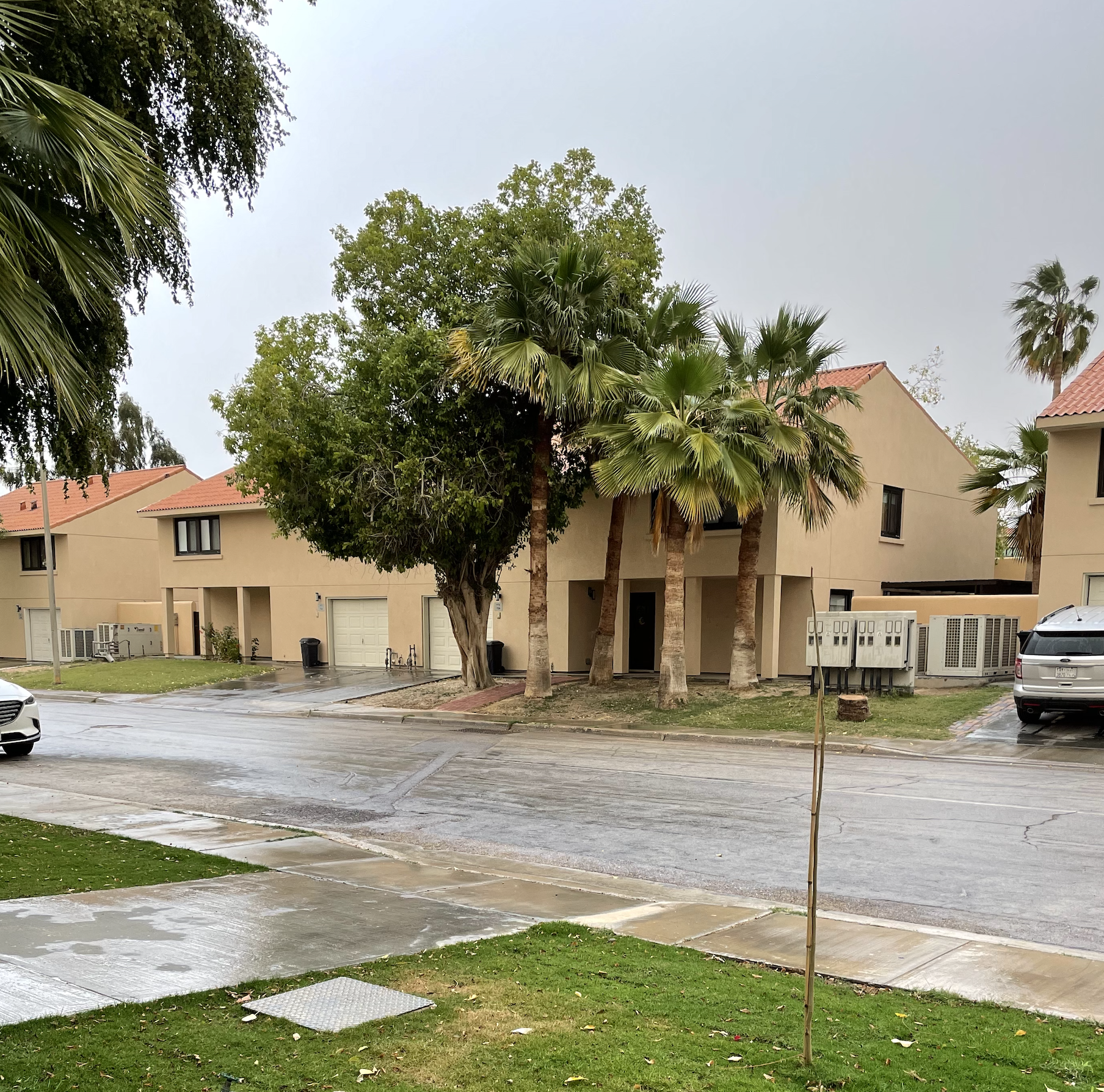
Residential neighborhood in Hills

The Dhahran residential camp is a private company compound, protected by armed guards, within which only Saudi Aramco employees and their dependents may reside. It is located near the grounds of the former US consulate as well as the Dhahran military airbase, which formerly housed the domestic and international air terminals for the Eastern Province. All commercial air passenger operations have since been moved to King Fahd International Airport in Dammam.

The Dhahran camp (Aramco code: DH) is one of three original expatriate oil company compounds or "districts" in the east of the country, along with the camps in Ras Tanura (refinery and port), and Abqaiq (also Buqayq). Later, other Saudi Aramco compounds were built, such as Udhailiyah and Tanajib. More recently, the company established housing areas in various other Saudi cities including Jubail, Yanbu, Jeddah, and Rabigh among others - though not all of these are self-contained company compounds. The Dhahran camp was the first company compound, founded in the late 1930s, and is still the largest, with space to accommodate over 11,000 residents. Originally built to house Aramco's American workforce and their families, Dhahran has in recent decades shifted from being predominantly inhabited by Americans to containing residents from a mixture of different nationalities, including a majority of Saudi nationals.

== Geography ==
The Dhahran residential camp is a short distance west of downtown Al Khobar, the closest Saudi town to Dhahran, and its traditional shopping center. The camp is about 15 km south of Dammam, both older Saudi port cities on the coast of the Arabian Gulf. Looking farther afield, Dhahran is northeast of Abqaiq, also a Saudi Aramco compound, and southeast of Qatif, and further north, Ras Tanura, Saudi Aramco's main oil port. The island nation of Bahrain is also within easy driving distance to the east (about 32 km) across a causeway from Al Khobar.

== Economy ==
The economy of the Dhahran Residential Camp is exclusively based on one company, Saudi Aramco, as everyone who lives in the compound is either employed by the company or the dependent of an employee. Dhahran has been Saudi Aramco's HQ since 1952 when it moved from New York, and is the center of the company's finance, exploration, engineering, drilling services, medical services, materials supply and other company organizations.

== Demographics ==
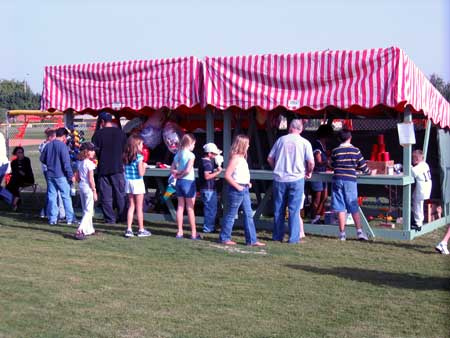
Pee Wee Baseball Winter Carnival

Aramco has several self-contained communities to house its employees in the Eastern Province of which Dhahran is the largest with a total population of about 11,000. While in the past, inhabitants of Dhahran were mainly US employees of Saudi Aramco, this is no longer the case. Due to the ongoing Saudization of the workforce, along with a drive to recruit from less far afield, Western expatriates make up fewer than 5% of employees, both in the company as a whole and in the Dhahran residential community.

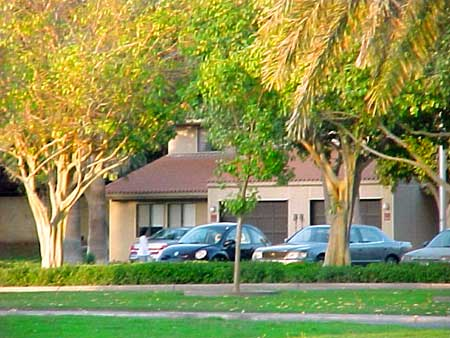
Townhouses in the Dhahran Hills

The community today is made up of Saudis, other Arab nationalities (e.g. Lebanese, Egyptian and Jordanian), Asians, various South and North American nationalities and a few British expats. After several decades of Saudization, many Saudi families now live on the compound, although cultural rules within it are still more liberal (e.g. English is the common language, western clothing is normalized).

The community is also unusual demographically in that all residents of Dhahran are either employees of Saudi Aramco or their dependents; consequently, several age demographics are under-represented; 15- to 25-year-olds (Saudi Aramco provides no university for employees' dependents so many leave for schools elsewhere) and persons aged 60+ (retirees leave the company).

After 75+ years of community life, Dhahran, and the other three Saudi Aramco compounds have spawned several generations of "Aramcons", most of whom have now returned to their country of origin rather than Saudi Arabia. Community ties remain strong years after employees have left however, and "Aramco Reunions" are held by ex-Aramcons in various locations in the U.S. every two years. Additionally, children of Saudi Aramco employees, sometimes referred to as "Aramco brats" have developed their own cultural identity and hold biannual reunions.

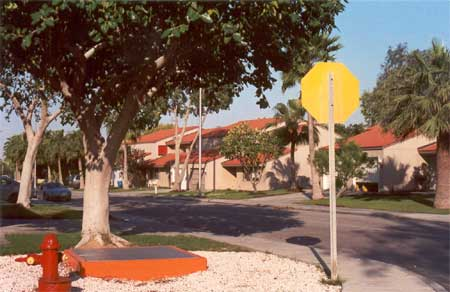
Abu Hadriyah Street in the Hills

== Transportation ==
As the centre of the nation's oil industry, Dhahran has access to transport infrastructure linking it to Bahrain, Riyadh and Kuwait.

The nation's highway infrastructure was modernized in the '70s and '80s and connects the Dhahran area with a number of urban centres in the Kingdom, including its neighbors Kuwait, Qatar, and via a causeway, to the nearby island nation of Bahrain. The oil company built, but no longer maintains, the Tapline Road, which was finally closed in 1990. There are roads which link Dhahran with Saudi Aramco's other major compounds Ras Tanura and Abqaiq and with its nearest traditional Saudi community Al Khobar.

The King Abdulaziz Air Base, a major Royal Saudi Air Force base, lies a short distance south of the compound. The area it occupies used to house one of Saudi Arabia's three major international airports, the Dhahran Airport (DHA). Dhahran airport originally consisted of three sections: the old King Fahd Air Terminal for regular passengers, separate facilities for Aramco corporate use (Aramco formerly had its own passenger airplanes offering international air service for employees until the early '60s), and the Dhahran Airfield, an airfield operated by the U.S. from 1946 until 1962. Today, King Fahd International Airport (DMM) serves the entire metropolitan area of Dhahran, Dammam, Khobar, Qatif and Al-Thuqbah. DHA also used to contain a section designated to Aramco Aviation Department, from which all company-run flights operated, but Aramco Aviation Department has since moved its services to its own buildings located near the King Fahd International Airport. The American air force still maintains a presence there.

Although rail service in Saudi Arabia plays a much more minor role today than 50 years ago, an industrial railroad with a station adjacent to Dhahran still exists, linking it to the capital Riyadh.

Within the company itself, Saudi Aramco runs free bus service for its employees, both within the compound, between the Dhahran Inter-District Bus Station and each of the three other Aramco districts, and shopping bus service into Khobar. Taxi service is also available within the compound. There are few, if any traffic jams in Dhahran even in rush hour (with the exception of the security gates and around the core area). This is in part because all traffic lights in Dhahran camp are computer-controlled to maximize the traffic flow.

Dhahran's main office buildings, where most of the residents of the Dhahran camp work, include the Exploration and Petroleum Engineering Center (EXPEC) Building, the Engineering Building, the Tower Building, the Old Administration Building, and the New (Executive) Administration Building. The EXPEC, Engineering and Tower buildings are connected by a tunnel to help employees avoid exposure to the extremes of the Saudi climate. These offices are located within the Saudi Aramco camp, but outside the residential camp proper.

== Communications ==
Hamilton House (Guest House) in Dhahran City.

The Communications Department of Saudi Aramco used to administer a land line telephone system in the camp, but as of mid-2025 this has been shut down.

Now residents often use regular Fibre Optic Internet services in the camp from around $100 per month from either STC or Mobily.

== Education ==
Within the compound itself, Saudi Aramco operates two schools, the Dhahran Hills School (Elementary, K-4) and the Dhahran School (5-9). The company has never provided a high school, which used to compel employees to send dependent students out of country after the 9th grade for secondary school and college. (A graduation ceremony is attached to this rite of passage, and graduating 9th grade Aramco students identify themselves thereafter as the "Class of 2022", for example). To pursue high school education, most children of Saudi Aramco employees either enrol in foreign boardings or American School of Dhahran, a nearby American-curriculum international school just outside Khobar.

Dhahran schools employ an American-based curriculum. The children of Saudi Aramco expatriate employees of whatever nationality are allowed to attend; however, the children of Saudi employees may not attend (with exception of K4 and kindergarten level), unless they have special permission from the Ministry of Education (very rarely given and only temporarily). Until 1980, Saudi employees living on camp were allowed to register their children in the company school, but thereafter the Saudi Ministry of Education regulations were enforced.

Beyond the compound, the greater Dhahran area is home to the King Fahd University of Petroleum and Minerals (KFUPM), a national technical institution built just outside the compound's original perimeter fence, and the Dhahran Industrial Training Center (ITC), which includes the campus of the selective College Preparatory Center for promising Saudi secondary students preparing for study abroad.

== Media ==
=== Newspapers and magazines ===
All papers published locally are either owned by Saudi Aramco or special community interest groups (SIGs), and they are all free. The main weekly is the Arabian Sun newspaper. Most Saudi Aramco-owned papers and magazines are available online at Aramco's official website (anyone may request a hard-copy subscription free of charge). The papers that are owned by SIGs are available online only through Saudi Aramco's internal network.

Like the publications listed above, the company's Aramco World magazine of Middle Eastern and Islamic cultural topics can be subscribed to worldwide for free.

=== Television ===
Aramco TV (Dhahran TV, and named Channel 3 later) was the first TV channel in the Arabian Gulf area and the second in the Middle East. Dhahran TV started broadcasting on September 17, 1957. Although originally in English, it later started to broadcast in Arabic, but at the same time, viewers could listen to the English version of the TV programs through Aramco radio simultaneously. By 1970, it had become a commercial free, all-English channel after Al Saudiya started broadcasting in 1966. Up until the first Gulf War, Channel 3 was the only English language television station readily available. It was sometimes the object of humour for its airing of dated programming, censored entertainment, and a bland nightly news broadcast. Programming included on-screen calligraphy that announced prayer times and shows that were dated. The channel could not show any kissing between men and women. Most Dhahran residents used their television set to watch VHS tapes or play video games. The main attraction of Channel 3 was that it aired well made documentaries concerning Middle Eastern history, culture, cuisine and environment.

The demise of Channel 3 was due to the fact that Dhahran residents started to get other choices for English language entertainment and news television. In the early 1990s the first Persian Gulf War gave Dhahran residents the ability to pick up the American Forces Network. By the late 1990s, satellite television services were becoming more affordable and offering a wider selection of commercial news and entertainment programming that was less censored and more contemporary. The result was that in 1998, Saudi Aramco discontinued the channel.

=== Radio ===
Saudi Aramco operates the radio stations '91.4 Energy Radio 1' and '101.4 Energy Radio 2'.

91.4 Energy Radio 1, 'Saudis Number 1 Hit Music Station' is a Top 40 pop music station

101.4 Energy Radio 2, 'Music Beyond the Mainstream' is an alternative music station

Both stations stream on the Energy Radio KSA app, as well as a mix of online music stations branded as 'Energy Radio X'. All stations and shows are based in Dhahran and broadcast 24/7 with many listeners using the app to stream in other regions of KSA.

== Sport ==
The Dhahran community has long supported employee-run “self-directed groups” for social and recreational activities.

The groups that remain are organized through four main areas; Cultural Groups; Service Groups; Special Interest Groups and Sports Activities, with the latter being the most active. A number of the sporting groups have in previous years participated internationally, for example Saudi Aramco Youth Soccer Organization (SAYSO) travel teams regularly participated in tournaments in the Middle East and Europe (notably the Gothia Cup, Dana Cup and Norway Cup) and the running group competed in races all over the Middle East. The Little League Baseball team from Dhahran qualified for the Little League World Series in 1983, 1985, 1987–1989, 1991, 1994–1998, and 2000–2011.

== Images ==
Rolling Hills Country Club House

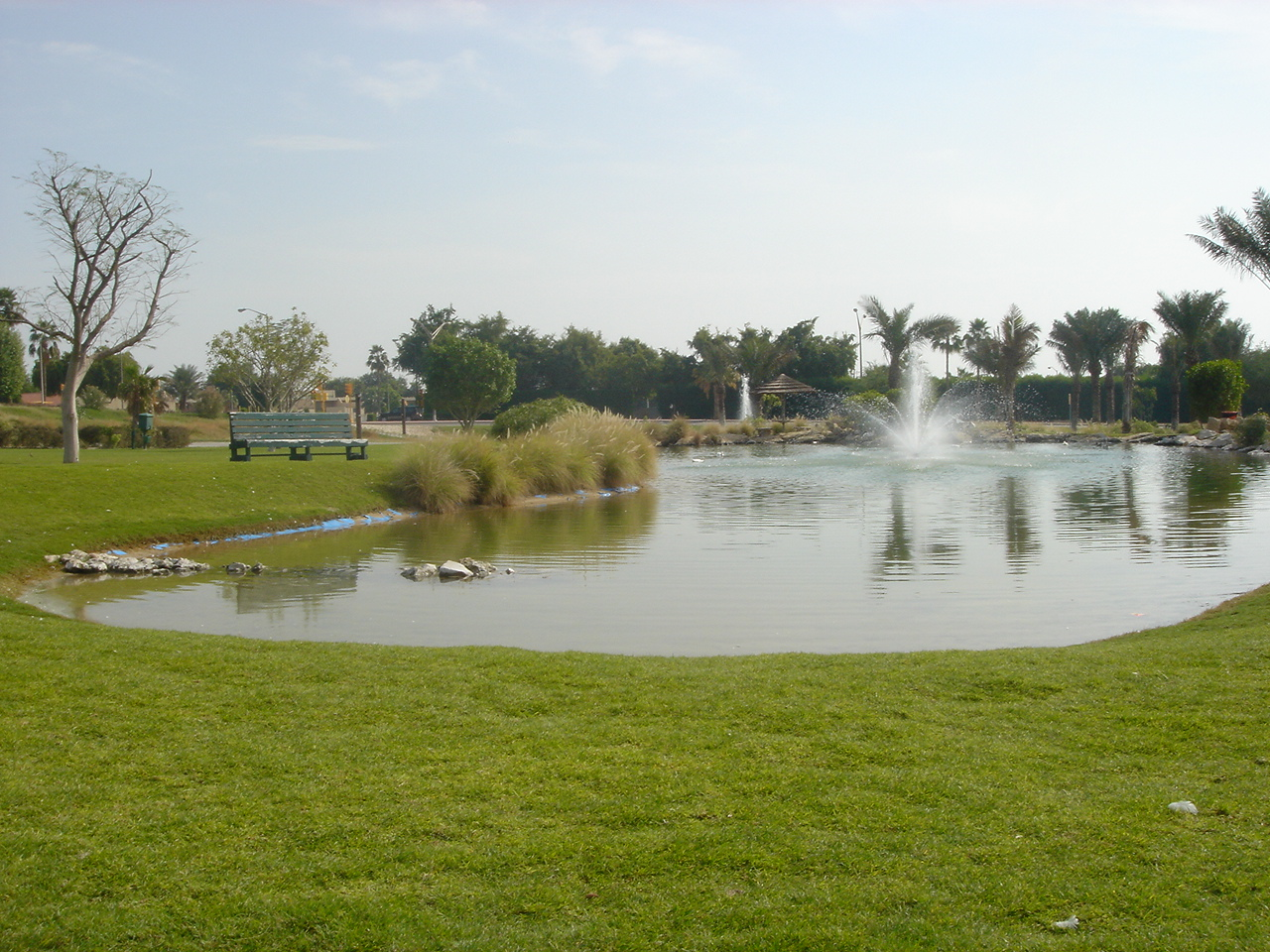
Near golf course, Dhahran Hills

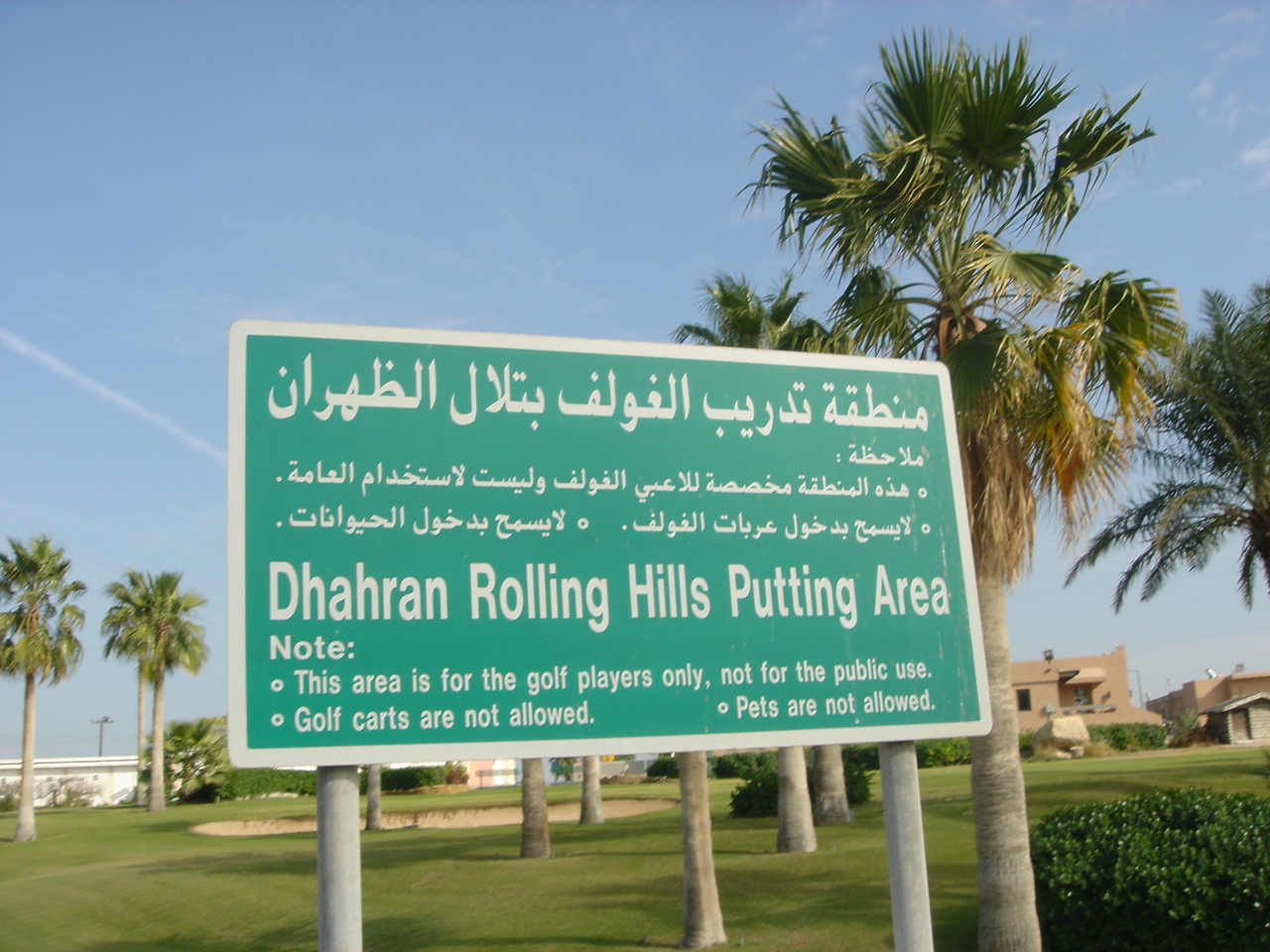
Rolling Hills Putting Area
