= Little League World Series (Mid-Atlantic Region) =

Children's baseball tournament

Mid-Atlantic Region
- Most recent season or competition: 2026 Little League World Series qualification
- Formerly: East Region (1957–2000)
- Sport: Baseball
- Founded: 2001; 25 years ago
- No. of teams: 4
- Country: United States
- Most recent champions: East Side Little League, West Chester, Pennsylvania
- Most titles: Pennsylvania (10); (New York (state)) Mid-Island Little League, Staten Island, New York (2); Council Rock Newtown Little League, Newtown, Pennsylvania (2)
- Website: East Region - Little League

The Mid-Atlantic Region is one of ten United States regions that currently sends teams to the Little League World Series, the largest youth baseball tournament in the world. The Mid-Atlantic Region's participation in the LLWS dates back to 1957, when it was known as the East Region. However, when the LLWS doubled in size from eight to 16 teams in 2001, with the number of US teams expanding from four to eight, the East Region was split into the New England and Mid-Atlantic Regions.

The Mid-Atlantic Region consists of Washington, D.C., and three Mid-Atlantic states:

- Delaware
- Maryland
- Pennsylvania
- Washington, D.C.

Following the 2021 LLWS, New Jersey and New York has been moved to a newly created Metro Region. The latter region is one of the two new U.S. regions to be created as part of a planned expansion of the LLWS from 16 to 20 teams. This expansion was originally scheduled to occur for 2021, but was delayed to 2022 due to the COVID-19 pandemic.

== Regional championship ==
Winner is indicated in green.

=== 2001–2021 ===
| Year | Delaware | Maryland | New Jersey | (New York (state)) New York | Pennsylvania | (Washington, D.C.) Washington, D.C. |
|---|---|---|---|---|---|---|
| 2001 | Midway LL; Wilmington | Easton LL; Easton | Randolph West LL; Randolph | Rolando Paulino LL; Bronx | State College American LL; State College | Capitol City LL |
| 2002 | Lower Sussex LL; Frankford | South Caroline LL; Preston | Nottingham LL; Hamilton Square | Harlem LL; Manhattan | Lehigh LL; Bethlehem | Capitol City LL |
| 2003 | Naamans LL; Wilmington | West Salisbury LL; Salisbury | Freehold Township American LL; Freehold Township | Ramapo LL; Ramapo | Lower Perkiomen LL; Collegeville | Capitol City LL |
| 2004 | Capitol LL; Wilmington | South Caroline LL; Preston | HTRBA LL; Hamilton | Colonie LL; Colonie | Deep Run Valley LL; Hilltown | Capitol City LL |
| 2005 | Canal LL; Bear | Thurmont LL; Thurmont | Toms River American LL; Toms River | Merrick-North Merrick LL; Merrick | Council Rock Newtown LL; Newtown | No tournament (Note: Due to a clerical error by the city's Department of Parks and Recreation, Little League International did not allow Washington, D.C. to have a state tournament, nor an entrant into the regional tournament.) |
| 2006 | Naamans LL; Wilmington | South Caroline LL; Preston | Livingston American LL; Livingston | Mid-Island LL; Staten Island | Butler Township LL; Butler Township | Capitol City LL |
| 2007 | M-O-T LL; Middletown | West Salisbury LL; Salisbury | Randolph East LL; Randolph | Maine-Endwell LL; Endwell | Council Rock Northampton LL; Richboro | Capitol City LL |
| 2008 | M-O-T LL; Middletown | Hagerstown Federal LL; Hagerstown | Bordentown LL; Bordentown | Haverstraw LL; Haverstraw | Devon-Strafford LL; Devon | Capitol City LL |
| 2009 | M-O-T LL; Middletown | Conococheague LL; Williamsport | Somerset Hills LL; Bernardsville | South Shore National LL; Staten Island | Moon Township LL; Moon Township | Northwest Washington LL |
| 2010 | Brandywine LL; Wilmington | Brunswick Railroaders LL; Brunswick | Toms River National LL; Toms River | Stony Point LL; Stony Point | Council Rock Newtown LL; Newtown | Capitol City LL |
| 2011 | Newark National LL; Newark | Conocoheague LL; Williamsport | Paramus LL; Paramus | Great Kills American LL; Staten Island | Keystone LL; Clinton County | Northwest Washington LL |
| 2012 | Newark National LL; Newark | West Salisbury LL; Salisbury | Par Troy East LL; Parsippany | Stony Point LL; Stony Point | Collier Township Athletic Association; Collier | Northwest Washington LL |
| 2013 | Newark National LL; Newark | Berlin LL; Berlin | East Greenwich LL; Clarksboro | Burnt Hills Ballston Lake LL; Glenville | Lionville LL; Lionville | Capitol City LL |
| 2014 | Newark National LL; Newark | West Salisbury LL; Salisbury | Toms River LL; Toms River | Colonie LL; Colonie | Taney Youth Baseball Association LL; Philadelphia | Northwest Washington LL |
| 2015 | M-O-T LL; Middletown | Delmar LL; Delmar | Jackson Township LL; Jackson | Maine-Endwell LL; Maine-Endwell | Red Land LL; Lewisberry | Capitol City LL |
| 2016 | Milton LL; Milton | Hughesville Baseball and Softball LL; Hughesville | Freehold Township LL; Freehold | Maine-Endwell LL; Maine-Endwell | Keystone LL; Clinton County | Capitol City LL |
| 2017 | Milton LL; Milton | Thurmont LL; Thurmont | Holbrook LL; Jackson | Plainview LL; Plainview | Upper Providence LL; Oaks | Northwest Washington LL |
| 2018 | Milton LL; Milton | Berlin LL; Berlin | Middletown LL; Middletown | Mid-Island LL; Staten Island | Keystone LL; Clinton County | Mamie Johnson LL |
| 2019 | Newark National LL; Newark | Fruitland LL; Fruitland | Elmora Youth LL; Elizabeth | Haverstraw LL; Haverstraw | East Pennsboro LL; Enola | Northwest Washington LL |
| 2020 | Not held due to COVID-19 pandemic | | | | | |
| 2021 | Canal LL; Bear | Montgomery County Lower LL; Bethesda | Toms River East LL; Toms River | Colonie LL; Colonie | Upper Providence LL; Oaks | Capitol City LL |

=== 2022–present ===
| Year | Delaware | Maryland | Pennsylvania | (Washington, D.C.) Washington, D.C. |
|---|---|---|---|---|
| 2022 | Naamans LL; Wilmington | Conococheague LL; Williamsport | Hollidaysburg Area Summer Baseball LL; Hollidaysburg | Northwest Washington LL |
| 2023 | M-O-T LL; Middletown | Montgomery County Lower LL; Germantown | Media LL; Media | Northwest Washington LL |
| 2024 | M-O-T LL; Middletown | West Salisbury LL; Salisbury | Council Rock Newtown LL; Newtown | Capitol Hill LL |
| 2025 | M-O-T LL; Middletown | Montgomery County Upper LL; Germantown | Glenmoore Eagle LL; Upper Uwchlan Township | Capitol Hill LL |
| 2026 | Naamans LL; Wilmington | Berlin LL; Berlin | East Side LL; West Chester | Capitol Hill LL |

== LLWS results ==
As of the 2026 Little League World Series.

| Year | Champion | City | LLWS | Record |
|---|---|---|---|---|
| 2001 | Rolando Paulino LL | (New York (state)) Bronx | DQ | DQ |
| 2002 | Harlem LL | (New York (state)) Manhattan | U.S. semifinal | 2–2 |
| 2003 | Naamans LL | (Delaware) Wilmington | Group stage | 1–2 |
| 2004 | South Caroline LL | (Maryland) Preston | U.S. semifinal | 1–3 |
| 2005 | Council Rock LL | (Pennsylvania) Newtown | Group stage | 1–2 |
| 2006 | Mid-Island LL | (New York (state)) Staten Island | Group stage | 0–3 |
| 2007 | West Salisbury LL | (Maryland) Salisbury | Group stage | 0–2 |
| 2008 | Hagerstown Federal LL | (Maryland) Hagerstown | Group stage | 2–1 |
| 2009 | South Shore LL | (New York (state)) Staten Island | U.S. semifinal | 2–2 |
| 2010 | Toms River National LL | (New Jersey) Toms River | Group stage | 1–2 |
| 2011 | Keystone LL | (Pennsylvania) Clinton County | U.S. semifinal | 3–2 |
| 2012 | Par-Troy East LL | (New Jersey) Parsippany | Round 2 | 1–2 |
| 2013 | Newark National LL | (Delaware) Newark | Round 2 | 1–2 |
| 2014 | Taney Youth Baseball Association LL | (Pennsylvania) Philadelphia | U.S. Semifinal | 2–2 |
| 2015 | Red Land LL | (Pennsylvania) Lewisberry | Runner-up | 4–1 |
| 2016 | Maine-Endwell LL | (New York (state)) Maine-Endwell | Champions | 5–0 |
| 2017 | Holbrook LL | (New Jersey) Jackson | Round 3 | 2–2 |
| 2018 | Mid-Island LL | (New York (state)) Staten Island | U.S. semifinal | 2–2 |
| 2019 | Elmora Youth LL | (New Jersey) Elizabeth | Round 3 | 2–2 |
| 2020 | LLWS not held due to COVID-19 pandemic | | | |
| 2021 (Note: Due to the COVID-19 pandemic, Little League International did not invite teams from outside the U.S. to the LLWS in 2021. Instead, the top two teams in each U.S. region qualified.) | Upper Providence LL | (Pennsylvania) Oaks | Round 1 | 0–2 |
| 2021 | Toms River East LL | (New Jersey) Toms River | Round 2 | 1–2 |
| 2022 | Hollidaysburg Area Summer Baseball LL | (Pennsylvania) Hollidaysburg | Round 4 | 3–2 |
| 2023 | Media LL | (Pennsylvania) Media | Round 2 | 1–2 |
| 2024 | Council Rock Newtown LL | (Pennsylvania) Newtown | Round 3 | 2–2 |
| 2025 | Glenmoore Eagle LL | (Pennsylvania) Upper Uwchlan Township | Round 1 | 0–2 |
| 2026 | East Side LL | (Pennsylvania) West Chester | Round 2 | 0–2 |

=== Results by state ===
As of the 2026 Little League World Series. Italics indicates the state is no longer a member of the Mid-Atlantic Region.

| State | Mid-Atlantic Championships | LLWS Championships | Record in LLWS | PCT |
|---|---|---|---|---|
| Pennsylvania | 10 | 0 | 16–19 | .457 |
| (New York (state)) New York | 6 | 1 | 11–9 | .550 |
| New Jersey | 4 | 0 | 7–10 | .412 |
| Maryland | 3 | 0 | 3–6 | .333 |
| Delaware | 2 | 0 | 2–4 | .333 |
| (Washington, D.C.) Washington, D.C. | 0 | 0 | 0–0 | – |
| Total | 25 | 1 | 39–48 | .448 |

== See also ==
- Little League World Series (East Region)
- Little League World Series (New England Region)

East Region in other Little League divisions

- Intermediate League
- Junior League
- Senior League
- Big League
