= Little League World Series (Asia-Pacific and Middle East Region) =

Children's baseball tournament

Asia–Pacific and Middle East Region
- Most recent season or competition: 2026 Little League World Series qualification
- Formerly: Far East Region
- Sport: Baseball
- Founded: 2001; 25 years ago
- No. of teams: 17
- Country: International
- Most recent champions: West Seoul (B) Little League; Seoul, South Korea
- Most titles: (Chinese Taipei) Kuei-Shan Little League, Taoyuan, Taiwan (4)

The Asia–Pacific and Middle East Region is a region that competes in the Little League World Series. Asian teams first competed in the LLWS in 1961, when Japanese teams competed in the original Pacific Region (which included Hawaii). In 1962, Japanese teams began competing in the newly created Far East Region.

In 2001, the Little League World Series was expanded to sixteen teams, and East Asia was split into two regions – the Pacific (consisting of teams from the Pacific Islands, Indonesia, and Oceania) and Asia (consisting of teams from mainland Asia, Chinese Taipei, and Japan). In 2007, the regions were reconfigured. Japan was given its own automatic berth in the Series, while the remaining Asian teams merged with the Pacific teams to create the Asia-Pacific Region.

In 2013, the region was reorganized as the Asia-Pacific and Middle East Region. Australia, now the fourth-largest country and the largest outside North America in Little League participation, received its own LLWS region. All Middle Eastern countries with Little League programs, except for Israel and Turkey, were placed in the former Asia-Pacific Region. Previously, the Middle East had formed a region with Africa, but that region was disbanded, with African teams joining the Europe and Africa Region (formerly Europe Region, which also includes Israel and Turkey).

As of 2026, the countries in the region are:

- American Samoa
- China
- Chinese Taipei (Note: In 1949, the Republic of China government led by the Kuomintang (KMT) lost the Chinese Civil War to the Chinese Communist Party (CCP), retreated to Taiwan, and set up a provisional capital in Taipei, which serves as the seat of government to this day. The CCP established the People's Republic. As such, the political status of the ROC and the legal status of Taiwan (alongside the territories currently under ROC jurisdiction) are in dispute. In 1971, the United Nations gave its China seat to the PRC instead of the ROC: most states recognize the PRC to be the sole legitimate representative of all China, and the UN classifies Taiwan as "Taiwan, Province of China". The ROC has de facto relations with most sovereign states. A significant political movement within Taiwan advocates Taiwan independence. Due to PRC pressure, the ROC participates in the LLWS events under the name "Chinese Taipei" instead of its official name "Republic of China" or as "Taiwan".)
- Guam
- Hong Kong
- India
- Indonesia
- New Zealand
- Northern Mariana Islands
- Philippines
- Qatar
- Saudi Arabia
- Singapore
- South Korea
- Thailand
- United Arab Emirates
- Vietnam

== History of the region ==
=== Asia Region (2001–2006) ===
In 2001, the Far East Region split into the Asia and Pacific regions. The Asia Region comprised Little Leagues from mainland Asia, Chinese Taipei, and Japan.

==== Asia Regional Championship ====
The list below lists each country's participant in the Asia Region Tournament between 2001 and 2006. Each year's winner is indicated in green. Two teams from the Asia Region won the Little League World Series — Tokyo in 2001 and 2003.

Year	China	Chinese Taipei	Hong Kong, China	Japan	South Korea	Thailand
2001	–	–	N/A; Hong Kong, China	Kitasuna LL; Tokyo	N/A; South Korea	–
2002	–	–	N/A; Hong Kong SAR, China	Sendai Higashi LL; Sendai	N/A; South Korea	–
2003	–	N/A; Chinese Taipei	N/A; Hong Kong SAR, China	Musashi-Fuchu LL; Tokyo	N/A; South Korea	–
2004	–	Shou-Tien LL; Kaohsiung	Hong Kong LL; Hong Kong SAR, China	Sendai Higashi LL; Sendai	N/A; South Korea	–
2005	–	N/A; Chinese Taipei	N/A; Hong Kong SAR, China	Chiba City LL; Chiba City	N/A; South Korea	N/A; Thailand
2006	Huangpu LL; Guangzhou	Fong-Nien LL; Taitung City	Hong Kong LL; Causeway Bay	Kawaguchi LL; Kawaguchi City	N/A; South Korea	Sanuk LL; Chiang Mai

==== LLWS results ====
Year	Champion	City	LLWS	Record
2001	Kitasuna LL	(Japan) Tokyo	Champion	5–1
2002	Sendai Hagashi LL	(Japan) Sendai	Runner-up	5–1
2003	Musashi-Fuchu LL	(Japan) Tokyo	Champion	6–0
2004	Shou-Tien LL	(Chinese Taipei) Kaohsiung	Int'l Semifinal	2–2
2005	Chiba City LL	(Japan) Chiba City	4th place	4–2
2006	Kawaguchi City LL	(Japan) Kawaguchi, Saitama	Runner-up	5–1

=== Pacific Region (2001–2006) ===
In 2001, the Far East Region split into the Asia and Pacific regions. The list below lists each country's participant in the Pacific Region Tournament between 2001 and 2006. Each year's winner is indicated in green. No team from the Pacific Region won the World Series.

==== Pacific Regional Championship ====
Year	Guam	Indonesia	New Zealand	Northern Mariana Islands	Philippines
2001	Central LL; Agana	N/A; Indonesia	N/A; New Zealand	Saipan LL; Saipan	N/A; Philippines
2002	Central; Agana	N/A; Indonesia	N/A; New Zealand	Saipan ll Saipan	N/A; Philippines
2003	Central LL; Agana	N/A; Indonesia	–	Saipan LL; Saipan	N/A; Philippines
2004	Central East LL; Mangilao	Jakarta LL; Jakarta	–	Saipan LL; Northern Mariana Islands	N/A; Philippines
2005	Central East LL; Mangilao	N/A; Indonesia	N/A; New Zealand	Saipan LL; Northern Mariana Islands	N/A; Philippines
2006	Central East LL; Mangilao	Jakarta LL; Jakarta	Bayside Westhaven LL; Auckland	Saipan LL; Northern Mariana Islands	Illam Central LL; Makati City

==== LLWS results ====
Year	Champion	City	LLWS	Record
2001	Central LL	(Guam) Agana	Int'l Semifinal	3–1
2002	Central LL	(Guam) Agana	Int'l Semifinal	2–2
2003	Central LL	(Guam) Agana	Group Stage	0–3
2004	Saipan LL	(Northern Mariana Islands) Saipan	Group Stage	0–3
2005	Central East LL	(Guam) Mangilao-Barrigada	Int'l Semifinal	3–1
2006	Saipan LL	(Northern Mariana Islands) Saipan	Group Stage	0–3

=== Asia-Pacific Region (2007–2012) ===
In 2007, the Asia and Pacific regions were reconfigured again. Japan was given its own place in the LLWS and the remaining Asian and Pacific teams were merged into one region. No Asia-Pacific team won the World Series, although Kuei-Shan Little League of Chinese Taipei finished runner-up in 2009.

==== Asia-Pacific Regional Championship ====
The list below lists each country's participant in the Asia-Pacific Little League Region Tournament between 2007 and 2012. That year's winner is indicated in green.

Year	Australia	China	Chinese Taipei	Guam	Hong Kong, China	India	Indonesia	New Zealand	Northern Mariana Islands	Philippines	Singapore	South Korea	Thailand	Vietnam
2007	–	–	Li-Shing LL; Taichung	Northern LL; Dededo	Hong Kong LL; Hong Kong	–	Jakarta LL; Jakarta	Bayside Westhaven LL; Auckland	Saipan LL; Saipan	Illam Central LL; Makati City	–	Nam Yang Ju Shi LL; Nam Yang Ju Shi	Sanuk LL; Chiang Mai	–
2008	Hills LL; Sydney	Guangzhou LL; Guangzhou	Tung Yuan LL; Wan-Hua	Southern LL; Yona	Hong Kong LL; Hong Kong	BB & SB Confederation of India LL; New Delhi	Jakarta LL; Jakarta	Bayside Westhaven LL; Auckland	Saipan LL; Saipan	Tanauan LL; Batangas	–	Gyeonggi LL; Gyeonggi-do	Sanuk LL; Chiang Mai	–
2009	Waverley LL; Victoria	–	Kuei-Shan LL; Taoyuan City	Central LL; Agana	Hong Kong LL; Hong Kong	–	Indonesian LL; Jakarta	Auckland Baseball Association LL; Auckland	Saipan LL; Saipan	Illam Central LL; Makati City	Singapore LL; Singapore	Seoul LL; Seoul	Sanuk LL; Chiang Mai	–
2010	–	–	Fu-Hsing LL; Kaohsiung	Northern LL; Dededo	Hong Kong LL; Hong Kong	–	Indonesian LL; Jakarta	N/A; New Zealand	–	Illam Central LL; Makati City	Singapore LL; Singapore	Seoul LL; Seoul	Sanuk LL; Chiang Mai	Hanoi LL; Hanoi
2011	Southern Adelaide Districts LL; Adelaide	–	Ching-Tang LL; Kaohsiung	Central LL; Agana	Hong Kong LL; Hong Kong	–	Indonesian LL; Jakarta	Bayside Westhaven; Auckland	Saipan LL; Saipan	Illam Central LL; Makati City	Singapore LL; Singapore	N/A; South Korea	Sanuk LL; Chiang Mai	–
2012	Perth Metro North LL; Perth	–	Kuei-Shan LL; Taoyuan City	Central LL; Agana	Hong Kong LL; Hong Kong	–	Indonesian LL; Jakarta	Oakland; N/A	Saipan LL; Saipan	Illam Central LL; Makati City	–	Busan LL; South Korea	Bangkok LL; Bangkok	–

==== LLWS results ====
Year	Champion	City	LLWS	Record
2007	Li-Shing LL	(Chinese Taipei) Taichung	Int'l Semifinal	2–2
2008	Southern LL	(Guam) Yona	Group Stage	1–2
2009	Kuei-Shan LL	(Chinese Taipei) Taoyuan	Runner-up	4–2
2010	Fu-Hsing LL	(Chinese Taipei) Kaohsiung	3rd place	4–1
2011	Ching-Tang LL	(Chinese Taipei) Kaohsiung	Round 2	1–2
2012	Kuei-Shan LL	(Chinese Taipei) Taoyuan	Round 2	1–2

=== Asia-Pacific and Middle East Region (2013–present) ===
The region was reconfigured in 2013, with the spin-off of Australia into its own LLWS region and the addition of Middle Eastern countries. As of 2025, one Asia-Pacific and Middle East team has won the Little League World Series — Seoul in 2014.

The list below lists each country's participant in the Asia-Pacific Little League Region Tournament from 2013 to present. That year's winner is indicated in green. There was no Asia-Pacific and Middle East Region Tournament for 2020 and 2021 as a result of the COVID-19 pandemic.

Year	American Samoa	China	Chinese Taipei	Guam	Hong Kong, China	India	Indonesia	New Zealand	Northern Mariana Islands	Philippines	Qatar	Saudi Arabia	Singapore	South Korea	Thailand	United Arab Emirates	Vietnam
2013	–	–	Chung-Ping LL; Taoyuan City	N/A; Guam	Hong Kong LL; Hong Kong	–	Indonesian LL; Jakarta	Bayside Westhaven LL; Auckland	Saipan LL; Saipan	Tanauan City LL; Tanauan	–	Arabian American LL; Dhahran	Singapore LL; Singapore	N/A; South Korea	N/A; Thailand	Dubai LL; Dubai	–
2014	–	–	N/A; Chinese Taipei	N/A; Guam	N/A; Hong Kong	–	Jakarta LL; Jakarta	N/A; New Zealand	N/A; Northern Mariana Islands	N/A; Philippines	–	Arabian American LL; Dhahran	–	Seoul LL; Seoul	–	Dubai LL; Dubai	Hanoi LL; Hanoi
2015	–	Guangzhou LL; Guangzhou	Tung Yuan LL; Taipei	N/A; Hagåtña	Hong Kong LL; Hong Kong	–	N/A; Jakarta	–	Saipan LL; Saipan	Illam Central LL; Makati City	–	Arabian American LL; Dhahran	–	East Seoul LL; Seoul	N/A; Bangkok	–	–
2016	–	N/A; China	N/A; Chinese Taipei	N/A; Guam	N/A; Hong Kong	N/A; India	–	–	N/A; Northern Mariana Islands	N/A; Philippines	–	N/A; Saudi Arabia	–	East Seoul LL; Seoul	N/A; Thailand	N/A; United Arab Emirates	–
2017	–	–	N/A; Chinese Taipei	N/A; Guam	N/A; Hong Kong	–	N/A; Indonesia	–	N/A; Northern Mariana Islands	N/A; Philippines	–	N/A; Saudi Arabia	–	Seoul West LL; Seoul	N/A; Thailand	–	–
2018	–	N/A; China	N/A; Chinese Taipei	N/A; Guam	N/A; Hong Kong	–	N/A; Indonesia	N/A; New Zealand	N/A; Northern Mariana Islands	N/A; Philippines	–	–	–	South Seoul LL; Seoul	N/A; Thailand	–	–
2019	–	N/A; China	N/A; Chinese Taipei	N/A; Guam	N/A; Hong Kong	–	N/A; Indonesia	N/A; New Zealand	N/A; Northern Mariana Islands	N/A; Philippines	–	–	–	Chung Nam (B) LL; South Chungcheong	N/A; Thailand	–	N/A; Vietnam
2022	–	–	Fu-Lin LL; Taipei	Guam LL; Guam	N/A; Hong Kong	–	–	N/A; New Zealand	–	N/A; Philippines	–	–	–	N/A; South Korea	–	–	–
2023	–	N/A; China	Kuei-Shan LL; Taoyuan City	N/A; Guam	–	–	N/A; Indonesia	N/A; New Zealand	–	N/A; Philippines	N/A; Qatar	–	–	N/A; South Korea	–	–	–
2024	–	N/A; China	Kuei-Shan LL; Taoyuan City	N/A; Guam	N/A; Hong Kong	–	N/A; Indonesia	N/A; New Zealand	–	N/A; Philippines	–	–	–	N/A; South Korea	N/A; Thailand	–	–
2025	N/A; American Samoa	N/A; China	Tung-Yuan LL; Taipei	N/A; Guam	N/A; Hong Kong	–	N/A; Indonesia	N/A; New Zealand	N/A; Northern Mariana Islands	N/A; Philippines	–	N/A; Saudi Arabia	–	North Seoul B LL; Seoul	N/A; Thailand	–	–
2026	–	Shenzhen Bay Area LL; Shenzhen	Hung-Yeh LL; Yanping Township	Guam District 1 LL; Hagåtña	Hong Kong LL; Hong Kong	–	Indonesian LL; Bogor	Auckland Baseball Association LL; Auckland	Saipan LL; Saipan	Tanauan LL; Tanauan	–	Dhahran LL; Dhahran	–	West Seoul (B) LL; Seoul	Sanuk LL; Bangkok	–	–

==== LLWS results ====
Year	Champion	City	LLWS	Record
2013	Chung-Ping LL	(Chinese Taipei) Taoyuan	Round 3	2–2
2014	Seoul LL	(South Korea) Seoul	Champions	5–0
2015	Tung Yuan LL	(Chinese Taipei) Taipei	Round 3	2–2
2016	East Seoul LL	(South Korea) Seoul	Runner-up	4–2
2017	Seoul West LL	(South Korea) Seoul	Round 2	1–2
2018	South Seoul LL	(South Korea) Seoul	Runner-up	4–1
2019	Chung Nam (B) LL	(South Korea) South Chungcheong	Int'l Semifinal	2–2
2020	Cancelled due to COVID-19 pandemic			
2021	No international participant			
2022	Fu-Lin LL	(Chinese Taipei) Taipei	3rd place	4–1
2023	Kuei-Shan LL	(Chinese Taipei) Taoyuan	3rd place	4–1
2024	Kuei-Shan LL	(Chinese Taipei) Taoyuan	Runner-up	5–1
2025	Tung-Yuan LL	(Chinese Taipei) Taipei	Champions	5–0
2026	West Seoul (B) LL	(South Korea) Seoul	Round 3	2–2

== LLWS results by country ==
The following table lists each Asia-Pacific country's record in the Little League World Series. Italics indicates team is no longer in the region. Table includes results for teams that qualified for either the Asia, Pacific, or Asia-Pacific regional LLWS berth through the 2026 Little League World Series.

Country	Asia-Pacific Championships	LLWS Championships	Record in LLWS	PCT
Chinese Taipei	12	1	36–18	.667
South Korea	6	1	18–9	.667
Japan	5	2	25–5	.833
Guam	5	0	9–9	.500
Northern Mariana Islands	2	0	0–6	.000
Total	30	4	88–47	.652

== See also ==
- Little League World Series (Far East Region)
- Little League World Series in Japan

Asia-Pacific Region in other Little League divisions

- Intermediate League
- Junior League
- Senior League
- Big League

Philippine Series

- 2008 Little League Philippine Series
- 2009 Little League Philippine Series
