= 2007 Little League World Series qualification =

Children's baseball competition qualification

United States
- Great Lakes winner: Hamilton, Ohio
- Mid-Atlantic winner: Salisbury, Maryland
- Midwest winner: Coon Rapids, Minnesota
- New England winner: Walpole, Massachusetts
- Northwest winner: Lake Oswego, Oregon
- Southeast winner: (Georgia (U.S. state)) Warner Robins, Georgia
- Southwest winner: Lubbock, Texas
- West winner: Chandler, Arizona

International
- Asia-Pacific winner: Taichung, Taiwan
- Canada winner: (Canada) Surrey, British Columbia
- Caribbean winner: Willemstad, Curaçao
- Europe, Middle East & Africa winner: Apeldoorn, Netherlands
- Japan winner: (Japan) Tokyo
- Latin America winner: Maracaibo, Venezuela
- Mexico winner: (Mexico) Mexicali, Baja California
- Transatlantic winner: Dhahran, Saudi Arabia

Tournaments

Qualification for the 2007 Little League World Series took place in eight United States regions and eight international regions in July and August 2007.

One change from the 2006 Qualification is the configuration of the Asia-Pacific region. Japan was detached from the Asia region to form its own region and the remainder of the Asia region was added to the Pacific region to form the new Asia-Pacific region.

== United States ==
=== Great Lakes ===
The tournament took place in Indianapolis, Indiana from August 2–11.

State	City	LL Organization	Record
Ohio	Hamilton	West Side	4–0
Illinois	Western Springs	Western Springs	4–0
Indiana	New Albany	New Albany	2–2
Kentucky	Bowling Green	Warren County Southern	2-2
Michigan	Taylor	Taylor Northwest	0–4
Wisconsin	Wausau	Wausau Northern	0–4

Semi-finals
August 9 – Indianapolis
3 Indiana	5
2 Illinois	4
August 9 – Indianapolis
1 Ohio	13
4 Kentucky	2

Final
August 11 – Indianapolis
3 Indiana	1
1 Ohio	6

=== Mid-Atlantic ===
The tournament took place in Bristol, Connecticut from August 3–13.

State	City	LL Organization	Record
New York	Endwell	Maine-Endwell	4–0
New Jersey	Randolph	Randolph East	3–1
Pennsylvania	Richboro	Council Rock Northampton	3–1
Maryland	Salisbury	West Salisbury	1–3
Washington, D.C.		Capitol City	1–3
Delaware	Middletown	M-O-T	0–4

Semi-finals
August 12 – Bristol (7 innings)
3 Pennsylvania	6
2 New Jersey	4
August 12 – Bristol
4 Maryland	11
1 (New York (state)) New York	10

Final
August 13 – Bristol
3 Pennsylvania	0
4 Maryland	4

=== Midwest ===
The tournament took place in Indianapolis, Indiana from August 3–11.

Note: The Dakotas are organized into a single Little League district.

State	City	LL Organization	Record
Minnesota	Coon Rapids	Coon Rapids National	3–1
South Dakota	Rapid City	Harney	3–1
Iowa	Urbandale	Urbandale	3–1
Nebraska	Omaha	Keystone	2–2
Missouri	Carthage	Carthage	1–3
Kansas	Cherokee	Cherokee Community	0–4

Semi-finals
August 9 – Indianapolis
3 Iowa	15
2 South Dakota	16
August 9 – Indianapolis
4 Nebraska	3
1 Minnesota	7

Final
August 11 – Indianapolis
2 South Dakota	8
1 Minnesota	17

=== New England ===
The tournament took place in Bristol, Connecticut from August 3–13.

State	City	LL Organization	Record
Connecticut	Shelton	Shelton National	3–1
New Hampshire	Portsmouth	Portsmouth	3–1
Massachusetts	Walpole	Walpole American	3–1
Maine	Portland	Portland North	2–2
Rhode Island	Cranston	Cranston Western	1–3
Vermont	Essex Junction	Essex Junction	0–4

Semi-finals
August 9 – Bristol
3 Massachusetts	4
2 New Hampshire	1
August 9 – Bristol
1 Connecticut	6
4 Maine	0

Final
August 11 – Bristol
3 Massachusetts	14
1 Connecticut	4

=== Northwest ===
The tournament took place in San Bernardino, California from August 4–12.

State	City	LL Organization	Record
Washington	Kent	Kent	4–0
Idaho	Boise	North Boise	2–2
Oregon	Lake Oswego	Lake Oswego	2–2
Montana	Missoula	Missoula Southside	2–2
Alaska	Anchorage	Dimond-West	2–2
Wyoming	Laramie	Laramie	0–4

Semi-finals
August 10 – San Bernardino
3 Oregon	16
2 Idaho	8
August 10 – San Bernardino
4 Montana	0
1 (Washington (state)) Washington	16

Final
August 12 – San Bernardino
3 Oregon	6
1 (Washington (state)) Washington	2

=== Southeast ===
The tournament took place in St. Petersburg, Florida from August 4–9.

Pool A
State	City	LL Organization	Record
Florida	North Palm Beach	North Palm Beach	3–0
Virginia	Centreville	SYA East	2–1
West Virginia	Inwood	South Berkeley	1–2
North Carolina	Durham	North Durham	0–3

Pool B
State	City	LL Organization	Record
Georgia	Warner Robins	Warner Robins American	3–0
Alabama	Mobile	Westside	2–1
Tennessee	Tullahoma	Tullahoma American	1–2
South Carolina	Piedmont	Wren	0–3

Semi-finals
August 7 – St. Petersburg
2B Alabama	6
1A Florida	2
August 7 – St. Petersburg
2A Virginia	2
1B (Georgia (U.S. state)) Georgia	3

Final
August 9 – St. Petersburg
2B Alabama	9
1B (Georgia (U.S. state)) Georgia	10

=== Southwest ===
The tournament took place in Waco, Texas from August 4–10.

Pool A
State	City	LL Organization	Record
Texas West	Lubbock	Lubbock Western	3–0
Louisiana	Lafayette	Lafayette	2–1
Texas East	Tomball	Tomball	1–2
Colorado	Grand Junction	Monument	0–3

Pool B
State	City	LL Organization	Record
New Mexico	Roswell	Noon Optimist	3–0
Arkansas	Benton	Benton	2–1
Mississippi	Ocean Springs	Ocean Springs	1–2
Oklahoma	Tulsa	Tulsa National	0–3

Semi-finals
August 8 – Waco
A1 Texas West	15
B2 Arkansas	3
August 8 – Waco
A2 Louisiana	5
B1 New Mexico	7

Final
August 10 – Waco
A1 Texas West	6
B1 New Mexico	0

=== West ===
The tournament took place in San Bernardino, California from August 3–11.

State	City	LL Organization	Record
Arizona	Chandler	Chandler National	4–0
Nevada	Henderson	Green Valley	3–1
Southern California	Solana Beach	Solana Beach	3–1
Hawaii	Waipahu	Waipio	1–3
Northern California	San Jose	Moreland District	1–3
Utah	Santa Clara	Snow Canyon	0–4

Semi-finals
August 9 – San Bernardino
2 Nevada	2
3 Southern California	3
August 9 – San Bernardino
4 Hawaii	1
1 Arizona	8

Final
August 11 – San Bernardino
3 Southern California	3
1 Arizona	7

== International ==
=== Asia-Pacific ===
The tournament took place in Hong Kong from July 8–14.

Asia
Country	City	LL Organization	Record
Taiwan	Taichung	Li-Shing	3–0
Hong Kong		Hong Kong	2–1
South Korea	Namyangju	Namyangju	1–2
Thailand	Chiang Mai	Sanuk	0–3

Pacific
Country	City	LL Organization	Record
Northern Mariana Islands	Saipan	Saipan	4–0
Philippines	Makati	Illam Central	3–1
Guam	Dededo	Northern	1–3
Indonesia	Jakarta	Jakarta	1–3
New Zealand	Auckland	Bayside Westhaven	1–3

Third Place
July 14 – Hong Kong
Philippines	2
Hong Kong	9

Final
July 14 – Hong Kong
Taiwan	12
(Northern Mariana Islands) Saipan	0

=== Canada ===
The tournament took place in Regina, Saskatchewan from August 4–11.

Province	City	LL Organization	Record
British Columbia	Surrey	White Rock-South Surrey	5–0
Alberta	Calgary	Calgary West	3–2
Saskatchewan	Regina	Regina National	3–2
Ontario	Brockville	Brockville	3–2
Nova Scotia	Sydney Mines	Sydney Mines and District	1–4
Quebec	Rouyn-Noranda	Rouyn-Noranda	0–5

Semi-finals
August 10 – Regina
3 Saskatchewan	3
2 Alberta	8
August 10 – Regina
4 Ontario	0
1 British Columbia	10

Final
August 11– Regina
2 Alberta	4
1 British Columbia	14

=== Caribbean ===
The tournament took place in Yabucoa, Puerto Rico from July 21–28.

Pool A
Country	City	LL Organization	Record
Curaçao	Willemstad	Pabao	3–0
Puerto Rico A	Yabucoa	Juan A. Biblioni	2–1
Aruba	Oranjestad	Aruba North	1–2
Sint Maarten	Philipsburg	Sint Maarten	0–3

Pool B
Country	City	LL Organization	Record
Puerto Rico B	Yauco	Tati Lugo	3–0
U.S. Virgin Islands	St. Croix	Elmo Plaskett West	2–1
Netherlands Antilles	Bonaire	Bonaire	1–2
Jamaica	Buff Bay	Bayside	0–3

Quarter finals – July 24
A2	Puerto Rico A	6
B3	(Netherlands Antilles) Bonaire	3
B2	(United States Virgin Islands) U.S. Virgin Islands	8
A3	Aruba	10

Semi finals – July 26
QF1	Puerto Rico A	4
B1	Puerto Rico B	7
QF2	Aruba	3
A1	Curaçao	7

Final – July 28
SF1	Puerto Rico B	0
SF2	Curaçao	3
Third place
QF1	Puerto Rico A	7
QF2	Aruba	4

=== Europe, Middle East and Africa ===
The tournament took place in Kutno, Poland from August 1–8.

Pool A
Country	City	LL Organization	Record
Poland	Osielsko	Dęby Osielsko	4–0
Belarus	Brest	Brest Zubrs	3–1
Italy	Lazio	Lazio	2–2
Ukraine	Illichivsk	Illichivsk	1–3
Sweden	Tranås	Ostsvenska	0–4

Pool B
Country	City	LL Organization	Record
Netherlands	Apeldoorn	Windmills	5–0
Germany	Friedberg	Hessen	3–2
Bulgaria	Doupnitza	Doupnitza	2–3
Austria	Vienna	AIBC	2–3
Lithuania	Vilnius	Vilnius	2–3
Moldova	Tiraspol	Kvint	1–4

Quarterfinals – August 6
A2	Belarus	0
B3	Bulgaria	1
B2	Germany	1
A3	Italy	5

Semifinals – August 7
QF1	Bulgaria	5
B1	Netherlands	13
QF2	Italy	7
A1	Poland	2

Final – August 8
SF1	Netherlands	7
SF2	Italy	0
Third place
QF1	Bulgaria	4
QF2	Poland	1

=== Japan ===
The first two rounds of the tournament were held on July 7, and the remaining two rounds were played on July 21. All games were played in Tokyo.

Round of 16
July 7 - Tokyo
Kobe North	11
(Nagano Prefecture) Matsumoto South	10
July 7 - Tokyo
(Tokyo) Musashi Fuchū	15
(Ehime Prefecture) Ehime Tobe	6
July 7 - Tokyo
(Gifu Prefecture) Gifu Tohno	2
Tokyo Kitasuna	6
July 7 - Tokyo
(Aomori Prefecture) Hachinohe Aomori	8
(Kumamoto Prefecture) Ushibuka	6
July 7 - Tokyo
(Saitama Prefecture) Kawaguchi	3
(Chita, Zabaykalsky Krai) Chita	1
July 7 - Tokyo
(Chiba Prefecture) Funabashi	2
(Iwate Prefecture) Mizusawa	0
July 7 - Tokyo
(Hiroshima Prefecture) Hiroshima Nishi	1
Sapporo Toyohira	0
July 7 - Tokyo
(Kanagawa Prefecture) Hiratsuka	7
(Hyōgo Prefecture) Takarazuka	6

Quarter-finals
July 7 - Tokyo
Kobe North	2
(Tokyo) Musashi Fushu	7
July 7 - Tokyo
Tokyo Kitasuna	39
(Aomori Prefecture) Hachinohe Aomori	2
July 7 - Tokyo
(Saitama Prefecture) Kawaguchi	2
(Chiba Prefecture) Funabashi	0
July 7 - Tokyo
(Hiroshima Prefecture) Hiroshima Nishi	0
(Kanagawa Prefecture) Hiratsuka	11

Semi-finals
July 14 – Tokyo
(Tokyo) Musashi Fushu	2
Tokyo Kitasuna	4
July 14 - Tokyo
(Saitama Prefecture) Kawaguchi	1
(Kanagawa Prefecture) Hiratsuka	10

Final
July 21 – Tokyo
Tokyo Kitasuna	6
(Kanagawa Prefecture) Hiratsuka	5

=== Latin America ===
The tournament took place Panama City, Panama on July 8–14.

Country	City	LL Organization	Record
Venezuela	Maracaibo	La Victoria	5–1
Guatemala	Guatemala City	Liga Pequena Javier de Baseball	5–1
Panama	Puerto Armuelles	Baru	4–2
Panama	Aguadulce	Aguadulce Cabezera	3–3
Nicaragua	Chinandega	Chinandega	3–3
Colombia	Providence Island	Providencia	1–5
Costa Rica	Santo Domingo de Heredia	Santo Domingo de Heredia	0–6

Semi-finals
July 13 – Panama City
Venezuela	2
Panama (Aguadulce)	1
July 13 – Panama City
Panama (Puerto Armuelles)	2
Guatemala	5

Final
July 14 – Panama City
Venezuela	6
Guatemala	0

=== Mexico ===
The tournament took place in Mexico City from July 13–22.

==== Phase 1 ====
Pool A
City	LL Organization	Record
(Mexico City) México, D.F.	Olmeca	5–0
Guadalupe, Nuevo León	Linda Vista	3–2
Saltillo, Coahuila	Saraperos	3–2
(Chihuahua (state)) Juárez, Chihuahua	Satellite	2–3
Matamoros, Tamaulipas	Matamoros	1–4
Los Mochis, Sinaloa	Teodoro Higuera	1–4

Pool B
City	LL Organization	Record
Mexicali, Baja California	Seguro Social	5–0
Caydereta, Nuevo León	Caydereta	3–2
Boca del Río, Veracruz	Beto Ávila	3–2
Nuevo Laredo, Tamaulipas	Oriente	2–3
Guadalajara, Jalisco	Guadalajara SUTAJ	1–4
(Chihuahua (state)) Delicias, Chihuahua	A Curo Trillo	1–4

==== Phase 2 ====
City	LL Organization	Record
Saltillo, Coahuila	Saraperos	5–0
(Mexico City) México, D.F.	Olmeca	3–2
Mexicali, Baja California	Seguro Social	3–2
Boca del Río, Veracruz	Beto Avila	2–3
Caydereta, Nuevo León	Caydereta	1–4
Guadalupe, Nuevo León	Linda Vista	1–4

==== Phase 3 ====
Semi-finals
July 21 – Mexico City
(Coahuila) Saltillo	3
(Veracruz) Boca del Río	5
July 21 – Mexico City
(Baja California) Mexicali	7
(Mexico City) México, D.F.	4

Final
July 22 – Mexico City
(Veracruz) Boca del Río	0
(Baja California) Mexicali	11

=== Transatlantic ===
The tournament took place in Kutno, Poland from July 23–29.

Country	City	LL Organization	Record
Saudi Arabia	Dhahran	Arabian American	4–0
Germany	Stuttgart	Stuttgart American	3–1
England	London	London Area Youth	2–2
United Arab Emirates	Dubai	Dubai American	1–3
Italy	Naples	Naples	0–4

Semi-finals
July 28 – Kutno
Saudi Arabia	6
United Arab Emirates	0
July 28 – Kutno
Germany	6
England	9

Final
July 29 – Kutno
Saudi Arabia	7
England	1
