= 2002 Little League World Series qualification =

Children's baseball tournament qualification

United States
- Great Lakes winner: Louisville, Kentucky
- Mid-Atlantic winner: (New York (state)) Manhattan, New York
- Midwest winner: Webb City, Missouri
- New England winner: Worcester, Massachusetts
- Northwest winner: Waipahu, Hawaii
- Southeast winner: Clemmons, North Carolina
- Southwest winner: Fort Worth, Texas
- West winner: Aptos, California

International
- Asia winner: Sendai, Japan
- Canada winner: (Canada) Regina, Saskatchewan
- Caribbean winner: Willemstad, Curaçao
- Europe, Middle East & Africa winner: Moscow, Russia
- Latin America winner: Valencia, Venezuela
- Mexico winner: Monterrey, Mexico
- Pacific winner: Hagåtña, Guam
- Transatlantic winner: Dhahran, Saudi Arabia

Tournaments

Qualification for the 2002 Little League World Series took place in sixteen different parts of the world during July and August 2002, with formats and number of teams varying by region.

== United States ==
=== Great Lakes ===
The tournament took place in Indianapolis, Indiana from August 1–10.

State	City	LL Organization	Record
Kentucky	Louisville	Valley Sports American	4–0
Indiana	Brownsburg	Brownsburg	3–1
Illinois	Bourbonnais	Bradley-Bourbonnais American	2–2
Ohio	Hamilton	West Side American	2–2
Michigan	Grosse Pointe Farms	Grosse Pointe Farms-City	1–3
Wisconsin	Merrill	Merrill	0–4

Semi-finals
August 9
Kentucky	2
Ohio	1
August 9
Indiana	5
Illinois	3

Final
August 10
Kentucky	8
Indiana	1

=== Mid-Atlantic ===
The tournament took place in Bristol, Connecticut from August 3–13.

State	City	LL Organization	Record
Delaware	Frankford	Lower Sussex	3–1
New Jersey	Hamilton Square	Nottingham	3–1
Pennsylvania	Bethlehem	Lehigh	3–1
New York	Manhattan	Harlem	2–2
Washington, D.C.		Capitol City	1–3
Maryland	Preston	South Caroline	0–4

Semi-finals
August 10
Delaware	5
New York	7
August 10
New Jersey	3
Pennsylvania	10

Final
August 13
New York	5
Pennsylvania	4

=== Midwest ===
The tournament took place in Indianapolis, Indiana from August 2–11.

State	City	LL Organization	Record
Iowa	Des Moines	Grandview	5–0
Missouri	Webb City	Webb City	4–0
Nebraska	Central City	Central City	2–3
South Dakota	Rapid City	Harney	1–3
Minnesota	Coon Rapids	Coon Rapids National	1–3
Kansas	Riverton	Riverton Area	0–4

Semi-finals
August 9
Iowa	5
Nebraska	3
August 9
Missouri	16
South Dakota	3

Final
August 11
Iowa	1
Missouri	2

=== New England ===
The tournament was held in Bristol, Connecticut from August 3–12.

State	City	LL Organization	Record
Connecticut	Orange	Orange	3–1
Massachusetts	Worcester	Jesse Burkett	3–1
New Hampshire	Portsmouth	Portsmouth	3–1
Rhode Island	Portsmouth	Portsmouth	2–2
Maine	Westbrook	Westbrook	1–3
Vermont	Essex Junction	Essex Junction	0–4

Semi-finals
August 10
Connecticut	0
Rhode Island	1
August 10
Massachusetts	1
New Hampshire	0

Final
August 12
Rhode Island	0
Massachusetts	1

=== Northwest ===
The tournament was held in San Bernardino, California from August 2–12.

State	City	LL Organization	Record
Washington	Mill Creek	Mill Creek	4–0
Idaho	Coeur d'Alene	Coeur d'Alene	3–1
Oregon	Salem	Parrish	2–2
Hawaii	Waipahu	Waipio	2–2
Montana	Missoula	Mount Sentinel	1–3
Alaska	Juneau	Gastineau Channel East	0–4

Semi-finals
August 10
Washington	3
Hawaii	5
August 10
Idaho	6
Oregon	4

Final
August 12
Hawaii	5
Idaho	3

=== Southeast ===
The tournament took place in St. Petersburg, Florida from August 3–10.

Pool A
State	City	LL Organization	Record
North Carolina	Clemmons	Southwest Forsyth	3–0
Virginia	Bridgewater	Bridgewater Community	2–1
West Virginia	Charles Town	Charles Town-Ranson	1–2
South Carolina	Spartanburg	Hillbrook	0–3

Pool B
State	City	LL Organization	Record
Florida	Bradenton	Braden River	3–0
Alabama	Phenix City	Phenix City American	1–2
(Georgia (U.S. state)) Georgia	Columbus	Columbus American	1–2
Tennessee	Morristown	Morristown American	1–2

Semi-finals
August 7
North Carolina	10
Alabama	4
August 7
Florida	3
Virginia	4

Final
August 9
North Carolina	4
Virginia	2

=== Southwest ===
The tournament took place in Waco, Texas from August 5–11.

Pool A
State	City	LL Organization	Record
Arkansas	Benton	Benton National	3–0
Louisiana	Lake Charles	South Lake Charles	2–1
New Mexico	Roswell	Noon Optimist	1–2
Colorado	Boulder	North Boulder	0–3

Pool B
State	City	LL Organization	Record
Texas East	Sugar Land	First Colony American	3–0
Texas West	Fort Worth	Fort Worth Westside	2–1
Mississippi	Ocean Springs	Ocean Springs	1–2
Oklahoma	Tulsa	Tulsa National	0–3

Semi-finals
August 9
Arkansas	5
Texas West	8
August 9
Texas East	4
Louisiana	1

Final
August 11
Texas West	2
Texas East	0

=== West ===
The tournament took place in San Bernardino, California from August 2–13.

State	City	LL Organization	Record
Northern California	Aptos	Aptos	3–1
Arizona	Glendale	Arrowhead	3–1
Nevada	Las Vegas	Peccole	2–2
Utah	Taylorsville	Taylorsville	2–2
Southern California	Anaheim	West Anaheim	2–2
Wyoming	Laramie	Laramie	0–4

Semi-finals
August 11
Northern California	4
Utah	1
August 11
Arizona	4
Nevada	3

Final
August 13
Northern California	4
Arizona	3

== International ==
=== Asia ===
The tournament took place in Manila, Philippines from July 28–August 4.

Country	City	LL Organization	Record
Japan	Tokyo	Sendai Higashi	4–0
South Korea			2–2
Hong Kong			0–4

Final
August 3
Japan	6
South Korea	1

=== Canada ===
The tournament was held in Lethbridge, Alberta from August 2–11.

Province	City	LL Organization	Record
Saskatchewan	Regina	North Regina	4–1
British Columbia	Surrey	Whalley	4–1
Ontario	Ottawa	Gloucester	4–1
Nova Scotia	Sydney	Sydney	2–3
Alberta (Host)	Lethbridge	Lethbridge Southwest	1–4
Quebec	Salaberry-de-Valleyfield	Valleyfield	0–5

Semi-finals
August 8
Saskatchewan	6
Nova Scotia	4
August 8
British Columbia	0
Ontario	5

Final
August 9
Saskatchewan	5
Ontario	0

=== Caribbean ===
The tournament took place in St. Croix, United States Virgin Islands from July 26–August 4.

Pool A
Country	City	LL Organization	Record
Bonaire		Bonaire	2–2
US Virgin Islands	St. Thomas	Alvin McBean	2–2
Sint Maarten	Philipsburg	Sint Maarten	2–2

Pool B
Region	City	LL Organization	Record
Puerto Rico	Cabo Rojo	Adaberto Rodriues	3–0
Curaçao	Willemstad	Pariba	2–1
Aruba	San Nicolaas	Aruba South	1–2
US Virgin Islands (Host)	St. Croix	Elmo Plasket East	0–3

Semi-finals
July 25
Bonaire	3
Curaçao	4
July 25
Puerto Rico	8
(United States Virgin Islands) St. Thomas	6

Final
July 26
Curaçao	16
Puerto Rico	1
Third place
July 26
Bonaire	1
(United States Virgin Islands) St. Thomas	5

=== Europe, Middle East and Africa ===
The tournament took place in Kutno, Poland from July 4–14.

Country	Record
Russia	7–0
Romania	5–2
Georgia	5–2
Austria	4–3
Bulgaria	4–3
Poland	2–5
Germany	1–6
Lithuania	0–7

Semi-finals
July 13
Russia	7
(Georgia (country)) Georgia	0
July 13
Romania	6
Austria	2

Final
July 14
Russia	1
Romania	0
Third place
July 14
(Georgia (country)) Georgia	7
Austria	4

=== Latin America ===
The tournament took place in Managua, Nicaragua from July 27–August 4.

Country	Record
Panama	5–0
Venezuela	4–1
Nicaragua A	3–2
Nicaragua B	2–3
El Salvador	1–4
Colombia	0–5

Semi-finals
August 2
Panama	4
Nicaragua B	0
August 2
Venezuela	8
Nicaragua A	1

Final
August 3
Panama	2
Venezuela	3
Third place
August 3
Nicaragua B	2
Nicaragua A	5

=== Mexico ===
The tournament took place in Monterrey, Nuevo León from July 19–29.

Pool A
State	City	LL Organization	Record
Nuevo León	Monterrey	Unidad Modelo	5–2
Tamaulipas	Matamoros	Villa del Refugio	4–2
Sonora	Guaymas	Sector Pesca	3–3
Nuevo León	Anáhuac	Anáhuac	2–3
Jalisco	Tlaquepaque	Sutaj Tlaquepaque	2–3
Coahuila	Sabinas	Sabinas	0–5

Pool B
State	City	LL Organization	Record
Baja California	Mexicali	IMSS	7–0
Tamaulipas	Reynosa	Ninos Heroes	4–2
Nuevo León	Monterrey	Contry de Monterrey	4–2
CDMX	Mexico City	Olmeca	2–3
San Luis Potosí	San Luis Potosí	San Luis A.C.	1–4
Chihuahua	Ciudad Juárez	El Granjero	1–5

Semi-finals
July 28
(Baja California) IMSS	5
(Nuevo León) Contry de Monterrey	6
July 28
(Tamaulipas) Villa del Refugio	3
(Tamaulipas) Ninos Heroes	8

Final
July 29
(Nuevo León) Contry de Monterrey	6
(Tamaulipas) Ninos Heroes	3

=== Pacific ===
The tournament took place in Manila, Philippines from July 28–August 4.

Country	Record
Guam	4–0
Northern Mariana Islands	3–1
Indonesia	2–2
Philippines	1–3
New Zealand	0–4

Final
August 1
Guam	6
Northern Mariana Islands	2

=== Transatlantic ===
The tournament was held in Kutno, Poland from August 3–10.

Pool A
Country	City	LL Organization	Record
Belgium	Brussels	SHAPE/Waterloo	3–0
Spain	Rota	Rota	2–1
Germany	Ramstein-Miesenbach	Ramstein	1–2
Austria	Vienna	AIBC	0–3

Pool B
Country	City	LL Organization	Record
Saudi Arabia	Dhahran	Arabian-American	3–0
Netherlands	Brunssum/Schinnen	Brunssum/Schinnen	2–1
England	London	London Area Youth	1–2
Italy	Naples	Naples	0–3

Semi-finals
July 22
Belgium	11
Netherlands	5
July 22
Saudi Arabia	5
Spain	2

Final
July 23
Belgium	1
Saudi Arabia	10
Third place
July 23
Netherlands	11
Spain	7
