= 2001 Little League World Series qualification =

Children's baseball competition qualification

United States
- Great Lakes winner: Brownsburg, Indiana
- Gulf States winner: Lake Charles, Louisiana
- Mid-Atlantic winner: (New York (state)) Bronx, New York
- Midwest winner: Davenport, Iowa
- New England winner: Lincoln, Rhode Island
- Northwest winner: (Washington (state)) Bainbridge Island, Washington
- Southeast winner: Apopka, Florida
- West winner: Oceanside, California

International
- Asia winner: Tokyo, Japan
- Canada winner: (Canada) Calgary, Alberta
- Caribbean winner: Willemstad, Curaçao
- Europe, Middle East and Africa winner: Moscow, Russia
- Latin America winner: Santiago de Veraguas, Panama
- Mexico winner: Matamoros, Mexico
- Pacific winner: Hagåtña, Guam
- Transatlantic winner: Dhahran, Saudi Arabia

Tournaments

Qualification for the 2001 Little League World Series took place in sixteen different parts of the world during July and August 2001, with formats and number of teams varying by region.

== United States ==
=== Great Lakes ===
The tournament took place in Indianapolis, Indiana from August 4–12.

State	City	LL Organization	Record
Indiana	Brownsburg	Brownsburg	4–0
Michigan	Roosevelt Park	Roosevelt Park	3–1
Illinois	Lansing	Lansing East	2–2
Kentucky	Owensboro	Owensboro Southern	2–2
Wisconsin	Appleton	Appleton Kiwanis	1–3
Ohio	Fairborn	Fairborn American	0–4

Semi-finals
August 10
Indiana	3
Kentucky	2
August 10
Michigan	9
Illinois	8

Final
August 11
Indiana	4
Michigan	1

=== Gulf States ===
The tournament took place in Gulfport, Florida from August 3–12.

State	City	LL Organization	Record
Louisiana	Lake Charles	South Lake Charles	4–0
Texas	The Woodlands	ORWALL American	3–1
Mississippi	Biloxi	Biloxi National	2–2
Oklahoma	Grove	Grove Sports	2–2
Alabama	Huntsville	Huntsville National	1–3
Arkansas	Benton	Benton National	1–3
Tennessee	Hermitage	Donelson American	1–3

Semi-finals
August 9
Louisiana	5
Oklahoma	0
August 9
Texas	7
Mississippi	4

Final
August 11
Louisiana	6
Texas	5

=== Mid-Atlantic ===
The tournament took place in Bristol, Connecticut from August 5–14.

State	City	LL Organization	Record
Maryland	Easton	Easton	4–0
Pennsylvania	State College	State College American	3–1
New Jersey	Randolph	Randolph West	2–2
New York	Bronx	Rolando Paulino	2–2*
Delaware	Wilmington	Midway	1–3
Washington, D.C.		Capitol City	0–4

Semi-finals
August 11
Maryland	0
(New York (state)) New York	11*
August 11
Pennsylvania	3
New Jersey	0

Final
August 14
(New York (state)) New York	2*
Pennsylvania	0

*All games played by the New York representative, Rolando Paulino Little League, were forfeited due to the use of an ineligible player, Danny Almonte. The Mid-Atlantic Championship was retroactively awarded to the Pennsylvania representative, the State College American Little League.

=== Midwest ===
The tournament took place in Indianapolis, Indiana from August 4–12.

State	City	LL Organization	Record
Iowa	Davenport	Davenport East	4–0
Missouri	De Soto	De Soto	3–1
Minnesota	Circle Pines	Centennial Lakes Black	2–2
Nebraska	Omaha	Keystone	2–2
South Dakota	Rapid City	Harney	1–3
Kansas	Baxter Springs	Baxter Springs	0–4

Semi-finals
August 10
Iowa	4
Nebraska	3
August 10
Missouri	2
Minnesota	9

Final
August 12
Iowa	4
Minnesota	3

=== New England ===
The tournament was held in Bristol, Connecticut from August 5–14.

State	City	LL Organization	Record
Connecticut	Wallingford	Yalesville	4–0
Rhode Island	Lincoln	Lincoln	3–1
Massachusetts	Pittsfield	Pittsfield South	2–2
Vermont	South Burlington	South Burlington	1–3
Maine	Damariscotta	Lincoln County	1–3
New Hampshire	Manchester	Manchester East	1–3

Semi-finals
August 11
Connecticut	0
Vermont	3
August 11
Rhode Island	5
Massachusetts	4

Final
August 13
Vermont	3
Rhode Island	6

=== Northwest ===
The tournament was held in San Bernardino, California from August 4–14.

State	City	LL Organization	Record
Washington	Bainbridge Island	Bainbridge Island	4–0
Montana	Billings	Billings Big Sky	3–1
Oregon	Salem	West Salem	2–2
Wyoming	Laramie	Laramie	2–2
Colorado	Colorado Springs	Academy	1–3
Idaho	Coeur d'Alene	Coeur d'Alene	1–3
Alaska	Juneau	Gastineau Channel East	0–4

Semi-finals
August 11
(Washington (state)) Washington	7
Wyoming	2
August 11
Oregon	2
Montana	1

Final
August 13
(Washington (state)) Washington	5
Oregon	4

=== Southeast ===
The tournament took place in Gulfport, Florida from August 3–12.

State	City	LL Organization	Record
Florida	Apopka	Apopka National	4–0
Virginia	Vienna	Vienna American	4–0
(Georgia (U.S. state)) Georgia	Sandy Springs	Sandy Springs	2–2
North Carolina	Matthews	Matthews National	1–3
South Carolina	Taylors	Northwood National	1–3
West Virginia	Fairmont	Fairmont	0–4

Semi-finals
August 7
Florida	5
North Carolina	3
August 7
Virginia	0
(Georgia (U.S. state)) Georgia	1

Final
August 9
Florida	8
(Georgia (U.S. state)) Georgia	3

=== West ===
The tournament took place in San Bernardino, California from August 4–14.

State	City	LL Organization	Record
Southern California	Oceanside	Oceanside American	4–0
Arizona	Tucson	San Xavier	2–2
Nevada	Henderson	Green Valley	2–2
Utah	Taylorsville	Taylorsville	2–2
Northern California	Los Gatos	Los Gatos	2–2
Hawaii	ʻEwa Beach	ʻEwa	1–3
New Mexico	Albuquerque	Eastdale	1–3

Semi-finals
August 11
Southern California	4
Utah	2
August 11
Arizona	3
Nevada	5

Final
August 13
Southern California	12
Nevada	8

== International ==
=== Asia ===
The tournament took place in Hong Kong from July 28–August 4.

Country	City	LL Organization	Record
Japan	Tokyo	Tokyo Kitasuna	4–0
South Korea			2–2
Hong Kong			0–4

Final
August 3
Japan	6
South Korea	1

=== Canada ===
The tournament was held in Vancouver, British Columbia from August 4–11.

Province	City	LL Organization	Record
Quebec	Salaberry-de-Valleyfield	Valleyfield	4–1
Alberta	Calgary	Calgary West	3–2
British Columbia	Victoria	Gordon Head	3–2
Ontario	Toronto	High Park	3–2
British Columbia (Host)	Vancouver	Little Mountain	1–4
Nova Scotia	Glace Bay	Glace Bay	1–4

Semi-finals
August 10
Quebec	0
Ontario	7
August 10
British Columbia	1
Alberta	4

Final
August 11
Ontario	3
Alberta	5

=== Caribbean ===
The tournament took place in Panama City, Panama from July 20–28.

Country	Record
Aruba	5–0
Curaçao	5–1
Puerto Rico	4–1
Dominican Republic	3–3
Bahamas	2–4
United States Virgin Islands	1–5
Sint Maarten	0–6

Semi-finals
July 27
Aruba	2
Dominican Republic	1
July 27
Curaçao	4
Puerto Rico	3

Final
July 28
Aruba	1
Curaçao	3

=== Europe, Middle East and Africa ===
The tournament took place in Kutno, Poland from August 2–10.

Pool A
Country	Record
Russia	6–0
Germany	5–1
Kazakhstan	4–2
Lithuania	2–4
Romania	2–4
Bulgaria	1–5
Austria	1–5

Pool B
Country	Record
Georgia	5–0
Belgium	4–1
Poland	3–2
Ukraine	2–3
Slovakia	1–4
Kenya	0–5

Semi-finals
August 9
Russia	8
Belgium	2
August 9
(Georgia (country)) Georgia	6
Germany	5

Final
August 10
Russia	12
(Georgia (country)) Georgia	2

=== Latin America ===
The tournament took place in Panama City, Panama from July 20–28.

Country	Record
Venezuela	5–1
Panama	4–2
Nicaragua	2–4
Colombia	1–5

Final
July 28
Venezuela	2
Panama	3

=== Mexico ===
The tournament took place from July 14–20.

Pool A
State	City	LL Organization	Record
Nuevo León	Guadalupe	Mala Torres	5–0
Tamaulipas	Matamoros	Matamoros	4–1
Jalisco	Zapopan	Legion Americana	3–2
Sonora	Hermosillo	Tepeyac	2–3
(Chihuahua (state)) Chihuahua	Parral	IMSS-Parral	1–4
Nuevo León	Monterrey	Mitras	0–5

Pool B
State	City	LL Organization	Record
Nuevo León	Guadalupe	Guadalupe-Linda Vista	4–1
(Chihuahua (state)) Chihuahua	Ciudad Juárez	Villahermosa	4–1
Zacatecas	Zacatecas	Cerro de la Bufa	4–1
Baja California	Mexicali	IMSS-Mexicali	2–3
Tamaulipas	Reynosa	Trevino Kelly	1–4
Nuevo León	San Nicolás de los Garza	Cuauhtemoc	0–5

Semi-finals
July 19
Mala Torres	1
(Chihuahua (state)) Villahermosa	5
July 19
Guadelupe-Linda Vista	3
(Tamaulipas) Matamoros	4

Final
July 20
(Chihuahua (state)) Villahermosa	0
(Tamaulipas) Matamoros	3

=== Pacific ===
The tournament took place in Hong Kong from July 29–August 3.

Country	Record
Guam	4–0
Northern Mariana Islands	3–1
Philippines	2–2
Indonesia	1–3
New Zealand	0–4

=== Transatlantic ===
The tournament was held in Kutno, Poland from July 8–15.

Country	City	LL Organization	Record
Saudi Arabia	Dhahran	Arabian-American	6–0
Germany	Ramstein-Miesenbach	Ramstein	5–1
England	London	London Area Youth	3–3
Spain	Rota	Rota	3–3
Belgium	Brussels	SHAPE/Waterloo	2–4
Italy	Naples	Naples	2–4
Austria	Vienna	AIBC	0–6

Final
July 15
Saudi Arabia	2
Germany	0
