= 2005 Little League World Series qualification =

Children's baseball competition qualification

United States
- Great Lakes winner: Owensboro, Kentucky
- Mid-Atlantic winner: Newtown, Pennsylvania
- Midwest winner: Davenport, Iowa
- New England winner: Westbrook, Maine
- Northwest winner: ʻEwa Beach, Hawaii
- Southeast winner: Maitland, Florida
- Southwest winner: Lafayette, Louisiana
- West winner: Vista, California

International
- Asia winner: Chiba, Japan
- Canada winner: (Canada) Surrey, British Columbia
- Caribbean winner: Willemstad, Curaçao
- Europe, Middle East & Africa winner: Moscow, Russia
- Latin America winner: Valencia, Venezuela
- Mexico winner: Mexicali, Mexico
- Pacific winner: Mangilao, Guam
- Transatlantic winner: Dhahran, Saudi Arabia

Tournaments

Qualification for the 2005 Little League World Series took place in eight United States regions and eight international regions from June through August 2005.

== United States ==
=== Great Lakes ===
The tournament took place in Indianapolis, Indiana from August 3–10.

State	City	LL Organization	Record
Kentucky	Owensboro	Owensboro Southern	4–0
Wisconsin	Bristol	Lakeland National	3–1
Illinois	Kankakee	Limestone	2–2
Michigan	Grand Rapids	Western	2–2
Indiana	Seymour	Seymour	1–3
Ohio	Boardman	Boardman Community East	0–4

Semi-finals
August 11 – Indianapolis
Wisconsin	2
Illinois	10
August 11 – Indianapolis
Kentucky	5
Michigan	1

Final
August 13 – Indianapolis
Illinois	10
Kentucky	11

=== Mid-Atlantic ===
The tournament took place in Bristol, Connecticut from August 6–15.

State	City	LL Organization	Record
Pennsylvania	Newtown	Council Rock Newtown	4–0
Maryland	Thurmont	Thurmont	2–2
New Jersey	Toms River	Toms River American	2–2
Delaware	Bear	Canal	2–2
New York	Merrick	Merrick-North Merrick	0–4

Semi-finals
August 12 – Bristol
New Jersey	16
Maryland	0
August 12 – Bristol
Pennsylvania	11
Delaware	9

Final
August 15 – Bristol
New Jersey	3
Pennsylvania	4

=== Midwest ===
The tournament took place in Indianapolis, Indiana from August 5–12.

State	City	LL Organization	Record
Iowa	Davenport	Davenport Northwest	4–0
Minnesota	Circle Pines	Centennial Lakes East	3–1
Kansas	Baxter Springs	Baxter Springs	2–2
South Dakota	Rapid City	Harney	2–2
Missouri	Columbia	Daniel Boone National	1–3
Nebraska	Omaha	Hillside	0–4

Semi-finals
August 11 – Indianapolis
Minnesota	14
Kansas	4
August 11 – Indianapolis
Iowa	10
South Dakota	2

Final
August 12 – Indianapolis
Minnesota	4
Iowa	6

=== New England ===
The tournament took place in Bristol, Connecticut from August 6–14.

State	City	LL Organization	Record
Connecticut	Farmington	Farmington	4–0
New Hampshire	Bedford	Bedford	3–1
Rhode Island	Cranston	Cranston Western	2–2
Maine	Westbrook	Westbrook	1–3
Massachusetts	Dudley	Dudley	1–3
Vermont	Shelburne	Shelburne	1–3

Semi-finals
August 12 – Bristol
New Hampshire	4
Rhode Island	11
August 12 – Bristol
Connecticut	4
Maine	6

Final
August 14 – Bristol
Rhode Island	2
Maine	7

=== Northwest ===
The tournament took place in San Bernardino, California on August 6–15.

State	City	LL organization	Record
Hawaii	'Ewa Beach	West Oahu	4–0
Washington	Chehalis	Chehalis	4–0
Oregon	Beaverton	Murrayhill	2–2
Idaho	Boise	Northwest Ada	1–3
Montana	Billings	Heights National	1–3
Alaska	Anchorage	Dimond-West	0–4

Semi-finals
August 13 – San Bernardino
Hawaii	6
Oregon	5
August 13 – San Bernardino
(Washington (state)) Washington	3
Idaho	6

Final
August 15 – San Bernardino
Hawaii	12
Idaho	1

=== Southeast ===
The tournament took place in St. Petersburg, Florida from August 6–12.

Pool A
State	City	LL Organization	Record
(Georgia (U.S. state)) Georgia	Atlanta	Buckhead	2–1
Tennessee	Columbia	Columbia American	2–1
North Carolina	Clemmons	Southwest Forsyth	2–1
South Carolina	Greenville	Northwood American	0–3

Pool B
State	City	LL Organization	Record
Florida	Maitland	Maitland	2–1
West Virginia	Barboursville	Barboursville	2–1
Alabama	Phenix City	Phenix City National	1–2
Virginia	Springfield	West Springfield American	1–2

Semi-finals
August 10 – St. Petersburg
(Georgia (U.S. state)) Georgia	14
West Virginia	3
August 10 – St. Petersburg
Florida	9
Tennessee	2

Final
August 12 – St. Petersburg
(Georgia (U.S. state)) Georgia	1
Florida	3

=== Southwest ===
The tournament took place in Waco, Texas from August 7–13.

Pool A
State	City	LL Organization	Record
Mississippi	Biloxi	Biloxi	2–1
Texas East	Brenham	Washington County	2–1
New Mexico	Albuquerque	Eastdale	1–2
Oklahoma	Tulsa	Tulsa National	1–2

Pool B
State	City	LL Organization	Record
Arkansas	Bryant	Bryant Athletic	3–0
Louisiana	Lafayette	Lafayette	2–1
Texas West	Laredo	Del Mar	1–2
Colorado	Colorado Springs	Academy	0–3

Semi-finals
August 12 – Waco
Louisiana	7
Texas East	2
August 12 – Waco
Arkansas	4
Mississippi	2

Final
August 13 – Waco
Louisiana	4
Arkansas	1

=== West ===
The tournament took place in San Bernardino, California from August 6–14.

State	City	LL Organization	Record
Southern California	Vista	Rancho Buena Vista	4–0
Arizona	Chandler	Chandler National	3–1
Northern California	Tracy	Tracy National	2–2
Nevada	Las Vegas	Peccole	2–2
Wyoming	Gillette	Gillette	1–3
Utah	Santa Clara	Snow Canyon	0–4

Semi-finals
August 12 – San Bernardino
Arizona	0
Northern California	10
August 12 – San Bernardino
Southern California	13
Nevada	2

Final
August 14 – San Bernardino
Northern California	2
Southern California	7

== International ==
=== Asia ===
The tournament took place in Fukuoka, Japan from July 23–29.

Country	City	LL Organization	Record
Japan	Chiba	Chiba City	3–1
South Korea			3–1
Taiwan			3–1
Hong Kong			1–3
Thailand			0–4

Japan advanced to the Little League World Series on a defensive runs per inning tiebreaker.

=== Canada ===
The tournament took place in Timmins, Ontario from August 6–13.

Province	City	LL Organization	Record
Ontario	Toronto	High Park	5–0
British Columbia	Surrey	Whalley	4–1
Saskatchewan	Regina	North Regina	3–2
Nova Scotia	Glace Bay	Glace Bay #1	2–3
Ontario	Timmins	La Ronde	1–4
(Quebec) Québec	Salaberry-de-Valleyfield	Valleyfield	0–5

Consolation game
August 12 – Timmins
Quebec	7
(Ontario) Timmins, ON	7

Semi-finals
August 12 – Timmins
(Ontario) Toronto, ON	7
Nova Scotia	4
August 12 – Timmins
British Columbia	5
Saskatchewan	1

Final
August 13 – Timmins
(Ontario) Toronto, ON	1
British Columbia	6
Third place
August 13 – Timmins
Nova Scotia	4
Saskatchewan	5

=== Caribbean ===
The tournament took place in Saint Croix, U.S. Virgin Islands from July 24–30.

Pool A
Country	City	LL Organization	Record
Aruba	Oranjestad	Aruba North	3–0
Dominican Republic	Puerto Plata	Antonio Irizarry	2–1
Puerto Rico	Yauco	Tati Lugo	1–2
United States Virgin Islands	St. Thomas	Elrod Hendricks	0–3

Pool B
Region	City	LL Organization	Record
Curaçao	Willemstad	Pabao	2–1
Netherlands Antilles	Bonaire	Bonaire	2–1
United States Virgin Islands	St. Croix	Elmo Plaskett	1–2
Sint Maarten	Philipsburg	St. Maarten	0–3

Semi-finals
July 29 – St. Croix
Curaçao	5
Dominican Republic	1
July 29 – St. Croix
Netherlands Antilles	4
Aruba	2

Final
July 30 – St. Croix
Curaçao	8
Netherlands Antilles	0
Third place
July 30 – St. Croix
Dominican Republic	0
Aruba	3

=== Europe, Middle East & Africa ===
The tournament took place in Kutno, Poland from August 1–8.

Pool A
Country	City	LL Organization	Record
Russia	Moscow	Brateevo	4–0
Netherlands	Utrecht	Utrecht	3–1
Germany	Mannheim	Baden-Württemberg	2–2
Slovenia	Ljubljana	Ljubljuna	1–3
Scotland	Glasgow	Glasgow	0–4

Pool B
Region	City	LL Organization	Record
Moldova	Tiraspol	Kvint	5–0
Poland	Kutno	Kutno	4–1
Lithuania	Vilnius	Vilnius	3–2
Austria	Vienna	AIBC	1–4
Belarus	Brest	Brest Zubrs	1–4
Bulgaria	Sofia	Bulgarian American	1–4

Quarterfinals
3A	Germany	0
2B	Poland	6
3B	Lithuania	0
2A	Netherlands	10

Semifinals
1A	Russia	11
2B	Poland	0
1B	Moldova	1
2A	Netherlands	6

Championship
1A	Russia	8
2A	Netherlands	3
Third place
2B	Poland	2
1B	Moldova	4

=== Latin America ===
The tournament took place in Maracaibo, Venezuela from July 10–16.

Country	City	LL Organization	Record
Venezuela	Los Puertos de Altagracia	Altagracia	4–0
Venezuela	Valencia	Los Leones	3–1
Panama	Panama City	Curundu	2–2
Guatemala	Guatemala City	Javier	1–3
Colombia	Cartagena	Confenalco	0–4

Semi-finals
July 15 – Maracaibo
(Venezuela) Altagracia	18
Guatemala	6
July 15 – Maracaibo
(Venezuela) Valencia	3
Panama	1

Final
July 16 – Maracaibo (Forfeit)
(Venezuela) Altagracia	0
(Venezuela) Valencia	6
Third place
July 16 – Maracaibo
Guatemala	3
Panama	13

=== Mexico ===
The tournament took place in Reynosa, Tamaulipas from July 23 to August 1.

==== Phase 1 ====
Pool A
City	LL Organization	Record
Mexico City, D.F.	Olmeca	4–1
Guadalupe, Nuevo León	Linda Vista	3–2
(Jalisco) Tlaquepaque	Sutaj Tlaquepaque	3–2
Sonora	Agua Prieta	2–3
Tamaulipas	Guadalupe Trevino Kelly	1–4

Pool B
City	LL Organization	Record
(Tamaulipas) Matamoros	Matamoros	4–1
(Baja California) Mexicali	Seguro Social	4–1
(Jalisco) Guadalajara	Legión Zapopan	3–2
Guadalupe, Nuevo León	Epitacio "Mala" Torres	3–2
Mexico City, D.F.	Linda Vista	1–4
(Chihuahua (state)) Juárez	Satellite	0–5

==== Phase 2 ====
City	LL Organization	Record
Guadalupe, Nuevo León	Linda Vista	5–0
(Baja California) Mexicali	Seguro Social	4–1
Mexico City, D.F.	Olmeca	2–3
(Jalisco) Tlaquepaque	Sutaj Tlaquepaque	2–3
(Jalisco) Guadalajara	Legión Zapopan	1–4
(Tamaulipas) Matamoros	Matamoros	1–4

==== Championship round ====
Semi-finals
July 31 – Reynosa
(Nuevo León) Guadalupe	1
Mexico City	3
July 31 – Reynosa
(Baja California) Mexicali	8
(Jalisco) Tlaquepaque	2

Final
August 1 – Reynosa
Mexico City	2
(Baja California) Mexicali	5
Third place
August 1 – Reynosa
(Nuevo León) Guadalupe	7
(Jalisco) Tlaquepaque	5

=== Pacific ===
The tournament took place in Fukuoka, Japan from July 23–29.

Country	City	LL Organization	Record
Guam	Mangilao	Central East	4–0
Indonesia			3–1
Philippines			2–2
Northern Mariana Islands	Saipan	Saipan	1–3
New Zealand			0–4

=== Transatlantic ===
The tournament took place in Vilseck, Germany from August 1–8.

Country	City	LL Organization	Record
Saudi Arabia	Dhahran	Arabian-American	6–0
Belgium	Brussels	SHAPE/Waterloo	4–2
Germany	Rammstein	Ramstein American	4–2
Spain	Rota	Rota Navy Base	4-2
Italy	Naples	Naples Navy Base	2–4
England	Suffolk	East Anglia	1–5
Netherlands	Brunssum/Schinnen	Brunssum/Schinnen	0–6

Semi-finals
August 10 – Vilseck
Saudi Arabia	14
Spain	0
August 10 – Vilseck
Germany	8
Belgium	2

Final
August 11 – Vilseck
Saudi Arabia	13
Germany	2
Third place
August 11 – Vilseck
Spain	2
Belgium	9
