= San Joaquín de la Vega =

- Location within Venezuela
- Coordinates: 9.7739°N 70.8064°W
- Time zone: UTC−4 (VET)

San Joaquin de la Vega is a locality In the municipality of Miranda in the state of Zulia, belonging to the parish of San Antonio. In 2011 it was the third most populated locality of Miranda municipality, only surpassed by Consejo de Ciruma and Ports of Altagracia.

San Joaquin is a rural settlement with a population of about 7,500 inhabitants. The settlement is named after San Joaquin.
