= 2022 Little League World Series =

Baseball tournament for children aged 10 to 12 years old

Tournament details
- Dates: August 17–August 28
- Teams: 20

Final positions
- Champions: (United States) Honolulu Little League, Honolulu, Hawaii
- Runners-up: (Curaçao) Pabao Little League, Willemstad, Curacao

The 2022 Little League World Series was a youth baseball tournament which took place from August 17 to August 28 at the Little League headquarters complex in South Williamsport, Pennsylvania. Ten teams from the United States and ten teams from other countries competed in the 75th edition of the Little League World Series (LLWS). Honolulu Little League of Honolulu, Hawaii, defeated Pabao Little League of Willemstad, Curaçao, in the championship game by a 13–3 score; the game ended in four innings due to the run rule.

This was the first LLWS with a 20-team format. International teams returned to the tournament after the 2021 edition was held only with teams based in the United States, as a result of the COVID-19 pandemic. The general public was able to attend tournament games with no attendance restrictions for the first time since the 2019 edition.

== Teams ==
Regional qualifying tournaments were held from February to August 2022. This is the first year for the Metro Region and the Mountain Region in the United States. This is also the first year of an annual rotational schedule involving the Caribbean and Latin America Regions whereby two of the three champions from Cuba, Panama, and Puerto Rico qualify directly while the third may still qualify through their normal regional tournament. In 2022, champions from Panama and Puerto Rico directly qualified.

United States		International	
Region	Team	Region	Team
Great Lakes	(Indiana) Hagerstown, Indiana; Hagerstown Little League	Asia-Pacific and Middle East	Taipei, Taiwan (Chinese Taipei)^{[a]} Fu-Lin Little League
Metro	(New York (state)) Massapequa, New York; Massapequa Coast Little League	Australia	(Australia) (Queensland) Brisbane, Queensland; Brisbane North Little League
Mid-Atlantic	(Pennsylvania) Hollidaysburg, Pennsylvania; Hollidaysburg Area Little League	Canada	(Canada) (British Columbia) Vancouver, British Columbia; Little Mountain Little League
Midwest	(Iowa) Davenport, Iowa; Davenport Southeast Little League	Caribbean	(Curaçao) Willemstad, Curaçao; Pabao Little League
Mountain	(Utah) Santa Clara, Utah; Snow Canyon Little League	Europe and Africa	(Italy) Bologna, Italy; Emilia Romagna Little League
New England	(Massachusetts) Middleborough, Massachusetts; Middleboro Little League	Japan	(Japan) (Hyōgo Prefecture) Takarazuka, Hyōgo; Takarazuka Little League
Northwest	(Washington (state)) Bonney Lake, Washington; Bonney Lake/Sumner Little League	Latin America	(Nicaragua) Managua, Nicaragua; 14 de Septiembre Little League
Southeast	(Tennessee) Nolensville, Tennessee; Nolensville Little League	Mexico	(Mexico) (Tamaulipas) Matamoros, Tamaulipas; Matamoros Little League
Southwest	(Texas) Pearland, Texas; Pearland Little League	Panama	(Panama) (Coclé) Aguadulce, Coclé; Aguadulce Cabezera Little League
West	(Hawaii) Honolulu, Hawaii; Honolulu Little League	Puerto Rico	(Puerto Rico) (San Juan, Puerto Rico) Guaynabo, Puerto Rico; Amelia Guaynabo Baseball Little League

^{a} Republic of China, commonly known as Taiwan, due to complicated relations with People's Republic of China, is recognized by the name Chinese Taipei by majority of international organizations including Little League Baseball (LLB). For more information, please see Cross-Strait relations.

== Results ==
The draw to determine the opening round pairings took place on June 13, 2022.

=== United States bracket ===
Upper round 1	Upper round 2	Upper round 3	Upper final	Final
August 19 – Game 10
August 17 – Game 2	Utah	2
August 22 – Game 22 (F/7)
Tennessee	5	Tennessee	11
Tennessee	5
Massachusetts	3	August 18 – Game 6
Indiana	2
Iowa	7
August 24 – Game 30 (F/4)
Indiana	8
Tennessee	0
August 19 – Game 12 (F/5)
Hawaii	13
August 17 – Game 4 (F/5)	Hawaii	12
August 22 – Game 24
(Washington (state)) Washington	1	(New York (state)) New York	0
Hawaii	6
Hawaii	11	August 18 – Game 8
Texas	0
Texas	8	August 27 – U.S. Championship
Pennsylvania	3	Hawaii	5
Tennessee	1
Lower round 1	Lower round 2	Lower round 3	Lower round 4	Lower final
August 23 – Game 28
August 21 – Game 18	Texas	4	August 25 – Game 34
August 20 – Game 14	Iowa	10	Iowa	0	August 24 – Game 32	Tennessee	7
Iowa	6	Utah	2	Texas	8	Texas	1
Washington	3	August 23 – Game 26 (F/4)	Pennsylvania	4
August 22 – Game 20	Indiana	0
August 20 – Game 16	Pennsylvania	7	Pennsylvania	10
Massachusetts	5	New York	1
Pennsylvania	7

=== International bracket ===
Upper round 1	Upper round 2	Upper round 3	Upper final	Final
August 19 – Game 9
August 17 – Game 1	Panama	9
August 22 – Game 21
Curaçao	2	Curaçao	3
Panama	0
Nicaragua	0	August 18 – Game 5
Taiwan	7
Taiwan	2
August 24 – Game 29
Italy	0
Taiwan	5
August 19 – Game 11
Mexico	1
August 17 – Game 3	Canada	6
August 22 – Game 23 (F/5)
Canada	7	Japan	0
Canada	0
Australia	0	August 18 – Game 7
Mexico	10
Puerto Rico	1	August 27 – Int'l Championship
Mexico	6	Taiwan	0
Curaçao	1
Lower round 1	Lower round 2	Lower round 3	Lower round 4	Lower final
August 23 – Game 27
August 21 – Game 17	Canada	2	August 25 – Game 33
August 20 – Game 13	Italy	0	Curaçao	4	August 24 – Game 31	Mexico	1
Italy	12	Curaçao	1	Curaçao	7	Curaçao	2
Australia	7	August 23 – Game 25	Nicaragua	2
August 21/22 (F/11) – Game 19	Nicaragua	8
August 20 – Game 15	Japan	7	Panama	1
Puerto Rico	1	Nicaragua	8
Nicaragua	3

Third place game
Taiwan	2
Tennessee	0

Championship game
Curaçao (F/4)	3
Hawaii	13

2022 Little League World Series Champions
Honolulu Little League
Honolulu, Hawaii

== Champions path ==
Round	Opposition	Result
Hawaiʻi State Tournament
Opening round	Hilo LL	14–4 (F/4)
Winner's Bracket Semifinals	Kawaihau Community LL	8–3
Winner's Bracket Final	Central East Maui LL	8–2
Finals	Kawaihau Community LL	10–0 (F/4)
West Regional Tournament
Winner's Bracket Semifinal	(California) Glendora American LL	3–0
Semifinal	(California) Tri-City LL	13–3 (F/5)
Finals	(Arizona) Sidewinder LL	9–2

== MLB Little League Classic ==
On August 22, 2021, it was announced that the fifth MLB Little League Classic would feature the Baltimore Orioles and the Boston Red Sox. The matchup was rescheduled from the 2020 MLB season when events were canceled due to the COVID-19 pandemic. The game was played on August 21, 2022, at Muncy Bank Ballpark at Historic Bowman Field, and won by the Orioles, 5–3.
