= Little League World Series (West Region) =

Children's baseball tournament

West Region
- Most recent season or competition: 2026 Little League World Series qualification
- Formerly: West Region (pre-split)
- Sport: Baseball
- Founded: 2001; 25 years ago
- No. of teams: 4
- Country: United States
- Most recent champions: Sweetwater Valley Little League, Bonita, California
- Most titles: Southern California (11) Honolulu Little League Honolulu, Hawaii (4)

The West Region is one of ten United States regions that currently send teams to the Little League World Series, the largest youth baseball competition in the world. The region's participation in the LLWS dates back to 1957, when it was known as the West Region. However, when the LLWS was expanded in 2001 from eight teams (four U.S. teams and four "International" teams from the rest of the world) to 16 teams (eight U.S. and eight International), the former West Region was split into the Northwest Region and a new West Region. The West Region headquarters is in San Bernardino, California.

The West Region is made up of four districts in three states.

- Arizona
- California (Split into "Northern" and "Southern")
- Hawaii

Wyoming was a member of the region from 2002 to 2006. During that time, Hawaii was in the Northwest Region. New Mexico was a part of the region in 2001, but was put in the Southwest Region the following year.

Following the 2021 LLWS, Utah and Nevada has been moved to a newly created Mountain Region. The latter region is one of the two new U.S. regions to be created as part of a planned expansion of the LLWS from 16 to 20 teams. This expansion was originally scheduled to occur for 2021, but was delayed to 2022 due to the COVID-19 pandemic.

== Regional championship ==
The list below lists each state's participant in the Little League West Region Tournament. That year's winner is indicated in green.

=== 2001 ===
| Year | Arizona | Northern California | Southern California | Hawaii | Nevada | New Mexico | Utah |
|---|---|---|---|---|---|---|---|
| 2001 | San Xavier LL; Tucson | Los Gatos LL; Los Gatos | Oceanside American LL; Oceanside | ʻEwa Beach LL ʻEwa Beach | Green Valley LL; Henderson | Eastdale LL; Albuquerque | Taylorsville LL; Taylorsville |

=== 2002–2005 ===
In 2002, some Little League regions were realigned. This resulted in Wyoming joining the West Region, Hawaii moving to the Northwest Region, and New Mexico becoming part of the Southwest Region.

| Year | Arizona | Northern California | Southern California | Nevada | Utah | Wyoming |
|---|---|---|---|---|---|---|
| 2002 | Arrowhead LL; Glendale | Aptos LL; Aptos | West Anaheim LL; Anaheim | Peccole LL; Las Vegas | Taylorsville LL; Taylorsville | Laramie LL; Laramie |
| 2003 | Chandler National LL; Chandler | Lakeside LL; Granite Bay | Vineyard LL; Rancho Cucamonga | Green Valley LL; Henderson | No representative^{[a]} | Laramie LL; Laramie |
| 2004 | Deer Valley LL; Glendale | Visalia National LL; Visalia | Conejo Valley East LL; Thousand Oaks | Green Valley LL; Henderson | Taylorsville LL; Taylorsville | Gillette LL; Gillette |
| 2005 | Chandler National LL; Chandler | Tracy National LL; Tracy | Rancho Buena Vista LL; Vista | Peccole LL; Las Vegas | Snow Canyon LL; Santa Clara | Gillette LL; Gillette |

- ^{[a]} Before the start of the regional tournament, Utah's state champions were disqualified for participating in a non-sanctioned tournament prior to the start of the state tournament. The state's runner-up, who had lost the championship game by forfeit, were awarded the title. However, they would also be disqualified later for the same reason. Little League officials, after failing to find another replacement team on such short notice, decided the regional tournament would have to take place without a team from Utah.

=== 2006–2021 ===
In 2006, Hawaii returned to compete in the West Region, while Wyoming was moved to the Northwest Region.

| Year | Arizona | Northern California | Southern California | Hawaii | Nevada | Utah |
|---|---|---|---|---|---|---|
| 2006 | Ahwatukee American LL; Phoenix | River Park LL; Fresno | Northridge City LL; Northridge | Waipio LL; Waipahu | Lone Mountain LL; Las Vegas | Snow Canyon LL; Santa Clara |
| 2007 | Chandler National LL; Chandler | Moreland District LL; San Jose | Solana Beach LL; Solana Beach | Waipio LL; Waipahu | Green Valley LL; Henderson | Snow Canyon LL; Santa Clara |
| 2008 | Arrowhead LL; Glendale | Pleasanton American LL; Pleasanton | Aliso Viejo National LL; Aliso Viejo | Waipio LL; Waipahu | Paseo Verde LL; Henderson | Cedar American LL; Cedar City |
| 2009 | Arrowhead LL; Glendale | Lakeside LL; Granite Bay | Park View LL; Chula Vista | Central East Maui LL; Wailuku | Legacy LL; Las Vegas | Cedar American LL; Cedar City |
| 2010 | North Scottsdale LL; Scottsdale | Napa National LL; Napa | Ocean View LL; Huntington Beach | Waipio LL; Waipahu | Mountain Ridge LL; Las Vegas | Washington LL; Washington |
| 2011 | Rio Rico LL; Rio Rico | Red Bluff LL; Red Bluff | Ocean View LL; Huntington Beach | Central East Maui LL; Wailuku | Silverado LL; Las Vegas | Washington LL; Washington |
| 2012 | Rincon LL; Tucson | Petaluma National LL; Petaluma | Orange LL; Orange | Nānākuli LL; Waianae | Cheyenne LL; North Las Vegas | Cedar National LL; Cedar City |
| 2013 | Chandler National South LL; Chandler | Belmont-Redwood Shores LL; Belmont | Eastlake LL; Chula Vista | Central East Maui LL; Wailuku | Mountain Ridge LL; Las Vegas | Dixie LL; St. George |
| 2014 | Chandler National North LL; Chandler | Pacifica American LL; Pacifica | Encinitas LL; Encinitas | Honolulu LL; Honolulu | Mountain Ridge LL; Las Vegas | Dixie LL; St. George |
| 2015 | Chandler National North LL; Chandler | Cambrian Park LL; San Jose | Sweetwater Valley LL; Bonita | Waipio LL; Waipahu | Paseo Verde LL; Henderson | Snow Canyon LL; Santa Clara |
| 2016 | Cactus Foothills South LL; Cave Creek | Vacaville Central LL; Vacaville | Park View LL; Chula Vista | Central East Maui LL; Wailuku | Mountain Ridge LL; Las Vegas | Snow Canyon LL; Santa Clara |
| 2017 | Chandler National North LL; Chandler | Canyon Creek LL; San Ramon | Santa Margarita National LL; Rancho Santa Margarita | Hilo LL; Hilo | Summerlin South LL; Las Vegas | Dixie LL; St. George |
| 2018 | Sunnyside LL; Tucson | Tri-City LL; Rocklin | Park View LL; Chula Vista | Honolulu LL; Honolulu | Silverado West LL; Las Vegas | Dixie LL; St. George |
| 2019 | Sunnyside LL; Tucson | Maidu LL; Roseville | Sweetwater Valley LL; Bonita | Central East Maui LL; Wailuku | Paseo Verde LL; Henderson | Washington LL; Washington |
| 2020 | Not held due to the COVID-19 pandemic | | | | | |
| 2021 | Queen Creek LL; Queen Creek | Petaluma National LL; Petaluma | Torrance LL; Torrance | Honolulu LL; Honolulu | Summerlin South LL; Las Vegas | Washington LL; Washington |

=== 2022–present ===
In 2022, Nevada and Utah joined the newly formed Mountain region.

| Year | Arizona | Northern California | Southern California | Hawaii |
|---|---|---|---|---|
| 2022 | Sidewinder LL; Peoria | Tri-City LL; Rocklin | Glendora American LL; Glendora | Honolulu LL; Honolulu |
| 2023 | Canyon View LL; Tucson | Bollinger Canyon LL; San Ramon | El Segundo LL; El Segundo | Hilo LL; Hilo |
| 2024 | Litchfield Park LL; Litchfield Park | Land Park Pacific LL; Sacramento | Eastvale LL; Eastvale | Central East Maui LL; Wailuku |
| 2025 | Arcadia LL; Phoenix | Alpine/West Menlo LL; Menlo Park | Golden Hill LL; Fullerton | Honolulu LL; Honolulu |
| 2026 | Chandler National LL; Chandler | San Ramon Valley LL; Danville | Sweetwater Valley LL; Bonita | Kawaihau Community LL; Kapaʻa |

== LLWS results ==
As of the 2026 Little League World Series.

| Year | Champion | City | LLWS | Record |
|---|---|---|---|---|
| 2001 | Oceanside American LL | (California) Oceanside | U.S. semifinal | 3–1 |
| 2002 | Aptos LL | (California) Aptos | Group stage | 1–2 |
| 2003 | National LL | (Arizona) Chandler | U.S. semifinal | 3–1 |
| 2004 | Conejo Valley LL | (California) Thousand Oaks | Runner-up | 5–1 |
| 2005 | Rancho Buena Vista LL | (California) Vista | 3rd place | 5–1 |
| 2006 | Ahwatukee American LL | (Arizona) Phoenix | Group stage | 2–1 |
| 2007 | National LL | (Arizona) Chandler | U.S. semifinal | 2–2 |
| 2008 | Waipio LL | (Hawaii) Waipio | Champions | 6–0 |
| 2009 | Park View LL | (California) Chula Vista | Champions | 5–1 |
| 2010 | Waipio LL | (Hawaii) Waipahu | Runner-up | 5–2 |
| 2011 | Ocean View LL | (California) Huntington Beach | Champions | 5–1 |
| 2012 | Petaluma National LL | (California) Petaluma | 3rd place | 5–2 |
| 2013 | Eastlake LL | (California) Chula Vista | Runner-up | 4–1 |
| 2014 (Note: Mountain Ridge Little League of Las Vegas, Nevada, was retroactively given the U.S. title when Jackie Robinson West Little League from Chicago, Illinois, was found to have fielded ineligible players.) | Mountain Ridge LL | (Nevada) Las Vegas | Runner-up | 3–2 |
| 2015 | Sweetwater Valley LL | (California) Bonita | U.S. semifinal | 3–2 |
| 2016 | Park View LL | (California) Chula Vista | Round 2 | 1–2 |
| 2017 | Santa Margarita National LL | (California) Rancho Santa Margarita | Round 2 | 1–2 |
| 2018 | Honolulu LL | (Hawaii) Honolulu | Champions | 5–0 |
| 2019 | Central East Maui LL | (Hawaii) Wailuku | 4th place | 3–2 |
| 2020 | LLWS not held due to the COVID-19 pandemic | | | |
| 2021 (Note: Due to the COVID-19 pandemic, Little League International did not invite teams from outside the U.S. to the LLWS in 2021. Instead, the top two teams in each U.S. region qualified.) | Honolulu LL | (Hawaii) Honolulu | 3rd place | 4–1 |
| 2021 | Torrance LL | (California) Torrance | Round 4 | 2–2 |
| 2022 | Honolulu LL | (Hawaii) Honolulu | Champions | 6–0 |
| 2023 | El Segundo LL | (California) El Segundo | Champions | 6–1 |
| 2024 | Central East Maui LL | (Hawaii) Wailuku | Round 4 | 3–2 |
| 2025 | Honolulu LL | (Hawaii) Honolulu | Round 3 | 1–2 |
| 2026 | Sweetwater Valley LL | (California) Bonita | Round 1 | 0–2 |

=== Results by state ===
As of the 2026 Little League World Series. Italics indicates the state is no longer a member of the West Region.

| State | West Championships | LLWS Championships | Record in LLWS | PCT |
|---|---|---|---|---|
| Southern California | 11 | 3 | 40–17 | .702 |
| Hawaii | 8 | 3 | 33–9 | .786 |
| Arizona | 3 | 0 | 7–4 | .636 |
| Northern California | 2 | 0 | 6–4 | .600 |
| Nevada | 1 | 0 | 3–2 | .600 |
| Utah | 0 | 0 | 0–0 | – |
| Total | 25 | 6 | 89–36 | .712 |

== See also ==
- Little League World Series 1957–2000 (West Region)
- Little League World Series (Northwest Region)

West Region in other Little League divisions

- Intermediate League
- Junior League
- Senior League
- Big League
