= Little League World Series in Japan =

Japan Region
- Most recent season or competition: 2026 Little League World Series qualification
- Formerly: Far East Region; Asia Region
- Sport: Baseball
- Founded: 2007; 19 years ago
- Country: Japan
- Most recent champions: Joto Little League, Tokyo
- Most titles: Chōfu Little League, Chōfu, Tokyo (12)

Japan first participated in the Little League World Series in 1962. Between 1962 and 2000, Japan participated in the Far East Region of the LLWS. In 2001, the Far East Region was divided into the Asia Region and the Pacific Region. From 2001 to 2006, Japan competed in the Asia Region. In 2007, the Japan Region was created, so that the winner of the Japanese championship receives an automatic berth in the Series.

== Japan Championships ==
In 1967, the first All-Japan championship took place. Prior to 1967, Japanese teams participated in the Far East region in each year between 1962 and 1966. In 1969, the Far East Region conducted its first regional tournament, with teams from six nations. Kazuo Hayashi founded Little League Japan in 1964. His West Tokyo team was the very first Japanese team to win the Little League World Series, doing so in 1967. https://www.baseballjapan.org/system/prog/news.php?l=e&i=793

Year	Champion	City	Runner-up	City	Region	LLWS	Record
1961	Misawa	(Aomori Prefecture) Aomori			Pacific	DNQ	–
1962	Kunitachi	Tokyo			Far East	7th place	1–2
1963	Gyokusen	Tokyo			Far East	Withdrew	–
1964	Tachikawa	Tokyo			Far East	4th place	1–2
1965	Arakawa	Tokyo			Far East	6th place	1–2
1966	Wakayama	(Wakayama Prefecture) Wakayama			Far East	4th place	1–2
All-Japan Championship
1967	West Tokyo	Tokyo	Osaka Nishi	(Osaka Prefecture) Osaka	Far East	Champions	3–0
1968	Wakayama	(Wakayama Prefecture) Wakayama	Little Hawks	?	Far East	Champions	3–0
1969	Chōfu	(Tokyo) Chōfu	Little Hawks	?	Far East	DNQ	–
1970	Wakayama	(Wakayama Prefecture) Wakayama	Chōfu	(Tokyo) Chōfu	Far East	DNQ	–
1971	Chōfu	(Tokyo) Chōfu	Wakayama	(Wakayama Prefecture) Wakayama	Far East	DNQ	–
1972	Chōfu	(Tokyo) Chōfu	Izumi Otsu	(Shiga Prefecture) Otsu	Far East	DNQ	–
1973	Chōfu	(Tokyo) Chōfu	Sendai Minami	(Miyagi Prefecture) Sendai	Far East	DNQ	–
1974	Chōfu	(Tokyo) Chōfu	Nerima	Tokyo	Far East	DNQ	–
1975	Chōfu	(Tokyo) Chōfu	Tokyo Machida	Tokyo	Far East	Banned	–
1976	Chōfu	(Tokyo) Chōfu	Komae	Tokyo	Far East	Champions	3–0
1977	Chōfu	(Tokyo) Chōfu	Higashi Osaka	(Osaka Prefecture) Osaka	Far East	DNQ	–
1978	Amagasaki Kita	(Hyōgo Prefecture) Amagasaki	Suginami	Tokyo	Far East	DNQ	–
1979	Settsu	(Osaka Prefecture) Settsu	Sendai Chuo	(Miyagi Prefecture) Sendai	Far East	DNQ	–
1980	Suginami	Tokyo	Wakayama	(Wakayama Prefecture) Wakayama	Far East	DNQ	–
1981	Motomaki Chuo	(Kanagawa Prefecture) ?	Nakano Higashi	Tokyo	Far East	DNQ	–
1982	Chōfu	(Tokyo) Chōfu	Kohhoku	(Kanagawa Prefecture) Yokohama	Far East	DNQ	–
1983	Osaka Yodogawa	(Osaka Prefecture) Osaka	Asahi	(Kanagawa Prefecture) Yokohama	Far East	3rd place	2–1
1984	Taisho	(Osaka Prefecture) Osaka	Hamamatsu	(Shizuoka Prefecture) Hamamatsu	Far East	DNQ	–
1985	Hoya	Tokyo	Adachi Kita	Tokyo	Far East	DNQ	–
1986	Tokorozawa	(Saitama Prefecture) Tokorozawa	Ehime Nishi	(Ehime Prefecture) ?	Far East	DNQ	–
1987	Chōfu	(Tokyo) Chōfu	Aichi Iwakura	(Aichi Prefecture) Iwakura	Far East	DNQ	–
1988	Osaka Higashi	(Osaka Prefecture) Osaka	Nagoya Higashi	(Aichi Prefecture) Nagoya	Far East	DNQ	–
1989	Settsu	(Osaka Prefecture) Settsu	Chōfu	(Tokyo) Chōfu	Far East	DNQ	–
1990	Hadano	(Kanagawa Prefecture) Hadano	Takaishi	(Osaka Prefecture) Takaishi	Far East	DNQ	–
1991	Omiya	(Saitama Prefecture) Ōmiya	Takatsuki	(Osaka Prefecture) Takatsuki	Far East	DNQ	–
1992	Minato	Tokyo	Hasuda	(Saitama Prefecture) Hasuda	Far East	DNQ	–
1993	Sumida	Tokyo	Kumamoto Chuo	(Kumamoto Prefecture) Chūō	Far East	DNQ	–
1994	Edogawa Minami	Tokyo	Seya	(Kanagawa Prefecture) Yokohama	Far East	DNQ	–
1995	Izumisano	(Osaka Prefecture) Izumisano	Midori Chuo	Kanagawa	Far East	DNQ	–
1996	Matsusaka	(Mie Prefecture) Matsusaka	Hiratsuka	(Kanagawa Prefecture) Hiratsuka	Far East	DNQ	–
1997	Seya	(Kanagawa Prefecture) Yokohama	Takarazuka	(Hyōgo Prefecture) Takarazuka	Far East	3rd place	2–2
1998	Kashima	(Ibaraki Prefecture) Kashima	Seya	(Kanagawa Prefecture) Yokohama	Far East	Runner-up	3–2
1999	Hirakata	(Osaka Prefecture) Hirakata	Hyogo Harima	(Hyōgo Prefecture) Harima	Far East	Champions	4–1
2000	Musashi Fuchu	Tokyo	Kodaira	(Tokyo) Kodaira	Far East	3rd place	3–1
2001	Tokyo Kitasuna	Tokyo	Nagoya Kita	(Aichi Prefecture) Nagoya	Asia	Champions	5–1
2002	Sendai Higashi	(Miyagi Prefecture) Sendai	Takarazuka	(Hyōgo Prefecture) Takarazuka	Asia	Runner-up	5–1
2003	Musashi Fuchu	Tokyo	Chōfu	(Tokyo) Chōfu	Asia	Champions	6–0
2004	Sendai Higashi	(Miyagi Prefecture) Sendai	Tokyo Kitasuna	Tokyo	Asia	DNQ	–
2005	Chiba City	(Chiba Prefecture) Chiba	Gifu Tohno	(Gifu Prefecture) Gifu	Asia	4th place	4–2
2006	Kawaguchi	(Saitama Prefecture) Kawaguchi	Musashi Fuchu	Tokyo	Asia	Runner-up	5–1
2007	Tokyo Kitasuna	Tokyo	Hiratsuka	(Kanagawa Prefecture) Hiratsuka	Japan	Runner-up	4–1
2008	Edogawa Minami	Tokyo	Matsusaka	(Mie Prefecture) Matsusaka	Japan	3rd place	5–1
2009	Chiba City	(Chiba Prefecture) Chiba	Izumisano	(Osaka Prefecture) Izumisano	Japan	Quarterfinals	2–2
2010	Edogawa Minami	Tokyo	Hirosaki Aomori	(Aomori Prefecture) Hirosaki	Japan	Champions	5–0
2011	Hamamatsu Minami	(Shizuoka Prefecture) Hamamatsu	Seya	(Kanagawa Prefecture) Yokohama	Japan	Runner-up	5–2
2012	Tokyo Kitasuna	Tokyo	Matsusaka	(Mie Prefecture) Matsusaka	Japan	Champions	5–0
2013	Musashi Fuchū	Tokyo	Sendai Aoba	(Miyagi Prefecture) Sendai	Japan	Champions	5–0
2014	Tokyo Kitasuna	Tokyo	Toyonaka	(Osaka Prefecture) Toyonaka	Japan	3rd place	4–2
2015	Tokyo Kitasuna	Tokyo	Hachioji	Tokyo	Japan	Champions	5–0
2016	Chōfu	Tokyo	Sendai Higashi	(Miyagi Prefecture) Sendai	Japan	Round 1	1–2
2017	Tokyo Kitasuna	Tokyo	Chiba City	(Chiba Prefecture) Chiba	Japan	Champions	5–0
2018	Kawaguchi	(Saitama Prefecture) Kawaguchi	Nagasaki Minami	(Nagasaki Prefecture) Nagasaki	Japan	3rd place	4–2
2019	Chōfu	Tokyo	Ushiku	(Ibaraki Prefecture) Ushiku	Japan	3rd place	4–1
2020	Cancelled due to COVID-19 pandemic						
2021	Takarazuka	(Hyōgo Prefecture) Takarazuka	Fukaya City	(Saitama Prefecture) Fukaya	Japan	No Int'l teams	–
2022	Takarazuka	(Hyōgo Prefecture) Takarazuka	Hiroshima Aki	(Hiroshima Prefecture) Hiroshima	Japan	Round 2	0–2
2023	Musashi Fuchu	Tokyo	Shōnan	(Kanagawa Prefecture) Shōnan	Japan	Round 4	3–2
2024	Johoku	Tokyo	Joto	Tokyo	Japan	Int'l Semifinal	2–2
2025	Joto	Tokyo	Yohokama	(Kanagawa Prefecture) Yokohama	Japan	Round 4	2–2
2026	Joto	Tokyo	Chiba City	(Chiba Prefecture) Chiba	Japan	3rd place	6–2

== Summary ==
As of the 2026 Little League World Series.

Prefecture	JC	WS	Record	PCT
Tokyo	37	22	79–23	.775
(Osaka Prefecture) Osaka	7	2	6–2	.750
(Saitama Prefecture) Saitama	4	2	9–3	.750
(Wakayama Prefecture) Wakayama	3	2	4–2	.667
(Kanagawa Prefecture) Kanagawa	3	1	2–2	.500
(Hyōgo Prefecture) Hyogo	3	1	0–2	.000
(Chiba Prefecture) Chiba	2	2	6–4	.600
(Miyagi Prefecture) Miyagi	2	1	5–1	.833
(Shizuoka Prefecture) Shizuoka	1	1	5–2	.714
(Ibaraki Prefecture) Ibaraki	1	1	3–2	.600
(Mie Prefecture) Mie	1	0	–	–
(Aomori Prefecture) Aomori	1	0	–	–
Total	65	35	119–43	.735

== See also ==
- Baseball awards#World
- Little League World Series (Far East Region)
- Little League World Series (Asia-Pacific and Middle East Region)

Asia-Pacific Region in other Little League divisions

- Intermediate League
- Junior League
- Senior League
- Big League
