= 2004 Little League World Series qualification =

Children's baseball competition qualification

United States
- Great Lakes winner: Owensboro, Kentucky
- Mid-Atlantic winner: Preston, Maryland
- Midwest winner: Davenport, Iowa
- New England winner: Lincoln, Rhode Island
- Northwest winner: (Washington (state)) Redmond, Washington
- Southeast winner: Morganton, North Carolina
- Southwest winner: Richmond, Texas
- West winner: Thousand Oaks, California

International
- Asia winner: Kaohsiung, Taiwan
- Canada winner: (Canada) Ottawa, Ontario
- Caribbean winner: Willemstad, Curaçao
- Europe, Middle East & Africa winner: Kutno, Poland
- Latin America winner: Panama City, Panama
- Mexico winner: Guadalupe, Mexico
- Pacific winner: Saipan, Northern Mariana Islands
- Transatlantic winner: Dhahran, Saudi Arabia

Tournaments

Qualification for the 2004 Little League World Series took place in sixteen different parts of the world during July and August 2004, with formats and number of teams varying by region.

== United States ==
=== Great Lakes ===
The tournament took place in Indianapolis, Indiana from July 31 to August 9.

State	City	LL Organization	Record
Kentucky	Owensboro	Owensboro Southern	4–0
Ohio	Hamilton	West Side National	2–2
Indiana	Highland	Highland	2–2
Illinois	Mundelein	Mundelein National	2–2
Wisconsin	Appleton	Appleton Einstein	1–3
Michigan	Grand Rapids	Western	1–3

Semi-finals
August 11
Ohio	2
Indiana	6
August 11
Kentucky	8
Illinois	2

Final
August 13
Indiana	0
Kentucky	3

=== Mid-Atlantic Region ===
The tournament took place in Bristol, Connecticut from August 6–15.

State	City	LL Organization	Record
New York	Colonie	Colonie	3–1
Washington, D.C.		Capitol City	3–1
Pennsylvania	Hilltown	Deep Run Valley	2–2
Maryland	Preston	South Caroline	2–2
Delaware	Wilmington	Capitol	2–2
New Jersey	Hamilton	HTRBA	0–4

Semi-finals
August 12
(Washington, D.C.) Washington, D.C.	0
Maryland	1
August 12
(New York (state)) New York	1
Pennsylvania	4

Final
August 15
Maryland	4
Pennsylvania	1

=== Midwest ===
The tournament took place in Indianapolis, Indiana from July 31-August 9.

State	City	LL Organization	Record
Iowa	Davenport	Davenport Northwest	3–1
Minnesota	Robbinsdale	Robbinsdale	3–1
South Dakota	Rapid City	Harney	3–1
Missouri	Columbia	Daniel Boone National	2–2
Nebraska	Blair	Blair	1–3
Kansas	Galena	Galena	0–4

Semi-finals
August 6
Minnesota	4
South Dakota	0
August 6
Iowa	5
Missouri	4

Final
August 8
Minnesota	4
Iowa	5

=== New England ===
The tournament was held in Bristol, Connecticut from August 6–15.

State	City	LL Organization	Record
New Hampshire	Portsmouth	Portsmouth	3–1
Rhode Island	Lincoln	Lincoln	3–1
Massachusetts	Worcester	Jesse Burkett	2–2
Vermont	Essex Junction	Essex Junction	2–2
Connecticut	Berlin	Berlin	2–2
Maine	Biddeford	East Biddeford	0–4

Semi-finals
August 12
New Hampshire	11
Vermont	9
August 12 - 4 innings
Rhode Island	10
Massachusetts	0

Final
August 14
New Hampshire	0
Rhode Island	3

=== Northwest ===
The tournament was held in San Bernardino, California from August 1–12

State	City	LL Organization	Record
Alaska	Anchorage	Dimond-West	3–1
Idaho	Eagle	West Valley	3–1
Washington	Redmond	Redmond North	2–2
Oregon	Beaverton	Murrayhill	2–2
Hawaii	Kihei	Kihei	2–2
Montana	Missoula	Missoula Southside	1–3

Semi-finals
August 9 - 10 innings
Idaho	10
Oregon	7
August 9
Alaska	7
(Washington (state)) Washington	8

Final
August 11
Idaho	3
(Washington (state)) Washington	6

=== Southeast ===
The tournament took place in St. Petersburg, Florida from August 1–7.

Pool A
State	City	LL Organization	Record
North Carolina	Morganton	Morganton	3–0
Virginia	Richmond	Tuckahoe National	2–1
South Carolina	Fort Mill	TCFM Yellow Jacket	1–2
West Virginia	Ripley	Ripley	0–3

Pool B
State	City	LL Organization	Record
(Georgia (U.S. state)) Georgia	Columbus	Columbus Northern	2–1
Florida	Cocoa	Cocoa	2–1
Tennessee	Hermitage	Donelson National	1–2
Alabama	Mobile	Westside	1–2

Semi-finals
August 5
(Georgia (U.S. state)) Georgia	8
Virginia	7
August 5
Florida	0
North Carolina	7

Final
August 7
(Georgia (U.S. state)) Georgia	4
North Carolina	7

=== Southwest ===
The tournament took place in Waco, Texas from August 5–10.

Pool A
State	City	LL Organization	Record
Texas West	San Antonio	McAllister Park American	2–1
Mississippi	Ocean Springs	Ocean Springs	2–1
New Mexico	Carlsbad	Shorthorn	2–1
Oklahoma	Tulsa	John Hess	0–3

Pool B
State	City	LL Organization	Record
Texas East	Richmond	Lamar National	3–0
Arkansas	Bryant	Bryant Athletic	2–1
Louisiana	Lake Charles	South Lake Charles	1–2
Colorado	Colorado Springs	Academy	0–3

Semi-finals
August 8
Texas West	5
Arkansas	12
August 8
Texas East	8
Mississippi	0

Final
August 10 - 7 innings
Arkansas	2
Texas East	3

=== West ===
The tournament took place in San Bernardino from August 1–12.

State	City	LL Organization	Record
Southern California	Thousand Oaks	Conejo Valley East	4–0
Nevada	Henderson	Green Valley	3–1
Arizona	Glendale	Deer Valley	3–1
Northern California	Visalia	Visalia National	2–2
Wyoming	Gillette	Gillette	0–4
Utah	Taylorsville	Taylorsville	0–4

Semi-finals
August 10
Nevada	15
Arizona	2
August 10
Southern California	3
Northern California	1

Final
August 12
Nevada	5
Southern California	8

== International ==
=== Asia ===
The tournament took place in Hagåtña, Guam from July 23–28.

Country	City	LL Organization	Record
Japan	Sendai	Sendai Higashi	3–0
Taiwan	Kaohsiung	Shou-Tien	2–1
Hong Kong		Hong Kong	1–2
South Korea			0–3

Final
July 28
(Taiwan) Kaohsiung	7
(Japan) Sendai	5

=== Canada ===
The tournament was held in Brossard, Quebec from August 7–14.

Province	City	LL Organization	Record
British Columbia	Langley	Langley	5–0
Ontario	Ottawa	East Nepean	3–2
Saskatchewan	Regina	North Regina	3–2
Nova Scotia	Sydney Mines	Sydney Mines	2–3
Quebec	Montreal	Notre-Dame-de-Grâce	2–3
Quebec (Host)	Brossard	LNDB Brossard	0–5

Tie-Breaker
4	(Quebec) Montréal	3
5	(Nova Scotia) Sydney Mines	0

Semi-finals
August 14
(British Columbia) Langley	0
(Quebec) Montréal	1
August 14
(Saskatchewan) Regina	3
(Ontario) Ottawa	6

Final
August 14
(Quebec) Montréal	1
(Ontario) Ottawa	4

=== Caribbean ===
The tournament took place in Oranjestad, Aruba from July 18–24.

Pool A
Country	City	LL Organization	Record
Curaçao	Willemstad	Pabao	4–0
Aruba	San Nicolaas	Aruba South	3–1
Dominican Republic	Santo Domingo	Virgilio Jimenez	2–2
British Virgin Islands	Road Town	BVI	1–3
Sint Maarten	Philipsburg	St. Maarten	0–4

Pool B
Region	City	LL Organization	Record
Aruba	Oranjestad	Aruba North	4–0
(United States Virgin Islands) U.S. Virgin Islands	St. Thomas	Elrod Hendricks West	3–1
Puerto Rico	Manatí	José A. Rodriguez	2–2
Bonaire	Kralendijk	Bonaire	1–3
Bahamas	Freeport	Grand Bahamas Junior	0–4

Semi-finals
July 23
Curaçao	3
(United States Virgin Islands) U.S. Virgin Islands	0
July 23
(Aruba) Oranjestad	6
(Aruba) San Nicolaas	0

Final
July 24
Curaçao	6
(Aruba) Oranjestad	0
Third place
July 24
(United States Virgin Islands) U.S. Virgin Islands	0
(Aruba) Oranjestad	6

=== Europe, Middle East and Africa ===
The tournament took place in Kutno, Poland from July 26-August 2.

Pool A
Country	City	LL Organization	Record
Poland	Kutno	Kutno	4–0
Lithuania	Vilnius	Vilnius	3–1
Austria	Vienna	AIBC	2–2
Kazakhstan	Almaty	Almaty	1–3
Romania	Botoșani	CSS-Electro '89 Botoșani	0–4

Pool B
Region	City	LL Organization	Record
Netherlands	Utrecht	Windmills Utrecht	5–0
France	Île-de-France	Île-de-France	4–1
Bulgaria	Sofia	Bulgarian American	3–2
Moldova	Tiraspol	Kvint	2–3
Slovenia	Ljubljana	Ljubljuna	1–4
Scotland	Glasgow	Glasgow	0–5

Quarterfinals
3A	Austria	8
2B	France	5
3B	Bulgaria	9
2A	Lithuania	15

Semi-finals
1A	Poland	22
2B	Austria	4
1B	Netherlands	1
2A	Lithuania	3

Championship
1A	Poland	7
2A	Lithuania	0
Third place
2B	Austria	2
1B	Netherlands	10

=== Latin America ===
The tournament took place in Panama City, Panama from July 25–31

Country	City	LL Organization	Record
Venezuela	Los Puertos de Altagracia	Altagracia	3–1
Panama	David	David Doleguita	3–1
Colombia	Cartagena	Comfenalco	3–1
Panama (host)	Panama City	Curundu	1–3
Ecuador	Guayaquil	C. Unidas Miraflores	0–4

Semi-finals
July 30
Panama City	4
(Colombia) Cartagena	3
July 30
(Venezuela) Altagracia	1
(Panama) David	4

Final
July 31
Panama City	1
(Panama) David	0
Third place
July 31 Not played - rained out
(Colombia) Cartagena
(Venezuela) Altagracia

=== Mexico ===
The tournament took place in Monterrey, Nuevo León from July 3–12.

==== Phase 1 ====
Pool A
City	LL Organization	Record
Guadalupe, Nuevo León	Linda Vista	4–1
(Tamaulipas) Matamoros	Matamoros	4–1
(Chihuahua (state)) Juárez	El Granjero	2–3
(Sinaloa) Los Mochis	Teodoro Higuera	2–3
(Coahuila) Monclova	Carlos Segura	2–3
(Mexico City) México, D.F.	Olmeca	1–4

Pool B
City	LL Organization	Record
Guadalupe, Nuevo León	Epitacio "Mala" Torres	5–0
(Mexico City) México, D.F.	Maya	3–2
(Sonora) Guaymas	Sector Pesca	3–2
(Tamaulipas) Nuevo Laredo	Oriente	2–3
San Luis Potosí	San Luis Potosí	2–3
(Chihuahua (state)) Delicias	Cura Trillo	0–5

==== Phase 2 ====
City	LL Organization	Record
Guadalupe, Nuevo León	Epitacio "Mala" Torres	4–1
Guadalupe, Nuevo León	Linda Vista	3–2
(Mexico City) México, D.F.	Maya	3–2
(Sonora) Guaymas	Sector Pesca	2–3
(Tamaulipas) Matamoros	Matamoros	2–3
(Chihuahua (state)) Juárez	El Granjero	1–4

Semi-finals
July 11
Guadalupe Mala Torres	6
(Sonora) Guaymas	0
July 11
Guadalupe Linda Vista	7
(Mexico City) Maya	1

Final
July 12
Guadalupe Linda Vista	4
Guadalupe Mala Torres	0
Third place
July 12
Maya	6
(Sonora) Guaymas	0

=== Pacific ===
The tournament took place in Hagåtña, Guam from July 23–29.

Country	City	LL Organization	Record
Guam	Mangilao	Central East	4–0
Indonesia	Jakarta	Jakarta	3–1
Philippines			0–3
Northern Mariana Islands	Saipan	Saipan	1–3

Final
July 28
(Indonesia) Jakarta	3
(Northern Mariana Islands) Saipan	4

=== Transatlantic ===
The tournament was held in Kutno, Poland from August 5–14.

Country	City	LL Organization	Record
Saudi Arabia	Dhahran	Arabian-American	6–0
Germany	Rammstein	Ramstein American	5–1
England	London	London Area Youth	4–2
Italy	Naples	Naples Navy Base	2–4
Spain	Madrid	Madrid	2–4
Belgium	Brussels	SHAPE/Waterloo	1–5
Germany/Netherlands		Geilenkirchen-American/ Brunssum/Schinnen	1–5

Semi-finals
10 August
(Saudi Arabia) Dharan	22
(Italy) Naples	0
10 August
(Germany) Rammstein	6
(England) London	2

Final
11 August
(Saudi Arabia) Dharan	8
(Germany) Rammstein	3
Third place
11 August
(Italy) Naples	3
England	8
