= 2003 Little League World Series qualification =

Children's baseball competition qualification

United States
- Great Lakes winner: Tallmadge, Ohio
- Mid-Atlantic winner: Wilmington, Delaware
- Midwest winner: Eldridge, Iowa
- New England winner: Saugus, Massachusetts
- Northwest winner: (Washington (state)) Richland, Washington
- Southeast winner: Boynton Beach, Florida
- Southwest winner: Richmond, Texas
- West winner: Chandler, Arizona

International
- Asia winner: Tokyo, Japan
- Canada winner: (Canada) Glace Bay, Nova Scotia
- Caribbean winner: Willemstad, Curaçao
- Europe, Middle East & Africa winner: Moscow, Russia
- Latin America winner: Zulia, Venezuela
- Mexico winner: Mexico City, Mexico
- Pacific winner: Hagåtña, Guam
- Transatlantic winner: Dhahran, Saudi Arabia

Tournaments

Qualification for the 2003 Little League World Series took place in sixteen different parts of the world during July and August 2003, with formats and number of teams varying by region.

== United States ==
=== Great Lakes ===
The tournament took place in Indianapolis, Indiana from August 1–10.

| State | City | LL Organization | Record |
|---|---|---|---|
| Ohio | Tallmadge | Tallmadge | 4–0 |
| Michigan | Midland | Midland Northeast | 3–1 |
| Kentucky | Owensboro | Owensboro Southern | 3–1 |
| Wisconsin | Wausau | Wausau Western | 1–3 |
| Illinois | Moline | Moline National | 1–3 |
| Indiana | Anderson | Brooklyn | 0–4 |

Semi-finals
August 8
Ohio | 16
Wisconsin | 4
August 8
Michigan | 11
Kentucky | 7

Final
August 9
Ohio | 7
Michigan | 1

=== Mid-Atlantic Region ===
The tournament took place in Bristol, Connecticut from August 2–12.

| State | City | LL Organization | Record |
|---|---|---|---|
| Pennsylvania | Collegeville | Lower Perkiomen | 4–0 |
| Delaware | Wilmington | Naamans | 3–1 |
| Maryland | Salisbury | West Salisbury | 2–2 |
| New York | Ramapo | Ramapo | 1–2 |
| New Jersey | Freehold Township | Freehold Township American | 1–2 |
| Washington, D.C. | | Capitol City | 0–4 |

Semi-finals
August 9
Pennsylvania | 3
Maryland | 1
August 9
Delaware | 12
(New York (state)) New York | 2

Final
August 12
Pennsylvania | 3
Delaware | 7

=== Midwest ===
The tournament took place in Indianapolis, Indiana from August 1–10.

| State | City | LL Organization | Record |
|---|---|---|---|
| Iowa | Eldridge | North Scott | 3–1 |
| South Dakota | Rapid City | Canyon Lake | 3–1 |
| Minnesota | Coon Rapids | Coon Rapids National | 3–1 |
| Nebraska | Omaha | Grover | 2–2 |
| Kansas | Girard | Girard | 1–3 |
| Missouri | Higginsville | La Co Mo Central | 0–4 |

Semi-finals
August 8
Iowa | 17
Nebraska | 4
August 8
South Dakota | 9
Minnesota | 6

Final
August 10
Iowa | 5
South Dakota | 1

=== New England ===
The tournament was held in Bristol, Connecticut from August 2–11.

| State | City | LL Organization | Record |
|---|---|---|---|
| Massachusetts | Saugus | Saugus American | 4–0 |
| Rhode Island | Lincoln | Lincoln | 3–1 |
| Maine | Augusta | Augusta West | 2–2 |
| Connecticut | Stamford | North Stamford | 2–2 |
| Vermont | South Burlington | South Burlington | 1–3 |
| New Hampshire | Rye | Rye | 0–4 |

Semi-finals
August 9
Massachusetts | 10
Connecticut | 0
August 9
Rhode Island | 1
Maine | 2

Final
August 11
Massachusetts | 4
Maine | 0

=== Northwest ===
The tournament was held in San Bernardino, California from August 2–11.

| State | City | LL Organization | Record |
|---|---|---|---|
| Hawaii | Pearl City | Pearl City | 4–0 |
| Washington | Richland | Richland National | 3–1 |
| Oregon | Beaverton | Murrayhill | 3–1 |
| Idaho | Boise | East Boise American | 1–3 |
| Montana | Billings | Boulder Arrowhead | 1–3 |
| Alaska | Anchorage | Dimond-West | 0–4 |

Semi-finals
August 9
Hawaii | 6
Idaho | 3
August 9
(Washington (state)) Washington | 4
Oregon | 2

Final
August 11
Hawaii | 0
(Washington (state)) Washington | 5

=== Southeast ===
The tournament took place in St. Petersburg, Florida from August 3–9.

Pool A
| State | City | LL Organization | Record |
|---|---|---|---|
| Virginia | Springfield | West Springfield American | 3–0 |
| North Carolina | Wilmington | Wilmington | 1–2 |
| South Carolina | Gaffney | Gaffney American | 1–2 |
| West Virginia | Hedgesville | Hedgesville | 1–2 |

Pool B
| State | City | LL Organization | Record |
|---|---|---|---|
| Florida | Boynton Beach | East Boynton Beach | 3–0 |
| (Georgia (U.S. state)) Georgia | Atlanta | Buckhead | 2–1 |
| Tennessee | Johnson City | Johnson City National | 1–2 |
| Alabama | Russellville | Russellville | 0–3 |

Semi-finals
August 7
Virginia | 3
(Georgia (U.S. state)) Georgia | 7
August 7
Florida | 5
North Carolina | 0

Final
August 9
(Georgia (U.S. state)) Georgia | 0
Florida | 4

=== Southwest ===
The tournament took place in Waco, Texas from August 4–10.

Pool A
| State | City | LL Organization | Record |
|---|---|---|---|
| Arkansas | Bryant | Bryant Athletic | 3–0 |
| Louisiana | Lake Charles | South Lake Charles | 2–1 |
| Texas West | Odessa | Jim Parker | 1–2 |
| Mississippi | Picayune | P.Y.A.A. | 0–3 |

Pool B
| State | City | LL Organization | Record |
|---|---|---|---|
| Texas East | Richmond | Lamar National | 3–0 |
| Colorado | Colorado Springs | Academy | 2–1 |
| New Mexico | Artesia | Artesia | 1–2 |
| Oklahoma | Tulsa | Tulsa National | 0–3 |

Semi-finals
August 8
Arkansas | 7
Colorado | 6
August 8
Texas East | 1
Louisiana | 0

Final
August 10
Arkansas | 3
Texas East | 5

=== West ===
The tournament took place in San Bernardino from August 1–12.

| State | City | LL Organization | Record |
|---|---|---|---|
| Arizona | Chandler | Chandler National | 4–0 |
| Nevada | Henderson | Green Valley | 2–2 |
| Southern California | Rancho Cucamonga | Vineyard | 2–2 |
| Wyoming | Laramie | Laramie | 1–3 |
| Northern California | Granite Bay | Lakeside | 1–3 |

Semi-finals
August 10
Arizona | 7
Wyoming | 2
August 10
Nevada | 2
Southern California | 14

Final
August 12
Arizona | 2
Southern California | 0

== International ==
=== Asia ===
The tournament took place in Rota, Northern Mariana Islands from July 28–August 1.

| Country | City | LL Organization | Record |
|---|---|---|---|
| Japan | Tokyo | Musashi-Fuchu | 3–0 |
| South Korea | | | 2–1 |
| Taiwan | | | 1–2 |
| Hong Kong | | | 0–3 |

| Final |
| August 1 |
| Japan | 6 |
| South Korea | 2 |

=== Canada ===
The tournament was held in Sydney, Nova Scotia from August 2–9.

| Province | City | LL Organization | Record |
|---|---|---|---|
| Nova Scotia | Glace Bay | Glace Bay | 5–0 |
| Ontario | Toronto | High Park | 4–1 |
| Saskatchewan | Moose Jaw | Moose Jaw | 3–2 |
| Nova Scotia (Host) | Sydney | Sydney | 2–3 |
| British Columbia | White Rock | White Rock South Surrey | 1–4 |
| (Quebec) Québec | Salaberry-de-Valleyfield | Valleyfield | 0–5 |

Semi-finals
August 8
(Nova Scotia) Glace Bay | 3
(Nova Scotia) Sydney | 0
August 8
Saskatchewan | 4
Ontario | 3

Final
August 9
(Nova Scotia) Glace Bay | 2
Saskatchewan | 0

=== Caribbean ===
The tournament took place in Mayaguez, Puerto Rico from July 20–26.

Pool A
| Country | City | LL Organization | Record |
|---|---|---|---|
| Curaçao | Willemstad | Pabao | 4–0 |
| Aruba | Santa Cruz | Aruba Central | 3–1 |
| United States Virgin Islands | Saint Croix | Elmo Plasket East | 2–2 |
| Bahamas | Freeport | Grand Bahamas Junior | 1–3 |
| Puerto Rico (Host) | Mayagüez | Wilfredo Ramirez | 0–4 |

Pool B
| Region | City | LL Organization | Record |
|---|---|---|---|
| Puerto Rico | Manuabo | Rosario Y. Cardona | 3–0 |
| Dominican Republic | Santo Domingo | Virgilio Jimenez | 2–1 |
| British Virgin Islands | Road Town | BVI | 1–2 |
| Sint Maarten | Philipsburg | Sint Maarten | 0–3 |

Semi-finals
July 25
Curaçao | 4
Dominican Republic | 2
July 25
(Puerto Rico) Manuabo | 4
Aruba | 6

Final
July 26
Curaçao | 6
Aruba | 2
Third place
July 26
Dominican Republic | 4
(Puerto Rico) Manuabo | 6

=== Europe, Middle East and Africa ===
The tournament took place in Kutno, Poland from July 15–22.

Pool A
| Country | City | LL Organization | Record |
|---|---|---|---|
| Poland | Kutno | Kutno | 4–0 |
| South Africa | Durban | Kwazulu Natal | 3–1 |
| Austria | Vienna | AIBC | 2–2 |
| Lithuania | Vilnius | Vilnius | 1–3 |
| Ireland | Dublin | Dublin | 0–4 |

Pool B
| Region | City | LL Organization | Record |
|---|---|---|---|
| Russia | Moscow | Khovrino | 4–0 |
| Netherlands | Rotterdam | Rotterdam | 3–1 |
| France | Roussillon | Roussillon | 2–2 |
| Bulgaria | Dupnitsa | Dupnitsa | 1–3 |
| Belarus | Brest | Brest Zubrs | 0–4 |

Quarterfinals
3A | Austria | 3
2B | Netherlands | 5
3B | France | 2
2A | South Africa | 3

Semi-finals
1A | Poland | 5
2B | Netherlands | 7
1B | Russia | 9
2A | South Africa | 1

Championship
2B | Netherlands | 0
1B | Russia | 18
Third place
1A | Poland | 2
2A | South Africa | 5

=== Latin America ===
The tournament took place in Mayaguez, Puerto Rico from July 20–26.

| Country | City | LL Organization | Record |
|---|---|---|---|
| Panama | Panama City | Curundu | 2–2 |
| Venezuela | Los Puertos | Altagracia | 2–2 |
| Colombia | Cartagena | Comfenalco | 2–2 |

| Final |
| July 26 |
| Panama | 2 |
| Venezuela | 3 |

=== Mexico ===
The tournament took place in Hermosillo, Sonora from July 3–12.

==== Phase 1 ====
Pool A
| State | City | LL Organization | Record |
|---|---|---|---|
| Sonora | Guaymas | Sector Pesca | 4–1 |
| Nuevo León | San Pedro Garza García | Sierra Madre | 4–1 |
| (Mexico City) México D.F. | Mexico City | Olmeca | 3–2 |
| (Chihuahua (state)) Chihuahua | Ciudad Cuauhtémoc | Reforma | 2–3 |
| Tamaulipas | Matamoros | Villa del Refugio | 1–4 |
| Coahuila | Monclova | Club 8-80 | 1–4 |

Pool B
| State | City | LL Organization | Record |
|---|---|---|---|
| Nuevo León | San Nicolás de los Garza | Cuauhtemoc | 4–1 |
| San Luis Potosí | San Luis Potosí | San Luis A.C. | 3–2 |
| Tamaulipas | Matamoros | Matamoros | 3–2 |
| Jalisco | Tlaquepaque | Sutaj Tlaquepaque | 2–3 |
| Sonora (Host) | Hermosillo | Amistad y Deporte | 2–3 |
| (Chihuahua (state)) Chihuahua | Ciudad Juárez | El Granjero | 1–4 |

==== Phase 2 ====
| State | City | LL Organization | Record |
|---|---|---|---|
| Sonora | Guaymas | Sector Pesca | 4–1 |
| Nuevo León | San Pedro Garza García | Sierra Madre | 3–2 |
| (Mexico City) México D.F. | Mexico City | Olmeca | 3–2 |
| Nuevo León | San Nicolás de los Garza | Cuauhtemoc | 3–2 |
| Tamaulipas | Matamoros | Matamoros | 2–3 |
| San Luis Potosí | San Luis Potosí | San Luis A.C. | 0–5 |

Semi-finals
July 20
Sonora | 6
San Nicolás de los Garza | 0
July 20
San Pedro Garza García | 1
(Mexico City) Mexico D.F. | 2

Final
July 20
Sonora | 2
(Mexico City) Mexico D.F. | 3

=== Pacific ===
The tournament took place in Rota, Northern Mariana Islands from July 28–August 1.

| Country | Record |
|---|---|
| Guam | 3–0 |
| Northern Mariana Islands | 2–1 |
| Indonesia | 1–2 |
| Philippines | 0–3 |

| Final |
| August 1 |
| Guam | 12 |
| Northern Mariana Islands | 0 |

=== Transatlantic ===
The tournament was held in Kutno, Poland from July 15–23.

| Country | City | LL Organization | Record |
|---|---|---|---|
| Saudi Arabia | Dhahran | Arabian-American | 7–0 |
| Belgium | Brussels | SHAPE/Waterloo | 5–2 |
| Germany | Ramstein-Miesenbach | Ramstein | 5–2 |
| England | London | London Area Youth | 4–3 |
| Italy | Naples | Naples | 3–4 |
| Spain | Rota | Rota | 3–4 |
| Austria | Vienna | AIBC | 1–6 |
| Netherlands | Brunssum/Schinnen | Brunssum/Schinnen | 0–7 |

Semi-finals
July 22
Saudi Arabia | 4
England | 0
July 22
Belgium | 4
Germany | 5

Final
July 23
Saudi Arabia | 8
Germany | 0
Third place
July 23
England | 4
Belgium | 3
