= 2006 Little League World Series qualification =

Children's baseball competition qualification

United States
- Great Lakes winner: Lemont, Illinois
- Mid-Atlantic winner: (New York (state)) Staten Island, New York
- Midwest winner: Columbia, Missouri
- New England winner: Portsmouth, New Hampshire
- Northwest winner: Beaverton, Oregon
- Southeast winner: (Georgia (U.S. state)) Columbus, Georgia
- Southwest winner: Lake Charles, Louisiana
- West winner: Phoenix, Arizona

International
- Asia winner: (Japan) Kawaguchi City, Saitama
- Canada winner: (Canada) Surrey, British Columbia
- Caribbean winner: Willemstad, Curaçao
- Europe, Middle East & Africa winner: Moscow, Russia
- Latin America winner: Barquisimeto, Venezuela
- Mexico winner: (Mexico) Matamoros, Tamaulipas
- Pacific winner: Saipan, Northern Mariana Islands
- Transatlantic winner: Dhahran, Saudi Arabia

Tournaments

Qualification for the 2006 Little League World Series took place in sixteen different parts of the world during July and August 2006, with formats and number of teams varying by region.

== United States ==
=== Great Lakes ===
State	City	LL Organization	Record
Kentucky	Owensboro	Owensboro Southern	3–1
Indiana	New Castle	New Castle	3–1
Ohio	Hamilton	West Side	2–2
Illinois	Lemont	Lemont	2–2
Michigan	Mount Pleasant	Union Township Kids	2–2
Wisconsin	Appleton	Einstein	0–4

Semi-finals
August 11
Kentucky	1
Illinois	8
August 11
Indiana	7
Ohio	5

Final
August 13
Illinois	3
Indiana	0

=== Midwest ===
State	City	LL Organization	Record
Missouri	Columbia	Daniel Boone National	4–0
Iowa	Bloomfield	Davis County	3–1
Minnesota	Coon Rapids	Coon Rapids National	2–2
Nebraska	Grand Island	Grand Island National	2–2
South Dakota	Rapid City	Harney	1–3
Kansas	Galena	Galena	0–4

Semi-finals
August 10
Iowa	3
Minnesota	0
August 11
Missouri	12
Nebraska	5

Final
August 12
Iowa	0
Missouri	2

=== Mid-Atlantic ===
State	City	LL Organization	Record
New Jersey	Livingston	Livingston American	4–0
New York	Staten Island	Mid-Island	3–1
Maryland	Preston	South Caroline	3–1
Delaware	Wilmington	Naamans	1–3
Pennsylvania	Butler Township	Butler Township	1–3
Washington, D.C.		Capitol City	0–4

Semi-finals
August 11 (7 innings)
(New York (state)) New York	2
Maryland	1
August 11
New Jersey	16
Delaware	3

Final
August 14
(New York (state)) New York	2
New Jersey	1

=== New England ===
State	City	LL Organization	Record
Massachusetts	Peabody	Peabody Western	3–1
New Hampshire	Portsmouth	Portsmouth	3–1
Vermont	Colchester	Colchester	2–2
Connecticut	Glastonbury	Glastonbury American	2–2
Maine	Yarmouth	Yarmouth	1–3
Rhode Island	Lincoln	Lincoln	1–3

Semi-finals
August 11 Forfeit: VT failed to use all players
New Hampshire	6
Vermont	0
August 11
Massachusetts	2
Connecticut	3

Final
August 13
New Hampshire	3
Connecticut	0

=== Northwest ===
State	City	LL Organization	Record
Oregon	Beaverton	Murrayhill	4–0
Washington	Kent	Kent	3–1
Alaska	Anchorage	Dimond-West	2–2
Montana	Missoula	Missoula Southside	2–2
Idaho	Boise	North Boise	1–3
Wyoming	Laramie	Laramie	0–4

Semi-finals
August 11
(Washington (state)) Washington	0
Alaska	1
August 11
Oregon	10
Montana	8

Final
August 13 (7 innings)
Alaska	4
Oregon	5

=== Southeast ===
Pool A
State	City	LL Organization	Record
North Carolina	Greenville	Tar Heel	3–0
Alabama	Mobile	Cottage Hill	1–2
South Carolina	Fort Mill	TCFM Yellow Jacket	1–2
Virginia	Richmond	Tuckahoe National	1–2

Pool B
State	City	LL Organization	Record
(Georgia (U.S. state)) Georgia	Columbus	Columbus Northern	3–0
Florida	Dunedin	Greater Dunedin	2–1
Tennessee	Columbia	Columbia American	1–2
West Virginia	Bridgeport	Bridgeport	0–3

Semi-finals
August 9
(Georgia (U.S. state)) Georgia	11
Alabama	0
August 9
North Carolina	2
Florida	4

Final
August 11
(Georgia (U.S. state)) Georgia	5
Florida	0

=== Southwest ===
Pool A
State	City	LL Organization	Record
Mississippi	D'Iberville	D'Iberville	2–1
Texas East	Groves	Groves National	2–1
Texas West	Lubbock	Lubbock Western	2–1
Oklahoma	Ottawa County	Northeast Oklahoma	0–3

Pool B
State	City	LL Organization	Record
Louisiana	Lake Charles	South Lake Charles	3–0
Arkansas	Mountain Home	Mountain Home	2–1
New Mexico	Carlsbad	Shorthorn	1–2
Colorado	Colorado Springs	Academy	0–3

Semifinals 1 & 2
A1	Mississippi	9
B2	Arkansas	8
A2	Texas East	4
A3	Texas West	6

Semifinal 3
A3	Texas West	2
B1	Louisiana	9

Final
A1	Mississippi	0
B1	Louisiana	1

=== West ===
State	City	LL Organization	Record
Northern California	Fresno	River Park	4–0
Arizona	Phoenix	Ahwautakee American	3–1
Hawaii	Waipahu	Waipio	2–2
Nevada	Las Vegas	Lone Mountain	2–2
Southern California	Northridge	Northridge City	1–3
Utah	Santa Clara	Snow Canyon	0–4

Semi-finals
August 10
Arizona	8
Hawaii	3
August 10
Northern California	8
Nevada	4

Final
August 12
Arizona	11
Northern California	3

== International ==
=== Asia ===
Country	City	LL Organization	Record
Japan	Kawaguchi	Kawaguchi City	5–0
Taiwan	Taitung	Fong-Nien	4–1
China	Guangzhou	Huangpu	2–3
Hong Kong	Causeway Bay	Hong Kong	2–3
South Korea			2–3
Thailand	Chiang Mai	Sanuk	0–5

=== Canada ===
Province	City	LL Organization	Record
British Columbia (Host)	Surrey	Whalley	5–0
Nova Scotia	Glace Bay	Glace Bay	4–1
British Columbia	Coquitlam	Coquitlam	2–3
Ontario	Nepean	East	2–3
Saskatchewan	Saskatoon	Riverside Kiwanis	2–3
Quebec	Montreal	Notre-Dame-de-Grâce	0–5

Tiebreaker game
June 26
Saskatchewan	4
Ontario	6

Semifinals 1 & 2
2	Nova Scotia	5
1	British Columbia (Host)	6
4	Ontario	12
3	British Columbia	7

Semifinal 3
4	Ontario	7
2	Nova Scotia	6

Final
1	British Columbia (Host)	10
4	Ontario	0

=== Caribbean ===
Pool A
Country	City	LL Organization	Record
Curaçao	Willemstad	Pabao	4–0
Netherlands Antilles	Bonaire	Bonaire	3–1
Aruba	Oranjestad	Aruba North	2–2
Puerto Rico	Vega Baja	Jaime Collazo	1–3
Jamaica	Kingston	Bayside	0–4

Pool B
Region	City	LL Organization	Record
United States Virgin Islands	St. Thomas	Elrod Hendricks	3–0
Puerto Rico	Yabucoa	Juan A. Biblioni	3–1
Dominican Republic	Moca	Antonio Concepción	2–2
Bahamas	Nassau	Freedom Farm Baseball	1–3
Sint Maarten	Philipsburg	St. Maarten	0–3

Semi finals July 28, 2006
A2	Netherlands Antilles	1
B1	(United States Virgin Islands) USVI	3
B2	Puerto Rico B	0
A1	Curaçao	8

Finals; July 29, 2006
Curaçao	14
(United States Virgin Islands) USVI	3
Third place
Puerto Rico B	14
Netherlands Antilles	3

=== Europe, Middle East, and Africa ===
Pool A
Country	City	LL Organization	Record
Russia	Moscow	Brateevo	6–0
Austria	Vienna	AIBC	4–1
Italy	Verona	Veneto	3–2
Netherlands	Apeldoorn	Apeldoorn	2–3
Georgia	Tbilisi	Georgia YMCA	1–3
Belarus	Brest	Brest Zubrs	1–4
Slovenia	Ljubljana	Ljubljana	1–5

Pool B
Region	City	LL Organization	Record
Germany	Mannheim	Baden-Württemberg	5–0
Moldova	Tiraspol	Kvint	4–1
Poland	Kutno	Kutno	2–2
Ukraine	Kirovograd	Kirovograd-Center	1–2
Bulgaria	Dupnitsa	Dupnitsa	0–3
Lithuania	Vilnius	Vilnius	0–4

Semi finals August 8, 2006
A2	Austria	0
B1	Germany	4
B2	Moldova	1
A1	Russia	4

Finals; August 9, 2006
Germany	0
Russia	4
Third place
Moldova	4
Austria	1

=== Latin America ===
Country	City	LL Organization	Record
Venezuela	Barquisimeto	Cardenales	5–1
El Salvador	Soyapango	FESA	4–2
Guatemala	Guatemala City	Liga Pequeña de Béisbol	3–3
Nicaragua	Granada	Douglas Lacayo	3–3
Panama	Panama City	Las Acasias	3–3
Honduras	San Pedro Sula	Liga Marinera	3–3
Brazil	São Paulo	Minor League de Brazil	0–6

Games 22 & 23
1	Venezuela	18
5	Panama	1
3	Guatemala	7
4	Nicaragua	2

Game 24
2	El Salvador	2
3	Guatemala	7

Championship
1	Venezuela	8
3	Guatemala	2

=== Mexico ===
==== Phase 1 ====
Pool A
City	LL Organization	Record
(Baja California) Mexicali	Seguro Social	4–1
(Tamaulipas) Reynosa	Niños Heroes	4–1
(Veracruz) Boca del Río	Beto Ávila	3-2
(Nuevo León) Monterrey	Unidad Modelo	3–2
(Chihuahua (state)) Delicias	A Cura Trillo	1–4
(Jalisco) Tlaquepaque	Guadalajara Sutaj	0–5

Pool B
City	LL Organization	Record
(Tamaulipas) Matamoros	Matamoros	5–0
Nuevo León	Santa Catalina	3–2
(Sinaloa) Los Mochis	Teodoro Higuera	3–2
(Chihuahua (state)) Juárez	Satellite	2–3
(Mexico City) México, D.F.	Olmeca	2–3
(Coahuila) Saltillo	Saraperos	0–5

==== Phase 2 ====
City	LL Organization	Record
(Tamaulipas) Matamoros	Matamoros	5–0
(Sinaloa) Los Mochis	Teodoro Higuera	4–1
Nuevo León	Santa Catalina	3–2
(Baja California) Mexicali	Seguro Social	2–3
(Tamaulipas) Reynosa	Niños Heroes	1–4
(Veracruz) Boca del Río	Beto Ávila	0–5

==== Championship Game ====
Final
June 26
(Tamaulipas) Matamoros	10
(Nuevo León) Santa Catarina	0

=== Pacific ===
Country	City	LL Organization	Record
Northern Mariana Islands	Saipan	Saipan	4–0
Guam	Mangilao	Central East	3–1
New Zealand	Auckland	Bayside Westhaven	1–3
Indonesia	Jakarta	Jakarta	1–3
Philippines	Makati	Illam Central	1–3

=== Transatlantic ===
Country	City	LL Organization	Record
Saudi Arabia	Dhahran	Arabian-American	5–0
England	London	London Area Youth	4–1
United Arab Emirates	Dubai	Dubai	2–3
Belgium	Brussels	SHAPE/Waterloo	2–3
Germany	Rammstein	Ramstein American	1–4
Italy	Naples	Naples	1–4

Semi-finals
July 26
Saudi Arabia	8
Belgium	3
July 27
England	7
(United Arab Emirates) UAE	0

Final
July 27
Saudi Arabia	8
England	1
Third place
July 27
Belgium	6
(United Arab Emirates) UAE	9
