= Hilltown, Pennsylvania =

Unincorporated community in Pennsylvania, US

- Unincorporated community
- Location within Pennsylvania
- Coordinates: 40°19′37″N 75°14′9″W
- Country: United States
- State: Pennsylvania
- County: Bucks
- Township: Hilltown
- Elevation: 663 ft (202 m)
- Time zone: UTC-5 (Eastern (EST))
  - Summer (DST): UTC-4 (EDT)
- ZIP code: 18927
- Area codes: 215, 267 and 445
- GNIS feature ID: 1207867

Hilltown is an unincorporated community in Hilltown Township in Bucks County, Pennsylvania, United States. Hilltown is located at the intersection of Pennsylvania Route 152 and Broad Street.
