= Los Puertos de Altagracia =

- Location within Venezuela
- Coordinates: 10°40′27.99″N 71°30′49.63″W
- Time zone: UTC−4 (VET)

Los Puertos de Altagracia is the capital of the Miranda Municipality, located on the eastern coast of Lake Maracaibo in Zulia, Venezuela. It was founded in 1529.

== Villages ==
- San Joaquín de la Vega
