= Little League World Series (Northwest Region) =

Children's baseball tournament

Northwest Region
- Most recent season or competition: 2026 Little League World Series qualification
- Formerly: West Region (1957–2000)
- Sport: Baseball
- Founded: 2001; 25 years ago
- No. of teams: 4
- Country: United States
- Most recent champions: (Washington (state)) Soundview Little League, Tacoma, Washington
- Most titles: Washington (15) (Washington (state)) Eastlake Little League, Sammamish, Washington (2)

The Northwest Region is one of ten United States regions that currently send teams to the Little League World Series, the largest youth baseball competition in the world. The region's participation in the LLWS dates back to 1957, when it was known as the West Region. However, when the LLWS was expanded in 2001 from eight teams (four U.S. teams and four "International" teams from the rest of the world) to 16 teams (eight U.S. and eight International), the Western Region was split into the Northwest and West Regions.

The Northwest Region is made up of four states.

- Alaska
- Idaho
- Oregon
- Washington

Hawaii was a member of the region from 2002 to 2006. During that time, Wyoming was in the West Region. Colorado was a member in 2001, but has since been put into the Southwest Region.

Following the 2021 LLWS, Montana and Wyoming has been moved to a newly created Mountain Region. The latter region is one of the two new U.S. regions to be created as part of a planned expansion of the LLWS from 16 to 20 teams. This expansion was originally scheduled to occur for 2021, but was delayed to 2022 due to the COVID-19 pandemic.

== Regional Championship ==
The list below lists each state's participant in the Northwest Little League Region Tournament. That year's winner is indicated in green.

=== 2001 ===
Year	Alaska	Colorado	Idaho	Montana	Oregon	(Washington (state)) Washington	Wyoming
2001	Gastineau Channel East LL; Juneau	Academy LL; Colorado Springs	Coeur d'Alene LL; Coeur d'Alene	Billings Big Sky LL; Billings	West Salem LL; Salem	Bainbridge Island LL; Bainbridge Island	Laramie LL; Laramie

=== 2002–2005 ===
In 2002, some Little League regions were realigned. This resulted in Hawaii joining the Northwest Region, Wyoming moving to the West Region, and Colorado becoming part of the Southwest Region.

Year	Alaska	Hawaii	Idaho	Montana	Oregon	(Washington (state)) Washington
2002	Gastineau Channel East LL; Juneau	Waipio LL; Waipahu	Coeur d'Alene LL; Coeur d'Alene	Mount Sentinel LL; Missoula	Parrish LL; Salem	Mill Creek LL; Mill Creek
2003	Dimond-West LL; Anchorage	Pearl City LL; Pearl City	East Boise American LL; Boise	Boulder Arrowhead LL; Billings	Murrayhill LL; Beaverton	Richland National LL; Richland
2004	Dimond-West LL; Anchorage	Kihei LL; Kihei	West Valley LL; Eagle	Missoula Southside LL; Missoula	Murrayhill LL; Beaverton	Redmond North LL; Redmond
2005	Dimond-West LL; Anchorage	West Oahu LL ʻEwa Beach	Northwest Ada LL; Boise	Heights National LL; Billings	Murrayhill LL; Beaverton	Chehalis LL; Chehalis

=== 2006–2021 ===
In 2006, Wyoming returned to compete in the Northwest Region, while Hawaii was moved to the West Region.

Year	Alaska	Idaho	Montana	Oregon	(Washington (state)) Washington	Wyoming
2006	Dimond-West LL; Anchorage	North Boise LL; Boise	Missoula Southside LL; Missoula	Murrayhill LL; Beaverton	Kent LL; Kent	Laramie LL; Laramie
2007	Dimond-West LL; Anchorage	North Boise LL; Boise	Missoula Southside LL; Missoula	Lake Oswego LL; Lake Oswego	Kent LL; Kent	Laramie LL; Laramie
2008	Dimond-West LL; Anchorage	North Boise LL; Boise	Boulder-Arrowhead LL; Billings	Murrayhill LL; Beaverton	Mill Creek LL; Mill Creek	Laramie LL; Laramie
2009	Sitka LL; Sitka	Post Falls LL; Post Falls	Boulder Arrowhead LL; Billings	Parrish LL; Salem	Mercer Island LL; Mercer Island	Laramie LL; Laramie
2010	Gastineau Channel LL; Juneau	North Boise LL; Boise	Boulder Arrowhead LL; Billings	Murrayhill LL; Beaverton	Auburn LL; Auburn	Laramie LL; Laramie
2011	Abbott-o-Rabbit LL; Anchorage	Lewiston LL; Lewiston	Billings Big Sky LL; Billings	Bend South LL; Bend	North Bothell LL; Bothell	Laramie LL; Laramie
2012	Gastineau Channel LL; Juneau	Post Falls LL; Post Falls	Boulder Arrowhead LL; Billings	Gresham National LL; Gresham	Mercer Island LL; Mercer Island	Cody LL; Cody
2013	Abbott-o-Rabbit LL; Anchorage	Coeur d'Alene LL; Coeur d'Alene	Billings Big Sky LL; Billings	Lake Oswego LL; Lake Oswego	Eastlake LL; Sammamish	Cody LL; Cody
2014	Knik LL; Eagle River	Lewiston LL; Lewiston	Boulder Arrowhead LL; Billings	Bend North LL; Bend	Lynnwood Pacific LL; Lynnwood	Cody LL; Cody
2015	Gastineau Channel LL; Juneau	West Valley LL; Eagle	Boulder Arrowhead LL; Billings	Wilshire/Riverside LL; Portland	Cascade LL; Vancouver	Gillette LL; Gillette
2016	Abbott-o-Rabbit LL; Anchorage	North Boise LL; Boise	Mount Sentinel LL; Missoula	Bend North LL; Bend	Lynnwood Pacific LL; Lynnwood	Laramie LL; Laramie
2017	Ketchikan LL; Ketchikan	Lewiston LL; Lewiston	Mount Sentinel LL; Missoula	La Grande LL; La Grande	Walla Walla Valley LL; Walla Walla	Gillette LL; Gillette
2018	Gastineau Channel LL; Juneau	Coeur d'Alene LL; Coeur d'Alene	Boulder Arrowhead LL; Billings	Murrayhill LL; Beaverton	West Seattle LL; Seattle	Gillette LL; Gillette
2019	Sitka LL; Sitka	Coeur d'Alene LL; Coeur d'Alene	Heights National LL; Billings	Sprague LL; Salem	North Bothell LL; Bothell	Gillette LL; Gillette
2020	Not held due to the COVID-19 pandemic					
2021	Knik LL; Eagle River	West Valley LL; Eagle	Boulder Arrowhead LL; Billings	Lake Oswego LL; Lake Oswego	Eastlake LL; Sammamish	Cody LL; Cody

=== 2022–present ===
After the 2021 Little League World Series, Montana and Wyoming left to join the newly formed Mountain Region.

Year	Alaska	Idaho	Oregon	(Washington (state)) Washington
2022	Abbott-O-Rabbit LL; Anchorage	Lewiston LL; Lewiston	Bend North LL; Bend	Bonney Lake/Sumner LL; Bonney Lake
2023	Dimond-West LL; Anchorage	Coeur d'Alene LL; Coeur d'Alene	Murrayhill LL; Beaverton	Northeast Seattle LL; Seattle
2024	Abbott-O-Rabbit LL; Anchorage	West Valley LL; Eagle	Bend North LL; Bend	South Hill LL; Puyallup
2025	Abbott-O-Rabbit LL; Anchorage	Southwest Ada LL; Meridian	Murrayhill LL; Beaverton	Bonney Lake/Sumner LL; Bonney Lake
2026	Abbott-O-Rabbit LL; Anchorage	West Valley LL; Eagle	Bend North LL; Bend	Soundview LL; Tacoma

== LLWS results ==
As of the 2026 Little League World Series.

Year	Champion	City	LLWS	Record
2001	Bainbridge Island LL	(Washington (state)) Bainbridge Island	Group Stage	1–2
2002	Waipio LL	(Hawaii) Waipio	Group Stage	2–1
2003	National LL	(Washington (state)) Richland	Group Stage	0–3
2004	North LL	(Washington (state)) Redmond	Group Stage	1–2
2005	Oahu LL	(Hawaii) ʻEwa Beach	Champions	6–0
2006	Murrayhill LL	(Oregon) Beaverton	Third Place (tie)	3–2
2007	Lake Oswego LL	(Oregon) Lake Oswego	US Semifinal	2–2
2008	Mill Creek LL	(Washington (state)) Mill Creek	US Semifinal	2–2
2009	Mercer Island LL	(Washington (state)) Mercer Island	Group Stage	0–3
2010	Auburn LL	(Washington (state)) Auburn	Group Stage	3–2
2011	Big Sky LL	(Montana) Billings	Third Place (tie)	3–1
2012	Gresham National LL	(Oregon) Gresham	Round 1	0–3
2013	Eastlake LL	(Washington (state)) Sammamish	US Semifinal	3–2
2014	Lynnwood Pacific LL	(Washington (state)) Lynnwood	Round 2	1–2
2015	Wilshire/Riverside LL	(Oregon) Portland	Round 1	0–3
2016	Bend North LL	(Oregon) Bend	Round 1	1–2
2017	Walla Walla Valley LL	(Washington (state)) Walla Walla	Round 2	1–2
2018	Coeur d'Alene LL	(Idaho) Coeur d'Alene	Round 1	1–2
2019	Sprague LL	(Oregon) Salem	Round 1	1–2
2020	LLWS not held due to the COVID-19 pandemic			
2021 (Note: Due to the COVID-19 pandemic, Little League International did not invite teams from outside the U.S. to the LLWS in 2021. Instead, the top two teams in each U.S. region qualified.)	Eastlake LL	(Washington (state)) Sammamish	Round 2	1–2
2021	Lake Oswego LL	(Oregon) Lake Oswego	Round 2	1–2
2022	Bonney Lake/Sumner LL	(Washington (state)) Bonney Lake	Round 1	0–2
2023	Northeast Seattle LL	(Washington (state)) Seattle	US Semifinal	2–2
2024	South Hill LL	(Washington (state)) Puyallup	Round 2	0–2
2025	Bonney Lake/Sumner LL	(Washington (state)) Bonney Lake	Round 3	1–2
2026	Soundview LL	(Washington (state)) Tacoma	Round 3	2–2

=== Results by state ===
As of the 2026 Little League World Series. Italics indicates the state is no longer a member of the Northwest Region.

State	Northwest Championships	LLWS Championships	Record in LLWS	PCT
(Washington (state)) Washington	15	0	18–32	.360
Oregon	6	0	8–16	.333
Hawaii	2	1	8–1	.889
Montana	1	0	3–1	.750
Idaho	1	0	1–2	.333
Alaska	0	0	0–0	–
Wyoming	0	0	0–0	–
Colorado	0	0	0–0	–
Total	25	1	38–52	.422

== See also ==
- Little League World Series 1957–2000 (West Region)
- Little League World Series (West Region)

West Region in other Little League divisions

- Intermediate League
- Junior League
- Senior League
- Big League
