= 2026 Little League World Series qualification =

Children's baseball competition qualification

United States
- Great Lakes winner: Hamilton, Ohio
- Metro winner: Bayonne, New Jersey
- Mid-Atlantic winner: West Chester, Pennsylvania
- Midwest winner: Davenport, Iowa
- Mountain winner: Henderson, Nevada
- New England winner: Bridgewater, Massachusetts
- Northwest winner: (Washington (state)) Tacoma, Washington
- Southeast winner: Phenix City, Alabama
- Southwest winner: Boerne, Texas
- West winner: Bonita, California

International
- Asia-Pacific winner: Seoul, South Korea
- Australia winner: Sydney, New South Wales
- Canada winner: Vancouver, British Columbia
- Caribbean winner: Santiago, Dominican Republic
- Curaçao winner: (Curaçao) Willemstad
- Europe and Africa winner: (Czech Republic) Brno, Czechia
- Japan winner: Tokyo
- Latin America winner: León, Nicaragua
- Mexico winner: Tijuana, Baja California
- Panama winner: David, Chiriquí

Tournaments

Qualification for the 2026 Little League World Series took place in ten United States regions and ten international regions from March through August 2026.

== United States ==
=== Great Lakes ===
The tournament took place in Whitestown, Indiana from August 8–12.

State	City	LL Organization	Record
Illinois	Burbank	Burbank American	0–2
Indiana	Jasper	Jasper National	1–2
Kentucky	La Grange	North Oldham	2–2
Michigan	Bay City	Greater Bay	1–2
Ohio	Hamilton	West Side	4–0

Upper round 1
August 8 – Game 1
Ohio	10
Michigan	4
Lower round 1
August 9 – Game 4
Michigan	6
Illinois	3

Upper round 2
August 9 – Game 3 (F/4)
Indiana	0
Ohio	11
August 8 – Game 2 (F/5)
Illinois	2
Kentucky	12
Lower round 2
August 10 – Game 6
Indiana	11
Michigan	5

Upper final
August 10 – Game 5
Ohio	11
Kentucky	4
Lower final
August 11 – Game 7
Kentucky	8
Indiana	5

Final
August 12 – Championship
Ohio	6
Kentucky	0

=== Metro ===
The tournament took place in Bristol, Connecticut from August 8–14.

State	City	LL Organization	Record
Connecticut	Darien	Darien	2–2
New Jersey	Bayonne	Bayonne Central	3–0
New York	Port Washington	PYA	1–2
Rhode Island	Lincoln	Lincoln	0–2

Upper round 1
August 8 – Game 1
New York	10
Rhode Island	3
August 8 – Game 2
Connecticut	2
New Jersey	8
Lower round 1
August 9 – Game 3
Rhode Island	2
Connecticut	6

Upper final
August 10 – Game 4 (F/4)
New York	2
New Jersey	12
Lower final
August 12 – Game 5
Connecticut	8
New York	4

Final
August 14 – Championship
New Jersey	8
Connecticut	6

=== Mid-Atlantic ===
The tournament took place in Bristol, Connecticut from August 9–14.

State	City	LL Organization	Record
Delaware	Wilmington	Naamans	2–2
Maryland	Berlin	Berlin	0–2
Pennsylvania	West Chester	East Side	3–0
Washington, D.C.		Capitol Hill	1–2

Upper round 1
August 9 – Game 1
Maryland	6
Washington, D.C.	7
August 9 – Game 2
Pennsylvania	8
Delaware	1
Lower round 1
August 10 – Game 3
Maryland	4
Delaware	12

Upper final
August 11 – Game 4 (F/4)
Washington, D.C.	0
Pennsylvania	10
Lower final
August 13 – Game 5
Washington, D.C.	2
Delaware	7

Final
August 14 – Championship
Pennsylvania	3
Delaware	1

=== Midwest ===
The tournament took place in Whitestown, Indiana from August 7–14.

State	City	LL Organization	Record
Iowa	Davenport	Davenport Northwest	4–0
Kansas	Pittsburg	J.L. Hutchinson Baseball	0–2
Minnesota	Coon Rapids	Coon Rapids Andover American	2–2
Missouri	Columbia	Daniel Boone	2–2
Nebraska	Kearney	Kearney	0–2
North Dakota	Fargo	Fargo	1–2
South Dakota	Sioux Falls	Sioux Falls	1–2
Wisconsin	Whitefish Bay	Whitefish Bay	4–2

Upper round 1	Upper round 2	Upper final	Final
August 7 – Game 1
Nebraska	5
August 8 – Game 5
South Dakota	9
South Dakota	5
August 7 – Game 2 (F/4)
Iowa	6
North Dakota	0
August 12 – Game 12
Iowa	13
Iowa	11
August 7 – Game 3
Missouri	6
Minnesota	2
August 8 – Game 6
Missouri	4
Missouri	10
August 7 – Game 4 (F/5)
Wisconsin	4
Wisconsin	10	August 14 – Championship (F/7)
Kansas	0	Iowa	7
Wisconsin	6
Lower round 1	Lower round 2	Lower round 3	Lower final
August 10 – Game 9 (F/4)
August 9 – Game 7	Wisconsin	12	August 13 – Game 13
Nebraska	4	North Dakota	2	August 11 – Game 11	Missouri	4
North Dakota	8	Wisconsin	3	Wisconsin	9
August 10 – Game 10	Minnesota	2
August 9 – Game 8	South Dakota	4
Minnesota	6	Minnesota	9
Kansas	4

=== Mountain ===
The tournament took place in San Bernardino, California from August 8–14.

State	City	LL Organization	Record
Colorado	Lafayette	Coal Creek	1–2
Montana	Billings	Billings Big Sky	2–2
Nevada	Henderson	Paseo Verde	3–0
Utah	Alpine	Lone Peak	2–2
Wyoming	Laramie	Laramie	0–2

Upper round 1
August 8 – Game 1
Utah	5
Colorado	4
Lower round 1
August 9 – Game 4
Colorado	11
Wyoming	5

Upper round 2
August 9 – Game 3
Montana	3
Utah	11
August 8 – Game 2 (F/4)
Wyoming	0
Nevada	12
Lower round 2
August 10 – Game 5
Montana	9
Colorado	5

Upper final
August 11 – Game 6 (F/7)
Utah	3
Nevada	4
Lower final
August 13 – Game 7
Utah	4
Montana	12

Final
August 14 – Championship
Nevada	9
Montana	2

=== New England ===
The tournament took place in Bristol, Connecticut from August 8–13.

State	City	LL Organization	Record
Maine	Gray	Gray New Gloucester	2–2
Massachusetts	Bridgewater	Bridgewater Joe Lazaro	3–0
New Hampshire	Portsmouth	Portsmouth	0–2
Vermont	Richmond	Camels Hump	1–2

Upper round 1
August 8 – Game 1
Vermont	1
New Hampshire	0
August 8 – Game 2
Maine	0
Massachusetts	7
Lower round 1
August 9 – Game 3
New Hampshire	6
Maine	10

Upper final
August 10 – Game 4 (F/5)
Vermont	1
Massachusetts	11
Lower final
August 12 – Game 5 (F/5)
Vermont	0
Maine	10

Final
August 13 – Championship
Massachusetts	8
Maine	0

=== Northwest ===
The tournament took place in San Bernardino, California from August 8–13.

State	City	LL Organization	Record
Alaska	Anchorage	Abbott-O-Rabbit	0–2
Idaho	Eagle	West Valley	2–1
Oregon	Bend	Bend North	1–2
Washington	Tacoma	Soundview	3–1

Upper round 1
August 8 – Game 1 (F/5)
Alaska	2
Idaho	12
August 8 – Game 2
Oregon	3
Washington	5
Lower round 1
August 10 – Game 3
Alaska	3
Oregon	11

Upper final
August 11 – Game 4
Idaho	9
Washington	3
Lower final
August 12 – Game 5
Washington	8
Oregon	2

Final
August 13 – Championship
Idaho	5
Washington	8

=== Southeast ===
The tournament took place in Warner Robins, Georgia from August 6–11.

State	City	LL Organization	Record
Alabama	Phenix City	Phenix City Youth Baseball	4–0
Florida	Tallahassee	Chaires–Capitola	2–2
Georgia	Columbus	Columbus American	1–2
North Carolina	Huntersville	Lake Norman	0–2
South Carolina	Irmo	Irmo	2–2
Tennessee	Nolensville	Nolensville	4–2
Virginia	Centreville	SYA	1–2
West Virginia	Shady Spring	Shady Spring	0–2

Upper round 1	Upper round 2	Upper final	Final
August 6 – Game 1
South Carolina	4
August 7 – Game 7
West Virginia	1
South Carolina	1
August 6 – Game 2 (F/4)
Florida	8
Florida	16
August 9 – Game 11
Georgia	1
Florida	5
August 7 – Game 3
Alabama	8
Virginia	2
August 8 – Game 8
Tennessee	10
Tennessee	2
August 7 – Game 4
Alabama	5
North Carolina	5	August 11 – Championship
Alabama	8	Alabama	4
Tennessee	0
Lower round 1	Lower round 2	Lower round 3	Lower final
August 8 – Game 9
August 7 – Game 5	Tennessee	13	August 10 – Game 13
West Virginia	4	Georgia	1	August 9 – Game 12	Florida	0
Georgia	5	Tennessee	6	Tennessee	4
August 8 – Game 10	South Carolina	1
August 7 – Game 6 (F/7)	South Carolina	5
Virginia	1	Virginia	0
North Carolina	0

=== Southwest ===
The tournament took place in Waco, Texas from August 6–10.

State	City	LL Organization	Record
Arkansas	Little Rock	Junior Deputy Baseball	1–2
Louisiana	Gonzales	Ascension Parish	3–1
Mississippi	Clinton	Clinton Baseball Association	1–2
New Mexico	Albuquerque	Eastdale	0–2
Oklahoma	Tulsa	Tulsa National	1–1*
Texas East	Richmond	Lamar	2–2
Texas West	Boerne	Boerne	3–1

Upper round 1	Upper round 2	Upper final	Final
August 7 – Game 4
Oklahoma	3
August 6 – Game 1
Texas East	1
Texas East	10
August 9 – Game 9
Texas West	3
Oklahoma	0*
August 6 – Game 2
Louisiana	6
Arkansas	2
August 7 – Game 5
Louisiana	8
Louisiana	2
August 6 – Game 3
Mississippi	0
New Mexico	0
August 10 – Championship
Mississippi	4
Louisiana	1
Texas West	4
Lower round 1	Lower round 2	Lower round 3	Lower final
August 8 – Game 8 (F/5)
August 7 – Game 6	Texas East	12	August 10 – Not Played*
Arkansas	9	Arkansas	2	August 9 – Game 10	Oklahoma	–
New Mexico	4	Texas East	2	Texas West	–
August 8 – Game 7 (F/5)	Texas West	3
Texas West	10
Mississippi	0

*On August 10, 2026, Oklahoma's Tulsa National Little League was disqualified from the Southwest Region Tournament and forced to forfeit its 3–2 win over Louisiana due to fielding an ineligible player. The forfeit was officially recorded as a 6–0 win for Louisiana. Game 11 between Louisiana and Texas West served as the Championship game of the Southwest Region Tournament. One day after the championship game, the Oklahoma team was granted a temporary restraining order by a judge in Waco, allowing them to play Texas West for the bid. Later on August 11, 2026, the temporary restraining order was dismissed, and Little League International confirmed that Boerne Little League is the Southwest region champions.

=== West ===
The tournament took place in San Bernardino, California from August 9–14.

State	City	LL Organization	Record
Arizona	Chandler	Chandler National	1–2
Hawaii	Kapaʻa	Kawaihau Community	2–2
Northern California	Danville	San Ramon Valley	0–2
Southern California	Bonita	Sweetwater Valley	3–0

Upper round 1
August 9 – Game 1
Northern California	4
Southern California	16
August 9 – Game 2
Arizona	3
Hawaii	7
Lower round 1
August 10 – Game 3
Northern California	5
Arizona	7

Upper final
August 11 – Game 4
Southern California	6
Hawaii	0
Lower final
August 12 – Game 5
Hawaii	5
Arizona	2

Final
August 14 – Championship
Southern California	11
Hawaii	3

== International ==
=== Asia-Pacific ===
The tournament took place in Hwaseong, South Korea from June 27 – July 3.

Pool A
Country	City	LL Organization	Record
Chinese Taipei^{1}	Yanping Township	Hung-Yeh	5–0
Philippines	Tanauan	Tanauan	4–1
China	Shenzhen	Shenzhen Bay Area	3–2
Hong Kong		Hong Kong	2–3
Guam	Hagåtña	Guam District 1	1–4
Thailand	Bangkok	Sanuk	0–5

Pool B
Country	City	LL Organization	Record
South Korea	Seoul	West Seoul (B)	4–0
New Zealand	Auckland	Auckland Baseball Association	3–1
Saudi Arabia	Dhahran	Dhahran	2–2
Northern Mariana Islands	Saipan	Saipan	1–3
Indonesia	Bogor	Indonesian	0–4

^{1} Republic of China, commonly known as Taiwan, due to complicated relations with People's Republic of China, is recognized by the name Chinese Taipei by majority of international organizations including Little League Baseball (LLB). For more information, please see Cross-Strait relations.

==== Knockout round ====
Semi-finals
July 2 – Hwaseong
1B South Korea	10
2A Philippines	0
July 2 – Hwaseong
1A Chinese Taipei	13
2B New Zealand	2

Asia-Pacific Championship
July 3 – Hwaseong
1B South Korea	3
1A Chinese Taipei	1

=== Australia ===
The tournament took place in Rooty Hill, New South Wales from June 3–8.

==== Pool A ====
Pos	Team	Pld	W	L	RF	RA	RD	PCT	Qualification
1	(New South Wales) Ryde Red	5	4	1	34	22	+12	.800	Advance to semi-finals
2	(Western Australia) Central Firebirds	5	4	1	38	22	+16	.800	Advance to semi-finals
3	(New South Wales) Cronulla Black	5	3	2	27	24	+3	.600	
4	(Victoria (state)) Melbourne Rangers	5	2	3	17	28	−11	.400	
5	(Queensland) Brisbane North	5	1	4	28	35	−7	.200	
6	(Australian Capital Territory) Canberra Rangers	5	1	4	21	34	−13	.200	

Source: 2026 Australia Region Tournament

==== Pool B ====
Pos	Team	Pld	W	L	RF	RA	RD	PCT	Qualification
1	(Western Australia) Eastern Phantoms	5	4	1	49	28	+21	.800	Advance to semi-finals
2	(South Australia) Adelaide Marlins	5	4	1	41	25	+16	.800	Advance to semi-finals
3	(Queensland) Brisbane Metro	5	3	2	34	18	+16	.600	
4	(New South Wales) Ryde Black	5	3	2	40	16	+24	.600	
5	(Victoria (state)) Melbourne Athletics	5	1	4	26	45	−19	.200	
6	(Northern Territory) NT Buffaloes	5	0	5	23	81	−58	.000	

Source: 2026 Australia Region Tournament

==== Bracket ====
Semi-finals
June 7 – Rooty Hill
2A (Western Australia) Central Firebirds	9
1B (Western Australia) Eastern Phantoms	2
June 7 – Rooty Hill
2B (South Australia) Adelaide Marlins	0
1A (New South Wales) Ryde Red	4

Australia Championship
June 8 – Rooty Hill
2A (Western Australia) Central Firebirds	3
1A (New South Wales) Ryde Red	9
Third place
June 8 – Rooty Hill
1B (Western Australia) Eastern Phantoms	1
2B (South Australia) Adelaide Marlins	5

=== Canada ===
The tournament took place in Glace Bay, Nova Scotia from August 3–12.

Province	City	LL Organization	Record
British Columbia	Vancouver	Little Mountain	6–0
Alberta	Calgary	Calgary West	4–2
Ontario	Ottawa	Ottawa West	4–2
Quebec	Trois-Rivières	Trois-Rivières	3–3
Nova Scotia (Host)	Glace Bay	Glace Bay	2–4
Nova Scotia	Sydney Mines	Sydney Mines and District	2–4
Saskatchewan	Regina	North Regina	0–6

==== Bracket ====
Semi-finals
August 11 – Glace Bay
1 British Columbia	8
4 Quebec	0
August 11 – Glace Bay
2 Alberta	1
3 Ontario	3

Canada Championship
August 12 – Glace Bay (F/8)
1 British Columbia	4
3 Ontario	0

=== Caribbean ===
The tournament took place in Sabana Grande, Puerto Rico from July 10–17.

Country	City	LL Organization	Record
Dominican Republic	Santiago	Los Nacionales	5–1
Aruba	Oranjestad	Aruba North	5–1
Bonaire	Kralendijk	Bonaire	4–2
Bahamas	Nassau	Freedom Farm	4–2
Puerto Rico (Host)	Sabana Grande	Gino Vega	2–4
US Virgin Islands	St. Thomas	Elrod Hendricks West	1–5
Puerto Rico	Yabucoa	Juan Antonio Bibiloni	0–6

Semi-finals
July 16 – Sabana Grande
1 Dominican Republic	2
4 Bahamas	0
July 16 – Sabana Grande
2 Aruba	6
3 Bonaire	3

Caribbean Championship
July 17 – Sabana Grande
1 Dominican Republic	5
2 Aruba	3
Third place
July 17 – Sabana Grande
4 Bahamas	11
3 Bonaire	5

=== Curaçao ===
As part of a rotational schedule, the winner of the Curaçao Region gained direct entry into the LLWS tournament in 2026. The regional tournament took place in Willemstad from March 12–April 11.

==== First Round ====
Upper round 1
Pabao	12
Willemstad	0

Upper final
Pariba	3
Pabao	4
Lower final
Pariba	10
Willemstad	1

Final
Pabao	4
Pariba	2

==== Championship Series ====
The best-of-seven championship series was played between April 7–11.

Curaçao Championship
Pariba	0	3	5	2	6	5	–
Pabao	10	2	1	4	2	2	–

=== Europe and Africa ===
The tournament took place in Kutno, Poland from July 19–25.

==== Qualifier tournament ====
Country	City	LL Organization	Record
Lithuania	Kaunas	Central Lithuania	4–1
Switzerland	Therwil	Switzerland West	3–2
Austria	Vienna	East Austria	3–2
Poland	Wrocław	Klub Sportowy Baseball Wrocław	3–2
Slovakia	Bratislava	Slovakia West	2–3
Ukraine	Kyiv	Kyiv	0–5

==== Regional tournament ====
Pool A
Country	City	LL Organization	Record
Czechia	Brno	South Czech Republic	4–0
Germany	Mannheim	South-West Germany	3–1
Ukraine	Kyiv	Kyiv Baseball School	2–2
Lithuania	Kaunas	Central Lithuania	1–3
Croatia	Sisak	Croatia North	0–4

Pool B
Country	City	LL Organization	Record
Spain	Barcelona	Catalunya	5–0
Belgium	Antwerp	Belgium Region 3	4–1
Italy	Verona	Veneto	3–2
United Kingdom	London	London	2–3
Switzerland	Therwil	Switzerland West	1–4
Netherlands	Rotterdam	Rotterdam	0–5

Semi-finals
July 24 – Kutno
1A Czechia	1
2B Belgium	0
July 24 – Kutno
1B Spain	5
2A Germany	3

Europe-Africa Championship
July 25 – Kutno
1A Czechia	4
1B Spain	2

=== Japan ===
The tournament took place in Narita, Chiba from July 17–19.

Pool A
Team	Prefecture	City	LL Organization	Record
Higashikanto; Champions	Chiba	Chiba	Chiba	2–0
Kansai; Champions	Hyogo	Takarazuka	Hyogo	1–1
Tōhoku; Champions	Yamagata	Yamagata	Yamagata	0–2

Pool C
Team	Prefecture	City	LL Organization	Record
Tōkai; Champions	Shizuoka	Hamamatsu	Shizuoka	2–0
Shikoku; Champions	Ehime	Iyo	Ehime Chuo	1–1
Chūgoku; Champions	Hiroshima	Hiroshima	Sanyo	0–2

Pool B
Team	Prefecture	City	LL Organization	Record
Tokyo; Champions	Tokyo	Tokyo	Joto	2–0
Higashikanto; Runner-Up	Ibaraki	Ibaraki	Ibaraki	1–1
Kanagawa; Champions	Kanagawa	Yokohama	Yokohama	0–2

Pool D
Team	Prefecture	City	LL Organization	Record
Kitakanto; Champions	Saitama	Koshigaya	Saitama Musashi	2–0
Shin'etsu; Champions	Niigata	Niigata	Niigata	1–1
Kyushu; Champions	Fukuoka	Kitakyushu	Kyushu Hokubu	0–2

Semi-finals
July 19 – Narita
1A (Chiba Prefecture) Chiba	7
1D (Saitama Prefecture) Saitama Musashi	5
July 19 – Narita
1B Tokyo	5
1C (Shizuoka Prefecture) Shizuoka	1

Japan Championship
July 19 – Narita
1A (Chiba Prefecture) Chiba	5
1B Tokyo	22

=== Latin America ===
The tournament took place in Ciudad de Guatemala, Guatemala from July 11–17.

Pool A
Country	City	LL Organization	Record
Nicaragua	León	Ministerio Sobre Las Alas Del Aguila	5–0
Venezuela	Lara	Jiménez	4–1
Colombia	Cartagena	Falcon	2–3
Honduras	San Pedro Sula	Marinera	2–3
Costa Rica	Santo Domingo de Heredia	Santo Domingo de Heredia	2–3
Guatemala B	Guatemala City	Departamental of Guatemala	0–5

Pool B
Country	City	LL Organization	Record
Chile	Santiago	Santiago Oriente	3–1
Guatemala A	Guatemala City	Javier de Baseball	3–1
El Salvador	Soyapango	FESA	2–2
Brazil	São Paulo	Cantareira	2–2
Argentina	Buenos Aires	Buenos Aires	0–4

Semi-finals
July 16 – Guatemala City
2A Venezuela	3
1B Chile	4
July 16 – Guatemala City
2B Guatemala A	4
1A Nicaragua	20

Latin America Championship
July 17 – Guatemala City
1B Chile	1
1A Nicaragua	3
Third place
July 17 – Guatemala City
2A Venezuela	10
2B Guatemala A	2

=== Mexico ===
The tournament took place in Matamoros, Tamaulipas from July 5–11.

Pool A
State	City	LL Organization	Record
Tamaulipas	Matamoros	Matamoros	6–0
Baja California	Tijuana	Municipal de Tijuana	5–1
Nuevo León	San Nicolás	Gallos de San Nicolás	3–3
Chihuahua	Parral	Deporte Asociado San Uriel AC	3–3
Veracruz	Cardel	Intermunicipal De Beisbol Infantil De Cardel	2–4
Durango	Gómez Palacio	Municipal De Beisbol Gómez Palacios Durango	2–4
Nayarit	Tepic	Kora	0–6

Pool B
State	City	LL Organization	Record
Baja California	Mexicali	Seguro Social	6–0
Nuevo León	San Nicolás	Cuauhtémoc	5–1
Tamaulipas	Matamoros	Villa del Refugio	3–3
Chihuahua	Chihuahua	El Swing Perfecto	3–3
Aguascalientes	Aguascalientes	Casio Aguascalientes	2–4
Coahuila	Sabinas	Juvenil De Sabinas	2–4
Veracruz	Medellín de Bravo	Regional De Medellín	0–6

Semi-finals
July 10 – Matamoros
1A (Tamaulipas) Matamoros	1
2B (Nuevo León) Cuauhtémoc	0
July 10 – Matamoros
1B (Baja California) Seguro Social	1
2A (Baja California) Municipal de Tijuana	3

Mexico Championship
July 11 – Matamoros
1A (Tamaulipas) Matamoros	2
2A (Baja California) Municipal de Tijuana	8

=== Panama ===
As part of a rotational schedule, the winner of the Panama Region gained direct entry into the LLWS tournament in 2026. The regional tournament took place in Panama City from March 7–20.

==== First Round ====
Pool A
Province	City	LL Organization	Record
Panamá Oeste	La Chorrera	Barrio Colon	4–1
Herrera	Chitré	Chitré	4–1
Los Santos	Las Tablas	Santeños Unidos	3–2
Panamá Metro	San Miguelito	Cerro Viento	3–2
Veraguas	Santiago de Veraguas	Activo 20-30	1–4
Darién	Metetí	Meteti	0–5

Pool B
Province	City	LL Organization	Record
Chiriquí	David	David Doleguita	5–0
Coclé	Aguadulce	Aguadulce	4–1
Panamá Este	Pacora	Pacora	3–2
Colón	Cristóbal	Cristóbal	2–3
Chiriquí Occídente	Puerto Armuelles	Baru	1–4
Bocas del Toro	Almirante	Almirante	0–5

==== Final 6 ====
Province	City	LL Organization	Record
Panamá Oeste	La Chorrera	Barrio Colon	4–1
Chiriquí	David	David Doleguita	3–2
Herrera	Chitré	Chitré	3–2
Coclé	Aguadulce	Aguadulce	3–2
Los Santos	Las Tablas	Santeños Unidos	2–3
Panamá Este	Pacora	Pacora	0–5

Tiebreaker 1
Herrera	5
Coclé	1

Tiebreaker 2
Herrera	3
Chiriquí	7

==== Championship Series ====
The best-of-three championship series was played between March 19–20.

Panama Championship
Chiriquí	2	8	8
Panamá Oeste	3	7	4
