= 2023 Little League World Series qualification =

United States
- Great Lakes winner: New Albany, Ohio
- Metro winner: Smithfield, Rhode Island
- Mid-Atlantic winner: Media, Pennsylvania
- Midwest winner: Fargo, North Dakota
- Mountain winner: Henderson, Nevada
- New England winner: Gray, Maine
- Northwest winner: (Washington (state)) Seattle, Washington
- Southeast winner: Nolensville, Tennessee
- Southwest winner: Needville, Texas
- West winner: El Segundo, California

International
- Asia-Pacific and Middle East winner: Taoyuan, Chinese Taipei
- Australia winner: (Australia) Sydney, New South Wales
- Canada winner: (Canada) Regina, Saskatchewan
- Caribbean winner: Willemstad, Curaçao
- Cuba winner: (Cuba) Bayamo, Granma
- Europe and Africa winner: Brno, Czech Republic
- Japan winner: (Japan) Tokyo
- Latin America winner: Maracaibo, Venezuela
- Mexico winner: (Mexico) Tijuana, Baja California
- Panama winner: (Panama) Santiago de Veraguas

Tournaments

Qualification for the 2023 Little League World Series took place in ten United States regions and ten international regions from February through August 2023.

== United States ==
=== Great Lakes ===
The tournament took place in Whitestown, Indiana from August 5–10.

State	City	LL Organization	Record
Illinois	Elmhurst	Elmhurst Youth Baseball	2–1
Indiana	Bedford	Bedford	1–2
Kentucky	Lexington	Lexington Eastern	1–2
Michigan	Midland	Midland Northeast	0–2
Ohio	New Albany	New Albany	4–1

Upper round 1
August 5 – Game 1 (F/4)
Michigan	2
Ohio	12
Lower round 1
August 6 – Game 4
Michigan	1
Indiana	2

Upper round 2
August 6 – Game 3
Kentucky	0
Ohio	6
August 5 – Game 2 (F/4)
Illinois	13
Indiana	1
Lower round 2
August 7 – Game 5
Kentucky	7
Indiana	6

Upper final
August 7 – Game 6
Ohio	4
Illinois	8
Lower final
August 8 – Game 7
Ohio	8
Kentucky	5

Final
August 10 – Championship
Illinois	0
Ohio	4

=== Metro ===
The tournament took place in Bristol, Connecticut from August 5–11.

State	City	LL Organization	Record
Connecticut	East Lyme	East Lyme	0–2
New Jersey	East Hanover	East Hanover	1–2
New York	Massapequa	Massapequa Coast	2–1
Rhode Island	Smithfield	Smithfield	3–1

August 5 – Game 1
New Jersey	3
August 7 – Game 4
Connecticut	0
New Jersey	1
August 5 – Game 2
New York	10
New York	10
August 11 – Championship
Rhode Island	1
New York	1
Rhode Island	7
August 9 – Game 5
New Jersey	5
August 6 – Game 3
Rhode Island	10
Connecticut	0
Rhode Island	2

=== Mid-Atlantic ===
The tournament took place in Bristol, Connecticut from August 6–11.

State	City	LL Organization	Record
Delaware	Middletown	M O T	1–2
Maryland	Germantown	Montgomery County	0–2
Pennsylvania	Media	Media	3–0
Washington, D.C.		Northwest Washington	2–2

August 6 – Game 1
Pennsylvania	6
August 8 – Game 4
Maryland	2
Pennsylvania	16
August 6 – Game 2
Washington, D.C.	3
Washington, D.C.	4
August 11 – Championship (F/7)
Delaware	0
Pennsylvania	2
Washington, D.C.	0
August 10 – Game 5
Washington, D.C.	1
August 8 – Game 3
Delaware	0
Maryland	6
Delaware	12

=== Midwest ===
The tournament took place in Whitestown, Indiana from August 4–11.

State	City	LL Organization	Record
Iowa	Johnston	Johnston	3–2
Kansas	Pittsburg	J L Hutchinson Baseball	1–2
Minnesota	Coon Rapids	Coon Rapids Andover American	0–2
Missouri	Webb City	Webb City	0–2
Nebraska	Kearney	Kearney	2–2
North Dakota	Fargo	Fargo	4–1
South Dakota	Sioux Falls	Sioux Falls	3–1
Wisconsin	Shorewood	Shorewood	1–2

Upper round 1	Upper round 2	Upper final	Final
August 4 – Game 1
Kansas	1
August 5 – Game 5
North Dakota	15
North Dakota	16
August 4 – Game 2
Wisconsin	2
Wisconsin	5
August 9 – Game 12
Missouri	2
North Dakota	3
August 4 – Game 3
South Dakota	7
Minnesota	1
August 5 – Game 6
Nebraska	4
Nebraska	3
August 4 – Game 4
South Dakota	7
Iowa	1	August 11 – Championship
South Dakota	2	South Dakota	7
North Dakota	9
Lower round 1	Lower round 2	Lower round 3	Lower final
August 7 – Game 9
August 6 – Game 7	Nebraska	9	August 10 – Game 13
Kansas	8	Kansas	3	August 8 – Game 11	North Dakota	12
Missouri	5	Nebraska	3	Iowa	7
August 7 – Game 10	Iowa	9
August 6 – Game 8	Wisconsin	0
Minnesota	5	Iowa	2
Iowa	11

=== Mountain ===
The tournament took place in San Bernardino, California from August 6–11.

State	City	LL Organization	Record
Montana	Billings	Boulder Arrowhead	1–2
Nevada	Henderson	Henderson	3–0
Utah	Santa Clara	Snow Canyon	2–2
Wyoming	Torrington	Torrington	0–2

August 6 – Game 1
Nevada	6
August 8 – Game 4
Montana	1
Nevada	6
August 6 – Game 2 (F/5)
Utah	3
Wyoming	2
August 11 – Championship (F/4)
Utah	12
Nevada	10
Utah	0
August 10 – Game 5
Utah	2
August 7 – Game 3
Montana	1
Montana	8
Wyoming	4

=== New England ===
The tournament took place in Bristol, Connecticut from August 5–10.

State	City	LL Organization	Record
Maine	Gray	Gray New Gloucester	3–0
Massachusetts	Canton	Canton	2–2
New Hampshire	Salem	Salem	1–2
Vermont	St. Johnsbury	St. Johnsbury	0–2

August 5 – Game 1
Vermont	0
August 7 – Game 4
Massachusetts	12
Massachusetts	1
August 5 – Game 2 (F/7)
Maine	7
New Hampshire	0
August 10 – Championship
Maine	3
Maine	2
Massachusetts	1
August 9 – Game 5
Massachusetts	5
August 6 – Game 3 (F/4)
New Hampshire	0
Vermont	1
New Hampshire	12

=== Northwest ===
The tournament took place in San Bernardino, California from August 5–10.

State	City	LL Organization	Record
Alaska	Anchorage	Dimond-West	2–2
Idaho	Coeur d'Alene	Coeur d'Alene	1–2
Oregon	Beaverton	Murrayhill	0–2
Washington	Seattle	Northeast Seattle	3–0

August 5 – Game 1
Idaho	2
August 7 – Game 4
Alaska	10
Alaska	0
August 5 – Game 2 (F/4)
Washington	9
Oregon	0
August 10 – Championship (F/5)
Washington	12
Washington	12
Alaska	1
August 9 – Game 5
Alaska	2
August 6 – Game 3
Idaho	0
Idaho	3
Oregon	1

=== Southeast ===
The tournament took place in Warner Robins, Georgia from August 3–8.

State	City	LL Organization	Record
Alabama	Rainbow City	Coosa	0–2
Florida	Lake Mary	Lake Mary	3–1
Georgia	Hamilton	Harris County	2–2
North Carolina	Durham	South Durham	0–2
South Carolina	Taylors	Northwood	1–2
Tennessee	Nolensville	Nolensville	5–1
Virginia	Vienna	Vienna	2–2
West Virginia	Bridgeport	Bridgeport	1–2

Upper round 1	Upper round 2	Upper final	Final
August 3 – Game 1
North Carolina	4
August 5 – Game 7 (F/5)
Florida	5
Florida	11
August 3 – Game 2
Virginia	1
Virginia	11
August 6 – Game 12
South Carolina	8
Florida	7
August 3 – Game 3 (F/4)
Georgia	0
Tennessee	10
August 5 – Game 8
Alabama	0
Tennessee	2
August 4 – Game 4 (F/4)
Georgia	6
West Virginia	0	August 8 – Championship
Georgia	13	Florida	1
Tennessee	4
Lower round 1	Lower round 2	Lower round 3	Lower final
August 5 – Game 10
August 4 – Game 5	Tennessee	8	August 7 – Game 13
North Carolina	3	South Carolina	1	August 6 – Game 11	Georgia	0
South Carolina	4	Virginia	2	Tennessee	4
August 5 – Game 9	Tennessee	7
August 4 – Game 6	Virginia	5
Alabama	5	West Virginia	4
West Virginia	8

=== Southwest ===
The tournament took place in Waco, Texas from August 3–8.

State	City	LL Organization	Record
Arkansas	Little Rock	Junior Deputy Baseball	0–2
Colorado	Glenwood Springs	Three Rivers	0–2
Louisiana	Gonzales	Ascension Parish	3–2
Mississippi	Starkville	Starkville	1–2
New Mexico	Albuquerque	Roadrunner White	2–2
Oklahoma	Tulsa	Tulsa National	3–2
Texas East	Needville	Needville	4–0
Texas West	Midland	Midland Northern	1–2

Upper round 1	Upper round 2	Upper final	Final
August 3 – Game 1
Mississippi	5
August 4 – Game 7
Texas East	9
Texas East	5
August 3 – Game 2
Texas West	2
Texas West	10
August 6 – Game 12
Colorado	1
Texas East	3
August 3 – Game 3 (F/5)
Louisiana	0
Louisiana	11
August 4 – Game 8
New Mexico	1
Louisiana	5
August 3 – Game 4 (F/4)
Oklahoma	1
Arkansas	0	August 8 – Championship
Oklahoma	10	Texas East	5
Louisiana	3
Lower round 1	Lower round 2	Lower round 3	Lower final
August 5 – Game 9
August 4 – Game 5 (F/5)	Oklahoma	5	August 7 – Game 13
Mississippi	11	Mississippi	4	August 6 – Game 11	Louisiana	8
Colorado	1	Oklahoma	9	Oklahoma	7
August 5 – Game 10	New Mexico	1
August 4 – Game 6	Texas West	1
New Mexico	9	New Mexico	8
Arkansas	3

=== West ===
The tournament took place in San Bernardino, California from August 5–11.

State	City	LL Organization	Record
Arizona	Tucson	Canyon View	0–2
Hawaii	Hilo	Hilo	1–2
Northern California	San Ramon	Bollinger Canyon	2–2
Southern California	El Segundo	El Segundo	3–0

August 5 – Game 1
Arizona	4
August 7 – Game 4
Hawaii	7
Hawaii	0
August 5 – Game 2
Southern California	6
Northern California	3
August 11 – Championship
Southern California	4
Southern California	3
Northern California	1
August 9 – Game 5
Hawaii	0
August 6 – Game 3
Northern California	3
Arizona	1
Northern California	5

== International ==
=== Asia-Pacific ===
The tournament took place in Seoul, Korea Republic from June 20–26.

Pool A
Country	Record
Chinese Taipei^{1}	3–0
Philippines	2–1
China	1–2
Guam	0–3

Pool B
Country	Record
Korea Republic	3–0
Indonesia	2–1
Qatar	1–2
New Zealand	0–3

^{1} Republic of China, commonly known as Taiwan, due to complicated relations with People's Republic of China, is recognized by the name Chinese Taipei by majority of international organizations including Little League Baseball (LLB). For more information, please see Cross-Strait relations.

==== Knockout round ====
Semi-finals
June 25 – Hwaseong (F/4)
1B Chinese Taipei	16
2A Indonesia	0
June 25 – Hwaseong
1A Korea Republic	0*
2B Philippines	6

Asia-Pacific Championship
June 28 – Hwaseong
1A Chinese Taipei	-
1B Philippines	-

- On June 30, South Seoul A Little League was forced to forfeit its games at the Asia-Pacific regional tournament due to rules violations for fielding ineligible players who had previously appeared for a different team in the Korean national tournament - they are officially recorded as 6-0 victories for the opposing team. Kuei-Shan Little League was awarded the Asia-Pacific championship and advanced to Williamsport. South Seoul A had originally won the championship game, 2-1.

=== Australia ===
The tournament took place in Gold Coast, Queensland from June 7–12.

==== Pool A ====
Pos	Team	Pld	W	L	RF	RA	RD	PCT	Qualification
1	(New South Wales) Cronulla	5	4	1	52	8	+44	.800	Advance to semi-finals
2	(Western Australia) Perth Metro Central	5	4	1	40	19	+21	.800	Advance to semi-finals
3	(New South Wales) Ryde Red	5	4	1	40	21	+19	.800	
4	(South Australia) Adelaide Rays	5	2	3	23	30	−7	.400	
5	(Queensland) Gold Coast	5	1	4	31	54	−23	.200	
6	(Victoria (state)) Northwestern Twins	5	0	5	17	71	−54	.000	

Source: 2023 Australian Region Tournament

==== Pool B ====
Pos	Team	Pld	W	L	RF	RA	RD	PCT	Qualification
1	(New South Wales) Hills	5	5	0	41	8	+33	1.000	Advance to semi-finals
2	(Queensland) Brisbane North	5	4	1	48	21	+27	.800	Advance to semi-finals
3	(Western Australia) Perth Metro East	5	2	3	27	25	+2	.400	
4	(Victoria (state)) Eastern Athletics	5	2	3	26	32	−6	.400	
5	(South Australia) Adelaide Marlins	5	1	4	28	41	−13	.200	
6	(Australian Capital Territory) Canberra	5	1	4	27	70	−43	.200	

Source: 2023 Australian Region Tournament

==== Bracket ====
Semi-finals
June 11 – Gold Coast
1A (New South Wales) Cronulla	3
2B (Queensland) Brisbane North	7
June 11 – Gold Coast (F/4)
1B (New South Wales) Hills	10
2A (Western Australia) Perth Metro Central	0

Australia Championship
June 12 – Gold Coast
2B (Queensland) Brisbane North	2
1B (New South Wales) Hills	3
Third place
June 12 – Gold Coast
1A (New South Wales) Cronulla	1
2A (Western Australia) Perth Metro Central	2

Consolation
June 11 – Gold Coast
3B (Western Australia) Perth Metro East	6
4A (South Australia) Adelaide Rays	2
June 11 – Gold Coast
3A (New South Wales) Ryde Red	6
4B (Victoria (state)) Eastern Athletics	1

Fifth place
June 12 – Gold Coast
3B (Western Australia) Perth Metro East	1
3A (New South Wales) Ryde Red	11
Seventh place
June 12 – Gold Coast
4A (South Australia) Adelaide Rays	5
4B (Victoria (state)) Eastern Athletics	1

Consolation
June 11 – Gold Coast (F/4)
5A (Queensland) Gold Coast	13
6B (Australian Capital Territory) Canberra	1
June 11 – Gold Coast
5B (South Australia) Adelaide Marlins	12
6A (Victoria (state)) Northwestern Twins	4

Ninth place
June 12 – Gold Coast
5A (Queensland) Gold Coast	10
5B (South Australia) Adelaide Marlins	3
Eleventh place
June 12 – Gold Coast
6B (Australian Capital Territory) Canberra	2
6A (Victoria (state)) Northwestern Twins	6

=== Canada ===
The tournament took place in Regina, Saskatchewan from August 1–10. The top four teams advance to the semifinals.

Province	City	LL Organization	Record
British Columbia	Vancouver	Little Mountain	6–0
Quebec	Mirabel	Diamond Baseball	5–1
Saskatchewan (Host)	Regina	North Regina	3–3
Alberta	Calgary	Rocky Mountain	3–3
Ontario	Ottawa	Ottawa West	3–3
Nova Scotia	Sydney	Sydney and District #1	1–5
Saskatchewan	Moose Jaw	Moose Jaw	0–6

==== Bracket ====
Semi-finals
August 9 – Regina (F/5)
1 British Columbia	11
4 Alberta	0
August 9 – Regina
2 Quebec	2
3 Saskatchewan (Host)	3

Canada Championship
August 10 – Regina
1 British Columbia	3
3 Saskatchewan (Host)	4
Third place
Cancelled due to wet conditions
2 Quebec	–
4 Alberta	–

=== Caribbean ===
The tournament took place in Yabucoa, Puerto Rico from July 10–15.

Pool A
Country	City	LL Organization	Record
Curaçao	Willemstad	Pabou	4–0
Puerto Rico A	Yabucoa	Juan Antonio Bibiloni	2–2
Aruba	Santa Cruz	Braulio Wester Central	0–4

Pool B
Country	City	LL Organization	Record
Dominican Republic	La Vega	Prospectos Baseball Vegano	3–1
Puerto Rico B	Guayama	Radames López	3–1
US Virgin Islands	St. Thomas	Elrod Hendrick	0–4

Semi-finals
July 14 – Yabucoa
1A Curaçao	10
2B Puerto Rico B	1
July 14 – Yabucoa
1B Dominican Republic	5
2A Puerto Rico A	1

Caribbean Championship
July 15 – Yabucoa
1A Curaçao	6
1B Dominican Republic	0

=== Cuba ===
As part of a rotational schedule also involving Panama and Puerto Rico, the winner of the Cuba Region gained direct entry into the tournament in 2023. This was the first time a team from the nation of Cuba qualified for the LLWS. The tournament took place from February 11–March 5.

Round 1 (Feb. 11–12)
Isla de la Juventud	6	9	–
Consolación del Sur	9	18	–
San Antonio de los Baños	2	1	–
Habana del Este	4	11	–
San José	0	0	–
Matanzas	5	3	–
Cienfuegos	12	3	–
Santa Clara	14	13	–
S. Spiritus	10	10	14
Ciego de Ávila	11	7	3
Las Tunas	7	6	–
Camaguey	11	10	–
Holguin	0	2	–
Bayamo	10	10	–
Yateras	2	3	–
Santiago de Cuba	12	15	–

Round 2 (Feb. 18–19)
Consolación del Sur	7	3	–
Habana del Este	17	4	–
Matanzas	12	11	–
Santa Clara	5	1	–
S. Spiritus	3	5	1
Camaguey	4	1	17
Bayamo	21	5	10
Santiago de Cuba	2	7	0

Round 3 (Feb. 25–26)
Habana del Este	4	3	5
Matanzas	3	4	4
Bayamo	6	10	–
Camaguey	3	2	–

Championship (Mar. 4–5)
Habana del Este	7	4	2
Bayamo	5	10	6

=== Europe and Africa ===
The tournament took place in Kutno, Poland from July 22–29.

==== Qualifier tournament ====
Pool A
Country	City	LL Organization	Record
Ukraine A		Kyiv Baseball School	4–0
France		Provence-Alpes-Core-D'Azur	3–1
Switzerland		East/West	2–2
Poland		Orly Gdansk	0–4

Pool B
Country	City	LL Organization	Record
Germany		SouthEast	4–0
Israel		North	2–2
Lithuania		Vilnius	1–3
Ukraine B		Mykolaiv	0–4

==== Regional tournament ====
Teams
Country	City	LL Organization	Record
Austria	Vienna	East Austria	0–2
Croatia	Sisak	Croatia North	0–2
Czechia	Brno	South Czechia	5–0
France	Nice	SUD	1–2
Germany	Munchen	South-East Germany	2–2
Italy	Verona	Veneto	2–2
Netherlands	Utrecht	Midden-Nederland	5–2
Spain	Barcelona	Catalunya	2–2
Switzerland	Basel	Switzerland East/West	0–2
Ukraine	Kyiv	Kyiv Baseball School	2–2
UK	London	London	1–2

Upper round 1	Upper round 2	Upper round 3	Upper final	Final
July 23
July 22	Switzerland	0
July 25
Germany	7	Germany	10
Germany	5
Austria	0	July 22
Italy	7
Croatia	0
July 26
Italy	10
Italy	2
July 23
Czechia	4
July 22	Spain	2
July 25
Netherlands	6	Netherlands	3
Netherlands	3
Ukraine	5	July 23
Czechia	18
July 22	France	0
Czechia	16	Czechia	4	July 29
UK	0	Czechia	7
Netherlands	6
Lower round 1	Lower round 2	Lower round 3	Lower round 4	Lower final
July 24
July 26
UK	5
July 25	Netherlands	6
Switzerland	4	July 28
Ukraine	6	Ukraine	5
July 24	July 27	Italy	5
UK	0
Ukraine	10	Netherlands	4	Netherlands	9
Croatia	0	Spain	3
July 26
July 25	Germany	2
July 24	Spain	5	Spain	4
Austria	4	France	2
France	6

=== Japan ===
The tournament took place in Hachiōji, Tokyo from July 22–23.

Participating teams	Prefecture	City	LL Organization
Chūgoku Champions	Hiroshima	Hiroshima	Hiroshima Aki
Higashikanto Champions	Chiba	Funabashi	Funabashi
Kanagawa Champions	Kanagawa	Shōnan	Shōnan
Kansai Champions	Hyōgo	Takarazuka	Hyōgo Takarazuka
Kansai Runner-up	Osaka	Osaka	Osaka City
Kitakanto Champions	Saitama	Ōmiya	Ōmiya
Kyushu Champions	Nagasaki	Nagasaki	Nagasaki
Shikoku Champions	Ehime	Iyo	Ehime Chuo
Shin'etsu Champions	Niigata	Niigata	Niigata
Tōhoku Champions	Miyagi	Miyagi	Miyagi
Tōhoku Runner-up	Fukushima	Shirakawa	Shirakawa
Tōkai Champions	Aichi	Handa	Chita
Tōkai Runner-up	Shizuoka	Hamamatsu	Hamamatsu Minami
Tokyo Champions	Tokyo	Tokyo	Chōfu
Tokyo Runner-Up	Tokyo	Tokyo	Musashi Fuchu

July 21 – Hachiōji (F/5)
(Tokyo) Chōfu	13
July 21 – Hachiōji (F/5)
(Niigata Prefecture) Niigata	0
(Tokyo) Chōfu	14
July 21 – Hachiōji
(Hiroshima Prefecture) Hiroshima Aki	4
(Fukushima Prefecture) Shirakawa	2
July 22 – Hachiōji
(Hiroshima Prefecture) Hiroshima Aki	3
(Tokyo) Chōfu	7
July 21 – Hachiōji
(Kanagawa Prefecture) Shōnan	8
(Kanagawa Prefecture) Shōnan	5
July 21 – Hachiōji
(Osaka Prefecture) Osaka City	1
(Kanagawa Prefecture) Shōnan	5
July 21 – Hachiōji
(Saitama Prefecture) Ōmiya	0
(Saitama Prefecture) Ōmiya	2
July 22 – Hachiōji
(Aichi Prefecture) Chita	0
(Kanagawa Prefecture) Shōnan	0
July 21 – Hachiōji
(Tokyo) Musashi Fuchu	6
(Miyagi Prefecture) Miyagi	5
July 21 – Hachiōji
(Ehime Prefecture) Ehime Chuo	0
(Miyagi Prefecture) Miyagi	1
July 21 – Hachiōji
(Chiba Prefecture) Funabashi	4
(Chiba Prefecture) Funabashi	9
July 22 – Hachiōji
(Shizuoka Prefecture) Hamamatsu Minami	1
(Chiba Prefecture) Funabashi	5
July 21 – Hachiōji
(Tokyo) Musashi Fuchu	6
(Tokyo) Musashi Fuchu	9
July 21 – Hachiōji
(Hyōgo Prefecture) Hyōgo Takarazuka	0
(Tokyo) Musashi Fuchu	15
(Nagasaki Prefecture) Nagasaki	0

=== Latin America ===
The tournament took place in Maracaibo, Venezuela from July 2–8.

State	City	LL Organization	Record
Venezuela A	Maracaibo	San Francisco	4–0
Venezuela B	Barquisimeto	Cardenales	3–1
Colombia	Cartagena	Falcon	2–2
Chile	Santiago	Santiago Oriente	1–3
Costa Rica	Santo Domingo	Santo Domingo de Heredia	0–4

Semi-finals
July 7
1 Venezuela A	4
4 Chile	0
July 7
2 Venezuela B	9
3 Colombia	1

Latin America Championship
July 8
1 Venezuela A	2
2 Venezuela B	1

=== Mexico ===
The tournament took place in Monterrey, Nuevo León from July 1–7.

Pool A
State	City	LL Organization	Record
Tamaulipas	Matamoros	Villa del Refugio	5–1
Baja California	Tijuana	Municipal de Tijuana	5–1
Puebla	Cuautlancingo	Cuautlancingo	3–3
Nuevo León	San Nicolás	San Nicolás	3–3
Coahuila	Palaú	José Inés Castañeda	2–4
Chihuahua	Cd. Juárez	Satélite	1–5
Jalisco	Lagos de Moreno	Lagos de Moreno	1–5

Pool B
State	City	LL Organization	Record
Baja California	Mexicali	Seguro Social	6–0
Nuevo León	Guadalupe	Guadalupe Linda Vista	4–2
Tamaulipas	Matamoros	Matamoros	4–2
Chihuahua	Cd. Juárez	Granjero	3–3
Jalisco	Ocotlán	Ocotlán	3–3
Coahuila	Saltillo	Guayulera	1–5
CDMX	Mexico City	Maya	0–6

Semi-finals
July 6 – Monterrey
1A (Tamaulipas) Villa del Refugio	2
2B (Nuevo León) Guadalupe Linda Vista	0
July 6 – Monterrey
1B (Baja California) Seguro Social	1
2A (Baja California) Municipal de Tijuana	4

Mexico Championship
July 7 – Matamoros
1A (Tamaulipas) Villa del Refugio	0
2A (Baja California) Municipal de Tijuana	4

=== Panama ===
As part of a rotational schedule also involving Cuba and Puerto Rico, the winner of the Panama Region gained direct entry into the tournament in 2023. The tournament took place from February 11–26 in David, Aguadulce, and Juan Díaz.

==== Pool play - Zone 1 ====
Games 1–2
Bocas del Toro	5
Chiriqui	6
Chiriqui Occidente	7
Veraguas	8
Game 3
Bocas del Toro	2
Chiriqui Occidente	13

Game 4
Chiriqui	1
Veraguas	6
Game 5
Chiriqui	3
Chiriqui Occidente	2

Zone Championship
Veraguas	8	–
Chiriqui	6	–

==== Pool play - Zone 2 ====
Games 1–2
Panamá Oeste	6
Coclé	1
Los Santos	4
Herrera	5
Game 3
Coclé	1
Los Santos	0

Game 4
Panamá Oeste	7
Herrera	4
Game 5
Herrera	5
Coclé	6

Zone Championship
Panamá Oeste	0	6
Coclé	6	2

==== Pool play - Zone 3 ====
Games 1–2
Panamá Este	3
Colon	5
Panamá Metro	9
Darien	2
Game 3
Panamá Este	11
Darien	5

Game 4
Colon	10
Panamá Metro	5
Game 5
Panamá Metro	6
Panamá Este	5

Zone Championship
Colon	11	–
Panamá Metro	4	–

==== Elimination round ====
Semifinals
Coclé	7
Panama Oeste	2
Veraguas	9
Colon	2

Panama Championship
Coclé	7	3	1
Veraguas	2	5	2
