= Little League World Series (Metro Region) =

Children's baseball tournament

Metro Region
- Most recent season or competition: 2026 Little League World Series qualification
- Sport: Baseball
- Founded: 2022; 4 years ago
- No. of teams: 4
- Country: United States
- Most recent champion: Bayonne Central Little League Bayonne, New Jersey
- Most titles: (New York (state)) New York (2)
- Website: Little League Baseball Metro Region

The Metro Region is one of ten United States regions that currently send teams to the Little League World Series, the largest youth baseball competition in the world. The region was created in 2022 when the LLWS was expanded from 16 teams (eight U.S. teams and eight "International" teams from the rest of the world) to 20 teams (ten U.S. and ten International).

The Metro Region is made up of four states.

- Connecticut
- New Jersey
- New York
- Rhode Island

== Regional Championship ==
The list below lists each state's participant in the Metro Little League Region Tournament. That year's winner is indicated in green.

=== 2022–present ===
Year	Connecticut	New Jersey	(New York (state)) New York	Rhode Island
2022	Fairfield American LL; Fairfield	Toms River East LL; Toms River	Massapequa Coast LL; Massapequa	Cumberland LL; Cumberland
2023	East Lyme LL; East Lyme	East Hanover LL; East Hanover	Massapequa Coast LL; Massapequa	Smithfield LL; Smithfield
2024	East Lyme/Salem LL; East Lyme	Morristown Area LL; Morristown	South Shore LL; Staten Island	North Kingstown/Wickford LL; North Kingstown
2025	Fairfield National LL; Fairfield	Jackson Holbrook LL; Jackson	St. James/Smithtown LL; Smithtown	Burrillville LL; Burrillville
2026	Darien LL; Darien	Bayonne Central LL; Bayonne	PYA LL; Port Washington	Lincoln LL; Lincoln

== LLWS results ==
As of the 2026 Little League World Series.

Year	Champion	City	LLWS	Record
2022	Massapequa Coast LL	(New York (state)) Massapequa	Round 2	0–2
2023	Smithfield LL	(Rhode Island) Smithfield	Round 3	2–2
2024	South Shore LL	(New York (state)) Staten Island	Round 3	2–2
2025	Fairfield National LL	(Connecticut) Fairfield	Third place	5–1
2026	Bayonne Central LL	(New Jersey) Bayonne	Round 3	2–2

=== Results by state ===
As of the 2026 Little League World Series.

State	Metro Championships	LLWS Championships	Record in LLWS	PCT
(New York (state)) New York	2	0	2–4	.333
Connecticut	1	0	5–1	.833
New Jersey	1	0	2–2	.500
Rhode Island	1	0	2–2	.500
Total	5	0	11–9	.550

== See also ==
- Little League World Series (Mid-Atlantic Region)
- Little League World Series (New England Region)
