= 2022 Little League World Series qualification =

Children's baseball tournament

United States
- Great Lakes winner: Hagerstown, Indiana
- Metro winner: (New York (state)) Massapequa, New York
- Mid-Atlantic winner: Hollidaysburg, Pennsylvania
- Midwest winner: Davenport, Iowa
- Mountain winner: Santa Clara, Utah
- New England winner: Middleborough, Massachusetts
- Northwest winner: (Washington (state)) Bonney Lake, Washington
- Southeast winner: Nolensville, Tennessee
- Southwest winner: Pearland, Texas
- West winner: Honolulu, Hawaii

International
- Asia-Pacific and Middle East winner: Taipei, Taiwan
- Australia winner: (Australia) Brisbane, Queensland
- Canada winner: (Canada) Vancouver, British Columbia
- Caribbean winner: Willemstad, Curaçao
- Europe and Africa winner: Bologna, Italy
- Japan winner: (Japan) Takarazuka, Hyōgo
- Latin America winner: Managua, Nicaragua
- Mexico winner: (Mexico) Matamoros, Tamaulipas
- Panama winner: (Panama) Aguadulce, Coclé
- Puerto Rico winner: Guaynabo, Puerto Rico

Tournaments

Qualification for the 2022 Little League World Series took place in ten United States regions and ten international regions from February through August 2022. International regions will gain entry to the tournament after the 2021 tournament consisted of only teams from the United States as a result of the COVID-19 pandemic.

This is the first year that 20 teams will qualify for the Little League World Series. In the United States, two new regions were created (Metro and Mountain) made up of states being pulled from already existing regions. On the international side, a rotational schedule consisting of Cuba, Panama, and Puerto Rico will begin. Two teams from the three countries will automatically qualify for the LLWS, while the third may still qualify through its normal regional tournament. In 2022, the two teams qualifying automatically are Panama and Puerto Rico. Cuba will compete in the Caribbean Region tournament in 2022 but will directly qualify in 2023 and 2024.

== United States ==
=== Great Lakes ===
The tournament took place in Whitestown, Indiana from August 6–11.

State	City	LL Organization	Record
Illinois	Hinsdale	Hinsdale	0–2
Indiana	Hagerstown	Hagerstown	3–0
Kentucky	London	North Laurel	3–2
Michigan	Grosse Pointe Farms	Grosse Pointe Farms-City	1–2
Ohio	Hamilton	West Side	1–2

Upper round 1
August 6 – Game 1
Illinois	4
Kentucky	5
Lower round 1
August 7 – Game 4
Illinois	3
Michigan	6

Upper round 2
August 7 – Game 3
Kentucky	7
Ohio	6
August 6 – Game 2
Indiana	6
Michigan	2
Lower round 2
August 8 – Game 5
Ohio	8
Michigan	6

Upper final
August 9 – Game 6
Kentucky	1
Indiana	3
Lower final
August 10 – Game 7
Kentucky	1
Ohio	0

Final
August 11 – Championship (F/7)
Indiana	4
Kentucky	3

=== Metro ===
The tournament took place in Bristol, Connecticut from August 6–12.

State	City	LL Organization	Record
Connecticut	Fairfield	Fairfield American	1–2
New Jersey	Toms River	Toms River East	2–2
New York	Massapequa	Massapequa Coast	3–0
Rhode Island	Cumberland	Cumberland	0–2

August 6 – Game 1 (F/7)
New York	6
August 8 – Game 4
New Jersey	3
New York	7
August 6 – Game 2
Connecticut	5
Connecticut	3
August 12 – Championship
Rhode Island	1
New York	4
New Jersey	0
August 10 – Game 5
Connecticut	1
August 7 – Game 3
New Jersey	3
New Jersey	3
Rhode Island	2

=== Mid-Atlantic ===
The tournament took place in Bristol, Connecticut from August 7–12.

State	City	LL Organization	Record
Delaware	Wilmington	Naamans	2–1
Maryland	Williamsport	Conococheague	0–2
Pennsylvania	Hollidaysburg	Hollidaysburg Area Summer Baseball	3–1
Washington, D.C.		Northwest Washington	1–2

August 7 – Game 1
Pennsylvania	7
August 9 – Game 4
Washington, D.C.	3
Pennsylvania	4
August 7 – Game 2
Delaware	5
Delaware	2
August 12 – Championship
Maryland	1
Delaware	3
Pennsylvania	7
August 11 – Game 5 (F/4)
Pennsylvania	13
August 8 – Game 3
Washington, D.C.	0
Washington, D.C.	12
Maryland	5

=== Midwest ===
The tournament took place in Whitestown, Indiana from August 5–12.

State	City	LL Organization	Record
Iowa	Davenport	Davenport Southeast	4–1
Kansas	Pittsburg	J.L. Hutchinson Baseball	1–2
Minnesota	Coon Rapids	Coon Rapids Andover American	2–2
Missouri	Webb City	Webb City	3–1
Nebraska	Kearney	Kearney	0–2
North Dakota	Fargo	Fargo	3–2
South Dakota	Sioux Falls	Sioux Falls	0–2
Wisconsin	Kenosha	Little Leaguers of Kenosha	1–2

Upper round 1	Upper round 2	Upper final	Final
August 5 – Game 1
Minnesota	2
August 7 – Game 7 (F/5)
North Dakota	5
North Dakota	7
August 5 – Game 2
Missouri	17
South Dakota	4
August 10 – Game 12
Missouri	5
Missouri	3
August 5 – Game 3
Iowa	1
Kansas	3
August 7 – Game 8
Iowa	10
Iowa	3
August 5 – Game 4
Wisconsin	2
Nebraska	0	August 12 – Championship (F/7)
Wisconsin	9	Missouri	3
Iowa	4
Lower round 1	Lower round 2	Lower round 3	Lower final
August 8 – Game 9
August 6 – Game 5	Minnesota	3	August 11 – Game 13
Minnesota	5	Wisconsin	1	August 9 – Game 11	Iowa	3
South Dakota	4	Minnesota	3	North Dakota	2
August 8 – Game 10	North Dakota	12
August 6 – Game 6	Kansas	6
Kansas	7	North Dakota	10
Nebraska	0

=== Mountain ===
The tournament took place in San Bernardino, California from August 7–12.

State	City	LL Organization	Record
Montana	Billings	Boulder Arrowhead	1–2
Nevada	Henderson	Paseo Verde	2–2
Utah	Santa Clara	Snow Canyon	3–0
Wyoming	Gillette	Gillette	0–2

August 7 – Game 1
Nevada	4
August 9 – Game 4
Montana	2
Nevada	4
August 7 – Game 2
Utah	5
Wyoming	4
August 12 – Championship
Utah	7
Utah	7
Nevada	3
August 11 – Game 5
Nevada	5
August 8 – Game 3 (F/4)
Montana	1
Montana	11
Wyoming	0

=== New England ===
The tournament took place in Bristol, Connecticut from August 6–11.

State	City	LL Organization	Record
Maine	Bangor	Bangor East	2–1
Massachusetts	Middleboro	Middleboro	3–1
New Hampshire	Concord	Concord	1–2
Vermont	Brattleboro	Brattleboro	0–2

August 6 – Game 1
Vermont	0
August 8 – Game 4
Maine	3
Maine	10
August 6 – Game 2
Massachusetts	4
Massachusetts	1
August 11 – Championship
New Hampshire	0
Maine	1
Massachusetts	10
August 10 – Game 5 (F/5)
Massachusetts	11
August 7 – Game 3
New Hampshire	0
Vermont	0
New Hampshire	2

=== Northwest ===
The tournament took place in San Bernardino, California from August 6–11.

State	City	LL Organization	Record
Alaska	Anchorage	Abbott-O-Rabbit	0–2
Idaho	Lewiston	Lewiston	1–2
Oregon	Bend	Bend North	2–2
Washington	Bonney Lake	Bonney Lake/Sumner	3–0

August 6 – Game 1
Oregon	1
August 8 – Game 4
Washington	10
Washington	9
August 6 – Game 2
Idaho	6
Idaho	3
August 11 – Championship (F/7)
Alaska	1
Washington	3
Oregon	2
August 10 – Game 5
Idaho	3
August 7 – Game 3 (F/4)
Oregon	4
Oregon	12
Alaska	2

=== Southeast ===
The tournament took place in Warner Robins, Georgia from August 4–9.

State	City	LL Organization	Record
Alabama	Sylacauga	Sylacauga	0–2
Florida	Tampa	Keystone	1–2
Georgia	Hamilton	Harris County	2–2
North Carolina	Durham	Bull City	2–2
South Carolina	Taylors	Northwood	1–2
Tennessee	Nolensville	Nolensville	4–0
Virginia	South Riding	Loudoun South American	4–2
West Virginia	Bridgeport	Bridgeport	0–2

Upper round 1	Upper round 2	Upper final	Final
August 4 – Game 1
South Carolina	2
August 5 – Game 7
Florida	1
South Carolina	0
August 4 – Game 2 (F/5)
Tennessee	3
Tennessee	11
August 7 – Game 12
Alabama	0
Tennessee	9
August 4 – Game 3 (F/4)
Georgia	3
Georgia	12
August 5 – Game 8
West Virginia	0
Georgia	2
August 4 – Game 4 (F/7)
Virginia	1
North Carolina	3	August 9 – Championship
Virginia	4	Tennessee	5
Virginia	2
Lower round 1	Lower round 2	Lower round 3	Lower final
August 6 – Game 9
August 5 – Game 5 (F/4)	Florida	1	August 8 – Game 13
Florida	17	Virginia	7	August 7 – Game 11	Georgia	1
Alabama	1	Virginia	6	Virginia	4
August 6 – Game 10 (F/10)	North Carolina	4
August 5 – Game 6 (F/7)	North Carolina	5
West Virginia	5	South Carolina	4
North Carolina	6

=== Southwest ===
The tournament took place in Waco, Texas from August 4–9.

State	City	LL Organization	Record
Arkansas	White Hall	White Hall	1–2
Colorado	Glenwood Springs	Three Rivers	0–2
Louisiana	Kenner	Eastbank	1–2
Mississippi	Starkville	Starkville	2–2
New Mexico	Albuquerque	Eastdale	0–2
Oklahoma	Tulsa	Tulsa National	4–2
Texas East	Pearland	Pearland	4–0
Texas West	Abilene	Wylie	2–2

Upper round 1	Upper round 2	Upper final	Final
August 4 – Game 1
Mississippi	7
August 5 – Game 7
New Mexico	1
Mississippi	4
August 4 – Game 2 (F/5)
Texas East	6
Arkansas	2
August 7 – Game 12 (F/4)
Texas East	14
Texas East	19
August 4 – Game 3 (F/4)
Texas West	0
Oklahoma	10
August 5 – Game 8 (F/7)
Colorado	0
Oklahoma	2
August 4 – Game 4 (F/7)
Texas West	3
Texas West	4	August 9 – Championship
Louisiana	3	Texas East	9
Oklahoma	4
Lower round 1	Lower round 2	Lower round 3	Lower final
August 6 – Game 9
August 5 – Game 5	Arkansas	7	August 8 – Game 13
New Mexico	3	Oklahoma	15	August 7 – Game 11	Texas West	1
Arkansas	9	Oklahoma	4	Oklahoma	2
August 6 – Game 10	Mississippi	3
August 5 – Game 6	Louisiana	5
Colorado	4	Mississippi	7
Louisiana	8

=== West ===
The tournament took place in San Bernardino, California from August 6–12.

State	City	LL Organization	Record
Arizona	Peoria	Sidewinder	2–2
Hawaii	Honolulu	Honolulu	3–0
Northern California	Rocklin	Tri-City	1–2
Southern California	Glendora	Glendora American	0–2

August 6 – Game 1
Arizona	0
August 8 – Game 4 (F/5)
Northern California	5
Northern California	3
August 6 – Game 2
Hawaii	13
Hawaii	3
August 12 – Championship
Southern California	0
Hawaii	9
Arizona	2
August 10 – Game 5
Northern California	1
August 7 – Game 3
Arizona	8
Arizona	7
Southern California	6

== International ==
=== Asia-Pacific ===
The tournament took place in Hwaseong, South Korea from June 29–July 4.

==== Teams ====
Country	LL Organization	Record
Chinese Taipei	Fu-Lin	4–1
South Korea		3–1
Guam		1–2
Hong Kong		1–2
New Zealand		0–2
Philippines		1–2

==== Bracket ====
Upper round 1
June 29 – Game 1
Guam	0
South Korea	17
June 29 – Game 2
Hong Kong	10
New Zealand	0
Lower round 1
July 1 – Game 5
Guam	8
Hong Kong	1
July 1 – Game 6
New Zealand	0
Chinese Taipei	15

Upper round 2
June 30 – Game 3
Chinese Taipei	1
South Korea	2
June 30 – Game 4
Philippines	7
Hong Kong	0
Lower round 2
July 2 – Game 8
Guam	0
Chinese Taipei	6

Upper final
July 2 – Game 7
South Korea	10
Philippines	1
Lower final
July 3 – Game 9
Philippines	0
Chinese Taipei	12

Final
July 4 – Championship
South Korea	0
Chinese Taipei	1

=== Australia ===
The tournament took place in Macquarie Fields, New South Wales from June 8–13.

==== Pool A ====
Pos	Team	Pld	W	L	RF	RA	RD	PCT	Qualification
1	(New South Wales) Hills	5	4	1	39	21	+18	.800	Advance to semi-finals
2	(Queensland) Brisbane North	5	4	1	48	17	+31	.800	Advance to semi-finals
3	(South Australia) Adelaide Marlins	5	3	2	43	19	+24	.600	
4	(Western Australia) Carine Cats	5	2	3	24	54	−30	.400	
5	(Victoria (state)) Northwestern Twins	5	2	3	22	41	−19	.400	
6	(Australian Capital Territory) Canberra	5	0	5	25	49	−24	.000	

Source: Little League

==== Pool B ====
Pos	Team	Pld	W	L	RF	RA	RD	PCT	Qualification
1	(New South Wales) Ryde Black	5	5	0	57	4	+53	1.000	Advance to semi-finals
2	(Western Australia) Coastal Bay	5	3	2	41	28	+13	.600	Advance to semi-finals
3	(Victoria (state)) Southern Mariners	5	3	2	59	36	+23	.600	
4	(Queensland) Brisbane Metro	5	3	2	43	38	+5	.600	
5	(South Australia) Adelaide Seahawks	5	1	4	33	52	−19	.200	
6	(New South Wales) Newcastle	5	0	5	9	84	−75	.000	

Source: Little League

==== Bracket ====
Semi-finals
June 12 – Macquarie Fields
1A (New South Wales) Hills	5
2B (Western Australia) Coastal Bay	0
June 12 – Macquarie Fields
1B (New South Wales) Ryde Black	2
2A (Queensland) Brisbane North	4

Australia Championship
June 13 – Macquarie Fields
1A (New South Wales) Hills	3
2A (Queensland) Brisbane North	9
Third place
June 13 – Macquarie Fields
2B (Western Australia) Coastal Bay	3
1B (New South Wales) Ryde Black	9

Consolation
June 12 – Macquarie Fields
3B (Victoria (state)) Southern Mariners	10
4A (Western Australia) Carine Cats	0
June 12 – Macquarie Fields
3A (South Australia) Adelaide Marlins	11
4B (Queensland) Brisbane Metro	5

Fifth place
June 13 – Macquarie Fields
3B (Victoria (state)) Southern Mariners	7
3A (South Australia) Adelaide Marlins	3
Seventh place
June 13 – Macquarie Fields
4A (Western Australia) Carine Cats	5
4B (Queensland) Brisbane Metro	3

Consolation
June 12 – Macquarie Fields
5A (Victoria (state)) Northwestern Twins	16
6B (New South Wales) Newcastle	1
June 12 – Macquarie Fields
5B (South Australia) Adelaide Seahawks	13
6A (Australian Capital Territory) Canberra	1

Ninth place
June 13 – Macquarie Fields
5A (Victoria (state)) Northwestern Twins	11
5B (South Australia) Adelaide Seahawks	1
Eleventh place
June 13 – Macquarie Fields
6B (New South Wales) Newcastle	3
6A (Australian Capital Territory) Canberra	5

=== Canada ===
The tournament took place in Calgary, Alberta from August 4–12.

Pos	Team	Pld	W	L	RF	RA	RD	PCT	Qualification
1	(British Columbia) Little Mountain	6	6	0	89	17	+72	1.000	Advance to semi-finals
2	(Saskatchewan) Moose Jaw	6	5	1	40	36	+4	.833	Advance to semi-finals
3	(Alberta) Calgary West	6	4	2	38	36	+2	.667	Advance to semi-finals
4	(Alberta) Rocky Mountain (H)	6	3	3	41	29	+12	.500	Advance to semi-finals
5	(Quebec) Diamond Baseball	6	2	4	47	53	−6	.333	
6	(Ontario) Ancaster	6	1	5	19	54	−35	.167	
7	(Nova Scotia) Sydney and District #1	6	0	6	17	66	−49	.000	

Source: Little League
(H) Hosts

==== Bracket ====
Semi-finals
August 11 – Calgary
1 British Columbia	3
4 Alberta (Host)	2
August 11 – Calgary
2 Saskatchewan	5
3 Alberta	2

Canada Championship
August 12 – Calgary
1 British Columbia	9
2 Saskatchewan	4
Third place
August 11 – Calgary
3 Alberta	12
4 Alberta (Host)	5

=== Caribbean ===
The tournament took place in Punta Cana, Dominican Republic from July 6–9.

==== Pool A ====
Pos	Team	Pld	W	L	RF	RA	RD	PCT	Qualification	(Curaçao)	(Aruba)	(Dominican Republic)
1	(Curaçao) Pabao	4	3	1	24	15	+9	.750	Advance to semi-finals	—	9–4	1–0
2	Aruba North	4	2	2	23	30	−7	.500	Advance to semi-finals	5–12	—	6–4
3	(Dominican Republic) Los Bravos de Pontezuela	4	1	3	15	17	−2	.250		6–2	5–8	—

Source: Little League

==== Pool B ====
Pos	Team	Pld	W	L	RF	RA	RD	PCT	Qualification	(Cuba)	(Curaçao)	(Dominican Republic)
1	(Cuba) Liga Santa Clara de Santa Clara	4	3	1	29	12	+17	.750	Advance to semi-finals	—	8–1	15–8
2	(Curaçao) Pariba	4	2	2	12	15	−3	.500	Advance to semi-finals	1–2	—	7–1
3	(Dominican Republic) Eduardo Sosa	4	1	3	15	29	−14	.250		2–4	4–3	—

Source: Little League

==== Bracket ====
Semi-finals
July 9 – Punta Cana
1A (Curaçao) Pabao	2
2B (Curaçao) Pariba	1
July 9 – Punta Cana
1B (Cuba) Liga Santa Clara de Santa Clara	8
2A Aruba North	2

Caribbean Championship
July 9 – Punta Cana
1A (Curaçao) Pabao	3
1B (Cuba) Liga Santa Clara de Santa Clara	1
Third place
July 9 – Punta Cana
2B (Curaçao) Pariba	2
2A Aruba North	6

=== Europe and Africa ===
The tournament took place in Moergestel, Netherlands from July 16 to 22.

Teams
Country	City	LL Organization	Record
Austria	Vienna	East Austria	2–2
Croatia	Sisak	Croatia North	1–2
Czech Republic	Brno	South Czech Republic	3–1
Italy	Bologna	Emilia Romagna	4–1
Netherlands	Haarlem	Kennemerland	3–2
Spain	Barcelona	Catalunya	3–2
Switzerland	Basel	Switzerland East/West	0–2
Ukraine	Odesa/Mykolaiv/Kyiv	Odesa/Mykolaiv/Kyiv	0–2
United Kingdom	London	London	0–2

==== Bracket ====
Upper round 1	Upper round 2	Upper round 3	Upper final	Final
Croatia	5
Netherlands	9	Netherlands	15
Netherlands	0
United Kingdom	5
Czech Republic	10
Czech Republic	7
Austria	1
Czech Republic	1
Italy	0
Spain	10
Switzerland	1
Spain	1
Italy	11
Italy	16
Ukraine	2	Czech Republic	1
Italy	4
Lower round 1	Lower round 2	Lower round 3	Lower round 4	Lower final
Netherlands	7
Switzerland	3	Austria	5	Italy	4
United Kingdom	10	Austria	4	Netherlands	6	Spain	1
Austria	21	Spain	7
Spain	10
Croatia	11	Croatia	1
Ukraine	0

=== Japan ===
The tournament took place in Hachiōji, Tokyo from July 23 to 24. Prior to the start of the tournament, Musashi Fuchi LL and Ryūgasaki LL decided to withdraw due to positive COVID tests among their players and/or coaching staff. Therefore, their first round opponents were given an automatic bye to the quarterfinal round.

Participating teams	Prefecture	City	LL Organization
Chūgoku Champions	Hiroshima	Hiroshima	Hiroshima Aki
Higashikanto Champions	Ibaraki	Ryūgasaki	Ryūgasaki
Kanagawa Champions	Kanagawa	Hiratsuka	Hiratsuka
Kansai Champions	Hyōgo	Takarazuka	Takarazuka
Kansai Runner-up	Osaka	Hirakata	Hirakata
Kitakanto Champions	Saitama	Ōmiya	Ōmiya Higashi
Kyushu Champions	Nagasaki	Nagasaki	Nagasaki Chuo
Shikoku Champions	Ehime	Matsuyama	Ehime
Shin'etsu Champions	Nagano	Matsumoto	Matsumoto Minami
Tōhoku Champions	Miyagi	Miyagi	Miyagi
Tōhoku Runner-up	Iwate	Mizusawa	Mizusawa
Tōkai Champions	Aichi	Anjō	Anjō
Tōkai Runner-up	Aichi	Toyota	Toyota
Tokyo Champions	Tokyo	Tokyo	Tokyo Kitasuna
Tokyo Runner-Up	Tokyo	Tokyo	Musashi Fuchu

July 23 – Hachiōji
Tokyo Kitasuna	11
July 23 – Hachiōji (F/8)
(Osaka Prefecture) Hirakata	1
Tokyo Kitasuna	5
July 23 – Hachiōji
(Iwate Prefecture) Mizusawa	2
(Iwate Prefecture) Mizusawa	10
July 24 – Hachiōji
(Nagasaki Prefecture) Nagasaki Chuo	2
Tokyo Kitasuna	3
July 23 – Hachiōji
(Hiroshima Prefecture) Hiroshima Aki	7
(Saitama Prefecture) Ōmiya Higashi	5
July 23 – Hachiōji
(Ehime Prefecture) Ehime	6
(Ehime Prefecture) Ehime	1
July 23 – Hachiōji
(Hiroshima Prefecture) Hiroshima Aki	9
(Hiroshima Prefecture) Hiroshima Aki	1
July 24 – Hachiōji
(Aichi Prefecture) Anjo	0
(Hiroshima Prefecture) Hiroshima Aki	3
July 23 – Hachiōji
(Hyōgo Prefecture) Takarazuka	12
(Kanagawa Prefecture) Hiratsuka	4
July 23 – Hachiōji
(Aichi Prefecture) Toyota	6
(Aichi Prefecture) Toyota	2
July 23 – Hachiōji (Forfeit)
(Miyagi Prefecture) Miyagi	4
(Tokyo) Musashi Fuchu	0
July 24 – Hachiōji
(Miyagi Prefecture) Miyagi	6
(Miyagi Prefecture) Miyagi	6
July 23 – Hachiōji (Forfeit)
(Hyōgo Prefecture) Takarazuka	14
(Ibaraki Prefecture) Ryūgasaki	0
July 23 – Hachiōji
(Hyōgo Prefecture) Takarazuka	6
(Hyōgo Prefecture) Takarazuka	10
(Nagano Prefecture) Matsumoto Minami	0

=== Latin America ===
The tournament took place in Managua, Nicaragua from July 2–9.

Country	City	LL Organization	Record
Nicaragua (B)	Managua	14 de Septiembre	4–1
Venezuela	San Francisco	San Francisco	4–1
Nicaragua (A)	Chinandega	Hermanos por Cristo	3–2
Honduras	San Pedro Sula	Marinera	1–4
Costa Rica	Santo Domingo	Costa Rica	0–4

Semi-finals
July 8 – Managua
1 Nicaragua (B)	6
4 Honduras	0
July 8 – Managua
2 Venezuela	10
3 Nicaragua (A)	2

Latin America Championship
July 9 – Managua
1 Nicaragua (B)	10
2 Venezuela	0

=== Mexico ===
The tournament took place in Matamoros, Tamaulipas from July 10 to 14.

Pool A
State	City	LL Organization	Record
Tamaulipas	Matamoros	Matamoros	4–1
Baja California	Tijuana	Municipal de Tijuana	4–1
Coahuila	Palaú	José Inés Castañeda	3–2
Veracruz	Medellín	Ramón Arano	2–3
Nuevo León	Monterrey	Unidad Modelo	1–4
Jalisco	San Miguel el Alto	San Miguel el Alto	0–5

Pool B
State	City	LL Organization	Record
Sonora	Navojoa	Mario Manos de Seda Mendoza	6–0
Nuevo León	San Nicolás de los Garza	San Nicolás	4–2
Tamaulipas	Reynosa	Guadalupe Treviño Kelly	4–2
Coahuila	Sabinas	Juvenil de Sabinas	3–3
CDMX	Mexico City	Maya	3–3
Nayarit	Tepic	Liga Kora	1–5
Chihuahua	Delicias	A Cura Trillo	0–6

Semi-finals
July 14 – Matamoros
1A (Tamaulipas) Matamoros	5
2B (Nuevo León) San Nicolás	5
July 14 – Matamoros
1B (Sonora) Mario Manos de Seda Mendoza	1
2A (Baja California) Municipal de Tijuana	5

Mexico Championship
July 14 – Matamoros
1A (Tamaulipas) Matamoros	3
2A (Baja California) Municipal de Tijuana	2

=== Panama ===
In February 2022, Aguadulce Cabezera Little League won the Panama Region championship after defeating Villa de Los Santos Little League by a 12–0 final score. Overall, the team finished with a 5–0 record and outscored their opponents 30–3.

=== Puerto Rico ===
The double elimination tournament began May 28 and ended on July 2.

==== Bracket ====
Upper round 1	Upper round 2	Upper round 3	Upper final	Final
1	Toa Baja	0
Guayama	15
8	Guayama	9
9	Caguas	5
Guayama	0
Vega Baja	7
5	Arroyo	1
12	Vega Baja	17
Vega Baja	6
Yabucoa	0
4	Caguas JB	4
13	Yabucoa	15
Vega Baja	2
Amelia Guaynabo	0
6	Huskie Reds	11
11	Cayey	4
Huskie Reds	8
Huskie Blue	9
3	Huskie Blue	5
14	Rexville	3
Huskie Blue	1
Amelia Guaynabo	8
7	Sabana Grande	1
Vega Baja	1	5
10	Loiza	11
Loiza	7	Amelia Guaynabo	3	6
2	Amelia Guaynabo	13
Lower round 1	Lower round 2	Lower round 3	Lower round 4	Lower round 5	Lower final
Loiza	11
Guayama	1
Arroyo	9	Arroyo	1
Loiza	2	Caguas	8
Caguas JB	7
Caguas	5	Amelia Guaynabo	7
Caguas	13
Caguas	4	Huskie Blue	6
Huskie Reds	7
Huskie Blue	6
Sabana Grande	2
Huskie Blue	8
Yabucoa	13
Yabucoa	10	Yabucoa	1
Cayey	0
Rexville	1
Rexville	12	Toa Baja	2
Rexville	12
