= 2024 Little League World Series qualification =

Youth baseball tournament

United States
- Great Lakes winner: Hinsdale, Illinois
- Metro winner: (New York (state)) Staten Island, New York
- Mid-Atlantic winner: Newtown, Pennsylvania
- Midwest winner: Sioux Falls, South Dakota
- Mountain winner: Henderson, Nevada
- New England winner: Salem, New Hampshire
- Northwest winner: (Washington (state)) Puyallup, Washington
- Southeast winner: Lake Mary, Florida
- Southwest winner: Boerne, Texas
- West winner: Wailuku, Hawaii

International
- Asia-Pacific and Middle East winner: Taoyuan, Chinese Taipei
- Australia winner: Sydney, New South Wales
- Canada winner: (Canada) Surrey, British Columbia
- Caribbean winner: Santa Cruz, Aruba
- Cuba winner: Santa Clara
- Europe and Africa winner: Brno, Czech Republic
- Japan winner: Tokyo
- Latin America winner: Barquisimeto, Venezuela
- Mexico winner: Matamoros, Tamaulipas
- Puerto Rico winner: Guayama

Tournaments

Qualification for the 2024 Little League World Series took place in ten United States regions and ten international regions from February through August 2024.

== United States ==
=== Great Lakes ===
The tournament took place in Whitestown, Indiana from August 3–7.

State	City	LL Organization	Record
Illinois	Hinsdale	Hinsdale	3–0
Indiana	Jasper	Jasper National	3–2
Kentucky	Bowling Green	Bowling Green East	2–2
Michigan	Tecumseh	Tecumseh Area	0–2
Ohio	Hamilton	West Side	0–2

Upper round 1
August 3 – Game 1
Kentucky	7
Michigan	1
Lower round 1
August 4 – Game 4 (F/5)
Michigan	1
Indiana	11

Upper round 2
August 4 – Game 3
Ohio	0
Kentucky	1
August 3 – Game 2
Illinois	3
Indiana	0
Lower round 2
August 5 – Game 5
Ohio	3
Indiana	4

Upper final
August 5 – Game 6 (F/7)
Kentucky	2
Illinois	3
Lower final
August 6 – Game 7
Kentucky	3
Indiana	5

Final
August 7 – Championship (F/8)
Illinois	8
Indiana	7

=== Metro ===
The tournament took place in Bristol, Connecticut from August 3–9.

State	City	LL Organization	Record
Connecticut	East Lyme	East Lyme/Salem	1–2
New Jersey	Morristown	Morristown Area	2–1
New York	Staten Island	South Shore	3–1
Rhode Island	North Kingstown	North Kingstown/Wickford	0–2

August 3 – Game 1
New Jersey	8
August 5 – Game 4
Connecticut	4
New Jersey	11
August 4 – Game 2 (F/5)
New York	1
New York	17
August 9 – Championship
Rhode Island	7
New Jersey	0
New York	5
August 7 – Game 5 (F/7)
New York	6
August 5 – Game 3 (F/5)
Connecticut	5
Connecticut	13
Rhode Island	2

=== Mid-Atlantic ===
The tournament took place in Bristol, Connecticut from August 4–9.

State	City	LL Organization	Record
Delaware	Middletown	M-O-T	0–2
Maryland	Salisbury	West Salisbury	1–2
Pennsylvania	Newtown	Council Rock Newtown	3–0
Washington, D.C.		Capitol Hill	2–2

August 4 – Game 1
Delaware	3
August 6 – Game 4 (F/4)
Maryland	5
Maryland	1
August 4 – Game 2
Pennsylvania	11
Washington, D.C.	1
August 9 – Championship
Pennsylvania	13
Pennsylvania	5
Washington, D.C.	1
August 8 – Game 5
Maryland	1
August 5 – Game 3
Washington, D.C.	6
Delaware	0
Washington, D.C.	1

=== Midwest ===
The tournament took place in Whitestown, Indiana from August 2–9.

State	City	LL Organization	Record
Iowa	Davenport	Davenport Southeast	3–2
Kansas	Riverton	Riverton Area	1–2
Minnesota	St. Louis Park	St. Louis Park	2–2
Missouri	Webb City	Webb City	3–1
Nebraska	South Sioux City	Cardinal	0–2
North Dakota	Fargo	Fargo	0–2
South Dakota	Sioux Falls	Sioux Falls	4–1
Wisconsin	Kenosha	Little Leaguers of Kenosha American	1–2

Upper round 1	Upper round 2	Upper final	Final
August 2 – Game 1
Nebraska	3
August 3 – Game 5
Missouri	14
Missouri	3
August 2 – Game 2
Iowa	2
Iowa	12
August 7 – Game 12
Kansas	3
Missouri	6
August 2 – Game 3 (F/5)
South Dakota	4
South Dakota	11
August 4 – Game 6 (F/5)
North Dakota	1
South Dakota	12
August 3 – Game 4
Minnesota	0
Wisconsin	8	August 9 – Championship
Minnesota	9	Missouri	1
South Dakota	6
Lower round 1	Lower round 2	Lower round 3	Lower final
August 5 – Game 9
August 4 – Game 7	Minnesota	16	August 8 – Game 13 (F/7)
Nebraska	5	Kansas	6	August 6 – Game 11 (F/4)	South Dakota	3
Kansas	6	Minnesota	0	Iowa	0
August 5 – Game 10	Iowa	15
August 4 – Game 8 (F/4)	Iowa	6
North Dakota	1	Wisconsin	4
Wisconsin	11

=== Mountain ===
The tournament took place in San Bernardino, California from August 3–9.

State	City	LL Organization	Record
Colorado	Boulder	North Boulder	1–2
Montana	Billings	Boulder Arrowhead	1–2
Nevada	Henderson	Paseo Verde	4–1
Utah	St. George	Dixie	2–1
Wyoming	Torrington	Torrington	0–2

Upper round 1
August 3 – Game 1
Montana	7
Nevada	1
Lower round 1
August 5 – Game 4
Nevada	24
Wyoming	4

Upper round 2
August 4 – Game 3 (F/5)
Colorado	18
Montana	7
August 4 – Game 2 (F/5)
Wyoming	5
Utah	19
Lower round 2
August 6 – Game 5
Montana	0
Nevada	6

Upper final
August 6 – Game 6 (F/4)
Colorado	2
Utah	16
Lower final
August 8 – Game 7
Colorado	0
Nevada	4

Final
August 9 – Championship
Utah	0
Nevada	2

=== New England ===
The tournament took place in Bristol, Connecticut from August 3–8.

State	City	LL Organization	Record
Maine	Portland	Portland	2–1
Massachusetts	Bridgewater	Bridgewater American	1–2
New Hampshire	Salem	Salem	3–1
Vermont	Burlington	Burlington American	0–2

August 3 – Game 1
Vermont	0
August 5 – Game 4
Massachusetts	9
Massachusetts	1
August 3 – Game 2
Maine	7
New Hampshire	0
August 8 – Championship
Maine	2
Maine	0
New Hampshire	2
August 7 – Game 5
Massachusetts	3
August 4 – Game 3
New Hampshire	4
Vermont	4
New Hampshire	6

=== Northwest ===
The tournament took place in San Bernardino, California from August 3–8.

State	City	LL Organization	Record
Alaska	Anchorage	Abbott-O-Rabbit	0–2
Idaho	Eagle	West Valley	2–1
Oregon	Bend	Bend North	1–2
Washington	Puyallup	South Hill	3–1

August 3 – Game 1
Idaho	6
August 5 – Game 4
Washington	4
Idaho	5
August 3 – Game 2
Oregon	3
Oregon	6
August 8 – Championship
Alaska	2
Idaho	7
Washington	13
August 7 – Game 5
Oregon	5
August 5 – Game 3
Washington	14
Washington	11
Alaska	4

=== Southeast ===
The tournament took place in Warner Robins, Georgia from August 1–6.

State	City	LL Organization	Record
Alabama	Rainbow City	Coosa	2–2
Florida	Lake Mary	Lake Mary	4–0
Georgia	Watkinsville	Oconee County American	3–2
North Carolina	Greenville	Greenville Tar Heel	1–2
South Carolina	Irmo	Irmo	0–2
Tennessee	Goodlettsville	Goodlettsville Baseball	3–2
Virginia	Chesterfield	Chesterfield	1–2
West Virginia	Hurricane	Hurricane	0–2

Upper round 1	Upper round 2	Upper final	Final
August 1 – Game 1
North Carolina	8
August 2 – Game 7
Georgia	5
North Carolina	4
August 1 – Game 2
Florida	11
Florida	5
August 4 – Game 12
South Carolina	3
Florida	8
August 1 – Game 3
Tennessee	1
Virginia	7
August 2 – Game 8 (F/7)
West Virginia	4
Virginia	2
August 1 – Game 4 (F/5)
Tennessee	11
Tennessee	19	August 6 – Championship (F/4)
Alabama	3	Florida	11
Tennessee	0
Lower round 1	Lower round 2	Lower round 3	Lower final
August 3 – Game 9 (F/3)
August 2 – Game 5	Virginia	0	August 5 – Game 13 (F/7)
Georgia	8	Georgia	18	August 4 – Game 11 (F/3)	Tennessee	11
South Carolina	6	Georgia	17	Georgia	6
August 3 – Game 10	Alabama	2
August 2 – Game 6	North Carolina	1
West Virginia	5	Alabama	4
Alabama	12

=== Southwest ===
The tournament took place in Waco, Texas from August 1–6.

State	City	LL Organization	Record
Arkansas	Little Rock	Junior Deputy Baseball	0–2
Louisiana	New Orleans	Greater New Orleans	3–2
Mississippi	Clinton	Clinton Baseball Association	0–2
New Mexico	Albuquerque	Roadrunner White	1–2
Oklahoma	Tulsa	Tulsa National	1–2
Texas East	Richmond	Lamar	3–2
Texas West	Boerne	Boerne	4–0

Upper round 1	Upper round 2	Upper final	Final
August 2 – Game 4
New Mexico	1
August 1 – Game 1
Texas West	5
Texas West	7
August 4 – Game 10
Arkansas	2
Texas West	4
August 1 – Game 2
Louisiana	1
Oklahoma	1
August 2 – Game 5
Louisiana	4
Louisiana	3
August 1 – Game 3
Texas East	0
Mississippi	0
August 6 – Championship
Texas East	4
Texas West	6
Louisiana	3
Lower round 1	Lower round 2	Lower round 3	Lower final
August 3 – Game 8 (F/7)
August 2 – Game 6 (F/4)	New Mexico	1	August 5 – Game 11
Oklahoma	10	Oklahoma	0	August 4 – Game 9 (F/8)	Louisiana	6
Mississippi	0	Texas East	3	Texas East	5
August 3 – Game 7	New Mexico	2
Arkansas	0
Texas East	3

=== West ===
The tournament took place in San Bernardino, California from August 4–9.

State	City	LL Organization	Record
Arizona	Litchfield Park	Litchfield Park	1–2
Hawaii	Wailuku	Central East Maui	3–1
Northern California	Sacramento	Land Park Pacific	0–2
Southern California	Eastvale	Eastvale	2–1

August 4 – Game 1
Northern California	0
August 6 – Game 4
Hawaii	2
Hawaii	3
August 4 – Game 2
Southern California	11
Arizona	0
August 9 – Championship
Southern California	4
Southern California	1
Hawaii	2
August 7 – Game 5
Hawaii	13
August 5 – Game 3
Arizona	9
Northern California	2
Arizona	3

== International ==
=== Asia-Pacific ===
The tournament took place in Hwaseong, South Korea from June 27–July 3.

Pool A
Country	Record
South Korea	4–0
Chinese Taipei^{1}	3–1
China	2–2
Indonesia	1–3
Thailand	0–4

Pool B
Country	Record
Philippines	3–0
Guam	2–1
Hong Kong	1–2
New Zealand	0–3

^{1} Republic of China, commonly known as Taiwan, due to complicated relations with People's Republic of China, is recognized by the name Chinese Taipei by majority of international organizations including Little League Baseball (LLB). For more information, please see Cross-Strait relations.

==== Knockout round ====
Semi-finals
June 25 – Hwaseong
1B Philippines	1
2A Chinese Taipei	16
June 25 – Hwaseong
1A South Korea	15
2B Guam	0

Asia-Pacific Championship
June 28 – Hwaseong
1A Chinese Taipei	3
1B South Korea	0

=== Australia ===
The tournament took place in Sydney from June 5–10.

==== Pool A ====
Pos	Team	Pld	W	L	RF	RA	RD	PCT	Qualification
1	(Western Australia) Perth Metro Central	5	3	2	38	14	+24	.600	Advance to semi-finals
2	(New South Wales) Hills	5	3	2	18	14	+4	.600	Advance to semi-finals
3	(New South Wales) Cronulla	5	3	2	25	19	+6	.600	
4	(Victoria (state)) Melbourne Athletics	5	3	2	26	30	−4	.600	
5	(South Australia) Adelaide Marlins	5	2	3	12	24	−12	.400	
6	(Queensland) Brisbane North	5	1	4	15	33	−18	.200	

Source: 2024 Australia Region Tournament

==== Pool B ====
Pos	Team	Pld	W	L	RF	RA	RD	PCT	Qualification
1	(South Australia) Adelaide Rays	5	4	1	50	6	+44	.800	Advance to semi-finals
2	(New South Wales) Ryde Red	5	4	1	55	22	+33	.800	Advance to semi-finals
3	(Western Australia) Perth Metro East	5	4	1	47	25	+22	.800	
4	(Australian Capital Territory) Canberra	5	1	4	31	33	−2	.200	
5	(Queensland) Brisbane Southwest	5	1	4	11	43	−32	.200	
6	(Victoria (state)) Melbourne Mariners	5	1	4	15	80	−65	.200	

Source: 2024 Australia Region Tournament

==== Bracket ====
Semi-finals
June 10 – Sydney
1A (Western Australia) Perth Metro Central	10
2B (New South Wales) Ryde Red	2
June 10 – Sydney
1B (South Australia) Adelaide Rays	2
2A (New South Wales) Hills	8

Australia Championship
June 10 – Sydney (F/4)
1A (Western Australia) Perth Metro Central	3
2A (New South Wales) Hills	16
Third place
June 10 – Sydney
2B (New South Wales) Ryde Red	11
1B (South Australia) Adelaide Rays	9

Fifth Place
June 10 – Sydney (F/7)
3A (New South Wales) Cronulla	5
3B (Western Australia) Perth Metro East	4

Seventh Place
June 10 – Sydney
4A (Victoria (state)) Melbourne Athletics	4
4B (Australian Capital Territory) Canberra	5

Ninth Place
June 10 – Sydney
5A (South Australia) Adelaide Marlins	4
5B (Queensland) Brisbane Southwest	1

Eleventh Place
June 10 – Sydney (F/4)
6A (Queensland) Brisbane North	12
6B (Victoria (state)) Melbourne Mariners	1

=== Canada ===
The tournament took place in Kingston, Ontario from July 30–August 8. The top four teams advanced to the semifinals.

Province	City	LL Organization	Record
Alberta	Medicine Hat	Medicine Hat	6–0
British Columbia	Surrey	Whalley	5–1
Ontario	Hamilton	Ancaster	4–2
Ontario (Host)	Kingston	Kingston	3–3
Saskatchewan	Regina	North Regina	2–4
Quebec	Mirabel	Diamond Baseball	1–5
Nova Scotia	Sydney Mines	Sydney Mines and District	0–6

==== Bracket ====
Semi-finals
August 7 – Kingston
1 Alberta	6
4 Ontario (Host)	0
August 7 – Kingston
2 British Columbia	5
3 Ontario	0

Canada Championship
August 8 – Kingston
1 Alberta	1
2 British Columbia	10
Third place
August 8 – Kingston
3 Ontario	7
4 Ontario (Host)	2

=== Caribbean ===
The tournament took place in Willemstad, Curaçao from July 15–20.

Pool A
Country	City	LL Organization	Record
Curaçao A	Willemstad	Pabao	4–0
Aruba	Santa Cruz	Aruba Central	2–2
Sint Maarten	Philipsburg	St. Maarten	0–4

Pool B
Country	City	LL Organization	Record
Curaçao B	Willemstad	Pariba	3–0
Dominican Republic	Santo Domingo Este	La Javilla	2–1
US Virgin Islands	St. Thomas	Elrod Hendricks West	1–2
Bonaire	Kralendijk	Bonaire	0–3

Semi-finals
July 19 – Willemstad
1A Curaçao A	1
2B Dominican Republic	8
July 19 – Willemstad
1B Curaçao B	8
2A Aruba	12

Caribbean Championship
July 20 – Willemstad
2B Dominican Republic	0
2A Aruba	2
Third place
July 20 – Willemstad
1A Curaçao A	6
1B Curaçao B	3

=== Cuba ===
As part of a rotational schedule also involving Panama and Puerto Rico, the winner of the Cuba Region gained direct entry into the tournament in 2024. The tournament took place in Bayamo, Cuba from February 10–March 3.

Round 1 (Feb 10–11)
San Antonio	1	6	–
Pinar del Río	2	7	–
Isla de la Juventud	5	2	2
Cerro	2	11	3
Quívican	3	3	–
Matanzas	4	9	–
Cienfuegos	4	0	–
Santa Clara	20	3	–
Moron	2	3	–
Sanctis Spiritus	10	7	–
Las Tunas	11	4	3
Camagüey	1	11	8
Holguin	3	2	–
Bayamo	10	15	–
Guantanamo	2	8	–
Santiago de Cuba	10	9	–

Round 2 (Feb 17–18)
Pinar del Río	3	4	–
Cerro	2	3	–
Matanzas	11	2	3
Santa Clara	3	10	5
Sanctis Spiritus	10	3	–
Camagüey	0	2	–
Bayamo	5	3	–
Santiago de Cuba	3	2	–

Round 3 (Feb 24–25)
Pinar del Río	4	1	–
Santa Clara	5	5	–
Sanctis Spiritus	7	1	–
Bayamo	4	0	–

Championship (Mar 2–3)
Santa Clara	7	2	–
Sanctis Spiritus	4	0	–

=== Europe and Africa ===
The tournament took place in Kutno, Poland from July 14–21.

==== Qualifier tournament ====
Teams
Country	City	LL Organization	Record
Israel	Beit Shemesh	South/Center	4–0
Croatia	Sisak	Croatia North	3–1
Lithuania	Vilnius	Vilnius	3–1
Estonia	Kiili	Estonia	2–2
Poland	Wrocław	KSB Wrocław	2–2
Poland	Gdańsk	Orly Gdańsk	0–4
Ukraine	Mykolaiv/Sumy	Mykolaiv/Sumy	0–4

First Place
July 10 – Kutno
1 Israel	13
4 Estonia	1

Second Place
July 10 – Kutno
2 Croatia	0
3 Lithuania	1

==== Regional tournament ====
Pool A
Country	City	LL Organization	Record
Czech Republic	Brno	South Czech Republic	3–0
Israel	Beit Shemesh	South/Center	2–1
France	Nice	Sud	1–2
South Africa	Cape Town	Western Cape Baseball	0–3

Pool C
Country	City	LL Organization	Record
Spain	Madrid	Madrid	3–1
United Kingdom	London	London	3–1
Netherlands	Rotterdam	Rotterdam	2–2
Switzerland	Zurich	Switzerland West/East	1–3
Ukraine	Kyiv/Rivne	Kyiv Baseball School/Rivne	1–3

Pool B
Country	City	LL Organization	Record
Germany	Munich	South-East Germany	3–0
Italy	Bologna	Emilia Romagna	2–1
Lithuania	Vilnius	Vilnius	1–2
Austria	Vienna	East Austria	0–3

First round
July 19 – Kutno
B2	Italy	2
C2	United Kingdom	0
July 19 – Kutno
C1	Spain	4
A2	Israel	7

Semifinals
July 20 – Kutno
A1	Czech Republic	4
B2	Italy	2
July 19 – Kutno
B1	Germany	12
A2	Israel	2

Final
July 21 – Kutno
A1	Czech Republic	4
B1	Germany	0

=== Japan ===
The tournament took place in Tokyo from July 19–22.

Pool A
Team	Prefecture	City	LL Organization	Record
Tokyo; Champions	Tokyo	Tokyo	Johoku	2–0
Higashikanto; Champions	Ibaraki	Ibaraki	Ibaraki	1–1
Kyushu; Champions	Fukuoka	Kitakyushu	Kyushu Hokubu	0–2

Pool C
Team	Prefecture	City	LL Organization	Record
Tokyo; Runner-Up	Tokyo	Tokyo	Joto	2–0
Kitakanto; Champions	Saitama	Kawaguchi	Saitama Higashi	1–1
Tōkai; Champions	Shizuoka	Hamamatsu	Shizuoka	0–2

Pool B
Team	Prefecture	City	LL Organization	Record
Kanagawa; Champions	Kanagawa	Yokohama	Yokohama	2–0
Tōhoku; Champions	Miyagi	Miyagi	Miyagi	1–1
Shikoku; Champions	Ehime	Iyo	Ehime Chuo	0–2

Pool D
Team	Prefecture	City	LL Organization	Record
Chūgoku; Champions	Hiroshima	Hiroshima	Hiroshima Aki	2–0
Kansai; Champions	Osaka	Ibaraki	Kansai Hokubu	1–1
Shin'etsu; Champions	Nagano	Ōmachi	Alps	0–2

Semi-finals
July 21 – Tokyo
1A (Tokyo) Johoku	13
1B (Kanagawa Prefecture) Yokohama	0
July 21 – Tokyo
1C (Tokyo) Joto	7
1D (Hiroshima Prefecture) Hiroshima Aki	6

Japan Championship
July 21 – Tokyo
1A (Tokyo) Johoku	5
1C (Tokyo) Joto	1

=== Latin America ===
The tournament took place in Panama City, Panama from July 20–27.

Pool A
Country	City	LL Organization	Record
Nicaragua	Chinandega	Amigos For Christ	4–1
Panama A	Los Santos	Las Tablas	4–1
Colombia	Cartagena	Falcón	3–2
Brazil		Cantareira	3–2
Ecuador	Guayaquil	LEBS	1–4
El Salvador	Soyapango	FESA	0–5

Pool B
Country	City	LL Organization	Record
Venezuela	Barquisimeto	Cardenales	5–0
Guatemala		Liga Pequeña Javier de Baseball	4–1
Panama B	Juan Díaz	Tomas Muñoz	3–2
Honduras	San Pedro Sula	Liga Marinera	2–3
Costa Rica		Santo Domingo de Heredia	1–4
Chile	Santiago	Santiago Oriente	0–5

Semi-finals
July 26 – Panama City
1A Nicaragua	9
2B Guatemala	1
July 26 – Panama City
1B Venezuela	5
2A Panama A	0

Latin America Championship
July 27 – Panama City
1A Nicaragua	0
1B Venezuela	10

=== Mexico ===
The tournament took place in Monterrey, Nuevo León from June 29–July 5.

Pool A
State	City	LL Organization	Record
Chihuahua	Chihuahua	Swing Perfecto de Chihuahua	4–1
Baja California	Tijuana	Municipal de Tijuana	3–2
Nayarit	Tepic	Kora	3–2
Nuevo León	San Nicolás	San Nicolás	3–2
Tamaulipas	Nuevo Laredo	Oriente	2–3
Durango	Lerdo	CD Lerdo Durango	0–5

Pool B
State	City	LL Organization	Record
Tamaulipas	Matamoros	Matamoros	4–1
Baja California	Mexicali	Seguro Social	3–2
San Luis Potosí	Villa de La Paz	Ing. José Cerrillo	3–2
Veracruz	Cotaxtla	Cotaxtla	2–3
Jalisco	Jalostotitlán	Jalostotitlán	2–3
Nuevo León	San Pedro	Sierra Madre	1–4

Semi-finals
July 4 – Monterrey
1A (Chihuahua (state)) Swing Perfecto de Chihuahua	6
2B (Baja California) Seguro Social	1
July 4 – Monterrey
1B (Tamaulipas) Matamoros	3
2A (Baja California) Municipal de Tijuana	0

Mexico Championship
July 5 – Monterrey
1A (Chihuahua (state)) Swing Perfecto de Chihuahua	4
1B (Tamaulipas) Matamoros	5

=== Puerto Rico ===
As part of a rotational schedule also involving Cuba and Panama, the winner of the Puerto Rico Region will gain direct entry into the tournament in 2024. The tournament took place in Bayamón, Puerto Rico from May 18–June 16.

==== Bracket A ====
Upper round 1	Upper round 2	Upper round 3	Upper final	Final
May 18 – Game 1A
Hermanos Cruz	17
May 25 – Game 11A
Torrimar	2
Hermanos Cruz	0
May 19 – Game 5A
Jamie Collazo	5
May 18 – Game 2A	Valle Arriba	1
May 26 – Game 15A
Arecibo	1	Jamie Collazo	8
Jamie Collazo	9
Valle Arriba	2	May 19 – Game 6A
Barceloneta	8
May 18 – Game 3A	Cataño	0
May 25 – Game 12A
Castellana Gardens	10	Barceloneta	10
Barceloneta	4
Cataño	12	May 18 – Game 4A
Academia Castro Sports	0
Academia Castro Sports	5	June 8 – Game 18A Pool A Championship
Roosevelt	3	Jamie Collazo	7
Hermanos Cruz	2
Lower round 1	Lower round 2	Lower round 3	Lower round 4	Lower final
May 26 – Game 14A
May 25 – Game 9A	Valle Arriba	7	June 2 – Game 17A
May 19 – Game 7A	Valle Arriba	3	Academia Castro Sports	3	June 1 – Game 16A	Barceloneta	12
Torrimar	5	Torrimar	2	Valle Arriba	5	Hermanos Cruz	14
Castellana Gardens	3	May 26 – Game 13A	Hermanos Cruz	7
May 25 – Game 10A	Roosevelt	7
May 19 – Game 8A	Roosevelt	10	Hermanos Cruz	8
Arecibo	3	Cataño	1
Roosevelt	9

==== Bracket B ====
Upper round 1	Upper round 2	Upper round 3	Upper final	Final
May 18 – Game 1B
Venezuela	0
May 19 – Game 5B
Cayey	6
Cayey	7
May 18 – Game 2B
Miguel Luzunaris	10
Miguel Luzunaris	10
May 26 – Game 11B
Buenaventura Baseball Club	0
Miguel Luzunaris	4
May 19 – Game 6B
Radames Lopez	5
May 18 – Game 3B	Corozal	0
May 25 – Game 8B
Colinas de Fair View	1	Radames Lopez	11
Radames Lopez	2
Radames Lopez	32	May 18 – Game 4B
Toa Baja	1
Juan A Bibiloni	3	June 8 – Game 16B Pool B Championship
Toa Baja	8	Radames Lopez	1
Cayey	0
Lower round 1	Lower round 2	Lower round 3	Lower round 4	Lower final
May 26 – Game 12B
May 25 – Game 9B	Buenaventura Baseball Club	10	June 2 – Game 15B
May 19 – Game 7B	Buenaventura Baseball Club	15	Toa Baja	7	June 1 – Game 14B	Miguel Luzunaris	1
Venezuela	9	Colinas de Fair View	0	Buenaventura Baseball Club	3	Cayey	2
Colinas de Fair View	10	May 26 – Game 13B	Cayey	13
May 25 – Game 10B	Cayey	7
Corozal	12	Juan A Bibiloni	3
Juan A Bibiloni	13

==== Championship Series ====
Puerto Rico Championship; June 15
Jamie Collazo	2	2	–
Radames Lopez	3	4	–
