= Little League World Series (New England Region) =

Children's baseball tournament

New England Region
- Most recent season or competition: 2026 Little League World Series qualification
- Formerly: East Region (1957–2000)
- Sport: Baseball
- Founded: 2001; 25 years ago
- No. of teams: 4
- Country: United States
- Most recent champions: Bridgewater Joe Lazaro Little League, Bridgewater, Massachusetts
- Most titles: Rhode Island (8) Fairfield American Little League, Fairfield, Connecticut (3)
- Website: Little League Baseball & Softball Eastern Region Headquarters

The New England Region is one of ten United States regions that currently send teams to the Little League World Series, the largest youth baseball competition in the world. The region's participation in the Little League World Series dates back to 1957, when it was known as the East Region. However, in 2001, the East Region was split into the New England Region and the Mid-Atlantic Region.

Regional headquarters are located in Bristol, Connecticut.

The New England Region consists of four New England states:

- Maine
- Massachusetts
- New Hampshire
- Vermont

Following the 2021 LLWS, Connecticut and Rhode Island were moved to a newly created Metro Region. The latter region is one of the two new U.S. regions to be created as part of a planned expansion of the LLWS from 16 to 20 teams. This expansion was originally scheduled to occur for 2021, but was delayed to 2022 due to the COVID-19 pandemic.

== Regional championship ==
The year's winner is indicated in green.

=== 2001–2021 ===
Year	Connecticut	Maine	Massachusetts	New Hampshire	Rhode Island	Vermont
2001	Yalesville LL; Wallingford	Lincoln County LL; Damariscotta	Pittsfield South LL; Pittsfield	Manchester East LL; Manchester	Lincoln LL; Lincoln	South Burlington LL; South Burlington
2002	Orange LL; Orange	Westbrook LL; Westbrook	Jesse Burkett LL; Worcester	Portsmouth LL; Portsmouth	Portsmouth LL; Portsmouth	Essex Junction LL; Essex Junction
2003	North Stamford LL; Stamford	Augusta West LL; Augusta	Saugus American LL; Saugus	Rye LL; Rye	Lincoln LL; Lincoln	South Burlington LL; South Burlington
2004	Berlin LL; Berlin	East Biddeford LL; Biddeford	Jesse Burkett LL; Worcester	Portsmouth LL; Portsmouth	Lincoln LL; Lincoln	Essex Junction LL; Essex Junction
2005	Farmington LL; Farmington	Westbrook LL; Westbrook	Dudley LL; Dudley	Bedford LL; Bedford	Cranston Western LL; Cranston	Shelburne LL; Shelburne
2006	Glastonbury American LL; Glastonbury	Yarmouth LL; Yarmouth	Peabody Western LL; Peabody	Portsmouth LL; Portsmouth	Lincoln LL; Lincoln	Colchester LL; Colchester
2007	Shelton National LL; Shelton	Portland North LL; Portland	Walpole American LL; Walpole	Portsmouth LL; Portsmouth	Cranston Western LL; Cranston	Essex Junction LL; Essex Junction
2008	Shelton National LL; Shelton	Camden-Rockport LL; Camden	Parkway National LL; West Roxbury	Manchester North LL; Manchester	Cranston Western LL; Cranston	Williston LL; Williston
2009	Glastonbury National LL; Glastonbury	Bangor East LL; Bangor	Peabody Western LL; Peabody	Portsmouth LL; Portsmouth	Lincoln LL; Lincoln	Brattleboro LL; Brattleboro
2010	Fairfield American LL; Fairfield	Bangor East LL; Bangor	Southborough Youth Baseball LL; Southborough	Portsmouth LL; Portsmouth	Cumberland National LL; Cumberland	Shelburne LL; Shelburne
2011	Fairfield American LL; Fairfield	Yarmouth LL; Yarmouth	Andover National LL; Andover	Goffstown Junior Baseball LL; Goffstown	Cumberland American LL; Cumberland	Barre Community LL; Barre
2012	Fairfield American LL; Fairfield	Scarborough LL; Scarborough	Wellesley South LL; Wellesley	Bedford LL; Bedford	Coventry American LL; Coventry	South Burlington LL; South Burlington
2013	Westport LL; Westport	Saco/Maremont LL; Saco	Newton SouthEast LL; Newton	Rye LL; Rye	Lincoln LL; Lincoln	South Burlington LL; South Burlington
2014	Fairfield American LL; Fairfield	Falmouth LL; Falmouth	Tom Wallace Barnstable American LL; Barnstable	Goffstown LL; Goffstown	Cumberland American LL; Cumberland	Williston LL; Williston
2015	Waterford LL; Waterford	Biddeford LL; Biddeford	Newton SouthEast LL; Newton	Bedford LL; Bedford	Cranston Western LL; Cranston	South Burlington LL; South Burlington
2016	Fairfield American LL; Fairfield	Scarborough LL; Scarborough	Wellesley South LL; Wellesley	Bedford LL; Bedford	Warwick North LL; Warwick	Brattleboro LL; Brattleboro
2017	Fairfield American LL; Fairfield	South Portland American LL; South Portland	Holden LL; Holden	Goffstown Junior Baseball LL; Goffstown	Cumberland American LL; Cumberland	Essex Junction LL; Essex Junction
2018	Fairfield American LL; Fairfield	Saco/Maremont LL; Saco	Pittsfield American LL; Pittsfield	Goffstown Junior Baseball LL; Goffstown	Coventry LL; Coventry	South Burlington LL; South Burlington
2019	Madison LL; Madison	Lewiston LL; Lewiston	Walpole LL; Walpole	Goffstown Junior Baseball LL; Goffstown	Barrington LL; Barrington	Connecticut Valley North LL; Bradford
2020	Not held due to the COVID-19 pandemic					
2021	Manchester LL; Manchester	Saco/Dayton LL; Saco	Peabody West LL; Peabody	North Manchester–Hooksett LL; Hooksett	North Providence LL; North Providence	Essex Town LL; Essex

=== 2022–present ===
Year	Maine	Massachusetts	New Hampshire	Vermont
2022	Bangor East LL; Bangor	Middleboro LL; Middleborough	Concord LL; Concord	Brattleboro LL; Brattleboro
2023	Gray New Gloucester LL; Gray	Canton LL; Canton	Salem LL; Salem	St. Johnsbury LL; St. Johnsbury
2024	Portland LL; Portland	Bridgewater American LL; Bridgewater	Salem LL; Salem	Burlington American LL; Burlington
2025	Machias Area LL; Machias	Braintree American LL; Braintree	Bedford LL; Bedford	Essex Town LL; Essex
2026	Gray New Gloucester LL; Gray	Bridgewater Joe Lazaro LL; Bridgewater	Portsmouth LL; Portsmouth	Camels Hump LL; Richmond

== LLWS results ==
As of the 2026 Little League World Series.

Year	Champion	City	LLWS	Record
2001	Lincoln LL	(Rhode Island) Lincoln	Group Stage	0–3
2002	Jesse Burkett LL	(Massachusetts) Worcester	4th Place	3–3
2003	American LL	(Massachusetts) Saugus	4th Place	4–2
2004	Lincoln LL	(Rhode Island) Lincoln	Group Stage	1–2
2005	Westbrook LL	(Maine) Westbrook	Group Stage	1–2
2006	Portsmouth LL	(New Hampshire) Portsmouth	U.S. Semifinal	2–2
2007	Walpole American LL	(Massachusetts) Walpole	Group Stage	1–2
2008	Shelton National LL	(Connecticut) Shelton	Group Stage	1–2
2009	Peabody Western LL	(Massachusetts) Peabody	Group Stage	1–2
2010	Fairfield American LL	(Connecticut) Fairfield	Group Stage	1–2
2011	Cumberland American LL	(Rhode Island) Cumberland	Round 1	1–2
2012	Fairfield American LL	(Connecticut) Fairfield	Round 3	2–2
2013	Westport LL	(Connecticut) Westport	4th Place	3–3
2014	Cumberland American LL	(Rhode Island) Cumberland	Round 2	1–2
2015	Cranston Western LL	(Rhode Island) Cranston	Round 2	1–2
2016	Warwick North LL	(Rhode Island) Warwick	Round 2	1–2
2017	Fairfield American LL	(Connecticut) Fairfield	U.S. Semifinal	3–2
2018	Coventry LL	(Rhode Island) Coventry	Round 1	1–2
2019	Barrington LL	(Rhode Island) Barrington	Round 2	1–2
2020	LLWS not held due to the COVID-19 pandemic			
2021 (Note: Due to the COVID-19 pandemic, Little League International did not invite teams from outside the U.S. to the LLWS in 2021. Instead, the top two teams in each U.S. region qualified.)	North Manchester–Hooksett LL	(New Hampshire) Hooksett	Round 3	2–2
2021	Manchester LL	(Connecticut) Manchester	Round 1	0–2
2022	Middleboro LL	(Massachusetts) Middleborough	Round 1	0–2
2023	Gray New Gloucester LL	(Maine) Gray	Round 1	0–2
2024	Salem LL	(New Hampshire) Salem	Round 1	0–2
2025	Braintree American LL	(Massachusetts) Braintree	Round 2	1–2
2026	Bridgewater Joe Lazaro LL	(Massachusetts) Bridgewater	Round 1	0–2

=== Results by state ===
As of the 2026 Little League World Series. Italics indicates the state is no longer a member of the New England Region.

State	New England Championships	LLWS Championships	Record in LLWS	PCT
Rhode Island	8	0	7–17	.292
Massachusetts	7	0	10–15	.400
Connecticut	5	0	10–13	.435
New Hampshire	3	0	4–6	.400
Maine	2	0	1–4	.200
Vermont	0	0	0–0	–
Total	25	0	32–55	.368

== See also ==
- Little League World Series (East Region)
- Little League World Series (Mid-Atlantic Region)

East Region in other Little League divisions

- Intermediate League
- Junior League
- Senior League
- Big League
