= Little League World Series (Southwest Region) =

Children's baseball tournament

Southwest Region
- Most recent season or competition: 2026 Little League World Series qualification
- Formerly: South Region (1957–2000); Gulf States Region (2001)
- Sport: Baseball
- Founded: 2002; 24 years ago
- No. of teams: 7
- Country: United States
- Most recent champions: Boerne Little League, Boerne, Texas
- Most titles: Texas East (10) Pearland Little League, Pearland, Texas (4)
- Website: Little League Baseball Southwest Region

The Southwest Region is one of ten United States regions that currently send teams to the Little League World Series, the largest youth baseball competition in the world. The region's participation in the LLWS dates back to 1957, when it was known as the South Region. However, when the LLWS was expanded in 2001 from eight teams (four U.S. teams and four "International" teams from the rest of the world) to 16 teams (eight U.S. and eight International), the Southern Region was split into the Southeast and Southwest Regions.

Regional headquarters are located in Waco, Texas.

The Southwest Region is made up of seven districts in six states.

- Arkansas
- Louisiana
- Mississippi
- New Mexico
- Oklahoma
- Texas (Split into two districts, "East" and "West")

== Regional championship in the Gulf States ==
In 2001, the region was briefly called the Gulf States region. Alabama and Tennessee competed in this region before joining the Southeast Region the following year. The table below lists the participants in the 2001 tournament, with the winner indicated in green.

| Year | Alabama | Arkansas | Louisiana | Mississippi | Oklahoma | Tennessee | Texas |
|---|---|---|---|---|---|---|---|
| 2001 | Huntsville National LL; Huntsville | Benton National LL; Benton | South Lake Charles LL; Lake Charles | Biloxi National LL; Biloxi | Grove Sports LL; Grove | Donelson American LL; Hermitage | ORWALL American LL; The Woodlands |

== Regional championship in the Southwest ==
=== 2002–2023 ===
In 2002, the region was renamed the Southwest Region. Colorado and New Mexico joined the region to replace Alabama and Tennessee. Additionally, Texas was split into two districts, giving the Southwest region eight teams. The list below lists each state's participant in the Southwest Little League Region Tournament. That year's winner is indicated in green.

| Year | Arkansas | Colorado | Louisiana | Mississippi | New Mexico | Oklahoma | Texas East | Texas West |
|---|---|---|---|---|---|---|---|---|
| 2002 | Benton National LL; Benton | North Boulder LL; Boulder | South Lake Charles LL; Lake Charles | Ocean Springs LL; Ocean Springs | Noon Optimist LL; Roswell | Tulsa National LL; Tulsa | First Colony American LL; Sugar Land | Fort Worth Westside LL; Fort Worth |
| 2003 | Bryant Athletic LL; Bryant | Academy LL; Colorado Springs | South Lake Charles LL; Lake Charles | P.Y.A.A. LL; Picayune | Artesia LL; Artesia | Tulsa National LL; Tulsa | Lamar National LL; Richmond | Jim Parker LL; Odessa |
| 2004 | Bryant Athletic LL; Bryant | Academy LL; Colorado Springs | South Lake Charles LL; Lake Charles | Ocean Springs LL; Ocean Springs | Shorthorn LL; Carlsbad | John Hess LL; Tulsa | Lamar National LL; Richmond | McAllister Park American LL; San Antonio |
| 2005 | Bryant Athletic LL; Bryant | Academy LL; Colorado Springs | Lafayette LL; Lafayette | Biloxi LL; Biloxi | Eastdale LL; Albuquerque | Tulsa National LL; Tulsa | Washington County LL; Brenham | Del Mar LL; Laredo |
| 2006 | Mountain Home LL; Mountain Home | Academy LL; Colorado Springs | South Lake Charles LL; Lake Charles | D'Iberville LL; D'Iberville | Shorthorn LL; Carlsbad | Northeast Oklahoma LL; Ottawa County | Groves National LL; Groves | Lubbock Western LL; Lubbock |
| 2007 | Benton LL; Benton | Monument LL; Grand Junction | Lafayette LL; Lafayette | Ocean Springs LL; Ocean Springs | Noon Optimist LL; Roswell | Tulsa National LL; Tulsa | Tomball LL; Tomball | Lubbock Western LL; Lubbock |
| 2008 | White Hall LL; White Hall | Grand Mesa LL; Grand Junction | South Lake Charles LL; Lake Charles | Ocean Springs LL; Ocean Springs | Eastdale LL; Albuquerque | Tulsa National LL; Tulsa | Lamar American LL; Richmond | Lubbock Southwest LL; Lubbock |
| 2009 | White Hall National LL; White Hall | Grand Mesa LL; Grand Junction | South Lake Charles LL; Lake Charles | Biloxi LL; Biloxi | Eastdale LL; Albuquerque | Tulsa American LL; Tulsa | Bridge City LL; Bridge City | McAllister Park American LL; San Antonio |
| 2010 | Arkadelphia LL; Arkadelphia | Orchard Mesa LL; Grand Junction | Lincoln Parish LL; Ruston | Ocean Springs LL; Ocean Springs | Altamont LL; Albuquerque | Tulsa American LL; Tulsa | Pearland White LL; Pearland | Eagle Pass American LL; Eagle Pass |
| 2011 | White Hall LL; White Hall | North Boulder LL; Boulder | Lafayette LL; Lafayette | Ocean Springs LL; Ocean Springs | Altamont LL; Albuquerque | Pittsburg County LL; McAlester | Pearland Maroon LL; Pearland | North Midland LL; Midland |
| 2012 | White Hall LL; White Hall | Monument LL; Grand Junction | South Lake Charles LL; Lake Charles | D'Iberville LL; D'Iberville | Petroglyph LL; Albuquerque | Northeast Oklahoma LL; Fairland | Lufkin LL; Lufkin | McAllister Park National LL; San Antonio |
| 2013 | Malvern LL; Malvern | North Boulder LL; Boulder | Bossier National LL; Bossier City | Ocean Springs LL; Ocean Springs | Fairacres LL; Las Cruces | Tulsa LL; Tulsa | Pearland Maroon LL; Pearland | Universal LL; Corpus Christi |
| 2014 | Pine Bluff Western LL; Pine Bluff | North Boulder LL; Boulder | South Lake Charles LL; Lake Charles | Biloxi LL; Biloxi | Eastdale LL; Albuquerque | Pittsburg County LL; McAlester | Pearland East LL; Pearland | Northside Suburban LL; San Antonio |
| 2015 | Pine Bluff Western LL; Pine Bluff | North Boulder LL; Boulder | Eastbank LL; Jefferson Parish | Starkville LL; Starkville | Paradise Hills LL; Albuquerque | Tulsa National LL; Tulsa | Pearland West LL; Pearland | McAllister Park National LL; San Antonio |
| 2016 | Bryant LL; Bryant | North Boulder LL; Boulder | South Lake Charles LL; Lake Charles | Starkville LL; Starkville | Eastdale LL; Albuquerque | Tulsa National LL; Tulsa | Pearland East LL; Pearland | McAllister Park American LL; San Antonio |
| 2017 | White Hall LL; White Hall | Academy LL; Colorado Springs | Eastbank LL; River Ridge | Starkville LL; Starkville | Eastdale LL; Albuquerque | Tulsa National LL; Tulsa | Lufkin LL; Lufkin | McAllister Park National LL; San Antonio |
| 2018 | White Hall LL; White Hall | Academy LL; Colorado Springs | South Lake Charles LL; Lake Charles | Franklin County LL; Meadville | Shorthorn LL; Carlsbad | Tulsa National LL; Tulsa | Post Oak LL; Houston | East Brownsville LL; Brownsville |
| 2019 | White Hall LL; White Hall | Colorado River Valley LL; Rifle | Eastbank LL; River Ridge | Starkville LL; Starkville | Shorthorn LL; Carlsbad | Tulsa National LL; Tulsa | Post Oak LL; Houston | Midland Northern LL; Midland |
| 2020 | Not held due to COVID-19 pandemic | | | | | | | |
| 2021 | Junior Deputy Baseball LL; Little Rock | North Boulder LL; Boulder | Lafayette LL; Lafayette | Starkville LL; Starkville | Sunset LL; Rio Rancho | Tulsa National LL; Tulsa | Needville LL; Needville | Wylie LL; Abilene |
| 2022 | White Hall LL; White Hall | Three Rivers LL; Glenwood Springs | Eastbank LL; Kenner | Starkville LL; Starkville | Eastdale LL; Albuquerque | Tulsa National LL; Tulsa | Pearland LL; Pearland | Wylie LL; Abilene |
| 2023 | Junior Deputy Baseball LL; Little Rock | Three Rivers LL; Glenwood Springs | Ascension Parish LL; Gonzales | Starkville LL; Starkville | Roadrunner LL; Albuquerque | Tulsa National LL; Tulsa | Needville LL; Needville | Midland Northern LL; Midland |

=== 2024–present ===
In December of 2023 it was announced that Colorado would be moved to the Mountain Region for 2024 and beyond, leaving the Southwest Region with 7 teams.

| Year | Arkansas | Louisiana | Mississippi | New Mexico | Oklahoma | Texas East | Texas West |
|---|---|---|---|---|---|---|---|
| 2024 | Junior Deputy Baseball LL; Little Rock | Greater New Orleans LL; New Orleans | Clinton Baseball Association LL; Clinton | Roadrunner White LL; Albuquerque | Tulsa National LL; Tulsa | Lamar LL; Richmond | Boerne LL; Boerne |
| 2025 | Junior Deputy Baseball LL; Little Rock | Eastbank LL; Kenner | Starkville LL; Starkville | Eastdale LL; Albuquerque | Tulsa National LL; Tulsa | Lamar LL; Richmond | Midway LL; Hewitt |
| 2026 | Junior Deputy Baseball LL; Little Rock | Ascension Parish LL; Gonzales | Clinton Baseball Association LL; Clinton | Eastdale LL; Albuquerque | Tulsa National LL; Tulsa | Lamar LL; Richmond | Boerne LL; Boerne |

== LLWS results ==
As of the 2026 Little League World Series.

| Year | Champion | City | LLWS | Record |
|---|---|---|---|---|
| 2001 | South Lake Charles LL | (Louisiana) Lake Charles | Group Stage | 1–2 |
| 2002 | Westside LL | (Texas) Fort Worth | U.S. Semifinal | 2–2 |
| 2003 | Lamar National LL | (Texas) Richmond | U.S. Semifinal | 2–2 |
| 2004 | Lamar National LL | (Texas) Richmond | 3rd place | 5–1 |
| 2005 | Lafayette LL | (Louisiana) Lafayette | U.S. Semifinal | 2–2 |
| 2006 | South Lake Charles LL | (Louisiana) Lake Charles | Group Stage | 1–2 |
| 2007 | Lubbock Western LL | (Texas) Lubbock | 3rd Place | 4–1 |
| 2008 | South Lake Charles LL | (Louisiana) Lake Charles | 4th Place | 3–3 |
| 2009 | McAllister Park American LL | (Texas) San Antonio | 4th Place | 4–2 |
| 2010 | Pearland White LL | (Texas) Pearland | 4th Place | 3–3 |
| 2011 | Lafayette LL | (Louisiana) Lafayette | Round 2 | 1–2 |
| 2012 | McAllister Park National LL | (Texas) San Antonio | U.S. Semifinal | 2–2 |
| 2013 | Universal LL | (Texas) Corpus Christi | Round 1 | 1–2 |
| 2014 | Pearland East LL | (Texas) Pearland | Round 3 | 2–2 |
| 2015 | Pearland West LL | (Texas) Pearland | 3rd Place | 4–2 |
| 2016 | McAllister Park American LL | (Texas) San Antonio | Round 1 | 0–3 |
| 2017 | Lufkin LL | (Texas) Lufkin | Runner-Up | 4–2 |
| 2018 | Post Oak LL | (Texas) Houston | Round 2 | 1–2 |
| 2019 | Eastbank LL | (Louisiana) River Ridge | Champions | 6–1 |
| 2020 | LLWS not held due to COVID-19 pandemic | | | |
| 2021 (Note: Due to the COVID-19 pandemic, Little League International did not invite teams from outside the U.S. to the LLWS in 2021. Instead, the top two teams in each U.S. region qualified.) | Lafayette LL | (Louisiana) Lafayette | Round 2 | 1–2 |
| 2021 | Wylie LL | (Texas) Abilene | Round 4 | 3–2 |
| 2022 | Pearland LL | (Texas) Pearland | U.S. Semifinal | 3–2 |
| 2023 | Needville LL | (Texas) Needville | 4th place | 4–2 |
| 2024 | Boerne LL | (Texas) Boerne | 4th place | 3–2 |
| 2025 | Lamar LL | (Texas) Richmond | Round 1 | 0–2 |
| 2026 | Boerne LL | (Texas) Boerne | Round 2 | 0–2 |

=== Results by state ===
As of the 2026 Little League World Series. Italics denote the state is no longer a member of the Southwest Region.

| State | Southwest Championships | LLWS Championships | Record in LLWS | PCT |
|---|---|---|---|---|
| Texas East | 10 | 0 | 28–20 | .583 |
| Texas West | 8 | 0 | 19–18 | .514 |
| Louisiana | 7 | 1 | 15–14 | .517 |
| Arkansas | 0 | 0 | 0–0 | – |
| Colorado | 0 | 0 | 0–0 | – |
| Mississippi | 0 | 0 | 0–0 | – |
| New Mexico | 0 | 0 | 0–0 | – |
| Oklahoma | 0 | 0 | 0–0 | – |
| Total | 25 | 1 | 62–52 | .544 |

== See also ==
- Little League World Series (South Region)
- Little League World Series (Southeast Region)

South Region in other Little League divisions

- Intermediate League
- Junior League
- Senior League
- Big League
