= 2026 Little League World Series =

Baseball tournament for children aged 10 to 12 years old

Tournament details
- Dates: August 19–August 30
- Teams: 20

Final positions
- Champions: Pariba Little League, Willemstad, Curaçao
- Runners-up: (United States) Paseo Verde Little League, Henderson, Nevada

The 2026 Little League World Series was a youth baseball tournament that took place from August 19 to August 30 at the Little League headquarters complex in South Williamsport, Pennsylvania. Ten teams from the United States and ten teams from other countries competed in the 79th edition of the Little League World Series (LLWS). Pariba Little League from Willemstad, Curaçao defeated Paseo Verde Little League from Henderson, Nevada by a score of 11–2 to win the country's second LLWS title.

== Teams ==
Regional qualifying tournaments were held from March to August 2026. On January 20, 2026, it was announced that the Curaçao and Panama regional winners would receive direct entry into the tournament.

United States		International	
Region	Team	Region	Team
Great Lakes	(Ohio) Hamilton, Ohio; West Side Little League	Asia-Pacific and Middle East	(South Korea) Seoul, South Korea; West Seoul (B) Little League
Metro	(New Jersey) Bayonne, New Jersey; Bayonne Central Little League	Australia	(Australia) (New South Wales) Sydney, New South Wales; Ryde Little League
Mid-Atlantic	West Chester, Pennsylvania; East Side Little League	Canada	(Canada) (British Columbia) Vancouver, British Columbia; Little Mountain Little League
Midwest	Davenport, Iowa; Davenport Northwest Little League	Caribbean	(Dominican Republic) Santiago, Dominican Republic; Los Nacionales Little League
Mountain	(Nevada) Henderson, Nevada; Paseo Verde Little League	Curaçao	(Curaçao) Willemstad; Pariba Little League
New England	(Massachusetts) Bridgewater, Massachusetts; Bridgewater Joe Lazaro Little League	Europe and Africa	Brno, Czech Republic; South Czech Republic Little League
Northwest	(Washington (state)) Tacoma, Washington; Soundview Little League	Japan	(Japan) Tokyo; Joto Little League
Southeast	(Alabama) Phenix City, Alabama; Phenix City Youth Baseball Little League	Latin America	León, Nicaragua; Ministerio Sobre Las Alas Del Aguila Little League
Southwest	(Texas) Boerne, Texas; Boerne Little League	Mexico	(Mexico) Tijuana, Baja California; Municipal de Tijuana Little League
West	(California) Bonita, California; Sweetwater Valley Little League	Panama	(Panama) David, Chiriquí; David Doleguita Little League

== Results ==
The draw to determine the opening round pairings took place on June 10, 2026.

=== United States bracket ===
Upper round 1	Upper round 2	Upper round 3	Upper final	Final
August 21 – Game 10
August 19 – Game 2 (F/7)	Texas	3
August 23 – Game 17
(Washington (state)) Washington	2	Washington	4
Washington	0
Alabama	0	August 21 – Game 6
Nevada	5
Ohio	5
August 26 – Game 30
Nevada	6
Nevada	14
August 21 – Game 12
Iowa	6
August 19 – Game 4	Pennsylvania	1
August 23 – Game 19
Massachusetts	1	New Jersey	3
New Jersey	0
New Jersey	2	August 21 – Game 8
Iowa	6
California	0	August 29 – U.S. Championship (F/5)
Iowa	1	Nevada	12
Ohio	2
Lower round 1	Lower round 2	Lower round 3	Lower round 4	Lower final
August 25 – Game 28
August 24 – Game 22	New Jersey	2	August 27 – Game 34
August 22 – Game 14 (F/4)	Texas	1	Ohio	5	August 26 – Game 32	Iowa	1
Massachusetts	0	Ohio	6	Ohio	11	Ohio	7
Ohio	10	August 25 – Game 26	Alabama	2
August 24 – Game 24 (F/7)	Washington	2
August 22 – Game 16 (F/4)	Pennsylvania	5	Alabama	4
Alabama	12	Alabama	6
California	2

=== International bracket ===
Upper round 1	Upper round 2	Upper round 3	Upper final	Final
August 21 – Game 9
August 19 – Game 1	Panama	4
August 23 – Game 18
Nicaragua	2	Nicaragua	6
Nicaragua	8
Dominican Republic	1	August 21 – Game 5
Mexico	4
Australia	1
August 26 – Game 29
Mexico	7
Nicaragua	3
August 21 – Game 11
Curaçao	12
August 19 – Game 3	(Czech Republic) Czechia	0
August 23 – Game 20
Canada	0	South Korea	5
South Korea	0
South Korea	7	August 21 – Game 7
Curaçao	1
Curaçao	6	August 29 – Int'l Championship
Japan	0	Curaçao	4
Japan	0
Lower round 1	Lower round 2	Lower round 3	Lower round 4	Lower final
August 25 – Game 27
August 24 – Game 21 (F/7)	South Korea	1	August 27 – Game 33
August 22 – Game 13	Panama	2	Canada	5	August 26 – Game 31	Nicaragua	1
Canada	4	Canada	3	Canada	3	Japan	4
Australia	0	August 25 – Game 25	Japan	7
August 24 – Game 23	Mexico	1
August 22 – Game 15	(Czech Republic) Czechia	2	Japan	3
Japan	10	Japan	3
Dominican Republic	1

Third place game
Ohio	2
Japan	3

Championship game
Curaçao	11
Nevada	2

2026 Little League World Series Champions
Pariba Little League
Willemstad, Curaçao

== Champions path ==
The Pariba LL reached the LLWS with a record of 5–4. In total, their record is 10–4.

Round	Opposition	Result
Curaçao Regional Tournament First Round
Game 2	Pabao LL	3–4
Game 3	Willemstad LL	10–1
Game 4	Pabao LL	2–4
Curaçao Regional Tournament Best-of-seven Championship Series
Game 1	Pabao LL	0–10
Game 2	Pabao LL	3–2
Game 3	Pabao LL	5–1
Game 4	Pabao LL	2–4
Game 5	Pabao LL	6–2
Game 6	Pabao LL	5–2

== MLB Little League Classic ==
On November 19, 2025, it was announced that the ninth MLB Little League Classic would feature the Atlanta Braves and the Milwaukee Brewers on August 23. The Braves defeated the Brewers, 4–2.
