= 2016 Little League World Series qualification =

Children's baseball competition qualification

United States
- Great Lakes winner: Bowling Green, Kentucky
- Mid-Atlantic winner: (New York (state)) Maine-Endwell, New York
- Midwest winner: Johnston, Iowa
- New England winner: Warwick, Rhode Island
- Northwest winner: Bend, Oregon
- Southeast winner: Goodlettsville, Tennessee
- Southwest winner: San Antonio, Texas
- West winner: Chula Vista, California

International
- Asia-Pacific and Middle East winner: Seoul, South Korea
- Australia winner: (Australia) Sydney, New South Wales
- Canada winner: (Canada) Vancouver, British Columbia
- Caribbean winner: Willemstad, Curaçao
- Europe and Africa winner: Emilia, Italy
- Japan winner: (Japan) Tokyo
- Latin America winner: Aguadulce, Panama
- Mexico winner: (Mexico) San Nicolás de los Garza, Nuevo Leon

Tournaments

Qualification for the 2016 Little League World Series took place in eight United States regions and eight international regions from June through August 2016.

== United States ==
=== Great Lakes ===
The tournament began August 7 in Indianapolis, Indiana. Due to inclement weather during the championship game on August 13 and an unfavorable forecast in the following days, the championship game, in which play was suspended in the top of the second inning, was completed at Howard J. Lamade Stadium in South Williamsport, Pennsylvania on August 15.

State	City	LL Organization	Record
Illinois	Streator	Streator	0–2
Indiana	Terre Haute	Terre Haute North	0–2
Kentucky	Bowling Green	Bowling Green Eastern	3–0
Michigan	Essexville	Essexville-Hampton	3–2
Ohio	Hamilton	West Side	2–2
Wisconsin	Kenosha	Kenosha American	2–2

August 8 – Game 3
Indiana	9
August 7 – Game 1
Wisconsin	11
Wisconsin	4
August 10 – Game 7
Illinois	2
Wisconsin	6
August 7 – Game 2
Kentucky	11
Michigan	8
August 8 – Game 4 (F/4)
Ohio	15
Kentucky	11
Ohio	1
August 15 – Championship
Kentucky	7
August 9 – Game 5 (F/4)
Michigan	2
Illinois	3
August 11 – Game 8
Ohio	19
Ohio	0
August 9 – Game 6 (F/4)
Michigan	1
Michigan	15
August 12 – Game 9
Indiana	2
Wisconsin	7
Michigan	9

=== Mid-Atlantic ===
The tournament took place in Bristol, Connecticut from August 7–13.

State	City	LL Organization	Record
Delaware	Milton	Milton	1–2
Maryland	Hughesville	Hughesville	0–2
New Jersey	Freehold Township	Freehold Township	0–2
New York	Maine-Endwell	Maine-Endwell	4–0
Pennsylvania	Clinton County	Keystone	4–2
Washington, D.C.		Capitol City	1–2

August 8 – Game 3
Washington, D.C.	7
August 7 – Game 1
Pennsylvania	2
Maryland	7
August 10 – Game 7
Pennsylvania	10
Washington, D.C.	2
August 7 – Game 2
New York	8
New Jersey	6
August 8 – Game 4
New York	8
Delaware	0
New York	1
August 13 – Championship
New York	6
August 9 – Game 5 (F/7)
Pennsylvania	2
Maryland	2
August 11 – Game 8
Delaware	5
Delaware	5
August 9 – Game 6
Pennsylvania	9
New Jersey	1
August 12 – Game 9
Pennsylvania	5
Washington, D.C.	3
Pennsylvania	11

=== Midwest ===
The tournament took place in Indianapolis, Indiana from August 7–13.

Note: North Dakota and South Dakota are organized into a single Little League district.

State	City	LL Organization	Record
Iowa	Johnston	Johnston	3–0
Kansas	Frontenac	Frontenac Youth	4–2
Minnesota	Coon Rapids	Coon Rapids Andover American	2–2
Missouri	Webb City	Webb City	0–2
Nebraska	Kearney	Kearney	1–2
South Dakota	Rapid City	Canyon Lake	0–2

August 8 – Game 3
Iowa	9
August 7 – Game 1
Minnesota	0
Minnesota	4
August 10 – Game 7
South Dakota	3
Iowa	7
August 7 – Game 2
Nebraska	1
Kansas	10
August 8 – Game 4
Missouri	6
Nebraska	6
Kansas	0
August 13 – Championship
Iowa	3
August 9 – Game 5
Kansas	0
South Dakota	7
August 11 – Game 8
Kansas	15
Kansas	6
August 9 – Game 6
Minnesota	3
Missouri	2
August 12 – Game 9
Minnesota	9
Nebraska	2
Kansas	5

=== New England ===
The tournament took place in Bristol, Connecticut from August 7–13.

State	City	LL Organization	Record
Connecticut	Fairfield	Fairfield American	3–2
Maine	Scarborough	Scarborough	1–2
Massachusetts	Wellesley	Wellesley South	1–2
New Hampshire	Bedford	Bedford	2–2
Rhode Island	Warwick	Warwick North	3–0
Vermont	Brattleboro	Brattleboro	0–2

August 8 – Game 3
Rhode Island	5
August 7 – Game 1
Maine	2
Maine	8
August 10 – Game 7
Vermont	4
Rhode Island	10
August 7 – Game 2
Massachusetts	7
New Hampshire	7
August 8 – Game 4 (F/5)
Connecticut	1
Massachusetts	10
New Hampshire	0
August 13 – Championship
Rhode Island	5
August 9 – Game 5 (F/5)
Connecticut	1
Vermont	4
August 11 – Game 8
New Hampshire	14
New Hampshire	11
August 9 – Game 6
Connecticut	17
Connecticut	8
August 12 – Game 9 (F/5)
Maine	2
Massachusetts	0
Connecticut	11

=== Northwest ===
The tournament took place in San Bernardino, California from August 7–13.

State	City	LL Organization	Record
Alaska	Anchorage	Abbott-O-Rabbit	0–2
Idaho	Boise	North Boise	1–2
Montana	Missoula	Mount Sentinel	2–2
Oregon	Bend	Bend North	4–1
Washington	Lynnwood	Lynnwood Pacific	3–1
Wyoming	Laramie	Laramie	0–2

August 8 – Game 3
Idaho	13
August 7 – Game 1
Montana	9
Montana	10
August 11 – Game 8
Alaska	2
Idaho	7
August 7 – Game 2 (F/4)
Washington	18
Wyoming	1
August 8 – Game 4
Washington	15
Oregon	2
Washington	8
August 13 – Championship
Washington	1
August 9 – Game 5
Oregon	5
Alaska	2
August 10 – Game 7
Oregon	6
Oregon	15
August 9 – Game 6
Montana	0
Wyoming	3
August 12 – Game 9
Montana	6
Idaho	0
Oregon	12

=== Southeast ===
The tournament took place in Warner Robins, Georgia from August 5–10.

State	City	LL Organization	Record
Alabama	Huntsville	Huntsville American	0–2
Florida	North Palm Beach	North Palm Beach County	2–2
Georgia	Peachtree City	Peachtree City American	4–2
North Carolina	Durham	Bull City	1–2
South Carolina	Irmo	Irmo	1–2
Tennessee	Goodlettsville	Goodlettsville Baseball	4–0
Virginia	Vienna	Vienna American	0–2
West Virginia	Bridgeport	Bridgeport	2–2

August 5 – Game 1
West Virginia	3
August 6 – Game 7
North Carolina	1
West Virginia	7
August 5 – Game 2
Florida	3
Alabama	7
August 8 – Game 11
Florida	9
West Virginia	4
August 5 – Game 3 (F/5)
Tennessee	5
Georgia	14
August 6 – Game 8
Virginia	1
Georgia	3
August 5 – Game 4 (F/7)
Tennessee	6
Tennessee	5
South Carolina	3
August 10 – Championship (F/4)
Tennessee	15
August 6 – Game 5 (F/4)
Georgia	3
North Carolina	19
August 7 – Game 9
Alabama	0
Georgia	4
North Carolina	2
August 8 – Game 12
Georgia	5
August 6 – Game 6
Florida	1
Virginia	8
August 7 – Game 10
South Carolina	12
Florida	5
South Carolina	4
August 9 – Game 13 (F/4)
West Virginia	3
Georgia	13

=== Southwest ===
The tournament took place in Waco, Texas from August 4–10.

State	City	LL Organization	Record
Arkansas	Bryant	Bryant	1–2
Colorado	Boulder	North Boulder	1–2
Louisiana	Lake Charles	South Lake Charles	3–2
Mississippi	Starkville	Starkville	2–2
New Mexico	Albuquerque	Eastdale	3–1
Oklahoma	Tulsa	Tulsa National	0–2
Texas East	Pearland	Pearland East	0–2
Texas West	San Antonio	McAllister Park American	4–1

August 4 – Game 1
Louisiana	0
August 6 – Game 7 (F/4)
Texas West	3
Texas West	14
August 4 – Game 2
Arkansas	0
Texas East	2
August 8 – Game 11
Arkansas	4
Texas West	6
August 4 – Game 3
New Mexico	9
New Mexico	3
August 6 – Game 8
Mississippi	1
New Mexico	6
August 4 – Game 4
Colorado	5
Colorado	9
Oklahoma	7
August 10 – Championship
New Mexico	3
August 5 – Game 5
Texas West	13
Louisiana	8
August 7 – Game 9
Texas East	1
Arkansas	3
Louisiana	16
August 8 – Game 12
Louisiana	2
August 5 – Game 6 (F/4)
Mississippi	1
Mississippi	10
August 7 – Game 10 (F/5)
Oklahoma	0
Colorado	6
Mississippi	16
August 9 – Game 13
Louisiana	4
Texas West	8

=== West ===
The tournament took place in San Bernardino, California from August 7–13.

State	City	LL Organization	Record
Arizona	Cave Creek	Cactus Foothills South	0–2
Hawaii	Wailuku	Central East Maui	2–2
Nevada	Las Vegas	Mountain Ridge	3–2
Northern California	Vacaville	Vacaville Central	0–2
Southern California	Chula Vista	Park View	4–0
Utah	Santa Clara	Snow Canyon	1–2

August 8 – Game 3
Utah	2
August 7 – Game 1
Hawaii	5
Hawaii	8
August 11 – Game 8
Nevada	0
Hawaii	11
August 7 – Game 2 (F/10)
Southern California	14
Northern California	3
August 8 – Game 4
Southern California	18
Arizona	4
Southern California	7
August 13 – Championship
Southern California	1
August 9 – Game 5 (F/5)
Nevada	0
Nevada	15
August 10 – Game 7 (F/4)
Arizona	4
Nevada	15
August 9 – Game 6
Utah	4
Northern California	6
August 12 – Game 9
Utah	7
Hawaii	0
Nevada	9

== International ==
=== Asia-Pacific and Middle East ===
The tournament took place in Seoul, South Korea from June 25–July 1.

Pool A
Country	Record
South Korea	5–0
Philippines	4–1
Guam	2–3
Northern Mariana Islands	2–3
United Arab Emirates	2–3
India	0–5

Pool B
Country	Record
Chinese Taipei^{1}	4–0
Thailand	3–1
Hong Kong	2–2
China	1–3
Saudi Arabia	0–4

^{1} Republic of China, commonly known as Taiwan, due to complicated relations with People's Republic of China, is recognized by the name Chinese Taipei by majority of international organizations including Little League Baseball (LLB). For more information, please see Cross-Strait relations.

Semi-finals
June 30 – Seoul
2B Thailand	0
1A South Korea	2
June 30 – Seoul (F/5)
2A Philippines	1
1B Chinese Taipei	12

Asia-Pacific and Middle East Championship
July 1 – Seoul
1A South Korea	7
1B Chinese Taipei	6

=== Australia ===
The tournament took place in Lismore, New South Wales from June 8–13. The top two teams in each pool advance to the elimination round, where they are seeded one through eight based on overall record.

Pool A
State/Territory	LL Organization	Record
New South Wales	Manly ^{(5)}	3–1
South Australia	Adelaide Rays ^{(7)}	3–1
Western Australia	Perth Metro North	3–1
Queensland	Brisbane North	1–1
Victoria	Northern Diamondbacks	0–3

Pool C
State/Territory	LL Organization	Record
New South Wales	Hills ^{(1)}	4–0
Western Australia	Perth Metro Central ^{(8)}	3–1
Victoria	Southern Mariners	2–2
Queensland	Gold Coast Pirates	1–3
Western Australia	Coastal Bay	0–4

Pool B
State/Territory	LL Organization	Record
New South Wales	Macarthur ^{(3)}	4–0
New South Wales	Central Coast ^{(6)}	3–1
Victoria	Eastern Athletics	2–2
Queensland	Brisbane Metro	1–3
Western Australia	Perth Metro East	0–4

Pool D
State/Territory	LL Organization	Record
Western Australia	Swan Hills ^{(2)}	4–0
New South Wales	Ryde North ^{(4)}	3–1
South Australia	Adelaide Seahawks	2–2
Australian Capital Territory	Canberra	1–3
Victoria	Geelong	0–4

Quarter-finals
June 11 – Lismore (F/4)
1 (New South Wales) Hills	11
8 (Western Australia) Perth Metro Central	1
June 11 – Lismore
4 (New South Wales) Ryde North	3
5 (New South Wales) Manly	1
June 11 – Lismore
3 (New South Wales) Macarthur	7
6 (New South Wales) Central Coast	9
June 11 – Lismore
2 (Western Australia) Swan Hills	3
7 (South Australia) Adelaide Rays	4

Semi-finals
June 12 – Lismore
1 (New South Wales) Hills	2
4 (New South Wales) Ryde North	0
June 12 – Lismore
6 (New South Wales) Central Coast	6
7 (South Australia) Adelaide Rays	4

Australia Championship
June 13 – Lismore
1 (New South Wales) Hills	7
6 (New South Wales) Central Coast	3

=== Canada ===
The tournament took place in Vancouver, British Columbia from August 4–13. The following teams have qualified to compete in the tournament.

Pos	Team	Pld	W	L	RF	RA	RD	PCT	Qualification	(British Columbia) (H)	(British Columbia)	(Quebec)	(Alberta)	(Ontario)	(Saskatchewan)	(Nova Scotia)
1	(British Columbia) Hastings Community (H)	6	6	0	63	9	+54	1.000	Advance to Semifinals	—	5–4	14–4	12–1	10–0	10–0	12–0
2	(British Columbia) Whalley	6	5	1	56	8	+48	.833	Advance to Semifinals	4–5	—	5–0	13–1	4–2	10–0	20–0
3	(Quebec) Diamond Baseball Academy	6	4	2	57	34	+23	.667	Advance to Semifinals	4–14	0–5	—	12–2	18–10	14–3	9–0
4	(Alberta) Lethbridge Southwest	6	3	3	37	44	−7	.500	Advance to Semifinals	1–12	1–13	2–12	—	11–5	12–2	10–0
5	(Ontario) Port Arthur National	6	2	4	35	49	−14	.333		0–10	2–4	10–18	5–11	—	10–1	8–5
6	(Saskatchewan) Moose Jaw	6	1	5	17	64	−47	.167		0–10	0–10	3–14	2–12	1–10	—	11–8
7	(Nova Scotia) Sydney and District #1	6	0	6	13	70	−57	.000		0–12	0–20	0–9	0–10	5–8	8–11	—

(H) Hosts

Semifinals
3	(Quebec) Diamond Baseball Academy	4
2	(British Columbia) Whalley	8
4	(Alberta) Lethbridge Southwest	0
1	(British Columbia) Hastings Community	9

Canada Championship
2	(British Columbia) Whalley	0
1	(British Columbia) Hastings Community	1

=== Caribbean ===
The tournament took place in Saint Croix, U.S. Virgin Islands from July 16–23.

Pool A
Nation	City	Organization	Record
Curaçao	Willemstad	Pariba	4–0
U.S. Virgin Islands (A)	St. Thomas	Alvin McBean East	2–2
Bonaire	Kralendijk	Bonaire	0–4

Pool B
Nation	City	Organization	Record
Dominican Republic	Santo Domingo	La Javilla	2–1
Aruba	Santa Cruz	Aruba Center	2–1
Puerto Rico	Carolina	Roberto Clemente	2–1
U.S. Virgin Islands (B)	St. Croix	Elmo Plaskett East	0–3

Semi-finals
July 22 – St. Croix
2B Aruba	0
1A Curaçao	1
July 22 – St. Croix
2A (United States Virgin Islands) U.S. Virgin Islands (A)	2
1B Dominican Republic	1

Final
July 23 – St. Croix
1A Curaçao	5
2A (United States Virgin Islands) U.S. Virgin Islands (A)	0

=== Europe and Africa ===
The tournament took place in Kutno, Poland from July 15–23. The format of the tournament was a modified double elimination.

Teams
Country	City	LL Organization	Record
Austria	Vienna	Austria East	0–2
Belarus	Brest	Brest Zubrs	0–2
Belgium	Antwerp	Flanders East	1–2
Croatia	Zagreb	Croatia North	1–2
Czech Republic	Brno	South Czech Republic	4–1
France	Paris	Ile-de-France 2	2–2
(United States) Germany-US	Ramstein	KMC American	0–2
Hungary	Budapest/Érd	Central/Eastern	2–2
Italy	Emilia	Emilia	5–1
Lithuania	Kaunas	Kaunas	1–2
Netherlands	Haarlem	Kennemerland	3–2
Spain	Barcelona	Catalunya	3–2
United Kingdom	London	London Youth Baseball	1–2
Ukraine	Kirovograd	Kirovograd Center	2–2

Results
July 15
Game	Team 1	Score	Team 2
1	Austria (0–1)	2–16	Croatia (1–0)
2	Czech Republic (1–0)	5–4	(United States) Germany-USA (0–1)
3	Spain (1–0)	10–0	Lithuania (0–1)
4	Ukraine (1–0)	7–0	Belarus (0–1)
July 16
Game	Team 1	Score	Team 2
5	France (1–0)	11–1	United Kingdom (0–1)
6	Belgium (0–1)	0–20	Italy (1–0)
7	Netherlands (1–0)	11–0	Croatia (1–1)
8	Czech Republic (2–0)	10–9	Spain (1–1)
July 17
Game	Team 1	Score	Team 2
9	Ukraine (1–1)	0–5	France (2–0)
10	Hungary (0–1)	3–14	Italy (2–0)
11	Belarus (0–2)	0–8	United Kingdom (1–1)
12	(United States) Germany-USA (0–2)	2–5	Lithuania (1–1)
July 18
Game	Team 1	Score	Team 2
13	Belgium (1–1)	5–4	Croatia (1–2)
14	Austria (0–2)	5–10	Hungary (1–1)
15	United Kingdom (1–2)	0–5	Spain (2–1)
16	Lithuania (1–2)	1–8	Ukraine (2–1)
July 19
Game	Team 1	Score	Team 2
17	Netherlands (2–0)	2–13	Czech Republic (3–0)
18	France (2–1)	1–5	Italy (3–0)
19	Belgium (1–2)	4–10	Spain (3–1)
20	Hungary (2–1)	9–4	Ukraine (2–2)
July 20
Game	Team 1	Score	Team 2
21	Spain (4–1)	6–3	France (2–2)
22	Hungary (2–2)	2–13	Netherlands (2–1)
23	Czech Republic (4–0)	4–3	Italy (3–1)
July 21
Game	Team 1	Score	Team 2
24	Spain (4–2)	10–17	Netherlands(3–1)
July 22
Game	Team 1	Score	Team 2
25	Netherlands (3–2)	0–10	Italy (4–1)
July 23
Game	Team 1	Score	Team 2
26	Czech Republic (4–1)	1–5	Italy (5–1)

=== Japan ===
The tournament took place in Ueda, Nagano from July 30–31.

Participating teams	Prefecture	City	LL Organization
Chūgoku Champions	Okayama	Okayama	Okayama
Higashikanto Champions	Ibaraki	Ushiku	Ushiku
Kyushu Champions	Nagasaki	Nagasaki	Nagasaki Minami
Hokkaido Champions	Hokkaido	Sapporo	Sapporo Shiroishi
Kanagawa Champions	Kanagawa	Yokohama	Asahi
Kansai Champions	Hyogo	Takarazuka	Takarazuka
Kansai Runner-Up	Osaka	Osaka	Osaka Namihaya
Kitakanto Champions	Saitama	Ōmiya City	Ōmiya Higashi
Shikoku Champions	Ehime	Niihama	Niihama
Shin'etsu Champions	Nagano	Iida	Iida
Tōhoku Champions	Miyagi	Sendai	Sendai Higashi
Tōhoku Runner-Up	Aomori	Aomori	Aomori Hirosaki
Tōkai Champions	Aichi	Toyota	Toyota
Tōkai Runner-Up	Shizuoka	Hamamatsu	Hamamatsu Minami
Tokyo Champions	Tokyo	Tokyo	Tokyo Nakano
Tokyo Runner-Up	Tokyo	Tokyo	Chofu

Opening Round
July 30 – Ueda
(Ibaraki Prefecture) Ushiku	1
Tokyo Nakano	8
July 30 – Ueda
(Ehime Prefecture) Niihama	3
(Osaka Prefecture) Osaka Namihaya	7
July 30 – Ueda
(Miyagi Prefecture) Sendai Higashi	12
(Hokkaido) Sapporo Shiroishi	1
July 30 – Ueda
(Shizuoka Prefecture) Hamamatsu Minami	12
(Kanagawa Prefecture) Asahi	3
July 30 – Ueda
(Okayama Prefecture) Okayama	12
(Tokyo) Chofu	15
July 30 – Ueda
(Aomori Prefecture) Aomori Hirosaki	1
(Aichi Prefecture) Toyota	3
July 30 – Ueda
(Saitama Prefecture) Ōmiya Higashi	6
(Hyōgo Prefecture) Takarazuka	12
July 30 – Ueda
(Nagasaki Prefecture) Nagasaki Minami	5
(Nagano Prefecture) Iida	0

Quarterfinals
July 30 – Ueda
Tokyo Nakano	3
(Osaka Prefecture) Osaka Namihaya	2
July 30 – Ueda
(Miyagi Prefecture) Sendai Higashi	9
(Shizuoka Prefecture) Hamamatsu Minami	3
July 30 – Ueda
(Tokyo) Chofu	11
(Aichi Prefecture) Toyota	3
July 30 – Ueda
(Hyōgo Prefecture) Takarazuka	6
(Nagasaki Prefecture) Nagasaki Minami	16

Semifinals
July 31 – Ueda
Tokyo Nakano	5
(Miyagi Prefecture) Sendai Higashi	7
July 31 – Ueda
(Tokyo) Chofu	11
(Nagasaki Prefecture) Nagasaki Minami	1

Championship
July 31 – Ueda
(Miyagi Prefecture) Sendai Higashi	10
(Tokyo) Chofu	20

=== Latin America ===
The tournament took place in Guatemala City, Guatemala from July 23–30.

Pool A
Country	City	LL Organization	Record
Nicaragua	Rivas	Rivas	3–0
Venezuela	Maracaibo	Luz Maracaibo	2–1
Guatemala (A)	Guatemala City	Javier	1–2
Colombia	Cartagena	Falcon	0–3

Pool B
Country	City	LL Organization	Record
Panama	Aguadulce	Aguadulce Cabezera	3–0
El Salvador	San Salvador	Agabeisi	2–1
Honduras	San Pedro Sula	Marinera	1–2
Guatemala (B)	Guatemala City	Liga Pequeña de Béisbol de Guatemala	0–3

Semi-finals
July 29 – Guatemala City
2B El Salvador	4
1A Nicaragua	5
July 29 – Guatemala City
2A Venezuela	0
1B Panama	2

Final
July 30 – Guatemala City
1A Nicaragua	1
1B Panama	6

=== Mexico ===
The tournament took place in Monterrey, Nuevo León from July 9–15.

Pool A
State	LL Organization	Record
Sonora	Norte de Hermosillo	6–0
Nuevo León	San Nicolás	5–1
Tamaulipas	Oriente	4–2
Veracruz	Poza Rica Municipal	3–3
Coahuila	Juvenil de Sabinas	2–4
Chihuahua	Cura Trillo	1–5
Jalisco	Jalostotitlan	0–6

Pool B
State	LL Organization	Record
Nuevo León	Guadalupe Linda Vista	6–0
Baja California	Félix Arce	5–1
Tamaulipas	Guadalupe Treviño Kelly	4–2
Veracruz	Infantil y Juvenil Veracruzana	3–3
Coahuila	Ribereña	2–4
Jalisco	SUTAJ Alfarera	1–5
Chihuahua	El Granjero	0–6

Semi-finals
July 14 – Monterrey
2B (Baja California) Felix Arce	4
1A (Sonora) Norte de Hermosillo	6
July 14 – Monterrey
2A (Nuevo León) San Nicolas	5
1B (Nuevo León) Guadalupe Linda Vista	3

Mexico Championship
July 15 – Monterrey
1A (Sonora) Norte de Hermosillo	5
2A (Nuevo León) San Nicolas	6
