= 2014 Little League World Series qualification =

Children's baseball competition qualification

United States
- Great Lakes winner: New Albany, Indiana
- Mid-Atlantic winner: Philadelphia, Pennsylvania
- Midwest winner: Rapid City, South Dakota
- New England winner: Cumberland, Rhode Island
- Northwest winner: (Washington (state)) Lynnwood, Washington
- Southeast winner: Nashville, Tennessee
- Southwest winner: Pearland, Texas
- West winner: Las Vegas, Nevada

International
- Asia-Pacific and Middle East winner: Seoul, South Korea
- Australia winner: Perth, Western Australia
- Canada winner: (Canada) Vancouver, British Columbia
- Caribbean winner: Humacao, Puerto Rico
- Europe and Africa winner: Brno, Czech Republic
- Japan winner: (Japan) Tokyo
- Latin America winner: Maracaibo, Venezuela
- Mexico winner: (Mexico) Guadalupe, Nuevo León

Tournaments

Qualification for the 2014 Little League World Series took place in eight United States regions and eight international regions from June through August 10, 2014.

== United States ==
=== Great Lakes ===
The tournament took place in Indianapolis, Indiana from August 2–9.

State	City	LL Organization	Record
Illinois	Chicago	Jackie Robinson West	0-4*
Indiana	New Albany	New Albany	3–1
Wisconsin	Burlington	Burlington	2–2
Ohio	Canfield	Canfield	2–2
Michigan	Midland	Midland Northeast	1–3
Kentucky	Bowling Green	Warren County Southern	0–4

Semi-finals
August 7 – Indianapolis (F/4)
4 Ohio	6
1 Illinois	0*
August 7 – Indianapolis (F/4)
3 Wisconsin	4
2 Indiana	14

Final
August 9 – Indianapolis
1 Illinois	0*
2 Indiana	6

*On February 15, 2015, Jackie Robinson West Little League was forced to forfeit all its matches due to rules violations for fielding ineligible players - they are officially recorded as 6-0 victories for the opposing team. The Great Lakes Championship was retroactively awarded to the Indiana representative New Albany Little League.

=== Mid-Atlantic ===
The tournament took place in Bristol, Connecticut from August 1–10.

State	City	LL Organization	Record
New Jersey	Toms River	Toms River	4–0
Pennsylvania	Philadelphia	Taney Youth Baseball Association	3–1
New York	Colonie	Colonie	2–2
Delaware	Newark	Newark National	2–2
Maryland	Salisbury	West Salisbury	1–3
Washington, D.C.		Northwest Washington	0–4

Semi-finals
August 8 – Bristol
4 Delaware	4
1 New Jersey	3
August 8 – Bristol
3 New York	5
2 Pennsylvania	6

Final
August 10 – Bristol
4 Delaware	0
2 Pennsylvania	8

=== Midwest ===
The tournament took place in Indianapolis, Indiana from August 1–8.

Note: North Dakota and South Dakota are organized into a single Little League district.

State	City	LL Organization	Record
Minnesota	Plymouth	Plymouth/New Hope	4–0
South Dakota	Rapid City	Canyon Lake	4–0
Missouri	Joplin	Joplin South	1–3
Nebraska	Kearney	Kearney	1–3
Iowa	Sioux City	Headid	1–3
Kansas	Frontenac	Frontenac Youth	1–3

Semi-finals
August 6 – Indianapolis
4 Nebraska	11
1 Minnesota	7
August 6 – Indianapolis
3 Missouri	3
2 South Dakota	7

Final
August 8 – Indianapolis (F/4)
4 Nebraska	4
2 South Dakota	15

=== New England ===
The tournament took place in Bristol, Connecticut from August 1–9.

State	City	LL Organization	Record
Connecticut	Fairfield	Fairfield American	3–1
Rhode Island	Cumberland	Cumberland American	3–1
Maine	Falmouth	Falmouth	2–2
Massachusetts	Barnstable	Tom Wallace Barnstable American	2–2
New Hampshire	Goffstown	Goffstown Junior Baseball	1–3
Vermont	Williston	Williston	1–3

Semi-finals
August 7 – Bristol
4 Massachusetts	0
1 Connecticut	9
August 7 – Bristol (F/8)
3 Maine	4
2 Rhode Island	13

Final
August 9 – Bristol
1 Connecticut	6
2 Rhode Island	10

=== Northwest ===
The tournament took place in San Bernardino, California from August 1–9.

State	City	LL Organization	Record
Washington	Lynnwood	Lynnwood Pacific	4–0
Oregon	Bend	Bend North	3–1
Alaska	Eagle River	Knik	3–1
Montana	Billings	Boulder Arrowhead	1–3
Idaho	Lewiston	Lewiston	1–3
Wyoming	Cody	Cody	0–4

Semi-finals
August 7 – San Bernardino
4 Montana	3
1 Washington	10
August 7 – San Bernardino
3 Alaska	6
2 Oregon	7

Final
August 9 – San Bernardino
1 Washington	6
2 Oregon	3

=== Southeast ===
The tournament took place in Warner Robins, Georgia from August 2–8.

Pool A
State	City	LL Organization	Record
Florida	Brandon	South Brandon	2–1
Georgia^{[a]}	Columbus	Columbus Northern	2–1
North Carolina	Clemmons	Southwest Forsyth	2–1
West Virginia	Bridgeport	Bridgeport	0–3

Pool B
State	City	LL Organization	Record
Virginia	Henrico	Tuckahoe American	2–1
Tennessee	Nashville	South Nashville	2–1
Alabama	Jackson	Jackson	1–2
South Carolina	Taylors	Northwood	1–2

- ^{a} Peachtree City National Little League of Peachtree City, Georgia won the Georgia state tournament by defeating Columbus Northern. However, Peachtree City was stripped of their title by virtue of having twelve players on the team whose league age was 12-years old. Little League regulations state that the maximum number for a team is eight.

Semi-finals
August 6 – Warner Robins (F/4)
2B Tennessee	13
1A Florida	1
August 6 – Warner Robins
2A Georgia	7
1B Virginia	8

Final
August 8 – Warner Robins
2B Tennessee	9
1B Virginia	4

=== Southwest ===
The tournament took place in Waco, Texas from August 1–6.

Pool A
State	City	LL Organization	Record
New Mexico	Albuquerque	Eastdale	3–0
Mississippi	Biloxi	Biloxi	2–1
Colorado	Boulder	North Boulder	1–2
Arkansas	Pine Bluff	Pine Bluff Western	0–3

Pool B
State	City	LL Organization	Record
Texas East	Pearland	Pearland East	3–0
Louisiana	Lake Charles	South Lake Charles	2–1
Texas West	San Antonio	Northside Suburban	1–2
Oklahoma	McAlester	Pittsburg County	0–3

Semi-finals
August 5 – Waco (F/7)
2B Louisiana	10
1A New Mexico	9
August 5 – Waco
2A Mississippi	6
1B Texas East	12

Final
August 6 – Waco
2B Louisiana	3
1B Texas East	7

=== West ===
The tournament took place in San Bernardino, California from August 1–9.

State	City	LL Organization	Record
Hawaii	Honolulu	Honolulu	4–0
Nevada	Las Vegas	Mountain Ridge	4–0
Southern California	Encinitas	Encinitas	2–2
Northern California	Pacifica	Pacifica American	1–3
Arizona	Chandler	Chandler National North	1–3
Utah	St. George	Dixie	0–4

Semi-finals
August 8 – San Bernardino
4 Northern California	1
1 Hawaii	0
August 8 – San Bernardino
3 Southern California	1
2 Nevada	5

Final
August 9 – San Bernardino
4 Northern California	2
2 Nevada	11

== International ==
=== Asia-Pacific and Middle East ===
The tournament took place in Clark, Philippines from June 29–July 5.

Pool A
Country	City	LL Organization	Record
Hong Kong			4–1
Chinese Taipei (Taiwan)^{1}			3–2
Saudi Arabia	Dhahran	Arabian American	3–2
Northern Mariana Islands			3–2
United Arab Emirates	Dubai	Dubai	2–3
Vietnam	Hanoi	Hanoi	0–5

Pool B
Country	City	LL Organization	Record
South Korea	Seoul	Seoul	4–0
Philippines			3–1
Guam			2–2
Indonesia	Jakarta	Jakarta	1–3
New Zealand			0–4

Semi-finals
July 4 – Philippines
2B Philippines	9
1A Hong Kong	10
July 4 – Philippines
2A Chinese Taipei	2
1B South Korea	9

Final
July 5 – Philippines
1A Hong Kong	0
1B South Korea	11

^{1} Republic of China, commonly known as Taiwan, due to complicated relations with People's Republic of China, is recognized by the name Chinese Taipei by majority of international organizations including Little League Baseball (LLB). For more information, please see Cross-Strait relations.

=== Australia ===
The tournament took place in Gold Coast, Queensland on June 4–9. The top two teams in each pool advance to the elimination round, where they are seeded one through eight based on overall record. The "runs against ratio" (RAR) is used as the tiebreaker. It is calculated by the number of runs scored against a team, divided by the number of defensive innings the team played.

Pool A
State/Territory	LL Organization	Record
New South Wales	Manly	3–1
Western Australia	Perth Metro North	3–1
Queensland	Brisbane South	2–2
Western Australia	West Coast	2–2
Australian Capital Territory	Canberra	0–4

Pool C
State/Territory	LL Organization	Record
Queensland	Brisbane Metro	3–1
Western Australia	Perth Metro East	3–1
New South Wales	Ryde North	2–2
Victoria	Sunraysia	1–3
South Australia	Adelaide Southern Districts	1–3

Pool B
State/Territory	LL Organization	Record
Western Australia	Perth Metro Central	4–0
New South Wales	MacArthur	2–2
New South Wales	Hills North	2–2
Queensland	Brisbane North	2–2
Victoria	Yarra Rangers	0–4

Pool D
State/Territory	LL Organization	Record
Western Australia	Swan Hills	4–0
New South Wales	Cronulla North	3–1
South Australia	Adelaide Southern Districts	2–2
Queensland	Gold Coast	1–3
Victoria	Northern Diamondbacks	0–4

Quarter-finals
June 7 – Gold Coast
(Western Australia) Swan Hills	7
(New South Wales) MacArthur	5
June 7 – Gold Coast
(New South Wales) Manly	6
(Queensland) Brisbane Metro	0
June 7 – Gold Coast
(Western Australia) Perth Metro Central	4
(Western Australia) Perth Metro East	2
June 7 – Gold Coast
(Western Australia) Perth Metro North	4
(New South Wales) Cronulla North	2

Semi-finals
June 8 – Gold Coast (F/7)
(Western Australia) Swan Hills	6
(New South Wales) Manly	7
June 8 – Gold Coast
(Western Australia) Perth Metro Central	3
(Western Australia) Perth Metro North	4

Final
June 9 – Gold Coast (F/7)
(New South Wales) Manly	2
(Western Australia) Perth Metro North	3

=== Canada ===
The tournament took place in Salaberry-de-Valleyfield, Quebec from August 1–10.

Province	City	LL Organization	Record
Ontario	Toronto	High Park	6–0
British Columbia	Vancouver	South Vancouver	4–2
Alberta	Lethbridge	Lethbridge Southwest	4–2
Quebec	Montreal	Notre-Dame-de-Grâce	4–2
Saskatchewan	Regina	North Regina	2–4
New Brunswick	Lancaster	Lancaster	1–5
Quebec (Host)	Salaberry-de-Valleyfield	Valleyfield	0–6

Semi-finals
August 9 – Salaberry-de-Valleyfield
4 Quebec	6
1 Ontario	7
August 9 – Salaberry-de-Valleyfield
3 Alberta	0
2 British Columbia	2

Final
August 10 – Salaberry-de-Valleyfield
1 Ontario	1
2 British Columbia	4

=== Caribbean ===
The tournament took place in Freeport, Bahamas from July 19–25.

Pool A
Country	City	LL Organization	Record
U.S. Virgin Islands	St. Thomas	Elrod Hendrick West	3–1
Puerto Rico	Humacao	Miguel Luzunaris	3–1
Bonaire	Kralendijk	Bonaire	2–2
Bahamas (Host)	Freeport	Grand Bahamas	2–2
Cayman Islands	George Town	Cayman Islands	0–4

Pool B
Country	City	LL Organization	Record
Bahamas	Nassau	Freedom Farm	3–0
Curaçao	Willemstad	Pabao	2–1
Aruba	Oranjestad	Aruba North	1–2
Dominican Republic	San Cristóbal	Hector Delgado	0–3

Semi-finals
July 24 – Freeport
2B Curaçao	6
1A U.S. Virgin Islands	7
July 24 – Freeport
2A Puerto Rico	6
1B Bahamas	4

Final
July 25 – Freeport
1A U.S. Virgin Islands	3
2A Puerto Rico	14

=== Europe & Africa ===
The tournament took place in Kutno, Poland on July 14–21.

Pool A
Country	City	LL Organization	Record
Italy	Emilia	Emilia	4–0
Netherlands	Haarlem	Kennemerland	3–1
Lithuania	Vilnius	Vilnius	2–2
Belarus	Brest	Brest Zubrs	1–3
Moldova	Tiraspol	Kvint	0–4

Pool C
Country	City	LL Organization	Record
Czech Republic	Brno	South Moravia	3–0
Belgium	Antwerp	Flanders East	2–1
(United States) Germany-US	Ramstein	KMC American	1–2
France	Aquitaine	Aquitaine	0–3

Pool B
Country	City	LL Organization	Record
Spain	Catalunya	Catalunya	4–0
United Kingdom	London	London Area Youth	3–1
Ukraine	Kirovohrad	Kirovograd	2–2
Serbia	Belgrade	Serbia	1–3
Poland	Żory	BUKS GepardyŻory	0–4

Quarterfinals
A2	Netherlands	6
B2	United Kingdom	2
C2	Belgium	2
A1	Italy	12

Semifinals
C1	Czech Republic	12
A2	Netherlands	3
B1	Spain	1
A1	Italy	4

Final
C1	Czech Republic	11
B1	Italy	6

=== Japan ===
The first two rounds of the tournament were held on June 28, and the remaining two rounds were played on July 5. All games are played in Tokyo.

Participating teams	Prefecture	City	LL Organization
Chūgoku Champions	Hiroshima	Hiroshima	Hiroshima Aki
Higashikanto Champions	Ibaraki	Ushiku	Ushiku
Hokkaido Champions	Hokkaido	Asahikawa	Asahikawa Chuo
Kanagawa Champions	Kanagawa	Hiratsuka	Hiratsuka
Kansai Champions	Osaka	Toyonaka	Toyonaka
Kansai Runner-Up	Osaka	Ibaraki	Osaka Ibaraki
Kitakanto Champions	Saitama	Ageo	Ageo Nishi
Kyushu Champions	Nagasaki	Nagasaki	Nagasaki Kita
Shikoku Champions	Ehime	Iyo District	Ehime Konan
Shin'etsu Champions	Niigata	Niigata	Niigata Minami
Tōhoku Champions	Fukushima	Shirakawa	Shirakawa
Tōhoku Runner-Up	Miyagi	Miyagi District	Miyagi Rifu
Tōkai Champions	Aichi	Handa	Chita
Tōkai Runner-Up	Shizuoka	Hamamatsu	Hamamatsu Minami
Tokyo Champions	Tokyo	Tokyo	Tokyo Kitasuna
Tokyo Runner-Up	Tokyo	Tokyo	Musashi Fuchu

Round of 16
June 28 – Tokyo
Tokyo Kitasuna	2
(Niigata Prefecture) Niigata Minami	1
June 28 – Tokyo
(Saitama Prefecture) Ageo Nishi	6
(Miyagi Prefecture) Miyagi Rifu	7
June 28 – Tokyo
(Ehime Prefecture) Ehime Konan	2
(Osaka Prefecture) Osaka Ibaraki	14
June 28 – Tokyo
(Ibaraki Prefecture) Ushiku	1
(Aichi Prefecture) Chita	0
June 28 – Tokyo
(Fukushima Prefecture) Shirakawa	21
(Nagasaki Prefecture) Nagasaki Kita	5
June 28 – Tokyo (F/4)
(Kanagawa Prefecture) Hiratsuka	0
(Tokyo) Musashi Fuchu	10
June 28 – Tokyo
(Shizuoka Prefecture) Hamamatsu Minami	4
(Hiroshima Prefecture) Hiroshima Aki	5
June 28 – Tokyo
(Osaka Prefecture) Toyonaka	3
(Hokkaido) Asahikawa Chuo	0

Quarter-finals
June 28 – Tokyo (Note: Resumed on July 4 due to rain.)
Tokyo Kitasuna	2
(Miyagi Prefecture) Miyagi Rifu	1
June 28 – Tokyo
(Osaka Prefecture) Osaka Ibaraki	9
(Ibaraki Prefecture) Ushiku	8
June 28 – Tokyo
(Fukushima Prefecture) Shirakawa	3
(Tokyo) Musashi Fuchu	4
June 28 – Tokyo
(Hiroshima Prefecture) Hiroshima Aki	2
(Osaka Prefecture) Toyonaka	4

Semi-finals
July 5 – Tokyo (F/4)
(Osaka Prefecture) Osaka Ibaraki	2
Tokyo Kitasuna	12
July 5 – Tokyo (F/8)
(Tokyo) Musashi Fuchu	4
(Osaka Prefecture) Toyonaka	5

Final
July 5 – Tokyo (F/4)
Tokyo Kitasuna	12
(Osaka Prefecture) Toyonaka	0

=== Latin America ===
The tournament took place in Managua, Nicaragua from June 22–29.

Pool A
Country	City	LL Organization	Record
Nicaragua (A)	Chinandega	Chinandega	5–1
Colombia	Cartagena	Falcon	3–3
El Salvador	San Salvador	Ayabeisi	2–2
Guatemala	Guatemala City	Liga Pequeña Javier de Baseball	1–3
Costa Rica	San José	Upala	0–4

Pool B
Country	City	LL Organization	Record
Venezuela	Maracaibo	Coquivacoa	5–0
Panama	Panama City	Tomas Munoz	3–1
Nicaragua (B)	Managua	14 de September	1–3
Honduras	San Pedro Sula	Liga Marinera	0–3

Semi-finals
June 28 – Managua
2B Panama	5
1A Nicaragua A	0
June 28 – Managua
2A Colombia	2
1B Venezuela	4

Final
June 29 – Managua
2B Panama	5
1B Venezuela	8

=== Mexico ===
The tournament took place in Monterrey, Nuevo León during July 5–11.

Pool A
City	LL Organization	Record
Mexicali, Baja California	Félix Arce	6–0
(Chihuahua (state)) Ciudad Juárez, Chihuahua	El Granjero	5–1
Monterrey, Nuevo León	Buenos Aires	4–2
Nuevo Laredo, Tamaulipas	Oriente	3–3
Poza Rica, Veracruz	Poza Rica A.C.	2–4
Saltillo, Coahuila	Saltillo	1–5
Zapopan, Jalisco	Legión Zapopan	0–6

Pool B
City	LL Organization	Record
Guadalupe, Nuevo León	Linda Vista	6–0
Tijuana, Baja California	Municipal De Tijuana	5–1
Guadalajara, Jalisco	Guadalara Sutaj	4–2
Matamoros, Tamaulipas	Matamoros	3–3
Medellín, Veracruz	Veracruzana Beto Ávila	2–4
(Chihuahua (state)) Ciudad Juárez, Chihuahua	Satélite	1–5
Monclova, Coahuila	Carlos Segura Fabela	0–6

Semi-finals
July 10 – Monterrey
2B (Baja California) Municipal De Tijuana	7
1A (Baja California) Félix Arce	11
July 10 – Monterrey
2A (Chihuahua (state)) El Granjero	2
1B (Nuevo León) Linda Vista	9

Final
July 11 – Monterrey
1A (Baja California) Félix Arce	6
1B (Nuevo León) Linda Vista	12
