= 2015 Little League World Series qualification =

Children's baseball competition qualification

United States
- Great Lakes winner: Bowling Green, Kentucky
- Mid-Atlantic winner: Lewisberry, Pennsylvania
- Midwest winner: Webb City, Missouri
- New England winner: Cranston, Rhode Island
- Northwest winner: Portland, Oregon
- Southeast winner: Taylors, South Carolina
- Southwest winner: Pearland, Texas
- West winner: Bonita, California

International
- Asia-Pacific and Middle East winner: Taipei, Taiwan
- Australia winner: (Australia) Sydney, New South Wales
- Canada winner: (Canada) White Rock, British Columbia
- Caribbean winner: Santiago de los Caballeros, Dominican Republic
- Europe and Africa winner: Kampala, Uganda
- Japan winner: (Japan) Tokyo
- Latin America winner: Barquisimeto, Venezuela
- Mexico winner: (Mexico) Mexicali, Baja California

Tournaments

Qualification for the 2015 Little League World Series took place in eight United States regions and eight international regions from June through August 2015. Starting this year, all eight United States regional tournaments used a modified double elimination format and moved away from the round robin format used since the 1990s.

== United States ==
=== Great Lakes ===
The tournament took place in Indianapolis, Indiana from August 9–15.

State	City	LL Organization	Record
Illinois	Olney	Olney	1–2
Indiana	New Albany	New Albany	2–2
Kentucky	Bowling Green	Bowling Green Eastern	3–1
Michigan	Bay City	Bay City Southwest	0–2
Ohio	Hamilton	West Side	2–2
Wisconsin	Burlington	Burlington	2–1

First Round
(Indiana)	Indiana	3
(Ohio)	Ohio	2
(Illinois)	Illinois	10
(Michigan)	Michigan	4
Lower round 1
(Ohio)	Ohio	7
(Illinois)	Illinois	6
(Michigan)	Michigan	0
(Indiana)	Indiana	3

Second Round
(Kentucky)	Kentucky	5
(Indiana)	Indiana	2
(Wisconsin)	Wisconsin (F/5)	10
(Illinois)	Illinois	0
Lower round 2
(Ohio)	Ohio	5
(Indiana)	Indiana	4

Semi-Finals
(Kentucky)	Kentucky	0
(Wisconsin)	Wisconsin (F/4)	10
Lower final
(Kentucky)	Kentucky	4
(Ohio)	Ohio	3

Great Lakes Championship
(Wisconsin)	Wisconsin	0
(Kentucky)	Kentucky (F/4)	13

=== Mid-Atlantic ===
The tournament took place in Bristol, Connecticut from August 10–16.

State	City	LL Organization	Record
Delaware	Middletown	M-O-T	0–2
Maryland	Delmar	Delmar	3–2
New Jersey	Jackson	Jackson Township	2–2
New York	Maine-Endwell	Maine-Endwell	2–2
Pennsylvania	Lewisberry	Red Land	3–0
Washington, D.C.		Capitol City	0–2

First Round
(Washington, D.C.)	Washington, D.C.	5
(Maryland)	Maryland	10
(Delaware)	Delaware	6
(New York (state))	New York	9
Lower round 1
(Washington, D.C.)	Washington, D.C.	8
(New York (state))	New York	10
(Delaware)	Delaware	3
(Maryland)	Maryland (F/4)	15

Second Round
(New Jersey)	New Jersey	7
(Maryland)	Maryland	4
(Pennsylvania)	Pennsylvania	11
(New York (state))	New York	3
Lower round 2
(New York (state))	New York	8
(Maryland)	Maryland	15

Semi-Finals
(New Jersey)	New Jersey	2
(Pennsylvania)	Pennsylvania	13
Lower final
(New Jersey)	New Jersey (F/4)	10
(Maryland)	Maryland	0

Mid-Atlantic Championship
(Pennsylvania)	Pennsylvania	12
(New Jersey)	New Jersey	0

=== Midwest ===
The tournament took place in Indianapolis, Indiana from August 9–15.

Note: North Dakota and South Dakota are organized into a single Little League district.

State	City	LL Organization	Record
Iowa	Des Moines	Grandview	1–2
Kansas	Frontenac	Frontenac Youth	0–2
Minnesota	Coon Rapids	Coon Rapids Cardinal	2–1
Missouri	Webb City	Webb City	4–1
Nebraska	Omaha	Memorial	2–2
South Dakota	Rapid City	Canyon Lake	1–2

First Round
(Nebraska)	Nebraska (F/7)	3
(Missouri)	Missouri	2
(Kansas)	Kansas	3
(Iowa)	Iowa	11
Lower round 1
(Missouri)	Missouri	11
(Iowa)	Iowa	3
(Kansas)	Kansas	6
(Nebraska)	Nebraska	11

Second Round
(South Dakota)	South Dakota	5
(Nebraska)	Nebraska	2
(Minnesota)	Minnesota	11
(Iowa)	Iowa	7
Lower round 2
(Missouri)	Missouri	15
(Nebraska)	Nebraska	4

Semi-Finals
(South Dakota)	South Dakota	7
(Minnesota)	Minnesota	15
Lower final
(South Dakota)	South Dakota	2
(Missouri)	Missouri (F/5)	13

Midwest Championship
(Minnesota)	Minnesota	0
(Missouri)	Missouri (F/4)	10

=== New England ===
The tournament took place in Bristol, Connecticut from August 10–16.

State	City	LL Organization	Record
Connecticut	Waterford	Waterford	2–2
Maine	Biddeford	Biddeford	0–2
Massachusetts	Newton	Newton SouthEast	1–2
New Hampshire	Bedford	Bedford	2–1
Rhode Island	Cranston	Cranston Western	4–1
Vermont	South Burlington	South Burlington	1–2

First Round
(Maine)	Maine	0
(Massachusetts)	Massachusetts	11
(Connecticut)	Connecticut	3
(Rhode Island)	Rhode Island	2
Lower round 1
(Maine)	Maine	5
(Connecticut)	Connecticut (F/4)	15
(Rhode Island)	Rhode Island	11
(Massachusetts)	Massachusetts	4

Second Round
(Vermont)	Vermont	10
(Massachusetts)	Massachusetts	5
(New Hampshire)	New Hampshire (F/4)	16
(Connecticut)	Connecticut	1
Lower round 2
(Connecticut)	Connecticut	2
(Rhode Island)	Rhode Island (F/7)	3

Semi-Finals
(Vermont)	Vermont	5
(New Hampshire)	New Hampshire	11
Lower final
(Vermont)	Vermont	1
(Rhode Island)	Rhode Island	7

New England Championship
(New Hampshire)	New Hampshire	4
(Rhode Island)	Rhode Island	10

=== Northwest ===
The tournament took place in San Bernardino, California from August 9–15.

State	City	LL Organization	Record
Alaska	Juneau	Gastineau Channel	0–2
Idaho	Eagle	West Valley	3–2
Montana	Billings	Boulder Arrowhead	1–2
Oregon	Portland	Wilshire/Riverside	4–0
Washington	Vancouver	Cascade	2–2
Wyoming	Gillette	Gillette	0–2

First Round
(Wyoming)	Wyoming	3
(Oregon)	Oregon	12
(Idaho)	Idaho	0
(Washington (state))	Washington	5
Lower round 1
(Wyoming)	Wyoming	1
(Montana)	Montana	10
(Idaho)	Idaho (F/4)	10
(Alaska)	Alaska	0

Second Round
(Alaska)	Alaska	6
(Oregon)	Oregon	11
(Montana)	Montana	2
(Washington (state))	Washington	11
Lower round 2
(Montana)	Montana	11
(Idaho)	Idaho	16

Semi-Finals
(Oregon)	Oregon	10
(Washington (state))	Washington	6
Lower final
(Washington (state))	Washington	7
(Idaho)	Idaho	8

Northwest Championship
(Oregon)	Oregon	15
(Idaho)	Idaho	3

=== Southeast ===
The tournament took place in Warner Robins, Georgia from August 7–13.

State	City	LL Organization	Record
Alabama	Phenix City	Phenix City American	0–2
Florida	Tampa	Keystone	2–2
Georgia	Peachtree City	Peachtree City American	1–2
North Carolina	Wilson	Wilson City	0–2
South Carolina	Taylors	Northwood	4–0
Tennessee	Nashville	South Nashville American	2–2
Virginia	Mechanicsville	Mechanicsville National	4–2
West Virginia	Bridgeport	Bridgeport	1–2

Upper round 1	Upper round 2	Upper final	Southeast Championship
(North Carolina)	North Carolina	3
(South Carolina)	South Carolina	9
(South Carolina)	South Carolina (F/5)	18
(Tennessee)	Tennessee	3
(Tennessee)	Tennessee	4
(West Virginia)	West Virginia	2
(South Carolina)	South Carolina	5
(Florida)	Florida	4
(Alabama)	Alabama	1
(Florida)	Florida	5
(Florida)	Florida	8
(Virginia)	Virginia	4
(Georgia (U.S. state))	Georgia	3
(Virginia)	Virginia	5	(South Carolina)	South Carolina	7
(Virginia)	Virginia	0
Lower round 1	Lower round 2	Lower round 3	Lower final
(West Virginia)	West Virginia	3
(North Carolina)	North Carolina	1	(Virginia)	Virginia (F/4)	30	(Florida)	Florida	2
(West Virginia)	West Virginia	3	(Virginia)	Virginia	10	(Virginia)	Virginia	5
(Tennessee)	Tennessee	6
(Georgia (U.S. state))	Georgia	4
(Alabama)	Alabama	0	(Tennessee)	Tennessee	5
(Georgia (U.S. state))	Georgia (F/4)	10

=== Southwest ===
The tournament took place in Waco, Texas from August 7–13.

State	City	LL Organization	Record
Arkansas	Pine Bluff	Pine Bluff Western	3–2
Colorado	Boulder	North Boulder	3–2
Louisiana	Jefferson Parish	Eastbank	2–2
Mississippi	Starkville	Starkville	1–2
New Mexico	Albuquerque	Paradise Hills	0–2
Oklahoma	Tulsa	Tulsa National	0–2
Texas East	Pearland	Pearland West	4–0
Texas West	San Antonio	McAllister Park National	1–2

Upper round 1	Upper round 2	Upper final	Southwest Championship
(Louisiana)	Louisiana	3
(Texas)	Texas West	8
(Texas)	Texas West	4
(Colorado)	Colorado	5
(Oklahoma)	Oklahoma	1
(Colorado)	Colorado	9
(Colorado)	Colorado	1
(Texas)	Texas East	9
(Arkansas)	Arkansas	4
(Texas)	Texas East (F/7)	8
(Texas)	Texas East (F/4)	15
(Mississippi)	Mississippi	0
(Mississippi)	Mississippi (F/5)	10
(New Mexico)	New Mexico	0	(Texas)	Texas East	9
(Colorado)	Colorado	2
Lower round 1	Lower round 2	Lower round 3	Lower final
(Louisiana)	Louisiana	12
(Louisiana)	Louisiana (F/4)	13	(Mississippi)	Mississippi	6	(Colorado)	Colorado	11
(Oklahoma)	Oklahoma	1	(Louisiana)	Louisiana	0	(Arkansas)	Arkansas	9
(Arkansas)	Arkansas	1
(Arkansas)	Arkansas	9
(Arkansas)	Arkansas	9	(Texas)	Texas West	7
(New Mexico)	New Mexico	4

=== West ===
The tournament took place in San Bernardino, California from August 9–15.

State	City	LL Organization	Record
Arizona	Chandler	Chandler National North	1–2
Hawaii	Waipahu	Waipio	3–2
Nevada	Henderson	Paseo Verde	1–2
Northern California	San Jose	Cambrian Park	0–2
Southern California	Bonita	Sweetwater Valley	4–0
Utah	Santa Clara	Snow Canyon	1–2

First Round
(California)	Northern California	0
(Arizona)	Arizona	1
(Hawaii)	Hawaii	9
(California)	Southern California	16
Lower round 1
(California)	Northern California	3
(Nevada)	Nevada	9
(Hawaii)	Hawaii (F/7)	12
(Arizona)	Arizona	9

Second Round
(Utah)	Utah (F/5)	11
(Arizona)	Arizona	1
(Nevada)	Nevada	2
(California)	Southern California	11
Lower round 2
(Nevada)	Nevada	3
(Hawaii)	Hawaii (F/5)	14

Semi-Finals
(Utah)	Utah	1
(California)	Southern California (F/4)	11
Lower final
(Utah)	Utah	0
(Hawaii)	Hawaii (F/4)	15

West Championship
(California)	Southern California	12
(Hawaii)	Hawaii	10

== International ==
=== Asia-Pacific and Middle East ===
The tournament took place in Guilin, China from July 13–21.

Pool A
Country	City	LL Organization	Record
Philippines	Makati	Illam Central	3–1
Hong Kong		Hong Kong	2–2
Northern Mariana Islands	Saipan	Saipan	2–2
Saudi Arabia	Dhahran	Arabian American	2–2
China	Guangzhou	Guangzhou	0–4

Pool B
Country	City	LL Organization	Record
South Korea	Seoul	East Seoul	4–0
Taiwan	Taipei	Tung Yuan	3–1
Indonesia	Jakarta		1–1
Guam	Hagåtña		0–2
Thailand	Bangkok		0–2

Semi-finals
July 19 – Guilin
2B Taiwan	11
1A Philippines	6
July 19 – Guilin
2A Hong Kong	0
1B South Korea	16

Final
July 20 – Guilin
2B Taiwan	3
1B South Korea	2

=== Australia ===
The tournament took place in Lismore, New South Wales on June 4–9. The top two teams in each pool advance to the elimination round, where they are seeded one through eight based on overall record. The "runs against ratio" (RAR) is used as the tiebreaker. It is calculated by the number of runs scored against a team, divided by the number of defensive innings the team played.

Pool A
State/Territory	LL Organization	Record
New South Wales	Cronulla	4–0
Victoria	Southern Mariners	2–2
New South Wales	Manly	2–2
Queensland	Gold Coast	1–3
Western Australia	West Coast	1–3

Pool C
State/Territory	LL Organization	Record
Western Australia	Swan Hills	4–0
Western Australia	Perth Metro East	3–1
South Australia	Adelaide West	2–2
New South Wales	Central Coast	1–3
Northern Territory	Northern Territory	0–4

Pool B
State/Territory	LL Organization	Record
New South Wales	Hills	4–0
Western Australia	Perth Metro North	3–1
South Australia	Adelaide North	2–2
Victoria	Yarra Rangers	1–3
Queensland	Brisbane North	0–4

Pool D
State/Territory	LL Organization	Record
New South Wales	Ryde North	4–0
Western Australia	Perth Metro Central	3–1
New South Wales	Ryde South	2–2
Victoria	Northern Diamondbacks	1–3
Australian Capital Territory	Canberra	0–4

Quarter-finals
June 7 – Lismore (F/5)
(New South Wales) Hills	12
(Western Australia) Perth Metro North	5
June 7 – Lismore
(New South Wales) Cronulla	3
(Western Australia) Perth Metro Central	1
June 7 – Lismore
(Western Australia) Swan Hills	4
(Victoria (state)) Southern Mariners	0
June 7 – Lismore (F/4)
(New South Wales) Ryde North	12
(Western Australia) Perth Metro East	2

Semi-finals
June 8 – Lismore
(New South Wales) Hills	2
(New South Wales) Cronulla	4
June 8 – Lismore
(Western Australia) Swan Hills	6
(New South Wales) Ryde North	1

Australia Championship
June 9 – Lismore
(New South Wales) Cronulla	7
(Western Australia) Swan Hills	3
Third
June 9 – Lismore
(New South Wales) Hills	6
(New South Wales) Ryde North	7

=== Canada ===
The tournament took place in Ottawa, Ontario from August 7–16.

Pos	Team	Pld	W	L	RF	RA	RD	PCT	Qualification	(British Columbia)	(Ontario)	(Ontario) (H)	(Nova Scotia)	(Alberta)	(Quebec)	(Saskatchewan)
1	(British Columbia) White Rock South Surrey	6	5	1	86	16	+70	.833	Advance to Semifinals	—	9–8	5–6	22–1	5–1	14–0	31–0
2	(Ontario) High Park	6	5	1	58	23	+35	.833	Advance to Semifinals	8–9	—	14–4	6–5	8–0	12–3	10–2
3	(Ontario) East Nepean (H)	6	5	1	56	23	+33	.833	Advance to Semifinals	6–5	4–14	—	16–0	5–2	14–2	11–0
4	(Nova Scotia) Glace Bay	6	3	3	48	73	−25	.500	Advance to Semifinals	1–22	5–6	0–16	—	6–3	20–14	16–12
5	(Alberta) Lethbridge Southwest	6	2	4	39	26	+13	.333		1–5	0–8	2–5	3–6	—	15–1	18–1
6	(Quebec) Notre-Dame-de-Grâce	6	1	5	31	78	−47	.167		0–14	3–12	2–14	14–20	1–15	—	11–3
7	(Saskatchewan) Moose Jaw	6	0	6	18	97	−79	.000		0–31	2–10	0–11	12–16	1–18	3–11	—

(H) Hosts

Semifinals
3	(Ontario) East Nepean	2
2	(Ontario) High Park	1
4	(Nova Scotia) Glace Bay (F/5)	1
1	(British Columbia) White Rock South Surrey	11

Canada Championship
3	(Ontario) East Nepean (F/5)	0
1	(British Columbia) White Rock South Surrey	16

=== Caribbean ===
The tournament took place in Willemstad, Curaçao from July 18–25.

Pos	Team	Pld	W	L	RF	RA	RD	PCT	Qualification
1	Curaçao (A)	5	5	0	34	18	+16	1.000	Advance to Semifinals
2	Dominican Republic	5	4	1	38	25	+13	.800	Advance to Semifinals
3	Curaçao (B)	5	3	2	37	33	+4	.600	Advance to Semifinals
4	Aruba	5	1	4	29	33	−4	.200	Advance to Semifinals
5	U.S. Virgin Islands	5	1	4	22	41	−19	.200	
6	Puerto Rico	5	1	4	28	38	−10	.200	

Semifinals
3	Curaçao (B)	1
2	Dominican Republic	3
4	Aruba	4
1	Curaçao (A)	0

Caribbean Championship
2	Dominican Republic	13
4	Aruba	2
Consolation
3	(Curaçao) Pariba	2
1	(Curaçao) Pabao	13

=== Europe and Africa ===
The tournament took place in Kutno, Poland from July 16–23. The format of the tournament is double elimination.

Teams
Country	City	LL Organization	Record
Austria	Vienna	East Austria	1–2
Belarus	Brest	Brest Zubrs	1–2
Belgium	Brussels	Brussels	0–2
Czech Republic	Brno	South Moravia	2–2
Germany–United States	Ramstein	KMC American	2–2
Hungary	Budapest	Central	0–2
Italy	Emilia	Emilia	3–2
Moldova	Tiraspol	Kvint	1–2
Netherlands	Rotterdam	Rotterdam	3–2
Poland	Wodzisław Śląski	Zory/Jastrzebie/Rybnik	0–2
Spain	Barcelona	Catalunya	6–2
Uganda	Kampala	AVRS Secondary School	5–0
United Kingdom	London	London Youth Baseball	2–2
Ukraine	Kirovograd	Kirovograd Center	0–2

Results
July 16
Game	Visitor	Score	Home
1	Hungary (0–1)	0–10	Italy (1–0)
2	(United States) Germany-USA (1–0)	4–3	Ukraine (0–1)
3	United Kingdom (0–1)	7–8	Netherlands (1–0)
4	Uganda (1–0)	21–1	Belgium (0–1)
5	Belarus (1–0)	11–4	Austria (0–1)
6	Spain (1–0)	15–2	Moldova (0–1)
July 17
Game	Visitor	Score	Home
7	Poland (0–1)	4–15	Italy (2–0)
8	(United States) Germany-USA (2–0)	10–4	Netherlands (1–1)
9	Belarus (1–1)	1–16	Uganda (2–0)
10	Czech Republic (1–0)	13–3	Spain (1–1)
11	Austria (1–1)	5–1	Belgium (0–2)
12	Ukraine (0–2)	2–7	United Kingdom (1–1)
July 18
Game	Visitor	Score	Home
13	Poland (0–2)	5–6	Moldova (1–1)
14	Hungary (0–2)	2–8	Spain (2–1)
15	Netherlands (2–1)	15–3	Austria (1–2)
16	United Kingdom (2–1)	14–4	Belarus (1–2)
July 19
Game	Visitor	Score	Home
17	Italy (3–0)	10–1	(United States) Germany-USA (2–1)
18	Czech Republic (1–1)	0–10	Uganda (3–0)
19	Moldova (1–2)	2–12	Netherlands (3–1)
20	United Kingdom (2–2)	5–11	Spain (3–1)
July 20
Game	Visitor	Score	Home
21	Netherlands (3–2)	1–5	Czech Republic (2–1)
22	Spain (4–1)	10–0	(United States) Germany-USA (2–2)
23	Italy (3–1)	0–4	Uganda (4–0)
July 21
Game	Visitor	Score	Home
24	Spain (5–1)	11–0	Czech Republic (2–2)
July 22
Game	Visitor	Score	Home
25	Spain (6–1)	5–2	Italy (3–2)
July 23
Game	Visitor	Score	Home
26	Uganda (5–0)	16–0	Spain (6–2)

=== Japan ===
The first two rounds of the tournament took place on July 19. The semifinals and championship were played on July 20. All games were played in Shirakawa, Fukushima.

Participating teams	Prefecture	City	LL Organization
Chūgoku Champions	Okayama	Okayama	Okayama
Higashikanto Champions	Ibaraki	Ushiku	Ushiku
Hokkaido Champions	Hokkaido	Sapporo	Sapporo Shiroishi
Kanagawa Champions	Kanagawa	Hiratsuka	Hiratsuka
Kansai Champions	Nara	Nara	Keina
Kansai Runner-Up	Osaka	Kaizuka	Kaizuka
Kitakanto Champions	Saitama	Urawa	Urawa
Kyushu Champions	Miyazaki	Miyakonojō	Miyakonojō
Shikoku Champions	Ehime	Iyo District	Ehime Konan
Shin'etsu Champions	Nagano	Nagano	Nagano Minami
Tōhoku Champions	Fukushima	Shirakawa	Shirakawa
Tōhoku Runner-Up	Miyagi	Shiogama	Shiogama
Tōkai Champions	Aichi	Ichinomiya	Owari Ichimiya
Tōkai Runner-Up	Shizuoka	Fuji	Fuji
Tokyo Champions	Tokyo	Tokyo	Tokyo Kitasuna
Tokyo Runner-Up	Tokyo	Tokyo	Hachioji

Opening Round
July 19 – Shirakawa
(Fukushima Prefecture) Shirakawa	7
(Kanagawa Prefecture) Hiratsuka	9
July 19 – Shirakawa
(Ibaraki Prefecture) Ushiku	4
(Osaka Prefecture) Kaizuka	0
July 19 – Shirakawa
(Hokkaido) Sapporo Shiroishi	0
(Tokyo) Hachiouji	16
July 19 – Shirakawa
(Saitama Prefecture) Urawa	3
(Aichi Prefecture) Owari Ichinomiya (F/4)	4
July 19 – Shirakawa
(Okayama Prefecture) Okayama	1
(Miyagi Prefecture) Shiogama	7
July 19 – Shirakawa
(Nara Prefecture) Keina	2
(Nagano Prefecture) Nagano Minami	3
July 19 – Shirakawa
(Shizuoka Prefecture) Fuji	2
(Miyazaki Prefecture) Miyakonojō	1
July 19 – Shirakawa
Tokyo Kitasuna	10
(Ehime Prefecture) Ehime Konan	0

Quarterfinals
July 19 – Shirakawa
(Kanagawa Prefecture) Hiratsuka	9
(Ibaraki Prefecture) Ushiku	2
July 19 – Shirakawa
(Tokyo) Hachiouji (F/4)	15
(Aichi Prefecture) Owari Ichinomiya	2
July 19 – Shirakawa
(Miyagi Prefecture) Shiogama	0
(Nagano Prefecture) Nagano Minami	8
July 19 – Shirakawa
(Shizuoka Prefecture) Fuji	0
Tokyo Kitasuna (F/5)	10

Semifinals
July 20 – Shirakawa
(Kanagawa Prefecture) Hiratsuka	2
(Tokyo) Hachiouji	4
July 20 – Shirakawa
(Nagano Prefecture) Nagano Minami	1
Tokyo Kitasuna	4

Championship
July 20 – Shirakawa
(Tokyo) Hachiouji	3
Tokyo Kitasuna (F/4)	20

=== Latin America ===
The tournament took place in Panama City, Panama from July 11–18.

Country	City	LL Organization	Record
Venezuela	Barquisimeto	Cardenales	6–0
Panama (B)	San Miguelito	San Antonio	4–2
Panama (A)	Santiago de Veraguas	Activo 20-30	4–2
Colombia	Cartagena	Falcon	2–4
Ecuador	Guayaquil	C Unidas Miraflores	2–4
Nicaragua	Managua	Ciudad Sandino	2–4
Guatemala	Guatemala City	Liga Pequena Javier de Baseball	1–5

Semi-finals
July 17 – Panama City
3 Panama (A)	7
2 Panama (B)	0
July 17 – Panama City
4 Colombia	3
1 Venezuela	9

Final
July 18 – Panama City
3 Panama (A)	0
1 Venezuela	5

=== Mexico ===
The tournament took place in Matamoros, Tamaulipas from July 11–17.

Pool A
State	City	LL Organization	Record
Tamaulipas	Matamoros	Villa Del Refugio	6–0
Sonora	Hermosillo	Conno de Hermosillo	5–1
Chihuahua	Ciudad Juárez	Satélite	4–2
Nuevo León	Monterrey	Mitras	3–3
Veracruz	Poza Rica	Poza Rica A.C.	1–5
Jalisco	Zapopan	Legión Zapopan	1–5
Durango	Lerdo	C.D. Lerdo Durango	1–5

Pool B
State	City	LL Organization	Record
Nuevo León	San Nicolás de los Garza	San Nicolas de los Garza	5–1
Baja California	Mexicali	Seguro Social	5–1
Tamaulipas	Matamoros	Matamoros	4–2
Veracruz	Poza Rica	Poza Rica Municipal	3–3
Chihuahua	Delicias	A Cura Trillo	2–4
Coahuila	Sabinas	Juvenil De Sabinas	2–4
Jalisco	Guadalajara	Sutaj Alfarera	0–6

Semi-finals
July 16 – Matamoros
2B (Baja California) Seguro Social	4
1A (Tamaulipas) Villa Del Refugio	2
July 16 – Matamoros
2A (Sonora) Conno de Hermosillo	6
1B (Nuevo León) San Nicolas	1

Final
July 17 – Matamoros
2B (Baja California) Seguro Social	13
2A (Sonora) Conno de Hermosillo	7
