= 2017 Little League World Series qualification =

Children's baseball competition qualification

United States
- Great Lakes winner: Grosse Pointe Woods, Michigan
- Mid-Atlantic winner: Jackson, New Jersey
- Midwest winner: Sioux Falls, South Dakota
- New England winner: Fairfield, Connecticut
- Northwest winner: (Washington (state)) Walla Walla, Washington
- Southeast winner: Greenville, North Carolina
- Southwest winner: Lufkin, Texas
- West winner: Rancho Santa Margarita, California

International
- Asia-Pacific and Middle East winner: Seoul, South Korea
- Australia winner: (Australia) Sydney, New South Wales
- Canada winner: (Canada) White Rock, British Columbia
- Caribbean winner: Santiago de los Caballeros, Dominican Republic
- Europe and Africa winner: Emilia, Italy
- Japan winner: (Japan) Tokyo
- Latin America winner: Maracaibo, Venezuela
- Mexico winner: (Mexico) Reynosa, Tamaulipas

Tournaments

Qualification for the 2017 Little League World Series took place in eight United States regions and eight international regions from June through August 2017.

== United States ==
=== Great Lakes ===
The tournament took place in Westfield, Indiana from August 6–12.

State	City	LL Organization	Record
Illinois	Hinsdale	Hinsdale	2–1
Indiana	New Albany	New Albany	0–2
Kentucky	Lexington	Lexington Eastern	2–2
Michigan	Grosse Pointe Woods	Grosse Pointe Woods-Shores	4–1
Ohio	Hamilton	West Side	2–2
Wisconsin	Wausau	Wausau National	0–2

August 7 – Game 3
Michigan	2
August 6 – Game 1 (F/4)
Ohio	10
Wisconsin	4
August 9 – Game 7
Ohio	22
Ohio	4
August 6 – Game 2
Illinois	5
Indiana	0
August 7 – Game 4
Kentucky	1
Illinois	5
Kentucky	2
August 12 – Championship
Illinois	3
August 8 – Game 5
Michigan	6
Wisconsin	5
August 10 – Game 8 (F/4)
Kentucky	10
Kentucky	0
August 8 – Game 6
Michigan	10
Indiana	3
August 11 – Game 9
Michigan	4
Ohio	3
Michigan	11

=== Mid-Atlantic ===
The tournament took place in Bristol, Connecticut August 6–12.

State	City	LL Organization	Record
Delaware	Milton	Milton	1–2
Maryland	Thurmont	Thurmont	3–2
New Jersey	Jackson	Holbrook	4–0
New York	Plainview	Plainview	0–2
Pennsylvania	Oaks	Upper Providence	2–2
Washington, D.C.		Northwest Washington	0–2

August 7 – Game 3
New York	0
August 6 – Game 1 (F/4)
New Jersey	9
New Jersey	16
August 9 – Game 7
Washington, D.C.	6
New Jersey	10
August 6 – Game 2
Pennsylvania	6
Delaware	3
August 7 – Game 4
Pennsylvania	4
Maryland	5
Pennsylvania	10
August 12 – Championship
New Jersey	8
August 8 – Game 5
Maryland	3
Washington, D.C.	2
August 10 – Game 8
Maryland	7
Maryland	5
August 8 – Game 6
Delaware	2
Delaware	7
August 11 – Game 9 (F/4)
New York	4
Pennsylvania	4
Maryland	14

=== Midwest ===
The tournament took place in Westfield, Indiana August 6–12.

Note: North Dakota and South Dakota are organized into a single Little League district.

State	City	LL Organization	Record
Iowa	Johnston	Johnston	1–2
Kansas	Cherokee	Cherokee Community	0–2
Minnesota	Coon Rapids	Coon Rapids Andover American	0–2
Missouri	Webb City	Webb City	2–2
Nebraska	Kearney	Kearney	3–2
South Dakota	Sioux Falls	Sioux Falls	4–0

August 7 – Game 3
Missouri	4
August 6 – Game 1
Nebraska	2
Nebraska	3
August 9 – Game 7
Iowa	2
Missouri	5
August 6 – Game 2
South Dakota	6
South Dakota	9
August 7 – Game 4
Kansas	0
Minnesota	1
South Dakota	2
August 12 – Championship
South Dakota	6
August 8 – Game 5
Missouri	0
Iowa	2
August 10 – Game 8
Minnesota	0
Iowa	5
August 8 – Game 6
Nebraska	6
Kansas	5
August 11 – Game 9
Nebraska	6
Missouri	9
Nebraska	5

=== New England ===
The tournament took place in Bristol, Connecticut August 6–12.

State	City	LL Organization	Record
Connecticut	Fairfield	Fairfield American	3–0
Maine	South Portland	South Portland American	4–2
Massachusetts	Holden	Holden	0–2
New Hampshire	Goffstown	Goffstown Junior Baseball	2–2
Rhode Island	Cumberland	Cumberland American	0–2
Vermont	Essex Junction	Essex Junction	1–2

August 7 – Game 3
Connecticut	8
August 6 – Game 1
Maine	0
Vermont	7
August 9 – Game 7
Maine	9
Connecticut	9
August 6 – Game 2 (F/4)
New Hampshire	4
Rhode Island	0
August 7 – Game 4
New Hampshire	13
Massachusetts	2
New Hampshire	8
August 12 – Championship
Connecticut	10
August 8 – Game 5
Maine	0
Vermont	7
August 10 – Game 8
Massachusetts	5
Vermont	5
August 8 – Game 6
Maine	8
Rhode Island	2
August 11 – Game 9
Maine	3
New Hampshire	6
Maine	7

=== Northwest ===
The tournament took place in San Bernardino, California August 6–12.

State	City	LL Organization	Record
Alaska	Ketchikan	Ketchikan	0–2
Idaho	Lewiston	Lewiston	1–2
Montana	Missoula	Mount Sentinel	3–2
Oregon	La Grande	La Grande	2–1
Washington	Walla Walla	Walla Walla Valley	4–1
Wyoming	Gillette	Gillette	0–2

August 7 – Game 3 (F/7)
Idaho	7
August 6 – Game 1 (F/4)
Washington	8
Wyoming	0
August 10 – Game 8
Washington	13
Washington	4
August 6 – Game 2 (F/4)
Oregon	8
Montana	12
August 7 – Game 4 (F/7)
Alaska	0
Oregon	3
Montana	2
August 12 – Championship
Oregon	3
August 8 – Game 5
Washington	4
Wyoming	1
August 9 – Game 7 (F/4)
Montana	6
Montana	16
August 8 – Game 6 (F/5)
Idaho	1
Alaska	4
August 11 – Game 9
Idaho	14
Washington	10
Montana	6

=== Southeast ===
The tournament took place in Warner Robins, Georgia August 4–9.

State	City	LL Organization	Record
Alabama	Phenix City	Ladonia Youth Sports	2–2
Florida	Boynton Beach	West Boynton Beach	1–2
Georgia	Peachtree City	Peachtree City National	4–2
North Carolina	Greenville	North State	4–0
South Carolina	Greenville	Greenville	1–2
Tennessee	Goodlettsville	Goodlettsville Baseball	2–2
Virginia	Alexandria	Fort Hunt	0–2
West Virginia	Logan	Logan	0–2

August 4 – Game 1
Tennessee	6
August 5 – Game 5
Alabama	2
Tennessee	12
August 4 – Game 2
Georgia	3
Virginia	3
August 7 – Game 12
Georgia	9
Tennessee	2
August 5 – Game 3
North Carolina	4
Florida	11
August 6 – Game 8
West Virginia	7
Florida	0
August 5 – Game 4
North Carolina	5
South Carolina	2
North Carolina	9
August 9 – Championship
North Carolina	8
August 5 – Game 6
Georgia	6
Alabama	5
August 6 – Game 9 (F/7)
Virginia	4
Florida	10
Alabama	12
August 7 – Game 11
Alabama	11
August 6 – Game 7
Georgia	14
West Virginia	4
August 6 – Game 10 (F/4)
South Carolina	8
Georgia	14
South Carolina	2
August 8 – Game 13
Tennessee	1
Georgia	4

=== Southwest ===
The tournament took place in Waco, Texas August 3–9.

State	City	LL Organization	Record
Arkansas	White Hall	White Hall	0–2
Colorado	Colorado Springs	Academy	1–2
Louisiana	River Ridge	Eastbank	2–2
Mississippi	Starkville	Starkville	0–2
New Mexico	Albuquerque	Eastdale	2–2
Oklahoma	Tulsa	Tulsa National	1–2
Texas East	Lufkin	Lufkin	4–0
Texas West	San Antonio	McAllister Park National	4–2

August 3 – Game 1
Colorado	1
August 5 – Game 7 (F/7)
Texas East	5
Texas East	11
August 3 – Game 2 (F/4)
Texas West	10
Texas West	12
August 7 – Game 12
Mississippi	0
Texas East	8
August 3 – Game 3
Louisiana	0
Louisiana	7
August 5 – Game 8 (F/5)
Oklahoma	4
Louisiana	11
August 3 – Game 4
New Mexico	1
Arkansas	2
New Mexico	3
August 9 – Championship
Texas East	2
August 4 – Game 5
Texas West	1
Colorado	4
August 6 – Game 9
Mississippi	3
New Mexico	6
Colorado	4
August 7 – Game 11
New Mexico	8
August 4 – Game 6
Texas West	13
Oklahoma	8
August 6 – Game 10
Arkansas	4
Texas West	8
Oklahoma	3
August 8 – Game 13
Louisiana	13
Texas West	19

=== West ===
The tournament took place in San Bernardino, California August 6–12.

State	City	LL Organization	Record
Arizona	Chandler	Chandler National	0–2
Hawaii	Hilo	Hilo	2–2
Nevada	Las Vegas	Summerlin South	0–2
Northern California	San Ramon	Canyon Creek	1–2
Southern California	Rancho Santa Margarita	Santa Margarita	4–0
Utah	St. George	Dixie	3–2

August 7 – Game 3
Utah	5
August 6 – Game 1
Hawaii	14
Arizona	1
August 10 – Game 8
Hawaii	2
Hawaii	8
August 6 – Game 2
Southern California	12
Nevada	2
August 7 – Game 4
Southern California	7
Northern California	2
Southern California	3
August 12 – Championship
Southern California	11
August 8 – Game 5
Utah	7
Arizona	2
August 9 – Game 7
Northern California	5
Northern California	11
August 8 – Game 6
Utah	13
Nevada	5
August 11 – Game 9
Utah	8
Hawaii	6
Utah	12

== International ==
=== Asia-Pacific and Middle East ===
The tournament took place in South Korea July 1–7.

Pool A
Country	Record
Hong Kong	3–1
Guam	2–2
Saudi Arabia	2–2
Thailand	2–2
Northern Mariana Islands	1–3

Pool B
Country	Record
South Korea	3–0
Chinese Taipei^{1}	2–1
Philippines	1–2
Indonesia	0–3

^{1} Republic of China, commonly known as Taiwan, due to complicated relations with People's Republic of China, is recognized by the name Chinese Taipei by majority of international organizations including Little League Baseball (LLB). For more information, please see Cross-Strait relations.

Semi-finals
July 6 – Seoul (F/4)
2B Chinese Taipei	10
1A Hong Kong	0
July 6 – Seoul
2A Guam	0
1B South Korea	4

Asia-Pacific and Middle East Championship
July 7 – Seoul
2B Chinese Taipei	1
1B South Korea	6

=== Australia ===
The tournament began in Lismore, New South Wales on June 7. The top two teams in each pool advanced to the elimination round. Following pool play, the elimination round was scheduled to begin on June 10, however due to constant inclement weather conditions, the Australian Baseball Federation announced on June 12 that the remainder of the tournament was postponed until officials could determine a resolution. It was decided that the tournament would be completed on July 8 and July 9 in Sydney.

Pool A
State/Territory	LL Organization	Record
New South Wales	MacArthur	3–1
Victoria	Southern Mariners	3–1
Western Australia	Perth Metro North	2–2
Queensland	Brisbane South	1–3
New South Wales	Illawarra	1–3

Pool C
State/Territory	LL Organization	Record
New South Wales	Cronulla	4–0
Victoria	Eastern Athletics	2–2
Queensland	Brisbane North	2–2
South Australia	Adelaide Marlins	2–2
Western Australia	Perth Metro East	0–4

Pool B
State/Territory	LL Organization	Record
Western Australia	Swan Hills	3–1
New South Wales	Manly	3–1
Australian Capital Territory	Canberra	2–2
Queensland	Brisbane Metro	1–3
Victoria	Northern Diamondbacks	1–3

Pool D
State/Territory	LL Organization	Record
New South Wales	Hills	4–0
New South Wales	Ryde North	2–2
South Australia	Adelaide Rays	2–2
Queensland	Gold Coast Pirates	1–3
Western Australia	Perth Metro Central	1–3

Quarter-finals
July 8 – Sydney
1B (Western Australia) Swan Hills	11
2C (Victoria (state)) Eastern Athletics	3
July 8 – Sydney
1A (New South Wales) MacArthur	11
2D (New South Wales) Ryde North	4
July 8 – Sydney
1C (New South Wales) Cronulla	5
2B (New South Wales) Manly	6
July 8 – Sydney
1D (New South Wales) Hills	9
2A (Victoria (state)) Southern Mariners	3

Semi-finals
July 8 – Sydney
1B (Western Australia) Swan Hills	8
1A (New South Wales) MacArthur	0
July 8 – Sydney
2B (New South Wales) Manly	1
1D (New South Wales) Hills	7

Australia Championship
July 9 – Sydney
1B (Western Australia) Swan Hills	4
1D (New South Wales) Hills	8

=== Canada ===
The tournament took place in Medicine Hat, Alberta August 3–12.

Pos	Team	Pld	W	L	RF	RA	RD	PCT	Qualification	(British Columbia)	(Ontario)	(Quebec)	(Alberta)	(Alberta) (H)	(Nova Scotia)	(Saskatchewan)
1	(British Columbia) White Rock South Surrey	6	6	0	96	23	+73	1.000	Advance to Semifinals	—	23–4	6–5	12–2	13–2	15–6	27–4
2	(Ontario) Port Arthur National	6	5	1	63	33	+30	.833	Advance to Semifinals	4–23	—	9–4	12–1	14–4	11–0	13–1
3	(Quebec) Diamond Baseball Academy	6	4	2	67	27	+40	.667	Advance to Semifinals	5–6	4–9	—	4–2	18–3	14–7	22–0
4	(Alberta) Lethbridge Southwest	6	3	3	33	39	−6	.500	Advance to Semifinals	2–12	1–12	2–4	—	11–10	7–1	10–0
5	(Alberta) Medicine Hat (H)	6	2	4	45	63	−18	.333		2–13	4–14	3–18	10–11	—	12–2	14–5
6	(Nova Scotia) Glace Bay	6	1	5	26	59	−33	.167		6–15	0–11	7–14	1–7	2–12	—	10–0
7	(Saskatchewan) Kiwanis National	6	0	6	10	96	−86	.000		4–27	1–13	0–22	0–10	5–14	0–10	—

(H) Hosts

Semifinals
3	Quebec	8
2	Ontario	5
4	Alberta	0
1	British Columbia	6

Canada Championship
3	Quebec	5
1	British Columbia	12

=== Caribbean ===
The tournament took place in St. John's, Antigua and Barbuda July 8–13.

Pool A
Country	City	Organization	Record
Aruba			2–1
Dominican Republic	Santiago de los Caballeros	Los Bravos de Pontezuela	2–1
U.S. Virgin Islands	St. Thomas		1–2
Bahamas			1–2

Pool B
Country	City	Organization	Record
Puerto Rico	Carolina	Roberto Clemente LL	3–0
Curaçao	Willemstad	Pariba LL	2–1
Sint Maarten			1–2
Antigua & Barbuda	Saint Johns	Antigua LL	0–3

Semi-finals
July 12 – St. John's
2B Curaçao	4
1A Aruba	7
July 12 – St. John's
2A Dominican Republic	5
1B Puerto Rico	4

Caribbean Championship
July 13 – St. John's
1A Aruba	4
2A Dominican Republic	8

=== Europe and Africa ===
The tournament took place in Kutno, Poland July 17–25.

Teams
Country	City	LL Organization	Record
Austria	Vienna	East Austria	1–2
Belarus	Skidzyelʹ	Sugar Storm	2–2
Belgium	Hasselt	Flanders West	1–2
Croatia	Zagreb	Croatia North	2–2
Czech Republic	Brno	South Czech Republic	2–2
(United States) Germany-US	Ramstein AB	KMC American	1–2
Hungary	Budapest	Central/Eastern	0–2
Italy	Emilia	Emilia	5–0
Netherlands	The Hague	Den Haag	3–2
Poland	Wodzisław Śląski	Zory/Jastrzebie/Rybnik	0–2
Romania	Călărași	CSS Călărași	0–2
Spain	Barcelona	Catalunya	4–2
United Kingdom	London	London Youth Baseball	5–2
Ukraine	Rivne	Rivne	0–2

Results
July 17
Game	Visitor	Score	Home
1	Romania (0–1)	4–5	Italy (1–0)
2	Poland (0–1)	0–10	Croatia (1–0)
3	Spain (1–0)	15–3	Netherlands (0–1)
4	Hungary (0–1)	3–14	Belarus (1–0)
July 18
Game	Visitor	Score	Home
5	Belgium (0–1)	6–9	Austria (1–0)
6	Ukraine (0–1)	2–16	United Kingdom (1–0)
7	(United States) Germany-USA (0–1)	1–9	Italy (2–0)
8	Czech Republic (1–0)	12–0	Croatia (1–1)
July 19
Game	Visitor	Score	Home
9	Austria (1–1)	2–6	Belarus (2–0)
10	Spain (1–1)	2–3	United Kingdom (2–0)
11	Belgium (1–1)	12–8	Hungary (0–2)
12	Netherlands (1–1)	13–0	Poland (0–2)
July 20
Game	Visitor	Score	Home
13	Ukraine (0–2)	4–5	(United States) Germany-USA (1–1)
14	Romania (0–2)	0–7	Croatia (2–1)
15	Belgium (1–2)	0–10	Spain (2–1)
16	Austria (1–2)	0–9	Netherlands (2–1)
July 21
Game	Visitor	Score	Home
17	Italy (3–0)	11–2	United Kingdom (2–1)
18	Czech Republic (2–0)	22–1	Belarus (2–1)
19	(United States) Germany-USA (1–2)	1–2	Spain (3–1)
20	Netherlands (3–1)	12–11	Croatia (2–2)
July 22
Game	Visitor	Score	Home
21	Spain (4–1)	18–2	Belarus (2–2)
22	United Kingdom (3–1)	8–5	Netherlands (3–2)
23	Czech Republic (2–1)	0–10	Italy (4–0)
July 23
Game	Visitor	Score	Home
24	Spain (4–2)	0–6	United Kingdom (4–1)
July 24
Game	Visitor	Score	Home
25	United Kingdom (5–1)	19–4	Czech Republic (2–2)
July 25
Game	Visitor	Score	Home
26	Italy (5–0)	12–2	United Kingdom (5–2)

=== Japan ===
The tournament took place in Tokyo July 21–23.

Participating teams	Prefecture	City	LL Organization
Chūgoku Champions	Hiroshima	Hiroshima	Hiroshima Nishi
Higashikanto Champions	Chiba	Chiba	Chiba City
Hokkaido Champions	Hokkaido	Sapporo	Sapporo Toyohira
Kanagawa Champions	Kanagawa	Hiratsuka	Hiratsuka
Kansai Champions	Osaka	Osaka	Osaka Namihaya
Kansai Runner-Up	Osaka	Osaka	Osaka Minami
Kitakanto Champions	Saitama	Ōmiya city	Ōmiya Higashi
Kyushu Champions	Nagasaki	Nagasaki	Nagasaki Minami
Shikoku Champions	Ehime	Matsuyama	Matsuyama
Shin'etsu Champions	Nagano	Nagano	Nagano Higashi
Tōhoku Champions	Miyagi	Sendai	Sendai Hirose
Tōhoku Runner-Up	Aomori	Hachinohe	Hachinohe
Tōkai Champions	Gifu	Tajimi	Gifu Tohno
Tōkai Runner-Up	Shizuoka	Fuji	Fuji
Tokyo Champions	Tokyo	Tokyo	Tokyo Nakano
Tokyo Runner-Up	Tokyo	Tokyo	Tokyo Kitasuna

Opening Round
July 22 – Tokyo (F/4)
Tokyo Kitasuna	12
(Hiroshima Prefecture) Hiroshima Nishi	1
July 22 – Tokyo
(Nagano Prefecture) Nagano Higashi	8
(Gifu Prefecture) Gifu Tohno	12
July 22 – Tokyo
(Saitama Prefecture) Ōmiya Higashi	4
(Aomori Prefecture) Hachinohe	3
July 22 – Tokyo
(Osaka Prefecture) Osaka Namihaya	3
(Nagasaki Prefecture) Nagasaki Minami	0
July 22 – Tokyo
(Chiba Prefecture) Chiba City	13
(Ehime Prefecture) Matsuyama	9
July 22 – Tokyo (F/5)
(Hokkaido) Sapporo Toyohira	0
Tokyo Nakano	11
July 22 – Tokyo
(Kanagawa Prefecture) Hiratsuka	5
(Osaka Prefecture) Osaka Minami	7
July 22 – Tokyo
(Miyagi Prefecture) Sendai Hirose	5
(Shizuoka Prefecture) Fuji	7

Quarterfinals
July 22 – Tokyo
Tokyo Kitasuna	16
(Gifu Prefecture) Gifu Tohno	2
July 22 – Tokyo
(Saitama Prefecture) Ōmiya Higashi	0
(Osaka Prefecture) Osaka Namihaya	19
July 22 – Tokyo
(Chiba Prefecture) Chiba City	11
Tokyo Nakano	2
July 22 – Tokyo (F/4)
(Osaka Prefecture) Osaka Minami	2
(Shizuoka Prefecture) Fuji	13

Semifinals
July 23 – Tokyo
Tokyo Kitasuna	8
(Osaka Prefecture) Osaka Namihaya	3
July 23 – Tokyo (F/5)
(Chiba Prefecture) Chiba City	15
(Shizuoka Prefecture) Fuji	3

Championship
July 23 – Tokyo (F/4)
Tokyo Kitasuna	17
(Chiba Prefecture) Chiba City	0

=== Latin America ===
The tournament took place in Barranquilla, Colombia July 15–22.

Country	City	LL Organization	Record
Venezuela	Maracaibo	Luz-Maracaibo	7–0
Panama	Aguadulce	Aguadulce Cabezera	5–1
Colombia	Cartagena	Falcón	4–3
Guatemala	Guatemala City	Liga Pequeña Javier de Baseball	3–3
Peru	Lima	AELU/Pueblo Libre	2–4
Colombia	Barranquilla	Willard	1–5
Argentina	Buenos Aires	Pequeñas Ligas Argentina	0–6

Semi-finals
July 21 – Barranquilla
4 Guatemala	4
1 Venezuela	11
July 21 – Barranquilla
3 Colombia	4
2 Panama	3

Latin America Championship
July 22 – Barranquilla
1 Venezuela	8
3 Colombia	0

=== Mexico ===
The tournament took place in Sabinas, Coahuila July 15–21.

Pool A
State	City	LL Organization	Record
Tamaulipas	Reynosa	Guadalupe Treviño Kelly	5–0
Nuevo León	Guadalupe	Guadalupe Linda Vista	3–2
Baja California	Mexicali	Félix Arce	3–2
Chihuahua	Ciudad Juárez	Satélite	2–3
Mexican Federal District	Mexico City	Petrolera de Beisbol A.C.	1–4
Coahuila	Sabinas	Juvenil De Sabinas	1–4

Pool B
State	City	LL Organization	Record
Tamaulipas	Matamoros	Matamoros	5–1
Veracruz	Medellín	Infantil y Juvenil Veracruzana	5–1
Sonora	Guaymas	Guaymas Sector Pesca	4–2
Coahuila	Sabinas	5 Manantiales	3–3
Chihuahua	Ciudad Juárez	El Granjero	2–4
Nuevo León	Guadalupe	Epitacio Mala Torres	2–4
Jalisco	Tlaquepaque	SUTAJ Alfarera	0–6

Semi-finals
July 20 – Sabinas
2B (Veracruz) Veracruzana	5
1A (Tamaulipas) Treviño Kelly	7
July 20 – Sabinas
2A (Nuevo León) Linda Vista	1
1B (Tamaulipas) Matamoros	2

Mexico Championship
July 21 – Sabinas
1A (Tamaulipas) Treviño Kelly	3
1B (Tamaulipas) Matamoros	1
