= 2025 Little League World Series =

Baseball tournament for children aged 10 to 12 years old

Tournament details
- Dates: August 13–August 24
- Teams: 20

Final positions
- Champions: Tung-Yuan Little League, Taipei, Taiwan (Chinese Taipei)
- Runners-up: (United States) Summerlin South Little League, Las Vegas, Nevada

The 2025 Little League Baseball World Series was a youth baseball tournament that took place from August 13 to August 24 at the Little League headquarters complex in South Williamsport, Pennsylvania. Ten teams from the United States and ten teams from other countries competed in the 78th edition of the Little League World Series (LLWS). Tung-Yuan Little League from Chinese Taipei defeated Summerlin South Little League from Las Vegas, Nevada in the championship game by a score of 7–0, giving Chinese Taipei their first championship since 1996.

== Teams ==
Regional qualifying tournaments were held from February to August 2025.

United States		International	
Region	Team	Region	Team
Great Lakes	(Illinois) Clarendon Hills, Illinois; Clarendon Hills Little League	Asia-Pacific and Middle East	Taipei, Taiwan (Chinese Taipei)^{[a]} Tung-Yuan Little League
Metro	(Connecticut) Fairfield, Connecticut; Fairfield National Little League	Australia	(Australia) (Queensland) Brisbane, Queensland; Brisbane North Little League
Mid-Atlantic	(Pennsylvania) Upper Uwchlan Township, Pennsylvania; Glenmoore Eagle Little League	Canada	(Canada) (British Columbia) Vancouver, British Columbia; Little Mountain Little League
Midwest	(South Dakota) Sioux Falls, South Dakota; Sioux Falls Little League	Caribbean	Santa Cruz, Aruba; Aruba Center Little League
Mountain	(Nevada) Las Vegas, Nevada; Summerlin South Little League	Europe and Africa	Brno, Czech Republic; South Czech Republic Little League
New England	(Massachusetts) Braintree, Massachusetts; Braintree American Little League	Japan	(Japan) Tokyo, Japan; Joto Little League
Northwest	(Washington (state)) Bonney Lake, Washington; Bonney Lake/Sumner Little League	Latin America	(Venezuela) Barquisimeto, Venezuela; Cardenales Little League
Southeast	(South Carolina) Irmo, South Carolina; Irmo Little League	Mexico	(Mexico) (Chihuahua (state)) Chihuahua, Chihuahua; El Swing Perfecto Little League
Southwest	(Texas) Richmond, Texas; Lamar Little League	Panama	(Panama) Arraijan, Panamá Oeste; Vacamonte Little League
West	(Hawaii) Honolulu, Hawaii; Honolulu Little League	Puerto Rico	(Puerto Rico) Yabucoa, Puerto Rico; Juan A. Bibiloni Little League

^{a} Taiwan, due to complicated relations with People's Republic of China, is designated "Chinese Taipei" by international organizations including Little League Baseball (LLB). For more information, please see Cross-Strait relations.

== Results ==
The draw to determine the opening round pairings took place on June 11, 2025.

=== United States bracket ===
Upper round 1	Upper round 2	Upper round 3	Upper final	Final
August 15 – Game 10
August 13 – Game 2	(Washington (state)) Washington	3
August 18 – Game 22 (F/7)
Nevada	16	Nevada	5
Nevada	1
Illinois	1	August 14 – Game 6 (F/4)
South Carolina	0
Massachusetts	0
August 20 – Game 30
South Carolina	13
Nevada	3
August 15 – Game 12
Connecticut	7
August 13 – Game 4	Hawaii	1
August 18 – Game 24
Connecticut	1	Connecticut	5
Connecticut	13
Texas	0	August 14 – Game 8
South Dakota	1
South Dakota	2	August 23 – U.S. Championship
Pennsylvania	0	Connecticut	2
Nevada	8
Lower round 1	Lower round 2	Lower round 3	Lower round 4	Lower final
August 19 – Game 28
August 17 – Game 17	South Dakota	9	August 21 – Game 34
August 16 – Game 14	Washington	3	Washington	0	August 20 – Game 32 (F/7)	Nevada	5
Texas	3	Massachusetts	2	South Dakota	6	South Carolina	3
Massachusetts	7	August 19 – Game 26	South Carolina	7
August 17 – Game 19	South Carolina	3
August 16 – Game 16	Hawaii	9	Hawaii	0
Pennsylvania	2	Illinois	1
Illinois	3

=== International bracket ===
Upper round 1	Upper round 2	Upper round 3	Upper final	Final
August 15 – Game 9
August 13 – Game 1	Canada	0
August 18 – Game 21
Puerto Rico	0	Venezuela	4
Venezuela	4
Venezuela	5	August 14 – Game 5 (F/4)
Japan	0
Czech Republic	0
August 20 – Game 29
Japan	12
Venezuela	3
August 15 – Game 11
Chinese Taipei	7
August 13 – Game 3	Aruba	8
August 18 – Game 23
Panama	7	Panama	2
Aruba	0
Australia	2	August 14 – Game 7
Chinese Taipei	4
Chinese Taipei	3	August 23 – Int'l Championship
Mexico	0	Chinese Taipei	1
Aruba	0
Lower round 1	Lower round 2	Lower round 3	Lower round 4	Lower final
August 19 – Game 27
August 17 – Game 18 (F/5)	Aruba	6	August 21 – Game 33
August 16 – Game 13	Canada	12	Canada	1	August 20 – Game 31	Venezuela	1
Australia	5	Australia	0	Aruba	3	Aruba	3
Czech Republic	3	August 19 – Game 25	Japan	0
August 17 – Game 20	Japan	6
August 16 – Game 15	Panama	1	Mexico	0
Mexico	11	Mexico	2
Puerto Rico	5

Third place game
Connecticut	4
Aruba	2

Championship game
Nevada	0
Chinese Taipei	7

2025 Little League World Series Champions
Tung-Yuan Little League
Taipei, Taiwan

== Champions path ==
The Tung-Yuan LL reached the LLWS with a record of 6–1. In total, their record was 11–1, with their only loss coming from North Seoul B LL (from South Korea). It was the first time since 2015 that Tung-Yuan had appeared in a Little League World Series, Tung-Yuan's first win since 1972, and the first championship won by a Taiwanese team since 1996.

Round	Opposition	Result
Asia-Pacific Regional Tournament
Pool A	China	10–0
Pool A	Guam	14–0
Pool A	South Korea	4–5
Pool A	Hong Kong	11–0
Pool A	Saudi Arabia	13–1
Semi-Final	Philippines	10–0
Final	South Korea	2–0

== MLB Little League Classic ==
On August 18, 2024, it was announced that the eighth MLB Little League Classic would feature the New York Mets and the Seattle Mariners on August 17. The Mets defeated the Mariners, 7–3.
