= Little League World Series (Caribbean Region) =

Children's baseball tournament

Caribbean Little League Championship
- Most recent season or competition: 2026 Little League World Series qualification
- Formerly: Latin American Region (1957–2000)
- Sport: Baseball
- Founded: 2001; 25 years ago
- No. of teams: 15
- Country: 12
- Most recent champions: Los Nacionales Little League, Santiago, Dominican Republic
- Most titles: Pabao Little League, Willemstad, Curaçao (10)

The Caribbean Region is a region that competes in the Little League World Series. The Caribbean region was first given an automatic berth in 2001. Prior to 2001, Caribbean teams competed for a berth in the LLWS in the Latin American region.

A team from Curaçao won the first nine Caribbean championships, until 2010. Curaçao's Pabao Little League won the 2004 Little League World Series, the only title to date for a Caribbean team.

== Caribbean Region Countries ==
- Aruba
- Antigua and Barbuda
- Bahamas
- Bermuda
- Bonaire
- British Virgin Islands
- Cayman Islands
- Cuba
- Curaçao
- Dominican Republic
- Haiti
- Jamaica
- Puerto Rico
- Saint Martin
- Sint Maarten
- U.S. Virgin Islands

Following the 2021 LLWS, Cuba and Puerto Rico, plus the Latin American Region country of Panama, will take up two berths in the LLWS. Two of the three will send champions to the LLWS each year, while the third will compete in its normal region; the automatic berths will rotate annually. This scheme is part of a planned expansion of the LLWS from 16 to 20 teams that was originally scheduled to occur for 2021, but was delayed to 2022 due to COVID-19.

== Regional championship ==
The list below lists each country's participant in the Caribbean Little League Region Tournament. That year's winner is indicated in green.

| Year | Aruba | Antigua and Barbuda | (The Bahamas) Bahamas | Bermuda | Bonaire | British Virgin Islands | Cayman Islands | Cuba | Curaçao | Dominican Republic | Jamaica | Puerto Rico | Sint Maarten | (United States Virgin Islands) U.S. Virgin Islands | Host |
|---|---|---|---|---|---|---|---|---|---|---|---|---|---|---|---|
| 2001 | N/A; Aruba | DNQ | N/A; Bahamas | DNQ | DNQ | DNQ | DNQ | Joined in 2019 | Pariba LL; Willemstad | N/A; Dominican Republic | DNQ | N/A; Puerto Rico | N/A; Sint Maarten | N/A; U.S. Virgin Islands | None |
| 2002 | Aruba South LL; Sint Nicolaas | DNQ | DNQ | DNQ | Bonaire LL; Kralendijk | DNQ | DNQ | | Pariba LL; Willemstad | DNQ | DNQ | Adalberto Rodriguez LL; Cabo Rojo | St. Maarten LL; Philipsburg | Alvin McBean LL; St. Thomas | Elmo Plaskett LL (United States Virgin Islands) St. Croix |
| 2003 | Aruba Central LL; Santa Cruz | DNQ | Grand Bahamas Junior LL; Freeport | DNQ | DNQ | BVI Little League; Road Town | DNQ | | Pabao LL; Willemsted | Virgilio Jimenez LL; Santo Domingo | DNQ | Rosario Y. Cardona LL; Maunabo | St. Maarten LL; Phillipsburg | Elmo Plaskett LL; St. Croix | Wilfredo Ramirez LL (Puerto Rico) Mayaguez |
| 2004 | Aruba South LL; Sint Nicolaas | DNQ | Grand Bahamas Junior LL; Freeport | DNQ | Bonaire LL; Kralendijk | BVI Little League; Road Town | DNQ | | Pabao LL; Willemstad | Virgilio Jimenez LL; Santo Domingo | DNQ | Jose M. Rodriguez LL; Manatí | St. Maarten LL; Philipsburg | Elrod Hendricks LL; St. Thomas | Aruba North LL; Oranjestad |
| 2005 | Aruba North LL; Oranjestad | DNQ | DNQ | DNQ | Bonaire LL; Kralendijk | DNQ | DNQ | | Pabao LL; Willemstad | Antonio Irrizarry LL; Puerto Plata | DNQ | Tati Lugo LL; Yauco | St. Maarten LL; Philipsburg | Elrod Hendricks LL; St. Thomas | Elmo Plaskett LL (United States Virgin Islands) St. Croix |
| 2006 | Aruba North LL; Oranjestad | DNQ | Freedom Farm LL; Nassau | DNQ | Bonaire LL; Kralendijk | DNQ | DNQ | | Pabao LL; Willemstad | Antonio Concepcion LL; Moca | Bayside LL; Kingston | Juan A. Bibiloni LL; Yabucoa | St. Maarten LL; Philipsburg | Elrod Hendricks West LL; St. Thomas | Jaime Collazo LL (Puerto Rico) Vega Baja |
| 2007 | Aruba North LL; Oranjestad | DNQ | DNQ | DNQ | Bonaire LL; Kralendijk | DNQ | DNQ | | Pabao LL; Willemstad | DNQ | Bayside LL; Kingston | Tati Lugo LL; Yauco | St. Maarten LL; Philipsburg | Elrod Hendricks West LL; St. Thomas | Juan A. Bibiloni LL (Puerto Rico) Yabucoa |
| 2008 | Aruba North LL; Oranjestad | DNQ | DNQ | Bermuda Youth Athletic LL; Southside | DNQ | DNQ | DNQ | | Pabao LL; Willemstad | Los Bravos de Pontenzuela LL; Santiago | West Portland LL; Portland | Juan Antonio Bibiloni LL; Yabucoa | St. Maarten LL; Philipsburg | Elrod Hendricks West LL; St. Thomas | Bonaire LL; Kralendijk |
| 2009 | Aruba Central LL; Santa Cruz | DNQ | DNQ | Bermuda Youth Athletic LL; Southside | Bonaire LL; Kralendijk | DNQ | DNQ | | Pabao LL; Willemstad | Los Bravos de Pontenzuela LL; Santiago | DNQ | Radames Lopez LL; Guayama | St. Maarten LL; Philipsburg | Elmo Plaskett East LL; St. Croix | Willemstad LL (Curaçao) Willemstad |
| 2010 | Aruba North LL; Oranjestad | DNQ | DNQ | DNQ | Bonaire LL; Kralendijk | DNQ | Grand Cayman Island LL; George Town | | Pariba LL; Willemstad | Virgilio Jimenez LL; Santo Domingo | DNQ | Jose M. Rodriguez LL; Manatí | St. Maarten LL; Philipsburg | Elmo Plaskett East LL; St. Croix | Miguel Luzunaris LL (Puerto Rico) Humacao |
| 2011 | Aruba North LL, Oranjestad; Oranjestad | Antigua LL Saint John's | DNQ | DNQ | DNQ | DNQ | Cayman Islands LL; Grand Cayman Island | | Pariba LL; Willemstad | José Tatis LL; Puerto Plata | DNQ | Jose M. Rodriguez LL; Manatí | St. Maarten LL; Philipsburg | Elmo Plaskett East LL; St. Croix Elrod Hendricks West LL; St. Thomas | Alvin McBean LL (United States Virgin Islands) St. Thomas |
| 2012 | Aruba Central LL; Santa Cruz | Antigua LL; Saint John's | DNQ | DNQ | DNQ | DNQ | DNQ | | Pariba LL; Willemstad | Solano LL; San Pedro de Macorís | DNQ | Jose M. Rodriguez LL; Manatí | St. Maarten LL; Philipsburg | Elmo Plaskett East LL; St. Croix Elrod Hendricks West LL; St. Thomas | Radames Lopez LL (Puerto Rico) Guayama |
| 2013 | Aruba Center LL; Santa Cruz | DNQ | DNQ | DNQ | DNQ | DNQ | DNQ | | Pariba LL; Willemstad | DNQ | Jamaica LL | Samaritana LL; San Lorenzo | St. Maarten LL; Philipsburg | Elmo Plaskett East LL; St. Croix Elrod Hendricks West LL; St. Thomas | Bonaire LL; Kralendijk |
| 2014 | Aruba North LL; Oranjestad | DNQ | Freedom Farm LL; Nassau | DNQ | Bonaire LL; Kralendijk | DNQ | Cayman Islands LL; George Town | | Pabao LL; Willemstad | Hector Delgado LL; San Cristóbal | DNQ | Miguel Luzunaris LL; Humacao | DNQ | Elrod Hendrick West LL; St. Thomas | Grand Bahamas LL (The Bahamas) Freeport |
| 2015 | Aruba Center LL; Santa Cruz | DNQ | DNQ | DNQ | DNQ | DNQ | DNQ | | Pabao LL; Willemstad | Los Bravos de Pontezuela LL; Santiago de los Caballeros | DNQ | Roberto Rivera Miranda LL; Cayey | DNQ | Elrod Hendricks LL; St. Thomas | Pariba LL (Curaçao) Willemstad |
| 2016 | Aruba Center LL; Santa Cruz | DNQ | DNQ | DNQ | Bonaire LL; Kralendijk | DNQ | DNQ | | Pariba LL; Willemstad | La Javilla LL; Santo Domingo | DNQ | Roberto Clemente LL; Carolina | DNQ | Alvin McBean East LL; St. Thomas | Elmo Plaskett East LL (United States Virgin Islands) St. Croix |
| 2017 | Aruba North LL; Noord | Antigua LL; Saint John's | Unknown | DNQ | DNQ | DNQ | DNQ | | Pariba LL; Willemstad | Los Bravos de Pontezuela LL; Santiago de los Caballeros | DNQ | Unknown | Unknown | Unknown; St. Thomas | Antigua LL (Antigua and Barbuda) Saint John's |
| 2018 | Aruba Center LL; Santa Cruz | DNQ | Freedom Farm LL; Nassau | DNQ | DNQ | DNQ | DNQ | | Pabao LL; Willemstad | Los Bravos de Pontezuela LL; Santiago | DNQ | Radames Lopez LL; Guayama | DNQ | Elmo Plaskett LL; St. Thomas | Gino Vega LL (Puerto Rico) Sabana Grande |
| 2019 | Aruba South LL; San Nicolas | Antigua LL; Saint John | Junior Nassau LL; Nassau | DNQ | Bonaire LL; Bonaire | DNQ | DNQ | Havana LL; Havana | Pabao LL; Willemstad | La Javilla LL; Santo Domingo | DNQ | Pirates De Venezuela LL; San Juan | Sint Maarten LL; Sint Maarten | Elrod Hendricks West LL; St. Thomas | Pariba LL (Curaçao) Willemstad |
| 2022 | Aruba North LL; Oranjestad | DNQ | DNQ | DNQ | DNQ | DNQ | DNQ | Liga Santa Clara de Santa Clara LL; Santa Clara | Pabao LL; Willemstad | Bravos de Pontezuela LL; Santiago de los Caballeros | DNQ | AQ | DNQ | DNQ | None |
| 2022 | Aruba North LL; Oranjestad | DNQ | DNQ | DNQ | DNQ | DNQ | DNQ | Liga Santa Clara de Santa Clara LL; Santa Clara | Pariba LL; Willemstad | Eduardo Sosa LL; San Cristóbal | DNQ | AQ | DNQ | DNQ | None |
| 2023 | Aruba Center LL; Santa Cruz | DNQ | DNQ | DNQ | DNQ | DNQ | DNQ | AQ | Pabao LL; Willemstad | Prospectos Baseball Vegano LL; La Vega | DNQ | Radames López LL; Guayama | DNQ | Elrod Hendrick LL; St. Thomas | Juan A. Bibiloni LL (Puerto Rico) Yabucoa |
| 2024 | Aruba Center LL; Santa Cruz | DNQ | DNQ | DNQ | Bonaire LL; Kralendijk | DNQ | DNQ | AQ | Pabao LL; Willemstad | La Javilla LL; Santo Domingo | DNQ | AQ | Saint Maarten LL; Philipsburg | Elrod Hendricks West LL; St. Thomas | Pariba LL (Curaçao) Willemstad |
| 2025 | Aruba Center LL; Santa Cruz | DNQ | DNQ | DNQ | Bonaire LL; Kralendijk | DNQ | DNQ | La Lisa LL; Havana | Pabao LL; Willemstad | Bravos de Pontezuela LL; Santiago de los Caballeros | DNQ | AQ | Saint Maarten LL; Philipsburg | Elrod Hendricks West LL; St. Thomas | Pariba LL (Curaçao) Willemstad |
| 2026 | Aruba North LL; Oranjestad | DNQ | Freedom Farm LL; Nassau | DNQ | Bonaire LL; Kralendijk | DNQ | DNQ | DNQ | AQ | Los Nacionales LL; Santiago | DNQ | Juan Antonio Bibiloni LL; Yabucoa | DNQ | Elrod Hendricks West LL; St. Thomas | Gino Vega LL (Puerto Rico) Sabana Grande |

- (AQ) – Indicates that the country automatically qualified for that year's tournament.
- (DNQ) – Indicates that the country did not have a team qualify in that year's tournament other than being the host.

== LLWS results ==
As of the 2026 Little League World Series.

Since 2022, as part of a rotational schedule, regional tournament winners from Puerto Rico, Cuba and Curaçao gained direct entry into the LLWS tournament in some years. In the years they do not have direct entry into the tournament, they will qualify through the Caribbean regional tournament.

=== Caribbean Region ===
| Year | Champion | City | LLWS | Record |
|---|---|---|---|---|
| 2001 | Pariba LL | (Curaçao) Willemstad | Third place | 4–2 |
| 2002 | Pariba LL | (Curaçao) Willemstad | Third place | 4–2 |
| 2003 | Pabao LL | (Curaçao) Willemstad | Third place | 4–2 |
| 2004 | Pabao LL | (Curaçao) Willemstad | Champions | 6–0 |
| 2005 | Pabao LL | (Curaçao) Willemstad | Runner-up | 4–2 |
| 2006 | Pabao LL | (Curaçao) Willemstad | Group stage | 1–2 |
| 2007 | Pabao LL | (Curaçao) Willemstad | Fourth place | 3–3 |
| 2008 | Pabao LL | (Curaçao) Willemstad | Int'l semifinal | 2–2 |
| 2009 | Pabao LL | (Curaçao) Willemstad | Int'l semifinal | 3–1 |
| 2010 | Jose M. Rodriguez LL | (Puerto Rico) Manati | Group stage | 1–2 |
| 2011 | Aruba North LL | (Aruba) Oranjestad | Round 1 | 1–2 |
| 2012 | Pariba LL | (Curaçao) Willemstad | Round 3 | 2–2 |
| 2013 | Sanmaritana LL | (Puerto Rico) San Lorenzo | Round 2 | 1–2 |
| 2014 | Miguel Luzunaris LL | (Puerto Rico) Humacao | Round 2 | 1–2 |
| 2015 | Los Bravos de Pontezuela LL | (Dominican Republic) Santiago de los Caballeros | Round 1 | 1–2 |
| 2016 | Pariba LL | (Curaçao) Willemstad | Round 2 | 1–2 |
| 2017 | Los Bravos de Pontezuela LL | (Dominican Republic) Santiago de los Caballeros | Round 2 | 1–2 |
| 2018 | Radames Lopez LL | (Puerto Rico) Guayama | Int'l semifinal | 3–2 |
| 2019 | Pabao LL | (Curaçao) Willemstad | Runner-up | 5–2 |
| 2020 | Cancelled due to COVID-19 pandemic | | | |
| 2021 | No international participant | | | |
| 2022 | Pabao LL | (Curaçao) Willemstad | Runner-up | 6–2 |
| 2023 | Pabao LL | (Curaçao) Willemstad | Runner-up | 4–2 |
| 2024 | Aruba Central LL | (Aruba) Santa Cruz | Round 3 | 2–2 |
| 2025 | Aruba Central LL | (Aruba) Santa Cruz | Fourth place | 4–3 |
| 2026 | Los Nacionales LL | (Dominican Republic) Santiago | Round 1 | 0–2 |

=== Puerto Rico Region ===
| Year | Champion | City | LLWS | Record |
|---|---|---|---|---|
| 2022 | Amelia Guaynabo Baseball LL | (Puerto Rico) Guaynabo | Round 1 | 0–2 |
| 2023 | | | | |
| 2024 | Radames López LL | (Puerto Rico) Guayama | Round 1 | 0–2 |
| 2025 | Juan A. Bibiloni LL | (Puerto Rico) Yabucoa | Round 1 | 0–2 |
| 2026 | | | | |

=== Cuba Region ===
| Year | Champion | City | LLWS | Record |
|---|---|---|---|---|
| 2022 | | | | |
| 2023 | Bayamo LL | (Cuba) Bayamo | Round 2 | 1–2 |
| 2024 | Santa Clara LL | (Cuba) Santa Clara | Round 3 | 1–2 |
| 2025 | | | | |
| 2026 | | | | |

=== Curaçao Region ===
| Year | Champion | City | LLWS | Record |
|---|---|---|---|---|
| 2026 | Pariba LL | (Curaçao) Willemstad | Champions | 5–0 |

=== Results by country ===
As of the 2026 Little League World Series.

| Country | Caribbean Championships | LLWS Championships | Record in LLWS | PCT |
|---|---|---|---|---|
| Curaçao | 14 | 2 | 54–26 | .675 |
| Puerto Rico | 4 | 0 | 6–14 | .300 |
| Aruba | 3 | 0 | 7–7 | .500 |
| Dominican Republic | 3 | 0 | 2–6 | .250 |
| Cuba | 0 | 0 | 2–4 | .333 |
| Total | 24 | 1 | 71–57 | .555 |

== See also ==
- Baseball awards#Americas
- Little League World Series in Latin America
- Little League World Series in Mexico

Caribbean Region in other Little League divisions

- Intermediate League – Latin America
- Junior League – Latin America
- Senior League – Caribbean
- Senior League – Latin America
- Big League – Latin America
