= 2024 Little League World Series =

Baseball tournament for children aged 10 to 12 years old

Tournament details
- Dates: August 14–25
- Teams: 20

Final positions
- Champions: (United States) Lake Mary Little League, Lake Mary, Florida
- Runners-up: Kuei-Shan Little League, Taoyuan, Taiwan

The 2024 Little League World Series was a youth baseball tournament that started on August 14 and ended on August 25 at the Little League headquarters complex in South Williamsport, Pennsylvania. Ten teams from the United States and ten teams from other countries competed in the 77th edition of the Little League World Series (LLWS). Lake Mary Little League of Lake Mary, Florida, defeated Kuei-Shan Little League of Taoyuan, Taiwan in the championship game by a 2–1 score after eight innings. The championship was won in walk-off fashion as the result of a bunt play. The victory was the first-ever LLWS championship for a team from Florida. Previously, teams from Florida had lost in eight championship game appearances. Florida also set the record for the most number of wins in a single LLWS tournament with seven.

== Teams ==
Regional qualifying tournaments were held from February to August 2024.

United States		International	
Region	Team	Region	Team
Great Lakes	(Illinois) Hinsdale, Illinois; Hinsdale Little League	Asia-Pacific and Middle East	Taoyuan, Taiwan (Chinese Taipei)^{[a]} Kuei-Shan Little League
Metro	(New York (state)) Staten Island, New York; South Shore Little League	Australia	(Australia) (New South Wales) Sydney, New South Wales; Hills Little League
Mid-Atlantic	(Pennsylvania) Newtown, Pennsylvania; Council Rock Newtown Little League	Canada	(Canada) (British Columbia) Surrey, British Columbia; Whalley Little League
Midwest	(South Dakota) Sioux Falls, South Dakota; Sioux Falls Little League	Caribbean	Santa Cruz, Aruba; Aruba Central Little League
Mountain	(Nevada) Henderson, Nevada; Paseo Verde Little League	Cuba	(Cuba) Santa Clara, Villa Clara; Santa Clara Little League
New England	Salem, New Hampshire; Salem Little League	Europe and Africa	Brno, Czech Republic; South Czech Republic Little League
Northwest	(Washington (state)) Puyallup, Washington; South Hill Little League	Japan	(Japan) (Tokyo) Tokyo; Johoku Little League
Southeast	(Florida) Lake Mary, Florida; Lake Mary Little League	Latin America	(Venezuela) Barquisimeto, Venezuela; Cardenales Little League
Southwest	(Texas) Boerne, Texas; Boerne Little League	Mexico	(Mexico) (Tamaulipas) Matamoros, Tamaulipas; Matamoros Little League
West	(Hawaii) Wailuku, Hawaii; Central East Maui Little League	Puerto Rico	(Puerto Rico) Guayama, Puerto Rico; Radames López Little League

^{a} Republic of China, commonly known as Taiwan, due to complicated relations with People's Republic of China, is recognized by the name Chinese Taipei by majority of international organizations including Little League Baseball (LLB). For more information, please see Cross-Strait relations.

== Results ==
The draw to determine the opening round pairings took place on June 12, 2024.

=== United States bracket ===
Upper round 1	Upper round 2	Upper round 3	Upper final	Final
August 16 – Game 10
August 14 – Game 2	Illinois	0
August 19 – Game 22
New Hampshire	1	Hawaii	5
Hawaii	2
Hawaii	3	August 15 – Game 6
Nevada	3
(New York (state)) New York	1
August 21 – Game 30
Nevada	9
Nevada	2
August 16 – Game 12
Texas	5
August 14 – Game 4	(Washington (state)) Washington	1
August 19 – Game 24
Florida	2	Florida	6
Florida	1
South Dakota	1	August 15 – Game 8
Texas	4
Texas	9	August 24 – U.S. Championship
Pennsylvania	0	Texas	7
Florida	10
Lower round 1	Lower round 2	Lower round 3	Lower round 4	Lower final
August 20 – Game 28
August 18 – Game 17	Florida	6	August 22 – Game 34
August 17 – Game 14	Illinois	0	New York	1	August 21 – Game 32	Nevada	3
South Dakota	3	New York	4	Florida	4	Florida	6
New York	6	August 20 – Game 26	Hawaii	3
August 18 – Game 19 (F/4)	Hawaii	3
August 17 – Game 16	Washington	2	Pennsylvania	1
Pennsylvania	5	Pennsylvania	12
New Hampshire	0

=== International bracket ===
Upper round 1	Upper round 2	Upper round 3	Upper final	Final
August 16 – Game 9 (F/4)
August 14 – Game 1	Venezuela	10
August 19 – Game 21
Aruba	0	Mexico	0
Venezuela	1
Mexico	2	August 15 – Game 5 (F/4)
Japan	2
Japan	11
August 21 – Game 29
Puerto Rico	0
Japan	1
August 16 – Game 11 (F/5)
Chinese Taipei	3
August 14 – Game 3	Australia	0
August 19 – Game 23
Chinese Taipei	8	Chinese Taipei	11
Chinese Taipei	10
Canada	0	August 15 – Game 7
Cuba	2
Cuba	4	August 24 – Int'l Championship
Czech Republic	1	Chinese Taipei	4
Venezuela	1
Lower round 1	Lower round 2	Lower round 3	Lower round 4	Lower final
August 20 – Game 27
August 18 – Game 18	Cuba	4	August 22 – Game 33
August 17 – Game 13	Mexico	8	Mexico	6	August 21 – Game 31	Japan	2
Canada	12	Canada	0	Mexico	3	Venezuela	3
Puerto Rico	5	August 20 – Game 25	Venezuela	11
August 18 – Game 20 (F/4)	Venezuela	2
August 17 – Game 15	Australia	0	Aruba	1
Czech Republic	3	Aruba	11
Aruba	8

Third place game
Texas	3
Venezuela	4

Championship game
Chinese Taipei	1
Florida (F/8)	2

2024 Little League World Series Champions
Lake Mary Little League
Lake Mary, Florida

== Champions path ==
The Lake Mary LL reached the LLWS with a record of 13–0. In total, their record was 20–1, with their only loss coming from Boerne LL (from Texas).

Round	Opposition	Result
Florida State Tournament
Pool A	Sarasota American LL	17–0 (F/3)
Pool A	Miami Springs LL	4–2
Pool A	Boca Raton LL	6–2 (F/8)
Championship	Charies/Capitola LL	8–1
Southeast Regional Tournament
First round	(South Carolina) Irmo LL	5–3
Winner's bracket semi-final	(North Carolina) Greenvile Tar Heel LL	11–4
Winner's bracket final	(Tennessee) Goodlettsville LL	8–1
Championship	(Tennessee) Goodlettsville LL	11–0 (F/4)

== MLB Little League Classic ==
On August 20, 2023, it was announced that the seventh MLB Little League Classic would feature the New York Yankees and the Detroit Tigers on August 18, 2024. The Tigers defeated the Yankees, 3–2, in 10 innings.
