= 2023 Little League World Series =

Baseball tournament for children aged 10 to 12 years old

Tournament details
- Dates: August 16 – August 27
- Teams: 20

Final positions
- Champions: (United States) El Segundo Little League El Segundo, California
- Runners-up: (Curaçao) Pabao Little League, Willemstad, Curacao

The 2023 Little League World Series was a youth baseball tournament taking place from August 16 to August 27 at the Little League headquarters complex in South Williamsport, Pennsylvania. Ten teams from the United States and ten teams from other countries are competing in the 76th edition of the Little League World Series (LLWS). El Segundo Little League of El Segundo, California, defeated Pabao Little League of Willemstad, Curaçao, in the championship game by a 6–5 score on a walk-off home run by Louis Lappe. It was the first championship for a team from California since 2011, and 8th overall, the most of any US state.

== Teams ==
Regional qualifying tournaments were held from February to August 2023. A team from North Dakota and Cuba participated in a Little League World Series tournament for the first time ever.

United States		International	
Region	Team	Region	Team
Great Lakes	(Ohio) New Albany, Ohio; New Albany Little League	Asia-Pacific and Middle East	Taoyuan, Taiwan (Chinese Taipei)^{[a]} Kuei-Shan Little League
Metro	(Rhode Island) Smithfield, Rhode Island; Smithfield Little League	Australia	(Australia) (New South Wales) Sydney; Hills Little League
Mid-Atlantic	(Pennsylvania) Media, Pennsylvania; Media Little League	Canada	(Canada) (Saskatchewan) Regina, Saskatchewan; North Regina Little League
Midwest	(North Dakota) Fargo, North Dakota; Fargo Little League	Caribbean	(Curaçao) Willemstad, Curaçao; Pabao Little League
Mountain	(Nevada) Henderson, Nevada; Henderson Little League	Cuba	(Cuba) Bayamo, Granma; Bayamo Little League
New England	(Maine) Gray, Maine; Gray New Gloucester Little League	Europe and Africa	Brno, Czech Republic; South Czech Republic Little League
Northwest	(Washington (state)) Seattle, Washington; Northeast Seattle Little League	Japan	(Japan) (Tokyo) Tokyo; Musashi Fuchu Little League
Southeast	(Tennessee) Nolensville, Tennessee; Nolensville Little League	Latin America	(Venezuela) Maracaibo, Venezuela; San Francisco Little League
Southwest	(Texas) Needville, Texas; Needville Little League	Mexico	(Mexico) Tijuana, Baja California; Municipal de Tijuana Little League
West	(California) El Segundo, California; El Segundo Little League	Panama	(Panama) (Veraguas Province) Santiago de Veraguas; Activo 20–30 Little League

^{a} Republic of China, commonly known as Taiwan, due to complicated relations with People's Republic of China, is recognized by the name Chinese Taipei by majority of international organizations including Little League Baseball (LLB). For more information, please see Cross-Strait relations.

== Results ==
The draw to determine the opening round pairings took place on June 6, 2023.

=== United States bracket ===
Upper round 1	Upper round 2	Upper round 3	Upper final	Final
August 18 – Game 10
August 16 – Game 2	Tennessee	8
August 21 – Game 22
Nevada	1	Rhode Island	1
Tennessee	2
Rhode Island	3	August 17 – Game 6 (F/4)
Washington	6
(Washington (state)) Washington	10
August 23 – Game 30 (F/9)
Maine	0
Washington	0
August 18 – Game 12
Texas	1
August 16 – Game 4	North Dakota	2
August 21 – Game 24
Texas	2	Texas	6
Texas	3
Pennsylvania	1	August 17 – Game 8 (F/4)
California	1
California	4	August 26 – U.S. Championship
Ohio	3	Texas	1
California	6
Lower round 1	Lower round 2	Lower round 3	Lower round 4	Lower final
August 22 – Game 28
August 20 – Game 18	California	9	August 24 – Game 34
August 19 – Game 14	Rhode Island	7	Rhode Island	3	August 23 – Game 32	Washington	1
Pennsylvania	5	Pennsylvania	2	California	5	California	2
Maine	3	August 22 – Game 26	Tennessee	3
August 20 – Game 20	Tennessee	2
August 19 – Game 16 (F/4)	North Dakota	1	Nevada	1
Nevada	13	Nevada	7
Ohio	2

=== International bracket ===
Upper round 1	Upper round 2	Upper round 3	Upper final	Final
August 18 – Game 9
August 16 – Game 1	Venezuela	4
August 21 – Game 21
Czech Republic	0	Panama	3
Venezuela	1
Panama	4	August 17 – Game 5
Curaçao	2
Curaçao	2
August 23 – Game 29
Australia	1
Curaçao	1
August 18 – Game 11
Chinese Taipei	9
August 16 – Game 3	Mexico	1
August 21 – Game 23 (F/4)
Japan	1	Japan	6
Japan	0
Cuba	0	August 17 – Game 7
Chinese Taipei	10
Canada	0	August 26 – Int'l Championship
Chinese Taipei	6	Chinese Taipei	0
Curaçao	2
Lower round 1	Lower round 2	Lower round 3	Lower round 4	Lower final
August 22 – Game 27
August 20 – Game 17	Japan	5	August 24 – Game 33
August 19 – Game 13 (F/5)	Panama	3	Panama	4	August 23 – Game 31	Curaçao	4
Cuba	11	Cuba	2	Japan	0	Mexico	2
Australia	1	August 22 – Game 25	Mexico	2
August 20 – Game 19	Venezuela	1
August 19 – Game 15	Canada	1	Mexico	3
Czech Republic	0	Mexico	10
Canada	3

Third place game
Texas (F/4)	0
Chinese Taipei	10

Championship game
Curaçao	5
California	6

2023 Little League World Series Champions
El Segundo Little League
El Segundo, California

== Champions path ==
Round	Opposition	Result
Southern California State Tournament
Winner's Bracket Quarterfinals	Fontana Community LL	7–0
Winner's Bracket Semi-finals	La Verne LL	9–0
Winner's Bracket Final	East Hills Yorba Linda Blue LL	10–0 (F/4)
Championship Series	Sherman Oaks Southern LL	3–4
Championship Series	Sherman Oaks Southern LL	3–2
West Regional Tournament
Winner's Bracket Semi-final	(California) Bollinger Canyon LL	4–3
Semi-final	(Hawaii) Hilo LL	6–0
Finals	(California) Bollinger Canyon LL	3–1

== MLB Little League Classic ==
On August 21, 2022, it was announced that the sixth MLB Little League Classic would feature the Philadelphia Phillies and the Washington Nationals on August 20. The Nationals defeated the Phillies, 4–3.
