= Little League World Series (Mountain Region) =

Region of the United States

Mountain Region
- Most recent season or competition: 2026 Little League World Series qualification
- Sport: Baseball
- Founded: 2022; 4 years ago
- No. of teams: 5
- Country: United States
- Most recent champion: Paseo Verde Little League Henderson, Nevada
- Most titles: Nevada (4) Paseo Verde Little League, Henderson, Nevada (2)
- Website: Little League Baseball Mountain Region

The Mountain Region is one of ten United States regions that currently send teams to the Little League World Series, the largest youth baseball competition in the world. The region was created in 2022 when the LLWS was expanded from 16 teams (eight U.S. teams and eight "International" teams from the rest of the world) to 20 teams (ten U.S. and ten International).

The Mountain Region is made up of five states.

- Colorado
- Montana
- Nevada
- Utah
- Wyoming

== Regional Championship ==
The list below lists each state's participant in the Mountain Little League Region Tournament. That year's winner is indicated in green.

=== 2022–2023 ===
Year	Montana	Nevada	Utah	Wyoming
2022	Boulder Arrowhead LL; Billings	Paseo Verde LL; Henderson	Snow Canyon LL; Santa Clara	Gillette LL; Gillette
2023	Boulder Arrowhead LL; Billings	Henderson LL; Henderson	Snow Canyon LL; Santa Clara	Torrington LL; Torrington

=== 2024–present ===
In December, 2023, it was announced that Colorado would be moved from the Southwest Region to the Mountain Region for the 2024 year and beyond.

Year	Colorado	Montana	Nevada	Utah	Wyoming
2024	North Boulder LL; Boulder	Boulder Arrowhead LL; Billings	Paseo Verde LL; Henderson	Dixie LL; St. George	Torrington LL; Torrington
2025	North Boulder LL; Boulder	Boulder Arrowhead LL; Billings	Summerlin South LL; Las Vegas	Lone Peak LL; Alpine	Torrington LL; Torrington
2026	Coal Creek LL; Lafayette	Billings Big Sky LL; Billings	Paseo Verde LL; Henderson	Lone Peak LL; Alpine	Laramie LL; Laramie

== LLWS results ==
As of the 2026 Little League World Series.

Year	Champion	City	LLWS	Record
2022	Snow Canyon LL	(Utah) Santa Clara	Round 2	0–2
2023	Henderson LL	(Nevada) Henderson	Round 3	2–2
2024	Paseo Verde LL	(Nevada) Henderson	US Semifinal	2–2
2025	Summerlin South LL	(Nevada) Las Vegas	Runner-up	5–2
2026	Paseo Verde LL	(Nevada) Henderson	Runner-up	4–1

=== Results by state ===
As of the 2026 Little League World Series.

State	Mountain Championships	LLWS Championships	Record in LLWS	PCT
Nevada	4	0	13–7	.650
Utah	1	0	0–2	.000
Colorado	0	0	0–0	–
Montana	0	0	0–0	–
Wyoming	0	0	0–0	–
Total	5	0	13–9	.591

== See also ==
- Little League World Series (Northwest Region)
- Little League World Series (West Region)
