= 2016 Little League World Series =

Children's baseball tournament

Coordinates: 41.23°N 76.98°W

Tournament details
- Dates: August 18–August 28
- Teams: 16

Final positions
- Champions: (United States) (New York (state)) Maine-Endwell Little League Maine-Endwell, New York
- Runners-up: East Seoul Little League Seoul, South Korea

The 2016 Little League World Series was held from August 18 to August 28 in South Williamsport, Pennsylvania. Eight teams from the United States and eight from throughout the world competed in the 70th edition of the Little League World Series. Maine-Endwell Little League of Maine-Endwell, New York, defeated East Seoul Little League of Seoul, South Korea, in the championship game by a 2–1 score. It was the first Little League World Series title for a team from the United States since 2011, and for the state of New York since 1964, and the third overall.

== Teams ==
Regional qualifying tournaments were held between June and August 2016.

United States	International
(Kentucky) Bowling Green, Kentucky; Great Lakes Region; Bowling Green Eastern Little League	(South Korea) Seoul, South Korea; Asia-Pacific and Middle East Region; East Seoul Little League
(New York (state)) Maine-Endwell, New York; Mid-Atlantic Region; Maine-Endwell Little League	Sydney, New South Wales; Australia Region; Hills Little League
(Iowa) Johnston, Iowa; Midwest Region; Johnston Little League	Vancouver, British Columbia; Canada Region; Hastings Community Little League
(Rhode Island) Warwick, Rhode Island; New England Region; Warwick North Little League	(Curaçao) Willemstad, Curaçao; Caribbean Region; Pariba Little League
(Oregon) Bend, Oregon; Northwest Region; Bend North Little League	(Italy) Emilia, Italy; Europe and Africa Region; Emilia Little League
(Tennessee) Goodlettsville, Tennessee; Southeast Region; Goodlettsville Baseball Little League	Tokyo; Japan Region; Chofu Little League
(Texas) San Antonio, Texas; Southwest Region; McAllister Park American Little League	(Panama) Aguadulce, Panama; Latin America Region; Aguadulce Cabezera Little League
(California) Chula Vista, California; West Region; Park View Little League	San Nicolás de los Garza, Nuevo León; Mexico Region; San Nicolás Little League

== Results ==
The draw to determine the opening round pairings took place on June 16, 2016.

=== United States bracket ===
Upper round 1	Upper round 2	Upper final	Final
August 18 – Game 2
(New York (state)) New York	7
August 22 – Game 14
Rhode Island	2
(New York (state)) New York	3
August 18 – Game 4
Tennessee	1
Oregon	2
August 24 – Game 24
Tennessee	3
(New York (state)) New York	13
August 19 – Game 6
Kentucky	10
California	1
August 22 – Game 16 (F/7)
Iowa	5
Iowa	4
August 19 – Game 8 (F/5)
Kentucky	14
Texas	1	August 27 – U.S. championship
Kentucky	11	(New York (state)) New York	4
Tennessee	2
Lower round 1	Lower round 2	Lower round 3	Lower final
August 23 – Game 18
August 20 – Game 10	Iowa	3	August 25 – Game 26
Rhode Island	8	Rhode Island	2	August 24 – Game 22 (F/5)	Kentucky	4
Oregon	0	Iowa	3	Tennessee	8
August 23 – Game 20 (F/7)	Tennessee	14
August 20 – Game 12	Tennessee	4
California	5	California	2
Texas	0

=== International bracket ===
Upper round 1	Upper round 2	Upper final	Final
August 18 – Game 1
Panama	10
August 22 – Game 13
Mexico	2
Panama	3
August 18 – Game 3
Australia	2
Australia	3
August 24 – Game 23
Italy	1
Panama	3
August 19 – Game 5
South Korea	2
Japan	4
August 22 – Game 15 (F/5)
Canada	10
Canada	0
August 19 – Game 7
South Korea	10
South Korea	3	August 27 – International championship
Curaçao	0	Panama	2
South Korea	7
Lower round 1	Lower round 2	Lower round 3	Lower final
August 23 – Game 17
August 20 – Game 9	Canada	1	August 25 – Game 25
Mexico	12	Mexico	7	August 24 – Game 21 (F/4)	South Korea	7
Italy	7	Mexico	10	Mexico	0
August 23 – Game 19	Australia	0
August 20 – Game 11	Australia	2
Japan	1	Curaçao	1
Curaçao	2

=== Crossover games ===
Teams that lost their first two games played a crossover game against a team from the other side of the bracket that also lost its first two games. These games were labeled Game A and Game B. This provided teams who were already eliminated the opportunity to play a third game.

Game A
August 22 – Lamade Stadium
Italy	2
Oregon	6

Game B
August 23 – Lamade Stadium
Japan	6
Texas	1

=== Third place game ===
This consolation game is played between the loser of the United States championship and the loser of the International championship.

Third place game
August 28 – Lamade Stadium
Tennessee	2
Panama	3

=== World Championship ===
Little League World Championship
August 28 – Lamade Stadium
South Korea	1
(New York (state)) New York	2

2016 Little League World Series Champions
Maine-Endwell Little League
Maine-Endwell, New York

== Home run count ==
Name	HR Count	Team
Zach McWilliams	4	Southeast
Seum Kwon	3	Asia-Pacific
Esmith Pineda	3	Latin America
Wontae Cho	2	Asia Pacific
Gael Cortez	2	Mexico
Ryan Harlost	2	Mid-Atlantic
Jaekyeong Kim	2	Asia-Pacific
Jose Leal	2	Mexico
Kenny Rix	2	New England
Jude Abbadessa	1	Mid-Atlantic
Donovan Antonia	1	Caribbean
Stephen Courtney	1	Australia
Kaiden Dinh	1	Midwest
J.T. Garcia	1	Midwest
Carlos Gonzalez	1	Latin America
Devin Hinojosa	1	West
So Hirao	1	Japan
Brent Iredale	1	Australia
Ethan Jackson	1	Southeast
Tanner Jones	1	Southeast
Tyler Jones	1	Southeast
Victor Juarez	1	Mexico
Moosung Kim	1	Asia-Pacific
Yoomin Lee	1	Asia-Pacific
Lucas Marrujo	1	West
R.J. Moore	1	Southeast
Carson Myers	1	Great Lakes
Devin Obee	1	Great Lakes
Jungtaek Ru	1	Asia-Pacific
Cristian Santarelli	1	Canada
Loreto Siniscalchi	1	Canada
Joaquin Tejada	1	Latin America
Dominic Tellis	1	Southwest

== Champions path ==
The Maine-Endwell Little League became only the third team from New York state to win the Little League World Series (the others were Schenectady in 1954 and Staten Island in 1964). The MELL reached the LLWS with an undefeated record of 19 wins and no losses; in total, their record was 24–0.

Round	Opposition	Result
Section 1 East
Winner's Bracket Quarterfinals	(New York (state)) Camden LL	10–0
Winner's Bracket Semifinals	(New York (state)) Auburn LL	18–1
Section 1 East Championship	(New York (state)) Fayetteville-Manlius LL	25–4
New York State Tournament
Opening Round	(New York (state)) Town of Wappinger LL	13–0 (5 inn.)
Winner's Bracket Semifinals	(New York (state)) Mid-Island LL	12–8
Winner's Bracket Final	(New York (state)) Pine Bush LL	5–3
New York State Championship	(New York (state)) Mid-Island LL	5–0
Mid-Atlantic Regional
Opening Round	(New Jersey) Freehold Township LL	8–6
Quarterfinals	(Delaware) Milton LL	1–0
Semifinals	(Washington, D.C.) Capitol City LL	8–2
Mid-Atlantic Region Championship	(Pennsylvania) Keystone LL	6–2

- Red indicates loss
- Green indicates win

== Notable players ==
Players Michael Mancini of New York (Vanderbilt) and Patrick Forbes of Kentucky (Louisville) played versus each other in NCAA D1 baseball tournament regional in 2025 after playing versus each other in the 2016 semifinal

- Leo Bernal (Panama) – Catcher for the St. Louis Cardinals
- Jurrangelo Cijntje (Curaçao) – switch pitcher, drafted by the Seattle Mariners in the first round of the 2024 Major League Baseball (MLB) draft.
- Patrick Forbes (Kentucky) - pitcher, drafted by the Arizona Diamondbacks in the first round of the 2025 MLB draft.
