= Little League World Series in Australia =

Australian under 12 baseball tournament

Australia Region
- Most recent season or competition: 2026 Little League World Series qualification
- Formerly: Asia-Pacific and Middle East Region (2007–2012)
- Sport: Baseball
- Founded: 2013; 13 years ago
- No. of teams: 12
- Country: Australia
- Most recent champions: Sydney Ryde Little League, New South Wales
- Most titles: Hills Little League, New South Wales (4)
- Website: Australian Little League

The Australia Region of Little League Baseball is a region designated for the Little League World Series. The division was founded in 2013 when Little League officially separated Australia from the Asia-Pacific region. This followed a period of explosive growth in youth baseball in the country; the first Little League-affiliated leagues in Australia were only established in 2007, but within five years, nearly 400 Little Leagues were operating, making Australia the largest country outside North America in Little League participation.

In the Little League World Series in 2013, a team from Perth, Western Australia qualified to represent Australia in its debut as a country. The team failed to win any of its three games at the LLWS. A year later another team from Perth would qualify and give the country their first win at the international tournament.

== Finals ==
- This table includes championship games contested prior to Australia's automatic berth into the Little League World Series.

Year	Host	Winner	Score	Runner-up
2008	Sheldon	Hills North LL	3–2	Adelaide Southern LL
2009	Benowa	Waverley LL	11–1 (F/4)	Adelaide Southern LL
2010	Benowa	Adelaide Southern LL	4–3	Ringwood District LL
2011	Benowa	Adelaide Southern LL	2–1	Perth Metro North LL
2012	Tallebudgera Valley	Perth Metro North LL	29–2 (F/4)	Yarra Rangers LL
2013	Tallebudgera Valley	Perth Metro Central LL	8–2	Adelaide South LL
2014	Tallebudgera Valley	Perth Metro North LL	3–2 (F/7)	Manly LL
2015	Lismore	Cronulla LL (Sydney)	7–3	Swan Hills LL (Perth)
2016	Lismore	Hills LL (Sydney)	8–2	Central Coast LL (Gosford)
2017	Sydney*	Hills LL (Sydney)	8–4	Swan Hills LL (Perth)
2018	Lismore	Gold Coast LL	11–0 (F/4)	Adelaide Seahawks LL
2019	Lismore	Cronulla LL (Sydney)	5–2	Ryde Red LL (North Ryde)
2020	Not held due to COVID-19 pandemic			
2021**	Lismore	Ryde Red LL (North Ryde)	5-1	Cronulla LL (Sydney)
2022	Macquarie Fields	Brisbane North LL	9–3	Hills LL (Sydney)
2023	Rooty Hill	Hills LL (Sydney)	3–2	Brisbane North LL
2024	Rooty Hill	Hills LL (Sydney)	16–3 (F/4)	Perth Metro Central LL
2025	Rooty Hill	Brisbane North LL	6–0	Ryde Red LL (North Ryde)
2026	Rooty Hill	Ryde Red LL (North Ryde)	9–3	Perth Metro Central LL

* Due to inclement weather, the elimination rounds of the 2017 tournament were moved from Lismore to Sydney.

** Due to the continued impact of the COVID-19 pandemic no international teams traveled to Williamsport in 2021. Also due to COVID-19-related restrictions in place concurrent with the Australian championship tournament, the Victoria qualifiers were not able to travel to the Australian championship tournament.

=== By state ===
State	First LLCR	Appearances	Championships	Runner-up
Australian Capital Territory	2009	17	0	0
New South Wales	2008	18	9	6
Northern Territory	2008	9	0	0
Queensland	2008	18	3	1
South Australia	2008	18	2	4
Victoria	2008	17	1	2
Western Australia	2008	18	3	5

== LLWS results ==
As of the 2026 Little League World Series.

Year	Champion	City	LLWS	Record
2013	Perth Metro Central LL	Perth	Round 1	0–3
2014	Perth Metro North LL	Perth	Round 2	1–2
2015	Cronulla LL	Sydney	Round 2	1–2
2016	Hills LL	Sydney	Round 3	2–2
2017	Hills LL	Sydney	Round 1	1–2
2018	Gold Coast LL	Gold Coast	Round 1	0–3
2019	Cronulla LL	Sydney	Round 1	0–3
2020	Cancelled due to COVID-19 pandemic			
2021	No international participant			
2022	Brisbane North LL	Brisbane	Round 1	0–2
2023	Hills LL	Sydney	Round 1	0–2
2024	Hills LL	Sydney	Round 2	0–2
2025	Brisbane North LL	Brisbane	Round 2	1–2
2026	Ryde Red LL	Sydney	Round 1	0–2

=== Results by state ===
As of the 2026 Little League World Series.

State	Australia Championships	LLWS Championships	Record in LLWS	PCT
New South Wales	7	0	4–15	.211
Queensland	3	0	1–7	.125
Western Australia	2	0	1–5	.167
Victoria	0	0	0–0	–
South Australia	0	0	0–0	–
Australian Capital Territory	0	0	0–0	–
Total	12	0	6–27	.182

== See also ==
- Baseball awards § Australia

Australia Region in other Little League divisions

- Intermediate League
- Junior League
- Senior League
