= Little League World Series (Great Lakes Region) =

Children's baseball tournament

Great Lakes Region
- Most recent season or competition: 2026 Little League World Series qualification
- Formerly: Central Region (1957–2000)
- Sport: Baseball
- Founded: 2000; 26 years ago
- No. of teams: 5
- Country: United States
- Most recent champions: West Side Little League, Hamilton, Ohio
- Most titles: Kentucky (8) Grosse Pointe Woods-Shores Little League, Grosse Pointe Woods, Michigan (3) Bowling Green Eastern Little League, Bowling Green, Kentucky (3) West Side Little League, Hamilton, Ohio (3)
- Website: Little League Baseball & Softball Central Region Headquarters

The Great Lakes Region is one of ten United States regions that currently sends teams to the Little League World Series, it is the largest youth baseball competition that is in the world. The region's participation in the LLWS dates back to 1957, when it was known as the Central Region. However, when the LLWS was expanded in 2001 from eight teams (four U.S. teams and four "International" teams from the rest of the world) to 16 teams (eight U.S. and eight International), the Central Region was split into the Great Lakes and Midwest Regions.

The Great Lakes Region has a unique definition that it does not correspond with the normally understood definition of the "Great Lakes" area, even when the context is restricted to the U.S. Although eight U.S. states (and the Canadian province of Ontario) border on the Great Lakes, only four of them are in Little League's Great Lakes Region:

- Illinois
- Indiana
- Michigan
- Ohio

One state that does not border any of the Great Lakes, and in fact has no territory within the Great Lakes watershed, is included in this region:

- Kentucky

Two other states that border on the Great Lakes, New York and Pennsylvania are in other regions; Pennsylvania plays in the Mid-Atlantic region, while New York plays in the Metro region. The remaining U.S. state that borders on the Great Lakes, Minnesota, is in the Midwest region. (The Canadian provinces that border the Great Lakes have their Little League champions participate in a nationwide tournament, with the winner representing Canada in the International bracket at the LLWS.)

Following the 2021 LLWS, Wisconsin has been moved over to the Midwest Region. This move coincides with a planned expansion of the LLWS from 16 to 20 teams. This expansion was originally scheduled to occur for 2021, but was delayed to 2022 due to the COVID-19 pandemic.

== Regional championship ==
The year's winner is indicated in green.

=== 2001–2021 ===
Year	Illinois	Indiana	Kentucky	Michigan	Ohio	Wisconsin
2001	Lansing East LL; Lansing	Brownsburg LL; Brownsburg	Owensboro Southern LL; Owensboro	Roosevelt Park LL; Roosevelt Park	Fairborn American LL; Fairborn	Appleton Kiwanis LL; Appleton
2002	Bradley-Bourbonnais American LL; Bourbonnais	Brownsburg LL; Brownsburg	Valley Sports American LL; Louisville	Grosse Pointe Farms-City LL; Grosse Pointe Farms	West Side American LL; Hamilton	Merrill LL; Merrill
2003	Moline National LL; Moline	Brooklyn LL; Anderson	Owensboro Southern LL; Owensboro	Midland Northeast LL; Midland	Tallmadge LL; Tallmadge	Wausau Western LL; Wausau
2004	Mundelein National LL; Mundelein	Highland LL; Highland	Owensboro Southern LL; Owensboro	Western LL; Grand Rapids	West Side National LL; Hamilton	Appleton Einstein LL; Appleton
2005	Limestone LL; Kankakee	Seymour LL; Seymour	Owensboro Southern LL; Owensboro	Western LL; Grand Rapids	Boardman Community East LL; Boardman	Lakeland National LL; Bristol
2006	Lemont LL; Lemont	New Castle LL; New Castle	Owensboro Southern LL; Owensboro	Union Township Kids LL; Mount Pleasant	West Side LL; Hamilton	Einstein LL; Appleton
2007	Western Springs LL; Western Springs	New Albany LL; New Albany	Warren County Southern LL; Bowling Green	Taylor Northwest LL; Taylor	West Side LL; Hamilton	Wausau Northern LL; Wausau
2008	Jackie Robinson LL; Chicago	Jeff/GRC American LL; Jeffersonville	Bowling Green Eastern LL; Bowling Green	Bay City Southwest LL; Bay City	Mount Vernon LL; Mount Vernon	Appleton Einstein LL; Appleton
2009	Jackie Robinson West LL; Chicago	Bartholomew County National LL; Columbus	Logan County/Russellville LL; Russellville	Grosse Pointe Farms-City LL; Grosse Pointe Farms	West Side LL; Hamilton	West Madison American LL; Madison
2010	Moline National LL; Moline	Terre Haute North LL; Terre Haute	Owensboro Southern LL; Owensboro	Richmond LL; Richmond	West Side LL; Hamilton	Burlington LL; Burlington
2011	Rock Falls LL; Rock Falls	Golfmoor LL; Evansville	North Oldham LL; La Grange	Grosse Pointe Park LL; Grosse Pointe Park	West Side LL; Hamilton	Burlington LL; Burlington
2012	Streator LL; Streator	New Castle LL; New Castle	Warren County Southern LL; Bowling Green	North Saginaw Township LL; Saginaw	West Side LL; Hamilton	Eau Claire National LL; Eau Claire
2013	Jackie Robinson West LL; Chicago	Hagerstown LL; Hagerstown	Knox County LL; Barbourville	Grosse Pointe Woods-Shores LL; Grosse Pointe Woods	West Side LL; Hamilton	Burlington LL; Burlington
2014	Jackie Robinson West LL; Chicago	New Albany LL; New Albany	Warren County Southern LL; Bowling Green	Midland Northeast LL; Midland	Canfield LL; Canfield	Burlington LL; Burlington
2015	Olney LL; Olney	New Albany LL; New Albany	Bowling Green Eastern LL; Bowling Green	Bay City Southwest LL; Bay City	West Side LL; Hamilton	Burlington LL; Burlington
2016	Streator LL; Streator	Terre Haute North LL; Terre Haute	Bowling Green Eastern LL; Bowling Green	Essexville-Hampton LL; Essexville	West Side LL; Hamilton	Little Leaguers of Kenosha American LL; Kenosha
2017	Hinsdale LL; Hinsdale	New Albany LL; New Albany	Lexington Eastern LL; Lexington	Grosse Pointe Woods-Shores LL; Grosse Pointe Woods	West Side LL; Hamilton	Wausau National LL; Wausau
2018	Tri-Cities LL; West Dundee	New Albany LL; New Albany	St. Matthews Baseball LL; St. Matthews	Grosse Pointe Woods-Shores LL; Grosse Pointe Woods	New Albany LL; New Albany	Wausau National LL; Wausau
2019	River Forest Youth LL; River Forest	Silver Creek LL; Sellersburg	Bowling Green Eastern LL; Bowling Green	Bay City Northwest LL; Bay City	West Side LL; Hamilton	Glendale LL; Glendale
2020	Not held due to COVID-19 pandemic					
2021	Hinsdale LL; Hinsdale	Brownsburg LL; Brownsburg	Warren County South LL; Bowling Green	Taylor North LL; Taylor	West Side LL; Hamilton	Elmbrook National LL; Elm Grove

=== 2022–present ===
Year	Illinois	Indiana	Kentucky	Michigan	Ohio
2022	Hinsdale LL; Hinsdale	Hagerstown LL; Hagerstown	North Laurel LL; London	Grosse Pointe Farms-City LL; Grosse Pointe Farms	West Side LL; Hamilton
2023	Elmhurst Youth Baseball LL; Elmhurst	Bedford LL; Bedford	Lexington Eastern LL; Lexington	Midland Northeast LL; Midland	New Albany LL; New Albany
2024	Hinsdale LL; Hinsdale	Jasper Youth Baseball LL; Jasper	Bowling Green East LL; Bowling Green	Tecumseh Area LL; Tecumseh	West Side LL; Hamilton
2025	Clarendon Hills LL; Clarendon Hills	Brownsburg LL; Brownsburg	Lexington Eastern LL; Lexington	Negaunee LL; Negaunee	West Side LL; Hamilton
2026	Burbank American LL; Burbank	Jasper National LL; Jasper	North Oldham LL; La Grange	Greater Bay LL; Bay City	West Side LL; Hamilton

== LLWS results ==
As of the 2026 Little League World Series.

Year	Champion	City	LLWS	Record
2001	Brownsburg LL	(Indiana) Brownsburg	US Semifinal	3–1
2002	Valley Sports American LL	(Kentucky) Louisville	Champions	6–0
2003	Tallmadge LL	(Ohio) Tallmadge	Group Stage	1–2
2004	Southern LL	(Kentucky) Owensboro	Group Stage	1–2
2005	Southern LL	(Kentucky) Owensboro	Group Stage	0–3
2006	Lemont LL	(Illinois) Lemont	US Semifinal	2–2
2007	West Side LL	(Ohio) Hamilton	Group Stage	1–2
2008	Jefferson/GRC American LL	(Indiana) Jeffersonville	Group Stage	0–3
2009	Logan County/Russellville LL	(Kentucky) Russellville	Group Stage	0–3
2010	West Side LL	(Ohio) Hamilton	Group Stage	1–2
2011	North Oldham LL	(Kentucky) La Grange	Round 2	1–2
2012	New Castle LL	(Indiana) New Castle	Round 2	1–2
2013	Grosse Pointe Woods-Shores LL	(Michigan) Grosse Pointe Woods	Round 1	0–3
2014	New Albany LL (Note: New Albany Little League of New Albany, Indiana was retroactively given the Great Lakes Region title when Jackie Robinson West Little League from Chicago was found to have fielded ineligible players.)	(Indiana) New Albany	–	–
2015	Bowling Green Eastern LL	(Kentucky) Bowling Green	Round 3	2–2
2016	Bowling Green Eastern LL	(Kentucky) Bowling Green	US Semifinal	2–2
2017	Grosse Pointe Woods-Shores LL	(Michigan) Grosse Pointe Woods	Round 1	1–2
2018	Grosse Pointe Woods-Shores LL	(Michigan) Grosse Pointe Woods	Round 3	2–2
2019	Bowling Green Eastern LL	(Kentucky) Bowling Green	Round 1	1–2
2020	LLWS not held due to COVID-19 pandemic			
2021 (Note: Due to the COVID-19 pandemic, Little League International did not invite teams from outside the U.S. to the LLWS in 2021. Instead, the top two teams in each U.S. region qualified.)	Taylor North LL	(Michigan) Taylor	Champions	5–1
2021	West Side LL	(Ohio) Hamilton	Runner-up	5–2
2022	Hagerstown LL	(Indiana) Hagerstown	Round 3	1–2
2023	New Albany LL	(Ohio) New Albany	Round 1	0–2
2024	Hinsdale LL	(Illinois) Hinsdale	Round 2	0–2
2025	Clarendon Hills LL	(Illinois) Clarendon Hills	Round 2	1–2
2026	West Side LL	(Ohio) Hamilton	Fourth place	5–3

=== Results by state ===
As of the 2026 Little League World Series. Italics denote the state is no longer a member of the Great Lakes Region.

State	Great Lakes Championships	LLWS Championships	Record in LLWS	PCT
Kentucky	8	1	13–16	.448
Ohio	5	0	13–13	.500
Indiana	5	0	5–8	.385
Michigan	4	1	8–8	.500
Illinois	3	0	3–6	.333
Wisconsin	0	0	0–0	–
Total	25	2	42–51	.452

== See also ==
- Little League World Series (Central Region)
- Little League World Series (Midwest Region)

Central Region in other Little League divisions

- Intermediate League
- Junior League
- Senior League
- Big League
