= 2013 Little League World Series qualification =

Children's baseball competition qualification

United States
- Great Lakes winner: Grosse Pointe Woods, Michigan
- Mid-Atlantic winner: Newark, Delaware
- Midwest winner: Urbandale, Iowa
- New England winner: Westport, Connecticut
- Northwest winner: (Washington (state)) Sammamish, Washington
- Southeast winner: Nashville, Tennessee
- Southwest winner: Corpus Christi, Texas
- West winner: Chula Vista, California

International
- Asia-Pacific and Middle East winner: Taoyuan, Chinese Taipei
- Australia winner: Perth, Western Australia
- Canada winner: (Canada) Nepean, Ontario
- Caribbean winner: San Lorenzo, Puerto Rico
- Europe and Africa winner: Brno, Czech Republic
- Japan winner: (Japan) Fuchū, Tokyo
- Latin America winner: Aguadulce, Panama
- Mexico winner: (Mexico) Tijuana, Baja California

Tournaments

Qualification for the 2013 Little League World Series took place in eight United States regions and eight international regions from June through August 2013.

== United States ==
=== Great Lakes ===
The tournament took place in Indianapolis, Indiana from August 3–10.

State	City	LL Organization	Record
Illinois	Chicago	Jackie Robinson West	4–0
Michigan	Grosse Pointe Woods	Grosse Pointe Woods-Shores	2–2
Ohio	Hamilton	West Side	2–2
Wisconsin	Burlington	Burlington	2–2
Indiana	Hagerstown	Hagerstown	1–3
Kentucky	Barbourville	Knox County	1–3

Semi-finals
August 8 - Indianapolis
4 Wisconsin	2
1 Illinois	12
August 8 - Indianapolis
3 Ohio	4
2 Michigan	5

Final
August 10 - Indianapolis
1 Illinois	3
2 Michigan	10

=== Mid-Atlantic ===
The tournament took place in Bristol, Connecticut from August 2–11.

State	City	LL Organization	Record
Pennsylvania	Lionville	Lionville	4–0
Delaware	Newark	Newark National	3–1
Washington, D.C.		Capitol City	2–2
Maryland	Berlin	Berlin	2–2
New York	Glenville	Burnt Hills Ballston Lake	1–3
New Jersey	Clarksboro	East Greenwich	0–4

Semi-finals
August 10 - Bristol
4 Maryland	3
1 Pennsylvania	9
August 10 - Bristol (F/4)
3 Washington, D.C.	4
2 Delaware	15

Final
August 11 - Bristol
1 Pennsylvania	2
2 Delaware	8

=== Midwest ===
The tournament took place in Indianapolis, Indiana from August 2–9.

Note: North Dakota and South Dakota are organized into a single Little League district.

State	City	LL Organization	Record
Minnesota	Coon Rapids	Coon Rapids Andover American	4–0
Nebraska	Kearney	Kearney	3–1
Iowa	Urbandale	Urbandale	3–1
South Dakota	Rapid City	Timberline	2–2
Missouri	Webb City	Webb City	0–4
Kansas	Girard	Girard	0–4

Semi-finals
August 7 - Indianapolis
1 Minnesota	4
4 South Dakota	0
August 7 - Indianapolis (F/11)
3 Iowa	4
2 Nebraska	3

Final
August 9 - Indianapolis
1 Minnesota	2
3 Iowa	3

=== New England ===
The tournament took place in Bristol, Connecticut from August 2–10.

State	City	LL Organization	Record
Connecticut	Westport	Westport	4–0
Vermont	South Burlington	South Burlington	3–1
Rhode Island	Lincoln	Lincoln	3–1
Maine	Saco	Saco/Maremont	1–3
Massachusetts	Newton	Newton SouthEast	1–3
New Hampshire	Rye	Rye	0–4

Semi-finals
August 8 - Bristol
1 Connecticut	3
4 Maine	0
August 8 - Bristol
3 Rhode Island	5
2 Vermont	2

Final
August 10 - Bristol
1 Connecticut	1
3 Rhode Island	0

=== Northwest ===
The tournament took place in San Bernardino, California from August 2–10.

State	City	LL Organization	Record
Washington	Sammamish	Eastlake	4–0
Oregon	Lake Oswego	Lake Oswego	3–1
Montana	Billings	Billings Big Sky	2–2
Idaho	Coeur d'Alene	Coeur d'Alene	2–2
Alaska	Anchorage	Abbott-O-Rabbit	1–3
Wyoming	Cody	Cody	0–4

Semi-finals
August 8 - San Bernardino
4 Idaho	4
1 Washington	5
August 8 - San Bernardino
3 Montana	3
2 Oregon	0

Final
August 10 - San Bernardino (F/4)
1 Washington	13
3 Montana	1

=== Southeast ===
The tournament took place in Warner Robins, Georgia from August 2–9.

Pool A
State	City	LL Organization	Record
Florida	Palm City	Martin County North	2–1
South Carolina	Taylors	Northwood	2–1
North Carolina	Charlotte	Myers Park/Trinity	1–2
Georgia	Columbus	Columbus Northern	1–2

Pool B
State	City	LL Organization	Record
Virginia	Henrico	Tuckahoe American	3–0
Tennessee	Nashville	South Nashville	2–1
West Virginia	Barboursville	Barboursville	1–2
Alabama	Jackson	Jackson	0–3

Semi-finals
Warner Robins - August 7
2B Tennessee	5
1A Florida	1
Warner Robins - August 7
2A South Carolina	6
1B Virginia	12

Final
Warner Robins - August 9
2B Tennessee	5
1B Virginia	3

=== Southwest ===
The tournament took place in Waco, Texas from August 2–7.

Pool A
State	City	LL Organization	Record
Texas West	Corpus Christi	Universal	3–0
Louisiana	Bossier City	Bossier National	2–1
Texas East	Pearland	Pearland Maroon	1–2
Mississippi	Ocean Springs	Ocean Springs	0–3

Pool B
State	City	LL Organization	Record
New Mexico	Las Cruces	Fairacres	3–0
Arkansas	Malvern	Malvern	2–1
Colorado	Boulder	North Boulder	1–2
Oklahoma	Tulsa	Tulsa	0–3

Semi-finals
August 6 - Waco
2B Arkansas	6
1A Texas West	10
August 6 - Waco
2A Louisiana	3
1B New Mexico	9

Final
August 7 - Waco
1A Texas West	6
1B New Mexico	0

=== West ===
The tournament took place in San Bernardino, California from August 2–10.

State	City	LL Organization	Record
Northern California	Belmont	Belmont-Redwood Shores	4–0
Southern California	Chula Vista	Eastlake	3–1
Nevada	Las Vegas	Mountain Ridge	3–1
Arizona	Chandler	Chandler National South	2–2
Hawaii	Wailuku	Central East Maui	0–4
Utah	St. George	Dixie	0–4

Semi-finals
August 9 - San Bernardino
4 Arizona	1
1 Northern California	8
August 9 - San Bernardino
3 Nevada	0
2 Southern California	12

Final
August 10 - San Bernardino
1 Northern California	0
2 Southern California	9

== International ==
=== Asia-Pacific and Middle East ===
The tournament took place in the Philippines from July 1–7.

Pool A
Country	City	LL Organization	Record
Chinese Taipei^{1}	Taoyuan	Chung-Ping	5–0
South Korea			4–1
Northern Mariana Islands	Saipan	Saipan	3–2
Thailand			2–3
Saudi Arabia	Dhahran	Arabian American	1–4
New Zealand	Auckland	Bayside Westhaven	0–5

Pool B
Country	City	LL Organization	Record
Indonesia	Jakarta	Indonesian	5–0
Hong Kong		Hong Kong	3–2
Singapore		Singapore	2–3
Philippines	Tanauan	Tanauan City	2–3
Guam			2–3
United Arab Emirates	Dubai	Dubai	1–4

Semi-finals
July 6 – Philippines
2B Hong Kong	3
1A Chinese Taipei	6
July 6 – Philippines
2A South Korea	14
1B Indonesia	2

Final
July 7 – Philippines
1A Chinese Taipei	11
2A South Korea	2

^{1} Republic of China, commonly known as Taiwan, due to complicated relations with People's Republic of China, is recognized by the name Chinese Taipei by majority of international organizations including Little League Baseball (LLB). For more information, please see Cross-Strait relations.

=== Australia ===
The tournament took place in Gold Coast, Queensland on June 1–5. The top two teams in each pool advance to the elimination round, where they are seeded one through eight based on overall record. The "runs against ratio" (RAR) is used as the tiebreaker. It is calculated by the number of runs scored against a team, divided by the number of defensive innings the team played.

Pool A
State/Territory	LL Organization	Record	RAR
Western Australia	Perth Central ^{(2)}	4–0	0.333
Western Australia	Swan Hills ^{(5)}	3–1	1.286
Australian Capital Territory	Canberra	2–2	1.200
New South Wales	Newcastle	1–3	1.650
Western Australia	Hedland	0–4	5.000

Pool C
State/Territory	LL Organization	Record	RAR
Victoria	Yarra ^{(3)}	3–1	0.524
New South Wales	Hills South ^{(6)}	3–1	1.476
Victoria	Mariners	3–1	1.600
Queensland	Far North Coast	1–3	2.650
Northern Territory	Alice Springs	0–4	4.867

Pool B
State/Territory	LL Organization	Record	RAR
New South Wales	North Cronulla ^{(4)}	3–1	1.115
New South Wales	Ryde North ^{(7)}	3–1	1.609
Queensland	Brisbane North	2–2	1.200
New South Wales	MacArthur	2–2	1.250
Queensland	Gold Coast	0–4	2.824

Pool D
State/Territory	LL Organization	Record	RAR
Western Australia	Perth North ^{(1)}	4–0	0.300
South Australia	Adelaide South ^{(8)}	2–2	0.727
Western Australia	West Coast	2–2	0.958
Victoria	Sunraysia	2–2	3.588
South Australia	Mount Gambier	0–4	4.429

Quarter-finals
June 4 – Gold Coast (F/7)
1 (Western Australia) Perth North	8
8 (South Australia) Adelaide South	9
June 4 – Gold Coast
3 (Victoria (state)) Yarra	7
6 (New South Wales) Hills South	6
June 4 – Gold Coast
4 (New South Wales) North Cronulla	6
5 (Western Australia) Swan Hills	5
June 4 – Gold Coast
2 (Western Australia) Perth Central	4
7 (New South Wales) Ryde North	1

Semi-finals
June 4 – Gold Coast (F/4)
8 (South Australia) Adelaide South	14
3 (Victoria (state)) Yarra	0
June 4 – Gold Coast
4 (New South Wales) North Cronulla	1
2 (Western Australia) Perth Central	3

Final
June 5 – Gold Coast
8 (South Australia) Adelaide South	2
2 (Western Australia) Perth Central	8

=== Canada ===
The tournament took place in Glace Bay, Nova Scotia on August 2–11.

Province	City	LL Organization	Record
British Columbia	White Rock	White Rock South Surrey	6–0
Ontario	Nepean	East Nepean	5–1
Nova Scotia (Host)	Glace Bay	Glace Bay	4–2
Quebec	Montreal	Notre-Dame-de-Grâce	2–4
New Brunswick	Saint John	Saint John	2–4
Saskatchewan	Regina	North Regina	1–5
Alberta	Medicine Hat	Medicine Hat	1–5

Semi-finals
August 11 - Glace Bay (F/4)
4 Quebec	1
1 British Columbia	11
August 11 - Glace Bay
3 Nova Scotia	0
2 Ontario	5

Final
August 11 - Glace Bay
1 British Columbia	1
2 Ontario	5

=== Caribbean ===
The tournament took place in Bonaire, Netherlands (formerly part of the Netherlands Antilles) from July 13–20.

Pool A
Country	City	LL Organization	Record
U.S. Virgin Islands	St. Thomas	Elrod Hendricks West LL	3–0
U.S. Virgin Islands	St. Croix	Elma Plaskett East LL	2–1
Sint Maarten	Philipsburg	St. Maarten	1–2
Jamaica	Portland	West Portland	0–3

Pool B
Country	City	LL Organization	Record
Curaçao	Willemstad	Pariba	3–0
Aruba	Santa Cruz	Aruba Center	2–1
Puerto Rico	San Lorenzo	Samaritana	1–2
Bonaire	Kralendijk	Bonaire	0–3

Quarterfinals
3B	Puerto Rico	10
2A	U.S. Virgin Islands (St. Croix)	0
3A	Sint Maarten	0
2B	Aruba	10

Semifinals
1A	U.S. Virgin Islands (St. Thomas)	1
3B	Puerto Rico	12
1B	Curaçao	2
2B	Aruba	1

Finals
3B	Puerto Rico	6
1B	Curaçao	4
Third place
1A	U.S. Virgin Islands (St. Thomas)	6
2B	Aruba	2

=== Europe and Africa ===
The tournament took place in Kutno, Poland from July 13–21.

Note: No Ugandan team was able to participate in the tournament, due to the fact that some players from the previous year's Lugazi squad moved and played with the Allen VR school, the team who won this year's Ugandan tournament. Little League rules allow this in the United States, but it is not allowed in Uganda.

Pool A
Country	City	LL Organization	Record
Italy	Emilia	Emilia	4–0
Austria	Vienna	East Austria	2–2
United Kingdom	London	London Area Youth	2–2
France	Rouen	Haute Normandie	1–3
Ukraine	Rivne	Rivne	1–3

Pool B
Country	City	LL Organization	Record
Czech Republic	Brno	South Moravia	5–0
(United States) Germany-US	Ramstein	KMC American	4–1
Netherlands	Rotterdam	Rotterdam	3–2
Belarus	Skidzyelʹ	Sugar Storm	2–3
Lithuania	Vilnius	Vilnius	1–4
Serbia	Belgrade	Serbia	0–5

Quarter-finals
July 18 – Kutno
4B Belarus	1
1A Italy	14
July 18 – Kutno
3A United Kingdom	3
2B (United States) Germany-US	5
July 18 – Kutno
3B Netherlands	8
2A Austria	3
July 18 – Kutno
4A France	1
1B Czech Republic	20

Semi-finals
July 19 – Kutno
1A Italy	3
2B (United States) Germany-US	0
July 19 – Kutno
3B Netherlands	8
1B Czech Republic	11

Final
July 20 – Kutno
1A Italy	0
1B Czech Republic	3

=== Japan ===
The first two rounds of the tournament were held on June 30, and the remaining two rounds were played on July 7. All games were played in Tokyo.

Participating teams	Prefecture	City	LL Organization
Chūgoku Champions	Hiroshima	Hiroshima	Hiroshima Saiki
Higashikanto Champions	Chiba	Matsudo	Matsudo
Hokkaido Champions	Hokkaido	Sapporo	Sapporo Shiroishi
Kanagawa Champions	Kanagawa	Yokohama	Yokohama Aoba
Kansai Champions	Hyogo	Takarazuka	Takarazuka
Kansai Runner-Up	Osaka	Kishiwada	Kishiwada
Kitakanto Champions	Saitama	Ōmiya City	Ōmiya
Kyushu Champions	Kumamoto	Kumamoto	Kumamoto Chuo
Shikoku Champions	Ehime	Iyo District	Tobe
Shin'etsu Champions	Nagano	Ueda	Ueda Minami
Tōhoku Champions	Miyagi	Sendai	Sendai Aoba
Tōhoku Runner-Up	Miyagi	Sendai	Miyagino
Tōkai Champions	Shizuoka	Hamamatsu	Hamamatsu Minami
Tōkai Runner-Up	Aichi	Ichinomiya	Owari Ichinomiya
Tokyo Champions	Tokyo	Fuchū	Musashi Fuchū
Tokyo Runner-Up	Tokyo	Chōfu	Chōfu

Round of 16
June 29 – Tokyo
(Hiroshima Prefecture) Hiroshima Saiki	3
(Tokyo) Musashi Fuchū	6
June 29 – Tokyo
(Hokkaido) Sapporo Shiroishi	0
(Osaka Prefecture) Kishiwada	8
June 29 – Tokyo
(Kumamoto Prefecture) Kumamoto Chuo	5
(Aichi Prefecture) Owari Ichinomiya	6
June 29 – Tokyo
(Miyagi Prefecture) Sendai Aoba	2
(Saitama Prefecture) Ōmiya	0
June 29 – Tokyo
(Kanagawa Prefecture) Yokohama Aoba	9
(Shizuoka Prefecture) Hamamatsu Minami	2
June 29 – Tokyo
(Ehime Prefecture) Tobe	2
(Tokyo) Chōfu	3
June 29 – Tokyo
(Chiba Prefecture) Matsudo	2
(Miyagi Prefecture) Miyagino	6
June 29 – Tokyo
(Nagano Prefecture) Ueda Minami	16
(Hyōgo Prefecture) Takarazuka	5

Quarter-finals
June 29 – Tokyo
(Tokyo) Musashi Fuchū	11
(Osaka Prefecture) Kishiwada	1
June 29 – Tokyo
(Aichi Prefecture) Owari Ichinomiya	5
(Miyagi Prefecture) Sendai Aoba	15
June 29 – Tokyo
(Kanagawa Prefecture) Yokohama Aoba	12
(Tokyo) Chōfu	4
June 29 – Tokyo
(Miyagi Prefecture) Miyagino	7
(Nagano Prefecture) Ueda Minami	6

Semi-finals
July 6 – Tokyo
(Tokyo) Musashi Fuchū	8
(Miyagi Prefecture) Sendai Aoba	5
July 6 – Tokyo (F/5)
(Kanagawa Prefecture) Yokohama Aoba	6
(Miyagi Prefecture) Miyagino	17

Final
July 6 – Tokyo
(Tokyo) Musashi Fuchū	11
(Miyagi Prefecture) Miyagino	6

=== Latin America ===
The tournament took place in Guayaquil, Ecuador from July 20–27.

Country	City	LL Organization	Record
Panama	Aguadulce	Aguadulce Cabezera	6–0
Venezuela	Maracaibo	San Francisco	5–1
Ecuador (A)	Guayaquil	C Unidas Miraflores	4–2
Colombia	Cartagena	Falcon	3–3
Nicaragua	Managua	14 De Septiembre	2–4
Ecuador (B)	Guayaquil	C Unidas Miraflores	1–5
Bolivia	Cochabamba	Cochabamba	0–6

Final
July 27 – Guayaquil
Venezuela	2
Panama	6

=== Mexico ===
The tournament took place in Reynosa, Tamaulipas from July 8–14.

Pool A
City	LL Organization	Record
Reynosa, Tamaulipas	Trevino Kelly	5–1
Boca del Río, Veracruz	Beto Ávila	5–1
Santa Catarina, Nuevo León	Santa Catarina	4–2
Guaymas, Sonora	Guaymas Sector Pesca	3–3
(Chihuahua (state)) Delicias, Chihuahua	A. Cura Trillo	2–4
Zapopan, Jalisco	Legion Zapopan	1–5
Nueva Rosita, Coahuila	Rogelio Jimenez Lozano	1–5

Pool B
City	LL Organization	Record
Guadalupe, Nuevo León	Guadalupe Linda Vista	5–1
Tijuana, Baja California	Municipal De Tijuana	5–1
Saltillo, Coahuila	Saltillo	5–1
Guadalajara, Jalisco	Guadalara Sutaj	3–3
Matamoros, Tamaulipas	Villa Del Refugio	2–4
(Chihuahua (state)) Ciudad Juárez, Chihuahua	El Granjero	1–5
Cotaxtla, Veracruz	Cotaxtla	0–6

Semi-finals
July 14 – Reynosa
2B (Baja California) Municipal De Tijuana	14
1A (Tamaulipas) Trevino Kelly	0
July 14 – Reynosa
2A (Veracruz) Beto Ávila	1
1B (Nuevo León) Guadalupe Linda Vista	0

Final
July 14 – Reynosa
2B (Baja California) Municipal De Tijuana	11
2A (Veracruz) Beto Ávila	5
