= Little League World Series (Southeast Region) =

Children's baseball tournament

Southeast Region
- Most recent season or competition: 2026 Little League World Series qualification
- Formerly: South Region (1957–2000)
- Sport: Baseball
- Founded: 2001; 25 years ago
- No. of teams: 8
- Country: United States
- Most recent champions: Phenix City Youth Baseball Little League, Phenix City, Alabama
- Most titles: Tennessee (7); (Georgia (U.S. state)) Warner Robins American Little League, Warner Robins, Georgia (3); Nolensville Little League, Nolensville, Tennessee (3)
- Website: Little League Baseball & Softball Southeast Region Headquarters

The Southeast Region is one of ten United States regions that currently send teams to the Little League World Series, the largest youth baseball competition in the world. The region's participation in the LLWS dates back to 1957, when it was known as the South Region. However, when the LLWS was expanded in 2001 from eight teams (four U.S. teams and four "International" teams from the rest of the world) to 16 teams (eight U.S. and eight International), the Southern Region was split into the Southeast and Southwest Regions.

The Southeast Region is made up of eight southeastern states.

- Alabama
- Florida
- (Georgia (U.S. state)) Georgia
- North Carolina
- South Carolina
- Tennessee
- Virginia
- West Virginia

Regional headquarters have been located in Warner Robins, Georgia since 2008. The regional tournament moved to Warner Robins in 2010. Prior to 2010, St. Petersburg, Florida hosted the tournament.

== Regional championship ==
The year's winner is indicated in green. Columbus in 2006, Warner Robins in 2007 and Lake Mary in 2024 went on to become the World Series champions.

Year	Alabama	Florida	(Georgia (U.S. state)) Georgia	North Carolina	South Carolina	Tennessee	Virginia	West Virginia
2001	Joined region in 2002	Apopka National LL; Apopka	Sandy Springs LL; Sandy Springs	Matthews National LL; Matthews	Northwood National LL; Taylors	Joined region in 2002	Vienna American LL; Vienna	Fairmont LL; Fairmont
2002	Phenix City National LL; Phenix City	Braden River LL; Bradenton	Columbus American LL; Columbus	Southwest Forsyth LL; Clemmons	Hillbrook LL; Spartanburg	Morristown American LL; Morristown	Bridgewater Community LL; Bridgewater	Charles Town-Ranson LL; Charles Town
2003	Russellville LL; Russellville	East Boynton Beach LL; Boynton Beach	Buckhead LL; Atlanta	Wilmington LL; Wilmington	Gaffney American LL; Gaffney	Johnson City National LL; Johnson City	West Springfield American LL; Springfield	Hedgesville LL; Hedgesville
2004	Westside LL; Mobile	Cocoa LL; Cocoa	Columbus Northern LL; Columbus	Morganton LL; Morganton	TCFM Yellow Jacket LL; Fort Mill	Donelson National LL; Hermitage	Tuckahoe National LL; Richmond	Ripley LL; Ripley
2005	Phenix City National LL; Phenix City	Maitland LL; Maitland	Buckhead LL; Atlanta	Southwest Forsyth LL; Clemmons	Northwood American LL; Greenville	Columbia American LL; Columbia	West Springfield American LL; Springfield	Barboursville LL; Barboursville
2006	Cottage Hill LL; Mobile	Greater Dunedin LL; Dunedin	Columbus Northern LL; Columbus	Tar Heel LL; Greenville	TCFM Yellow Jacket LL; Fort Mill	Columbia American LL; Columbia	Tuckahoe National LL; Richmond	Bridgeport LL; Bridgeport
2007	Westside LL; Mobile	North Palm Beach LL; North Palm Beach	Warner Robins American LL; Warner Robins	North Durham LL; Durham	Wren LL; Piedmont	Tullahoma American LL; Tullahoma	SYA East LL; Centreville	South Berkeley LL; Inwood
2008	Mobile Westside LL; Mobile	Citrus Park LL; Citrus Park	Warner Robins American LL; Warner Robins	Wilmington LL; Wilmington	TCFM Yellow Jackets LL; Fort Mill	Tullahoma National LL; Tullahoma	Tuckahoe American LL; Richmond	Hurricane LL; Hurricane
2009	Jackson LL; Jackson	Rockledge LL; Rockledge	Warner Robins American LL; Warner Robins	Coulwood Oakdale LL; Charlotte	Greenwood Abbeville LL; Greenwood	Tullahoma National LL; Tullahoma	Chantilly American LL; Chantilly	Hurricane LL; Hurricane
2010	Huntsville Eastern LL; Huntsville	Viera/Suntree LL; Melbourne	Columbus Northern LL; Columbus	Winston-Salem National LL; Winston-Salem	Carolina Forest LL; Carolina Forest	Spring Hill LL; Spring Hill	SYA East LL; Centreville	Ripley LL; Ripley
2011	Westside LL; Huntsville	New Tampa LL; Tampa	Warner Robins American East LL; Warner Robins	Tar Heel LL; Greenville	Irmo LL; Irmo	Goodlettsville Baseball LL; Goodlettsville	Reston National LL; Reston	Fairmont LL; Fairmont
2012	Beehive LL; Auburn	Plant City LL; Plant City	Warner Robins American West LL; Warner Robins	Tar Heel LL; Greenville	Irmo LL; Irmo	Goodlettsville Baseball LL; Goodlettsville	Great Falls LL; Great Falls	Shinnston LL; Shinnston
2013	Jackson LL; Jackson	Martin County North LL; Palm City	Columbus Northern LL; Columbus	Myers Park/Trinity LL; Charlotte	Northwood LL; Taylors	South Nashville LL; Nashville	Tuckahoe American LL; Henrico	Barboursville LL; Barboursville
2014	Jackson LL; Jackson	South Brandon LL; Brandon	Columbus Northern LL; Columbus^{[a]}	Southwest Forsyth LL; Clemmons	Northwood LL; Taylors	South Nashville LL; Nashville	Tuckahoe American LL; Henrico	Bridgeport LL; Bridgeport
2015	Phenix City American LL; Phenix City	Keystone LL; Tampa	Peachtree City American LL; Peachtree City	Wilson City LL; Wilson	Northwood LL; Taylors	South Nashville American LL; Nashville	Mechanicsville National LL; Mechanicsville	Bridgeport LL; Bridgeport
2016	Huntsville American LL; Huntsville	North Palm Beach County LL; North Palm Beach	Peachtree City American LL; Peachtree City	Bull City LL; Durham	Irmo LL; Irmo	Goodlettsville Baseball LL; Goodlettsville	Vienna American LL; Vienna	Bridgeport LL; Bridgeport
2017	Ladonia Youth Sports LL; Phenix City	West Boynton Beach LL; Boynton Beach	Peachtree City National LL; Peachtree City	North State LL; Greenville	Greenville LL; Greenville	Goodlettsville Baseball LL; Goodlettsville	Fort Hunt LL; Alexandria	Logan Civic LL; Logan
2018	McCalla LL; Bessemer	Lehigh Acres LL; Lehigh Acres	Peachtree City American LL; Peachtree City	North State LL; Greenville	Northwood LL; Taylors	South Nashville South LL; Nolensville	Loudoun South American LL; South Riding	Barboursville LL; Barboursville
2019	Huntsville American LL; Huntsville	Viera/Suntree LL; Melbourne	Peachtree City National LL; Peachtree City	Wilson City LL; Wilson	Northwood LL; Taylors	Goodlettsville Baseball LL; Goodlettsville	Loudoun South American LL; South Riding	Hurricane LL; Hurricane
2020	Not held due to the COVID-19 pandemic							
2021	Sylacauga LL; Sylacauga	Martin County; North LL; Palm City	Columbus Northern LL; Columbus	Greenville Tar Heel LL; Greenville	Northwood LL; Taylors	Nolensville LL; Nolensville	Warwick LL; Newport News	Jefferson County LL; Shenandoah Junction
2022	Sylacauga LL; Sylacauga	Keystone LL; Tampa	Harris County LL; Hamilton	Bull City LL; Durham	Northwood LL; Taylors	Nolensville LL; Nolensville	Loudoun South American LL; South Riding	Bridgeport LL; Bridgeport
2023	Coosa LL; Rainbow City	Lake Mary LL; Lake Mary	Harris County LL; Hamilton	South Durham LL; Durham	Northwood LL; Taylors	Nolensville National LL; Nolensville	Vienna American LL; Vienna	Bridgeport LL; Bridgeport
2024	Coosa LL; Rainbow City	Lake Mary LL; Lake Mary	Oconee County American LL; Watkinsville	Greenville Tar Heel LL; Greenville	Irmo LL; Irmo	Goodlettsville Baseball LL; Goodlettsville	Chesterfield LL; Chesterfield	Hurricane LL; Hurricane
2025	Phenix City Youth Baseball LL; Phenix City	Lake Mary LL; Lake Mary	Cartersville LL; Cartersville	Lake Norman LL; Huntersville	Irmo LL; Irmo	Nolensville LL; Nolensville	Front Royal LL; Front Royal	Jefferson County LL; Shenandoah Junction
2026	Phenix City Youth Baseball LL; Phenix City	Chaires–Capitola LL; Tallahassee	Columbus American LL; Columbus	Lake Norman LL; Huntersville	Irmo LL; Irmo	Nolensville LL; Nolensville	SYA LL; Centreville	Shady Spring LL; Shady Spring

== LLWS results ==
As of the 2026 Little League World Series.

Year	Champion	City	LLWS	Record
2001	Apopka National LL	(Florida) Apopka	Runner-up	4–2
2002	Southwest Forsyth LL	(North Carolina) Clemmons	Group stage	0–3
2003	East Boynton Beach LL	(Florida) Boynton Beach	Runner-up	4–2
2004	Morganton LL	(North Carolina) Morganton	U.S. semifinal	2–2
2005	Maitland LL	(Florida) Maitland	U.S. semifinal	2–2
2006	Northern LL	(Georgia (U.S. state)) Columbus	Champions	5–1
2007	Warner Robins American LL	(Georgia (U.S. state)) Warner Robins	Champions	5–1
2008	Citrus Park LL	(Florida) Tampa	U.S. semifinal	2–2
2009	Warner Robins American LL	(Georgia (U.S. state)) Warner Robins	U.S. semifinal	3–1
2010	Columbus Northern LL	(Georgia (U.S. state)) Columbus	Group stage	2–2
2011	Warner Robins American LL	(Georgia (U.S. state)) Warner Robins	Round 3	2–2
2012	Goodlettsville Baseball LL	(Tennessee) Goodlettsville	Runner-up	4–1
2013	South Nashville LL	(Tennessee) Nashville	Round 3	2–2
2014	South Nashville LL	(Tennessee) Nashville	Round 1	1–2
2015	Northwood LL	(South Carolina) Taylors	Round 2	1–2
2016	Goodlettsville Baseball LL	(Tennessee) Goodlettsville	4th place	4–3
2017	North State LL	(North Carolina) Greenville	4th place	3–2
2018	Peachtree City American LL	(Georgia (U.S. state)) Peachtree City	4th place	4–3
2019	Loudoun South American LL	(Virginia) South Riding	U.S. Semifinal	2–2
2020	LLWS not held due to the COVID-19 pandemic			
2021 (Note: Due to the COVID-19 pandemic, Little League International did not invite teams from outside the U.S. to the LLWS in 2021. Instead, the top two teams in each U.S. region qualified.)	Nolensville LL	(Tennessee) Nolensville	Round 1	0–2
2021	Martin County North LL	(Florida) Palm City	Round 1	0–2
2022	Nolensville LL	(Tennessee) Nolensville	4th place	4–3
2023	Nolensville LL	(Tennessee) Nolensville	Round 4	2–2
2024	Lake Mary LL	(Florida) Lake Mary	Champions	7–1
2025	Irmo LL	(South Carolina) Irmo	U.S. semifinal	3–2
2026	Phenix City Youth Baseball LL	(Alabama) Phenix City	Round 4	3–2

=== Results by state ===
As of the 2026 Little League World Series.

State	Southeast Championships	LLWS Championships	Record in LLWS	PCT
Tennessee	7	0	17–15	.531
Georgia	6	2	21–10	.677
Florida	5	1	19–11	.633
North Carolina	3	0	5–7	.417
South Carolina	2	0	4–4	.500
Alabama	1	0	3–2	.600
Virginia	1	0	2–2	.500
West Virginia	0	0	0–0	–
Total	25	3	71–51	.582

=== Format ===
As with all other regions, the tournament offers a "modified double elimination" format. Teams compete in a double-elimination tournament format with the exception of the championship game, which is a one-game, "winner take all," game regardless of the number of previous tournament losses by either team.

== Notes ==
- ^a Peachtree City National Little League of Peachtree City, Georgia won the Georgia state tournament by defeating Columbus Northern. However, Peachtree City was stripped of their title by virtue of having twelve players on the team whose league age was 12 years old. Little League regulations state that the maximum number for a team is eight.

== See also ==
- Little League World Series (South Region)
- Little League World Series (Southwest Region)

South Region in other Little League divisions

- Intermediate League
- Junior League
- Senior League
- Big League
