= 2018 Little League World Series qualification =

Children's baseball competition qualification

United States
- Great Lakes winner: Grosse Pointe Woods, Michigan
- Mid-Atlantic winner: (New York (state)) Staten Island, New York
- Midwest winner: Des Moines, Iowa
- New England winner: Coventry, Rhode Island
- Northwest winner: Coeur d'Alene, Idaho
- Southeast winner: (Georgia (U.S. state)) Peachtree City, Georgia
- Southwest winner: Houston, Texas
- West winner: Honolulu, Hawaii

International
- Asia-Pacific and Middle East winner: Seoul, South Korea
- Australia winner: (Australia) Gold Coast, Queensland
- Canada winner: (Canada) Surrey, British Columbia
- Caribbean winner: Guayama, Puerto Rico
- Europe and Africa winner: Barcelona, Spain
- Japan winner: (Japan) Kawaguchi, Saitama
- Latin America winner: Arraiján, Panama
- Mexico winner: (Mexico) Matamoros, Tamaulipas

Tournaments

Qualification for the 2018 Little League World Series took place in eight United States regions and eight international regions from June through August 2018.

== United States ==
=== Great Lakes ===
The tournament took place in Westfield, Indiana from August 5–11.

| State | City | LL Organization | Record |
|---|---|---|---|
| Illinois | West Dundee | Tri-Cities | 0–2 |
| Indiana | New Albany | New Albany | 3–2 |
| Kentucky | St. Matthews | St. Matthews Baseball | 1–2 |
| Michigan | Grosse Pointe Woods | Grosse Pointe Woods-Shores | 4–0 |
| Ohio | New Albany | New Albany | 2–2 |
| Wisconsin | Wausau | Wausau National | 0–2 |

August 6 – Game 3
Wisconsin | 2
August 5 – Game 1
Michigan | 12
Illinois | 2
August 8 – Game 7 (F/4)
Michigan | 7
Michigan | 14
August 5 – Game 2
Indiana | 2
Indiana | 6
August 6 – Game 4
Kentucky | 1
Ohio | 5
Indiana | 8
August 11 – Championship (F/4)
Michigan | 13
August 7 – Game 5
Indiana | 0
Illinois | 0
August 9 – Game 8
Ohio | 4
Ohio | 9
August 7 – Game 6
Kentucky | 1
Kentucky | 2
August 10 – Game 9
Wisconsin | 1
Indiana | 8
Ohio | 0

=== Mid-Atlantic ===
The tournament took place in Bristol, Connecticut from August 5–12.

| State | City | LL Organization | Record |
|---|---|---|---|
| Delaware | Milton | Milton | 0–2 |
| Maryland | Berlin | Berlin | 4–2 |
| New Jersey | Middletown | Middletown | 1–2 |
| New York | Staten Island | Mid-Island | 4–0 |
| Pennsylvania | Clinton County | Keystone | 1–2 |
| Washington, D.C. | | Mamie Johnson | 0–2 |

August 6 – Game 3
Pennsylvania | 0
August 5 – Game 1
New York | 7
New York | 10
August 8 – Game 7
Washington, D.C. | 2
New York | 5
August 5 – Game 2
New Jersey | 2
Maryland | 6
August 6 – Game 4
Delaware | 0
New Jersey | 6
Maryland | 2
August 12 – Championship
New York | 4
August 7 – Game 5
Maryland | 0
Washington, D.C. | 7
August 9 – Game 8
Maryland | 18
Maryland | 6
August 7 – Game 6
Pennsylvania | 0
Delaware | 1
August 10 – Game 9 (F/5)
Pennsylvania | 6
New Jersey | 1
Maryland | 11

=== Midwest ===
The tournament took place in Westfield, Indiana from August 5–11.

Note: North Dakota and South Dakota are organized into a single Little League district.

| State | City | LL Organization | Record |
|---|---|---|---|
| Iowa | Des Moines | Grandview | 4–1 |
| Kansas | Pittsburg | J.L. Hutchinson Baseball | 1–2 |
| Minnesota | Coon Rapids | Coon Rapids Andover American | 2–2 |
| Missouri | Webb City | Webb City | 0–2 |
| Nebraska | Kearney | Kearney | 0–2 |
| North Dakota | Fargo | Fargo | 3–1 |

August 6 – Game 3 (F/4)
Kansas | 1
August 5 – Game 1
Minnesota | 11
Missouri | 0
August 8 – Game 7
Minnesota | 4
Minnesota | 0
August 5 – Game 2 (F/5)
North Dakota | 6
North Dakota | 15
August 6 – Game 4
Nebraska | 1
Iowa | 1
North Dakota | 4
August 11 – Championship
North Dakota | 4
August 7 – Game 5 (F/7)
Iowa | 7
Missouri | 1
August 9 – Game 8 (F/5)
Iowa | 2
Iowa | 14
August 7 – Game 6
Kansas | 0
Nebraska | 3
August 10 – Game 9
Kansas | 5
Minnesota | 2
Iowa | 6

=== New England ===
The tournament took place in Bristol, Connecticut from August 5–12.

| State | City | LL Organization | Record |
|---|---|---|---|
| Connecticut | Fairfield | Fairfield American | 1–2 |
| Maine | Saco | Saco/Maremont | 0–2 |
| Massachusetts | Pittsfield | Pittsfield American | 3–1 |
| New Hampshire | Goffstown | Goffstown Junior Baseball | 2–2 |
| Rhode Island | Coventry | Coventry | 4–1 |
| Vermont | South Burlington | South Burlington | 0–2 |

August 6 – Game 3 (F/5)
Vermont | 0
August 5 – Game 1 (F/4)
Rhode Island | 10
Connecticut | 0
August 8 – Game 7
Rhode Island | 10
Rhode Island | 1
August 5 – Game 2
Massachusetts | 10
Massachusetts | 4
August 6 – Game 4
New Hampshire | 2
Maine | 4
Massachusetts | 9
August 12 – Championship
Massachusetts | 2
August 7 – Game 5
Rhode Island | 3
Connecticut | 7
August 9 – Game 8
Maine | 1
Connecticut | 3
August 7 – Game 6
New Hampshire | 9
New Hampshire | 13
August 10 – Game 9
Vermont | 0
Rhode Island | 6
New Hampshire | 5

=== Northwest ===
The tournament took place in San Bernardino, California August 5–11.

| State | City | LL Organization | Record |
|---|---|---|---|
| Alaska | Juneau | Gastineau Channel | 1–2 |
| Idaho | Coeur d'Alene | Coeur d'Alene | 4–1 |
| Montana | Billings | Boulder Arrowhead | 2–1 |
| Oregon | Beaverton | Murrayhill | 2–2 |
| Washington | Seattle | West Seattle | 1–2 |
| Wyoming | Gillette | Gillette | 0–2 |

August 6 – Game 3
Montana | 11
August 5 – Game 1
Alaska | 0
Alaska | 2
August 9 – Game 8
Oregon | 1
Montana | 5
August 5 – Game 2 (F/5)
Idaho | 2
Washington | 6
August 6 – Game 4
Idaho | 16
Wyoming | 1
Idaho | 13
August 11 – Championship
Montana | 0
August 7 – Game 5
Idaho | 2
Oregon | 13
August 8 – Game 7
Wyoming | 10
Oregon | 7
August 7 – Game 6
Washington | 3
Washington | 11
August 10 – Game 9
Alaska | 2
Idaho | 8
Oregon | 3

=== Southeast ===
The tournament took place in Warner Robins, Georgia from August 3–8.

| State | City | LL Organization | Record |
|---|---|---|---|
| Alabama | Bessemer | McCalla | 2–2 |
| Florida | Lehigh Acres | Lehigh Acres | 0–2 |
| Georgia | Peachtree City | Peachtree City American | 4–0 |
| North Carolina | Greenville | North State | 1–2 |
| South Carolina | Taylors | Northwood | 1–2 |
| Tennessee | Nolensville | South Nashville South | 0–2 |
| Virginia | South Riding | Loudoun South American | 4–2 |
| West Virginia | Barboursville | Barboursville | 2–2 |

August 3 – Game 1
Georgia | 1
August 4 – Game 7
Tennessee | 0
Georgia | 4
August 3 – Game 2
Virginia | 3
West Virginia | 5
August 6 – Game 12
Virginia | 12
Georgia | 8
August 3 – Game 3 (F/4)
Alabama | 3
Alabama | 12
August 4 – Game 8
North Carolina | 2
Alabama | 3
August 3 – Game 4
South Carolina | 2
South Carolina | 10
Florida | 2
August 8 – Championship
Georgia | 3
August 4 – Game 5
Virginia | 0
Tennessee | 1
August 5 – Game 9
West Virginia | 2
South Carolina | 0
West Virginia | 3
August 6 – Game 11
West Virginia | 4
August 4 – Game 6
Virginia | 7
North Carolina | 5
August 5 – Game 10
Florida | 2
Virginia | 4
North Carolina | 3
August 7 – Game 13 (F/7)
Alabama | 6
Virginia | 9

=== Southwest ===
The tournament took place in Waco, Texas August 2–8.

| State | City | LL Organization | Record |
|---|---|---|---|
| Arkansas | White Hall | White Hall | 1–2 |
| Colorado | Colorado Springs | Academy | 0–2 |
| Louisiana | Lake Charles | South Lake Charles | 2–2 |
| Mississippi | Meadville | Franklin County | 1–2 |
| New Mexico | Carlsbad | Shorthorn | 3–2 |
| Oklahoma | Tulsa | Tulsa National | 3–2 |
| Texas East | Houston | Post Oak | 4–0 |
| Texas West | Brownsville | East Brownsville | 0–2 |

August 2 – Game 1
Louisiana | 7
August 4 – Game 7 (F/7)
Texas West | 3
Louisiana | 2
August 2 – Game 2
Oklahoma | 3
Oklahoma | 6
August 6 – Game 12
New Mexico | 3
Oklahoma | 0
August 2 – Game 3
Texas East | 5
Colorado | 10
August 4 – Game 8 (F/5)
Mississippi | 15
Mississippi | 4
August 2 – Game 4 (F/4)
Texas East | 16
Texas East | 14
Arkansas | 1
August 8 – Championship
Texas East | 8
August 3 – Game 5
Oklahoma | 0
Texas West | 5
August 5 – Game 9
New Mexico | 6
Mississippi | 6
New Mexico | 10
August 6 – Game 11
New Mexico | 3
August 3 – Game 6
Louisiana | 0
Colorado | 2
August 5 – Game 10
Arkansas | 4
Louisiana | 11
Arkansas | 6
August 7 – Game 13
Oklahoma | 3
New Mexico | 2

=== West ===
The tournament took place in San Bernardino, California August 5–11.

| State | City | LL Organization | Record |
|---|---|---|---|
| Arizona | Tucson | Sunnyside | 0–2 |
| Hawaii | Honolulu | Honolulu | 4–0 |
| Nevada | Las Vegas | Silverado West | 1–2 |
| Northern California | Rocklin | Tri-City | 3–2 |
| Southern California | Chula Vista | Park View | 2–2 |
| Utah | St. George | Dixie | 0–2 |

August 6 – Game 3
Utah | 2
August 5 – Game 1
Hawaii | 8
Arizona | 3
August 9 – Game 8
Hawaii | 7
Hawaii | 5
August 5 – Game 2
Nevada | 1
Southern California | 16
August 6 – Game 4
Northern California | 8
Nevada | 5
Southern California | 3
August 11 – Championship
Hawaii | 11
August 7 – Game 5
Northern California | 2
Arizona | 5
August 8 – Game 7
Southern California | 9
Southern California | 5
August 7 – Game 6
Northern California | 7
Northern California | 6
August 10 – Game 9
Utah | 0
Nevada | 0
Northern California | 11

== International ==
=== Asia-Pacific ===
The tournament took place in Seoul, South Korea from June 30–July 6.

Pool A
| Country | Record |
|---|---|
| South Korea | 4–0 |
| Guam | 3–1 |
| China | 2–2 |
| Northern Mariana Islands | 1–3 |
| Indonesia | 0–4 |

Pool B
| Country | Record |
|---|---|
| Chinese Taipei^{1} | 4–0 |
| Hong Kong | 3–1 |
| Thailand | 2–2 |
| New Zealand | 1–3 |
| Philippines | 0–4 |

^{1} Republic of China, commonly known as Taiwan, due to complicated relations with People's Republic of China, is recognized by the name Chinese Taipei by majority of international organizations including Little League Baseball (LLB). For more information, please see Cross-Strait relations.

Semi-finals
July 5 – Seoul
1A South Korea | 11
2B Hong Kong | 0
July 5 – Seoul
1B Chinese Taipei | 6
2A Guam | 0

Asia-Pacific Championship
July 6 – Seoul
1A South Korea | 6
1B Chinese Taipei | 1
Third place
July 6 – Seoul
2B Hong Kong | 7
2A Guam | 6

=== Australia ===
The tournament took place in Lismore, New South Wales June 6–11. The top two teams in each pool advanced to the elimination round.

Pool A
| State/Territory | LL Organization | Record |
|---|---|---|
| Victoria | Eastern Athletics | 3–1 |
| Queensland | Gold Coast | 3–1 |
| South Australia | Adelaide Rays | 2–2 |
| Western Australia | Perth Metro Central | 2–2 |
| New South Wales | Manly | 0–4 |

Pool C
| State/Territory | LL Organization | Record |
|---|---|---|
| Western Australia | Perth Metro North | 3–1 |
| Victoria | Southern Mariners | 2–2 |
| Western Australia | Coastal Bay | 2–2 |
| New South Wales | Hills | 2–2 |
| Queensland | Brisbane North | 1–3 |

Pool B
| State/Territory | LL Organization | Record |
|---|---|---|
| New South Wales | Cronulla | 4–0 |
| New South Wales | Illawarra | 2–2 |
| Victoria | Northwestern Twins | 2–2 |
| Western Australia | Southern Hills | 1–3 |
| Queensland | Brisbane Metro | 1–3 |

Pool D
| State/Territory | LL Organization | Record |
|---|---|---|
| New South Wales | Ryde North | 4–0 |
| South Australia | Adelaide Seahawks | 3–1 |
| Western Australia | Swan Hills | 2–2 |
| Queensland | Far North Coast | 1–3 |
| Australian Capital Territory | Canberra | 0–4 |

Quarter-finals
June 9 – Lismore
1A (Victoria (state)) Eastern Athletics | 3
2D (South Australia) Adelaide Seahawks | 7
June 9 – Lismore
1B (New South Wales) Cronulla | 12
2C (Victoria (state)) Southern Mariners | 11
June 9 – Lismore
1C (Western Australia) Perth Metro North | 2
2B (New South Wales) Illawarra | 6
June 9 – Lismore
1D (New South Wales) Ryde North | 1
2A (Queensland) Gold Coast | 5

Semi-finals
June 10 – Lismore
2D (South Australia) Adelaide Seahawks | 7
1B (New South Wales) Cronulla | 2
June 10 – Lismore
2B (New South Wales) Illawarra | 6
2A (Queensland) Gold Coast | 8

Australia Championship
June 11 – Lismore (F/4)
2D (South Australia) Adelaide Seahawks | 0
2A (Queensland) Gold Coast | 11

=== Canada ===
The tournament took place in Mirabel, Quebec from August 2–11.

| Province | City | LL Organization | Record |
|---|---|---|---|
| British Columbia | Surrey | Whalley | 6–0 |
| Quebec (Host) | Mirabel | Diamond Baseball Academy | 5–1 |
| Nova Scotia | Glace Bay | Glace Bay | 4–2 |
| Ontario | Toronto | High Park | 3–3 |
| Saskatchewan | Regina | Regina Kiwanas National | 2–4 |
| Alberta | Lethbridge | Lethbridge Southwest | 1–5 |
| Quebec | Salaberry-de-Valleyfield | Valleyfield | 0–6 |

Semi-finals
August 10
1 British Columbia | 8
4 Ontario | 2
August 10
2 Quebec | 4
3 Nova Scotia | 5

Canada Championship
August 11
1 British Columbia | 11
3 Nova Scotia | 0

=== Caribbean ===
The tournament took place in Sabana Grande, Puerto Rico from July 14–20.

| State | City | LL Organization | Record |
|---|---|---|---|
| Puerto Rico A | Guayama | Radames Lopez | 6–0 |
| Curaçao | Willemstad | Pabao | 4–2 |
| Aruba | Santa Cruz | Aruba Center | 4–2 |
| Bahamas | Nassau | Freedom Farm | 3–3 |
| Dominican Republic | Santiago | Los Bravos de Pontezuela | 3–3 |
| US Virgin Islands | Saint Thomas | District 1 | 1–5 |
| Puerto Rico B | Sabana Grande | Gino Vega | 0–6 |

Semi-finals
July 19
1 Puerto Rico | 3
4 Bahamas | 0
July 19
2 Curaçao | 5
3 Aruba | 2

Caribbean Championship
July 20
Puerto Rico | 5
Curaçao | 2

=== Europe and Africa ===
In an expanded format, 10 countries have automatic berths into the regional tournament based on participation and enrollment figures. A qualifier tournament from additional countries wishing to enter took place from July 12–17. The format of the qualifier tournament is a round robin with an elimination round where the two semifinal winners advanced to the double-elimination regional tournament from July 20–27. Both tournaments took place in Kutno, Poland.

==== Qualifier tournament ====
Teams
| Country | Record |
|---|---|
| Austria | 5–0 |
| Hungary | 4–1 |
| Belarus | 3–2 |
| Croatia | 2–3 |
| Switzerland | 1–4 |
| Poland | 0–5 |

Semi-finals
July 16
1 Austria | 6
4 Croatia | 5
July 16
2 Hungary | 1
3 Belarus | 9

Qualifier Championship±
July 17
1 Austria | –
3 Belarus | –

- Qualifier Championship between Austria and Belarus was canceled due to inclement weather, as a make up was unnecessary because both teams had already advanced.

==== Regional tournament ====
Teams
| Country | City | LL Organization | Record |
|---|---|---|---|
| Austria | Vienna | East Austria | 4–2 |
| Belarus | Skidel | Sugar Storm | 1–2 |
| Belgium | Brussels | Brussels | 0–2 |
| Czech Republic | Prague | Northwest Czech Republic | 3–2 |
| France | Paris | Ile-De-France | 3–2 |
| (United States) Germany-US | Ramstein Air Base | KMC American | 2–2 |
| Italy | Ronchi dei Legionari | Friuli Venezia Giulia | 1–2 |
| Lithuania | Vilnius | Vilnius | 1–2 |
| Netherlands | Haarlem | Kennemerland | 3–2 |
| Spain | Barcelona | Catalunya | 4–0 |
| Ukraine | Kirovograd | Kirovograd Center | 0–2 |
| United Kingdom | London | London | 0–2 |

Results
July 20
| Game | Visitor | Score | Home |
|---|---|---|---|
| 1 | France (1–0) | 10–7 | (United States) Germany-USA (0–1) |
| 2 | Belgium (0–1) | 0–10 | Austria (1–0) |
| 3 | United Kingdom (0–1) | 10–11 | Belarus (1–0) |
| 4 | Czech Republic (1–0) | 9–3 | Italy (0–1) |
July 21
| Game | Visitor | Score | Home |
| 5 | Netherlands (1–0) | 9–4 | France (1–1) |
| 6 | Ukraine (0–1) | 1–2 | Austria (2–0) |
| 7 | Spain (1–0) | 13–3 | Belarus (1–1) |
| 8 | Lithuania (0–1) | 1–16 | Czech Republic (2–0) |
July 22
| Game | Visitor | Score | Home |
| 9 | United Kingdom (0–2) | 4–9 | France (2–1) |
| 10 | Italy (1–1) | 1–0 | Ukraine (0–2) |
| 11 | (United States) Germany-USA (1–1) | 6–2 | Belarus (1–2) |
| 12 | Belgium (0–2) | 7–8 | Lithuania (1–1) |
July 23
| Game | Visitor | Score | Home |
| 13 | Netherlands (2–0) | 11–3 | Austria (2–1) |
| 14 | Spain (2–0) | 1–0 | Czech Republic (2–1) |
| 15 | France (3–1) | 4–2 | Italy (1–2) |
| 16 | (United States) Germany-USA (2–1) | 20–2 | Lithuania (1–2) |
July 24
| Game | Visitor | Score | Home |
| 17 | France (3–2) | 2–10 | Czech Republic (3–1) |
| 18 | (United States) Germany-USA (2–2) | 4–10 | Austria (3–1) |
| 19 | Netherlands (2–1) | 2–6 | Spain (3–0) |
July 25
| Game | Visitor | Score | Home |
| 20 | Czech Republic (3–2) | 5–9 | Austria (4–1) |
July 26
| Game | Visitor | Score | Home |
| 21 | Austria (4–2) | 3–13 | Netherlands (3–1) |
July 27
| Game | Visitor | Score | Home |
| 22 | Spain (4–0) | 19–0 | Netherlands (3–2) |

=== Japan ===
The tournament took place in Tokyo from July 21–22.

| Participating teams | Prefecture | City | LL Organization |
|---|---|---|---|
| Chūgoku Champions | Okayama | Okayama | Okayama |
| Higashikanto Champions | Chiba | Chiba | Chiba City |
| Hokkaido Champions | Hokkaido | Sapporo | Sapporo Shiroishi |
| Kanagawa Champions | Kanagawa | Yokohama | Seya |
| Kansai Champions | Hyogo | Shiso-Gun | Hyogo Yamasaki |
| Kansai Runner-up | Osaka | Takatsuki | Osaka Takatsuki |
| Kitakanto Champions | Saitama | Kawaguchi | Kawaguchi |
| Kyushu Champions | Nagasaki | Nagasaki | Nagasaki Minami |
| Shikoku Champions | Ehime | Niihama | Niihama |
| Shin'etsu Champions | Nagano | Ueda | Ueda Minami |
| Tōhoku Champions | Miyagi | Sendai | Sendai Hirose |
| Tōhoku Runner-up | Miyagi | Sendai | Sendai Aoba |
| Tōkai Champions | Aichi | Anjō | Anjō |
| Tōkai Runner-up | Shizuoka | Hamamatsu | Hamamatsu |
| Tokyo Champions | Tokyo | Tokyo | Tokyo Kitasuna |
| Tokyo Runner-Up | Tokyo | Tokyo | Tokyo Nakano |

Opening Round
July 21 – Tokyo
Tokyo Nakano | 0
(Ehime Prefecture) Niihama | 1
July 21 – Tokyo
(Hokkaido) Sapporo Shiroishi | 7
(Miyagi Prefecture) Sendai Hirose | 8
July 21 – Tokyo
(Kanagawa Prefecture) Seya | 12
(Okayama Prefecture) Okayama | 0
July 21 – Tokyo
(Saitama Prefecture) Kawaguchi | 2
(Aichi Prefecture) Anjō | 1
July 21 – Tokyo
(Nagano Prefecture) Ueda Minami | 10
(Chiba Prefecture) Chiba City | 0
July 21 – Tokyo
Tokyo Kitasuna | 10
(Osaka Prefecture) Osaka Takatsuki | 8
July 21 – Tokyo
(Nagasaki Prefecture) Nagasaki Minami | 11
(Miyagi Prefecture) Sendai Aoba | 1
July 21 – Tokyo
(Hyōgo Prefecture) Hyogo Yamasaki | 5
(Shizuoka Prefecture) Hamamatsu | 2

Quarterfinals
July 21 – Tokyo
(Ehime Prefecture) Niihama | 3
(Miyagi Prefecture) Sendai Hirose | 16
July 21 – Tokyo
(Kanagawa Prefecture) Seya | 2
(Saitama Prefecture) Kawaguchi | 7
July 21 – Tokyo
(Nagano Prefecture) Ueda Minami | 8
Tokyo Kitasuna | 10
July 21 – Tokyo
(Nagasaki Prefecture) Nagasaki Minami | 5
(Hyōgo Prefecture) Hyogo Yamasaki | 2

Semifinals
July 22 – Tokyo
(Miyagi Prefecture) Sendai Hirose | 2
(Saitama Prefecture) Kawaguchi | 13
July 22 – Tokyo
Tokyo Kitasuna | 2
(Nagasaki Prefecture) Nagasaki Minami | 3

Championship
July 22 – Tokyo
(Saitama Prefecture) Kawaguchi | 23
(Nagasaki Prefecture) Nagasaki Minami | 2

=== Latin America ===
The tournament took place in Panama City, Panama from July 21–28.

| State | City | LL Organization | Record |
|---|---|---|---|
| Panama A | Arraiján | Vacamonte | 5–1 |
| Nicaragua | Rivas | Rivas | 5–1 |
| Venezuela | San Francisco | San Francisco | 4–2 |
| Panama B | Aguadulce | Aguadulce Cabezera | 4–2 |
| Colombia | Cartagena | Falcon | 2–4 |
| Guatemala | Guatemala City | Javier | 1–5 |
| Costa Rica | Santo Domingo | Santo Domingo de Heredia | 0–6 |

Semi-finals
July 27
1 Panama A | 2
4 Panama B | 0
July 27
2 Nicaragua | 4
3 Venezuela | 0

Latin America Championship
July 28
Panama | 6
Nicaragua | 3

=== Mexico ===
The tournament took place in Monterrey from July 7–13.

Pool A
| State | City | LL Organization | Record |
|---|---|---|---|
| Tamaulipas | Reynosa | Guadalupe Treviño Kelly | 4–1 |
| Baja California | Mexicali | Seguro Social | 4–1 |
| Veracruz | Medellín | Infantil y Juvenil Veracruzana | 4–1 |
| Nuevo León | Monterrey | Unidad Modelo | 2–3 |
| Coahuila | Torreón | Infantil y Juvenil Sertoma A.C. | 1–4 |
| Chihuahua | Ciudad Juárez | Satélite | 0–5 |

Pool B
| State | City | LL Organization | Record |
|---|---|---|---|
| Tamaulipas | Matamoros | Matamoros A.C. | 6–0 |
| Nuevo León | Guadalupe | Guadalupe Linda Vista | 4–2 |
| Coahuila | Monclova | Ribereña | 4–2 |
| Sonora | Hermosillo | Conno Hermosillo | 3–3 |
| Quintana Roo | Cancún | Quintana Roo | 3–3 |
| Chihuahua | Delicias | A Cura Trillo | 1–5 |
| Jalisco | Guadalajara | Fenix | 0–6 |

Semi-finals
July 12
2B (Nuevo León) Linda Vista | 2
1A (Tamaulipas) Treviño Kelly | 3
July 12
2A (Baja California) Seguro Social | 0
1B (Tamaulipas) Matamoros | 4

Mexico Championship
July 13
1A (Tamaulipas) Treviño Kelly | 3
1B (Tamaulipas) Matamoros | 5
