= 2021 Little League World Series qualification =

Qualified teams
- Great Lakes: Taylor, Michigan; Hamilton, Ohio
- Mid-Atlantic: Oaks, Pennsylvania; Toms River, New Jersey
- Midwest: Sioux Falls, South Dakota; Hastings, Nebraska
- New England: Manchester, Connecticut; Hooksett, New Hampshire
- Northwest: (Washington (state)) Sammamish, Washington; Lake Oswego, Oregon
- Southeast: Palm City, Florida; Nolensville, Tennessee
- Southwest: Lafayette, Louisiana; Abilene, Texas
- West: Honolulu, Hawaii; Torrance, California

Tournaments

Qualification for the 2021 Little League World Series took place across eight United States regions. The first regional tournament began on August 5 and the final tournament concluded on August 14. As a result of the COVID-19 pandemic, Little League Baseball made the decision to hold the tournament without teams from outside of the United States for the first time since 1975. Instead, the top two teams from each U.S. region qualified for the final tournament. In all, 53 teams were invited to the regional tournaments; two from California, two from Texas, one each from the other 48 states, and one from the District of Columbia.

== Great Lakes ==
The tournament took place in Whitestown, Indiana, during August 8–14. On August 11, the team from Kentucky was removed from tournament play due to having at least one positive COVID-19 test.

State	City	LL Organization	Record
Illinois	Hinsdale	Hinsdale	1–2
Indiana	Brownsburg	Brownsburg	0–2
Kentucky	Bowling Green	Warren County South	2–2
Michigan	Taylor	Taylor North	4–0
Ohio	Hamilton	West Side	3–2
Wisconsin	Elm Grove	Elmbrook National	0–2

August 9 – Game 3
Kentucky	1
August 8 – Game 1
Illinois	5
Kentucky	2
August 12 – Game 8 (F/5)
Ohio	1
Illinois	0
August 8 – Game 2 (F/5)
Michigan	10
Wisconsin	0
August 9 – Game 4
Michigan	10
Michigan	9
Indiana	1
August 14 – Championship
Michigan	9
August 10 – Game 5 (F/7)
Ohio	1
Ohio	2
Game 7 – Forfeit
Indiana	1
Ohio	6
August 10 – Game 6 (F/5)
Kentucky	0
Wisconsin	0
August 13 – Game 9 (F/5)
Kentucky	10
Illinois	0
Ohio	12

== Mid-Atlantic ==
The tournament took place in Bristol, Connecticut, during August 8–14.

State	City	LL Organization	Record
Delaware	Bear	Canal	2–2
Maryland	Bethesda	Montgomery County Lower	0–2
New Jersey	Toms River	Toms River East	3–2
New York	Colonie	Colonie	0–2
Pennsylvania	Oaks	Upper Providence	4–0
Washington, D.C.		Capitol City	1–2

August 9 – Game 3
New Jersey	3
August 8 – Game 1
Maryland	1
New Jersey	3
August 12 – Game 8
Delaware	0
New Jersey	1
August 8 – Game 2 (F/7)
Pennsylvania	6
Pennsylvania	5
August 9 – Game 4
Washington, D.C.	1
Pennsylvania	11
New York	3
August 14 – Championship
Pennsylvania	10
August 10 – Game 5
New Jersey	3
Delaware	7
August 11 – Game 7
New York	0
Delaware	14
August 10 – Game 6
Washington, D.C.	1
Washington, D.C.	1
August 13 – Game 9
Maryland	0
New Jersey	6
Delaware	3

== Midwest ==
The tournament took place in Whitestown, Indiana, during August 7–14.

State	City	LL Organization	Record
Iowa	Davenport	Davenport Southeast	2–2
Kansas	Pittsburg	J.L. Hutchinson Baseball	0–2
Minnesota	Circle Pines	Centennial Lakes	1–2
Missouri	Columbia	Daniel Boone National	0–2
Nebraska	Hastings	Hastings Baseball	4–1
North Dakota	Fargo	Fargo	2–2
South Dakota	Sioux Falls	Sioux Falls	3–1

August 8 – Game 4
Missouri	0
August 7 – Game 1 (F/5)
South Dakota	7
South Dakota	10
August 12 – Game 10
Iowa	0
South Dakota	3
August 7 – Game 2
Nebraska	0
North Dakota	0
August 8 – Game 5
Nebraska	1
Nebraska	2
August 7 – Game 3
Minnesota	0
Minnesota	10
Kansas	2
August 14 – Championship
South Dakota	0
August 9 – Game 6
Nebraska	6
North Dakota	6
August 10 – Game 8
Kansas	5
North Dakota	9
Missouri	6
August 11 – Game 9
North Dakota	3
Iowa	11
August 10 – Game 7
Iowa	3
Minnesota	0
August 13 – Game 11
Nebraska	2
Iowa	1

== New England ==
The tournament took place in Bristol, Connecticut, during August 8–14.

State	City	LL Organization	Record
Connecticut	Manchester	Manchester	2–1
Maine	Saco	Saco/Dayton	2–2
Massachusetts	Peabody	Peabody West	1–2
New Hampshire	Hooksett	North Manchester/Hooksett	4–1
Rhode Island	North Providence	North Providence	0–2
Vermont	Essex	Essex Town	1–2

August 9 – Game 3
Vermont	1
August 8 – Game 1
Connecticut	3
Rhode Island	0
August 12 – Game 8
Vermont	1
Connecticut	7
August 8 – Game 2
Massachusetts	4
New Hampshire	0
August 9 – Game 4
Maine	5
Maine	0
Massachusetts	3
August 14 – Championship (F/4)
Connecticut	1
August 10 – Game 5 (F/5)
New Hampshire	11
Rhode Island	3
August 11 – Game 7 (F/5)
Maine	21
Maine	1
August 10 – Game 6 (F/4)
New Hampshire	19
New Hampshire	10
August 13 – Game 9
Vermont	0
Massachusetts	0
New Hampshire	5

== Northwest ==
The tournament took place in San Bernardino, California, during August 8–14. On August 7, the team from Alaska was removed from tournament play due to having at least one positive COVID-19 test.

State	City	LL Organization	Record
Alaska	Eagle River	Knik	0–2
Idaho	Eagle	West Valley	1–2
Montana	Billings	Boulder Arrowhead	1–2
Oregon	Lake Oswego	Lake Oswego	3–2
Washington	Sammamish	Eastlake	4–0
Wyoming	Cody	Cody	1–2

Game 3 – Forfeit
Washington	6
August 8 – Game 1
Alaska	0
Washington	5
August 12 – Game 8
Oregon	0
Washington	10
August 8 – Game 2 (F/4)
Montana	4
Idaho	13
August 9 – Game 4
Wyoming	3
Idaho	5
Montana	6
August 14 – Championship
Washington	2
August 10 – Game 5 (F/5)
Oregon	1
Oregon	14
August 11 – Game 7 (F/4)
Idaho	0
Oregon	11
Game 6 – Forfeit
Wyoming	0
Wyoming	6
August 13 – Game 9
Alaska	0
Montana	1
Oregon	12

== Southeast ==
The tournament took place in Warner Robins, Georgia, during August 6–11. On August 7, the team from North Carolina was removed from further tournament play due to having at least one positive COVID-19 test.

State	City	LL Organization	Record
Alabama	Sylacauga	Sylacauga	0–2
Florida	Palm City	Martin County North	3–1
Georgia	Columbus	Columbus Northern	2–2
North Carolina	Greenville	Greenville Tar Heel	1–2
South Carolina	Taylors	Northwood	2–2
Tennessee	Nolensville	Nolensville	5–1
Virginia	Newport News	Warwick	0–2
West Virginia	Shenandoah Junction	Jefferson County	1–2

August 6 – Game 1
West Virginia	3
Game 7 – Forfeit
North Carolina	4
North Carolina	0
August 6 – Game 2
Florida	6
Florida	7
August 9 – Game 12
Virginia	3
Florida	4
August 6 – Game 3 (F/5)
Georgia	0
Georgia	10
August 7 – Game 8
South Carolina	0
Georgia	6
August 6 – Game 4 (F/3)
Tennessee	5
Tennessee	23
Alabama	0
August 11 – Championship
Florida	3
August 7 – Game 5
Tennessee	10
West Virginia	7
August 8 – Game 9
Virginia	5
West Virginia	3
Tennessee	11
August 9 – Game 11
Tennessee	8
August 7 – Game 6 (F/4)
South Carolina	3
South Carolina	12
Game 10 – Forfeit
Alabama	0
South Carolina	6
North Carolina	0
August 10 – Game 13
Georgia	2
Tennessee	4

== Southwest ==
The tournament took place in Waco, Texas, during August 5–10. On August 6, the teams from Oklahoma, Mississippi, and Texas East were all removed from further tournament play due to each team having at least one positive COVID-19 test. This resulted in a reworking of the schedule, causing the championship game to be moved up a day from its originally planned date of August 11.

State	City	LL Organization	Record
Arkansas	Little Rock	Junior Deputy Baseball	0–2
Colorado	Boulder	North Boulder	2–2
Louisiana	Lafayette	Lafayette	4–0
Mississippi	Starkville	Starkville	0–2
New Mexico	Rio Rancho	Sunset	2–2
Oklahoma	Tulsa	Tulsa National	1–2
Texas East	Needville	Needville	1–2
Texas West	Abilene	Wylie	4–2

August 5 – Game 1
Oklahoma	7
Game 7 – Forfeit
New Mexico	6
Oklahoma	0
August 5 – Game 2
Colorado	6
Colorado	6
August 8 – Game 12
Mississippi	4
Colorado	0
August 5 – Game 3
Louisiana	11
Texas East	13
Game 8 – Forfeit
Arkansas	0
Texas East	0
August 5 – Game 4
Louisiana	6
Louisiana	6
Texas West	1
August 10 – Championship
Louisiana	6
Game 5 – Forfeit
Texas West	2
New Mexico	6
Game 9 – Forfeit
Mississippi	0
Texas East	0
New Mexico	6
August 7 – Game 11
New Mexico	0
August 6 – Game 6 (F/5)
Texas West	7
Arkansas	1
Game 10 – Forfeit
Texas West	11
Oklahoma	0
Texas West	6
August 9 – Game 13
Colorado	0
Texas West	3

== West ==
The tournament took place in San Bernardino, California, during August 8–14. On August 10, the team from Arizona was removed from tournament play due to having at least one positive COVID-19 test.

State	City	LL Organization	Record
Arizona	Queen Creek	Queen Creek	1–2
Hawaii	Honolulu	Honolulu	4–0
Nevada	Las Vegas	Summerlin South	0–2
Northern California	Petaluma	Petaluma National	1–2
Southern California	Torrance	Torrance	3–2
Utah	Washington	Washington	1–2

August 9 – Game 3 (F/4)
Arizona	0
August 8 – Game 1
Northern California	11
Arizona	1
August 12 – Game 8 (F/5)
Southern California	0
Northern California	3
August 8 – Game 2 (F/3)
Hawaii	13
Hawaii	15
August 9 – Game 4
Utah	0
Hawaii	7
Nevada	6
August 14 – Championship
Hawaii	7
August 10 – Game 5 (F/9)
Southern California	2
Southern California	8
August 11 – Game 7
Nevada	6
Southern California	8
Game 6 – Forfeit
Utah	1
Utah	6
August 13 – Game 9 (F/7)
Arizona	0
Northern California	0
Southern California	6
