= 2003 Little League World Series =

Children's baseball tournament

Tournament details
- Dates: August 15–August 24
- Teams: 16

Final positions
- Champions: Musashi-Fuchu Little League; Tokyo, Japan
- Runners-up: East Boynton Beach Little League; Boynton Beach, Florida

The 2003 Little League World Series took place between August 15 and August 24 in South Williamsport, Pennsylvania. The Musashi-Fuchu Little League of Tokyo, Japan, defeated the East Boynton Beach Little League of Boynton Beach, Florida, in the championship game of the 57th Little League World Series.

== Notable players ==
The following LLWS players later appeared in Major League Baseball (MLB):

Player	LLWS team	MLB debut year & team
Randal Grichuk	Richmond, Texas	2014 St. Louis Cardinals
Brady Rodgers	Richmond, Texas	2016 Houston Astros
Jonathan Schoop	Curaçao	2013 Baltimore Orioles
Devon Travis	Boynton Beach, Florida	2015 Toronto Blue Jays

== Teams ==
Between five and twelve qualification games took part in 16 regional qualification tournaments, which varied in format depending on region. In the United States, the qualification tournaments were in the same format as the Little League World Series itself: a round-robin tournament followed by an elimination round to determine the regional champion.

Pool A	Pool B	Pool C	Pool D
(Florida) Boynton Beach, Florida; Southeast; East Boynton Beach Little League	(Delaware) Wilmington, Delaware; Mid-Atlantic; Naamans Little League	(Curaçao) (Netherlands Antilles) Willemstad, Curaçao; Caribbean; Pabao Little League	(Guam) Hagåtña, Guam; Pacific; Central Little League
(Massachusetts) Saugus, Massachusetts; New England; Saugus American Little League	(Iowa) Eldridge, Iowa; Midwest; North Scott Little League	(Canada) (Nova Scotia) Glace Bay, Nova Scotia; Canada; Glace Bay Little League	(Venezuela) Valencia, Venezuela; Latin America; Los Leones
(Ohio) Tallmadge, Ohio; Great Lakes; Tallmadge Little League	(Arizona) Chandler, Arizona; West; Chandler National Little League	(Japan) Tokyo, Japan; Asia; Edogawa Minami	(Mexico) Nuevo Laredo, Mexico; Mexico; Oriente
(Washington (state)) Richland, Washington; Northwest; Richland National Little League	(Texas) Richmond, Texas; Southwest; Lamar Little League	(Saudi Arabia) Dhahran, Saudi Arabia; Transatlantic; Arabian-American	(Russia) Moscow, Russia; Europe, Middle East and Africa (EMEA); Brattevo

- Guam is an organized, unincorporated territory of the United States.

== Pool play ==
The top two teams in each pool moved on to their respective semifinals. The winners of each met on August 24 to play for the Little League world championship.

Pool A
Region	Record
New England	3–0
Southeast	2–1
Great Lakes	1–2
Northwest	0–3

Pool B
Region	Record
West	3–0
Southwest	2–1
Mid-Atlantic	1–2
Midwest	0–3

August 15

New England	2-1	Great Lakes
Southeast	8-1	Northwest

August 16

Southwest	7-2	Midwest
Mid-Atlantic	1-5	West

August 17

Great Lakes	2-7^{†}	Southeast
West	10-4	Southwest
Northwest	1-2	New England
Midwest	7-8	Mid-Atlantic

August 18

Northwest	4-5	Great Lakes
New England	4-3	Southeast

August 19

Southwest	7-1	Mid-Atlantic
West	8-7	Midwest

=== International ===
Pool C
Region	Record
Japan	3–0
Caribbean	2–1
Transatlantic	1–2
Canada	0–3

Pool D
Region	Record
Latin America	3–0
Mexico	2–1
EMEA	1–2
Pacific	0–3

August 15

Caribbean	1-4	Asia

August 16

Latin America	9-0	Pacific
EMEA	1-2	Mexico

August 17

Transatlantic	3-2^{†}	Canada
EMEA	2-0	Pacific

August 18

Caribbean	9-2^{†}	Transatlantic
Pacific	3-11	Mexico
Latin America	7-1	EMEA
Asia	7-0	Canada

August 19

Latin America	6-2	Mexico
Asia	17-0^{‡} (4 innings)	Transatlantic
Caribbean	2-1	Canada

=== Elimination rounds ===
Quarter-finals
August 20 - Lamade
Altagracia, Zulia, Venezuela	0
(Netherlands Antilles) Willemstad, Curaçao	10
August 21 - Lamade
Tokyo, Japan	7
Mexico City	1
August 20 - Lamade
Chandler, Arizona	1
Boynton Beach, Florida	4
August 21 - Lamade
Saugus, Massachusetts	14
Richmond, Texas	13

Semi-finals
August 23 - Lamade
(Netherlands Antilles) Willemstad, Curaçao	6
Tokyo, Japan	14
August 23 - Lamade
Boynton Beach, Florida	9
Saugus, Massachusetts	2

Final
August 24 - Lamade
Tokyo, Japan	10
Boynton Beach, Florida	1
Third place
August 24 - Volunteer
Saugus, Massachusetts	1
(Netherlands Antilles) Willemstad, Curaçao	5

2003 Little League World Series Champions
Musashi-Fuchu Little League
Tokyo, Japan
