= 2019 Little League World Series qualification =

Children's baseball competition qualification

United States
- Great Lakes winner: Bowling Green, Kentucky
- Mid-Atlantic winner: Elizabeth, New Jersey
- Midwest winner: Coon Rapids, Minnesota
- New England winner: Barrington, Rhode Island
- Northwest winner: Salem, Oregon
- Southeast winner: South Riding, Virginia
- Southwest winner: River Ridge, Louisiana
- West winner: Wailuku, Hawaii

International
- Asia-Pacific and Middle East winner: Chungcheong, South Korea
- Australia winner: (Australia) Sydney, New South Wales
- Canada winner: (Canada) Coquitlam, British Columbia
- Caribbean winner: Willemstad, Curaçao
- Europe and Africa winner: Bologna, Italy
- Japan winner: (Japan) Tokyo
- Latin America winner: Maracaibo, Venezuela
- Mexico winner: (Mexico) Guadalupe, Nuevo León

Tournaments

Qualification for the 2019 Little League World Series took place in eight United States regions and eight international regions from June through August 2019.

== United States ==
All eight regional tournaments will follow a modified double elimination format. The regional finals will be a single game.

=== Great Lakes ===
The tournament took place in Westfield, Indiana from August 4–10.

State	City	LL Organization	Record
Illinois	River Forest	River Forest Youth	4–2
Indiana	Sellersburg	Silver Creek	1–2
Kentucky	Bowling Green	Bowling Green Eastern	3–0
Michigan	Bay City	Bay City Northwest	1–2
Ohio	Hamilton	West Side	0–2
Wisconsin	Glendale	Glendale	1–2

August 5 – Game 3 (F/4)
Indiana	4
August 4 – Game 1 (F/7)
Kentucky	15
Ohio	3
August 8 – Game 8
Indiana	4
Kentucky	5
August 4 – Game 2
Michigan	3
Wisconsin	3
August 5 – Game 4
Illinois	7
Illinois	5
Michigan	13
August 10 – Championship
Kentucky	15
August 6 – Game 5
Illinois	6
Ohio	3
August 7 – Game 7
Illinois	6
Illinois	10
August 6 – Game 6 (F/3)
Wisconsin	4
Wisconsin	15
August 9 – Game 9
Indiana	0
Michigan	2
Illinois	4

=== Mid-Atlantic ===
The tournament took place in Bristol, Connecticut from August 4–10.

State	City	LL Organization	Record
Delaware	Newark	Newark National	0–2
Maryland	Fruitland	Fruitland	0–2
New Jersey	Elizabeth	Elmora Youth	5–1
New York	Haverstraw	Haverstraw	3–1
Pennsylvania	Enola	East Pennsboro	1–2
Washington, D.C.		Northwest Washington	1–2

August 5 – Game 3
New Jersey	7
August 4 – Game 1
Washington, D.C.	8
Pennsylvania	0
August 8 – Game 8 (F/4)
New Jersey	1
Washington, D.C.	4
August 4 – Game 2
New York	15
New York	9
August 5 – Game 4 (F/8)
Maryland	2
New York	9
Delaware	6
August 10 – Championship
New York	4
August 6 – Game 5
New Jersey	19
Pennsylvania	7
August 7 – Game 7
Delaware	0
Pennsylvania	0
August 6 – Game 6
New Jersey	4
Maryland	1
August 9 – Game 9
New Jersey	4
Washington, D.C.	0
New Jersey	5

=== Midwest ===
The tournament took place in Westfield, Indiana from August 3–10. For the first time, North Dakota and South Dakota are sending separate teams to the tournament; in previous years one team represented both states.

State	City	LL Organization	Record
Iowa	Johnston	Johnston	3–1
Kansas	Pittsburg	J.L. Hutchinson Baseball	0–2
Minnesota	Coon Rapids	Coon Rapids Andover American	4–1
Missouri	Webb City	Webb City	3–2
Nebraska	Kearney	Kearney	0–2
North Dakota	Fargo	Fargo	2–2
South Dakota	Rapid City	Canyon Lake	0–2

August 4 – Game 4
South Dakota	4
August 3 – Game 1
Minnesota	8
Nebraska	7
August 8 – Game 10
Minnesota	15
Minnesota	1
August 3 – Game 2
Iowa	3
Missouri	1
August 4 – Game 5
Iowa	2
Iowa	3
August 3 – Game 3
North Dakota	0
North Dakota	8
Kansas	0
August 10 – Championship
Iowa	6
August 5 – Game 6
Minnesota	8
Missouri	3
August 6 – Game 8
Kansas	1
Missouri	5
South Dakota	2
August 7 – Game 9 (F/7)
Missouri	6
North Dakota	3
August 6 – Game 7 (F/8)
Nebraska	3
North Dakota	6
August 9 – Game 11
Minnesota	9
Missouri	0

=== New England ===
The tournament took place in Bristol, Connecticut from August 4–10.

State	City	LL Organization	Record
Connecticut	Madison	Madison	2–2
Maine	Lewiston	Lewiston	1–2
Massachusetts	Walpole	Walpole	1–2
New Hampshire	Goffstown	Goffstown Junior Baseball	2–1
Rhode Island	Barrington	Barrington	3–1
Vermont	Bradford	Connecticut Valley North	1–2

August 5 – Game 3
Massachusetts	0
August 4 – Game 1
New Hampshire	3
Massachusetts	6
August 8 – Game 8
Maine	0
New Hampshire	2
August 4 – Game 2
Rhode Island	1
Connecticut	3
August 5 – Game 4 (F/7)
Vermont	6
Vermont	4
Rhode Island	6
August 10 – Championship
New Hampshire	4
August 6 – Game 5
Rhode Island	6
Maine	5
August 7 – Game 7
Vermont	4
Maine	1
August 6 – Game 6
Connecticut	6
Connecticut	4
August 9 – Game 9
Massachusetts	1
Rhode Island	4
Connecticut	0

=== Northwest ===
The tournament took place in San Bernardino, California August 4–10.

State	City	LL Organization	Record
Alaska	Sitka	Sitka	0–2
Idaho	Coeur d'Alene	Coeur d'Alene	2–2
Montana	Billings	Heights National	2–2
Oregon	Salem	Sprague	3–0
Washington	Bothell	North Bothell	3–2
Wyoming	Gillette	Gillette	0–2

August 5 – Game 3
Washington	2
August 4 – Game 1
Idaho	5
Wyoming	2
August 8 – Game 8
Washington	14
Idaho	5
August 4 – Game 2
Oregon	8
Montana	1
August 5 – Game 4
Alaska	0
Montana	7
Oregon	8
August 10 – Championship
Oregon	5
August 6 – Game 5 (F/3)
Idaho	4
Wyoming	0
August 7 – Game 7
Montana	20
Montana	2
August 6 – Game 6
Washington	9
Alaska	3
August 9 – Game 9
Washington	13
Idaho	14
Washington	9

=== Southeast ===
The tournament took place in Warner Robins, Georgia from August 2–7.

State	City	LL Organization	Record
Alabama	Huntsville	Huntsville American	0–2
Florida	Melbourne	Viera/Suntree	2–2
Georgia	Peachtree City	Peachtree City National	3–2
North Carolina	Wilson	Wilson City	0–2
South Carolina	Taylors	Northwood	3–2
Tennessee	Goodlettsville	Goodlettsville Baseball	1–2
Virginia	South Riding	Loudoun South American	4–0
West Virginia	Hurricane	Hurricane	1–2

August 2 – Game 1
Tennessee	7
August 3 – Game 7
South Carolina	9
South Carolina	3
August 2 – Game 2
Virginia	12
North Carolina	1
August 5 – Game 12
Virginia	7
Virginia	6
August 2 – Game 3 (F/5)
Georgia	5
Alabama	1
August 3 – Game 8
Florida	11
Florida	1
August 2 – Game 4 (F/4)
Georgia	2
Georgia	23
West Virginia	0
August 7 – Championship
Virginia	12
August 3 – Game 5
Georgia	2
Tennessee	5
August 4 – Game 9 (F/4)
North Carolina	3
Tennessee	0
Florida	10
August 5 – Game 11
Florida	1
August 3 – Game 6
South Carolina	5
Alabama	0
August 4 – Game 10
West Virginia	7
West Virginia	1
South Carolina	2
August 7 – Game 13
Georgia	10
South Carolina	1

=== Southwest ===
The tournament took place in Waco, Texas August 1–7.

State	City	LL Organization	Record
Arkansas	White Hall	White Hall	0–2
Colorado	Rifle	Colorado River Valley	0–2
Louisiana	River Ridge	Eastbank	4–0
Mississippi	Starkville	Starkville	1–2
New Mexico	Carlsbad	Shorthorn	2–2
Oklahoma	Tulsa	Tulsa National	3–2
Texas East	Houston	Post Oak	1–2
Texas West	Midland	Midland Northern	3–2

August 1 – Game 1
Texas West	11
August 3 – Game 7
Oklahoma	3
Texas West	6
August 1 – Game 2
New Mexico	3
New Mexico	6
August 5 – Game 12
Colorado	3
Texas West	5
August 1 – Game 3 (F/4)
Louisiana	6
Mississippi	3
August 3 – Game 8
Texas East	13
Texas East	1
August 1 – Game 4 (F/4)
Louisiana	4
Arkansas	0
Louisiana	11
August 7 – Championship
Louisiana	6
August 2 – Game 5
Texas West	2
Oklahoma	9
August 4 – Game 9
Colorado	0
Texas East	0
Oklahoma	5
August 5 – Game 11 (F/5)
Oklahoma	10
August 2 – Game 6
New Mexico	0
Mississippi	9
August 4 – Game 10
Arkansas	8
New Mexico	6
Mississippi	3
August 6 – Game 13
Texas West	5
Oklahoma	2

=== West ===
The tournament took place in San Bernardino, California August 4–10.

State	City	LL Organization	Record
Arizona	Tucson	Sunnyside	3–2
Hawaii	Wailuku	Central East Maui	4–0
Nevada	Henderson	Paseo Verde	0–2
Northern California	Roseville	Maidu	2–2
Southern California	Bonita	Sweetwater Valley	1–2
Utah	Washington	Washington	0–2

August 5 – Game 3
Northern California	17
August 4 – Game 1
Utah	5
Nevada	0
August 8 – Game 8 (F/5)
Northern California	3
Northern California	3
August 4 – Game 2
Hawaii	13
Hawaii	4
August 5 – Game 4 (F/8)
Southern California	2
Hawaii	6
Arizona	5
August 10 – Championship
Hawaii	4
August 6 – Game 5 (F/4)
Arizona	1
Nevada	1
August 7 – Game 7
Arizona	13
Arizona	8
August 6 – Game 6 (F/5)
Southern California	6
Southern California	15
August 9 – Game 9
Utah	2
Northern California	2
Arizona	3

== International ==
=== Asia-Pacific ===
The tournament took place in Hwaseong, South Korea from June 22–28. The top two teams from each pool advanced to the semifinals.

==== Pool play ====
===== Pool A =====
Pos	Team	Pld	W	L	RF	RA	RD	Qualification
1	South Korea	5	5	0	62	6	+56	Advance to knockout round
2	Philippines	5	4	1	26	25	+1	Advance to knockout round
3	China	5	3	2	31	17	+14	
4	Indonesia	5	1	4	8	27	−19	
5	Guam	5	1	4	13	42	−29	
6	Thailand	5	1	4	27	50	−23	

===== Pool B =====
Pos	Team	Pld	W	L	RF	RA	RD	Qualification
1	Chinese Taipei (Note: Republic of China, commonly known as Taiwan, due to complicated relations with People's Republic of China, is recognized by the name Chinese Taipei by majority of international organizations including Little League Baseball (LLB). For more information, please see Cross-Strait relations.)	4	4	0	57	0	+57	Advance to knockout round
2	Hong Kong	4	2	2	27	20	+7	Advance to knockout round
3	Northern Mariana Islands	4	2	2	25	21	+4	
4	New Zealand	4	2	2	23	25	−2	
5	Vietnam	4	0	4	2	68	−66	

==== Knockout round ====
Semi-finals
June 27 – Hwaseong
1A South Korea	9
2B Hong Kong	0
June 27 – Hwaseong (F/4)
1B Chinese Taipei	15
2A Philippines	0

Asia-Pacific Championship
June 28 – Hwaseong
1A South Korea	7
1B Chinese Taipei	2

=== Australia ===
The tournament took place in Lismore, New South Wales from June 6–10. The top two teams in each pool advanced to the elimination round.

==== Pool round ====
===== Pool A =====
Pos	Team	Pld	W	L	RF	RA	RD	Qualification
1	(New South Wales) Hills Red	3	2	1	31	28	+3	Advance to knockout round
2	(Queensland) Gold Coast	3	2	1	26	22	+4	Advance to knockout round
3	(South Australia) Adelaide Marlins	3	1	2	30	34	−4	
4	(Victoria (state)) Southern Mariners	3	1	2	11	14	−3	

===== Pool B =====
Pos	Team	Pld	W	L	RF	RA	RD	Qualification
1	(Western Australia) Perth Metro East	3	3	0	29	11	+18	Advance to knockout round
2	(New South Wales) Manly	3	2	1	26	14	+12	Advance to knockout round
3	(Victoria (state)) Eastern Athletics	3	1	2	21	32	−11	
4	(South Australia) Adelaide Rays	3	0	3	10	29	−19	

===== Pool C =====
Pos	Team	Pld	W	L	RF	RA	RD	Qualification
1	(New South Wales) Cronulla	3	3	0	35	13	+22	Advance to knockout round
2	(Western Australia) Perth Metro North	3	2	1	22	20	+2	Advance to knockout round
3	(Victoria (state)) Northwestern Twins	3	1	2	30	24	+6	
4	(Australian Capital Territory) Canberra	3	0	3	10	40	−30	

===== Pool D =====
Pos	Team	Pld	W	L	RF	RA	RD	Qualification
1	(New South Wales) Ryde Red	3	3	0	35	8	+27	Advance to knockout round
2	(New South Wales) Far North Coast	3	2	1	20	19	+1	Advance to knockout round
3	(Queensland) Brisbane North	3	1	2	11	31	−20	
4	(Western Australia) Perth Metro Central	3	0	3	17	25	−8	

==== Knockout round ====
Quarter-finals
June 8 – Lismore (F/4)
1A (New South Wales) Hills Red	10
2D (New South Wales) Far North Coast	0
June 8 – Lismore
1C (New South Wales) Cronulla	9
2B (New South Wales) Manly	5
June 8 – Lismore
1B (Western Australia) Perth Metro East	5
2C (Western Australia) Perth Metro North	4
June 8 – Lismore
1D (New South Wales) Ryde Red	3
2A (Queensland) Gold Coast	2

Semi-finals
June 9 – Lismore
1A (New South Wales) Hills Red	4
1C (New South Wales) Cronulla	8
June 9 – Lismore (F/7)
1B (Western Australia) Perth Metro East	2
1D (New South Wales) Ryde Red	6

Australia Championship
June 10 – Lismore
1C (New South Wales) Cronulla	5
1D (New South Wales) Ryde Red	2

=== Canada ===
The tournament took place in Ancaster, Ontario from August 1–10. The top four teams will advance to the semifinals.

Province	City	LL Organization	Record
Quebec	Mirabel	Diamond Baseball Academy	5–1
British Columbia	Coquitlam	Coquitlam	5–1
Ontario	Ottawa	Ottawa West	4–2
Alberta	Calgary	Calgary West	3–3
Nova Scotia	Glace Bay	Glace Bay	2–4
Ontario (Host)	Ancaster	Ancaster	1–5
Saskatchewan	Moose Jaw	Moose Jaw	1–5

Semi-finals
August 9 – Ancaster
1 Quebec	8
4 Alberta	7
August 9 – Ancaster
2 British Columbia	8
3 Ontario	5

Canada Championship
August 10 – Ancaster
1 Quebec	3
2 British Columbia	6

=== Caribbean ===
The tournament took place in Willemstad, Curaçao from July 13–20. The top two teams from each pool advance to the semifinals.

Pool A
Country	City	LL Organization	Record
Curaçao A	Willemstad	Pabao	4–0
Aruba	San Nicolaas	Aruba South	3–1
Puerto Rico	San Juan	Piratas De Venezuela	2–2
US Virgin Islands	St. Thomas	Elrod Hendricks West	1–3
Sint Maarten		Saint Maarten	0–4

Pool B
Country	City	LL Organization	Record
Curacao B	Willemstad	Pariba	5–0
Cuba	Havana	Havana	4–1
Bahamas	Nassau	Junior Nassau	3–2
Dominican Republic	Santo Domingo	La Javilla	2–3
Bonaire		Bonaire	1–4
Antigua and Barbuda	St. John's	Antigua	0–5

Semi-finals
July 19 – Willemstad
1A (Curaçao) Curacao A	2
2B Cuba	0
July 19 – Willemstad
1B (Curaçao) Curacao B	4
2A Aruba	2

Caribbean Championship
July 20 – Willemstad
1A (Curaçao) Curacao A	8
1B (Curaçao) Curacao B	3

=== Europe and Africa ===
The Europe-Africa qualifier tournament took place from July 12–16. The format of the qualifier tournament is a round robin with an elimination round where the two semifinal winners advanced to the double-elimination regional tournament from July 19–26. Both tournaments took place in Kutno, Poland.

==== Qualifier tournament ====
Teams
Country	Record
Croatia	4–0
Switzerland	3–1
Belgium	2–2
Hungary	1–3
Poland	0–4

Semi-finals
July 15 – Kutno
1 Croatia	17
4 Hungary	2
July 15 – Kutno
2 Switzerland	1
3 Belgium	8

Qualifier Championship
July 16 – Kutno
1 Croatia	15
3 Belgium	4

==== Regional tournament ====
Teams
Country	City	LL Organization	Record
Austria	Vienna	East Austria	1–2
Belgium	Brussels	Brussels	1–2
Belarus	Skidel	Sugar Storm	0–2
Croatia	Karlovac	Croatia North	0–2
Czech Republic	Brno	South Czech Republic	2–2
France	Paris	Ile-De-France	0–2
(United States) Germany-US	Ramstein AFB	KMC American	4–2
Italy	Bologna	Emilia Romagna	4–0
Lithuania	Kaunas	Kaunas	0–2
Netherlands	Amsterdam	Amsterdam	4–2
Spain	Barcelona	Catalunya	2–2
Ukraine	Kyiv	Kyiv Baseball School	1–2
United Kingdom	London	South East	5–2

Results
July 19
Game	Visitor	Score	Home
1	Belgium (0–1)	6–8	Austria (1–0)
2	Belarus (0–1)	0–7	United Kingdom (1–0)
3	Spain (1–0)	13–1	(United States) Germany-USA (0–1)
4	France (0–1)	0–10	Czech Republic (1–0)
5	Netherlands (1–0)	11–0	Ukraine (0–1)
July 20
Game	Visitor	Score	Home
6	Italy (1–0)	10–0	Austria (1–1)
7	United Kingdom (1–1)	2–7	Spain (2–0)
8	Lithuania (0–1)	1–2	Czech Republic (2–0)
9	Croatia (0–1)	0–16	Netherlands (2–0)
10	Belarus (0–2)	1–8	(United States) Germany-USA (1–1)
July 21
Game	Visitor	Score	Home
11	Belgium (1–1)	10–1	Croatia (0–2)
12	Ukraine (1–1)	6–4	Austria (1–2)
13	France (0–2)	1–6	United Kingdom (2–1)
14	(United States) Germany-USA (2–1)	14–3	Lithuania (0–2)
July 22
Game	Visitor	Score	Home
15	Italy (2–0)	8–6	Spain (2–1)
16	Czech Republic (2–1)	0–1	Netherlands (3–0)
17	Belgium (1–2)	4–19	(United States) Germany-USA (3–1)
18	Ukraine (1–2)	3–8	United Kingdom (3–1)
July 23
Game	Visitor	Score	Home
19	(United States) Germany-USA (4–1)	4–3	Spain (2–2)
20	United Kingdom (4–1)	6–2	Czech Republic (2–2)
21	Italy (3–0)	8–1	Netherlands (3–1)
July 24
Game	Visitor	Score	Home
22	(United States) Germany-USA (4–2)	2–12	United Kingdom (5–1)
July 25
Game	Visitor	Score	Home
23	United Kingdom (5–2)	3–6	Netherlands (4–1)
July 26
Game	Visitor	Score	Home
24	Italy (4–0)	1–0	Netherlands (4–2)

=== Japan ===
This single elimination tournament took place in Ueda, Nagano from July 19–22.

Participating teams	Prefecture	City	LL Organization
Chūgoku Champions	Hiroshima	Hiroshima	Hiroshima Aki
Higashikanto Champions	Ibaraki	Ushiku	Ushiku
Hokkaido Champions	Hokkaido	Sapporo	Sapporo Shinkotoni
Kanagawa Champions	Kanagawa	Hiratsuka	Hiratsuka
Kansai Champions	Osaka	Osaka	Osaka City
Kansai Runner-up	Hyogo	Hyogo	Hyogo Harima
Kitakanto Champions	Saitama	Fukaya	Fukaya City
Kyushu Champions	Nagasaki	Nagasaki	Nagasaki
Shikoku Champions	Ehime	Niihama	Niihama
Shin'etsu Champions	Nagano	Matsumoto	Hata
Shin'etsu Runner-up	Nagano	Ueda	Ueda
Tōhoku Champions	Miyagi	Sendai	Sendai Higashi
Tōhoku Runner-up	Miyagi	Sendai	Sendai Aoba
Tōkai Champions	Shizuoka	Hamamatsu	Hamamatsu Minami
Tōkai Runner-up	Aichi	Nagoya	Meito Chikusa
Tokyo Champions	Tokyo	Tokyo	Chofu

Opening Round
July 20 – Ueda
(Miyagi Prefecture) Sendai Higashi	1
(Tokyo) Chofu	12
July 20 – Ueda
(Nagasaki Prefecture) Nagasaki	4
(Nagano Prefecture) Ueda	11
July 20 – Ueda
(Ehime Prefecture) Niihama	2
(Hyōgo Prefecture) Hyogo Harima	7
July 20 – Ueda
(Hokkaido) Sapporo Shinkotoni	2
(Shizuoka Prefecture) Hamamatsu Minami	10
July 20 – Ueda
(Ibaraki Prefecture) Ushiku	12
(Hiroshima Prefecture) Hiroshima Aki	5
July 20 – Ueda
(Saitama Prefecture) Fukuyama City	3
(Nagano Prefecture) Hata	2
July 20 – Ueda
(Kanagawa Prefecture) Hiratsuka	6
(Osaka Prefecture) Osaka City	3
July 20 – Ueda
(Miyagi Prefecture) Sendai Aoba	2
(Aichi Prefecture) Meito Chikusa	9

Quarterfinals
July 20 – Ueda
(Tokyo) Chofu	11
(Nagano Prefecture) Ueda	0
July 20 – Ueda
(Hyōgo Prefecture) Hyogo Harima	6
(Shizuoka Prefecture) Hamamatsu Minami	7
July 20 – Ueda
(Ibaraki Prefecture) Ushiku	8
(Saitama Prefecture) Fukuyama City	1
July 20– Ueda
(Kanagawa Prefecture) Hiratsuka	5
(Aichi Prefecture) Meito Chikusa	4

Semifinals
July 21 – Ueda
(Tokyo) Chofu	6
(Shizuoka Prefecture) Hamamatsu Minami	0
July 21 – Ueda
(Ibaraki Prefecture) Ushiku	5
(Kanagawa Prefecture) Hiratsuka	4

Japan Championship
July 22 – Ueda
(Tokyo) Chofu	8
(Ibaraki Prefecture) Ushiku	0

=== Latin America ===
The tournament took place in Aguadulce, Panama from July 6–13. The top four teams advanced to the semifinals.

Country	City	LL Organization	Record
Panama A	Aguadulce	Aguadulce Cabezera	3–1
Venezuela	Maracaibo	Cacique Mara	3–1
Colombia	Cartagena	Falcon	2–2
Panama B	David	David Doleguita	2–2
Costa Rica	Santo Domingo	Santo Domingo de Heredia	0–4

Semi-finals
July 12 – Aguadulce
1 Panama A	1
4 Panama B	3
July 12 – Aguadulce
2 Venezuela	9
3 Colombia	2

Latin America Championship
July 13 – Aguadulce
4 Panama	0
2 Venezuela	2

=== Mexico ===
The tournament took place in Sabinas from July 6–12. The top two teams from each pool advanced to the semifinals.

Pool A
State	City	LL Organization	Record
Tamaulipas	Nuevo Laredo	Oriente	5–1
Veracruz	Medellín de Bravo	Infantil y Juvenil Veracruzana	5–1
Nuevo León	San Nicolás de los Garza	San Nicolás	4–2
Sonora	Guaymas	Sector Pesca de Guaymas	4–2
Chihuahua	Ciudad Juárez	Satélite	2–4
Coahuila	Monclova	Ribereña	1–5
Coahuila	Saltillo	Saltillo	0–6

Pool B
State	City	LL Organization	Record
Nuevo León	Guadalupe	Epitacio "Mala" Torres	4–1
Tamaulipas	Matamoros	Matamoros A.C.	4–1
Chihuahua	Parral	Deporte Asociado San Uriel	3–2
Veracruz	Coatzacoalcos	Infantil y juvenil Coatzacoalcos	3–2
Jalisco	Jalisco	Pegueros	1–4
Coahuila	Sabinas	Infantil y Juvenil de Sabinas Coah.	0–5

Semi-finals
July 11 – Sabinas
1A (Tamaulipas) Oriente	3
2B (Tamaulipas) Matamoros A.C.	8
July 11 – Sabinas
1B (Nuevo León) Epitacio "Mala" Torres	5
2A (Veracruz) Infantil y Juvenil Veracruzana	1

Mexico Championship
July 12 – Sabinas
2B (Tamaulipas) Matamoros A.C.	1
1B (Nuevo León) Epitacio "Mala" Torres	3
