= 2013 Little League World Series =

Children's baseball tournament

Tournament details
- Dates: August 15–August 25
- Teams: 16

Final positions
- Champions: (Japan) Musashi-Fuchū Little League; Tokyo
- Runners-up: (United States) Eastlake Little League; Chula Vista, California

The 2013 Little League World Series was held in South Williamsport, Pennsylvania, from August 15 until August 25. Eight teams from the United States and eight from throughout the world competed in the 67th edition of the Little League World Series (LLWS). The Musashi-Fuchū Little League of Tokyo, Japan, defeated the Eastlake Little League of Chula Vista, California, 6–4 in the championship game. For Japan, this was their ninth LLWS championship overall, second consecutive, and the third in four years. This was the last LLWS to feature players born in the 20th century.

== Tournament changes ==
It was announced on August 29, 2012 that three of the eight international regions had been realigned. The results of the realignment included Australia having its own region, meaning that the national champion of that country would be given a berth into the Little League World Series. Also, teams from Middle Eastern countries (except Israel and Turkey) would compete to qualify with teams in the Asia-Pacific Region to form the Asia-Pacific and Middle East region. Teams from Africa would compete to qualify with teams from Europe to form the Europe and Africa region.

== Teams ==
| United States | International |
|---|---|
| Grosse Pointe Woods, Michigan; Great Lakes Region; Grosse Pointe Woods-Shores Little League | Taoyuan, Chinese Taipei; Asia-Pacific and Middle East Region; Chung-Ping Little League |
| Newark, Delaware; Mid-Atlantic Region; Newark National Little League | Perth, Western Australia; Australia Region; Perth Metro Central Little League |
| Urbandale, Iowa; Midwest Region; Urbandale Little League | Nepean, Ontario; Canada Region; East Nepean Little League |
| Westport, Connecticut; New England Region; Westport Little League | San Lorenzo, Puerto Rico; Caribbean Region; Samaritana Little League |
| (Washington (state)) Sammamish, Washington; Northwest Region; Eastlake Little League | Brno, Czech Republic; Europe and Africa Region; South Moravia Little League |
| Nashville, Tennessee; Southeast Region; South Nashville Little League | Fuchū, Tokyo; Japan Region; Musashi Fuchū Little League |
| Corpus Christi, Texas; Southwest Region; Universal Little League | Aguadulce, Panama; Latin America Region; Aguadulce Cabezera Little League |
| Chula Vista, California; West Region; Eastlake Little League | Tijuana, Baja California; Mexico Region; Municipal De Tijuana Little League |

- Taiwan participates under the name Chinese Taipei in many sporting events, including Little League Baseball (LLB).

== Team rosters ==
International
| Asia-Pacific Taoyuan, Chinese Taipei | Australia (Western Australia) Perth, WA | Canada (Ontario) Nepean, ON | Caribbean San Lorenzo, Puerto Rico | Europe-Africa Brno, Czech Republic | Japan Fuchu, Tokyo | Latin America Aguadulce, Panama | Mexico Tijuana, Baja California |
|---|---|---|---|---|---|---|---|
| Shih-Che Chou Shao-Hua Chung Yu-Chun Chung Chao-Wei Huang Huai-Chien Lan Chen-Hsun Lee Shu-Ming Lee Chia-Ming Lin Teng-Yu Wang Kai-En Wu Tung-Hua Yeh Ching-Fong Yu Teng-Yao Yu | Zachariah Artingstall Mitchell Brown Chase Diggins Kieren Hall Maverick Hamilton Caydyn Hancock Todd Hatcher Luke Houston Danny Ivester Jake Sheldon Zane Tavinor Michael Tovey Shane Turner Dylan Walsh | Angus Adams David Caon Cole Dennison Justin Dineen Davide Disipio Caden Griffin David Legault Kai Nguyen Ken Nguyen Will Riopelle Clay Surrett Jack Walsh Jason Zhang | Robert Addarich Pedro Aponte Edgar Baez Yan Contreras Braulio Flores Leonardo Lizardi Yamil Munoz Jan Osorio Pablo Sanchez Gabriel Santiago Tommylee Sierra Israel Velazquez Yamil Velazquez | Tomas Chadim Christian Geidl Lukas Hlouch Krystof Jan Hruza Tomas Jurcik Marek Krejcirik Tomas Kuba Eliska Stejskalova Daniel Stoudek Martin Svihalek Robin Vavra Victor Vecerka | Takuma Gomi Ryusei Hirooka Kazuki Ishida Kyousuke Kobayashi Sho Miyao Kouyou Mizushima Tatsuki Nagano Seiya Nishino Dai Okada Keita Saito Jintarou Shiina Shunpei Takagi Ryutarro Takeo Kensuke Tsuchida | Jordan Agrazal Jean Cornejo Juan Crisp Carmelo Cruz Radameth De Leon Rafael Eysseric Daniel Fernandez Jose Gonzalez Armando Lopez Daniel Polo Edgardo Rosales Azarel Salado Jean Mar Sanchez Tomas Sarmiento | Alexander Artalejo Miguel Artalejo Luis Corral Jorge Duenas Saul Favela Martin Gonzalez Axcel Mandujano Luis Manzo Ramon Mendoza Brandon Meza Brandon Montes Jorge Rodriguez Jorge Romero |

United States
| Great Lakes (Michigan) Grosse Pointe, MI | Mid-Atlantic (Delaware) Newark, DE | Midwest (Iowa) Urbandale, IA | New England (Connecticut) Westport, CT | Northwest (Washington (state)) Sammamish, WA | Southeast (Tennessee) Nashville, TN | Southwest (Texas) Corpus Christi, TX | West (California) Chula Vista, CA |
|---|---|---|---|---|---|---|---|
| Louis Cardinale John Cullen Ryan Duffy Tyler Hill John Lizza Chad Lorkowski Thomas Maxey James Mazzola Antonio Moceri Joseph Rheaume Ryan Shanley Jack Vyletel Evan Zschering | Brett Callahan Justin Courter Joseph Davis Brian Green Jack Hardcastle Nathan Hardcastle David Hawtof Eric Ludman Ryan Miller Jared Owens Brandon Sengphachanh Nick Sharpe | Alex Augustine Brenden Ball Chase Brundage Ty Cowley Grant Garwood Brook Heinen Joshua Neyens Will Pattison Sam Petrillo Garrett Purcell Brady Roberts Lucas Strain Carter Troncin Sam Young | Harry Azadian Matt Brown Christopher Drbal Chad Knight Tatin Llamas Ricky Offenberg Max Popken Alex Reiner Drew Rogers Charlie Roof Matt Stone | Will Armbruester Cameron Bowers Adam Carper Jack Carper Dalton Chandler Jacob Dahlstrom Bryce Delay Nathan Fitzgibbons Jack Matheson Dylan Matsuoka Austin Oh Zack Olson Jack Rud Jack Titus | Zane Denton Robert Hassell Austin Kasick Blake Kirchenbauer Chris McElvain Trae McLemore Blake Money Tanner Morgan Ben Pickman Knox Preston Bricen Russell Conner Smith | Ruben Cortez Jared Cruz Brandon DeLeon Evan Elizaldi Jacob Garza Oscar Hernandez Juan Jasso Jesus Ortiz Josh Ramirez Lonnie Rocha Christian Servantes Juan Rosa | Patrick Archer Kevin Bateman II Giancarlo Cortez Jake Espinoza Michael Gaines Dominic Haley Grant Holman Nick Mora Charly Peterson Micah Pietila-Wiggs (Note: Micah Pietila-Wiggs of Eastlake Little League (Chula Vista) died in a car crash in January 2022.) Ricky Tibbett Rennard Williams |

== Results ==
The drawing to determine the opening round pairings took place on June 13, 2013.

=== United States bracket ===
Upper round 1 | Upper round 2 | Upper final | Final
August 15 – Game 2
Delaware | 6
August 18 – Game 14 (F/4)
Iowa | 3
Delaware | 3
August 15 – Game 4 (F/7)
California | 15
California | 3
August 21 – Game 24 (F/9)
Michigan | 0
California | 6
August 16 – Game 6
Connecticut | 3
Texas | 4
August 18 – Game 16
(Washington (state)) Washington | 8
Washington | 7
August 16 – Game 8
Connecticut | 9
Tennessee | 2 | August 24 – U.S. championship
Connecticut | 3 | California | 12
Connecticut | 1
Lower round 1 | Lower round 2 | Lower round 3 | Lower final
August 19 – Game 18
August 17 – Game 10 | Iowa | 5 | August 23 – Game 26 (F/7)
Iowa | 6 | Washington | 6 | August 20 – Game 22 | Connecticut | 14
Michigan | 5 | Washington | 6 | Washington | 13
August 19 – Game 20 (F/4) | Tennessee | 5
August 17 – Game 12 | Delaware | 0
Texas | 2 | Tennessee | 10
Tennessee | 10

=== International bracket ===
Upper round 1 | Upper round 2 | Upper final | Final
August 15 – Game 1
Panama | 9
August 18 – Game 13 (F/4)
Puerto Rico | 4
Panama | 0
August 15 – Game 3 (F/4)
Mexico | 13
Australia | 0
August 21 – Game 23
Mexico | 12
Mexico | 2
August 16 – Game 5
Japan | 5
Chinese Taipei | 10
August 18 – Game 15
Canada | 2
Chinese Taipei | 2
August 16 – Game 7
Japan | 3
Japan | 7 | August 24 – Intl. championship
Czech Republic | 3 | Japan | 3
Mexico | 2
Lower round 1 | Lower round 2 | Lower round 3 | Lower final
August 19 – Game 17
August 17 – Game 9 | Chinese Taipei | 6 | August 22 – Game 25 (F/7)
Puerto Rico | 4 | Puerto Rico | 4 | August 20 – Game 21 | Mexico | 4
Australia | 0 | Chinese Taipei | 7 | Panama | 2
August 19 – Game 19 (F/4) | Panama | 8
August 17 – Game 11 | Canada | 0
Canada | 4 | Panama | 12
Czech Republic | 3

=== Crossover games ===
Teams that lost their first two games played a crossover game against a team from the other side of the bracket that also lost its first two games. These games were labeled Game A and Game B. This provided teams who were already eliminated the opportunity to play a third game.

| Game A |
| August 19 – Lamade Stadium |
| Australia | 2 |
| Texas | 5 |

| Game B |
| August 20 – Lamade Stadium |
| Czech Republic | 5 |
| Michigan | 3 |

=== Consolation game ===
The consolation game is played between the loser of the United States championship and the loser of the International championship.

| Consolation game |
| August 25 – Lamade Stadium |
| Connecticut | 14 |
| Mexico | 15 |

=== World Championship ===
| Little League World Championship |
| August 25 – Lamade Stadium |
| California | 4 |
| Japan | 6 |

2013 Little League World Series Champions
Musashi-Fuchū Little League
Tokyo, Japan

== Home run count ==
| Name | HR Count | Team |
|---|---|---|
| Brandon Montes | 5 | Mexico |
| Ramon Mendoza | 4 | Mexico |
| Chad Knight | 3 | New England |
| Nick Mora | 3 | West |
| Angus Adams | 2 | Canada |
| Harry Azadian | 2 | New England |
| Matt Brown | 2 | New England |
| Jared Cruz | 2 | Southwest |
| Saul Favela | 2 | Mexico |
| Takuma Gomi | 2 | Japan |
| Grant Holman | 2 | West |
| Kazuki Ishida | 2 | Japan |
| Ricky Offenberg | 2 | New England |
| Ben Pickman | 2 | Southeast |
| Daniel Stoudek | 2 | Europe-Africa |
| Shunpei Takagi | 2 | Japan |
| Miguel Artalejo | 1 | Mexico |
| Jack Carper | 1 | Northwest |
| Shih-Che Chou | 1 | Asia-Pacific |
| Juan Crisp | 1 | Latin America |
| Zane Denton | 1 | Southeast |
| Jake Espinoza | 1 | West |
| Daniel Fernandez | 1 | Latin America |
| Michael Gaines | 1 | West |
| Jacob Garza | 1 | Southwest |
| Martin Gonzalez | 1 | Mexico |
| Brook Heinen | 1 | Midwest |
| Huai-Chien Lan | 1 | Asia-Pacific |
| Tatin Llamas | 1 | New England |
| Armando Lopez | 1 | Latin America |
| Thomas Maxey | 1 | Great Lakes |
| Trae McLemore | 1 | Southeast |
| Antonio Moceri | 1 | Great Lakes |
| Seiya Nishino | 1 | Japan |
| Micah Pietila-Wiggs | 1 | West |
| Max Popken | 1 | New England |
| Knox Preston | 1 | Southeast |
| Alex Reiner | 1 | New England |
| Jorge Romero | 1 | Mexico |
| Edgardo Rosales | 1 | Latin America |
| Jean Mar Sanchez | 1 | Latin America |
| Brandon Sengphachanh | 1 | Mid-Atlantic |
| Matt Stone | 1 | New England |
| Carter Troncin | 1 | Midwest |
| Jack Vyletel | 1 | Great Lakes |
| Tung-Jua Yeh | 1 | Asia-Pacific |

== No-hitter ==
Grant Holman of the Eastlake Little League (Chula Vista, California) tossed a no-hitter in the fourth game of the tournament against Grosse Pointe, Michigan.

Brett Callahan Newark National Little League (Newark Delaware).

== Champion's path ==
The Musashi Fuchū LL reached the LLWS by winning all eight of their Tokyo and national tournament games. In total, they went undefeated with a 13–0 record.

| Round | Opposition | Result |
All-Tokyo Tournament
| Winner's Bracket Round 3 | Suginami LL | 15–0 |
| Winner's Bracket Quarterfinals | Koganei LL | 8–1 |
| Winner's Bracket Semifinals | Chōfi LL | 15–5 (4 inn.) |
| Winner's Bracket Final | Machida LL | 4–1 (4 inn.) |
Japan Regional
| Opening Round | (Hiroshima Prefecture) Hiroshima Saiki LL | 6–3 |
| Quarterfinals | (Osaka Prefecture) Kishiwada LL | 11–1 (5 inn.) |
| Semifinals | (Miyagi Prefecture) Sendai Aoba LL | 8–5 |
| Japan Championship | (Miyagi Prefecture) Miyagino | 11–6 |

== Notable players ==
- Brett Callahan (Mid-Atlantic) - Outfielder for the Detroit Tigers
- Robert Hassell III (Southeast) - Outfielder for the Washington Nationals
- Grant Holman (West) - Pitcher for the Oakland Athletics
- Chris McElvain (Southeast) - Pitcher in the Toronto Blue Jays organization
- Blake Money (Southeast) - Pitcher in the Baltimore Orioles organization
- Conner Smith (Southeast) - Country singer

Coaches

- Pavel Chadim (Europe-Africa Region) - Manager of Czech Republic national baseball team at the 2023 World Baseball Classic
