= 2020 Little League World Series =

Cancelled children's baseball tournament

Tournament details
- Dates: August 20–August 30 (planned)
- Teams: 16 (planned)

The 2020 Little League World Series was scheduled to take place during August 20–30, 2020, at the Little League headquarters complex in South Williamsport, Pennsylvania. It was canceled on April 30, 2020, due to the COVID-19 pandemic.

== Cancellation ==
Talks of cancellation or postponement began in early March as professional sports leagues such as the NBA, NHL, MLB, MLR, and MLS suspended their seasons. In an April 15 interview with the Associated Press, Little League president and CEO Stephen Keener spoke on the challenging decision in regards to the World Series and coronavirus. One of the most prominent resolutions to the situation would be moving the World Series back and playing later in the fall, possibly late September, October or even November. However, Keener negated that idea:

If we were to do it in the fall, pretty much every team that would be here would have to be uprooted from school. I’m not so sure that it would be in the best interest of a child’s education, after having missed probably a couple of months of school already, to take them out of school in the fall to come play in a baseball tournament. That, to me, would be quite unimportant.

— Stephen D. Keener, President and CEO of Little League International

On April 30, 2020, Little League Baseball announced the cancellation of the 2020 World Series and its regional tournaments for baseball and softball.

Little League said in a press release:

After a thorough assessment of the impact the devastating COVID-19 pandemic has had on 6,500 community-based Little League® programs in 84 countries and based upon the direction of governmental and public health authorities, and in consultation with medical professionals and our Board of Directors, Little League International has made the difficult and disappointing decision to cancel its seven World Series tournaments and their respective regional qualifying events.

— Little League press release of April 30, 2020

Little League's president and CEO said in the release:

“This is a heartbreaking decision for everyone at Little League International, but more so for those millions of Little Leaguers who have dreamt of one day playing in one of our seven World Series events. After exhausting all possible options, we came to the conclusion that because of the significant public health uncertainty that will still exist several months from now, and with direction from Pennsylvania Governor Tom Wolf and Secretary of Health Dr. Rachel Levine, as well as senior public health officials and government leaders from locations where our other six World Series are held, as well as their qualifying regional tournaments, it will not be possible to proceed with our tournaments as we’ve hosted them for nearly 75 years.”

— Stephen D. Keener, President and CEO of Little League International

== 2020 MLB Little League Classic ==
The 2020 edition of the MLB Little League Classic game at Williamsport's BB&T Ballpark at Historic Bowman Field was to feature the Boston Red Sox and the Baltimore Orioles in the first American League matchup for the event on August 23; it was also cancelled on April 30, 2020.
