= Shenandoah Junction, West Virginia =

- Census-designated place
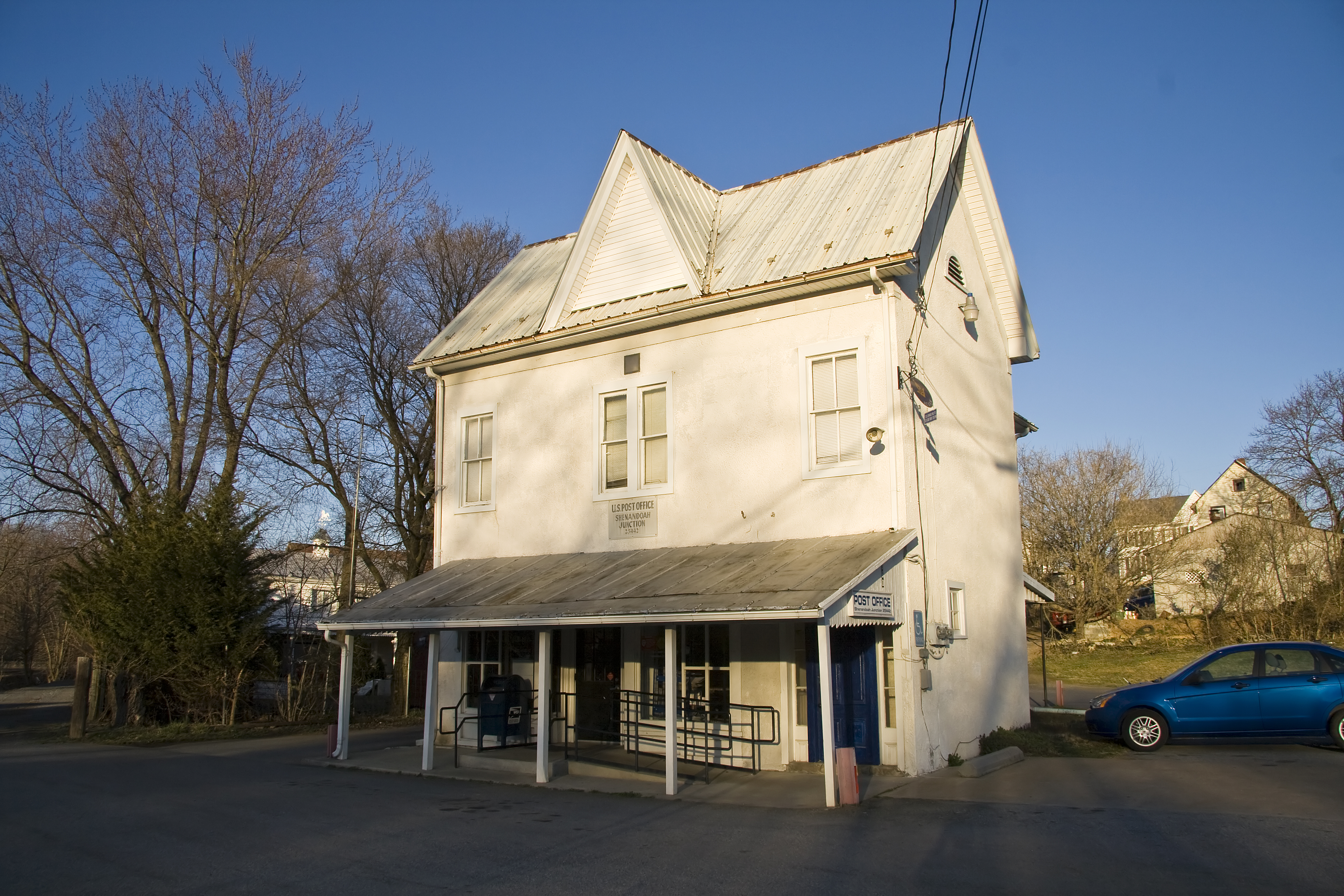
- Shenandoah Junction post office

- Location within West Virginia Location within the United States
- Coordinates: 39°21′11″N 77°50′15″W
- Country: United States
- State: West Virginia
- County: Jefferson

Area
  - Total: 1.013 sq mi (2.62 km^{2})
  - Land: 1.013 sq mi (2.62 km^{2})
  - Water: 0 sq mi (0 km^{2})
- Elevation: 541 ft (165 m)

Population (2020)
  - Total: 635
  - Density: 627/sq mi (242/km^{2})
- Time zone: UTC-5 (Eastern (EST))
  - Summer (DST): UTC-4 (EDT)
- ZIP codes: 25442
- GNIS feature ID: 2586882

Shenandoah Junction is a census-designated place (CDP) in Jefferson County in the U.S. state of West Virginia's Eastern Panhandle. As of the 2020 census, Shenandoah Junction had a population of 635 (down from 703 at the 2010 census). It is located between Kearneysville, WV and Charles Town, WV off WV 9. Shenandoah Junction is home to Jefferson High School and West Virginia's oldest surviving wood-frame structure, the Peter Burr House, built around 1751. The land where Shenandoah Junction was built was part of the 392 acres (1.59 km^{2}) granted by Lord Fairfax to Lewis Neil. The town was originally called Neil's, but the name was changed to Shenandoah Junction in 1881.

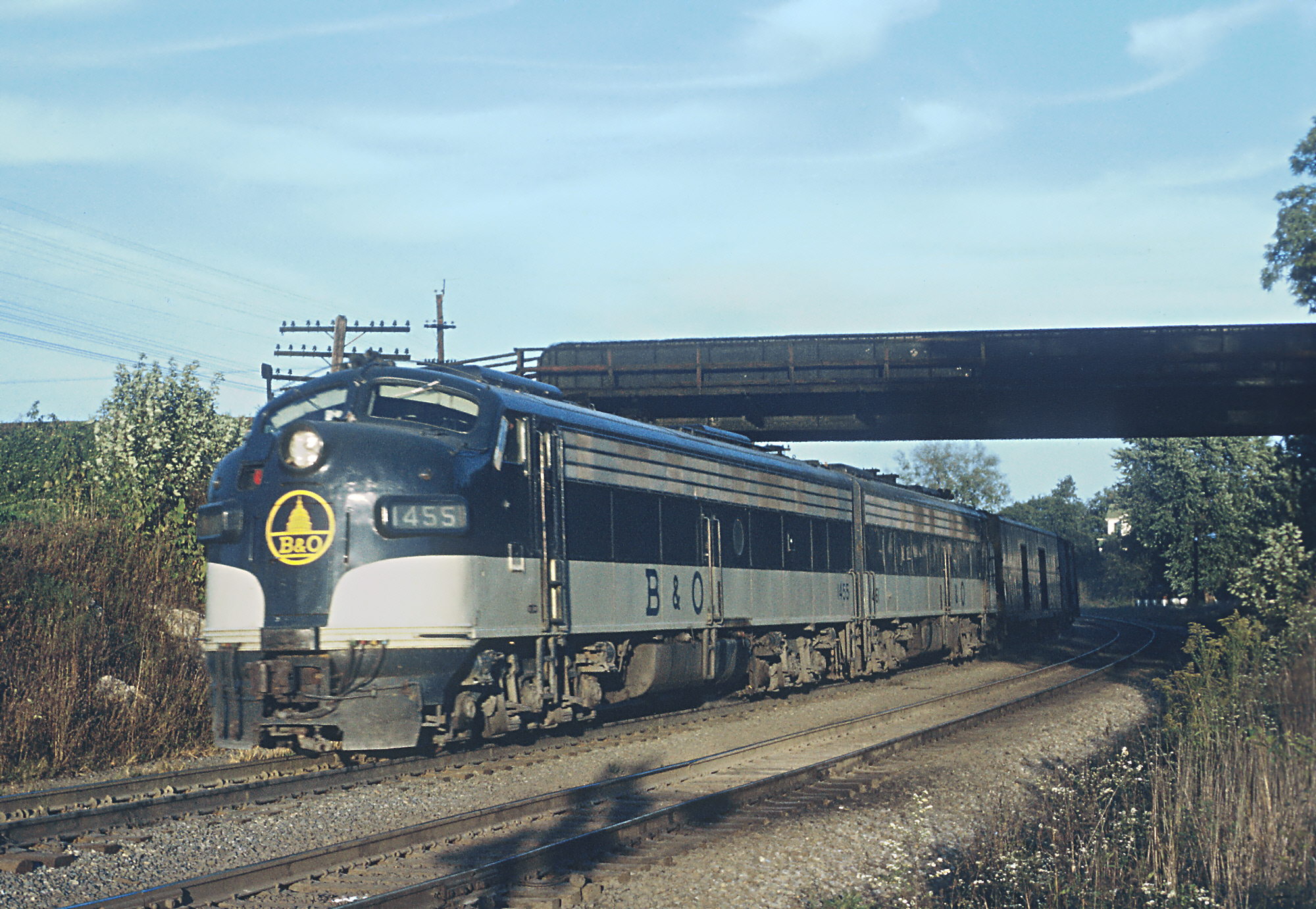
The Baltimore and Ohio Railroad Capitol Limited passes through Shenandoah Junction in 1970

The community owes much of its early growth to the coming of the Baltimore and Ohio Railroad in the 1830s, and the name refers to the junction of the B&O and Norfolk and Western Railway at the center of the community. Today, the Norfolk Southern Hagerstown District (H-Line), and the CSX Cumberland Subdivision lines intersect at the Junction.

== Antietam City ==
Owing to its good access to railroads, Shenandoah Junction was briefly proposed for major development, to be called "Antietam City." In 1890 Colonel Charles T. Hood began optioning land in the area at premium prices, assembling 1,000 acres (400 ha). Hood proposed extensive industrial development, to include a steel mill, a sheet metal plant, and a pipe factory, employing 5000 men. The community was to grow to a population of 20,000. The land options expired a year later, with no development.

== Climate ==
The climate in this area is characterized by hot, humid summers and generally mild to cool winters. According to the Köppen Climate Classification system, Shenandoah Junction has a humid subtropical climate, abbreviated "Cfa" on climate maps.
