= Grosse Pointe Woods, Michigan =

- City
- City of Grosse Pointe Woods
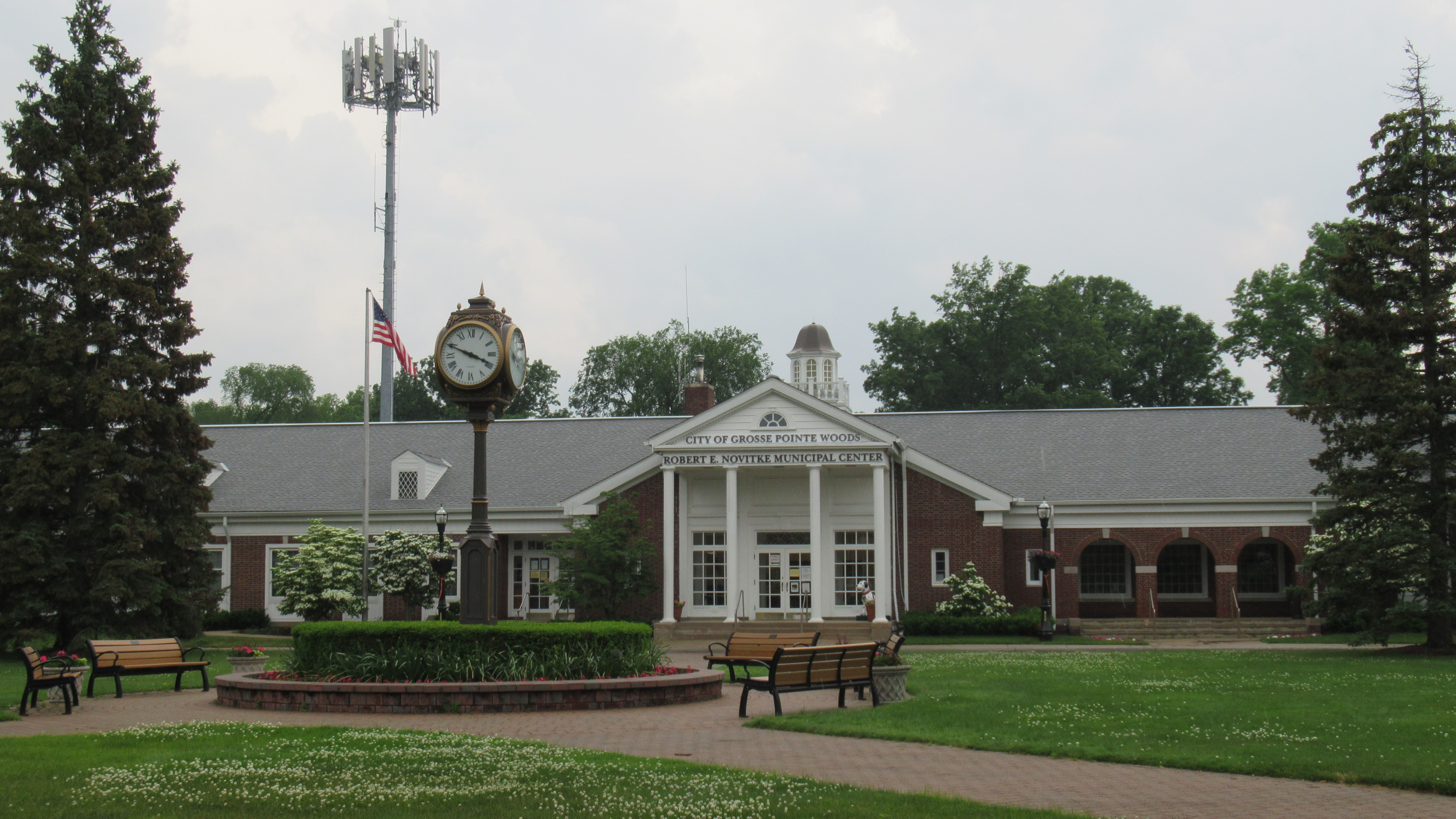
- Robert E. Novitke Municipal Center

- Seal
- Motto: Urbis Magna Pulchritudine
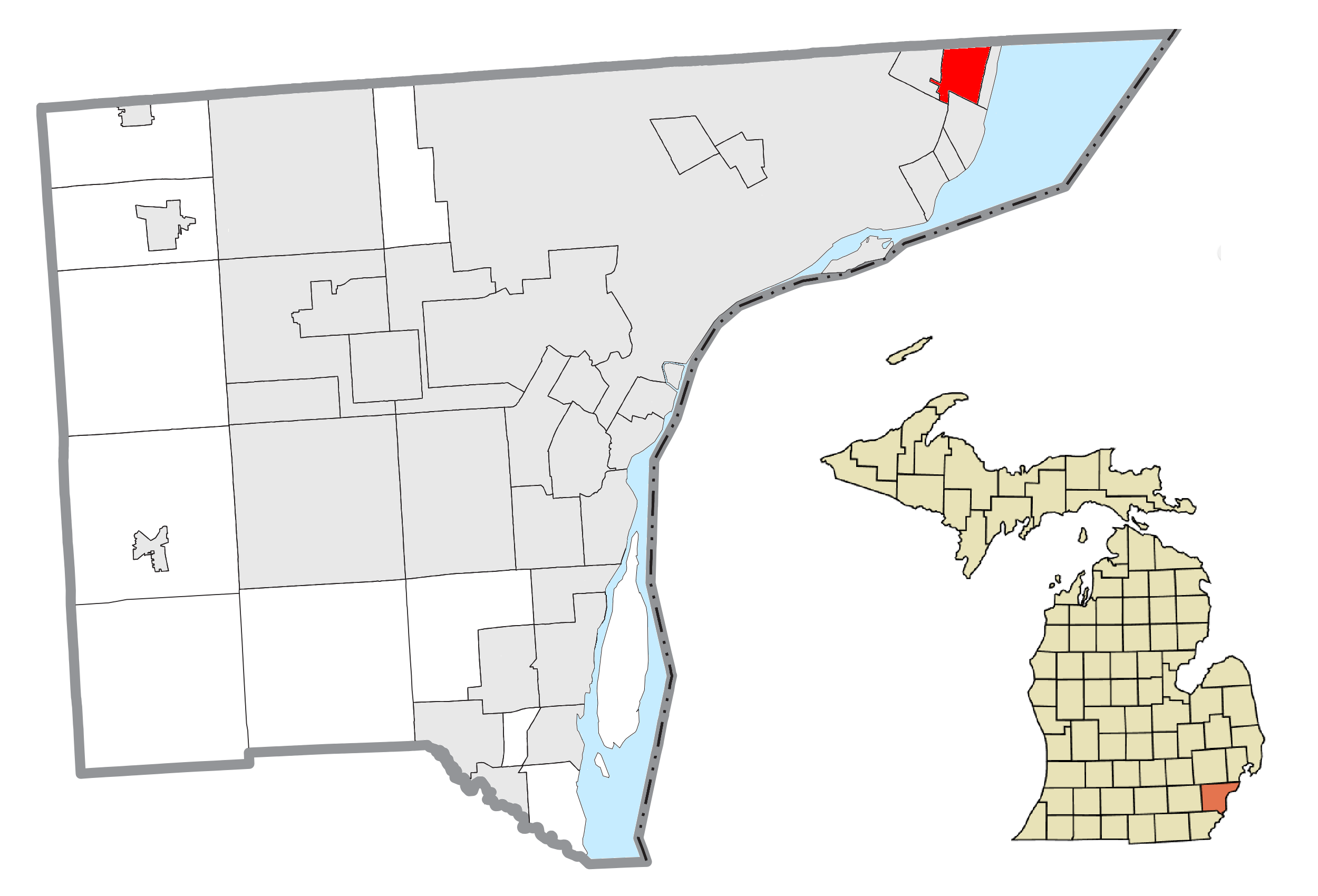
- Location within Wayne County

- Location within the state of Michigan Location within the United States
- Coordinates: 42°26′09″N 82°53′54″W
- Country: United States
- State: Michigan
- County: Wayne
- Incorporated: 1927 (village); 1950 (city)

Government
  - Type: Council–manager
  - Mayor: Arthur Bryant
  - Administrator: Susan Como
  - Clerk: Paul Antolin

Area
  - City: 3.24 sq mi (8.40 km^{2})
  - Land: 3.24 sq mi (8.39 km^{2})
  - Water: 0 sq mi (0.00 km^{2})
- Elevation: 584 ft (178 m)

Population (2020)
  - City: 16,487
  - Density: 5,087.2/sq mi (1,964.18/km^{2})
  - Metro: 4,285,832 (Metro Detroit)
- Time zone: UTC-5 (EST)
  - Summer (DST): UTC-4 (EDT)
- Zip code(s): 48236
- Area code: 313
- FIPS code: 26-35580
- GNIS feature ID: 0627468
- Website: www.gpwmi.us

Grosse Pointe Woods is a city in Wayne County in the U.S. state of Michigan. One of the five "Grosse Pointe" suburbs of Detroit, Grosse Pointe Woods is located roughly 12 miles (19.3 km) east of downtown Detroit. As of the 2020 census, Grosse Pointe Woods had a population of 16,487.

== History ==
While initially settled over a century ago, much of the city in its current form was built in the middle of the 20th century, particularly around and just after World War II, distinguishing Grosse Pointe Woods from older portions of Grosse Pointe.

The city was originally incorporated as the Village of Lochmoor in 1927 from the last unincorporated portion of Grosse Pointe Township. The village annexed the Stanhope-Allard strip of land from what was then Gratiot Township in 1931. The village changed its name from Lochmoor to Grosse Pointe Woods in 1939, but didn't incorporate as a city until 1950.

== Geography ==
According to the United States Census Bureau, the city has a total area of 3.25 square miles (8.42 km^{2}), all land. It is the only one of the five Grosse Pointes with no Lake St. Clair shoreline, although the city owns a park in neighboring St. Clair Shores that is on the lake.

== Demographics ==
=== Racial and ethnic composition ===
Grosse Pointe Woods, Michigan – Racial and ethnic composition Note: the US Census treats Hispanic/Latino as an ethnic category. This table excludes Latinos from the racial categories and assigns them to a separate category. Hispanics/Latinos may be of any race.
Race / Ethnicity (NH = Non-Hispanic)	Pop 2000	Pop 2010	Pop 2020	% 2000	% 2010	% 2020
White alone (NH)	16,310	14,525	13,764	95.49%	90.02%	83.48%
Black or African American alone (NH)	106	725	1232	0.62%	4.49%	8.08%
Native American or Alaska Native alone (NH)	10	14	12	0.06%	0.09%	0.07%
Asian alone (NH)	353	389	355	2.07%	2.41%	2.15%
Native Hawaiian or Pacific Islander alone (NH)	0	0	5	0.00%	0.00%	0.03%
Other race alone (NH)	7	13	59	0.04%	0.08%	0.36%
Mixed race or Multiracial (NH)	127	199	570	0.74%	1.23%	3.46%
Hispanic or Latino (any race)	167	270	490	0.98%	1.67%	2.97%
Total	17,080	16,135	16,487	100.00%	100.00%	100.00%

Historical population
Census	Pop.	Note	%±
1930	961		—
1940	2,805		191.9%
1950	10,381		270.1%
1960	18,580		79.0%
1970	21,878		17.8%
1980	18,886		−13.7%
1990	17,715		−6.2%
2000	17,080		−3.6%
2010	16,135		−5.5%
2020	16,487		2.2%
U.S. Decennial Census

=== 2020 census ===
As of the 2020 census, Grosse Pointe Woods had a population of 16,487. The median age was 44.7 years. 20.5% of residents were under the age of 18 and 22.4% were 65 years of age or older. For every 100 females, there were 92.0 males, and for every 100 females age 18 and over, there were 88.4 males age 18 and over.

100.0% of residents lived in urban areas, while 0.0% lived in rural areas.

There were 6,594 households, of which 29.2% had children under the age of 18 living in them. Of all households, 58.6% were married-couple households, 12.9% were households with a male householder and no spouse or partner present, and 24.8% were households with a female householder and no spouse or partner present. About 25.6% of all households were made up of individuals, and 14.7% had someone living alone who was 65 years of age or older.

There were 6,874 housing units, of which 4.1% were vacant. The homeowner vacancy rate was 1.2%, and the rental vacancy rate was 7.4%.

=== 2010 census ===
As of the census of 2010, there were 16,135 people, 6,416 households, and 4,681 families living in the city. The population density was 4,964.6 inhabitants per square mile (1,916.8/km^{2}). There were 6,819 housing units at an average density of 2,098.2 per square mile (810.1/km^{2}). The racial makeup of the city was 91.4% White, 4.5% African American, 0.1% Native American, 2.4% Asian, 0.3% from other races, and 1.3% from two or more races. Hispanic or Latino of any race were 1.7% of the population.

There were 6,416 households, of which 31.9% had children under the age of 18 living with them, 60.0% were married couples living together, 10.0% had a female householder with no husband present, 3.0% had a male householder with no wife present, and 27.0% were non-families. 24.4% of all households were made up of individuals, and 12.7% had someone living alone who was 65 years of age or older. The average household size was 2.51 and the average family size was 3.01.

The median age in the city was 45.1 years. 23.7% of residents were under the age of 18; 6.2% were between the ages of 18 and 24; 20% were from 25 to 44; 32.4% were from 45 to 64; and 17.7% were 65 years of age or older. The gender makeup of the city was 47.9% male and 52.1% female.

=== 2000 census ===
As of the census of 2000, there were 17,080 people, 6,531 households, and 4,970 families living in the city. The population density was 5,237.3 inhabitants per square mile (2,022.1/km^{2}). There were 6,717 housing units at an average density of 2,059.6 per square mile (795.2/km^{2}). The racial makeup of the city was 96.30% White, 0.63% African American, 0.06% Native American, 2.08% Asian, 0.11% from other races, and 0.81% from two or more races. Hispanic or Latino of any race were 0.98% of the population.

There were 6,531 households, out of which 35.1% had children under the age of 18 living with them, 65.4% were married couples living together, 8.5% had a female householder with no husband present, and 23.9% were non-families. 22.0% of all households were made up of individuals, and 10.8% had someone living alone who was 65 years of age or older. The average household size was 2.60 and the average family size was 3.07.

In the city, the population was spread out, with 26.1% under the age of 18, 5.0% from 18 to 24, 25.2% from 25 to 44, 25.6% from 45 to 64, and 18.2% who were 65 years of age or older. The median age was 42 years. For every 100 females, there were 92.7 males. For every 100 females age 18 and over, there were 87.7 males.

The median income for a household in the city was $78,558, and the median income for a family was $89,086. Males had a median income of $70,488 versus $43,665 for females. The per capita income for the city was $38,653. About 1.7% of families and 2.4% of the population were below the poverty line, including 2.3% of those under age 18 and 2.8% of those age 65 or over.

== Notable people ==
- Nolan Allaer, racing driver
- J. K. Simmons, actor
- Corey Tropp, NHL ice hockey player
- Zachary Werenski, NHL ice hockey player
- Antonio Cipriano, actor/singer
