= List of Little League World Series championship games =

Coordinates: 41.23°N 76.98°W

Since the inception of the Little League World Series in 1947, 78 Little League World Series championship games have been played. The United States leads the number of championship games won with 40, followed by Taiwan with 18, Japan with 11, Mexico and South Korea with 3 each, and Curaçao and Venezuela with 2 each.

== Little League World Series championship games ==
| Year | Winner | Score | Runner-up |
|---|---|---|---|
| 1947 | Williamsport, Pennsylvania | 16–7 | Lock Haven, Pennsylvania |
| 1948 | Lock Haven, Pennsylvania | 6–5 | St. Petersburg, Florida |
| 1949 | Hammonton, New Jersey | 5–0 | Pensacola, Florida |
| 1950 | Houston, Texas | 2–1 | Bridgeport, Connecticut |
| 1951 | Stamford, Connecticut | 3–0 | Austin, Texas |
| 1952 | Norwalk, Connecticut | 4–3 | Monongahela, Pennsylvania |
| 1953 | Birmingham, Alabama | 1–0 | (New York (state)); Schenectady, New York |
| 1954 | (New York (state)); Schenectady, New York | 7–5 | Colton, California |
| 1955 | Morrisville, Pennsylvania | 4–3 | Delaware Township, New Jersey |
| 1956 | Roswell, New Mexico | 3–1 | Delaware Township, New Jersey |
| 1957 | Monterrey, Nuevo León, Mexico | 4–0 | La Mesa, California |
| 1958 | Monterrey, Nuevo León, Mexico | 10–1 | Kankakee, Illinois |
| 1959 | Hamtramck, Michigan | 12–0 | Auburn, California |
| 1960 | Levittown, Pennsylvania | 5–0 | Fort Worth, Texas |
| 1961 | El Cajon, California | 4–2 | El Campo, Texas |
| 1962 | San Jose, California | 3–0 | Kankakee, Illinois |
| 1963 | Granada Hills, California | 2–1 | Stratford, Connecticut |
| 1964 | (New York (state)); Staten Island, New York | 4–0 | Monterrey, Nuevo León, Mexico |
| 1965 | Windsor Locks, Connecticut | 3–1 | Stoney Creek, Ontario, Canada |
| 1966 | Houston, Texas | 8–2 | West New York, New Jersey |
| 1967 | West Tokyo, Japan | 4–1 | Chicago, Illinois |
| 1968 | Wakayama, Osaka, Japan | 1–0 | Richmond, Virginia |
| 1969 | Taichung, Taiwan | 5–0 | Santa Clara, California |
| 1970 | Wayne, New Jersey | 2–0 | Campbell, California |
| 1971 | Tainan, Taiwan | 12–3 (F/9) | Gary, Indiana |
| 1972 | Taipei, Taiwan | 6–0 | Hammond, Indiana |
| 1973 | Tainan, Taiwan | 12–0 | Tucson, Arizona |
| 1974 | Kaohsiung, Taiwan | 12–1 | Red Bluff, California |
| 1975^{*} | Lakewood, New Jersey | 4–3 | Tampa, Florida |
| 1976 | Chōfu, Tokyo, Japan | 10–3 | Campbell, California |
| 1977 | Kaohsiung, Taiwan | 7–2 | El Cajon, California |
| 1978 | Pingtung, Taiwan | 11–1 | Danville, California |
| 1979 | Taipei, Taiwan | 2–1 (F/8) | Campbell, California |
| 1980 | Hualien, Taiwan | 4–3 | Tampa, Florida |
| 1981 | Taichung, Taiwan | 4–2 | Tampa, Florida |
| 1982 | (Washington (state)); Kirkland, Washington | 6–0 | Chiayi, Taiwan |
| 1983 | (Georgia (U.S. state)); Marietta, Georgia | 3–1 | Barahona, Dominican Republic |
| 1984 | Seoul, South Korea | 6–2 | Altamonte Springs, Florida |
| 1985 | Seoul, South Korea | 7–1 | (Mexico) / (California); Mexicali, BC/Calexico, CA |
| 1986 | Tainan, Taiwan | 12–0 | Tucson, Arizona |
| 1987 | Hualien, Taiwan | 21–1 | Irvine, California |
| 1988 | Taichung, Taiwan | 10–0 | Pearl City, Hawaii |
| 1989 | Trumbull, Connecticut | 5–2 | Kaohsiung, Taiwan |
| 1990 | Tainan, Taiwan | 9–0 | Shippensburg, Pennsylvania |
| 1991 | Taichung, Taiwan | 11–0 | Danville, California |
| 1992 | ‡Long Beach, California | 6–0 (fft) | ‡Santo Domingo, Dominican Republic |
| 1993 | Long Beach, California | 3–2 | David, Chiriquí, Panama |
| 1994 | Maracaibo, Venezuela | 4–3 | Northridge, California |
| 1995 | Tainan, Taiwan | 17–3 (F/5) | Spring, Texas |
| 1996 | Kaohsiung, Taiwan | 13–3 (F/5) | Cranston, Rhode Island |
| 1997 | Guadalupe, Nuevo León, Mexico | 5–4 | South Mission Viejo, California |
| 1998 | Toms River, New Jersey | 12–9 | Kashima, Japan |
| 1999 | Hirakata, Osaka, Japan | 5–0 | Phenix City, Alabama |
| 2000 | Maracaibo, Venezuela | 3–2 | Bellaire, Texas |
| 2001 | Tokyo Kitasuna, Tokyo, Japan | 2–1 | Apopka, Florida |
| 2002 | Louisville, Kentucky | 1–0 | Sendai, Miyagi, Japan |
| 2003 | Musashi-Fuchū, Tokyo, Japan | 10–1 | East Boynton Beach, Florida |
| 2004 | Willemstad, Curaçao | 5–2 | Thousand Oaks, California |
| 2005 | ʻEwa Beach, Hawaii | 7–6 (F/7) | Willemstad, Curaçao |
| 2006 | (Georgia (U.S. state)); Columbus, Georgia | 2–1 | Kawaguchi City, Japan |
| 2007 | (Georgia (U.S. state)); Warner Robins, Georgia | 3–2 (F/8) | Tokyo, Japan |
| 2008 | Waipahu, Hawaii | 12–3 | Matamoros, Tamaulipas, Mexico |
| 2009 | Chula Vista, California | 6–3 | Taoyuan County, Taiwan |
| 2010 | Edogawa Minami, Tokyo, Japan | 4–1 | Waipahu, Hawaii |
| 2011 | Huntington Beach, California | 2–1 | Hamamatsu City, Japan |
| 2012 | Tokyo-Kitasuna, Tokyo, Japan | 12–2 (F/5) | Goodlettsville, Tennessee |
| 2013 | Musashi-Fuchū, Tokyo, Japan | 6–4 | Chula Vista, California |
| 2014 | Seoul, South Korea | 6–0 (fft.) | ‡Las Vegas, Nevada |
| 2015 | Tokyo-Kitasuna, Tokyo, Japan | 18–11 | Lewisberry, Pennsylvania |
| 2016 | (New York (state)); Maine-Endwell, New York | 2–1 | Seoul, South Korea |
| 2017 | Tokyo-Kitasuna, Tokyo, Japan | 12–2 (F/5) | Lufkin, Texas |
| 2018 | Honolulu, Hawaii | 3–0 | Seoul, South Korea |
| 2019 | River Ridge, Louisiana | 8–0 | Willemstad, Curaçao |
| 2020 | Cancelled due to COVID-19 pandemic | | |
| 2021 | Taylor, Michigan | 5–2 | Hamilton, Ohio |
| 2022 | Honolulu, Hawaii | 13–3 (F/4) | Willemstad, Curaçao |
| 2023 | El Segundo, California | 6–5 | Willemstad, Curaçao |
| 2024 | Lake Mary, Florida | 2–1 (F/8) | Taoyuan, Taiwan |
| 2025 | Taipei, Taiwan | 7–0 | Las Vegas, Nevada |
| 2026 | Willemstad, Curaçao | 11–2 | Henderson, Nevada |

^{‡} Forfeits due to ineligible players:

1. 1992: Zamboanga City, Philippines, was disqualified and stripped of its 1992 world championship for overage players. Zamboanga City won 15–4 over Long Beach.
2. Chicago was disqualified and stripped of the U.S. championship in 2014 for geographical restrictions; the U.S. championship was reallocated to Las Vegas, Nevada, which lost the U.S. championship match to Chicago. Seoul, South Korea originally won 8–4 over Chicago.

== Championship tally ==
=== Championships won by country/state ===
| Rank | Team | Titles | Years |
|---|---|---|---|
| – | United States | 40 | 1947, 1948, 1949, 1950, 1951, 1952, 1953, 1954, 1955, 1956, 1959, 1960, 1961, 1962, 1963, 1964, 1965, 1966, 1970, 1975, 1982, 1983, 1989, 1992, 1993, 1998, 2002, 2005, 2006, 2007, 2008, 2009, 2011, 2016, 2018, 2019, 2021, 2022, 2023, 2024 |
| 1 | Taiwan | 18 | 1969, 1971, 1972, 1973, 1974, 1977, 1978, 1979, 1980, 1981, 1986, 1987, 1988, 1990, 1991, 1995, 1996, 2025 |
| 2 | Japan | 11 | 1967, 1968, 1976, 1999, 2001, 2003, 2010, 2012, 2013, 2015, 2017 |
| 3 | California | 8 | 1961, 1962, 1963, 1992‡, 1993, 2009, 2011, 2023 |
| 4 | Pennsylvania | 4 | 1947, 1948, 1955, 1960 |
| 4 | Connecticut | 4 | 1951, 1952, 1965, 1989 |
| 4 | New Jersey | 4 | 1949, 1970, 1975, 1998 |
| 4 | Hawaii | 4 | 2005, 2008, 2018, 2022 |
| 8 | Mexico | 3 | 1957, 1958, 1997 |
| 8 | (Georgia (U.S. state)) Georgia | 3 | 1983, 2006, 2007 |
| 8 | South Korea | 3 | 1984, 1985, 2014 |
| 8 | New York | 3 | 1954, 1964, 2016 |
| 12 | Texas | 2 | 1950, 1966 |
| 12 | Venezuela | 2 | 1994, 2000 |
| 12 | Michigan | 2 | 1959, 2021 |
| 12 | Curaçao | 2 | 2004, 2026 |
| 16 | Alabama | 1 | 1953 |
| 16 | New Mexico | 1 | 1956 |
| 16 | (Washington (state)) Washington | 1 | 1982 |
| 16 | Kentucky | 1 | 2002 |
| 16 | Louisiana | 1 | 2019 |
| 16 | Florida | 1 | 2024 |

=== Championship notes ===
- In November 1974, "whispers about overage Asian participants grew to shouts" when over a three-year stretch Taiwan outscored U.S. teams, 120–2, in a span of nine Little League World Series games. Then LLWS chairman Peter McGovern reluctantly agreed to a blanket ban of all international teams. After an uproar of criticism and an investigation that could produce no evidence of rules violations, the ban was rescinded for the 1976 event.
- In 1976, the tournament was split into two brackets; one for International teams, and one for teams representing the United States. As a result, a team representing the United States is assured of being in the finals each year.
- In 1985, Mexicali, Mexico, represented the West Region of the United States in the Little League World Series. Because of its proximity to the El Centro/Calexico area in Southern California, Mexicali competed in and represented California's District 22 in the Southern California division from 1957 to 1985, representing the bordering city of Calexico, California.
- In 1992, Long Beach was declared a 6–0 winner after the international tournament committee determined that Zamboanga City had used ineligible players that were either not from within its city limits, over age, or both. The championship game was originally won by Zamboanga City, 15–4.
- From 1997 to 2002, no teams from Taiwan participated in the tournament. In 1997, the Taiwan Baseball Association decided its leagues would no longer charter with Little League. From the introduction of Far East teams in 1967 until after 1996, Taiwan had won 17 of a possible 30 championships and had been runner-up twice.

Due to complicated relations with the People's Republic of China, the Republic of China—commonly known as Taiwan—is recognized by the name Chinese Taipei by a majority of international organizations, including Little League Baseball. LLWS records and news accounts may use Republic of China, Taiwan, or Chinese Taipei to refer to the same entity.

- In 2001, Danny Almonte, a pitcher from the Bronx, New York, team representing the Mid-Atlantic Region, was discovered to not be eligible because he was two years over the maximum age limit. Because of this, the Mid-Atlantic team was retroactively assessed a forfeit for each game they won in the tournament. The team's statistics, including a perfect game thrown by Almonte, were scrubbed from the record.
- In 2009, a team from Taiwan reached the championship match for the first time since 1996, but lost to a team from Chula Vista, California.
- In 2014, Chicago defeated Las Vegas for the U.S. championship before losing to Seoul, South Korea, in the LLWS championship. On February 11, 2015, Chicago was stripped of its U.S. title for fielding ineligible players; it was retroactively awarded to Las Vegas.
- In 2019, River Ridge became the first team since the expansion to 16 teams in 2001, and the second team in tournament history, to win the LLWS after losing their first game of tournament play (the first such team was Maracaibo, Venezuela, winners of the 2000 tournament).
