= List of Little League World Series appearances by U.S. state =

This is the list of U.S. states that have participated in the Little League World Series since its inception in 1947. As of 2026, 44 states have qualified and participated in at least one world series. The United States holds a total of 40 Little League titles won by 15 different states. Among the states, California holds the record for most appearances (51), most titles (8) and most U.S. titles (15), while Florida has appeared in a total of 24 world series', 9 championship games and won their first title in 2024. For international teams participation, see List of Little League World Series appearances by country.

== State Participants ==
As of the 2026 Little League World Series.

| State | First LLWS | Last Appearance | Appearances | Championships | Runners-up | Third place Finishes | Record in LLWS | PCT |
|---|---|---|---|---|---|---|---|---|
| Alabama | 1953 | 2026 | 9 | 1 (1953) | 1 | 3 | 15–10 | .600 |
| Arizona | 1965 | 2007 | 6 | 0 | 2 | 0 | 12–8 | .600 |
| Arkansas | 1952 | 1979 | 3 | 0 | 0 | 1 | 2–3 | .400 |
| California | 1951 | 2026 | 51 | 8 (1961, 1962, 1963, 1992, 1993, 2009, 2011, 2023) | 16 | 6 | 116–66 | .637 |
| Connecticut | 1948 | 2025 | 22 | 4 (1951, 1952, 1965, 1989) | 2 | 3 | 40–30 | .571 |
| Delaware | 2003 | 2013 | 2 | 0 | 0 | 0 | 2–4 | .333 |
| Florida | 1948 | 2024 | 24 | 1 (2024) | 8 | 5 | 43–31 | .581 |
| (Georgia (U.S. state)) Georgia | 1983 | 2018 | 7 | 3 (1983, 2006, 2007) | 0 | 0 | 24–10 | .706 |
| Hawaii | 1958 | 2025 | 17 | 4 (2005, 2008, 2018, 2022) | 2 | 3 | 49–19 | .721 |
| Idaho | 1999 | 2018 | 2 | 0 | 0 | 0 | 2–4 | .333 |
| Illinois | 1950 | 2025 | 16 | 0 | 3 | 2 | 21–23 | .477 |
| Indiana | 1949 | 2022 | 17 | 0 | 2 | 2 | 18–26 | .409 |
| Iowa | 1975 | 2026 | 16 | 0 | 0 | 2 | 16–35 | .314 |
| Kentucky | 1971 | 2019 | 10 | 1 (2002) | 0 | 1 | 15–20 | .429 |
| Louisiana | 1955 | 2021 | 9 | 1 (2019) | 0 | 0 | 16–17 | .485 |
| Maine | 1951 | 2023 | 4 | 0 | 0 | 0 | 2–7 | .222 |
| Maryland | 1950 | 2008 | 7 | 0 | 0 | 0 | 6–15 | .286 |
| Massachusetts | 1953 | 2026 | 13 | 0 | 0 | 1 | 15–24 | .385 |
| Michigan | 1955 | 2021 | 13 | 2 (1959, 2021) | 0 | 1 | 14–23 | .378 |
| Minnesota | 1963 | 2019 | 7 | 0 | 0 | 1 | 7–14 | .333 |
| Mississippi | 1977 | 1977 | 1 | 0 | 0 | 0 | 2–1 | .667 |
| Missouri | 2002 | 2015 | 3 | 0 | 0 | 0 | 2–7 | .222 |
| Montana | 2011 | 2011 | 1 | 0 | 0 | 1 | 3–1 | .750 |
| Nebraska | 2012 | 2021 | 2 | 0 | 0 | 0 | 3–4 | .429 |
| Nevada | 2014 | 2026 | 5 | 0 | 3 | 0 | 16–8 | .667 |
| New Hampshire | 1987 | 2024 | 6 | 0 | 0 | 1 | 6–13 | .316 |
| New Jersey | 1947 | 2026 | 21 | 4 (1949, 1970, 1975, 1998) | 3 | 4 | 39–24 | .619 |
| New Mexico | 1956 | 1956 | 1 | 1 (1956) | 0 | 0 | 3–0 | 1.000 |
| (New York (state)) New York | 1948 | 2024 | 22 | 3 (1954, 1964, 2016) | 1 | 3 | 32–29 | .525 |
| North Carolina | 1952 | 2017 | 5 | 0 | 0 | 1 | 7–10 | .412 |
| North Dakota | 2023 | 2023 | 1 | 0 | 0 | 0 | 0–2 | .000 |
| Ohio | 1949 | 2026 | 13 | 0 | 1 | 1 | 19–25 | .432 |
| Oklahoma | 1964 | 1988 | 2 | 0 | 0 | 0 | 2–4 | .333 |
| Oregon | 1958 | 2021 | 8 | 0 | 0 | 1 | 8–17 | .320 |
| Pennsylvania | 1947 | 2026 | 26 | 4 (1947, 1948, 1955, 1960) | 4 | 2 | 35–34 | .507 |
| Rhode Island | 1950 | 2023 | 12 | 0 | 1 | 0 | 12–25 | .324 |
| South Carolina | 1949 | 2025 | 4 | 0 | 0 | 0 | 4–6 | .400 |
| South Dakota | 2008 | 2025 | 7 | 0 | 0 | 0 | 6–17 | .261 |
| Tennessee | 1970 | 2023 | 11 | 0 | 1 | 1 | 22–21 | .512 |
| Texas | 1950 | 2026 | 31 | 2 (1950, 1966) | 6 | 5 | 72–50 | .590 |
| Utah | 2022 | 2022 | 1 | 0 | 0 | 0 | 0–2 | .000 |
| Virginia | 1948 | 2019 | 9 | 0 | 1 | 3 | 10–13 | .435 |
| (Washington (state)) Washington | 1980 | 2026 | 18 | 1 (1982) | 0 | 1 | 25–34 | .424 |
| West Virginia | 1951 | 1951 | 1 | 0 | 0 | 1 | 2–1 | .667 |
| Total | | | 466 | 40 | 57 | 56 | 765–738 | .509 |

== U.S. Finals ==
Since 1976, a U.S. final is played. The winner plays versus the International Champion for the LLWS championship. In 2021, no international teams participated in the tournament which meant there was no official U.S. final. The 2021 LLWS championship game is also considered the U.S. championship game.

As of the 2026 Little League World Series.

| LLWS | Winner | Score | Runner-up | LLWS Result |
|---|---|---|---|---|
| 1976 | Campbell, California | 3–0 | Richmond, Virginia | Runner-Up |
| 1977 | El Cajon, California | 6–5 | (New York (state)) Rotterdam, New York | Runner-Up |
| 1978 | Danville, California | 6–5 | Lexington, Kentucky | Runner-Up |
| 1979 | Campbell, California | 8–3 | North Little Rock, Arkansas | Runner-Up |
| 1980 | Tampa, Florida | 16–0 | (Washington (state)) Kirkland, Washington | Runner-Up |
| 1981 | Tampa, Florida | 11–10 | Barrington, Illinois | Runner-Up |
| 1982 | (Washington (state)) Kirkland, Washington | 3–2 | Wyoming, Michigan | Champion |
| 1983 | Marietta, Georgia | 9–8 | Stamford, Connecticut | Champion |
| 1984 | Altamonte, Florida | 8–1 | Southport, Indiana | Runner-Up |
| 1985 | (Mexico) Mexicali, Baja California | 2–1 | Morristown, Tennessee | Runner-Up |
| 1986 | Tucson, Arizona | 4–1 | Sarasota, Florida | Runner-Up |
| 1987 | Irvine, California | 8–1 | Chesterfield, Indiana | Runner-Up |
| 1988 | Pearl City, Hawaii | 5–4 | Spring, Texas | Runner-Up |
| 1989 | Trumbull, Connecticut | 6–3 | San Pedro, California | Champion |
| 1990 | Shippensburg, Pennsylvania | 5–4 | Cypress, California | Runner-Up |
| 1991 | Danville, California | 13–4 | (New York (state)) Staten Island, New York | Runner-Up |
| 1992 | Long Beach, California | 1–0 | Hamilton Square, New Jersey | Champion |
| 1993 | Long Beach, California | 5–0 | Bedford, New Hampshire | Champion |
| 1994 | Northridge, California | 3–0 | Springfield, Virginia | Runner-Up |
| 1995 | Spring, Texas | 3–1 | Yorba Linda, California | Runner-Up |
| 1996 | Cranston, Rhode Island | 6–3 | Panama City, Florida | Runner-Up |
| 1997 | Mission Viejo, California | 12–1 | Bradenton, Florida | Runner-Up |
| 1998 | Toms River, New Jersey | 5–2 | Greenville, North Carolina | Champion |
| 1999 | Phenix City, Alabama | 3–2 | Toms River, New Jersey | Runner-Up |
| 2000 | Bellaire, Texas | 8–0 | Davenport, Iowa | Runner-Up |
| 2001 | Apopka, Florida | 6–0* | (New York (state)) Bronx, New York | Runner-Up |
| 2002 | Louisville, Kentucky | 4–0 | Worcester, Massachusetts | Champion |
| 2003 | Boynton Beach, Florida | 9–2 | Saugus, Massachusetts | Runner-Up |
| 2004 | Thousand Oaks, California | 4–0 | Richmond, Texas | Runner-Up |
| 2005 | Ewa Beach, Hawaii | 6–1 | Vista, California | Champion |
| 2006 | (Georgia (U.S. state)) Columbus, Georgia | 7–3 | Beaverton, Oregon | Champion |
| 2007 | (Georgia (U.S. state)) Warner Robins, Georgia | 5–2 | Lubbock, Texas | Champion |
| 2008 | Waipio, Hawaii | 7–5 | Lake Charles, Louisiana | Champion |
| 2009 | Chula Vista, California | 12–2 (F/4) | San Antonio, Texas | Champion |
| 2010 | Waipio, Hawaii | 10–0 (F/5) | Pearland, Texas | Runner-Up |
| 2011 | Huntington Beach, California | 11–2 | Billings, Montana | Champion |
| 2012 | Goodlettsville, Tennessee | 24–16 (F/7) | Petaluma, California | Runner-Up |
| 2013 | Chula Vista, California | 12–1 | Westport, Connecticut | Runner-Up |
| 2014 | Las Vegas, Nevada | 6–0* | Chicago, Illinois | Runner-Up |
| 2015 | Lewisberry, Pennsylvania | 3–2 | Pearland, Texas | Runner-Up |
| 2016 | (New York (state)) Maine-Endwell, New York | 4–2 | Goodlettsville, Tennessee | Champion |
| 2017 | Lufkin, Texas | 6–5 | Greenville, North Carolina | Runner-Up |
| 2018 | Honolulu, Hawaii | 3–0 | (Georgia (U.S. state)) Peachtree City, Georgia | Champion |
| 2019 | River Ridge, Louisiana | 9–5 | Wailuku, Hawaii | Champion |
| 2020 | Cancelled due to COVID-19 pandemic | | | |
| 2021 (Note: Since there are no international teams participating in the 2021 Little League World Series, there is no official U.S. Championship Game. Therefore, the 2021 LLWS championship game is also considered to be the United States championship as it is the last game where two U.S. teams face off.) | Taylor, Michigan | 5–2 | Hamilton, Ohio | Champion |
| 2022 | Honolulu, Hawaii | 5–1 | Nolensville, Tennessee | Champion |
| 2023 | El Segundo, California | 6–1 | Needville, Texas | Champion |
| 2024 | Lake Mary, Florida | 10–7 | Boerne, Texas | Champion |
| 2025 | Las Vegas, Nevada | 8–2 | Fairfield, Connecticut | Runner-Up |
| 2026 | Henderson, Nevada | 12–2 (F/5) | Hamilton, Ohio | Runner-Up |

| State | U.S. Championships | U.S. Runner Up | LLWS Championships |
|---|---|---|---|
| Alabama | 1 | 0 | 0 |
| Arizona | 1 | 0 | 0 |
| Arkansas | 0 | 1 | 0 |
| California | 15 | 5 | 5 |
| Connecticut | 1 | 3 | 1 |
| Florida | 6 | 3 | 1 |
| (Georgia (U.S. state)) Georgia | 3 | 1 | 3 |
| Hawaii | 6 | 1 | 4 |
| Illinois | 0 | 2 | 0 |
| Indiana | 0 | 2 | 0 |
| Iowa | 0 | 1 | 0 |
| Kentucky | 1 | 1 | 1 |
| Louisiana | 1 | 1 | 1 |
| Massachusetts | 0 | 2 | 0 |
| Michigan | 1 | 1 | 1 |
| Montana | 0 | 1 | 0 |
| Nevada | 3 | 0 | 0 |
| New Hampshire | 0 | 1 | 0 |
| New Jersey | 1 | 2 | 1 |
| New York | 1 | 3 | 1 |
| North Carolina | 0 | 2 | 0 |
| Ohio | 0 | 2 | 0 |
| Oregon | 0 | 1 | 0 |
| Pennsylvania | 2 | 0 | 0 |
| Rhode Island | 1 | 0 | 0 |
| Tennessee | 1 | 3 | 0 |
| Texas | 3 | 8 | 0 |
| Virginia | 0 | 2 | 0 |
| Washington | 1 | 1 | 1 |
| Total | 49 (Note: Total does not match runner-ups because one championship (1985) was won by a team from Mexico.) | 50 | 20 |

== Regional Appearances ==
As of the 2026 Little League World Series, six states, and the federal district of Washington D.C., have only ever appeared in regional tournaments and have never advanced to the LLWS. In 2023, North Dakota became the most recent state to qualify for their first world series after a tournament expansion took place.

| State | Region |
|---|---|
| Alaska | Northwest |
| Colorado | Mountain |
| Kansas | Midwest |
| Vermont | New England |
| (Washington, D.C.) Washington D.C. | Mid-Atlantic |
| Wisconsin | Midwest |
| Wyoming | Mountain |

== Notes ==
- The Rolando Paulino LL of The Bronx was forced to forfeit all its wins in the 2001 Little League World Series due to the Danny Almonte controversy.
- Jackie Robinson West LL fielded ineligible players resulting in all their wins being forfeited including the U.S. Championship in the 2014 Little League World Series. Mountain Ridge LL of Las Vegas, Nevada is the official U.S. Champion and World Series Runner-Up. The game is recorded as a 6–0 loss (Non-forfeited score, 7–5 Illinois).
- Virginia shares 1976 3rd place with Puerto Rico. The game was canceled due to weather.
- Indiana shares 1986 3rd place with Dominican Republic. The game was canceled due to weather.
- Oregon shares 2006 3rd place with Mexico. The game was canceled due to weather.
- Montana shares 2011 3rd place with Mexico. The game was canceled due to Hurricane Irene.
- The 2020 Little League World Series was cancelled due to the COVID-19 pandemic
- The 2021 Little League World Series only featured United States teams for the first time since 1975. Two teams from each of the 8 U.S. regions participated in the World Series (regional champion and runner-up)
- The 2022 Little League World Series included the return of international teams and a tournament expansion which added four regions (Metro, Mountain, Panama, Puerto Rico)

== See also ==
- List of Little League World Series appearances by region
- List of Little League World Series appearances by country
