= List of Little League World Series appearances by country =

This is the list of countries, other than United States, that have participated in the Little League World Series since Canada being the first team to do so in 1952. As of 2026, a total of 30 countries have qualified and participated in at least one world series, winning the championship 39 times. Canada holds the record for most appearances (68), while Taiwan / Chinese Taipei won the most titles (18). For U.S. states participation, see List of Little League World Series appearances by U.S. state.

== Country Participants ==
As of the 2026 Little League World Series.

Country	First LLWS	Last Appearance	Appearances	Championships	Runners-up	Third place Finishes	Record in LLWS	PCT
Aruba	2011	2025	3	0	0	0	7–7	.500
Australia	2013	2026	12	0	0	0	6–27	.182
Belgium	1981	1984	2	0	0	0	1–5	.167
Canada	1952	2026	68	0	1	2	60–141	.299
Cuba	2023	2024	2	0	0	0	2–4	.333
Curaçao	1980	2026	16	2 (2004, 2026)	4	3	55–28	.663
Czech Republic	2013	2026	6	0	0	0	1–13	.071
Dominican Republic	1978	2026	10	0	1	4	15–16	.484
France	1962	1962	1	0	0	0	1–2	.333
West Germany / Germany	1960	2012	16	0	0	1	8–40	.167
Greece	1974	1974	1	0	0	0	0–3	.000
Guam	2001	2008	5	0	0	0	9–9	.500
Italy	1979	2022	6	0	0	0	2–16	.111
Japan	1962	2026	35	11 (1967, 1968, 1976, 1999, 2001, 2003, 2010, 2012, 2013, 2015, 2017)	5	8	119–43	.735
Mexico	1957	2026	39	3 (1957, 1958, 1997)	3	6	87–68	.561
Netherlands	2007	2011	2	0	0	0	0–6	.000
Nicaragua	1968	2026	4	0	0	1	9–7	.563
Northern Mariana Islands	1993	2006	3	0	0	0	1–8	.111
Panama	1984	2026	14	0	1	1	27–26	.509
Philippines ±	1992	1992	1	0	0	0	3–2	.600
Poland	2004	2004	1	0	0	0	0–3	.000
Puerto Rico	1959	2025	14	0	0	3	16–22	.421
Russia	2001	2006	5	0	0	0	1–14	.067
Saudi Arabia	1983	2011	23	0	0	1	20–49	.290
South Korea	1984	2026	8	3 (1984, 1985, 2014)	2	0	24–9	.727
Spain	1965	2018	10	0	0	0	3–26	.103
Taiwan / Chinese Taipei	1969	2025	33	18 (1969, 1971, 1972, 1973, 1974, 1977, 1978, 1979, 1980, 1981, 1986, 1987, 1988, 1990, 1991, 1995, 1996, 2025)	4	3	98–23	.810
Turkey	1963	1963	1	0	0	0	0–2	.000
Uganda	2012	2015	2	0	0	0	2–4	.333
Venezuela	1965	2025	24	2 (1994, 2000)	0	3	54–38	.587
Total			367	39	21	36	631–661	.488

== International Finals ==
Since 1976, an international final has been played. The winner plays versus the US Champion for the LLWS title. In 2020, the entire LLWS tournament was cancelled due to the COVID-19 pandemic. The 2021 tournament exclusively featured United States teams for the first time since 1975.

As of the 2026 Little League World Series.

LLWS	Winner	Score	Runner-up	LLWS Result
1976	Tokyo, Japan	4–0	Puerto Nuevo, Puerto Rico	Champion
1977	Kaohsiung, Taiwan	9–2	Maracaibo, Venezuela	Champion
1978	Pingtung, Taiwan	3–0	Santo Domingo, Dominican Republic	Champion
1979	Taipei, Taiwan	18–0	Aviano, Italy	Champion
1980	Hualien, Taiwan	23–0	Trail, Canada	Champion
1981	Taichung, Taiwan	16–0	Trail, Canada	Champion
1982	Chiayi County, Taiwan	10–7	Rouyn-Noranda, Canada	Runner-Up
1983	Barahona, Dominican Republic	8–2	Osaka, Japan	Runner-Up
1984	Seoul, South Korea	19–0	Coquitlam, Canada	Champion
1985	Seoul, South Korea	16–0	Binbrook, Canada	Champion
1986	Tainan Park, Taiwan	11–4	Maracaibo, Venezuela	Champion
1987	Hualien, Taiwan	4–0	Moca, Dominican Republic	Champion
1988	Taichung, Taiwan	16–1	Glace Bay, Canada	Champion
1989	Kaohsiung, Taiwan	13–0	Maracaibo, Venezuela	Runner-Up
1990	Tainan, Taiwan	20–1	Trail, Canada	Champion
1991	Taichung, Taiwan	17–1	Glace Bay, Canada	Champion
1992	Zamboanga City, Philippines	5–1	Santo Domingo, Dominican Republic	Runner-Up
1993	David, Panama	5–0	Kaiserslautern, Germany	Runner-Up
1994	Maracaibo, Venezuela	10–1	Dhahran, Saudi Arabia	Champion
1995	Tainan, Taiwan	1–0	Hatillo-San Cristóbal, Dominican Republic	Champion
1996	Kaohsiung, Taiwan	7–1	San Isidro, Dominican Republic	Champion
1997	Guadalupe, Mexico	1–0	Yokohama, Japan	Champion
1998	Kashima, Japan	3–2	Langley, Canada	Runner-Up
1999	Hirakata, Japan	12–2	Yabucoa, Puerto Rico	Champion
2000	Maracaibo, Venezuela	5–4	Tokyo, Japan	Champion
2001	Tokyo, Japan	2–1	(Curaçao) Willemstad, Curacao	Champion
2002	Sendai, Japan	4–1	(Curaçao) Willemstad, Curacao	Runner-Up
2003	Tokyo, Japan	14–6	(Curaçao) Willemstad, Curacao	Champion
2004	(Curaçao) Willemstad, Curacao	4–0	Guadalupe, Mexico	Champion
2005	(Curaçao) Willemstad, Curacao	2–0	Chiba, Japan	Runner-Up
2006	Kawaguchi, Japan	3–0	Matamoros, Mexico	Runner-Up
2007	Tokyo, Japan	7–4	(Curaçao) Willemstad, Curacao	Runner-Up
2008	Matamoros, Mexico	5–4	Tokyo, Japan	Runner-Up
2009	Taoyuan, Taiwan	9–4	Reynosa, Mexico	Runner-Up
2010	Tokyo, Japan	3–2	Kaohsiung, Taiwan	Champion
2011	Hamamatsu, Japan	5–2	Mexicali, Mexico	Runner-Up
2012	Tokyo, Japan	10–2	Aguadulce, Panama	Champion
2013	Tokyo, Japan	3–2	Tijuana, Mexico	Champion
2014	Seoul, South Korea	12–3	Tokyo, Japan	Champion
2015	Tokyo, Japan	1–0 (F/7)	Mexicali, Mexico	Champion
2016	Seoul, South Korea	7–2	Aguadulce, Panama	Runner-Up
2017	Tokyo, Japan	5–0	Reynosa, Mexico	Champion
2018	Seoul, South Korea	2–1	Kawaguchi, Japan	Runner-Up
2019	(Curaçao) Willemstad, Curacao	5–4	Tokyo, Japan	Runner-Up
2020	Cancelled due to COVID-19 pandemic			
2021	No international teams participating in tournament			
2022	(Curaçao) Willemstad, Curacao	1–0	Taipei, Taiwan	Runner-Up
2023	(Curaçao) Willemstad, Curacao	2–0	Taoyuan, Taiwan	Runner-Up
2024	Taoyuan, Taiwan	4–1	Barquisimeto, Venezuela	Runner-Up
2025	Taipei, Taiwan	1–0	Santa Cruz, Aruba	Champion
2026	(Curaçao) Willemstad, Curacao	4–0	Tokyo, Japan	Champion

Country	International Championships	International Runner Up	LLWS Championships
Aruba	0	1	0
Canada	0	9	0
Curacao	6	4	2
Dominican Republic	1	5	0
Germany	0	1	0
Italy	0	1	0
Japan	14	9	9
Mexico	2	7	1
Panama	1	2	0
Philippines	1	0	0
Puerto Rico	0	2	0
Saudi Arabia	0	1	0
South Korea	5	0	3
Taiwan	17	3	13
Venezuela	2	4	2
Total	49	49	30

== Regional Appearances ==
Many countries have appeared and participated in little league baseball regional tournaments throughout history but have not yet appeared in the Little League World Series. Most of these countries still participate annually in the tournament while others no longer support little league programs. In bold 2025 participation.

Country	Region
Antigua and Barbuda	Caribbean
**Argentina**	**Latin America**
**Austria**	**Europe-Africa**
(The Bahamas) Bahamas	Caribbean
Belarus	Europe-Africa
Bermuda	Caribbean
Bolivia	Latin America
**Bonaire**	**Caribbean**
**Brazil**	**Latin America**
British Virgin Islands	Caribbean
Bulgaria	Europe-Africa
Cayman Islands	Caribbean
**Chile**	**Latin America**
**China**	**Asia-Pacific**
**Colombia**	**Latin America**
**Costa Rica**	**Latin America**
**Croatia**	**Europe-Africa**
Denmark	Europe-Africa
**Ecuador**	**Latin America**
El Salvador	Latin America
(Georgia (country)) Georgia	Europe-Africa

Country	Region
**Guatemala**	**Latin America**
**Honduras**	**Latin America**
**Hong Kong**	**Asia-Pacific**
Hungary	Europe-Africa
India	Asia-Pacific
**Indonesia**	**Asia-Pacific**
Iran	Asia-Pacific
(Republic of Ireland) Ireland	Europe-Africa
**Israel**	**Europe-Africa**
Jamaica	Caribbean
Kazakhstan	Asia-Pacific
Kuwait	Asia-Pacific
Lebanon	Asia-Pacific
**Lithuania**	**Europe-Africa**
Malaysia	Asia-Pacific
(Federated States of Micronesia) Micronesia	Asia-Pacific
Moldova	Europe-Africa
**New Zealand**	**Asia-Pacific**
Pakistan	Asia-Pacific
Palau	Asia-Pacific
Papua New Guinea	Asia-Pacific
Peru	Latin America

Country	Region
Portugal	Europe-Africa
Qatar	Asia-Pacific
**Romania**	**Europe-Africa**
(Collectivity of Saint Martin) Saint Martin	Caribbean
Serbia	Europe-Africa
Singapore	Asia-Pacific
**Sint Maarten**	**Caribbean**
**Slovakia**	**Europe-Africa**
Slovenia	Europe-Africa
South Africa	Europe-Africa
Sri Lanka	Asia-Pacific
Sweden	Europe-Africa
Switzerland	Europe-Africa
Thailand	Asia-Pacific
Trinidad and Tobago	Latin America
Tunisia	Europe-Africa
**Ukraine**	**Europe-Africa**
United Arab Emirates	Asia-Pacific
**United Kingdom**	**Europe-Africa**
**(United States Virgin Islands) U.S. Virgin Islands**	**Caribbean**
Vietnam	Asia-Pacific

== Notes ==
- Zamboanga City, Philippines appeared in the 1992 Little League World Series, winning the championship, but were stripped of their title after the completion of the tournament when it was revealed that several players did not meet eligibility requirements regarding age and residency.
- Puerto Rico shares 1976 3rd place with Virginia. The game was canceled due to weather.
- Dominican Republic shares 1987 3rd place with Indiana. The game was canceled due to weather.
- Mexico shares 2006 3rd place with Oregon. The game was canceled due to weather.
- Mexico shares 2011 3rd place with Montana. The game was canceled due to Hurricane Irene.
- The 2020 Little League World Series was cancelled due to the COVID-19 pandemic
- The 2021 Little League World Series only featured United States teams for the first time since 1975. Two teams from each of the 8 U.S. regions participated in the World Series (regional champion and runner-up)
- The 2022 Little League World Series included the return of international teams and a tournament expansion which added four regions (Metro, Mountain, Panama, Puerto Rico)

== See also ==
- List of Little League World Series appearances by U.S. state
- List of Little League World Series appearances by region
