= Little League World Series in Latin America =

Children's baseball tournament

Latin America Little League Championship
- Most recent season or competition: 2026 Little League World Series qualification
- Sport: Baseball
- Founded: 1958; 68 years ago
- Most recent champions: Ministerio Sobre Las Alas Del Aguila Little League, León, Nicaragua
- Most titles: Coquivacoa Little League, Maracaibo, Venezuela (10)

The Latin America Region has competed in the Little League World Series since its creation in 1958. Until 2001, the Latin America Region included Mexico and the Caribbean. In 2001 – when the Little League World Series expanded to sixteen teams – Mexico and the Caribbean were given their own regions. The region is open to all countries on the Latin American mainland, but is typically contested by the teams from Panama and Venezuela. Since the 2001 split, the region has been represented by either Venezuela (11 appearances) or Panama (seven appearances) at the Little League World Series, as of 2019.

Following the 2021 LLWS, Panama and the Caribbean Region countries of Cuba and Puerto Rico will take up two berths in the LLWS. Two of the three will send champions to the LLWS each year, while the third will compete in its normal region; the automatic berths will rotate annually. This scheme is part of a planned expansion of the LLWS from 16 to 20 teams that was originally scheduled to occur for 2021, but was delayed to 2022 due to COVID-19.

Teams from Latin America have won the LLWS title five times, but only four were as the Latin America Region champion. The Industrial Little League of Monterrey, Mexico, won back-to-back titles in 1957 and 1958, but the first title was as the champion of the South Region. The other three LLWS championships were won by Guadalupe, Nuevo León, Mexico, in 1997, and Maracaibo, Venezuela, in 1994 and 2000.

== Latin America Region countries ==
- Argentina
- Bolivia
- Brazil
- Chile
- Colombia
- Costa Rica
- Ecuador
- El Salvador
- Guatemala
- Guyana
- Honduras
- Nicaragua
- Panama
- Paraguay
- Peru
- Trinidad and Tobago
- Uruguay
- Venezuela

== Region champions ==
=== U.S. South Region ===
Year	Champion	City	LLWS	Record
1957	Industrial	(Mexico) Monterrey	Champions	2–0

=== Latin America Region ===
Year	Host	Champion	City	LLWS	Record
1958		Industrial	(Mexico) Monterrey	Champions	3–0
1959		San Juan	(Puerto Rico) San Juan	Quarterfinals	0–1
1960		Industrial	(Mexico) Monterrey	4th Place	1–2
1961		Industrial	(Mexico) Monterrey	3rd Place	2–1
1962		Del Norte	(Mexico) Monterrey	4th Place	1–2
1963		Obispado	(Mexico) Monterrey	5th Place	1–2
1964		Obispado	(Mexico) Monterrey	Runner-up	2–1
1965		Zulia	(Venezuela) Maracaibo	7th Place	2–1
1966		Cuauhtémoc	(Mexico) Monterrey	6th Place	1–2
1967		Linares	(Mexico) Linares	4th Place	1–2
1968		Chinandega	(Nicaragua) Chinandega	7th Place	1–2
1969		Jorge Rosas	(Puerto Rico) Mayagüez	6th Place	1–2
1970		Chinandega	(Nicaragua) Chinandega	3rd Place	2–1
1971		Caguas Gillette	(Puerto Rico) Caguas	5th Place	2–1
1972		Admiral Gallery	(Puerto Rico) San Juan	3rd Place	1–1
1973		Mitras	(Mexico) Monterrey	6th Place	1–2
1974		Coquivacoa	(Venezuela) Maracaibo	3rd Place	2–1
1975	International teams were banned by Little League				
1976		Puerto Nuevo	(Puerto Rico) San Juan	3rd Place	1–1
1977		Coquivacoa	(Venezuela) Maracaibo	4th Place	1–2
1978		La Javilla	(Dominican Republic) Santo Domingo	4th Place	1–2
1979		Luis Llorens Torres	(Puerto Rico) Santurce	5th Place	2–1
1980		Pabao	(Curaçao) Willemstad	5th Place	1–2
1981		Unidad Modelo	(Mexico) Monterrey	7th Place	1–2
1982		Coquivacoa	(Venezuela) Maracaibo	5th Place	2–1
1983		Liquito Hernández	(Dominican Republic) Barahona	Runner-up	2–1
1984		Willys R. Cook	(Panama) Bethania	5th Place	2–1
1985		Coquivacoa	(Venezuela) Maracaibo	5th Place	2–1
1986		Coquivacoa	(Venezuela) Maracaibo	4th Place	1–2
1987		Rolando Paulino	(Dominican Republic) Moca	3rd Place	1–1
1988		Curundú	(Panama) Curundú	7th Place	1–2
1989		Coquivacoa	(Venezuela) Maracaibo	3rd Place	2–1
1990		Matamoros	(Mexico) Matamoros	5th Place	1–1
1991		Luis Montas	(Dominican Republic) San Cristobal	5th Place	2–1
1992		Epy Guerrero	(Dominican Republic) Santo Domingo	3rd Place	3–1
1993		David Doleguita	(Panama) David	Runner Up	3–2
1994		Coquivacoa	(Venezuela) Maracaibo	Champions	5–0
1995		Eduardo Sosa	(Dominican Republic) Santo Domingo	3rd Place	2–2
1996		Matías Ramón Mella	(Dominican Republic) San Isidro Air Base	3rd Place	2–2
1997		Linda Vista	(Mexico) Guadalupe	Champions	5–0
1998	(Puerto Rico) Bayamón	Linda Vista	(Mexico) Guadalupe	Group Stage	0–3
1999	(Mexico) Monterrey	Juan A. Bibiloni	(Puerto Rico) Yabucoa	3rd Place	3–1
2000		Sierra Maestra	(Venezuela) Maracaibo	Champions	4–1
2001	Panama City	Santiago de Veraguas	(Panama) Santiago de Veraguas	Group Stage	1–2
2002	(Nicaragua) Managua	Los Leones	(Venezuela) Valencia	Quarterfinals	2–2
2003	(Puerto Rico) Mayagüez	Altagracia	(Venezuela) Los Puertos	Quarterfinals	3–1
2004	Panama City	Curundú	Panama City	Quarterfinals	3–1
2005	(Venezuela) Maracaibo	Los Leones	(Venezuela) Valencia	Group Stage	1–2
2006	Guatemala City	Cardenales	(Venezuela) Barquisimeto	Quarterfinals	3–1
2007	Panama City	La Victoria	(Venezuela) Maracaibo	Quarterfinals	3–1
2008	(Venezuela) Maracaibo	Coquivacoa	(Venezuela) Maracaibo	Quarterfinals	2–2
2009	(Colombia) Barranquilla	Coquivacoa	(Venezuela) Maracaibo	Group Stage	0–3
2010	Guatemala City	Chitré	(Panama) Chitré	Group Stage	2–2
2011	(Costa Rica) San José	Gran Maracay	(Venezuela) Maracay	Int'l Semifinal	2–2
2012	(Panama) Aguadulce	Aguadulce	(Panama) Aguadulce	4th Place	3–3
2013	(Ecuador) Guayaquil	Aguadulce	(Panama) Aguadulce	Int'l Semifinal	3–2
2014	(Nicaragua) Managua	Coquivacoa	(Venezuela) Maracaibo	Round 3	2–2
2015	(Colombia) Barranquilla	Cardenales	(Venezuela) Barquisimeto	Int'l Semifinal	2–2
2016	Panama City	Aguadulce	(Panama) Aguadulce	3rd place	4–1
2017	(Colombia) Barranquilla	Luz Maracaibo	(Venezuela) Maracaibo	Round 3	2–2
2018	Panama City	Vacamonte	(Panama) Arraiján	Round 2	1–2
2019	(Panama) Aguadulce	Cacique Mara	(Venezuela) Maracaibo	Round 2	2–2
2020	Cancelled due to COVID-19 pandemic				
2021	No international participant				
2022	(Nicaragua) Managua	14 de Septiembre	(Nicaragua) Managua	Round 4	3–2
2023	(Venezuela) Maracaibo	San Francisco	(Venezuela) Maracaibo	Round 3	1–2
2024	Panama City	Cardenales	(Venezuela) Barquisimeto	3rd place	5–2
2025	(Ecuador) Guayaquil	Cardenales	(Venezuela) Barquisimeto	Int'l Semifinal	3–2
2026	Guatemala City	Ministerio Sobre Las Alas Del Aguila	(Nicaragua) León	Int'l Semifinal	3–2

=== Panama Region ===
Year	Champion	City	LLWS	Record
2022	Aguadulce Cabezera LL	(Panama) Aguadulce, Coclé	Round 3	1–2
2023	Activo 20–30 LL	(Panama) Santiago de Veraguas	Round 3	2–2
2024				
2025	Vacamonte LL	(Panama) Arraijan	Round 2	1–2
2026	David Doleguita LL	(Panama) David	Round 2	0–2

=== Results by country ===
Table includes results from the Latin America and Panama regions through the 2026 Little League World Series. Italics indicates team no longer competes in Latin America Region. Mexico now has its own region, while Puerto Rico, Dominican Republic, and Curaçao compete in the Caribbean region.

Country	Latin America Championships	LLWS Championships	Record in LLWS	PCT
Venezuela	24	2	54–38	.587
Mexico	13	2	20–20	.500
Panama	10	0	27–26	.509
Dominican Republic	7	0	13–10	.565
Puerto Rico	7	0	10–8	.556
Nicaragua	4	0	9–7	.563
Curaçao	1	0	1–2	.333
Total	66	4	134–111	.547

== See also ==
- Baseball awards § Americas
- Little League World Series (Caribbean Region)
- Little League World Series in Mexico

Latin America Region in other Little League divisions

- Intermediate League
- Junior League
- Senior League – Caribbean
- Senior League – Latin America
- Big League
