= Little League World Series in Canada =

Children's baseball tournament

Canadian Little League Championship
- Most recent season or competition: 2026 Little League World Series qualification
- Sport: Baseball
- Founded: 1958; 68 years ago
- Country: Canada
- Most recent champions: Little Mountain Little League, Vancouver, British Columbia
- Most titles: Valleyfield Little League, Salaberry-de-Valleyfield, Quebec (8)

Little League Baseball has been played in Canada since 1951. Cape Breton, Nova Scotia and Vancouver, British Columbia were the first leagues outside the United States. Approximately 500 leagues now operate in Canada, making it the second-largest country in Little League participation. In 1952, Montreal, Quebec was the first foreign entry in the Little League World Series. In 1953, Little Mountain Little League of Vancouver advanced to the World Series as representative of the Western Region. In 1958, Canada was given an automatic berth in the LLWS and have since participated in every tournament, with the exception of 1975. Until 1965, the Canadian region consisted of only teams from Ontario and Quebec. Prior to 1966, the western provinces participated in tournament play with American teams in the original West Region, while the Maritime provinces were excluded. In 1965, Canada began play as a full region.

Canada has never won the series, but in 1965 Stoney Creek Optimist Little League of Ontario reached the final. Valleyfield Little League (Salaberry-de-Valleyfield) is the league with the most championships (8); the Whalley LL of Surrey, British Columbia has seven; and Glace Bay LL and Trail are third with five.

== Regions ==
The Prairie Provinces Division has been replaced by two provincial championship tournaments—in Alberta and Saskatchewan. The Atlantic Provinces Division continues to have a divisional championship.

British Columbia
Prairies
Ontario
Quebec
Atlantic

== Canadian Championships ==
=== Finals ===
Year	Venue	Winner	Result	Runner-up
1958	N/A	(Quebec) Valleyfield LL (Valleyfield)	17–9	(Ontario) Glebe LL (Ottawa)
1959	N/A	(Quebec) Valleyfield LL (Valleyfield)	8–2	(Ontario) Legion LL (Brockville)
1960	N/A	(Ontario) Parkdale Lions LL (Toronto)	10–0	(Quebec) Kiwanis LL (Montreal)
1961	N/A	(Quebec) Kiwanis East LL (Montreal)	N/A	(Ontario) Optimist LL (Stoney Creek)
1962	N/A	(Ontario) Optimist LL (Stoney Creek)	18–6	(Quebec) Valleyfield LL (Valleyfield)
1963	Valleyfield	(Quebec) Valleyfield LL (Valleyfield)	6–1	(Ontario) International LL (Fort William)
1964	N/A	(Quebec) Valleyfield LL (Valleyfield)	4–3	(Ontario) Optimist LL (Stoney Creek)
1965	(Ontario) Dundas	(Ontario) Optimist LL (Stoney Creek)	4–0	(British Columbia) East Trail LL (Trail)
1966	(Ontario) Stoney Creek	(Ontario) Fort William Americans LL (Thunder Bay)	10–5	Optimist LL (Stoney Creek, Ontario)
1967	(Quebec) Valleyfield	(British Columbia) East Trail LL (Trail)	5–0	(Ontario) Windsor East LL (Windsor)
1968	(Quebec) St. Laurent	(Quebec) Sher-Lenn LL (Sherbrooke)	1–0	(British Columbia) Whalley LL (Surrey)
1969	(British Columbia) Victoria	(Quebec) Valleyfield LL (Valleyfield)	4–0	(British Columbia) Collingwood LL (Vancouver)
1970	(Ontario) Thunder Bay	(Quebec) Valleyfield LL (Valleyfield)	2–0 (F/7)	(Alberta) Norcrest LL (Lethbridge)
1971	(Quebec) St. Laurent	(Ontario) Legion LL (Brockville)	2–0	(British Columbia) Forest Hills LL (North Vancouver)
1972	(Alberta) Edmonton	(Ontario) South Canadian LL (Windsor)	6–5	(British Columbia) Jaycee LL (North Vancouver
1973	(British Columbia) Saanich	(British Columbia) Whalley LL (Surrey)	1–0	(Ontario) Legion LL (Brockville)
1974	(Ontario) Mississauga	(British Columbia) Vic-West LL (Esquimalt)	8–2	(Alberta) Norcrest LL (Lethbridge)
1975	(Alberta) Calgary	(Ontario) Port Arthur Continental LL (Thunder Bay)	6–2	(Alberta) Centennial LL (Calgary)
1976	(Quebec) Sherbrooke	(British Columbia) Trail LL (Trail)	3–0	(Ontario) Parkdale Lions LL (Toronto)
1977	(British Columbia) Surrey	(Alberta) Norcrest LL (Lethbridge)	3–1	(British Columbia) Whalley LL (Surrey)
1978	(Ontario) Windsor	(British Columbia) Whalley LL (Surrey)	18–3	(Ontario) Windsor North IOOG LL (Windsor)
1979	(Alberta) Lethbridge	(Quebec) Sher-Lenn LL (Sherbrooke)	8–1	(Alberta) Lakeside LL (Lethbridge)
1980	(Ontario) Copper Cliff	(British Columbia) Trail LL (Trail)	1–0	(Alberta) Centennial LL (Calgary)
1981	(British Columbia) Vancouver	(British Columbia) Trail LL (Trail)	8–0	(New Brunswick) Lancaster (Saint John)
1982	(Quebec) Boucherville	(Quebec) Rotary LL (Rouyn)	5–3	(Nova Scotia) Glace Bay LL (Glace Bay)
1983	(New Brunswick) Saint John	(Quebec) Sher-Mont LL (Sherbrooke)	2–1	(British Columbia) Whalley LL (Surrey)
1984	(Saskatchewan) Moose Jaw	(British Columbia) Coquitlam LL (Coquitlam)	8–4	(Ontario) Sandwich West Turtle Club LL (Windsor)
1985	(Ontario) Brockville	(Ontario) Glanbrook LL (Binbrook)	3–1	(British Columbia) Trail LL (Trail)
1986	(Quebec) Noranda	(Quebec) Valleyfield LL (Valleyfield)	5–1	(Ontario) Pinecrest LL (Ottawa)
1987	(British Columbia) Trail	(Nova Scotia) Glace Bay LL (Glace Bay)	5–1	(British Columbia) Stuart Channel LL (Chemainus)
1988	(Nova Scotia) Glace Bay	(Nova Scotia) Glace Bay LL (Glace Bay)	1–0	(Ontario) Pinecrest LL (Ottawa)
1989	(Alberta) Edmonton	(Ontario) High Park LL (Toronto)	10–2	(Alberta) Confederation Park (Edmonton)
1990	(Ontario) Stoney Creek	(British Columbia) Trail LL (Trail)	9–6	(Alberta) Confederation Park (Edmonton)
1991	(British Columbia) Victoria	(Nova Scotia) Glace Bay LL (Glace Bay)	6–0	(Ontario) Optimist LL (Stoney Creek)
1992	(Quebec) Valleyfield	(Quebec) Valleyfield LL (Valleyfield)	5–0	(Nova Scotia) Glace Bay LL (Glace Bay)
1993	(New Brunswick) Saint John	(British Columbia) Lynn Valley LL (North Vancouver)	2–1	(Quebec) Valleyfield LL (Valleyfield)
1994	(Alberta) Calgary	(Nova Scotia) Glace Bay LL (Glace Bay)	4–0	(Ontario) High Park LL (Toronto)
1995	(Ontario) Perth	(Ontario) High Park LL (Toronto)	5–1	(Nova Scotia) Glace Bay LL (Glace Bay)
1996	(British Columbia) Prince George	(British Columbia) Kennedy-Surrey LL (Surrey)	5–0	(Ontario) High Park LL (Toronto)
1997	(Alberta) Medicine Hat	(British Columbia) Whalley LL (Surrey)	8–2	(Ontario) High Park LL (Toronto)
1998	(Nova Scotia) Glace Bay	(British Columbia) Langley LL (Langley)	4–1	(Nova Scotia) Glace Bay LL (Glace Bay)
1999	(Quebec) Valleyfield	(British Columbia) Gordon Head LL (Victoria)	5–2	(Quebec) Valleyfield LL (Valleyfield)
2000	(Ontario) LaSalle	(Ontario) High Park LL (Toronto)	4–1	(Quebec) Valleyfield LL (Valleyfield)
2001	(British Columbia) Vancouver	(Alberta) Calgary West LL (Calgary)	5–3	(Ontario) High Park LL (Toronto)
2002	(Alberta) Lethbridge	(Saskatchewan) North Regina LL (Regina)	5–0	(Ontario) Gloucester LL (Ottawa)
2003	(Nova Scotia) Sydney	(Nova Scotia) Glace Bay LL (Glace Bay)	2–0 (*)	(Saskatchewan) Moose Jaw LL (Moose Jaw)
2004	(Quebec) Brossard	(Ontario) East Nepean LL (Nepean)	4–1	(Quebec) N.D.G. Minor Baseball League LL (Montreal)
2005	(Ontario) Timmins	(British Columbia) Whalley LL (Surrey)	6–1	(Ontario) High Park LL (Toronto)
2006	(British Columbia) Surrey	(British Columbia) Whalley LL (Surrey)	10–0	(Ontario) East Nepean LL (Nepean)
2007	(Saskatchewan) Regina	(British Columbia) White Rock South Surrey LL (White Rock)	14–4 (F/4)	(Alberta) Calgary West LL (Calgary)
2008	(Nova Scotia) Sydney Mines	(British Columbia) White Rock South Surrey LL (White Rock)	11–4	(Nova Scotia) Glace Bay LL (Glace Bay)
2009	(Quebec) Val-d'Or	(British Columbia) Hastings Community LL (Vancouver)	9–2	(Ontario) Turtle Club LL (LaSalle)
2010	(Ontario) Ancaster	(British Columbia) Little Mountain LL (Vancouver)	13–1 (F/4)	(Ontario) Ancaster LL (Ancaster)
2011	(British Columbia) North Vancouver	(British Columbia) Langley LL (Langley)	11–0 (F/4)	(Quebec) Valleyfield LL (Valleyfield)
2012	(Alberta) Edmonton	(British Columbia) Hastings Community LL (Vancouver)	11–1 (F/4)	(Alberta) Southwest LL (Lethbridge)
2013	(Nova Scotia) Glace Bay	(Ontario) East Nepean LL (Ottawa)	5–1	(British Columbia) White Rock South Surrey LL (White Rock)
2014	(Quebec) Valleyfield	(British Columbia) South Vancouver LL (Vancouver)	4–1	(Ontario) High Park LL (Toronto)
2015	(Ontario) Nepean	(British Columbia) White Rock South Surrey LL (White Rock)	16–0 (F/5)	(Ontario) East Nepean LL (Ottawa)
2016	(British Columbia) Vancouver	(British Columbia) Hastings Community LL (Vancouver)	1–0	(British Columbia) Whalley LL (Surrey)
2017	(Alberta) Medicine Hat	(British Columbia) White Rock South Surrey LL (White Rock)	12–5	(Quebec) Diamond Baseball Academy LL (Mirabel)
2018	(Quebec) Mirabel	(British Columbia) Whalley LL (Surrey)	11–0	(Nova Scotia) Glace Bay LL (Glace Bay)
2019	(Ontario) Ancaster	(British Columbia) Coquitlam LL (Coquitlam)	6–3	(Quebec) Mirabel Diamond LL (Mirabel)
2022	(Alberta) Calgary	(British Columbia) Little Mountain LL (Vancouver)	9–4	(Saskatchewan) Moose Jaw LL (Moose Jaw)
2023	(Saskatchewan) Regina	(Saskatchewan) North Regina LL (Regina)	4–3	(British Columbia) Little Mountain LL (Vancouver)
2024	(Ontario) Kingston	(British Columbia) Whalley LL (Surrey)	10–1	(Alberta) Medicine Hat LL (Medicine Hat)
2025	(British Columbia) Victoria	(British Columbia) Little Mountain LL (Vancouver)	8–0	(British Columbia) Layritz LL (Victoria)
2026	(Nova Scotia) Glace Bay	(British Columbia) Little Mountain LL (Vancouver)	4–0 (F/8)	(Ontario) Ottawa West LL (Ottawa)

=== Leagues with most titles ===
League	City	Titles	Years
(Quebec) Valleyfield	Salaberry-de-Valleyfield, Quebec	8	1958, 1959, 1963, 1964, 1969, 1970, 1986, 1992
(British Columbia) Whalley	Surrey, British Columbia	7	1973, 1978, 1997, 2005, 2006, 2018, 2024
(British Columbia) Trail	Trail, British Columbia	5	1967, 1976, 1980, 1981, 1990
(Nova Scotia) Glace Bay	Glace Bay, Nova Scotia	5	1987, 1988, 1991, 1994, 2003
(British Columbia) Little Mountain	Vancouver, British Columbia	4	2010, 2022, 2025, 2026
(British Columbia) White Rock South Surrey	White Rock, British Columbia	4	2007, 2008, 2015, 2017
(British Columbia) Hastings Community	Vancouver, British Columbia	3	2009, 2012, 2016
(Ontario) High Park	Toronto, Ontario	3	1989, 1995, 2000

=== By province ===
Province	First LLCR	Appearances	Championships	Runner up
Alberta	1966	51	2	10
British Columbia	1965	60	32	13
New Brunswick	1978	11	0	1
Nova Scotia	1968	41	5	6
Ontario	1958	66	13	26
Quebec	1958	65	13	9
Saskatchewan	1967	23	2	2

== Canada in the LLWS ==
=== Participations ===
Year	League	City	Region	LLWS	Record
1952	Montreal	(Quebec) Montreal	(United States) Region 1	Quarterfinal	0–1
1953	Jaycee National	(British Columbia) Vancouver	(United States) Region 8	Quarterfinal	0–1
1958	Valleyfield	(Quebec) Salaberry-de-Valleyfield	Canada	Quarterfinal	0–1
1959	Valleyfield	(Quebec) Salaberry-de-Valleyfield	Canada	Quarterfinal	0–1
1960	Toronto	(Ontario) Toronto	Canada	8th Place	0–3
1961	Kiwanis-East	(Quebec) Montreal	Canada	7th Place	1–2
1962	Stoney Creek	(Ontario) Stoney Creek	Canada	8th Place	0–3
1963	Valleyfield	(Quebec) Salaberry-de-Valleyfield	Canada	7th Place	0–2
1964	Valleyfield	(Quebec) Salaberry-de-Valleyfield	Canada	6th Place	1–2
1965	Stoney Creek	(Ontario) Stoney Creek	Canada	Runner up	2–1
1966	Windsor	(Ontario) Windsor	Canada	8th Place	0–3
1967	East Trail	(British Columbia) Trail	Canada	7th Place (Shared)	0–2
1968	Sherbrooke-Lennoxville	(Quebec) Sherbrooke	Canada	4th Place	1–2
1969	Valleyfield	(Quebec) Salaberry-de-Valleyfield	Canada	7th Place	1–2
1970	Valleyfield	(Quebec) Salaberry-de-Valleyfield	Canada	8th Place	0–3
1971	Brockville	(Ontario) Brockville	Canada	7th Place	1–2
1972	Windsor	(Ontario) Windsor	Canada	6th Place	1–2
1973	Whalley	(British Columbia) Surrey	Canada	5th Place	2–1
1974	Esquimalt-West	(British Columbia) Victoria	Canada	7th Place	1–2
1976	Trail	(British Columbia) Trail	Canada	7th Place	1–2
1977	Norcrest	(Alberta) Lethbridge	Canada	8th Place	0–3
1978	Whalley	(British Columbia) Surrey	Canada	5th Place	2–1
1979	Sherbrooke-Lennoxville	(Quebec) Sherbrooke	Canada	6th Place	1–2
1980	Trail	(British Columbia) Trail	Canada	4th Place	1–2
1981	Trail	(British Columbia) Trail	Canada	4th Place	1–2
1982	Rouyn	(Quebec) Rouyn	Canada	4th Place	1–2
1983	Sherbrooke-Fleurimont	(Quebec) Sherbrooke	Canada	8th Place	0–3
1984	Coquitlam	(British Columbia) Coquitlam	Canada	4th Place	1–2
1985	Binbrook	(Ontario) Binbrook	Canada	4th Place	1–2
1986	Valleyfield	(Quebec) Salaberry-de-Valleyfield	Canada	6th Place	1–2
1987	Glace Bay	(Nova Scotia) Glace Bay	Canada	5th Place (Shared)	1–1
1988	Glace Bay	(Nova Scotia) Glace Bay	Canada	4th Place	1–2
1989	High Park	(Ontario) Toronto	Canada	8th Place	0–3
1990	Trail	(British Columbia) Trail	Canada	3rd Place	2–1
1991	Glace Bay	(Nova Scotia) Glace Bay	Canada	4th Place	1–2
1992	Valleyfield	(Quebec) Salaberry-de-Valleyfield	Canada	Group Stage	1–2
1993	Lynn Valley	(British Columbia) Lynn Valley	Canada	Group Stage	1–2
1994	Glace Bay	(Nova Scotia) Glace Bay	Canada	Group Stage	0–3
1995	High Park	(Ontario) Toronto	Canada	Group Stage	0–3
1996	Kennedy	(British Columbia) Surrey	Canada	Group Stage	1–2
1997	Whalley	(British Columbia) Surrey	Canada	Group Stage	0–3
1998	Langley	(British Columbia) Langley	Canada	3rd Place (Shared)	3–1
1999	Gordon Head	(British Columbia) Victoria	Canada	Group Stage	1–2
2000	High Park	(Ontario) Toronto	Canada	Group Stage	0–3
2001	Calgary West	(Alberta) Calgary	Canada	Group Stage	1–2
2002	North Regina	(Saskatchewan) Regina	Canada	Group Stage	0–3
2003	Glace Bay	(Nova Scotia) Glace Bay	Canada	Group Stage	0–3
2004	East Nepean	(Ontario) Ottawa	Canada	Group Stage	1–2
2005	Whalley	(British Columbia) Surrey	Canada	Int'l Semifinal	2–2
2006	Whalley	(British Columbia) Surrey	Canada	Group Stage	1–2
2007	White Rock-South Surrey	(British Columbia) White Rock	Canada	Group Stage	1–2
2008	White Rock-South Surrey	(British Columbia) White Rock	Canada	Group Stage	1–2
2009	Hastings Community	(British Columbia) Vancouver	Canada	Group Stage	1–2
2010	Little Mountain	(British Columbia) Vancouver	Canada	Group Stage	1–2
2011	Langley	(British Columbia) Langley	Canada	Round 3	2–2
2012	Hastings Community	(British Columbia) Vancouver	Canada	Round 2	1–2
2013	East Nepean	(Ontario) Ottawa	Canada	Round 2	1–2
2014	South Vancouver	(British Columbia) Vancouver	Canada	Round 1	0–3
2015	White Rock South Surrey	(British Columbia) White Rock	Canada	Round 1	0–3
2016	Hastings Community	(British Columbia) Vancouver	Canada	Round 2	1–2
2017	White Rock South Surrey	(British Columbia) White Rock	Canada	Int'l Semifinal	2–2
2018	Whalley	(British Columbia) Surrey	Canada	Round 3	2–2
2019	Coquitlam	(British Columbia) Coquitlam	Canada	Round 2	1–2
2020	Cancelled due to COVID-19 pandemic				
2021	No international participant				
2022	Little Mountain	(British Columbia) Vancouver	Canada	Round 3	2–2
2023	North Regina	(Saskatchewan) Regina	Canada	Round 2	1–2
2024	Whalley	(British Columbia) Surrey	Canada	Round 2	1–2
2025	Little Mountain	(British Columbia) Vancouver	Canada	Round 3	1–2
2026	Little Mountain	(British Columbia) Vancouver	Canada	Round 4	3–2

=== LLWS by province ===
As of the 2026 Little League World Series.

Province	First LLWS	Most recent	LLWS berths	LLWS championships	Record in LLWS	PCT
British Columbia	1953	2026	33	0	40–64	.385
Quebec	1952	1992	14	0	8–27	.229
Ontario	1960	2013	12	0	7–29	.194
Nova Scotia	1987	2003	5	0	3–11	.214
Alberta	1977	2001	2	0	1–5	.167
Saskatchewan	2002	2023	2	0	1–5	.167
Total			68	0	60–141	.299

Of the provinces in which Little League–affiliated leagues operate, New Brunswick is the only one yet to be represented in the LLWS. The provinces of Manitoba, Newfoundland and Labrador, and Prince Edward Island do not have any leagues affiliated with Little League Baseball; the same holds true for Canada's three territories.

== See also ==
- Baseball awards § World

Canada Region in other Little League divisions

- Intermediate League
- Junior League
- Senior League
- Big League (discontinued in 2016)
