= Little League World Series in Europe =

Children's baseball tournament

Europe and Africa Little League Championship
- Most recent season or competition: 2026 Little League World Series qualification
- Sport: Baseball
- Founded: 1960; 66 years ago
- Countries: European and African
- Most recent champions: South Czech Republic Little League, Brno, Czech Republic
- Most titles: Arabian American Little League, Dhahran, Saudi Arabia (17)

Europe first participated in the Little League World Series in 1960. Teams from Europe were given a berth in the LLWS each year between 1960 and 2000 (with the exception of the temporary ban of international teams in 1975). In 2001, the region was split into two co-terminus regions: Europe (later EMEA) Region and Transatlantic Region. The Europe Region comprised mostly native European teams while the Transatlantic Region comprised mostly American expatriates. This distinction was eliminated in 2008; from 2008 to 2012, teams made up of either native Europeans or American expatriates were eligible to qualify from the Europe Region.

Starting with the 2013 LLWS, the region was renamed the Europe and Africa Region. African countries were added as a result of a major reorganization of the international (non-U.S.) regions. This move was triggered by Little League's announcement that Australia would receive its own LLWS berth starting in 2013. Two Middle Eastern countries, Israel and Turkey, have been part of European regions since they instituted Little League programs, as they were then members of the European zone of the International Baseball Federation and remain in the same zone under baseball's modern international governing body, the World Baseball Softball Confederation. Israel and Turkey have stayed in the renamed Europe and Africa Region to this day.

No team from the European region has ever reached the final of the Little League World Series. The best finishes for a European team occurred in 1979, 1993 and 1994, when European teams reached the semifinals. Aviano, Italy, made it that far — in the 8-team format — in 1979. Kaiserslautern, Germany and Dhahran, Saudi Arabia made the International final in back-to-back years in 1993 and 1994.

== Europe and Africa Region Countries ==
- Austria
- Belarus
- Belgium
- Bulgaria
- Croatia
- Czech Republic
- Denmark
- Ethiopia
- France
- Gabon
- Georgia
- Germany
- Ghana
- Greece
- Hungary
- Ireland
- Italy
- Israel
- Kazakhstan
- Kenya
- Lithuania
- Moldova
- Netherlands
- Nigeria
- Poland
- Portugal
- Romania
- Russia
- Serbia
- Sierra Leone
- Slovakia
- Slovenia
- South Africa
- Spain
- Sweden
- South West Africa
- Switzerland
- Tanzania
- Turkey
- Uganda
- Ukraine
- Zambia
- Zimbabwe
- British Hong Kong
- Southern Rhodesia
- Rhodesia
- United Kingdom

== European champions (1960–2000) ==
Year	Champion	City	LLWS	Record
1960	Berlin Command LL	(West Germany) Berlin	Sixth Place	1–2
1961	Pirmasens Housing Area LL	(West Germany) Pirmasens	Eighth Place	0–3
1962	Poitiers Post LL	(France) Poitiers	Sixth Place	1–2
1963	İzmir LL	(Turkey) İzmir	Fourth Place	0–2
1964	Wiesbaden LL	(West Germany) Wiesbaden Air Force Base	Eighth Place	0–3
1965	Rota LL	(Spain) Rota	Eighth Place	0–3
1966	Rhein-Main LL	(West Germany) Rhein-Main Air Base	Seventh Place	1–2
1967	Rota LL	(Spain) Rota	Seventh Place (tie)	0–2
1968	Wiesbaden LL	(West Germany) Wiesbaden Air Force Base	Eighth Place	0–3
1969	Wiesbaden LL	(West Germany) Wiesbaden Air Force Base	Eighth Place	0–3
1970	Wiesbaden LL	(West Germany) Wiesbaden Air Force Base	Sixth Place	1–2
1971	Madrid LL	(Spain) Madrid	Fourth Place	1–2
1972	Torrejon Air Base LL	(Spain) Madrid	Eighth Place	0–3
1973	Bitburg AB LL	(West Germany) Bitburg Air Base	Seventh Place	1–2
1974	Athena Airport LL	(Greece) Athens	Eighth Place	0–3
1975	No international participant			
1976	Kaiserslautern LL	(West Germany) Kaiserslautern	Sixth Place	1–2
1977	Torrejon Air Base LL	(Spain) Madrid	Seventh Place	1–2
1978	Torrejon Air Base LL	(Spain) Madrid	Eighth Place	0–3
1979	Aviano Air Base LL	(Italy) Aviano	Fourth Place	1–2
1980	Torrejon Air Base LL	(Spain) Madrid	Eighth Place	0–3
1981	SHAPE LL	(Belgium) Waterloo	Eighth Place	0–3
1982	Torrejon Air Base LL	(Spain) Madrid	Sixth Place	1–2
1983	Arabian Gulf LL	(Saudi Arabia) Al Khobar	Seventh Place	1–2
1984	Brussels Sports Association LL	(Belgium) Brussels	Seventh Place	1–2
1985	Arabian Gulf LL	(Saudi Arabia) Al Khobar	Eighth Place	0–3
1986	Torrejon Air Base LL	(Spain) Madrid	Eighth Place	0–3
1987	Aramco LL	(Saudi Arabia) Dhahran	Fifth Place (tie)	1–1
1988	Aramco LL	(Saudi Arabia) Dhahran	Fifth Place	2–1
1989	Aramco LL	(Saudi Arabia) Dhahran	Sixth Place	1–2
1990	Falcon LL	(West Germany) Ramstein Air Base	Seventh Place (tie)	0–2
1991	Arabian American LL	(Saudi Arabia) Dhahran	Eighth Place	0–3
1992	Kaiserslautern LL	(Germany) Kaiserslautern	4th Place, Group Stage	0–3
1993	Kaiserslautern LL	(Germany) Kaiserslautern	Third Place (tie)	2–2
1994	Arabian American LL	(Saudi Arabia) Dhahran	Third Place (tie)	2–2
1995	Arabian American LL	(Saudi Arabia) Dhahran	3rd Place, Group Stage	1–2
1996	Arabian American LL	(Saudi Arabia) Dhahran	4th Place, Group Stage	0–3
1997	Arabian American LL	(Saudi Arabia) Dhahran	3rd Place, Group Stage	1–2
1998	Arabian American LL	(Saudi Arabia) Dhahran	3rd Place, Group Stage	1–2
1999	Ramstein American LL	(Germany) Ramstein Air Base	4th Place, Group Stage	0–3
2000	Arabian American LL	(Saudi Arabia) Dhahran	3rd Place, Group Stage	1–2

== Europe/Europe, Middle East & Africa Region (2001–2007) ==
In 2001, with the LLWS expanding to sixteen teams, the European region split into two co-terminous regions. The Europe region consisted of teams that were primarily made up of players native to each country; no team could have more than three players from the United States, Canada, or Japan. The Europe region was named the Europe, Middle East, and Africa (EMEA) region between 2004 and 2007; however, no Middle Eastern or African team participated in qualifiers for the EMEA Series berth (although Kenya sent a team to the European qualifier in 2001 and South Africa did the same in 2003). In 2008, Little League removed the native players rule and split the EMEA and Transatlantic region into the Europe and Middle East-Africa regions. The following teams represented the European region after 2000:

Year	Champion	City	LLWS	Record
2001	Khovrino LL	(Russia) Moscow	4th place, Pool D	0–3
2002	Khovrino LL	(Russia) Moscow	4th place, Pool D	0–3
2003	Khovrino LL	(Russia) Moscow	3rd place, Pool D	1–2
2004	Kutno LL	(Poland) Kutno	4th place, Pool C	0–3
2005	Brateevo LL	(Russia) Moscow	4th place, Pool C	0–3
2006	Brateevo LL	(Russia) Moscow	4th place, Pool D	0–3
2007	Windmills LL	(Netherlands) Apeldoorn	4th place, Pool D	0–3

== Transatlantic Region (2001–2007) ==
The Transatlantic region encompassed the same territory as the Europe/EMEA region, but consisted of teams that were made up of at least 51% American, Canadian, or Japanese citizens.

=== Regional championship ===
Below are the champions of the Transatlantic region, along with participants for each year. The year's winner is indicated in green.

Year	Austria	Belgium	England	Germany	Italy	Netherlands	Saudi Arabia	Spain	United Arab Emirates
2001	Vienna LL; Vienna	Belgium Int'l LL; Brussels	London Area Youth LL; London	Eifel LL; Bitburg/Spangdahlem	Naples LL; Naples	No Participant	Arabian American LL; Dhahran	Rota LL; Rota	No Participant
2002	N/A; Austria	N/A; Belgium	N/A; England	N/A; Germany	N/A; Italy	N/A; Netherlands	Arabian American LL; Dharhan	N/A; Spain	No Participant
2003	AIBC LL; Vienna	SHAPE and Waterloo LL; Brussels	London Area Youth; London	Ramstein LL; Ramstein	Naples LL; Naples	Brunssum/Schinnen LL; Brunssum	Arabian American LL; Dhahran	Rota LL; Rota	No Participant
2004	No Participant	SHAPE and Waterloo LL; Brussels	London Area Youth; London	Ramstein American LL; Ramstein	Naples LL; Naples	Geilenkirchen-American/Brunssum/Schinnen LL; Brunssum/Geilenkirchen	Arabian American LL; Dhahran	Madrid LL; Madrid	No Participant
2005	No Participant	SHAPE and Brussels LL; Brussels	East Anglia LL; Suffolk	Ramstein LL; Ramstein	Naples LL; Naples	Brunssum/Schinnen LL; Brunssum	Arabian American LL; Dhahran	Rota LL; Rota	No Participant
2006	No Participant	SHAPE and Waterloo LL; Brussels	London Area Youth LL; London	Ramstein LL; Ramstein	Naples LL; Naples	No Participant	Arabian American LL; Dhahran	No Participant	Dubai LL; Dubai
2007	No Participant	No Participant	London Area Youth LL; London	Stuttgart American LL; Stuttgart	Naples LL; Naples	No Participant	Arabian American LL; Dhahran	No Participant	Dubai LL; Dubai

=== LLWS performance ===
Year	Champion	City	LLWS	Record
2001	Arabian American LL	(Saudi Arabia) Dhahran	3rd place, Pool C	1–2
2002	Arabian American LL	(Saudi Arabia) Dhahran	3rd place, Pool C	2–1
2003	Arabian American LL	(Saudi Arabia) Dhahran	3rd place, Pool C	1–2
2004	Arabian American LL	(Saudi Arabia) Dhahran	3rd place, Pool D	1–2
2005	Arabian American LL	(Saudi Arabia) Dhahran	4th place, Pool D	0–3
2006	Arabian American LL	(Saudi Arabia) Dhahran	Int'l Semifinal	2–2
2007	Arabian American LL	(Saudi Arabia) Dhahran	4th place, Pool C	0–2

== Europe Region (2008–2012) ==
From 2008 to 2012, Europe had its own region.

=== Regional Championships ===
Below are the champions of the Europe region, along with participants for each year. The year's winner is indicated in green. A Dash, "-", indicates country had no participant that year.

Year	Belarus	Belgium	Bulgaria	Czech Republic	England	Germany	Hungary	(Republic of Ireland) Ireland	Italy	Lithuania	Moldova	Netherlands	Poland	Serbia	Sweden	Turkey	Ukraine
2008	-	Brussels LL; Brussels	Dupnitsa LL; Dupnitsa	South Moravia LL; South Moravia	London Area Youth LL; London	Baden Wuerttemberg LL; Mannheim	-	Ireland LL; Dublin	Emilia LL; Emilia	Vilnius LL; Vilnius	Kvint LL; Tiraspol	Windmills Utrecht LL; Utrecht	BUKS Gepardy; Zory LL; Żory	-	Malardalen LL; Malardalen	Turkiye LL; Istanbul	Kirovograd Center/Nove Celo LL; Kirovograd
2009	Brest Zubrs LL; Brest	-	Dupnitsa LL; Dupnitsa	South Moravia LL; South Moravia	London Area Youth LL; London	KMC American LL; Ramstein	-	-	Marche LL; Marche	Vilnius LL; Vilnius	-	Alkmaar LL; Alkmaar	Żory/Rybnik/ Jastrzębie LL; Slask	-	-	Mediterranean LL; Istanbul	Kirovograd Center/Nove Celo LL; Kirovograd
2010	Brest Zubrs LL; Brest	Flanders East LL; Antwerp	-	South Moravia LL; South Moravia	London Youth Area LL; London	KMC American LL; Ramstein	-	-	Friuli-Venezia Giulia LL; Friuli V.G.	Vilnius LL; Vilnius	Kvint LL; Tiraspol	Kennemerland LL; Haarlem	Zory/Jastrzebie/ Rybnik LL; Slask	-	-	-	Kirovograd Center LL; Kirovograd
2011	Brest Zubrs LL; Brest	Flanders West LL; Flanders	-	South Moravia LL; South Moravia	London Area Youth LL; London	-	-	-	Emilia LL; Emilia	Vilnius LL; Vilnius	Kvint LL; Tiraspol	Rotterdam LL; Rotterdam	Kutno LL; Kutno	-	Stockholm LL; Stockholm	-	Kirovograd Center LL/Nove Celo LL; Kirovograd
2012	Brest Zubrs LL; Brest	Flanders East LL; Antwerp	-	South Moravia LL; Prague	London Area Youth LL; London	KMC American LL; Ramstein	MOBSSZ Debrecen/Janossomorja LL; Budapest/ Debrecen/ Jánossomorja	-	Lazio LL; Lazio	Kaunas LL; Kaunas	-	Nord-Holland LL; Alkmaar	Kutno LL; Kutno	Serbia LL; Belgrade	-	-	Kirovograd Center LL; Kirovograd

=== LLWS Performance ===
Year	Champion	City	LLWS	Record
2008	Emilia LL	(Italy) Emilia	4th place, Pool C	0–3
2009	KMC American LL	(Germany) Kaiserslautern	4th place, Pool D	0–3
2010	KMC American LL	(Germany) Ramstein AB	Group Stage	1–2
2011	Rotterdam LL	(Netherlands) Rotterdam	Round 1	0–3
2012	KMC American LL	(Germany) Ramstein AB	Round 1	0–3

== Europe and Africa Region (2013–) ==
As noted above, the Europe Region was expanded to include Africa in 2013. Results are as of the 2025 Little League World Series.

=== Europe-Africa Qualifier ===
Starting in 2018, a qualification tournament was added into the Europe and Africa regional tournament as a way of expanding for other countries and teams to be involved. Ten teams have an automatic bid into the regional tournament based on participation and enrollment figures. Additional countries wishing to enter the tournament are placed into the qualifier tournament. The format of the qualifier tournament is a round robin with four teams advancing to an elimination round where the two semifinal winners advanced to the double-elimination regional tournament, although a different format was used in 2023 where four participants in the qualification tournament advanced to the regional tournament.

Year	Teams	Final 4	Semifinalists (Advanced to Regional)	Qualifier Tournament Champions
2018	Austria; Belarus; Croatia; Hungary; Poland; Switzerland	1 Austria; 2 Hungary; 3 Belarus; 4 Croatia	Austria; Belarus	Championship was canceled due to inclement weather.
2019	Belgium; Croatia; Hungary; Poland; Switzerland	1 (Croatia) Croatia; 2 (Switzerland) Switzerland; 3 (Belgium) Belgium; 4 Hungary	Croatia; Belgium	Croatia
2023	Pool A France; Poland; Switzerland; Kyiv, Ukraine Pool B Germany; Israel; Lithuania; Mykolaiv, Ukraine	Advanced to Regional Kyiv, Ukraine; Germany; France; Switzerland	No semifinal games held	No champion designated
2024	Croatia; Estonia; Israel; Lithuania; Gdańsk, Poland; Wrocław, Poland; Ukraine	1 (Israel) Israel; 2 (Croatia) Croatia; 3 (Lithuania) Lithuania; 4 Estonia	Israel; Lithuania	Israel
2025	Belgium (Croatia) Croatia; Poland (Romania) Romania; Slovakia; Switzerland; Ukraine	1 Croatia; 2 Slovakia; 3 Belgium; 4 Romania	Croatia; Belgium	Croatia
2026	Austria; Lithuania; Poland; Slovakia; Switzerland; Ukraine	No playoffs held	Advanced to Regional Lithuania; Switzerland	No championship held

=== Regional Championships ===
Below are the champions of the Europe and Africa, along with participants for each year. The year's winner is indicated in green. A Dash, "-", indicates country had no participant that year.

Year	Austria	Belarus	Belgium	Croatia	Czech Republic	France	Germany	Hungary	Israel	Italy	Lithuania	Moldova	Netherlands	Poland	Romania	Serbia	South Africa	Spain	Switzerland	Uganda	United Kingdom	Ukraine
2013	East Austria LL; Vienna	Sugar Storm LL; Skidel	-	-	South Moravia LL; Brno	Haute Normandie LL; Rouen	KMC American LL; Ramstein	-	-	Emilia LL; Emilia	Vilnius LL; Vilnius	-	Rotterdam LL; Rotterdam	-	-	Serbia LL; Belgrade	-	-	-	-	London Area Youth LL; London	Rivne LL; Rivne
2014	-	Brest Zubrs LL; Brest	Flanders East LL; Antwerp	-	South Moravia LL; Brno	Aquitaine LL; Aquitaine	KMC American LL; Ramstein	-	-	Emilia LL; Emilia	Vilnius LL; Vilnius	Kvint LL; Tiraspol	Kennemerland LL; Haarlem	BUKS; GepardyŻory LL; Żory	-	Serbia LL; Belgrade	-	Catalunya LL; Catalunya	-	-	London Area Youth LL; London	Kirovograd LL; Kirovograd
2015	East Austria LL; Vienna	Brest Zubrs LL; Brest	Brussels LL; Brussels	-	South Moravia LL; Brno	-	KMC American LL; Ramstein	Central LL; Budapest	-	Emilia LL; Emilia	-	Kvint LL; Tiraspol	Rotterdam LL; Rotterdam	Zory/ Jastrzebie/ Rybnik LL; Wodzisław Śląski	-	-	-	Catalunya LL; Barcelona	-	AVRS Secondary School LL; Kampala	London Youth Baseball LL; London	Kirovograd Center LL; Kirovograd
2016	Austria East LL; Vienna	Brest Zubrs LL; Brest	Flanders East LL; Antwerp	Croatia North LL; Zagreb	South Czech Republic LL; Brno	Ile-de-France 2 LL; Paris	KMC American LL; Ramstein	Central/ Eastern LL; Budapest	-	Emilia LL; Emilia	Kaunas LL; Kaunas	-	Kennemerland LL; Haarlem	-	-	-	-	Catalunya LL; Barcelona	-	-	London Youth Baseball LL; London	Kirovograd Center LL; Kirovograd
2017	East Austria LL; Vienna	Sugar Storm LL; Skidel	Flanders West LL; Hasselt	Croatia North LL; Zagreb	South Czech Republic LL; Brno	-	KMC American LL; Ramstein	Central/ Eastern LL; Budapest	-	Emilia LL; Emilia	-	-	Den Haag LL; The Hague	Zory/ Rybnik/ Jastrzebie LL; Wodzisław Śląski	CSS Calarasi LL; Călărași	-	-	Catalunya LL; Barcelona	-	-	London Youth Baseball LL; London	Rivne LL; Rivne
2018	East Austria LL; Vienna	Sugar Storm LL; Skidel	Brussels LL; Brussels	-	Northwest Czech Republic LL; Prague	Ile-De-France LL; Paris	KMC American LL; Ramstein	-	-	Friuli-Venezia Giulia LL; Ronchi dei Legionari	Vilnius LL; Vilnius	-	Kennemerland LL; Haarlem	-	-	-	-	Catalunya LL; Barcelona	-	-	London LL; London	Kirovograd Center LL; Kirovograd
2019	Austria East LL; Vienna	Sugar Storm LL; Skidel	Brussels LL; Brussels	Croatia North LL; Karlovac	South Czech Republic LL; Brno	Ile-De-France LL; Paris	KMC American LL; Ramstein	Central LL; Budapest	-	Emilia Romagna LL; Bologna	Kaunas LL; Kaunas	-	Amsterdam LL; Amsterdam	Kedzierzy Kozle LL; Kędzierzyn-Koźle	-	-	-	Catalunya LL; Barcelona	-	-	South/East London LL; London	Kyiv Baseball School LL; Kyiv
2022	East Austria LL; Vienna	-	-	Croatia North LL; Sisak	South Czech Republic LL; Brno	-	-	-	-	Emilia Romagna LL; Bologna	-	-	Kennemerland LL; Haarlem	-	-	-	-	Catalunya LL; Barcelona	Switzerland East/West LL; Basel	-	London LL; London	Odesa/Mykolaiv/Kyiv LL; Odesa/Mykolaiv/Kyiv
2023	East Austria LL; Vienna	-	-	Croatia North LL; Sisak	South Czech Republic LL; Brno	SUD LL; Nice	South-East Germany LL; Munich	-	-	Veneto LL; Verona	-	-	Midden-Nederland LL; Utrecht	-	-	-	-	Catalunya LL; Barcelona	Switzerland East/West LL; Basel	-	London LL; London	Kyiv Baseball School LL; Kyiv
2024	East Austria LL; Vienna	-	-	-	South Czech Republic LL; Brno	Sud LL; Nice	South-East Germany LL; Munich	-	South/Center LL; Beit Shemesh	Emilia Romagna LL; Bologna	Vilnius LL; Vilnius	-	Rotterdam LL; Rotterdam	-	-	-	Western Cape Baseball LL; Cape Town	Madrid LL; Madrid	Switzerland West/East LL; Zurich	-	London LL; London	Kyiv Baseball School/Rivne LL; Kyiv/Rivne
2025	-	-	Belgium Region 3 LL; Antwerp	Croatia North LL; Sisak	South Czech Republic LL; Brno	Ile-De-France LL; Paris	South-West Germany LL; Mannheim	-	South LL; Beit Shemesh	Toscana LL; Florence	Vilnius LL; Vilnius	-	Rotterdam LL; Rotterdam	-	-	-	-	Madrid LL; Madrid	-	-	London LL; London	Kyiv Baseball School LL; Kyiv
2026	-	-	Belgium Region 3 LL; Antwerp	Croatia North LL; Sisak	South Czech Republic LL; Brno	-	South-West Germany LL; Mannheim	-	-	Veneto LL; Verona	Central Lithuania LL; Kaunas	-	Rotterdam LL; Rotterdam	-	-	-	-	Catalunya LL; Barcelona	Switzerland West LL; Therwil	-	London LL; London	Kyiv Baseball School LL; Kyiv

=== LLWS Performance ===
Year	Champion	City	LLWS	Record
2013	South Moravia LL	(Czech Republic) Brno	Round 1	1–2
2014	South Moravia LL	(Czech Republic) Brno	Round 1	0–3
2015	AVRS Secondary School LL	(Uganda) Kampala	Round 2	1–2
2016	Emilia LL	(Italy) Emilia	Round 1	0–3
2017	Emilia LL	(Italy) Emilia	Round 1	0–3
2018	Catalunya LL	(Spain) Barcelona	Round 1	0–3
2019	Emilia Romagna LL	(Italy) Bologna	Round 1	0–3
2020	Cancelled due to COVID-19 pandemic			
2021	No international participant			
2022	Emilia Romagna LL	(Italy) Bologna	Round 2	1–2
2023	South Czech Republic LL	(Czech Republic) Brno	Round 1	0–2
2024	South Czech Republic LL	(Czech Republic) Brno	Round 1	0–2
2025	South Czech Republic LL	(Czech Republic) Brno	Round 1	0–2
2026	South Czech Republic LL	(Czech Republic) Brno	Round 2	0–2

== By country ==
Table includes results from Europe, EMEA, Transatlantic and Europe and Africa regions through the 2026 Little League World Series. Italics indicates team is no longer either a part of the European region or the African region that participate in the joint regional championship.

Country	European/Regional Championships	LLWS Championships	Record in LLWS	PCT
Saudi Arabia	19	0	18–39	.316
West Germany/Germany	16	0	8–40	.167
Spain	10	0	3–26	.103
Italy	6	0	2–16	.111
Czech Republic	6	0	1–13	.071
Russia	5	0	1–14	.067
Belgium	2	0	1–5	.167
Netherlands	2	0	0–6	.000
France	1	0	1–2	.333
Uganda	1	0	1–2	.333
Turkey	1	0	0–2	.000
Greece	1	0	0–3	.000
Poland	1	0	0–3	.000
Total	71	0	36–171	.174

== See also ==
- Baseball awards § World
- Baseball awards § Europe

Europe–Africa Region in other Little League divisions

- Intermediate League
- Junior League
- Senior League
- Big League
