= Jeff Cross =

Jeff Cross may refer to:

- Jeff Cross (American football) (born 1966), former professional football player in the NFL
- Jeff Cross (baseball) (1918–1997), professional baseball player in MLB
- Jeff Cross (basketball) (born 1961), former professional basketball player in the NBA
- Jeff Cross (1923–2016), inductee of the Canadian Soccer Hall of Fame

== See also ==
- Geoffrey Cross, Baron Cross of Chelsea, British judge
- Jeffrey Cross, aka OG Loc, a character in Grand Theft Auto: San Andreas
