= 1956 Little League World Series =

Children's baseball tournament

Tournament details
- Dates: August 21–August 24
- Teams: 8

Final positions
- Champions: Lions Hondo Little League; Roswell, New Mexico
- Runners-up: Delaware Township Little League; Delaware Township, New Jersey

The 1956 Little League World Series was held from August 21 to August 24 in Williamsport, Pennsylvania. The Lions Hondo Little League of Roswell, New Mexico, defeated the Delaware Township Little League of Delaware Township, New Jersey, in the championship game of the 10th Little League World Series. Delaware Township had also been runner-up in the 1955 tournament. This was the first, and to date only, time that a team from New Mexico appeared in the championship game.

In a semi-final game on August 23, Fred Shapiro of the Delaware Township team pitched the first perfect game in Little League World Series history.

== Teams ==
States represented at the 1956 Little League World Series

Region 1	Winchester, Massachusetts
Region 2	(New York (state)) Tuckahoe, New York
Region 3	Upper Darby Township, Pennsylvania
Region 4	Delaware Township, New Jersey†
Region 5	Auburn, Alabama
Region 6	Hamtramck, Michigan
Region 7	Roswell, New Mexico
Region 8	Colton, California

† Delaware Township was renamed Cherry Hill in November 1961

== Bracket ==
Quarter-finals
August 21
New Jersey	9
(New York (state)) New York	8
August 22 (F/8)
California	1
Michigan	0
August 22
Massachusetts	8
Alabama	0
August 22
New Mexico	3
Pennsylvania	1

Semi-finals
August 23
New Jersey	2
California	0
August 23
New Mexico	6
Massachusetts	3

Final
August 24
New Jersey	1
New Mexico	3
Third place
August 24
California	1
Massachusetts	2

1956 Little League World Series Champions
Lions Hondo Little League
Roswell, New Mexico

== Notable players ==
- Tom Jordan Jr., winning pitcher for New Mexico in the championship game, was the son of former MLB player Tom Jordan.
