= 1951 Little League World Series =

Children's baseball tournament

Tournament details
- Dates: August 21–August 25
- Teams: 8

Final positions
- Champions: Stamford, Connecticut
- Runners-up: Austin, Texas

The 1951 Little League World Series was held from August 21 to August 25 in Williamsport, Pennsylvania. The Stamford Little League of Stamford, Connecticut, defeated the Austin Little League of Austin, Texas, in the championship game of the 5th Little League World Series.

Attendees at the championship game included Baseball Hall of Fame inductee Cy Young, and Notre Dame football head coach Frank Leahy.

== Teams ==
States represented at the 1951 Little League World Series

Region 1	Portland, Maine
Region 2	Stamford, Connecticut
Region 3	Potter-McKean, Pennsylvania
Region 4	Fairmont, West Virginia
Region 5	Pensacola, Florida
Region 6	Chicago, Illinois
Region 7	Austin, Texas
Region 8	San Bernardino, California

== Championship bracket ==
Quarter-finals
August 21
Connecticut	4
Pennsylvania	2
August 21
West Virginia	5
Florida	4
August 22
Texas	3
Maine	1
August 22
California	5
Illinois	1

Semi-finals
August 23
Connecticut	11
West Virginia	0
August 23
Texas	9
California	0

Final
August 25
Connecticut	3
Texas	0
Third place
August 24
West Virginia	5
California	4
