= 1968 Little League World Series =

Children's baseball tournament

Tournament details
- Dates: August 18–August 23
- Teams: 8

Final positions
- Champions: Wakayama Little League; Osaka, Japan
- Runner-up: (United States) Tuckahoe Little League; Richmond, Virginia

The 1968 Little League World Series took place between August 20 and August 24 in South Williamsport, Pennsylvania. The Wakayama Little League of Osaka, Japan, defeated the Tuckahoe Little League of Richmond, Virginia, in the championship game of the 22nd Little League World Series.

== Teams ==
United States	International
Terre Haute, Indiana; North Region; American Little League	Sherbrooke, Quebec, Canada; Canada Region; Sherbrooke-Lennoxville Little League
Hagerstown, Maryland; East Region; National Little League	Wiesbaden, Hesse, West Germany; Europe Region; Wiesbaden Little League
Richmond, Virginia; South Region; Tuckahoe Little League	Osaka, Japan; Far East Region; Wakayama Little League
Garden Grove, California; West Region; Bolsa Little League	Chinandega, Nicaragua; Latin America Region; Chinendaga Little League

== Championship bracket ==
Quarter-finals
August 18
Canada	1
Nicaragua	0
August 18
Virginia	6
Indiana	2
August 19
California	3
Maryland	0
August 19
West Germany	2
Japan	14

Semi-finals
August 22
Canada	5
Virginia	8
August 22
California	0
Japan	3

Final
August 24
Virginia	0
Japan	1
Third place
August 23
Canada	0
California	1

== Consolation bracket ==
Games A & B
August 19
Nicaragua	0
Indiana	1
August 20
Maryland	2
West Germany	0

Game D
August 21
Indiana	1
Maryland	0
Game C
August 22
Nicaragua	3
West Germany	1

1968 Little League World Series Champions
Wakayama Little League
Osaka, Japan

== Notable players ==
- Jim Pankovits of Richmond went on to play in MLB as an infielder between 1984 and 1990
- Turk Schonert of Garden Grove went on to play in the NFL as a quarterback between 1981 and 1989
