= 1983 Little League World Series =

Children's baseball tournament

Tournament details
- Dates: August 23–August 27
- Teams: 8

Final positions
- Champions: (United States) (Georgia (U.S. state)) East Marietta National Little League; Marietta, Georgia
- Runners-up: Liquito Hernandez Little League; Barahona, Dominican Republic

The 1983 Little League World Series took place between August 23 and August 27 in South Williamsport, Pennsylvania. The East Marietta National Little League of Marietta, Georgia, defeated the Liquito Hernandez Little League of Barahona, Dominican Republic, in the championship game of the 37th Little League World Series.

The championship game did not feature a team from Taiwan for the first time since 1976. Their six consecutive finals appearances remain a record by one country or U.S. state.

== Teams ==
| United States | International |
|---|---|
| (Illinois) Chicago, Illinois; Central Region; Jackie Robinson West Little League | Sherbrooke, Quebec, Canada; Canada Region; Fleurimont Little League |
| (Connecticut) Stamford, Connecticut; East Region; American Little League | (Saudi Arabia) Al Khobar, Saudi Arabia; Europe Region; Persian Gulf Little League |
| (Georgia (U.S. state)) Marietta, Georgia; South Region; East Marietta National Little League | (Japan) (Osaka Prefecture) Osaka, Japan; Far East Region; Osaka Yodogawa Little League |
| (California) Sacramento, California; West Region; Pacific Little League | (Dominican Republic) Barahona, Dominican Republic; Latin America Region; Liquito Hernandez Little League |

== Championship bracket ==
Quarter-finals
August 23
Illinois | 2
(Georgia (U.S. state)) Georgia | 7
August 24
Connecticut | 8
California | 2
August 23
Japan | 1
Saudi Arabia | 0
August 24
Dominican Republic | 8
Canada | 2

Semi-finals
August 25
Connecticut | 8
(Georgia (U.S. state)) Georgia | 9
August 25
Japan | 0
Dominican Republic | 3

Final
August 27
(Georgia (U.S. state)) Georgia | 3
Dominican Republic | 1
Third place
August 26
Connecticut | 3
Japan | 11

== Position bracket ==
Games A & B
August 24
Saudi Arabia | 0
Illinois | 15
August 25
Canada | 0
California | 10

Game D
August 26
California | 0
Illinois | 5
Game C
August 26
Canada | 0
Saudi Arabia | 2

1983 Little League World Series Champions
East Marietta National Little League
Marietta, Georgia

== Champions path ==
The East Marietta National LL had an undefeated record of 11–0 to reach the LLWS. In total, their record was 14–0.

| Round | Opposition | Result |
Georgia State Tournament
| Opening Round | (Georgia (U.S. state)) Moreland-Grantville LL | 10–0 |
| Winner's Bracket Semifinals | (Georgia (U.S. state)) Belvedere LL | 5–1 |
| Winner's Bracket Finals | (Georgia (U.S. state)) Murphey Candler National LL | 3–0 |
| Championship | (Georgia (U.S. state)) Warner Robins American LL | 11–7 |
Southern Regional
| Opening Round | (Tennessee) Bellevue Western American LL | 6–0 |
| Quarterfinals | (Mississippi) Continental LL | 10–0 |
| Semifinals | (North Carolina) Lenoir LL | 17–3 |
| Southern Region Championship | (Virginia) Vienna American LL | 5–4 |

== Notable players ==
- Marc Pisciotta (Marietta, Georgia) – MLB pitcher from 1997 to 1999
