= 1950 Little League World Series =

Children's baseball tournament

Tournament details
- Dates: August 23–August 26
- Teams: 8

Final positions
- Champions: Houston, Texas
- Runners-up: Bridgeport, Connecticut

The 1950 Little League World Series was held from August 23 to August 26 in Williamsport, Pennsylvania. The Houston Little League of Houston, Texas, defeated Bridgeport Little League of Bridgeport, Connecticut, in the championship game of the 4th Little League World Series.

Attendees at the championship game included James H. Duff, Governor of Pennsylvania, and Ford Frick, president of the National League (and later Commissioner of Baseball). The Houston Little League team was managed by former MLB player Jeff Cross.

== Teams ==
States represented at the 1950 Little League World Series

Region 1	Westerly, Rhode Island
Region 2	Bridgeport, Connecticut
Region 3	Punxsutawney, Pennsylvania
Region 4	Hagerstown, Maryland
Region 5	Clinton, South Carolina
Region 6	Pensacola, Florida
Region 7	Kankakee, Illinois
Region 8	Houston, Texas

== Bracket ==
Quarter-finals
August 23
Maryland	4
Pennsylvania	2
August 24
Connecticut	3
South Carolina	2
August 24
Illinois	2
Florida	1
August 24
Texas	3
Rhode Island	1

Semi-finals
August 25
Maryland	2
Connecticut	6
August 25
Illinois	0
Texas	3

Final
August 26
Connecticut	1
Texas	2
Third place
August 26
Maryland	0
Illinois	1
