= 1948 Little League World Series =

Children's baseball tournament

Tournament details
- Dates: August 25–August 28
- Teams: 8

Final positions
- Champions: Lock Haven, Pennsylvania
- Runners-up: St. Petersburg, Florida

The 1948 Little League World Series was held from August 25 to August 28 in Williamsport, Pennsylvania. The Lock Haven All Stars of Lock Haven, Pennsylvania, defeated the St. Petersburg All Stars of St. Petersburg, Florida, in the second championship game of Little League Baseball. The event was referred to as the National Little League Tournament, as "World Series" naming was not adopted until the following year.

== Teams ==
States represented at the 1948 Little League World Series

Middletown, Connecticut
St. Petersburg, Florida
Hammonton, New Jersey
(New York (state)) Corning, New York
Lock Haven, Pennsylvania
West Shore, Pennsylvania
Williamsport, Pennsylvania
Alexandria, Virginia

== Bracket ==
Quarter-finals
August 25
(Pennsylvania) Williamsport	8
(Pennsylvania) West Shore	3
August 26
(Pennsylvania) Lock Haven	12
(Virginia) Alexandria	1
August 26
(New Jersey) Hammonton	13
(New York (state)) Corning	1
August 26
(Florida) St. Petersburg	8
(Connecticut) Middletown	0

Semi-finals
August 27
(Pennsylvania) Williamsport	0
(Pennsylvania) Lock Haven	1
August 27
(New Jersey) Hammonton	1
(Florida) St. Petersburg	6

Final
August 28
(Pennsylvania) Lock Haven	6
(Florida) St. Petersburg	5
Third place
August 28
(Pennsylvania) Williamsport	10
(New Jersey) Hammonton	1
