= 1969 Little League World Series =

Children's baseball tournament

Tournament details
- Dates: August 18–August 23
- Teams: 8

Final positions
- Champions: Taichung Little League; Taichung City, Taiwan
- Runners-up: (United States) Briarwood Little League; Santa Clara, California

The 1969 Little League World Series took place between August 18 and August 23 in South Williamsport, Pennsylvania. The Taichung Little League of Taichung City, Taiwan, defeated the Briarwood Little League of Santa Clara, California, in the championship game of the 23rd Little League World Series. This was the first Little League championship won by a team from Taiwan.

== Teams ==
United States	International
(Ohio) Elyria, Ohio; North Region; West Little League	Valleyfield, Quebec (Canada) Canada; Valleyfield Little League
(Pennsylvania) Williamsport, Pennsylvania; East Region; Newberry Little League	(Germany) Wiesbaden, Germany; Europe; Wiesbaden Little League
(Florida) Tampa, Florida; South Region; West Tampa Little League	(Taiwan) Taichung City, Taiwan; Far East; Taichung Little League
(California) Santa Clara, California; West Region; Briarwood Little League	(Puerto Rico) Mayagüez, Puerto Rico; Latin America; Jorge Rosas Little League

== Championship bracket ==
Quarter-finals
August 18
Pennsylvania	0
California	2
August 18
Florida	2
Germany	1
August 19
Puerto Rico	2
Ohio	5
August 19 (F/12)
Taiwan	5
Canada	0

Semi-finals
August 20
California	4
Florida	3
August 21
Ohio	3
Taiwan	4

Final
August 23
California	0
Taiwan	5
Third place
August 22
Florida	1
Ohio	1

== Consolation bracket ==
Games A & B
August 19
Pennsylvania	4
Germany	1
August 20
Puerto Rico	13
Canada	0

Game D
August 21
Pennsylvania	2
Puerto Rico	1
Game C
August 22
Germany	1
Canada	3

1969 Little League World Series Champions
Taichung Little League
Taichung City, Taiwan

== Notable players ==
- Carney Lansford of the Santa Clara team went on to play in MLB as a third baseman from 1978 through 1992

== See also ==
- Taitung Red Leaves
