= 1977 Little League World Series =

Children's baseball tournament

Tournament details
- Dates: August 23–August 27
- Teams: 8

Final positions
- Champions: Li-Teh Little League; Kaohsiung, Taiwan
- Runners-up: (United States) Western Little League; El Cajon, California

The 1977 Little League World Series took place between August 23 and August 27 in South Williamsport, Pennsylvania. The Li-Teh Little League of Kaohsiung, Taiwan, defeated the Western Little League of El Cajon, California, in the championship game of the 31st Little League World Series.

== Teams ==
United States	International
(Ohio) Youngstown, Ohio; Central Region; Midget Boosters Little League	Lethbridge, Alberta; Canada Region; Norcrest Little League
(New York (state)) Rotterdam, New York; East Region; Carman Little League	(Spain) Madrid, Spain; Europe Region; Torrejon Air Base Little League
(Mississippi) Hattiesburg, Mississippi; South Region; Hub City Little League	(Taiwan) Kaohsiung, Taiwan; Far East Region; Li-Teh Little League
(California) El Cajon, California; West Region; Western Little League	(Venezuela) Maracaibo, Venezuela; Latin America Region; Coquivacoa Little League

== Championship bracket ==
Quarter-finals
August 23
Venezuela	8
Spain	6
August 24
Taiwan	19
Canada	0
August 23
Mississippi	1
California	3
August 24
Ohio	1
(New York (state)) New York	4

Semi-finals
August 25
Venezuela	2
Taiwan	9
August 25
California	6
(New York (state)) New York	3

Final
August 27
California	2
Taiwan	7
Third place
August 26
(New York (state)) New York	5
Venezuela	3

== Consolation bracket ==
Games A & B
August 23
Spain	2
Mississippi	10
August 24
Ohio	5
Canada	4

Game D
August 25
Mississippi	9
Ohio	2
Game C
August 25
Spain	6
Canada	4

1977 Little League World Series Champions
Li-Teh Little League
Kaohsiung, Taiwan

== Notable players ==
- Charlie Hayes of the Hattiesburg, Mississippi, team went on to play in MLB as a third baseman from 1988 to 2001.
