= 1988 Little League World Series =

Amateur baseball competition

Tournament details
- Dates: August 23–August 27
- Teams: 8

Final positions
- Champions: Taiping Little League; Taichung, Taiwan
- Runners-up: (United States) Pearl City Little League; Pearl City, Hawaii

The 1988 Little League World Series took place between August 23 and August 27 in South Williamsport, Pennsylvania. The Taiping Little League of Taichung, Taiwan, defeated the Pearl City Little League of Pearl City, Hawaii, in the championship game of the 42nd Little League World Series.

== Teams ==
United States	International
(Oklahoma) Tulsa, Oklahoma; Central Region; Tulsa Little League	Glace Bay, Nova Scotia; Canada Region; Glace Bay Little League
(Massachusetts) Andover, Massachusetts; East Region; National Little League	(Saudi Arabia) Dhahran, Saudi Arabia; Europe Region; Aramco Little League
(Texas) Spring, Texas; South Region; Northwest 45 Little League	Taichung, Taiwan (Chinese Taipei); Far East Region; Taiping Little League
(Hawaii) Pearl City, Hawaii; West Region; Pearl City Little League	(Panama) Curundu, Panama; Latin America Region; Curundu Little League

- Taiwan participates under the name Chinese Taipei in many sporting events, including Little League Baseball (LLB).

== Championship bracket ==
Quarter-finals
August 23
Panama	4
Taiwan	5
August 24
Canada	5
Saudi Arabia	1
August 23
Texas	8
Massachusetts	6
August 24
Oklahoma	2
Hawaii	3

Semi-finals
August 25
Taiwan	16
Canada	1
August 25
Texas	4
Hawaii	5

Final
August 27
Taiwan	10
Hawaii	0
Third place
August 26
Canada	2
Texas	3

== Position bracket ==
Games A & B
August 24
Panama	1
Massachusetts	2
August 25
Oklahoma	0
Saudi Arabia	12

Game D
August 26
Massachusetts	1
Saudi Arabia	2
Game C
August 26
Panama	7
Oklahoma	0

1988 Little League World Series Champions
Taiping Little League
Taichung, Taiwan
