= 1953 Little League World Series =

Children's baseball tournament

Tournament details
- Dates: August 25–August 28
- Teams: 8

Final positions
- Champions: Birmingham, Alabama
- Runners-up: (New York (state)) Schenectady, New York

The 1953 Little League World Series was held from August 25 to August 28 in Williamsport, Pennsylvania. In the championship game, Birmingham, Alabama, beat Schenectady, New York, by a score of 1–0 in the seventh edition of the Little League World Series.

The Birmingham Public Library commemorated the 50th anniversary of the championship in 2003.

== Teams ==
States and provinces represented at the 1953 Little League World Series

Region 1	(New York (state)) Schenectady, New York
Region 2	North Newton, Massachusetts
Region 3	Camp Hill, Pennsylvania
Region 4	Front Royal, Virginia
Region 5	Birmingham, Alabama
Region 6	Joliet, Illinois
Region 7	Little Rock, Arkansas
Region 8	Vancouver, British Columbia, Canada

== Results ==
Quarter-finals
August 25
Massachusetts	2
(New York (state)) New York	3
August 25
Pennsylvania	17
Arkansas	3
August 26
British Columbia	2
Virginia	3
August 26
Illinois	1
Alabama	6

Semi-finals
August 27
(New York (state)) New York	10
Pennsylvania	9
August 27
Virginia	2
Alabama	10

Final
August 28
(New York (state)) New York	0
Alabama	1
Third place
August 28
Pennsylvania	0
Virginia	3

== Notable players ==
- Jim Barbieri of Schenectady would return in 1954 as a member of that year's championship team, and would later play in Major League Baseball.
