= 1967 Little League World Series =

Children's baseball tournament

Tournament details
- Dates: August 22–August 26
- Teams: 8

Final positions
- Champions: West Tokyo Little League; West Tokyo, Japan
- Runners-up: (United States) North Roseland Little League; Chicago, Illinois

The 1967 Little League World Series took place between August 22 and August 26 in South Williamsport, Pennsylvania. The West Tokyo Little League of West Tokyo, Japan, defeated the North Roseland Little League of Chicago, Illinois, in the championship game of the 21st Little League World Series. This was the first time the Little League championship was won by a team from outside the Americas, as all prior titles had been won by teams from the United States and Mexico.

== Teams ==
United States	International
(Illinois) Chicago, Illinois; North Region; North Roseland Little League	Trail, British Columbia; Canada Region; East Trail Little League
(Pennsylvania) Newtown Square, Pennsylvania; East Region; Newtown-Edgemont Little League	(Spain) Rota, Spain; Europe Region; Rota Little League
(Florida) Tampa, Florida; South Region; West Tampa Little League	(Japan) West Tokyo, Japan; Far East Region; West Tokyo Little League
(California) Northridge, California; West Region; Northridge City Little League	(Mexico) Linares, Nuevo León, Mexico; Latin America Region; Linares Little League

== Winners bracket ==
Quarter-finals
August 20
Japan	1
Canada	0
August 20
Florida	1
Pennsylvania	3
August 21
Illinois	1
Spain	0
August 21
Mexico	1
California	0

Semi-finals
August 24
Japan	4
Pennsylvania	1
August 24 (F/8)
Illinois	8
Mexico	3

Final
August 26
Japan	4
Illinois	1
Third place
August 25
Pennsylvania	2
Mexico	1

== Consolation bracket ==
Games A & B
August 21
Canada	2
Florida	4
August 22
Spain	2
California	3

Game D
August 23
Florida	rain
California	out
Game C
August 24
Canada	rain
Spain	out

Both Games C and D were cancelled

1967 Little League World Series Champions
West Tokyo Little League
West Tokyo, Japan

== Notable players ==
- Bobby Mitchell of Northridge went on to play in MLB as an outfielder from 1980 to 1983
