= 1955 Little League World Series =

Children's baseball tournament

Tournament details
- Dates: August 23–August 26
- Teams: 8

Final positions
- Champions: Morrisville Little League; Morrisville, Pennsylvania
- Runners-up: Delaware Township Little League; Delaware Township, New Jersey

The 1955 Little League World Series was held from August 23 to August 26 in Williamsport, Pennsylvania. Morrisville Little League of Morrisville, Pennsylvania, defeated Delaware Township Little League of Delaware Township, New Jersey, in the championship game of the 9th Little League World Series.

This was the first time that the Little League World Series title was won with a walk-off home run, hit by Rich Cominski in the bottom of the 7th inning. Attendees at the final game included former General of the Army George Marshall and Governor of Pennsylvania George M. Leader.

An all-black team from Charleston, South Carolina, which had won its state and regional tournaments by forfeit when their all-white opponents refused to play against them, was ruled ineligible to play in the tournament but invited by Little League to attend the event as guests.

== Teams ==
States represented at the 1955 Little League World Series

Region 1	Winchester, Massachusetts
Region 2	(New York (state)) Glens Falls, New York
Region 3	Morrisville, Pennsylvania
Region 4	Delaware Township, New Jersey†
Region 5	Auburn, Alabama
Region 6	Hamtramck, Michigan
Region 7	Alexandria, Louisiana
Region 8	San Diego, California

†Delaware Township was renamed Cherry Hill in November 1961

== Championship bracket ==
Quarter-finals
August 23
Massachusetts	8
Michigan	5
August 23
Pennsylvania	4
(New York (state)) New York	3
August 24
New Jersey	4
Louisiana	2
August 24
Alabama	4
California	1

Semi-finals
August 25 (F/8)
Massachusetts	0
Pennsylvania	3
August 25
New Jersey	6
Alabama	4

Final
August 26 (F/7)
Pennsylvania	4
New Jersey	3
Third place
August 26 (F/7)
Massachusetts	0
Alabama	1

1955 Little League World Series Champions
Morrisville Little League
Morrisville, Pennsylvania

== Notable players ==
- Billy Hunter of Delaware Township went on to play in the National Football League, and later served as executive director of the National Basketball Players Association; he was inducted to the Little League Hall of Excellence in 2000.
- Dick Hart of Morrisville played in the NFL for the Philadelphia Eagles and Buffalo Bills.
