= 1964 Little League World Series =

Children's baseball tournament

Tournament details
- Dates: August 25–August 29
- Teams: 8

Final positions
- Champions: (United States) (New York (state)) Mid-Island Little League; Staten Island, New York
- Runners-up: (Mexico) Obispado Little League; Monterrey, Nuevo León

The 1964 Little League World Series took place between August 25 and August 29 in South Williamsport, Pennsylvania. Mid-Island Little League of Staten Island, New York, defeated Obispado Little League of Monterrey, Nuevo León, Mexico, in the championship game of the 18th Little League World Series.

== Teams ==
United States	International
(Oklahoma) Bartlesville, Oklahoma; North Region; National Little League	Valleyfield, Quebec; Canada Region; Rotary Little League
(New York (state)) Staten Island, New York; East Region; Mid-Island Little League	(Germany) Wiesbaden, Germany; Europe Region; Wiesbaden Little League
(Alabama) Mobile, Alabama; South Region; South Brookley Little League	(Japan) Tokyo, Japan; Far East Region; Tachikawa City Little League
(California) La Puente, California; West Region; National Little League	(Mexico) Monterrey, Nuevo León, Mexico; Latin America Region; Obispado Little League

== Championship bracket ==
Quarter-finals
Oklahoma	2
Mexico	7
Alabama	6
California	2
Germany	1
(New York (state)) New York	8
Canada	0
Japan	1

Semi-finals
Mexico	4
Alabama	3
(New York (state)) New York	3
Japan	1

Final
Mexico	0
(New York (state)) New York	4
Third place
Alabama	3
Japan	2

== Consolation bracket ==
Games A & B
Oklahoma	3
California	1
Germany	1
Canada	9

Game D
Oklahoma	6
Canada	4
Game C
California	7
Germany	0

1964 Little League World Series Champions
Mid-Island Little League
Staten Island, New York
