= 1965 Little League World Series =

Children's baseball tournament

Tournament details
- Dates: August 24–August 28
- Teams: 8

Final positions
- Champions: Windsor Locks Little League; Windsor Locks, Connecticut
- Runners-up: Stoney Creek Little League; Stoney Creek, Ontario

The 1965 Little League World Series took place from August 24 through August 28 in South Williamsport, Pennsylvania. Windsor Locks Little League of Windsor Locks, Connecticut, defeated Stoney Creek Little League of Stoney Creek, Ontario, in the championship game of the 19th Little League World Series. This was the first, and to date only, appearance by a Canadian team in the championship game.

== Teams ==
United States	International
Jeffersonville, Indiana; North Region; George Rogers Clark Little League	(Ontario) Stoney Creek, Ontario; Canada Region; Stoney Creek Little League
Windsor Locks, Connecticut; East Region; Windsor Locks Little League	Rota, Spain; Europe Region; Rota Little League
Waco, Texas; South Region; North Waco Little League	Tokyo, Japan; Far East Region; Arakawa Little League
Phoenix, Arizona; West Region; South Mountain Little League	Maracaibo, Venezuela; Latin America Region; Zulia Little League

== Winners bracket ==
Quarter-finals
August 24
Venezuela	3
Connecticut	5
August 24
Arizona	1
Texas	7
August 25
Japan	0
Indiana	18
August 25
Spain	0
Canada	6

Semi-finals
August 26
Connecticut	1
Texas	0
August 26
Indiana	0
Canada	1

Final
August 28
Connecticut	3
Canada	1
Third place
August 28
Texas	5
Indiana	1

== Consolation bracket ==
Games A & B
August 25
Venezuela	5
Arizona	2
August 26
Japan	10
Spain	4

Game D
August 27
Venezuela	13
Japan	3
Game C
August 27
Arizona	2
Spain	1

1965 Little League World Series Champions
Windsor Locks Little League
Windsor Locks, Connecticut
