= 1984 Little League World Series =

Children's baseball tournament

Tournament details
- Dates: August 21–August 25
- Teams: 8

Final positions
- Champions: National Little League; Seoul, South Korea
- Runner-up: (United States) National Little League; Altamonte Springs, Florida

The 1984 Little League World Series took place between August 21 and August 25 in South Williamsport, Pennsylvania. The National Little League of Seoul, South Korea, defeated the National Little League of Altamonte Springs, Florida, in the championship game of the 38th Little League World Series.

== Teams ==
United States	International
(Indiana) Southport, Indiana; Central Region; Southport Little League	Coquitlam, British Columbia; Canada Region; Coquitlam Little League
(Connecticut) Bristol, Connecticut; East Region; McCabe-Waters Little League	(Belgium) Brussels, Belgium; Europe Region; Brussels Sports Association Little League
(Florida) Altamonte Springs, Florida; South Region; National Little League	(South Korea) Seoul, South Korea; Far East Region; National Little League
(California) Los Gatos, California; West Region; Los Gatos Little League	Panama City, Panama; Latin America Region; Willys R. Cook Little League

== Championship bracket ==
Quarter-finals
August 21
Florida	5
California	1
August 22
Connecticut	7
Indiana	9
August 21
Belgium	1
Canada	3
August 22
Panama	3
South Korea	4

Semi-finals
August 23
Florida	8
Indiana	1
August 23
Canada	0
South Korea	19

Final
August 25
Florida	2
South Korea	6
Third place
August 24
Canada	3
Indiana	4

== Position bracket ==
Games A & B
August 22
Belgium	1
(United States) California	10
August 23
(United States) Connecticut	0
Panama	1

Game D
August 24
Panama	5
California	2
Game C
August 24
Connecticut	1
Belgium	3

1984 Little League World Series Champions
Seoul National Little League
Seoul, South Korea

== Notable players ==
- Jason Varitek (Altamonte Springs, Florida) – MLB catcher from 1997 to 2011
