= 1995 Little League World Series =

Children's baseball tournament

Tournament details
- Dates: August 21–26, 1995
- Teams: 8

Final positions
- Champions: Shan-Hua Little League; Tainan, Taiwan
- Runners-up: (United States) Northwest 45 Little League; Spring, Texas

The 1995 Little League World Series took place between August 21 and August 26, 1995 in South Williamsport, Pennsylvania. The Shan-Hua Little League of Tainan, Taiwan, defeated the Northwest 45 Little League of Spring, Texas, in the championship game of the 49th Little League World Series.

== Teams ==
United States	International
(Minnesota) Arden Hills, Minnesota; Central Region; Little Lakes West Little League	Toronto, Ontario; Canada Region; High Park Little League
(New Jersey) Toms River, New Jersey; East Region; American Little League	(Saudi Arabia) Dhahran, Saudi Arabia; Europe Region; Arabian American Little League
(Texas) Spring, Texas; South Region; Northwest 45 Little League	Tainan, Taiwan (Chinese Taipei); Far East Region; Shan-Hua Little League
(California) Yorba Linda, California; West Region; Yorba Hills Little League	(Dominican Republic) Hatillo-San Cristóbal, Dominican Republic; Latin America Region; Eduardo Sosa Little League

- Taiwan participates under the name Chinese Taipei in many sporting events, including Little League Baseball (LLB).

== Pool play ==
United States
Rank	State	Record
1	Texas	2–1
2	California	2–1
3	New Jersey	1–2
4	Minnesota	1–2

International
Rank	Country	Record
1	Taiwan	3–0
2	Dominican Republic	2–1
3	Saudi Arabia	1–2
4	Canada	0–3

Pool	Team 1	Score	Team 2	Score
August 21
INT	Saudi Arabia	5	Canada	4
US	Texas	11	New Jersey	10
INT	Taiwan	5	Dominican Republic	1
US	California	17	Minnesota	5
August 22
INT	Dominican Republic	7	Canada	2
US	New Jersey	11	Minnesota	4
INT	Saudi Arabia	0	Taiwan	12 (F/4)
US	Texas	8	California	2
August 23
INT	Dominican Republic	11 (F/5)	Saudi Arabia	1
US	California	8	New Jersey	3
INT	Canada	2	Taiwan	12 (F/4)
US	Minnesota	12 (F/5)	Texas	1

== Elimination round ==
Semi-finals
August 24 (F/7)
Dominican Republic	0
Taiwan	1
August 24
California	1
Texas	3

Final
August 26 (F/5)
Taiwan	17
Texas	3

1995 Little League World Series Champions
Shan-Hua Little League
Tainan, Taiwan

== Notable players ==
- Jeff Frazier (Toms River, New Jersey) - Former MLB player
