= 1986 Little League World Series =

Amateur baseball competition

Tournament details
- Dates: August 19–August 23
- Teams: 8

Final positions
- Champions: Tainan Park Little League; Tainan Park, Taiwan
- Runners-up: (United States) International Little League; Tucson, Arizona

The 1986 Little League World Series took place between August 19 and August 23 in South Williamsport, Pennsylvania. The Tainan Park Little League of Tainan Park, Taiwan, defeated the International Little League of Tucson, Arizona, in the championship game of the 40th Little League World Series.

== Teams ==
United States	International
(Illinois) Norridge, Illinois; Central Region; Norridge Little League	Valleyfield, Quebec; Canada Region; Valleyfield Little League
(Maryland) Brunswick, Maryland; East Region; Brunswick Little League	(Spain) Madrid, Spain; Europe Region; Torrejon Air Base Little League
(Florida) Sarasota, Florida; South Region; American Little League	Tainan Park, Taiwan (Chinese Taipei); Far East Region; Tainan Park Little League
(Arizona) Tucson, Arizona; West Region; International Little League	(Venezuela) Maracaibo, Venezuela; Latin America Region; Coquivacoa Little League

- Taiwan participates under the name Chinese Taipei in many sporting events, including Little League Baseball (LLB).

== Championship bracket ==
Quarter-finals
August 19
Spain	0
Venezuela	9
August 20
Taiwan	26
Canada	0
August 19
Arizona	6
Illinois	2
August 20
Florida	5
Maryland	0

Semi-finals
August 21 (F/8)
Venezuela	4
Taiwan	11
August 21
Arizona	4
Florida	1

Final
August 23
Taiwan	12
Arizona	0
Third place
August 22 (F/9)
Venezuela	2
Florida	3

== Position bracket ==
Games A & B
August 20
Spain	2
Illinois	15
August 21
Maryland	3
Canada	6

Game D
August 22
Illinois	7
Canada	0
Game C
August 22
Spain	0
Maryland	8

1986 Little League World Series Champions
Tainan Park Little League
Tainan Park, Taiwan
