= 1997 Little League World Series =

Baseball tournament

Tournament details
- Dates: August 18–August 23
- Teams: 8

Final positions
- Champions: Linda Vista Little League; Guadalupe, Nuevo León, Mexico
- Runners-up: (United States) South Mission Viejo Little League; Mission Viejo, California

The 1997 Little League World Series took place between August 18 and August 23 in South Williamsport, Pennsylvania. The Linda Vista Little League of Guadalupe, Nuevo León, Mexico, defeated South Mission Viejo Little League of Mission Viejo, California, in the championship game of the 51st Little League World Series. Mexico secured a dramatic come-from-behind win by staging a four-run rally in the bottom of sixth inning.

== Qualification ==
United States	International
(Indiana) Dyer, Indiana; Central; Dyer Little League	(Canada) (British Columbia) Surrey, British Columbia; Canada; Whalley Little League
(Pennsylvania) Pottsville, Pennsylvania; East; Railway Park Little League	(Saudi Arabia) Dhahran, Saudi Arabia; Europe; Arabian American Little League
(Florida) Bradenton, Florida; South; Manatee G.T. Bray East Little League	(Japan) Yokohama, Japan; Far East; Seya Little League
(California) Mission Viejo, California; West; South Mission Viejo Little League	(Mexico) Guadalupe, Nuevo León; Latin America; Linda Vista Little League

== Pool play ==
United States
Region	Record
West	3–0
South	2–1
East	1–2
Central	0–3

International
Region	Record
Latin America	3–0
Far East	2–1
Europe	1–2
Canada	0–3

August 18

Europe	0–3	Latin America
East	1–0	Central
Far East	5–1	Canada
West	10–6	South

August 19

Europe	5–0	Canada
West	9–0	Central
Latin America	12–0 (4 innings)	Far East
South	5–0 (8 innings)	East

(August 20

Latin America	3–0	Canada
Central	2–8	South
Far East	2–1	Europe
East	0–3	West

== Elimination round ==
Semi-finals
21 August
Yokohama, Japan	0
(Mexico) Guadalupe, Nuevo León	1
21 August (5 innings)
Mission Viejo, California	12
Bradenton, Florida	1

Final
23 August
(Mexico) Guadalupe, Nuevo León	5
(United States) Mission Viejo, California	4

1997 Little League World Series Champions
Linda Vista Little League
Guadalupe, Nuevo León, Mexico

== Notable players ==
- Lastings Milledge (Bradenton, Florida) – outfielder in Major League Baseball and Nippon Professional Baseball
- Kevin Duffy (Bradenton, Florida) - First Base in NCAA and owner of Duffel's Dugout

== See also ==
- Mexico in the Little League World Series
