= 1971 Little League World Series =

Children's baseball tournament

Tournament details
- Dates: August 24–August 28
- Teams: 8

Final positions
- Champions: Tainan Little League; Tainan City, Taiwan
- Runners-up: (United States) Anderson Little League; Gary, Indiana

The 1971 Little League World Series took place between August 24 and August 28 in South Williamsport, Pennsylvania. The Tainan Little League of Tainan City, Taiwan, defeated the Anderson Little League of Gary, Indiana, in the championship game of the 25th Little League World Series.

This was the first championship game that was decided in extra innings, and remains the longest championship game in the event's history, at nine innings.

== Teams ==
United States	International
(Indiana) Gary, Indiana; North Region; Anderson Little League	Brockville, Ontario; Canada Region; Brockville Little League
(Maine) Augusta, Maine; East Region; East Little League	(Spain) Madrid, Spain; Europe Region; Madrid Little League
(Kentucky) Lexington, Kentucky; South Region; Gardenside Little League	(Taiwan) Tainan City, Taiwan; Far East Region; Tainan Little League
(Hawaii) Oahu, Hawaii; West Region; Wahiawa American Little League	(Puerto Rico) Caguas, Puerto Rico; Latin America Region; Caguas-Gillette Little League

== Championship bracket ==
Quarter-finals
August 24
Puerto Rico	0
Taiwan	7
August 24
Canada	2
Hawaii	3
August 25
Maine	0
Spain	5
August 25
Indiana	7
Kentucky	2

Semi-finals
August 26
Taiwan	11
Hawaii	0
August 26
Spain	0
Indiana	7

Final
August 28 (F/9)
Taiwan	12
Indiana	3
Third place
August 27
Hawaii	3
Spain	1

== Consolation bracket ==
Games A & B
August 25
Puerto Rico	5
Canada	2
August 26
Maine	1
Kentucky	0

Game D
August 27
Puerto Rico	4
Maine	0
Game C
August 27
Canada	4
Kentucky	1

1971 Little League World Series Champions
Tainan Little League
Tainan City, Taiwan

== Notable players ==
- Lloyd McClendon of the Gary, Indiana, team went on to play in MLB as an outfielder from 1987 to 1994, and later a career as a coach and manager. He was inducted to the Little League Hall of Excellence in 2006. He went 5 for 5 with 5 home runs during the LLWS while getting walked in all other plate appearances.
- Wu Cheng-wen of the Tainan team was trained as an engineer, elected a 2004 fellow of the Institute of Electrical and Electronics Engineers, and appointed Minister of Taiwan's Science and Technology Council in 2024.

== Political incident ==
The organization World United Formosans for Independence hired a small airplane to display a banner with the slogans “Long live Taiwan independence” (“台湾独立万才”, in Han characters) and “Go Go Taiwan” by flying over the stadium during the final game.
