= 1980 Little League World Series =

Children's baseball tournament

Tournament details
- Dates: August 26–August 30
- Teams: 8

Final positions
- Champions: Longkuang Little League; Hualien, Taiwan
- Runners-up: (United States) Belmont Heights Little League; Tampa, Florida

The 1980 Little League World Series took place between August 26 and August 30 in South Williamsport, Pennsylvania. The Longkuang Little League of Hualien, Taiwan, defeated the Belmont Heights Little League of Tampa, Florida, in the championship game of the 34th Little League World Series.

== Teams ==
United States	International
(Iowa) Des Moines, Iowa; Central Region; Grandview National Little League	Trail, British Columbia; Canada Region; Trail Little League
(Rhode Island) Pawtucket, Rhode Island; East Region; Darlington American Little League	(Spain) Madrid, Spain; Europe Region; Torrejon Air Base Little League
(Florida) Tampa, Florida; South Region; Belmont Heights Little League	(Taiwan) Hualien, Taiwan; Far East Region; Longkuong Little League
(Washington (state)) Kirkland, Washington; West Region; Kirkland National Little League	(Netherlands Antilles) Willemstad, Curaçao, Netherlands Antilles; Latin America Region; Pabao Little League

== Championship bracket ==
Quarter-finals
August 26
(Netherlands Antilles) Curaçao	0
Taiwan	6
August 27
Canada	9
Spain	2
August 26
Florida	20
Rhode Island	3
August 27
(Washington (state)) Washington	5
Iowa	0

Semi-finals
August 28
Taiwan	23
Canada	0
August 28
Florida	16
(Washington (state)) Washington	0

Final
August 30
Taiwan	4
Florida	3
Third place
August 29
Canada	1
(Washington (state)) Washington	2

== Position bracket ==
Games A & B
August 26
(Netherlands Antilles) Curaçao	7
Rhode Island	0
August 27
Iowa	8
Spain	1

Game D
August 28
(Netherlands Antilles) Curaçao	1
Iowa	2
Game C
August 28
Rhode Island	6
Spain	0

1980 Little League World Series Champions
Longkuang Little League
Hualien, Taiwan

== Notable players ==
- Gary Sheffield (Tampa, Florida) – MLB outfielder and third baseman from 1988 to 2009
- Derek Bell (Tampa, Florida) – MLB outfielder from 1991 to 2001
- Ty Griffin (Tampa, Florida) - 1988 Olympic Gold Medalist (Team USA - Baseball)
- Maurice Crum Sr. (Tampa, Florida) - 2 Time NCAA Football Champion (Miami Hurricanes)
