= 1958 Little League World Series =

Children's baseball tournament

Tournament details
- Dates: August 19–August 22
- Teams: 7

Final positions
- Champions: Industrial Little League; Monterrey, Nuevo León, Mexico
- Runners-up: (United States) Jaycee Little League; Kankakee, Illinois

The 1958 Little League World Series took place on August 19 through 22 in Williamsport, Pennsylvania. Industrial Little League of Monterrey, Nuevo León, Mexico, won its second consecutive Little League World Series (LLWS) by defeating the Jaycee Little League of Kankakee, Illinois, in the 12th championship game. The Monterrey, Nuevo León, Mexico team was the first team to win in consecutive years, a feat only matched by Seoul, South Korea (1984/1985) and Long Beach, California (1992/1993).

This was the last LLWS to be played at Original Field in Williamsport. This was the first LLWS to include teams from more than four qualifying regions, and also the first to give automatic berths to teams from Canada, represented by the Valleyfield Little League of Valleyfield, Quebec, and to Latin America, represented by Monterrey.

== Teams ==
States and Provinces represented at the 1958 Little League World Series

United States	International
(Illinois) Kankakee, Illinois; North Region; Jaycee Little League	Valleyfield, Quebec; Canada Region; Valleyfield Little League
(Connecticut) Darien, Connecticut; East Region; Darien Little League	(Mexico) Monterrey, Nuevo León, Mexico; Latin America Region; Industrial Little League
(Alabama) Gadsden, Alabama; South Region; National League of Gadsden	(Hawaii) Honolulu, Hawaii; Pacific Region; Pearl Harbor Little League
(Oregon) Portland, Oregon; West region Rose City Little League	

== Bracket ==
Quarter-finals
August 19
Connecticut	7
Canada	2
August 19
Mexico	11
Hawaii	0
August 19
Illinois	2
Oregon	1
August 19
Alabama
Bye

Semi-finals
August 20
Connecticut	5
Mexico	11
August 20
Illinois	3
Alabama	1

Final
August 22
Mexico	10
Illinois	1
Third place
August 21
Connecticut	0
Alabama	2

1958 Little League World Series Champions
Industrial Little League
Monterrey, Nuevo León

== Champions path ==
Round	Opposition	Result
Mexico Championship
?	Tolteca LL	?
?	Metropolitana LL	?
?	Maya LL	?
Latinoamerican Championship
?	Puerto Rico	15–0
?	Venezuela	2–0

== Notable players ==
- Keith Lampard (Portland, Oregon) - former MLB outfielder - Houston Astros
- Héctor Torres (Monterrey, Mexico) - former MLB SS, 2B, 3B, and coach
- Carlos "Bobby" Trevino (Monterrey, Mexico) - former MLB outfielder - California Angels
- Rick Wise (Portland, Oregon) - former MLB pitcher
