= 1960 Little League World Series =

Children's baseball tournament

Tournament details
- Dates: August 23–August 27
- Teams: 8

Final positions
- Champions: (United States) American Little League; Levittown, Pennsylvania
- Runners-up: (United States) North East Optimist Club Little League; Fort Worth, Texas

The 1960 Little League World Series took place between August 23 and August 27 in South Williamsport, Pennsylvania. American Little League of Levittown, Pennsylvania, defeated North East Optimist Club Little League of Fort Worth, Texas, in the championship game of the 14th Little League World Series. Joe Mormello Jr. tossed a no-hitter, striking out 16 batters in the final game en route to a 5–0 shutout.

== Teams ==
Countries, States and Provinces represented at the 1960 Little League World Series

United States	International
(Ohio) New Boston, Ohio; North Region; New Boston Kiwanis Little League	(Ontario) Toronto, Ontario; Canada Region; Parkdale Little League
(Pennsylvania) Levittown, Pennsylvania; East Region; American Little League	(West Germany) Berlin, West Germany; Europe Region; Berlin Command Little League
(Texas) Fort Worth, Texas; South Region; North East Optimist Club Little League	(Hawaii) Honolulu, Hawaii; Pacific Region; Pearl Harbor Little League
(California) Lakewood, California; West Region; East Lakewood Little League	(Mexico) Monterrey, Nuevo León, Mexico; Latin America Region; Industrial Little League

== Championship bracket ==
Quarter-finals
Pennsylvania	5
Hawaii	2
California	11
Ohio	8
Mexico	7
West Germany	4
Texas	5
Canada	0

Semi-finals
Pennsylvania	9
California	1
Mexico	1
Texas	5

Final
Pennsylvania	5
Texas	0
Third place
California	4
Mexico	3

== Consolation bracket ==
Games A & B
Hawaii	4
Ohio	0
West Germany	6
Canada	3

Game D
Hawaii	7
West Germany	2
Game C
Ohio	5
Canada	0

1960 Little League World Series Champions
American Little League
Levittown, Pennsylvania
