= 1952 Little League World Series =

Children's baseball tournament

- Championship team from Norwalk, Connecticut

Tournament details
- Dates: August 26–August 29
- Teams: 8

Final positions
- Champions: Norwalk, Connecticut
- Runners-up: Monongahela, Pennsylvania

The 1952 Little League World Series was held from August 26 to August 29 in Williamsport, Pennsylvania. A team from Norwalk, Connecticut, beat Monongahela, Pennsylvania, by a score of 4–3 in the championship game of the 6th Little League World Series. A team from Montreal, Quebec, Canada, became the first participants from outside the United States in the event's history.

Attendees at the championship game included Frank Shaughnessy, president of the International League, and Will Harridge, president of the American League.

== Teams ==
States and provinces represented at the 1952 Little League World Series

Region 1	Montreal, Quebec, Canada
Region 2	Norwalk, Connecticut
Region 3	Monongahela, Pennsylvania
Region 4	Hackensack, New Jersey
Region 5	Mooresville, North Carolina
Region 6	Whiting, Indiana
Region 7	Little Rock, Arkansas
Region 8	San Diego, California

== Results ==
Quarter-finals
August 26
California	1
Arkansas	0
August 26
Connecticut	10
Indiana	7
August 26
New Jersey	13
Quebec	7
August 27
Pennsylvania	3
North Carolina	2

Semi-finals
August 27 (F/7)
California	2
Connecticut	3
August 28
New Jersey	1
Pennsylvania	10

Final
August 29
Connecticut	4
Pennsylvania	3
Third place
August 29
California	0
New Jersey	2
