= 1963 Little League World Series =

Children's baseball tournament

Tournament details
- Dates: August 20–August 24
- Teams: 7

Final positions
- Champions: (United States) Granada Hills National Little League; Granada Hills, California
- Runners-up: (United States) Stratford Original Little League; Stratford, Connecticut

The 1963 Little League World Series took place between August 20 and August 24 in South Williamsport, Pennsylvania. Granada Hills National Little League of Granada Hills, California, defeated Stratford Original Little League of Stratford, Connecticut, in the championship game of the 17th Little League World Series.

For the first time, the championship game was televised, as highlights were broadcast by ABC on Wide World of Sports. This was the third consecutive title for the state of California, which remains the longest winning streak by a U.S. state.

== Teams ==
United States	International
(Minnesota) Duluth, Minnesota; North Region; Central Little League	Valleyfield, Quebec, Canada; Canada Region; Rotary Little League
(Connecticut) Stratford, Connecticut; East Region; Stratford Original Little League	(Turkey) İzmir, Turkey; Europe Region; İzmir Little League
(Texas) North Houston, Texas; South Region; North Houston Little League	Tokyo, Japan (withdrew); Far East Region; Gyokusen Little League
(California) Granada Hills, California; West Region; Granada Hills Little League National	(Mexico) Monterrey, Nuevo León, Mexico; Latin America Region; Obispado Little League

== Winners bracket ==
Quarterfinals
Texas	2
California (F/9)	3
Connecticut	5
Canada	1
Mexico	2
Minnesota	5

Semifinals
California	14
Turkey	0
Connecticut	5
Minnesota	2

Final
California (F/7)	2
Connecticut	1
Third place
Turkey	1
Minnesota	3

== Consolation bracket ==
Game A		Game B
		Texas	5
Canada	3	Mexico	1
Mexico	4

1963 Little League World Series Champions
Granada Hills National Little League
Granada Hills, California
