= 1976 Little League World Series =

Children's baseball tournament

Tournament details
- Dates: August 24–August 28
- Teams: 8

Final positions
- Champions: Chofu Little League; Tokyo, Japan
- Runners-up: (United States) Campbell Little League; Campbell, California

The 1976 Little League World Series took place between August 24 and August 28 in South Williamsport, Pennsylvania. The Chofu Little League of Tokyo, Japan, defeated the Campbell Little League of Campbell, California, in the championship game of the 30th Little League World Series.

This was the first LLWS to place the International and U.S. teams on different sides of the bracket.

== Teams ==
United States	International
(Iowa) Des Moines, Iowa; Central Region; Windsor Little League	Trail, British Columbia; Canada Region; Trail Little League
(Connecticut) Bristol, Connecticut; East Region; Forestville Little League	(Germany) Kaiserslautern, Germany; Europe Region; Kaiserslautern Little League
(Virginia) Richmond, Virginia; South Region; Tuckahoe National Little League	(Japan) Tokyo, Japan; Far East Region; Chofu Little League
(California) Campbell, California; West Region; Campbell Little League	(Puerto Rico) Puerto Nuevo, Puerto Rico; Latin America Region; Canales Little League

- Puerto Rico an unincorporated territory of the United States.

== Winners bracket ==
Quarter-finals
August 24
Canada	4
Puerto Rico	9
August 25
Japan	25
Germany	0
August 24
Connecticut	0
California	7
August 25
Iowa	3
Virginia	4

Semi-finals
August 26
Puerto Rico	0
Japan	4
August 26
California	3
Virginia	0

Final
August 28
Japan	10
California	3

- The consolation game between Puerto Nuevo, Puerto Rico, and Richmond, Virginia, was cancelled due to inclement weather; both teams shared third place.

== Consolation bracket ==
Games A & B
August 24
Canada	2
Connecticut	3
August 25
Germany	10
Iowa	0

Game D
August 26
Connecticut	4
Germany	1
Game C
August 26
Canada	7
Iowa	5

1976 Little League World Series Champions
Chofu Little League
Tokyo, Japan

== Notable players ==
- Ray Ferraro of the Trail, British Columbia, team went on to play in the NHL as a center from 1984 to 2002.
