= 2021 Little League World Series =

Children's baseball tournament

Tournament details
- Dates: August 19–August 29
- Teams: 16 (US-based only)

Final positions
- Champions: Taylor North Little League, Taylor, Michigan
- Runners-up: West Side Little League, Hamilton, Ohio

The 2021 Little League World Series was held from August 19 to August 29 at the Little League headquarters complex in South Williamsport, Pennsylvania as the 74th edition of the Little League World Series. Due to the COVID-19 pandemic, the event was limited to US-based teams only. The most recent prior edition of the tournament contested without international teams had been 1975. Taylor North Little League of Taylor, Michigan, defeated West Side Little League of Hamilton, Ohio, in the championship by a 5–2 score. It was the first championship for a team from Michigan since 1959.

On August 13, it was announced that tickets would not be distributed to the public due to concerns over the Delta variant, with spectators limited to invited friends and family of teams, and other high-level supporters.

== Teams ==
The 16-team field consisted of the top two teams from eight regional tournaments, contested during July and August.

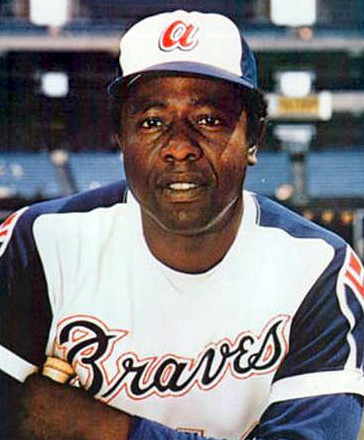
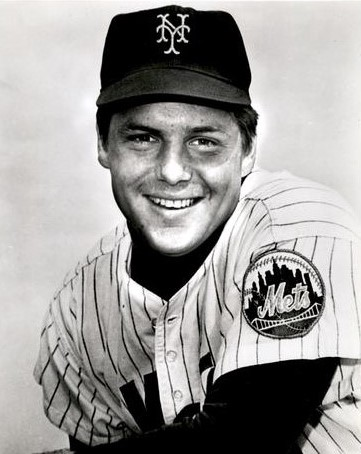
Tournament bracket namesakes, Hank Aaron (top) and Tom Seaver

United States
Region	Regional winner	Regional runner-up
Great Lakes Region	(Michigan) Taylor, Michigan; Taylor North Little League	(Ohio) Hamilton, Ohio; West Side Little League
Mid-Atlantic Region	(Pennsylvania) Oaks, Pennsylvania; Upper Providence Little League	Toms River, New Jersey; Toms River East Little League
Midwest Region	(Nebraska) Hastings, Nebraska; Hastings Baseball Little League	(South Dakota) Sioux Falls, South Dakota; Sioux Falls Little League
New England Region	(New Hampshire) Hooksett, New Hampshire; North Manchester–Hooksett LL	(Connecticut) Manchester, Connecticut; Manchester Little League
Northwest Region	(Washington (state)) Sammamish, Washington; Eastlake Little League	(Oregon) Lake Oswego, Oregon; Lake Oswego Little League
Southeast Region	(Tennessee) Nolensville, Tennessee; Nolensville Little League	(Florida) Palm City, Florida; Martin County North Little League
Southwest Region	(Louisiana) Lafayette, Louisiana; Lafayette Little League	(Texas) Abilene, Texas; Wylie Little League
West Region	(Hawaii) Honolulu, Hawaii; Honolulu Little League	(California) Torrance, California; Torrance Little League

The eight teams appearing on a grey background were placed in the Tom Seaver championship bracket, while the other eight teams were placed in the Hank Aaron championship bracket.

Ella Bruning of the team from Abilene, Texas, became one of the few girls who have competed in the Little League World Series.

== Results ==
The draw to determine the opening round pairings took place on June 18, 2021.

=== Hank Aaron championship ===
Upper round 1	Upper round 2	Upper final	Final
August 19 – Game 1
Hawaii	9
August 22 – Game 14 (F/7)
Connecticut	1
Hawaii	11
August 19 – Game 3
Nebraska	3
Nebraska	5
August 25 – Game 24
New Jersey	2
Hawaii	2
August 20 – Game 6
Michigan	0
Michigan	8
August 23 – Game 15
Florida	0
Michigan	6
August 20 – Game 8
Texas	5
(Washington (state)) Washington	0	August 28 – Hank Aaron championship
Texas	6	Hawaii	1
Michigan	2
Lower round 1	Lower round 2	Lower round 3	Lower final
August 24 – Game 17
August 21 – Game 10	Texas	2	August 26 – Game 25
Connecticut	4	New Jersey	1	August 25 – Game 22 (F/5)	Michigan	15
New Jersey	11	Texas	10	Texas	6
August 23 – Game 20	Nebraska	0
August 21 – Game 11	Nebraska	3
Florida	0	Washington	2
Washington	1

=== Tom Seaver championship ===
Upper round 1	Upper round 2	Upper final	Final
August 19 – Game 2 (F/8)
Tennessee	0
August 22 – Game 13
Ohio	1
Ohio	0
August 19 – Game 4
California	9
New Hampshire	2
August 25 – Game 23
California	10
California	0
August 20 – Game 5
South Dakota	1
Pennsylvania	2
August 23 – Game 16
Oregon	8
Oregon	0
August 20 – Game 7
South Dakota	3
Louisiana	0	August 28 – Tom Seaver championship
South Dakota	2	South Dakota	2
Ohio	5
Lower round 1	Lower round 2	Lower round 3	Lower final
August 24 – Game 18
August 21 – Game 9	Oregon	6	August 26 – Game 26
Tennessee	1	New Hampshire	14	August 25 – Game 21	California	2
New Hampshire	4	New Hampshire	3	Ohio	4
August 23 – Game 19	Ohio	4
August 21 – Game 12	Ohio	8
Pennsylvania	3	Louisiana	2
Louisiana	5

=== Consolation game ===
Consolation Game
August 29 – Lamade Stadium
South Dakota	0
Hawaii	5

=== World Championship ===
The championship game was a rematch of the Great Lakes regional final during the qualification stage, which was won by Michigan, 9–1.

World Championship
August 29 – Lamade Stadium
Ohio	2
Michigan	5

2021 Little League World Series Champions
Taylor North Little League
Taylor, Michigan

== Champions path ==
The Taylor North LL reached the LLWS with an undefeated record in seven games. In total, their record was 16–1, with their only loss coming to Hawaii in the third round of double-elimination play in South Williamsport.

Round	Opposition	Result
Michigan State Tournament
Quarterfinal Round	Western LL	9–1
Semifinal Round	Bay City Southwest LL	4–2
Championship Game	Roosevelt Park LL	9–2
Great Lakes Regional Tournament
Winner's Bracket Opening Round	(Wisconsin) Elmbrook National LL	10–0 (F/5)
Winner's Bracket Semifinal	(Indiana) Brownsburg LL	9–1
Semifinal	(Illinois) Hinsdale LL	10–0 (F/5)
Finals	(Ohio) West Side LL	9–1

== 2021 MLB Little League Classic ==
The MLB Little League Classic game at Muncy Bank Ballpark at Historic Bowman Field in nearby Williamsport, Pennsylvania, was played on August 22 between the Cleveland Indians and Los Angeles Angels. Cleveland won the game, 3–0. The fourth edition of the Classic to be played, it became the first edition contested between American League teams, after the 2020 game scheduled between the Boston Red Sox and Baltimore Orioles was cancelled due to the COVID-19 pandemic.
