= Little League World Series (Far East Region) =

Children's baseball tournament

Far East Region
- Most recent season or competition: 2000 Little League World Series
- Sport: Baseball
- Founded: 1962
- Folded: 2001 (split into Pacific and Asia regions)
- No. of teams: 18
- Country: International
- Most titles: Taiping Little League, Taichung, Taiwan (3)

The Far East East Region was one of four international regions that competed in the Little League World Series from 1962 to 2000. Far East qualifiers won a record 23 titles — 17 from Taiwan, four from Japan, and two from the Republic of Korea.

Teams from East Asia were first allowed to qualify for the Little League World Series in 1961. A team from Japan lost to Hawaii in the original Pacific Region's qualifying game. The following year the Far East Region was created, with the Japanese champion receiving an automatic berth in the World Series. The first multinational Far East Regional Tournament took place in 1969 and featured six countries.

In 2001, the World Series expanded to 16 teams. Originally they considered making Japan its own region, leaving the rest of the Far East Region unchanged, but in the end split it into two regions:

- the Pacific Region (consisting of teams from the Pacific Islands, Indonesia, and Oceania), and
- the Asia Region (consisting of teams from Taiwan, Japan, and mainland Asia).

In 2007, the regions were again reconfigured to match the original plan: Japan was given an automatic berth in the Series, while the remaining Asian and Pacific teams merged to create the Asia-Pacific Region.

== Far East Region countries ==
- Australia
- China
- Guam
- Hong Kong
- India
- Indonesia
- Japan
- Micronesia
- New Zealand
- Northern Mariana Islands
- Pakistan
- Palau
- Papua New Guinea
- Philippines
- South Korea
- Sri Lanka
- Taiwan
- Thailand

== Controversies ==
=== 1975 ban ===
From 1972 to 1974, Taiwan dominated the LLWS, outscoring their opponents 112–2. In 1973, they did not allow a hit.

On November 11, 1974, Little League Baseball announced that all non-US teams were banned from competing in the Little League World Series. Initially, travel costs and nationalism were the reasons given. But, many made the connection to the success of the Far East teams. A representative of the Taiwanese Baseball Association also read between the lines, "We are suffering from a strange phenomenon, we are too good."

Several months later, Little League Baseball did give a more detailed reason for the ban. "There was too much emphasis on this particular age group, and this happened in Latin America, as well as the Far East and other places in which it became a more Olympic type activity.

Despite being banned from the Little League World Series, international leagues still held regional championships. In the 1975 Far East Tournament, Taiwan defeated Japan in a controversial contest. The ban was only limited to the Little League division. International teams could still compete at the Senior and Big League World Series. Taiwan would win both of those tournaments, the Far East hegemony encompassed each level of youth baseball.

In December 1975, the international ban was repealed with a 12–1 vote. The decision came with a caveat; the tournament would now be split into two brackets. One side for the U.S. teams, and the other for the internationals. This would give the U.S. a 50/50 chance of winning the championship every year, but it also made the road easier for the Far East and Latin America teams. The four international regions—Canada, Europe, Far East, and Latin America—were not all at the same skill level. The lesser skill levels of the Canada Region and Europe Region teams therefore turned the international side into a foregone conclusion; the Far East Region or Latin America Region champion would make the final game every year that followed the bracket split.

=== 1992 Zamboanga City disqualification ===
For the first time ever, a team from the Philippines won the Far East Region tournament. The team headed to Williamsport and advanced to the final. The championship game, against Long Beach, California, was a blowout, with Zamboanga City winning, 15-4, after a 7-run first inning. The team was hailed as heroes in the Philippines, with President Ramos giving the team a gift of 1 million pesos to contribute to the livelihood of their families. Long Beach head coach Jeff Burroughs remarked that semi-final pitcher Roberto Placious had the poise of a high school or college pitcher.

There had been some suspicions about the Zamboanaga City team soon after it arrived in Williamsport. Several committee members didn't think the manager and coach seemed "typical." However, nothing more came of it after assurances were given that the manager and coach were from the same league as the players and had coached in that league during the regular season. A few days after Zamboanga City's triumphant victory, however, journalist Al Mendoza of the Philippine Daily Inquirer began publishing stories suggesting that some players were ineligible. He'd received letters from several neighbors and relatives claiming that several players were too old for Little League. Local administrator Armando Andaya was faxed four questions from Little League president Creighton Hale, regarding player ages, birth certificates, residence, and a specific question regarding winning championship game pitcher Ian Tolentino's participation in a tournament in 1990 (possibly with the view of suggesting this would have made him over-age). Andaya admitted to violating rules on district representation - eight players were from outside the Zamboanga City area, some as far away as Luzon, and unable to speak Chabacano, the language most commonly spoken in Zamboanga. Andaya claimed that the eight players replaced, for various reasons, were unable to go to China for the Far East series and that the out-of-district substitutes were only used to make up numbers rather than to give the team an extra edge over their opponents. He also admitted that the team's original coach had been replaced with someone from Manila.

Little League Baseball stripped Zamboanga City of its title. Under Little League rules at the time, when a team was found to have used an ineligible player, it forfeited only its most recent game (otherwise they would have to put the entire tournament on hold while the teams that lost to the illegal team were put back into the tournament). Since the revelation was made after the championship game, that game was declared a 6-0 forfeit victory by Long Beach, which was awarded the championship. The exposed players and parents remained defiant, and accused Little League Baseball of denying them due process.

With many Filipinos outraged at what they saw as an unpatriotic betrayal by Mendoza, who was given the key to the city of Long Beach, fellow Inquirer journalist Armand N. Nocum conducted further investigation and found that even the six true Zamboangueños were over-age, including at least two as old as 15, and thus ineligible. It was discovered that, as with the eight non-district players, the fraud had been maintained by the players' assumption of identities of (eligible) players who had represented the city at the national championships, the families of whom were reportedly willing to reveal all, jealous of the prizes bestowed upon the players who had used their sons' identities to represent their country at the Far East and World Series. In some cases, even the parents of the ineligible players assumed appropriate identities to maintain the appearance of propriety. Nocum, a native of the area, had not wanted to believe such an egregious fraud was taking place, but discovered that even school officials were in on the cover-up. Later, Nocum, seemingly backing Andaya's assertion that the substitutes were not chosen to artificially inflate the team's performance, told Sports Illustrated that had the original Zamboanga City team participated in the World Series, they would have trounced Long Beach by at least 30-4.

In an interesting post-script, Zamboanga City was disqualified from the Filipino national titles the very next year in another over-age player scandal.

=== 1993 Far East Tournament ===
Following the Zamboanga City scandal, Little League announced that they would be enforcing boundary and age limits more strictly. At the 1993 Far East Tournament Taiwan defeated Japan to claim yet another berth in Williamsport. South Korea and China rounded out the top 4. The World Series berth, however, was given to the fifth place team from Saipan, Northern Mariana Islands. The top 4 had all failed to meet the new rule requirements and were disqualified. The team from Saipan went 1–2 in Williamsport, making it the first time since 1970 that Far East Champion did not make the semifinals.

The Latin America champion from the Dominican Republic was also disqualified under similar circumstances.

=== Taiwan leaves Little League ===
In April 1997, the Taiwan Baseball Association decided that its youth baseball programs would no longer affiliate with Little League. “The leagues in Taiwan were unable at that time to adhere to certain Little League rules and regulations regarding residency, and the area from which a single chartered league could draw its players,” said Stephen D. Keener, president and chief executive officer of Little League Baseball.

Taiwan would re-join Little League in 2003, and won their first championship since returning in 2025.

== Far East Champions in the Little League World Series ==
Year	Champion	City	LLWS	Record
1962	Kunitachi LL	(Japan) Kunitachi	Not in Top 4	1–2
1963	Gyokusen LL	(Japan) Tokyo	Withdrew	
1964	Tachikawa City LL	(Japan) Tokyo	4th place	1–2
1965	Arakawa LL	(Japan) Tokyo	Not in Top 4	1–2
1966	Wakayama LL	(Japan) Osaka	4th place	1–2
1967	West Tokyo LL	(Japan) Tokyo	Champions	3–0
1968	Wakayama LL	(Japan) Osaka	Champions	3–0
1969	Taichung LL	(Taiwan) Taichung	Champions	3–0
1970	Chiayi LL	(Taiwan) Chiayi	Not in Top 4	2–1
1971	Tainan LL	(Taiwan) Tainan	Champions	3–0
1972	Taipei LL	(Taiwan) Taipei	Champions	3–0
1973	Tainan LL	(Taiwan) Tainan	Champions	3–0
1974	Kaohsiung LL	(Taiwan) Kaohsiung	Champions	3–0
1975	Gushan LL	(Taiwan) Kaohsiung	Banned ^{[a]}	
1976	Chofu LL	(Japan) Tokyo	Champions	3–0
1977	Li-Teh LL	(Taiwan) Kaohsiung	Champions	3–0
1978	Pinkuang LL	(Taiwan) Pingtung	Champions	3–0
1979	Puzih LL	(Taiwan) Chiayi	Champions	3–0
1980	Longkuong LL	(Taiwan) Hualien	Champions	3–0
1981	Taiping LL	(Taiwan) Taichung	Champions	3–0
1982	Puzih LL	(Taiwan) Chiayi	Runner-up	2–1
1983	Yodogawa LL	(Japan) Osaka	3rd place	2–1
1984	National LL	(South Korea) Seoul	Champions	3–0
1985	National LL	(South Korea) Seoul	Champions	3–0
1986	Tainan Park LL	(Taiwan) Tainan	Champions	3–0
1987	Taiping LL	(Taiwan) Hualien	Champions	3–0
1988	Taiping LL	(Taiwan) Taichung	Champions	3–0
1989	Kang-Tu LL	(Taiwan) Kaohsiung	Runner-up	2–1
1990	San Hua LL	(Taiwan) Tainan	Champions	3–0
1991	Hsi Nan LL	(Taiwan) Taichung	Champions	3–0
1992	Zamboanga City LL	(Philippines) Zamboanga City	Vacated ^{[b]}	3–2
1993	Taiping LL	(Taiwan) Taichung	Disqualified ^{[c]}	
1993	CNMI LL	(Northern Mariana Islands) Saipan	Not in Top 4	1–2
1994	Li-Jen LL	(Taiwan) Tainan	Not in Top 4	1–2
1995	Shan-Hua LL	(Taiwan) Tainan	Champions	5–0
1996	Fu-Hsing LL	(Taiwan) Kaohsiung	Champions	5–0
1997	Seya LL	(Japan) Yokohama	3rd place	2–2
1998	Kashima LL	(Japan) Kashima	Runner-Up	3–2
1999	Hirakata LL	(Japan) Hirakata	Champions	4–1
2000	Musashi-Fuchu LL	(Japan) Tokyo	3rd place	3–1

== LLWS results by country ==
The following table lists each country's record in the Little League World Series during the era of the Far East Region.

Country	Far East Championships	LLWS Championships	Record in LLWS	PCT
Taiwan	23	17	62–5	.925
Japan	13	4	27–15	.643
South Korea	2	2	6–0	1.000
Philippines	1	0	3–2	.600
Northern Mariana Islands	0	0	1–2	.333
Total	39	23	99–24	.805

== Milestones ==
- 23 overall championships
- 10 straight championships (1971–1981)
- 34 game winning streak (1970–1982)

== See also ==
- Baseball awards § Asia
- Little League World Series (Asia-Pacific and Middle East Region)
- Little League World Series in Japan

Asia-Pacific Region in other Little League divisions

- Intermediate League
- Junior League
- Senior League
- Big League

== Notes ==
- ^{a} In 1975 Little League Banned all International teams from competing at the World Series. The dominance of the Far East was a contributing factor.
- ^{b} Zamboanga City, Philippines appeared in the 1992 Little League World Series, winning the championship, but were disqualified after the completion of the tournament when it was revealed that several players did not meet eligibility requirements regarding age and residency.
- ^{c} The 1993 Far East Championship was won by a team from Taiwan, but they were disqualified from the Little League World Series for breaking rules regarding age and residency requirements. Taiwan was replaced by a team from Saipan, which went 1–2 and tied for fifth place.
