= List of Little League World Series appearances by region =

This is the list of regions that have sent teams to the Little League World Series since its inception in 1947. Many regions have gone through major realignment over the years. As of 2026, 22 regions are active, 10 from the United States and 12 from international. The Far East region, inactive since 2000, has won the most overall championships (23). The Canada and the Latin America region are the longest running ones, sending teams to LLWS since 1958.

== LLWS Regions ==
As of the 2026 Little League World Series.

Region	Country	Status	First LLWS	Last Appearance	Appearances	Championships	Runners-up	Third place Finishes	Record in LLWS	PCT
Great Lakes	U.S.	Active	2001	2026	26	2	1	0	42–51	.452
Metro	U.S.	Active	2022	2026	5	0	0	1	11–9	.550
Mid-Atlantic	U.S.	Active	2001	2026	26	1	1	0	39–48	.448
Midwest	U.S.	Active	2001	2026	26	0	0	0	22–61	.265
Mountain	U.S.	Active	2022	2026	5	0	2	0	13–9	.591
New England	U.S.	Active	2001	2026	26	0	0	0	32–55	.368
Northwest	U.S.	Active	2001	2026	26	1	0	2	38–52	.422
Southeast	U.S.	Active	2001	2026	26	3	3	0	71–51	.582
Southwest	U.S.	Active	2001	2026	26	1	1	3	62–52	.544
West	U.S.	Active	2001	2026	26	6	4	3	89–36	.712
Canada (Note: Canada, as a team, also qualified to the LLWS via the U.S. Region 1 (1952) and Region 8 (1953), before the Canada region was formed.)	International	Active	1958	2026	66	0	1	2	60–139	.302
Asia-Pacific and Middle East	International	Active	2013	2026	12	2	3	2	40–16	.714
Japan (Note: Japan, as a team, also qualified to the LLWS via the Far East (1962–2000) and the Asia (2001–2006) region, before the Japan region was formed.)	International	Active	2007	2026	18	5	2	5	67–23	.744
Europe and Africa	International	Active	2013	2026	12	0	0	0	3–29	.094
Latin America	International	Active	1958	2026	66	4	3	13	130–103	.558
Panama	International	Active	2022	2026	4	0	0	0	4–8	.333
Mexico (Note: Mexico, as a team, also qualified to the LLWS via the U.S. South (1957), the Latin America (1958–1998), and the U.S. West (1985) region, before the Mexico region was formed.)	International	Active	2001	2026	24	0	1	5	63–47	.573
Caribbean	International	Active	2001	2026	24	1	4	3	64–47	.577
Puerto Rico	International	Active	2022	2025	3	0	0	0	0–6	.000
Cuba	International	Active	2023	2024	2	0	0	0	2–4	.333
Curaçao	International	Active	2026	2026	1	1	0	0	5–0	1.000
Australia	International	Active	2013	2026	12	0	0	0	6–27	.182
Central (Note: The Central region was known as the North region between 1957 and 1972.)	U.S.	Inactive	1957	2000	44	1	5	8	54–74	.422
East	U.S.	Inactive	1957	2000	44	7	4	9	70–66	.515
South	U.S.	Inactive	1957	2000	44	3 (Note: One of the championships was won by Mexico, an international team participating in the South region, in 1957.)	10	15	74–57	.565
West (1957–2000)	U.S.	Inactive	1957	2000	44	6	17	7	85–50	.630
Pacific (1958–1961)	U.S.	Inactive	1958	1961	4	0	0	0	3–6	.333
Far East	International	Inactive	1962	2000	37	23	3	3	99–24	.805
Asia	International	Inactive	2001	2006	6	2	2	0	27–7	.794
Pacific (2001–2006)	International	Inactive	2001	2006	6	0	0	0	8–13	.381
Asia-Pacific	International	Inactive	2007	2012	6	0	1	1	13–11	.542
Europe (1960–2000)	International	Inactive	1960	2000	40	0	0	2	24–94	.203
Europe, Middle East & Africa	International	Inactive	2001	2007	7	0	0	0	1–20	.048
Transatlantic	International	Inactive	2001	2007	7	0	0	0	7–14	.333
Europe (2008–2012)	International	Inactive	2008	2012	5	0	0	0	1–14	.067
Middle East-Africa	International	Inactive	2008	2012	5	0	0	0	3–12	.200
Invitation	U.S.	Inactive	1947	1948	8	2	2	0	–	–
Region 1	U.S.	Inactive	1949	1956	8	0	1	2	7–9	.438
Region 2	U.S.	Inactive	1949	1956	8	4	1	0	14–4	.778
Region 3	U.S.	Inactive	1949	1956	8	1	1	1	8–8	.500
Region 4	U.S.	Inactive	1949	1956	8	0	2	3	12–10	.545
Region 5	U.S.	Inactive	1949	1956	8	1	0	1	5–7	.417
Region 6	U.S.	Inactive	1949	1956	8	0	1	0	3–9	.250
Region 7	U.S.	Inactive	1949	1956	8	1	1	1	7–7	.500
Region 8	U.S.	Inactive	1949	1956	8	1	1	0	8–10	.444
Total					833	79	78	92		

== See also ==
- List of Little League World Series appearances by U.S. state
- List of Little League World Series appearances by country
