= Little League World Series 1957–2000 (West Region) =

US children's baseball tournament

The original West Region was a region that competed in the Little League World Series between 1957 and 2000 until it was split into a Northwest Region and a new West Region in 2001.

The West Region was inaugurated in 1957. The Region consisted of teams from Alaska, Arizona, Northern California, Southern California, Colorado, Hawaii (since 1962), Idaho, Montana, Nevada, New Mexico, Oregon, Utah, Washington, and Wyoming. Before 1962, Hawaiian teams competed in the Pacific Region (see below). Prior to 1966, teams from Western Canada also competed in the West Region.

Little League Baseball expanded the LLWS to sixteen teams for the 2001 Little League World Series. At the same time, the original West Region was split into a new West Region (Arizona, Northern California, Southern California, Hawaii, Nevada, New Mexico, and Utah) and a Northwest Region (Alaska, Colorado, Idaho, Montana, Oregon, Washington, and Wyoming). Colorado and New Mexico moved to the Southwest Region for the 2002 tournament. Between 2002 and 2005, Hawaii competed in the Northwest Region and Wyoming competed in the West Region, before switching back to the original configuration in 2006.

== Champions in the West Region (1957–2000) ==
The following table indicates the West Region champion and its LLWS performance in each year between 1957 and 2000.

Year	Champion	City	LLWS	Record
1957	Northern La Mesa LL	La Mesa, California	Runner-Up	1–1
1958	Rose City LL	Portland, Oregon	1st Round	0–1
1959	West Auburn LL	Auburn, California	Runner-Up	2–1
1960	East Lakewood LL	Lakewood, California	3rd Place	2–1
1961	Northern LL	El Cajon, California	Champions	3–0
1962	Moreland LL	San Jose, California	Champions	3–0
1963	Granada Hills National LL	Granada Hills, California	Champions	3–0
1964	National LL	La Puente, California	7th Place	1–2
1965	South Mountain LL	Phoenix, Arizona	7th Place	1–2
1966	Airport LL	Sacramento, California	3rd Place	2–1
1967	Northridge City LL	Northridge, California	5th Place (tie)	1–1
1968	Bolsa LL	Garden Grove, California	3rd Place	2–1
1969	Briarwood LL	Santa Clara, California	Runner-Up	2–1
1970	Campbell LL	Campbell, California	Runner-Up	2–1
1971	Wahiawa American LL	Oahu, Hawaii	3rd Place	2–1
1972	Community LL	Pearl City, Hawaii	3rd Place (tie)	1–1
1973	Cactus LL	Tucson, Arizona	Runner-Up	2–1
1974	Red Bluff LL	Red Bluff, California	Runner-Up	2–1
1975	American LL	Northridge, California	4th Place	0–2
1976	Campbell LL	Campbell, California	Runner-Up	2–1
1977	Western LL	El Cajon, California	Runner-Up	2–1
1978	San Ramon Valley LL	Danville, California	Runner-Up	2–1
1979	Campbell LL	Campbell, California	Runner-Up	2–1
1980	National LL	(Washington (state)) Kirkland, Washington	3rd Place	2–1
1981	National LL	Escondido, California	5th Place	2–1
1982	National LL	(Washington (state)) Kirkland, Washington	Champions	3–0
1983	Pacific LL	Sacramento, California	6th Place	1–2
1984	Los Gatos LL	Los Gatos, California	6th Place	1–2
1985	Mexicali LL	Mexicali, Mexico	Runner-Up	2–1
1986	International LL	Tucson, Arizona	Runner-Up	2–1
1987	Northwood LL	Irvine, California	Runner-Up	2–1
1988	Pearl City LL	Pearl City, Hawaii	Runner-Up	2–1
1989	Eastview LL	San Pedro, California	4th Place	1–2
1990	Federal LL	Cypress, California	4th Place	1–2
1991	San Ramon Valley LL	Danville, California	Runner-Up	2–1
1992	Long Beach LL	Long Beach, California	Champions	5–0
1993	Long Beach LL	Long Beach, California	Champions	5–0
1994	Northridge City LL	Northridge, California	Runner-Up	3–2
1995	Yorba Hills LL	Yorba Linda, California	3rd Place (tie)	2–2
1996	Moorpark LL	Moorpark, California	3rd place, Group Stage	1–2
1997	South Mission Viejo LL	Mission Viejo, California	Runner-Up	4–1
1998	Cypress LL	Cypress, California	3rd place, Group Stage	1–2
1999	South Central Boise LL	Boise, Idaho	3rd place, Group Stage	1–2
2000	Hazel Dell LL	(Washington (state)) Vancouver, Washington	3rd place, Group Stage	2–1

== Champions in the Pacific Region (1958–1961) ==
A team from Hawaii represented the Pacific Region in the Little League World Series between 1958 and 1961. Between 1958 and 1960, the Hawaiian state champions received an automatic berth (as there were no foreign nations in the Pacific Region); in 1961, Hilo American Little League defeated a team from Japan in a playoff for the Pacific Region berth. Starting in 1962, teams from Japan competed in the newly created Far East Region and Hawaii moved to the West Region.

Year	Champion	City	LLWS	Record
1958	Pearl Harbor LL	Honolulu, Hawaii	1st Round	0–1
1959	Windward LL	Oahu, Hawaii	4th Place	0–2
1960	Pearl Harbor LL	Honolulu, Hawaii	5th Place	2–1
1961	Hilo American LL	Hilo, Hawaii	4th Place	1–2

== Results by state ==
Total does not include Hawaii's four appearances representing the Pacific Region (1958–1961) in the tournament. "Italics" indicates team is no longer in region.

Country	West Region Championships	LLWS Championships	Record in LLWS	PCT
California	32	5	65–37	.637
(Washington (state)) Washington	3	1	7–2	.778
Hawaii	3	0	5–3	.625
Arizona	3	0	5–4	.556
Mexico	1	0	2–1	.667
Idaho	1	0	1–2	.333
Oregon	1	0	0–1	.000
Total	44	6	85–50	.630

== See also ==
- Little League World Series (Northwest Region)
- Little League World Series (West Region)
