= Danny Almonte =

Dominican Republic baseball player (born 1987)

- Pitcher
- Born: April 7, 1987 (age 39); Moca, Dominican Republic
- Bats: Left Throws: Left
- Stats at Baseball Reference

Danny Almonte Rojas (born April 7, 1987) is a Dominican-American former baseball player who was an assistant baseball coach at Cardinal Hayes High School in New York City. Born in Moca in the Dominican Republic, Almonte was a Little League pitcher who threw up to 79 miles per hour (127 km/h). Considered a phenomenon as he led his Bronx team to a third place finish in the 2001 Little League World Series, Almonte was revealed to have actually been two years too old to play Little League baseball. Although there were many allegations during the 2001 Series, the truth was not revealed until weeks later.

== Little League Baseball ==
In early 2000, Danny Almonte moved to The Bronx, New York City, where he began playing Little League Baseball. His father, Felipe, who had moved to the US six years earlier, had begun a youth baseball league in Moca that still bears his name.

=== 2001 Little League World Series ===
Almonte threw a no hitter in the 2001 Mid-Atlantic Regional finals against State College, Pennsylvania, sending his team to the Little League World Series in South Williamsport, Pennsylvania. With his high leg kick and a fastball that reached a top speed of 76 miles per hour (122 km/h)—the equivalent, for that distance, of a 102 mph (164 km/h) major-league fastball)—the 5-foot-8-inch (1.73 m) Danny soon became a sensation. His imposing frame won him the nickname "Little Unit," a nod to Randy Johnson, nicknamed "Big Unit".

In a round robin game four days later, Almonte threw the first perfect game in the Little League World Series since 1979, (Note: Contemporary news reports indicated it was the first perfect game since the 1957 edition; however, Taiwan recorded a perfect game in the 1979 edition.) against the team from Apopka, Florida. However, his team was defeated by the same Florida team in the U.S. championship game—Almonte could not pitch in the championship game under Little League rules, as he had pitched a complete game the day before.

Almonte completed the tournament with 62 strikeouts (out of 72 batters faced), giving up only three hits in three starts, and only one unearned run. His team, nicknamed "the Baby Bombers" because they played in the shadow of Yankee Stadium, was the feel-good story of the tournament, and were honored before a New York Yankees game shortly after the Series. They also received the key to the city from Mayor Rudy Giuliani.

=== Concerns about age ===
Almonte's imposing appearance and command on the mound, as well as the velocity of his fastball, led to rumors that he was older than 12 years old, the age limit for Little League Baseball. A team from Staten Island hired a private investigator to look into the ages of the entire team. A similar investigation was conducted by a team from Pequannock Township, New Jersey. Neither turned up any evidence that the players were too old. Rolando Paulino, the league president, adamantly insisted that Almonte had been born on April 7, 1989. Paulino was initially backed by Little League and Dominican officials, who said the Baby Bombers had followed all proper procedures regarding age verification. Officials at Little League headquarters even took the unusual step of checking each of the player documents due to the rumors surrounding the team. Little League officials had increased scrutiny of player eligibility after the 1992 Series, in which the champions from Zamboanga City in the Philippines were stripped of their title due to a large number of out-of-district and overage players.

Reporters from Sports Illustrated went to the civil records building in Moca two weeks after the end of the 2001 Series. They discovered a notation in the birth ledger showing that in 1994, Felipe Almonte had registered his son's birth date as April 7, 1987, at Dr. Toribio Bencosme Hospital—which would have made him 14 years old at the time of the 2001 Series. It was common for Dominican parents to wait years before registering the birth of a child. Their report, posted on the magazine's website just before being published, triggered a full investigation by Little League, even as Almonte and his teammates were being feted in the Bronx. Almonte's mother, Sonia Rojas Breton, owned a handwritten birth certificate saying that he had been born at home in Jamao with the help of a midwife in 1989. She had registered Danny's 1989 birth date in 2000.

Both of Almonte's parents, though separated, insisted their son was born in 1989, condemning the other documents as false. Felipe Almonte appeared on Good Morning America at the time of the investigation, proclaiming his son's innocence.

=== Age disclosure ===
As part of Dominican officials' investigation, Victor Romero, head of the national public records office, interviewed the witnesses whose signatures appeared on the 1989 birth certificate. They both denied knowing Danny's parents, let alone signing the certificate. On August 31, Romero announced that Danny had been born in 1987.

As a result, Danny Almonte was retroactively declared ineligible, and the Baby Bombers had to forfeit all their wins in tournament play. All of their records were removed from the books, and the team was required to demonstrate compliance with all regulations before entering the 2002 tournament. Felipe was banned from Little League competition for life. Paulino was also banned, since Little League rules make the league president responsible for player eligibility. Dominican prosecutors filed criminal charges against Felipe for falsifying a birth certificate. Danny, who did not speak English at the time, apparently knew nothing about the falsified documents and was cleared of wrongdoing. Little League president Stephen Keener said that Danny and his teammates had been "used ... in a most contemptible and despicable way" and that "millions of Little Leaguers around the world were deceived." ESPN's Jim Caple called Felipe "the worst stereotype of the Little League parent sprung to life." Danny's godmother later begged forgiveness, saying that "we had to commit this little fraud" to give Danny a chance to compete in a tournament as significant as the Little League World Series.

New York City child welfare officials discovered that Danny had not attended school at all during the 18 months he'd been in the United States, a violation of state law and grounds for placing him in foster care. Felipe initially claimed he'd enrolled Danny in Public School 70 in the Bronx but admitted it to be false when there was no record of him ever attending. The lack of school enrollment would have made him ineligible for the Little League World Series even if he had actually been 12 years old. When asked by the New York Daily News what Danny had been doing during this time without any schooling, Felipe told the paper "He has been eating, and he has been playing ball."

In September 2001, Danny finally enrolled in school since arriving to America, taking bilingual 8th grade classes at Public School 52 in the Bronx.

== Subsequent baseball involvement ==
After his father's visa expired, Danny Almonte remained in New York under the guardianship of Rolando Paulino. He played, along with four of his former teammates, in the 2004 Public Schools Athletic League championship. In early 2005, Almonte moved to the Miami area, where he did not play baseball due to residency requirements. The following year he returned to New York, where he pitched for James Monroe High School in the Bronx.

Almonte attended a Major League Baseball (MLB) tryout in October 2006. There had been some reports that Almonte would be selected in the 2006 MLB draft, but that did not happen. After the draft, he said he would play baseball for New Mexico Junior College in Hobbs, New Mexico. The team made it to the National Junior College championship game in 2007. Later that year, Almonte joined the Southern Illinois Miners of the Frontier League, an independent minor-league circuit—and thus forfeited his NCAA collegiate eligibility. He pitched his first game on May 27, 2007, against the Evansville Otters. The Miners lost, 3–2. He was released on June 30, 2007. Almonte's record was 0–1, with a 5.29 earned run average (ERA) in six appearances. By at least one account, his poor performance was due to his being out of shape at the time.

In fall 2007, Almonte enrolled as a freshman in Western Oklahoma State College, a community college in Altus, Oklahoma, where he pitched and played right field for the Pioneers. Almonte and the Pioneers were ranked fourth in the National Junior College Athletic Association (NJCAA) Division 2 poll and advanced to the NJCAA D-2 World Series. Almonte finished as one of the top hitters in junior-college baseball, hitting for a .497 batting average with 14 home runs and going 7–1 with one save as a pitcher. In his second year at the school, Almonte had a .472 batting average with 18 home runs, and had a pitching record of 9–0. He was again not selected in the MLB draft.

Forced to give up pitching due to a sore arm, Almonte played semi-pro baseball in the summer of 2009 as an outfielder. As of 2010, Almonte had returned to the Bronx, where he was serving as a volunteer assistant coach for his high school alma mater's baseball team. Almonte indicated an intent to return to semi-pro baseball that summer, after the end of the school year, but said that he no longer held expectations of some day playing in MLB.

== Personal life ==
In May 2006, Almonte announced he was married to 30-year-old Rosy Perdomo. The wedding took place in 2005, when Almonte was 18.
