= 1959 Little League World Series =

Little League World Series held in 1959

Tournament details
- Dates: August 25–August 29
- Teams: 7

Final positions
- Champions: (United States) Hamtramck National Little League; Hamtramck, Michigan
- Runners-up: (United States) West Auburn Little League; Auburn, California

The 1959 Little League World Series took place from August 25 through August 29 in South Williamsport, Pennsylvania. The Hamtramck National Little League of Hamtramck, Michigan, defeated the West Auburn Little League of Auburn, California, in the championship game of the 13th Little League World Series (LLWS). Hamtramck became the first team from the United States to win a championship since foreign teams were allowed to participate beginning in 1957. Hamtramck became the first team from Michigan to win the LLWS; the next Michigan champion was Taylor North in the 2021 edition.

This was the first year that the LLWS was played at Howard J. Lamade Stadium in South Williamsport. Two-time defending champion Monterrey, Mexico, was ruled ineligible to compete due to violations of player residency requirements.

== Teams ==
States and Provinces represented at the 1959 Little League World Series

United States	International
(Michigan) Hamtramck, Michigan; North Region; Hamtramck National Little League	Valleyfield, Quebec; Canada Region; Valleyfield Little League
(New York (state)) Schenectady, New York; East Region; Schenectady National Little League	(West Germany) Bad Kissingen, West Germany; Europe Region; Bad Kissingen Army Base†
(Alabama) Gadsden, Alabama; South Region; National League of Gadsden	(Hawaii) Oahu, Hawaii; Pacific Region; Windward Little League
(California) Auburn, California; West region West Auburn Little League	(Puerto Rico) San Juan, Puerto Rico; Latin America Region; Caparra Little League

† The European qualifier, from Bad Kissingen Airfield West Germany, was unable to travel to the tournament.

== Championship bracket ==
Quarter-finals
August 25
(New York (state)) New York	7
Canada	2
August 26
California	3
Alabama	1
August 25
Puerto Rico	0
Michigan	5
August 26
Hawaii
Bye

Semi-finals
August 27
(New York (state)) New York	1
California	8
August 27
Michigan	7
Hawaii	1

Final
August 29
California	0
Michigan	12
Third place
August 28
(New York (state)) New York	1
Hawaii	0

1959 Little League World Series Champions
Hamtramck National Little League
Hamtramck, Michigan
