= Perfect game =

Perfect game may refer to:

== Sports ==
- Perfect game (baseball), a complete-game win by a pitcher allowing no baserunners
- Perfect game (bowling), a 300 game, 12 consecutive strikes in the same game
- Perfect Game Collegiate Baseball League, New York

== Film and television ==
- Perfect Game (2000 film), an American baseball comedy television film
- Inteqam: The Perfect Game, a 2004 Indian film
- The Perfect Game, a 2009 American baseball drama film
- Perfect Game (2011 film), a South Korean baseball film
- "Perfect Game" (Attack on Titan), a television episode
- "The Perfect Game" (Arthur), a television episode
- "The Perfect Game" (Daredevil), a television episode

== Music ==
- "Perfect Game" (song), by Thompson Twins, 1981
- Perfect Game Recording Co., an American record label

== See also ==
- Golden set, a tennis term
- Maximum break, a snooker term
- Nine-dart finish, a perfect game of darts
- Perfect score (disambiguation)
- Perfect Match (disambiguation)
- Perfect play
- List of NFL quarterbacks who have posted a perfect passer rating
