= Perfect Match =

Perfect Match may refer to:

- Perfect Match (TV series), a 2023 Netflix original TV series
- Perfect Match (American game show), a game show where married couples tried to answer their spouse's questions to win money
- Perfect Match (Australian game show)
- Perfect Match (British game show)
- Perfect Match (1994 game show), a 1994 ESPN game show, with questions based on sports figures
- Perfect Match (2025 TV series), a 2025 Chinese Hunan TV drama directed by Yu Zheng
- Perfect Match (novel), a 2002 novel by Jodi Picoult
- Perfect Match (1989 film), a 1989 Hong Kong film
- perfectmatch.com, a dating website
- "Perfect Match", a song by Dev from the album The Night the Sun Came Up

The Perfect Match may refer to:

- The Perfect Match, a 1936 Hong Kong film directed by Tang Xiaodan
- The Perfect Match, a 1982 Hong Kong film directed by Frankie Chan
- The Perfect Match (1988 film), an American film starring Marc McClure
- The Perfect Match (1991 film), a Hong Kong film directed by Stephen Shin
- The Perfect Match (1995 film), a British film directed by Nick Hurran
- The Perfect Match, a 2012 short story by Ken Liu
- The Perfect Match (2016 film), an American film directed by Bille Woodruff
- The Perfect Match (TV series), a Taiwanese romantic comedy series
- Manpasand - The Perfect Match, a 2007 Indian short animated film by Dhvani Desai

A Perfect Match may refer to:

- A Perfect Match (1980 film), a 1980 television film starring Colleen Dewhurst and Charles Durning
- A Perfect Match (film), a 2007 Belgian film
- A Perfect Match (David Houston and Barbara Mandrell album), 1972
- A Perfect Match (George Shearing and Ernestine Anderson album), 1988
- A Perfect Match (Ella Fitzgerald album), 1979
- "A Perfect Match" (song), a 2003 song by the A-Teens from their album New Arrival

== See also ==
- Perfect game (disambiguation)
