= The Perfect Game =

- Theatrical release poster
- Directed by: William Dear
- Written by: W. William Winokur
- Produced by: David Salzberg; Mark W. Koch; Christian Tureaud; Jason French; Carlos Bremer
- Starring: Clifton Collins Jr.; Cheech Marin; Emilie de Ravin; Jake T. Austin; Moises Arias; Jansen Panettiere; Ryan Ochoa; Louis Gossett Jr.; Bruce McGill
- Cinematography: Bryan F. Greenberg
- Edited by: Chris Conlee
- Music by: Bill Conti
- Production companies: Prelude Pictures; Lone Runner Entertainment; High Road Entertainment
- Distributed by: Lionsgate; Image Entertainment
- Release dates: March 21, 2009 (Guadalajara); April 16, 2010 (United States)
- Running time: 118 minutes
- Country: United States
- Language: English
- Budget: $12.5 million
- Box office: $3.8 million

The Perfect Game is a 2009 American drama film directed by William Dear, based on the 2008 book of the same name written by W. William Winokur. The film is based on the events leading to the 1957 Little League World Series, which was won by the first team from outside the United States, the Industrial Little League of Monterrey, Mexico, who defeated the heavily favored U.S. team. Mexican pitcher Ángel Macías threw the first, and so far only, perfect game in world championship game history.

== Plot ==
César Faz moves to Monterrey, Mexico, after he is let go by the St. Louis Cardinals from his job as a clubhouse attendant. There he meets local children being led by Padre Esteban, enjoying baseball; he takes pitcher Ángel Macías under his wing and brags about his own pitching skills and how he used to coach the Cardinals. Ángel convinces César to help recruit and coach Monterrey's first-ever Little League team. With César's skills and Padre Esteban's support, the boys hone themselves into a competitive team worthy of international competition. At the final game of the World Series of Little League, Monterrey defeats the team of West La Mesa, California, 4–0. Enrique Suárez hit a grand slam home run and Ángel Macías pitched a perfect game, a feat that has not been repeated in Little League World Series history.

When the team arrives in the United States, they are met with racism, a language barrier, and visa troubles. Though the underdogs, the team scores a series of victories that endear them to the media and new fans. They befriend a sports reporter, Frankie, and groundskeeper Cool Papa Bell, who then assist the boys in reaching the final game.

== Cast ==
Actor Jake T. Austin in 2008

- Clifton Collins Jr. as César Faz
- Cheech Marin as Padre Esteban
- Emilie de Ravin as Frankie
- Moisés Arias as Mario Ontiveros
- Jake T. Austin as Ángel Macías
- Ryan Ochoa as Norberto Villarreal
- Carlos Padilla Lenero as Baltazar Charles
- Gabriel Morales as Ricardo Treviño
- Jansen Panettiere as Enrique Suárez
- Mario Revolori as Gerardo Gonzalez
- Tony Revolori as Fidel Ruiz
- Alfredo Rodríguez as José "Pepe" Maiz
- Carlos Gómez as Umberto Macías
- Patricia Manterola as María
- John Cothran Jr. as Clarence Bell
- Wiiliam Marquez as Mexican Official #1
- David Koechner as Charlie
- Frances Fisher as Betty
- Tracey Walter as Police Officer #1
- Chris Mulkey as 'Lucky' Haskins
- Oliver Dear as Police Officer #2
- Louis Gossett Jr. as Cool Papa Bell
- Bruce McGill as Tanner
- Samantha Boscarino as Gloria
- Ernie Lively as Coach Sam Hicks
- William May as Juan
- Matt Battaglia as Coach McAllen
- Wyatt Smith as Jarrett
- Marc Musso as Tommy
- Riley Wells as Spectator at the Little League World Series

== Background ==
The film is based on a true story about a group of boys from Monterrey, Mexico, who became the first non-U.S. team to win the Little League World Series in 1957. Their team was Industriales de Monterrey, nicknamed "Los pequeños gigantes" (The little giants). Before traveling to the United States, the Little League team of the Industriales de Monterrey Baseball Club, played two seasons on the local 4 team Little League circuit before qualifying, as the second Little League team coming from outside of the United States and Canada; they participated in the southern area regional tournaments, which qualified them for the Little League World Series, held every August in South Williamsport, Pennsylvania.

The Industriales won all qualifying tournaments, to many rather unexpectedly, and advanced to the Little League World Series as the first Mexican team. There, they made it to the finals and defeated the highly favored team from La Mesa, California by a score of 4–0. The pitcher from Monterrey, Angel Macías, threw the first and only perfect game in championship history. The Industriales de Monterrey little league team was so dominant that year, that they were able to repeat their success in the following year in the 1958 Little League World Series.

== Production ==
The film was shot twice, with the majority of the cast returning for the second time. Filming took place in Monterrey for approximately a month. It was also shot in San Bernardino on a field that has hosted the Little League World Series.

The film scenes in Monterrey, which is the leading industrial center, one of the largest Mexican cities for over 100 years and a major center for science and research in Mexico, depicted the city as a two-burro village where the children played ball in the dirt choked streets with pigs and chickens serving as bases. The border between Mexico and Texas was portrayed as an out-in-the-middle-of-nowhere border crossing along a dirt road, instead of a bridge border-crossing over the Rio Grande. The digital work to recreate the separate looks for the United States and Monterrey in 1957 was done by Post Logic Studios.

== Reception ==
The film has received mixed reviews. Patrick Goldstein of the Los Angeles Times said he felt that "the film did a nice job of telling the story of the surprise upset when a youth ball team from Monterrey, Mexico, won the 1957 Little League World Series." He also commented that, "although the story seems like a fable, it reflected true events." He further expressed concern over Lionsgate's suspending the original release date. Ben Apatoff of MLB.com felt that the film was a strong family movie that appeals to baseball history buffs or any person who could relate to a child in love with the game. Roger Ebert wrote: "You sort of know how these underdog sports movies turn out. Doesn't matter. The Perfect Game so expertly uses the charisma and personalities of the actors, especially the young ones, that it's thrilling anyway."

A. O. Scott of At the Movies said, "[From] the second minute of the movie I knew every single thing that was going to happen and there was not a single surprise." Michael Phillips of the Chicago Tribune wrote, "The movie feels fraudulent, whether it's sticking to the historical record or going its own way with the customary composites and revisions and fabrications." On review aggregator Rotten Tomatoes, 60% of 42 reviews are positive, with an average rating of 5.5/10. The website's critics consensus reads, "It's bogged down with an unfocused script and countless sports movie cliches, but The Perfect Game still manages to charm with its unabashed sweetness and a stirring final act. " Metacritic, which uses a weighted average, assigned the film a score of 42 out of 100, based on 19 critics, indicating "mixed or average" reviews.

== Release ==
The film screened at the 2009 Guadalajara International Film Festival, with Eva Longoria invited to the preview. Louis Gossett Jr. was also in attendance for the premiere. The film was originally to be released in theaters on August 8, 2008, but it was bumped from that date, which Lionsgate said was due to marketing monies another party pledged but did not deliver.

== See also ==
- List of baseball films
