= 1987 Little League World Series =

Amateur baseball competition

Tournament details
- Dates: August 25–August 29
- Teams: 8

Final positions
- Champions: Hualien Little League; Hualien, Taiwan
- Runners-up: (United States) Northwood Little League; Irvine, California

The 1987 Little League World Series took place between August 25 and August 29 in South Williamsport, Pennsylvania. The Hualien Little League from Hualien, Taiwan, defeated the Northwood Little League of Irvine, California, in the championship game of the 41st Little League World Series. The 21 runs scored by Taiwan, and the winning margin of 20 runs, remain championship game records.

The Northwood team went on an 18-game winning streak to become the U.S. champions. They were the first team from Orange County, California, to play in the LLWS. In 2011, Ocean View Little League of Huntington Beach, California, became the first Orange County team to win the LLWS.

== Teams ==
United States	International
(Indiana) Chesterfield, Indiana; Central Region; Chesterfield Little League	Glace Bay, Nova Scotia; Canada Region; Glace Bay Little League
(New Hampshire) Dover, New Hampshire; East Region; Northside Little League	(Saudi Arabia) Dhahran, Saudi Arabia; Europe Region; Aramco Little League
(Tennessee) Morristown, Tennessee; South Region; American Little League	Hualien, Taiwan (Chinese Taipei); Far East Region; Hualien Little League
(California) Irvine, California; West Region; Northwood Little League	(Dominican Republic) Moca, Dominican Republic; Latin America Region; Rolando Paulino Little League

- Taiwan participates under the name Chinese Taipei in many sporting events, including Little League Baseball (LLB).
- The Rolando Paulino Little League of the Dominican Republic that competed in this tournament should not be confused with the Rolando Paulino Little League of The Bronx, New York City, which was involved in a player-eligibility controversy in the 2001 edition of the tournament.

== Championship bracket ==
Quarter-finals
August 25
Taiwan	7
Saudi Arabia	0
August 26
Canada	4
Dominican Republic	6
August 25
Indiana	4
Tennessee	1
August 26
California	13
New Hampshire	0

Semi-finals
August 27
Taiwan	4
Dominican Republic	0
August 27
Indiana	1
California	8

Final
August 29
Taiwan	21
California	1

- The third-place game was cancelled due to inclement weather; Dominican Republic and Indiana shared third place.

== Position bracket ==
Game A
August 26
Saudi Arabia	13
Tennessee	2

Game B
August 27
Canada	3
New Hampshire	1

- The last two games in the position bracket were cancelled due to inclement weather.

1987 Little League World Series Champions
Hualien Little League
Hualien, Taiwan
