= 1999 Little League World Series =

Children's baseball tournament

Tournament details
- Dates: August 22–August 28
- Teams: 8

Final positions
- Champions: (Osaka Prefecture) Hirakata Little League; Osaka, Japan
- Runners-up: (United States) National Little League; Phenix City, Alabama

The 1999 Little League World Series took place between August 22 and August 28 in South Williamsport, Pennsylvania. The Hirakata Little League of Hirakata, Osaka, Japan, defeated Phenix City National Little League of Phenix City, Alabama, in the championship game of the 53rd Little League World Series.

== Qualification ==
United States	International
(Indiana) Brownsburg, Indiana; Central; Brownsburg Little League	(Canada) (British Columbia) Victoria, British Columbia; Canada; Gordon Head Little League
(New Jersey) Toms River, New Jersey; East; Toms River Little League	(Germany) Ramstein Air Base, Germany; Europe; Ramstein American Little League
(Alabama) Phenix City, Alabama; South; National Little League	(Japan) Hirakata, Osaka; Far East; Hirakata Little League
(Idaho) Boise, Idaho; West; South Central Boise Little League	(Puerto Rico) Yabucoa, Puerto Rico; Latin America; Juan A. Biblioni Little League

- Puerto Rico an unincorporated territory of the United States.

== Pool play ==
United States
Region	Record
East	3–0
South	2–1
West	1–2
Central	0–3

International
Region	Record
Latin America	3–0
Far East	2–1
Canada	1–2
Europe	0–3

August 22

Canada	3–7	Far East
South	0–6	East

August 23

Canada	4–6	Latin America
South	5–4	Central
Europe	2–5	Far East
West	0–4	East

August 24

Latin America	3–1	Far East
Central	1–3	East
Europe	3–5	Canada
West	0–12 (5)	South

August 25

Latin America	16–3	Europe
West	2–0	Central

== Elimination round ==
Semi-finals
26 August
Yabucoa, Puerto Rico	2
Hirakata, Osaka, Japan	12
26 August (Game completed 27 August)
Toms River, New Jersey	2
Phenix City, Alabama	3

Final
28 August
(United States) Phenix City, Alabama	0
Hirakata, Osaka, Japan	5

1999 Little League World Series Champions
Hirakata Little League
Hirakata, Osaka, Japan

== Champions' path ==
The Hirakata LL reached the LLWS with an undefeated record of four wins and no losses. In total, their record was 9–1, their only loss coming against Juan A. Bablioni LL of Yabucoa, Puerto Rico.

Round	Opposition	Result
All-Japan Tournament
Opening Round	Suginami LL	4–3
Quarterfinals	Tokorozawa LL	5–0
Semifinals	Hiroshima Rijo LL	6–4
Japan Championship	Hyogo Harima LL	5–4

== Notable players ==
- Colby Rasmus (Phenix City, Alabama) Major League Baseball (MLB) outfielder
- Cory Rasmus (Phenix City, Alabama) MLB pitcher
- Michael Saunders (Victoria, British Columbia) MLB outfielder
- Lance Lynn (Brownsburg, Indiana) MLB pitcher
- Stephen Fife (Boise, Idaho) MLB pitcher
