= Perfect score (disambiguation) =

A perfect score is the best possible a score in a game or sport. Perfect score may also refer to:

- The Perfect Score, 2004 American film
- Perfect Score, American game show beginning in 2013
- Perfect 10 (gymnastics), highest score possible for a single routine in artistic gymnastics
- Perfect game (bowling), highest score possible in a game of bowling

== See also ==
- Perfect 10 (disambiguation)
- Perfect game
- Game score
