= Little League World Series (Central Region) =

Baseball competition

The Central Region was a region that competed in the Little League World Series between 1957 and 2000. It was inaugurated as the North Region in 1957, when the LLWS first gave out Series berths to regional winners. The region was renamed to Central in 1973, and in 2001 was split into the Midwest and Great Lakes regions. The region produced one world champion, in 1959, when Hamtramck, Michigan, defeated Auburn, California, 12–0, in the championship game.

The region consisted of teams from the Dakotas, Illinois, Indiana, Iowa, Kansas, Michigan, Minnesota, Missouri, Nebraska, Oklahoma, Ohio, and Wisconsin. In 2000, Kentucky replaced Oklahoma in the region.

Little League Baseball expanded the LLWS to sixteen teams for the 2001 Little League World Series. The Central Region was split into the Midwest Region (the Dakotas, Iowa, Kansas, Minnesota, Missouri, and Nebraska) and the Great Lakes Region (Illinois, Indiana, Kentucky, Michigan, Ohio, and Wisconsin).

== Regional Champions (1957–2000) ==
The following table indicates the Central Region champion and its LLWS performance in each year between 1957 and 2000.

| Year | Champion | City | LLWS | Record |
|---|---|---|---|---|
| 1957 | Jaycee LL | Escanaba, Michigan | Fourth Place | 0–2 |
| 1958 | Jaycee LL | Kankakee, Illinois | Runner-Up | 2–1 |
| 1959 | Hamtramck National LL | Hamtramck, Michigan | Champions | 3–0 |
| 1960 | New Boston Kiwanis LL | New Boston, Ohio | Seventh Place | 1–2 |
| 1961 | American LL | Terre Haute, Indiana | Fifth Place | 2–1 |
| 1962 | Central LL | Kankakee, Illinois | Runner-Up | 2–1 |
| 1963 | Central LL | Duluth, Minnesota | Third Place | 2–1 |
| 1964 | National LL | Bartlesville, Oklahoma | Fifth Place | 2–1 |
| 1965 | George Rogers Clark LL | Jeffersonville, Indiana | Fourth Place | 1–2 |
| 1966 | Jaycee LL | Kankakee, Illinois | Fifth Place | 2–1 |
| 1967 | North Roseland LL | Chicago, Illinois | Runner-Up | 2–1 |
| 1968 | American LL | Terre Haute, Indiana | Fifth Place | 2–1 |
| 1969 | West LL | Elyria, Ohio | Third Place (tie) | 1–1 |
| 1970 | South LL | Highland, Indiana | Fourth Place | 1–2 |
| 1971 | Anderson LL | Gary, Indiana | Runner-Up | 2–1 |
| 1972 | Edison LL | Hammond, Indiana | Runner-Up | 2–1 |
| 1973 | Federal LL | Birmingham, Michigan | Fourth Place | 1–2 |
| 1974 | Tallmadge LL | Tallmadge, Ohio | Fourth Place | 1–2 |
| 1975 | American LL | Davenport, Iowa | Third Place | 1–1 |
| 1976 | Windsor LL | Des Moines, Iowa | Eighth Place | 0–3 |
| 1977 | Midget Boosters LL | Youngstown, Ohio | Sixth Place | 1–2 |
| 1978 | South LL | Palatine, Illinois | Seventh Place | 1–2 |
| 1979 | National LL | Grosse Pointe Woods, Michigan | Eighth Place | 0–3 |
| 1980 | Grandview National LL | Des Moines, Iowa | Fifth Place | 2–1 |
| 1981 | Barrington LL | Barrington, Illinois | Third Place | 2–1 |
| 1982 | Pinery Park LL | Wyoming, Michigan | Third Place | 2–1 |
| 1983 | Jackie Robinson West LL | Chicago, Illinois | Fifth Place | 2–1 |
| 1984 | Southport LL | Southport, Indiana | Third Place | 2–1 |
| 1985 | East Tonka LL | Minnetonka, Minnesota | Sixth Place | 1–2 |
| 1986 | Norridge LL | Norridge, Illinois | Fifth Place | 2–1 |
| 1987 | Chesterfield LL | Chesterfield, Indiana | Third Place (tie) | 1–1 |
| 1988 | Tulsa LL | Tulsa, Oklahoma | Eighth Place | 0–3 |
| 1989 | East LL | Davenport, Iowa | Seventh Place | 1–2 |
| 1990 | Columbia LL | Brooklyn, Michigan | Seventh Place (tie) | 0–2 |
| 1991 | Westside American LL | Hamilton, Ohio | Seventh Place | 1–2 |
| 1992 | South Holland LL | South Holland, Illinois | Group Stage | 0–3 |
| 1993 | Westside American LL | Hamilton, Ohio | Group Stage | 1–2 |
| 1994 | American LL | Brooklyn Center, Minnesota | Group Stage | 1–2 |
| 1995 | Little Lakes West LL | Arden Hills, Minnesota | Group Stage | 1–2 |
| 1996 | National LL | Marshalltown, Iowa | Group Stage | 1–2 |
| 1997 | Dyer LL | Dyer, Indiana | Group Stage | 0–3 |
| 1998 | Jenison LL | Jenison, Michigan | Group Stage | 0–3 |
| 1999 | Brownsburg LL | Brownsburg, Indiana | Group Stage | 0–3 |
| 2000 | East LL | Davenport, Iowa | Third Place (tie) | 2–2 |

== Results by State ==
| Country | Central Region Championships | LLWS Championships | Record in LLWS | PCT |
|---|---|---|---|---|
| Indiana | 10 | 0 | 13–16 | .448 |
| Illinois | 9 | 0 | 15–12 | .556 |
| Michigan | 7 | 1 | 6–13 | .316 |
| Iowa | 6 | 0 | 7–11 | .389 |
| Ohio | 6 | 0 | 6–11 | .353 |
| Minnesota | 4 | 0 | 5–7 | .417 |
| Oklahoma | 2 | 0 | 2–4 | .333 |
| Total | 44 | 1 | 54–74 | .422 |

== See also ==
- Little League World Series (Great Lakes Region)
- Little League World Series (Midwest Region)
