= Little League World Series (East Region) =

Baseball competition region

The East Region was a region that competed in the Little League World Series between 1957 and 2000, until it was split into the Mid-Atlantic and New England regions in 2001.

The East Region was inaugurated in 1957 when the LLWS first gave out Series berths to Regional winners. The Region initially consisted of teams from Connecticut, Maine, Massachusetts, New Hampshire, New Jersey, New York, Pennsylvania, Rhode Island, Vermont, and two Canadian provinces (Ontario and Quebec). A year later, in 1958, the Canada Region was created and given its own automatic berth In the LLWS. Puerto Rico briefly competed in the East Region, from 1963 through 1967, before moving to the Latin American region. Delaware and Maryland moved to the East Region in 1968; Washington D.C., was given its own spot in the region in 1998.

Little League Baseball expanded the LLWS to sixteen teams for the 2001 Little League World Series. The East Region was split into the Mid-Atlantic Region (Delaware, Maryland, New Jersey, New York, Pennsylvania, and Washington D.C.) and the New England Region (Connecticut, Maine, Massachusetts, New Hampshire, Rhode Island, and Vermont).

== Champions 1957-2000 in the East Region ==
The following table indicates the East Region champion and its LLWS performance in each year between 1957 and 2000.

Year	Champion	City	LLWS	Record
1957	North End LL	Bridgeport, Connecticut	Third Place	1–1
1958	Darien LL	Darien, Connecticut	Fourth Place	1–2
1959	Schenectady National LL	(New York (state)) Schenectady, New York	Third Place	2–1
1960	Levittown American LL	Levittown, Pennsylvania	Champions	3–0
1961	Levittown American LL	Levittown, Pennsylvania	Sixth Place	1–2
1962	Pitman LL	Pitman, New Jersey	Third Place	2–1
1963	Stratford LL	Stratford, Connecticut	Runner-Up	2–1
1964	Mid-Island LL	(New York (state)) Staten Island, New York	Champions	3–0
1965	Windsor Locks LL	Windsor Locks, Connecticut	Champions	3–0
1966	West New York American LL	West New York, New Jersey	Runner-Up	2–1
1967	Newtown-Edgemont LL	Newtown Square, Pennsylvania	Third Place	2–1
1968	Hagerstown National LL	Hagerstown, Maryland	Sixth Place	1–2
1969	Newberry LL	Williamsport, Pennsylvania	Fifth Place	2–1
1970	Wayne American LL	Wayne, New Jersey	Champions	3–0
1971	Augusta East LL	Augusta, Maine	Sixth Place	1–2
1972	New City LL	(New York (state)) New City, New York	Fifth Place	2–1
1973	Colonie LL	(New York (state)) Colonie, New York	Eighth Place	0–3
1974	Pop Smith LL	New Haven, Connecticut	Sixth Place	1–2
1975	Lakewood LL	Lakewood, New Jersey	Champions	2–0
1976	Forestville LL	Bristol, Connecticut	Fifth Place	2–1
1977	Carman LL	(New York (state)) Rotterdam, New York	Third Place	2–1
1978	Rockville Centre American LL	(New York (state)) Rockville Centre, New York	Sixth Place	1–2
1979	Ridgewood National LL	Ridgewood, New Jersey	Seventh Place	1–2
1980	Darlington American LL	Pawtucket, Rhode Island	Seventh Place	1–2
1981	Stamford Federal LL	Stamford, Connecticut	Sixth Place	1–2
1982	Easton LL	Easton, Maryland	Eighth Place	0–3
1983	Stamford American LL	Stamford, Connecticut	Fourth Place	1–2
1984	McCabe-Waters LL	Bristol, Connecticut	Eighth Place	0–3
1985	South Shore LL	(New York (state)) Staten Island, New York	Seventh Place	1–2
1986	Brunswick LL	Brunswick, Maryland	Seventh Place	1–2
1987	Dover North LL	Dover, New Hampshire	Seventh Place (tie)	0–2
1988	Andover National LL	Andover, Massachusetts	Sixth Place	1–2
1989	Trumbull National LL	Trumbull, Connecticut	Champions	3–0
1990	Shippensburg LL	Shippensburg, Pennsylvania	Runner-Up	2–1
1991	South Shore American LL	(New York (state)) Staten Island, New York	Third Place	2–1
1992	Nottingham LL	Hamilton Square, New Jersey	Third Place (tie)	2–2
1993	Bedford LL	Bedford, New Hampshire	Third Place (tie)	2–2
1994	Middleborough LL	Middleborough, Massachusetts	5th Place	1–2
1995	Toms River East American LL	Toms River, New Jersey	5th Place	1–2
1996	Cranston Western LL	Cranston, Rhode Island	Runner-Up	2–3
1997	Railway Park LL	Pottsville, Pennsylvania	6th Place	1–2
1998	Toms River East American LL	Toms River, New Jersey	Champions	5–0
1999	Toms River East American LL	Toms River, New Jersey	Third Place (tie)	3–1
2000	Goffstown LL	Goffstown, New Hampshire	8th Place	0–3

== Results by State ==
Country	East Region Championships	LLWS Region Championships	Record in LLWS	PCT
Connecticut	10	2	15–14	.517
New Jersey	9	3	21–9	.700
(New York (state)) New York	8	1	13–11	.542
Pennsylvania	6	1	11–7	.611
Maryland	3	0	2–7	.222
New Hampshire	3	0	2–7	.222
Rhode Island	2	0	3–5	.375
Massachusetts	2	0	2–4	.333
Maine	1	0	1–2	.333
Total	44	7	70–66	.515

== See also ==
- Little League World Series (Mid-Atlantic Region)
- Little League World Series (New England Region)
