= 1998 Little League World Series =

Children's baseball tournament

Tournament details
- Dates: August 23–August 29
- Teams: 8

Final positions
- Champions: (United States) Toms River, New Jersey
- Runners-up: (Ibaraki Prefecture) Kashima, Ibaraki, Japan

The 1998 Little League World Series took place from August 23–29 in South Williamsport, Pennsylvania. Toms River, New Jersey, defeated Kashima, Ibaraki, Japan in the championship game of the 52nd Little League World Series. The title game was punctuated by a standout performance by future Major League Baseball (MLB) player and Home Run Derby champion Todd Frazier, who went 4-for-4 with a lead-off home run, and was also the winning pitcher.

== Teams ==
United States		International	
Region	Team	Region	Team
Central	(Michigan) Jenison, Michigan; Georgetown National Little League	Canada	(Canada) (British Columbia) Langley, British Columbia; Langley Little League
East	(New Jersey) Toms River, New Jersey; Toms River East American Little League	Europe	(Saudi Arabia) Dhahran, Saudi Arabia; Arabian American Little League
South	(North Carolina) Greenville, North Carolina; Tar Heel Little League	Far East	(Japan) (Ibaraki Prefecture) Kashima, Ibaraki, Japan; Kashima Little League
West	(California) Cypress, California; Cypress Little League	Latin America	(Mexico) Guadalupe, Nuevo León, Mexico; Guadalupe Linda Vista Little League

== Pool play ==
=== Standings ===
United States
Region	Team	Record
East	New Jersey	3–0
South	North Carolina	2–1
West	California	1–2
Central	Michigan	0–3

International
Region	Team	Record
Canada	Canada	3–0
Far East	Japan	2–1
Europe	Saudi Arabia	1–2
Latin America	Mexico	0–3

=== Results ===
August 23
Mexico	1–6	Japan
Michigan	9–13 (11 innings)	New Jersey

August 24
Mexico	3–4	Canada
Michigan	1–3	North Carolina
Saudi Arabia	3–10	Japan
California	2–4	New Jersey

August 25
Canada	10–5	Japan
North Carolina	3–5	New Jersey
Saudi Arabia	8–7	Mexico
California	4–1	Michigan

August 26
Canada	9–3	Saudi Arabia
California	4–6	North Carolina

== Elimination round ==
Semi-finals
27 August – International Championship
Japan	3
Canada	2
27 August – U.S. Championship
New Jersey	5
North Carolina	2

Final
29 August – World Championship
Japan	9
New Jersey	12

1998 Little League World Series Champions
Toms River East American Little League
Toms River, New Jersey

== Notable players ==
- Todd Frazier (Toms River, New Jersey) was drafted 34th overall by the Cincinnati Reds in the 2007 MLB draft and played in 11 MLB seasons as an infielder for the Reds, Chicago White Sox, New York Yankees, New York Mets, Texas Rangers and Pittsburgh Pirates. 2015 Home Run Derby champion, 2-time All-Star (2014 and 2015) and 2020 Olympic silver medalist.
- Jordan Lennerton (Langley, British Columbia) played first base in the Detroit Tigers and Atlanta Braves organizations. Won the CWS title with Oregon State in 2007.

== Champions' path ==
The Toms River East American LL lost five games before reaching the LLWS, losing once each in district, section, and state tournaments and twice in the East Region tournament.

Round	Opposition	Result
New Jersey District 18 Tournament
results unavailable
New Jersey Section 3 Tournament
Opening Round	(New Jersey) North Wall LL	9–1
Winners' Bracket Semifinals	(New Jersey) Woodbridge LL	4–1
Winners' Bracket Final	(New Jersey) HTRBA LL	3–4 (9 inn.)
Losers' Bracket Final	(New Jersey) Woodbridge LL	15–3
Championship	(New Jersey) HTRBA LL	17–3 (4 inn.)
Championship	(New Jersey) HTRBA LL	4–3
New Jersey State Tournament
Opening Round	(New Jersey) Cherry Hill National LL	4–2 (7 inn.)
Winners' Bracket Final	(New Jersey) Randolph LL	13–7
Championship	(New Jersey) Randolph LL	2–3
Championship	(New Jersey) Randolph LL	7–4
East Regional
Group Stage	(New York (state)) South Shore American LL	0–1
Group Stage	(Rhode Island) Cranston Western LL	6–2
Group Stage	(New Hampshire) Goffstown LL	11–4
Group Stage	(Rhode Island) Cranston Western LL	7–1
Group Stage	(Vermont) Brattleboro LL	2–5
Semifinals	(Connecticut) Simsbury National LL	1–0
Championship	(Delaware) Georgetown LL	2–0
Little League World Series
Group Stage	(Michigan) Georgetown National LL	13–9 (11 inn.)
Group Stage	(California) Cypress LL	4–2
Group Stage	(North Carolina) Tar Heel LL	5–3
U.S. Championship	(North Carolina) Tar Heel LL	5–2
World Championship	(Japan) (Ibaraki Prefecture) Kashima LL	12–9
