= Little League World Series (South Region) =

Children's baseball tournament

The South Region was a region that competed in the Little League World Series between 1957 and 2000 until it was split into the Southwest and Southeast regions in 2001.

The South Region was inaugurated in 1957. The Region originally consisted of teams from Alabama, Arkansas, Delaware, Florida, Georgia, Louisiana, Maryland, Mississippi, North Carolina, Oklahoma, South Carolina, Tennessee, Texas, Virginia, and West Virginia. In 1957, the Industrial Little League of Monterrey, Mexico won the South Region championship before Latin America was given its own berth starting with the 1958 LLWS. In 1968, Delaware and Maryland moved to the East Region. In 2000, Oklahoma replaced Kentucky in the region for one year before the region split into two. The tournament was held in Saint Petersburg, Florida each year between 1972 and 2000.

Little League Baseball expanded the LLWS to sixteen teams for the 2001 Little League World Series. The South Region was split into the Southeast region – Alabama, Florida, Georgia, North Carolina, South Carolina, Tennessee, Virginia, and West Virginia – and the Southwest region – Arkansas, Louisiana, Mississippi, Oklahoma, Texas East, and Texas West, plus West Region teams Colorado and New Mexico.

== South Region champions (1957–2000) ==
The following table indicates the South Region champion and its LLWS performance in each year between 1957 and 2000.

Year	Champion	City	LLWS	Record
1957	Industrial LL	(Mexico) Monterrey, Nuevo León	Champions	2–0
1958	National League of Gadsden LL	Gadsden, Alabama	Third Place	1–1
1959	National League of Gadsden LL	Gadsden, Alabama	First Round	0–1
1960	North East Optimist Club LL	Fort Worth, Texas	Runner-Up	2–1
1961	El Campo LL	El Campo, Texas	Runner-Up	2–1
1962	Val Verde County LL	Del Rio, Texas	Fifth Place	2–1
1963	North Houston LL	North Houston, Texas	Fifth Place	1–1
1964	South Brookley LL	Mobile, Alabama	Third Place	2–1
1965	North Waco LL	Waco, Texas	Third Place	2–1
1966	Westbury American LL	Houston, Texas	Champions	3–0
1967	West Tampa LL	Tampa, Florida	Fifth Place (tie)	1–1
1968	Tuckahoe LL	Richmond, Virginia	Runner-Up	2–1
1969	West Tampa LL	Tampa, Florida	Third Place (tie)	1–1
1970	National Optimist LL	Nashville, Tennessee	Seventh Place	1–2
1971	Gardenside LL	Lexington, Kentucky	Eighth Place	0–3
1972	National LL	Vienna, Virginia	Seventh Place	1–2
1973	Belmont Heights LL	Tampa, Florida	Third Place	2–1
1974	American LL	Jackson, Tennessee	Fifth Place	2–1
1975	Belmont Heights LL	Tampa, Florida	Runner-Up	1–1
1976	Tuckahoe National LL	Richmond, Virginia	Third Place (tie)	1–1
1977	Hub City LL	Hattiesburg, Mississippi	Fifth Place	2–1
1978	South Lexington LL	Lexington, Kentucky	Third Place	2–1
1979	Burns Park LL	North Little Rock, Arkansas	Third Place	2–1
1980	Belmont Heights LL	Tampa, Florida	Runner-Up	2–1
1981	Belmont Heights LL	Tampa, Florida	Runner-Up	2–1
1982	American LL	Sarasota, Florida	Seventh Place	1–2
1983	East Marietta National LL	Marietta, Georgia	Champions	3–0
1984	National LL	Altamonte, Florida	Runner-Up	2–1
1985	American LL	Morristown, Tennessee	Third Place	2–1
1986	American LL	Sarasota, Florida	Third Place	2–1
1987	American LL	Morristown, Tennessee	Seventh Place (tie)	0–2
1988	Northwest 45 LL	Spring, Texas	Third Place	2–1
1989	Northside LL	Tampa, Florida	Fifth Place	2–1
1990	Cottage Hill LL	Mobile, Alabama	Fifth Place (tie)	1–1
1991	National LL	Dunedin, Florida	Sixth Place	1–2
1992	South Lake Charles LL	Lake Charles, Louisiana	Group Stage	1–2
1993	Tuckahoe American LL	Richmond, Virginia	Group Stage	0–3
1994	Central Springfield LL	Springfield, Virginia	Third Place (tie)	2–2
1995	Northwest 45 LL	Spring, Texas	Runner-Up	3–2
1996	R.L. Turner LL	Panama City, Florida	Third Place (tie)	3–1
1997	Manatee G.T. Bray East LL	Bradenton, Florida	Third Place (tie)	2–2
1998	Tar Heel LL	Greenville, North Carolina	Third Place (tie)	2–2
1999	National LL	Phenix City, Alabama	Runner-Up	3–2
2000	Bellaire LL	Bellaire, Texas	Runner-Up	3–2

== Results by State ==
Country	South Region Championships	LLWS Championships	Record in LLWS	PCT
Florida	13	0	22–16	.579
Texas	9	1	20–10	.667
Alabama	5	0	7–6	.538
Virginia	5	0	6–9	.400
Tennessee	4	0	5–6	.455
Kentucky	2	0	2–4	.333
Georgia	1	1	3–0	1.000
Mexico	1	1	2–0	1.000
Arkansas	1	0	2–1	.667
Mississippi	1	0	2–1	.667
North Carolina	1	0	2–2	.500
Louisiana	1	0	1–2	.333
Total	44	3	74–57	.565

== See also ==
- Little League World Series (Southeast Region)
- Little League World Series (Southwest Region)
