= Perfect 10 =

Perfect 10 may refer to:

- Perfect 10 (gymnastics), formerly the maximum possible score in the sport
- Perfect Ten (album), and its title song, by American record producer Mustard
- "Perfect 10" (song), by The Beautiful South
- The Perfect 10 (NFL film), a 2023 sports documentary film by Steve Trout
- Perfect 10 (film), a 2019 British film by Eva Riley
- Perfect 10 (magazine), adult website and former men's magazine
- Former name for 987FM, a Singaporean radio station
- "The Perfect 10", the nickname of Shawn Spears (born 1981 as Ronnie Arneill), Canadian professional wrestler

== See also ==
- Perfect score (disambiguation)
