= 1993 Little League World Series =

Children's baseball tournament

Tournament details
- Dates: August 23–August 28
- Teams: 8

Final positions
- Champions: (United States) Long Beach Little League; Long Beach, California
- Runners-up: David Doleguita Little League; David, Panama

The 1993 Little League World Series took place between August 23 and August 28 in South Williamsport, Pennsylvania. The United States was represented by the defending series champion and West Region winner, the Long Beach, California Little League. The Latin American Region winner, the David Doleguita Little League of David, Chiriqui, Panama, won the International Championship.

Long Beach defeated Panama, 3–2, in the championship game of the 47th Little League World Series and retained its world championship. Long Beach became the first American team to repeat as champion and joined the teams from Monterrey, Mexico (in 1957 and 1958) and Seoul, South Korea (in 1984 and 1985) as the only teams to do so. Since then, only the Pabao Little League of Willemstad, Curaçao, has had the opportunity to repeat; they won the 2004 title but lost the 2005 championship game.

== Regional disqualification ==
The Dominican winners of the Latin American series were disqualified for using players who failed residency and age requirements.

== Teams ==
United States	International
(Ohio) Hamilton, Ohio; Central Region; Westside American Little League	North Vancouver, British Columbia; Canada Region; Lynn Valley Little League
(New Hampshire) Bedford, New Hampshire; East Region; Bedford Little League	(Germany) Kaiserslautern, Germany; Europe Region; Kaiserslautern Little League
(Virginia) Richmond, Virginia; South Region; Tuckahoe American Little League	(Northern Mariana Islands) Garapan, Saipan; Far East Region; CNMI Little League
(California) Long Beach, California; West Region; Long Beach Little League	(Panama) David, Panama; Latin America Region; David Doleguita Little League

- Saipan is the largest island of the Northern Mariana Islands, an unincorporated territory of the United States.

== Pool play ==
United States
Rank	State	Record
1	California	3–0
2	New Hampshire	2–1
3	Ohio	1–2
4	Virginia	0–3

International
Rank	Country	Record
1	Germany	2–1
2	Panama	2–1
3	(Northern Mariana Islands) Saipan	1–2
4	Canada	1–2

Pool	Team 1	Score	Team 2	Score
August 23
US	Virginia	0	New Hampshire	1
INT	Canada	0	Panama	6
INT	Germany	7	(Northern Mariana Islands) Saipan	3
US	California	8	Ohio	0
August 24
INT	(Northern Mariana Islands) Saipan	1	Panama	4
US	California (F/7)	12	Virginia	8
US	Ohio	0	New Hampshire	1
INT	Canada	8	Germany	1
August 25
US	California	21	New Hampshire	2
INT	Canada	3	(Northern Mariana Islands) Saipan	4
INT	Germany	5	Panama	1
US	Ohio	1	Virginia	0

== Elimination round ==
Semi-finals
August 26
Germany	0
Panama	5
August 26
California	11
New Hampshire	0

Final
August 28
Panama	2
California	3

1993 Little League World Series Champions
Long Beach Little League
Long Beach, California

== Notable players ==
- Sean Burroughs (Long Beach, California) - MLB player from 2002 to 2012

== Champions path ==
The Long Beach LL won 15 matches and lost only one match to reach the LLWS. In total their record was 20-1, their only loss coming against Thousand Oaks LL (from California).

Round	Opposition	Result
Section 4
Section 4 Winner's Bracket	(California) La Palma Continental LL	14–0
Section 4 Winner's Bracket	(California) Westminster LL	16–1
Section 4 Championship	(California) Puente Hills LL	1–0
South California Divisional
Winner's Bracket Opening Round	(California) Santana National LL	13–2
Winner's Bracket Semifinals	(California) Thousand Oaks LL	1–16
Loser's Bracket Quarterfinals	(California) South Mission Viejo LL	2–1
Loser's Bracket Semifinals	(California) West Covina American LL	6–2
Loser's Bracket Finals	(California) Thousand Oaks LL	5–1
South Championship	(California) Woodland Hills Sunrise LL	13–4
South Championship	(California) Woodland Hills Sunrise LL	14–5
West Regional
Round 1	(Arizona) Deer Valley LL	13–4
Quarterfinals	(Nevada) Spring Valley LL	3–0
Semifinals	(New Mexico) Noon Optimist LL	4–0
Finals	(California) San Ramon Valley LL	2–0
Finals	(California) Danville San Ramon Valley LL	5–2
