= Ben Hayes =

American baseball player (born 1957)

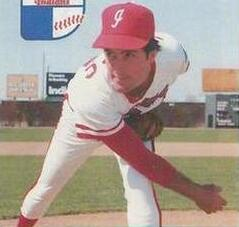
- Hayes with the Indianapolis Indians c. 1982
- Pitcher
- Born: August 4, 1957 (age 68); Niagara Falls, New York, U.S.
- Batted: Right Threw: Right

MLB debut
- June 25, 1982, for the Cincinnati Reds

Last MLB appearance
- October 2, 1983, for the Cincinnati Reds

MLB statistics
- Win–loss record: 6–6
- Earned run average: 4.70
- Strikeouts: 59
- Stats at Baseball Reference

Teams
- Cincinnati Reds (1982–1983)

Ben Joseph Hayes (born August 4, 1957) is an American former relief pitcher who played for the Cincinnati Reds both in 1982 and 1983.

In the 1970 Little League World Series, Hayes played for the Wiesbaden (Germany) team.

After his playing career ended, Hayes earned a Juris Doctor degree from the University of Florida. Hayes currently practices law in Florida and serves as President of the New York–Penn League.
