= Stephen Fife =

American baseball player (born 1986)

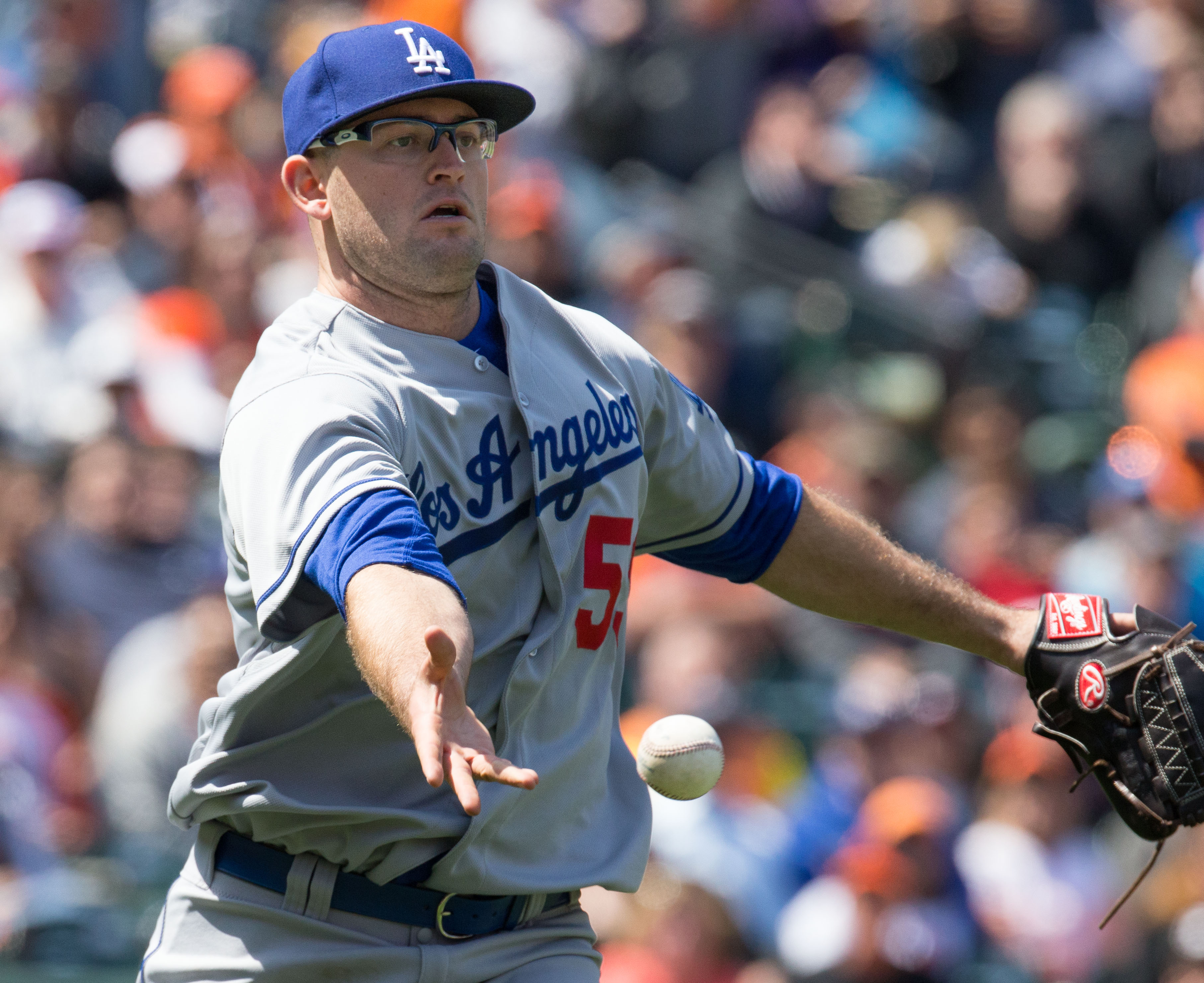
- Fife playing for the Los Angeles Dodgers in 2013
- Starting pitcher
- Born: October 4, 1986 (age 39); Boise, Idaho, U.S.
- Batted: Right Threw: Right

Professional debut
- MLB: July 17, 2012, for the Los Angeles Dodgers
- NPB: July 6, 2017, for the Saitama Seibu Lions

Last appearance
- MLB: May 4, 2014, for the Los Angeles Dodgers
- NPB: August 20, 2017, for the Saitama Seibu Lions

MLB statistics
- Win–loss record: 4–6
- Earned run average: 3.66
- Strikeouts: 70

NPB statistics
- Win–loss record: 1-1
- Earned run average: 6.86
- Strikeouts: 11
- Stats at Baseball Reference

Teams
- Los Angeles Dodgers (2012–2014); Saitama Seibu Lions (2017)

Stephen Joseph Fife (born October 4, 1986) is an American former professional baseball pitcher. He played for the Major League Baseball (MLB) for the Los Angeles Dodgers and in Nippon Professional Baseball (NPB) for the Saitama Seibu Lions.

== Early years ==
Born and raised in Boise, Idaho, Fife was a member of Idaho's first-ever team at the Little League World Series in 1999. He graduated from Borah High School in 2005, where he led the Lions to the 5A state title in his senior season, their first since 1981. Fife was also a member of the American Legion Boise Senators, winners of the state title (AA) in 2004. He attended Everett Community College north of Seattle and transferred to the University of Utah in Salt Lake City, where he was a Mountain West Conference All-Star for the Utes. Following his junior season, Fife was selected by the Boston Red Sox in the 3rd round of the 2008 Major League Baseball draft.

== Playing career ==
=== Boston Red Sox ===
Fife spent 2008 and 2009 in Single–A with the Lowell Spinners, Greenville Drive, and Salem Red Sox. In 2010, with the Double–A Portland Sea Dogs, he started 26 games and was 8-6 with a 4.75 ERA. Fife began 2011 with Portland, starting 18 games with an 11-4 record and 3.66 ERA.

=== Los Angeles Dodgers ===
On July 31, 2011, Fife was traded (along with Tim Federowicz) to the Los Angeles Dodgers in a three-team trade that sent Trayvon Robinson to the Seattle Mariners. In 6 starts with the Dodgers' Double–A affiliate, the Chattanooga Lookouts, he was 3-1 with a 4.01 ERA. He was added to the 40-man roster after the season to protect him from the Rule 5 draft and promoted to the Triple–A Albuquerque Isotopes to start 2012.

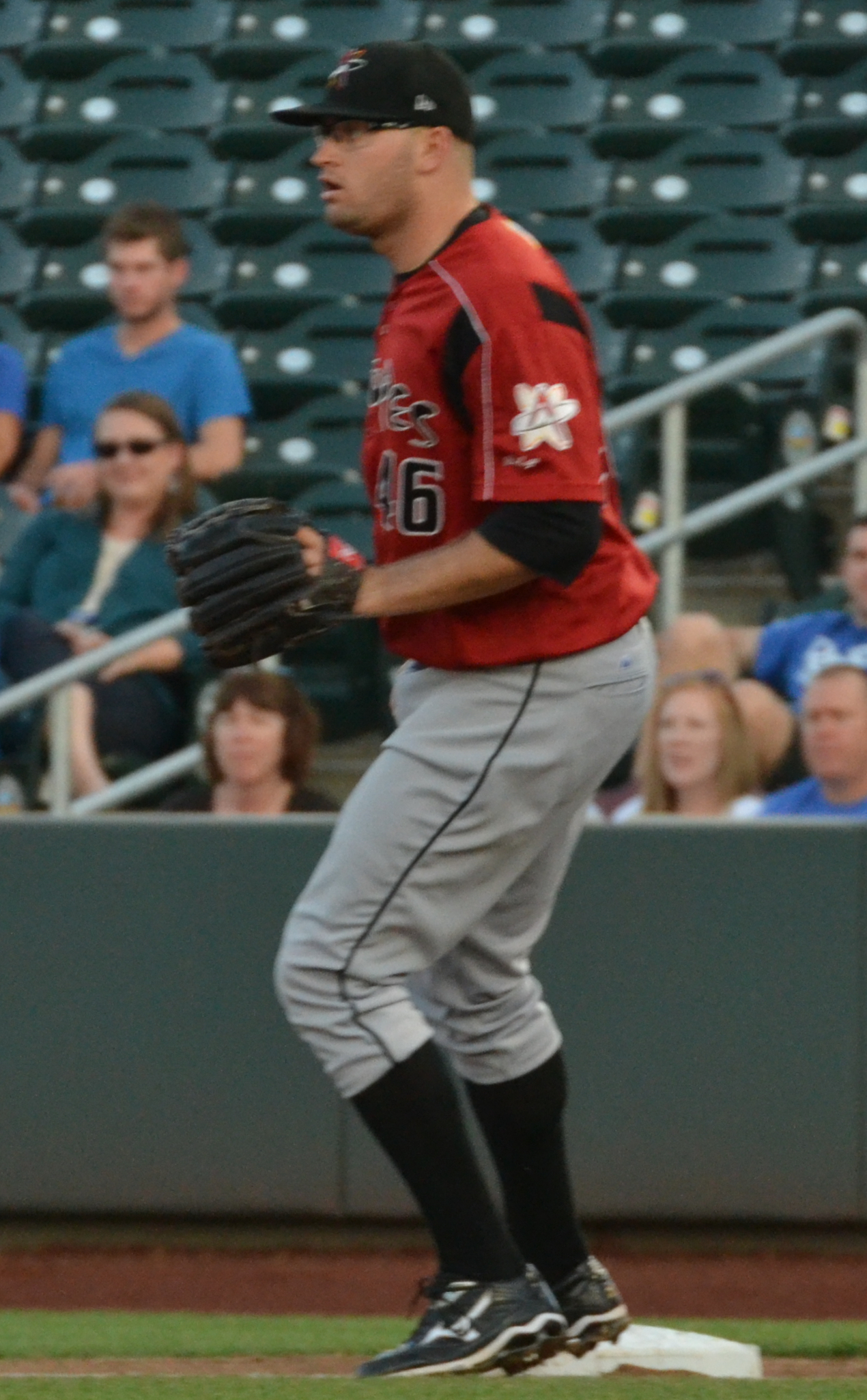
Fife during his tenure with the Albuquerque Isotopes, triple-A affiliates of the Los Angeles Dodgers, in 2012

Fife was called up to the majors for the first time on July 17, 2012 to make a spot start against the Philadelphia Phillies in place of the injured Chad Billingsley. He pitched six innings, allowing only one run while inducing 11 ground ball outs and left the game with the lead, only to get a no decision when the bullpen blew the game in the eighth. He was optioned back to the Isotopes after the game. After one start with the Isotopes, he returned to the Dodgers after Nathan Eovaldi was traded. He made two more starts with the Dodgers on July 27 and August 1 before returning to the minors after the team acquired Joe Blanton. In 24 starts (and 1 relief appearance) with the Isotopes, Fife was 11-7 with a 4.66 ERA. He was later recalled to the Dodgers in September and made two more starts. In his 5 total starts with the Dodgers in 2012, he was 0-2 with a 2.70 ERA.

Fife picked up his first career win on June 3, 2013, in a spot start against the San Diego Padres. He again split the season between Albuquerque and Los Angeles. With the Dodgers, he made 10 starts (and appeared in 2 games out of the bullpen) with a 4-4 record and 3.86 ERA.

In the 2014 season, he made one appearance for the Dodgers, starting a game on May 4 against the Miami Marlins. He allowed four runs in six innings in that game. He also started nine games for the Isotopes (and appeared in relief twice). He was 2-2 with a 7.01 ERA before going to the DL with a sore arm. On August 13, 2014, he underwent Tommy John surgery, ending his season. On October 13, 2014, he was outrighted to the minor leagues and removed from the 40 man roster.

=== Chicago Cubs ===
On December 11, 2015, the Chicago Cubs signed Fife to a minor league contract. Fife spent the 2016 season with the Triple–A Iowa Cubs, where he posted an 0-2 record with a 4.61 ERA and 25 strikeouts. He elected free agency following the season on November 7, 2016.

=== Miami Marlins ===
On December 13, 2016, Fife signed a minor league contract with the Miami Marlins. He made 12 starts for the Triple-A New Orleans Baby Cakes, logging a 4-3 record and 3.97 ERA with 52 strikeouts across 65 2/3 innings pitched. Fife was released by the Marlins organization on June 16, 2017.

=== Saitama Seibu Lions ===
On June 21, 2017, Fife signed with the Saitama Seibu Lions of Nippon Professional Baseball. In five starts for Seibu, Fife compiled a 1-1 record and 6.86 ERA with 11 strikeouts over 21 innings of work.

=== Cleveland Indians ===
On February 8, 2018, Fife signed a minor league contract with the Cleveland Indians organization. In 20 games (17 starts) for the Triple–A Columbus Clippers, he logged a 5–7 record and 6.80 ERA with 56 strikeouts across 86 innings of work. Fife elected free agency following the season on November 2.

== Scouting report ==
Fife is an extreme groundball pitcher throughout his minor league and major league career. Fife relies on a two-seam fastball, which he throws between 88–91 mph (142–146 km/h). He also throws a curveball at 76–79 mph (122–127 km/h) and a changeup at 79–81 mph (127–130 km/h).
