= 1996 Little League World Series =

Children's baseball tournament

Tournament details
- Dates: August 19–August 24
- Teams: 8

Final positions
- Champions: Fu-Hsing Little League; Kaohsiung, Taiwan
- Runners-up: (United States) Cranston Western Little League; Cranston, Rhode Island

The 1996 Little League World Series took place between August 19 and August 24 in South Williamsport, Pennsylvania. The Fu-Hsing Little League of Kaohsiung, Taiwan, defeated Cranston Western Little League of Cranston, Rhode Island, in the championship game of the 50th Little League World Series.

== Qualification ==
United States	International
(Iowa) Marshalltown, Iowa; Central Region; National Little League	Surrey, British Columbia; Canada Region; Kennedy-Surrey Little League
(Rhode Island) Cranston, Rhode Island; East Region; Cranston Western Little League	(Saudi Arabia) Dhahran, Saudi Arabia; Europe Region; Arabian American Little League
(Florida) Panama City, Florida; South Region; R.L. Turner Little League	Kaohsiung, Taiwan (Chinese Taipei); Far East Region; Fu-Hsing Little League
(California) Moorpark, California; West Region; Moorpark Little League	(Dominican Republic) San Isidro, Dominican Republic; Latin America Region; Ramón Matias Mella Little League

- Taiwan participates under the name Chinese Taipei in many sporting events, including Little League Baseball (LLB).

== Pool play ==
United States
Rank	State	Record
1	Florida	3–0
2	Rhode Island	1–2
3	California	1–2
4	Iowa	1–2

International
Rank	Country	Record
1	Taiwan	3–0
2	Dominican Republic	2–1
3	Canada	1–2
4	Saudi Arabia	0–3

Pool	Team 1	Score	Team 2	Score
August 19
INT	Dominican Republic	5	Canada	1
US	Iowa	3	Florida	6
INT	Taiwan	12	Saudi Arabia	3
US	Rhode Island	5	California	1
August 20
INT	Canada	3	Saudi Arabia	2
US	Iowa	3	California	7
INT	Dominican Republic	0	Taiwan	9
US	Florida	8	Rhode Island	6
August 23
INT	Dominican Republic (F/5)	13	Saudi Arabia	0
US	Rhode Island	1	Iowa	6
INT	Canada	2	Taiwan (F/4)	21
US	Florida	10	California	2

== Elimination round ==
Semi-finals
August 22
Rhode Island	6
Florida	3
August 22
Dominican Republic	1
Taiwan	7

Final
August 24
Rhode Island	3
Taiwan	13

1996 Little League World Series Champions
Fu-Shing Little League
Kaohsiung, Taiwan

== Notable players ==
- Jeff Clement (Marshalltown, Iowa) - Former MLB player
- Adam Loewen (Surrey, British Columbia) - Former MLB Player
- Clete Thomas (Panama City, Florida) - Former MLB player
