= 2000 Little League World Series =

Youth baseball competition event

Tournament details
- Dates: August 20–August 26
- Teams: 8

Final positions
- Champions: Sierra Maestra Little League; Maracaibo, Venezuela
- Runners-up: (United States) Bellaire Little League; Bellaire, Texas

The 2000 Little League World Series took place August 20 to August 26 in South Williamsport, Pennsylvania. The Sierra Maestra Little League of Maracaibo, Venezuela, defeated Bellaire Little League of Bellaire, Texas, in the championship game of the 54th Little League World Series.

== Qualification ==
United States	International
(Iowa) Davenport, Iowa; Central; Davenport East Little League	(Canada) (Ontario) Toronto, Ontario; Canada; High Park Little League
(New Hampshire) Goffstown, New Hampshire; East; Goffstown Little League	(Saudi Arabia) Dhahran, Saudi Arabia; Europe; Arabian-American Little League
(Texas) Bellaire, Texas; South; Bellaire Little League	(Japan) Tokyo, Japan; Far East; Musashi-Fuchu Little League
(Washington (state)) Vancouver, Washington; West; Hazel Dell Little League	(Venezuela) Maracaibo, Venezuela; Latin America; Sierra Maestra Little League

== Pool play ==
After three U.S. teams finished pool play with a 2–1 record, the team that had allowed the fewest runs per innings played (Bellaire) was declared the pool winner; Davenport was then named pool runner-up due to their win over Vancouver in head-to-head play.

=== Standings ===
United States
Region	City	Record	Runs	
Region	City	Record	Scored	Allowed
South	Bellaire, TX	2–1	7	7
Central	Davenport, IA	2–1	13	8
West	Vancouver, WA	2–1	15	10
East	Goffstown, NH	0–3	4	14

International
Region	City	Record
Far East	Tokyo	3–0
Latin America	Maracaibo	2–1
Europe	Dhahran	1–2
Canada	Toronto	0–3

=== Game results ===
August 20, 2000	Far East	10 – 0	Latin America

August 20, 2000	East	0 – 3	South

August 21, 2000	Canada	8 – 9	Far East

August 21, 2000	Central	5 – 0	East

August 21, 2000	Europe	0 – 3	Latin America

August 21, 2000	West	5 – 0	South

August 22, 2000	Canada	4 – 5	Latin America

August 22, 2000	East	4 – 6	West

August 22, 2000	Europe	0 – 9	Far East

August 22, 2000	South	4 – 2	Central

August 23, 2000	Canada	1 – 3	Europe

August 23, 2000	Central	6 – 4	West

== Elimination round ==
Semi-finals
24 August
Tokyo, Japan	4
Maracaibo, Venezuela	5
24 August
Davenport, Iowa	0
Bellaire, Texas	8

Final
26 August
Maracaibo. Venezuela	3
(United States) Bellaire, Texas	2

2000 Little League World Series Champions
Sierra Maestra Little League
Maracaibo, Venezuela

== Notable players ==
- Julian Vandervelde (Davenport, Iowa) NFL player
- Harry Zolnierczyk (Toronto, Ontario) NHL player
