= 1972 Little League World Series =

Children's baseball tournament

Tournament details
- Dates: August 22–August 26
- Teams: 8

Final positions
- Champions: Taipei Little League; Taipei City, Taiwan
- Runners-up: (United States) Hammond Edison Little League; Hammond, Indiana

The 1972 Little League World Series took place between August 22 and August 26 in South Williamsport, Pennsylvania. The Taipei Little League of Taipei City, Taiwan, defeated the Edison Little League of Hammond, Indiana, in the championship game of the 26th Little League World Series.

== Teams ==
| United States | International |
|---|---|
| (Indiana) Hammond, Indiana; North Region; Edison Little League | Windsor, Ontario; Canada Region; South Little League |
| (New York (state)) New City, New York; East Region; New City Little League | (Spain) Madrid, Spain; Europe Region; Torrejon Air Base Little League |
| (Virginia) Vienna, Virginia; South Region; National Little League | (Taiwan) Taipei City, Taiwan; Far East Region; Taipei Little League |
| (Hawaii) Pearl City, Hawaii; West Region; Community Little League | (Puerto Rico) San Juan, Puerto Rico; Latin America Region; Admiral Gallery Little League |

== Championship bracket ==
Quarter-finals
August 22
Puerto Rico | 3
Canada | 1
August 22 (F/7)
Virginia | 1
Indiana | 2
August 23
Taiwan | 9
(New York (state)) New York | 0
August 23
Hawaii | 11
Spain | 2

Semi-finals
August 24
Puerto Rico | 7
Indiana | 10
August 24
Taiwan | 9
Hawaii | 1

Final
August 26
Indiana | 0
Taiwan | 6
Third place
August 25
Puerto Rico | 5
Hawaii | 5

== Consolation bracket ==
Games A & B
August 23
Canada | 3
Virginia | 2
August 24
(New York (state)) New York | 8
Spain | 1

Game D
August 25
Canada | 0
(New York (state)) New York | 2
Game C
August 25
Virginia | 3
Spain | 0

1972 Little League World Series Champions
Taipei Little League
Taipei City, Taiwan
