= 1990 Little League World Series =

Amateur baseball competition

Tournament details
- Dates: August 21–August 26
- Teams: 8

Final positions
- Champions: San Hua Little League; Tainan, Taiwan
- Runners-up: (United States) Shippensburg Little League; Shippensburg, Pennsylvania

The 1990 Little League World Series took place between August 21 and August 26 in Williamsport, Pennsylvania. The San Hua Little League of Tainan, Taiwan, defeated the Shippensburg Little League of Shippensburg, Pennsylvania, in the championship game of the 44th Little League World Series. Excessive rain delays resulted in the championship game being rescheduled from August 25 to August 26 (a Sunday), with highlights broadcast on ESPN on tape delay.

== Teams ==
United States	International
(Michigan) Brooklyn, Michigan; Central Region; Columbia Little League	Trail, British Columbia; Canada Region; Trail Little League
(Pennsylvania) Shippensburg, Pennsylvania; East Region; Shippensburg Little League	(Germany) Ramstein Air Base, Germany; Europe Region; Falcon Little League
(Alabama) Mobile, Alabama; South Region; Cottage Hill Little League	Tainan, Taiwan (Chinese Taipei); Far East Region; San Hua Little League
(California) Cypress, California; West Region; Federal Little League	(Mexico) Matamoros, Tamaulipas, Mexico; Latin America Region; Matamoros Little League

- Taiwan participates under the name Chinese Taipei in many sporting events, including Little League Baseball (LLB).

== Championship bracket ==
Quarter-finals
August 21
Mexico	3
Canada	8
August 22
Germany	0
Taiwan	14
August 21
Michigan	0
California	9
August 22
Pennsylvania	3
Alabama	1

Semi-finals
August 25†
Canada	1
Taiwan	20
August 25†
California	4
Pennsylvania	5

Final
August 26‡
Taiwan	9
Pennsylvania	0
Third place
Canada	5
California	4

† The semi-final games were delayed two days, due to rain.
‡ The championship game was played on a Sunday for the first time in LLWS history, due prior game postponements due to rain.

== Position bracket ==
Game A
August 22
Mexico	5
Michigan	0

Game B
August 23
Alabama	3
Germany	1

1990 Little League World Series Champions
San Hua Little League
Tainan, Taiwan

== Notable players ==
- Jason Bay (Trail, British Columbia) – MLB outfielder from 2003 to 2013
- Chin-Feng Chen (Tainan, Taiwan) – MLB outfielder from 2002 to 2005 & in the CPBL from 2006 to 2016.
