= 1978 Little League World Series =

Children's baseball tournament

Tournament details
- Dates: August 22–August 26
- Teams: 8

Final positions
- Champions: Pinkuang Little League; Pingtung, Taiwan
- Runners-up: (United States) San Ramon Valley Little League; Danville, California

The 1978 Little League World Series took place between August 22 and August 26 in South Williamsport, Pennsylvania. The Pinkuang Little League of Pingtung, Taiwan, defeated the San Ramon Valley Little League of Danville, California, in the championship game of the 32nd Little League World Series.

== Teams ==
United States	International
(Illinois) Palatine, Illinois; Central Region; South Little League	Surrey, British Columbia; Canada Region; Whalley Little League
(New York (state)) Rockville Centre, New York; East Region; American Little League	(Spain) Madrid, Spain; Europe Region; Torrejón Air Base Little League
(Kentucky) Lexington, Kentucky; South Region; South Lexington Little League	(Taiwan) Pingtung, Taiwan; Far East Region; Pinkuang Little League
(California) Danville, California; West Region; San Ramon Valley Little League	(Dominican Republic) Santo Domingo, Dominican Republic; Latin America Region; LaJavilla Little League

== Championship bracket ==
Quarter-finals
August 22
(New York (state)) New York	1
California	4
August 23
Kentucky	7
Illinois	0
August 22
Spain	0
Dominican Republic	13
August 23
Canada	0
Taiwan	12

Semi-finals
August 24
California	6
Kentucky	5
August 24
Dominican Republic	0
Taiwan	3

Final
August 26
California	1
Taiwan	11
Third place
August 25
Kentucky	6
Dominican Republic	4

== Position bracket ==
Games A & B
August 23
(New York (state)) New York	12
Spain	0
August 24
Canada	5
Illinois	2

Game D
August 25
(New York (state)) New York	0
Canada	2
Game C
August 25
Spain	0
Illinois	2

1978 Little League World Series Champions
Pinkuang Little League
Pintung, Taiwan

== Notable players ==
- Erik Johnson of the San Ramon team went on to play in MLB as an infielder in 1993 and 1994.
- Dave Veres of the Torrejón Air Base team went on to play in MLB as pitcher between 1994 and 2003.
- Al Haynes was an umpire in the 1978 LLWS. He later became the hero pilot of the 1989 United Airlines Flight 232.
