= 1989 Little League World Series =

Amateur baseball competition

Tournament details
- Dates: August 22–August 26
- Teams: 8

Final positions
- Champions: (United States) National Little League; Trumbull, Connecticut
- Runners-up: Kang-Tu Little League; Kaohsiung, Taiwan

The 1989 Little League World Series took place between August 22 and August 26 in South Williamsport, Pennsylvania. The National Little League of Trumbull, Connecticut, defeated the Kang-Tu Little League of Kaohsiung, Taiwan, in the championship game of the 43rd Little League World Series.

== Teams ==
United States	International
(Iowa) Davenport, Iowa; Central Region; East Little League	Toronto, Ontario; Canada Region; High Park Little League
(Connecticut) Trumbull, Connecticut; East Region; National Little League	(Saudi Arabia) Dhahran, Saudi Arabia; Europe Region; Aramco Little League
(Florida) Tampa, Florida; South Region; Northside Little League	Kaohsiung, Taiwan (Chinese Taipei); Far East Region; Kang-Tu Little League
(California) San Pedro, California; West Region; Eastview Little League	(Venezuela) Maracaibo, Venezuela; Latin America Region; Coquivacoa Little League

- Taiwan participates under the name Chinese Taipei in many sporting events, including Little League Baseball (LLB).

== Championship bracket ==
Quarter-finals
August 22
Taiwan	9
Saudi Arabia	4
August 23
Venezuela	10
Canada	7
August 22
Iowa	3
Connecticut	4
August 23
California	12
Florida	5

Semi-finals
August 24
Taiwan	13
Venezuela	0
August 24
Connecticut	6
California	3

Final
August 26
Taiwan	2
Connecticut	5
Third place
August 25
Venezuela	10
California	1

== Position bracket ==
Games A & B
August 23
Saudi Arabia	5
Iowa	4
August 24 (F/7)
Florida	1
Canada	0

Game D
August 25
Saudi Arabia	3
Florida	8
Game C
August 25
Iowa	4
Canada	3

1989 Little League World Series Champions
Trumbull National Little League
Trumbull, Connecticut

== Notable players ==
- Kevin Cash (Tampa, Florida) – MLB catcher between 2002 and 2010, and MLB coach and manager
- Chris Drury (Trumbull, Connecticut) – NHL center from 1998 to 2011; inducted to the Little League Hall of Excellence in 2009.

== Champions path ==
The Trumbull National LL went 12–1 to reach the LLWS. In total, their record was 15–1.

Round	Opposition	Result
Connecticut District 2 Tournament
Round Robin	(Connecticut) Stratford National LL	23–0
	(Connecticut) Stratford American LL	15–3
	(Connecticut) Bridgeport North End East LL	19–1
	(Connecticut) Fairfield American LL	8–4
	(Connecticut) Bridgeport Park City American LL	0–2
Championship	(Connecticut) Bridgeport Park City American LL	7–0
Connecticut Division 1 State Tournament
Winner's Bracket Semifinals	(Connecticut) Forestville LL	4–0
Winner's Bracket Finals	(Connecticut) Hamden Ron Bernardini LL	17–2
Championship	(Connecticut) Forestville LL	11–6
East Regional
Opening Round	(Vermont) Swanton LL	17–3
Quarterfinals	(New Hampshire) Manchester South LL	1–0
Semifinals	(New Jersey) Cherry Hill American LL	18–6
East Region Championship	(Delaware) Wilmington Brandywine LL	15–5
