= San Isidro, Dominican Republic =

Coordinates: 18.5333°N 69.7667°W

San Isidro is a location in the Dominican Republic at the east of Santo Domingo, notable for the San Isidro Air Base, the San Isidro free zone and motels. Baseball player Welington Castillo is from there. It is located at 18.5333 latitude and -69.7667 longitude. It has an elevation of 39 feet.
