= 1991 Little League World Series =

Children's baseball tournament

Tournament details
- Dates: August 20–August 24
- Teams: 8

Final positions
- Champions: Hsi Nan Little League; Taichung, Taiwan
- Runners-up: (United States) San Ramon Valley Little League; Danville, California

The 1991 Little League World Series took place between August 20 and August 24 in South Williamsport, Pennsylvania. In the championship game of this 45th Little League World Series, the Hsi Nan Little League of Taichung, Taiwan, defeated the San Ramon Valley Little League of Danville, California.

== Teams ==
United States	International
(Ohio) Hamilton, Ohio; Central Region; Westside American Little League	Glace Bay, Nova Scotia; Canada Region; Glace Bay Little League
(New York (state)) Staten Island, New York; East Region; South Shore American Little League	(Saudi Arabia) Dhahran, Saudi Arabia; Europe Region; Arabian American Little League
(Florida) Dunedin, Florida; South Region; National Little League	Taichung, Taiwan (Chinese Taipei); Far East Region; Hsi Nan Little League
(California) Danville, California; West Region; San Ramon Valley Little League	(Dominican Republic) San Cristóbal, Dominican Republic; Latin America Region; Luis Montas Little League

- Taiwan participates under the name Chinese Taipei in many sporting events, including Little League Baseball (LLB).

== Championship bracket ==
Quarter-finals
August 20
Dominican Republic	2
Taiwan	3
August 21
Canada	5
Saudi Arabia	3
August 20
Ohio	0
(New York (state)) New York	8
August 21
Florida	4
California	5

Semi-finals
August 22
Taiwan	17
Canada	1
August 22
(New York (state)) New York	4
California	13

Final
August 24
Taiwan	11
California	0
Third place
August 23
Canada	0
(New York (state)) New York	16

== Position bracket ==
Games A & B
August 21
Dominican Republic	10
Ohio	0
August 22
Florida	23
Saudi Arabia	7

Game D
August 23
Dominican Republic	3
Florida	2
Game C
August 23
Ohio	5
Saudi Arabia	1

1991 Little League World Series Champions
Hsi Nan Little League
Taichung, Taiwan

== Notable players ==
- Michael Cammarata (Staten Island, New York) – New York City Fire Department firefighter, died during the September 11 attacks
- Ron DeSantis (Dunedin, Florida) – Governor of Florida, former member of the United States House of Representatives
- Lin Wei-chu (Taiwan) – Competed in the 2004 Summer Olympics and played for the Hanshin Tigers of Nippon Professional Baseball's Central League from 2003 to 2013
- Jason Marquis (Staten Island, New York) – MLB pitcher from 2000 to 2015
- Brian Esposito (Staten Island, New York) – MLB catcher in 2007 for the St. Louis Cardinals and 2010 for the Houston Astros
