= 1973 Little League World Series =

Children's baseball tournament

Tournament details
- Dates: August 21–August 25
- Teams: 8

Final positions
- Champions: Tainan City Little League; Tainan City, Taiwan
- Runners-up: (United States) Cactus Little League; Tucson, Arizona

The 1973 Little League World Series took place between August 21 and August 25 in South Williamsport, Pennsylvania. The Tainan City Little League of Tainan City, Taiwan, defeated the Cactus Little League of Tucson, Arizona, in the championship game of the 27th Little League World Series.

The champions from Taiwan did not allow a run or a hit in the entire tournament, registering no hitters in each of their three tournament games. That feat has yet to be equalled in any other Little League World Series.

== Teams ==
United States	International
(Michigan) Birmingham, Michigan; Central Region; Federal Little League	Surrey, British Columbia; Canada Region; Whalley Little League
(New York (state)) Colonie, New York; East Region; Colonie Little League	(Germany) Bitburg Air Base, West Germany; Europe Region; Bitburg Air Base Little League
(Florida) Tampa, Florida; South Region; Belmont Heights Little League	(Taiwan) Tainan City, Taiwan; Far East Region; Tainan City Little League
(Arizona) Tucson, Arizona; West Region; Cactus Little League	(Mexico) Monterrey, Nuevo León, Mexico; Latin America Region; Mitras Little League

== Winners bracket ==
Quarter-finals
August 21
Taiwan	18
Germany	0
August 21
Florida	11
Canada	2
August 22
Arizona	4
(New York (state)) New York	0
August 22
Michigan	8
Mexico	1

Semi-finals
August 23
Taiwan	27
Florida	0
August 23
Arizona	8
Michigan	1

Final
August 25
Taiwan	12
Arizona	0
Third place
August 24 (F/7)
Florida	2
Michigan	1

== Consolation bracket ==
Games A & B
August 22
Germany	0
Canada	9
August 23
(New York (state)) New York	0
Mexico	4

Game D
August 24
Canada	2
Mexico	0
Game C
August 24
Germany	3
(New York (state)) New York	2

1973 Little League World Series Champions
Tainan City Little League
Tainan City, Taiwan

== Notable players ==
- Ed Vosberg (Tucson, Arizona) - Won a College World Series Championship with the University of Arizona in 1980 and an MLB World Series title with the Florida Marlins in 1997. Pitched 10 seasons in the MLB for the San Diego Padres, San Francisco Giants, Oakland Athletics, Texas Rangers, Marlins, Arizona Diamondbacks, Philadelphia Phillies, and Montreal Expos between 1986 and 2002.
- George Crum (Tampa, Florida) - Drafted in the 23rd Round of the 1980 MLB Draft by the Texas Rangers. Played 7 seasons in the minor leagues.
- Dwight Gooden (Tampa, Florida) was an integral part of the team that qualified for the LLWS but at 9 years old was too young to play at Williamsport.
