= 1961 Little League World Series =

Children's baseball tournament

Tournament details
- Dates: August 22–August 26
- Teams: 8

Final positions
- Champions: (United States) Northern Little League; El Cajon, California
- Runners-up: (United States) El Campo Little League; El Campo, Texas

The 1961 Little League World Series took place between August 22 and August 26 in South Williamsport, Pennsylvania. Northern Little League of El Cajon, California, defeated El Campo Little League of El Campo, Texas, in the championship game of the 15th Little League World Series.

== Teams ==
Countries, States and Provinces represented at the 1961 Little League World Series

United States	International
(Indiana) Terre Haute, Indiana; North Region; American Little League	(Quebec) Montreal, Quebec; Canada Region; Kiwanis East Little League
(Pennsylvania) Levittown, Pennsylvania; East Region; American Little League	(West Germany) Pirmasens, West Germany; Europe Region; Pirmasens Housing Area Little League
(Texas) El Campo, Texas; South Region; El Campo Little League	(Hawaii) Hilo, Hawaii; Pacific Region; Hilo American Little League
(California) El Cajon, California; West Region; Northern Little League	(Mexico) Monterrey, Nuevo León, Mexico; Latin America Region; Industrial Little League

== Winners bracket ==
Quarter-finals
Pennsylvania	0
California (F/7)	1
Canada	5
Hawaii	8
Indiana	2
Texas (F/8)	4
Mexico	4
West Germany	0

Semi-finals
California (F/8)	3
Hawaii	2
Texas	1
Mexico	0

Final
California	4
Texas	2
Third place
Hawaii	0
Mexico	4

== Consolation bracket ==
Games A & B
Pennsylvania	10
Canada	5
Indiana	3
West Germany	0

Game D
Pennsylvania	1
Indiana	5
Game C
Canada	4
West Germany	0

1961 Little League World Series Champions
Northern Little League
El Cajon, California

== Notable players ==
- Brian Sipe of El Cajon went on to play professional football in the NFL and USFL from 1974 through 1985; he was inducted to the Little League Hall of Excellence in 1999.
- George Strickler of American Little League became a successful engineer and golfer.
