= 1982 Little League World Series =

Children's baseball tournament

Tournament details
- Dates: August 24–28, 1982
- Teams: 8

Final positions
- Champions: (United States) (Washington (state)) National Little League; Kirkland, Washington
- Runners-up: Puzih Little League; Chiayi County, Taiwan

The 1982 Little League World Series took place between August 24 and August 28 in South Williamsport, Pennsylvania. The Kirkland National Little League of Kirkland, Washington, defeated the Puzih Little League of Chiayi County, Taiwan, in the championship game of the 36th Little League World Series.

The historic victory by Kirkland snapped the 31-game winning streak by Taiwanese teams and their streak of five consecutive titles. These streaks by Taiwan still stand, and have not been seriously approached by another country or U.S. state. Kirkland's championship was recounted by ESPN's 30 for 30 documentary series in an episode titled "Little Big Men" (season 1, episode 19), which originally aired in 2010.

== Teams ==
United States	International
(Michigan) Wyoming, Michigan; Central Region; Pinery Park Little League	Rouyn-Noranda, Quebec; Canada Region; Rotary Little League
(Maryland) Easton, Maryland; East Region; Easton Little League	(Spain) Madrid, Spain; Europe Region; Torrejon Air Base Little League
(Florida) Sarasota, Florida; South Region; American Little League	Chiayi County, Taiwan (Chinese Taipei); Far East Region; Puzih Little League
(Washington (state)) Kirkland, Washington; West Region; National Little League	(Venezuela) Maracaibo, Venezuela; Latin America Region; Coquivacoa Little League

- Taiwan participates under the name Chinese Taipei in many sporting events, including Little League Baseball (LLB).

== Championship bracket ==
Quarter-finals
August 24
Taiwan	8
Venezuela	2
August 25
Spain	0
Canada	3
August 24
Florida	3
(Washington (state)) Washington	5
August 25 (F/8)
Michigan	4
Maryland	2

Semi-finals
August 26
Taiwan	10
Canada	7
August 26
(Washington (state)) Washington	3
Michigan	2

Final
August 28
Taiwan	0
(Washington (state)) Washington	6
Third place
August 27
Michigan	7
Canada	4

== Position bracket ==
Games A & B
August 25
Florida	1
Venezuela	6
August 26
Spain	18
Maryland	7

Game D
August 27
Venezuela	9
Spain	1
Game C
August 27
Florida	5
Maryland	0

1982 Little League World Series Champions
National Little League
Kirkland, Washington

== Notable players ==
- Wilson Álvarez (Maracaibo, Venezuela) – MLB pitcher between 1989 and 2005
- Stéphane Matteau (Rouyn-Noranda, Quebec) – NHL winger from 1990 to 2003
- Pierre Turgeon (Rouyn-Noranda, Quebec) – NHL center from 1987 to 2007; inducted to the Little League Hall of Excellence in 2007.

== Champions path ==
After winning the district and state championships, Kirkland National Little League won four games at the West Region to reach the LLWS.

Round	Opposition	Result
West Regional
Opening Round	(New Mexico) Copper LL	3–0
Quarterfinals	(California) Oak Grove LL	5–4
Semifinals	(Alaska) Kodiak LL	6–5
Western Region Championship	(California) South Bay LL	3–1
