= 1974 Little League World Series =

Baseball Tournament

Tournament details
- Dates: August 20–August 24
- Teams: 8

Final positions
- Champions: Kaohsiung Little League; Kaohsiung, Taiwan
- Runners-up: (United States) Red Bluff Little League; Red Bluff, California

The 1974 Little League World Series took place between August 20 and August 24 in South Williamsport, Pennsylvania. The Kaohsiung Little League of Kaohsiung, Taiwan, defeated the Red Bluff Little League of Red Bluff, California, in the championship game of the 28th Little League World Series (LLWS).

This was the fourth consecutive title for Taiwan. It remains is the second-longest winning streak by any single country or U.S. state (the longest winning streak is five, also by Taiwan, during 1977–1981). After this series, foreign teams were banned from the competition; however, the ban was rescinded one year later, allowing foreign teams to qualify for the 1976 series. Foreign teams have continued to participate in each edition of the tournament, except for 2021 due to the COVID-19 pandemic.

This was the last LLWS to match U.S. teams with international teams in the opening round of play. This was also the first, and only, LLWS to feature shutouts in all first-round and second-round games of the winner's bracket. The elimination game between Jackson, Tennessee, and Maracaibo, Venezuela, was the first LLWS game scoreless after six innings of regulation play; (Note: The 2015 international championship game also was scoreless after six innings.) the game ended in the seventh inning with a walk-off home run in favor of Venezuela. After the tournament, all teams were invited to Washington, D.C., and were the first official guests greeted by newly inaugurated President Gerald Ford.

== Teams ==
United States	International
(Ohio) Tallmadge, Ohio; Central Region; Tallmadge Little League	Esquimalt, British Columbia; Canada Region; Esquimalt Vic-West Little League
(Connecticut) New Haven, Connecticut; East Region; Walter "Pop" Smith Little League	(Greece) Athens, Greece; Europe Region; Athena Airport Little League
(Tennessee) Jackson, Tennessee; South Region; American Little League	(Taiwan) Kaohsiung, Taiwan; Far East Region; Kaohsiung Little League
(California) Red Bluff, California; West Region; Red Bluff Little League	(Venezuela) Maracaibo, Venezuela; Latin America Region; Coquivacoa Little League

== Championship bracket ==
Quarter-finals
August 20
Connecticut	0
Taiwan	16
August 21
Ohio	8
Greece	0
August 20
Canada	0
California	3
August 21 (F/7)
Tennessee	0
Venezuela	1

Semi-finals
August 22
Taiwan	3
Ohio	0
August 22
California	4
Venezuela	0

Final
August 24
Taiwan	12
California	1
Third place
August 23
Ohio	0
Venezuela	2

== Consolation bracket ==
Games A & B
August 20
Greece	9
Connecticut	13
August 21
Canada	0
Tennessee	10

Game D
August 22
Tennessee	14
Connecticut	3
Game C
August 22 (F/9)
Greece	2
Canada	3

1974 Little League World Series Champions
Kaohsiung Little League
Kaohsiung, Taiwan

== Notable players ==
- Gale Gilbert of Red Bluff went on to play in the NFL as a quarterback between 1985 and 1995.
