= 1981 Little League World Series =

Baseball event in Pennsylvania

Tournament details
- Dates: August 25–August 29
- Teams: 8

Final positions
- Champions: Taiping Little League; Taichung, Taiwan
- Runners-up: (United States) Belmont Heights Little League; Tampa, Florida

The 1981 Little League World Series took place between August 25 and August 29 in South Williamsport, Pennsylvania. The Taiping Little League of Taichung, Taiwan, defeated the Belmont Heights Little League of Tampa, Florida, in the championship game of the 35th Little League World Series (LLWS).

This was the fifth consecutive title for Taiwan, which remains the longest LLWS winning streak by any single country or U.S. state.

== Teams ==
United States	International
(Illinois) Barrington, Illinois; Central Region; Barrington Little League	Trail, British Columbia; Canada Region; Trail Little League
(Connecticut) Stamford, Connecticut; East Region; Federal Little League	(Belgium) Waterloo, Belgium; Europe Region; SHAPE Little League
(Florida) Tampa, Florida; South Region; Belmont Heights Little League	Taichung, Taiwan (Chinese Taipei); Far East Region; Taiping Little League
(California) Escondido, California; West Region; National Little League	(Mexico) Monterrey, Nuevo León, Mexico; Latin America Region; Unidad Modelo Little League

- Taiwan participates under the name Chinese Taipei in many sporting events, including Little League Baseball (LLB).

== Championship bracket ==
Quarter-finals
August 25
Belgium	3
Canada	4
August 26
Taiwan	10
Mexico	0
August 25
Connecticut	3
Florida	6
August 26
California	5
Illinois	6

Semi-finals
August 27
Canada	0
Taiwan	16
August 27
Florida	11
Illinois	10

Final
August 29
Taiwan	4
Florida	2
Third place
August 28
Canada	3
Illinois	7

== Position bracket ==
Games A & B
August 26
Belgium	0
Connecticut	2
August 27
California	9
Mexico	2

Game D
August 28
Connecticut	5
California	8
Game C
August 28
Belgium	2
Mexico	4

1981 Little League World Series Champions
Taiping Little League
Taichung, Taiwan

== Notable players ==
- Derek Bell (Tampa, Florida) – MLB outfielder from 1991 to 2001
- Maurice Crum Sr. (Tampa, Florida) - 2-time NCAA Football Champion (Miami Hurricanes)
- Dan Wilson (Barrington, Illinois) – MLB catcher from 1992 to 2005
- Brett Salisbury (Escondido, California) – college and European league quarterback
