= 1949 Little League World Series =

Children's baseball tournament

Tournament details
- Dates: August 24–August 27
- Teams: 8

Final positions
- Champions: Hammonton, New Jersey
- Runners-up: Pensacola, Florida

The 1949 Little League World Series was held from August 24 to August 27 in Williamsport, Pennsylvania. The Hammonton All Stars of Hammonton, New Jersey, defeated the Pensacola All Stars of Pensacola, Florida, in the third championship game of Little League Baseball.

This was the first tournament to be called the "Little League World Series". Attendees at the championship game included Ford Frick, president of the National League (and later Commissioner of Baseball).

== Teams ==
States represented at the 1949 Little League World Series

Region 1	Bridgeport, Connecticut
Region 2	Hammonton, New Jersey
Region 3	Lock Haven, Pennsylvania
Region 4	(New York (state)) Corning, New York
Region 5	Canton, Ohio
Region 6	Pensacola, Florida
Region 7	North Charleston, South Carolina
Region 8	Lafayette, Indiana

== Bracket ==
Quarter-finals
August 24
Florida	3
Pennsylvania	0
August 25
Connecticut	4
Indiana	1
August 25
New Jersey	6
Ohio	0
August 25
(New York (state)) New York	3
South Carolina	2

Semi-finals
August 26
Florida	9
Connecticut	8
August 26
New Jersey	4
(New York (state)) New York	2

Final
August 27
Florida	0
New Jersey	5
Third place
August 27
Connecticut	12
(New York (state)) New York	1
