= 1975 Little League World Series =

Children's baseball tournament

Tournament details
- Dates: August 20–August 23
- Teams: 4

Final positions
- Champions: Lakewood Little League; Lakewood, New Jersey
- Runner-up: Belmont Heights Little League; Tampa, Florida

The 1975 Little League World Series took place between August 20 and August 23 in South Williamsport, Pennsylvania. The Lakewood Little League of Lakewood, New Jersey, defeated the Belmont Heights Little League of Tampa, Florida, in the championship game of the 29th Little League World Series. Only three games were played in the tournament, consisting of two semi-final games and the championship game, as the third-place game was forfeited.

In the 1970s, "whispers about overage Asian participants grew to shouts" when over a three-year stretch Taiwan outscored U.S. teams, 120–2, in a span of nine Little League World Series games. Then LLWS chairman Peter McGovern reluctantly agreed to a blanket ban of all international teams. After an uproar of criticism and an investigation that could produce no evidence of rules violations, the ban was rescinded for the 1976 event. The next LLWS tournament held without international teams was the 2021 edition, played during the COVID-19 pandemic in the United States.

== Teams ==
(Iowa) Davenport, Iowa
Central Region
American Little League
(New Jersey) Lakewood, New Jersey
East Region
Lakewood Little League
(Florida) Tampa, Florida
South Region
Belmont Heights Little League
(California) Northridge, California
West Region
American Little League

== Bracket ==
Semi-finals
August 20
New Jersey	2
California	0
August 21
Florida	8
Iowa	5

Final
August 23
New Jersey	4
Florida	3
Third place
August 22 Forfeit
California	0
Iowa	6

1975 Little League World Series Champions
Lakewood Little League
Lakewood, New Jersey

== Champions path ==
The Lakewood LL went undefeated, winning all four games to reach the LLWS. In total, their record was 6–0.

Round	Opposition	Result
New Jersey State Tournament
Semifinal	(New Jersey) Bergenfield American LL	8–7 (8 inn.)
Championship	(New Jersey) Nottingham LL	5–2
East Regional
Semifinals	(Vermont) North Burlington LL	5–4
East Region Championship	(Pennsylvania) Carbino Club LL	4–2

== Notable players ==
- Vance Lovelace (Tampa, Florida) - Played in MLB for the California Angels and Seattle Mariners from 1988-90.
- Albert Everett (Tampa, Florida) - Drafted in the 21st Round of the 1981 MLB Draft by the Minnesota Twins. Brother of Carl Everett.
