= 1979 Little League World Series =

Children's baseball tournament

Tournament details
- Dates: August 21–August 25
- Teams: 8

Final positions
- Champions: Puzih Little League; Taipei, Taiwan
- Runners-up: (United States) Campbell Little League; Campbell, California

The 1979 Little League World Series took place between August 21 and August 25 in South Williamsport, Pennsylvania. The Puzih Little League of Taipei, Taiwan, defeated the Campbell Little League of Campbell, California, in the championship game of the 33rd Little League World Series.

In one of the semifinal contests, the Taiwan team recorded a perfect game, defeating a team from Italy.

== Teams ==
United States	International
(Michigan) Grosse Pointe Woods, Michigan; Central Region; National Little League	Sherbrooke, Quebec; Canada Region; Sherbrooke-Lennoxville Little League
(New Jersey) Ridgewood, New Jersey; East Region; National Little League	(Italy) Aviano, Italy; Europe Region; Aviano Air Base Little League
(Arkansas) North Little Rock, Arkansas; South Region; Burns Park Little League	(Taiwan) Taipei City, Taiwan; Far East Region; Puzih Little League
(California) Campbell, California; West Region; Campbell Little League	(Puerto Rico) Santurce, Puerto Rico; Latin America Region; Luis Llornes Torres Little League

== Championship bracket ==
Quarter-finals
August 21
Italy	4
Canada	3
August 22
Puerto Rico	0
Taiwan	3
August 21
New Jersey	1
Arkansas	3
August 22
California	8
Michigan	5

Semi-finals
August 23
Italy	0
Taiwan†	18
August 23
Arkansas	3
California	8

Final
August 25 (F/8)
Taiwan	2
California	1
Third place
August 24
Italy	1
Arkansas	8

† Perfect game

== Position bracket ==
Games A & B
August 22
Canada	6
New Jersey	5
August 23
Michigan	0
Puerto Rico	10

Game D
August 24
Canada	1
Puerto Rico	10
Game C
August 24
Michigan	4
New Jersey	9

1979 Little League World Series Champions
Puzih Town Little League
Taipei, Taiwan
