= 1985 Little League World Series =

Children's baseball tournament

Tournament details
- Dates: August 20–August 24
- Teams: 8

Final positions
- Champions: National Little League; Seoul, South Korea
- Runners-up: Mexicali, Baja California, Mexico

The 1985 Little League World Series took place between August 20 and August 24 in South Williamsport, Pennsylvania. The National Little League of Seoul, South Korea, defeated the Mexicali Little League of Mexicali, Mexico, in the championship game of the 39th Little League World Series (LLWS).

This is the only LLWS championship game that featured two non-United States teams, as the team from Mexico represented the West Region of the United States. (Note: See also Mexico in the Little League World Series) Seoul became the second team to repeat as LLWS champions, joining Monterrey, Mexico, repeat winners in 1957 and 1958.

== Teams ==
United States	International
(Minnesota) Minnetonka, Minnesota; Central Region; East Tonka Little League	Binbrook, Ontario; Canada Region; Glanbrook Little League
(New York (state)) Staten Island, New York; East Region; South Shore Little League	(Saudi Arabia) Al Khobar, Saudi Arabia; Europe Region; Persian Gulf Little League
(Tennessee) Morristown, Tennessee; South Region; American Little League	(South Korea) Seoul, South Korea; Far East Region; National Little League
(Mexico) Mexicali, Baja California, Mexico; West Region; Mexicali Little League	(Venezuela) Maracaibo, Venezuela; Latin America Region; Coquivacoa Little League

== Championship bracket ==
Quarter-finals
August 20
Venezuela	2
South Korea	13
August 21
Saudi Arabia	5
Canada	6
August 20
Mexico	6
(New York (state)) New York	3
August 21
Tennessee	5
Minnesota	1

Semi-finals
August 22
South Korea	16
Canada	0
August 22
Mexico	2
Tennessee	1

Final
August 24
South Korea	7
Mexico	1
Third place
August 23
Tennessee	4
Canada	0

== Position bracket ==
Games A & B
August 21
Venezuela	7
(New York (state)) New York	3
August 22
Saudi Arabia	2
Minnesota	4

Game D
August 23
Venezuela	9
Minnesota	0
Game C
August 23
(New York (state)) New York	11
Saudi Arabia	2

1985 Little League World Series Champions
Seoul National Little League
Seoul, South Korea

== Notable players ==
- Jim Brower (Minnetonka, Minnesota) – MLB and NPB pitcher from 1999–2008
- David Cortés (Mexicali, Baja California, Mexico) – MLB and KBO pitcher from 1999–2008
