= 1970 Little League World Series =

Children's baseball tournament

Tournament details
- Dates: August 25–August 29
- Teams: 8

Final positions
- Champions: (United States) American Little League; Wayne, New Jersey
- Runners-up: (United States) Campbell Little League; Campbell, California

The 1970 Little League World Series took place between August 25 and August 29 in South Williamsport, Pennsylvania. The American Little League of Wayne, New Jersey, defeated the Campbell Little League of Campbell, California, in the championship game of the 24th Little League World Series.

== Teams ==
United States	International
(Indiana) Highland, Indiana; North Region; South Little League	Salaberry-de-Valleyfield, Quebec; Canada Region; Valleyfield Little League
(New Jersey) Wayne, New Jersey; East Region; American Little League	(Germany) Wiesbaden, Germany; Europe Region; Wiesbaden Little League
(Tennessee) Nashville, Tennessee; South Region; National Optimist Little League	(Taiwan) Chiayi City, Taiwan; Far East Region; Chiayi Little League
(California) Campbell, California; West Region; Campbell Little League	(Nicaragua) Chinandega, Nicaragua; Latin America Region; Chinandega Little League

== Winners bracket ==
Quarter-finals
August 25
Taiwan	2
Nicaragua	3
August 25 (F/8)
Tennessee	1
California	2
August 26
Indiana	2
Germany	0
August 26
New Jersey	10
Canada	0

Semi-finals
August 27
Nicaragua	1
California	2
August 27
Indiana	0
New Jersey	4

Final
August 29
California	0
New Jersey	2
Third place
August 28
Nicaragua	3
Indiana	0

== Consolation bracket ==
Games A & B
August 26
Taiwan	6
Tennessee	0
August 26
Germany	1
Canada	0

Game D
August 27
Taiwan	5
Germany	0
Game C
August 28
Tennessee	9
Canada	1

1970 Little League World Series Champions
American Little League
Wayne, New Jersey

== Notable players ==
- Ben Hayes played for the Wiesbaden, Germany team. He later played in MLB with the Cincinnati Reds
