= 1966 Little League World Series =

Children's baseball tournament

Tournament details
- Dates: August 22–August 27
- Teams: 8

Final positions
- Champions: (United States) Westbury American Little League; Houston, Texas
- Runners-up: (United States) American Little League; West New York, New Jersey

The 1966 Little League World Series took place between August 22 and August 27 in South Williamsport, Pennsylvania. Westbury American Little League of Houston, Texas, defeated American Little League of West New York, New Jersey, in the championship game of the 20th Little League World Series.

== Teams ==
United States	International
(Illinois) Kankakee, Illinois; North Region; Kankakee Jaycee Little League	(Ontario) Windsor, Ontario; Canada Region; Windsor Central Little League
(New Jersey) West New York, New Jersey; East Region; American Little League	(Germany) Rhein-Main, West Germany; Europe Region; Rhein-Main Little League
(Texas) Houston, Texas; South Region; Westbury American Little League	(Japan) Wakayama, Japan; Far East Region; Wakayama Little League
(California) Sacramento, California; West Region; Airport Little League	(Mexico) Monterrey, Nuevo León, Mexico; Latin America Region; Cuauhtemoc Little League

== Winners bracket ==
Quarter-finals
California	3
Canada	1
Texas	6
Mexico	0
Illinois	1
New Jersey	3
Japan (F/8)	6
West Germany	2

Semi-finals
California	0
Texas	4
New Jersey	4
Japan	0

Final
Texas	8
New Jersey	2
Third place
California	6
Japan	0

== Consolation bracket ==
Games A & B
Canada	7
Mexico	8
Illinois	6
West Germany	3

Game D
Mexico	1
Illinois	2
Game C
Canada	1
West Germany	4

1966 Little League World Series Champions
Westbury American Little League
Houston, Texas
