= 1994 Little League World Series =

Children's baseball tournament

Tournament details
- Dates: August 22–August 27
- Teams: 8

Final positions
- Champions: Coquivacoa Little League; Maracaibo, Venezuela
- Runners-up: (United States) Northridge City Little League; Northridge, California

The 1994 Little League World Series took place between August 22 and August 27 in South Williamsport, Pennsylvania. The Coquivacoa Little League of Maracaibo, Venezuela, defeated the Northridge Little League team of Northridge, California, in the championship game of the 48th Little League World Series.

== Teams ==
United States	International
(Minnesota) Brooklyn Center, Minnesota; Central Region; American Little League	Glace Bay, Nova Scotia; Canada Region; Glace Bay Little League
(Massachusetts) Middleborough, Massachusetts; East Region; Middleborough Little League	(Saudi Arabia) Dhahran, Saudi Arabia; Europe Region; Arabian American Little League
(Virginia) Springfield, Virginia; South Region; Central Springfield Little League	Tainan, Taiwan (Chinese Taipei); Far East Region; Li-Jen Little League
(California) Northridge, California; West Region; Northridge Little League	(Venezuela) Maracaibo, Venezuela; Latin America Region; Coquivacoa Little League

- Taiwan participates under the name Chinese Taipei in many sporting events, including Little League Baseball (LLB).

== Pool play ==
United States
Rank	State	Record
1	California	2–1
2	Virginia	2–1
3	Massachusetts	1–2
4	Minnesota	1–2

International
Rank	Country	Record
1	Venezuela	3–0
2	Saudi Arabia	2–1
3	Taiwan	1–2
4	Canada	0–3

Pool	Team 1	Score	Team 2	Score
August 22
INT	Taiwan	4	Canada	1
US	Virginia (F/8)	2	Massachusetts	1
INT	Venezuela	5	Saudi Arabia	1
US	Minnesota	4	California	2
August 23
INT	Canada	3	Saudi Arabia	6
US	Massachusetts	4	California	6
INT	Taiwan	1	Venezuela	4
US	Virginia	4	Minnesota	1
August 24
INT	Saudi Arabia	3	Taiwan	2
US	Massachusetts	11	Minnesota	5
INT	Venezuela	3	Canada	0
US	Virginia	0	California	2

== Elimination round ==
Semi-finals
August 25
Venezuela	10
Saudi Arabia	1
August 25
Virginia	0
California	3

Final
August 27
Venezuela	4
California	3

1994 Little League World Series Champions
Coquivacoa Little League
Maracaibo, Venezuela

== Notable players ==
- Matt Cassel (Northridge, California) – NFL quarterback
- Yusmeiro Petit (Maracaibo, Venezuela) – MLB pitcher, first player to win both the LLWS and World Series (2012 and 2014, San Francisco Giants)
- Guillermo Quiróz (Maracaibo, Venezuela) – MLB catcher
- Krissy Wendell-Pohl (Brooklyn Center, Minnesota) – Olympic hockey player; inducted to the Little League Hall of Excellence in 2004.
