= 1962 Little League World Series =

Children's baseball tournament

Tournament details
- Dates: August 21–August 25
- Teams: 8

Final positions
- Champions: (United States) Moreland Little League; San Jose, California
- Runners-up: (United States) Jaycee Little League; Kankakee, Illinois

The 1962 Little League World Series took place between August 21 and August 25 in South Williamsport, Pennsylvania. Moreland Little League of San Jose, California, defeated Jaycee Little League of Kankakee, Illinois, in the championship game of the 16th Little League World Series.

== Teams ==
Countries, States and Provinces represented at the 1962 Little League World Series

| United States | International |
|---|---|
| (Illinois) Kankakee, Illinois; North Region; Jaycee Little League | (Ontario) Stoney Creek, Ontario; Canada Region; Optimist Little League |
| (New Jersey) Pitman, New Jersey; East Region; Pitman Little League | (France) Vienne, France; Europe Region; Poitiers Post Little League |
| (Texas) Del Rio, Texas; South Region; Val Verde County Little League | (Japan) Kunitachi, Tokyo; Far East Region; Kunitachi Little League |
| (California) San Jose, California; West Region; Moreland Little League | (Mexico) Monterrey, Nuevo León, Mexico; Latin America Region; Del Norte Little League |

== Championship bracket ==
Quarter-finals
Texas | 1
New Jersey | 2
Illinois | 13
Canada | 1
France | 2
California | 22
Mexico | 3
Japan | 2

Semi-finals
New Jersey | 5
Illinois | 9
California | 2
Mexico | 0

Final
Illinois | 0
California | 3
Third place
New Jersey | 8
Mexico | 5

== Consolation bracket ==
Games A & B
Texas | 2
Canada | 1
France | 2
Japan | 1

Game C
Texas | 8
France | 2
Game D
Canada | 0
Japan | 9

1962 Little League World Series Champions
Moreland Little League
San Jose, California

== Notable players ==
- Larvell Blanks of Del Rio went on to play in MLB as an infielder from 1972 through 1980
