= 1957 Little League World Series =

Children's baseball tournament in Williamsport, Pennsylvania

Tournament details
- Dates: August 21–August 23
- Teams: 4

Final positions
- Champions: Industrial Little League; Monterrey, Nuevo León, Mexico
- Runners-up: (United States); Northern La Mesa Little League; La Mesa, California

The 1957 Little League World Series took place during August 21 through 23 in Williamsport, Pennsylvania. Industrial Little League of Monterrey, Nuevo León, Mexico, defeated Northern La Mesa Little League of La Mesa, California, in the championship game of the 11th Little League World Series (LLWS). Ángel Macías threw the first and, to date, only perfect game in an LLWS championship. (Note: It was the second perfect game in LLWS tournament history, as a pitcher from New Jersey, Fred Shapiro, threw a perfect game in a semi-final contest of the 1956 tournament.)

This was the first LLWS to invite teams from qualifying regions: North, South, East, and West. Monterrey, representing the South region, became the first team from outside the United States or Canada to participate in a LLWS, and the first non-U.S. team to win a championship.

== Industrial Little League of Monterrey ==
In 1956, Monterrey was granted a Little League license. They assembled a four-team "Industrial Little League" consisting of teams from different factories, the Botelleros, Mineros, Tubitos, and Incas. Many of the kids came from low-income families and even worked in the factories themselves. Before the teams could play, they had to clear the field of rocks and broken glass. They even had to use homemade gloves and equipment.

In 1957, the league had a tryout for a Little League team that would represent the city. The coach, Cesar Faz, recruited the kids. He became known as a great baseball coach and was considered one of the best at motivating a youth baseball team. In July, after playing two exhibition games in Mexico, the Monterrey team's historic run to the Little League World Series began. The team first took a bus to Reynosa, Mexico. From there, they crossed the Mexico–United States border, walking across a bridge over the Rio Grande. The team then continued on to a hotel in McAllen, Texas. In McAllen, they played a U.S. subregional tournament. The team won their first game against a team from Mexico City, 9–2. They went on to defeat the McAllen All Stars, the Mission All Stars, the Weslaco All Stars, and the Western Brownsville All Stars to advance to a regional tournament in Corpus Christi. While there, they beat another team from Mexico City and then beat the Houston All Stars. The team then travelled to Fort Worth to play in the Texas State Tournament. Up until that point, they had beat every team by at least five runs. However, in the state semifinals, they needed extra innings to beat another Houston All Star team, 6–4. After they survived that game, they defeated the Waco All Stars, 11–2, to advance to the tournament of Little League's South Region.

The team got on a plane and flew to Louisville, Kentucky, for the South Region tournament. Their first game was against Biloxi, Mississippi. They won that game, 13–0. The next game, for the South Region championship, was against Owensboro, Kentucky. They won that game, 3–0. The Monterrey team was now headed to the Little League World Series. The team loaded up on to a bus and headed 700 miles (1,100 km) northwest to Williamsport, Pennsylvania.

=== Adversity ===
During all this, the players' visas expired. The U.S. ambassador to Mexico had to intervene to keep them legally in the country. The team was young, in a foreign country, and away from their families—only one of the players had ever left Monterrey before. The team only had the money to eat twice a day. The team was sustained by strangers and new friends who offered them meals at restaurants, and gave them some money after a win.

On the field, no team from outside the U.S. had ever won a game at the Little League World Series. Two Canadian teams had previously made it to Williamsport, but each had lost the only game they played.

=== Williamsport ===
When they arrived in Williamsport, Little League officials gave them new uniforms that said "South" across the chest. However, the uniforms did not fit because the Monterrey players were so much smaller than players on the other teams, as the boys from Monterrey averaged 4 feet 11 inches (1.50 m) and 92 pounds (42 kg), while the other teams' players averaged 5 feet 4 inches (1.63 m) and 127 pounds (58 kg). Unfazed, they beat Bridgeport, Connecticut, 2–1, to reach the championship game. They were set to face La Mesa, California, who had easily beaten Escanaba, Michigan.

Many people believed that the boys from Monterrey had little chance to win. Even some of the Monterrey players were questioning what would happen to them the next day. The coach, Cesar Faz, decided to name Ángel Macías as the starting pitcher for the championship game. What he did that day led him to become known as "The Little Big Man". He stood 5 feet (1.5 m) tall and weighed 88 pounds (40 kg). He was an ambidextrous pitcher. However, he decided to only throw with his right hand in this game.

In the championship game, the first batter, Lew Riley of La Mesa, hit the first pitch of the game on a hard line drive down the first base line; it was foul by an inch. That was the closest La Mesa came to a hit all afternoon. In front of 10,000 people in Williamsport, and others listening via radio in Monterrey, Macías proceeded to be perfect—he did not allow a batter to get on a base. He struck out 11 out of the 18 batters he faced, and no ball left the infield. With two outs in the 6th (final) inning, La Mesa's Bryon Haggard stepped into the box. Macías quickly fell behind in the count, 3–0. He proceeded to battle back and threw two strikes to make it a full count. Macías then wound up and threw a curveball that made Haggard swing and miss. Macías had thrown a perfect game in a Little League World Series championship game, the first player to do so. The team from Monterrey became the first team from outside the United States to win the Little League World Series.

=== Aftermath ===
The next morning, the story was getting national and international coverage and attention. Newspapers and news stations ran stories about the team from Monterrey. Having won the Little League World Series, the team's first thought was to go home. However, it would be almost a month until the team returned to Monterrey. They began their victory tour by traveling by bus to New York City. While they were there, the Brooklyn Dodgers invited them to be their guest at Ebbets Field. The team then went shopping at Macy's Department Store and were each given $40 to spend. After leaving New York, the team headed to Washington D.C. While they were there, they met with President Dwight D. Eisenhower and Vice President Richard Nixon.

The team then travelled to Mexico City. There, they met with Mexican President Ruiz Cortinez and attended celebrations. They were considered national heroes. The team then flew from Mexico City to their hometown of Monterrey. When they arrived, they were met with tens of thousands of people in the streets. A parade was organized for the team. It started at the airport and stretched to the Government Palace. During the parade, people were trying to take parts of their uniforms, hats, belts, cleats as memorabilia and souvenirs. After the parade, the Mexican government awarded all 14 members of the team a scholarship for both high school and college education. However, only two of them ever actually went to college. According to a few of the players, everywhere they went, people recognized them and wanted autographs.

=== Later events ===
The team went on to successfully defend their Little League title the following year.

As the players grew up, they all went their separate ways. At age 16, Angel Macías was signed by the American League's new expansion team, the Los Angeles Angels. He was invited to their spring training in 1961. He played for a couple of seasons (1962–1963) as an outfielder in Minor League Baseball, advancing as far as the Class A California League. He also played a total of 12 seasons in Mexico, primarily in the Mexican League with Broncos de Reynosa and Sultanes de Monterrey. After his playing career, he ran the Mexican Academy, which is a minor league circuit. He was inducted into Little League Hall of Excellence in 2017. One of the other players, Jose "Pepe" Maiz, also was inducted in 2005. Both Maiz and Macías did a lot for the growth of baseball in Mexico. As of 2017, Maiz also ran a construction company and owned the Sultanes de Monterrey.

There were two movies made about the 1957 historic run of Monterrey Little League: a 1960 Mexican production called Los Pequeños Gigantes and a 2009 film called The Perfect Game. The Futility Closet podcast covered the team and their Little League World Series championship in an episode.

== Teams ==
States and Provinces represented at the 1957 Little League World Series

Teams
(Michigan) Escanaba, Michigan; North Region; Jaycee Little League	(Connecticut) Bridgeport, Connecticut; East Region; North End Little League
(California) La Mesa, California; West Region; Northern La Mesa Little League	(Mexico) Monterrey, Nuevo León, Mexico; South Region; Industrial Little League

== Championship bracket ==
California's first game was played a day later than planned, due to illness within the team, resulting in the third-place game also being delayed a day.

Semi-finals
August 22
California	7
Michigan	1
August 21
Mexico	2
Connecticut	1

Final
August 23
California	0
Mexico	4
Third place
August 23
Michigan	3
Connecticut	4

1957 Little League World Series Champions
Industrial Little League
Monterrey, Nuevo León
