= 2001 Little League World Series =

Children's baseball tournament

Tournament details
- Dates: August 17–August 26
- Teams: 16

Final positions
- Champions: Kitasuna Little League; Tokyo, Japan
- Runners-up: National Little League (United States) Apopka, Florida

The 2001 Little League World Series took place between August 17 and August 26 in South Williamsport, Pennsylvania. The Kitasuna Little League of Tokyo, Japan, defeated Apopka National Little League of Apopka, Florida, in the championship game of the 55th Little League World Series (LLWS). This tournament saw the expansion of pool play to 16 teams, eight from the United States, and eight from around the world. This was the first LLWS to use Little League Volunteer Stadium; it was built to accommodate games added to the pool stage and to host the tournament's consolation game for third place.

== Age controversy ==
Following the conclusion of the tournament, Danny Almonte, a pitcher from the Bronx, New York, team representing the Mid-Atlantic Region, was the center of a scandal when it was discovered that he was not eligible to play in the tournament because he was two years over the maximum age limit. Because of this, the Mid-Atlantic team was retroactively assessed a forfeit for each game they won in the tournament. The team's statistics, including a perfect game thrown by Almonte, were also invalidated.

== Qualification ==
Between five and twelve teams take part in 16 regional qualification tournaments, which vary in format depending on region. In the United States, the qualification tournaments are in the same format as the Little League World Series itself: a round-robin tournament followed by an elimination round to determine the regional champion.

Pool A	Pool B	Pool C	Pool D
(Rhode Island) Lincoln, Rhode Island; New England; Lincoln Little League	(New York (state)) Bronx, New York; Mid-Atlantic; Rolando Paulino Little League	(Panama) Santiago de Veraguas, Panama; Latin America; Santiago de Veraguas Little League	Hagåtña, Guam; Pacific; Guam Little League
(California) Oceanside, California; West; Oceanside American Little League	(Washington (state)) Bainbridge Island, Washington; Northwest; Bainbridge Island Little League	(Curaçao) (Netherlands Antilles) Willemstad, Curaçao; Caribbean; Pariba Little League	(Canada) (Alberta) Calgary, Alberta; Canada; Calgary West Little League
(Indiana) Brownsburg, Indiana; Great Lakes; Brownsburg Little League	(Iowa) Davenport, Iowa; Midwest; Davenport East Little League	(Saudi Arabia) Dhahran, Saudi Arabia; Transatlantic; Arabian-American Little League	(Russia) Moscow, Russia; Europe; Khovrino Little League
(Louisiana) Lake Charles, Louisiana; Gulf States; South Lake Charles Little League	(Florida) Apopka, Florida; Southeast; Apopka National Little League	(Japan) Tokyo, Japan; Asia; Kitasuna Little League	(Mexico) (Tamaulipas) Matamoros, Tamaulipas; Mexico; Matamoros Little League

- Guam is an organized, unincorporated territory of the United States.

== Pool play ==
The top two teams in each pool moved on to the elimination round.

=== United States ===
Pool A
Region	Record
Indiana	3–0
California	2–1
Louisiana	1–2
Rhode Island	0–3

Pool B
Region	Record
Florida	2–1
Washington	1–2‡
Iowa	0–3
New York	0–3†

† Bronx, New York, won all three of their pool games, but were
later assessed forfeits due to their use of an ineligible player.
‡ Bainbridge Island, Washington, was retroactively placed second
in Pool B due to the Bronx forfeits.

August 17

Rhode Island	0–8	California
Indiana	2–0	Louisiana

August 18

New York	Forfeit (Note: Win (5–0) by the Bronx later ruled a forfeit due to an ineligible player.)	Florida
Washington	4–3	Iowa
Rhode Island	1–5	Indiana

August 19

Florida	2–0	Washington
California	5–2	Louisiana

August 20

Iowa	Forfeit (Note: Win (7–4) by the Bronx later ruled a forfeit due to an ineligible player.)	New York
Rhode Island	2–5	Louisiana
Indiana	2–1	California

August 21

Washington	Forfeit (Note: Win (5–0) by the Bronx later ruled a forfeit due to an ineligible player.)	New York
Florida	10–3	Iowa

=== International ===
Pool C
Region	Record
Curaçao	2–1
Japan	2–1
Saudi Arabia	1–2
Panama	1–2

Pool D
Region	Record
Guam	3–0
Mexico	2–1
Canada	1–2
Russia	0–3

August 17

Transatlantic	2–4	Asia

August 18

Mexico	5–6	Pacific
Caribbean	3–2	Latin America
Europe	1–5	Canada

August 19

Transatlantic	3–10	Caribbean

August 20

Canada	5–6	Mexico
Europe	0–5	Pacific
Asia	1–6	Latin America

August 21

Pacific	6–5	Canada
Mexico	2–0	Europe
Asia	4–2	Caribbean
Transatlantic	11–0^{†} (5 innings)	Latin America

† Game ended by "mercy rule" (at least 10-run difference through 5 innings)

== Elimination rounds ==
The 2001 Little League World Series was the first edition that had a female umpire call the championship game: Flora Stansbury from Seneca, Missouri. U.S. President George W. Bush, himself a little leaguer as a child, was also in attendance at the championship game. Nobuhisa Baba's single in the bottom of the sixth drove in the winning run.

Quarter-finals
August 22 - Lamade; Game ended by mercy rule
Tokyo, Japan	15
Matamoros, Mexico	5
August 23 - Lamade
Hagåtňa, Guam	3
(Netherlands Antilles) Willemstad, Curaçao	4
August 22 - Lamade
Brownsburg, Indiana	1
Apopka, Florida	6
August 23 - Lamade; Forfeit (Note: Win (1–0) by the Bronx later ruled a forfeit due to an ineligible player.)
(New York (state)) Bronx, New York	0
Oceanside, California	6

Semi-finals
August 25 - Lamade
Tokyo, Japan	2
(Netherlands Antilles) Willemstad, Curaçao	1
August 25 - Lamade
Apopka, Florida	8
(New York (state)) Bronx, New York	2

Final
August 26 - Lamade
Tokyo, Japan	2
(United States) Apopka, Florida	1
Third place
August 26 - Volunteer; Forfeit (Note: Win (9–1) by the Bronx later ruled a forfeit due to an ineligible player.)
(New York (state)) Bronx, New York	0
(Netherlands Antilles) Willemstad, Curaçao	6

2001 Little League World Series Champions
Kitasuna Little League
Tokyo, Japan

== Champions' path ==
The Kitasuna LL reached the LLWS with an undefeated record of four wins and no losses. In total, their record was 9–1, their only loss coming in the LLWS qualifying round against Santiago de Veraguas LL of Panama.

Round	Opposition	Result
All-Tokyo Tournament
Opening Round	Ryuugasaki LL	11–4
Quarterfinals	Suzaka LL	6–1
Semifinals	Matsusaka LL	12–8
Japan Championship	Nagoya Kita LL	5–4

== Notable players ==
- Danny Almonte (Bronx, New York), subject of the player-eligibility controversy in this tournament
- Francisco Peña (Bronx, New York), Major League Baseball catcher and son of Tony Peña
- Rubén Tejada (Santiago de Veraguas, Panama), Major League Baseball infielder
