= Little Mountain =

Little Mountain may mean:

== Places ==
=== United States ===
- Little Mountain (Ohio)
- Little Mountain (South Carolina), a mountain
  - Little Mountain, South Carolina, a town named for it
    - Little Mountain Historic District
- Little Mountain (Tennessee)
- Little Mountain Pictograph Site, Virginia
- Little Mountain, a mountain and eponymous neighborhood in San Bernardino, California
  - Little Mountain fire, October 2007 wildfire
  - Little Mountain fire, 2017 wildfire

=== Elsewhere ===
- Little Mountain (British Columbia) in Vancouver, Canada
  - Little Mountain Sound Studios, a Vancouver recording facility
  - Riley Park, Vancouver, also known as Riley Park–Little Mountain, a neighborhood in Vancouver
  - Vancouver-Little Mountain, provincial electoral district
- Little Mountain, Queensland, a suburb of Australia's Sunshine Coast

== Music ==
- Little Mountain (album) (2012), the third studio album from Said the Whale
