= Little =

Little is a synonym for small size and may refer to:

== Arts and entertainment ==
- Little (album), 1990 debut album of Vic Chesnutt
- Little (film), 2019 American comedy film
- The Littles, a series of children's novels by American author John Peterson
  - The Littles (TV series), an American animated series based on the novels

== Places ==
- Little, Kentucky, United States
- Little, West Virginia, United States

== Other uses ==
- Clan Little, a Scottish clan
- Little (surname), an English surname
- Little (automobile), an American automobile manufactured from 1912 to 1915
- Little, Brown and Company, an American publishing company
- USS Little, multiple United States Navy ships
- A role in ageplay

== See also ==
- Little Mountain (disambiguation)
- Little River (disambiguation)
- Little Island (disambiguation)
