= 2010 Little League World Series results =

Children's baseball competition results

The results of the 2010 Little League World Series were determined between August 20 and August 29, 2010 in South Williamsport, Pennsylvania. 16 teams were divided into four groups, two with four teams from the United States and two with four international teams each, with both groups playing a double-elimination tournament. In each group, the last remaining team advanced to the single-elimination stage. The last remaining team from the United States faced the last remaining international team for the Little League World Series Championship.

Pool play
	Game 1	Game 2	Game 3	Game 4	Game 5	Game 6	Game 7
Pool A	(Ohio) OH 16◄ (New Jersey) NJ 6 Linescore	(Hawaii) HI 2 (Georgia (U.S. state)) GA 6◄ Linescore	(Hawaii) HI 3◄ (New Jersey) NJ 1 Linescore	(Ohio) OH 0 (Georgia (U.S. state)) GA 6◄ Linescore	(Ohio) OH 4 (Hawaii) HI 6◄ Linescore	(Hawaii) HI 7◄ (Georgia (U.S. state)) GA 4 Linescore	(Georgia (U.S. state)) GA 5 (Hawaii) HI 12◄ Linescore
Pool B	(Washington (state)) WA 1 (Connecticut) CT 3◄ Linescore	(Texas) TX 10◄ (Minnesota) MN 8 Linescore	(Washington (state)) WA 5◄ (Minnesota) MN 2 Linescore	(Texas) TX 14◄ (Connecticut) CT 1 (F/4); Linescore	(Washington (state)) WA 9◄ (Connecticut) CT 5 Linescore	(Texas) TX 4 (Washington (state)) WA 7◄ Linescore	(Texas) TX 7◄ (Washington (state)) WA 5 Linescore
Pool C	(Germany) GER 0 (F/4) (Puerto Rico) PUR 11◄ Linescore	(Japan) JPN 4◄ (Mexico) MEX 2 Linescore	(Mexico) MEX 11◄ (Germany) GER 2 Linescore	(Japan) JPN 7◄ (Puerto Rico) PUR 2 Linescore	(Puerto Rico) PUR 2 (Mexico) MEX 4◄ Linesscore	(Japan) JPN 3◄ (Mexico) MEX 2 Linescore	
Pool D	(Canada) CAN 4◄ (Panama) PAN 2 Linescore	(Chinese Taipei) TPE 18◄ (Saudi Arabia) SAU 0 (F/4); Linescore	(Saudi Arabia) SAU 0 (F/4) (Panama) PAN 13◄ Linescore	(Chinese Taipei) TPE 23◄ (Canada) CAN 0 (F/4); Linescore	(Canada) CAN 2 (Panama) PAN 4◄ Linescore	(Chinese Taipei) TPE 5◄ (Panama) PAN 1 Linescore	
Crossover games	Minnesota 1 Germany 2◄ Linescore			New Jersey 10◄ Saudi Arabia 0 Linescore			
Elimination round
Semifinals	Chinese Taipei 2 (F/7); Japan 3◄ Linescore			Texas 0 (F/5); Hawaii 10◄ Linescore			
Consolation game	Chinese Taipei 14◄ Texas 2 (F/4); Linescore						
Championship game	Japan 4◄ (Hawaii) West 1 Linescore						

== Pool Play ==
=== Pool A ===
Games 1–3
-	Ohio	16
-	New Jersey	6
-	(Georgia (U.S. state)) Georgia	6
-	Hawaii	2
Lower round 1
L1	New Jersey	1
L2	Hawaii	3

Games 4–5
W1	Ohio	0
W2	(Georgia (U.S. state)) Georgia	6
Lower final
W3	Hawaii	6
L4	Ohio	4

Games 6–7
W4	(Georgia (U.S. state)) Georgia	4	5
W5	Hawaii	7	12

==== Game 1: Ohio 16, New Jersey 6 ====
August 21 11:00 am EDT Lamade Stadium
Team	1	2	3	4	5	6	R	H	E
Ohio ◄	8	1	0	4	1	2	16	15	1
New Jersey	3	3	0	0	0	0	6	5	2
WP: Jarod Morrison (1–0) LP: Joey Rose (0–1) Sv: None; Home runs: OH: Jarod Morrison (1), Jacob Jones 2 (2); NJ: Joey Rose (1); Boxscore

==== Game 2: Georgia 6, Hawaii 2 ====
August 21 3:00 pm EDT Lamade Stadium
Team	1	2	3	4	5	6	R	H	E
Hawaii	2	0	0	0	0	0	2	2	1
(Georgia (U.S. state)) Georgia ◄	4	0	0	0	2	X	6	3	1
WP: Jacob Pate (1–0) LP: Noah Shackles (0–1) Sv: None; Home runs: HI: Ty DeSa (1); GA: Knox Carter (1); Boxscore

==== Game 3: Hawaii 3, New Jersey 1 ====
August 22 2:00 pm EDT Lamade Stadium
Team	1	2	3	4	5	6	R	H	E
Hawaii ◄	1	0	1	0	1	0	3	9	1
New Jersey	1	0	0	0	0	0	1	3	1
WP: Shiloh Baniaga (1–0) LP: Michael Tiplady (0–1) Sv: Dane Kaneshiro (1); Home runs: HI: Ty DeSa (2), Shiloh Baniaga (1); NJ: Kevin Blum (1); Notes: New Jersey is eliminated. Boxscore

==== Game 4: Georgia 6, Ohio 0 ====
August 24 4:00 pm EDT Volunteer Stadium
Team	1	2	3	4	5	6	R	H	E
Ohio	0	0	0	0	0	0	0	5	0
(Georgia (U.S. state)) Georgia ◄	3	0	1	1	1	X	6	7	1
WP: Troy Gilliland (1–0) LP: Cole Heflin (0–1) Sv: None; Home runs: OH: None; GA: Blake Hicks (1), Kobie Buglioli (1), Matthew Lang (1); Boxscore

==== Game 5: Hawaii 6, Ohio 4 ====
August 25 4:00 pm EDT Lamade Stadium
Team	1	2	3	4	5	6	R	H	E
Ohio	0	1	0	3	0	0	4	7	0
Hawaii ◄	0	0	0	6	0	X	6	1	0
WP: Ezra Heleski (1–0) LP: Brooks Robinson (0–1) Sv: None; Home runs: OH: Ryan Robinson (1); HI: Matthew Campos (1); Notes: Ohio is eliminated. Boxscore

==== Game 6: Hawaii 7, Georgia 4 ====
August 26 7:00 pm EDT Lamade Stadium
Team	1	2	3	4	5	6	R	H	E
Hawaii ◄	0	2	3	0	0	2	7	10	0
(Georgia (U.S. state)) Georgia	0	0	0	1	0	3	4	4	1
WP: Noah Shackles (1–1) LP: Blake Hicks (0–1) Sv: None; Home runs: HI: Justice Nakagawa (1); GA: None; Boxscore

==== Game 7: Hawaii 12, Georgia 5 ====
August 27 2:00 pm EDT Lamade Stadium
Team	1	2	3	4	5	6	R	H	E
(Georgia (U.S. state)) Georgia	0	0	4	0	1	0	5	8	3
Hawaii ◄	0	0	4	3	5	X	12	7	1
WP: Keolu Ramos (1–0) LP: Jacob Pate (1–1) Sv: None; Home runs: GA: None; HI: None; Notes: Georgia is eliminated. Boxscore

=== Pool B ===
Games 1–3
-	Connecticut	3
-	(Washington (state)) Washington	1
-	Minnesota	8
-	Texas	10
Lower round 1
L1	(Washington (state)) Washington	5
L2	Minnesota	2

Games 4–5
W1	Connecticut	1
W2	Texas (F/4)	14
Lower final
W3	(Washington (state)) Washington	9
L4	Connecticut	5

Games 6–7
W4	Texas	4	7
W5	(Washington (state)) Washington	7	5

==== Game 1: Connecticut 3, Washington 1 ====
August 20 1:00 pm EDT Volunteer Stadium
Team	1	2	3	4	5	6	R	H	E
(Washington (state)) Washington	0	0	0	1	0	0	1	6	1
Connecticut ◄	0	1	0	0	2	X	3	5	3
WP: Nick Nardone (1–0) LP: Isaiah Hatch (0–1) Sv: Eddie Magi (1); Home runs: WA: None; CT: None; Boxscore

==== Game 2: Texas 10, Minnesota 8 ====
August 20 3:00 pm EDT Lamade Stadium
Team	1	2	3	4	5	6	R	H	E
Texas ◄	3	5	0	1	1	0	10	12	1
Minnesota	0	0	2	2	0	4	8	3	0
WP: Mason Van Noort (1–0) LP: Nick Tuel (0–1) Sv: Pryce Beshoory (1); Home runs: TX: Blake Toler (1), Jorge Gutierrez (1), Jake Orlando 2 (2); MN: Colin Quinn (1); Boxscore

==== Game 3: Washington 5, Minnesota 2 ====
August 21 8:00 pm EDT Lamade Stadium
Team	1	2	3	4	5	6	R	H	E
(Washington (state)) Washington ◄	0	0	2	0	3	0	5	5	2
Minnesota	2	0	0	0	0	0	2	3	1
WP: Ikaika Nahaku (1–0) LP: Talor Blustin (0–1) Sv: Dillon O'Grady (1); Home runs: WA: Casey Manning (1); MN: None; Notes: Minnesota is eliminated. Boxscore

==== Game 4: Texas 14, Connecticut 1 ====
August 22 8:00 pm EDT Lamade Stadium
Team	1	2	3	4	5	6	R	H	E
Texas ◄	1	7	4	2	–	–	14	13	0
Connecticut	0	0	1	0	–	–	1	4	3
WP: Mason Van Noort (2–0) LP: Eddie Magi (0–1) Sv: None; Home runs: TX: Beau Orlando (1); CT: None; Notes: Completed early due to mercy rule. Boxscore

==== Game 5: Washington 9, Connecticut 5 ====
August 24 8:00 pm EDT Lamade Stadium
Team	1	2	3	4	5	6	R	H	E
(Washington (state)) Washington ◄	2	0	2	0	2	3	9	14	0
Connecticut	0	0	3	0	2	0	5	9	2
WP: Hudson Byorick (1–0) LP: Jack Quinn (0–1) Sv: Robbie Wilson (1); Home runs: WA: Isaiah Hatch (1), Casey Manning (2); CT: Nick Nardone (1); Notes: Connecticut is eliminated. Boxscore

==== Game 6: Washington 7, Texas 4 ====
August 25 8:00 pm EDT Lamade Stadium
Team	1	2	3	4	5	6	R	H	E
Texas	1	0	3	0	0	0	4	4	3
(Washington (state)) Washington ◄	0	1	0	4	2	X	7	7	2
WP: Isaiah Hatch (1–1) LP: Jorge Gutierrez (0–1) Sv: None; Home runs: TX: Beau Orlando (2); WA: None; Boxscore

==== Game 7: Texas 7, Washington 5 ====
August 26 4:00 pm EDT Lamade Stadium
Team	1	2	3	4	5	6	R	H	E
Texas ◄	0	0	0	3	0	4	7	8	0
(Washington (state)) Washington	4	0	0	0	1	0	5	8	3
WP: Mason Van Noort (3–0) LP: Ikaika Nahaku (1–1) Sv: None; Home runs: TX: Mason Van Noort (1), Jaron Roblyer (1); WA: None; Notes: Washington is eliminated. Boxscore

=== Pool C ===
Games 1–3
-	Puerto Rico (F/4)	11
-	Germany	0
-	Japan	4
-	Mexico	2
Lower round 1
L1	Germany	2
L2	Mexico	11

Games 4–5
W1	Puerto Rico	2
W2	Japan	7
Lower final
W3	Mexico	4
L4	Puerto Rico	2

Games 6–7
W4	Japan	3	–
W5	Mexico	2	–

==== Game 1: Puerto Rico 11, Germany 0 ====
August 20 6:00 pm EDT Volunteer Stadium
Team	1	2	3	4	5	6	R	H	E
Germany	0	0	0	0	–	–	0	1	1
Puerto Rico ◄	2	5	2	2	–	–	11	8	0
WP: Jonathan Martínez (1–0) LP: Mackenzie Mueller (0–1) Sv: None; Home runs: GER: None; PUR: Yomar Valentin 2 (2), Victor Valentin (1), Bryan Figueroa (1), Joshuan Sandoval (1); Notes: Completed early due to mercy rule. Boxscore

==== Game 2: Japan 4, Mexico 2 ====
August 20 8:00 pm EDT Lamade Stadium
Team	1	2	3	4	5	6	R	H	E
Japan ◄	0	0	0	0	0	4	4	8	1
Mexico	0	0	1	0	0	1	2	4	0
WP: Natsuki Mizumachi (1–0) LP: Ricardo Puga (0–1) Sv: Ichiro Ogasawara (1); Home runs: JPN: Ginga Maruoka (1); MEX: Eduardo Mata (1); Boxscore

==== Game 3: Mexico 11, Germany 2 ====
August 22 Noon EDT Volunteer Stadium
Team	1	2	3	4	5	6	R	H	E
Mexico ◄	0	0	4	1	3	3	11	13	1
Germany	0	0	1	0	1	0	2	4	1
WP: Aldo Buendia (1–0) LP: Daniel Harrington (0–1) Sv: None; Home runs: MEX: Enrique Penaloza 2 (2), Ricardo Puga (1); GER: Tyler Ullmann (1), Kaleb Stokes (1); Notes: Germany is eliminated. Boxscore

==== Game 4: Japan 7, Puerto Rico 2 ====
August 22 6:00 pm EDT Volunteer Stadium
Team	1	2	3	4	5	6	R	H	E
Japan ◄	3	4	0	0	0	0	7	4	0
Puerto Rico	0	2	0	0	0	0	2	6	3
WP: Ryusuke Ikeda (1–0) LP: Javier Rodriguez (0–1) Sv: None; Home runs: JPN: None; PUR: None; Boxscore

==== Game 5: Mexico 4, Puerto Rico 2 ====
August 23 4:00 pm EDT Lamade Stadium
Team	1	2	3	4	5	6	R	H	E
Puerto Rico	0	0	2	0	0	0	2	5	7
Mexico	0	0	2	0	2	X	4	5	2
WP: Eduardo Mata (1–0) LP: Jonathan Martínez (1–1) Sv: None; Home runs: PUR: None; MEX: None; Notes: Puerto Rico is eliminated. Boxscore

==== Game 6: Japan 3, Mexico 2 ====
August 24 6:00 pm EDT Volunteer Stadium
Team	1	2	3	4	5	6	R	H	E
Japan ◄	0	0	2	1	0	0	3	6	0
Mexico	1	1	0	0	0	0	2	2	1
WP: Konan Tomori (1–0) LP: Hugo Mendiola Jr (0–1) Sv: Ichiro Ogasawara (2); Home runs: JPN: Kaname Shinozaki (1); MEX: Ricardo Puga (2), Enrique Penaloza (3); Notes: Mexico is eliminated. Boxscore

=== Pool D ===
Games 1–3
-	Panama	2
-	Canada	4
-	Chinese Taipei (F/4)	18
-	Saudi Arabia	0
Lower round 1
L1	Panama (F/4)	13
L2	Saudi Arabia	0

Games 4–5
W1	Canada	0
W2	Chinese Taipei (F/4)	23
Lower final
W3	Panama	4
L4	Canada	2

Games 6–7
W4	Chinese Taipei	5	–
W5	Panama	1	–

==== Game 1: Canada 4, Panama 2 ====
August 21 1:00 pm EDT Volunteer Stadium
Team	1	2	3	4	5	6	R	H	E
Canada ◄	0	1	2	0	1	0	4	6	2
Panama	0	0	1	0	1	0	2	6	1
WP: Lucas Soper (1–0) LP: Javier Garcia (0–1) Sv: None; Home runs: CAN: None; PAN: Francisco Gonzalez (1); Boxscore

==== Game 2: Chinese Taipei 18, Saudi Arabia 0 ====
August 21 6:00 pm EDT Volunteer Stadium
Team	1	2	3	4	5	6	R	H	E
Chinese Taipei ◄	6	2	8	2	–	–	18	16	1
Saudi Arabia	0	0	0	0	–	–	0	0	2
WP: Po-Jung Tseng (1–0) LP: Deji Ogunsola (0–1) Sv: None; Home runs: TPE: None; SAU: None; Notes: Completed early due to mercy rule. Boxscore

==== Game 3: Panama 13, Saudi Arabia 0 ====
August 22 3:00 pm EDT Volunteer Stadium
Team	1	2	3	4	5	6	R	H	E
Saudi Arabia	0	0	0	0	–	–	0	3	2
Panama ◄	5	3	5	X	–	–	13	13	1
WP: Sebastian Carrizo (1–0) LP: Braden Barnett (0–1) Sv: None; Home runs: SAU: None; PAN: None; Notes: Completed early due to mercy rule. Saudi Arabia is eliminated. Boxscore

==== Game 4: Chinese Taipei 23, Canada 0 ====
August 23 2:00 pm EDT Volunteer Stadium
Team	1	2	3	4	5	6	R	H	E
Chinese Taipei ◄	6	7	7	3	–	–	23	15	0
Canada	0	0	0	0	–	–	0	1	4
WP: Yung-Heng Li Wu (1–0) LP: Lichel Hirakawa-Kao (0–1) Sv: None; Home runs: TPE: Hsun-Hao Shih 2 (2); CAN: None; Notes: Completed early due to mercy rule. Boxscore

==== Game 5: Panama 4, Canada 2 ====
August 24 2:00 pm EDT Lamade Stadium
Team	1	2	3	4	5	6	R	H	E
Canada	0	0	1	0	0	1	2	4	3
Panama ◄	1	0	1	2	0	X	4	7	0
WP: Luis Bazan (1–0) LP: Lichel Hirakawa-Kao (0–2) Sv: None; Home runs: CAN: Zach Chaba (1); PAN: Rafael DeLeon (1); Notes: Canada is eliminated. Boxscore

==== Game 6: Chinese Taipei 5, Panama 1 ====
August 25 4:00 pm EDT Volunteer Stadium
Team	1	2	3	4	5	6	R	H	E
Chinese Taipei ◄	0	0	1	0	4	0	5	6	0
Panama	1	0	0	0	0	0	1	5	1
WP: Shao-Fei Huang (1–0) LP: Irving Indunis (0–1) Sv: None; Home runs: TPE: None; PAN: None; Notes: Panama is eliminated. Boxscore

=== Crossover games ===
==== Game A: Germany 2, Minnesota 1 ====
August 23 Noon EDT Lamade Stadium
Team	1	2	3	4	5	6	R	H	E
Minnesota	1	0	0	0	0	0	1	9	1
Germany ◄	1	0	0	0	1	X	2	5	0
WP: Jonathon Oswald (1–0) LP: Nick Tuel (0–2) Sv: None; Home runs: MN: None; GER: None; Boxscore

==== Game B: New Jersey 10, Saudi Arabia 0 ====
August 24 Noon EDT Lamade Stadium
Team	1	2	3	4	5	6	R	H	E
New Jersey ◄	2	2	0	0	2	4	10	13	0
Saudi Arabia	0	0	0	0	0	0	0	2	2
WP: Kevin Blum (1–0) LP: Bradlee Sumner (0–1) Sv: None; Home runs: NJ: Kevin Blum (2), Russell Petranto (1), Patrick Marinaccio (1), Joey Rose (2); SAU: None; Boxscore

== Elimination round ==
Int'l and US championships
August 28 - Lamade (F/7)
Japan	3
Chinese Taipei	2
August 28 - Lamade (F/5)
Hawaii	10
Texas	0

LLWS championship
August 29 - Lamade
Japan	4
(United States) Hawaii	1
Consolation game
August 29 - Lamade (F/4)
Chinese Taipei	14
(United States) Texas	2

=== Semifinals ===
==== United States championship: Hawaii 10, Texas 0 ====
August 28 4:40 pm EDT Lamade Stadium
Team	1	2	3	4	5	6	R	H	E
Texas	0	0	0	0	0	–	0	2	0
Hawaii ◄	4	0	3	0	3	–	10	10	0
WP: Ezra Heleski (2–0) LP: Beau Orlando (0–1) Sv: None; Home runs: TX: None; HI: Noah Shackles (1); Notes: Completed early due to mercy rule. Texas is eliminated. Boxscore

=== Consolation game ===
August 29 11:00 am EDT Lamade Stadium
Team	1	2	3	4	5	6	R	H	E
Chinese Taipei ◄	9	1	3	1	–	–	14	14	1
Texas	0	0	2	0	–	–	2	4	2
WP: Wei-Chih Chen (1–0) LP: Jaron Roblyer (0–1) Sv: None; Home runs: TPE: Hsun-Hao Shih (3); TX: Beau Orlando (3); Notes: Completed early due to mercy rule. Boxscore

=== World Championship Game ===
August 29 3:00 pm EDT Lamade Stadium
Team	1	2	3	4	5	6	R	H	E
Japan ◄	0	1	0	1	0	2	4	5	2
Hawaii	0	0	0	1	0	0	1	4	0
WP: Ryusuke Ikeda (2–0) LP: Cody Maltezo (0–1) Sv: Ichiro Ogasawara (3); Home runs: JPN: Konan Tomori (1); HI: None; Boxscore
