= Isle of the Senecas =

Island in the Mohawk River in New York, United States

- Location within New York

Geography
- Location: Mohawk River
- Coordinates: 42°49′14″N 73°57′51″W
- Highest elevation: 217 ft (66.1 m)

Administration
- United States
- State: New York
- County: Schenectady
- Towns: Glenville

Isle of the Senecas, also called Little Island, is an island in the Mohawk River south of Scotia in Schenectady County, New York.
