= 2010 Little League World Series =

Children's baseball tournament

Tournament details
- Dates: August 20–August 29
- Teams: 16

Final positions
- Champions: Edogawa Minami Little League; Tokyo, Japan
- Runners-up: Waipio Little League (United States) Waipahu, Hawaii

The 2010 Little League World Series was held in South Williamsport, Pennsylvania. It began on August 20 and ended on August 29. Eight teams from the United States and eight from throughout the world competed in the 64th edition of the Little League World Series. In the championship game, the international champions from Tokyo, Japan, defeated the United States champions from Waipahu, Hawaii. It was the seventh championship for Japan overall, and the first since 2003.

Activision released a video game in advance of the event, Little League World Series Baseball 2010.

== Tournament changes ==
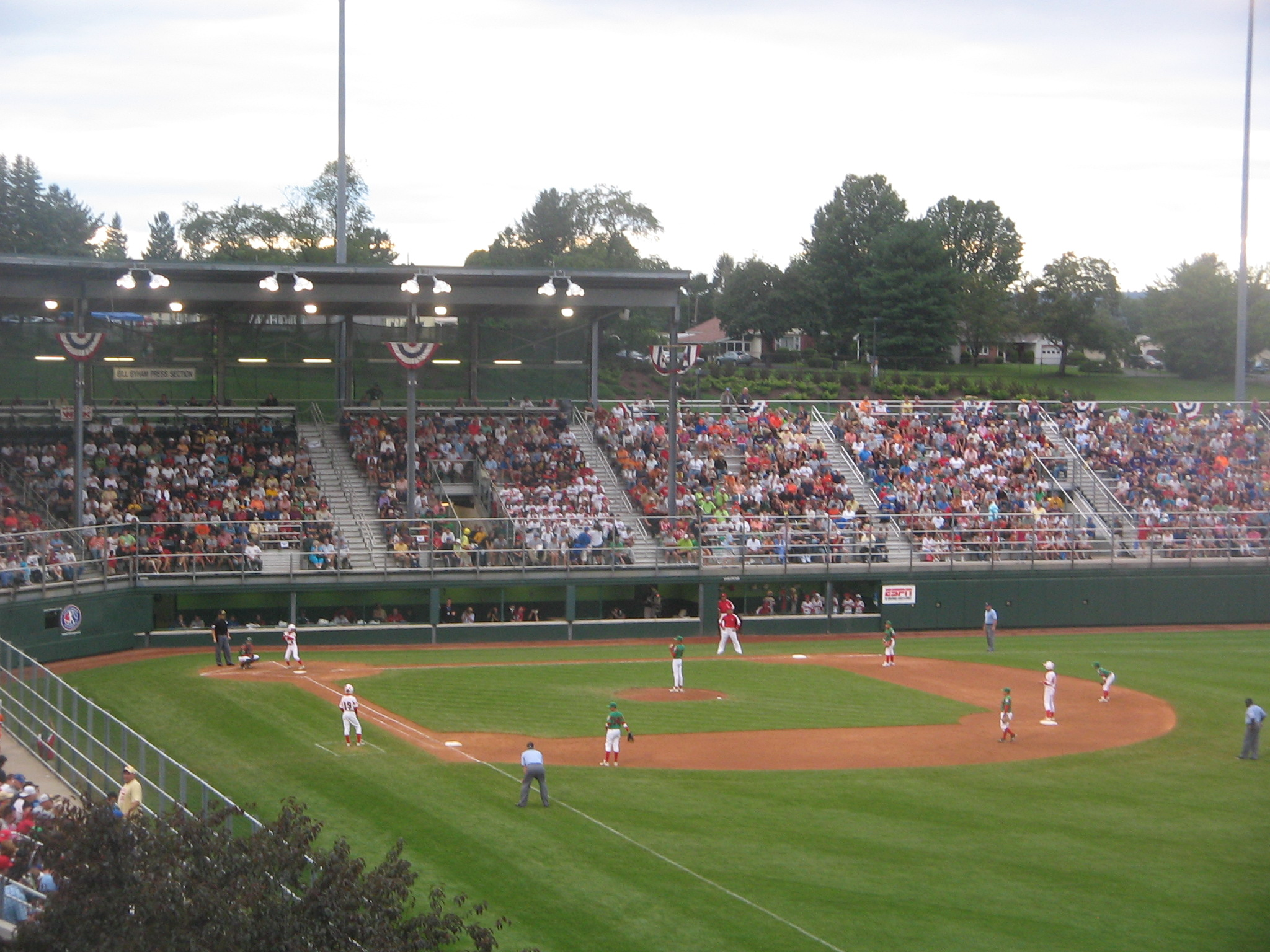
Japan vs. Mexico in a Pool C game

On April 14, 2010, Little League announced that starting in 2010, round robin play would be replaced by a double-elimination bracket in each pool. The winners of each pool will advance to single elimination US and International Championship games and the winners of those games will advance to the World Championship game. Every team will play a minimum of three games: the four teams that lose their first two games will cross over and play special US vs. International games.

On August 2, 2010, it was announced that instant replay would be expanded. The system, which was first used in 2008, now includes force outs, tags along the base paths, missed bases, and hit batters as plays that are subject to review. Previously, only plays in which a dead ball would have resulted were able to be reviewed. Additionally, team managers are now allowed to challenge plays if the umpires have not already called for a replay. Before losing the right to challenge, managers are allowed only one unsuccessful challenge in the first six innings of a game, as well as one unsuccessful challenge in extra innings. Challenges must be made after the play in question and before the next pitch. A "replay team" located in an office at Howard J. Lamade Stadium will judge all plays under review. The first challenge in LLWS history that resulted in an original ruling being overturned occurred on August 21, the second day of the tournament. Prior to the championship game, instant replay had been used 16 times with 8 calls being overturned while the other 8 were upheld. The average amount of time needed for all reviews was 52 seconds.

== Teams ==
Pool A	Pool B	Pool C	Pool D
(Ohio) Hamilton, Ohio; Great Lakes Region; West Side Little League	(Minnesota) Plymouth, Minnesota; Midwest Region; Plymouth/New Hope Little League	(Puerto Rico) Manati, Puerto Rico; Caribbean Region; Jose M. Rodriguez Little League	Kaohsiung, Chinese Taipei (Taiwan); Asia-Pacific Region; Fu-Hsing Little League
(New Jersey) Toms River, New Jersey; Mid-Atlantic Region; Toms River National Little League	(Connecticut) Fairfield, Connecticut; New England Region; Fairfield American Little League	(Germany) Ramstein Air Base, Germany; Europe Region; KMC American Little League	Vancouver, British Columbia; Canada Region; Little Mountain Little League
(Georgia (U.S. state)) Columbus, Georgia; Southeast Region; Columbus Northern Little League	(Washington (state)) Auburn, Washington; Northwest Region; Auburn Little League	Tokyo, Japan; Japan Region; Edogawa Minami Little League	Chitré, Panama; Latin America Region; Chitré Little League
(Hawaii) Waipahu, Hawaii; West Region; Waipio Little League	(Texas) Pearland, Texas; Southwest Region; Pearland White Little League	Nuevo Laredo, Tamaulipas; Mexico Region; Oriente Little League	(Saudi Arabia) Dhahran, Saudi Arabia; MEA Region; Arabian American Little League

- Taiwan participates under the name Chinese Taipei in many sporting events, including Little League Baseball (LLB).

== Results ==
=== United States ===
==== Pool A ====
Games 1–3
-	Ohio	16
-	New Jersey	6
-	(Georgia (U.S. state)) Georgia	6
-	Hawaii	2
Lower round 1
L1	New Jersey	1
L2	Hawaii	3

Games 4–5
W1	Ohio	0
W2	(Georgia (U.S. state)) Georgia	6
Lower final
W3	Hawaii	6
L4	Ohio	4

Games 6–7
W4	(Georgia (U.S. state)) Georgia	4	5
W5	Hawaii	7	12

==== Pool B ====
Games 1–3
-	Connecticut	3
-	(Washington (state)) Washington	1
-	Minnesota	8
-	Texas	10
Lower round 1
L1	(Washington (state)) Washington	5
L2	Minnesota	2

Games 4–5
W1	Connecticut	1
W2	Texas (F/4)	14
Lower final
W3	(Washington (state)) Washington	9
L4	Connecticut	5

Games 6–7
W4	Texas	4	7
W5	(Washington (state)) Washington	7	5

=== International ===
==== Pool C ====
Games 1–3
-	Puerto Rico (F/4)	11
-	Germany	0
-	Japan	4
-	Mexico	2
Lower round 1
L1	Germany	2
L2	Mexico	11

Games 4–5
W1	Puerto Rico	2
W2	Japan	7
Lower final
W3	Mexico	4
L4	Puerto Rico	2

Games 6–7
W4	Japan	3	–
W5	Mexico	2	–

==== Pool D ====
Games 1–3
-	Panama	2
-	Canada	4
-	Chinese Taipei (F/4)	18
-	Saudi Arabia	0
Lower round 1
L1	Panama (F/4)	13
L2	Saudi Arabia	0

Games 4–5
W1	Canada	0
W2	Chinese Taipei (F/4)	23
Lower final
W3	Panama	4
L4	Canada	2

Games 6–7
W4	Chinese Taipei	5	–
W5	Panama	1	–

=== Crossover games ===
Teams that lost their first two games played a crossover game against a team from the other side of the bracket that also lost its first two games. These games were labeled Game A and Game B. This provided teams who were already eliminated the opportunity to play a third game.

Game A
August 23 – Lamade Stadium
Minnesota	1
Germany	2

Game B
August 24 – Lamade Stadium
New Jersey	10
Saudi Arabia	0

=== Championship games ===
Int'l and US championships
August 28 – 1:00 pm EDT - Lamade
Japan (F/7)	3
Chinese Taipei	2
August 28 – 4:40 pm EDT - Lamade
Hawaii	10
Texas	0

LLWS championship
August 29 – 3:00 pm EDT - Lamade
Japan	4
(United States) Hawaii	1
Consolation game
August 29 – 11:00 am EDT - Lamade
Chinese Taipei	14
Texas	2

2010 Little League World Series Champions
Edogawa Minami Little League

Tokyo, Japan

== Champions path ==
The Edogawa Minami LL reached the LLWS with a record of 8 wins, 1 loss, and 1 tie. In total, their record was 13–1–1, their only loss coming against Musashi-Fuchu.

Round	Opposition	Result
All-Tokyo Tournament
Opening Round	Meguro Higahi LL	10–0
Winner's Bracket Round 2	Tokyo Kitasuna LL	7–3
Winner's Bracket Quarterfinals	Tokyo Johoku LL	7–4
Winner's Bracket Semifinals	Musashi-Fuchu LL	3–5
Elimination Bracket Quarterfinals	Itabashi LL	5–3
Round-Robin Playoff	Tokyo Kitasuna LL	7–7
Round-Robin Playoff	Musashi-Fuchu LL	6–2
Japan Regional
Opening Round	Tokyo Nakanyo LL	9–3
Quarterfinals	Iida LL	25–4
Semifinals	Hamamatsu Minami LL	2–0
Japan Championship	Hirosaki Aomori LL	8–4
