= Abraham Glen House =

Historic house in New York, United States

- U.S. National Register of Historic Places
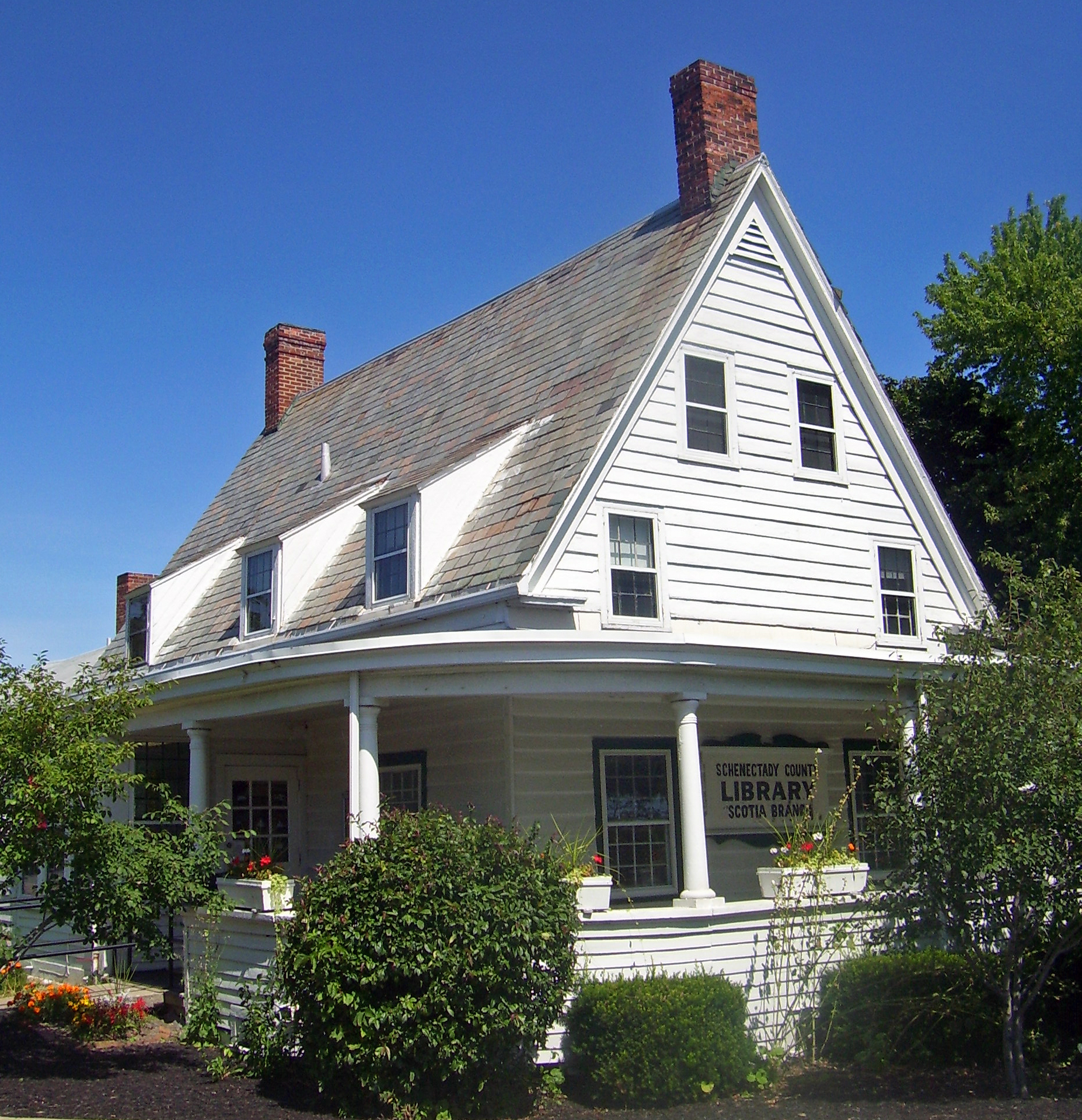
- South profile and west elevation, 2008

- Location within New York
- Location: Scotia, New York
- Nearest city: Schenectady
- Coordinates: 42°49′27″N 73°57′34″W
- Area: less than one acre
- Built: 1730s
- Architectural style: Dutch Colonial
- NRHP reference No.: 04000708
- Added to NRHP: July 14, 2004

The Abraham Glen House is located on Mohawk Avenue (NY 5) in Scotia, New York, United States. It is a white frame house from the 18th century that is currently used as the local branch of the Schenectady County public library system.

Built in the 1730s, it is a rare surviving example in the region of a Dutch Colonial heavy timber frame house. It was extensively modified at the beginning of the 20th century but still retains its basic form and original materials. In 2004 it was listed on the National Register of Historic Places.

== Building ==
The house is situated in Collins Park, on the north side of Route 5 just west of the Western Gateway Bridge which crosses the Mohawk River to nearby Schenectady. It is aligned north–south, giving it a diagonal orientation from the road. Mature trees screen it on several sides. There is a parking lot to the north, accessible from nearby Collins Street, and a baseball field to the northeast.

Its main block is a two-and-a-half-story rectangular (20 by 33 feet (6.1 by 10.1 m)) steeply pitched gable-roofed frame house on a mortared fieldstone basement. Two wings extend from the north end, both built later on. The larger is one and a half stories high, with full basement. A one-story storage wing projects from its north end.

Mortise and tenon joints were used in the framing. Rafters rest on the roof plate. The slate-shingled roof is pierced by brick chimneys at either end and three shed dormer windows on both east and west elevations. A wraparound porch on the first story has turned posts and is enclosed on the east side. Siding includes a variety of materials, from early weatherboard to later clapboard.

Inside, the first floor consists of two large rooms with the fireplaces in their original positions. The second story's bedrooms have been divided to create office space. The larger of the north wings has three rooms on the first floor and five on the second arranged around a narrow hallway. The smaller wing is a single room.

== History ==
Scotia owes its name to Alexander Lindsey, the only one of the original founders of Schenectady who was not Dutch. He was a Scotsman who, after taking refuge in the Netherlands, emigrated to New Netherland. There he obtained a patent to land on the north side of the Mohawk.

Upon his death, his three sons divided the estate, which had been named Scotia for Lindsey's native country, and changed their last names to Glen in Scotland's honor (this led to the surrounding town taking the name of Glenville, as well). Later, one of those sons dictated in his own will that a house be built on his property for his son Abraham.

This, the main block of the current building, was erected around 1730. Its vernacular Dutch framing is responsible for its steeply pitched roof. Masonry fragments found in the basement suggest that at the time of its construction it may have the standard Dutch-style jambless fireplaces.

The larger of the northern wings was built at some yet-undetermined time around the end of the 18th century. The Glen descendants continued to own the house until 1842, when it was sold to Charles and James Collins. The two continued to farm the land and harvest ice from the nearby lake.

In 1880 James Collins converted the land around the house into a garden and landscaped park. When the last member of the family died in 1924, the village acquired the property. Five years later, in 1930, a new village library was opened in the house. Since 1948 it has been part of the county library system. During the 1980s the interior was renovated and, on the upper floors, its layout altered.

== See also ==
- National Register of Historic Places listings in Schenectady County, New York
