= Scotia-Glenville High School =

Location
- 1 Tartan Way; Scotia, New York, 12302; United States
- Coordinates: 42.8359°N 73.9732°W

Information
- Type: Public
- Established: 1958
- Principal: Peter J. Bednarek
- Teaching staff: 60.86 (FTE)
- Enrollment: 689 (2024-2025)
- Student to teacher ratio: 11.32
- Colors: Crimson and White
- Yearbook: The Acropolis
- Team Name: Tartans
- Website: www.scotiaglenvilleschools.org

Scotia-Glenville High School is a public high school in Scotia, New York, United States. It is the only high school operated by the Scotia-Glenville Central School District. The school is located in a large suburb of the city of Schenectady, New York. The school's athletic mascot is the "Tartan," depicted as a Scottish bag-piper.

== History ==
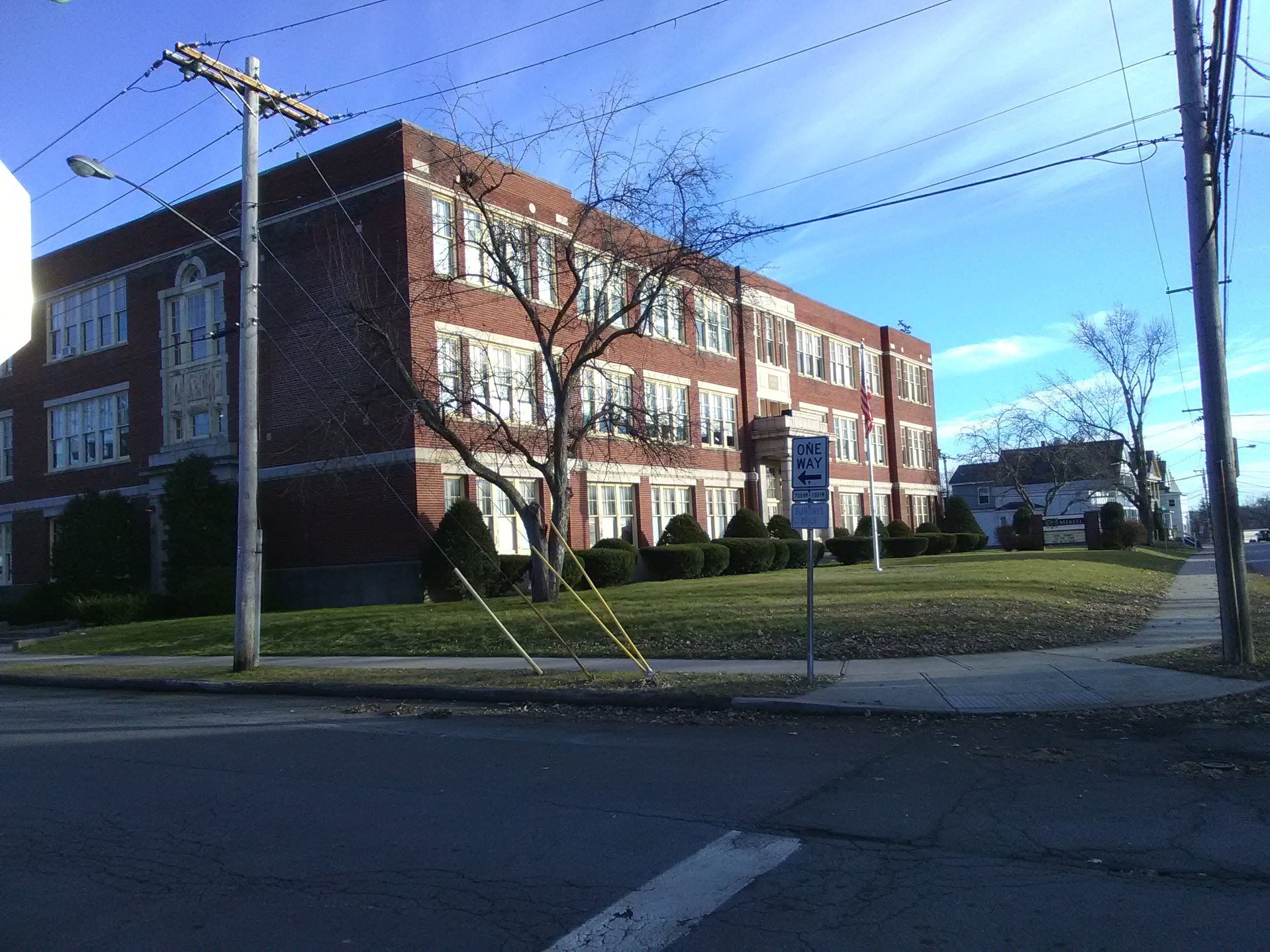
The former site of Scotia High School in 2019. Today, it serves as a private Christian school.

In 1905, the 1st high school was built in Scotia, with the first class graduating 9 students in 1910. In the same year of the 1st high school graduation, the district built the Mohawk School, named after the easternmost Iroquois tribe. The building still stands on S Ten Broeck Street, however today it is a center for early childhood education.

Following World War II, during the governorship of Thomas E. Dewey, a series of new construction projects began in the district to meet the growing needs of educating children during the mid-20th century baby boom. The building which houses the current Scotia-Glenville High School first opened in 1958 .

In March 1999, the community approved a multi-million dollar construction project that added a new high school gym, science classroom wing, and music area to the high school. Scotia-Glenville Junior High School (grades 7–8) became Scotia-Glenville Middle School (grades 6, 7, and 8) in 2001. Today, Scotia-Glenville High School has a total enrollment of 782 students across 4 grades and an 89% graduation rate. Scotia-Glenville High School has a total enrollment of 782 students across 4 grades and an 89% graduation rate. In 2013, Scotia-Glenville became the 1st school district in Schenectady County to install to solar panels on its buildings and bus garage for energy, saving an estimated $1 million in energy costs over the next 2 decades.

== Origin of the "Tartan" as the School's Mascot ==
The mascot of Scotia-Glenville High School is the "Tartan", depicted as a bagpiper from the Scottish Highlands wearing a traditional tartan outfit. This is because Alexander Lindsay Glen (1605-1685), a native of Fife, Scotland, was one of the first European settlers in the area. The name "Tartans" refers to Glen's Scottish heritage by referencing a traditional textile pattern from Scotland. Additionally, Glen named his estate "Nova Scotia," the Latin translation of "New Scotland," in memory of the land of his birth. The Town of Glenville is similarly named after Alexander Lindsay Glen.

The Scotia-Glenville area of Upstate New York has been populated at various times by the Mohawk people (members of the Iroquois Confederacy or Haudenosaunee), Dutch colonists in New Netherland, colonists of the British Empire, and finally was integrated into the State of New York after the American Revolution. Glen, also known as "Sanders," a shortened version of "Alexander," had acquired the present-day area in the Scotia-Glenville school district from the Dutch in the 1650s. In 1661, Glenville became the site of the first continuous European settlement in the Mohawk Valley, and was part of some of the last great struggles between the Mohawk and Mohegan peoples for control of the Mohawk Valley. Glen, as one of the early settlers this part of the Dutch colony of New Netherland, housed victims of the Schenectady Massacre. In reference to this legacy, Scotia-Glenville High School holds its junior-senior prom at the historic Glen Sanders Mansion, a 1713 farmstead built by Alexander Lindsay Glen's son, located in the village of Scotia, New York.

== Athletics ==
| Boys sports | Girls sports |
|---|---|
| Basketball | Basketball |
| Baseball | Softball |
| Ice hockey | Field hockey |
| Football | Cheerleading |
| Bowling | Bowling |
| Lacrosse | Lacrosse |
| Cross Country | Cross Country |
| Golf | Golf |
| Wrestling | Swimming |
| Skiing (Nordic) | Skiing (Nordic) |
| Soccer | Soccer |
| Tennis | Tennis |
| Track & Field | Track & Field |
| Indoor Track | Track & Field |
| Volleyball | Volleyball |

Scotia-Glenville's varsity boys' basketball program won consecutive state championships as part of the New York State Public High School Athletic Association for 2014 and 2015 and was the Federation Tournament champion in 2015. Scotia-Glenville was the first Section II boys' basketball team to ever repeat as champions. The Tartans boys basketball program competes at the Class A level. Other than its championship-winning boys' basketball program, Scotia-Glenville offers a full array of interscholastic sports from modified to varsity levels. In most sports, its athletic teams compete as members of the Foothills Council of Section II.

=== Boys Basketball Sectional titles (Section II, Class A) ===
1975, 2009, 2012, 2013, 2014, 2015

=== Boys Basketball PHSAA titles, Class A ===
2014, 2015

=== Boys Basketball Federation Tournament of Champions titles, Class A ===
2014

=== Boys Soccer Sectional titles (Section II, Class A) ===
2010

=== Boys Tennis Sectional titles (Section II, Class A/B) ===
2000, 2001, 2002, 2004, 2005, 2007, 2008, 2010, 2019

=== Girls Tennis Sectional titles (Section II, Class A/B) ===
2002, 2024, 2025

=== Girls Tennis NYSPHSAA Regional titles (Division 2) ===
2025

=== Girls Lacrosse Sectional titles (Section II, Class C) ===
2015, 2016

=== Girls Cross Country Sectional titles (Section II, Class B) ===
2022

== Alma Mater ==
Scotia-Glenville's Alma Mater, played during Commencement ceremonies and sports events, references the Scottish heritage of Alexander Lindsay Glen. The alma mater also refers to as well as the fighting spirit of Scotia's prominent athletic programs:

Verse one
Come now cheer for dear old Scotia,
Let your voices fill the air
Our hearts beat high with rapture,
As we see our colors fair.
In our work, and in our pleasure
For our high school we will fight.
While we cheer for dear old Scotia,'
And the Crimson and the White.
Verse two
We will wear our Tartan proudly,
As we battle through the game.
We will serve our Alma Mater
And protect her from all shame.
May our friendships last forever.
May our future years be bright.
Let’s remember dear old Scotia
And the Crimson and the White.'

== Scotia-Glenville High School in Film ==
The area across from Scotia-Glenville High School, including an ice cream shop, was depicted in the 2012 film The Place Beyond the Pines, starring Ryan Gosling, Bradley Cooper, Mahershala Ali and Eva Mendes. Other areas depicted in the film near to the High School include the First National Bank of Scotia.

== Notable alumni ==
- Joe Cremo, '15 college basketball player, SUNY Albany and Villanova University

== Graduation statistics ==
- Four-year colleges: 82 (44 percent)
- Two-year colleges: 58 (31 percent)
- Other / Unknown: 17 (9 percent)
- Employment: 23 (12 percent)
- Armed Services: 5 (2.7 percent)
- Vocational Training: 3 (1.6 percent)
