= Mohawk Valley Airport =

Former airport in Upstate New York

- IATA: none; ICAO: none; FAA LID: K13

Summary
- Airport type: Public
- Owner: Ray Marshall
- Serves: Scotia, New York
- Elevation AMSL: 240 ft / 73 m
- Coordinates: 42°52′05″N 074°01′43″W
- Interactive map of Mohawk Valley Airport

Runways
Direction	Length		Surface
Direction	ft	m	Surface
15/33	1,840	561	Turf

Statistics (2007)
- Aircraft operations: 750
- Source: FAA and NYSDOT

Mohawk Valley Airport (FAA LID: 31NK) was a privately owned, public-use airport located three nautical miles (6 km) northwest of Scotia, a village in the Town of Glenville in Schenectady County, New York, United States.

== Facilities and aircraft ==
Mohawk Valley Airport covered an area of 44 acres (18 ha) at an elevation of 240 feet (73 m) above mean sea level. It had one runway designated 15/33 with a turf surface measuring 1,840 by 120 feet (561 x 37 m). For the 12-month period ending September 28, 2007, the airport had 750 aircraft operations, an average of 62 per month: 93% general aviation and 7% military.

The airport closed in 2010. Entire site is now the Bhatia Farm, LLC. MP, Haresh Bhatia.
