= Seeley Farmhouse =

Historic house in New York, United States

- U.S. National Register of Historic Places
- Location within New York Location within the United States
- Location: 2 Freeman's Bridge Rd., Glenville, New York
- Coordinates: 42°49′54″N 73°55′50″W
- Area: less than one acre
- Built: 1850
- Architectural style: Greek Revival, Vernacular Greek Revival
- NRHP reference No.: 78001909
- Added to NRHP: May 23, 1978

Seeley Farmhouse, also known as Little Richard's Tavern, is a historic home located at Glenville in Schenectady County, New York. The L-shaped building consists of two main blocks. The front block took its present form about 1850 and is in an atypical Greek Revival style. It consists of a 2-story central pedimented pavilion with flanking 1 1/2-story wings.

It was added to the National Register of Historic Places in 1978.
