= Glenville District No. 5 Schoolhouse =

- U.S. National Register of Historic Places
- Location within New York Location within the United States
- Location: 2140 Potter Rd., Glenville, New York
- Coordinates: 42°56′22″N 74°04′53″W
- Area: .52 acres (0.21 ha)
- Built: c. 1825
- NRHP reference No.: 14000226
- Added to NRHP: May 19, 2014

Glenville District No. 5 Schoolhouse, also known as Green Corners School, is a historic one-room school building located at Glenville, Schenectady County, New York. It was built about 1825, and is a small one-story, rectangular brick building. It measures approximately 24 feet by 20 feet. It rests on a stone foundation and is surmounted by a gable roof with overhanging eaves. It functioned as a public school for first through eighth grades until it closed in 1946. The building was restored in 1976.

It was added to the National Register of Historic Places in 2011.
