= Little Island =

Little Island can refer to:

== Geographical areas ==
Australia

- Little Island (South Australia)
- Little Island (Tasmania)
- Little Island (Western Australia)

Canada

- Little Island (Lake Kagawong), Ontario

Ireland

- Little Island, Cork
- Little Island, Waterford

United Kingdom

- Little Island, Anguilla

United States

- Little Island (Alabama), Alabama
- Little Island (Napa County), California
- Little Island (Massachusetts), Massachusetts
- Little Island (Crab Alley Bay), Maryland
- Little Island (Sillery Bay), Maryland
- Little Island (Michigan), Michigan
- Little Island at Pier 55, New York, artificial island and public park
- Isle of the Senecas, New York, also known as Little Island
- Little Island (Washington), one of the San Juan Islands
- Little Island (District of Columbia), adjacent to Theodore Roosevelt Island in Washington, D.C.

== Popular culture ==
- The Little Island (book), a 1946 children's picture book by Margaret Wise Brown (writing as Golden McDonald) and Leonard Weisgard
- The Little Island (film), a 1958 British animated short film
- Little Island Comics, a comic book shop for children in Toronto, Ontario, Canada
- "Little Island", a song by Randy Newman from the musical Randy Newman's Faust

== Other ==
- Little Island, an Irish publishing company
