= Swart House and Tavern =

Historic house in New York, United States

- U.S. National Register of Historic Places
- Location within New York Location within the United States
- Location: 130 Johnson Rd., Glenville, New York
- Coordinates: 42°53′10″N 74°3′2″W
- Area: 1 acre (0.40 ha)
- Built: 1750
- Architectural style: Federal
- NRHP reference No.: 06001211
- Added to NRHP: January 4, 2007

Swart House and Tavern is a historic home and tavern located at Glenville in Schenectady County, New York. It consists of a long, 2-story, rectangular gable-roofed structure with a 1 1/2-story rear wing. The rear wing was built about 1750 and the building was substantially enlarged about 1792 in the Federal style. Also on the property is a stone masonry smokehouse.

It was listed on the National Register of Historic Places in 2007.

Born in the Schoharie Valley in 1718, Adam Swart did not move to Schenectady until his marriage to Catherine Van Patten in 1742. Their son Nicholas built the Swart Tavern in the late 18th century, a building which is still standing, but no longer in use as a tavern. A circa 1840 painting of the Swart Tavern is also on display.
