= Scotia Naval Supply Depot =

Coordinates: 42°50′24″N 73°59′9″W

Scotia Naval Supply Depot was a United States Navy supply depot located in Scotia, New York, from 1942 to 1971.

== Contaminantion ==
In 2010, the federal government acknowledged the lingering soil contamination, and is taking responsibility for cleaning up the pollution.

== Location ==
This is a 310-acre site near Thruway Exit 26.

=== Businesspark ===
The area was renamed after the Glenville Business and Technology Park. There are 20+ owners of parcels within the park. The largest landowner is the Schenectady County Industrial Development Agency with those properties operated by the Galesi Group.
