= Bishop Family Lustron House =

Historic house in New York, United States

- U.S. National Register of Historic Places
- Location within New York Location within the United States
- Location: 26 Slater Dr., Glenville, New York
- Coordinates: 42°53′20″N 73°54′52″W
- Area: 0.5 acres (0.20 ha)
- Built: 1949
- Architect: Stranlund, Carl; et al.
- Architectural style: Modern Movement, Westchester Deluxe Lustron
- MPS: Lustron Houses in New York MPS
- NRHP reference No.: 08000144
- Added to NRHP: March 6, 2008

The Bishop Family Lustron House is a historic Lustron house located at 26 Slater Drive in Glenville, Schenectady County, New York.

== Description and history ==
It was built in November 1949, and measures 31 feet by 35 feet on a poured concrete slab. The exterior is clad with two-foot by two-foot steel panels coated with "Dove Gray" colored porcelain enamel. It is a Westchester Deluxe two-bedroom model home.

It was added to the National Register of Historic Places on March 6, 2008.
