= Joe Cremo =

American basketball player (born 1996)

No. 24 – Gran Canaria
- Position: Shooting guard
- League: Primera FEB

Personal information
- Born: November 5, 1996 (age 30) Scotia, New York, U.S.
- Listed height: 6 ft 4 in (1.93 m)
- Listed weight: 190 lb (86 kg)

Career information
- High school: Scotia-Glenville (Scotia, New York)
- College: Albany (2015–2018); Villanova (2018–2019)
- NBA draft: 2019: undrafted
- Playing career: 2019–present

Career history
- 2019: Spa City Gamblers
- 2019–2020: Long Island Nets
- 2021–2022: Zornotza ST
- 2022–2024: CB Tizona
- 2024–2025: San Pablo Burgos
- 2025–2026: Básquet Coruña
- 2026–present: Gran Canaria

Career highlights
- First-team All-America East (2018); Second-team All-America East (2017); America East Sixth Man of the Year (2017); America East Rookie of the Year (2016)

Joseph Robert Cremo (born November 5, 1996) is an American professional basketball player for Gran Canaria of the Spanish Primera FEB. He played college basketball for the Albany Great Danes and the Villanova Wildcats.

== Early life and high school career ==
Cremo attended Scotia-Glenville High School, where he was coached by Jim Giammattei. He committed to Albany in his junior year. He was not highly recruited because he did not participate in AAU competition. Cremo won the 2014 state Class A Player of the Year award and won the Class A championship. Despite averaging 28.3 points, 11.5 rebounds, 4.2 assists and 3.8 steals per game as a senior, Cremo was not a finalist for New York Mr. Basketball.

== College career ==
As a freshman, he averaged 10.5 points per game. He was named the America East rookie of the year and sixth man of the year. Cremo averaged 15.8 points, 5.3 rebounds and 3.8 assists per game in his sophomore season. A highlight of his season was a 29-point performance on 9 of 14 shooting in a win against Colgate on December 10, 2016. He was named to the Second Team All-America East.

Cremo was named to the First Team All-America East as a junior at Albany. He scored a season-high 30 points on November 25, 2017, against Holy Cross. Cremo had 18 points on 6-of-14 shooting to go with five rebounds and three assists in a 70–69 loss to Louisville on December 20. Cremo averaged 17.8 points, 4.1 rebounds and 3.8 assists per game on a team that went 22–10. He shot 46 percent from 3-point range. Following the season, Cremo opted to take advantage of the NCAA's graduate transfer rule and transfer to a different school without sitting out a season. After visiting Kansas, Texas and Creighton, Cremo announced he was transferring to defending national champion Villanova, where he helped fill in for Donte DiVincenzo, who left for the NBA draft. “As soon as I stepped on campus, it felt like a family,” he said, praising coach Jay Wright and the returning players.

In his only season at Villanova, Cremo averaged 4.0 points, 1.8 rebounds and 1.2 assists per game and made five starts. He helped Villanova win the Big East regular season and tournament-championship. Cremo had a season-high 14 points in a 71–65 loss to St. John's, hitting four 3-pointers. After the season, he shared the Jake Nevin Award with teammate Collin Gillespie.

== Professional career ==
Cremo was selected in the fourth round of the 2019 NBA G League draft by the Long Island Nets. However, he was waived by the Nets in training camp. He signed with the Spa City Gamblers of the American Basketball Association. On December 12, 2019, he joined the Long Island Nets of the NBA G League. Cremo scored a season-high 16 points and had eight assists in a game against the Wisconsin Herd. He averaged 5.1 points, 2.6 assists and 1.7 rebounds per game with Long Island.

On July 25, 2021, Cremo signed with Zornotza ST of the LEB Plata. Cremo went on to play for CB Tizona and then local rivals San Pablo Burgos, before signing for Básquet Coruña of the Primera FEB in July 2025. On July 27, 2026, Cremo signed with Gran Canaria of the Primera FEB.
