= Little Mountain Historic District =

Historic district in South Carolina, United States

- U.S. National Register of Historic Places
- U.S. Historic district
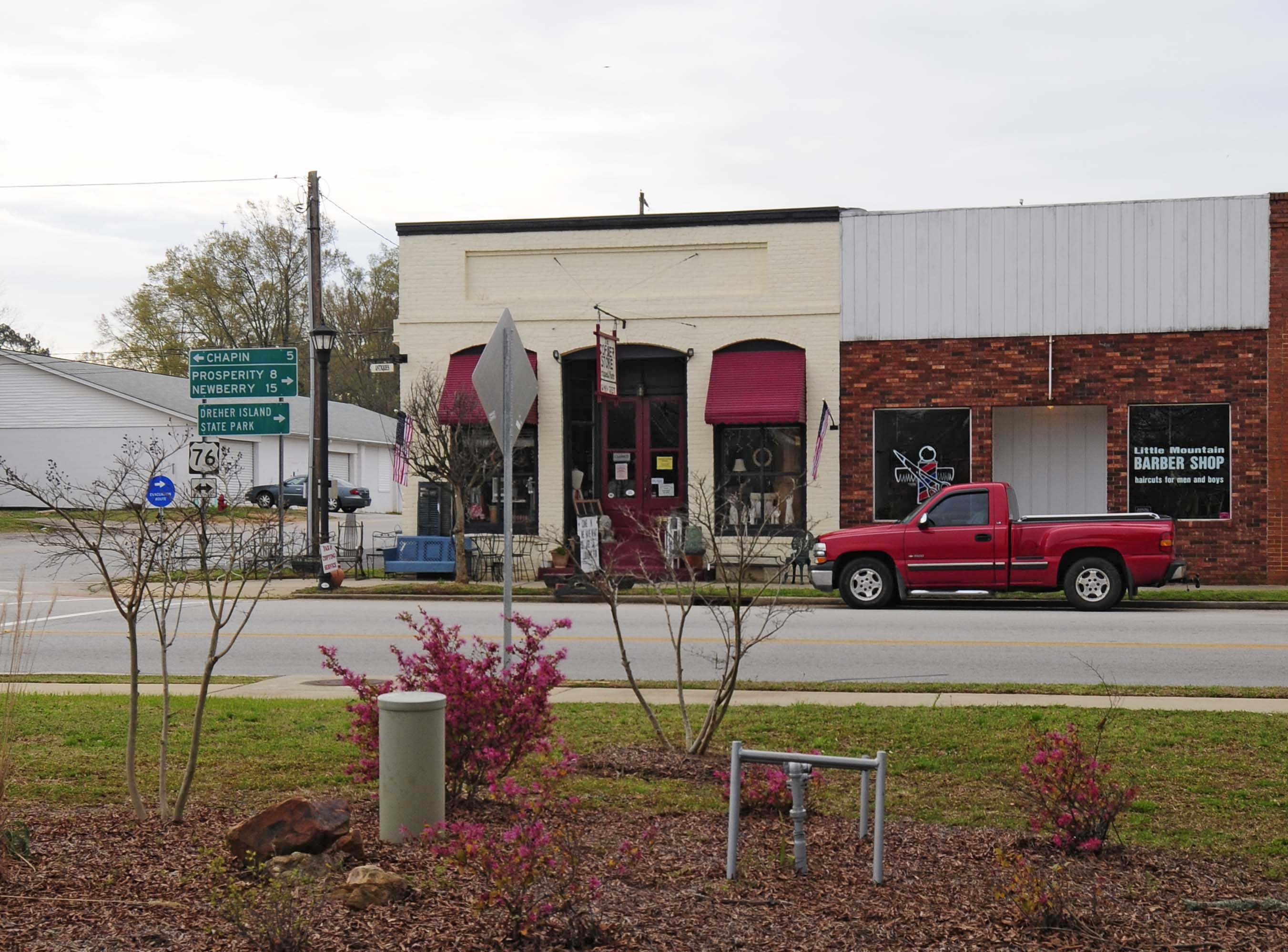
- Little Mountain Historic District, March 2012

- Location within South Carolina Location within the United States
- Location: Along portions of Pomaria, Church, Main and Mountain Sts., Little Mountain, South Carolina
- Coordinates: 34°11′49″N 81°24′49″W
- Area: 57 acres (23 ha)
- Built: 1890
- Architectural style: Late Victorian, Late 19th And 20th Century Revivals
- NRHP reference No.: 03000275
- Added to NRHP: April 18, 2003

Little Mountain Historic District is a national historic district located at Little Mountain, Newberry County, South Carolina. The district encompasses 50 contributing buildings and 2 contributing structures in the railroad town of Little Mountain. The buildings date from about 1890 to 1950 and include residences, businesses, and other institutional buildings. They include examples of the Gothic Revival, Neo-Classical, Colonial Revival, Victorian or Queen Anne, and Bungalow styles.

It was listed on the National Register of Historic Places in 2003.
