= Little Mountain (South Carolina) =

Mountain in the United States of America

Coordinates: 34°11′9.71″N 81°24′34.99″W

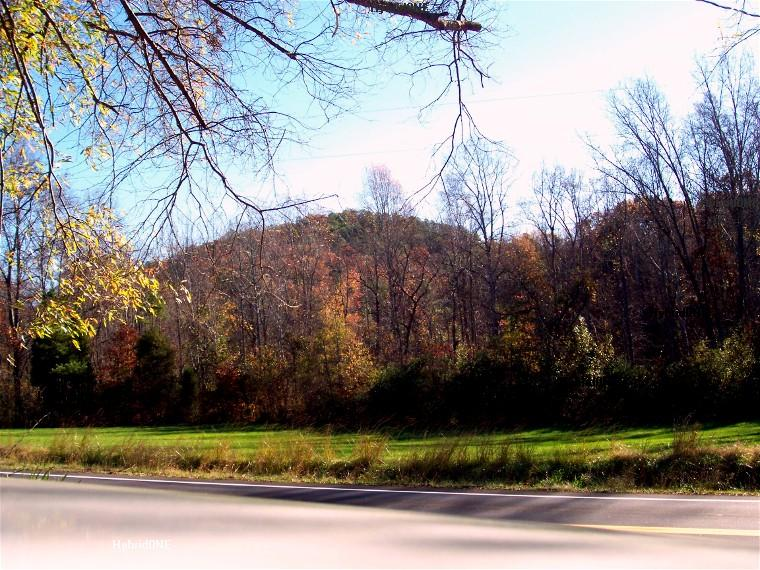
- Little Mountain from Wheeland Road

Highest point
- Elevation: 813 ft (248 m)

Dimensions
- Area: 1.5 square miles

Geography
- Location: Little Mountain, South Carolina, U.S.
- Topo map(s): USGS Little Mountain, SC

Little Mountain is a monadnock that is the highest point in the Midlands region of South Carolina. It has an elevation of 813 feet (247 m) above mean sea level and is located in southeastern Newberry County, about 25 miles from Columbia. The monadnock itself rises 300 feet above the surrounding belt of hills and is formed of Carolina slate.

In its early history (dating back to the 19th century) it was known as Ruff's Mountain and eventually took the name of the town that incorporated at its foot, Little Mountain. It was originally part of Lexington County until 1917 and currently has a radio tower that serves the northwestern exurban area of Columbia on its summit that reaches 1040 feet at its top.

== Demographics ==
According to the recent 2024 American census, the total population in Little Mountain (South Carolina) was recorded as 260 people with the composition of 92.98% White people and 7.02% African Americans.
