= Scotia, New York =

- Village
- Location in Schenectady County and the state of New York.
- Coordinates: 42°50′N 73°58′W
- Country: United States
- State: New York
- County: Schenectady
- Town: Glenville

Area
  - Total: 1.79 sq mi (4.63 km^{2})
  - Land: 1.69 sq mi (4.37 km^{2})
  - Water: 0.097 sq mi (0.25 km^{2})
- Elevation: 243 ft (74 m)

Population (2020)
  - Total: 7,272
  - Density: 4,308.0/sq mi (1,663.31/km^{2})
- Time zone: UTC-5 (Eastern (EST))
  - Summer (DST): UTC-4 (EDT)
- ZIP code: 12302
- Area code: 518
- FIPS code: 36-65893
- GNIS feature ID: 0964672
- Website: www.villageofscotia.org

Scotia is a village in Schenectady County, New York, United States, incorporated in 1904. The population was 7,272 at the 2020 census. Scotia is part of the town of Glenville, and is connected with the city of Schenectady by the Western Gateway Bridge over the Mohawk River.

== History ==
The land was purchased by Alexander Lindsay Glen, a native of Scotland, from the Mohawk people in the 17th century. Glen named his estate Scotia (Latin for "Scotland") after his home country. Scotia was the location of a military encampment during both the French and Indian War of 1754 and again during the War of 1812. During the 1800s, Scotia was known for its production of brooms, over 1 million annually for a time. In the 20th century, Scotia became a thriving bedroom community for employees of Schenectady employers such as General Electric. During World War II the Scotia Naval Supply Depot (1942–1971) employed over 2000 workers.

== Geography ==
According to the United States Census Bureau, the village has a total area of 1.8 square miles (4.6 km^{2}), of which 1.7 square miles (4.4 km^{2}) is land and 0.12 square miles (0.3 km^{2}), or 5.82%, is water.

== Demographics ==
Historical population
Census	Pop.	Note	%±
1880	222		—
1910	2,957		—
1920	4,358		47.4%
1930	7,437		70.7%
1940	7,960		7.0%
1950	7,812		−1.9%
1960	7,625		−2.4%
1970	7,370		−3.3%
1980	7,280		−1.2%
1990	7,359		1.1%
2000	7,957		8.1%
2010	7,729		−2.9%
2020	7,272		−5.9%
U.S. Decennial Census

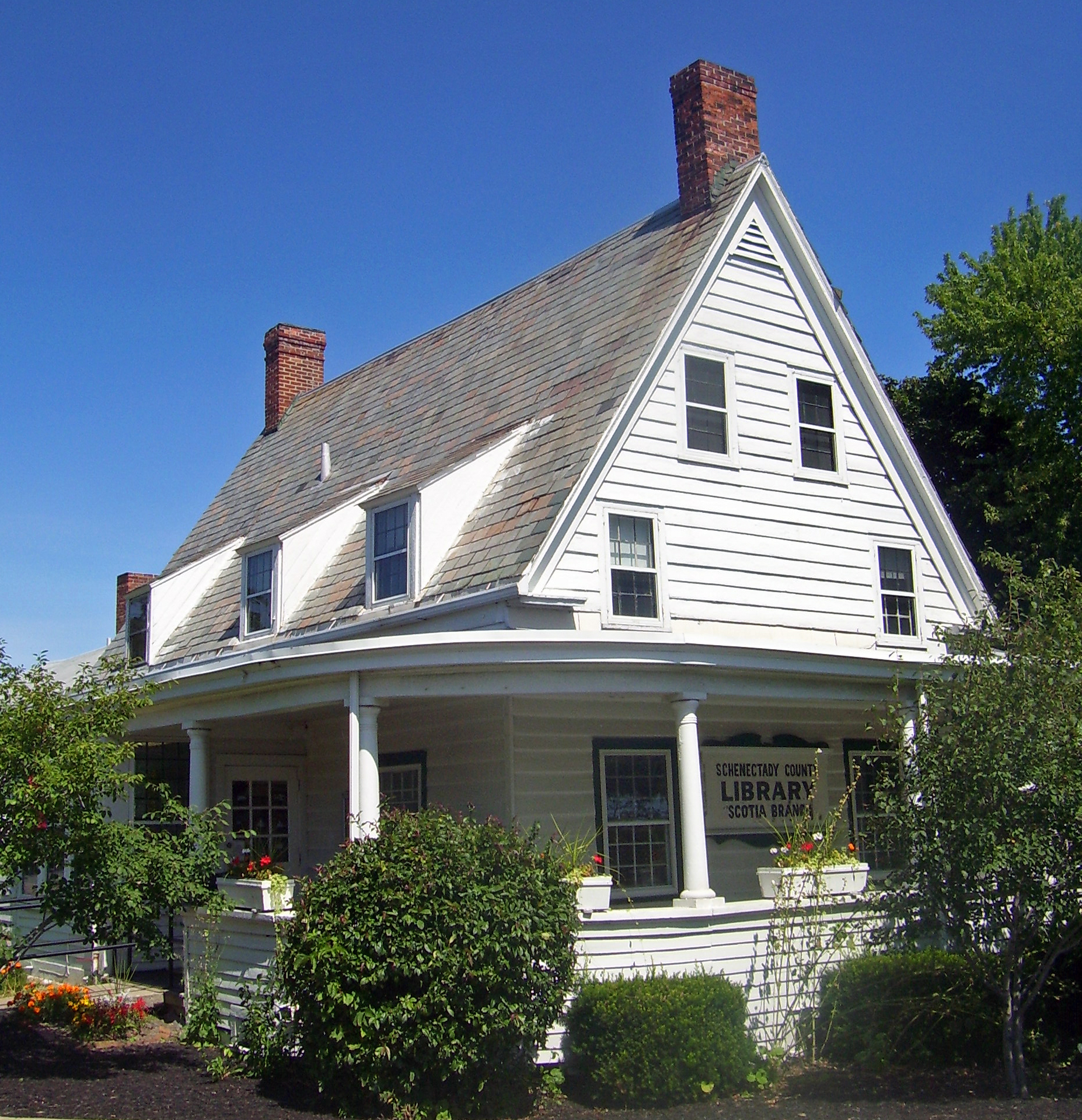
Abraham Glen House, 2008

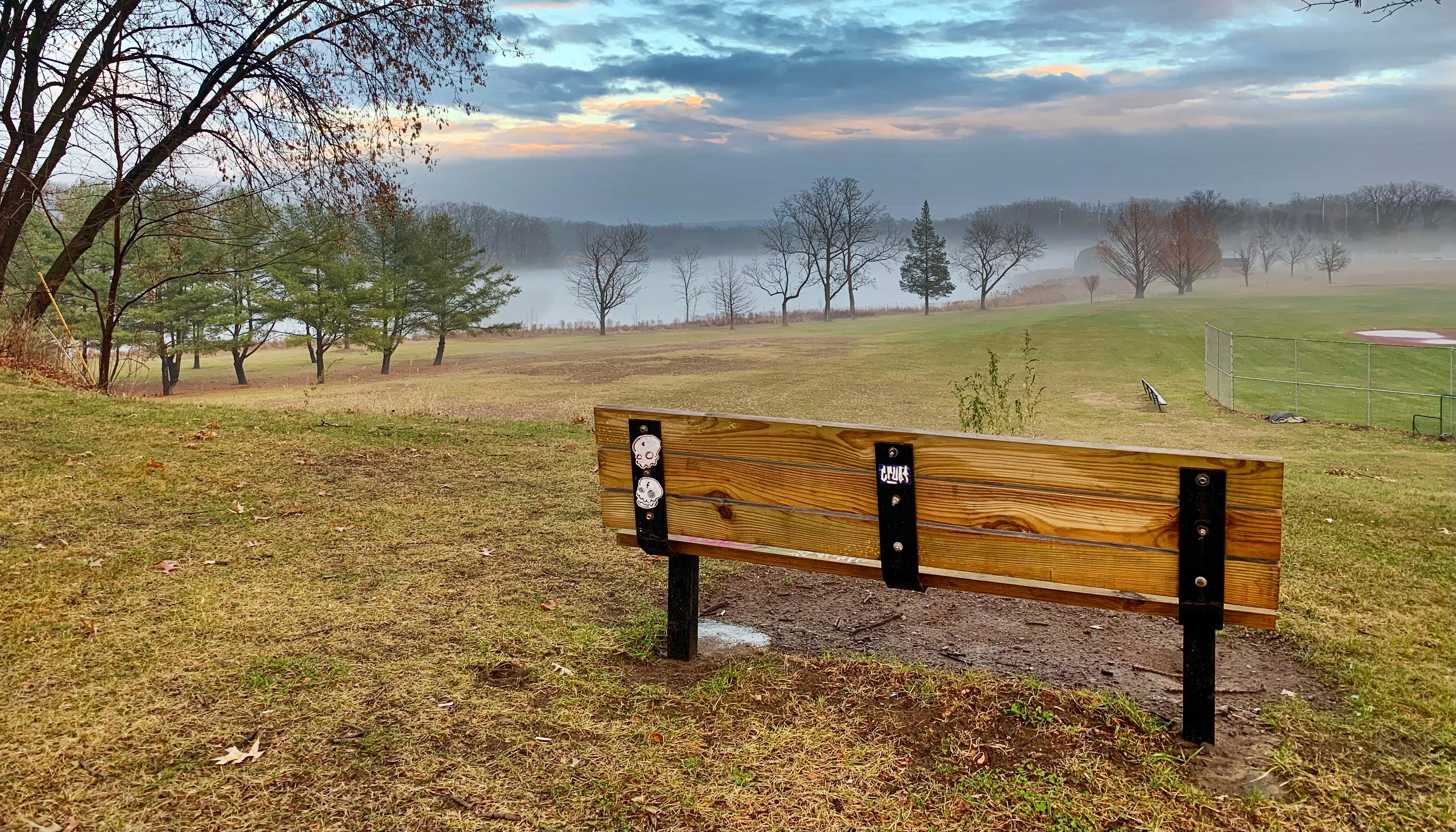
Collins Park

As of the census of 2010, there were 7,729 people, 3,362 households, and 2,006 families residing in the village. The population density was 4,573.4 inhabitants per square mile (1,765.8/km^{2}). There were 3,519 housing units at an average density of 2,082.2 per square mile (803.9/km^{2}). The racial makeup of the village was 95.4% White, 1.2% African American, 0.2% Native American, 1.1% Asian, 0.1% Pacific Islander, 0.4% from other races, and 1.8% from two or more races. Hispanic or Latino of any race were 2.8% of the population.

Of 3,362 households, 30% included individuals under the age of 18, 42.1% were married couples living together, 13.1% had a female householder with no husband present, 40.3% were non-families, 33.7% were individuals living alone, and 13.1% were individuals age 65 or older living alone. The average household size was 2.3 and the average family size was 2.95.

The village population was composed of 23.1% under the age of 18, 3.3% from 18 to 20, 31% from 21 to 44, 28.8% from 45 to 64, and 13.8% who were 65 years of age or older. The median age was 37.2 years. The female population was 51.6% and the male population was 48.4%.

In 2015, the estimated median income for a household in the village was $54,607, and the median income for a family was $75,182. Males had a median income of $54,364 versus $45,603 for females. The per capita income for the village was $26,853. An estimated 4.0% of families and 6.1% of the population were below the poverty line, including 6.9% of those under age 18 and 6.0% of those age 5.6% or over.

== Arts and culture ==
Historic buildings:

- Glen Sanders Mansion, parts dating to 1713
- Abraham Glen House, 1730s
- Flint House, early 19th century
- First Baptist Church, 1872
- Holland House (W.T. Mynderse mansion), built 1914
- Scotia Reformed Church, founded 1818, present building 1952.
- The United States Post Office, built 1940, contains a tempera mural, The Glen Family Spared by French and Indians – 1690, painted by muralist Amy Jones (artist) in 1941. in tempera and listed on the National Register of Historic Places.

== Education ==
Scotia is served by the Scotia-Glenville Central School District. Schools located in the village of Scotia include Lincoln and Sacandaga elementary schools, while Scotia-Glenville High School and Scotia-Glenville Middle School stand just outside the village limits. The private Mekeel Christian Academy occupies the former Scotia High School building in the village. Local residents may enjoy pastimes at all seasons in Collins Park and nearby Freedom Park. Winter events include sledding and ice skating, while summer activities include baseball, tennis, swimming, pond and river fishing, picnicking, concerts, and waterskiing on the Mohawk River.

== Infrastructure ==
=== Transportation ===
Scotia is served by the historic New York Route 5, and is the terminus for both Route 50 and Route 147 providing access to Saratoga County. The Route 5 link to Schenectady is over the Western Gateway Bridge, originally built in 1923-25, and replaced in 1971. From 1874 to 1925 the Mohawk River had been crossed by a bridge running from the foot of Washington Ave., Schenectady to Washington Ave., Scotia, a steel bridge built upon the seven piers of a former wooden bridge, built in 1808, called the Burr Bridge. Scotia was formerly served by railways, including the New York Central (which operated a switch yard in the village), the Delaware and Hudson, and the Boston and Maine, as well as the electric Fonda, Johnstown and Gloversville interurban line. Two nearby airports, located in the town of Glenville, serve the village: Mohawk Valley Airport is a privately owned airport for public use located three nautical miles (6 km) along State Route 5, northwest of the village of Scotia. Schenectady County Airport is a joint civil-military public airport located two nautical miles (3 km) north-northeast of the village of Scotia.

== Notable people ==
- Helmut Karl Buechner (1918–1975), ecologist, field biologist, Director of the Office of Ecology for the Smithsonian Institution, born in Scotia
- Joe Cremo (born 1996), pro basketball player, born in Scotia
- Philip Dalton (1903–1941), military scientist and pilot, born in Scotia
- Laura Diaz (born 1975), professional golfer on LPGA Tour, born in Scotia
- Robert Doherty (1885–1950), electrical engineer, president of Carnegie Mellon University, died in Scotia
- Saul Dushman (1883–1954), Russian-born physical chemist, resided, died in Scotia
- Conyers Herring (1914–2009), solid state physicist, born in Scotia
- Steve Kuczek (1924–2010), major league baseball player, died in Scotia
- Kathleen Paige (born 1948), rear admiral, U.S. Navy, program director, Aegis Ballistic Missile Defense
- James Parry (born 1967), Usenet personality known as "Kibo", born in Scotia
- David Pietrusza (born 1949) author, lived in Scotia
- George Runner (born 1952), California state senator, born in Scotia
