= Little Mountain, South Carolina =

- Town
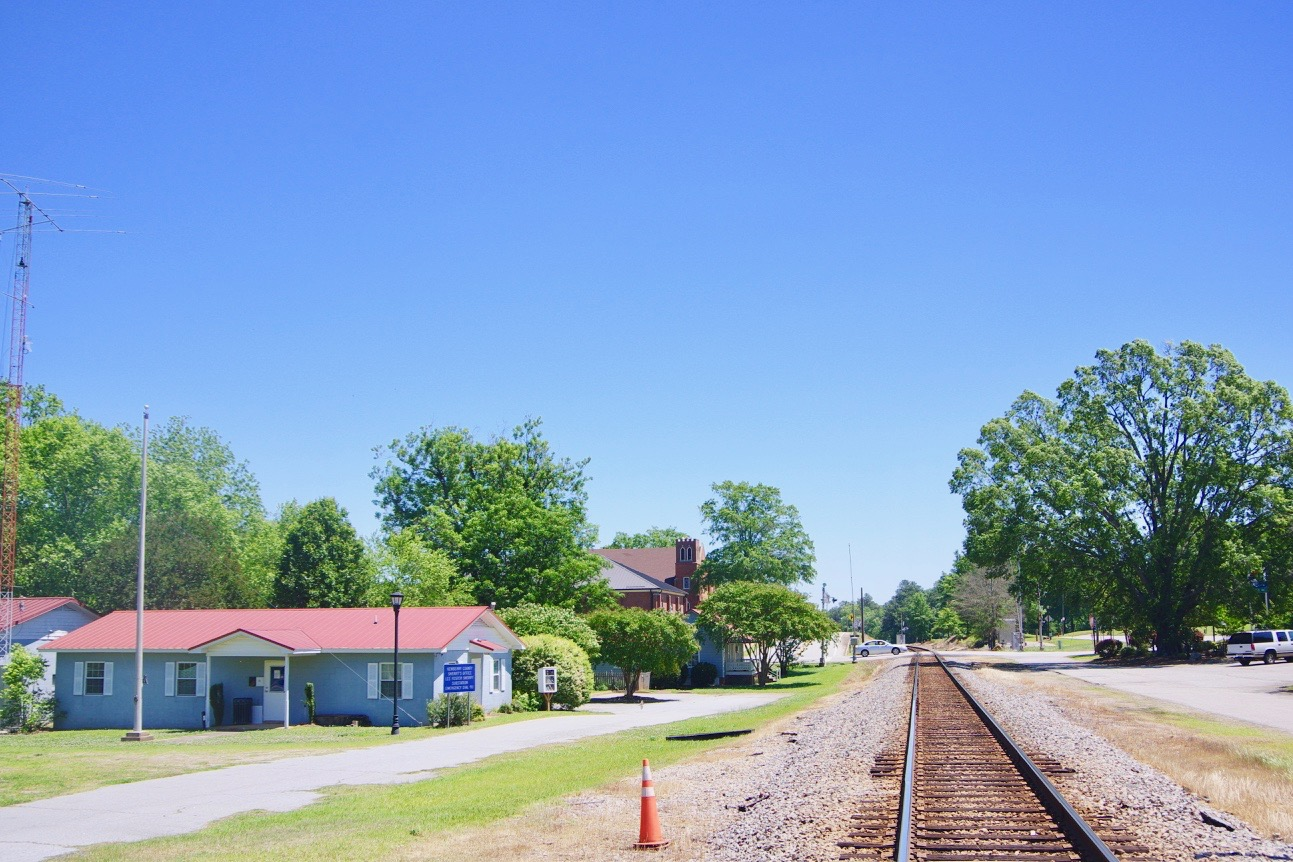
- Railroad tracks and Church Street

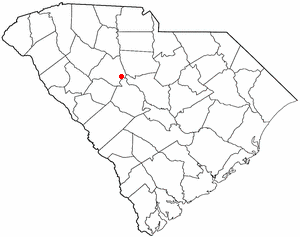
- Location of Little Mountain, South Carolina
- Coordinates: 34°11′49″N 81°24′45″W
- Country: United States
- State: South Carolina
- County: Newberry

Area
  - Total: 1.52 sq mi (3.94 km^{2})
  - Land: 1.52 sq mi (3.94 km^{2})
  - Water: 0 sq mi (0.00 km^{2})
- Elevation: 614 ft (187 m)

Population (2020)
  - Total: 249
  - Density: 163.8/sq mi (63.25/km^{2})
- Time zone: UTC-5 (Eastern (EST))
  - Summer (DST): UTC-4 (EDT)
- ZIP code: 29075
- Area codes: 803, 839
- FIPS code: 45-41965
- GNIS feature ID: 2406025
- Website: http://littlemountainsc.org

Little Mountain is a town in Newberry County, South Carolina, United States. As of the 2020 census, Little Mountain had a population of 249. The town took its name from nearby Little Mountain.

== History ==
The mountain is a monadnock, which is an isolated mountain or rock that has resisted the process of erosion and stands alone in an otherwise flat area.

The Little Mountain Historic District was listed on the National Register of Historic Places in 2003.

=== Early history ===
The mountain was referred to as Ruff's Mountain until sometime in the 1800s. It was part of Lexington County until 1917 when the current border was established. Property in this area was not recorded in the Newberry County tax records until some time in the 1920s. The Eastern side of the mountain was once owned by Sam Birge, and later Arthur Kohn. It would change hands between the two several times before coming into the possession of the Derrick family in the 1930s. The other side, including what became the town of Little Mountain, was owned by Abraham N. Boland.

=== The Town ===
Frederick H. Dominick was appointed as postmaster in May 1852. Abraham Noah Boland was appointed as postmaster of the Little Mountain Post Office in 1888. The town was founded around a railroad station in 1890: Boland's farm became the site of the depot when the C. N. & L Railroad (Columbia, Newberry, & Laurens Railroad Company) began operation. The town was incorporated and Boland became the first mayor of the town. Today, Boland is considered the "Father of Little Mountain."

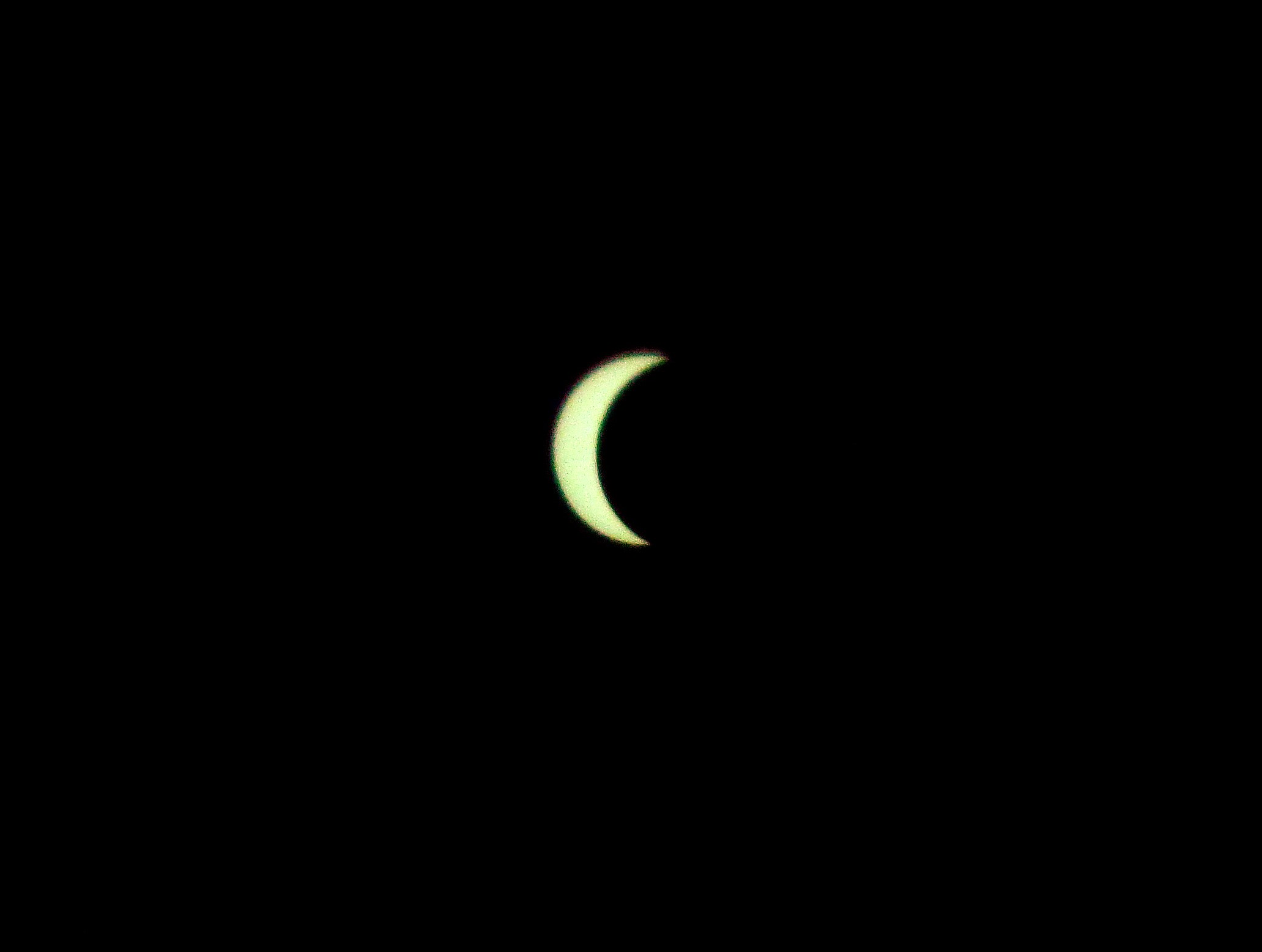
Partial Solar Eclipse seen from Little Mountain, SC on April 8, 2024

Early residents were farmers of corn, cotton and grain. The town has become a bedroom community for Columbia, the state capital, 30 miles to the southeast.

=== Education ===
In 1892, a school was opened in a tenant house and taught by the pastor of Holy Trinity Lutheran Church, Rev. S. L. Nease. Later a one-room school building was built on an acre of land donated by Noah Boland. Increased enrollment brought a two-room building and finally, in 1908 the plans were made to build the present Little Mountain Elementary School. Several additions and modifications have been made to the building since its original construction.

== Geography ==
According to the United States Census Bureau, the town has a total area of 1.1 square miles (2.7 km^{2}), all land.

Little Mountain is located on Interstate 26 at Exit 85, which is approximately 2 miles (3 km) from the heart of downtown.

=== Climate ===
Little Mountain has a humid subtropical climate (Köppen: Cfa) with long, hot summers and short, mild winters.

Climate data for Little Mountain, South Carolina (1991–2020 normals, extremes 1894–present)
Month	Jan	Feb	Mar	Apr	May	Jun	Jul	Aug	Sep	Oct	Nov	Dec	Year
Record high °F (°C)	84 (29)	82 (28)	92 (33)	97 (36)	103 (39)	107 (42)	108 (42)	107 (42)	106 (41)	103 (39)	91 (33)	81 (27)	108 (42)
Mean maximum °F (°C)	70.9 (21.6)	74.3 (23.5)	80.9 (27.2)	85.1 (29.5)	90.6 (32.6)	95.3 (35.2)	96.8 (36.0)	96.2 (35.7)	92.7 (33.7)	85.6 (29.8)	77.5 (25.3)	72.4 (22.4)	98.2 (36.8)
Mean daily maximum °F (°C)	54.7 (12.6)	58.7 (14.8)	65.9 (18.8)	74.5 (23.6)	81.7 (27.6)	87.7 (30.9)	91.0 (32.8)	89.2 (31.8)	84.1 (28.9)	74.7 (23.7)	64.3 (17.9)	57.0 (13.9)	73.6 (23.1)
Daily mean °F (°C)	45.0 (7.2)	48.3 (9.1)	54.9 (12.7)	63.4 (17.4)	71.1 (21.7)	77.7 (25.4)	80.9 (27.2)	79.5 (26.4)	74.1 (23.4)	64.0 (17.8)	53.9 (12.2)	47.4 (8.6)	63.4 (17.4)
Mean daily minimum °F (°C)	35.3 (1.8)	38.0 (3.3)	44.0 (6.7)	52.3 (11.3)	60.5 (15.8)	67.8 (19.9)	70.8 (21.6)	69.8 (21.0)	64.2 (17.9)	53.4 (11.9)	43.4 (6.3)	37.8 (3.2)	53.1 (11.7)
Mean minimum °F (°C)	16.4 (−8.7)	21.0 (−6.1)	26.0 (−3.3)	34.4 (1.3)	44.7 (7.1)	56.3 (13.5)	62.2 (16.8)	60.5 (15.8)	50.0 (10.0)	35.7 (2.1)	27.0 (−2.8)	22.1 (−5.5)	14.5 (−9.7)
Record low °F (°C)	−2 (−19)	−4 (−20)	9 (−13)	24 (−4)	33 (1)	45 (7)	53 (12)	50 (10)	39 (4)	24 (−4)	13 (−11)	2 (−17)	−4 (−20)
Average precipitation inches (mm)	4.01 (102)	3.64 (92)	4.14 (105)	3.26 (83)	3.18 (81)	4.41 (112)	4.03 (102)	4.54 (115)	3.74 (95)	3.44 (87)	3.39 (86)	4.19 (106)	45.90 (1,166)
Average snowfall inches (cm)	0.8 (2.0)	0.2 (0.51)	0.2 (0.51)	0.0 (0.0)	0.0 (0.0)	0.0 (0.0)	0.0 (0.0)	0.0 (0.0)	0.0 (0.0)	0.0 (0.0)	0.0 (0.0)	0.2 (0.51)	1.4 (3.53)
Average precipitation days (≥ 0.01 in)	9.8	9.3	9.3	8.3	7.9	9.8	9.8	10.1	7.0	6.6	7.2	9.7	104.8
Average snowy days (≥ 0.1 in)	0.3	0.2	0.1	0.0	0.0	0.0	0.0	0.0	0.0	0.0	0.0	0.1	0.7
Source: NOAA

== Demographics ==
Historical population
Census	Pop.	Note	%±
1900	283		—
1910	440		55.5%
1920	399		−9.3%
1930	244		−38.8%
1940	251		2.9%
1950	213		−15.1%
1960	238		11.7%
1970	240		0.8%
1980	282		17.5%
1990	235		−16.7%
2000	255		8.5%
2010	291		14.1%
2020	249		−14.4%
U.S. Decennial Census

According to the United States Census Bureau https://www.census.gov/popest in 2013 population in town was estimated to be 292 people and 142 households. The median household income in the town is $56,250 with 2.9% of residents living below the poverty line. This compares to the South Carolina average median household income of $44,779. The education of town residents is 93.8% with at least a high school degree compared to South Carolina's average of 84.5%.

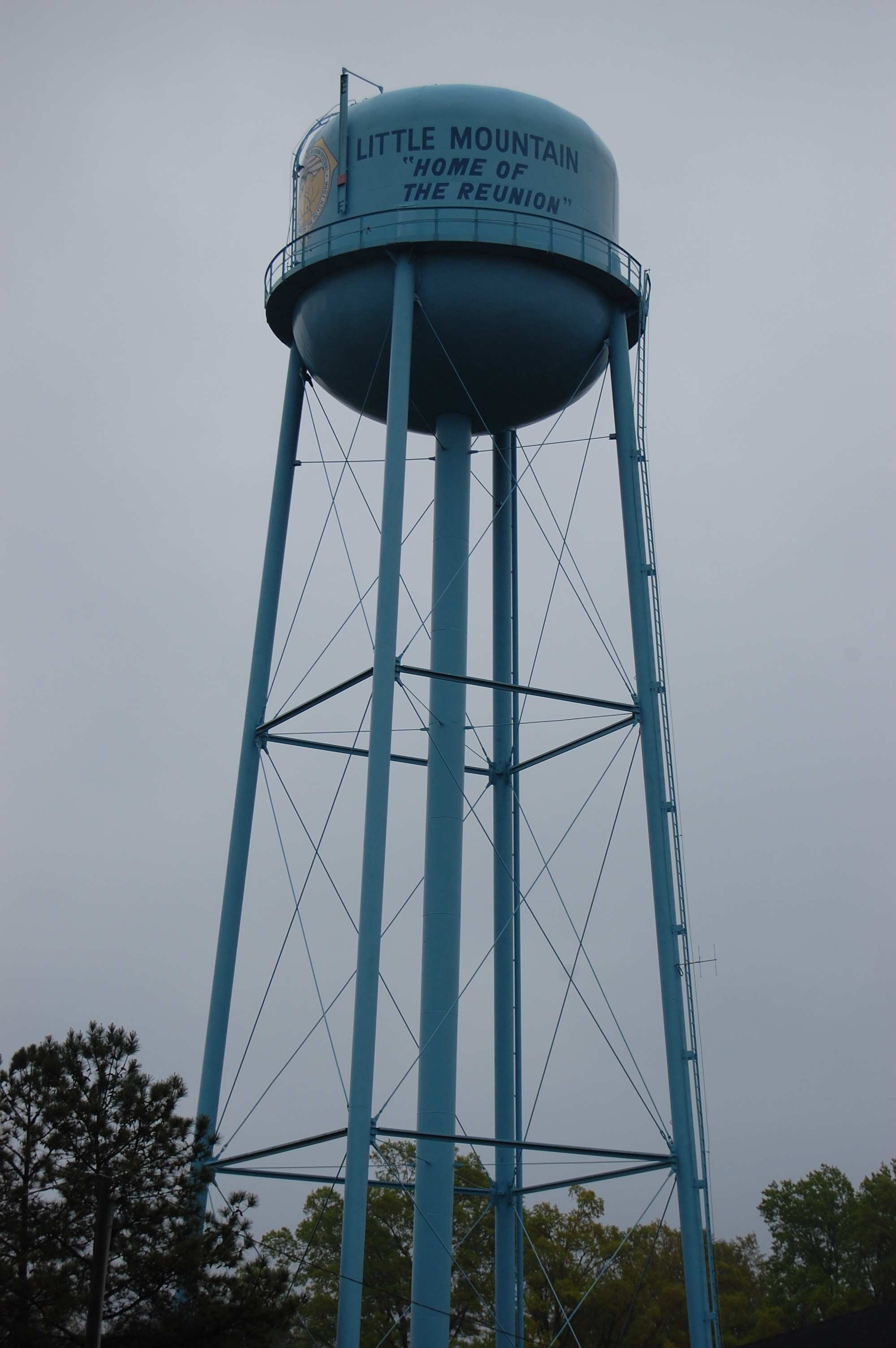
Photo of the water tower in Little Mountain, SC

== Government ==
The Town of Little Mountain has a mayor-council form of government. On March 15, 2013, Jana Jayroe was sworn in as the mayor. Jayroe has been a resident of the town for twenty years and served previously as mayor pro tem and as a member of the town council. Jana Jayroe's term as mayor of Little Mountain expires on December 31, 2024. The members of the council as of January 2021 are Marty Frick, John "Steve" White, Laura McLeod and David Bowers. Cindy Z. Farr is the town clerk.

== Little Mountain Town Reunion ==
Every year, the town of Little Mountain hosts the "Little Mountain Town Reunion" during the month of August. The Little Mountain Reunion is one of South Carolina’s oldest folk festivals. It began in 1882, as an effort by a person connected to Newberry College for encouraging local class reunions, the hope being that it would generate interest in the new college. The college experienced a number of setbacks since its organization; misused by Federal troops during the Civil War, moved to Walhalla in the upper part of South Carolina, and finally back to Newberry, the county seat of Newberry County. Because most people travelled either on two or four feet due to the lack of trains and automobiles, meeting places were selected mainly on the convenience of their location.

The Newberry Observer documents that in 1882, this group met first at Corinth Lutheran Church across the Saluda River. It was probably in the next year, or possibly the following year, that the officials decided to try the site at Little Mountain. The event was so successful that it was decided by those present that each year a Newberry College Reunion would be held at the foot of Little Mountain. The event took place on property recently purchased by A. N. Boland from Frederick Henry Dominick. He was quite agreeable to this plan and for many years prepared and sold barbecue, rice and hash, lemonade, and ice cream to those who attended. For those who wished to bring along their own picnic, tables were erected between trees. Every year, people came riding in on horseback or in buggies, wagons, carts, etc. Then in 1890, when the first train came through Little Mountain, old-timers recall how more coaches were added at reunion time to bring people from Irmo, Ballentine, White Rock, Hilton, Chapin, Clinton, Goldville, Kinards, Prosperity, Newberry and Slighs

Little Mount reunions became a traditional part of the community, situated in the heart of the Dutch Fork area. These reunions were maintained until the eve of World War II.

In 1976, the Town of Little Mountain and the Ruritan Club decided to renew the reunion as a bicentennial project. The idea generated a great deal of enthusiasm in the town. The festival was such a success that the Little Mountain Association was formed and the Little Mountain Reunion again became an annual affair.

The 2012 Reunion was cancelled, reportedly due to contract and liability issues between the Little Mountain Town Council and the Little Mountain Reunion Association.

During the August 2013 Town Council meeting, the council voted to have the Little Mountain Reunion brought back starting August 2014. Mayor Jana Jayroe led the movement to solve the problems between the town and the Little Mountain Reunion Association.
