= Glenville, New York =

- Town
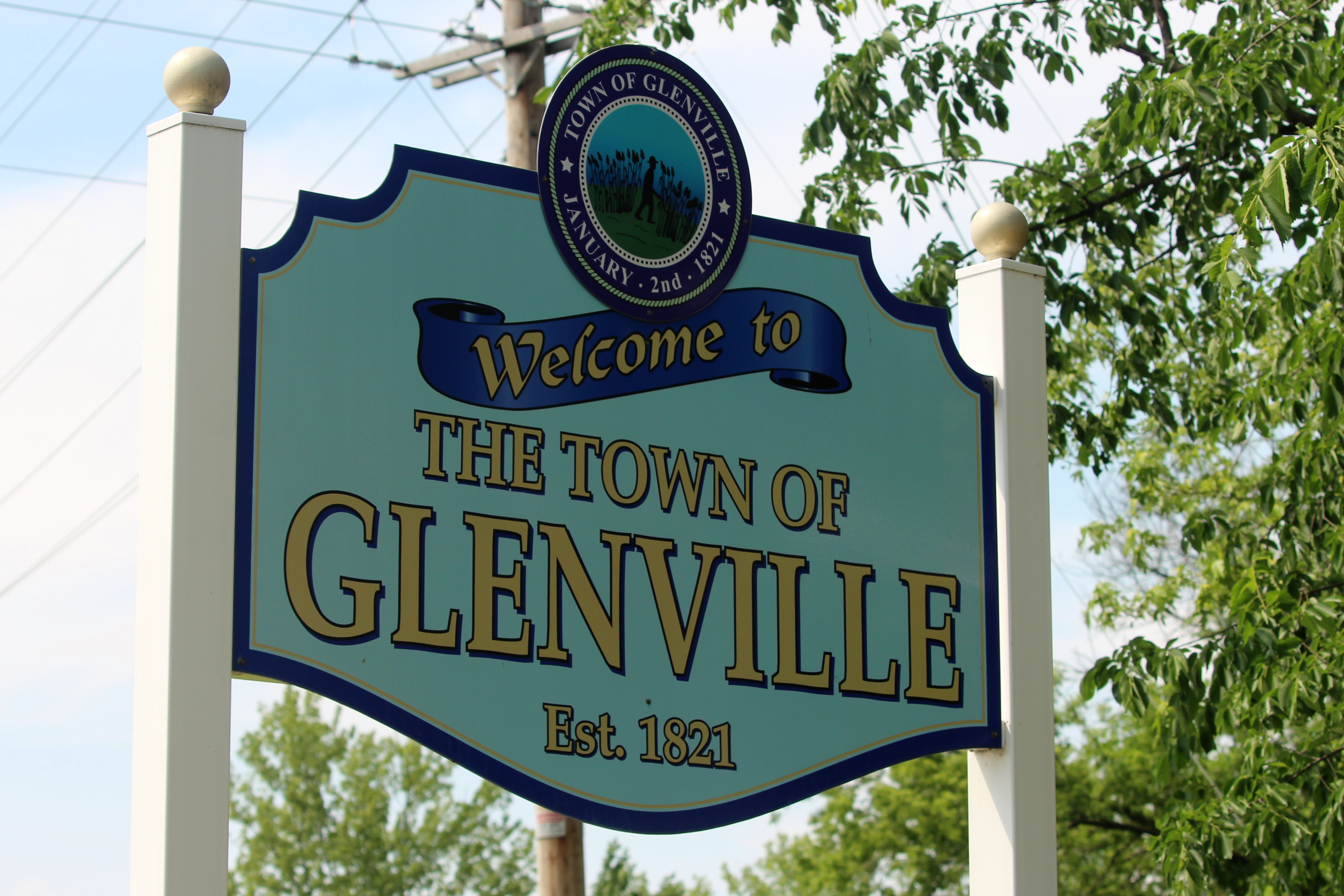
- Town of Glenville Welcome Sign

- Location in Schenectady County and the state of New York.
- Coordinates: 42°55′45″N 74°3′7″W
- Country: United States
- State: New York
- County: Schenectady
- Incorporated: 1821; 205 years ago
- Named for: Alexander Lindsay Glen

Government
  - Type: Town board
  - Town Supervisor: Bob Kirkham

Area
  - Total: 50.73 sq mi (131.40 km^{2})
  - Land: 49.24 sq mi (127.54 km^{2})
  - Water: 1.49 sq mi (3.85 km^{2})
- Elevation: 715 ft (218 m)

Population (2020)
  - Total: 29,326
  - Density: 596/sq mi (230/km^{2})
- Time zone: UTC-5 (Eastern (EST))
  - Summer (DST): UTC-4 (EDT)
- ZIP code: 12302, 12325
- Area code: 518
- FIPS code: 36-093-29366
- Website: www.townofglenville.gov

Glenville is a town in Schenectady County, New York, United States. It was incorporated in 1821 from Schenectady. As of the 2020 census, the town population was 29,326.

Including the village of Scotia, the town of Glenville encompasses the part of Schenectady County north of the Mohawk River.

== History ==
Glenville is named after Alexander Lindsay Glen. Glen, who was a native of Scotland, acquired a large tract of land in the area in the 1650s. He named his manor at Scotia after his native country (Glen Sanders Mansion).

The Seeley Farmhouse was listed on the National Register of Historic Places in 1978, the Swart House and Tavern in 2007, and the Bishop Family Lustron House was listed the following year. The Glenville District No. 5 Schoolhouse was listed in 2013.

== Geography ==
According to the United States Census Bureau, the town has a total area of 50.7 square miles (131.3 km^{2}), of which 49.2 square miles (127.4 km^{2}) is land and 1.5 square miles (3.9 km^{2}), or 2.94%, is water.

== Demographics ==
Historical population
Census	Pop.	Note	%±
1820	2,514		—
1830	2,494		−0.8%
1840	3,068		23.0%
1850	3,409		11.1%
1860	3,192		−6.4%
1870	2,973		−6.9%
1880	2,746		−7.6%
1890	2,468		−10.1%
1900	3,010		22.0%
1910	5,201		72.8%
1920	7,036		35.3%
1930	12,069		71.5%
1940	13,343		10.6%
1950	17,912		34.2%
1960	25,707		43.5%
1970	28,969		12.7%
1980	28,519		−1.6%
1990	28,771		0.9%
2000	28,183		−2.0%
2010	29,480		4.6%
2020	29,326		−0.5%
U.S. Decennial Census

At the 2000 census, 28,183 people, 11,150 households, and 7,827 families living in the town. The population density was 565.0 inhabitants per square mile (218.1/km^{2}). There were 11,582 housing units at an average density of 232.2 per square mile (89.7/km^{2}). The racial makeup of the town was 97.35% White, 0.72% African American, 0.12% Native American, 0.89% Asian, 0.02% Pacific Islander, 0.14% from other races, and 0.75% from two or more races. Hispanic or Latino of any race were 1.20% of the population.

Of the 11,150 households, 30.9% had children under 18 living with them, 59.0% were married and living together, 8.4% had a female householder with no husband, and 29.8% were non-families. 26.0% of households were one person and 12.5% were 1 person 65 or older. The average household size was 2.44 and the average family size was 2.95.

The age distribution was 23.7% under 18, 5.0% from 18 to 24, 26.3% from 25 to 44, 26.1% from 45 to 64, and 18.9% 65 or older. The median age was 42 years. For every 100 females, there were 91.9 males. For every 100 females 18 or older, there were 86.8 males.

The median household income was $52,373 and the median family income was $62,599. Males had a median income of $42,992 versus $29,228 for females. The per capita income for the town was $24,795. 4.1% of the population and 2.5% of families were below the poverty line. Out of the people living in poverty, 5.2% were under 18 and 4.2% were 65 or older.

== Communities and locations in Glenville ==
- Alplaus – A hamlet in the eastern part of the town.
- Hoffmans – A small settlement along Route 5, in the western portion of Glenville, marking the spot of the first ferry crossing of the Mohawk River in Glenville.
- East Glenville – A cluster of dense development along NY-50 in the northeastern section of town. It is a Census-designated place which extends from NY-50 eastward to Glenville's bounds with Clifton Park & Ballston.
- Scotia – The Village of Scotia lies in the south part of the town.
- Stoodley Corners – More commonly referred to as the "Town Center," marking Glenville's commercial core around the intersection of Route 50 and Glenridge Road.
- West Glenville – A small hamlet in the northwestern portion of town that dates to the early 19th century.

== Economy ==
The town of Glenville is regarded as a bedroom community, with many residents finding employment at General Electric in adjacent Schenectady, various New York state offices in nearby Albany, and numerous Capital District corporations, educational institutions, and health care industries.

== Education and recreation ==
The town is split among four public school districts; Scotia-Glenville, Burnt Hills-Ballston Lake, Amsterdam and Niskayuna. Glenville is also home to several parks and preserves.

== Transportation ==
Mohawk Valley Airport is located three nautical miles (6 km) northwest of the central business district of Scotia. Schenectady County Airport is a joint civil-military airport located two nautical miles (3 km) north-northeast of Scotia.
