= Little Mountain (British Columbia) =

Mountain in Canada

Coordinates: 49°14′30″N 123°06′48″W

Little Mountain, elevation 125 m (410 ft), is a mountain in the central part of the city of Vancouver, British Columbia, Canada. The mountain is home to Queen Elizabeth Park, which sits at the top of the mountain, and Nat Bailey Stadium, which is located near the base. The mountain lends its name to the Riley Park–Little Mountain neighbourhood and to the Vancouver-Little Mountain electoral district.

== History ==
Little Mountain is a volcanic outcropping that was formed between 31 and 34 million years ago.

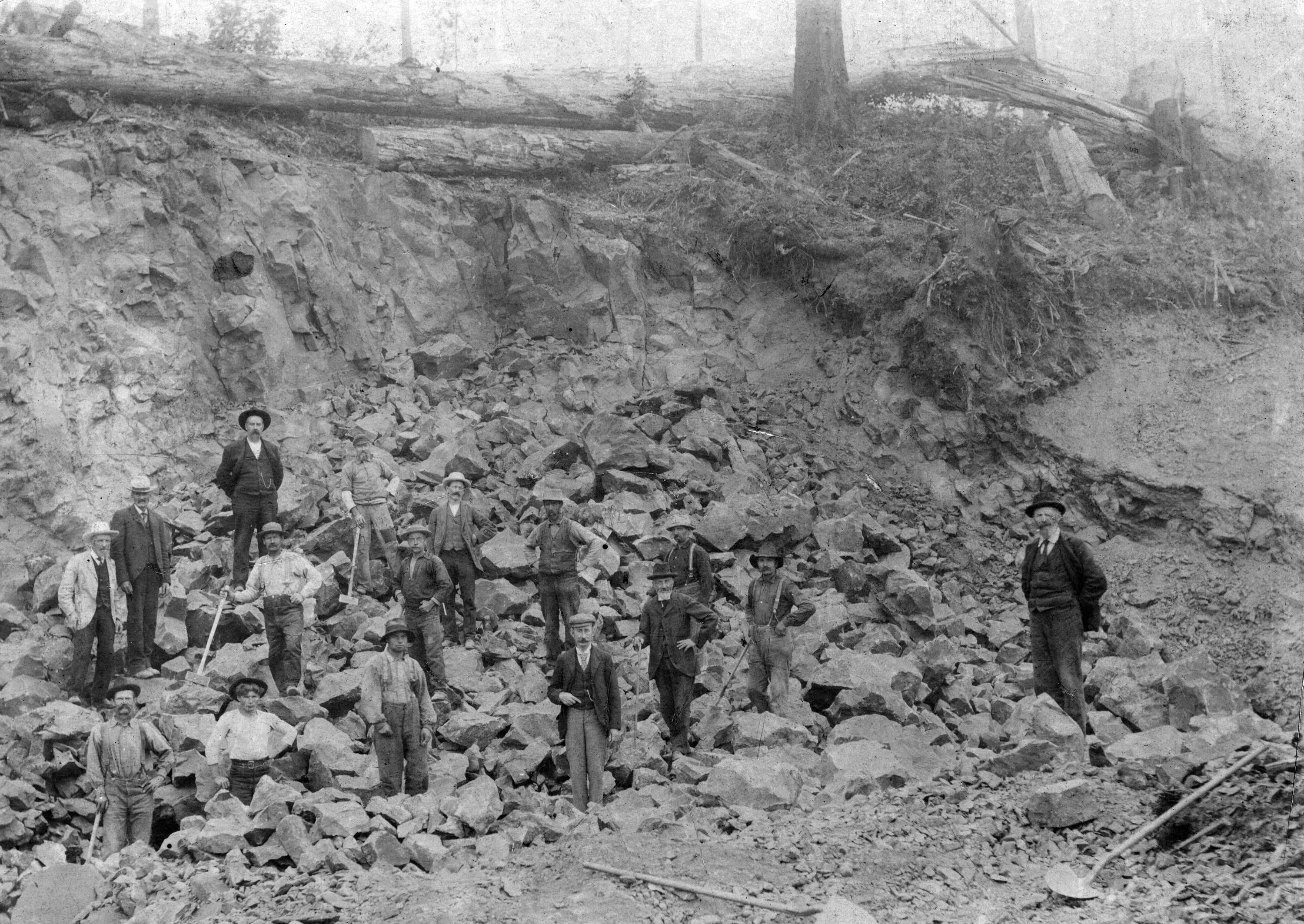
City officials inspecting Little Mountain Quarry

The land containing Little Mountain was originally owned by the Canadian Pacific Railway, which created a basalt rock quarry that operated from 1890 to 1911. The rocks from the quarry were primarily used to build roads in the Gastown, Shaughnessy and South Vancouver, British Columbia. In the 1920s, one of the quarries was converted to a water reservoir for the city. Queen Elizabeth Park was established in 1940, and the reservoir was covered over by a parking lot in 1963.

== See also ==
- Queen Elizabeth Park
