= Little League Softball World Series =

Softball tournament for girls between 10 and 12 years

- Most recent season or competition: 2026 Little League Softball World Series
- Sport: Softball
- Founded: 1974
- No. of teams: 12
- Country: International
- Most recent champions: Johnston County Little League; Clayton, North Carolina
- Most titles: Midway Little League; Waco/Hewitt, Texas (12)
- Website: LittleLeague.org

The Little League Softball World Series is an international softball tournament for girls aged 10 to 12 years old. It was first held in 1974 and has been hosted in seven different locations. Currently, the tournament is played every August at Stallings Stadium in Greenville, North Carolina in the United States.

At its inception, the tournament hosted four teams, until expanding to five teams in 1987. Little League expanded the field of World Series participants to 12 in 2022, adding two additional regions in the United States. The tournament added its first team from outside the United States in 1991, with the addition of the Canadian Region.

It was announced on February 4, 2026 that all games would be broadcast on linear ESPN platforms instead of ESPN+, comparable to the Little League World Series.

== Qualification Regionals ==
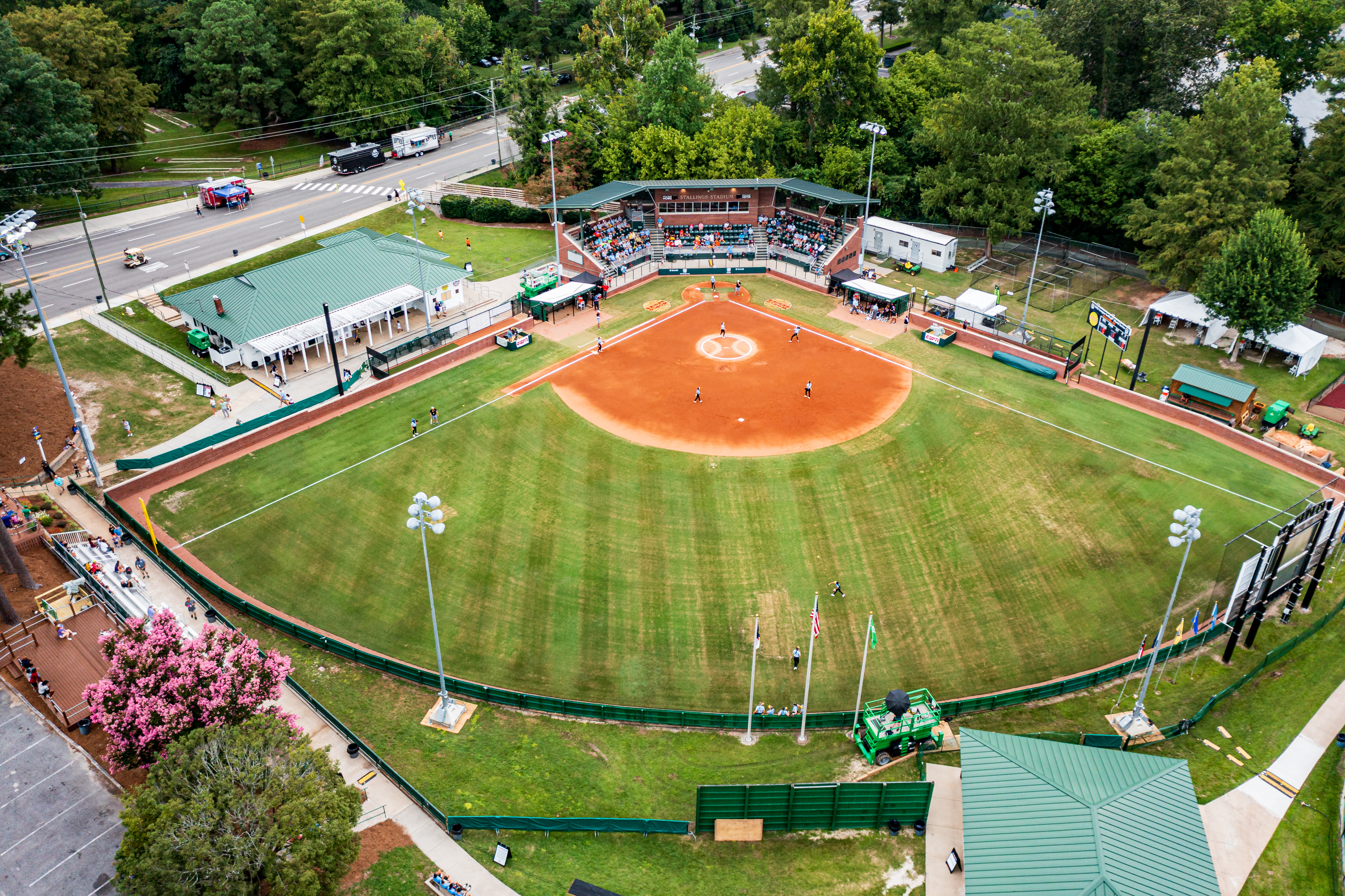
Stallings Stadium in Greenville, North Carolina during the 2021 Little League Softball World Series

The champion of each of the eight United States regional tournaments competes in the Little League Softball World Series. In 2022, the East and West regions were divided to create four new regions (Mid-Atlantic, New England, Northwest, and West):

- Central Region (Illinois, Indiana, Iowa, Kansas, Kentucky, Michigan, Minnesota, Missouri, Nebraska, North Dakota, Ohio, South Dakota, Wisconsin)
- East Region
  - Mid-Atlantic Region (Delaware, District of Columbia, Maryland, New Jersey, New York, Pennsylvania)
  - New England Region (Connecticut, Maine, Massachusetts, New Hampshire, Rhode Island, Vermont)
- Southeast Region (Alabama, Florida, Georgia, North Carolina, South Carolina, Tennessee, Virginia, West Virginia)
- Southwest Region (Arkansas, Louisiana, Mississippi, New Mexico, Oklahoma, Texas East, Texas West)
- West Region
  - Northwest Region (Alaska, Colorado, Idaho, Montana, Oregon, Washington, Wyoming)
  - West Region (Arizona, Hawaii, Nevada, Northern California, Southern California, Utah)
- Host Region (North Carolina)

The champion of each of the four international regional tournaments competes in the Little League Softball World Series:

- Asia-Pacific Region
- Canada Region
- Europe and Africa Region
- Latin America Region

== Locations ==
The tournament has been held in the following locations:

Year(s)	Location	Venue
1974	(New York (state)) Freeport, New York	Northwest Field
1975	Williamsport, Pennsylvania	Lamade Stadium
1976–1977	Portland, Oregon	Alpenrose Stadium
1978	Baxter Springs, Kansas	Baxter Springs Little League
1979	Waco, Texas	South Region Complex
1980–1993	Kalamazoo, Michigan	Vanderberg Park
1994–2019	Portland, Oregon	Alpenrose Stadium
2021–present	Greenville, North Carolina	Stallings Stadium

== Past champions ==
Year	Winners	Score	Runner up
1974	Tampa, Florida; Wellswood Little League	4–1	(Washington (state)) Kirkland, Washington; Kirkland Little League
1975	Medford, Oregon; National Little League	1–0	(New York (state)) Dix Hills, New York; Half Hollow Hills Little League
1976	Salinas, California; Salinas Little League	4–1	Sturgeon Bay, Wisconsin; Sturgeon Bay Little League
1977	Salinas, California; American Little League	4–3	Robertsdale, Alabama; Robertsdale Little League
1978	Shippensburg, Pennsylvania; Shippensburg Little League	8–3	Boone, Iowa; Boone National Little League
1979	North Providence, Rhode Island; North Providence West Little League	5–2	Orlando, Florida; Pine Castle Little League
1980	Glendale, California; Glendale Little League	9–4	Seymour, Connecticut; George J. Hummel Little League
1981	Gresham, Oregon; Gresham Little League	8–3	Tallmadge, Ohio; Tallmadge Little League
1982	Glendale, California; 76er Little League	2–1	(New York (state)) Staten Island, New York; Mid Island Little League
1983	Naples, Florida; Greater Naples Little League	5–2	(Washington (state)) Vancouver, Washington; Alcoa Little League
1984	Albuquerque, New Mexico; Albuquerque Little League	11–3	Indianapolis, Indiana; Fall Creek Little League
1985	Brookfield, Illinois; National Little League	1–0	Hawthorne, California; Holly Park Little League
1986	Tampa, Florida; Tampa Bay Little League	1–0	Tucson, Arizona; Tucson Mountain Little League
1987	Tampa, Florida; Tampa Bay Little League	7–0	Tallmadge, Ohio; Tallmadge Little League
1988	Naples, Florida; Greater Naples Little League	1–0	Glendale, California; Foothill Little League
1989	Naples, Florida; Greater Naples Little League	5–0	(Washington (state)) Marysville, Washington; Marysville Little League
1990	Glendale, California; Foothill Little League	2–0	Tallmadge, Ohio; Tallmadge Little League
1991	Naples, Florida; Greater Naples Little League	2–0	Glasgow, Delaware; Canal Little League
1992	Waco, Texas; Midway Little League	6–2	Gresham, Oregon; Centennial Little League
1993	Waco, Texas; Midway Little League	10–1	(Washington (state)) Marysville, Washington; Marysville Little League
1994	Waco, Texas; Midway Little League	8–4	Gresham, Oregon; Centennial Little League
1995	Waco, Texas; Midway Little League	3–2	Lancaster, California; Parkview Little League
1996	Clearwater, Florida; Countryside Little League	4–0	Pampanga, Philippines; Pampanga Little League
1997	Waco, Texas; Midway Little League	6–0	Warrington, Pennsylvania; Warrington Warwick Little League
1998	Waco, Texas; Midway Little League	2–0	Beaverton, Oregon; Murrayhill Little League
1999	Waco, Texas; Midway Little League	6–1	Stockton, California; Oakpark Little League
2000	Waco, Texas; Midway Little League	6–1	Tualatin, Oregon; Tualatin Little League
2001	Maunabo, Puerto Rico; Rosario Y Cardona Little League	4–3	Waco, Texas; Midway Little League
2002	Waco, Texas; Midway Little League	6–1	Beaverton, Oregon; Beaverton Area Little League
2003	Waco, Texas; Midway Little League	16–10	Naples, Florida; Naples Girls Softball Little League
2004	Waco, Texas; Midway Little League	18–5	McLean, Virginia; McLean Little League
2005	McLean, Virginia; McLean Little League	6–2	Orange, Connecticut; Orange Little League
2006	Mattawan, Michigan; Mattawan Little League	6–2	Pequannock, New Jersey; Pequannock Little League
2007	Morristown, Tennessee; Morristown American/National Little League	3–2	Elgin, Texas; Elgin Little League
2008	Simpsonville, South Carolina; Simposnville Little League	9–5	Robbinsville, New Jersey; Robbinsville Little League
2009	(Georgia (U.S. state)) Warner Robins, Georgia; Warner Robins American Little League	14–2	Crawford, Texas; Crawford Little League
2010	(Georgia (U.S. state)) Warner Robins, Georgia; Warner Robins American Little League	8–6	Burbank, California; Burbank Little League
2011	Sterling, Illinois; Sterling Little League	7–5	Waco, Texas; Midway Little League
2012	Albuquerque, New Mexico; Eastdale Little League	16–1	Windermere, Florida; Windermere Little League
2013	Tucson, Arizona; Sunnyside Little League	9–0	McLean, Virginia; McLean Little League
2014	Robbinsville, New Jersey; Robbinsville Little League	4–1	Bossier City, Louisiana; Bossier Little League
2015	Salisbury, North Carolina; Rowan Little League	4–2	Warwick, Rhode Island; Warwick Little League
2016	Helotes, Texas; Greater Helotes Little League	5–1	Salisbury, North Carolina; Rowan Little League
2017	Waco, Texas; Lake Air Little League	7–2	Salisbury, North Carolina; Rowan Little League
2018	Wheelersburg, Ohio; Wheelersburg Little League	3–0	Tunkhannock, Pennsylvania; Tunkhannock Little League
2019	Salisbury, North Carolina; Rowan Little League	4–1	River Ridge, Louisiana; Eastbank Little League
2020	Cancelled due to COVID-19 pandemic		
2021	Muskogee, Oklahoma; Green Country Little League	9–1	Chesterfield, Virginia; Chesterfield Little League
2022	Hewitt, Texas; Midway Little League	5–4	Delmar, Maryland; Delmar Little League
2023	(New York (state)) Massapequa, New York; Massapequa International Little League	5–2	Winterville, North Carolina; Pitt County Girls Softball Little League
2024	Winterville, North Carolina; Pitt County Girls Softball Little League	1–0	Sterlington, Louisiana; Sterlington Little League
2025	Johnstown, Pennsylvania; West Suburban Little League	1–0	Floyds Knobs, Indiana; Floyds Knobs Community Club Little League
2026	Clayton, North Carolina; Johnston County Little League	2–0	Owensboro, Kentucky; Daviess County Little League

== Championship totals ==
=== Championships won by country/state ===
Rank	Team	Championships	Years
1	Texas	14	1992, 1993, 1994, 1995, 1997, 1998, 1999, 2000, 2002, 2003, 2004, 2016, 2017, 2022
2	Florida	8	1974, 1983, 1986, 1987, 1988, 1989, 1991, 1996
3	California	5	1976, 1977, 1980, 1982, 1990
4	North Carolina	4	2015, 2019, 2024, 2026
5	(Georgia (U.S. state)) Georgia	2	2009, 2010
5	Illinois	2	1985, 2011
5	New Mexico	2	1984, 2012
5	Oregon	2	1975, 1981
5	Pennsylvania	2	1978, 2025
10	Arizona	1	2013
10	Michigan	1	2006
10	New Jersey	1	2014
10	(New York (state)) New York	1	2023
10	Ohio	1	2018
10	Oklahoma	1	2021
10	Puerto Rico	1	2001
10	Rhode Island	1	1979
10	South Carolina	1	2008
10	Tennessee	1	2007
10	Virginia	1	2005

== See also ==
- Junior League World Series (softball)
- List of Little League Softball World Series champions by division
- List of Little League Softball World Series participants
