= 2015 World Series (disambiguation) =

2015 World Series is the 2015 championship series of Major League Baseball.

It may also refer to:

Baseball and softball

- 2015 College World Series
- 2015 Little League Softball World Series
- 2015 Little League World Series

Other

- 2015 PSA World Series
- 2015 World Series of Poker
- 2015 World Series by Renault season
- 2015 WSA World Series
- 2015–16 America's Cup World Series
