= 2001 Little League Softball World Series qualification =

United States
- Central Winner: Wheelersburg, Ohio
- East Winner: Greensburg, Pennsylvania
- South Winner: Waco, Texas
- West Winner: (Washington (state)) Kirkland, Washington

International
- Far East Winner: Bacolod, Philippines
- Canada Winner: Windsor, Ontario
- Europe Winner: The Hague, Netherlands
- Latin America Winner: Maunabo, Puerto Rico

Tournaments

All the qualified teams qualify for the 2001 Little League Softball World Series in Portland, Oregon.

== United States ==
=== Central ===
The tournament took place in Joplin, Missouri from August 1–6.

Central Pool
State	City	Little League	Record
South Dakota	Rapid City	Canyon Lake LL	4–1
Michigan	Jenison	Georgetown LL	3–2
Iowa	Beaverdale	Beaverdale LL	3–2
Indiana	Pendleton	Pendleton LL	3–2
Kentucky	London	South London LL	2–3
Missouri District II	Joplin	Joplin LL	0–5

American Pool
State	City	Little League	Record
Ohio	Wheelersburg	Wheelersburg LL	4–0
Wisconsin	Appleton	Appleton LL	3–1
Missouri	Concordia	LaCoMo LL	1–3
Nebraska	Ft. Calhoun	Florence-Calhoun LL	1–3
Illinois	Chicago Ridge	Chicago Ridge LL	1–3

Semifinals
CEN1	South Dakota	12
AME2	Wisconsin	13
AME1	Ohio	6
CEN2	Michigan	3

Finals
AME2	Wisconsin	3
AME1	Ohio	6

=== East ===
The tournament took place in Georgetown, Delaware from August 1–6.

Mid Atlantic Pool
State	City	Little League	Record
Connecticut			5–0
Massachusetts			4–1
Maine			2–3
Maryland			1–4
Delaware			0–5
New Hampshire			0–5

New England Pool
State	City	Little League	Record
Pennsylvania	Greensburg	West Point LL	5–0
New Jersey			3–2
(New York (state)) New York			3–2
Delaware D3			3–2
Vermont			2–3
Rhode Island			2–3

East Regional Finals
MA1	Connecticut	3
NE1	Pennsylvania	4

=== South ===
The tournament took place in Toccoa, Georgia from August 3–7.

Teams
Division	State	City	Little League
Division 1	Texas	Waco	Midway LL
Division 2	Louisiana	Ville Platte	Ville Platte LL
Division 3	Florida	Tampa	Tampa Bay LL
Division 4	Virginia	McLean	McLean LL

First Round
D3	Florida	4
D2	Louisiana	0
D1	Texas	13
D4	Virginia	4
Lower round 1
0–1	Louisiana	2
0–1	Virginia	6

Semifinals
1–0	Florida	3
1–0	Texas	5
Lower final
1–1	Virginia	0
1–1	Florida	12

Championship
2–0	Texas
2–1	Florida

=== West ===
The tournament took place in Sunnyvale, California from August 5–8.

Teams
Division	State	City	Little League
Division 1	Northern California	Gilroy	Gilroy LL
Division 2	(Washington (state)) Washington	Kirkland	Kirkland LL
Division 3	Southern California	Manhattan Beach	Manhattan Beach LL
Division 4	Nevada	Las Vegas	Legacy LL

First Round
D1	N. California	13
D4	Nevada	1
D2	(Washington (state)) Washington	3
D3	S. California	1
Lower round 1
0–1	Nevada	16
0–1	S. California	15

Semifinals
1–0	N. California	6
1–0	(Washington (state)) Washington	4
Lower final
1–1	Nevada	2
1–1	(Washington (state)) Washington	12

Championship
2–0	N. California
2–1	(Washington (state)) Washington
