= 1985 Little League Softball World Series =

Tournament details
- Dates: August 13–August 17
- Teams: 4

Final positions
- Champions: Brookfield, Illinois; National Little League
- Runners-up: Hawthorne, California; Holly Park Little League

The 1985 Little League Softball World Series was held in Kalamazoo, Michigan from August 13 to August 17, 1985. Four teams, all from the United States, competed for the Little League Softball World Series Championship in a double-elimination tournament.

== Teams ==
Each team that competed in the tournament came out of one of four qualifying regions.

United States Regions
Central Region
Brookfield, Illinois
National Little League
East Region
Glasgow, Delaware
Canal Little League
South Region
King, North Carolina
King Little League
West Region
Hawthorne, California
Holly Park Little League

== Results ==
Upper round 1
-	California	4
–	North Carolina	2
–	Delaware	0
–	Illinois	5
Lower round 1
0–1	North Carolina	3
0–1	Delaware	2

Upper final
1–0	Illinois	4
1–0	California	3
Lower final
1–1	California	4
1–1	North Carolina	2

Championship
2–0	Illinois	1	–
2–1	California	0	–

1985 Little League Softball World Series Champions
National Little League
Brookfield, Illinois
