= 1982 Little League Softball World Series =

Tournament details
- Dates: August 17–August 21
- Teams: 4

Final positions
- Champions: Glendale, California; 76er Little League
- Runners-up: (New York (state)) Staten Island, New York; Mid Island Little League

The 1982 Little League Softball World Series was held in Kalamazoo, Michigan from August 17 to August 21, 1982. Four teams, all from the United States, competed for the Little League Softball World Series Championship in a double-elimination tournament.

== Teams ==
Each team that competed in the tournament came out of one of four qualifying regions.

United States Regions
Central Region
Brookfield, Illinois
National Little League
East Region
(New York (state)) Staten Island, New York
Mid Island Little League
South Region
Salem, Virginia
Salem Little League
West Region
Glendale, California
76er Little League

== Results ==
Upper round 1
-	Illinois	5
–	California	1
–	Virginia	5
–	(New York (state)) New York	8
Lower round 1
0–1	California	14
0–1	Virginia	7

Upper final
1–0	(New York (state)) New York	2
1–0	Illinois	0
Lower final
1–1	Illinois	0
1–1	California	2

Championship
2–0	(New York (state)) New York	0	1
2–1	California	1	2

1982 Little League Softball World Series Champions
76er Little League
Glendale, California
