= 1990 Little League Softball World Series =

Tournament details
- Dates: August 14–August 18
- Teams: 4

Final positions
- Champions: Glendale, California; Foothill Little League
- Runners-up: Tallmadge, Ohio; Tallmadge Little League

The 1990 Little League Softball World Series was held in Kalamazoo, Michigan from August 14 to August 18, 1990. Four teams, all from the United States, competed for the Little League Softball World Series Championship in a double-elimination tournament.

== Teams ==
Each team that competed in the tournament came out of one of four qualifying regions.

United States Regions
Central Region
Tallmadge, Ohio
Tallmadge Little League
East Region
Chambersburg, Pennsylvania
Guilford Little League
South Region
Naples, Florida
Greater Naples Little League
West Region
Glendale, California
Foothill Little League

== Results ==
Upper round 1
-	Florida	1
–	California	2
–	Ohio	12
–	Pennsylvania	1
Lower round 1
0–1	Florida	8
0–1	Pennsylvania	0

Upper final
1–0	Ohio	4
1–0	California	6
Lower final
1–1	Ohio	4
1–1	Florida	3

Championship
2–0	California	2	–
2–1	Ohio	0	–

1990 Little League Softball World Series Champions
Foothill Little League
Glendale, California
