= 2006 Little League Softball World Series =

Tournament details
- Dates: August 10–August 16
- Teams: 10

Final positions
- Champions: Mattawan, Michigan; Mattawan Little League
- Runners-up: Pequannock, New Jersey; Pequannock Little League

The 2006 Little League Softball World Series was held in Portland, Oregon from August 10 to August 16, 2006. Ten teams, four international teams and six from the United States, competed for the Little League Softball World Series Championship.

== Teams ==
Each team that competed in the tournament came out of one of ten qualifying regions.

Pool A	Pool B
Canada Region; Victoria, British Columbia; Layritz Little League	Asia-Pacific Region; Makati City, Philippines; ILLAM Central Little League
East Region; Pequannock, New Jersey; Pequannock Little League	Central Region; Mattawan, Michigan; Mattawan Little League
Host District (Oregon District 4); Portland, Oregon; Cedar Mill Little League	Europe-Middle East-Africa Region; Ramstein AFB, Germany; KMC American Little League
Latin America Region; Willemstad, Curaçao; Soraida Juliana Little League	South Region; Morristown, Tennessee; Morristown American/National Little League
Southwest Region; Elgin, Texas; Elgin Little League	West Region; Gilroy, California; Gilroy Little League

== Results ==
Pool A
Rank	Region	Record
1	New Jersey	4–0
2	Texas	3–1
3	Oregon	2–2
4	Curaçao	1–3
5	Canada	0–4

Pool B
Rank	Region	Record
1	Michigan	4–0
2	Tennessee	3–1
3	California	2–2
4	Philippines	1–3
5	Germany	0–4

Pool	Away	Score	Home	Score
August 10
A	New Jersey	10	Curaçao	4
B	California	0	Tennessee	9
B	Germany	4	Philippines	10
A	Texas	9	Oregon	1
August 11
B	Michigan	11	Germany	0
B	California	16	Philippines	5
A	New Jersey	10	Canada	0
A	Oregon	9	Curaçao	0
August 12
A	Texas	7	New Jersey	13
B	California	14	Germany	0
A	Canada	3	Curaçao	6
B	Michigan	4	Tennessee	0
August 13
A	Canada	0	Texas	10
B	Germany	2	Tennessee	20
A	Oregon	4	New Jersey	7
B	Michigan	3	Philippines	0
August 14
B	Tennessee	6	Philippines	5
A	Texas	10	Curaçao	0
A	Oregon	9	Canada	7
B	Michigan	1	California	0
August 15
9th Place	Canada	10	Germany	0
7th Place	Curaçao	5	Philippines	4
5th Place	Oregon	0	California	1

=== Elimination round ===
Semifinals
A1	New Jersey	5
B2	Tennessee	1
B1	Michigan	2
A2	Texas	0

Finals
A1	New Jersey	2
B1	Michigan	6
Third place
B2	Tennessee	4
A2	Texas	5

2006 Little League Softball World Series Champions
Mattawan Little League
Mattawan, Michigan
