= 1995 Little League Softball World Series =

Tournament details
- Dates: August 13–August 20
- Teams: 8

Final positions
- Champions: Waco, Texas; Midway Little League
- Runners-up: Lancaster, California; Parkview Little League

The 1995 Little League Softball World Series was held in Portland, Oregon from August 13 to August 20, 1995. Eight teams, three international teams and five from the United States, competed for the Little League Softball World Series Championship in a round-robin tournament, with the top two teams from each pool advancing to the semifinals.

== Teams ==
Each team that competed in the tournament came out of one of eight qualifying regions.

Pool A	Pool B
Canada Region; Windsor, Ontario; Windsor South Canadian Little League	East Region; Greensburg, Pennsylvania; West Point Little League
Central Region; Escanaba, Michigan; Escanaba Little League	Europe Region; Stuttgart, Germany; EURCOM Community Little League
Far East Region; Pampanga, Philippines; Pampanga Little League	Host Region (Portland Metro); Tualatin, Oregon; Tulatin Little League
South Region; Waco, Texas; Midway Little League	West Region; Lancaster, California; Parkview Little League

== Results ==
Pool A
Rank	Region	Record
1	Texas	3–0
2	Canada	1–2
4	Philippines	1–2
3	Michigan	1–2

Pool B
Rank	Region	Record
1	California	3–0
2	Pennsylvania	2–1
3	Oregon	1–2
4	Germany	0–3

Team	Score	Team	Score
Pool A
Texas	11	Michigan	0
Philippines	6	Canada	2
Michigan	5	Canada	7
Texas	18	Philippines	0
Michigan	6	Philippines	8
Texas	3	Canada	1
Pool B
California	13	Oregon	0
Germany	3	Pennsylvania	13
Oregon	2	Pennsylvania	11
Germany	0	California	27
California	12	Pennsylvania	0
Germany	2	Oregon	18

=== Semifinals and finals ===
Semifinals
A1	Texas	6
B2	Pennsylvania	1
B1	California	21
A2	Canada	1

Finals
A1	Texas	3
B1	California	2

1995 Little League Softball World Series Champions
Midway Little League
Waco, Texas
