= 2005 Little League Softball World Series =

Tournament details
- Dates: August 11–August 18
- Teams: 10

Final positions
- Champions: McLean, Virginia; McLean Little League
- Runners-up: Orange, Connecticut; Orange Little League

The 2005 Little League Softball World Series was held in Portland, Oregon from August 11 to August 18, 2005. Ten teams, four international teams and six from the United States, competed for the Little League Softball World Series Championship.

== Teams ==
Each team that competed in the tournament came out of one of ten qualifying regions.

Pool A	Pool B
Canada Region; Victoria, British Columbia; Beacon Hill Little League	Asia-Pacific Region; Bacolod, Philippines; Bacolod Central Little League
East Region; Orange, Connecticut; Orange Little League	Central Region; Louisville, Kentucky; Valley Sports Little League
Host District (Oregon District 4); Portland, Oregon; Cedar Mill Little League	Europe-Middle East-Africa Region; Brzeg, Poland; Brzeg Little League
Latin America Region; Willemstad, Curaçao; Soraida Juliana Little League	South Region; McLean, Virginia; McLean Little League
Southwest Region; New Iberia, Louisiana; Evangeline Little League	West Region; Gilroy, California; Gilroy Little League

== Results ==
Pool A
Rank	Region	Record
1	Connecticut	4–0
2	Louisiana	2–2
3	Curaçao	2–2
4	Oregon	2–2
5	Canada	0–4

Pool B
Rank	Region	Record
1	Virginia	3–1
2	Philippines	3–1
3	California	2–2
4	Kentucky	2–2
5	Poland	0–4

Pool	Away	Score	Home	Score
August 11
A	Connecticut	4	Curaçao	0
B	California	11	Virginia	12
B	Poland	0	Philippines	7
A	Louisiana	3	Oregon	7
August 12
B	Kentucky	16	Poland	8
A	Connecticut	4	Canada	1
B	California	1	Philippines	2
A	Oregon	6	Curaçao	7
August 13
A	Louisiana	2	Connecticut	3
A	Canada	1	Curaçao	11
B	California	8	Poland	1
B	Kentucky	5	Virginia	3
August 14
A	Canada	0	Louisiana	2
B	Poland	0	Virginia	4
A	Oregon	1	Connecticut	2
B	Kentucky	1	Philippines	6
August 15
B	Virginia	4	Philippines	1
A	Louisiana	2	Curaçao	0
B	Kentucky	5	California	8
A	Oregon	12	Canada	0
August 17
9th Place	Canada	3	Poland	1
7th Place	Oregon	4	Kentucky	9
5th Place	Curaçao	3	California	1

=== Elimination round ===
Semifinals
A1	Connecticut	1
B2	Philippines	0
B1	Virginia	4
A2	Louisiana	0

Finals
A1	Connecticut	2
B1	Virginia	6
Third place
B2	Philippines	4
A2	Louisiana	3

2005 Little League Softball World Series Champions
McLean Little League
McLean, Virginia
