= 1992 Little League Softball World Series =

Tournament details
- Dates: August 17–August 22
- Teams: 5

Final positions
- Champions: Waco, Texas; Midway Little League
- Runners-up: Gresham, Oregon; Centennial Little League

The 1992 Little League Softball World Series was held in Kalamazoo, Michigan from August 17 to August 22, 1992. Five teams, one international team and four from the United States, competed for the Little League Softball World Series Championship in a double-elimination tournament.

== Teams ==
Each team that competed in the tournament came out of one of five qualifying regions.

United States Regions	International Regions
Central Region; Tallmadge, Ohio; Tallmadge Little League	Canada Region; Duncan, British Columbia; Duncan Little League
East Region; Glasgow, Delaware; Canal Little League	
South Region; Waco, Texas; Midway Little League	
West Region; Gresham, Oregon; Centennial Little League	

== Results ==
Upper round 1
—	Texas	12
—	Delaware	0
Lower round 1
0–1	Ohio	4
0–1	Delaware	5

Upper round 2
–	Canada	2
1–0	Texas	18
—	Oregon	4
—	Ohio	2
Lower round 2
0–1	Canada	0
1–1	Delaware	12

Upper final
2–0	Texas	14
1–0	Oregon	5
Lower final
1–1	Oregon	2
2–1	Delaware	1

Championship
3–0	Texas	1	6
2–1	Oregon	4	2

1992 Little League Softball World Series Champions
Midway Little League
Waco, Texas
