= 1986 Little League Softball World Series =

Tournament details
- Dates: August 12–August 16
- Teams: 4

Final positions
- Champions: Tampa, Florida; Tampa Bay Little League
- Runners-up: Tucson, Arizona; Tucson Mountain Little League

The 1986 Little League Softball World Series was held in Kalamazoo, Michigan from August 12 to August 16, 1986. Four teams, all from the United States, competed for the Little League Softball World Series Championship in a double-elimination tournament.

== Teams ==
Each team that competed in the tournament came out of one of four qualifying regions.

United States Regions
Central Region
Southport, Indiana
Southport Little League
East Region
Chambersburg, Pennsylvania
Guilford Little League
South Region
Tampa, Florida
Tampa Bay Little League
West Region
Tucson, Arizona
Tucson Mountain Little League

== Results ==
Upper round 1
- | Pennsylvania | 0
– | Arizona | 1
– | Florida | 5
– | Indiana | 1
Lower round 1
0–1 | Pennsylvania | 1
0–1 | Indiana | 7

Upper final
1–0 | Florida | 4
1–0 | Arizona | 3
Lower final
1–1 | Arizona | 3
1–1 | Indiana | 0

Championship
2–0 | Florida | 1 | –
2–1 | Arizona | 0 | –

1986 Little League Softball World Series Champions
Tampa Bay Little League
Tampa, Florida
