= 2019 Little League Softball World Series =

Tournament details
- Dates: August 7–August 14
- Teams: 10

Final positions
- Champions: Salisbury, North Carolina; Rowan Little League
- Runners-up: River Ridge, Louisiana; Eastbank Little League

The 2019 Little League Softball World Series was held in Portland, Oregon from August 7 to August 14, 2019. Ten teams, four international teams and six from the United States, competed for the Little League Softball World Series Championship.

== Teams ==
Each team that competed in the tournament came out of one of the 10 regions.

Pool A	Pool B
Asia-Pacific Region; Bacolod, Philippines; Negros Occidental LL	Canada Region; Victoria, British Columbia; Hampton LL
Central Region; Polk City, Iowa; Central Iowa LL	Europe-Africa Region; Milan, Italy; Lombardia LL
East Region; South Williamsport, Pennsylvania; South LL	Host District (Oregon District 4); Portland, Oregon; Willow Creek LL
Latin America Region; Mexico City, Mexico; Olmeca LL	Southeast Region; Salisbury, North Carolina; Rowan LL
West Region; Honolulu, Hawaii; Honolulu LL	Southwest Region; River Ridge, Louisiana; Eastbank LL

== Results ==
Pool A
Rank	Region	Record
1	Hawaii	4–0
2	Pennsylvania	2–2
3	Mexico	2–2
4	Iowa	2–2
5	Philippines	0–4

Pool B
Rank	Region	Record
1	North Carolina	4–0
2	Louisiana	3–1
3	Oregon	2–2
4	Italy	1–3
5	Canada	0–4

All times US EST.

Pool	Away	Score	Home	Score
August 7
A	Pennsylvania	3	Philippines	1
B	Oregon	6	Canada	5
B	North Carolina	7	Louisiana	0
A	Hawaii	11	Iowa	1
August 8
B	Louisiana	17	Canada	4
A	Hawaii	7	Pennsylvania	5
B	Oregon	12	Italy	4
A	Mexico	2	Philippines	0
August 9
B	North Carolina	12	Italy	2
A	Mexico	13	Iowa	5
A	Hawaii	7	Philippines	0
B	Oregon	2	Louisiana	3
August 10
A	Iowa	12	Philippines	2
B	North Carolina	7	Oregon	1
A	Mexico	1	Pennsylvania	3
B	Canada	0	Italy	10
August 11
A	Hawaii	8	Mexico	0
B	Italy	0	Louisiana	10
B	Canada	0	North Carolina	10
A	Pennsylvania	2	Iowa	4
August 13
Consolation	Philippines	8	Canada	0
August 14
Consolation	Hawaii	7	Iowa	4
Consolation	Pennsylvania	6	Mexico	1

=== Elimination round ===
Quarterfinals
A2	Pennsylvania	0
B3	Oregon	2
B1	North Carolina	4
A4	Iowa	0
B2	Louisiana	1
A3	Mexico	0
A1	Hawaii	1
B4	Italy	4

Semifinals
B3	Oregon	2
B1	North Carolina	3
B2	Louisiana	9
B4	Italy	1

Finals
B1	North Carolina	4
B2	Louisiana	1
Third place
B3	Oregon	0
B4	Italy	1

2019 Little League Softball World Series Champions
Rowan County Little League
Salisbury, North Carolina
