= 1991 Little League Softball World Series =

Tournament details
- Dates: August 12–August 17
- Teams: 5

Final positions
- Champions: Naples, Florida; Greater Naples Little League
- Runners-up: Glasgow, Delaware; Canal Little League

The 1991 Little League Softball World Series was held in Kalamazoo, Michigan from August 12 to August 17, 1991. Five teams, one international team and four from the United States, competed for the Little League Softball World Series Championship in a double-elimination tournament.

== Teams ==
Each team that competed in the tournament came out of one of five qualifying regions.

United States Regions	International Regions
Central Region; Tallmadge, Ohio; Tallmadge Little League	Canada Region; Victoria, British Columbia; Lake Hill Little League
East Region; Glasgow, Delaware; Canal Little League	
South Region; Naples, Florida; Greater Naples Little League	
West Region; Keizer, Oregon; Keizer Little League	

== Results ==
Upper round 1
—	Florida	2
—	Ohio	0
Lower round 1
0–1	Canada	0
0–1	Ohio	30

Upper round 2
–	Oregon	6
1–0	Florida	9
—	Canada	2
—	Delaware	20
Lower round 2
0–1	Oregon	2
1–1	Ohio	0

Upper final
2–0	Florida	2
1–0	Delaware	1
Lower final
1–1	Delaware	6
2–1	Oregon	1

Championship
3–0	Florida	2	–
2–1	Delaware	0	–

1991 Little League Softball World Series Champions
Greater Naples Little League
Naples, Florida
