= 1983 Little League Softball World Series =

Tournament details
- Dates: August 16–August 20
- Teams: 4

Final positions
- Champions: Naples, Florida; Greater Naples Little League
- Runners-up: (Washington (state)) Vancouver, Washington; Alcoa Little League

The 1983 Little League Softball World Series was held in Kalamazoo, Michigan from August 16 to August 20, 1983. Four teams, all from the United States, competed for the Little League Softball World Series Championship in a double-elimination tournament.

== Teams ==
Each team that competed in the tournament came out of one of four qualifying regions.

United States Regions
Central Region
Tallmadge, Ohio
Tallmadge Little League
East Region
Minersville, Pennsylvania
Minersville Little League
South Region
Naples, Florida
Greater Naples Little League
West Region
(Washington (state)) Vancouver, Washington
Alcoa Little League

== Results ==
Upper round 1
-	Pennsylvania	2
–	Florida	4
–	(Washington (state)) Washington	2
–	Ohio	1
Lower round 1
0–1	Pennsylvania	5
0–1	Ohio	2

Upper final
1–0	(Washington (state)) Washington	0
1–0	Florida	1
Lower final
1–1	(Washington (state)) Washington	11
1–1	Pennsylvania	0

Championship
2–0	Florida	0	5
2–1	(Washington (state)) Washington	2	2

1983 Little League Softball World Series Champions
Greater Naples Little League
Naples, Florida
