= 2016 Little League Softball World Series =

Tournament details
- Dates: August 10–August 17
- Teams: 10

Final positions
- Champions: Helotes, Texas; Greater Helotes Little League
- Runners-up: Salisbury, North Carolina; Rowan Little League

The 2016 Little League Softball World Series was held in Portland, Oregon from August 10 to August 17, 2016. Ten teams, four international teams and six from the United States, competed for the Little League Softball World Series Championship.

== Teams ==
Each team that competed in the tournament came out of one of ten qualifying regions.

Pool A	Pool B
East Region; Robbinsville, New Jersey; Robbinsville Little League	Asia-Pacific Region; Makati, Philippines; ILLAM Little League
Europe-Africa Region; Alkmaar, Netherlands; Noord Holland Little League	Canada Region; Victoria, British Columbia; Hampton Little League
Host District (Oregon District 4); Portland, Oregon; Lincoln Little League	Central Region; Grandville, Michigan; Grandville Little League
Latin America Region; Coamo, Puerto Rico; Softball Femenino Comao Little League	Southeast Region; Salisbury, North Carolina; Rowan Little League
Southwest Region; Helotes, Texas; Greater Helotes Little League	West Region; St. George, Utah; Snow Canyon Little League

== Results ==
Pool A
Rank	Region	Record
1	Texas	4–0
2	New Jersey	3–1
3	Oregon	2–2
4	Netherlands	1–3
5	Puerto Rico	0–4

Pool B
Rank	Region	Record
1	North Carolina	4–0
2	Michigan	3–1
3	Utah	2–2
4	Canada	1–3
5	Philippines	0–4

Pool	Away	Score	Home	Score
August 10
A	Texas	19	Netherlands	4
B	Utah	22	Philippines	1
B	Canada	2	North Carolina	16
A	Oregon	8	Puerto Rico	4
August 11
B	Utah	19	Canada	10
A	Texas	10	Oregon	0
B	Philippines	5	Michigan	14
A	Netherlands	3	New Jersey	16
August 12
B	Michigan	0	North Carolina	6
A	New Jersey	10	Puerto Rico	0
A	Netherlands	1	Oregon	11
B	Canada	12	Philippines	11
August 13
A	Puerto Rico	2	Netherlands	6
B	North Carolina	16	Philippines	2
A	New Jersey	1	Texas	4
B	Michigan	3	Utah	1
August 14
A	Oregon	3	New Jersey	10
B	Canada	6	Michigan	16
B	North Carolina	6	Utah	0 (forfeit)
A	Puerto Rico	1	Texas	11
August 16
Consolation	Puerto Rico	10	Philippines	12
August 17
Consolation	Utah	10	Netherlands	0
Consolation	Oregon	7	Canada	5

=== Elimination round ===
Quarterfinals
A2	New Jersey	10
B3	Utah	0
B1	North Carolina	10
A4	Netherlands	0
B2	Michigan	3
A3	Oregon	2
A1	Texas	10
B4	Canada	0

Semifinals
A2	New Jersey	0
B1	North Carolina	3
B2	Michigan	0
A1	Texas	6

Finals
B1	North Carolina	1
A1	Texas	5
Third place
A2	New Jersey	3
B2	Michigan	2

2016 Little League Softball World Series Champions
Greater Helotes Little League
Helotes, Texas
