= 2011 Little League Softball World Series =

Tournament details
- Dates: August 11–August 17
- Teams: 10

Final positions
- Champions: Sterling, Illinois; Sterling Little League
- Runners-up: Waco, Texas; Midway Little League

The 2011 Little League Softball World Series was held in Portland, Oregon from August 11 to August 17, 2011. Ten teams, four international teams and six from the United States, competed for the Little League Softball World Series Championship.

== Teams ==
Each team that competed in the tournament came out of one of ten qualifying regions.

Pool A	Pool B
Canada Region; Windsor, Ontario; Windsor South Little League	Asia-Pacific Region; Muntinlupa, Philippines; Muntinlupa Little League
Central Region; Sterling, Illinois; Sterling Little League	East Region (New York (state)) New City, New York; New City Little League
Latin America Region; Maunabo, Puerto Rico; ASOFEM Little League	Europe-Middle East-Africa Region; Milan, Italy; Lombardia Little League
Southwest Region; Waco, Texas; Midway Little League	Host District (Oregon District 4); Portland, Oregon; Willow Creek-Portland Little League
West Region; Los Angeles, California; Westchester-Del Rey Little League	Southeast Region; Wilkes County, North Carolina; Wilkes County Little League

== Results ==
Pool A
Rank	Region	Record
1	Illinois	4–0
2	Texas	3–1
3	Puerto Rico	2–2
4	California	1–3
5	Canada	0–4

Pool B
Rank	Region	Record
1	North Carolina	4–0
2	Philippines	3–1
3	(New York (state)) New York	2–2
4	Oregon	1–3
5	Italy	0–4

Pool	Away	Score	Home	Score
August 11
A	California	8	Puerto Rico	9
B	Oregon	1	North Carolina	13
B	Italy	8	Philippines	18
A	Texas	0	Illinois	2
August 12
B	(New York (state)) New York	7	Italy	1
A	Illinois	15	Puerto Rico	1
A	California	15	Canada	0
B	Oregon	2	Philippines	7
August 13
B	Oregon	8	Italy	0
A	Texas	5	California	4
A	Canada	2	Puerto Rico	12
B	(New York (state)) New York	3	North Carolina	'4
August 14
A	Canada	0	Texas	11
B	Italy	1	North Carolina	10
A	Illinois	7	California	2
B	Philippines	4	(New York (state)) New York	3
August 15
B	North Carolina	16	Philippines	1
A	Illinois	14	Canada	1
A	Texas	4	Puerto Rico	0
B	(New York (state)) New York	14	Oregon	4
August 17
7th Place	California	10	Oregon	3
5th Place	Puerto Rico	0	(New York (state)) New York	3

=== Elimination round ===
Semifinals
A1	Illinois	13
B2	Philippines	0
B1	North Carolina	5
A2	Texas	9

Finals
A1	Illinois	7
A2	Texas	5
Third place
B2	Philippines	4
B1	North Carolina	10

2011 Little League Softball World Series Champions
Sterling Little League
Sterling, Illinois
