= 1976 Little League Softball World Series =

Tournament details
- Dates: August 16–August 22
- Teams: 4

Final positions
- Champions: Salinas, California; Salinas Little League
- Runners-up: Sturgeon Bay, Wisconsin; Sturgeon Bay Little League

The 1976 Little League Softball World Series was held in Portland, Oregon from August 16 to August 22, 1976. Four teams, all from the United States, competed for the Little League Softball World Series Championship in a single-elimination tournament.

== Teams ==
Each team that competed in the tournament came out of one of four qualifying regions.

United States Regions
Central Region
Sturgeon Bay, Wisconsin
Sturgeon Bay Little League
East Region
(New York (state)) Queens, New York
Hollis-Bellaire-Queens Village-Bellrose Little League
South Region
(Georgia (U.S. state)) Columbus, Georgia
Pioneer Little League
West Region
Salinas, California
Salinas Little League

== Results ==
Semifinals
California | 7
(New York (state)) New York | 3
Wisconsin | 3
(Georgia (U.S. state)) Georgia | 2

Championship
California | 4
Wisconsin | 1
Third Place Game
(New York (state)) New York | 8
(Georgia (U.S. state)) Georgia | 9

1976 Little League Softball World Series Champions
Salinas Little League
Salinas, California
