= 1974 Little League Softball World Series =

Tournament details
- Dates: August 27–August 31
- Teams: 4

Final positions
- Champions: Tampa, Florida; Wellswood Little League
- Runners-up: (Washington (state)) Kirkland, Washington; Kirkland Little League

The 1974 Little League Softball World Series was the first Little League Softball championship tournament held in Freeport, New York from August 27 to August 31, 1974. Four teams, all from the United States, competed for the Little League Softball World Series Championship in a single-elimination tournament.

== Teams ==
Each team that competed in the tournament came out of one of four qualifying regions.

United States Regions
Central Region
Dayton, Ohio
North Riverdale Girls Little League
East Region
(New York (state)) Dix Hills, New York
Half Hollow Hills Little League
South Region
Tampa, Florida
Wellswood Little League
West Region
(Washington (state)) Kirkland, Washington
Kirkland Little League

== Results ==
Semifinals
(New York (state)) New York	0
Florida	8
(Washington (state)) Washington	8
Ohio	7

Championship
Florida	4
(Washington (state)) Washington	1
Third Place Game
(New York (state)) New York	3
Ohio	1

1974 Little League Softball World Series Champions
Wellswood Little League
Tampa, Florida
