= 2004 Little League Softball World Series =

Tournament details
- Dates: August 12–August 19
- Teams: 10

Final positions
- Champions: Waco, Texas; Midway Little League
- Runners-up: McLean, Virginia; McLean Little League

The 2004 Little League Softball World Series was held in Portland, Oregon from August 12 to August 19, 2004. Ten teams, four international teams and six from the United States, competed for the Little League Softball World Series Championship.

== Teams ==
Each team that competed in the tournament came out of one of ten qualifying regions.

Pool A	Pool B
Canada Region; Victoria, British Columbia; Beacon Hill Little League	Asia-Pacific Region; Bacolod, Philippines; DepEd Bacolod City Little League
East Region; Upper Darby, Pennsylvania; Upper Darby Little League	Central Region; Essexville, Michigan; Essexville-Hampton Little League
Host District (Oregon District 4); Beaverton, Oregon; Beaverton Area Little League	Europe-Middle East-Africa Region; Utrecht, Netherlands; Windmills Little League
Latin America Region; Maunabo, Puerto Rico; Rosario Y. Cardona Little League	South Region; McLean, Virginia; McLean Little League
Southwest Region; Waco, Texas; Midway Little League	West Region; Pendleton, Oregon; Pendleton Little League

== Results ==
Pool A
Rank	Region	Record
1	Texas	4–0
2	Canada	3–1
3	Oregon (Host)	2–2
4	Pennsylvania	1–3
5	Puerto Rico	0–4

Pool B
Rank	Region	Record
1	Virginia	4–0
2	Philippines	2–2
3	Michigan	2–2
4	Oregon (West)	2–2
5	Netherlands	0–4

Pool	Away	Score	Home	Score
August 12
A	Pennsylvania	7	Puerto Rico	0
B	Oregon (West)	2	Virginia	4
B	Netherlands	0	Philippines	13
A	Texas	15	Oregon (Host)	0
August 13
B	Michigan	14	Netherlands	0
B	Oregon (West)	3	Philippines	1
A	Pennsylvania	2	Canada	4
A	Oregon (Host)	11	Puerto Rico	2
August 14
A	Canada	10	Puerto Rico	3
A	Texas	9	Pennsylvania	0
B	Oregon (West)	10	Netherlands	0
B	Michigan	3	Virginia	9
August 15
A	Canada	2	Texas	14
B	Netherlands	0	Virginia	4
A	Oregon (Host)	3	Pennsylvania	0
B	Michigan	2	Philippines	7
August 16
B	Michigan	5	Oregon (West)	3
B	Virginia	5	Philippines	4
A	Texas	13	Puerto Rico	1
A	Oregon (Host)	3	Canada	4
August 18
9th Place	Puerto Rico	16	Netherlands	2
7th Place	Pennsylvania	5	Oregon (West)	4
5th Place	Oregon (Host)	2	Michigan	3

=== Elimination round ===
Semifinals
A1	Texas	4
B2	Philippines	0
B1	Virginia	11
A2	Canada	6

Finals
A1	Texas	18
B1	Virginia	5
Third place
B2	Philippines	2
A2	Canada	0

2004 Little League Softball World Series Champions
Midway Little League
Waco, Texas
