= 2021 Little League Softball World Series =

Tournament details
- Dates: August 11–August 18
- Teams: 10

Final positions
- Champions: Muskogee, Oklahoma; Green Country Little League
- Runners-up: Chesterfield, Virginia; Chesterfield Little League

The 2021 Little League Softball World Series was held in Greenville, North Carolina from August 11 to August 18, 2021. Ten teams from the United States competed for the Little League Softball World Series Championship.

== Teams ==
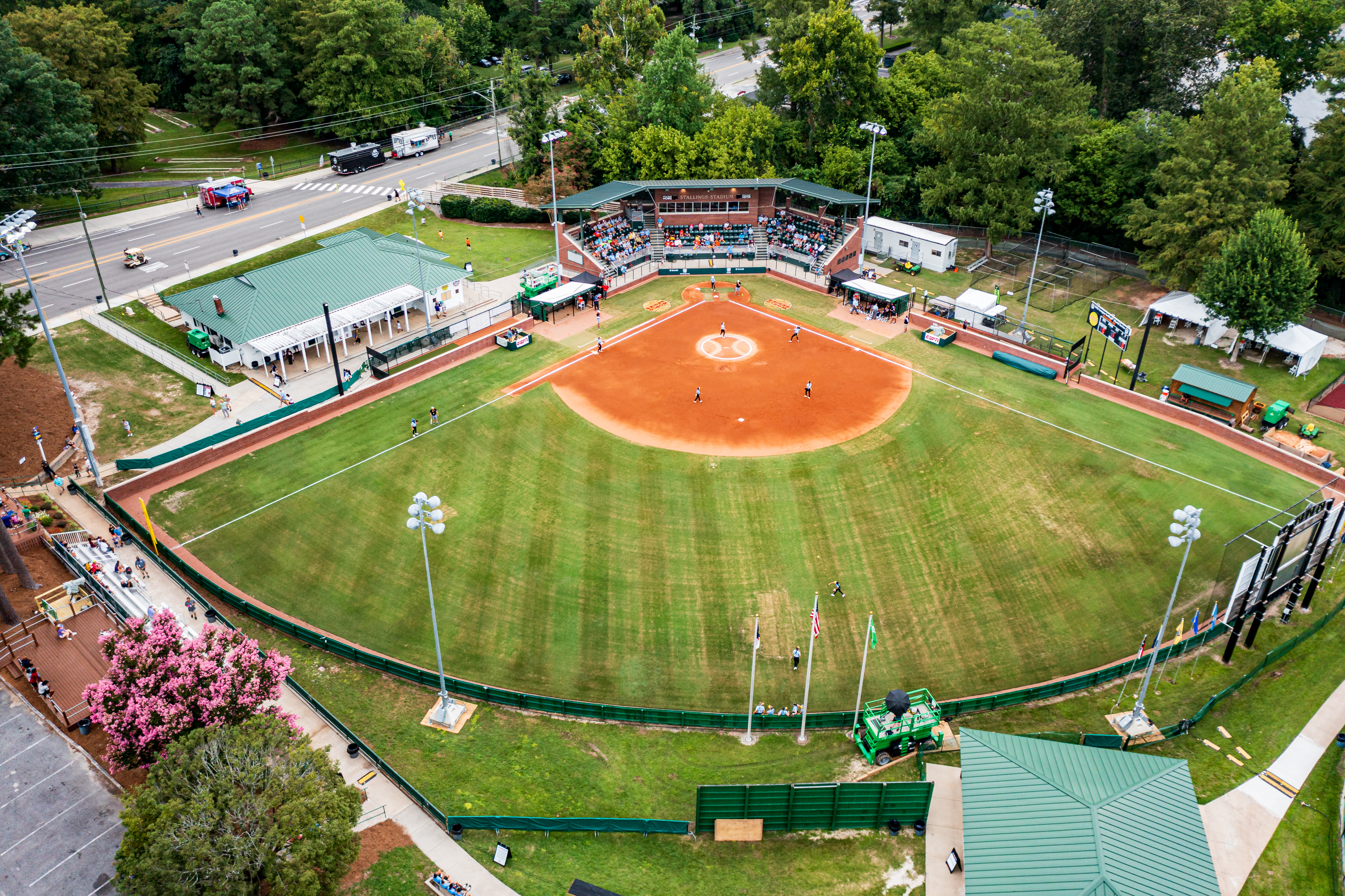
Stallings Stadium in Elm Street Park served as host.

Each team that competed in the tournament came out of one of the 10 regions.

Jennie Finch Pool Teams	Jessica Mendoza Pool Teams
Columbia, Missouri; Daniel Boone LL	Muskogee, Oklahoma; Green Country LL
(New York (state)) Orangeburg, New York; South Orangetown LL	Las Vegas, Nevada; Summerlin South LL
Chesterfield, Virginia; Chesterfield LL	Robbinsville, New Jersey; Robbinsville LL
Robinson, Texas; Robinson LL	Zionsville, Indiana; Zionsville LL
Cave Creek, Arizona; Cactus Foothills LL	Salisbury, North Carolina; Rowan LL

== Results ==
Jennie Finch Pool
Rank	Region	Record	Runs Allowed
1	Chesterfield, Virginia	3–1	6
2	Columbia, Missouri	3–1	7
3	Robinson, Texas	3-1	8
4	Arizona	0-4	25
DSQ	(New York (state)) New York	1-3	10

Jessica Mendoza Pool
Rank	Region	Record	Runs Allowed
1	Oklahoma	3–0	5
2	North Carolina	3–1	13
3	Nevada	2-2	18
4	New Jersey	1-3	13
5	Indiana	0-3	20

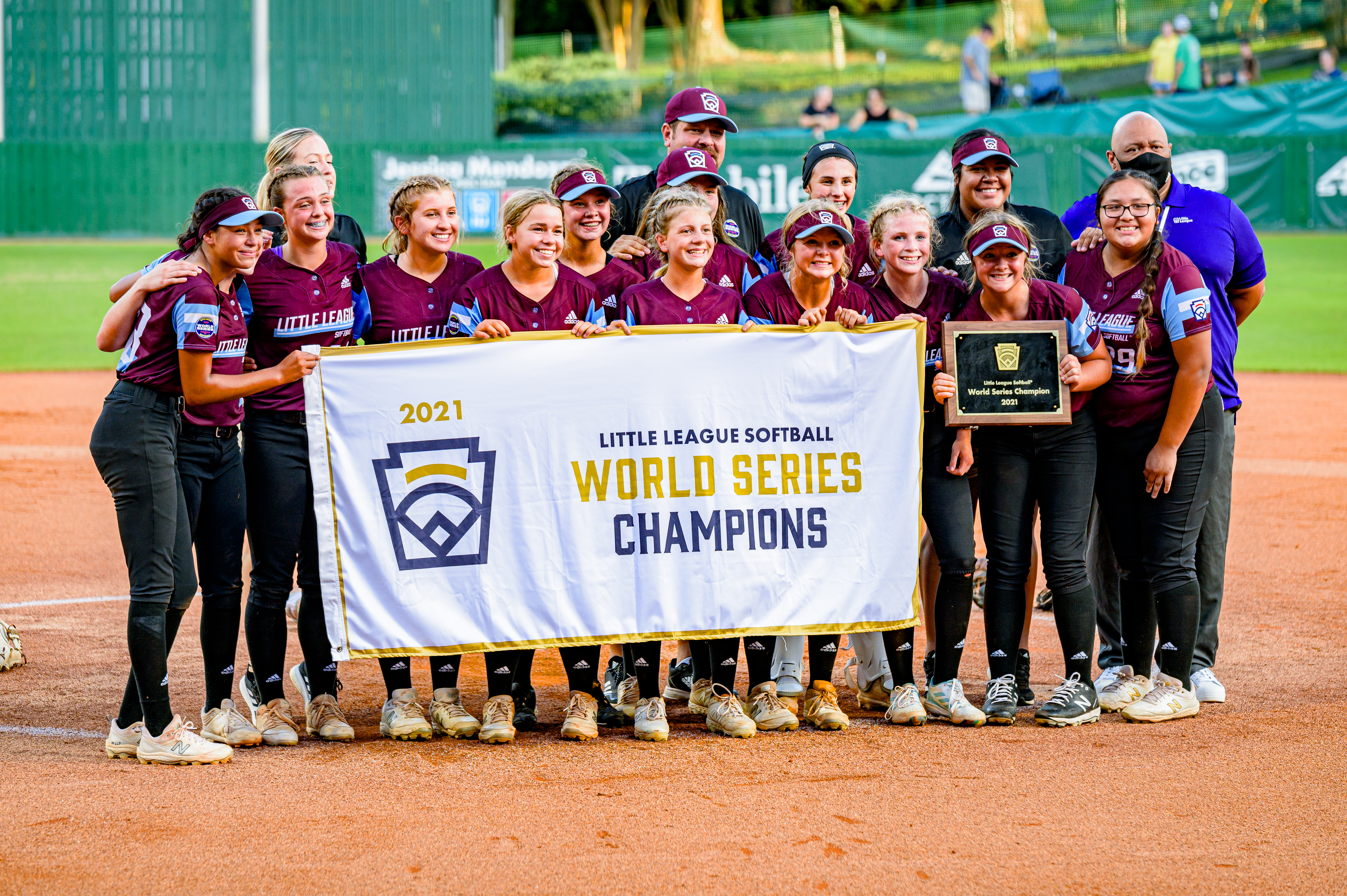
The Champions from Green County LL in Oklahoma

All times US EST.

Pool	Away	Score	Home	Score	Time
August 11
Finch	Virginia	4	Missouri	1	10:00am
Mendoza	New Jersey	1	Oklahoma	3	1:00pm
Mendoza	Indiana	0	North Carolina	7	4:00pm
Finch	Arizona	0	(New York (state)) New York	4	7:00pm
August 12
Mendoza	Oklahoma	10	North Carolina	0	10:00am
Finch	Virginia	4	Arizona	1	1:00pm
Mendoza	Nevada	5	New Jersey	2	4:00pm
Finch	Missouri	5	Texas	3	7:00pm
August 13
Mendoza	Nevada	11	Indiana	3	10:00am
Finch	(New York (state)) New York	0	Texas	2	1:00pm
Finch	Arizona	0	Missouri	6	4:00pm
Mendoza	North Carolina	5	New Jersey	2	7:00pm
August 14
Finch	Missouri	2	(New York (state)) New York	0	10:00am
Mendoza	Indiana	0	New Jersey	2	1:00pm
Finch	Virginia	2	Texas	4	4:00pm
Mendoza	Oklahoma	9	Nevada	4	7:00pm
August 15
Finch	Arizona	1	Texas	11	3:25am
Mendoza	Nevada	1	North Carolina	4	4:20pm
Mendoza	Oklahoma		Indiana		Cancelled
Finch	(New York (state)) New York	0	Chesterfield, Virginia	6	7:00pm

=== Elimination round ===
Quarter-finals
August 16 – 10:00 am
#3 Mendoza; Nevada	0
#2 Finch; Missouri	4
August 16 – 1:00 pm
#4 Finch Arizona	0
#1 Mendoza Oklahoma	4
August 16 – 4:00 pm
#3 Finch Texas	4
#2 Mendoza North Carolina	4
August 16 – 8:32 pm
#4 Mendoza New Jersey	0
#1 Finch Virginia	1

Semi-finals
August 17 – 4:00 pm
Missouri	0
Oklahoma	7
August 17 – 7:00 pm
Texas	5
Virginia	7

Final
August 18 – 5:00 pm
Oklahoma	9
Virginia	1
Third place
August 18 – 1:00 pm
Missouri	10
Texas	1

2021 Little League Softball World Series Champions
Green Country Little League
Muskogee, Oklahoma
