= 1999 Little League Softball World Series =

Tournament details
- Dates: August 15–August 21
- Teams: 8

Final positions
- Champions: Waco, Texas; Midway Little League
- Runners-up: Stockton, California; Oakpark Little League

The 1999 Little League Softball World Series was held in Portland, Oregon from August 15 to August 21, 1999. Eight teams, four international teams and four from the United States, competed for the Little League Softball World Series Championship in a double-elimination tournament.

== Teams ==
Each team that competed in the tournament came out of one of eight qualifying regions.

United States Regions	International Regions
Central Region; Appleton, Wisconsin; South Appleton Little League	Canada Region; Ancaster, Ontario; Ancaster Little League
East Region; Warrington, Pennsylvania; Warrington Warwick Little League	Europe Region; Ramstein AFB, Germany; KMC American Little League
South Region; Waco, Texas; Midway Little League	Far East Region; Bacolod, Philippines; Bacolod City Little League
West Region; Stockton, California; Oakpark Little League	Latin America Region; Maunabo, Puerto Rico; Rosario Y. Cardona Little League

== Results ==
=== Championship Bracket ===
Upper round 1	Upper round 2	Upper final	Championship
—	Texas	12
—	Wisconsin	4
1–0	Texas	11
1–0	Puerto Rico	0
—	Puerto Rico	14
—	Germany	0
2–0	Texas	3
2–0	California	2
—	Canada	9
—	Philippines	7
1–0	Canada	0
1–0	California	10
—	California	11
—	Pennsylvania	0	3–0	Texas	6	–
3–1	California	1	–
Lower round 1	Lower round 2	Lower round 3	Lower final
1–1	Wisconsin	7
0–1	Wisconsin	21	1–1	Canada	6	3–1	Pennsylvania	4
0–1	Germany	3	2–1	Wisconsin	1	2–1	California	5
2–1	Pennsylvania	3
1–1	Pennsylvania	5
0–1	Philippines	6	1–1	Puerto Rico	1
0–1	Pennsylvania	15

=== Consolation Bracket ===
Quarterfinals
Puerto Rico	20
Germany	5
Philippines	4
Canada	5

Semifinals
Puerto Rico	10
Pennsylvania	8
Wisconsin	5
Canada	2

Final
Puerto Rico	4
Wisconsin	14

1999 Little League Softball World Series Champions
Midway Little League
Waco, Texas
