= 2023 Little League Softball World Series =

Softball Tournament

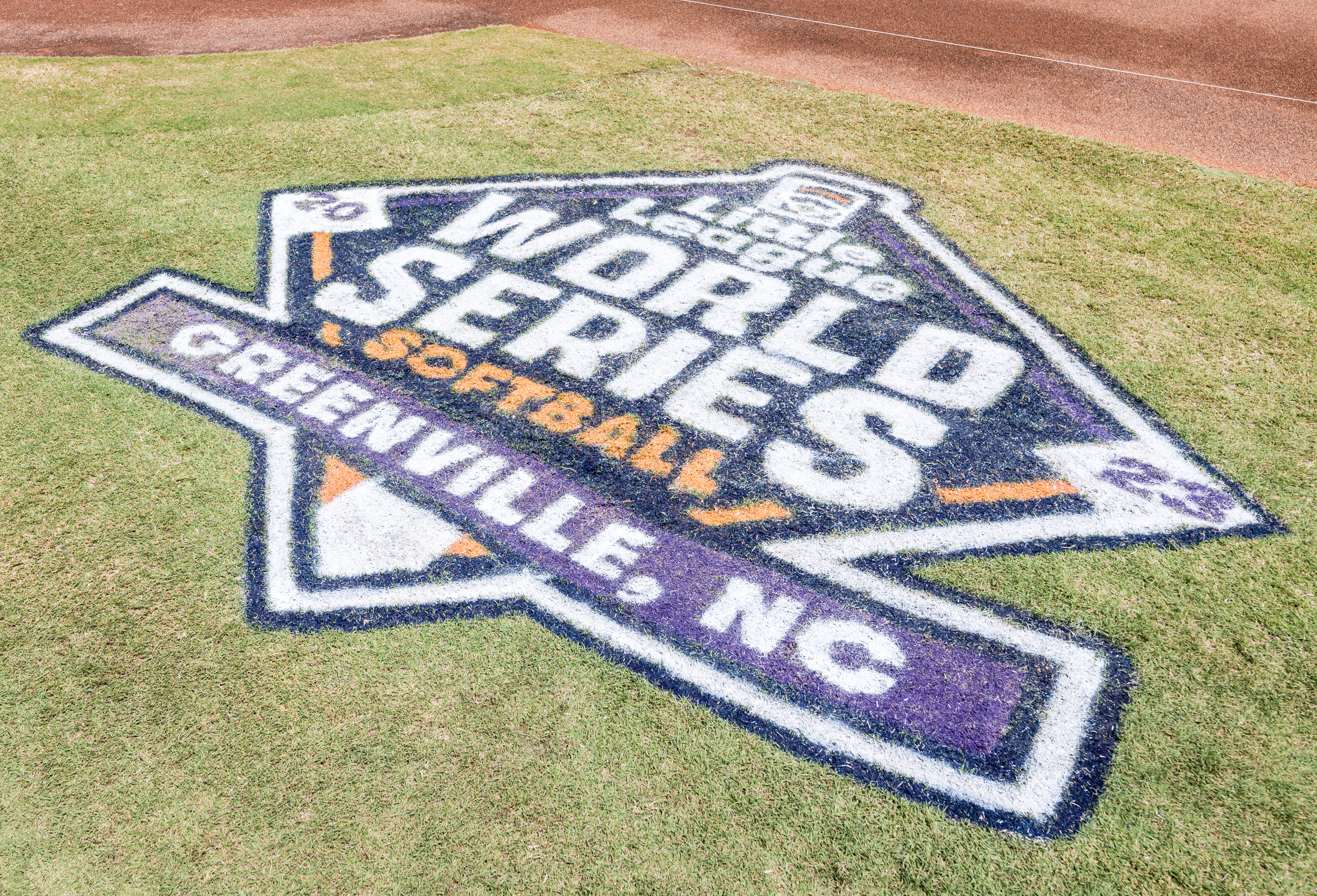

Tournament details
- Dates: August 6–August 13
- Teams: 12

Final positions
- Champions: (New York (state)) Massapequa, New York; Massapequa International LL
- Runners-up: Winterville, North Carolina; Pitt County Girls Softball LL

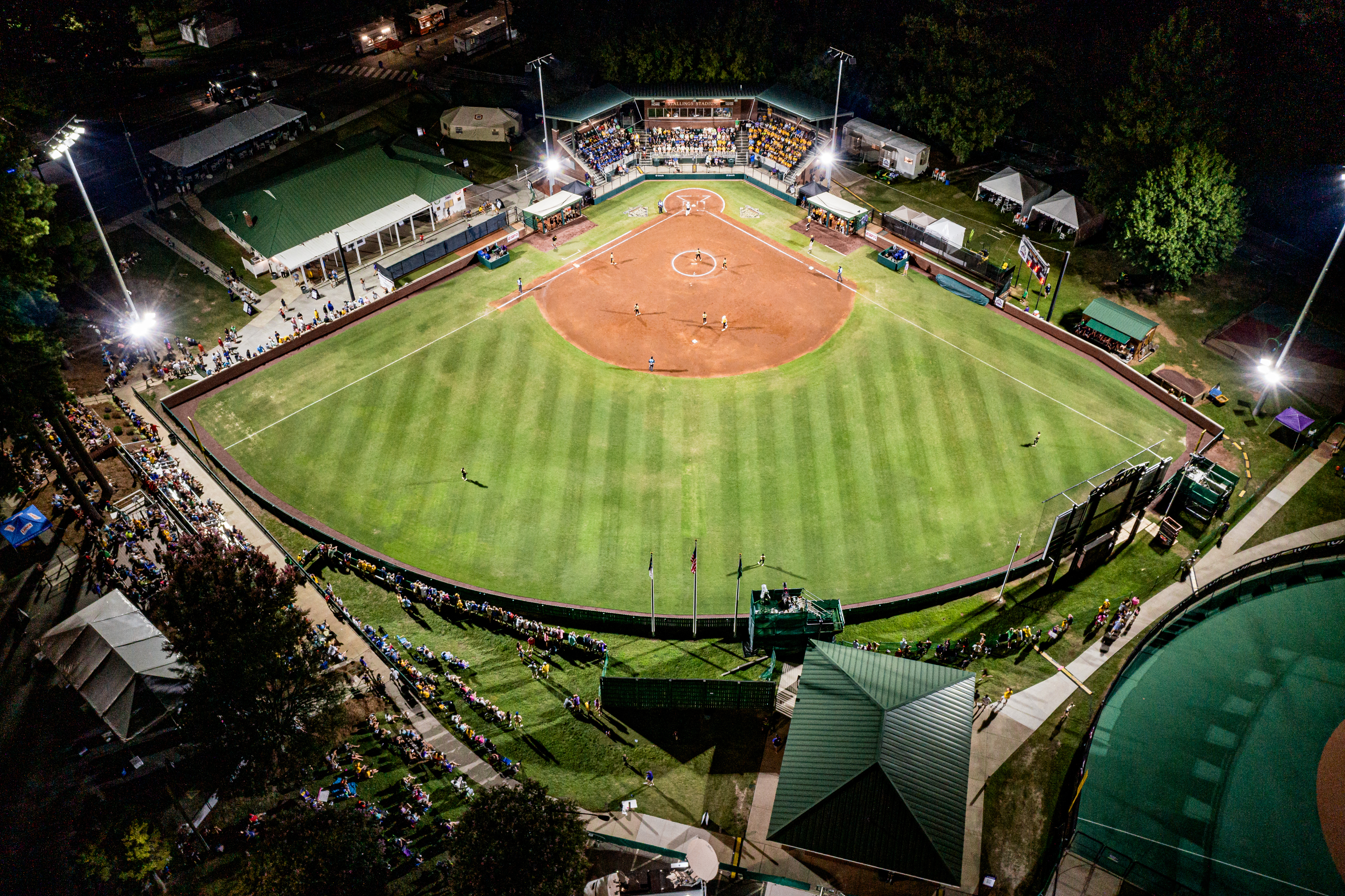
Stallings Stadium in Greenville served as host

The 2023 Little League Softball World Series was held in Greenville, North Carolina from August 6 to August 13, 2023.

== Teams ==
Each team that competed in the tournament came out of one of 12 qualifying regions.

Purple Bracket	Orange Bracket
Asia-Pacific Region; Bacolod, Philippines; Negros Occidental LL	Canada Region; St. Albert, Alberta; St. Albert Softball LL
Central Region; Austintown, Ohio; Austintown LL	Europe-Africa Region; Milan, Italy; Lombardia LL
Host Region (North Carolina); Salisbury, North Carolina; Rowan LL	Latin America Region; Guayama, Puerto Rico; Guayama Softball LL
Southeast Region; Winterville, North Carolina; Pitt County Girls Softball LL	Mid-Atlantic Region (New York (state)) Massapequa, New York; Massapequa International LL
Southwest Region; Hewitt, Texas; Midway LL	New England Region; Milford, Connecticut; Milford LL
West Region; San Jose, California; Almaden LL	Northwest Region; Bend, Oregon; Bend North LL

== Results ==
=== Purple Bracket ===
==== Winner's Bracket ====
First Round
Ohio	0
North Carolina (H)	5
Texas	6
North Carolina (SE)	1

Second Round
North Carolina (H)	10
Philippines	0
Texas	11
California	0

Quarterfinals
North Carolina (H)	1
Texas	4

==== Elimination Bracket ====
First Round
Ohio	4
California	0
North Carolina (SE)	4
Philippines	2

Second Round
Ohio	1
North Carolina (SE)	16
Elimination Bracket Final
North Carolina (SE)	6
North Carolina (H)	5

=== Orange Bracket ===
==== Winner's Bracket ====
First Round
Puerto Rico	11
Canada	9
Italy	1
Connecticut	11

Second Round
Puerto Rico	4
Oregon	2
Connecticut	5
(New York (state)) New York	6

Quarterfinals
Puerto Rico	2
(New York (state)) New York	5

==== Elimination Bracket ====
First Round
Canada	9
Connecticut	12
Italy	9
Oregon	5

Second Round
Connecticut	9
Italy	5
Elimination Bracket Final
Connecticut	10
Puerto Rico	0

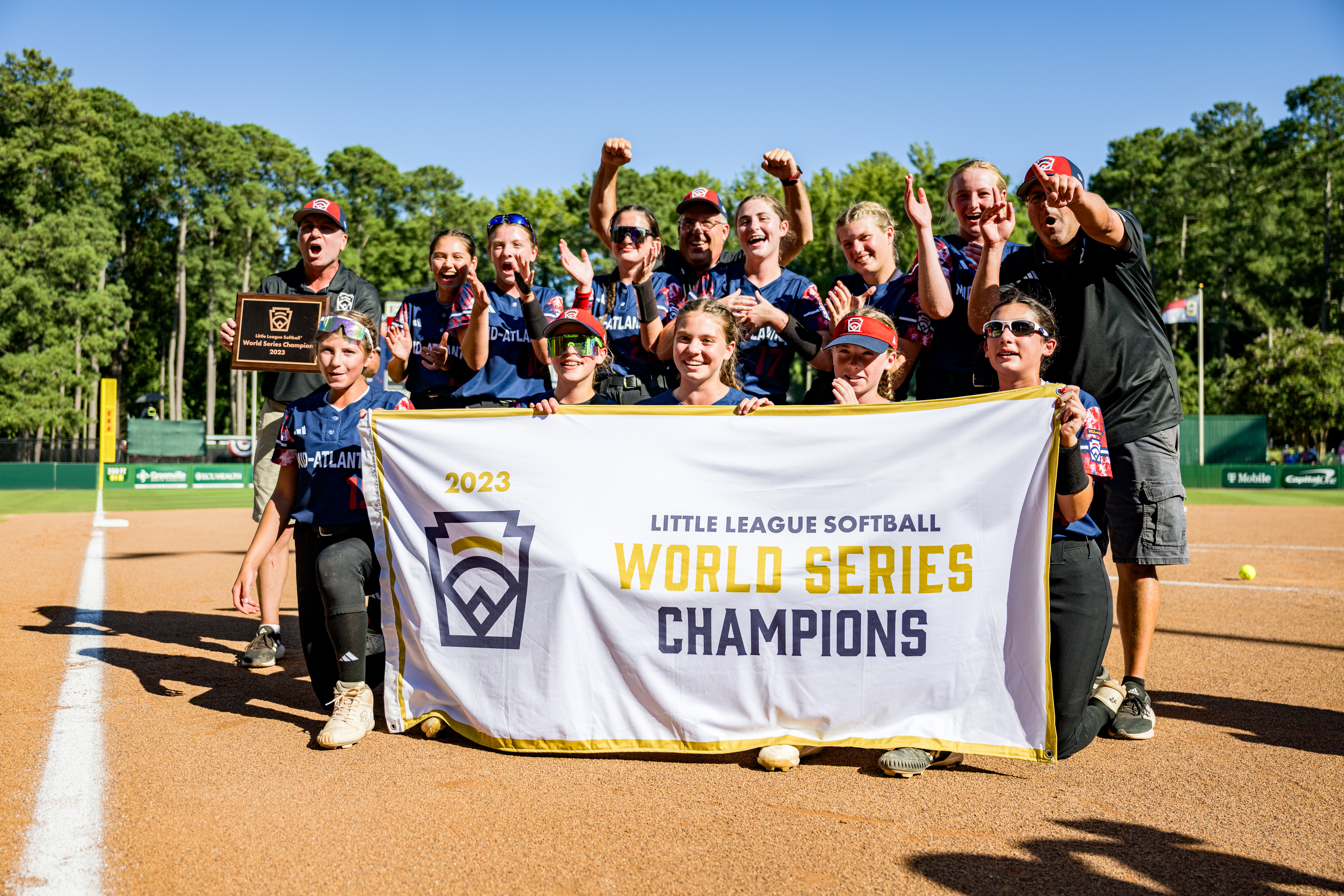
The champions from Massapequa International LL

=== Semifinals & Finals ===
Bracket Championships
Texas	3
North Carolina (SE)	4
(New York (state)) New York	5
Connecticut	1

Championship Game
North Carolina (SE)	2
(New York (state)) New York	5
Third Place Game
Texas	5
Connecticut	1

2023 Little League Softball World Series Champions
Massapequa International Little League
Massapequa, New York
