= 2022 Little League Softball World Series =

Softball Tournament

Tournament details
- Dates: August 9–August 15
- Teams: 12

Final positions
- Champions: Hewitt, Texas; Midway Little League
- Runners-up: Delmar, Maryland; Delmar Little League

The 2022 Little League Softball World Series was held in Greenville, North Carolina from August 9 to August 15, 2022.

== Teams ==
Each team that competed in the tournament came out of one of 12 qualifying regions.

| Purple Bracket | Orange Bracket |
|---|---|
| Asia-Pacific Region; Bacolod, Philippines; Negros Occidental LL | Host Region (North Carolina); Winterville, North Carolina; Pitt County Girls Softball LL |
| Canada Region; St. Albert, Alberta; St Albert/YYC Softball LL | Latin America Region; Guayama, Puerto Rico; Guayama Softball LL |
| Central Region; Columbia, Missouri; Daniel Boone LL | Northwest Region (Washington (state)) Issaquah, Washington; Issaquah LL |
| Europe-Africa Region; Bologna, Italy; Emilia Romagna LL | Southeast Region; Chesterfield, Virginia; Chesterfield LL |
| Mid-Atlantic Region; Delmar, Maryland; Delmar LL | Southwest Region; Hewitt, Texas; Midway LL |
| New England Region; Milford, Connecticut; Milford LL | West Region; La Verne, California; La Verne LL |

== Results ==
=== Purple Bracket ===
==== Winner's Bracket ====
First Round
Maryland | 3
Missouri | 1
Philippines | 1
Canada | 0

Second Round
Connecticut | 1
Maryland | 2
Italy | 1
Philippines | 4

Quarterfinals
Maryland | 2
Philippines | 0

==== Elimination Bracket ====
First Round
Missouri | 12
Italy | 0
Canada | 0
Connecticut | 4

Second Round
Missouri | 2
Connecticut | 8
Elimination Bracket Final
Connecticut | 0
Philippines | 1

=== Orange Bracket ===
==== Winner's Bracket ====
First Round
(Washington (state)) Washington | 4
Texas | 13
North Carolina | 2
California | 9

Second Round
Puerto Rico | 0
Texas | 2
Virginia | 6
California | 1

Quarterfinals
Texas | 1
Virginia | 0

==== Elimination Bracket ====
First Round
(Washington (state)) Washington | 1
California | 7
North Carolina | 8
Puerto Rico | 0

Second Round
California | 1
North Carolina | 6
Elimination Bracket Final
North Carolina | 1
Virginia | 2

=== Semifinals & Finals ===
Bracket Championships
Maryland | 11
Philippines | 0
Texas | 5
Virginia | 1

Championship Game
Maryland | 4
Texas | 5
Consolation Game
Philippines | 0
Virginia | 9

2022 Little League Softball World Series Champions
Midway Little League
Hewitt, Texas
