= 1994 Little League Softball World Series =

Tournament details
- Dates: August 14–August 20
- Teams: 7

Final positions
- Champions: Waco, Texas; Midway Little League
- Runners-up: Gresham, Oregon; Centennial Little League

The 1994 Little League Softball World Series was held in Portland, Oregon from August 14 to August 20, 1994. Seven teams, three international teams and four from the United States, competed for the Little League Softball World Series Championship in a double-elimination tournament.

== Teams ==
Each team that competed in the tournament came out of one of seven qualifying regions.

| United States Regions | International Regions |
|---|---|
| Central Region; Essexville, Michigan; Essexville-Hampton Little League | Canada Region; Duncan, British Columbia; Duncan Little League |
| East Region; Glasgow, Delaware; Canal Little League | Europe Region; Bohemia, Czech Republic; Bohemia Little League |
| South Region; Waco, Texas; Midway Little League | Far East Region; Pampanga, Philippines; Pampanga Little League |
| West Region; Gresham, Oregon; Centennial Little League | |

== Results ==
Upper round 1 | Upper round 2 | Upper final | Final
– | Canada | 6
1–0 | Oregon | 21
– | Oregon | 17
– | Czech Republic | 2
2–0 | Oregon | 0
2–0 | Texas | 8
– | Texas | 4
– | Delaware | 0
1–0 | Texas | 6
1–0 | Michigan | 5
– | Michigan | 12
– | Philippines | 1
3–0 | Texas | 9 | 8
3–1 | Oregon | 10 | 4
Lower round 1 | Lower round 2 | Lower round 3 | Lower final
1–1 | Michigan | 17
0–1 | Delaware | 11 | 0–1 | Czech Republic | 6 | 2–1 | Oregon | 8
0–1 | Philippines | 1 | 2–1 | Michigan | 11 | 3–1 | Michigan | 5
2–1 | Delaware | 2
0–1 | Canada | 1
1–1 | Delaware | 21

1994 Little League Softball World Series Champions
Midway Little League
Waco, Texas
