= 2018 Little League Softball World Series =

Competition held in Portland, Oregon

Tournament details
- Dates: August 8–August 15
- Teams: 10

Final positions
- Champions: Wheelersburg, Ohio; Wheelersburg Little League
- Runners-up: Tunkhannock, Pennsylvania; Tunkhannock Little League

The 2018 Little League Softball World Series was held in Portland, Oregon from August 8 to August 15, 2018. Six teams from the United States and four from throughout the world competed for the Little League Softball World Series Championship.

== Teams ==
Each team that competed in the tournament came out of one of the 10 regions.

United States	International
Wheelersburg, Ohio; Central Region; Wheelersburg LL	Bacolod, Philippines; Asia-Pacific; Bacolod City West LL
Tunkhannock, Pennsylvania; East Region; Tunkhannock LL	Victoria, British Columbia; Canada; Layritz LL
Gray, Tennessee; Southeast Region; Daniel Boone LL	Prague, Czech Republic; Europe & Africa; Northwest Czech Republic LL
River Ridge, Louisiana; Southwest Region; Eastbank LL	Monterrey, Nuevo León, Mexico; Latin America; Cuauhtemoc LL
(Washington (state)) Kirkland, Washington; West Region; Kirkland LL	Only 4 International Teams
Lake Oswego, Oregon; Oregon District 4 Lake Oswego Girls Softball LL	Only 4 International Teams

== Results ==
Pool A
Rank	Region	Record	Runs Allowed	Defensive Innings	Run Ratio
1	(Pennsylvania) East	3–1	3	20	.150
2	(Washington (state)) West	3–1	20	22	.909
3	Canada	2-2	11	23	.478
4	(Tennessee) Southeast	2-2	16	21	.762
5	(Czech Republic) Europe-Africa	0–4	56	16	3.5

Pool B
Rank	Region	Record	Runs Allowed	Defensive Innings	Run Ratio
1	(Louisiana) Southwest	3–1	9	24	.375
2	Oregon D4	2-2	12	22	.545
3	(Ohio) Central	2-2	15	27	.555
4	(Philippines) Asia-Pacific	1–3	8	26	.308
5	(Mexico) Latin America	1–3	21	22	.955

All times US PST.

Pool	Away	Score	Home	Score	Time
August 8
A	Canada	0	(Pennsylvania) East	2	10:00am
B	Oregon D4	1	(Louisiana) Southwest	5	1:00pm
B	(Ohio) Central	9	(Mexico) Latin America	0	4:00pm
A	(Washington (state)) West	9	(Tennessee) Southeast	5	7:00pm
August 9
B	(Mexico) Latin America	1	(Louisiana) Southwest	8	10:00am
A	(Tennessee) Southeast	2	Canada	7	1:00pm
B	(Philippines) Asia-Pacific	0	Oregon D4	1	4:00pm
A	(Czech Republic) Europe-Africa	0	(Pennsylvania) East	17 (F/3)	7:00pm
August 10
B	(Philippines) Asia-Pacific	2	(Ohio) Central	3	10:00am
A	(Washington (state)) West	15 (F/4)	(Czech Republic) Europe-Africa	0	1:00pm
A	(Pennsylvania) East	0	(Tennessee) Southeast	1	4:00pm
B	Oregon D4	2	(Mexico) Latin America	5	7:00pm
August 11
A	(Pennsylvania) East	12	(Washington (state)) West	2	9:00am
B	Oregon D4	3	(Ohio) Central	2	1:30pm
A	Canada	9	(Czech Republic) Europe-Africa	0	4:30pm
B	(Louisiana) Southwest	4	(Philippines) Asia-Pacific	3	7:30pm
August 12
A	(Tennessee) Southeast	15 (F/4)	(Czech Republic) Europe-Africa	0	10:00am
B	(Mexico) Latin America	0	(Philippines) Asia-Pacific	2	1:00pm
B	(Louisiana) Southwest	10	(Ohio) Central	4	4:00pm
A	(Washington (state)) West	7	Canada	3	7:00pm
August 14
9th	(Mexico) Latin America	6	(Czech Republic) Europe-Africa	5	10:00am
August 15
7th	(Philippines) Asia-Pacific	6	(Tennessee) Southeast	0	10:00am
5th	Canada	4	(Washington (state)) West	14 (F/5)	12:30pm

=== Elimination round ===
Quarter-finals
August 13 – 10:00 am
A2 (Washington (state)) Washington	1
B3 Ohio	10
August 13 – 1:00 pm
A4 Tennessee	2
B1 Louisiana	9
August 13 – 4:00 pm
A3 Canada	3
B2 Oregon	4
August 13 – 7:00 pm
B4 Philippines	1
A1 Pennsylvania	2

Semi-finals
August 14 – 4:00 pm
Ohio	5
Louisiana	1
August 14 – 6:30 pm
Oregon	4
Pennsylvania	6

Final
August 15 – 7:00 pm
Ohio	3
Pennsylvania	0
Third place
August 15 – 3:00 pm
(Louisiana) Louisnana	12
Oregon	5

2018 Little League Softball World Series Champions
Wheelersburg Little League
Wheelersburg, Ohio
