= 2017 Little League Softball World Series =

Tournament details
- Dates: August 9–August 16
- Teams: 10

Final positions
- Champions: Waco, Texas; Lake Air Little League
- Runners-up: Salisbury, North Carolina; Rowan Little League

The 2017 Little League Softball World Series was held in Portland, Oregon from August 9 to August 16, 2017. Ten teams, four international teams and six from the United States, competed for the Little League Softball World Series Championship.

== Teams ==
Each team that competed in the tournament came out of one of the 10 regions.

Pool A	Pool B
Canada Region; Victoria, British Columbia; Hampton LL	Asia-Pacific Region; Bacolod, Philippines; Negros Occidental LL
East Region; Bear, Delaware; Canal American LL	Central Region; Floyds Knobs, Indiana; Floyds Knobs Community Club LL
Europe-Africa Region; Prague, Czech Republic; Northwest Czech Republic LL	Host District (Oregon District 4); Beaverton, Oregon; South Beaverton Girls LL
Southeast Region; Salisbury, North Carolina; Rowan LL	Latin America Region; Coamo, Puerto Rico; Softball Femenino de Coamo LL
West Region; Cedar City, Utah; Cedar City National LL	Southwest Region; Waco, Texas; Lake Air LL

== Results ==
Pool A
Rank	Region	Record
1	North Carolina	4–0
2	Delaware	3–1
3	Czech Republic	2–2
4	Utah	1–3
5	Canada	0–4

Pool B
Rank	Region	Record
1	Texas	4–0
2	Indiana	3–1
3	Oregon	2–2
4	Philippines	1–3
5	Puerto Rico	0–4

All times US EST.

Pool	Away	Score	Home	Score
August 9
A	Canada	0	Delaware	12
B	Texas	11	Oregon	1
B	Puerto Rico	0	Indiana	10
A	North Carolina	17	Utah	7
August 10
B	Texas	10	Puerto Rico	0
A	Canada	1	North Carolina	16
B	Philippines	0	Oregon	1
A	Delaware	8	Czech Republic	2
August 11
B	Philippines	3	Indiana	7
A	Utah	3	Czech Republic	5
A	Delaware	1	North Carolina	4
B	Puerto Rico	4	Oregon	11
August 12
A	Utah	4	Delaware	5
B	North Carolina	7	Oregon	1
A	Czech Republic	2	Canada	0
B	Philippines	0	Texas	9
August 13
A	North Carolina	10	Czech Republic	0
B	Puerto Rico	1	Philippines	2
B	Indiana	4	Texas	6
A	Utah	8	Canada	1
August 15
Consolation	Canada	11	Puerto Rico	0
August 16
Consolation	Utah	2	Philippines	1
Consolation	Oregon	2	Czech Republic	13

=== Elimination round ===
Quarterfinals
A2	Delaware	11
B3	Oregon	2
B1	Texas	7
A4	Utah	3
B2	Indiana	8
A3	Czech Republic	0
A1	North Carolina	11
B4	Philippines	1

Semifinals
A2	Delaware	3
B1	Texas	5
B2	Indiana	5
A1	North Carolina	6

Finals
B1	Texas	7
A1	North Carolina	2
Third place
A2	Delaware	6
B2	Indiana	6

2017 Little League Softball World Series Champions
Lake Air Little League
Waco, Texas
