= 1984 Little League Softball World Series =

Tournament details
- Dates: August 14–August 18
- Teams: 4

Final positions
- Champions: Albuquerque, New Mexico; Albuquerque Little League
- Runners-up: Indianapolis, Indiana; Fall Creek Little League

The 1984 Little League Softball World Series was held in Kalamazoo, Michigan from August 14 to August 18, 1984. Four teams, all from the United States, competed for the Little League Softball World Series Championship in a double-elimination tournament.

== Teams ==
Each team that competed in the tournament came out of one of four qualifying regions.

United States Regions
Central Region
Indianapolis, Indiana
Fall Creek Little League
East Region
Glasgow, Delaware
Canal Little League
South Region
King, North Carolina
King Little League
West Region
Albuquerque, New Mexico
Albuquerque Little League

== Results ==
Upper round 1
-	Delaware	4
–	New Mexico	5
–	Indiana	3
–	North Carolina	2
Lower round 1
0–1	Delaware	0
0–1	North Carolina	7

Upper final
1–0	Indiana	7
1–0	New Mexico	10
Lower final
1–1	Indiana	7
1–1	North Carolina	6

Championship
2–0	New Mexico	3	11
2–1	Indiana	17	3

1984 Little League Softball World Series Champions
Albuquerque Little League
Albuquerque, Illinois
