= 1993 Little League Softball World Series =

Tournament details
- Dates: August 16–August 21
- Teams: 6

Final positions
- Champions: Waco, Texas; Midway Little League
- Runners-up: (Washington (state)) Marysville, Washington; Marysville Little League

The 1993 Little League Softball World Series was held in Kalamazoo, Michigan from August 16 to August 21, 1993. Six teams, two international teams and four from the United States, competed for the Little League Softball World Series Championship in a double-elimination tournament.

== Teams ==
Each team that competed in the tournament came out of one of six qualifying regions.

United States Regions	International Regions
Central Region; Southport, Indiana; Southport Little League	Canada Region; Victoria, British Columbia; Layritz Little League
East Region (New York (state)) Islip, New York; Islip Little League	Europe Region; Prague, Czech Republic; Northwest Czech Republic Little League
South Region; Waco, Texas; Midway Little League	
West Region (Washington (state)) Marysville, Washington; Marysville Little League	

== Results ==
Upper round 1
–	Czech Republic	1
–	(Washington (state)) Washington	13
–	Texas	16
–	Canada	0
Lower round 1
0–1	(New York (state)) New York	16
0–1	Czech Republic	5
0–1	Indiana	7
0–1	Canada	5

Upper round 2
–	Indiana	1
1–0	(Washington (state)) Washington	12
–	(New York (state)) New York	2
1–0	Texas	3
Lower round 2
1–1	(New York (state)) New York	10
1–1	Indiana	2

Upper final
2–0	(Washington (state)) Washington	2
2–0	Texas	12
Lower final
2–1	(Washington (state)) Washington	4
2–1	(New York (state)) New York	3

Championship
3–0	Texas	10	–
3–1	(Washington (state)) Washington	1	–

1993 Little League Softball World Series Champions
Midway Little League
Waco, Texas
