= 1988 Little League Softball World Series =

Tournament details
- Dates: August 16–August 21
- Teams: 5

Final positions
- Champions: Naples, Florida; Greater Naples Little League
- Runners-up: Glendale, California; Foothill Little League

The 1988 Little League Softball World Series was held in Kalamazoo, Michigan from August 16 to August 21, 1988. Five teams, all from the United States, competed for the Little League Softball World Series Championship in a double-elimination tournament.

== Teams ==
Each team that competed in the tournament came out of one of five qualifying regions.

United States Regions
Central Region
Indianapolis, Indiana
Fall Creek Little League
East Region
Shippensburg, Pennsylvania
Shippensburg Area Little League
Host Region (Michigan)
Jenison, Michigan
Georgetown Little League
South Region
Naples, Florida
Greater Naples Little League
West Region
Glendale, California
Foothill Little League

== Results ==
Upper round 1
—	Florida	0
—	Indiana	2
Lower round 1
0–1	Michigan	3
0–1	Florida	6

Upper round 2
–	California	2
1–0	Indiana	1
—	Michigan	3
—	Pennsylvania	9
Lower round 2
1–1	Indiana	0
1–1	Florida	14

Upper final
1–0	California	6
1–0	Pennsylvania	4
Lower final
1–1	Pennsylvania	2
2–1	Florida	8

Championship
2–0	California	0	0
3–1	Florida	1	1

1988 Little League Softball World Series Champions
Greater Naples Little League
Naples, Florida
