= 2007 Little League Softball World Series =

Tournament details
- Dates: August 9–August 15
- Teams: 10

Final positions
- Champions: Morristown, Tennessee; Morristown American/National Little League
- Runners-up: Elgin, Texas; Elgin Little League

The 2007 Little League Softball World Series was held in Portland, Oregon from August 9 to August 15, 2007. Ten teams, four international teams and six from the United States, competed for the Little League Softball World Series Championship.

== Teams ==
Each team that competed in the tournament came out of one of ten qualifying regions.

Pool A	Pool B
Canada Region; Windsor, Ontario; Turtle Club Little League	Asia-Pacific Region; Makati City, Philippines; ILLAM Central Little League
East Region; Waterford, Connecticut; Waterford South Little League	Central Region; Gladstone, Michigan; Gladstone Area Little League
Host District (Oregon District 4); Beaverton, Oregon; Beaverton Area Little League	Europe-Middle East-Africa Region; Ramstein AFB, Germany; KMC American Little League
Latin America Region; Maunabo, Puerto Rico; ASOFEM Little League	South Region; Morristown, Tennessee; Morristown American/National Little League
Southwest Region; Elgin, Texas; Elgin Little League	West Region; Gilroy, California; Gilroy Little League

== Results ==
Pool A
Rank	Region	Record
1	Texas	4–0
2	Connecticut	3–1
3	Puerto Rico	2–2
4	Oregon	1–3
5	Canada	0–4

Pool B
Rank	Region	Record
1	Tennessee	4–0
2	Michigan	2–2
3	California	2–2
4	Philippines	2–2
5	Germany	0–4

Pool	Away	Score	Home	Score
August 9
A	Connecticut	3	Puerto Rico	0
B	California	1	Tennessee	4
B	Germany	0	Philippines	13
A	Texas	13	Oregon	3
August 10
B	Michigan	13	Germany	0
B	California	7	Philippines	3
A	Connecticut	11	Canada	10
A	Oregon	4	Puerto Rico	9
August 11
A	Texas	5	Connecticut	4
B	California	9	Germany	0
A	Canada	1	Puerto Rico	16
B	Michigan	0	Tennessee	2
August 12
A	Canada	0	Texas	15
B	Germany	0	Tennessee	18
A	Oregon	1	Connecticut	2
B	Michigan	0	Philippines	5
August 13
B	Tennessee	9	Philippines	3
A	Oregon	10	Canada	0
A	Texas	10	Puerto Rico	3
B	Michigan	6	California	1
August 15
9th Place	Canada	10	Germany	4
7th Place	Oregon	1	Philippines	3
5th Place	Puerto Rico	9	California	10

=== Elimination round ===
Semifinals
A1	Texas	6
B2	Michigan	1
B1	Tennessee	10
A2	Connecticut	1

Finals
A1	Texas	2
B1	Tennessee	3
Third place
B2	Michigan	5
A2	Connecticut	2

2007 Little League Softball World Series Champions
Morristown American/National Little League
Morristown, Tennessee
