= 2010 Little League Softball World Series =

Tournament details
- Dates: August 12–August 18
- Teams: 9

Final positions
- Champions: (Georgia (U.S. state)) Warner Robins, Georgia; Warner Robins American Little League
- Runners-up: Burbank, California; Burbank Little League

The 2010 Little League Softball World Series was held in Portland, Oregon from August 12 to August 18, 2010. Nine teams, three international teams and six from the United States, competed for the Little League Softball World Series Championship.

== Teams ==
Each team that competed in the tournament came out of one of nine qualifying regions.

Pool A	Pool B
East Region; Robbinsville, New Jersey; Robbinsville Little League	Canada Region; Victoria, British Columbia; Layritz Little League
Europe-Middle East-Africa Region; Wrocław, Poland; UKS Softball Club Little League	Central Region; Poland, Ohio; Poland Community Little League
Host District (Oregon District 4); Tigard, Oregon; Tigard Little League	Latin America Region; Maunabo, Puerto Rico; ASOFEM Little League
Southeast Region (Georgia (U.S. state)) Warner Robins, Georgia; Warner Robins American Little League	Southwest Region; Brenham, Texas; Washington County Little League
	West Region; Burbank, California; Burbank Little League

== Results ==
Pool A
Rank	Region	Record
1	(Georgia (U.S. state)) Georgia	3–0
2	Oregon	2–1
3	New Jersey	1–2
4	Poland	0–3

Pool B
Rank	Region	Record
1	California	3–1
2	Ohio	3–1
3	Texas	3–1
4	Puerto Rico	1–3
5	Canada	0–4

Pool	Away	Score	Home	Score
August 12
B	California	18	Puerto Rico	2
A	Oregon	0	(Georgia (U.S. state)) Georgia	5
B	Texas	4	Ohio	5
August 13
A	New Jersey	9	Poland	0
B	Ohio	7	Puerto Rico	4
B	California	11	Canada	2
August 14
B	Texas	3	California	0
A	Oregon	11	Poland	1
B	Canada	0	Puerto Rico	2
A	New Jersey	0	(Georgia (U.S. state)) Georgia	4
August 15
B	Canada	4	Texas	16
A	Poland	0	(Georgia (U.S. state)) Georgia	10
B	Ohio	0	California	1
August 16
B	Ohio	7	Canada	1
B	Texas	2	Puerto Rico	1
A	New Jersey	0	Oregon	1
August 18
7th Place	Poland	0	Puerto Rico	10
5th Place	New Jersey	4	Texas	0

=== Elimination round ===
Semifinals
A1	(Georgia (U.S. state)) Georgia	1
B2	Ohio	0
B1	California	10
A2	Oregon	0

Finals
A1	(Georgia (U.S. state)) Georgia	8
B1	California	6
Third place
B2	Ohio	4
A2	Oregon	5

2010 Little League Softball World Series Champions
Warner Robins American Little League
Warner Robins, Georgia
