= 2014 Little League Softball World Series =

Tournament details
- Dates: August 6–August 13
- Teams: 10

Final positions
- Champions: Robbinsville, New Jersey; Robbinsville Little League
- Runners-up: Louisiana; Bossier Little League

The 2014 Little League Softball World Series was held in Portland, Oregon from August 3 to August 13, 2014. Six teams from the United States and four from throughout the world competed for the Little League Softball World Champions.

== Teams ==
Each team that competes in the tournament will come out of one of the 10 regions.

United States	International
Tallmadge, Ohio; Central Region; Tallmadge LL	Iloilo, Philippines; Asia-Pacific; Iloilo LL
Robbinsville, New Jersey; East Region; Robbinsville LL	Victoria, British Columbia; Canada; Hampton LL
(Georgia (U.S. state)) Columbus, Georgia; Southeast Region; Pioneer LL	Prague, Czech Republic; Europe & Africa; Prague LL
Bossier City, Louisiana; Southwest Region; Bossier LL	Maunabo, Puerto Rico; Latin America; ASOFEM LL
Chico, California; West Region; Chico Softball Black LL	Only 4 International Teams
Tigard/Tualatin, Oregon; Oregon District 4 Tigard/Tualatin City LL	Only 4 International Teams

== Results ==
Pool A
Rank	Region	Record	Runs Allowed	Defensive Innings	Run Ratio
1	(Georgia (U.S. state)) Georgia	4–0	7	20	0.350
2	Ohio	3–1	9	23	0.391
3	Oregon D4	2–2	27	22	1.227
4	Puerto Rico	1–3	8	21	0.380
5	Czech Republic	0–4	37	19	1.947

Pool B
Rank	Region	Record	Runs Allowed	Defensive Innings	Run Ratio
1	New Jersey	4–0	2	20	0.100
2	Louisiana	3–1	19	22	0.864
3	Canada	2–2	13	22	0.590
4	California	1–3	24	22	1.091
5	Philippines	0–4	25	22	1.136

All times US PST.

Pool	Away	Score	Home	Score	Time
August 7
A	Oregon D4	1	Ohio	10	10:00am
B	Canada	0	New Jersey	3	1:00pm
B	California	6	Philippines	0	4:00pm
A	Puerto Rico	7	Czech Republic	1	7:00pm
August 8
B	Philippines	0	New Jersey	6	10:00am
A	Ohio	9	Czech Republic	1	12:30pm
B	Canada	1	Louisiana	8	4:00pm
A	(Georgia (U.S. state)) Georgia	11 (F/4)	Oregon D4	0	7:00pm
August 9
B	Louisiana	5	California	4	10:00am
A	Puerto Rico	0	(Georgia (U.S. state)) Georgia	1	1:00pm
A	Czech Republic	5	Oregon D4	7	4:00pm
B	Philippines	1	Canada	11 (F/5)	7:00pm
August 10
A	Puerto Rico	1	Oregon D4	2	10:00am
B	California	1	Canada	8	12:30pm
A	Ohio	3	(Georgia (U.S. state)) Georgia	6	5:00pm
B	New Jersey	12 (F/4)	Louisiana	1	7:30pm
August 11
A	Czech Republic	4	(Georgia (U.S. state)) Georgia	14 (F/4)	10:00am
B	Philippines	2	Louisiana	4	1:00pm
B	New Jersey	11 (F/5)	California	1	4:00pm
A	Puerto Rico	1	Ohio	4	7:00pm
August 12
9th	A5 Czech Republic	7	B5 Philippines	4	9:30am
August 13
7th	A4 Puerto Rico	11	B4 California	2	9:00am
5th	A3 Oregon D4	1	B4 Canada	9	11:00am

=== Elimination round ===
Semifinals
A1	(Georgia (U.S. state)) Georgia	1
B2	Louisiana	2
B1	New Jersey	11 (F/5)
A2	Ohio	1

Finals
WSF1	Louisiana	1
WSF2	New Jersey	4
Third place
LSF1	(Georgia (U.S. state)) Georgia	6
LSF2	Ohio	4

2014 Little League Softball World Series Champions
Robbinsville Little League
Robbinsville, New Jersey
