= 1978 Little League Softball World Series =

Tournament details
- Dates: August 16–August 17
- Teams: 4

Final positions
- Champions: Shippensburg, Pennsylvania; Shippensburg Little League
- Runners-up: Boone, Iowa; Boone National Little League

The 1978 Little League Softball World Series was held in Baxter Springs, Kansas from August 16 to August 17, 1978. Four teams, all from the United States, competed for the Little League Softball World Series Championship in a single-elimination tournament.

== Teams ==
Each team that competed in the tournament came out of one of four qualifying regions.

United States Regions
Central Region
Boone, Iowa
Boone National Little League
East Region
Shippensburg, Pennsylvania
Shippensburg Little League
South Region
Salem, Virginia
Salem Little League
West Region
Glendale, California
Glendale Little League

== Results ==
Semifinals
Iowa	5
California	4
Virginia	3
Pennsylvania	5

Championship
Iowa	3
Pennsylvania	8
Third Place Game
Virginia	1
California	10

1978 Little League Softball World Series Champions
Shippensburg Little League
Shippensburg, Pennsylvania
