= 2002 Little League Softball World Series =

Tournament details
- Dates: August 7–August 14
- Teams: 10

Final positions
- Champions: Waco, Texas; Midway Little League
- Runners-up: Beaverton, Oregon; Beaverton Area Little League

The 2002 Little League Softball World Series was held in Portland, Oregon from August 7 to August 14, 2002. Ten teams, four international teams and six from the United States, competed for the Little League Softball World Series Championship.

This is the first softball World Series to involve ten participants, with the South Region splitting into the Southeast and Southwest regions, and the addition of the Host Region (Oregon District 4).

== Teams ==
Each team that competed in the tournament came out of one of ten qualifying regions.

Pool A	Pool B
Canada Region; Windsor, Ontario; Windsor South Canadian Little League	Asia-Pacific Region; Bacolod, Philippines; DepEd Bacolod City Little League
East Region; Warrington, Pennsylvania; Warrington Warwick Little League	Central Region; South Bend, Indiana; East Side Little League
Host District (Oregon District 4); Beaverton, Oregon; Beaverton Area Little League	Europe Region; Utrecht, Netherlands; Utrecht/Hague Little League
Latin America Region; Maunabo, Puerto Rico; Rosario Y. Cardona Little League	South Region (Georgia (U.S. state)) Warner Robins, Georgia; Warner Robins Little League
Southwest Region; Waco, Texas; Midway Little League	West Region; Tucson, Arizona; San Xavier Little League

== Results ==
Pool A
Rank	Region	Record
1	Oregon	4–0
2	Texas	3–1
3	Pennsylvania	2–2
4	Canada	1–3
5	Puerto Rico	0–4

Pool B
Rank	Region	Record
1	Indiana	3–1
2	(Georgia (U.S. state)) Georgia	3–1
3	Philippines	3–1
4	Arizona	1–3
5	Netherlands	0–4

Pool	Away	Score	Home	Score
August 7
A	Texas	16	Pennsylvania	5
B	Netherlands	6	Philippines	9
A	Canada	7	Puerto Rico	3
B	Arizona	5	Indiana	6
August 8
A	Oregon	1	Texas	0
B	Indiana	11	Netherlands	6
A	Pennsylvania	2	Canada	0
B	(Georgia (U.S. state)) Georgia	10	Arizona	5
August 9
A	Pennsylvania	0	Oregon	6
B	Indiana	17	(Georgia (U.S. state)) Georgia	1
A	Puerto Rico	3	Texas	10
B	Philippines	8	Arizona	1
August 10
A	Puerto Rico	0	Oregon	11
B	Arizona	10	Netherlands	1
A	Texas	13	Canada	3
B	Philippines	8	(Georgia (U.S. state)) Georgia	9
August 11
A	Canada	4	Oregon	15
B	Netherlands	1	(Georgia (U.S. state)) Georgia	21
A	Pennsylvania	11	Puerto Rico	3
B	Indiana	4	Philippines	6
August 13
9th Place	Puerto Rico	0	Netherlands	14
7th Place	Canada	4	Arizona	15
5th Place	Pennsylvania	3	Philippines	1

=== Elimination round ===
Semifinals
A1	Oregon	4
B2	(Georgia (U.S. state)) Georgia	3
B1	Indiana	1
A2	Texas	8

Finals
A1	Oregon	1
A2	Texas	6
Third place
B2	(Georgia (U.S. state)) Georgia	4
B1	Indiana	3

2002 Little League Softball World Series Champions
Midway Little League
Waco, Texas
