= 2008 Little League Softball World Series =

Tournament details
- Dates: August 7–August 13
- Teams: 10

Final positions
- Champions: Simpsonville, South Carolina; Simpsonville Little League
- Runners-up: Robbinsville, New Jersey; Robbinsville Little League

The 2008 Little League Softball World Series was held in Portland, Oregon from August 7 to August 13, 2008. Ten teams, four international teams and six from the United States, competed for the Little League Softball World Series Championship.

== Teams ==
Each team that competed in the tournament came out of one of ten qualifying regions.

Pool A	Pool B
Canada Region; Windsor, Ontario; Turtle Club Little League	Asia-Pacific Region; Bacolod, Philippines; Bacolod West Little League
East Region; Robbinsville, New Jersey; Robbinsville Little League	Central Region; Sterling, Illinois; Sterling Little League
Host District (Oregon District 4); Beaverton, Oregon; Beaverton Area Little League	Europe-Middle East-Africa Region; Milan, Italy; Lombardia Little League
Latin America Region; Maunabo, Puerto Rico; ASOFEM Little League	South Region; Simpsonville, South Carolina; Simpsonville Little League
Southwest Region; Waco, Texas; Midway Little League	West Region; Grand Terrace, California; Grand Terrace Little League

== Results ==
Pool A
Rank	Region	Record
1	New Jersey	4–0
2	Puerto Rico	3–1
3	Texas	2–2
4	Oregon	1–3
5	Canada	0–4

Pool B
Rank	Region	Record
1	South Carolina	4–0
2	Illinois	3–1
3	California	2–2
4	Philippines	1–3
5	Italy	0–4

Pool	Away	Score	Home	Score
August 7
A	New Jersey	4	Puerto Rico	2
B	California	0	South Carolina	1
B	Italy	4	Philippines	5
A	Texas	2	Oregon	1
August 8
B	Illinois	9	Italy	1
B	California	3	Philippines	0
A	New Jersey	10	Canada	0
A	Oregon	1	Puerto Rico	7
August 9
A	Texas	2	New Jersey	3
B	California	16	Italy	0
A	Canada	0	Puerto Rico	16
B	Illinois	5	South Carolina	6
August 10
A	Canada	0	Texas	10
B	Italy	0	South Carolina	12
A	Oregon	0	New Jersey	6
B	Illinois	8	Philippines	0
August 11
B	South Carolina	10	Philippines	2
A	Oregon	11	Canada	1
A	Texas	4	Puerto Rico	5
B	Illinois	5	California	0
August 13
9th Place	Canada	1	Italy	12
7th Place	Oregon	11	Philippines	0
5th Place	Texas	2	California	3

=== Elimination round ===
Semifinals
A1	New Jersey	1
B2	Illinois	0
B1	South Carolina	7
A2	Puerto Rico	6

Finals
A1	New Jersey	5
B1	South Carolina	9
Third place
B2	Illinois	3
A2	Puerto Rico	2

2008 Little League Softball World Series Champions
Simpsonville Little League
Simpsonville, South Carolina
