= 1996 Little League Softball World Series =

Tournament details
- Dates: August 11–August 17
- Teams: 8

Final positions
- Champions: Clearwater, Florida; Countryside Little League
- Runners-up: Pampanga, Philippines; Pampanga Little League

The 1996 Little League Softball World Series was held in Portland, Oregon from August 11 to August 17, 1996. Eight teams, four international teams and four from the United States, competed for the Little League Softball World Series Championship in a double-elimination tournament.

== Teams ==
Each team that competed in the tournament came out of one of eight qualifying regions.

United States Regions	International Regions
Central Region; Boone, Iowa; Boone National Little League	Canada Region; Surrey, British Columbia; Kennedy-Surrey Little League
East Region; Pennsville, New Jersey; Pennsville Little League	Europe Region; Brzeg, Poland; Brzeg Little League
South Region; Clearwater, Florida; Countryside Little League	Far East Region; Pampanga, Philippines; Pampanga Little League
West Region; Manteca, California; Northgate Little League	Latin America Region; Mexico City, Mexico; Liga Olmeca Little League

== Results ==
Upper round 1	Upper round 2	Upper final	Championship
—	Florida	10
—	New Jersey	0
1–0	Florida	7
1–0	Philippines	4
—	Philippines	16
—	Canada	1
2–0	Florida	3
2–0	California	2
—	Iowa	3
—	California	10
1–0	California	15
1–0	Mexico	2
—	Poland
—	Mexico*	3–0	Florida	4	4
4–1	Philippines	6	0
Lower round 1	Lower round 2	Lower round 3	Lower final
1–1	Mexico	5
0–1	New Jersey	5	1–1	New Jersey	29	3–1	Philippines	4
0–1	Canada	2	2–1	New Jersey	2–1	California	0
2–1	Philippines*
1–1	Philippines	4
0–1	Iowa*	1–1	Iowa	2
0–1	Poland

- Final score not recorded in available sources

1996 Little League Softball World Series Champions
Countryside Little League
Clearwater, Florida
