= 1989 Little League Softball World Series =

Tournament details
- Dates: August 15–August 19
- Teams: 4

Final positions
- Champions: Naples, Florida; Greater Naples Little League
- Runners-up: (Washington (state)) Marysville, Washington; Marysville Little League

The 1989 Little League Softball World Series was held in Kalamazoo, Michigan from August 15 to August 19, 1989. Four teams, all from the United States, competed for the Little League Softball World Series Championship in a double-elimination tournament.

== Teams ==
Each team that competed in the tournament came out of one of four qualifying regions.

United States Regions
Central Region
Tallmadge, Ohio
Tallmadge Little League
East Region
Shippensburg, Pennsylvania
Shippensburg Area Little League
South Region
Naples, Florida
Greater Naples Little League
West Region
(Washington (state)) Marysville, Washington
Marysville Little League

== Results ==
Upper round 1
-	(Washington (state)) Washington	2
–	Pennsylvania	1
–	Florida	9
–	Ohio	1
Lower round 1
0–1	Pennsylvania	6
0–1	Ohio	3

Upper final
1–0	Florida	3
1–0	(Washington (state)) Washington	1
Lower final
1–1	(Washington (state)) Washington	3
1–1	Pennsylvania	1

Championship
2–0	Florida	5	–
2–1	(Washington (state)) Washington	0	–

1989 Little League Softball World Series Champions
Greater Naples Little League
Naples, Florida
