= 1998 Little League Softball World Series =

Tournament details
- Dates: August 16–August 22
- Teams: 8

Final positions
- Champions: Waco, Texas; Midway Little League
- Runners-up: Beaverton, Oregon; Murrayhill Little League

The 1998 Little League Softball World Series was held in Portland, Oregon from August 16 to August 22, 1998. Eight teams, four international teams and four from the United States, competed for the Little League Softball World Series Championship in a double-elimination tournament.

== Teams ==
Each team that competed in the tournament came out of one of eight qualifying regions.

United States Regions	International Regions
Central Region; West Portsmouth, Ohio; West Portsmouth Little League	Canada Region; Victoria, British Columbia; Layritz Little League
East Region; Pennsville, New Jersey; Pennsville Little League	Europe Region; Brzeg, Poland; Brzeg Little League
South Region; Waco, Texas; Midway Little League	Far East Region; Bacolod, Philippines; Bacolod City Little League
West Region; Beaverton, Oregon; Murrayhill Little League	Latin America Region; Mexico City, Mexico; Liga Olmeca Little League

== Results ==
Upper round 1	Upper round 2	Upper final	Championship
—	Mexico	4
—	Canada	7
1–0	Canada	0
1–0	Philippines	1
—	Philippines	16
—	Poland	0
2–0	Philippines	0
2–0	Texas	4
—	Texas	14
—	New Jersey	7
1–0	Texas	5
1–0	Oregon	0
—	Oregon	2
—	Ohio	0	3–0	Texas	2	–
4–1	Oregon	0	–
Lower round 1	Lower round 2	Lower round 3	Lower final
1–1	Mexico	3
0–1	Mexico	33	1–1	Oregon	5	3–1	Oregon	8
0–1	Poland	0	2–1	Oregon	6	2–1	Philippines	3
2–1	Ohio	1
1–1	Ohio	4
0–1	New Jersey	2	1–1	Canada	1
0–1	Ohio	8

=== Consolation Bracket ===
Quarterfinals
New Jersey	8
Mexico	7
Poland	3
Canada	14

Semifinals
Ohio	6
New Jersey	2
Philippines	2
Canada	1

Final
Ohio	0
Philippines	2

1998 Little League Softball World Series Champions
Midway Little League
Waco, Texas
