= 2009 Little League Softball World Series =

Tournament details
- Dates: August 13–August 19
- Teams: 10

Final positions
- Champions: (Georgia (U.S. state)) Warner Robins, Georgia; Warner Robins American Little League
- Runners-up: Crawford, Texas; Crawford Little League

The 2009 Little League Softball World Series was held in Portland, Oregon from August 13 to August 19, 2009. Ten teams, four international teams and six from the United States, competed for the Little League Softball World Series Championship.

== Teams ==
Each team that competed in the tournament came out of one of ten qualifying regions.

Pool A	Pool B
Canada Region; Windsor, Ontario; Windsor South Little League	Asia-Pacific Region; Hagåtña, Guam; Guam Little League
East Region; Greensburg, Pennsylvania; West Point Little League	Central Region; Croswell, Michigan; Croswell Lexington Little League
Host District (Oregon District 4); Beaverton, Oregon; Beaverton Area Little League	Europe-Middle East-Africa Region; Milan, Italy; Lombardia Little League
Latin America Region; Willemstad, Curaçao; Soraida Juliana Little League	Southeast Region (Georgia (U.S. state)) Warner Robins, Georgia; Warner Robins American Little League
Southwest Region; Crawford, Texas; Crawford Little League	West Region; Anchorage, Alaska; Nunaka Valley Little League

== Results ==
Pool A
Rank	Region	Record
1	Texas	4–0
2	Pennsylvania	3–1
3	Oregon	2–2
4	Curaçao	1–3
5	Canada	0–4

Pool B
Rank	Region	Record
1	(Georgia (U.S. state)) Georgia	4–0
2	Michigan	3–1
3	Italy	2–2
4	Alaska	1–3
5	Guam	0–4

Pool	Away	Score	Home	Score
August 13
A	Pennsylvania	2	Curaçao	0
B	Alaska	2	(Georgia (U.S. state)) Georgia	7
B	Italy	9	Guam	2
A	Texas	4	Oregon	3
August 14
B	Michigan	10	Italy	0
B	Alaska	10	Guam	0
A	Pennsylvania	10	Canada	0
A	Oregon	4	Curaçao	3
August 15
A	Texas	4	Pennsylvania	1
B	Alaska	4	Italy	7
A	Canada	6	Curaçao	9
B	Michigan	4	(Georgia (U.S. state)) Georgia	5
August 16
A	Canada	0	Texas	10
B	Italy	1	(Georgia (U.S. state)) Georgia	4
A	Oregon	1	Pennsylvania	2
B	Michigan	10	Guam	0
August 17
B	(Georgia (U.S. state)) Georgia	13	Guam	0
A	Oregon	4	Canada	1
A	Texas	4	Curaçao	0
B	Michigan	3	Alaska	2
August 19
9th Place	Canada	3	Guam	8
7th Place	Curaçao	5	Alaska	2
5th Place	Oregon	4	Italy	5

=== Elimination round ===
Semifinals
A1	Texas	6
B2	Michigan	1
B1	(Georgia (U.S. state)) Georgia	6
A2	Pennsylvania	0

Finals
A1	Texas	2
B1	(Georgia (U.S. state)) Georgia	14
Third place
B2	Michigan	4
A2	Pennsylvania	0

2009 Little League Softball World Series Champions
Warner Robins American Little League
Warner Robins, Georgia
