= 1987 Little League Softball World Series =

Tournament details
- Dates: August 17–August 22
- Teams: 5

Final positions
- Champions: Tampa, Florida; Tampa Bay Little League
- Runners-up: Tallmadge, Ohio; Tallmadge Little League

The 1987 Little League Softball World Series was held in Kalamazoo, Michigan from August 17 to August 22, 1987. Five teams, all from the United States, competed for the Little League Softball World Series Championship in a double-elimination tournament.

== Teams ==
Each team that competed in the tournament came out of one of five qualifying regions.

United States Regions
Central Region
Tallmadge, Ohio
Tallmadge Little League
East Region
East Lyme, Connecticut
East Lyme Little League
Host Region (Michigan)
Essexville, Michigan
Essexville-Hampton Little League
South Region
Tampa, Florida
Tampa Bay Little League
West Region
Tucson, Arizona
Tucson Mountain Little League

== Results ==
Upper round 1
—	Connecticut	1
—	Arizona	9
Lower round 1
0–1	(Florida) Florida	16
0–1	Connecticut	4

Upper round 2
–	Ohio	4
1–0	Arizona	0
—	Florida	0
—	Michigan	5
Lower round 2
1–1	Arizona	1
1–1	Florida	2

Upper final
1–0	Ohio	7
1–0	Michigan	2
Lower final
1–1	Michigan	0
2–1	Florida	7

Championship
2–0	Ohio	2	0
3–1	Florida	3	7

1987 Little League Softball World Series Champions
Tampa Bay Little League
Tampa, Florida
