= 2000 Little League Softball World Series =

Girls' softball competition

Tournament details
- Dates: August 13–August 19
- Teams: 8

Final positions
- Champions: Waco, Texas Midway Little League
- Runners-up: Tualatin, Oregon Tualatin Little League

The 2000 Little League Softball World Series was held in Portland, Oregon from August 13 to August 19, 2000. Four teams from the United States and four from throughout the world competed for the Little League Softball World Championship.

== Teams ==
Each team that competed in the tournament came out of one of eight qualifying regions.

United States	International
(Ohio) Tallmadge, Ohio; Central; Tallmadge LL	(Canada) (Alberta) Calgary; Canada; Calgary LL
(New York (state)) Brewster, New York; East; Brewster LL	(Germany) Spangdahlem, Germany; Europe; Spangdahlem LL
(Texas) Waco, Texas; South; Midway LL	(Philippines) Bacolod, Philippines; Far East; DepEd Bacolod City LL
(Oregon) Tualatin, Oregon; West; Tualatin LL	(Puerto Rico) Maunabo, Puerto Rico; Latin America; Rosario Y Cardona LL

== Bracket ==
See footnote.

Upper round 1	Upper round 2	Upper final	Final
–	(New York (state)) East	1
–	(Texas) South	6
1–0	(Texas) South	12
1–0	(Philippines) Far East	2
–	(Philippines) Far East	11
–	(Puerto Rico) Latin America	1
2–0	(Texas) South	5
2–0	(Oregon) West	1
–	(Germany) Europe	1
–	Canada	17
1–0	Canada	0
1–0	(Oregon) West	12
–	(Ohio) Central	2
–	(Oregon) West	12	3–0	(Texas) South	6	–
3–1	(Oregon) West	1	–
Lower round 1	Lower round 2	Lower round 3	Lower final
1–1	(Ohio) Central	2
0–1	(Germany) Europe	0	1–1	(Philippines) Far East	4	3–1	(Philippines) Far East	6
0–1	(Ohio) Central	21	2–1	(Philippines) Far East	6	2–1	(Oregon) West	7
2–1	(New York (state)) East	2
1–1	(New York (state)) East	19
0–1	(New York (state)) East	16	1–1	Canada	2
0–1	(Puerto Rico) Latin America	10

== Consolation ==
7th-8th Place
1–2	(Ohio) Central	12
0–2	(Puerto Rico) Latin America	1
0–2	(Germany) Europe	2
1–2	Canada	15

5th-6th Place
3–2	(Philippines) Far East	14
2–2	(Ohio) Central	2
3–2	(New York (state)) East	16
2–2	Canada	4

3rd Place
4–2	(Philippines) Far East	9
4–2	(New York (state)) East	1

== Final standings ==
Rank	Team	LL Organization	Record
1	(Texas) South	Midway LL	4–0
2	(Oregon) West	Tualatin LL	3–2
3	(Philippines) Far East	DepED Bacolod City LL	5–2
4	(New York (state)) East	Brewster LL	3–3
5	Canada	Calgary LL	2–3
5	(Ohio) Central	Tallmadge LL	2–3
7	(Germany) Europe	Spangdahlem LL	0–3
7	(Puerto Rico) Latin America	Rosario Y Cardona LL	0–3

2000 Little League Softball World Series Champions
Midway Little League
Waco, Texas
