= 1980 Little League Softball World Series =

Tournament details
- Dates: August 19–August 23
- Teams: 4

Final positions
- Champions: Glendale, California; Glendale Little League
- Runners-up: Seymour, Connecticut; George J. Hummel Little League

The 1980 Little League Softball World Series was held in Kalamazoo, Michigan from August 19 to August 23, 1980. Four teams, all from the United States, competed for the Little League Softball World Series Championship in a single-elimination tournament.

== Teams ==
Each team that competed in the tournament came out of one of four qualifying regions.

United States Regions
Central Region
Chicago, Illinois
Mt. Greenwood Park Little League
East Region
Seymour, Connecticut
George J. Hummel Little League
South Region
King, North Carolina
King Little League
West Region
Glendale, California
Glendale Little League

== Results ==
Semifinals
North Carolina	4
California	11
Connecticut	1
Illinois	0

Championship
California	9
Connecticut	4
Third Place Game
North Carolina	5
Illinois	9

1980 Little League Softball World Series Champions
Glendale Little League
Glendale, California
