= 1975 Little League Softball World Series =

Tournament details
- Dates: August 20–August 22
- Teams: 4

Final positions
- Champions: Medford, Oregon; Medford Little League
- Runners-up: (New York (state)) Dix Hills, New York; Half Hollow Hills Little League

The 1975 Little League Softball World Series was held at Lamade Stadium in Williamsport, Pennsylvania from August 20 to August 22, 1975. Four teams, all from the United States, competed for the Little League Softball World Series Championship in a single-elimination tournament.

== Teams ==
Each team that competed in the tournament came out of one of four qualifying regions.

United States Regions
Central Region
Sturgeon Bay, Wisconsin
Sturgeon Bay Little League
East Region
(New York (state)) Dix Hills, New York
Half Hollow Hills Little League
South Region
Tampa, Florida
Wellswood Little League
West Region
Medford, Oregon
Medford Little League

== Results ==
Semifinals
Florida | 2
Oregon | 3
(New York (state)) New York | 3
Wisconsin | 1

Championship
Oregon | 1
(New York (state)) New York | 0
Third Place Game
Florida | 3
Wisconsin | 2

1975 Little League Softball World Series Champions
Medford Little League
Medford, Oregon
