= 2012 Little League Softball World Series =

Youth softball competition

Tournament details
- Dates: August 9–August 15
- Teams: 10

Final positions
- Champions: Albuquerque, New Mexico; Eastdale Little League
- Runners-up: Windermere, Florida; McLean Little League

The 2012 Little League Softball World Series was held in Portland, Oregon from August 8 to August 14, 2012. Six teams from the United States and four from throughout the world competed for the Little League Softball World Champions.

== Teams ==
Each team that competes in the tournament will come out of one of the 10 regions.

United States	International
Anderson, Indiana; Central Region; Riverfield LL	Makati City, Philippines; Asia Pacific; ILLAM Central LL
(New York (state)) New Hyde Park, New York; East Region; New Hyde Park LL	Windsor, Ontario; Canada; Turtle Club LL
Windermere, Florida; Southeast Region; Windermere Softball LL	Utrecht, Netherlands; Europe and Africa; Midden-Nederland LL
Albuquerque, New Mexico; Southwest Region; Eastdale LL	Mexicali, Mexico; Latin America; Softbol Femenil Mexicali LL
Kapolei, Hawaii; West Region; Makakilo Kapolei Honokai Hale LL	Only 4 International Teams
Beaverton, Oregon; Oregon District 4 Raleigh Hills LL	Only 4 International Teams

== Standings ==
Pool A
Rank	Region	Record
1	(Florida) Southeast	3-1
2	(Indiana) Central	3-1
3	(Mexico) Latin America	3-1
4	(Netherlands) Europe and Africa	1-3
5	Oregon D4	0-4

Pool B
Rank	Region	Record
1	(New Mexico) Southwest	4-0
2	(Hawaii) West	3-1
3	(New York (state)) East	2-2
4	(Philippines) Asia Pacific	1-3
5	Canada	0-4

== Results ==
Pool	Away	Score	Home	Score	Time
August 9
A	(Indiana) Central	1	Oregon D4	0	10:00
B	(New York (state)) East	11	(Philippines) Asia Pacific	4	1:00
B	Canada	0	(Hawaii) West	14 (F/4)	4:00
A	(Netherlands) Europe and Africa	1	(Mexico) Latin America	11	7:00
August 10
B	(New York (state)) East	16 (F/4)	Canada	0	10:00
A	(Indiana) Central	13 (F/4)	(Netherlands) Europe and Africa	1	12:30
B	(New Mexico) Southwest	10	(Philippines) Asia Pacific	0	4:00
A	(Florida) Southeast	9	Oregon D4	0	7:00
August 11
B	(New Mexico) Southwest	4	(Hawaii) West	0	10:00
A	(Florida) Southeast	5	(Mexico) Latin America	7	1:00
A	Oregon D4	6	(Netherlands) Europe and Africa	7	4:00
B	(Philippines) Asia Pacific	19 (F/4)	Canada	7	7:00
August 12
A	Oregon D4	0	(Mexico) Latin America	5	10:00
B	(Philippines) Asia Pacific	9	(Hawaii) West	10	12:30
A	(Indiana) Central	2	(Florida) Southeast	9	5:00
B	(New Mexico) Southwest	9	(New York (state)) East	3	7:30
August 13
A	(Netherlands) Europe and Africa	0	(Florida) Southeast	12 (F/4)	10:00
B	(New Mexico) Southwest	16	Canada	0	1:00
B	(Hawaii) West	6	(New York (state)) East	1	4:00
A	(Indiana) Central	12	(Mexico) Latin America	2	7:00
August 14
9th	A5 Oregon D4	10 (F/5)	B5 Canada	6	9:00
August 15
7th	A4 (Netherlands) Europe and Africa	5	B4 (Philippines) Asia Pacific	6	9:00
5th	A3 (Mexico) Latin America	6	B3 (New York (state)) East	7	11:30

=== Elimination round ===
Semifinals
A1	Windermere, Florida	1
B2	Kapolei, Hawaii	0
B1	Albuquerque, New Mexico	12
A2	Anderson, Indiana	1

Finals
WSF1	Windermere, Florida	1
WSF2	Albuquerque, New Mexico	16 (F/5)
Third place
LSF1	Anderson, Indiana	2
LSF2	Kapolei, Hawaii	6

2012 Little League Softball World Series Champions
Eastdale Little League
Albuquerque, New Mexico
