= 1997 Little League Softball World Series =

Tournament details
- Dates: August 10–August 16
- Teams: 8

Final positions
- Champions: Waco, Texas; Midway Little League
- Runners-up: Warrington, Pennsylvania; Warrington Warwick Little League

The 1997 Little League Softball World Series was held in Portland, Oregon from August 10 to August 16, 1997. Eight teams, four international teams and four from the United States, competed for the Little League Softball World Series Championship in a double-elimination tournament.

== Teams ==
Each team that competed in the tournament came out of one of eight qualifying regions.

United States Regions	International Regions
Central Region; Brookfield, Illinois; Brookfield National Little League	Canada Region; Windsor, Ontario; Windsor South Little League
East Region; Warrington, Pennsylvania; Warrington Warwick Little League	Europe Region; Stuttgart, Germany; EURCOM Community Little League
South Region; Waco, Texas; Midway Little League	Far East Region; Pampanga, Philippines; Pampanga Little League
West Region; La Crescenta, California; Crescenta Valley Little League	Latin America Region; Mexico City, Mexico; Liga Olmeca Little League

== Results ==
Upper round 1	Upper round 2	Upper final	Championship
—	Pennsylvania	2
—	California	3
1–0	California	0
1–0	Texas	4
—	Texas	12
—	Illinois	0
2–0	Texas	2
2–0	Philippines	0
—	Germany	4
—	Mexico	13
1–0	Mexico	1
1–0	Philippines	8
—	Philippines	9
—	Canada	0	3–0	Texas	3	6
4–1	Pennsylvania	4	0
Lower round 1	Lower round 2	Lower round 3	Lower final
1–1	Mexico	1
0–1	Pennsylvania	8	1–1	Pennsylvania	16	3–1	Pennsylvania	16
0–1	Illinois	7	2–1	Pennsylvania	6	2–1	Philippines	11
2–1	California	5
1–1	California	11
0–1	Germany	2	1–1	Canada	1
0–1	Canada	22

=== Consolation Bracket ===
Quarterfinals
Germany	2
Mexico	10
Illinois	12
Canada	2

Semifinals
California	10
Mexico	0
Philippines	6
Illinois	2

Final
California	2
Philippines	0

1997 Little League Softball World Series Champions
Midway Little League
Waco, Texas
