= 1977 Little League Softball World Series =

Tournament details
- Dates: August 17–August 21
- Teams: 4

Final positions
- Champions: Salinas, California; American Little League
- Runners-up: Robertsdale, Alabama; Robertsdale Little League

The 1977 Little League Softball World Series was held in Portland, Oregon from August 17 to August 21, 1977. Four teams, all from the United States, competed for the Little League Softball World Series Championship in a single-elimination tournament.

== Teams ==
Each team that competed in the tournament came out of one of four qualifying regions.

United States Regions
Central Region
Mount Pleasant, Michigan
Mount Pleasant Girls Softball Little League
East Region
Somerset, Massachusetts
Somerset Little League
South Region
Robertsdale, Alabama
Robertsdale Little League
West Region
Salinas, California
American Little League

== Results ==
Semifinals
Alabama | 6
Massachusetts | 3
California | 14
Michigan | 0

Championship
Alabama | 3
California | 4
Third Place Game
Massachusetts | 6
Michigan | 3

1977 Little League Softball World Series Champions
American Little League
Salinas, California
