= 1981 Little League Softball World Series =

Tournament details
- Dates: August 18–August 22
- Teams: 4

Final positions
- Champions: Gresham, Oregon; Gresham Little League
- Runners-up: Tallmadge, Ohio; Tallmadge Little League

The 1981 Little League Softball World Series was held in Kalamazoo, Michigan from August 18 to August 22, 1981. Four teams, all from the United States, competed for the Little League Softball World Series Championship in a single-elimination tournament.

== Teams ==
Each team that competed in the tournament came out of one of four qualifying regions.

United States Regions
Central Region
Tallmadge, Ohio
Tallmadge Little League
East Region
North Providence, Rhode Island
North Providence West Little League
South Region
Tampa, Florida
Tampa Bay Little League
West Region
Gresham, Oregon
Gresham Little League

== Results ==
Semifinals
Florida	2
Ohio	9
Rhode Island	1
Oregon	2

Championship
Ohio	3
Oregon	8
Third Place Game
Florida	9
Rhode Island	5

1981 Little League Softball World Series Champions
Gresham Little League
Gresham, Oregon
