= 1979 Little League Softball World Series =

Tournament details
- Dates: August 14–August 15
- Teams: 4

Final positions
- Champions: North Providence, Rhode Island; North Providence West Little League
- Runners-up: Orlando, Florida; Pine Castle Little League

The 1979 Little League Softball World Series was held in Waco, Texas from August 14 to August 15, 1979. Four teams, all from the United States, competed for the Little League Softball World Series Championship in a single-elimination tournament.

== Teams ==
Each team that competed in the tournament came out of one of four qualifying regions.

United States Regions
Central Region
Bartlesville, Oklahoma
Bartlesville Little League
East Region
North Providence, Rhode Island
North Providence West Little League
South Region
Orlando, Florida
Pine Castle Little League
West Region
(Washington (state)) Mountlake Terrace, Washington
Mountlake Terrace Little League

== Results ==
Semifinals
Rhode Island	4
Oklahoma	0
(Washington (state)) Washington	0
Florida	16

Championship
Rhode Island	5
Florida	2
Third Place Game
Oklahoma	10
(Washington (state)) Washington	4

1979 Little League Softball World Series Champions
North Providence West Little League
North Providence, Rhode Island
