= 2003 Little League Softball World Series =

Tournament details
- Dates: August 6–August 13
- Teams: 9

Final positions
- Champions: Waco, Texas; Midway Little League
- Runners-up: Naples, Florida; Naples Girls Softball Little League

The 2003 Little League Softball World Series was held in Portland, Oregon from August 6 to August 13, 2003. Nine teams, three international teams and six from the United States, competed for the Little League Softball World Series Championship.

== Teams ==
Each team that competed in the tournament came out of one of nine qualifying regions.

Pool A	Pool B
Canada Region; Victoria, British Columbia; Layritz Little League	Central Region; Escanaba, Michigan; Escanaba Little League
East Region; Upper Darby, Pennsylvania; Upper Darby Little League	Europe Region; Tuchkovo, Russia; Carrousel Little League
Host District (Oregon District 4); Beaverton, Oregon; Beaverton Area Little League	South Region; Naples, Florida; Naples Girls Softball Little League
Latin America Region; San Nicolaas, Aruba; South Little League	West Region; Manhattan Beach, California; Manhattan Little League
Southwest Region; Waco, Texas; Midway Little League	

== Results ==
Pool A
Rank	Region	Record
1	Texas	4–0
2	Oregon	3–1
4	Pennsylvania	2–2
3	Aruba	1–3
5	Canada	0–4

Pool B
Rank	Region	Record
1	Florida	3–0
2	California	2–1
3	Michigan	1–2
4	Russia	0–3

Pool	Away	Score	Home	Score
August 6
A	Texas	13	Oregon	3
A	Pennsylvania	3	Aruba	2
B	California	2	Florida	3
August 7
A	Pennsylvania	10	Canada	0
B	Michigan	17	Russia	8
A	Oregon	11	Aruba	1
August 8
B	Michigan	0	Florida	6
A	Texas	4	Pennsylvania	0
A	Canada	1	Aruba	6
B	California	21	Russia	6
August 9
A	Oregon	10	Canada	0
A	Texas	17	Aruba	1
B	Pennsylvania	2	California	4
August 10
A	Canada	0	Texas	14
B	Russia	1	Florida	11
A	Oregon	7	Pennsylvania	4
August 12
7th Place	Canada	9	Aruba	10
5th Place	Pennsylvania	3	Michigan	1

=== Elimination round ===
Semifinals
A1	Texas	9
B2	California	0
B1	Florida	9
A2	Oregon	1

Finals
A1	Texas	16
B1	Florida	10
Third place
B2	California	1
A2	Oregon	8

2003 Little League Softball World Series Champions
Midway Little League
Waco, Texas
