= 2024 Little League Softball World Series =

Softball Tournament

Tournament details
- Dates: August 4–August 11
- Teams: 12

Final positions
- Champions: Winterville, North Carolina; Pitt County Girls Softball LL
- Runners-up: Sterlington, Louisiana; Sterlington LL

The 2024 Little League Softball World Series was held in Greenville, North Carolina from August 4 to August 11, 2024.

Play was postponed for two days on August 7 and August 8 due to rain resulting from the remnants of Hurricane Debby. Play was resumed on August 9 at Max R. Joyner Family Stadium on the campus of East Carolina University. To accommodate rescheduled games, the third-place game scheduled for August 11 was canceled.

== Teams ==
Each team that competed in the tournament came out of one of 12 qualifying regions.

Purple Bracket	Orange Bracket
Asia-Pacific Region; Bacolod, Philippines; Negros Occidental LL	Canada Region; Montreal, Quebec; On Field LLS LL
Europe-Africa Region; Bologna, Italy; Emilia Romagna LL	Central Region; Austintown, Ohio; Austintown LL
Host Region (North Carolina); Winterville, North Carolina; Pitt County Girls Softball LL	Latin America Region; Monterrey, Mexico; Jose Gonzalez Torres LL
Mid-Atlantic Region; Greensburg, Pennsylvania; West Point LL	Northwest Region; Eagle, Idaho; West Valley LL
New England Region; Cranston, Rhode Island; Cranston Western LL	Southeast Region; Salisbury, North Carolina; Rowan County LL
West Region; Willcox, Arizona; Willcox LL	Southwest Region; Sterlington, Louisiana; Sterlington LL

== Results ==
=== Purple Bracket ===
==== Winner's Bracket ====
First Round
Arizona	2
Pennsylvania	1
Philippines (F/4)	0
North Carolina (Host)	10

Second Round
Arizona	0
Rhode Island	3
Italy (F/4)	0
North Carolina (Host)	16

Winner's Bracket Final
Rhode Island (F/3)	0
North Carolina (Host)	16

==== Elimination Bracket ====
First Round
Pennsylvania	2
Italy	1
Philippines	5
Arizona	2

Second Round
Pennsylvania	2
Philippines	0
Elimination Bracket Final
Pennsylvania (F/4)	10
Rhode Island	0

=== Orange Bracket ===
==== Winner's Bracket ====
First Round
Idaho	0
Louisiana	5
Mexico	0
Ohio	6

Second Round
Louisiana	8
Canada	0
North Carolina (SE)	0
Ohio	2

Winner's Bracket Final
Louisiana (F/4)	12
Ohio	0

==== Elimination Bracket ====
First Round
Idaho	0
North Carolina (SE)	9
Mexico	4
Canada	2

Second Round
North Carolina (SE)	3
Mexico	0
Elimination Bracket Final
North Carolina (SE)	3
Ohio	1

=== Semifinals and Finals ===
Bracket Championships
North Carolina (Host)	1
Pennsylvania	0
Louisiana	2
North Carolina (SE)	1

Championship Game
North Carolina (Host)	1
Louisiana	0

2024 Little League Softball World Series Champions
Pitt County Girls Softball Little League
Winterville, North Carolina
