= 2001 Little League Softball World Series =

Tournament details
- Dates: August 10–August 15
- Teams: 8

Final positions
- Champions: Maunabo, Puerto Rico; Rosario Y Cardona Little League
- Runners-up: Waco, Texas; Midway Little League

The 2001 Little League Softball World Series was held in Portland, Oregon from August 10 to August 15, 2001. Four teams from the United States and four from throughout the world competed for the Little League Softball World Champions.

== Teams ==
Each team that competed in the tournament came out of one of eight qualifying regions.

Pool A	Pool B
Waco, Texas; South Region; Midway LL	(Washington (state)) Kirkland, Washington; West Region; Kirkland National LL
Wheelersburg, Ohio; Central Region; Wheelersburg LL	Greensburg, Pennsylvania; East Region; West Point LL
The Hague, Netherlands; Europe Region; West Nederland LL	Windsor, Ontario; Canada Region; Turtle Club LL
Bacolod, Philippines; Far East Region; Bacolod City LL	Maunabo, Puerto Rico; Latin America Region; Rosario Y Cardona LL

== Results ==
Pool A
Rank	Region	Record
1	(Texas) South	3–0
2	(Philippines) Far East	2–1
3	(Ohio) Central	1–2
4	(Netherlands) Europe	0–3

Pool B
Rank	Region	Record
1	(Puerto Rico) Latin America	3–0
2	(Washington (state)) West	2–1
3	(Pennsylvania) East	1–2
4	Canada	0–3

Pool	Away	Score	Home	Score	Time (Venue)
August 10
A	(Texas) South	11	(Ohio) Central	3	5:30pm (Main)
A	(Netherlands) Europe	15	(Philippines) Far East	16	6:00pm (West)
B	Canada	0	(Puerto Rico) Latin America	6	6:15pm (East)
B	(Washington (state)) West	12	(Pennsylvania) East	2	8:00pm (Main)
August 11
A	(Ohio) Central	3	(Philippines) Far East	4	12:00pm (Main)
B	(Pennsylvania) East	1	(Puerto Rico) Latin America	11	2:30pm (Main)
A	(Texas) South	19	(Netherlands) Europe	4	5:00pm (Main)
B	(Washington (state)) West	10	Canada	0	7:00pm (Main)
August 12
A	(Ohio) Central	11	(Netherlands) Europe	1	12:00pm (East)
B	(Pennsylvania) East	5	Canada	2	12:15pm (West)
A	(Texas) South	16	(Philippines) Far East	0	12:30pm (Main)
B	(Washington (state)) West	0	(Puerto Rico) Latin America	3	3:00pm (Main)
August 14
5th	A3 (Ohio) Central	0	B3 (Pennsylvania) East	6	12:45pm (West)
7th	A4 (Netherlands) Europe	6	B4 Canada	9	1:00pm (East)

=== Elimination round ===
Semifinals
A1	(Texas) South	4
B2	(Washington (state)) West	2
B1	(Puerto Rico) Latin America	10
A2	(Philippines) Far East	1

Finals
WSF1	(Texas) South	3
WSF2	(Puerto Rico) Latin America	4
Third place
LSF1	(Washington (state)) West	7
LSF2	(Philippines) Far East	2

2001 Little League Softball World Series champions
