= 2026 Little League Softball World Series =

Softball Tournament

Tournament details
- Dates: August 2–August 9
- Teams: 12

Final positions
- Champions: Clayton, North Carolina; Johnston County LL
- Runners-up: Owensboro, Kentucky; Daviess County LL

The 2026 Little League Softball World Series was a softball tournament that took place in Greenville, North Carolina from August 2 to August 9, 2026.

== Teams ==
Each of the teams that are competing in the tournament came out of one of 12 qualifying regions.

Purple Bracket	Orange Bracket
Canada Region; Repentigny, Quebec; On Field LLS Little League	Asia-Pacific Region; Sangō, Japan; Kinki Softball Little League
Europe-Africa Region; Bologna, Italy; Emilia Romagna Little League	Central Region; Owensboro, Kentucky; Daviess County Little League
Host Region (North Carolina); Clayton, North Carolina; Johnston County Little League	Latin America Region; Guayama, Puerto Rico; Guayama Softball Little League
Northwest Region (Washington (state)) Snohomish, Washington; Snohomish Little League	Mid-Atlantic Region; Toms River, New Jersey; Toms River Little League
Southeast Region; Lake Mary, Florida; Lake Mary Little League	New England Region; Bristol, Connecticut; Bristol Girls Softball Little League
Southwest Region; Helotes, Texas; Greater Helotes Little League	West Region; Live Oak, California; Live Oak Little League

== Results ==
=== Purple Bracket ===
==== Winner's Bracket ====
First Round
Florida	14
(Washington (state)) Washington	0 (F/4)
Canada	4 (F/4)
North Carolina	16

Second Round
Italy	0 (F/3)
Florida	15
Texas	1
North Carolina	2

Winner's Bracket Final
Florida	2
North Carolina	5

==== Elimination Bracket ====
First Round
(Washington (state)) Washington	7
Texas	3
Canada	2
Italy	1

Second Round
(Washington (state)) Washington	9
Canada	1
Elimination Bracket Final
(Washington (state)) Washington	0
Florida	5

=== Orange Bracket ===
==== Winner's Bracket ====
First Round
New Jersey	1
Japan	4
California	1 (F/4)
Kentucky	11

Second Round
Puerto Rico	7
Japan	2
Connecticut	1 (F/4)
Kentucky	15

Winner's Bracket Final
Puerto Rico	0
Kentucky	2

==== Elimination Bracket ====
First Round
New Jersey	13
Connecticut	3
California	0
Japan	1

Second Round
New Jersey	11
Japan	0
Elimination Bracket Final
New Jersey	4
Puerto Rico	0

=== Semifinals and Finals ===
Bracket Championships
North Carolina	4
Florida	0
Kentucky	2
New Jersey	1

Championship Game
North Carolina	2
Kentucky	0
Third Place Game
Florida	5
New Jersey	4

2026 Little League Softball World Series Champions
Johnston County Little League
Clayton, North Carolina
