= 2015 Little League Softball World Series =

Tournament details
- Dates: August 13–August 19
- Teams: 10

Final positions
- Champions: Rowan, North Carolina; Rowan Little League
- Runners-up: Warwick, Rhode Island; Warwick North Little League

The 2015 Little League Softball World Series was held in Portland, Oregon from August 13 to August 19, 2015. Six teams from the United States and four from throughout the world competed for the Little League Softball World Champions. A controversy arose when the Snohomish, Washington team was accused of "throwing" a game so as not to have to face the Central Team from Slater/Polk City, IA. As a result, the favored Iowa team was forced to use their ace pitcher, Mikayla Houge (who later pitched four years at University of Virginia), in a tie-breaker game, where Iowa prevailed. Unfortunately, Mikayla was then unable to pitch in the semi-finals. Iowa lost that semi-finals game, effectively ending their chance at advancing to the Finals and winning the World Series. In a bit of irony, the Southeast team that advanced due to the thrown game ended up winning the championship.

== Teams ==
Each team that competes in the tournament will come out of one of the 10 regions.

United States	International
Slater, Iowa; Central Region; Central Iowa LL	Makati City, Philippines; Asia-Pacific; ILLAM LL
Warwick, Rhode Island; East Region; Warwick North LL	Victoria, British Columbia; Canada; Layritz LL
Salisbury, North Carolina; Southeast Region; Rowan LL	Kampala, Uganda; Europe & Africa; AVRS Secondary School LL
Seguin, Texas; Southwest Region; Seguin LL	Maunabo, Puerto Rico; Latin America; ASOFEM LL
(Washington (state)) Snohomish, Washington; West Region; South Snohomish LL	Four International Teams
Tigard, Oregon; Oregon District 4 Tigard LL	Four International Teams

== Results ==
Pool A
Rank	Region	Record	Runs Allowed	Defensive Innings	Run Ratio
1	(Rhode Island) East	3–1	13	23	.565
2	(Texas) Southwest	3–1	8	24	.333
3	(Uganda) Europe & Africa	2–2	19	21	.905
4	(Puerto Rico) Latin America	1–3	26	23	1.130
5	Oregon D4	1–3	18	22	.818

Pool B
Rank	Region	Record	Runs Allowed	Defensive Innings	Run Ratio
1	(North Carolina) Southeast	3–1	4	22	.182
2	(Iowa) Central	3–1	5	22	.227
3	(Washington (state)) West	3–1	11	20	.550
4	(Philippines) Asia Pacific	1–3	37	16	2.313
5	Canada	0–4	39	20	1.95

All times US PST.

Pool	Away	Score	Home	Score	Time
August 13
A	(Uganda) Europe & Africa	1	(Texas) Southwest	9	10:00am
B	(Philippines) Asia Pacific	0	(Washington (state)) West	11 (F/4)	1:00pm
B	(North Carolina) Southeast	10	Canada	1	4:00pm
A	Oregon D4	3	(Puerto Rico) Latin America	4	7:00pm
August 14
B	Canada	0	(Washington (state)) West	10 (F/5)	10:00am
A	Oregon D4	1	(Texas) Southwest	8	1:00pm
B	(Philippines) Asia Pacific	0	(Iowa) Central	12 (F/4)	4:00pm
A	(Rhode Island) East	2	(Uganda) Europe & Africa	3	7:00pm
August 15
B	(North Carolina) Southeast	1	(Iowa) Central	3	10:00am
A	(Puerto Rico) Latin America	9	(Rhode Island) East	10	3:00pm
A	(Uganda) Europe & Africa	1	Oregon D4	8	5:30pm
B	Canada	2	(Philippines) Asia Pacific	13 (F/4)	7:30pm
August 16
A	(Puerto Rico) Latin America	0	(Uganda) Europe & Africa	10 (F/5)	10:00am
B	(North Carolina) Southeast	12 (F/5)	(Philippines) Asia Pacific	0	1:00pm
A	(Rhode Island) East	4	(Texas) Southwest	1	4:00pm
B	(Iowa) Central	3	(Washington (state)) West	4	7:00pm
August 17
A	Oregon D4	0	(Rhode Island) East	5	10:00am
B	Canada	0	(Iowa) Central	7	1:00pm
B	(Washington (state)) West	0	(North Carolina) Southeast	8	4:00pm
A	(Texas) Southwest	3	(Puerto Rico) Latin America	2	7:00pm
August 18
9th	A5 Oregon D4	14	B5 Canada	8	9:00am
August 19
7th	4B (Philippines) Asia Pacific	11	4A (Puerto Rico) Latin America	2	9:30am
5th	3B (Washington (state)) West	4	3A (Uganda) Europe & Africa	1	11:30am

=== Elimination round ===
Semifinals
A1	(Rhode Island) East	5
B2	(Iowa) Central	4
B1	(North Carolina) Southeast	8
A2	(Texas) Southwest	0

Finals
WSF1	(Rhode Island) East	2
WSF2	(North Carolina) Southeast	4
Third place
LSF1	(Iowa) Central	9
LSF2	(Texas) Southwest	2

2015 Little League Softball World Series Champions
Rowan Little League
Salisbury, North Carolina
