= Punta Yeguas =

Nature reserve in Yabucoa, Puerto Rico

- Inés María Mendoza Nature Reserve
- IUCN category IV (habitat/species management area)
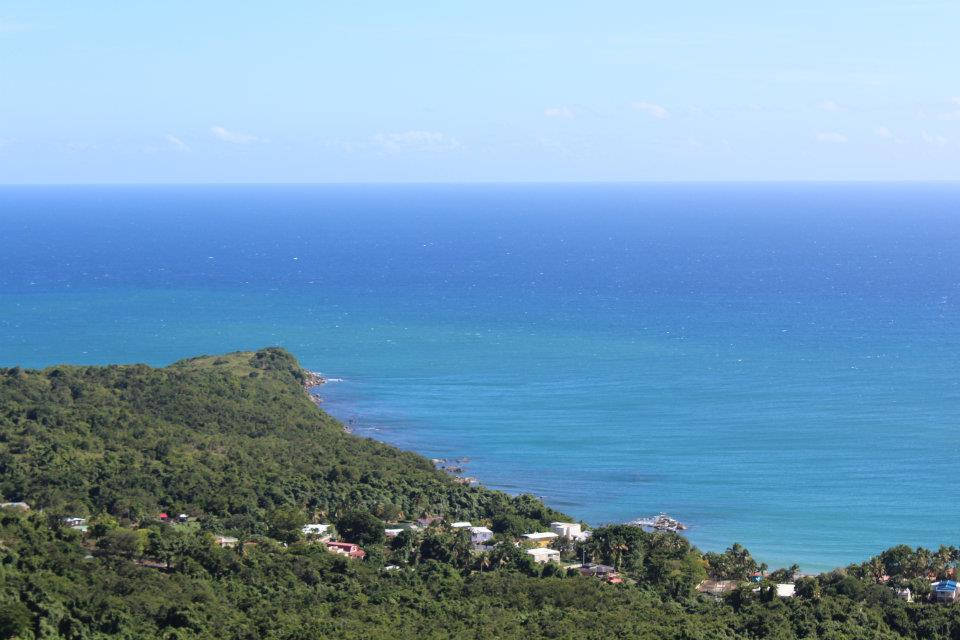
- Partial view of Punta Yeguas from PR-901

- Location within Puerto Rico
- Location: Yabucoa, Puerto Rico
- Coordinates: 18°1′9.156″N 65°50′14.28″W
- Area: 280 acres (110 ha)
- Established: 1975
- Governing body: Conservation Trust of Puerto Rico

Punta Yeguas (Spanish for "mares' point") is a headland and nature reserve located in the Camino Nuevo barrio of Yabucoa, Puerto Rico. Geographically, the headland corresponds to the orographic kneeling of the Sierra Pandura, a mountain range which extends eastward from the Sierra de Cayey.

== Inés María Mendoza Nature Reserve ==
The headland, along with the hilly and coastal ecosystems around it, are protected under the Inés María Mendoza Nature Reserve (Reserva Natural Inés María Mendoza), established by the Puerto Rico Conservation Trust (Para la Naturaleza), and named after Inés María Mendoza, former First Lady of Puerto Rico and renown educator and conservationist. The 280-acre protected area includes a humid subtropical forest, and three steep cliffs composed of sedimentary rock, in addition to 85 species of plants, 37 species of birds, 8 species of reptiles, 6 species of amphibians and 4 endemic vertebrates. The endangered and endemic ortegon tree (Coccoloba rugosa) can also be found within the preserve.

The main hiking trail within the reserve leads to Teresa Beach (Playa Teresa), a sandy cove beach located between Punta Yeguas and Punta Teresa, while a secondary trail leads to the end of Punta Yeguas. These trails offer panoramic views of the Caribbean Sea, the island of Vieques, and the Punta Tuna Lighthouse and Cape Mala Pascua in Maunabo.

The area suffered from the impact of Hurricane Maria on Wednesday, September 20, 2017, when the category 4 hurricane made landfall just north of Punta Yeguas within the area of the nature reserve.

== See also ==
- Protected areas of Puerto Rico
- Sierra Pandura
