= Palo Seco =

Palo Seco may refer to:

- Palo Seco, Catamarca, in Argentina
- Palo Seco Forest Reserve, in Panama
- Palo Seco, Maunabo, Puerto Rico, a barrio
- Palo Seco, Toa Baja, Puerto Rico, a barrio
- Palo Seco, Trinidad and Tobago
- Palo Seco Velodrome
