= Junior League World Series (softball) =

Softball tournament for girls between ages 12 and 14

The Junior League Softball World Series is a softball tournament for girls aged between 12 and 14. The tournament is administered by Little League Baseball, Inc. and is held annually in the Seattle suburb of Kirkland, Washington.

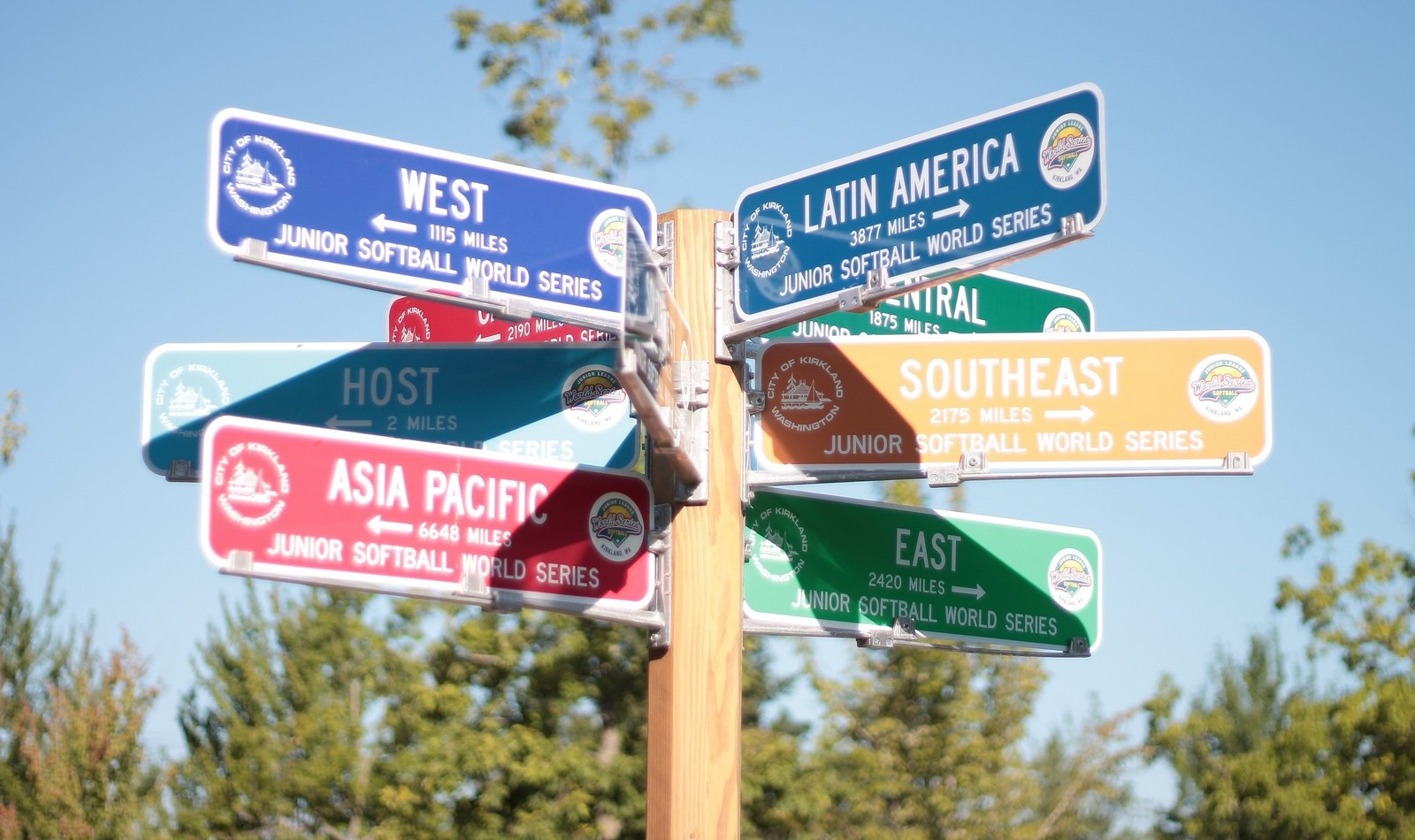
Junior League Softball World Series welcome sign

== Tournament format ==
The tournament started in 1999, and is a true "World Series" since ten regions from around the world send in teams:

- Asia-Pacific
- Canada
- Europe/Africa
- Latin America
- United States (USA) Central
- USA East
- USA South
- USA Southwest
- USA West
- Host team (Washington District 9)

The ten teams are divided into two pools of five members each. The top 4 teams from each pool then advance to the quarter-finals (Pool A 1st vs Pool B 4th, Pool B 2nd vs Pool A 3rd, etc). The winners of each quarter final face off in the semi-finals. The semi-final winners play for the championship. All matches are single-elimination games.

The losers of the quarter-final games, and the bottom team in each pool, play in friendship games. The losers of the semi-final games play each other in a consolation final. All pool play and bracket games are streamed on ESPN+. Friendship games are not streamed.

== List of champions ==
=== Champions per year ===
Year	Winner	Score	Runner-Up
1999	Woodway-Hewitt, Texas	4–1	USA West
2000	Naples, Florida	12–3	USA East
2001	Naples, Florida	5–3	(Washington (state)); Washington District 9 (Host)
2002	Utrecht, Netherlands	5–3	Tampa Bay, Florida
2003	Bacolod, Philippines	2–0	Manuabo, Puerto Rico
2004	South Bend, Indiana	10–1	Giddings, Texas
2005	Lake Wales, Florida	4–0	La Grange, Texas
2006	Naples, Florida	8–0	Bacolod, Philippines
2007	Maunabo, Puerto Rico	16–6	Westchester-Del Rey, California
2008	Oro Valley, Arizona	10–4	Maunabo, Puerto Rico
2009	Maunabo, Puerto Rico	2–1	Elyria, Ohio
2010	Maunabo, Puerto Rico	4–3	Tampa, Florida
2011	Croswell, Michigan	10–0	Tampa, Florida
2012	Anchorage, Alaska	6–2	Victoria, British Columbia, Canada
2013	Tampa, Florida	10–1	(Washington (state)); Kirkland, Washington
2014	Greensburg, Pennsylvania	6–2	Mexicali, Mexico
2015	Tampa, Florida	9–2	Norzagaray, Philippines
2016	Maunabo, Puerto Rico	8–6	Victoria, British Columbia, Canada
2017	Poland, Ohio	7–1	(Washington (state)); Kirkland, Washington
2018	Santa Clara, Utah	9–3	Smithville, Texas
2019	Tampa, Florida	7–6	Columbus, Texas
2020	Cancelled due to COVID-19 crisis		
2021	Cancelled due to COVID-19 crisis		
2022	Jenison, Michigan	5–1	Irmo, South Carolina
2023	Bago, Philippines	3–0	Milford, Connecticut
2024	Prague, Czech Republic	5–3	Poland, Ohio
2025	Columbus, Texas	2-0	Evergreen Park, Illinois
2026	Charlotte, North Carolina	6-4	Palo Cedro, California

=== Championships per location ===
Flag	Winner	Total	Years
(Puerto Rico)	Maunabo, Puerto Rico	4	2007, 2009, 2010, 2016
(Florida)	Naples, Florida	3	2000, 2001, 2006
(Florida)	Tampa, Florida	3	2013, 2015, 2019
(Utah)	Santa Clara, Utah	1	2018
(Alaska)	Anchorage, Alaska	1	2012
(Pennsylvania)	Greensburg, Pennsylvania	1	2014
(Texas)	Columbus, Texas	1	2025
(Michigan)	Croswell, Michigan	1	2011
(Michigan)	Jenison, Michigan	1	2022
(Arizona)	Oro Valley, Arizona	1	2008
(Florida)	Lake Wales, Florida	1	2005
(Ohio)	Poland, Ohio	1	2017
(Indiana)	South Bend, Indiana	1	2004
(Philippines)	Bacolod, Philippines	1	2003
(Philippines)	Bago, Philippines	1	2023
(Netherlands)	Utrecht, Netherlands	1	2002
(Texas)	Woodway-Hewitt, Texas	1	1999

== See also ==
- Little League Softball World Series
- List of Little League Softball World Series champions by division
