= List of Little League Softball World Series champions by division =

This article details the list of girls' Little League Softball World Series winners by division. There are currently three girls' Softball World Series tournaments conducted each summer by Little League Baseball and Softball (also known as Little League International). (There are also three boys' Softball World Series tournaments played each summer.)

== Little League Softball Divisions ==
Division	Current Location	First Held	Age of players	Series
Little League Softball	Greenville, North Carolina	1974	11–12 years old	Little League Softball World Series
Junior League Softball	Kirkland, Washington	1999	12–14 years old	Junior League Softball World Series
Senior League Softball	Sussex County, Delaware	1976	13–16 years old	Senior League Softball World Series
Big League Softball	Discontinued in 2016	1982	14–18 years old	Big League Softball World Series

== Champions by year ==
Year	Little	Junior	Senior	Big
1974	Tampa, Florida	First Held in 1999	First Held in 1976	First Held in 1982
1975	Medford, Oregon	Not Yet Created	Not Yet Created	Not Yet Created
1976	Salinas, N. California	Not Yet Created	Tampa, Florida	Not Yet Created
1977	Salinas, N. California	Not Yet Created	Tampa, Florida	Not Yet Created
1978	Shippensburg, Pennsylvania	Not Yet Created	Tampa, Florida	Not Yet Created
1979	North Providence, Rhode Island	Not Yet Created	Gaylord, Michigan	Not Yet Created
1980	Glendale, S. California	Not Yet Created	Naples, Florida	Not Yet Created
1981	Gresham, Oregon	Not Yet Created	Shippensburg, Pennsylvania	Not Yet Created
1982	Glendale, S. California	Not Yet Created	Naples, Florida	Tampa, Florida
1983	Naples, Florida	Not Yet Created	Orange Park, Florida	Tampa, Florida
1984	Albuquerque, New Mexico	Not Yet Created	Naples, Florida	Williamsport, Pennsylvania
1985	Brookfield, Illinois	Not Yet Created	Des Moines, Iowa	Williamsport, Pennsylvania
1986	Tampa, Florida	Not Yet Created	Jenison, Michigan	Tallmadge, Ohio
1987	Tampa, Florida	Not Yet Created	Campbell, N. California	San Jose, N. California
1988	Naples, Florida	Not Yet Created	Tigard, Oregon	Portland, Maine
1989	Naples, Florida	Not Yet Created	Naples, Florida	Portland, Maine
1990	Glendale, S. California	Not Yet Created	Naples, Florida	Williamsport, Pennsylvania
1991	Naples, Florida	Not Yet Created	Naples, Florida	Waco, W. Texas
1992	Waco, W. Texas	Not Yet Created	Naples, Florida	Orlando, Florida
1993	Waco, W. Texas	Not Yet Created	Naples, Florida	(Washington (state)) Kirkland, Washington
1994	Waco, W. Texas	Not Yet Created	Naples, Florida	Williamsport, Pennsylvania
1995	Waco, W. Texas	Not Yet Created	Naples, Florida	Tampa, Florida
1996	Clearwater, Florida	Not Yet Created	Naples, Florida	Lancaster, S. California
1997	Waco, W. Texas	Not Yet Created	Lancaster, S. California	Waldorf, Maryland
1998	Waco, W. Texas	Not Yet Created	Portage, Michigan	Waldorf, Maryland
1999	Waco, W. Texas	Waco, W. Texas	Wilmington, Delaware	Waldorf, Maryland
2000	Waco, W. Texas	Naples, Florida	Eloy, Arizona	Kalamazoo, Michigan (H)
2001	Maunabo, Puerto Rico	Naples, Florida	Glendale, S. California	Waldorf, Maryland
2002	Waco, W. Texas	Apeldoorn, Netherlands	Waco, W. Texas	Grand Rapids, Michigan
2003	Waco, W. Texas	Bacolod, Philippines	Pilot Mountain, North Carolina	Waldorf, Maryland
2004	Waco, W. Texas	South Bend, Indiana	Maunabo, Puerto Rico	Grand Rapids, Michigan
2005	McLean, Virginia	Lake Wales, Florida	Tampa, Florida	Lancaster, S. California
2006	Mattawan, Michigan	Naples, Florida	Milton, Pennsylvania	Kalamazoo, Michigan (H)
2007	Morristown, Tennessee	Maunabo, Puerto Rico	San Antonio, W. Texas	Milford, Connecticut
2008	Simpsonville, South Carolina	Oro Valley, Arizona	Maunabo, Puerto Rico	Grand Rapids, Michigan
2009	(Georgia (U.S. state)) Warner Robins, Georgia	Maunabo, Puerto Rico	Calhoun, Louisiana	Kalamazoo, Michigan (H)
2010	(Georgia (U.S. state)) Warner Robins, Georgia	Maunabo, Puerto Rico	San Antonio, W. Texas	Grand Rapids, Michigan
2011	Sterling, Illinois	Croswell, Michigan	Laurel, Delaware (H)	Grand Rapids, Michigan
2012	Albuquerque, New Mexico	Anchorage, Alaska	Maunabo, Puerto Rico	Manila, Philippines
2013	Tucson, Arizona	Tampa, Florida	South Bend, Indiana	Laurel, Delaware (H)
2014	Robbinsville, New Jersey	Greensburg, Pennsylvania	South Bend, Indiana	Milford, Delaware
2015	Rowan County, North Carolina	Tampa, Florida	Missoula, Montana	Calhoun, Louisiana
2016	Helotes, W. Texas	Maunabo, Puerto Rico	Cape Coral, Florida	San Juan, Puerto Rico
2017	Waco, W. Texas	Poland, Ohio	Georgetown, Delaware (H)	Discontinued in 2016
2018	Wheelersburg, Ohio	Santa Clara, Utah	Batangas, Philippines	No Longer Held
2019	Salisbury, North Carolina	Tampa, Florida	Waco, W. Texas	No Longer Held
2020	Cancelled due to COVID-19 crisis			No Longer Held
2021	Muskogee, Oklahoma	Cancelled due to COVID-19 crisis		No Longer Held
2022	Hewitt, W. Texas	Jenison, Michigan	Waco, W. Texas	No Longer Held
2023	(New York (state)) Massapequa, New York	Bago, Philippines	District 17, Illinois	No Longer Held
2024	Winterville, North Carolina	Prague, Czech Republic	Beardstown, Illinois	No Longer Held
2025	Johnstown, Pennsylvania	Columbus, Texas	Grand Blanc, Michigan	No Longer Held
2026	Clayton, North Carolina (H)	Charlotte, North Carolina	Grand Blanc, Michigan	No Longer Held
Year	Little	Junior	Senior	Big

- (H) Host team

== Statistics ==
=== World Series won by Country / State ===
Rank	Country / State	Total	Little	Junior	Senior	Big
1	Florida	36	8	7	17	4
2	West Texas	21	14	1	5	1
3	Michigan	12	1	2	4	5
4	Puerto Rico	9	1	4	3	1
5	Pennsylvania	9	2	1	2	4
6	Southern California	7	3	0	2	2
7	(Michigan) (Delaware) Host Team(s)	6	0	0	2	4
8	Maryland	5	0	0	0	5
9	Northern California	4	2	0	1	1
9	Philippines	4	0	2	1	1
10	Oregon	3	2	0	1	0
10	Arizona	3	1	1	1	0
10	Ohio	3	1	1	0	1
10	Indiana	3	0	1	2	0
10	North Carolina	3	2	0	1	0
16	(Georgia (U.S. state)) Georgia	2	2	0	0	0
16	Illinois	2	2	0	0	0
16	New Mexico	2	2	0	0	0
16	Delaware	2	0	0	1	1
16	Louisiana	2	0	0	1	1
16	Maine	2	0	0	0	2
22	Rhode Island	1	1	0	0	0
22	Virginia	1	1	0	0	0
22	Tennessee	1	1	0	0	0
22	South Carolina	1	1	0	0	0
22	New Jersey	1	1	0	0	0
22	Oklahoma	1	1	0	0	0
22	Netherlands	1	0	1	0	0
22	Alaska	1	0	1	0	0
22	Utah	1	0	1	0	0
22	Iowa	1	0	0	1	0
22	Montana	1	0	0	1	0
22	(Washington (state)) Washington	1	0	0	0	1
22	Connecticut	1	0	0	0	1
Rank	Country / State	Total	Little	Junior	Senior	Big

=== Most titles by tournament ===
All Time

World Series	Country / State	Wins	Last win
Little	West Texas	14	2022
Junior	Florida	7	2019
Senior	Florida	17	2016
Big	Maryland	5	2003
Big	Michigan	5	2011

Consecutive

World Series	Country / State	Wins	Span
Little	Florida	4	1986–1989
Little	West Texas	4	1992–1995
Little	West Texas	4	1997–2000
Junior	Florida	2	2000–2001
Junior	Florida	2	2005–2006
Junior	Puerto Rico	2	2009–2010
Senior	Florida	8	1989—1996
Big	Maryland	3	1997–1999

=== Winners of three World Series tournaments in the same year ===
Little / Senior / Big	Year
Florida	1983^{^}

- ^ Won at every World Series level

=== Winners of two World Series tournaments in the same year ===
Little / Junior	Year
West Texas	1999

Little / Senior	Year
Florida	1989, 1991, 1996
West Texas	2002, 2022

Junior / Senior	Year
Florida	2005
Michigan	2011

Junior / Big	Year
Puerto Rico	2016

Senior / Big	Year
Florida	1982, 1992, 1995
Northern California	1987
