= Lizas =

Barrio of Maunabo, Puerto Rico

- Barrio
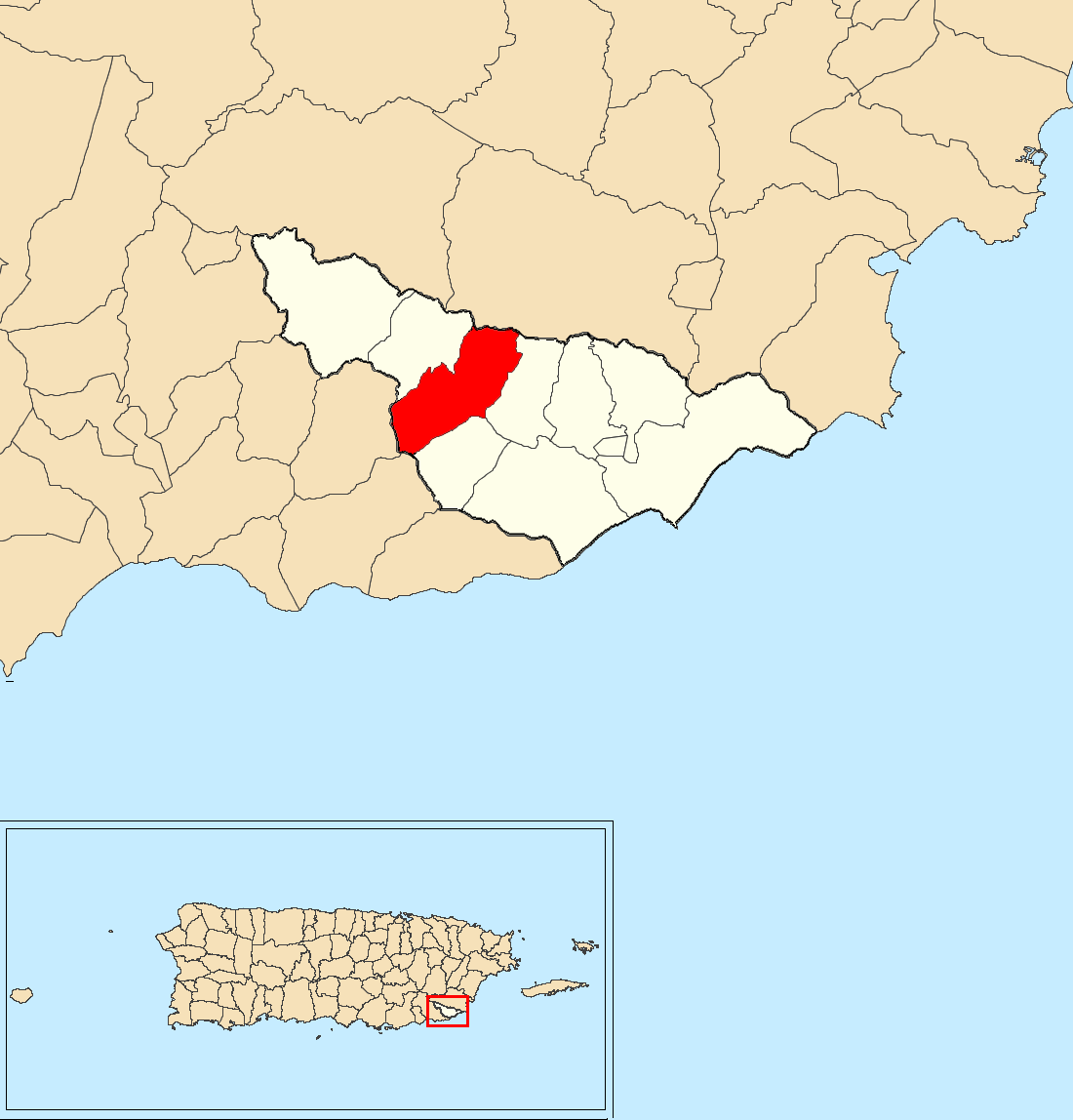
- Location of Lizas within the municipality of Maunabo shown in red

- Location of Puerto Rico
- Coordinates: 18°01′18″N 65°56′20″W
- Commonwealth: Puerto Rico
- Municipality: Maunabo

Area
  - Total: 2.3 sq mi (6.0 km^{2})
  - Land: 2.3 sq mi (6.0 km^{2})
  - Water: 0 sq mi (0 km^{2})
- Elevation: 390 ft (120 m)

Population (2010)
  - Total: 762
  - Density: 331.3/sq mi (127.9/km^{2})
- Source: 2010 Census
- Time zone: UTC−4 (AST)
- ZIP Code: 00707
- Area code: 787/939

Lizas is a barrio in the municipality of Maunabo, Puerto Rico. Its population in 2010 was 762.

== History ==
Lizas was in Spain's gazetteers until Puerto Rico was ceded by Spain in the aftermath of the Spanish–American War under the terms of the Treaty of Paris of 1898 and became an unincorporated territory of the United States. In 1899, the United States Department of War conducted a census of Puerto Rico finding that the combined population of Lizas and Calzada barrios was 1,233.

Historical population
Census	Pop.	Note	%±
1910	822		—
1920	1,025		24.7%
1930	1,024		−0.1%
1940	1,165		13.8%
1950	1,314		12.8%
1960	976		−25.7%
1970	897		−8.1%
1980	906		1.0%
1990	764		−15.7%
2000	834		9.2%
2010	762		−8.6%
U.S. Decennial Census; 1900 (N/A) 1910-1930; 1930-1950 1980-2000 2010

== See also ==
- List of communities in Puerto Rico
