= Matuyas Alto =

Barrio of Maunabo, Puerto Rico

- Barrio
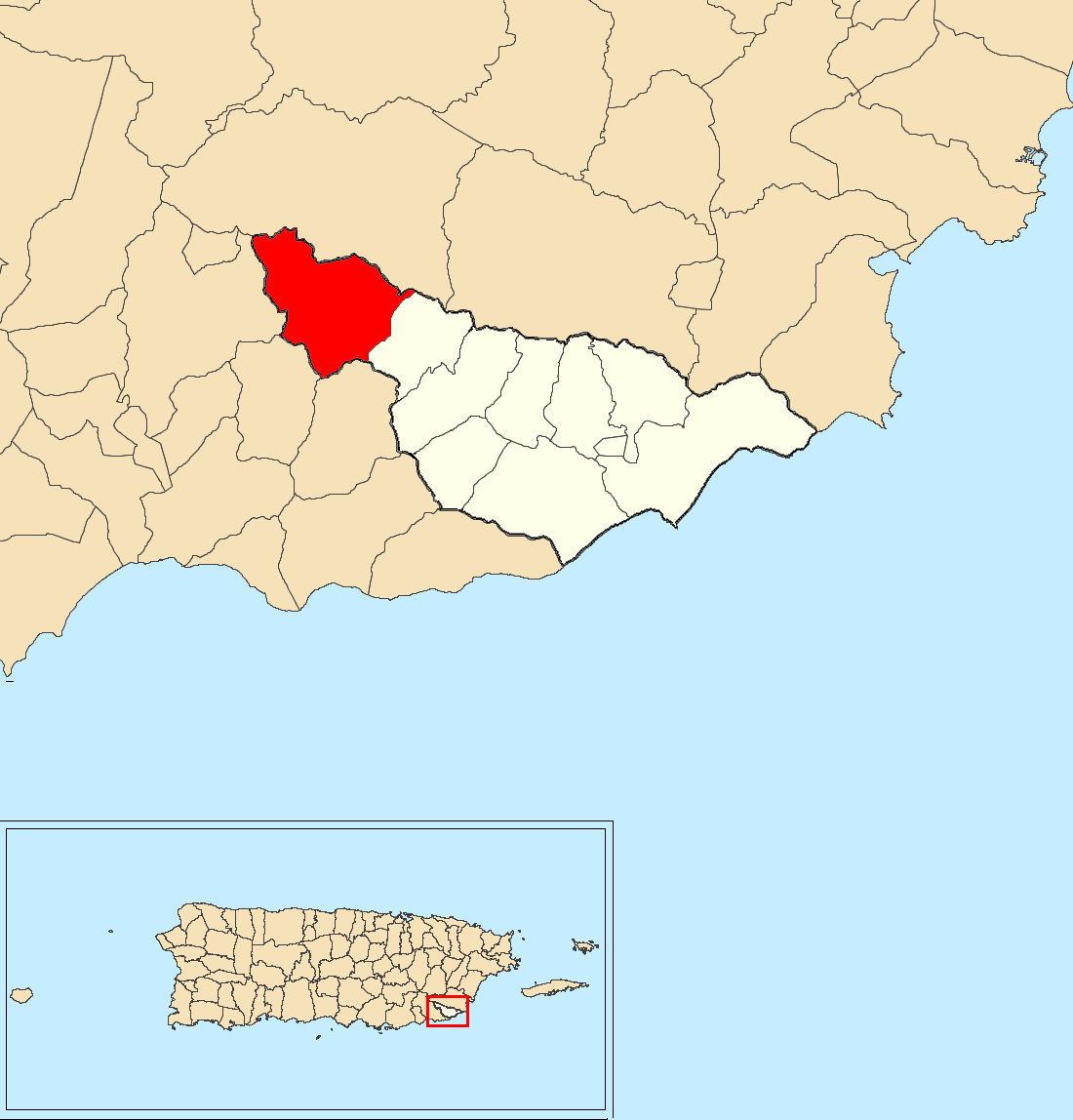
- Location of Matuyas Alto within the municipality of Maunabo shown in red

- Location of Puerto Rico
- Coordinates: 18°02′36″N 65°58′13″W
- Commonwealth: Puerto Rico
- Municipality: Maunabo

Area
  - Total: 3.51 sq mi (9.1 km^{2})
  - Land: 3.51 sq mi (9.1 km^{2})
  - Water: 0 sq mi (0 km^{2})
- Elevation: 840 ft (260 m)

Population (2010)
  - Total: 288
  - Density: 82.1/sq mi (31.7/km^{2})
- Source: 2010 Census
- Time zone: UTC−4 (AST)
- ZIP Code: 00707
- Area code: 787/939

Matuyas Alto is a barrio in the municipality of Maunabo, Puerto Rico. Its population in 2010 was 288.

== History ==
Matuyas Alto was in Spain's gazetteers until Puerto Rico was ceded by Spain in the aftermath of the Spanish–American War under the terms of the Treaty of Paris of 1898 and became an unincorporated territory of the United States. In 1899, the United States Department of War conducted a census of Puerto Rico finding that the combined population of Matuyas Alto and Matuyas Bajo barrios was 941.

Historical population
Census	Pop.	Note	%±
1910	369		—
1920	585		58.5%
1930	559		−4.4%
1940	708		26.7%
1950	676		−4.5%
1960	511		−24.4%
1970	410		−19.8%
1980	269		−34.4%
1990	322		19.7%
2000	413		28.3%
2010	288		−30.3%
U.S. Decennial Census; 1900 (N/A) 1910-1930; 1930-1950 1980-2000 2010

== See also ==
- List of communities in Puerto Rico
