= Sierra Pandura =

Mountain range in Puerto Rico

- Cuchilla de Pandura, La Pica
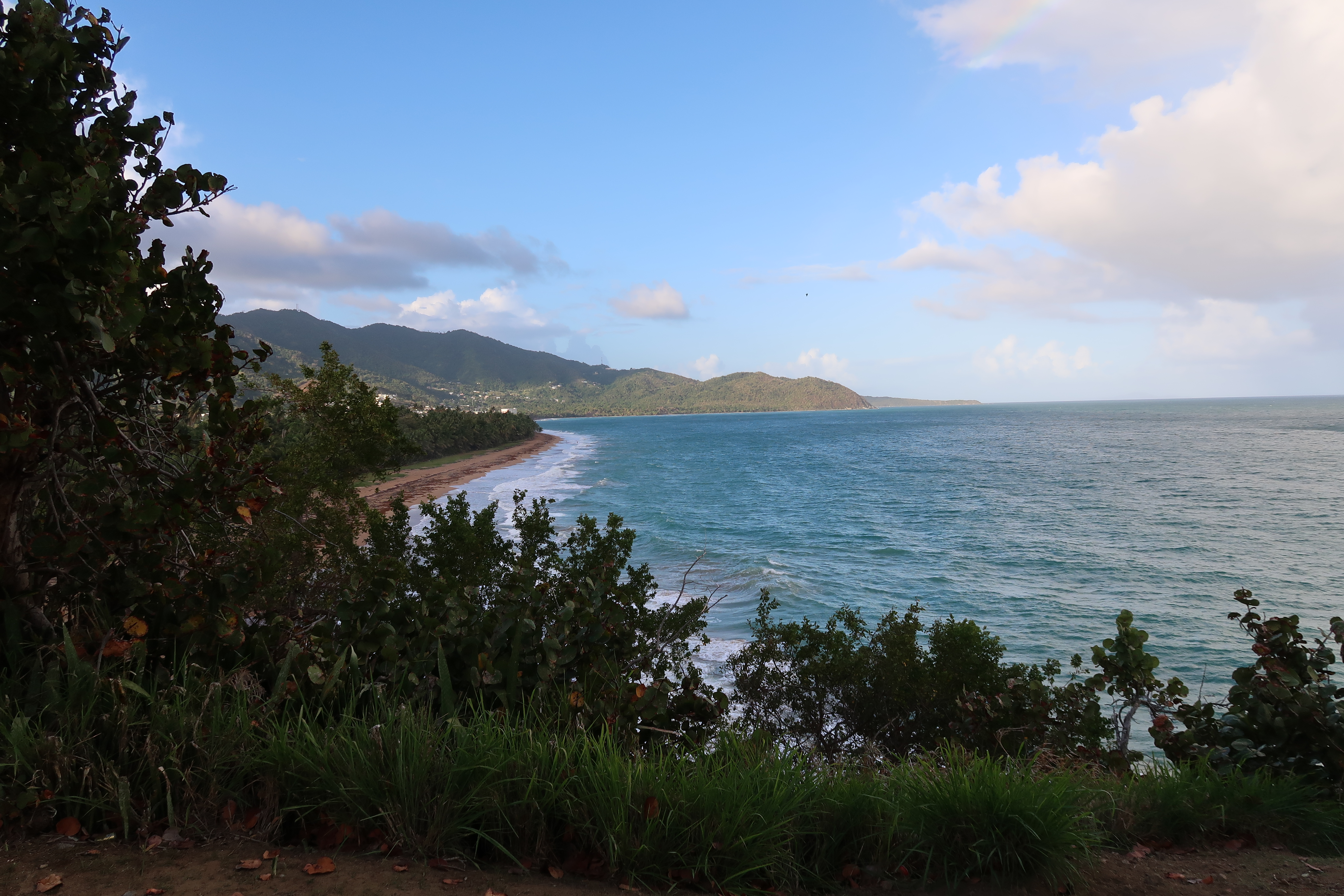
- Eastern end of Sierra Pandura from Punta Tuna.

Highest point
- Peak: Cerro Santa Elena
- Elevation: 1,722 ft (525 m)

Geography
- Location: Maunabo and Yabucoa, Puerto Rico
- Parent range: Cordillera Central

Sierra Pandura, also known as Cuchilla de Pandura (Pandura Ridge) and La Pica, is a mountain range that runs from the Sierra de Cayey in the northwest to the Caribbean Sea in the southeast in southeastern Puerto Rico, between the municipalities of Maunabo and Yabucoa. Together with the Sierra de Guardarraya to the south, Sierra Pandura is part of the San Lorenzo batholith physiological region, a composite body of volcanic origin which bifurcates the mountain ridge.

Sierra Pandura rises to an elevation of 1,722 feet (525 m) above sea level at Cerro Santa Elena, located in the barrio Juan Martín of Yabucoa. Other peaks in the mountain range include Cerro de la Pandura, located near the sector of La Pica with an elevation of 1,692 feet (516 m) above sea level, and El Sombrerito (Spanish for "the little hat") with 1,463 feet (446 m) in elevation.

== Sierra Pandura Protected Natural Area ==
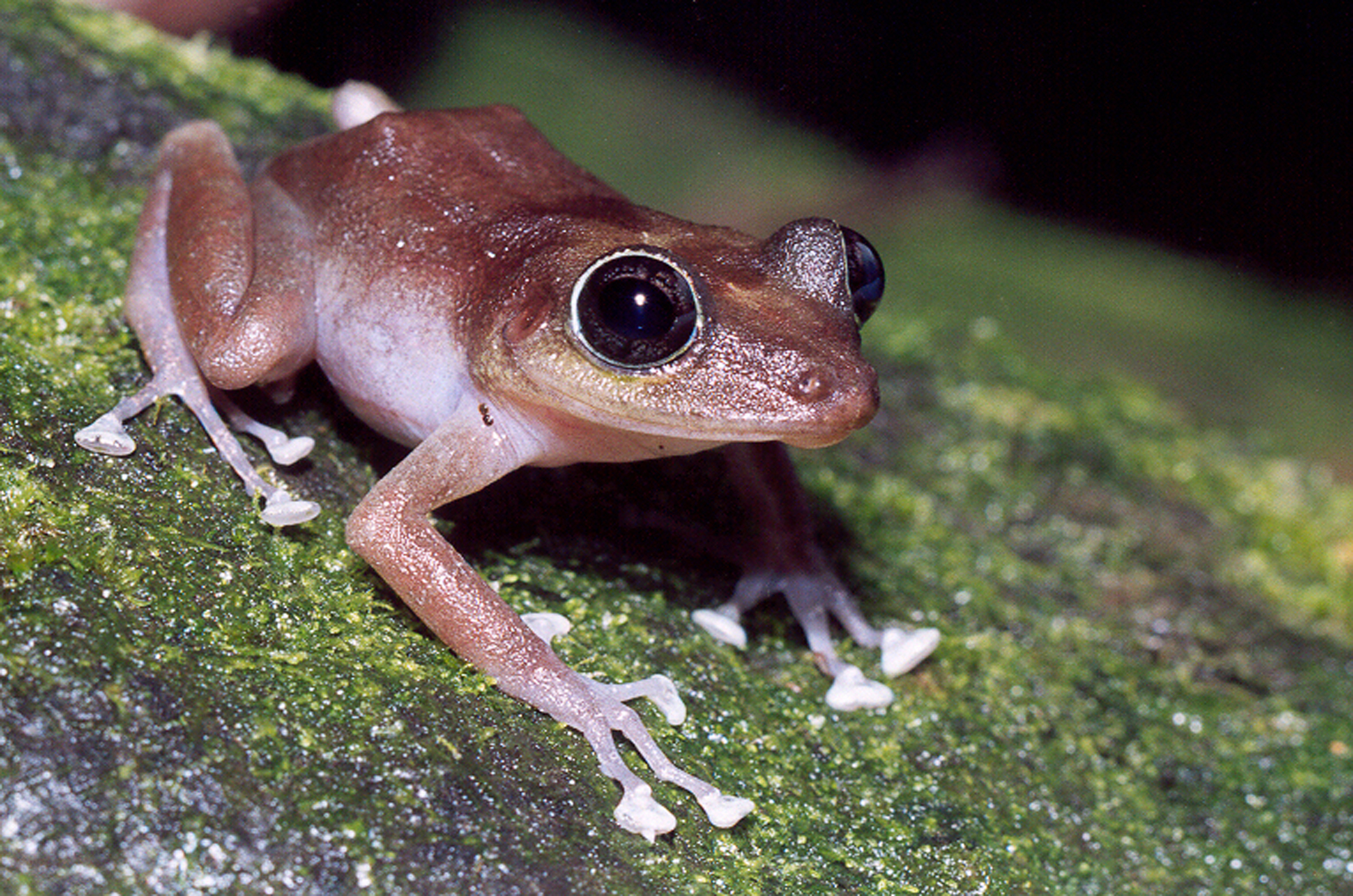
The endangered rock coqui (female pictured) can only be found on this mountain range.

The western portion of Sierra Pandura is protected by the Puerto Rico Conservation Trust as the Sierra Pandura Protected Natural Area (Spanish: Área natural protegida de Sierra Pandura). This protected natural area is one of the last habitats of the rare, endemic and endangered Puerto Rican rock frog (Eleutherodactylus cooki) also known as the rock coqui or the coquí guajón in Spanish. This small species of frog dwells primarily in crevices and grottos (habitats which are locally known as guajonales) of the Sierra Pandura.

The United States Fish and Wildlife Service published a recovery plan for the species that designates a critical habitat of approximately 260.6 acres (105.5 ha) within some surrounding areas on September 24, 2004, the. Due to the limited distribution of the species, specialized habitat uses and the many threats; the Conservation Trust of Puerto Rico intends to permanently protect guajón habitats and the corridors found between existing populations. The three areas comprising a total of 174 acres (70 ha) of the Sierra Pandura National Protected Area are the first land purchases of private land that focus on the protection of the rock coqui's natural habitat.

== See also ==
- Protected areas of Puerto Rico
- Sierra de Guardarraya
