= Tumbao, Maunabo, Puerto Rico =

Barrio of Puerto Rico

Tumbao
- Barrio
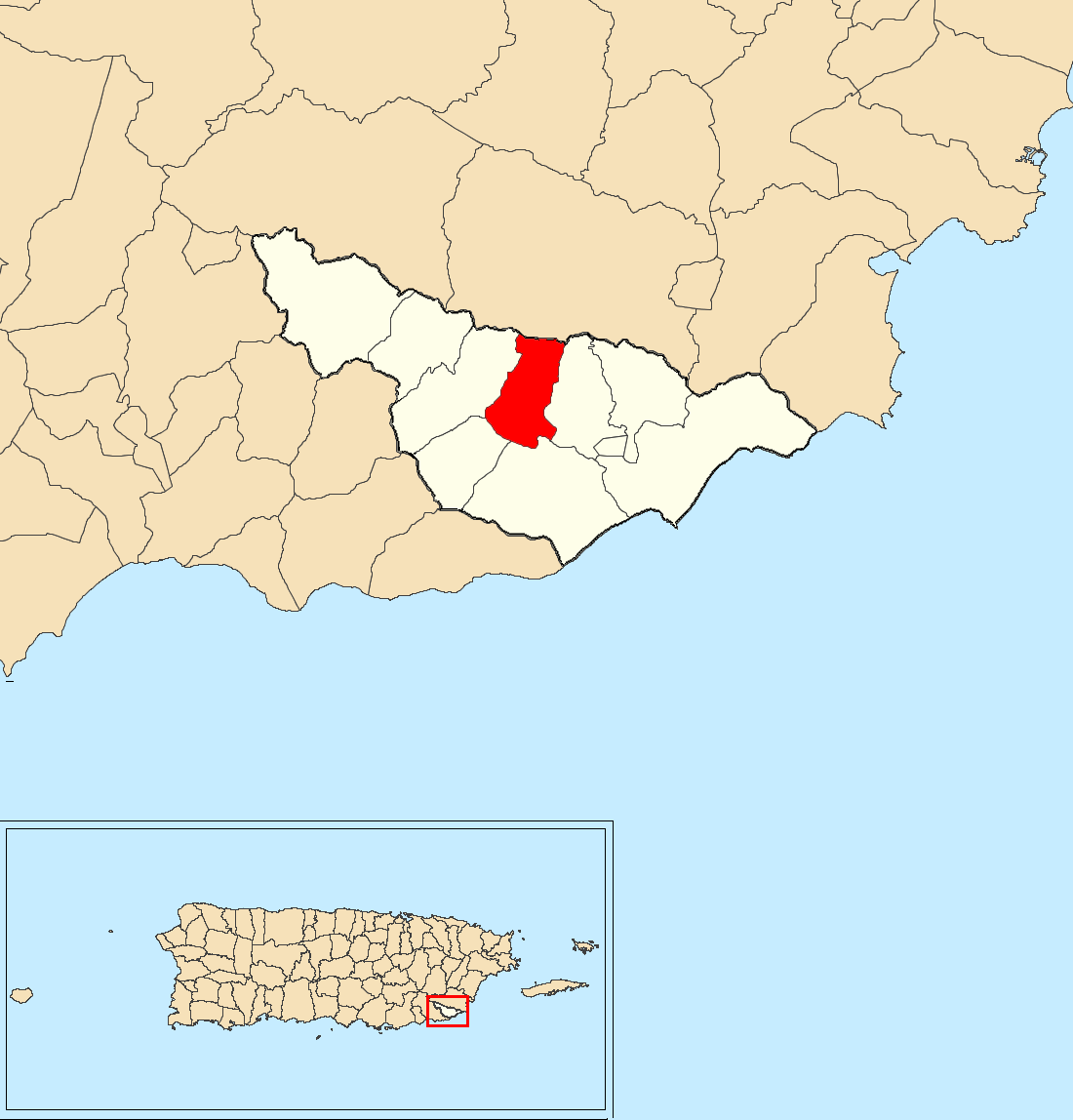
- Location of Tumbao within the municipality of Maunabo shown in red

- Location of Puerto Rico
- Coordinates: 18°01′15″N 65°55′16″W
- Commonwealth: Puerto Rico
- Municipality: Maunabo

Area
  - Total: 1.46 sq mi (3.8 km^{2})
  - Land: 1.46 sq mi (3.8 km^{2})
  - Water: 0 sq mi (0 km^{2})
- Elevation: 154 ft (47 m)

Population (2010)
  - Total: 593
  - Density: 406.2/sq mi (156.8/km^{2})
- Source: 2010 Census
- Time zone: UTC−4 (AST)
- ZIP Code: 00707
- Area code: 787/939

Tumbao is a barrio in the municipality of Maunabo, Puerto Rico. Its population in 2010 was 593. A new barrio, appearing in the 2010 census, Tumbao barrio was formed from part of Palo Seco barrio. Its population in 2010 was 593.

== See also ==
- List of communities in Puerto Rico
