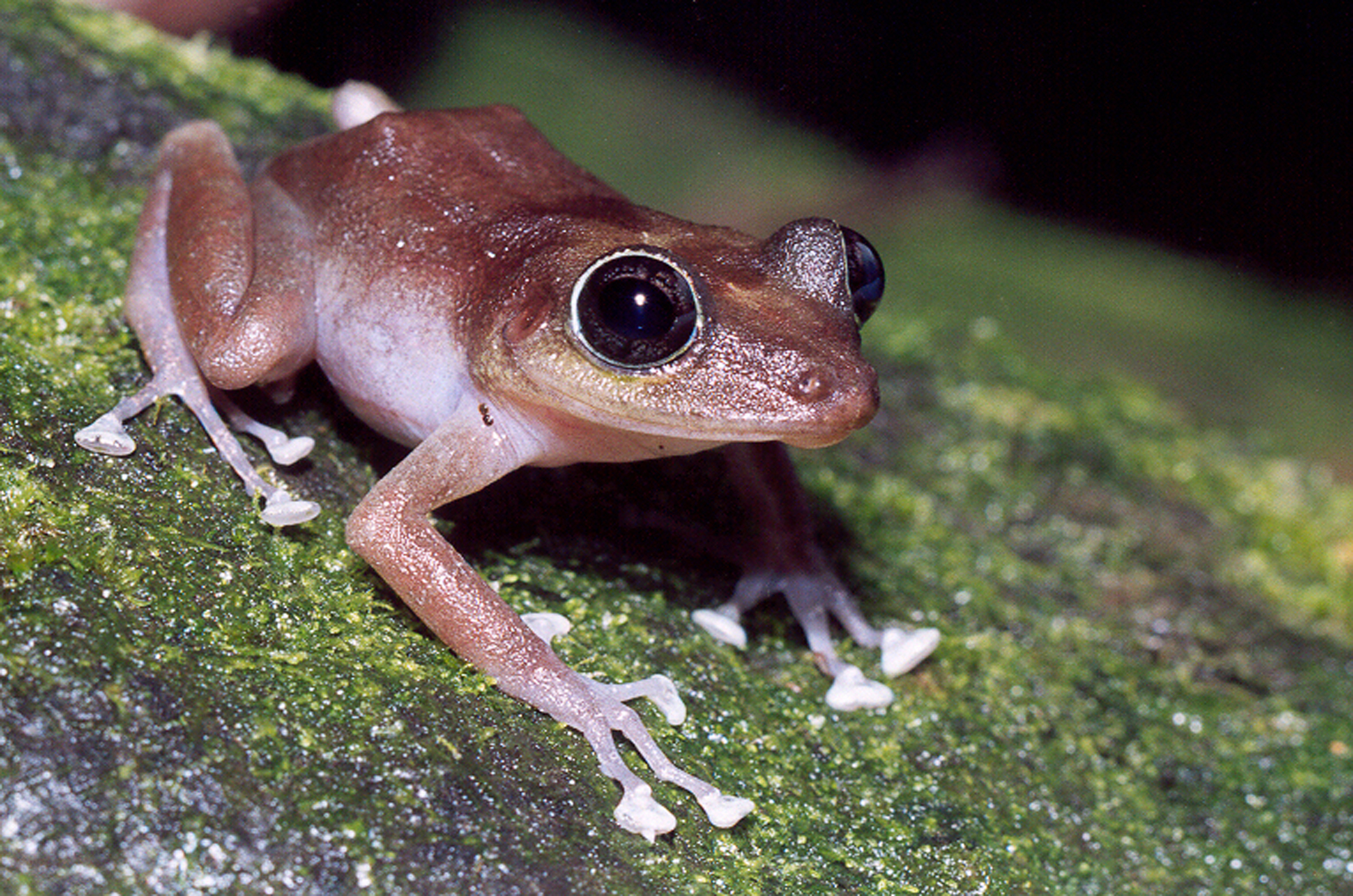
- Female Puerto Rican rock frog

Conservation status
- Endangered (IUCN 3.1)

Scientific classification
- Kingdom: Animalia
- Phylum: Chordata
- Class: Amphibia
- Order: Anura
- Family: Eleutherodactylidae
- Genus: Eleutherodactylus
- Subgenus: Eleutherodactylus
- Species: E. cooki

Binomial name
- Eleutherodactylus cooki Grant, 1932
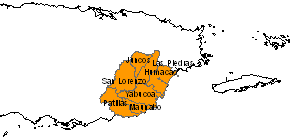
- Known habitat area, east Puerto Rico

= Puerto Rican rock frog =

Species of amphibian

The Puerto Rican rock frog (Eleutherodactylus cooki), also known as the Puerto Rican cave-dwelling frog or rock coquí, and locally as coquí guajón, or guajón for brevity, is a threatened frog species from the coqui genus. This unique species of tropical frogs dwells primarily in crevices and grottos in the Cuchilla de Panduras mountain range in southeastern Puerto Rico. The native name guajón is derived from its habitat, guajonales, which are caves formed by rock formations between huge stones. Despite being the state animal and considered emblematic of the region, of the 17 species of coquí, three are believed to be extinct and the rest are rare and declining in numbers. The Puerto Rican rock frog is extremely restricted in geographical distribution. The frog is threatened due to deforestation, agricultural, rural, and industrial development, and the associated infrastructure. It is sometimes called the "demon of Puerto Rico" (demonio de Puerto Rico in Spanish) because of its eerie call and phantom-like appearance. The species was first described by American herpetologist, Chapman Grant in 1932.

== Description ==
External audio
- The call of the Puerto Rican rock frog can be heard here.

Females are slightly larger than males, reaching a mean size of 2.01 in (51 mm) in length, whereas the males reach about 1.7 in. They are solid brown with whitish under parts, and large, white-rimmed eyes, giving them a phantom-like appearance. Breeding males and some females may have yellow throats and abdomens, and it is the only Eleutherodactylus species which exhibits sexual dimorphism in color and size. The species is characterized by large truncated discs under the frogs' feet, and a peculiar, melodious, low voice completely different from any other coquí in Puerto Rico.

== Taxonomy ==
The Puerto Rican rock frog is a petricolous (i.e., inhabits rocks) frog species endemic to the southeastern part of Puerto Rico. This species is one of 16 species of the genus Eleutherodactylus, commonly known as "coquíes" that inhabit the island. The phylogenetics relationships of frogs were established from the West Indies, using morphological characteristics belonging to Eleutherodactylus. Three groups or classes were recognized for the West Indies: E. inoptatus, E. ricordii, and E. unistrigatus. This species is a member of the West Indies subset of the E. unistrigatus group. The Puerto Rican rock frog is the second-largest species of Eleutherodactylus in Puerto Rico.

== Distribution and habitat ==
This species is restricted to the Cuchilla de Panduras mountain range (Maunabo, San Lorenzo, and Yabucoa), and in the municipalities of Patillas, Humacao, and Las Piedras in Puerto Rico. It occurs at low and intermediate elevations from 18 to 1,183 ft (361 m) above sea level, where they inhabit caves formed by large boulders of granite rock ("granodiorite", Geologic Map of the Yabucoa Quadrangle, USGS, 1977) known as guajonales or streams with patches of rocks without cave systems. It is believed to be limited in distribution by the rock formations where it occurs.

== Population trends ==
The hidden and complex habitats where the Puerto Rican rock frog occurs makes it difficult to study, so little detailed information is available about its population's status and distribution or the health of known populations. The species is extremely limited in geographic distribution and habitat requirements. Populations of species with a small range, or restricted to a specific habitat, are most susceptible to loss or depletions because of localized human activities that change their habitats. The habitat of this species is naturally fragmented, and the majority of the known populations are on private land, where increased levels of land development are occurring. The Puerto Rican rock frog is threatened by deforestation, construction and industrial development, runoff from the use of pesticides and fertilizers in agriculture, the use of caves as garbage dumps, and fire. It is a habitat specialist, meaning it is adapted to particular environmental conditions, and abrupt changes in these conditions could result in population declines.

== Status ==
The Puerto Rican rock frog was listed as threatened on June 11, 1997, pursuant to the Endangered Species Act of 1973, due to its restricted distribution, specialized habitat, and threats to that habitat. At the time, the US Fish and Wildlife Service determined designation of critical habitat not prudent. In 2003, the Center for Biological Diversity filed a lawsuit compelling the service to designate critical habitat and prepare a recovery plan for the species. The center secured a settlement agreement with the service, and the service published a final recovery plan for the species in 2004 and designated 260 acres (1.1 km^{2}) in Puerto Rico as critical habitat in 2007. This frog is also designated as vulnerable by the Puerto Rico Department of Natural and Environmental Resources, and is afforded protection by Commonwealth laws.
