= Matuyas Bajo =

Barrio of Maunabo, Puerto Rico

- Barrio
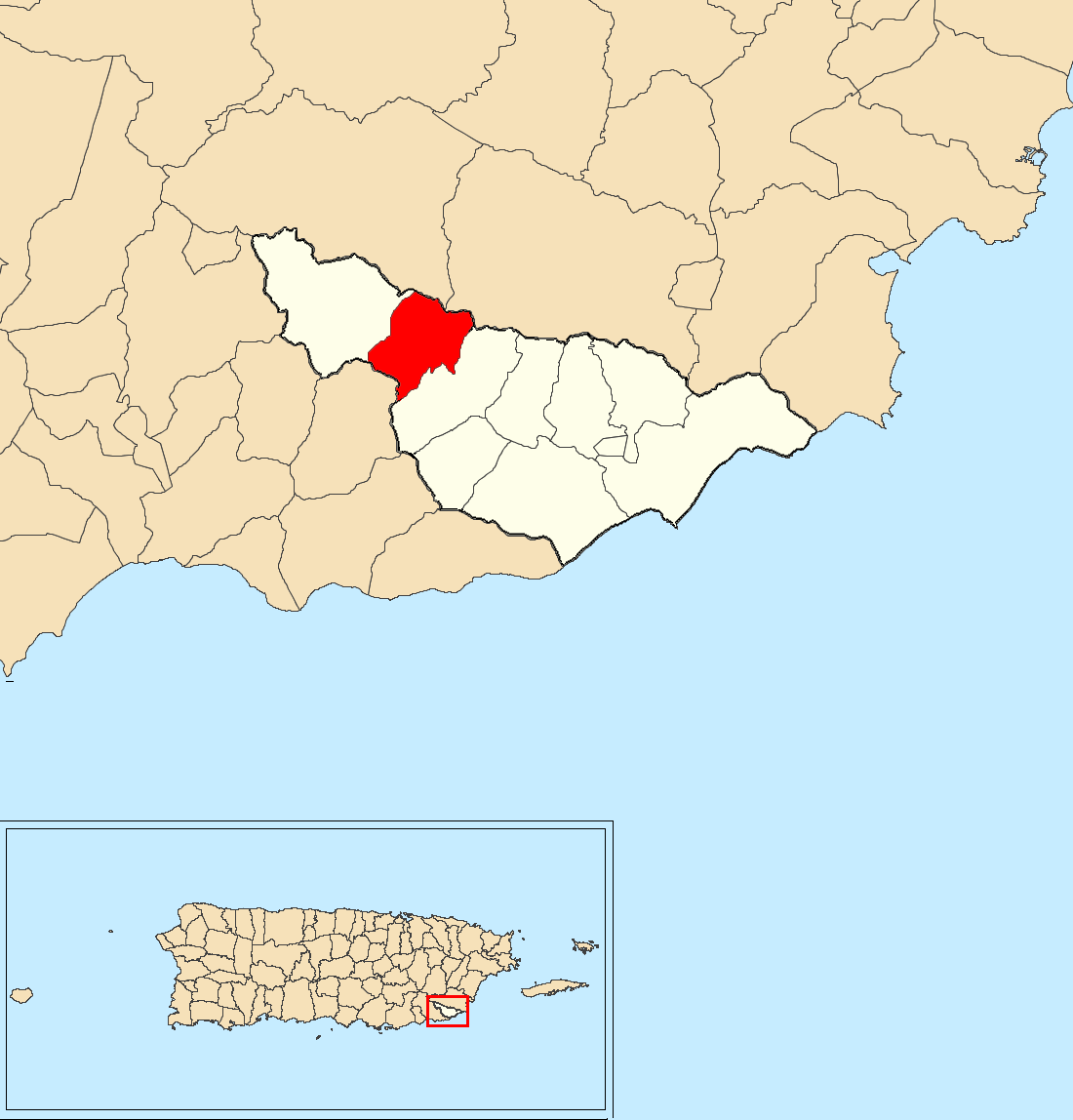
- Location of Matuyas Bajo within the municipality of Maunabo shown in red

- Location of Puerto Rico
- Coordinates: 18°02′00″N 65°56′51″W
- Commonwealth: Puerto Rico
- Municipality: Maunabo

Area
  - Total: 1.68 sq mi (4.4 km^{2})
  - Land: 1.68 sq mi (4.4 km^{2})
  - Water: 0 sq mi (0 km^{2})
- Elevation: 587 ft (179 m)

Population (2010)
  - Total: 327
  - Density: 194.6/sq mi (75.1/km^{2})
- Source: 2010 Census
- Time zone: UTC−4 (AST)
- ZIP Code: 00707
- Area code: 787/939

Matuyas Bajo is a barrio in the municipality of Maunabo, Puerto Rico. Its population in 2010 was 327.

== History ==
Matuyas Bajo was in Spain's gazetteers until Puerto Rico was ceded by Spain in the aftermath of the Spanish–American War under the terms of the Treaty of Paris of 1898 and became an unincorporated territory of the United States. In 1899, the United States Department of War conducted a census of Puerto Rico finding that the combined population of Matuyas Bajo and Matuyas Alto barrios was 941.

Historical population
Census	Pop.	Note	%±
1910	538		—
1920	590		9.7%
1930	647		9.7%
1940	602		−7.0%
1950	528		−12.3%
1960	574		8.7%
1970	374		−34.8%
1980	318		−15.0%
1990	397		24.8%
2000	274		−31.0%
2010	327		19.3%
U.S. Decennial Census; 1900 (N/A) 1910-1930; 1930-1950 1980-2000 2010

== See also ==
- List of communities in Puerto Rico
