= Calzada, Maunabo, Puerto Rico =

Barrio of Puerto Rico

Calzada
- Barrio
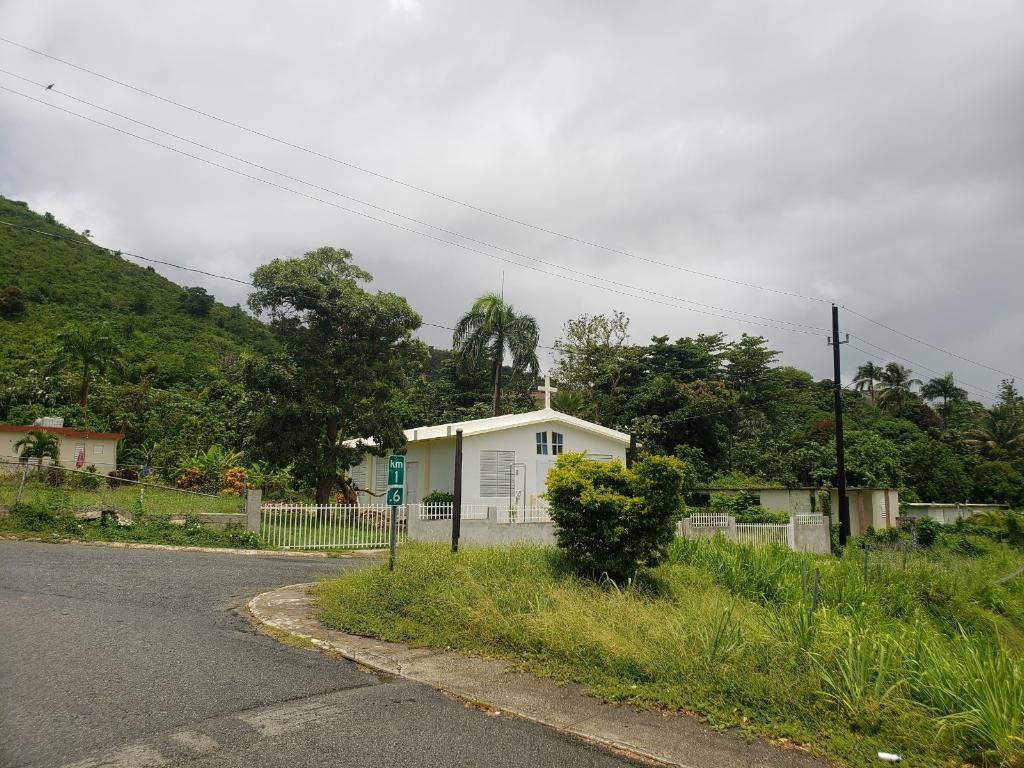
- Catholic chapel on PR-7761 in Calzada

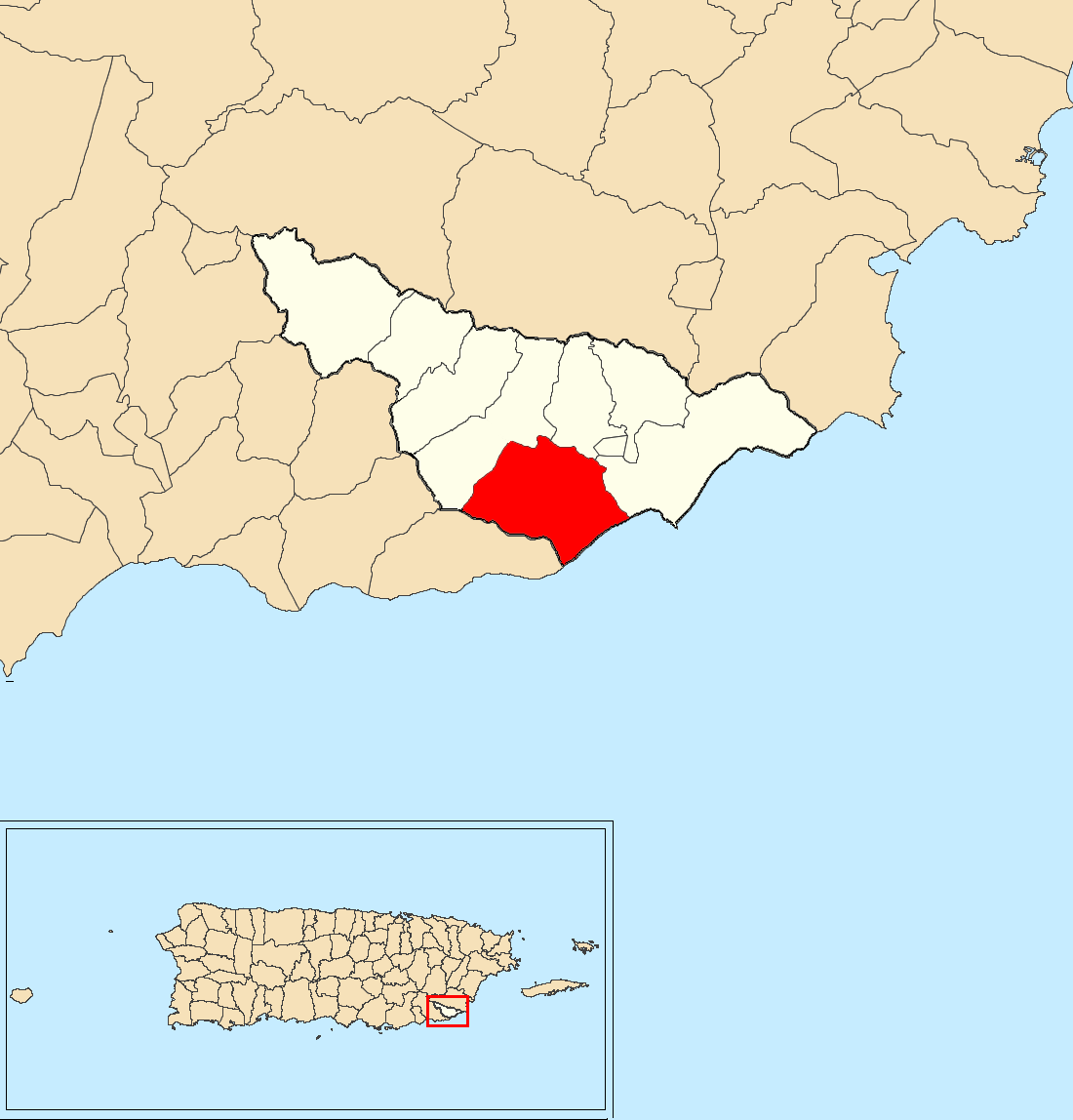
- Location of Calzada within the municipality of Maunabo shown in red

- Location of Puerto Rico
- Coordinates: 17°59′23″N 65°55′11″W
- Commonwealth: Puerto Rico
- Municipality: Maunabo

Area
  - Total: 3.78 sq mi (9.8 km^{2})
  - Land: 3.24 sq mi (8.4 km^{2})
  - Water: 0.54 sq mi (1.4 km^{2})
- Elevation: 112 ft (34 m)

Population (2010)
  - Total: 1,082
  - Density: 344.6/sq mi (133.1/km^{2})
- Source: 2010 Census
- Time zone: UTC−4 (AST)
- ZIP Code: 00707
- Area code: 787/939

Calzada is a barrio in the municipality of Maunabo, Puerto Rico. Its population in 2010 was 1,082.

== History ==
Calzada was in Spain's gazetteers until Puerto Rico was ceded by Spain in the aftermath of the Spanish–American War under the terms of the Treaty of Paris of 1898 and became an unincorporated territory of the United States. In 1899, the United States Department of War conducted a census of Puerto Rico finding that the combined population of Calzada and Lizas barrios was 1,233.

Historical population
Census	Pop.	Note	%±
1910	774		—
1920	905		16.9%
1930	1,191		31.6%
1940	1,422		19.4%
1950	1,486		4.5%
1960	1,453		−2.2%
1970	1,576		8.5%
1980	1,429		−9.3%
1990	1,369		−4.2%
2000	1,262		−7.8%
2010	1,082		−14.3%
U.S. Decennial Census; 1900 (N/A) 1910-1930; 1930-1950 1980-2000 2010

== Gallery ==
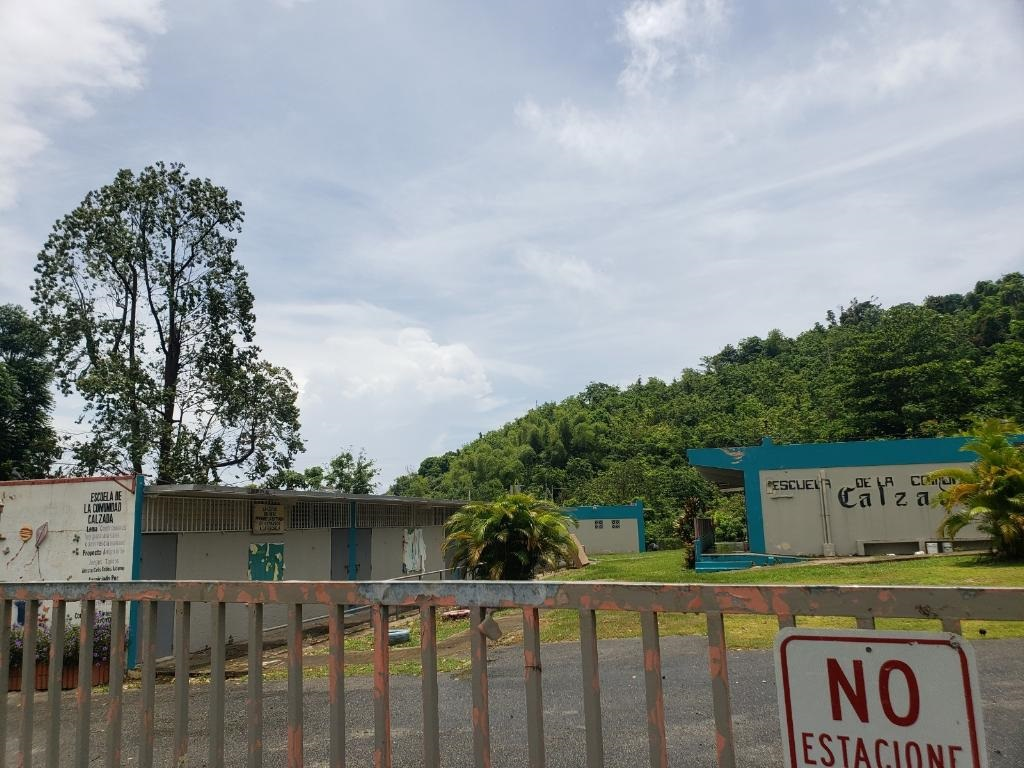
School in Calzada

== See also ==
- List of communities in Puerto Rico
