= Palo Seco, Maunabo, Puerto Rico =

Barrio of Puerto Rico

Palo Seco
- Barrio
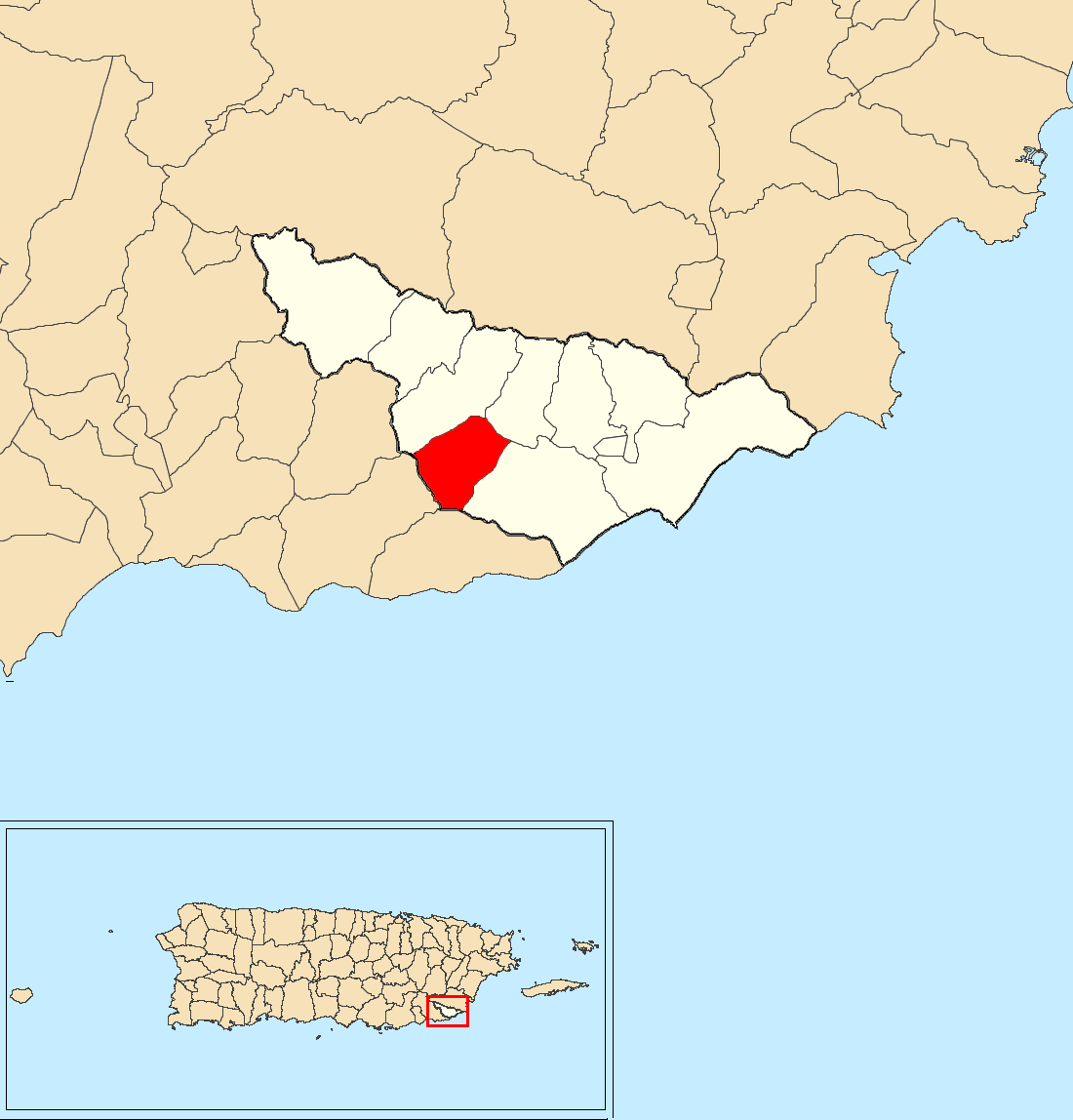
- Location of Palo Seco within the municipality of Maunabo shown in red

- Location of Puerto Rico
- Coordinates: 18°00′15″N 65°56′17″W
- Commonwealth: Puerto Rico
- Municipality: Maunabo

Area
  - Total: 1.4 sq mi (3.6 km^{2})
  - Land: 1.4 sq mi (3.6 km^{2})
  - Water: 0 sq mi (0 km^{2})
- Elevation: 197 ft (60 m)

Population (2010)
  - Total: 1,270
  - Density: 907.1/sq mi (350.2/km^{2})
- Source: 2010 Census
- Time zone: UTC−4 (AST)
- ZIP Code: 00707
- Area code: 787/939

Palo Seco is a barrio in the municipality of Maunabo, Puerto Rico. Its population in 2010 was 1,270.

== History ==
Palo Seco was in Spain's gazetteers until Puerto Rico was ceded by Spain in the aftermath of the Spanish–American War under the terms of the Treaty of Paris of 1898 and became an unincorporated territory of the United States. In 1899, the United States Department of War conducted a census of Puerto Rico finding that the population of Palo Seco barrio was 802. With the 2010 census, part of the Palo Seco barrio became Tumbao barrio.

Historical population
Census	Pop.	Note	%±
1900	802		—
1910	887		10.6%
1920	1,077		21.4%
1930	1,215		12.8%
1940	1,446		19.0%
1950	1,684		16.5%
1960	1,567		−6.9%
1970	1,876		19.7%
1980	1,925		2.6%
1990	2,032		5.6%
2000	1,849		−9.0%
2010	1,270		−31.3%
U.S. Decennial Census; 1899 (shown as 1900) 1910-1930; 1930-1950 1980-2000 2010

== See also ==
- List of communities in Puerto Rico
