= Palo Seco, Catamarca =

Municipality and town in Catamarca Province, Argentina

Coordinates: 26°47′S 66°04′W

Palo Seco
- Municipality and town
- Interactive map of Palo Seco
- Country: Argentina
- Province: Catamarca Province
- Time zone: UTC−3 (ART)

Palo Seco is a town and municipality in Catamarca Province in northwestern Argentina.
