= Maunabo, Puerto Rico =

Town and municipality in Puerto Rico

Maunabo Municipio Autónomo de Maunabo
- Town and Municipality
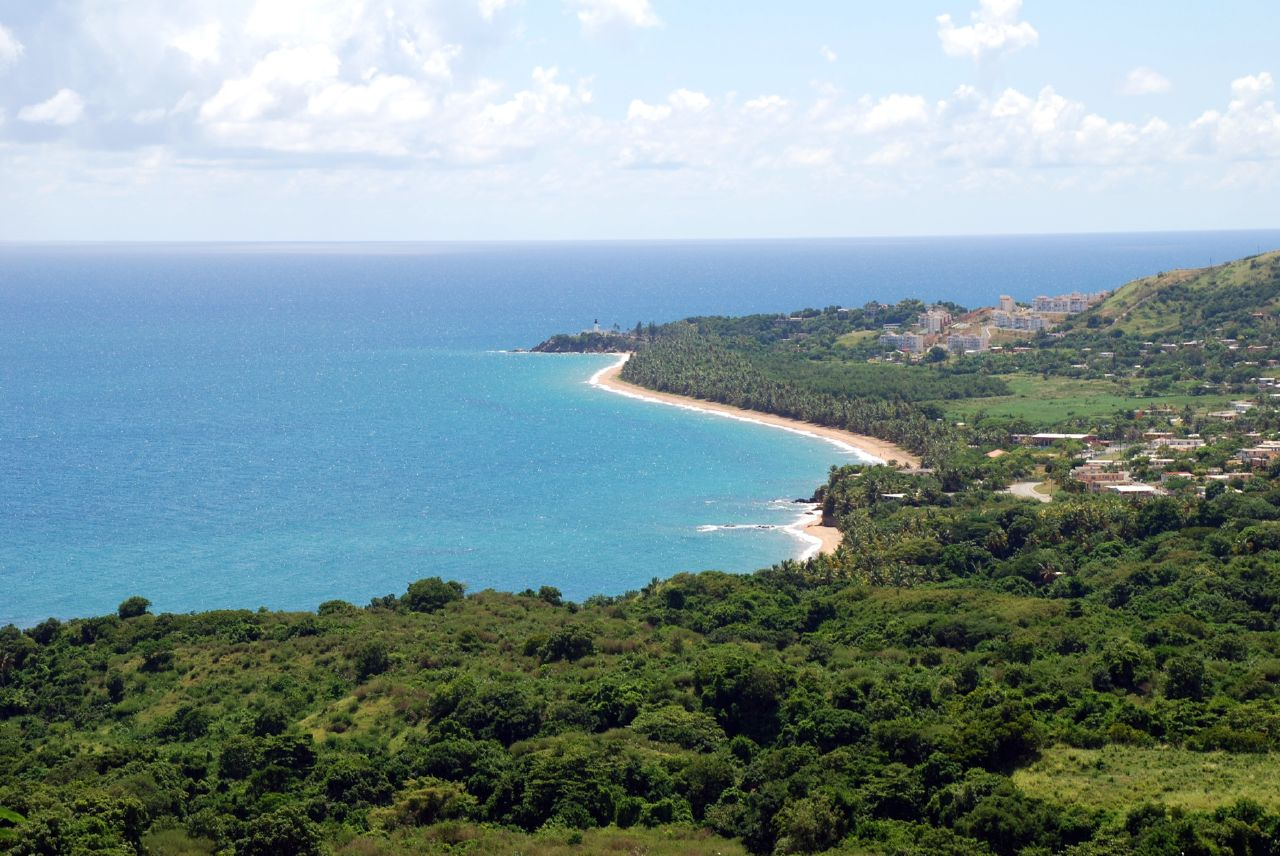
- Coastline of Maunabo

- Flag Coat of arms
- Nicknames: "La Ciudad Tranquila", "Los Jueyeros", "Los Come Jueyes"
- Anthem: "Maunabo pueblito del sureste de mi amada patria Borinquén"
- Map of Puerto Rico highlighting Maunabo Municipality
- Coordinates: 18°00′25″N 65°53′57″W
- Sovereign state: United States
- Commonwealth: Puerto Rico
- Founded: March 9, 1799
- Founder: Luis de Santiago
- Barrios: 10 barrios: Calzada; Emajagua; Lizas; Matuyas Alto; Matuyas Bajo; Maunabo barrio-pueblo; Palo Seco; Quebrada Arenas; Talante; Tumbao

Government
  - Mayor: Ángel Omar Lafuente Amaro (PNP)
  - Senatorial dist.: 7 - Humacao
  - Representative dist.: 34

Area
  - Total: 27.88 sq mi (72.21 km^{2})
  - Land: 21 sq mi (55 km^{2})
  - Water: 6.64 sq mi (17.21 km^{2})

Population (2020)
  - Total: 10,589
  - Estimate (2025): 10,120 ▼
  - Rank: 74th in Puerto Rico
  - Density: 500/sq mi (190/km^{2})
- Demonym: Maunabeños
- Time zone: UTC−4 (AST)
- ZIP Code: 00707
- Area code: 787/939
- Website: maunabomunicipio.com

Maunabo (Spanish pronunciation: [mawˈnaβo]) is a town and municipality of Puerto Rico located in the Maunabo Valley on the southeastern coast, northeast of Patillas and south of Yabucoa. Maunabo is spread over eight barrios and Maunabo Pueblo (the downtown area and the administrative center of the city). It is part of the San Juan-Caguas-Guaynabo Metropolitan Statistical Area. The population in 2020 was 10,589.

== History ==
Maunabo was founded in 1799. Maunabo derives its name from a Taino name Manatuabón for the Maunabo River.

Life in Maunabo was difficult for early settlers. In 1800 Maunabo registered a population of just 712 residents of whom 180 were slaves. The population was dedicated to subsistence farming in animal husbandry, minor fruits and crops for sustenance. The population was widely dispersed throughout the newly formed jurisdiction. The town center was just 4 hectares in area and consisted of 30 houses and 15 bohios according to an 1824 report to the Governor. Trade with neighboring towns along the southern coast of Puerto Rico and Saint Thomas was conducted through the port of Maunabo which was built in 1812. The wooden port facilities were primitive and frequently destroyed by tropical storms. Hurricanes Santa Ana in 1825 and San Jacinto in 1827 destroyed both agriculture and the housing stock. In addition the population faced periods of drought and the spread of communicable diseases such as smallpox. One early institution the Church of San Isidro Labrador y Santa Maria de la Cabeza was established in 1799. The Casa del Rey was the seat of municipal government. The leading landowners exercised political influence as mayors and counselors but the pace of economic development remained slow.

In the mid-nineteenth and early twentieth century Maunabo was a town heavily influenced by the development of the sugar industry. The three largest plantations were the haciendas Garonne, Bordelaise and Orleanaise. The names were French due to their founding by the Clauzel family and other French settlers to the region in the 1840s. The principal labor force of the early plantations consisted of enslaved Afro-Puerto Ricans. The population of enslaved people doubled as sugar lands were developed. By 1869 the slave register for compensation of the slaveowners at the time of abolition documented over 250 names of enslaved Afro-Puerto Ricans in Maunabo. Labor relations were characterized by intermittent conflicts and ongoing exploitation throughout the era of the sugar industry's rise. By the 1920s, the average wage of a cane cutter was approximately a dollar a day. The nineteenth century sugar planters were unable to modernize effectively due to a lack of available credit, international competition from the sugar beet industry, managing the transition from slavery to a wage labor system and the ever-increasing tariffs of the US market. The period from abolition (1873) to the Spanish American War (1898) marked a significant decline in the profitability of sugar. After the United States takeover in 1898 Maunabo experienced a period of record sugar production through the Great Depression.

In the wake of Hurricane San Ciriaco which destroyed the plantations in 1899 the owners of the three largest plantations decided to combine forces and develop a modern sugar factory, The Central Columbia Sugar Company (1901-1929). The factory site was 6.2 acres and located alongside the Maunabo River on land ceded to the new company by the Hacienda Garonne. Opened fully for business in 1901 the factory's first harvest was 20,000 sacks of sugar, the fifth highest total in the island. Thereafter the Columbia was a medium sized factory that served as an economic focal point for Maunabo but its growth was constrained by geography. Small and medium sized colonos were responsible for transporting clean sugars to the factory and paid a 5% charge for processing. The Central Columbia was destroyed by Hurricane Felipe on September 13, 1928 and thereafter the Maunabo sugars were processed at the Central Lafayette in Arroyo. The site of the factory was used as a trucking way station—the first large scale trucking operation in the Puerto Rican sugar industry—by the C& J Fantauzzi Company. After the sale of the factory and related lands to the Puerto Rican government in 1936, the site continued to be used as a way station for Maunabo sugar producers until 1974. Today the ruins of the Central Columbia are a notable landmark in Maunabo.

View of Maunabo about 1900

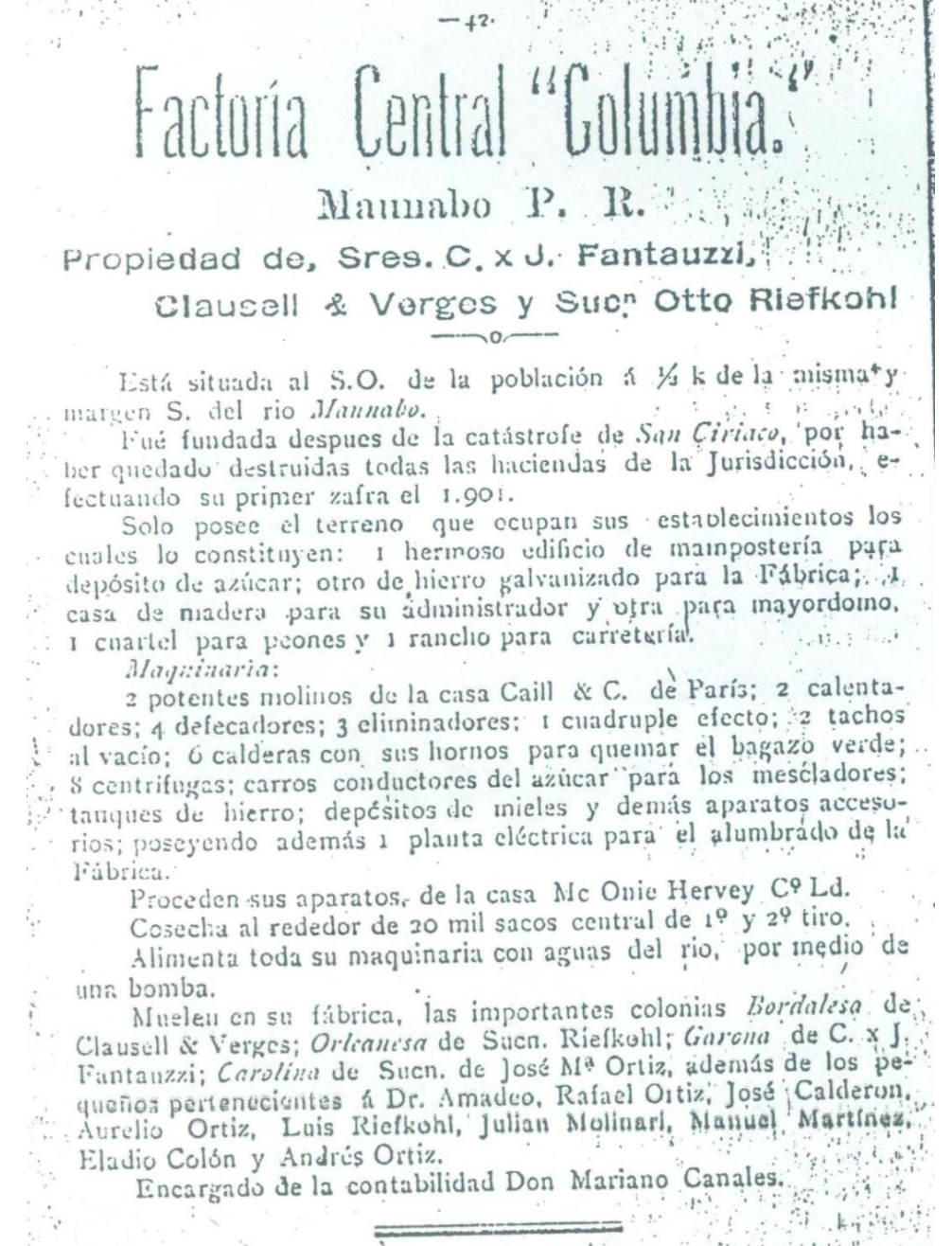
1902 Description of the Central Columbia Sugar Factory

Main Building of Central Columbia

Puerto Rico was ceded by Spain in the aftermath of the Spanish–American War under the terms of the Treaty of Paris of 1898 and became a territory of the United States. In 1899, the United States Department of War conducted a census of Puerto Rico finding that the population of Maunabo was 6,221.

Maunabo is known for its advances in media. Being almost "disconnected" from the rest of the island by its high mountains, the maunabeños created their own newspaper called La Esquina ("The Corner" in English) on August 30, 1975 by Ramón "Chito" Arroyo and José Orlando Rivera. It started as a community one-sheeter distributed free of charge only in Maunabo, but its popularity was so overwhelming that a year later it was transformed into a monthly tabloid. Today, the paper still is free of charge, home delivering 40,000 copies not only in Maunabo but also in the southeastern towns of Guayama, Arroyo, Patillas, Yabucoa and Humacao, and read by more than 190,000 people. Recently, the paper opened its new offices in Maunabo where they also work on La Esquina Online and other projects.

On September 20, 2017 Hurricane Maria struck Puerto Rico. The hurricane triggered numerous landslides in Maunabo with its 155 mph winds and rain. The electric company (Autoridad de Energía Eléctrica) stated restoring power to Maunabo could take up to 9 months. The mayor said all small businesses were affected and all minor fruits were lost.

== Geography ==
Maunabo is surrounded by high mountains on two sides. The three major peaks are Pico Hutton on Sierra de Guardarraya with an elevation of 1,799 feet (548 m); Cerro Santa Elena also known as El Sombrerito (the "little hat" for its unusual shape) on Sierra Pandura with an elevation of 1,722 feet (525 m); and Cerro de la Pandura with an elevation of 1,692 feet (516 m). The wind on these high points is so strong that it is hard to hear anything else but it blowing past your ears. At Sierra Guardarraya the strong winds have affected the growth of vegetation and the tall grass only grows flat to the ground.

In the lush and tropical vegetation of Cerro de la Pandura you will find one of the Island's most endangered species of coquí. Known as the coquí Guajón (Eleutherodactylus cooki), this coquí frog can be found in the mountains shared by the neighboring municipalities of Yabucoa, Patillas and San Lorenzo. Though discovered in 1932 by Chapman Grant of the U.S. Army, it was not until 1997 that the U.S. Fish and Wildlife Service declared it an endangered species.

=== Barrios ===
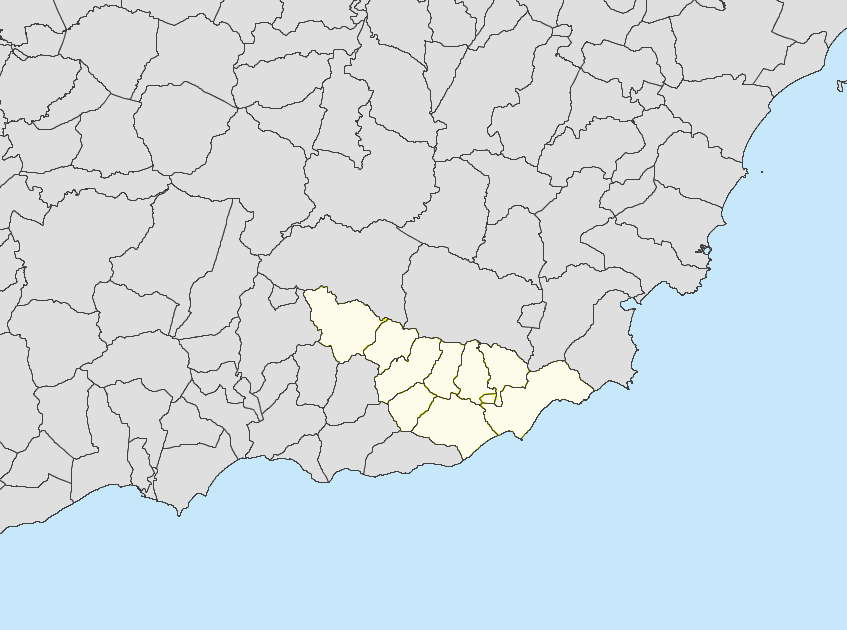
Subdivisions of Maunabo.

Like all municipalities of Puerto Rico, Maunabo is subdivided into barrios. The municipal buildings, central square and large Catholic church are located in a barrio referred to as "el pueblo".

1. Calzada
2. Emajagua
3. Lizas
4. Matuyas Alto
5. Matuyas Bajo
6. Maunabo barrio-pueblo
7. Palo Seco
8. Quebrada Arenas
9. Talante
10. Tumbao

=== Sectors ===
Barrios (which are like minor civil divisions) and subbarrios, are further subdivided into smaller areas called sectores (sectors in English). The types of sectores may vary, from normally sector to urbanización to reparto to barriada to residencial, among others.

=== Special Communities ===
Comunidades Especiales de Puerto Rico (Special Communities of Puerto Rico) are marginalized communities whose citizens are experiencing a certain amount of social exclusion. A map shows these communities occur in nearly every municipality of the commonwealth. Of the 742 places that were on the list in 2014, the following barrios, communities, sectors, or neighborhoods were in Maunabo: Matuyas, Sector García in Talante, and Batey Columbia in Calzada.

== Demographics ==
Historical population
Census	Pop.	Note	%±
1900	6,221		—
1910	7,106		14.2%
1920	7,973		12.2%
1930	9,084		13.9%
1940	10,792		18.8%
1950	11,758		9.0%
1960	10,785		−8.3%
1970	10,792		0.1%
1980	11,813		9.5%
1990	12,347		4.5%
2000	12,741		3.2%
2010	12,225		−4.0%
2020	10,589		−13.4%
2025 (est.)	10,120	▼	−4.4%
U.S. Decennial Census; 1899 (shown as 1900) 1910-1930; 1930-1950 1960-2000 2010 2020

== Tourism ==
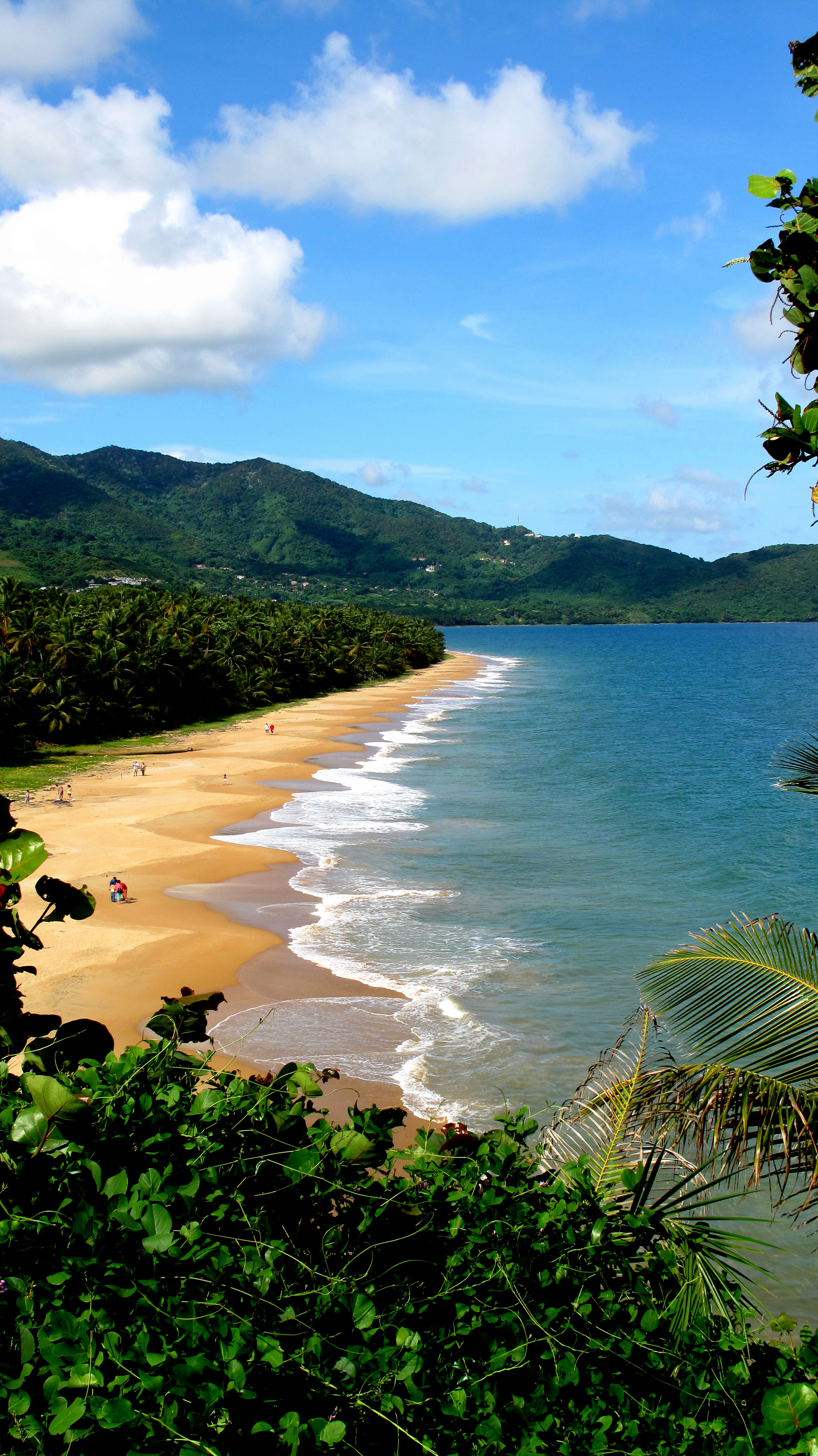
Landscape and shore of Maunabo

Mauna Caribe, a parador (type of locally operated inn or bed-and-breakfast), is located in Maunabo. The municipality's mountainous geography has contributed to its relative isolation from other parts of Puerto Rico, and it has comparatively limited large-scale commercial development.

The warm, unspoiled and untamed blue and green waters of the beaches of Maunabo are one of its major attractions. The three beaches (Los Bohios, Los Pinos and Playa Punta Tuna) are mostly visited by the locals all year round. The beaches also attract tourists that explore other regions beyond San Juan and other major cities. Surfers love these wild and dangerous waters. The Punta Tuna beach is also known by the locals as Playa Escondida or the "hidden beach", crowned by the Punta Tuna Lighthouse on one side and separated from the main road by lush sea grape trees on the other. The beach is only accessible by foot through a short dusty road.

The sand at Los Pinos Beach (the name means "the pines" and it comes from a pine-tree-lined hill on the side of the beach) shines with black carbon minerals and legend has it that these come from sea volcanoes or from underwater fossil fuel deposits. The minerals tend to stick to anything that is wet and thus it is rarely visited.

The Los Bohios Beach is another popular beach in the municipality, attracting thousands of visitors each year.

The town is also known for its Punta Tuna Lighthouse built by the Spanish at the end of the 19th century before the Island was turned over to the United States as spoils of the Spanish–American War of 1898. Though it has never ceased working under the active management of the U.S. Coast Guard, for almost 30 years the lighthouse was not accessible to the public. Due to Law 180 presented by Governor Aníbal Acevedo Vilá, the doors of the lighthouse were opened once again to the public in February 2006. The lighthouse is also a permanent symbol in the town's coat of arms.

The town is also known for its annual crab carnival "Festi-Carnaval Jueyero" which attracts thousands of visitors for a three-day celebration with live music, street fairs, contests and much crab-based food. The carnival is celebrated during the first week of September, at the peak of the summer heat.

=== Landmarks and places of interest ===
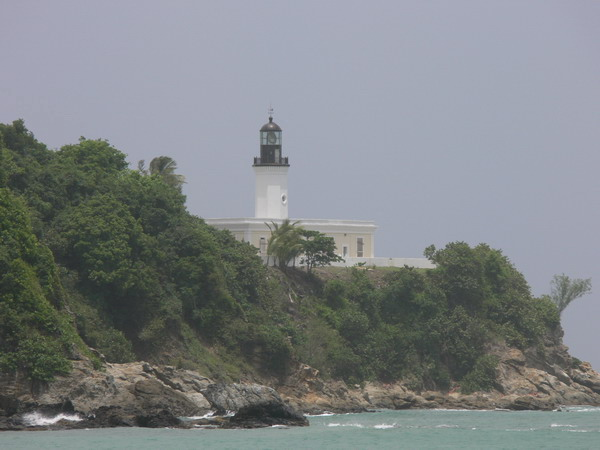
Faro Punto de Tuna

- Cantera Caverns
- Punta Tuna Light - built by the Spaniards in 1892 is located on Punta Tuna.
- Punta Tuna Beach
- Sierra Pandura
- The ruins of the Central Columbia sugar factory

== Culture ==
=== Festivals and events ===
Maunabo celebrates its patron saint festival in May. The Fiestas Patronales San Pedro y San Isidro Labrador is a religious and cultural celebration that generally features parades, games, artisans, amusement rides, regional food, and live entertainment.

Other festivals and events celebrated in Maunabo include:

- Gifts on the eve of Three Kings Day (Entrega de Regalos en la Víspera de Reyes)– January
- Isidore, the Farmer Community Festival (Festival Comunitario San Isidro Labrador) – May
- Town Festival (Fiestas de Pueblo) – June/July
- Festival of Our Lady of Mount Carmel (Fiesta del Carmen) – July
- Night Out (Noche de Afuera) – August
- Land Crab Festival and Carnival (Festi- carnaval Jueyero) – September
- Christmas Party at Calle 3 (Palo Seco) (Fiestón Navideño en la Calle 3 (Palo Seco)) – December
- Aníbal Arroyo Cup (basketball event) (Copa Aníbal Arroyo (evento de baloncesto)) – December
- End of Year Marathon (Maratón Año Viejo) – December 31

== Economy ==
Comité Pro Desarrollo de Maunabo (The Committee for the Development of Maunabo) has been active for years and in 2018 worked on upgrades to Casa Verde, a hurricane relief location in Maunabo.

=== Agriculture ===
- Fruits and vegetables; cattle.

=== Industry ===
- Fishing, guitar strings, plantain.

== Government ==
Like all municipalities in Puerto Rico, Maunabo is administered by a mayor. The current mayor is Ángel Omar Lafuente Amaro, from the New Progressive Party (PNP). Lafuente Amaro was first elected at the 2020 general election.

The city belongs to the Puerto Rico Senatorial district VII, which is represented by two Senators. In 2024, Wanda Soto Tolentino and Luis Daniel Colón La Santa were elected as District Senators.

== Symbols ==
The municipio has an official flag and coat of arms.

=== Flag ===
Maunabo's flag consists of a green cloth crossed diagonally by a white stripe. In each corner of the two remaining green triangles, there are two yellow ox yokes.

=== Coat of arms ===
This municipality has a coat of arms. Silver and green are the main colors of the shield, representing flowered sugarcane. The upside down V symbolizes the mountains of Maunabo: Sierra de Guarderraya and Sierra de la Pandura. A lighthouse is a representation of Maunabo's oldest building, which is located on the Maunabo coast. The yokes are symbols of agriculture and Maunabo's patron saint, San Isidro Labrador.

== Transportation ==
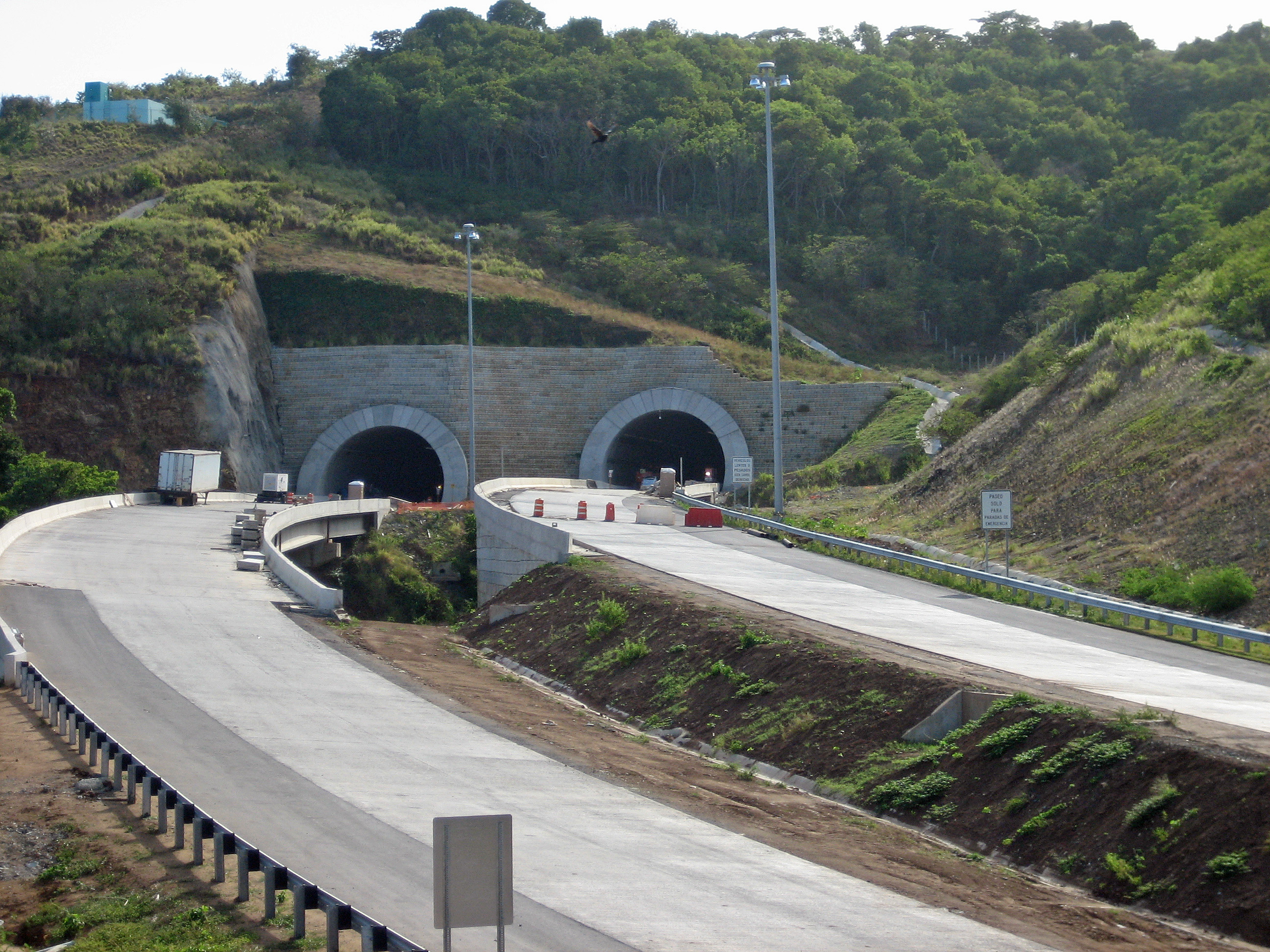
Tunnel under construction, 2008

The town constructed a tunnel which goes under a mountain, in this case, the eastern side mountains, (there is a vehicular tunnel that was built previously, in San Juan, the Minillas Tunnel, but that one goes under some buildings instead) connecting it with the neighboring town of Yabucoa. A Chilean construction company is in charge of the contract. The tunnels have been named Vicente Morales Lebrón, after an environmental activist who, as a result of the 1956 tropical storm Betsy that damaged the only road that connected the town with the north side of the island, proposed the tunnels to be built. In September 2018, the tunnel was closed briefly for the filming of a music video.

There are 22 bridges in Maunabo.

== Gallery ==
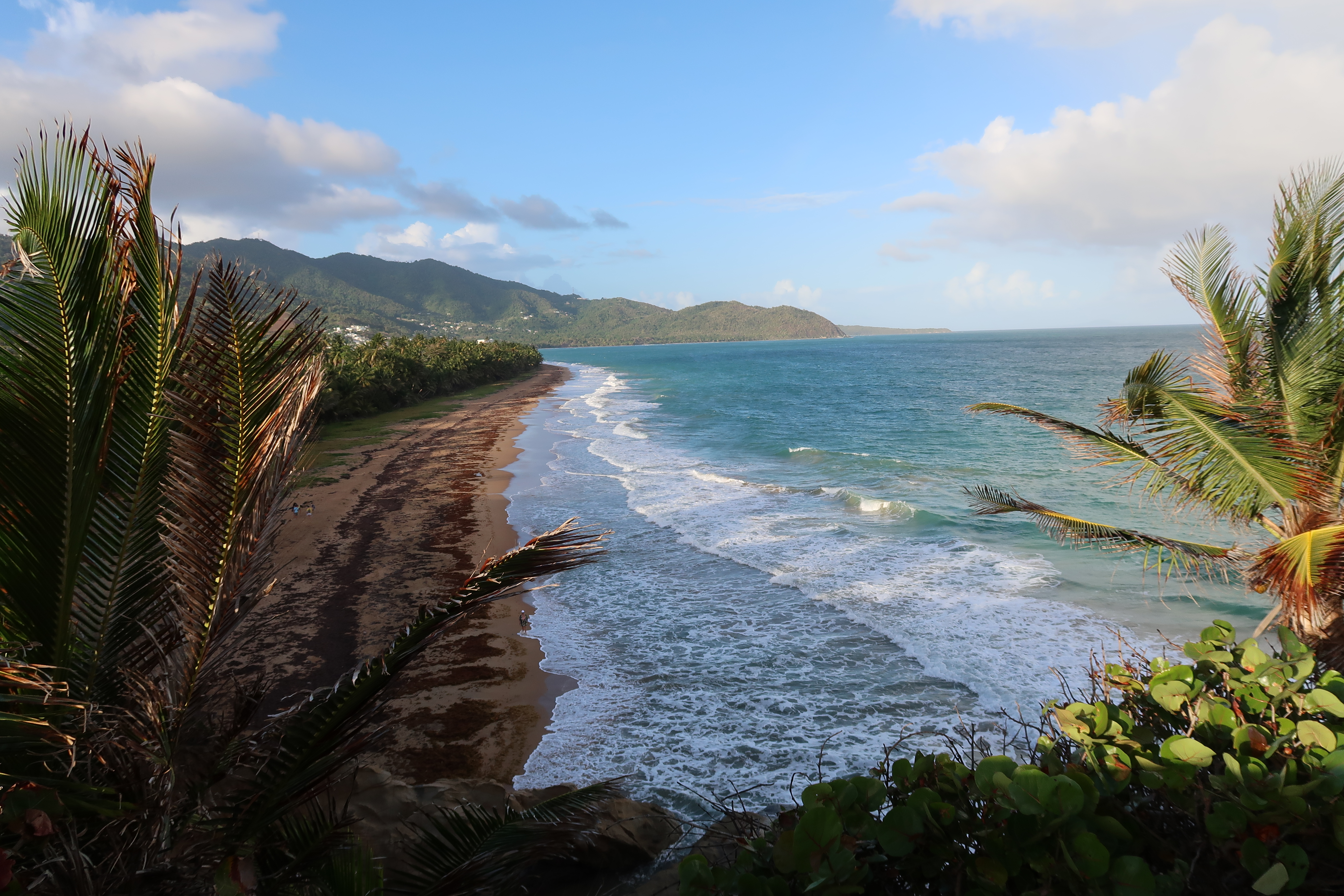
Punta Tuna Beach from Punta Tuna Lighthouse

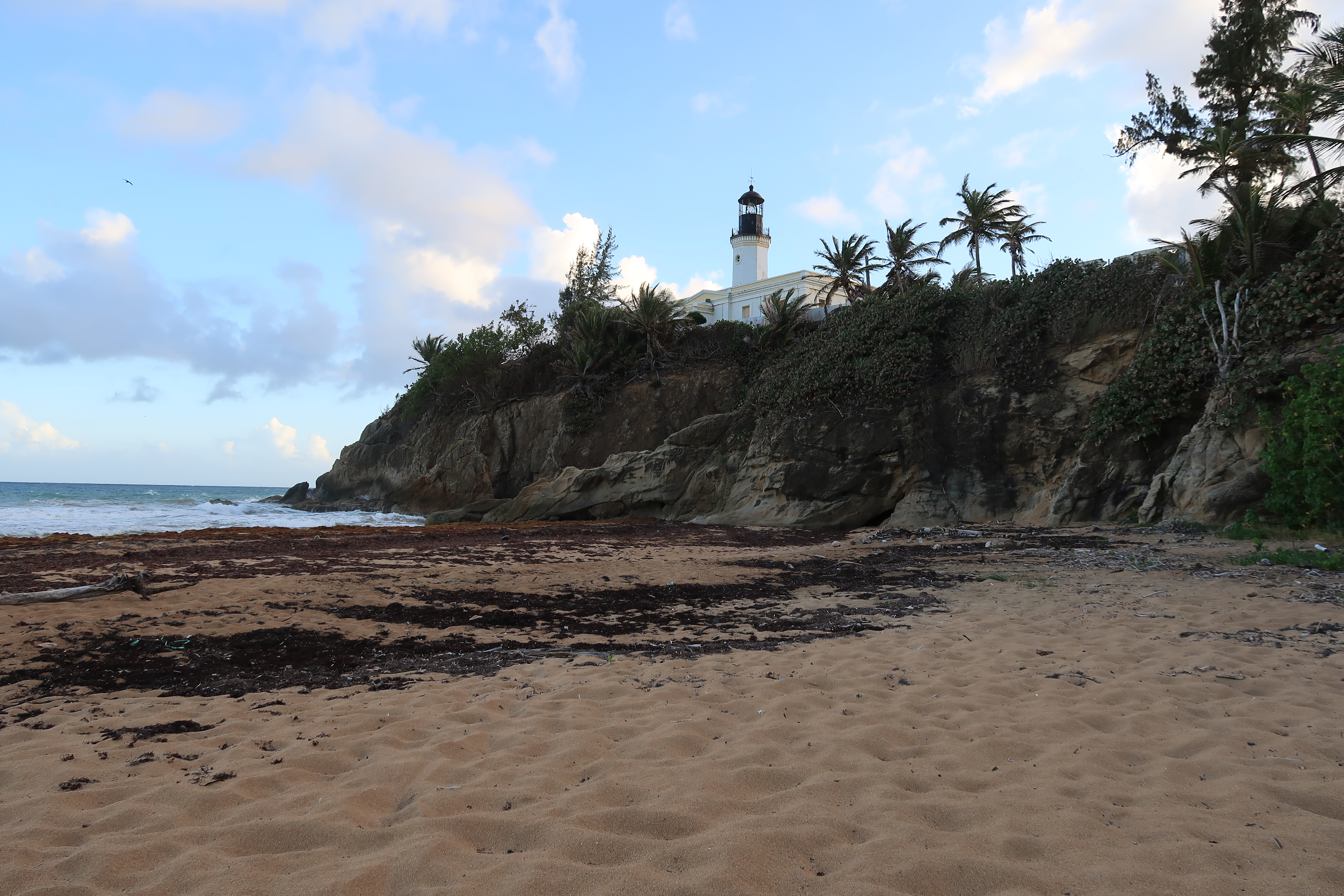
Punta Tuna Lighthouse at Punta Tuna Beach

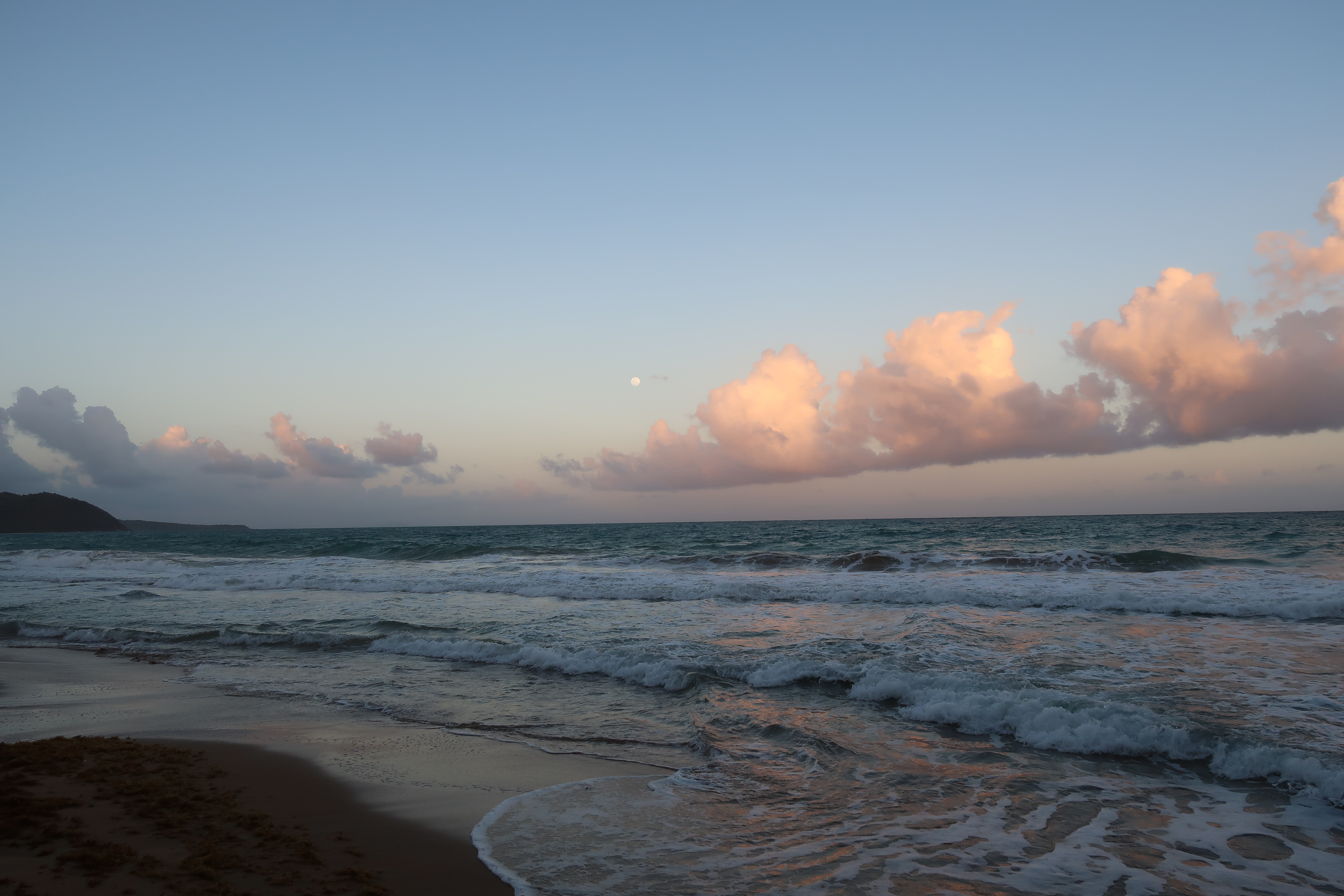
Punta Tuna Beach sky

== Notable residents ==
- Zahimara Fantauzzi (born 1993), footballer member of the Puerto Rico women's national team
- Heliot Ramos (born 1999), baseball left fielder for the New York Yankees
- Rudolph W. Riefkohl (born 1895), Colonel United States Army 1911-1945
- Frederick L. Riefkohl (born 1889), Rear Admiral United States Navy 1912-1947

== See also ==
- List of Puerto Ricans
- History of Puerto Rico
- Did you know-Puerto Rico?
