= 2013 Little League Softball World Series qualification =

All the qualified teams qualify for the 2013 Little League Softball World Series in Portland, Oregon

== Qualified teams ==
| Region | Location | Little League |
|---|---|---|
| Central | Elyria, Ohio | Elyria East Little League |
| East | Robbinsville, New Jersey | Robbinsville Little League |
| Southeast | McLean, Virginia | McLean Little League |
| Southwest | Robinson, Texas | Robinson Little League |
| West | Tucson, Arizona | Sunnyside Little League |
| Oregon D4 | Tualatin, Oregon | Tualatin City Little League |
| Asia-Pacific | Iloilo, Philippines | Iloilo Little League |
| Canada | (Canada) Victoria, British Columbia | Hampton Little League |
| Europe and Africa | Milan, Italy | Lombardia Little League |
| Latin America | Maunabo, Puerto Rico | ASOFEM Little League |

== United States ==
=== Central ===
The tournament took place in Indianapolis, Indiana from July 20–25.

Pool A
| State | City | Little League | Record |
|---|---|---|---|
| Michigan | Grand View | North Ottawa Youth Softball Association LL | 4-0 |
| Illinois | Freeport | Freeport LL | 3-1 |
| Wisconsin | Appleton | Appleton Einstein LL | 2-2 |
| Indiana | Madison County | Riverfield LL | 1-3 |
| Missouri | Webb City | Webb City Girls Softball LL | 0-4 |

Pool B
| State | City | Little League | Record |
|---|---|---|---|
| Ohio | Elyria | Elyria East LL | 3-0 |
| Iowa | Burlington | Burlington American LL | 2-1 |
| Nebraska | Omaha | Keystone/Benson LL | 1-2 |
| Kentucky | Lebanon | Marion County LL | 0-3 |

Semifinals
A1 | Michigan | 4
B2 | Iowa | 3
B1 | Ohio | 17
A2 | Illinois | 2

Finals
A1 | Michigan | 5
B1 | Ohio | 9

=== East ===
The tournament took place in Bristol, Connecticut from July 19–26.

Mid Atlantic Pool
| State | City | Little League | Record |
|---|---|---|---|
| Pennsylvania | West Grove | Avon Grove LL | 4-0 |
| New Jersey | Robbinsville | Robbinsville LL | 3-1 |
| (New York (state)) New York | Staten Island | Mid Island LL | 2-2 |
| Maryland | Sharpsburg | Sharpsburg LL | 1-3 |
| Delaware | Seaford | Nanticoke LL | 0-4 |

New England Pool
| State | City | Little League | Record |
|---|---|---|---|
| Rhode Island | Cumberland | Cumberland National LL | 4-0 |
| Connecticut | Seymour | George J. Hummel LL | 3-1 |
| Maine | Scarborough | Scarborough LL | 2-2 |
| Massachusetts | Charlton | Charlton LL | 2-2 |
| Vermont | Bristol | Mount Abraham LL | 1-3 |
| New Hampshire | Derry | Derry American LL | 0-4 |

Quarterfinals
MA1 | Pennsylvania | 10
NE4 | Massachusetts | 0
MA2 | New Jersey | 11
NE3 | Maine | 0
NE1 | Rhode Island | 8
MA4 | Maryland | 14
NE2 | Connecticut | 0
MA3 | (New York (state)) New York | 3

Semifinals
MA1 | Pennsylvania | 3
MA2 | New Jersey | 7
MA4 | Maryland | 5
MA3 | (New York (state)) New York | 10

Finals
MA2 | New Jersey | 11
MA3 | (New York (state)) New York | 0

=== Southeast ===
The tournament took place in Warner Robins, Georgia from July 25–30.

Pool A
| State | City | Little League | Record |
|---|---|---|---|
| Georgia | Toccoa | Toccoa LL | 2-1 |
| Florida | Keystone | Keystone LL | 2-1 |
| South Carolina | Irmo | Irmo LL | 1-2 |
| North Carolina | Wilkes County | Wilkes County American LL | 1-2 |

Pool B
| State | City | Little League | Record |
|---|---|---|---|
| Tennessee | Morristown | Morristown LL | 3-0 |
| Virginia | McLean | McLean Softball LL | 2-1 |
| West Virginia | Ona/Huntington | Ona/Hite Saunders LL | 1-2 |
| Alabama | Sylacauga | Sylacouga Softball LL | 0-3 |

Semifinals
A1 | Georgia | 0
B2 | Virginia | 3
B1 | Tennessee | 6
A2 | Florida | 3

Finals
B2 | Virginia | 8
B1 | Tennessee | 0

=== Southwest ===
The tournament took place in Waco, Texas from July 25–30.

Teams
| State | City | Little League | Record |
|---|---|---|---|
| Texas East | Elgin | Elgin LL | 3-2 |
| Louisiana | Bossier City | Bossier LL | 1-2 |
| Texas West | Robinson | Robinson LL | 4-0 |
| Colorado | Fruita | Fruita LL | 0-2 |
| New Mexico | Bayard | Copper LL | 2-2 |
| Arkansas | Pine Bluff | Pine Bluff American/Eastern LL | 0-2 |

Upper round 1
Texas East | 10
Louisiana | 1
Texas West | 17
Colorado | 1
Lower round 1
Colorado | 0
New Mexico | 13
Louisiana | 12
Arkansas | 5

Upper round 2
New Mexico | 2
Texas East | 4
Arkansas | 1
Texas West | 16
Lower round 2
New Mexico | 5
Louisiana | 4

Upper final
Texas East | 5
Texas West | 6
Lower final
Texas East | 8
New Mexico | 3

Final
Texas West | 14
Texas East | 6

=== West ===
The tournament took place in San Bernardino from July 19–26.

Pool A
| State | City | Little League | Record |
|---|---|---|---|
| Southern California | Granada Hills | Granada Hills LL | 4-0 |
| Arizona | Tucson | Sunnyside LL | 3-1 |
| Utah | Enterprise | Enterprise LL | 2-2 |
| Northern California | Gilroy | Gilroy LL | 2-2 |
| Nevada | Sparks | Centennial LL | 1-3 |
| Hawaii | Kamuela | Gold Coast LL | 0-4 |

Pool B
| State | City | Little League | Record |
|---|---|---|---|
| Oregon | Portland | Portland/Powell/Taborvilla LL | 3-1 |
| (Washington (state)) Washington | Sammamish | Eastlake LL | 3-1 |
| Montana | Montana | Boulder Arrowhead/Big Sky LL | 3-1 |
| Alaska | Juneau | Gastineau Channel LL | 1-3 |
| Idaho | Lewiston | Lewiston LL | 0-4 |

Semifinals
A1 | Southern California | 4
B2 | (Washington (state)) Washington | 1
B1 | Oregon | 0
A2 | Arizona | 1

Finals
A1 | Southern California | 2
A2 | Arizona | 12

=== Oregon District #4 ===
The tournament took place in Portland, Oregon at Alpenrose Dairy from July 15–19.

Teams
| City | Little League | Record |
|---|---|---|
| (Oregon) Tualatin | Tualatin City LL | 3-0 |
| (Oregon) Portland | Southwest Portland LL | 2-1 |
| (Oregon) Beaverton | Willow Creek LL | 1-2 |
| (Oregon) Forest Grove | Forest Grove LL | 0-3 |

Semifinals
#1 | (Oregon) Tualatin City LL | 13
#4 | (Oregon) Forest Grove LL | 0
#2 | (Oregon) SW Portland LL | 15
#3 | (Oregon) Willow Creek LL | 9

Finals
#1 | (Oregon) Tualatin City LL | 11
#2 | (Oregon) SW Portland LL | 0

== International ==
=== Asia Pacific ===
The tournament took place in Philippines from July 1–5.

Teams
| Country | City | Little League | Record |
|---|---|---|---|
| Philippines | Iloilo | Iloilo LL | 3-0 |
| Indonesia | Jakarta | Jakarta LL | 0-3 |

| Game | Away | Score | Home | Score |
July 1
| 1 | Indonesia | 0 | Philippines | 23 |
July 2
| 2 | Indonesia | 6 | Philippines | 10 |
July 3
| 3 | Indonesia | 0 | Philippines | 10 |

=== Canada ===
The tournament took place in Victoria, British Columbia from August 1–5.

Teams
| County | City | Little League | Record |
|---|---|---|---|
| British Columbia | Hampton | Hampton LL | 2-0 |
| Host | Layritz | Layritz LL | 1-1 |
| Ontario | Windsor | Windsor South LL | 0-2 |

| Semifinal | | | Final |
| | | | 1 | #1 British Columbia | 14 |
| 2 | #2 Host | 12 | | #2 Host | 4 |
| 3 | #3 Ontario | 2 |

=== Europe and Africa ===
The tournament took place in Caronno Pertusella, Italy from July 10–15.

Teams
| Country | City | Little League | Record |
|---|---|---|---|
| Italy | Milan | Milano LL | 3-1 |
| Czech Republic | Prague | Prague LL | 2-2 |
| Italy | Reggio Emilia | Emilia LL | 2-2 |
| Germany/United States | Ramstein | KMC American LL | 2-2 |
| Netherlands | Rotterdam | Rotterdam LL | 1-3 |

| Finals |
| #1 | Italy | 4 |
| #2 | Czech Republic | 0 |

=== Latin America ===
The tournament took place in Maunabo, Puerto Rico from July 10–15.

Teams
| Country | City | Little League | Record |
|---|---|---|---|
| Puerto Rico | Maunabo | ASOFEM LL | 4–0 |
| Puerto Rico | San Lorenzo | Liga Samaritana de Softball Municipal | 1–3 |
| Curaçao | Willemstad | Zoraida Juliana LL | 1–3 |

| Finals |
| #1 | (Puerto Rico) Maunabo | 12 |
| #2 | (Puerto Rico) San Lorenzo | 4 |
