= Abati =

Abati is a surname. It was used by an ancient noble family of Florence.

Notable people with the surname include:

- Antonio Abati (died 1667), Italian poet
- Baldo Angelo Abati (sixteenth century), Italian naturalist
- Joaquín Abati (1865–1936), Spanish writer
- Joël Abati (born 1970), French handball player
- Megliore degli Abati (thirteenth century), Italian poet
- Niccolò dell'Abbate (1509 or 1512 – 1571), Italian painter
- Reuben Abati (born 1965), Nigerian newspaper columnist

== Other uses ==
- The Abati people, a fictional ethnic group in H. Rider Haggard's adventure novel Queen Sheba's Ring
- Abati, Iran, village
- Abatipoçanga, 16th-century Tamoio chief
- Marauna abati, species of beetle in the family Cerambycidae
