= Fort Bayard =

Fort Bayard may refer to:

- Fort-Bayard, the capital of Guangzhouwan; now the city of Zhanjiang in Guangdong province, China
- Fort Bayard, New Mexico, an unincorporated community, United States
- Fort Bayard Historic District, a frontier fort in New Mexico, United States
- Fort Bayard National Cemetery, at Fort Bayard, New Mexico, United States
- Fort Bayard (Washington, D.C.), a fort in Washington D.C., United States
