= 2014 Little League Softball World Series qualification =

United States
- Central Winner: Tallmadge, Ohio
- East Winner: Robbinsville, New Jersey
- Southeast Winner: (Georgia (U.S. state)) Columbus, Georgia
- Southwest Winner: Bossier City, Louisiana
- West Winner: Chico, California
- Oregon D4 Winner: Tualatin/Tigard, Oregon

International
- Asia-Pacific Winner: Iloilo, Philippines
- Canada Winner: (British Columbia) Hampton, Victoria
- Europe and Africa Winner: Prague, Czech Republic
- Latin America Winner: Maunabo, Puerto Rico

Tournaments

All the qualified teams, qualify for the 2014 Little League Softball World Series in Portland, Oregon.

== United States ==
=== Central ===
The tournament took place in Indianapolis, Indiana from July 19–24.

Teams
State	City	Little League	Record
Illinois	Melrose Park	Melrose Park LL	4–0
Missouri	Webb City	Webb City Girls Softball LL	3–1
Ohio	Tallmadge	Tallmadge LL	3–1
Nebraska	Omaha	Keystone LL	2–2
Iowa	Albia	Monroe County Softball LL	2–2
Indiana	Fort Wayne	Don Ayres Time Corners LL	2–2
Wisconsin	Franklin	Franklin LL	2–2
Kentucky	London	North Laurel LL	0–4
Michigan	Freeland	Freeland LL	0–4

Quarterfinals
4	Nebraska	1
5	Iowa	4
3	Ohio	8
6	Indiana	3

Semifinals
1	Illinois	0
5	Iowa	4
2	Missouri	0
3	Ohio	10 (F/4)

Finals
5	Iowa	1
3	Ohio	4

=== East ===
The tournament took place in Bristol, Connecticut from July 18–25.

New England Pool
State	City	Little League	Record
Connecticut	Seymour	George J Hummel LL	4–0
Massachusetts	Charlton	Charlton LL	3–1
Rhode Island	Cranston	Cranston National/Budlong LL	2–2
Maine	Scarborough	Scarborough LL	2–2
Vermont	Essex	Essex Softball LL	1–3
New Hampshire	Derry	Derry American LL	0–4

Mid-Atlantic Pool
State	City	Little League	Record
New Jersey	Robbinsville	Robbinsville LL	4–0
(New York (state)) New York	New City	New City LL	3–1
Pennsylvania	Exton	Exton LL	2–2
Delaware	Roxana	Lower Sussex LL	1–3
Maryland	Delmar	Delmar LL	0–4

Quarterfinals
MA1	New Jersey	10 (F/4)
NE4	Maine	0
MA2	(New York (state)) New York	3
NE3	Rhode Island	0
NE1	Connecticut	7
MA4	Delaware	4
NE2	Massachusetts	0
MA3	Pennsylvania	3

Semifinals
MA1	New Jersey	7
MA2	(New York (state)) New York	0
NE1	Connecticut	0
MA3	Pennsylvania	1

Finals
MA1	New Jersey	3
MA3	Pennsylvania	2

=== Southeast ===
The tournament took place in Warner Robins, Georgia from July 24–29.

Teams
State	City	Little League
Florida	St. Cloud	St. Cloud American/National LL
Georgia	Columbus	Pioneer LL
North Carolina	Pilot Mountain	East Surry LL
South Carolina	Irmo	Irmo LL
Tennessee	Clarksville	Clarksville National LL
Virginia	McLean	McLean Softball LL
West Virginia	Moorefield	Moorefield LL

Upper round 1	Upper round 2	Upper final	Final
–	North Carolina	0
1–0	Virginia	12
–	Virginia	13
–	South Carolina	0
2–0	Virginia	8
2–0	Tennessee	4
–	Tennessee	12
–	West Virginia	2
1–0	Tennessee	3
1–0	(Georgia (U.S. state)) Georgia	2
–	Florida	0
–	(Georgia (U.S. state)) Georgia	8
3–0	Virginia	6	2
4–1	(Georgia (U.S. state)) Georgia	7	8
Lower round 1	Lower round 2	Lower round 3	Lower final
1–1	Florida	3
0–1	West Virginia	1	0–1	North Carolina	1	3–1	(Georgia (U.S. state)) Georgia	5
0–1	Florida	2	2–1	Florida	1	2–1	Tennessee	4
2–1	(Georgia (U.S. state)) Georgia	6
0–1	South Carolina	5
1–1	(Georgia (U.S. state)) Georgia	10

=== Southwest ===
The tournament took place in Waco, Texas from July 26–30.

Teams
State	City	Little League
Arkansas	Malvern	Malvern LL
Colorado	Pueblo	Rawlins Softball LL
Louisiana	Bossier City	Bossier LL
New Mexico	Silver City	Silver City LL
Texas East	College Station	Bryan Hardy LL
Texas West	Robinson	Robinson LL

Upper round 1
–	Louisiana	17
–	Arkansas	1
–	New Mexico	0
–	Texas West	12
Lower round 1
0–1	New Mexico	11
0–1	Colorado	6
0–1	Arkansas	1
0–1	Texas East	16

Upper round 2
–	Colorado	0
1–0	Louisiana	11
–	Texas East	2
1–0	Texas West	5
Lower round 2
1–1	New Mexico	1
1–1	Texas East	8

Upper final
2–0	Louisiana	10
2–0	Texas West	6
Lower final
2–1	Texas West	15
2–1	Texas East	5

Final
3–0	Louisiana	7
3–1	Texas West	0

=== West ===
The tournament took place in San Bernardino from July 19–26.

Pool A
State	City	Little League	Record
Northern California	Chico	Chico Softball Black LL	4–0
Southern California	Quartz Hill	Quartz Hill LL	3–1
Arizona	Gilbert	Gilbert LL	2–2
Hawaii	Big Island	Gold Coast LL	2–2
Utah	Enterprise	Enterprise LL	1–3
Nevada	Sparks	Centennial LL	0–4

Pool B
State	City	Little League	Record
(Washington (state)) Washington	Gig Harbor	Gig Harbor American/National LL	4–0
Montana	Billings	Boulder Arrowhead/Big Sky LL	3–1
Oregon	Pendleton	Pendleton LL	2–2
Idaho	Lewiston	Lewiston LL	1–3
Alaska	Anchorage	Nunaka Valley LL	0–4

Semifinals
A1	Northern California	8
B2	Montana	1
B1	(Washington (state)) Washington	4
A2	Southern California	0

Finals
A1	Northern California	8
B1	(Washington (state)) Washington	4

=== Oregon District 4 ===
The tournament took place in Portland, Oregon at Alpenrose Dairy from July 15–19.

Teams
City	Little League	Record
(Oregon) Tigard/Tualatin	Tigard/Tualatin City LL	4–0
(Oregon) Beaverton	Murrayhill LL	3–1
(Oregon) Beaverton	Willow Creek LL	2–2
(Oregon) Banks	Banks LL	1–3
(Oregon) Portland	Southwest Portland LL	0–4

Semifinals
#1	(Oregon) Tigard/Tualatin City LL	W
#4	(Oregon) Banks LL	L
#2	(Oregon) Murrayhill LL	8
#3	(Oregon) Willow Creek LL	9

Finals
#1	(Oregon) Tigard/Tualatin City LL	3
#3	(Oregon) Willow Creek LL	0

== International ==
=== Asia Pacific ===
The tournament took place in Clark, Philippines from June 29–July 1.

Teams
Country	City	Little League	Record
Philippines	Iloilo	Iloilo LL	3-0
Australia			0-3

Game	Away	Score	Home	Score
June 29
1	Australia	0	Philippines	10
June 30
2	Australia	1	Philippines	17
July 1
3	Australia	0	Philippines	17

=== Canada ===
The tournament took place in Victoria, British Columbia from August 2–4.

Teams
County	City	Little League	Record
(British Columbia) Host	Hampton	Hampton LL	3–0
Ontario			0–3

Game	Away	Score	Home	Score
August 2
1	Ontario	1	(British Columbia) Host	15
August 3
2	Ontario	2	(British Columbia) Host	11
August 3
3	Ontario	0	(British Columbia) Host	15

=== Europe and Africa ===
The tournament took place in Kutno, Poland from July 24–27.

Teams
Country	City	Little League	Record
Czech Republic	Prague	Prague LL	3–1
Netherlands	Rotterdam	Rotterdam/Den Haag LL	2–2
Italy	Milano	Lombardia LL	1–3

Finals
1	Czech Republic	5
2	Netherlands	2

=== Latin America ===
The tournament took place in Maunabo, Puerto Rico from July 16–20.

Teams
Country	City	Little League	Record
Puerto Rico	Maunabo	ASOFEM LL	3–0
Mexico	Mexicali	Softbol Femenil Mexicali LL	2–1
Puerto Rico	Coamo	Liga Softball Femenino Coamo	0–4

Game 1
1	(Puerto Rico) Maunabo	7
2	Mexico	0

Game 2
1	(Puerto Rico) Maunabo	10
2	Mexico	1
