= John Schnitzer =

American soldier and wagoner in the U.S. Army

- Born: 1854; Kempten, Kingdom of Bavaria
- Died: October 26, 1904 (aged 50); Fort Bayard, New Mexico Territory, United States
- Burial place: Fort Bayard National Cemetery
- Military career
- Allegiance: United States of America
- Branch: United States Army
- Service years: 1882–1895, 1896–1904
- Rank: Sergeant
- Units: 4th U.S. Cavalry; 23rd U.S. Infantry
- Conflicts: Indian Wars; Apache Wars
- Awards: Medal of Honor

Sergeant John P. Schnitzer (1854 – October 26, 1904) was an American soldier and wagoner in the U.S. Army who served with both the 23rd U.S. Infantry and 6th U.S. Cavalry in the New Mexico Territory during the Apache Wars. He was awarded the Medal of Honor, along with First Lieutenant Wilber Wilder, for rescuing a fellow soldier under heavy fire while fighting the Apache at Horseshoe Canyon on April 23, 1882, which he received fourteen years later.

== Biography ==
John P. Schnitzer was born in Kempten, Bavaria in 1854. He later emigrated to the United States and lived in New York City, New York before joining the United States Army from St. Louis, Missouri in February 1882. Taking part in the military campaigns against the Plains Indians, he saw considerable action with the 4th U.S. Cavalry, in which he was also a wagoner for Troop G, during the Apache Wars in the New Mexico Territory. On April 23, 1882, his patrol came under attack by a hostile band of Apache Indians at Horseshoe Canyon. When one of his comrades, Private Edward Leonard, was wounded in the fight he and First Lieutenant Wilber Wilder risked their lives under heavy enemy fire to rescue him. Both men were awarded the Medal of Honor for their actions, Schnitzer being awarded his fourteen years after the incident.

On June 8, 1885, while serving with the 23rd U.S. Infantry Regiment, Schnitzer was again cited for heroism in a battle with the Chiricahua Apache in Guadeloupe Canyon on the New Mexico-Arizona territorial border. He and several other members of the 23rd Infantry's H Company were attacked while guarding a U.S. Army supply train. Three men were killed in the fighting and the Apache succeeded in seizing much ammunition and army rations. Schnitzer managed to escape carrying his mortally wounded sergeant out of the canyon while "under heavy fire within a short distance of the hostile Indians concealed in the rocks". Schnitzer remained in the New Mexico Territory until his death from tuberculosis at Fort Bayard on October 26, 1904, at the age 50. Some sources list his date of death as 1906, although the former date is on his tombstone. He and fellow Apache War veteran Alonzo Bowman are the only two MOH recipients buried at Fort Bayard National Cemetery.

== Medal of Honor citation ==
Rank and organization: Wagoner, Troop G, 4th U.S. Cavalry. Place and date: At Horseshoe Canyon, N. Mex., 23 April 1882. Entered service at:--. Birth: Bavaria. Date of issue: 17 August 1896.

Citation:

Assisted, under a heavy fire, to rescue a wounded comrade.

== See also ==
- List of Medal of Honor recipients for the Indian Wars
