= Neocorus zikani =

Scientific classification
- Kingdom: Animalia
- Phylum: Arthropoda
- Class: Insecta
- Order: Coleoptera
- Suborder: Polyphaga
- Infraorder: Cucujiformia
- Family: Cerambycidae
- Subfamily: Cerambycinae
- Tribe: Neocorini
- Genus: Neocorus
- Species: N. zikani

Binomial name
- Neocorus zikani Melzer, 1920

Synonyms
- Neocorus zikani Zikán & Wygodzinsky, 1948

Species of beetle

Neocorus zikani is a species in the longhorn beetle family Cerambycidae. It is found in Brazil and Uruguay.
