= New Mexico State Road 152 =

State highway in Grant and Sierra counties in New Mexico, United States

State Road 152

Route information
- Maintained by NMDOT
- Length: 66.067 mi (106.325 km)

Major junctions
- West end: US 180 in Santa Clara
- I-25 / US 85 near Caballo
- East end: NM 187 near Caballo

Location
- Country: United States
- State: New Mexico
- Counties: Grant, Sierra

Highway system
- New Mexico State Highway System; Interstate; US; State; Scenic
← NM 150	→ NM 153

State Road 152 (NM 152) is a 66.067-mile-long (106.325 km) state highway in the US state of New Mexico. NM 152's western terminus is in Santa Clara, at U.S. Route 180 (US 180) and NM 152's eastern terminus is at NM 187 south of Caballo.

== Route description ==
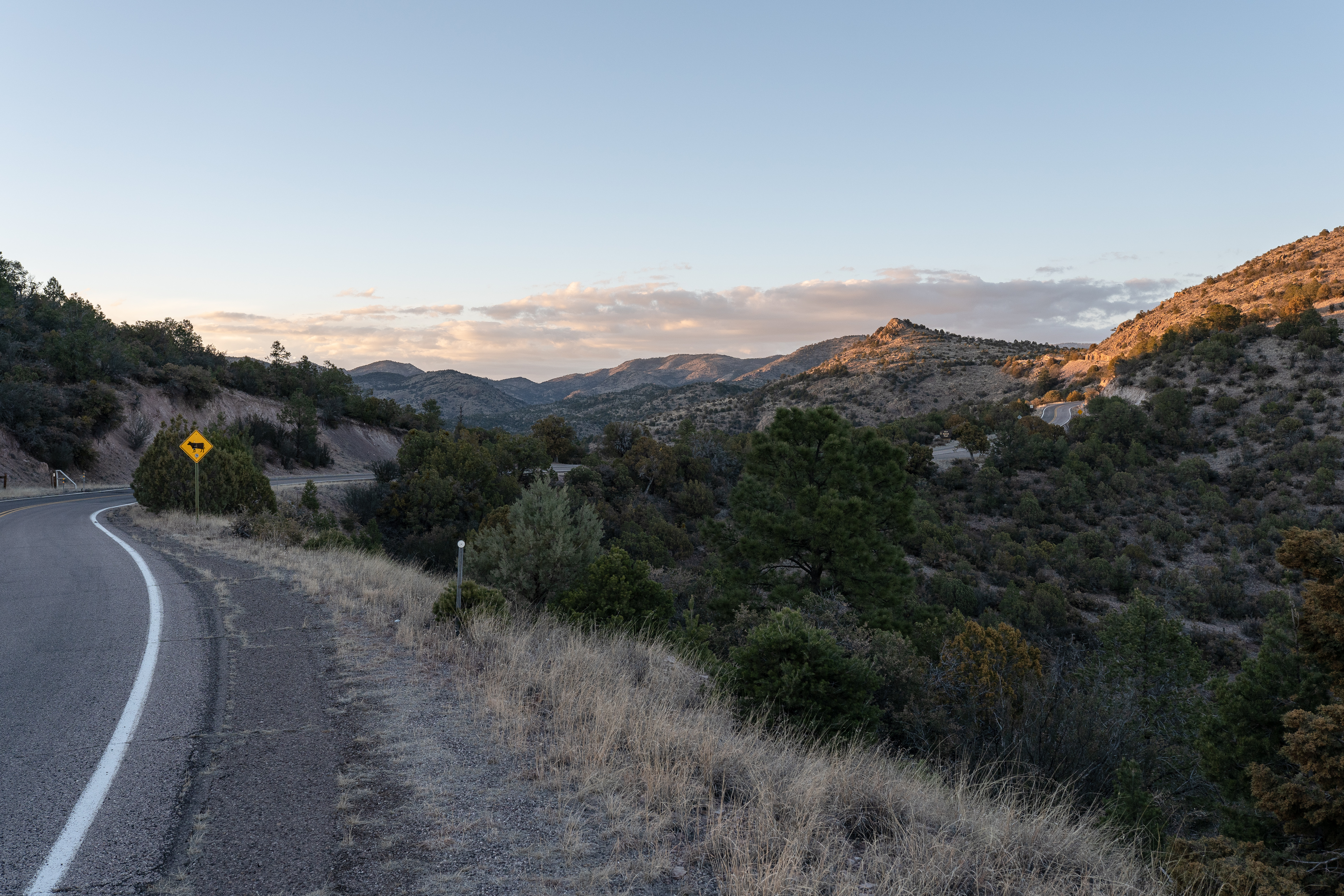
Looking north along New Mexico State Road 152 between San Lorenzo, NM and the Black Range of the Gila National Forest

NM 152 begins at an intersection with US 180 in Santa Clara and begins traveling east. It then intersects NM 356 in Hanover. Then roughly 10 miles (16 km) later it intersects NM 35 and then NM 61 in San Lorenzo. Then 32 miles (51 km) further eastward it intersects NM 27 in Hillsboro. 17 miles (27 km) past Hillsboro, NM 152 intersects I-25 and US 85 before reaching its eastern terminus as NM 187 south of Caballo.

== History ==
In 2014, NM 152 suffered significant damage from Hurricane Norbert, with portions of the road washed away and debris covering large stretches of road. Due to the severity of damage, the New Mexico Department of Transportation closed the road indefinitely and stated it could be more than a month until it was re-opened.

== Major intersections ==
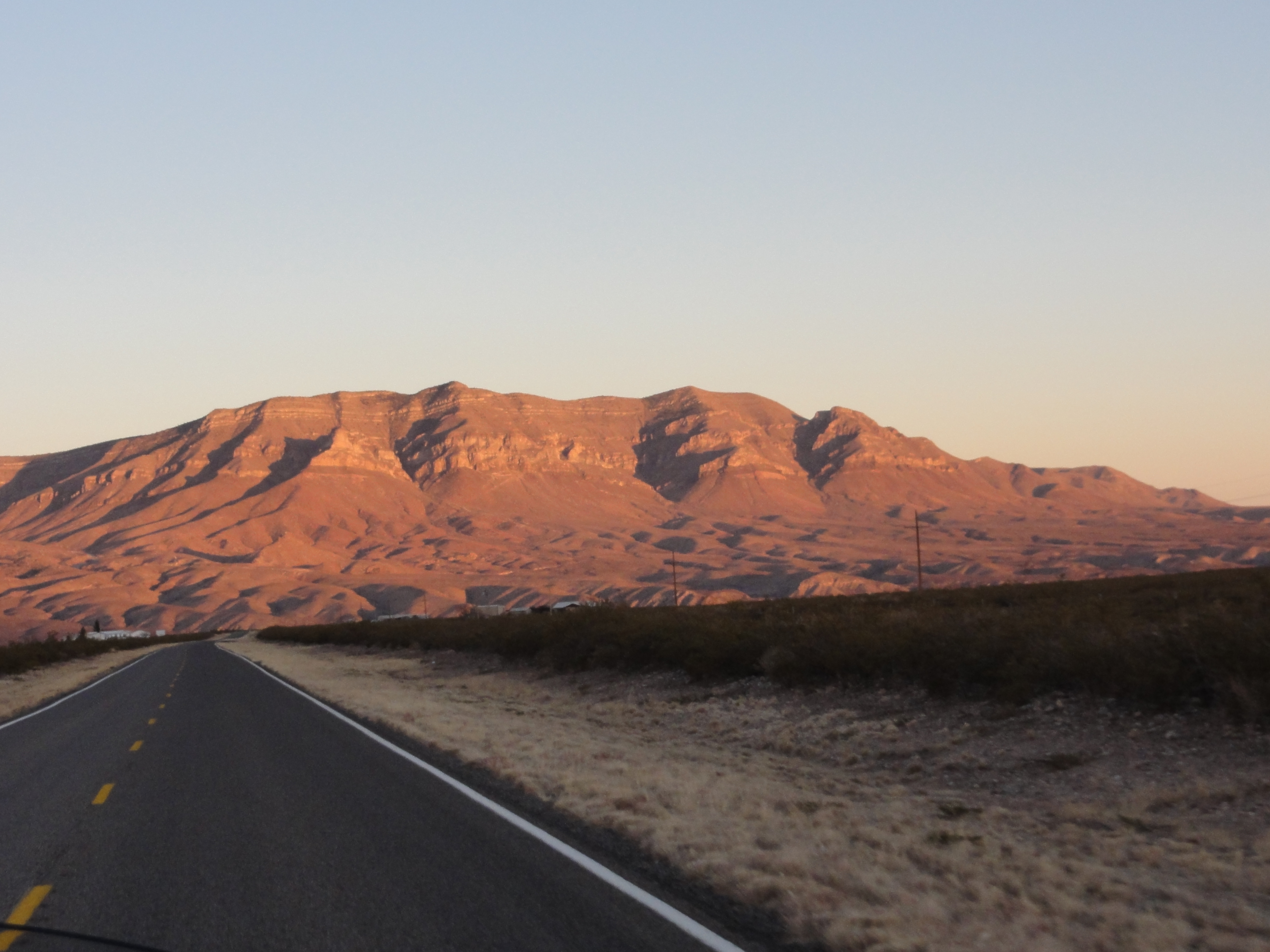
NM 152 looking eastbound slightly west of I-25 and US 85

County	Location	mi	km	Destinations	Notes
Grant	Santa Clara	0.000	0.000	US 180 – Bayard, Silver City	Western terminus
Grant	Hanover	4.623	7.440	NM 356 south – Bayard	Northern terminus of NM 356
Grant	San Lorenzo	14.320	23.046	NM 35 north – San Lorenzo, Mimbres	Southern terminus of NM 35
Grant	San Lorenzo	15.33	24.67	NM 61 south – Deming, City of Rocks State Park	Northern terminus of NM 61
Sierra	Hillsboro	48.557	78.145	NM 27 south – Lake Valley, Deming	Northern terminus of NM 27
Sierra	Caballo	65.622	105.608	I-25 / US 85 – Las Cruces, Socorro	I-25 exit 63; diamond interchange
Sierra	Caballo	66.067	106.325	NM 187 – Truth or Consequences, Caballo Lake State Park	Eastern terminus
1.000 mi = 1.609 km; 1.000 km = 0.621 mi

== See also ==
- List of state roads in New Mexico
