= Neocorus diversipennis =

Scientific classification
- Kingdom: Animalia
- Phylum: Arthropoda
- Class: Insecta
- Order: Coleoptera
- Suborder: Polyphaga
- Infraorder: Cucujiformia
- Family: Cerambycidae
- Subfamily: Cerambycinae
- Tribe: Neocorini
- Genus: Neocorus
- Species: N. diversipennis

Binomial name
- Neocorus diversipennis Belon, 1903

Species of beetle

Neocorus diversipennis is a species in the longhorn beetle family Cerambycidae. It is found in Brazil and Bolivia.
