= Aleiphaquilon rugosum =

Scientific classification
- Kingdom: Animalia
- Phylum: Arthropoda
- Class: Insecta
- Order: Coleoptera
- Suborder: Polyphaga
- Infraorder: Cucujiformia
- Family: Cerambycidae
- Subfamily: Cerambycinae
- Tribe: Neocorini
- Genus: Aleiphaquilon
- Species: A. rugosum

Binomial name
- Aleiphaquilon rugosum Martins & Galileo, 1994

Species of beetle

Aleiphaquilon rugosum is a species in the longhorn beetle family Cerambycidae. It is found in Bolivia and Brazil.
