= Coscinedes gracilis =

Scientific classification
- Domain: Eukaryota
- Kingdom: Animalia
- Phylum: Arthropoda
- Class: Insecta
- Order: Coleoptera
- Suborder: Polyphaga
- Infraorder: Cucujiformia
- Family: Cerambycidae
- Subfamily: Cerambycinae
- Tribe: Neocorini
- Genus: Coscinedes
- Species: C. gracilis

Binomial name
- Coscinedes gracilis Bates, 1885

Species of beetle

Coscinedes gracilis is a species of longhorn beetles in the family Cerambycidae. It is found in Panama, Nicaragua, Mexico, and Honduras.
