= Marauna punctatissima =

Scientific classification
- Kingdom: Animalia
- Phylum: Arthropoda
- Class: Insecta
- Order: Coleoptera
- Suborder: Polyphaga
- Infraorder: Cucujiformia
- Family: Cerambycidae
- Subfamily: Cerambycinae
- Tribe: Neocorini
- Genus: Marauna
- Species: M. punctatissima

Binomial name
- Marauna punctatissima Martins & Galileo, 2006

Species of beetle

Marauna punctatissima is a species in the longhorn beetle family Cerambycidae. It is found in Bolivia.
