= George Dashiell Bayard =

Union Army general

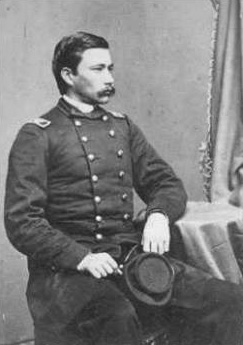
- George Dashiell Bayard
- Born: December 18, 1835; Seneca Falls, New York
- Died: December 14, 1862 (aged 26); Fredericksburg, Virginia
- Burial place: Princeton Cemetery, Princeton, New Jersey
- Military career
- Allegiance: United States of America; Union
- Branch: United States Army; Union Army
- Service years: 1856–1862
- Rank: Brigadier General
- Commands: 1st Pennsylvania Cavalry
- Conflicts: Indian Wars; American Civil War; Battle of Cross Keys; Battle of Cedar Mountain; Battle of Fredericksburg (DOW)

George Dashiell Bayard (December 18, 1835 – December 14, 1862) was a career soldier in the United States Army and a general in the Union Army in the American Civil War. He was wounded in the Battle of Fredericksburg and died the next day.

== Early life ==
He was born in Seneca Falls, New York, on December 18, 1835, to Jane Ann Dashiell and Samuel John Bayard, the son of Samuel Bayard (1766–1840) and the grandson of John Bayard (1738–1807).

His family moved as homesteaders to the Iowa Territory. He attended the United States Military Academy at West Point, graduating in 1856 as a second lieutenant in the U.S. cavalry. He graduated 11th in a class of 49. Bayard fought in the Indian Wars in Kansas and Colorado from 1856 to 1861. Bayard was shot in the face with a Kiowa arrow on July 11, 1860, and suffered considerable pain for months.

== Civil War ==
On August 27, 1861, Bayard was promoted to colonel in the 1st Pennsylvania Cavalry, based in Tenallytown (now Tenleytown, Washington, D.C.). On November 26, 1861, he and his cavalry rode into the crossroads hamlet of Dranesville in Fairfax County, Virginia, to investigate reports of Confederate activity. Finding nothing but two enemy pickets, Bayard took the opportunity to arrest six local citizens whom Bayard in his official report described as "secessionists of the bitterest stamp." Leaving Dranesville, Bayard's troopers and prisoners came under fire from the woods. Two Union soldiers were wounded, Bayard's horse was killed, and Bayard himself was slightly wounded in the shoulder and thigh.

Bayard was subsequently commissioned Chief of Cavalry of the III Corps and brigadier general of U.S. Volunteers on April 28, 1862.

Bayard fought under John C. Frémont at the Battle of Cross Keys. In August 1862, at the Battle of Cedar Mountain, he led a Union Army advance. After the battle, Bayard and Confederate General J.E.B. Stuart met under a flag of truce to arrange the recovery of the dead from the battlefield. Bayard and Stuart were friends from the pre-war regular army. Stuart had been two years ahead of Bayard at West Point, and they served together in Company G, 1st U.S. Cavalry Regiment.

Bayard was eventually promoted to Chief of Cavalry of the Left Grand Division, Army of the Potomac. With his old wound still bothering him, Bayard took a leave of absence for 13 days in September and consequently missed the Battle of Antietam.

At the battle of Fredericksburg on December 13, 1862, Bayard was awaiting orders at the Bernard house, Union General William B. Franklin's headquarters. When a distant Confederate battery opened fire on the headquarters, Bayard declined to take shelter. An artillery round bounced through the front yard and struck Bayard in the upper leg, doing irreparable damage to the inguinal artery. Bayard was taken inside the Bernard house, where he lingered until the next day. He died the afternoon of December 14, just four days short of his 27th birthday. Engaged to be married to the daughter of the superintendent of the United States Military Academy, Bayard and his fiancee, Miss Mary Eleanor Bowman, had planned to be married on his birthday. He was buried in Princeton Cemetery in Princeton, New Jersey. On his gravestone is carved the Bayard family motto, Sans peur et sans reproche (Without fear or reproach).

== Legacy ==
Fort Bayard in Washington D.C., was named in his honor. Bayard Street in Pacific Beach, San Diego, California, and in his hometown, Seneca Falls, New York, were named after him. Fort Bayard Park, which replaced the fort, is also named in his memory, as well as Bayard, New Mexico, Fort Bayard, New Mexico, and Fort Bayard National Cemetery. The latter is now part of the Fort Bayard Historic District, a commemoration of the Buffalo Soldiers.

== See also ==
- List of American Civil War generals (Union)
