= New Mexico State Road 356 =

State highway in New Mexico, United States

State Road 356

Route information
- Maintained by NMDOT
- Length: 5.052 mi (8.130 km)

Major junctions
- South end: US 180 in Bayard
- North end: NM 152 in Hanover

Location
- Country: United States
- State: New Mexico
- Counties: Grant

Highway system
- New Mexico State Highway System; Interstate; US; State; Scenic
← NM 355	→ NM 357

State Road 356 (NM 356) is a state highway in the US state of New Mexico. Its total length is approximately 44.3 miles (71.3 km). NM 356's southern terminus is in the city of Bayard at U.S. Route 180 (US 180), and the northern terminus is NM 152.

== Major intersections ==
The entire route is in Grant County.

Location	mi	km	Destinations	Notes
Bayard	0.000	0.000	US 180 north (West Central Avenue) – Santa Clara US 180 south (Tom Floyd Road) – Deming, Las Cruces	Southern terminus; T intersection
Hanover	5.052	8.130	NM 152 east – Santa Rita NM 152 west – Santa Clara	Northern terminus
Hanover	5.052	8.130	Fierro Road north – Fierro	Continuation north beyond northern terminus
1.000 mi = 1.609 km; 1.000 km = 0.621 mi
