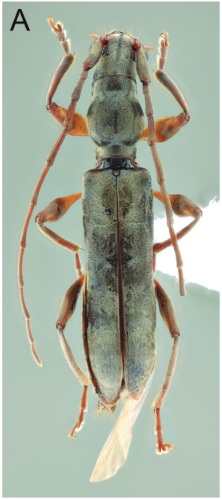

Scientific classification
- Kingdom: Animalia
- Phylum: Arthropoda
- Clade: Pancrustacea
- Class: Insecta
- Order: Coleoptera
- Suborder: Polyphaga
- Infraorder: Cucujiformia
- Family: Cerambycidae
- Subfamily: Cerambycinae
- Tribe: Neocorini
- Genus: Neocorus
- Species: N. ibidionoides

Binomial name
- Neocorus ibidionoides (Audinet-Serville, 1834)

Synonyms
- Neocorus ibidionides Gounelle, 1909; Neocorus ibidionoides Thomson, 1864; Stenygra ibidionoides White, 1855

= Neocorus ibidionoides =

Species of beetle

Neocorus ibidionoides is a species in the longhorn beetle family Cerambycidae. It is found in Paraguay, French Guiana, Argentina, Brazil, and Bolivia.

This species was described by Jean Guillaume Audinet-Serville in 1834.
