= Marauna bucki =

Scientific classification
- Kingdom: Animalia
- Phylum: Arthropoda
- Class: Insecta
- Order: Coleoptera
- Suborder: Polyphaga
- Infraorder: Cucujiformia
- Family: Cerambycidae
- Subfamily: Cerambycinae
- Tribe: Neocorini
- Genus: Marauna
- Species: M. bucki

Binomial name
- Marauna bucki Galileo & Martins, 2007

Species of beetle

Marauna bucki is a species in the longhorn beetle family Cerambycidae, found in Brazil. It was described by Galileo and Martins in 2007.
