= Aleiphaquilon plaumanni =

Scientific classification
- Kingdom: Animalia
- Phylum: Arthropoda
- Class: Insecta
- Order: Coleoptera
- Suborder: Polyphaga
- Infraorder: Cucujiformia
- Family: Cerambycidae
- Subfamily: Cerambycinae
- Tribe: Neocorini
- Genus: Aleiphaquilon
- Species: A. plaumanni

Binomial name
- Aleiphaquilon plaumanni Martins, 1975

Species of beetle

Aleiphaquilon plaumanni is a species in the longhorn beetle family Cerambycidae. It is found in Brazil, Uruguay, and Bolivia.
