= Coscinedes oaxaca =

Scientific classification
- Kingdom: Animalia
- Phylum: Arthropoda
- Class: Insecta
- Order: Coleoptera
- Suborder: Polyphaga
- Infraorder: Cucujiformia
- Family: Cerambycidae
- Subfamily: Cerambycinae
- Tribe: Neocorini
- Genus: Coscinedes
- Species: C. oaxaca

Binomial name
- Coscinedes oaxaca Martins & Galileo, 2006

Species of beetle

Coscinedes oaxaca is a species in the longhorn beetle family Cerambycidae. It is found in Mexico.
