= Aleiphaquilon myrmex =

Scientific classification
- Kingdom: Animalia
- Phylum: Arthropoda
- Class: Insecta
- Order: Coleoptera
- Suborder: Polyphaga
- Infraorder: Cucujiformia
- Family: Cerambycidae
- Subfamily: Cerambycinae
- Tribe: Neocorini
- Genus: Aleiphaquilon
- Species: A. myrmex

Binomial name
- Aleiphaquilon myrmex Napp & Martins, 1984

Species of beetle

Aleiphaquilon myrmex is a species in the longhorn beetle family Cerambycidae. It is found in Colombia.
