= 2013 Little League Softball World Series =

Tournament details
- Dates: August 5–August 14
- Teams: 10

Final positions
- Champions: Tucson, Arizona; Sunnyside Little League
- Runners-up: McLean, Virginia; McLean Little League

The 2013 Little League Softball World Series was held in Portland, Oregon from August 8 to August 14, 2013. Six teams from the United States and four from throughout the world competed for the Little League Softball World Champions.

== Teams ==
Each team that competes in the tournament will come out of one of the 10 regions.

United States	International
Elyria, Ohio; Central Region; East Elyria LL	Iloilo, Philippines; Asia Pacific; Iloilo LL
Robbinsville, New Jersey; East Region; Robbinsville LL	Victoria, British Columbia; Canada; Hampton LL
McLean, Virginia; Southeast Region; McLean LL	Milan, Italy; Europe and Africa; Lombardia LL
Robinson, Texas; Southwest Region; Robinson LL	Maunabo, Puerto Rico; Latin America; ASOFEM LL
Tucson, Arizona; West Region; Sunnyside LL	Only 4 International Teams
Tualatin, Oregon; Oregon District 4 Tualatin City LL	Only 4 International Teams

== Standings ==
Pool A
Rank	Region	Record
1	(Virginia) Southeast	4–0
2	(Puerto Rico) Latin America	2-2
3	(Ohio) Central	2-2
4	Oregon D4	2-2
5	(Italy) Europe and Africa	0–4

Pool B
Rank	Region	Record
1	(Arizona) West	3–1
2	(New Jersey) East	3–1
3	(Texas) Southwest	2-2
4	(Philippines) Asia Pacific	1–3
5	Canada	1–3

== Results ==
All times shown are US EDT.◄

Pool Play
Pool A	(Oregon) D4 1 (F/4) (Ohio) CE 12◄ linescore	(Puerto Rico) LA 9◄ (Italy) EA 0 linescore	(Ohio) CE 18◄ (F/4) (Italy) EA 0 linescore	(Virginia) SE 11◄ (Oregon) D4 1 linescore	(Puerto Rico) LA (Virginia) SE linescore	(Oregon) D4 (Italy) EA linescore	(Puerto Rico) LA (Oregon) D4 linescore	(Ohio) CE (Virginia) SE linescore	(Virginia) SE (Italy) EA linescore	(Puerto Rico) LA (Ohio) CE linescore
Pool B	(Philippines) AP 2 (F/8) (New Jersey) EA 3◄ linescore	(Canada) CN 2◄ (Arizona) WE 1 linescore	(New Jersey) EA 10◄ (Canada) CN 0 linescore	(Philippines) AP 3 (F/4) (Texas) SW 14◄ linescore	(Arizona) WE 1◄ (Texas) SW 0 linescore	(Canada) CN (Philippines) AP linescore	(Arizona) WE (Philippines) AP linescore	(New Jersey) EA (Texas) SW linescore	(Texas) SW (Canada) CN linescore	(Arizona) WE (New Jersey) EA linescore
Consolation round
5th-10th	A5; B5				A4; B4			A3; B3		
Elimination Round
Semifinals	A1; B2					B1; A2				
3rd Place	LS1; LS2									
World Championship	WS1; WS2									

=== Pool A ===
Region	Record
(Ohio) Central	2–2
(Virginia) Southeast	4–0
(Puerto Rico) Latin America	2–2
Oregon D4	2–2
(Italy) Europe and Africa	0–4

==== Central 12, Oregon D4 1 ====
August 8 10:00 am PST Alpenrose Dairy
Team	1	2	3	4	5	6	R	H	E
Oregon D4	0	1	0	0	-	-	1	5	5
(Ohio) Central ◄	1	3	8	-	-	-	12	11	0
WP: April Howser (1–0) LP: Lily Marshall (0–1) Sv: Faith Hamilton (1)

==== Latin America 9, Europe and Africa 0 ====
August 8 4:00 pm PST Alpenrose Dairy
Team	1	2	3	4	5	6	R	H	E
(Puerto Rico) Latin America ◄	0	0	0	3	3	3	9	8	1
(Italy) Europe and Africa	0	0	0	0	0	0	0	2	1
WP: Joselyn Ortiz (1–0) LP: Stefania Colombo (0–1) Sv: None

=== Central 18, Europe and Africa 0 ===
August 9 12:30 pm PST Alpenrose Dairy
Team	1	2	3	4	5	6	R	H	E
(Ohio) Central ◄	2	0	16	0	-	-	18	19	1
(Italy) Europe and Africa	0	0	0	0	-	-	0	2	3
WP: April Howser (2–0) LP: Chiara Marazzi (0–1) Sv: Faith Hamilton (2)

=== Southeast 11, Oregon D4 1 ===
August 9 7:00 pm PST Alpenrose Dairy
Team	1	2	3	4	5	6	R	H	E
(Virginia) Southeast ◄	2	1	1	1	3	3	11	10	1
Oregon D4	0	0	1	0	0	0	1	1	3
WP: Jamie Wang (1–0) LP: Elizabeth Hillier (0–1) Sv: Kathryn Sandercock (1)

=== Southeast 9, Latin America 5 ===
August 10 1:00pm PST Alpenrose Dairy
Team	1	2	3	4	5	6	R	H	E
(Puerto Rico) Latin America	0	1	0	0	0	4	5	6	5
(Virginia) Southeast ◄	4	3	2	0	0	–	9	7	2
WP: Rachel Remer (1–0) LP: Josely Ortiz (1–1) Sv: Kathryn Sandercock (2)

August PST Alpenrose Dairy
Team
◄

=== Elimination round ===
Semifinals
A1	(Virginia) Southeast	6
B2	(New Jersey) East	3
B1	(Arizona) West	10
A2	(Puerto Rico) Latin America	0

Finals
WSF1	(Virginia) Southeast	0
WSF2	(Arizona) West	9
Third place
LSF1	(New Jersey) East	7
LSF2	(Puerto Rico) Latin America	1

2013 Little League Softball World Series Champions
Sunnyside Little League
Tucson, Arizona
