= Aleiphaquilon castaneum =

Scientific classification
- Kingdom: Animalia
- Phylum: Arthropoda
- Clade: Pancrustacea
- Class: Insecta
- Order: Coleoptera
- Suborder: Polyphaga
- Infraorder: Cucujiformia
- Family: Cerambycidae
- Subfamily: Cerambycinae
- Tribe: Neocorini
- Genus: Aleiphaquilon
- Species: A. castaneum

Binomial name
- Aleiphaquilon castaneum (Gounelle, 1911)

Synonyms
- Aleiphaquilon castaneus Martins, 1975; Aleiphaquilon unicolor Martins, 1970; Tillomorpha castanea Blackwelder, 1946

Species of beetle

Aleiphaquilon castaneum is a species in the longhorn beetle family Cerambycidae. It is found in Argentina, Bolivia, Brazil, and Paraguay.
