= Neocorus (beetle) =

Scientific classification
- Kingdom: Animalia
- Phylum: Arthropoda
- Class: Insecta
- Order: Coleoptera
- Suborder: Polyphaga
- Infraorder: Cucujiformia
- Family: Cerambycidae
- Subfamily: Cerambycinae
- Tribe: Neocorini
- Genus: Neocorus; Thomson, 1864

Genus of beetles

Neocorus is a genus of longhorn beetles in the family Cerambycidae. There are at least three described species in Neocorus.

== Species ==
These three species belong to the genus Neocorus:

- Neocorus diversipennis Belon, 1903 (Brazil and Bolivia)
- Neocorus ibidionoides (Audinet-Serville, 1834) (Paraguay, French Guiana, Argentina, Brazil, and Bolivia)
- Neocorus zikani Melzer, 1920 (Brazil and Uruguay)
