= Fort Bayard (Washington, D.C.) =

Historic fort in Washington, D.C.

- Part of the Civil War defenses of Washington, D.C.
- District of Columbia
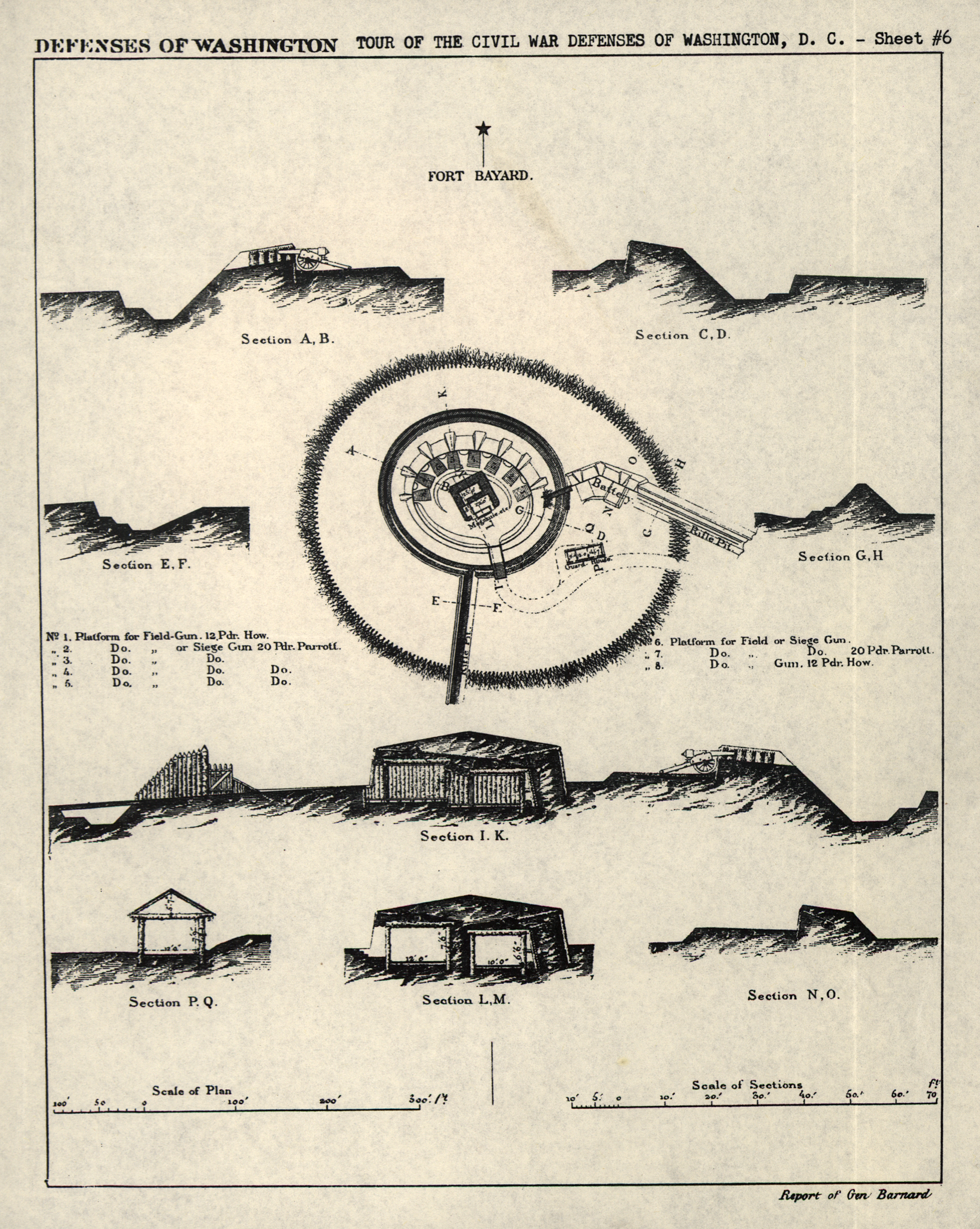
- Map of the fort

Site information
- Type: Earthwork fort
- Owner: U.S. National Park Service
- Controlled by: Union Army
- Open to the public: Yes
- Condition: Public park

Location
- Coordinates: 38°57′23″N 77°05′28″W

Site history
- Built: 1861
- Built by: U.S. Army Corps of Engineers
- In use: 1861–1865
- Materials: Earth, timber
- Demolished: 1865
- Battles/wars: American Civil War

Fort Bayard was an earthwork fort constructed in 1861 northwest of Tenleytown in the District of Columbia as part of the defenses of Washington, D.C., during the American Civil War. It never faced major opposition during the conflict and was decommissioned following the surrender of Robert E. Lee's Army of Northern Virginia. Named after Brigadier General George Dashiell Bayard, who was killed at the Battle of Fredericksburg, the site of the fort is in Boundary Park, located at the intersection of River Road and Western Avenue NW in Washington, D.C., and is maintained by the U.S. National Park Service. No trace of the fort remains, though a marker commemorating its existence has been erected by the Park Service.

== Pre-war use ==
Prior to the outbreak of the Civil War, the District of Columbia was a predominantly rural area. Though the city of Washington is today synonymous with the District of Columbia, in 1861, Washington occupied only a portion of the District. The remaining portions of the District were considered part of Washington County, and it was in this region that most of the forts defending Washington, including Fort Bayard, were constructed. Washington County was characterized as "the rural part of the district ... occupied by farms of various sizes and the grand estates of the well-to-do."

The site of Fort Bayard itself was owned by Philip J. Buckey, a farmer who made his home in the Fourth Ward of Washington County. During the construction process, he valued the land at approximately $5,000, and continued to live in a farmhouse near the fort with his wife, four children, and two servants throughout the course of the war. In exchange for the use of his land for the site of Fort Bayard, Buckey received $50.00 per year in rent from the War Department.

Also nearby was the Shoemaker family, which owned substantial tracts of land in both the District and in Maryland. Three forts or portions of forts were built on their property: Fort Simmons, Fort Mansfield, and Battery Bailey. Despite the loss of much of their land, the Shoemaker family continued to operate a local general store and sold various sundry items to the garrison at Fort Bayard.

== Planning and construction ==
Following the secession of Virginia and that state joining the Confederacy, Federal troops marched from Washington into the Arlington region of northern Virginia. The move was intended to forestall any attempt by Virginia militia or Confederate States Army to seize the capital city of the United States. Over the next seven weeks, forts were constructed along the banks of the Potomac River and at the approaches to each of the three major bridges (Chain Bridge, Long Bridge, and Aqueduct Bridge) connecting Virginia to Washington and Georgetown.

While the Potomac River forts were being built, planning and surveying was ordered for an enormous new ring of forts to protect the city. Unlike the fortifications under construction, the new forts would defend the city in all directions, not just the most direct route through Arlington. In mid-July, this work was interrupted by the First Battle of Bull Run. As the Army of Northeastern Virginia marched south to Manassas, the soldiers previously assigned to construction duties marched instead to battle. In the days that followed the Union defeat at Bull Run, panicked efforts were made to defend Washington from what was perceived as an imminent Confederate attack. The makeshift trenches and earthworks that resulted were largely confined to Arlington and the direct approaches to Washington.

On July 26, 1861, five days after the battle, Maj. Gen. George B. McClellan was named commander of the military district of Washington and the subsequently renamed Army of the Potomac. Upon arriving in Washington, McClellan was appalled by the condition of the city's defenses. "In no quarter were the dispositions for defense such as to offer a vigorous resistance to a respectable body of the enemy, either in the position and numbers of the troops or the number and character of the defensive works... not a single defensive work had been commenced on the Maryland side. There was nothing to prevent the enemy shelling the city from heights within easy range, which could be occupied by a hostile column almost without resistance."

To remedy the situation, one of McClellan's first orders upon taking command was to greatly expand the defenses of Washington. At all points of the compass, forts and entrenchments would be constructed in sufficient strength to slow an attack and buy time for reinforcements to arrive and bolster the city's defenses. Brigadier General John G. Barnard, was named chief engineer of the Department of Washington, and would supervise the construction and maintenance of the forts before being named chief engineer of the armies in the field by Ulysses S. Grant in 1864.

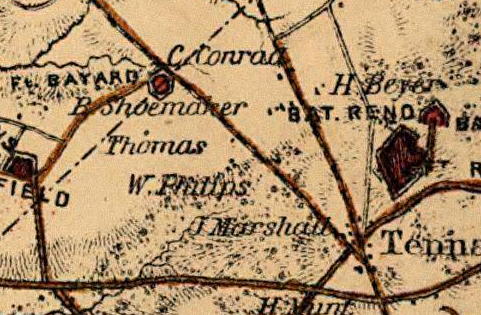
The location of Fort Bayard northwest of Tenleytown and Fort Reno in the District of Columbia. The line bisecting the fort is the border between the District of Columbia and Maryland.

Prior to the outbreak of war, the Great Falls Turnpike, also known as River Road, was an important traffic artery for trade entering the District of Columbia from western Maryland and beyond. It connected the village of Tenleytown with the city of Washington, and roughly paralleled the Potomac River before turning northward. Due to its strategic position along the river, which formed the border between the Confederate state of Virginia and the Union state of Maryland, it had great military value and was a likely route for an attacking army, as would be proved three years after the outbreak of war during the Battle of Fort Stevens.

To prevent a Confederate force from advancing on Washington along the Potomac, several forts were constructed on hills near the river. To guard River Road, which was the most direct route into the city, U.S. Army engineers built a small, round fort at the point where River Road crossed into the district of Columbia. With a perimeter of only 123 yards and mounting only six guns, it was located forward of Fort Reno, the largest fort protecting the Tenleytown area. Details of the actual construction process are scarce, though a letter from a member of the Ninth New York Heavy Artillery regiment to the Democratic Press newspaper indicates that the fort was at least partially built with labor from that regiment.

In April 1863, the fort was named in honor of the recently deceased Brigadier General George Dashiell Bayard, who had been killed on December 13, 1862, at the Battle of Fredericksburg. At the time of its dedication, the fort was roughly complete. Round in shape and surrounded by trenches and abati, the fort's guns faced north, overlooking River Road. A service road crossed the trenches in the southern half of the fort, connecting with River Road behind the fort. Rifle pits extended northeast to Fort Reno and southwest to Fort Simmons. A small battery of guns, named Battery Bayard, was an outwork of the fort and covered a blind spot in the ravine to the northwest of the fort.

== Wartime use ==
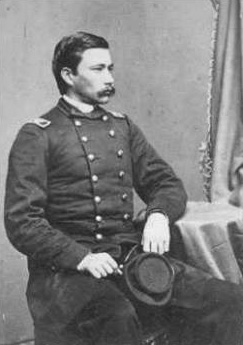
Brigadier General George Dashiell Bayard

In accordance to a plan laid out in an October 1861 report by General John G. Barnard, "rear line" forts were to receive one man per yard of fort perimeter when fully garrisoned. Front-line forts were to receive two men per yard, when needed. However, most forts were not kept fully garrisoned at all times. Due to its location north of the Potomac River, Fort Bayard was considered a rear-line fort. If the fort needed to be fully garrisoned due to an impending attack, the difference in the actual garrison and the plan would be made good from Washington's 25,000-man reserve force. As General Barnard would say in a December 24, 1862, report, "It is seldom necessary to keep these infantry supports attached to the works."

However, this plan only applied to men manning the walls of the fort, not the artillerymen who would be serving the fort's guns. To man the guns of Fort Greble and those of Washington's other forts, Barnard designated three crews for each gun. These crews would be permanently located at the fort, unlike the men assigned to the walls of the fort.

This plan was affected by the needs of the war. As the fighting dragged on and casualties mounted, the various commanders of the Army of the Potomac repeatedly raided the Washington garrison for trained artillerymen and infantry replacements. By 1864, Washington had been stripped to a total less than half that of Barnard's 1861 recommendation.

A May 1864 report by General Albion P. Howe, inspector of artillery for the Union Army, found Fort Bayard's garrison to consist of only a single company from the Seventh New York Heavy Artillery regiment. One hundred and thirty-seven men of various ranks manned two 12-pound field howitzers and four 20-pound Parrott rifles. In addition, Howe found the fort's single magazine to be "dry and in good order," and the ammunition supply as "full and servicible." As to the garrison of the fort, Howe was less complimentary. After examining the garrison company's drill in artillery and infantry tactics, he reported the artillery drill as "ordinary; needs improving," the infantry drill as "very indifferent; needs much improving," and discipline at the fort overall was "indifferent."

Artillerymen and infantry from New Hampshire, Pennsylvania, Ohio, and New York were stationed at the fort at various times during the war. Following General Howe's unfavorable review of the Seventh New York, the garrison was replaced by a company of men from the 163rd Ohio Infantry.

=== Battle of Fort Stevens ===
During the course of the war, Fort Bayard came under attack only once. During the Battle of Fort Stevens in July 1864, Confederate general Jubal Early launched a 25,000-man raid into Maryland with the hope of drawing off some of General Ulysses S. Grant's troops, who were pressing hard against the Army of Northern Virginia in the siege of Petersburg. The raid hoped to attack Washington, thereby distracting Grant and potentially allowing the Confederate forces time to rest and regroup. On the morning of July 11, Confederate cavalry and infantry under the command of Brigadier General John McCausland advanced towards Washington with the goal of capturing Fort Reno, which defended the village of Tenleytown. Though they drove back the skirmish line in front of Fort Bayard, the Confederate cavalry were met with a heavy barrage of cannon fire from Bayard and its supporting forts. Discouraged by the resistance, McCausland's brigade moved to join up with the rest of Early's force, which was grouping for an assault on Fort Stevens.

Throughout the day, additional reinforcements arrived at the fort, but no further Confederate attack took place. During the remainder of the war, Fort Bayard did not fire a shot in anger.

== Postwar use ==
After the surrender of Robert E. Lee's Army of Northern Virginia on April 9, 1865, the primary reason for manned defenses protecting Washington ceased to exist. Initial recommendations by Col. Barton S. Alexander, chief engineer of the Washington defenses, were to divide the defenses into three classes: those that should be kept active (first-class), those that should be mothballed and kept in a reserve state (second-class), and those that should be abandoned entirely (third-class). Owing to its position north of the Potomac River and to the small size of the fort, Fort Bayard fell into the third-class category, and was abandoned a few months after the end of the war.

=== Fort Bayard Park ===
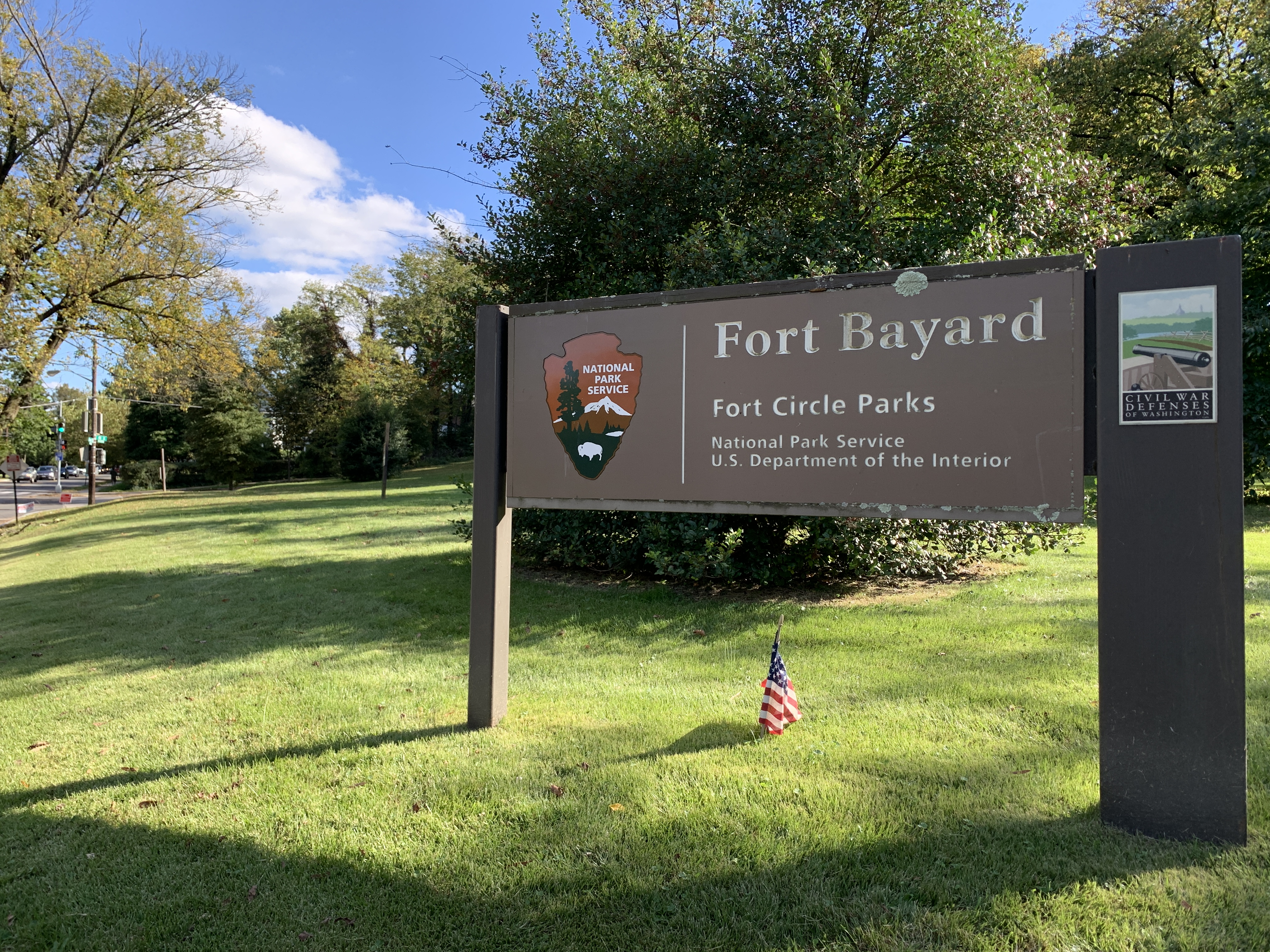
Fort Bayard Park

The abandoned fort remained in a constantly deteriorating condition until 1919, when the Commissioners of the District of Columbia pushed Congress to pass a bill that would consolidate the sites of the aging forts into a "Fort Circle" system of parks that would ring the growing city of Washington. As envisioned by the Commissioners, the Fort Circle would be a green ring of parks outside the city, owned by the government, and connected by a "Fort Drive" road in order to allow Washington's citizens to easily escape the confines of the capital. However, the bill allowing for the purchase of the former forts, which had been turned back over to private ownership after the war, failed to pass both the House of Representatives and Senate.

Despite that failure, in 1925 a similar bill passed both the House and Senate, which allowed for the creation of the National Capital Parks Commission (NCPC) to oversee the construction of a Fort Circle of parks similar to that proposed in 1919. The duty of purchasing land and constructing the fort parks changed hands several times throughout the 1920s and 1930s, eventually culminating with the Department of the Interior and the National Park Service taking control of the project in the 1940s. By the time the site of Fort Bayard was purchased in 1926, the remains of the fort had been demolished and homes were being built on the site.

Budget cuts and the interruption of World War II repeatedly postponed the Fort Circle Park plan, but it was the growth of the city of Washington itself that eventually killed the plan. By 1963, when President John F. Kennedy began pushing Congress to finally build the Fort Circle Drive, many in Washington and the National Park Service were openly questioning whether the plan had outgrown its usefulness. After all, by this time, Washington had grown past the ring of forts that had protected it a century earlier, and city surface roads already connected the parks, albeit not in as linear a route as envisioned. The plan to link Fort Bayard Park with other fort parks via a grand drive was quietly dropped in the years that followed.

Today, the park is bordered by Western Avenue, River Road, and Fessenden, 46th and 47th Streets, NW in Washington, D.C. It contains one softball field and one soccer field, and is maintained year-round by the U.S. National Park Service. In 1999, neighborhood residents established Friends of Fort Bayard Park, Inc., a non-profit 501(c)(3) corporation with the goal of assisting the National Park Service in maintaining Fort Bayard Park. To this end, the organization hosts an annual cleanup of the park, and holds fundraisers in order to build improvements at the park.

== See also ==
- Civil War Defenses of Washington
- Washington, D.C., in the American Civil War
- Bibliography of the American Civil War
- Bibliography of Abraham Lincoln
- Bibliography of Ulysses S. Grant
