= Marauna =

Scientific classification
- Kingdom: Animalia
- Phylum: Arthropoda
- Class: Insecta
- Order: Coleoptera
- Suborder: Polyphaga
- Infraorder: Cucujiformia
- Family: Cerambycidae
- Subfamily: Cerambycinae
- Tribe: Neocorini
- Genus: Marauna; Martins & Galileo, 2006

Genus of beetles

Marauna is a genus of longhorn beetles in the family Cerambycidae. There are at least three described species in Marauna.

== Species ==
These three species belong to the genus Marauna:

- Marauna abati Galileo & Martins, 2007 (Paraguay)
- Marauna bucki Galileo & Martins, 2007 (Brazil)
- Marauna punctatissima Martins & Galileo, 2006 (Bolivia)
