= Coscinedes =

Scientific classification
- Domain: Eukaryota
- Kingdom: Animalia
- Phylum: Arthropoda
- Class: Insecta
- Order: Coleoptera
- Suborder: Polyphaga
- Infraorder: Cucujiformia
- Family: Cerambycidae
- Subfamily: Cerambycinae
- Tribe: Neocorini
- Genus: Coscinedes; Bates, 1885

Genus of beetles

Coscinedes is a genus of longhorn beetles in the family Cerambycidae. There are at least three described species in Coscinedes.

== Species ==
These three species belong to the genus Coscinedes:

- Coscinedes elpis Santos-Silva, 2022
- Coscinedes gracilis Bates, 1885 (Panama, Nicaragua, Mexico, and Honduras)
- Coscinedes oaxaca Martins & Galileo, 2006 (Mexico)
