= Fregolia =

Scientific classification
- Kingdom: Animalia
- Phylum: Arthropoda
- Class: Insecta
- Order: Coleoptera
- Suborder: Polyphaga
- Infraorder: Cucujiformia
- Family: Cerambycidae
- Tribe: Neocorini
- Genus: Fregolia; Gounelle, 1911
- Species: F. listropteroides

Binomial name
- Fregolia listropteroides Gounelle, 1911

Genus of beetles

Fregolia is a genus of longhorn beetles in the family Cerambycidae. This genus has a single species, Fregolia listropteroides. It is found in Argentina, Brazil, and Paraguay.
