= Myrmeocorus =

Scientific classification
- Domain: Eukaryota
- Kingdom: Animalia
- Phylum: Arthropoda
- Class: Insecta
- Order: Coleoptera
- Suborder: Polyphaga
- Infraorder: Cucujiformia
- Family: Cerambycidae
- Tribe: Neocorini
- Genus: Myrmeocorus; Martins, 1975
- Species: M. allodapus

Binomial name
- Myrmeocorus allodapus Martins, 1975

Genus of beetles

Myrmeocorus is a genus of longhorn beetles in the family Cerambycidae. This genus has a single species, Myrmeocorus allodapus. It is found in Brazil.
