= Aleiphaquilon =

Scientific classification
- Kingdom: Animalia
- Phylum: Arthropoda
- Class: Insecta
- Order: Coleoptera
- Suborder: Polyphaga
- Infraorder: Cucujiformia
- Family: Cerambycidae
- Subfamily: Cerambycinae
- Tribe: Neocorini
- Genus: Aleiphaquilon; Martins, 1970

Genus of beetles

Aleiphaquilon is a genus of Long-Horned Beetles in the beetle family Cerambycidae. There are about nine described species in Aleiphaquilon, found in South America.

== Species ==
These nine species belong to the genus Aleiphaquilon:

- Aleiphaquilon castaneum (Gounelle, 1911) (Argentina, Bolivia, Brazil, and Paraguay)
- Aleiphaquilon eburneum Mermudes & Monné, 1999 (Brazil)
- Aleiphaquilon myrmex Napp & Martins, 1984 (Colombia)
- Aleiphaquilon plaumanni Martins, 1975 (Brazil, Uruguay, and Bolivia)
- Aleiphaquilon rugosum Martins & Galileo, 1994 (Bolivia and Brazil)
- Aleiphaquilon taeniatum Mermudes & Monné, 1999 (Brazil)
- Aleiphaquilon tasyba Galileo & Martins, 2009 (Bolivia and Brazil)
- Aleiphaquilon tricolor Martins, 1975 (Brazil and Bolivia)
- Aleiphaquilon una Mermudes & Monné, 1999 (Brazil)
