= Neocoridolon =

Scientific classification
- Kingdom: Animalia
- Phylum: Arthropoda
- Class: Insecta
- Order: Coleoptera
- Suborder: Polyphaga
- Infraorder: Cucujiformia
- Family: Cerambycidae
- Tribe: Neocorini
- Genus: Neocoridolon; Melzer, 1930
- Species: N. borgmeieri

Binomial name
- Neocoridolon borgmeieri Melzer, 1930

Genus of beetles

Neocoridolon is a genus of longhorn beetles in the family Cerambycidae. This genus has a single species, Neocoridolon borgmeieri. It is found in Brazil.
