= Alonzo Bowman =

US Army Medal of Honor recipient (1848–1885)

- Born: June 15, 1848; Washington, Maine, US
- Died: October 4, 1885 (aged 37)
- Burial place: Fort Bayard National Cemetery, New Mexico
- Military career
- Allegiance: United States of America
- Branch: United States Army
- Rank: Sergeant
- Units: Company D, 6th Cavalry Regiment
- Conflicts: Indian Wars
- Awards: - Medal of Honor

Alonzo Bowman (June 15, 1848 – October 4, 1885) was a United States Army Sergeant during the Indian Wars who received the Medal of Honor on November 4, 1882, for bravery at Cibecue Creek, Arizona, on August 30, 1881.

== Medal of Honor citation ==
Citation:

Conspicuous and extraordinary bravery in attacking mutinous scouts.

== See also ==
- List of Medal of Honor recipients
