= Marauna abati =

Scientific classification
- Kingdom: Animalia
- Phylum: Arthropoda
- Class: Insecta
- Order: Coleoptera
- Suborder: Polyphaga
- Infraorder: Cucujiformia
- Family: Cerambycidae
- Genus: Marauna
- Species: M. abati

Binomial name
- Marauna abati Galileo & Martins, 2007

Species of beetle

Marauna abati is a species in the longhorn beetle family Cerambycidae, found in Paraguay. It was described by Galileo and Martins in 2007.
