= Abatipoçanga =

16th-century Tamoio chief

Abatipoçanga (Note: In the original spelling Abbati Bossange) was a 16th-century Tamoio chief from the village of Taquaruçutiba (Note: In the original spelling Tackwara sutibi. The village of Taquaruçutiba was also mentioned in the work of Jean de Léry, who arrived in Guanabara Bay three years after Staden; he referred to it as Sacouarr-oussou-tuue, in the original spelling.) in Rio de Janeiro. He was given the German Hans Staden as a gift by the Indians of Ubatuba (Note: In the original spelling Uwattibi) and began treating him as a son, believing Staden's promises that his "French brothers" would soon arrive with many goods. Staden managed to deceive Abatipoçanga and, in less than three weeks, escaped aboard the French ship Catherine de Vatteville. The name "Abatipoçanga" means "corn medicine" in the Tupi language, from abati ("corn") and posanga ("medicine"). Abatipoçanga was portrayed by the Brazilian actor Walter Portella in the 1999 film Hans Staden.

== Bibliography ==
- Almeida, Geraldo Gustavo de (1988). Heróis indígenas do Brasil: memórias sinceras de uma raça [Indigenous heroes of Brazil: sincere memories of a race] (in Portuguese). Rio de Janeiro: Livraria Editora Cátedra. Archived from the original on 15 July 2024.
- Navarro, Eduardo de Almeida (2013). Dicionário de tupi antigo: a língua indígena clássica do Brasil [Dictionary of Old Tupi: the classical indigenous language of Brazil] (in Portuguese) (1st ed.). São Paulo: Global. ISBN 978-85-260-1933-1.
- Silva, Rafael Freitas da (2020). O Rio antes do Rio [Rio before Rio] (in Portuguese) (4th ed.). Belo Horizonte: Relicário. ISBN 978-65-8627-904-7.

== Videography ==
- Pereira, Luiz Alberto (director) (31 July 1999). Hans Staden (motion picture). Brazil and Portugal: Jorge Neves Produções Audiovisuais and Lapfilme Brasil.
