= Santa Clara, New Mexico =

- Village
- Location of Santa Clara in New Mexico

- Location in the United States
- Coordinates: 32°46′48″N 108°08′57″W
- Country: United States
- State: New Mexico
- County: Grant

Area
  - Total: 2.00 sq mi (5.19 km^{2})
  - Land: 1.99 sq mi (5.15 km^{2})
  - Water: 0.015 sq mi (0.04 km^{2})
- Elevation: 5,998 ft (1,828 m)

Population (2020)
  - Total: 1,637
  - Density: 823/sq mi (317.6/km^{2})
- Time zone: UTC-7 (Mountain (MST))
  - Summer (DST): UTC-6 (MDT)
- ZIP code: 88026
- Area code: 575
- FIPS code: 35-70270
- GNIS feature ID: 2413590
- Website: villageofsantaclara.org

Santa Clara is a village in Grant County, New Mexico, United States. As of the 2020 census, Santa Clara had a population of 1,637. Today it is a bedroom community for nearby Silver City.

== Name ==
Santa Clara was long known as "Central". Its post office was established under that name on January 8, 1887, and the name was changed to "Santa Clara" in 1996.

== Geography ==
Santa Clara is located east of the center of Grant County. U.S. Route 180 passes around the north and east sides of the village, leading west 7 miles (11 km) to Silver City, the county seat, and south 2 miles (3 km) to Bayard.

According to the United States Census Bureau, the village has a total area of 1.3 square miles (3.3 km^{2}), of which 0.012 square miles (0.03 km^{2}), or 0.99%, is water.

== Demographics ==
Historical population
Census	Pop.	Note	%±
2000	1,944		—
2010	1,686		−13.3%
2020	1,637		−2.9%
U.S. Decennial Census

As of the census of 2000, there were 1,944 people, 696 households, and 496 families residing in the village. The population density was 1,925.3 inhabitants per square mile (743.4/km^{2}). There were 821 housing units at an average density of 813.1 per square mile (313.9/km^{2}). The racial makeup of the village was 62.91% White, 0.36% African American, 1.95% Native American, 0.05% Asian, 30.61% from other races, and 4.12% from two or more races. Hispanic or Latino of any race were 83.49% of the population.

There were 696 households, out of which 38.4% had children under the age of 18 living with them, 46.0% were married couples living together, 20.4% had a female householder with no husband present, and 28.7% were non-families. 25.6% of all households were made up of individuals, and 10.6% had someone living alone who was 65 years of age or older. The average household size was 2.79 and the average family size was 3.38.

In the village, the population was spread out, with 32.8% under the age of 18, 8.6% from 18 to 24, 23.7% from 25 to 44, 19.6% from 45 to 64, and 15.3% who were 65 years of age or older. The median age was 32 years. For every 100 females, there were 91.0 males. For every 100 females age 18 and over, there were 83.8 males.

The median income for a household in the village was $20,980, and the median income for a family was $24,732. Males had a median income of $26,471 versus $16,875 for females. The per capita income for the village was $9,484. About 27.1% of families and 28.8% of the population were below the poverty line, including 39.4% of those under age 18 and 14.1% of those age 65 or over.

== See also ==
- Fort Bayard Historic District
- Fort Bayard National Cemetery
