= Megliore degli Abati =

Italian poet

Megliore degli Abati (Italian pronunciation: [meʎˈʎoːre deʎʎ aˈbaːti]) was an Italian poet from 13th century Florence. He was a friend of the poet Guittone d'Arezzo. He is said to have been fluent in Provençal. He was considered to be one of the first poets who wrote in the vernacular.
