= Queen Sheba's Ring =

1910 novel by Henry Rider Haggard

- First edition (US)
- Author: H. Rider Haggard
- Language: English
- Publisher: Eveleigh Nash & Grayson (UK); Doubleday, Page (US)
- Publication date: 1910
- Publication place: United Kingdom

Queen Sheba's Ring is a 1910 adventure novel by H. Rider Haggard set in central Africa. It resembles the author's earlier works King Solomon's Mines and She, featuring plotting priests, beautiful women, and daring British adventurers.
