= Fort Bayard Historic District =

Historic district in New Mexico, United States

- U.S. National Register of Historic Places
- U.S. National Historic Landmark District
- NM State Register of Cultural Properties
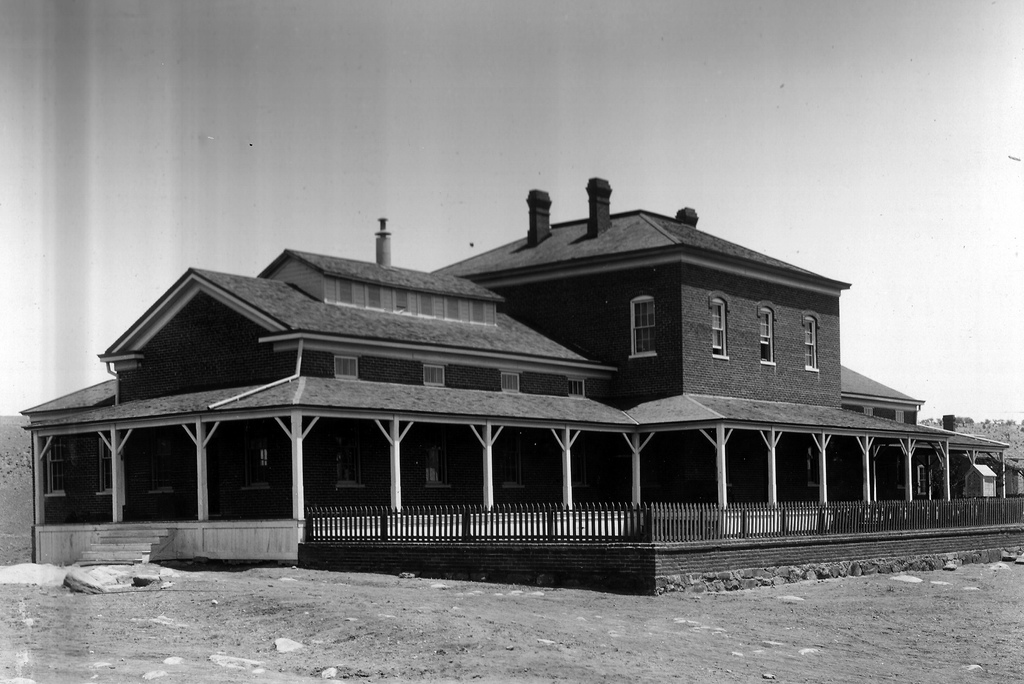
- Fort Bayard Post Hospital, circa 1890

- Location within New Mexico Location within the United States
- Nearest city: Santa Clara, New Mexico
- Coordinates: 32°47′47″N 108°8′56″W
- Area: 704 acres (285 ha)
- Built: 1866
- Architectural style: Classical Revival, Colonial Revival, et al.
- NRHP reference No.: 02000726
- NMSRCP No.: 1803

Significant dates
- Added to NRHP: July 7, 2002
- Designated NHLD: March 19, 2004
- Designated NMSRCP: July 20, 2001

The Fort Bayard Historic District encompasses the area that was the location of Fort Bayard, a United States Army military installation north of present-day Santa Clara, New Mexico. Founded in 1866, the fort at first provided security (mainly by African-American "Buffalo Soldiers") against Native American attacks on settlers during the settlement of the region in the 19th century. It was then converted into the army's first tuberculosis sanitarium, and later became a VA hospital. The property is now the Fort Bayard Medical Center, a long-term nursing care facility operated by the state of New Mexico. The only surviving 19th-century elements of the fort are some of its landscaping, and the Fort Bayard National Cemetery. The site was designated a National Historic Landmark District in 2004.

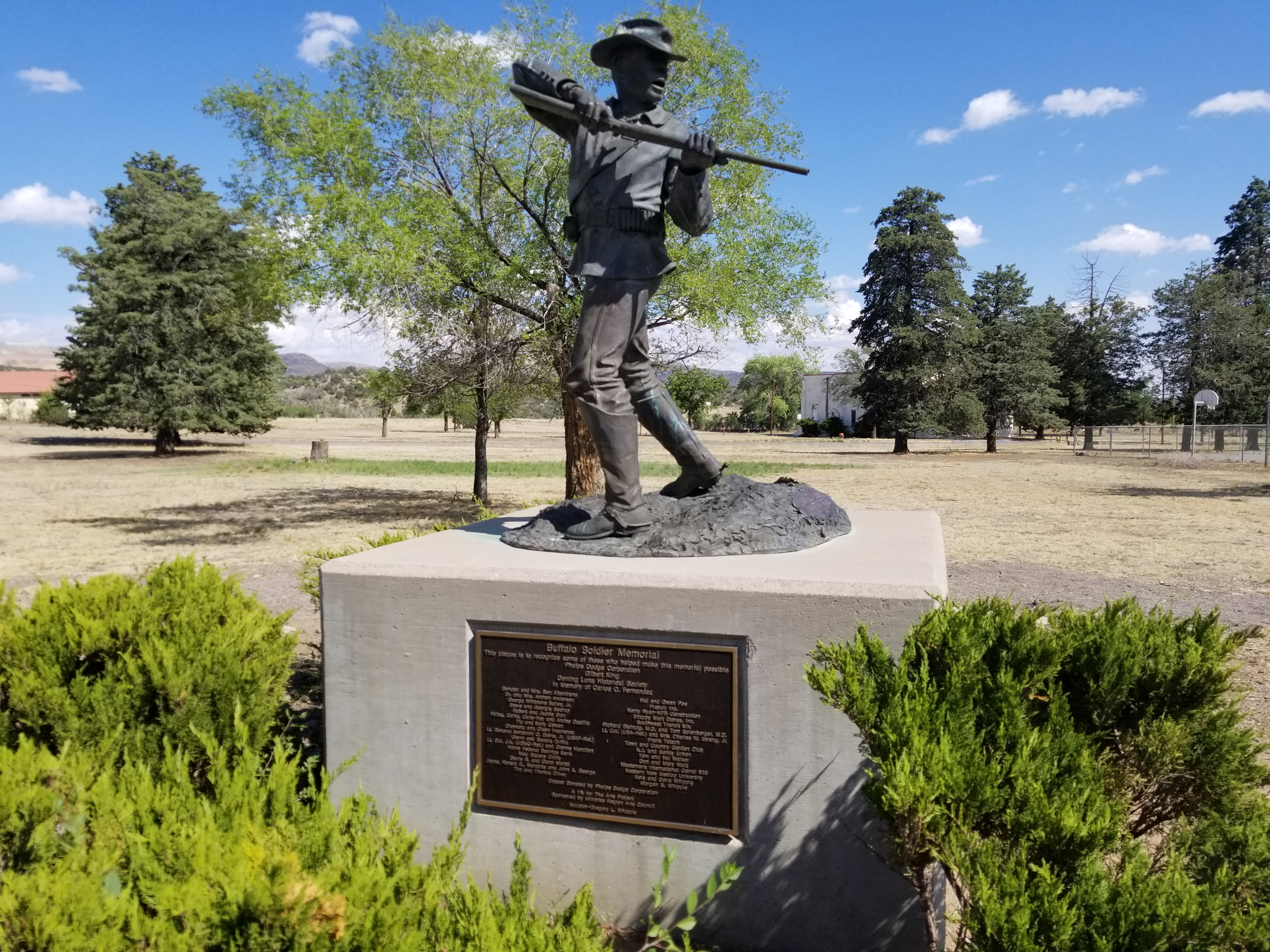

== History ==
Fort Bayard was established as a United States Army installation in 1866 to protect miners and other settlers in the area along the Apache Trail. The fort was named for Brigadier General George Dashiell Bayard, who was mortally wounded at the Battle of Fredericksburg in 1862. Fifteen square miles of land were set aside as the Fort Bayard Military Reservation by presidential order in 1869. In 1886, then-Second Lieutenant John Pershing arrived at Fort Bayard and oversaw the installation of a heliograph, linking the fort to an Army communications network from Arizona to Texas.

Fort Bayard was one of many installations throughout the Southwest that was garrisoned by the so-called Buffalo Soldiers. Company B of the 25th United States Colored Infantry Regiment established the post, and they were joined by other black units, including troops from the 9th Cavalry Regiment. Corporal Clinton Greaves, stationed at Fort Bayard with C Company, 9th Cavalry Regiment, received the Medal of Honor for his actions against Apache raiders on January 24, 1877. A monument to the Buffalo Soldiers was erected on the old parade field of Fort Bayard in 1992.

Following the capture of Geronimo in 1886, the Apache were no longer considered a major threat. Fort Bayard's continued usefulness, like that many posts in the southwest, thus came under scrutiny. Due to its distance from the border with Mexico, the fort was selected for deactivation. However, U.S. Army Surgeon General George Miller Sternberg, noting the excellent health record of the post, chose Fort Bayard as an Army tuberculosis hospital and research center (Lectures on tuberculosis made at the fort are archived at the National Library of Medicine). The fort was then transferred to the Surgeon General's department in 1900. In 1919 the Army turned the fort over to the U.S. Public Health Service to administer Hospital No. 55., a veterans' tuberculosis hospital. In 1922 the hospital became the part of the Veterans Bureau.

The fort was partially reactivated as a military installation during World War II. A number of German prisoners of war were held at the fort from 1943 to 1945. The fort is now administered by the New Mexico Department of Health as Fort Bayard Medical Center, a long-term care nursing facility that also contains a chemical dependency treatment center.

Fort Bayard is located 0.5 miles (800 m) north of the intersection of United States Route 180 and New Mexico State Road 152, near Bayard, New Mexico.

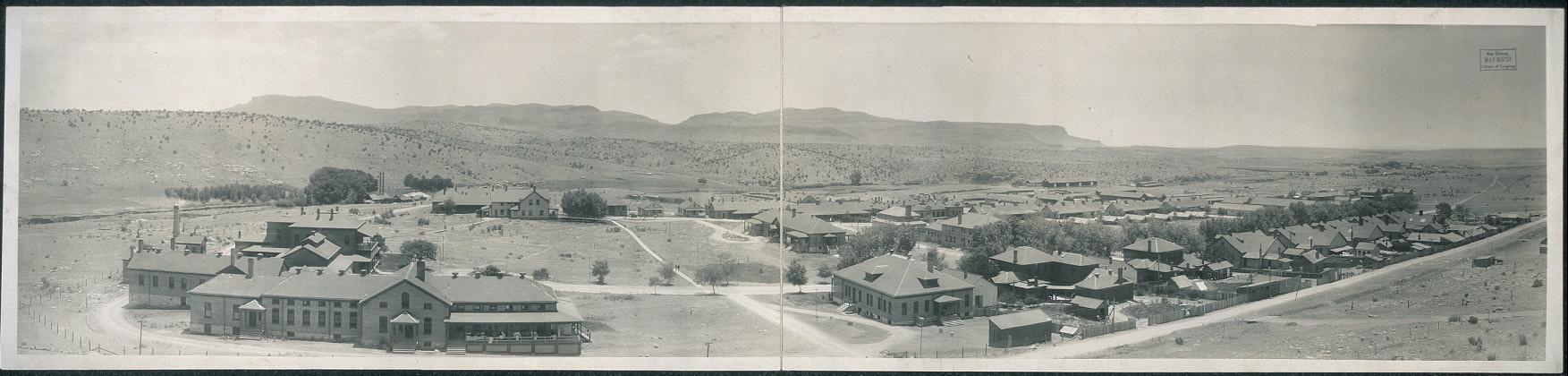
The fort c. 1909

== Notable soldiers stationed at Fort Bayard ==
- General George Crook, circa 1885
- Colonel Walter Loving
- Then-Colonel Clarence R. Edwards, 1906
- Then-Second Lt. John J. "Black Jack" Pershing, circa 1886
- Sergeant James C. Cooney
- Clinton Greaves, Corporal, Medal of Honor, circa 1877

== See also ==
- Fort Bayard National Cemetery
- Buffalo Soldier
- National Register of Historic Places listings in Grant County, New Mexico
- List of National Historic Landmarks in New Mexico
