= Bayard, New Mexico =

- city
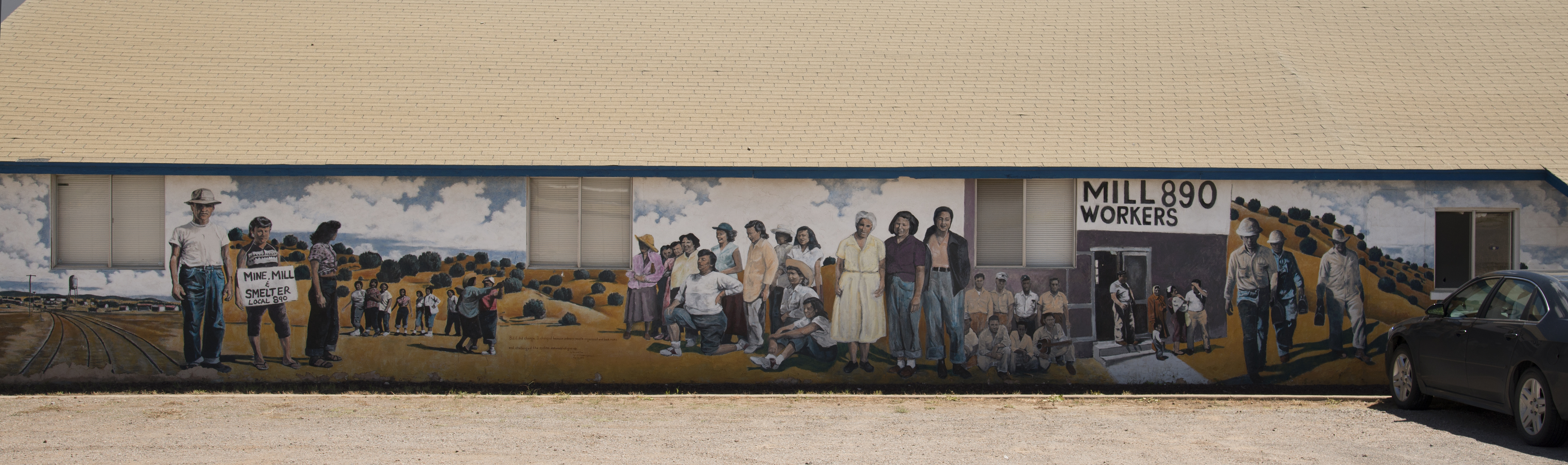
- mural about the Empire Zinc strike
- Motto: "Hub of the Mining District"
- Location of Bayard, New Mexico

- Location in New Mexico Bayard (the United States) Bayard (North America)
- Coordinates: 32°45′34″N 108°07′58″W
- Country: United States
- State: New Mexico
- County: Grant

Government
  - Type: Mayor–council government
  - Mayor: Rodolpho S. Martinez

Area
  - Total: 0.95 sq mi (2.47 km^{2})
  - Land: 0.95 sq mi (2.46 km^{2})
  - Water: 0.0039 sq mi (0.01 km^{2})
- Elevation: 5,807 ft (1,770 m)

Population (2020)
  - Total: 2,116
  - Density: 2,225.7/sq mi (859.36/km^{2})
- Time zone: UTC-7 (Mountain (MST))
  - Summer (DST): UTC-6 (MDT)
- ZIP code: 88023
- Area code: 575
- FIPS code: 35-06270
- GNIS feature ID: 2409799
- Website: www.cityofbayardnm.gov

Bayard is a city in Grant County, New Mexico, United States. It is near Santa Rita, east of Silver City. The population was 2,116 at the 2020 census.

== Geography ==
It is located in east-central Grant County. According to the United States Census Bureau, the town has a total area of 0.95 square miles (2.45 km^{2}), all land. The city is in the valley of Whitewater Creek, a seasonal south-flowing tributary of the Mimbres River.

U.S. Route 180 passes through Bayard as Tom Foy Boulevard and Central Avenue, leading northwest 2 miles (3 km) to Santa Clara and 9 miles (14 km) to Silver City, and south 42 miles (68 km) to Deming and Interstate 10. New Mexico State Road 356 leads northeast from Bayard 5 miles (8 km) up the Whitewater Creek valley to Hanover.

Bayard is located in the southern foothills of the Pinos Altos Range and Mogollon Mountains in the southwestern portion of New Mexico and situated east of the Continental Divide at an elevation of approximately 5,800 feet (1,800 m). Gila National Forest lies north from here. A semi-arid desert of predominantly grasses and yucca is in Bayard's southern portion.

== Demographics ==
Historical population
Census	Pop.	Note	%±
1940	764		—
1950	2,119		177.4%
1960	2,327		9.8%
1970	2,908		25.0%
1980	3,036		4.4%
1990	2,598		−14.4%
2000	2,534		−2.5%
2010	2,328		−8.1%
2020	2,116		−9.1%
U.S. Decennial Census

=== 2020 census ===
As of the 2020 census, Bayard had a population of 2,116. The median age was 40.9 years. 25.3% of residents were under the age of 18 and 22.3% of residents were 65 years of age or older. For every 100 females there were 86.8 males, and for every 100 females age 18 and over there were 82.8 males age 18 and over.

100.0% of residents lived in urban areas, while 0.0% lived in rural areas.

There were 865 households in Bayard, of which 31.9% had children under the age of 18 living in them. Of all households, 36.9% were married-couple households, 19.0% were households with a male householder and no spouse or partner present, and 35.8% were households with a female householder and no spouse or partner present. About 30.8% of all households were made up of individuals and 15.0% had someone living alone who was 65 years of age or older.

There were 1,031 housing units, of which 16.1% were vacant. The homeowner vacancy rate was 2.7% and the rental vacancy rate was 9.0%.

Racial composition as of the 2020 census
Race	Number	Percent
White	1,057	50.0%
Black or African American	18	0.9%
American Indian and Alaska Native	67	3.2%
Asian	5	0.2%
Native Hawaiian and Other Pacific Islander	0	0.0%
Some other race	386	18.2%
Two or more races	583	27.6%
Hispanic or Latino (of any race)	1,709	80.8%

=== 2000 census ===
As of the census of 2000, there were 2,534 people, 970 households, and 719 families residing in the town. The population density was 2,916.4 inhabitants per square mile (1,126.0/km^{2}). There were 1,100 housing units at an average density of 1,266.0 per square mile (488.8/km^{2}). The racial makeup of the town was 65.67% White, 0.32% African American, 1.66% Native American, 0.04% Asian, 29.04% from other races, and 3.28% from two or more races. Hispanic or Latino of any race were 84.33% of the population.

There were 970 households, out of which 34.3% had children under the age of 18 living with them, 51.1% were married couples living together, 18.5% had a female householder with no husband present, and 25.8% were non-families. 23.6% of all households were made up of individuals, and 13.4% had someone living alone who was 65 years of age or older. The average household size was 2.61 and the average family size was 3.07.

In the town the population was spread out, with 29.2% under the age of 18, 8.5% from 18 to 24, 22.1% from 25 to 44, 23.3% from 45 to 64, and 16.9% who were 65 years of age or older. The median age was 37 years. For every 100 females, there were 87.4 males. For every 100 females age 18 and over, there were 83.0 males.

The median income for a household in the town was $21,957, and the median income for a family was $27,632. Males had a median income of $30,200 versus $17,132 for females. The per capita income for the town was $11,066. About 19.7% of families and 24.1% of the population were below the poverty line, including 33.8% of those under age 18 and 14.3% of those age 65 or over.

== See also ==
- List of municipalities in New Mexico
- Fort Bayard Historic District
- Fort Bayard National Cemetery
