= Clinton Greaves =

American Buffalo Soldier and Medal of Honor recipient

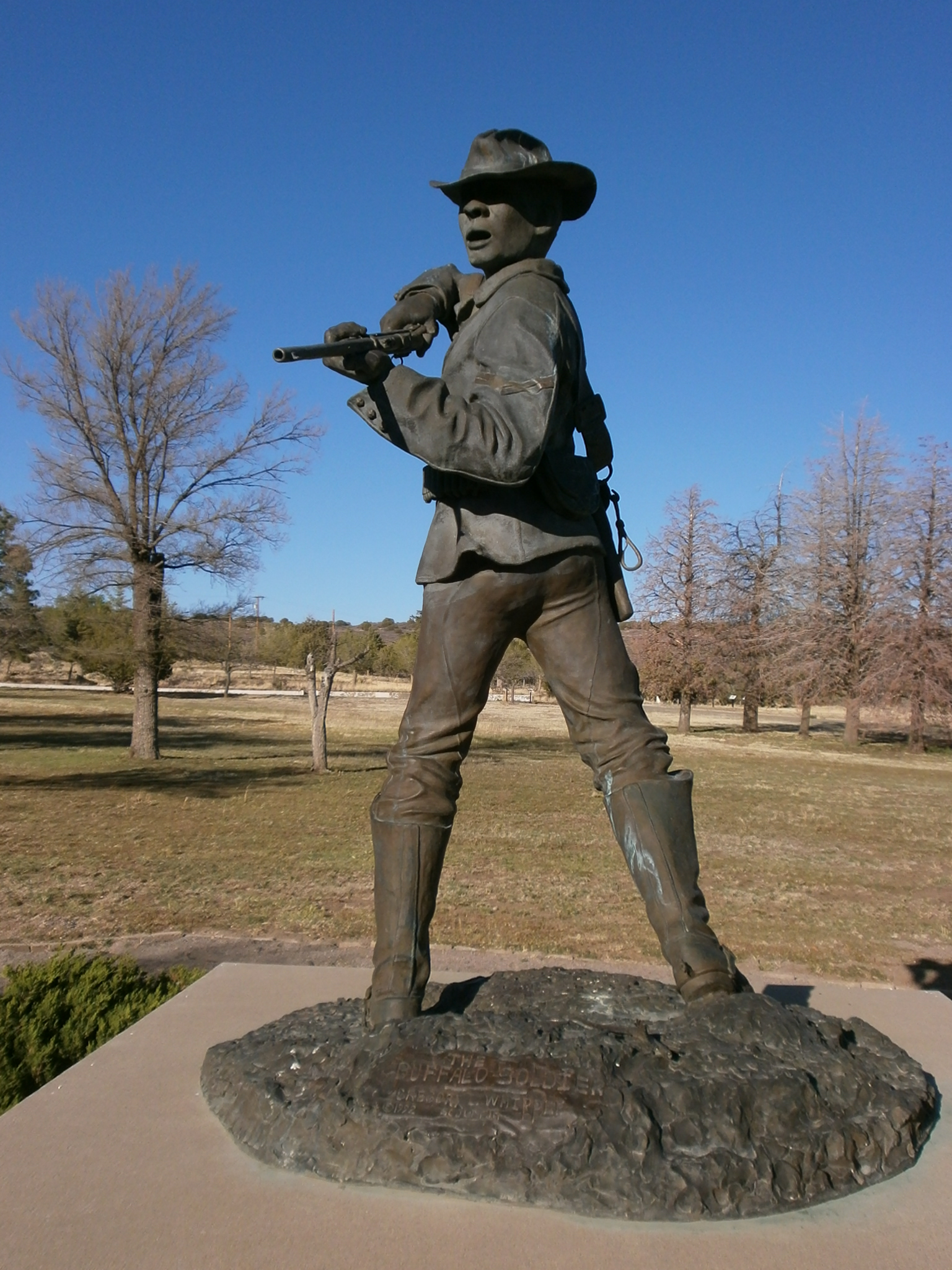
- Clinton Greaves statue at Fort Bayard, New Mexico
- Born: August 12, 1855; Madison County, Virginia, US
- Died: August 18, 1906 (aged 51)
- Burial place: Green Lawn Cemetery, Columbus, Ohio
- Military career
- Allegiance: United States
- Branch: United States Army
- Service years: 1872–1893
- Rank: Sergeant
- Unit: 9th Cavalry Regiment
- Conflicts: American Indian Wars
- Awards: Medal of Honor

Clinton Greaves (August 12, 1855 – August 18, 1906) was a Buffalo Soldier in the United States Army and a recipient of America's highest military decoration—the Medal of Honor—for his actions in the Indian Wars of the western United States.

== Biography ==
Greaves was born in Madison County, Virginia on August 12, 1855. He joined the Army from Prince George's County, Maryland in September 1872, and by January 24, 1877, was serving as a corporal in Company C of the 9th Cavalry Regiment. On that day, Greaves was part of a detachment which participated in an engagement in the Florida Mountains of New Mexico against Apaches. The engagement started as a negotiation, but turned violent. Greaves shot his carbine until he was out of rounds, and then used his carbine as a club. Five Apaches died and Greaves' group escaped through the opening Greaves made. For his actions during the battle, he was awarded the Medal of Honor two years later, on June 26, 1879.

Greaves served in the army for over 20 years, and had reached the rank of Sergeant upon his discharge in 1893. After his army service, he worked as a civilian for the Quartermaster Department. He died of heart disease at age 51 and was buried at Green Lawn Cemetery (Columbus, Ohio).

== Medal of Honor citation ==
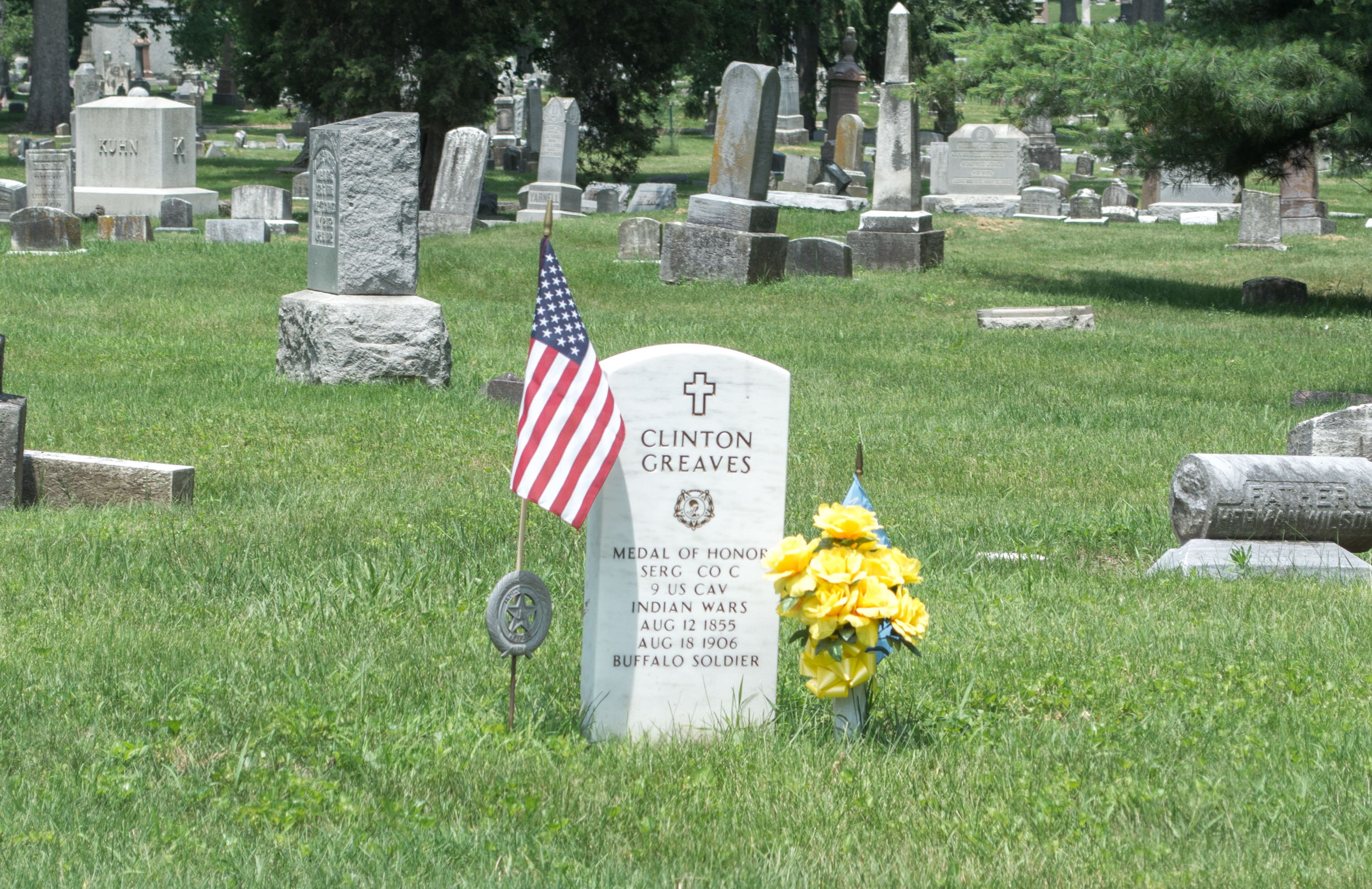
Grave at Green Lawn Cemetery, Columbus, Ohio

Rank and organization: Corporal, Company C, 9th U.S. Cavalry. Place and date: At Florida Mountains, N. Mex., January 24, 1877. Entered service at: Prince George's County, Md. Birth: Madison County, Va. Date of issue: June 26, 1879.

Citation:

While part of a small detachment to persuade a band of renegade Apache Indians to surrender, his group was surrounded. Cpl. Greaves in the center of the savage hand-to-hand fighting, managed to shoot and bash a gap through the swarming Apaches, permitting his companions to break free.

== Namesake ==
Camp Greaves, a US Army installation located near the Demilitarized Zone (DMZ) in the Republic of Korea (South Korea), is named in honor of Sergeant (SGT) Greaves.

== See also ==
- List of Medal of Honor recipients
- List of Medal of Honor recipients for the Indian Wars
- List of African American Medal of Honor recipients
