= Hanover, New Mexico =

- Census-designated place
- Location within New Mexico Location within the United States
- Coordinates: 32°48′53″N 108°05′23″W
- Country: United States
- State: New Mexico
- County: Grant

Area
  - Total: 1.40 sq mi (3.62 km^{2})
  - Land: 1.40 sq mi (3.62 km^{2})
  - Water: 0 sq mi (0.00 km^{2})
- Elevation: 6,375 ft (1,943 m)

Population (2020)
  - Total: 144
  - Density: 103.1/sq mi (39.79/km^{2})
- Time zone: UTC-7 (Mountain (MST))
  - Summer (DST): UTC-6 (MDT)
- ZIP code: 88041
- Area code: 575
- GNIS feature ID: 2584107

Hanover is a census-designated place in Grant County, New Mexico, United States. As of the 2020 census, Hanover had a population of 144. Hanover has a post office with ZIP code 88041. New Mexico State Road 152 and New Mexico State Road 356 pass through the community. The town was named after the local Hanover Mines. Sofio Henkel, one of the original settlers, came from Hanover, Germany, in 1841 and mined until 1843, when he was driven away by Apaches.

== Demographics ==
Historical population
Census	Pop.	Note	%±
2020	144		—
U.S. Decennial Census
