= Smith Brothers Farms =

Agricultural company in Washington, US

Coordinates: 47°21′53″N 122°14′9″W

Smith Brothers
- Founded: 1920; 106 years ago
- Founder: Benjamin Smith
- Headquarters: Kent, Washington
- Area served: Puget Sound Region
- Website: smithbrothersfarms.com

Smith Brothers is a dairy and home delivery service based in Kent, Washington, United States.

== Farm Beginnings ==
Smith Brothers was established in 1920 by Benjamin Smith who had a couple of Holstein cows that he milked by hand. The dairy now delivers to more than 60,000 homes around the Puget Sound region, including Seattle, Olympia, and Everett and the greater Portland metro area.

== Transition to Processing ==
In 2001, their herd eventually outgrew the pastures in Kent and Snohomish and were moved to Grant County in Eastern Washington. Due to federal regulations in 2006, Smith Brothers sold their cows and farm in Royal City. The same year, added additional grocery delivery beyond milk and dairy products. In August 2013, the dairy moved from their original location of 93 years on West Valley Highway to their current headquarters and milk-processing facility in Kent, Washington. The land was sold to Carpinito Brothers where it has since remained a farm.

== Alpenrose Acquisition ==
In 2019, Smith Brothers acquired the dairy operations of Oregon-based Alpenrose Dairy but the sale did not include Alpenrose’s property of more than 50 acres of land on Shattuck Road.

== Current Operations ==
Since selling the herd, the milk is sourced from co-ops around Washington state, which is then pasteurized, homogenized, and packed at their plant in Kent. Their 50,000 square foot dairy facility includes equipment that can produce up to 60,000 gallons of milk a day. Before it was a dairy production facility, it was a Heinz frozen soup factory.

In addition to their Kent location, Smith Brothers has distribution depots in Federal Way, Woodinville and Tacoma.

== Awards ==
Smith Brothers was awarded Plant of the Year in 2014 from Dairy Foods.
