= Abati, Iran =

Abati اباطي
- Village
- Location within Iran
- Coordinates: 38°25′27″N 44°51′10″E
- Country: Iran
- Province: West Azerbaijan
- County: Khoy
- Bakhsh: Central
- Rural District: Rahal

Population (2006)
  - Total: 85
- Time zone: UTC+3:30 (IRST)
  - Summer (DST): UTC+4:30 (IRDT)

Abati (Persian: اباطي, also Romanized as Ābāţī and Ābātī) is a village in Rahal Rural District, in the Central District of Khoy County, West Azerbaijan Province, Iran. At the 2006 census, its population was 85, in 22 families.
