= Alpenrose Dairy =

Agricultural company in Oregon, US

Coordinates: 45°28′47″N 122°44′26″W

- Company type: Private
- Industry: Agriculture
- Founded: 1891; 135 years ago
- Founder: Florian Cadonau
- Headquarters: Portland, Oregon, US
- Area served: Oregon and Washington
- Website: Official website

Alpenrose Dairy is an American brand of dairy products and former manufacturer and home delivery company. Alpenrose was headquartered on their 52 acre namesake dairy facility in Portland, Oregon until 2019, and in 2022, the brand was sold to Smith Brothers Farms. Alpenrose products are still sold by Smith Brothers Farms, primarily through their home delivery service.

== History ==
The brand was named after the alpine rose (Rosa pendulina) by the Swiss-born wife and early co-owner of the dairy. Alpenrose is a "supplier of dairy products to retail, wholesale and ingredient customers in Portland and throughout the Northwest". In 2020, addressing the growing demand for delivery services the company introduced Alpenrose Home Delivery, a weekly grocery delivery service that provided customers with Alpenrose brand dairy products and other locally made grocery items. Deliveries were facilitated by the company's fleet of milkmen and milkwomen, who delivered groceries by neighborhood and were unique to the service.

In 2022, Alpenrose was sold to Kent, Washington based Smith Brothers Farms, another dairy company specializing in home delivery service. Smith Brothers still sells some milk products under the Alpenrose label.

== Dairy grounds ==
The 52 acres (21 ha) grounds of the dairy include:

- Circuit d'Alpenrose, a velodrome, one of only 25 such tracks in the United States. The track was built to host the 1967 National Championships. At 268.43 meters around with a 16.6-metre (54 ft) radius and a 43-degree bank, Alpenrose is one of the steepest velodromes in the country. Alpenrose is home to the only North American Six-day race. It hosts races all summer, and annually draws the largest velodrome crowd in North America for the Alpenrose Challenge, in mid-July.

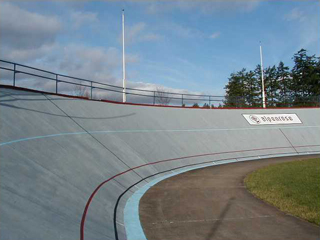
Alpenrose Velodrome

- Alpenrose Field, the site of baseball and softball games, including Little League Softball World Series games, from 1956 to 2019.
- Dairyville, a replica of a western frontier town, with false-front shops, a doll museum, an ice cream parlor, a harness-maker's store, a music shop, and a 600-seat opera house with a pipe organ (with 4000 pipes).
- A quarter-midget racing arena. The velodrome was permanently closed to the public in 2021. With little hope of reopening.

Products from Alpenrose include milk, ice cream, eggs, and various cultured dairy products.

=== Dairyville ===
Dairyville was added to Alpenrose sometime in the 1960s. As stated above, the replica frontier town consists of a few streets of false front stores, a doll museum, an ice cream parlor, a music shop and a 600-seat opera house. The theater's pipe organ was salvaged from the Portland Civic Auditorium. Dairyville is typically open to the public on holidays and during the summer months.

For decades, Dairyville has hosted an annual holiday event called "Christmas in Dairyville". In addition to a gift shop and a house where children can have their photos taken with Santa Claus, there's also "Storybook Lane", an elaborate, walk-through attraction. Visitors wander through a snowy, moonlit mock-village inhabited by farm animals and displays based on Mother Goose's fables. The attraction also includes a tiny fire station for kids to play in. Elsewhere on the property, choir groups from local schools perform. Dairyville's opera house also hosts nightly screenings of comedy shorts featuring The Three Stooges and Laurel and Hardy, along with more contemporary entertainment like the 2004 film adaptation of The Polar Express. The event ended its annual run in 2005 but returned again for the 2011 Christmas season.

Dairyville's assets were auctioned off in 2020 and several of the items remain in the public view. Some of the iconic red/gold carriages pulled by miniature horses in parades were bought and restored by Nob Hill Christmas Historical Society and now walk in the annual Starlight Parade, in addition several rows of seats from the Theater and reels of film from the Theater are publicly made available in Christmas time at the Nob Hill storage facility to enjoy a short from Shirley Temple or 3 Stooges . The Calliope that clown Rusty Nails would walk with in the Parade was bought by the son of the wagons original builder. Later in 2021 it was sold to a local collector to be preserved and displayed locally. The houses from Storybook Lane were bought by 2 parties, one private collector in Sandy Oregon as well as the Nob Hill Christmas Historical Society.

=== Lawsuit ===
On March 4, 2019, a lawsuit was filed in Multnomah County Circuit Court by three members of the Cadonau family against two other family members, alleging they are planning to sell the dairy and immediately stop all community events at Alpenrose. The family has since settled differences and dropped the lawsuit. In February 2021 the property was closed to events and all other uses.

=== Future development ===
Lennar Northwest, Inc, represented by Westlake Consultants, Inc. submitted a "preapplication concept" for developing the Alpenrose property. The application "proposes a 193-lot single-family detached residential land division".

The proposal includes:

- Pre-application project summary.
- Land Division Preapplication Meeting -- Applicant Questions (May 18, 2021)
- Land Division Preapplication Concept (map)
- Early Assistance application
- Notice of a Pre-Application Conference (held June 17, 2021)
- Pre-Application Conference report (dated August 4, 2021)
