= Fort Bayard National Cemetery =

Historic veterans cemetery in Grant County, New Mexico

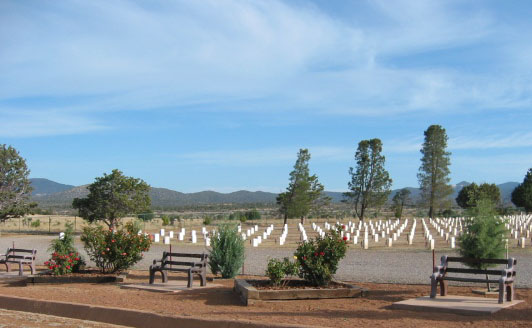
- Fort Bayard National Cemetery
- Interactive map of Fort Bayard National Cemetery

Details
- Established: 1866
- Location: Fort Bayard, New Mexico
- Country: United States
- Coordinates: 32°47′55″N 108°09′17″W
- Type: United States National Cemetery
- Size: 18.8 acres (7.6 ha)
- No. of interments: 6,000 (as 2021)
- Find a Grave: Fort Bayard National Cemetery

Fort Bayard National Cemetery is a United States National Cemetery in the Fort Bayard Historic District, near Silver City, New Mexico. It encompasses 18.8 acres (7.6 ha), and as of the end of 2020, had 6,000 interments. It is one of two national cemeteries in New Mexico (the other being Santa Fe), and is administered by Santa Fe National Cemetery.

== History ==
Fort Bayard was established as a United States Army installation in 1866 to protect miners and other settlers in the area along the Apache Trail. The first interment in the cemetery was made the same year the post was founded. The fort was named after Brigadier General George Dashiell Bayard, who was mortally wounded at the Battle of Fredericksburg in 1862. Fifteen square miles of land were set aside as the Fort Bayard Military Reservation by presidential order in 1869. In 1886, then-Second Lieutenant John Pershing arrived at Fort Bayard and oversaw the installation of a heliograph, linking the fort to an Army communications network from Arizona to Texas.

Fort Bayard was one of many installations throughout the Southwest that was garrisoned by the so-called Buffalo Soldiers. Company B of the 25th United States Colored Infantry Regiment established the post, and they were joined by other black units, including troops from the 9th Cavalry Regiment. Corporal Clinton Greaves, stationed at Fort Bayard with C Company, 9th Cavalry Regiment, received the Medal of Honor for his actions against Apache raiders on January 24, 1877. A monument to the Buffalo Soldiers was erected on the old parade field of Fort Bayard in 1992.

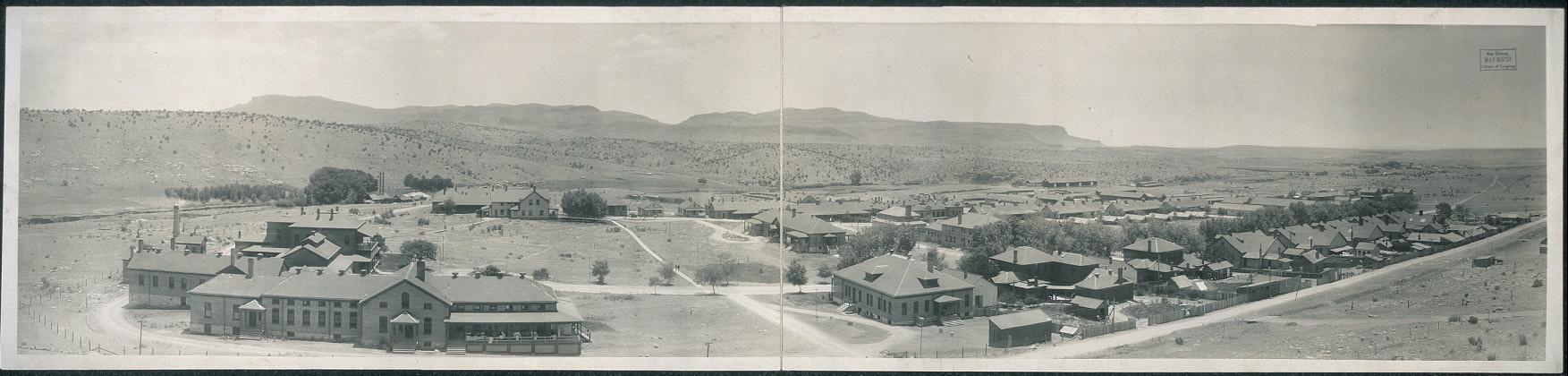
Fort Bayard, New Mexico (ca. 1909)

Following the capture of Geronimo in 1886, the Apache were no longer considered a major threat. Fort Bayard's continued usefulness, like that many posts in the southwest, thus came under scrutiny. Due to its distance from the border with Mexico, the fort was selected for deactivation. However, U.S. Army Surgeon General George Miller Sternberg, noting the excellent health record of the post, chose Fort Bayard as an Army tuberculosis hospital and research center. The fort was transferred to the Surgeon General's Department in 1900. In 1922 the hospital became the part of the Veteran's Administration, and the cemetery officially became Fort Bayard National Cemetery.

The fort was partially reactivated as a military installation during World War II. A number of German prisoners of war were held at the fort from 1943 to 1945. The fort is now administered by the New Mexico Department of Health as Fort Bayard Medical Center, a long term care nursing facility that also contains a chemical dependency treatment center. A federal investigation of Fort Bayard Medical Center in 2006 found significant human rights violations.

Fort Bayard Cemetery became part of the National Cemetery system in 1973. In the 1990s the state of New Mexico donated an additional 4 acres (1.6 ha) to the cemetery. Fort Bayard National Cemetery was placed on the National Register of Historic Places on July 7, 2002, as a part of the Fort Bayard Historic District.

== Notable interments ==
- Sergeant Alonzo Bowman (1848–1885), Medal of Honor recipient for actions in Arizona Territory during the Indian Wars.
- Wagoner John Schnitzer (1854–1904), Medal of Honor recipient for actions in New Mexico Territory during the Indian Wars.
