= Robinson, Texas =

- City
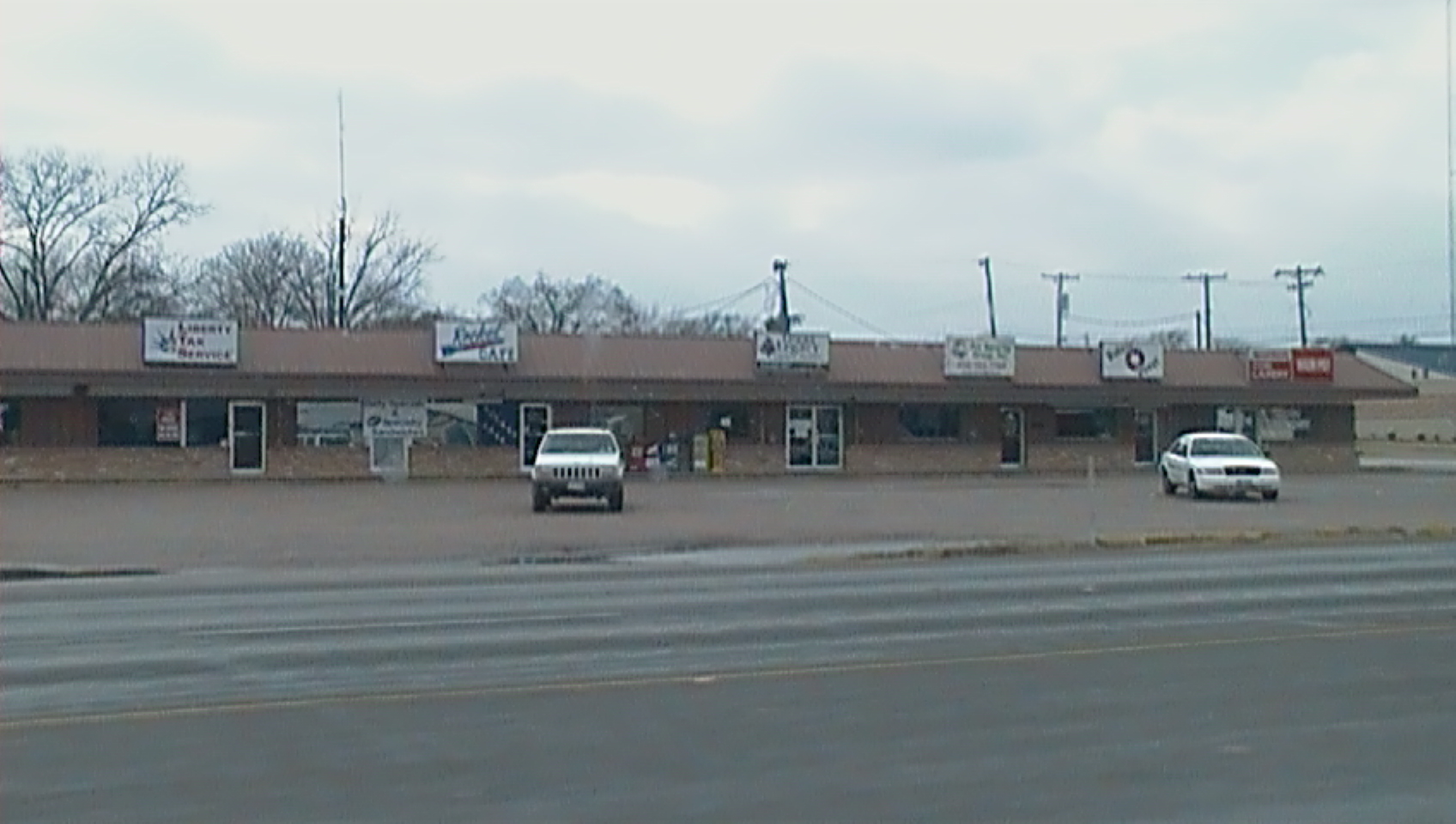
- This shopping center in Robinson contains several businesses.
- Motto: "Rockets Never Quit!"
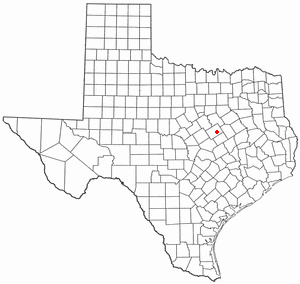
- Location of Robinson, Texas

- Coordinates: 31°28′54″N 97°07′40″W
- Country: United States
- State: Texas
- County: McLennan
- Named for: John and Levi Robinson

Area
  - Total: 31.58 sq mi (81.80 km^{2})
  - Land: 31.25 sq mi (80.95 km^{2})
  - Water: 0.33 sq mi (0.85 km^{2})
- Elevation: 466 ft (142 m)

Population (2020)
  - Total: 12,443
  - Density: 381.6/sq mi (147.32/km^{2})
- Time zone: UTC-6 (Central (CST))
  - Summer (DST): UTC-5 (CDT)
- ZIP code: 76706
- Area code: 254
- FIPS code: 48-62588
- GNIS feature ID: 2410972
- Website: www.robinsontexas.org

Robinson is a city in McLennan County, Texas, United States. The population was 12,443 at the 2020 census. It is part of the Waco Metropolitan Statistical Area.

== Demographics ==
Historical population
Census	Pop.	Note	%±
1960	2,111		—
1970	3,807		80.3%
1980	6,074		59.5%
1990	7,111		17.1%
2000	7,845		10.3%
2010	10,509		34.0%
2020	12,443		18.4%
U.S. Decennial Census

=== 2020 census ===
As of the 2020 census, Robinson had a population of 12,443. The median age was 38.1 years. 25.9% of residents were under the age of 18 and 15.9% of residents were 65 years of age or older. For every 100 females there were 96.7 males, and for every 100 females age 18 and over there were 92.5 males age 18 and over.

65.9% of residents lived in urban areas, while 34.1% lived in rural areas.

There were 4,406 households in Robinson, of which 38.9% had children under the age of 18 living in them. Of all households, 62.1% were married-couple households, 11.7% were households with a male householder and no spouse or partner present, and 21.1% were households with a female householder and no spouse or partner present. About 16.2% of all households were made up of individuals and 7.8% had someone living alone who was 65 years of age or older.

There were 4,671 housing units, of which 5.7% were vacant. The homeowner vacancy rate was 1.8% and the rental vacancy rate was 5.2%.

Racial composition as of the 2020 census
Race	Number	Percent
White	9,504	76.4%
Black or African American	607	4.9%
American Indian and Alaska Native	100	0.8%
Asian	109	0.9%
Native Hawaiian and Other Pacific Islander	11	0.1%
Some other race	741	6.0%
Two or more races	1,371	11.0%
Hispanic or Latino (of any race)	2,292	18.4%

=== 2000 census ===
As of the 2000 census, 7,845 people, 2,828 households, and 2,330 families resided in the city, while the primary Robinson zip code 76706 (which includes students at Baylor University) was 29,449. The population density was 248.6 inhabitants per square mile (96.0/km^{2}). There were 2,942 housing units at an average density of 93.2 per square mile (36.0/km^{2}). The racial makeup of the city was 91.75% White, 2.09% African American, 0.38% Native American, 0.48% Asian, 0.01% Pacific Islander, 4.27% from other races, and 1.01% from two or more races. Hispanics or Latinos of any race were 9.00% of the population.

Of the 2,828 households, 37.3% had children under the age of 18 living with them, 70.2% were married couples living together, 9.6% had a female householder with no husband present, and 17.6% were not families. About 15.4% of all households were made up of individuals, and 8.2% had someone living alone who was 65 years of age or older. The average household size was 2.77 and the average family size was 3.07.

In the city, the population was distributed as 26.5% under the age of 18, 6.7% from 18 to 24, 26.6% from 25 to 44, 25.9% from 45 to 64, and 14.4% who were 65 years of age or older. The median age was 39 years. For every 100 females, there were 94.0 males. For every 100 females age 18 and over, there were 91.1 males.

The median income for a household in the city was $49,404, and for a family was $51,953. Males had a median income of $35,718 versus $23,623 for females. The per capita income for the city was $21,680. About 3.6% of families and 4.4% of the population were below the poverty line, including 4.0% of those under age 18 and 6.6% of those age 65 or over.

== Education ==
Robinson is served by the Robinson Independent School District, Waco Independent School District, and Midway Independent School District

== Notable people ==
- Jason Tucker, who played for the Dallas Cowboys, grew up in Robinson and graduated from Robinson High School
- Braxton Ashcraft, a pitcher plays for the Pittsburgh Pirates, attended Robinson High School.
