= Neocorini =

Scientific classification
- Kingdom: Animalia
- Phylum: Arthropoda
- Class: Insecta
- Order: Coleoptera
- Suborder: Polyphaga
- Infraorder: Cucujiformia
- Family: Cerambycidae
- Subfamily: Cerambycinae
- Tribe: Neocorini; Martins, 2005

Tribe of beetles

Neocorini is a tribe of typical longhorn beetles in the family Cerambycidae. There are about 7 genera and more than 20 described species in Neocorini.

== Genera ==
These seven genera belong to the tribe Neocorini:

- Aleiphaquilon Martins, 1970
- Coscinedes Bates, 1885
- Fregolia Gounelle, 1911
- Marauna Martins & Galileo, 2006
- Myrmeocorus Martins, 1975
- Neocoridolon Melzer, 1930
- Neocorus Thomson, 1864
