= Eng (name) =

- Language: Chinese (Cantonese, Southern Min), German, Norwegian, Swedish

Other names
- Variant forms: Chinese: Ng, Ing, Ong, Ung; German: Enge

Eng is a Chinese, German, and Scandinavian surname, as well as a given name in various cultures.

== Given name ==
- Eng Abner Nangwale (1932–2013), Ugandan politician
- Eng Bunker (1811–1874), Siamese-American conjoined twin brother of Chang Bunker
- Chong Eng (章瑛; born 1974), Malaysian politician
- Eng Tow (杜瑛; born 1947), Singaporean contemporary artist

== Surname ==
=== Origins ===
Eng may be the spelling of multiple Chinese surnames, based on their pronunciation in different varieties of Chinese; they are listed below by their spelling in Hanyu Pinyin, which reflects the standard Mandarin pronunciation:

- Wú (吳), spelled Eng based on its Cantonese pronunciation (Jyutping: Ng4)
- Wǔ (伍), spelled Eng based on its Cantonese pronunciation (Jyutping: Ng5)
- Róng (榮/荣), spelled Eng based on its Hokkien pronunciation (Pe̍h-ōe-jī: Êng)
- Wēng (翁), spelled Eng based on its Teochew pronunciation (Peng'im: Êng^{1})
- Yīng (應), spelled Eng based on its pronunciation in various Southern Min dialects (e.g. Hokkien Pe̍h-ōe-jī: Eng; Teochew Peng'im: Êng^{3})

Ng is another spelling of the Cantonese pronunciation of the first two surnames listed above. Chinese Americans in the Pacific Northwest tended to prefer the spelling Eng over Ng. The Cambodian surname Eng (អេង) probably originates from the latter three surnames mentioned above.

As a German surname, Eng is a variant spelling of Enge, a topographic surname for a person who lived in a valley or other such narrow place, from German eng 'narrow'.

The Norwegian and Swedish surname Eng originated as an ornamental surname from Old Norse eng and Swedish äng 'meadow'.

=== Statistics ===
As of 2023, there were 910 people in Norway with the surname Eng.

The 2010 United States census found 10,862 people with the surname Eng, making it the 3,352nd-most-common name in the country. This represented an increase from 10,102 (3,246th-most-common) in the 2000 census. In both censuses, roughly three-quarters of the bearers of the surname identified as Asian and 14% as non-Hispanic white. It was the 179th-most-common surname among respondents to the 2000 census who identified as Asian.

=== People ===
==== Politics and government ====
- Brynolf Eng (1910–1988), Swedish diplomat
- Eng Chhai Eang (អេង ឆៃអ៊ាង; born 1965), Cambodian politician
- Hans Eng (1907–1995), Norwegian physician and Nazi collaborator
- Hughes Eng (fl. 1959–present), Chinese-born Canadian activist
- Jakob Eng (1937–2022), Norwegian banker and politician
- John Eng (born 1942), American politician of Chinese descent in Washington State
- Mike Eng (伍國慶; born 1946), American politician of Chinese descent in California
- Suriani Abdullah (birth name Eng Ming Ching; 1924–2013), former central committee member of the Communist Party of Malaya
- Phillip Eng, American transit executive
- Randall T. Eng (born 1947), mainland Chinese-born American jurist
- Roland Eng (born 1959), Cambodian diplomat
- Susan Eng (伍素屏; fl. 1974–present), Canadian lawyer of Chinese descent, former chair of the Metro Toronto Police Services Board
- Sigrun Eng (born 1951), Norwegian politician

==== Sport ====
- Bertil Eng (1930–2006), Swedish speed skater
- Jacob Eng (born 2004), Norwegian football striker
- Martin Eng (born 1986), Norwegian biathlete
- Philipp Eng (born 1990), Austrian racing driver
- Tony Eng (born 1959), Swedish curler

==== Television and film ====
- Dayyan Eng (伍仕賢; born 1975), Taiwan-born American filmmaker
- Esther Eng (伍錦霞; 1914–1970), American filmmaker of Chinese descent
- Kenneth Eng (fl. 1994–present), American filmmaker of Chinese descent
- Marny Eng (born 1969), Canadian stuntwoman
- Peppe Eng (born 1948), Swedish sports journalist
- Vickie Eng (fl. 1990–present), American actress

==== Other ====
- Charis Eng (1962–2024), Singaporean-born American geneticist
- Diana Eng (born 1983), American fashion designer of Chinese descent
- Helga Eng (1875–1966), Norwegian psychologist and educationalist
- Janice J Eng (born 1963), Canadian neurologist
- Johnny Eng (伍少衡; born c. 1958), Hong Kong-born American criminal
- Mercedes Eng (fl. 2010–present), Canadian writer of Chinese descent
- Phoebe Eng (born c. 1961), American writer of Chinese descent
- Richard Eng (伍經衡; born 1964), Hong Kong tutor of English
- Trista Elizabeth Eng (1976–1993), Asian-American murder victim
