= Yung (surname) =

- Language: Chinese, English, German

Origin
- Region of origin: China, former Soviet Union, England, Scotland

Other names
- Variant forms: Chinese: Rong, Weng, Yang; English: Young

Yung is a surname in various cultures.

== Origins ==
Yung may be a spelling of a number of Chinese surnames based on their pronunciation in different varieties of Chinese, including the below surnames (listed by their spelling in Pinyin, which reflects the Mandarin pronunciation):

- Róng (容), spelled Yung based on its Cantonese pronunciation (Jyutping: Jung4; Cantonese Yale: Yùhng)
- Róng (榮), spelled Yung based on its pronunciations in multiple varieties of Chinese including Hakka
- Wēng (翁), spelled Yung based on its Cantonese pronunciation (Jyutping: Jung1; Cantonese Yale: Yūng)
- Yáng (楊)

Yung is also a variant spelling of the English and Scottish surname Young. These surnames originated from the Middle English word yong.

Yung may also originate from Cyrillic transcription of the German surname Jung (Юнг), which can be found among the descendants of Germans in the former Soviet Union.

== Statistics ==
According to statistics cited by Patrick Hanks, there were 338 people on the island of Great Britain and twelve on the island of Ireland with the surname Yung as of 2011. There had been twelve people with the surname Yung in Great Britain in 1881.

The 2010 United States census found 4,218 people with the surname Yung, making it the 7,849th-most-common name in the country. This represented a decrease from 4,272 (7,208th-most-common) in the 2000 census. In both censuses, about three-quarters of the bearers of the surname identified as Asian, and two-tenths as White.

== People ==
- Yung Wing (容閎; 1828–1912), first Chinese graduate of an American university
- Nikolay Yung (Никола́й Юнг; 1855–1905), Imperial Russian Navy officer
- Yung Fung-shee (容鳳書; 1900–1972), Hong Kong philanthropist
- Victor Sen Yung (揚森; 1915–1980), American character actor
- Sanford Yung (容永道; 1927–2013), Hong Kong accountant
- Bill Yung (born 1934), American football coach
- Larry Yung (榮智健; born 1942), Chinese businessman
- Judy Yung (1946–2020), American sociologist
- Richard Yung (born 1947), French politician
- Sergey Yung (Серге́й Юнг; born 1955), Russian race walker
- Barbara Yung (翁美玲; 1959–1985), Hong Kong actress
- Moti Yung (born 1959), cryptographer at Google
- Yung Yim King (born 1959), Hong Kong fencer
- Yvonne Yung (翁虹; born 1968), Beijing-born Hong Kong actress
- Frances Yung (榮明方; born 1972), Chinese businesswoman
- Eunice Yung (容海恩; born 1977), Hong Kong barrister and politician
- Joey Yung (容祖兒; born 1980), Hong Kong singer
- Élodie Yung (born 1981), French actress
- Yung Pi-hock (楊比福), Taiwanese basketball player who represented the Republic of China at the 1956 Olympics
- Terence Yung (容皓嘉), Hong Kong-born American classical pianist
- Yuk L. Yung (翁玉林), professor at the California Institute of Technology

People with a stage name that uses the surname Yung include:

- Mike Yung, stage name of Michael Young (born 1959), American singer
- Su Yung, ring name of Vannarah Riggs (born 1989), American professional wrestler
- Yukio Yung, stage name of Terry Burrows, English musician
