= List of Little League Softball World Series participants =

This article details the list of Little League Softball World Series participants by region. The tournament started in 1974 with four participants and has hosted twelve teams since 2022.

== Participants by year ==
Champion
Runner-up

Year	Central	East		South		West		Host	Asia-Pacific	Canada	Europe-Africa	Latin America
Year	Central	Mid-Atlantic	New England	Southeast	Southwest	Northwest	West	Host	Asia-Pacific	Canada	Europe-Africa	Latin America
1974	Dayton, Ohio	(New York (state)) Dix Hills, New York		Tampa, Florida		(Washington (state)) Kirkland, Washington		First appearance 1987	First appearance 1994	First appearance 1991	First appearance 1993	First appearance 1996
1975	Sturgeon Bay, Wisconsin	(New York (state)) Dix Hills, New York		Tampa, Florida		Medford, Oregon		First appearance 1987	First appearance 1994	First appearance 1991	First appearance 1993	First appearance 1996
1976	Sturgeon Bay, Wisconsin	(New York (state)) Queens, New York		(Georgia (U.S. state)) Columbus, Georgia		Salinas, California		First appearance 1987	First appearance 1994	First appearance 1991	First appearance 1993	First appearance 1996
1977	Mount Pleasant, Michigan	Somerset, Massachusetts		Robertsdale, Alabama		Salinas, California		First appearance 1987	First appearance 1994	First appearance 1991	First appearance 1993	First appearance 1996
1978	Boone, Iowa	Shippensburg, Pennsylvania		Salem, Virginia		Glendale, California		First appearance 1987	First appearance 1994	First appearance 1991	First appearance 1993	First appearance 1996
1979	Bartlesville, Oklahoma	North Providence, Rhode Island		Orlando, Florida		(Washington (state)) Mountlake Terrace, Washington		First appearance 1987	First appearance 1994	First appearance 1991	First appearance 1993	First appearance 1996
1980	Chicago, Illinois	Seymour, Connecticut		King, North Carolina		Glendale, California		First appearance 1987	First appearance 1994	First appearance 1991	First appearance 1993	First appearance 1996
1981	Tallmadge, Ohio	North Providence, Rhode Island		Tampa, Florida		Gresham, Oregon		First appearance 1987	First appearance 1994	First appearance 1991	First appearance 1993	First appearance 1996
1982	Brookfield, Illinois	(New York (state)) Staten Island, New York		Salem, Virginia		Glendale, California		First appearance 1987	First appearance 1994	First appearance 1991	First appearance 1993	First appearance 1996
1983	Tallmadge, Ohio	Minersville, Pennsylvania		Naples, Florida		(Washington (state)) Vancouver, Washington		First appearance 1987	First appearance 1994	First appearance 1991	First appearance 1993	First appearance 1996
1984	Indianapolis, Indiana	Glasgow, Delaware		King, North Carolina		Albuquerque, New Mexico		First appearance 1987	First appearance 1994	First appearance 1991	First appearance 1993	First appearance 1996
1985	Brookfield, Illinois	Glasgow, Delaware		King, North Carolina		Hawthorne, California		First appearance 1987	First appearance 1994	First appearance 1991	First appearance 1993	First appearance 1996
1986	Southport, Indiana	Chambersburg, Pennsylvania		Tampa, Florida		Tucson, Arizona		First appearance 1987	First appearance 1994	First appearance 1991	First appearance 1993	First appearance 1996
1987	Tallmadge, Ohio	East Lyme, Connecticut		Tampa, Florida		Tucson, Arizona		Essexville, Michigan	First appearance 1994	First appearance 1991	First appearance 1993	First appearance 1996
1988	Indianapolis, Indiana	Shippensburg, Pennsylvania		Naples, Florida		Glendale, California		Jenison, Michigan	First appearance 1994	First appearance 1991	First appearance 1993	First appearance 1996
1989	Tallmadge, Ohio	Shippensburg, Pennsylvania		Naples, Florida		(Washington (state)) Marysville, Washington		Did not participate	First appearance 1994	First appearance 1991	First appearance 1993	First appearance 1996
1990	Tallmadge, Ohio	Chambersburg, Pennsylvania		Naples, Florida		Glendale, California		Did not participate	First appearance 1994	First appearance 1991	First appearance 1993	First appearance 1996
1991	Tallmadge, Ohio	Glasgow, Delaware		Naples, Florida		Keizer, Oregon		Did not participate	First appearance 1994	(Canada) Victoria, British Columbia	First appearance 1993	First appearance 1996
1992	Tallmadge, Ohio	Glasgow, Delaware		Waco, Texas		Gresham, Oregon		Did not participate	First appearance 1994	(Canada) Duncan, British Columbia	First appearance 1993	First appearance 1996
1993	Southport, Indiana	(New York (state)) Islip, New York		Waco, Texas		(Washington (state)) Marysville, Washington		Did not participate	First appearance 1994	(Canada) Victoria, British Columbia	Prague, Czech Republic	First appearance 1996
1994	Essexville, Michigan	Glasgow, Delaware		Waco, Texas		Gresham, Oregon		Did not participate	Pampanga, Philippines	(Canada) Duncan, British Columbia	Bohemia, Czech Republic	First appearance 1996
1995	Escanaba, Michigan	Greensburg, Pennsylvania		Waco, Texas		Lancaster, California		Tualatin, Oregon	Pampanga, Philippines	(Canada) Windsor, Ontario	Stuttgart, Germany	First appearance 1996
1996	Boone, Iowa	Pennsville, New Jersey		Clearwater, Florida		Manteca, California		Did not participate	Pampanga, Philippines	(Canada) Surrey, British Columbia	Brzeg, Poland	Mexico City, Mexico
1997	Brookfield, Illinois	Warrington, Pennsylvania		Waco, Texas		La Crescenta, California		Did not participate	Pampanga, Philippines	(Canada) Windsor, Ontario	Stuttgart, Germany	Mexico City, Mexico
1998	West Portsmouth, Ohio	Pennsville, New Jersey		Waco, Texas		Beaverton, Oregon		Did not participate	Bacolod, Philippines	(Canada) Victoria, British Columbia	Brzeg, Poland	Mexico City, Mexico
1999	Appleton, Wisconsin	Warrington, Pennsylvania		Waco, Texas		Stockton, California		Did not participate	Bacolod, Philippines	(Canada) Ancaster, Ontario	Ramstein AFB, Germany	Maunabo, Puerto Rico
2000	Tallmadge, Ohio	(New York (state)) Brewster, New York		Waco, Texas		Tualatin, Oregon		Did not participate	Bacolod, Philippines	(Canada) Calgary, Alberta	Spangdahlem AFB, Germany	Maunabo, Puerto Rico
2001	Wheelersburg, Ohio	Greensburg, Pennsylvania		Waco, Texas		(Washington (state)) Kirkland, Washington		Did not participate	Bacolod, Philippines	(Canada) Windsor, Ontario	The Hague, Netherlands	Maunabo, Puerto Rico
2002	South Bend, Indiana	Warrington, Pennsylvania		(Georgia (U.S. state)) Warner Robins, Georgia	Waco, Texas	Tucson, Arizona		Beaverton, Oregon	Bacolod, Philippines	(Canada) Windsor, Ontario	Utrech, Netherlands	Maunabo, Puerto Rico
2003	Escanaba, Michigan	Upper Darby, Pennsylvania		Naples, Florida	Waco, Texas	Manhattan Beach, California		Beaverton, Oregon	Did not participate	(Canada) Victoria, British Columbia	Tuchkovo, Russia	San Nicolaas, Aruba
2004	Essexville, Michigan	Upper Darby, Pennsylvania		McLean, Virginia	Waco, Texas	Pendleton, Oregon		Beaverton, Oregon	Bacolod, Philippines	(Canada) Victoria, British Columbia	Utrech, Netherlands	Maunabo, Puerto Rico
2005	Louisville, Kentucky	Orange, Connecticut		McLean, Virginia	Waco, Texas	Gilroy, California		Portland, Oregon	Bacolod, Philippines	(Canada) Victoria, British Columbia	Brzeg, Poland	Willemstad, Curaçao
2006	Mattawan, Michigan	(New Jersey) Pequannock, Pennsylvania		Morristown, Tennessee	Elgin, Texas	Gilroy, California		Portland, Oregon	Makati City, Philippines	(Canada) Victoria, British Columbia	Ramstein AFB, Germany	Willemstad, Curaçao
2007	Gladstone, Michigan	Waterford, Connecticut		Morristown, Tennessee	Elgin, Texas	Gilroy, California		Beaverton, Oregon	Makati City, Philippines	(Canada) Windsor, Ontario	Ramstein AFB, Germany	Maunabo, Puerto Rico
2008	Sterling, Illinois	Robbinsville, New Jersey		Simpsonville, South Carolina	Waco, Texas	Grand Terrace, California		Beaverton, Oregon	Bacolod, Philippines	(Canada) Windsor, Ontario	Milan, Italy	Maunabo, Puerto Rico
2009	Croswell, Michigan	Greensburg, Pennsylvania		(Georgia (U.S. state)) Warner Robins, Georgia	Crawford, Texas	Anchorage, Alaska		Beaverton, Oregon	Hagåtña, Guam	(Canada) Windsor, Ontario	Milan, Italy	Willemstad, Curaçao
2010	Poland, Ohio	Robbinsville, New Jersey		(Georgia (U.S. state)) Warner Robins, Georgia	Brenham, Texas	Burbank, California		Tigard, Oregon	Did not participate	(Canada) Victoria, British Columbia	Wroclaw, Poland	Maunabo, Puerto Rico
2011	Sterling, Illinois	(New York (state)) New City, New York		Wilkes County, North Carolina	Waco, Texas	Los Angeles, California		Portland, Oregon	Muntinlupa, Philippines	(Canada) Windsor, Ontario	Milan, Italy	Maunabo, Puerto Rico
2012	Anderson, Indiana	(New York (state)) New Hyde Park, New York		Windermere, Florida	Albuquerque, New Mexico	Kapolei, Hawaii		Beaverton, Oregon	Makati City, Philippines	(Canada) Windsor, Ontario	Utrecht, Netherlands	Mexicali, Mexico
2013	Elyria, Ohio	Robbinsville, New Jersey		McLean, Virginia	Robinson, Texas	Tucson, Arizona		Tualatin, Oregon	Iloilo, Philippines	(Canada) Victoria, British Columbia	Milan, Italy	Maunabo, Puerto Rico
2014	Tallmadge, Ohio	Robbinsville, New Jersey		(Georgia (U.S. state)) Columbus, Georgia	Bossier City, Louisiana	Chico, California		Tualatin, Oregon	Iloilo, Philippines	(Canada) Victoria, British Columbia	Prague, Czech Republic	Maunabo, Puerto Rico
2015	Slater, Iowa	Warwick, Rhode Island		Salisbury, North Carolina	Seguin, Texas	(Washington (state)) Snohomish, Washington		Tigard, Oregon	Makati City, Philippines	(Canada) Victoria, British Columbia	Kampala, Uganda	Maunabo, Puerto Rico
2016	Grandville, Michigan	Robbinsville, New Jersey		Salisbury, North Carolina	Helotes, Texas	St. George, Utah		Portland, Oregon	Makati City, Philippines	(Canada) Victoria, British Columbia	Alkmaar, Netherlands	Coamo, Puerto Rico
2017	Floyds Knobs, Indiana	Bear, Delaware		Salisbury, North Carolina	Waco, Texas	Cedar City, Utah		Beaverton, Oregon	Bacolod, Philippines	(Canada) Victoria, British Columbia	Prague, Czech Republic	Coamo, Puerto Rico
2018	Wheelersburg, Ohio	Tunkhannock, Pennsylvania		Gray, Tennessee	River Ridge, Louisiana	(Washington (state)) Kirkland, Washington		Lake Oswego, Oregon	Bacolod, Philippines	(Canada) Victoria, British Columbia	Prague, Czech Republic	Monterrey, Mexico
2019	Polk City, Iowa	South Williamsport, Pennsylvania		Salisbury, North Carolina	River Ridge, Louisiana	Honolulu, Hawaii		Portland, Oregon	Bacolod, Philippines	(Canada) Victoria, British Columbia	Milan, Italy	Mexico City, Mexico
2020	Cancelled due to COVID-19 crisis											
2021	Columbia, Missouri; Zionsville, Indiana	(New York (state)) Orangeburg, New York; Robbinsville, New Jersey		Midlothian, Virginia; Salisbury, North Carolina	Muskogee, Oklahoma; Robinson, Texas	Las Vegas, Nevada; Cave Creek, Arizona		Did not participate due to COVID-19 crisis				
2022	Columbia, Missouri	Delmar, Maryland	Milford, Connecticut	Chesterfield, Virginia	Hewitt, Texas	(Washington (state)) Issaquah, Washington	La Verne, California	Winterville, North Carolina	Bacolod, Philippines	(Canada) St. Albert, Alberta	Bologna, Italy	Guayama, Puerto Rico
2023	Austintown, Ohio	(New York (state)) Massapequa, New York	Milford, Connecticut	Winterville, North Carolina	Hewitt, Texas	Bend, Oregon	San Jose, California	Salisbury, North Carolina	Bacolod, Philippines	(Canada) St. Albert, Alberta	Milan, Italy	Guayama, Puerto Rico
2024	Austintown, Ohio	Greensburg, Pennsylvania	Cranston, Rhode Island	Salisbury, North Carolina	Sterlington, Louisiana	Eagle, Idaho	Willcox, Arizona	Winterville, North Carolina	Bacolod, Philippines	(Canada) Montreal, Quebec	Bologna, Italy	Monterrey, Mexico
2025	Floyds Knobs, Indiana	Johnstown, Pennsylvania	Guilford, Connecticut	Lake Mary, Florida	Tulsa, Oklahoma	(Washington (state)) Mill Creek, Washington	Los Angeles, California	Winterville, North Carolina	Iwate, Japan	(Canada) Repentigny, Quebec	Prague, Czech Republic	São Paulo, Brazil
2026	Owensboro, Kentucky	Toms River, New Jersey	Bristol, Connecticut	Lake Mary, Florida	Helotes, Texas	(Washington (state)) Snohomish, Washington	Live Oak, California	Clayton, North Carolina	Sangō, Japan	(Canada) Repentigny, Quebec	Bologna, Italy	Guayama, Puerto Rico
Year	Central	Mid-Atlantic	New England	Southeast	Southwest	Northwest	West	Host	Asia-Pacific	Canada	Europe-Africa	Latin America

== Participation totals by country/state ==
Rank	State/Province/Country	Total Appearances	Appearances by Region
1	Oregon	28	Host (19) / West (8) / Northwest (1)
2	Texas	27	Southwest (18) / South (9)
3	Philippines	26	Far East/Asia-Pacific (26)
4	California	24	West (24)
5	Pennsylvania	19	East (17) / Mid-Atlantic (2)
6	British Columbia	18	Canada (18)
7	Ohio	17	Central (17)
7	Puerto Rico	17	Latin America (17)
9	Florida	16	South (12) / Southeast (4)
9	North Carolina	16	Southeast (8) / Host (5) / South (3)
11	Michigan	11	Central (9) / Host (2)
11	(Washington (state)) Washington	11	West (8) / Northwest (3)
13	(New York (state)) New York	10	East (9) / Mid-Atlantic (1)
13	Ontario	10	Canada (10)
15	Indiana	9	Central (9)
15	Italy	9	Europe-Africa (9)
15	New Jersey	9	East (8) / Mid-Atlantic (1)
18	Connecticut	8	East (4) / New England (4)
19	Mexico	7	Latin America (7)
19	Virginia	7	Southeast (5) / South (2)
21	Arizona	6	West (6)
21	Czech Republic	6	Europe-Africa (6)
21	Delaware	6	East (6)
21	Germany	6	Europe-Africa (6)
21	Illinois	6	Central (6)
26	(Georgia (U.S. state)) Georgia	5	Southeast (4) / South (1)
26	Netherlands	5	Europe-Africa (5)
28	Iowa	4	Central (4)
28	Louisiana	4	Southwest (4)
28	Poland	4	Europe-Africa (4)
28	Rhode Island	4	East (3) / New England (1)
32	Alberta	3	Canada (3)
32	Curaçao	3	Latin America (3)
32	Oklahoma	3	Southwest (2) / Central (1)
32	Quebec	3	Canada (3)
32	Tennessee	3	Southeast (3)
32	Wisconsin	3	Central (3)
38	Hawaii	2	West (2)
38	Japan	2	Asia-Pacific (2)
38	Kentucky	2	Central (2)
38	Missouri	2	Central (2)
38	New Mexico	2	Southwest (1) / West (1)
38	Utah	2	West (2)
44	Alabama	1	South (1)
44	Alaska	1	West (1)
44	Aruba	1	Latin America (1)
44	Brazil	1	Latin America (1)
44	Guam	1	Asia-Pacific (1)
44	Idaho	1	Northwest (1)
44	Maryland	1	Mid-Atlantic (1)
44	Massachusetts	1	New England (1)
44	Nevada	1	West (1)
44	Russia	1	Europe-Africa (1)
44	South Carolina	1	Southeast(1)
44	Uganda	1	Europe-Africa (1)
