= Weng (surname) =

- Weng surname in regular script
- Pronunciation: Wēng (Pinyin); Ang (Pe̍h-ōe-jī)
- Language: Chinese

Origin
- Language: Chinese
- Meaning: individual word can have many meanings, often used in phrase '老翁' meaning 'old man'

Other names
- Variant form: Weng

Weng (Chinese: 翁; pinyin: Wēng) is a Chinese surname. It is also spelled Yung based on its Cantonese pronunciation, Eng based on its Teochew pronunciation, or Ong based on its Hokkien pronunciation.

Weng is also a surname coming from place names in Germany and Austria

== Notable people ==
Weng

- Weng Chang-liang (born 1965), retired Taiwanese politician
- Weng Cheng-yi, Taiwanese mechanical engineer
- Weng Fanggang (1733–1818), Chinese calligrapher, literary critic, philosopher, and poet
- Weng Hongyang (born 1999), Chinese male badminton player
- Weng Li-you (born 1975), Taiwanese singer
- Weng Tonghe (1830–1904), Chinese Confucian scholar
- Weng Wenhao (1889–1971), Chinese geologist and politician
- Weng Weng (1957–1992), Filipino actor and martial artist
- William Weng (1907–1993), American journalist and crossword puzzle constructor
- Weng Zuliang (born 1963), Chinese politician
- Weng De Lin (born 1995), Singaporean

Ong

- Alex Ong Boon Hau (翁文豪; born 1951), Malaysian painter
- Ong Chit Chung (翁执中; 1949–2008), Singaporean politician
- Ong Huay Dee (翁伙俤 Wēng Huŏdì), Singaporean taxi driver and murder victim
- Ong Schan Tchow (翁占秋; 1900–1945), Chinese artist
- Ong Tee Keat (翁诗杰; born 1956), Malaysian politician
- Ong Yoke Lin (翁毓麟; 1917–2010), Malaysian politician
- Ong De Lin (翁德琳; 1995), Singaporean

Ang

- Andrew Ang (翁安得烈, born 1946), former Singaporean supreme court judge
- Muljadi (born Ang Tjin Siang 翁振祥; 1942–2010), Indonesian businessman
- Tahir (born Ang Tjoen Ming 翁俊民; born 1952), Indonesian businessman

Ng

- Vincent Ng Cheng Hye (翁清海; born 1975), Singaporean actor, martial artist and businessman

Ongg

- Judy Ongg (翁倩玉; born 1950), Taiwanese-Japanese singer

Oung

- Andrew Oung (翁大銘; 1950–2015), Taiwanese politician

Ueng

- Ueng Ming-yih (翁明義; born 1952), Taiwanese skier

Yung

- Barbara Yung (翁美玲; 1959–1985), Hong Kong actress
- Philip Yung (翁子光), Hong Kong film director
- Yvonne Yung (翁虹; born 1968), Chinese actress
- Yuk L. Yung (翁玉林), professor at the California Institute of Technology
