= Russian battleship Oryol =

Russian Borodino-class battleship

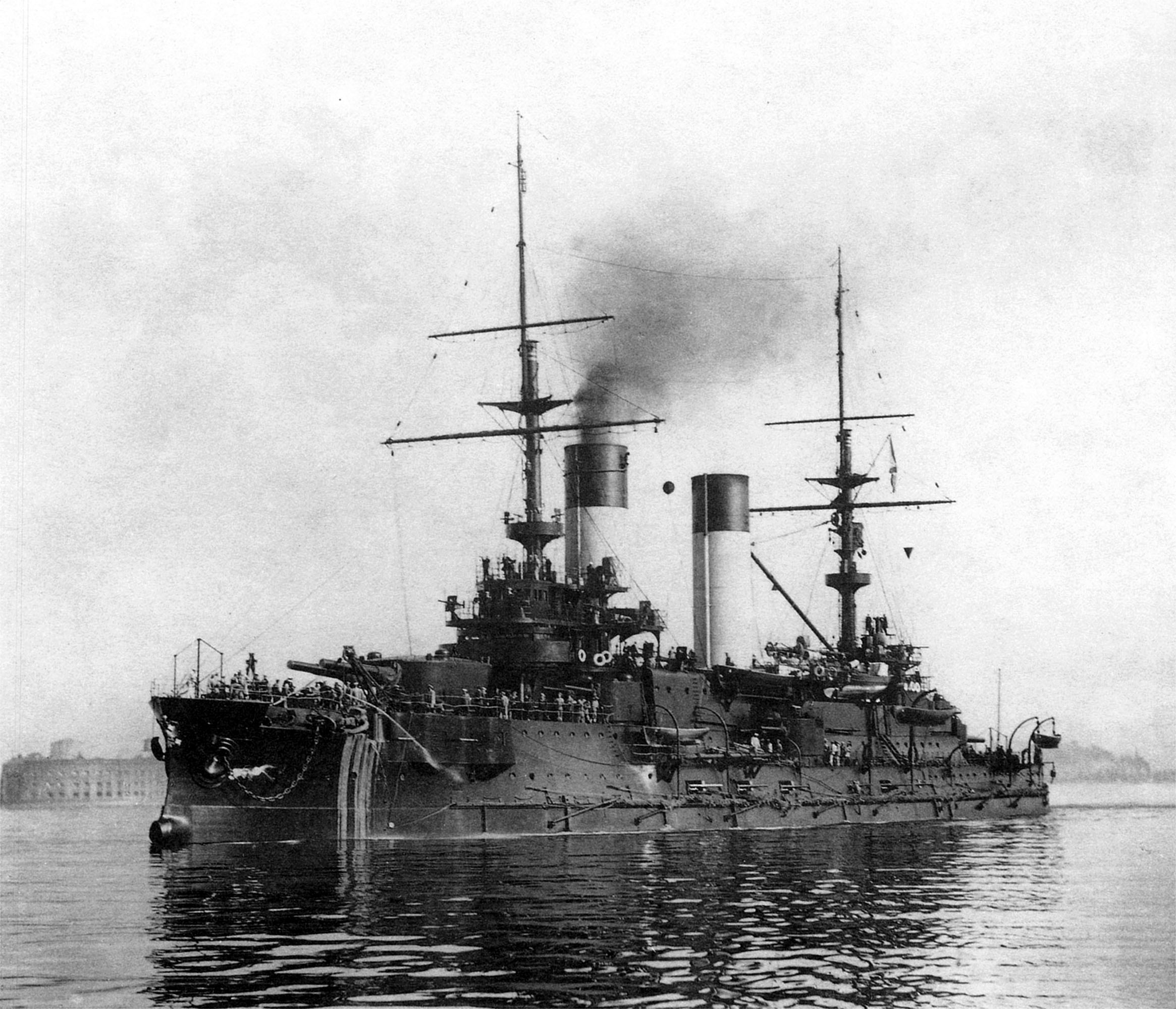
- Oblique view of Oryol preparing to go to sea at Kronstadt, August 1904

History

Russian Empire
- Name: Оryol (Russian: Орёлъ)
- Namesake: Eagle
- Ordered: 7 November 1899 (Note: All dates used in this article are New Style which is 12 days later before 1900 and 13 after 1900.)
- Builder: Galerniy Island Shipyards, Saint Petersburg
- Laid down: 1 June 1900
- Launched: 19 July 1902
- Completed: October 1904
- Stricken: 13 September 1905
- Fate: Captured by the Imperial Japanese Navy, 28 May 1905

Empire of Japan
- Name: Iwami (Japanese: 石見)
- Namesake: Iwami Province
- Acquired: 28 May 1905
- In service: June 1907
- Out of service: April 1922
- Reclassified: As 2nd-class coast defense ship, 1 September 1912; As 1st-class coast defense ship, September 1921
- Stricken: 1 September 1922
- Fate: Sunk as target, 10 July 1924

General characteristics (as built)
- Class & type: Borodino-class pre-dreadnought battleship
- Displacement: 14,151 long tons (14,378 t)
- Length: 397 ft (121 m) (o/a)
- Beam: 76 ft 1 in (23.2 m)
- Draft: 29 ft 2 in (8.9 m)
- Installed power: 20 Belleville boilers; 15,800 ihp (11,782 kW)
- Propulsion: 2 shafts, 2 triple-expansion steam engines
- Speed: 18 knots (33 km/h; 21 mph)
- Range: 2,590 nmi (4,800 km; 2,980 mi) at 10 knots (19 km/h; 12 mph)
- Complement: 28 officers, 826 enlisted men
- Armament: 2 × twin 12 in (305 mm) guns; 6 × twin 6 in (152 mm) guns; 20 × single 75 mm (3 in) guns; 20 × single 47 mm (1.9 in) guns; 4 × single 15 in (381 mm) torpedo tubes
- Armor: Krupp armor; Belt: 5.7–7.64 inches (145–194 mm); Deck: 1–2 inches (25–51 mm); Turrets: 10 inches (254 mm)

Oryol (Russian: Орёлъ, "Eagle"; also Orel, Orël) was a Borodino-class battleship built for the Imperial Russian Navy in the first decade of the 20th century. The ship was completed after the start of the Russo-Japanese War in February 1904 and was assigned to the Second Pacific Squadron sent to the Far East six months later to break the Japanese blockade of Port Arthur. The Japanese captured the port while the squadron was in transit and their destination was changed to Vladivostok. Oryol was badly damaged during the Battle of Tsushima in May 1905 and surrendered to the Japanese, who put her into service under the name of Iwami (Japanese: 石見).

Reconstructed by the Japanese in 1905–1907, Iwami was reclassified by the Imperial Japanese Navy as a coastal defense ship in 1912. She participated in the Battle of Tsingtao at the beginning of World War I and supported the Japanese troops that landed in Siberia in 1918 during the Russian Civil War. Iwami was used as a training ship beginning in September 1921. The ship was disarmed in 1922 to comply with the terms of the Washington Naval Treaty and sunk as a target ship two years later.

== Design and description ==
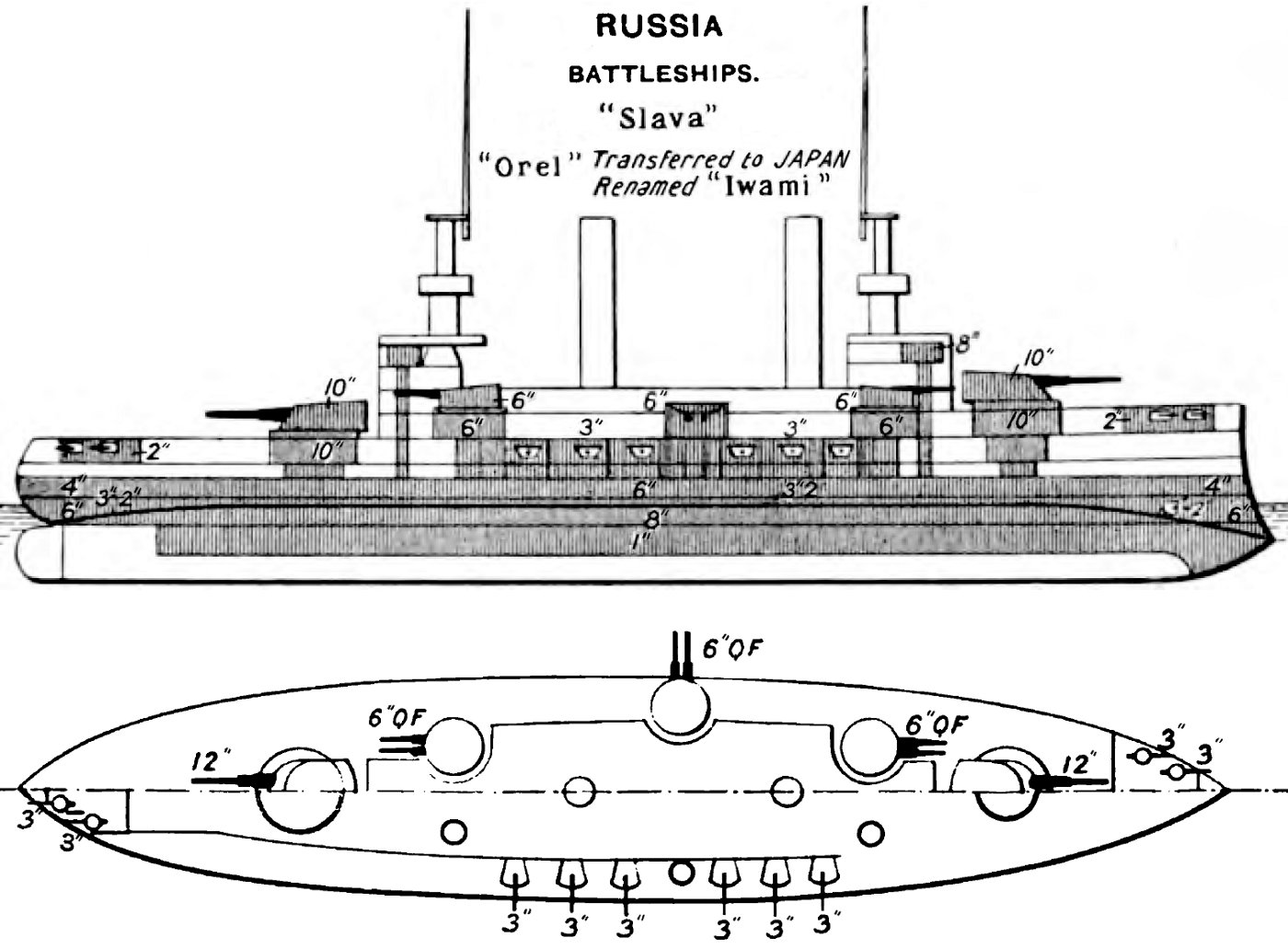
Right elevation and deck plan as depicted in Brassey's Naval Annual 1906

The Borodino-class ships were based on the design of the French-built Tsesarevich, modified to suit Russian equipment and building practices. They were built under the 1898 program "for the needs of the Far East" of concentrating ten battleships in the Pacific. Oryol was 397 feet (121 m) long overall, had a beam of 76 feet 1 inch (23.19 m) and a draft of around 29 feet 2 inches (8.9 m) at deep load. Designed to displace 13,516 long tons (13,733 t), she was more than 600 long tons (610 t) overweight and actually displaced 14,151 long tons (14,378 t). This caused a problem during her sister's sea trials on 6 October 1903 when Imperator Aleksandr III made a high-speed turn that caused her to heel 15° and submerged the embrasures for the 75-millimeter (3 in) guns. The ship's crew consisted of 28 officers and 826 enlisted men.

The ship was powered by a pair of four-cylinder triple-expansion steam engines, each driving one shaft, using steam generated by 20 Belleville boilers. The engines were rated at 15,800 indicated horsepower (11,800 kW) and designed to reach a top speed of 18 knots (33 km/h; 21 mph). Oryol's engines, however, only achieved 14,176 indicated horsepower (10,571 kW) during her official machinery trials on 10 September 1904, although the ship was able to reach her designed speed. She carried enough coal to allow her to steam for 2,590 nautical miles (4,800 km; 2,980 mi) at a speed of 10 knots (19 km/h; 12 mph).

The Borodinos' main battery consisted of four 12-inch (305 mm) guns mounted in two twin-gun turrets, one forward and one aft of the superstructure. The secondary armament consisted of 12 Canet 6-inch (152 mm) quick-firing (QF) guns, mounted in twin-gun turrets. A number of smaller guns were carried for defence against torpedo boats. These included twenty 75-millimeter QF guns and twenty 47-millimeter (1.9 in) Hotchkiss guns. She was also armed with four 15-inch (381 mm) torpedo tubes, one each at the bow and stern above water and two submerged on the broadside. Oryol's waterline armor belt consisted of Krupp armor and was 5.7–7.64 inches (145–194 mm) thick. The armor of her gun turrets had a maximum thickness of 10 in (254 mm) and her deck ranged from 1 to 2 inches (25 to 51 mm) in thickness. She had anti-torpedo bulkheads 1.5 inches (38 mm) thick.

== Construction and career ==
Construction began on Oryol (Eagle) on 7 November 1899 at the Baltic Works in Saint Petersburg. The ship was laid down on 1 June 1900 and launched on 19 July 1902, in the presence of the Emperor. While fitting out in Kronstadt in May 1904 in preparation for the installation of her armor, some temporary sheathing was removed that allowed water to enter and sank the ship five days later. The water was pumped out and the ship refloated without incident. She was completed in October 1904 at the cost of 13,404,000 rubles.

On 15 October 1904, Oryol set sail for Port Arthur from Libau along with the other vessels of the Second Pacific Squadron, under the overall command of Vice Admiral Zinovy Rozhestvensky. Rozhestvensky led his squadron down the Atlantic coast of Africa, rounding the Cape of Good Hope, and reached the island of Nosy Be off the north-west coast of Madagascar on 9 January 1905 where they remained for two months while Rozhestvensky finalized his coaling arrangements. The squadron sailed for Camranh Bay, French Indochina, on 16 March and reached it almost a month later to await the obsolete ships of the 3rd Pacific Squadron, commanded by Rear Admiral Nikolai Nebogatov. The latter ships reached Camranh Bay on 9 May and the combined force sailed for Vladivostok on 14 May. With all of the additional coal and other supplies loaded for the lengthy voyage, the ship was 1,785 long tons (1,814 t) overweight; most of which was stored high in the ship and reduced her stability. The most important aspect of this, however, was that the additional weight completely submerged the ship's main armor belt.

Rozhestvensky decided to take the most direct route to Vladivostok using the Tsushima Strait and was intercepted by the Japanese battlefleet under the command of Admiral Tōgō Heihachirō on 27 May 1905. At the beginning of the battle, Oryol was the last ship in line of the 1st Division, which consisted of all four Borodino-class battleships under Rozhestvensky's direct command. The ship fired the first shots of the Battle of Tsushima when the ship's captain, Nikolay Yung, ordered her to open fire at a Japanese cruiser that was shadowing the Russian formation at a range of 9,000 meters (9,800 yd). Rozhestvensky had not given any pre-battle instructions to the fleet covering this situation, but he ordered Yung to cease fire after 30 rounds had been fired without effect.

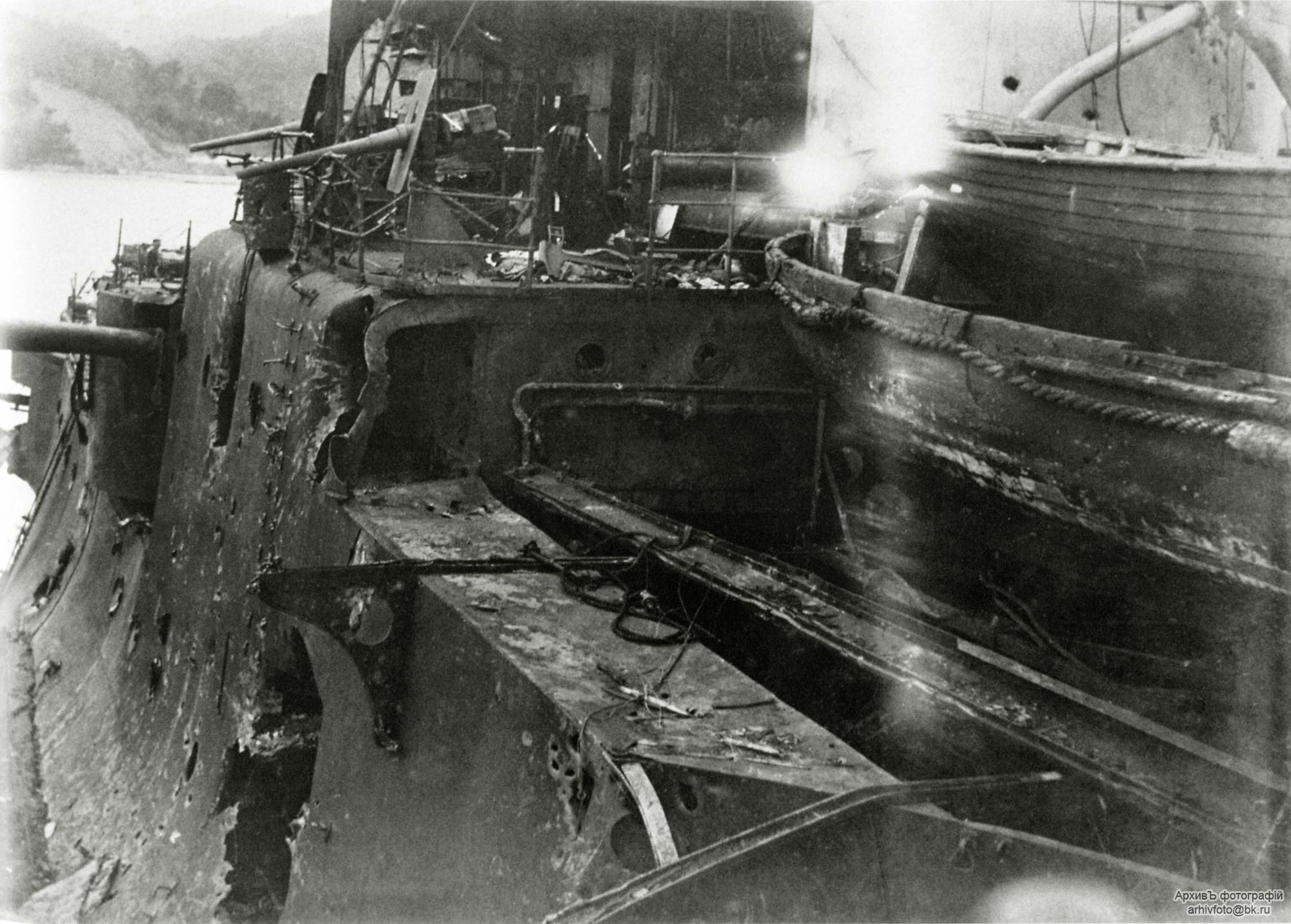
Damage to Oryol after the Battle of Tsushima

Oryol was not heavily engaged during the early part of the battle, but she was set on fire by Japanese shells during this time. About an hour after the battle began, the Chihaya fired two torpedoes at a ship that may have been Oryol, although both torpedoes missed. The Russian formation had become disordered during the early part of the battle and Oryol was second in line after her sister Borodino by 16:00. The Japanese battleships generally concentrated their fire on Borodino during this time and sank her around 19:30. Oryol was hit a number of times as well, but was not seriously damaged.

Oryol took the lead after Borodino was sunk; she was joined by Nebogatov's Second Division after Tōgō ordered the Japanese battleships to disengage in the gathering darkness. Nebogatov assumed command of the remains of the fleet and they continued towards Vladivostok. The ships were discovered by the Japanese early the following morning and attacked by Tōgō's battleships around 10:00. The faster Japanese ships stayed beyond the range at which Nebogatov's ships could effectively reply and he decided to surrender his ships at 10:30 as he could neither return fire nor close the range. The ship was formally stricken from the navy list on 13 September 1905.

During the battle, Oryol was probably hit by five 12-inch, two 10-inch (254 mm), nine 8-inch (203 mm), thirty-nine 6-inch shells, and 21 smaller rounds or fragments. Although the ship had many large holes in the unarmored portions of her side, she was only moderately damaged as all of the four (one 12-inch and three 6-inch) shells that hit her side armor failed to penetrate. The left gun of her forward 12-inch turret had been struck by an 8-inch shell that broke off its muzzle and another 8-inch shell struck the roof of the rear 12-inch turret and forced it down, which limited the maximum elevation of the left gun. Two 6-inch gun turrets had been jammed by hits from 8-inch shells and one of them had been burnt out by an ammunition fire. Another turret had been damaged by a 12-inch shell that struck its supporting tube. Splinters from two 6-inch shells entered the conning tower and wounded Yung badly enough that he later died of his wounds. Casualties totaled 43 crewmen killed and approximately 80 wounded.

== Japanese career as Iwami ==
As Oryol followed the First Division of the Combined Fleet back to Japan after the battle, she developed a list to starboard and her engines began to fail. Escorted (and occasionally towed) by the battleship Asahi and the armored cruiser Asama, she was diverted to Maizuru Naval Arsenal for emergency repairs that lasted until 29 July. While under repair, she was renamed Iwami on 6 June, after the eponymous province, now part of Shimane Prefecture.

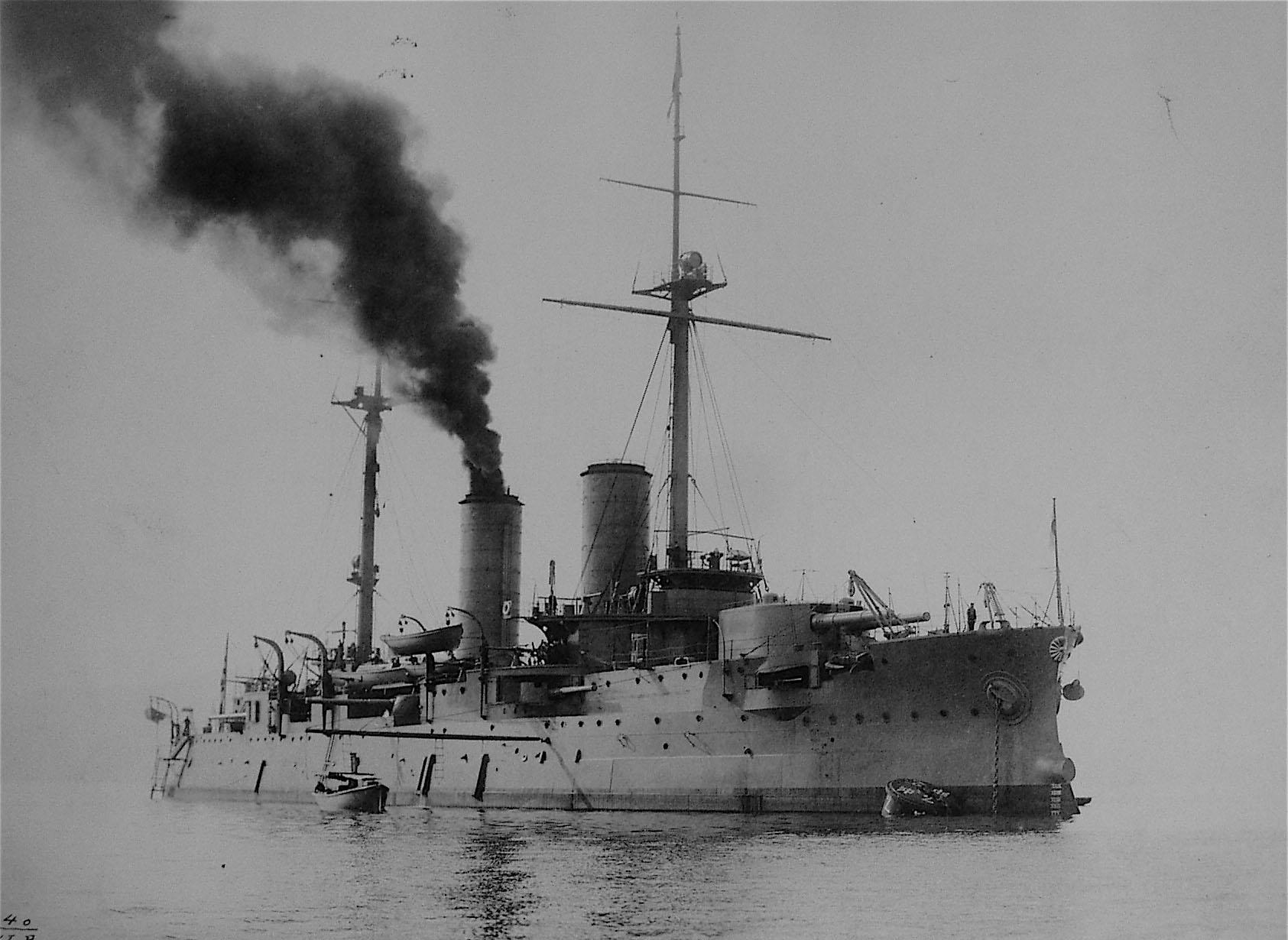
Iwami at anchor at Kure, 2 November 1907

The Japanese substantially rebuilt Iwami at Kure Naval Arsenal and officially recommissioned her into the Imperial Japanese Navy on 2 November 1907. To reduce her top weight, her funnels were shortened, her fighting tops removed, and her superstructure reduced in height. Her twin six-inch gun turrets were removed and replaced by half a dozen eight-inch guns on pedestal mounts that were protected by gun shields. The fore and aft eight-inch guns were repositioned one deck lower, on the same level as the midships guns, and the midships 75-millimeter gun positions were plated over. The 75-millimeter guns were replaced by sixteen Japanese-built QF 12-pounder, 12 cwt (Note: "Cwt" is the abbreviation for hundredweight, 12 cwt referring to the weight of the gun.) guns and two submerged broadside 18-inch torpedo tubes replaced her original torpedo armament. Her boilers were replaced by an unknown number of Japanese-built Miyabara water-tube boilers. These changes reduced her displacement to approximately 13,500 long tons (13,700 t) and her crew now totaled 806 officers and crewmen.

Iwami was assigned to the 1st Fleet on 26 November 1907 although she participated in the 1908 naval maneuvers as part of the 2nd Fleet before rejoining the 1st Fleet the following year. On 1 September 1912, the ship was reclassified as a second-class coastal defense ship. Shortly after the start of World War I in 1914, Iwami was assigned to the 2nd Division of the 2nd Fleet, formed from captured Russian ships. The division blockaded the port and bombarded German defenses during the siege of Tsingtao in August–November 1914. In 1915 Iwami was a guardship at Kure, but she did participate in that year's naval maneuvers and subsequent fleet review.

She was assigned to the 5th Division of the 3rd Fleet on 7 January 1918 as its flagship and landed a company of marines in Vladivostok five days later at the start of the Japanese intervention in Siberia during the Russian Civil War. Iwami returned to Kure on 9 September and was subsequently relieved from her assignment with the 3rd Fleet. The ship was assigned to defend Kamchatka from 24 September 1920 to 30 June 1921 and was based in Vladivostok and Petropavlovsk. She was reclassified as a first-class coast defense ship in September 1921 and was used as a training ship. In accordance with the terms of the Washington Naval Treaty, Japan agreed to scrap Iwami. She was disarmed in April 1922 and used as a depot ship until she was struck on 1 September. Iwami moored to the west of the island of Jōgashima near the mouth of Tokyo Bay and used as a target by aircraft of the Yokosuka Naval Air Group from 5–8 July, finally sinking on 10 July 1924.
