= Chinatown, Salem, Oregon =

Neighborhood in Salem, Oregon, US

Chinatown was an area roughly bounded by Northeast Ferry, Liberty, State and High streets, in Salem, Oregon, United States, in which a high concentration of Chinese residents lived during the late 19th and early 20th centuries. Chinese people came to Salem at first from the California goldfields, becoming numerous in the 1870s, living in "hovels abandoned by white tenants". In the 1890s, like other Chinatowns along the West Coast, the area was considered by non-Asians to be the source of sexually transmitted disease. Around 1905 the city council ordered a block of Chinatown on Liberty Street between Court and State Streets, and some other properties, to be condemned for "health and police concerns". One newspaper said Chinatown's "end" came in 1903. By 1920, there were 72 Chinese residents in the area, down from its peak of 367 in 1890.

== See also ==
- History of Chinese Americans in the Pacific Northwest
