= Rong (surname) =

Chinese surnames

荣
- Romanisation: Róng

Other names
- Alternative spelling: Jung
- Anglicisation: Rong

Rong is the pinyin romanization of several Chinese surnames, which including 戎 Róng, 融 Róng, 荣 Róng, 容 Róng, etc. Among these names, 荣 Róng and 容 Róng are relatively common. during the early Zhou Dynasty, Rong (戎) people the "Rong You" (戎右) get surname Rong (戎).

== Notable people ==
=== 容 Róng ===
With ancestors hailing from Nanping, Zhuhai, Guangdong, many of the Yungs were closely associated with the Chartered Bank (now Standard Chartered).

- Sanford Yung (容永道), pro-Beijing politician and member of the Hong Kong Basic Law Drafting Committee
- Eunice Yung (容海恩) Hong Kong barrister and pro-Beijing politician
- Yung Wing (容閎), the first Chinese student to graduate from a U.S. university
- Terence Yung, concert pianist and international arbitrator
- Yung Fung-shee (容鳳書), Hong Kong philanthropist
- Rong Guotuan (容國圑), ping pong player
- Joey Yung (容祖兒), Hong Kong singer
- John C. Young (容兆珍); Chinese American; key figure in the development of Chinatown, San Francisco

=== 荣 Róng ===
- Rong Yiren (榮毅仁), vice-president of China
- Rong Zhijian (榮智健), Chinese son of Rong Yiren
- Rong Hao, Chinese football defender
