= Phillip Eng =

American transit executive

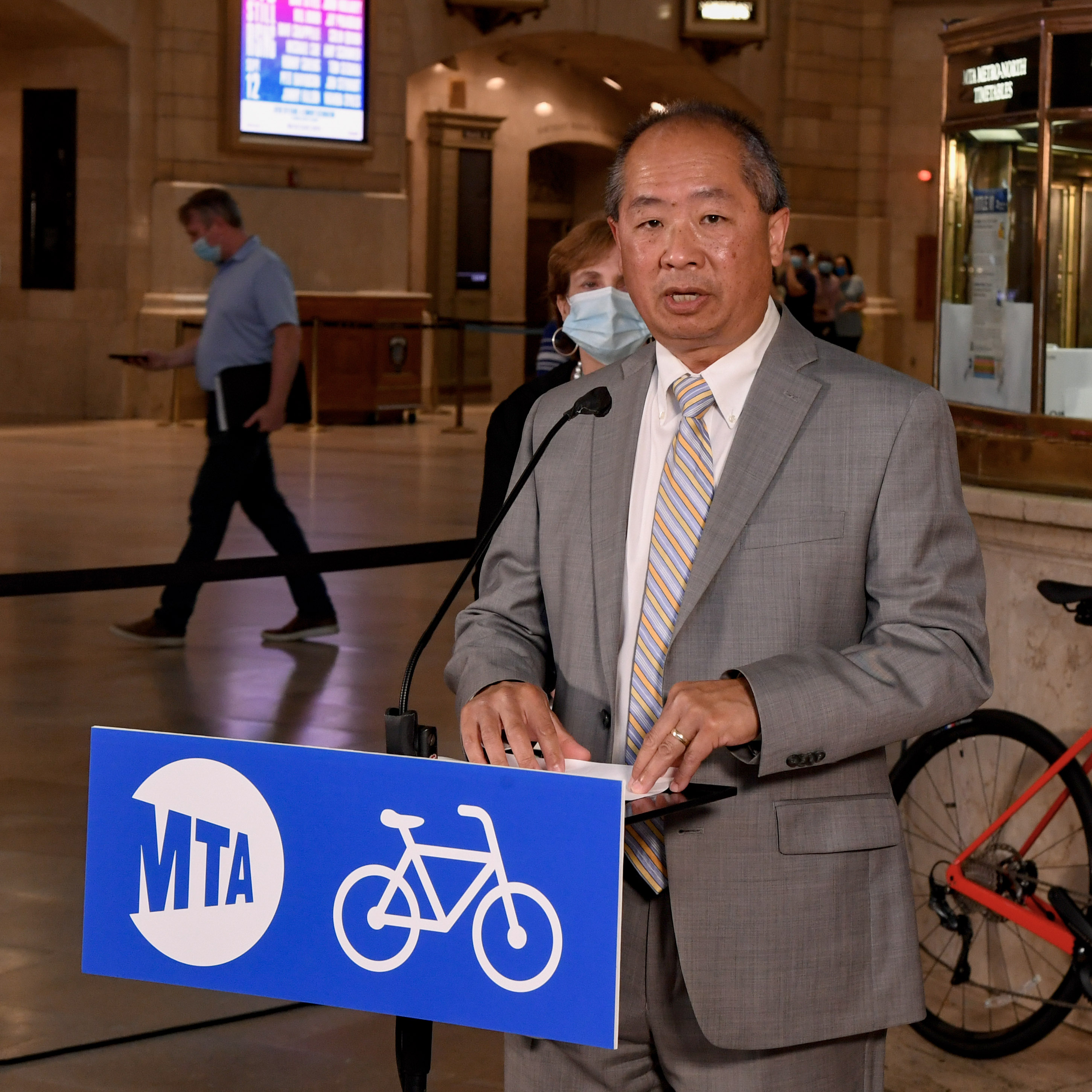
- Eng in 2021
- Born: 1961 or 1962 (age 64–65)
- Education: Cooper Union (BE)
- Years active: 1983–present
- Known for: President of the Long Island Rail Road; General manager of the MBTA; Interim Secretary of the Massachusetts Department of Transportation
- Spouse: Carole Scott (m. 1991)
- Children: 4

Phillip Eng (born 1961 or 1962) is an American civil engineer and transit executive serving as interim secretary of the Massachusetts Department of Transportation and general manager of the Massachusetts Bay Transportation Authority. Before moving to Boston, he served as president of the Long Island Rail Road and as interim president of the New York City Transit Authority.

== Early life and education ==
Eng is the son of Chinese immigrants. He grew up in Williston Park on Long Island, New York, then moved to Mineola. His parents changed the spelling of their family name from Ng to Eng to make it easier for Americans to pronounce.

Eng earned a bachelor's degree in civil engineering from Cooper Union in 1983.

== Career ==
Eng began his career in 1983 as a junior engineer at the New York State Department of Transportation (NYSDOT). He became the department's chief engineer and executive deputy commissioner in 2013. At NYSDOT, he helped execute projects including the construction of the Kosciuszko Bridge and the opening of Rochester station.

In March 2017, Eng was named chief operating officer of the Metropolitan Transportation Authority, then became the New York City Transit Authority's interim president for four months beginning that October. In 2018, he became the 40th president of the Long Island Rail Road (LIRR). In that role, he enacted the initiative "LIRR Forward" to improve the system's reliability, setting on-time records in 2020 and 2021.

After he retired from the LIRR in 2022, he was hired as executive vice president of the LiRo Group, a construction management firm.

Eng was appointed by Massachusetts governor Maura Healey to head the Massachusetts Bay Transportation Authority (MBTA) and started as general manager in April 2023. At the time he assumed leadership, the MBTA faced a maintenance backlog worth an estimated $24.5 billion. In his first year, he vowed to clear the slow zones that plagued many of the MBTA's lines and recover ridership lost to remote work during the COVID-19 pandemic.

The MBTA had been widely criticized for mismanagement before Eng's appointment. The executive director of the agency's advisory board told Axios six months into Eng's term in leadership that "with Phil Eng, it's like the adults are finally in charge." He is the first MBTA general manager since 2015 with previous experience leading a transit agency.

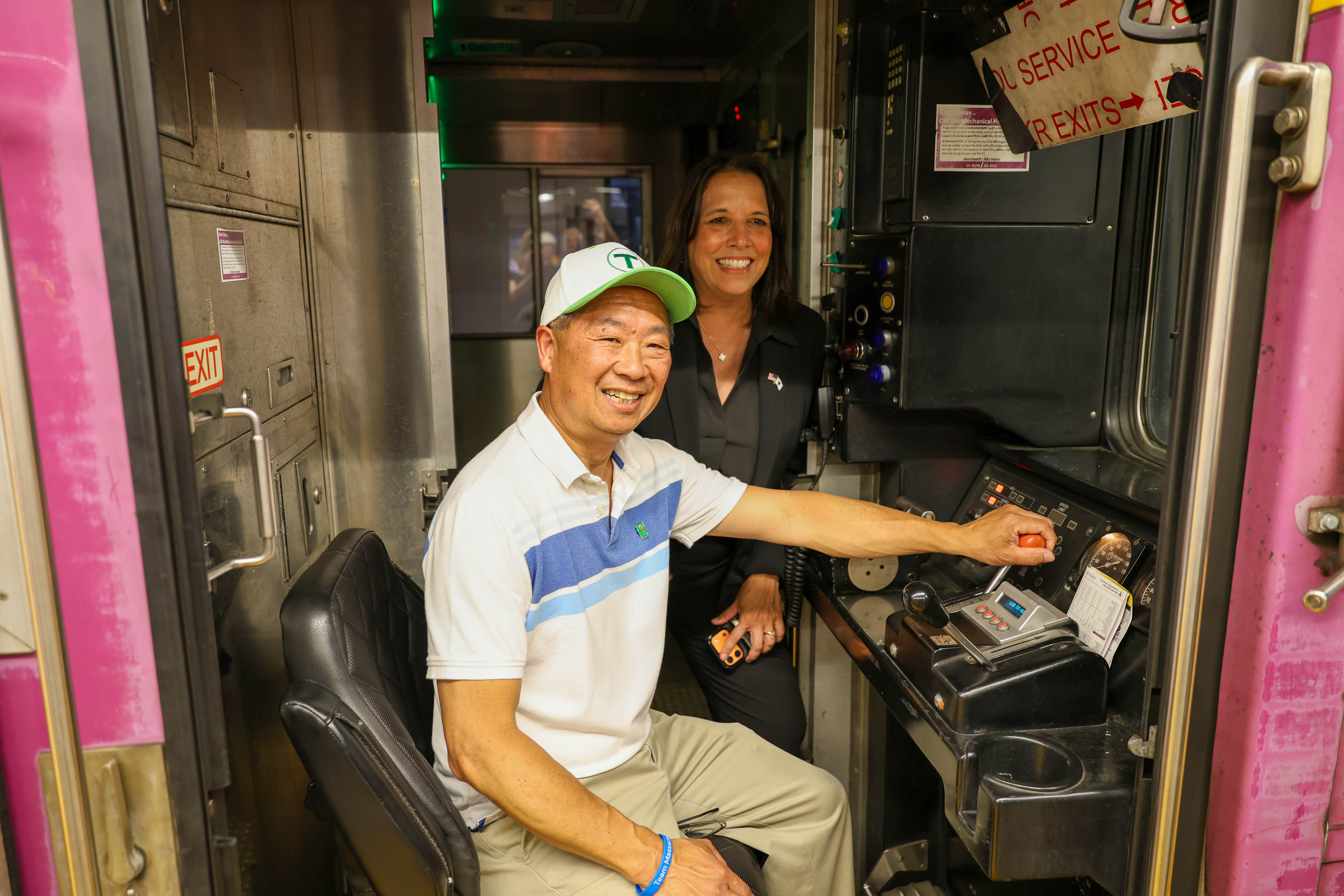
Eng and Kim Driscoll pose in an MBTA Commuter Rail train cab, 2026

In April 2024, Boston.com ran an "unscientific" poll of its readers, finding the plurality of readers giving Eng a grade of 'A' for his job performance at the MBTA. While some were frustrated by the deliberate shutdowns created to clear the slow zones, most readers had praise for Eng's tenure in Boston transit, emphasizing Eng's positive changes in transparency and communication, as well as tangible improvements in their commutes. Eng has also been lauded for his improvements in management and culture at the MBTA. By late 2024 Eng had gained a notably popular following among MBTA riders, spawning numerous positive Internet memes, and even being nicknamed by some as "Train Daddy Eng". In December 2024, The Boston Globe reported that the vast majority of slow zones had been removed, reducing average wait times by as much as 30 percent on the various rail lines.

On October 16, 2025, Eng was named interim secretary of the Massachusetts Department of Transportation following the resignation of previous secretary, Monica Tibbits-Nutt.

== Controversy ==
During a work event in 2024, Eng pulled an employee's hair. Eng apologized for the incident when it became public in 2026. As a result of the incident, the MBTA paid a settlement of approximately $500,000 to the employee.

== Personal life ==
Eng married Carole Scott in 1991 and has four children. He lives in East Boston and takes the Blue Line and Green Line for his commute.

Eng is a beer enthusiast and homebrews his own beer. He is a fan of the New York Mets.
