= Murder of Trista Eng =

1993 kidnapping, rape and murder of a teenage girl in York County, Pennsylvania

Trista Eng
- Trista Eng
- Born: Trista Elizabeth Eng; July 26, 1976; Pennsylvania, U.S.
- Died: July 12, 1993 (aged 16); York County, Pennsylvania, U.S.
- Cause of death: Fatal gunshot wounds
- Resting place: Dillsburg Cemetery
- Education: Trinity High School
- Occupations: High school student Part-time waitress
- Known for: Abduction and murder victim

On July 12, 1993, in York County, Pennsylvania, 16-year-old Trista Elizabeth Eng (born July 26, 1976) was kidnapped, raped and murdered by Hubert Lester Michael Jr. (born August 6, 1956), who was out on bail for an unrelated rape charge. The murder remained unsolved for a month before Michael’s brother found the body and reported it to the police. Michael admitted to the killing and was arrested and charged with murdering Eng. In October 1994, Michael pleaded guilty to first-degree murder and kidnapping in the Court of Common Pleas. He was sentenced to death in March 1995. Michael is on Pennsylvania's death row.

== Murder ==
2025 Mugshot of Hubert Lester Michael Jr.

On July 12, 1993, in York County, Pennsylvania, 16-year-old Trista Elizabeth Eng, who was on her way to work as a part-time waitress at a Hardee's fast food restaurant, was offered a ride by 36-year-old Hubert Lester Michael Jr., and she accepted it. Eng first met Michael at her house, after he responded to an advertisement about a chair for sale at the girl's home in Dillsburg, Pennsylvania.

After Eng entered the car, Michael used several electrical wires, which he stole from Eng's house, to tie up Eng and forcibly took her to the state hunting grounds in Warrington Township, Pennsylvania, where he raped her and placed a bag over her head before firing his gun three times, killing Eng. At the time of the offense, Michael was already charged with rape in an unrelated case in Lancaster County and was out on bail for the rape charge.

According to Michael's testimony, he decided to target Eng after meeting her in connection with a chair sale. He said he felt he had been "unjustly accused" of the offense and felt considerable emotional pressure and anger over the matter. According to his account, these feelings contributed to his decision to abduct Eng and later cause her death, as he sought to direct his anger towards a woman whom he associated with the report made to the authorities.

== Murder charge and trial ==
=== Arrest, prison escape and recapture ===
The murder of Trista Eng was unsolved until August 1993, when Michael was identified as the murderer. Prior to this, Michael was arrested in Utah for violating his bail conditions and sent back to Pennsylvania and detained at the Lancaster County Jail. During a prison visit with his brother, Michael admitted that he murdered a young woman and described the killing in detail, and this prompted Michael's brother and their family members to search the area where Michael said he abandoned the body. This led to the discovery of a woman's severely decomposed corpse, and the victim was later identified as Eng.

As a result, Michael was arrested and charged with the murder of Eng. Three months later, on November 14, 1993, Michael impersonated another prisoner, Darryl Todd Peace, who was serving a weekend jail term for drink driving, and was wrongly released from prison by the authorities. The officers noticed Michael's disappearance several hours later, after they found out Peace was still in prison. A national manhunt was carried out to find and capture Michael, and in December 1993, a $1,000 reward was offered by the Pennsylvania Crime Stoppers for information to locate and arrest Michael.

On March 29, 1994, after spending five months on the run, Michael was arrested in New Orleans, Louisiana, and he was extradited back to Pennsylvania to stand trial.

In July 1994, the defense filed a motion to change the venue of Michael's upcoming trial from York County to another county, due to the pretrial publicity. While the judge did not approve the request, he nevertheless ordered that a jury should be selected from another county and brought to York County to try Michael for Eng's murder.

=== Plea of guilt and sentencing ===
Before Michael was put on trial for the murder of Eng, he was tried in a Lancaster County court for the rape case he was accused of before the killing. He was found guilty as charged in September 1994, and he was sentenced to 10 to 20 years' imprisonment.

On October 11, 1994, in midst of the jury selection stage, Michael pleaded guilty to the murder of Eng at the York County Court of Common Pleas. York County District Attorney Christy Fawcett expressed her intention to seek the death penalty for Michael on the first-degree murder charge. Several days after he entered his guilty plea, however, Michael appealed to withdraw it. The trial court denied the request on October 17, 1994, finding that Michael had knowingly, voluntarily and freely provided a plea of guilt to the murder charge.

On March 1, 1995, a jury was set to decide between the death penalty or life imprisonment for Michael in his upcoming sentencing trial for Eng's murder. However, before the jury could make their decision, Michael waived his right to be sentenced by the jury and elected to be sentenced by the trial judge. On March 20, 1995, Michael was sentenced to death by Judge John Chronister.

=== Appeal ===
On April 17, 1996, Michael's appeal was denied by the Pennsylvania Supreme Court. On June 11, 2012, Michael's petition for a writ of certiorari denied by the United States Supreme Court.

== Execution stays ==
=== 1996 ===
On July 31, 1996, Governor Tom Ridge signed a death warrant for Hubert Michael, scheduling him to be executed on August 27, 1996. On August 22, 1996, a federal judge issued a stay of execution for Michael.

=== 2004 ===
On April 5, 2004, Michael's second death warrant was signed by Governor Ed Rendell, who scheduled his execution for June 1, 2004.

Nearing his date of execution, in May 2004, Michael, who originally asked to be executed and waived his appeal, changed his mind and appealed to reopen his case and re-expedite further appeals against his death sentence. As a result, Michael's execution was stayed while pending his motions to revive his appeals.

=== 2012 ===
On September 13, 2012, Michael's third death warrant was signed by Governor Tom Corbett, who scheduled an execution date of November 8, 2012, for Michael.

On November 8, 2012, hours before the execution could proceed, the 3rd Circuit Court of Appeals issued a stay of execution for Michael and ordered a further review by the lower federal courts. Later that same day, the U.S. Supreme Court upheld the stay order.

=== 2014 ===
On July 24, 2014, Governor Tom Corbett signed a fourth death warrant for Michael, setting his execution date for September 22, 2014.

On September 12, 2014, the governor granted Michael a temporary reprieve from his upcoming execution due to the state's shortage of lethal injection drugs.

=== 2015 ===
In February 2015, Governor Tom Wolf, who succeeded Corbett, imposed a moratorium on the Commonwealth's death penalty, citing that the system was "ineffective, unjust and expensive" and there should be a thorough review on the system and all concerns regarding the death penalty should be addressed. Trista Eng's brother Morgan Eng expressed his disappointment towards the moratorium and stated the family had spent two decades waiting for Michael's execution, and the moratorium was another blow to the family.

On April 22, 2015, York County District Attorney Tom Kearney publicly appealed to the governor to allow the state to execute Michael on June 5, 2015, after the Pennsylvania Department of Corrections signed his fifth death warrant. Kearney cited that Michael's death sentence was appropriate given that the crime was especially heinous and callous, and he described Michael as the "poster child" for the need to retain capital punishment in Pennsylvania.

On June 3, 2015, Governor Wolf issued a stay of execution for Michael, which was in line with his earlier stance to issue reprieves for any pending death warrants. The stay of execution would be in effect until the governor completed his review of the state's report on the capital punishment system. Governor Wolf's decision was sharply criticized by the Eng family, who hoped for Michael to be executed and waited for more than two decades for justice to be served.

In December 2015, the Pennsylvania Supreme Court upheld the decision of Wolf to issue temporary reprieves for Michael and four other condemned prisoners awaiting execution, and rejected a motion filed by Philadelphia District Attorney Seth Williams to challenge the decision.

== Current status ==
A 2017 report showed that Michael was one of 13 York County convicts sentenced to death and awaiting execution in Pennsylvania, and all of them were men and convicted of murder.

Since 2024, Michael has been incarcerated on death row at the State Correctional Institution – Phoenix.

== Aftermath ==
Eng's murder was known as one of the most heinous and notorious murder cases to happen in York County, Pennsylvania.

== See also ==
- Capital punishment in Pennsylvania
- List of death row inmates in the United States § Pennsylvania
