= Hughes Eng =

Hughes Eng, O. Ont, is a community activist in the Chinese community in Toronto, Ontario, Canada.

Eng immigrated to Canada from China during the period of the Chinese Exclusion Act, an experience that lead to his role in getting compensation from the Government of Canada. After graduating from Ryerson Polytechnical Institute (1959) with a degree in Printing Management, he worked at the University of Toronto Press for 28 years and retired in 1987.

He has been Vice-Chair of the Board of the Chinese Cultural Centre of Greater Toronto (1991) and Co-Chair of the National Congress of Chinese Canadians, as well as:

- Vice-Chair of the Canadian Liver Foundation, 1989 to 1995
- Chair of the Confederation of the Toronto Chinese Canadian Organizations, 1994 to 1998
- Member of the Chinese-Canadian Advisory Committee under the Community Historical Recognition Program 2008–present

In 2006 Eng was awarded the Order of Ontario for being the founding director of both the National Congress of Chinese and Chinavision (now Fairchild TV) and for providing decades of exemplary community service in Ontario. He is the father of Ben (Toronto Police Service), Margaret, Rose and Robert, grandfather of David, Heather, Elizabeth, Claire and Neil and great-grandfather to Hudson, Claira, Parker, and Callum, distant relative of Susan Eng.

== See also ==
- Chinese Immigration Act, 1923
- Order of Ontario
