= Richard Eng =

British academic

Richard Eng (born 1964) is an English tutor and entrepreneur based in Hong Kong. He founded Beacon College in Hong Kong, and is considered the first celebrity tutor in Hong Kong.
