= Enge (surname) =

Enge is a surname. Notable people with the surname include:

- Charles Enge (1869–1945), American politician
- Detlef Enge (1952–2025), East German footballer
- Erik Enge (1852–1933), Norwegian politician
- Ivar P. Enge (1922–2013), Norwegian radiologist
- James Enge, pseudonym of James M. Pfundstein, American writer
- Jonas Enge (1908–1981), Norwegian politician
- Ludvig Enge (1878–1953), Norwegian civil servant and politician
- Rolv Enge (1921–2014), Norwegian resistance member and architect
- Tomáš Enge (born 1976), Czech racing driver
