= Nikolay Yung =

Russian naval captain (1855–1905)

Nikolay Viktorovich Yung
- Никола́й Ви́кторович Юнг
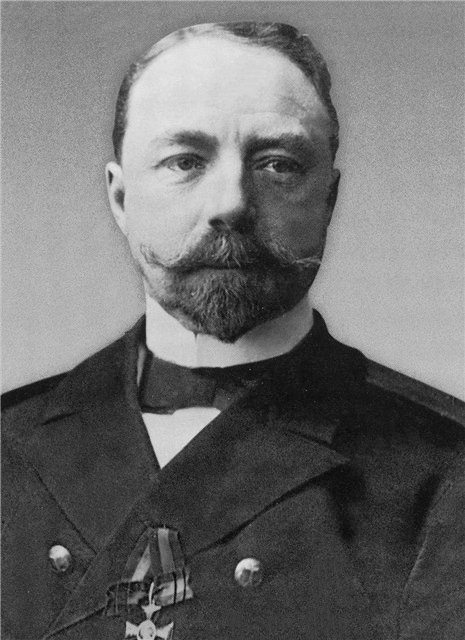
- Nikolay Viktorovich Yung
- Born: November 4, 1855; Tver Governorate, Russian Empire
- Died: May 29, 1905 (aged 49); Tsushima Strait, Sea of Japan
- Military career
- Allegiance: Russian Empire
- Branch: Imperial Russian Navy
- Service years: 1873–1905
- Rank: Captain
- Conflicts: Russo-Turkish War; Russo-Japanese War

Nikolay Viktorovich Yung (Russian: Никола́й Ви́кторович Юнг; 4 November [O.S. 23 October] 1855 – 29 May [O.S. 16 May] 1905) was a career officer in the Imperial Russian Navy, noted for his participation in the Battle of Tsushima in the Russo-Japanese War as captain of the battleship Oryol.

== Biography ==
Yung was from the local nobility of Tver Governorate. In 1872 he entered the Sea Cadet Corp and was accepted into the Imperial Russian Navy in 1873. He graduated from the Naval Academy in 1876 ranked 18th in his class.

During the Russo-Turkish War Yung was assigned to the Danube River flotilla as a warrant officer and commanded a small patrol boat. He was promoted to lieutenant on January 1, 1882, and served on the clipper ship Zhemchug later that year followed by the clipper Rogue from 1882 to 1885.

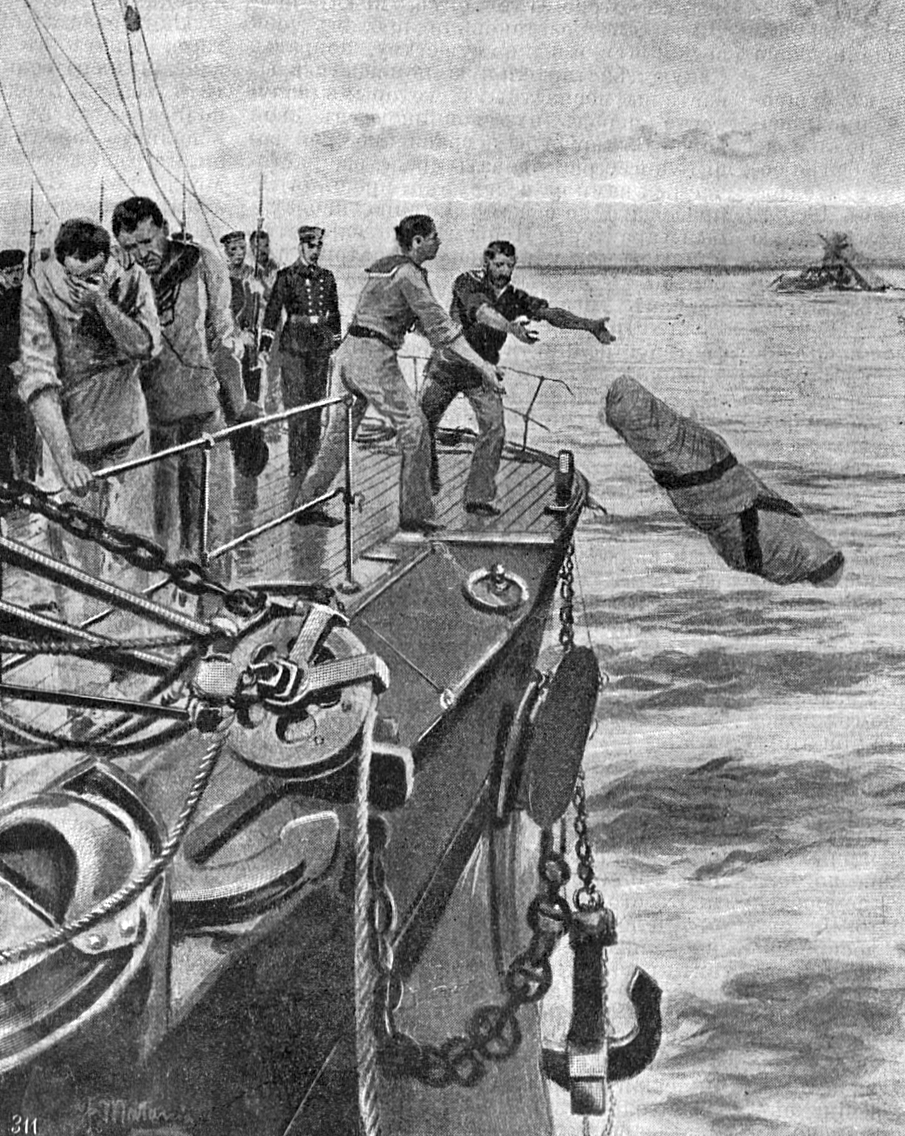
Yung's sea burial

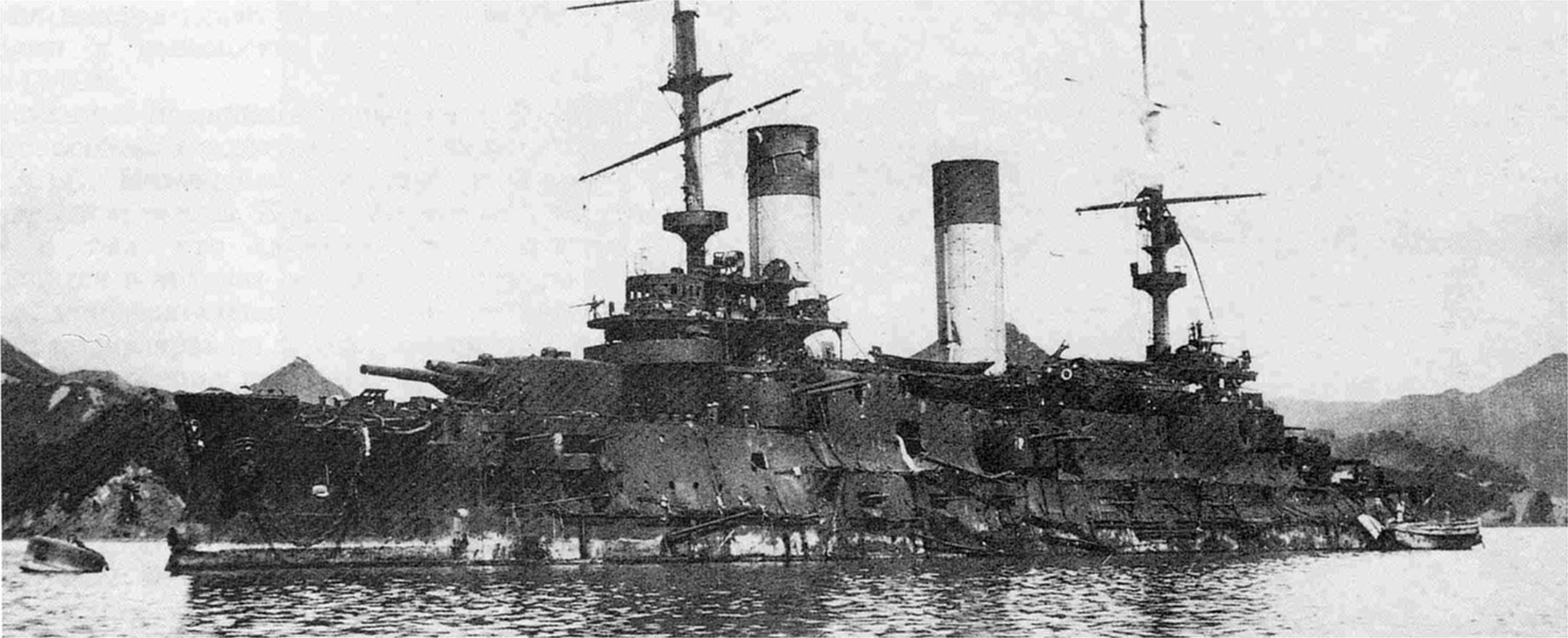
Damaged Oryol after Battle of Tsushima.

Around 1879, Yung became involved with the revolutionary group Narodnaya Volya and was considered one of its founding members at the naval base of Kronstadt. The group initially stood for a mix of democratic and socialist reforms, including a Constituent Assembly (for designing a Constitution); universal suffrage; freedom of speech, press, and assembly; a volunteer military; land reform; and national self-determination. However, it soon mutated into a terrorist organization and was responsible for the assassination of Tsar Alexander II in 1881.

Yung escaped arrest at the time as he was on the Rogue circumnavigating the globe and only returned to Russia in 1886. He was taken into custody on his return, but was soon released by a military tribunal after he disavowed connections to the organization.

Yung was promoted to lieutenant commander on August 30, 1893. He briefly serviced as acting captain of the battleship Poltava in 1894, and in 1897 was captain of the cruiser Vestnik. From 1898,

Yung served on the committee for testing of new warships and on the examination board for testing midshipmen for the Sea Cadet Corps.

From September 20, 1902 through April 19, 1904, Yung was captain of the cruiser General-Admiral. After the start of the Russo-Japanese War, he was reassigned to command the battleship Oryol, as part of the Second Pacific Squadron, which sailed from the Baltic Sea to relieve the Russian Pacific Fleet trapped at Port Arthur by the Imperial Japanese Navy.

The squadron engaged Japanese Admiral Tōgō Heihachirō’s Combined Fleet at the Battle of Tsushima on May 14-15, 1905. (Note: On Julian calendar then use in Russia.) During the battle, Oryol took a tremendous beating from the Japanese ships, and Commander Yung was seriously wounded and unconscious at the surrender of the Russian fleet by Admiral Nikolai Nebogatov. He died of his wounds the following night at 20:05. In accordance with the wishes of his crew, the Japanese conducted a burial at sea at 35°56′N 135°10′E next morning with half-mast flown on battleships Oryol, IJN Asahi and cruiser IJN Asama at 07:30 on 30 May 1905 (Gregorian date) with Oryol POWs present.

== Honors ==
- Order of St. Stanislaus 3rd degree 1879 (Russian Empire).
- Royal Order of Kapiolani, Officer Cross, 1884 (Kingdom of Hawaii).
- Order of St. Anne 3rd degree 1892 (Russian Empire).
- Order of St. Stanislaus 2nd degree 1894 (Russian Empire).
- Legion of Honour, Chevalier, 1894 (French Third Republic).
- Order of St. Anne 2nd degree 1899 (Russian Empire).
