= Yung Fung-shee =

Hong Kong philanthropist

容鳳書 Yung Fung-shee
- Born: 1900; British Hong Kong
- Died: 27 August 1972 (aged 72); British Hong Kong
- Occupation: Philanthropist

Chinese name
- Traditional Chinese: 容鳳書
- Simplified Chinese: 容凤书
Transcriptions
Standard Mandarin
- Hanyu Pinyin: Róng Fèngshū
- Bopomofo: ㄖㄨㄥˊ ㄈㄥˋ ㄕㄨ
Yue: Cantonese
- Jyutping: jung^{4} fung^{6} syu^{1}

Yung Fung-shee (Chinese: 容鳳書; 1900 – 27 August 1972) was a Hong Kong philanthropist. The Yungs were closely associated with the Chartered Bank (now Standard Chartered Bank). Fung-shee's grandfather, Yung Leung was the first comprador of the Chartered Bank, while several of his descendants, including one of his sons Yung Yik-ting, had successively held key positions such as compradors and sub-compradors in the Bank. Fung-shee, who kept a low-profile, had earned large sums of profits investment of securities. Her will in 1969 provided that assets valued at HK$3 million would go to the Hong Kong Government for the construction of free healthcare centres and clinics for the needy. By the time of her death in August 1972, the value of bequest had grown to HK$16 million, and HK$51 million by late 1978, funding Yung Fung Shee Memorial Centre in Kwun Tong, Kowloon and Madam Yung Fung Shee Health Centre in Yuen Long, New Territories, which costed HK$70 million and HK$32 million respectively.

== Life ==
=== During her lifetime ===
Yung Fung-shee was born in Hong Kong in 1900. With ancestors hailing from Nanping, Zhuhai, Guangdong, the Yungs were closely associated with the Chartered Bank (now Standard Chartered Bank). Fung-shee's grandfather, Yung Leung (容良; 1833 – 1904) was the first comprador of the Chartered Bank. Yung Yik-ting (容翼庭, also named Yung Hin-pong [容顯邦]; 1864 − 1913), one of Leung's sons, who had served at the Tung Wah Hospital and the Po Leung Kuk as director, succeeded Leung as comprador, and in 1906 he was appointed by the Government as an unofficial Justice of the Peace. Among the offspring of Yik-ting, his eldest son Yung Tsze-ming (容子明, also named Yung Hin-chung [容顯中]; 1883 – 1940) worked as the comprador of Bank; his second son Yung Hin-yan pursued his studies in civil engineering in the United States; his fourth son, Yung Hin-chiu (容顯超), had served as sub-comprador of the Bank; Yung Hin-fun (容顯勳), his fifth son died of tuberculosis, while his sixth son Yung Hin-chew (容顯朝) had also worked in the Chartered Bank as comprador. Sanford Yung, the son of Hin-fun, founded the Sanford Yung & Co (predecessor of PricewaterhouseCoopers) and was the first Chinese member of the Institute of Chartered Accountants of Scotland.

Little is known regarding Fung-shee's birth, childhood, education, career and family background. However, in the book Women's Competition (女爭) written in 2014, Hong Kong historians Victor Zheng (鄭宏泰) and Wong Siu-lun (黃紹倫) conjectured that she was likely to be one of the daughters of Yung Kwok-tai (容國大, also named Yung Yik-sun [容翼宸]; 1861 – 1921), Yik-ting's elder brother. This was because Kwok-tai fathered five sons and two daughters, while Fung-shee made a will in her later years to pass on part of her assets to a brother known as "Yung Hin-kwan", who was believed to be one of Kwok-tai's sons (whose name is rendered as "容顯君" in Chinese). It is also speculated that she might be the daughter of Yung Pui-yiu (容配堯, also named Yung Kwok-tuen [容國端]; 1873 – 1917), Yik-ting's twelfth younger brother, because in the Yungs' genealogy book, it shows that Pui-yiu had two sons and seven daughters, while three of his daughters' marital status was not displayed; in spite of that, it can also mean that they were not married by the time of revising the genealogy book. In an article about the life of Fung-shee published by the South China Morning Post in 1972, it stated that she had five brothers, increasing the probability of her being Kwok-tai's daughter.

According to known sources, Yung was the third child in her family, hence she was addressed as "Sam Ka-tse" (三家姐, literally "third elder sister") and "Third Lady of the Yungs" (容三小姐). Born into a wealthy family, Yung resided at Robinson Road, Mid-Levels, Hong Kong Island during her lifetime, while back before World War II, she had been actively involved in the investment market, earning large sums of profits from the investment of securities over the years. Nevertheless, she kept a low profile and lived a frugal life, dressing plainly and had never purchased any new garments in the last ten years of her life. On top of that, she travelled mainly by bus or on foot; she had not bought any car, nor hired a chauffeur. In her free time, she played mahjong with a few of her friends. Yung had never married. She died at 21:00, 27 August 1972 at the Hong Kong Sanatorium & Hospital, Happy Valley, at the age of 72; Her remains were shifted to the Hong Kong Funeral Home for her funeral and cremated at the Cape Collinson Crematorium three days later.

=== After her death ===
On 13 October 1969, Yung entrusted the Chartered Bank of Hongkong Trustees Limited to make a will, bestowing HK$3 million worth of assets to the Hong Kong Government, for the construction of free healthcare centres for the needy. The bequest mainly came from her profits from the investment of securities from various public companies, which by the time of her death in 1972 had grown to HK$16 million. Following her death, the Chartered Bank of Hongkong Trustees Limited, confirmed by the Supreme Court in December 1972 as the sole undertaker, discussed with the Medical and Health Department of Hong Kong on how to best use the bequest to fulfil her last wishes.

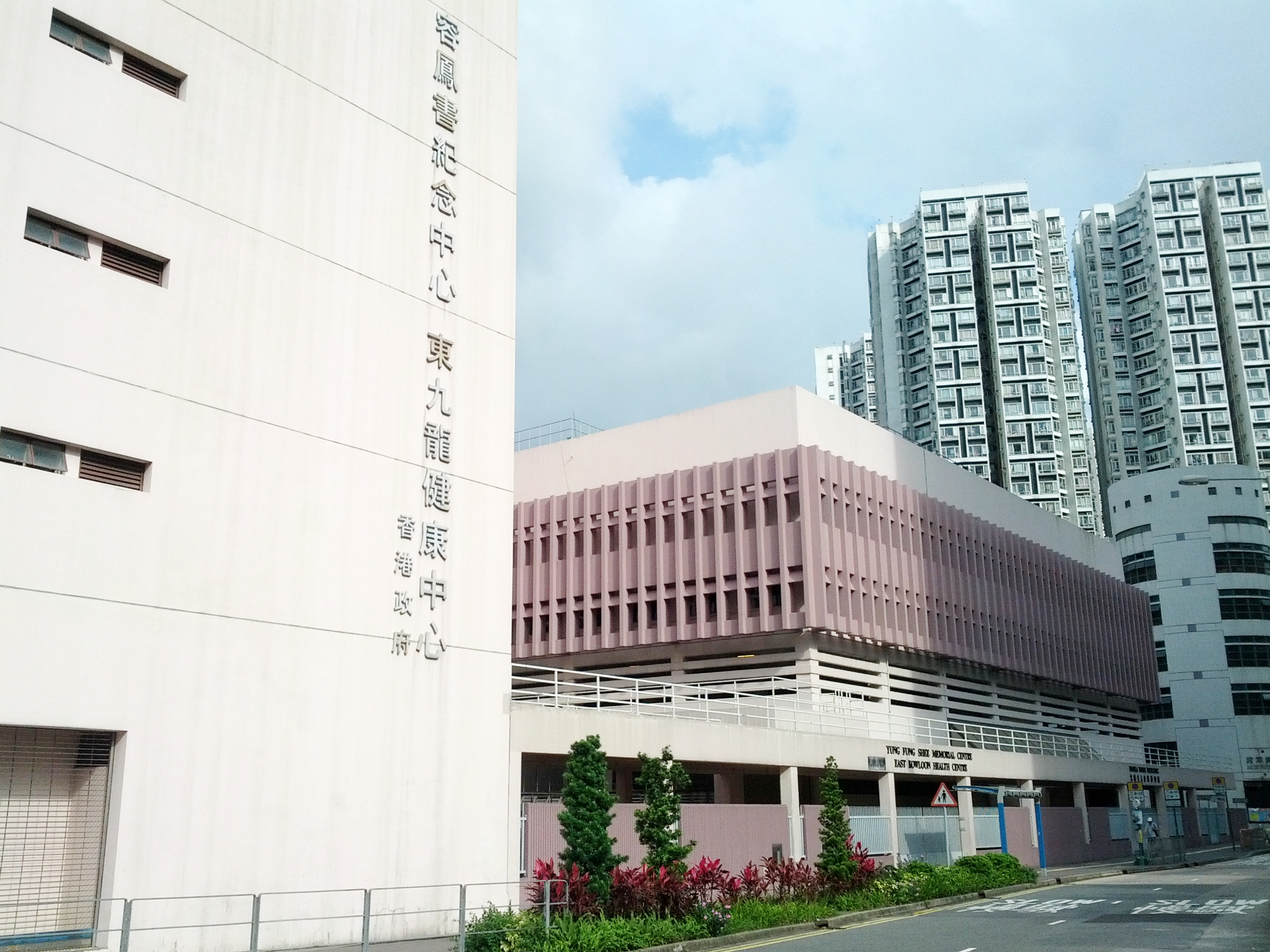
Yung Fung Shee Memorial Centre (pictured, in May 2014), located in Kwun Tong, Kowloon, opened its doors in 1984

After several years of discussions, the Department decided to build a healthcare centre at Cha Kwo Ling Road, Kwun Tong, Kowloon. The project commenced in 1979 and was completed in 1984. The centre was officially opened by Governor Sir Edward Youde on 23 November 1984. Up to HK$70 million was spent on construction and the cost was fully defrayed from Yung's bequest. As indicated in Yung's will, the centre was named the Yung Fung Shee Memorial Centre (容鳳書紀念中心). The centre is made up of a seven-storey and a two-storey building, with a floor area of 10,200 m^{2}. Serving mainly residents living in East Kowloon, the centre consists of a public health laboratory, a family health service department, a chest and social hygiene clinic, a diagnostic radiology department, a physical and occupational therapy department, as well as a district health education centre.

After the opening of the Memorial Centre, the balance in Yung's bequest became a trust fund for the construction of another healthcare centre. HK$32.5 million was withdrawn to aid the construction of Madam Yung Fung Shee Health Centre (容鳳書健康中心) located at Sai Ching Street, Yuen Long, New Territories. The opening of the centre was officiated by Lau Wong-fat, a legislative council member and the chairman of Heung Yee Kuk, on 26 March 1991. The centre, which serves primarily Yuen Long residents, is four stories high and provides services such as general outpatient clinic, family health, community nursing, dental and eye care.

== Places named after her ==
- Yung Fung Shee Memorial Centre (容鳳書紀念中心), located at Cha Kwo Ling Road, Kwun Tong, Kowloon, opened in 1984.
- Madam Yung Fung Shee Health Centre (容鳳書健康中心), located at Sai Ching Street, Yuen Long, New Territories, opened in 1991.

== See also ==
- United Christian Hospital
