= History of Chinese Americans in the Pacific Northwest =

Chinese Americans in the Pacific Northwest have been around since as early as the 1850s. Chinese Americans arrived in the Greater Seattle area in as early as 1851. Oregon had also seen an influx of Chinese Immigrants as early as 1851, because of mining opportunities. Idaho saw an influx of Chinese Immigrants in the late-19th century, and by 1870 saw a population of around 4,000 Chinese immigrants. The influx of Chinese immigrants in the Pacific Northwest and the rest of the Western United States led to retaliation by whites, leading to anti-Chinese sentiment in the United States. These sentiment then led to the Chinese Exclusion Act of 1882, which expelled many Chinese Americans in the Pacific Northwest. Chinese exclusion is also driven by the failure of restriction. The United States had passed the Chinese Exclusion Act of 1882 to slow immigration, and mend Sinophobia in the west. However, the enforcement of the exclusion act was lackluster. The United States Department of Treasury had found itself with no money to enforce this law. Thus, nullifying the purpose of the exclusion act. Additionally, under the Chinese Exclusion Act of 1882, Chinese people could migrate to the United States if they were return immigrants. Consequently, Chinese immigrants began claiming that they were return immigrants so that they could work in the United States. This also made the Chinese Exclusion Act 1882 useless. This led the United States government to pass the Scott Act of 1888. This excluded all Chinese immigration because it was cheaper, and it appeased the racial tensions in the west.

== Oregon ==
=== History ===
In the mid-1850s when finding gold in California became harder, many Chinese immigrants moved to new territories. The Chinese first migrated to southern Oregon but then moved to eastern Oregon after hostilities forced them to move. Between 1855 and 1865, the majority of Chinese immigrants in Oregon were miners with some being merchants. 1865 to 1885 saw an influx of Chinese immigrants arrive to Oregon. As their population increased, interest in different economic opportunities also increased, such as jobs in commercial agriculture, salmon canneries, railroad construction, domestic service, and service work. By 1870, the population of Chinese in Oregon was 3,330. This would continue to grow and would be at 10,370 by the 1900s.

=== Anti-Chinese sentiments ===
Anti-Chinese sentiments in Oregon developed as early as 1857, where EuroAmericans adopted similar discriminatory laws against Chinese miners to that of California and Nevada. Chinese miners also had to pay a $50 yearly tax to the Government of Oregon and although they paid taxes, Chinese were prohibited from voting. Article XV, Section 8 of the Oregon Constitution stated that "No Chinaman, not a resident of the state at the adoption of this constitution, shall ever hold any real estate or mining claim, or work any mining claim therein." In 1882, the United States government passed the Chinese Exclusion Act of 1882. Together with the Exclusion Act, Oregon also banned interracial marriage. Chinese were also banned from attending in public schools, entering professions, and were discriminated against in housing.

Additionally, Anti-Chinese sentiments were encouraged by unions in the pacific northwest. The Knights of Labor encouraged racial hegemony by enforcing a white only workforce. Essentially, Chinese laborers were often subject of scrutiny because they were hired as union breakers. Whenever a company felt that the union workers were making too much, they simply opted to hire Chinese workers for cheaper labor. This led to Sinophobic sentiments in the Pacific Northwest that was notoriously led by the Knights of Labor.

During the exclusion era, most of the Chinese in Oregon lived in Portland, where they lived in their own communities, most in the west bank of the Willamette River. Many of the Chinese were not allowed to live beyond their own communities except as live-in domestics. These Anti-Chinese discriminatory laws highly affected the Chinese population in Oregon, decreasing its numbers to 2,102 by 1950.

== Washington ==
=== History ===
Like in Oregon, Chinese migrated to Washington territory as early as the 1850s. The discovery of gold in the rivers of Oregon, Washington, and British Columbia prompted many Chinese to migrate to the Pacific Northwest. Washington saw a large increase in Chinese population in its territory. According to the U.S. Census in 1870, there were only 234 Chinese in the territory. By 1880, there were around 4,000 Chinese immigrants in Washington territory. Chinese immigrants first started as domestic servants and service workers (cooks, laundry men). Chinese immigrants nearly doubled the number of white miners in eastern Washington. Nearly 17,000 Chinese also helped build the Northern Pacific Railroad transcontinental line in Washington State.

=== Anti-Chinese sentiments ===
There was a large Anti-Chinese sentiment in Washington during the early years of it being a territory and its statehood. Like in California, Chinese faced many discriminatory laws in Washington such as special taxes, prohibition against marrying whites, and owning land. Many whites viewed Chinese laborers as employment competitors. Even with the passing of the Chinese Exclusion Act of 1882, many Chinese laborers stayed in Washington. Because of this, many whites took this problem into their own hands.

==== Outbreak in Tacoma, 1885 ====
Tacoma had a large population of Chinese immigrants in late 1800s. Earlier signs of an outbreak was accentuated in 1884, when a water company hired Chinese workers to lay pipe. The outbreak would occur on November 3, 1885. The Tacoma chapter of the Knights of Labor joined the Anti-Chinese sentiment, as well as a newspaper publisher, The Tacoma Ledger. The riot in Tacoma was successful, expelling 700 Chinese residents.

==== Seattle Riot of 1886 ====
Like Tacoma, Seattle also saw a growth in Chinese laborers during the 1880s. A mob of 1,500 forced Chinese residents out of Seattle in 1886. Precursors began when the Seattle City Council passed a number of ordinances directly aimed against its Chinese residents. Members of the Knights of Labor chapter in Seattle then organized a movement against Chinese laborers. On February 7, many "committees" demanded Chinese to leave Seattle by the ship Queen of the Pacific. After reaching the docks with the Chinese and their baggage, Sheriff John McGraw ordered the mob of committees to disperse and told Chinese residents that they were not obliged to leave. Although the Sheriff promised to protect the Chinese, many decided to leave rather than stay. On February 8, 97 Chinese boarded the Queen of the Pacific. Another 110 Chinese would leave on February 14, 1886, with the remaining 50 Chinese scheduled to leave by train the following week.

== Idaho ==
=== History ===
Idaho was last to see Chinese immigration. The Chinese came soon after the rush to Idaho of prospective miners in 1862. In 1869, after the completion of the transcontinental railroad, thousands of former railroad laborers migrated to Idaho in search of economic independence. Many of these laborers were Chinese. Although they were the last of the Pacific Northwest territories to see a migration of Chinese, they would have the largest percentage of Chinese population per capita in the United States by 1870. By 1870, there were 4,274 Chinese immigrants living in Idaho's territory. They constituted nearly 30 percent of Idaho's total population of 14,999.

=== Anti-Chinese sentiments ===
Like both Washington and Oregon, anti-Chinese sentiment was prominent in Idaho. Together with the Chinese Exclusion Act of 1882, Idaho passed the anti-miscegenation law. Because of these laws, many Chinese men were unable to marry and have children. This led to a diminished Chinese population in the state. By 1910, Idaho had only 859 Chinese residents in contrast to its 4,000 residents in 1870.

Unlike Washington and Oregon however, Chinese residents in Idaho had more freedom in a number of entities. For example, Chinese laborers had access to Idaho's legal courts. They were allowed to file complaints against both Chinese and whites. Chinese children were also integrated into the public schools. And in the 1890s, although no Chinese applied for citizenship, they were granted access to vote.

== See also ==
- Anti-Chinese violence in Oregon
- Anti-Chinese violence in Washington
- Chinatown, Salem, Oregon
- Chinese Exclusion Act
- History of Chinese Americans in Seattle
- List of United States immigration legislation
- Knights of Labor
