= Live Oak, California =

Live Oak, California may refer to:

- Live Oak, Santa Cruz County, California
- Live Oak, Sutter County, California
- Quercus agrifolia, California Live Oak tree
