= Warrington Township, Pennsylvania =

Warrington Township is the name of two townships in the US state of Pennsylvania:

- Warrington Township, Bucks County, Pennsylvania
- Warrington Township, York County, Pennsylvania
