= Yuk L. Yung =

Hong Kong-American planetary scientist (1946–2026)

Yuk-ling Yung (Chinese: 翁玉林; pinyin: Wóng Yùlín; August 23, 1946 – March 16, 2026) was a Hong Kong physicist who was a Professor of Planetary Science at the California Institute of Technology from 1986.

== Life and career ==
=== Education ===
Yung was educated at the University of California, Berkeley, earning B.S. in Engineering Physics, with honors, and at Harvard University, acquiring a Ph.D. in Physics in 1974.

=== Specialization ===
Yung specialized in the physics and chemistry of planetary atmospheres. He worked on a number of NASA projects including Galileo, Cassini-Huygens, and the Earth Observing System.

=== Research ===
In an article in journal Science, it was reported that planetary science professor Yuk Yung, along with physics research scientist Tracey Tromp, Assistant Professor of Geochemistry John Eiler, planetary science research scientist Run-Lie Shia, and Jet Propulsion Laboratory scientist Mark Allen, were concerned that leaked hydrogen gas for use in hydrogen cars, in a hydrogen economy, could indirectly cause as much as a 10-percent decrease in atmospheric ozone.

California Institute of Technology report that the leaked hydrogen gas that would inevitably result from a hydrogen economy, if it accumulates, could indirectly cause as much as a 10-percent decrease in atmospheric ozone.

=== Death ===
Yung died on March 16, 2026, at the age of 79, after a brief illness.

== Awards ==
Yung won the NASA Exceptional Scientific Achievement Medal in 2004 and became the first Taiwanese winner of the Kuiper Award in 2015. He was cited in the American Men and Women of Science.

== Related scientists ==
His climate and space research relates to the work of Professor Kenneth J. Hsu (Swiss Federal Institute of Technology), Dr. Charles A Perry (United States Geological Survey) and Henrik Svensmark (Danish Meteorological Institute), in particular in the field of carbon-fluxing.

== Publications ==
As of 2015, he was the author of more than 300 scholarly papers and two books:

- Atmospheric Radiation: Theoretical Basis, R.M. Goody and Y.L. Yung, Oxford University Press, New York, 1989.
- Photochemistry of Planetary Atmospheres, Y.L. Yung and W. D. DeMore, Oxford University Press, 1999.
