= Sanford Yung =

Sanford Yung Yung-tao (Chinese: 容永道; 3 October 1927 – 7 November 2013) was a Hong Kong accountant, politician and racehorse owner.

Yung was born in Hong Kong in 1927 with family roots in Zhongshan county, Guangdong, China. His step-grandfather Yung Wing was China's first overseas student and Sanford Yung was also the first Chinese to apprenticed as a chartered accountant in the accounting firm Davidson and Workman in Glasgow, Scotland.

== Early career ==
After he finished his accountancy training, Yung returned to Hong Kong in the 1950s and set up the Sanford Yung & Co in 1962. In 1965, the firm became part of British firm Coopers & Lybrand. Yung became the chairman since and held that position until he retired in 1992. Six years later, the company merged with other firms to become part of the global accounting firm PricewaterhouseCoopers (PwC). In 2001, Yung formed the Sanford Yung Scholar for Excellence in Accounting Studies to pay tuition fees for accounting students in Hong Kong, Beijing and Shanghai and arrange internships for them at PwC in London and New York.

Yung also played a role in preparations for the transfer of sovereignty over Hong Kong during the 1980s as a member of the Hong Kong Basic Law Drafting Committee. According to the Democratic Party founding chairman Martin Lee, Yung was perceived as a liberal among the pro-Beijing camp.

== Horse Ownership ==
Yung was also known as the owner of legendary galloper Silver Lining. Yung bought Silver Lining for HK$50,000 in 1977 and it won a number of championships and became the first local horse to win more than HK$1 million. He once said that while he was "happy and proud" of Silver Lining's success, he often slept badly the night before a race, worrying that the horse would break down under the "super weights" it had to carry of up to 69 kg. He was also an honorary voting member of Hong Kong Jockey Club.

== Television Commercials ==
Yung appeared in an American Express TV commercial with Silver Lining in 1984.

== Death ==
Yung suffered from cancer for some years in his later life. He died peacefully on 7 November 2013 in his sleep with his family by his side at the age of 86.
