= The Sporting News MLB Player of the Year Award =

Annual baseball award

The Sporting News Player of the Year Award
- Sport: Baseball
- League: Major League Baseball
- Awarded for: Most outstanding player
- Country: United States, Canada
- Presented by: The Sporting News

History
- First award: 1936 – Carl Hubbell
- Most recent: 2026 – Pete Crow-Armstrong

The Sporting News Player of the Year Award is awarded annually by The Sporting News to the most outstanding player in Major League Baseball. The honor was first given in 1936.

== History ==
The Sporting News established their Player of the Year award in 1936. It is the oldest still-extant award given to the single player in MLB who had the most outstanding season. Until 1969, it was the only major award given to a single player across MLB, rather than to a player in each league. In 1969, Baseball Digest began its Player of the Year award for one player in all of MLB. (The award became limited to position players in 1994, when Baseball Digest added a new award for "Pitcher of the Year.") In 1993, the first Best Major League Baseball Player ESPY Award was given. In 1998, the Major League Baseball Players Association (MLBPA) began its own Player of the Year award, for one player in all of MLB, as part of its Players Choice Awards. Baseball America also began its Major League Player of the Year award in 1998. In 2012, MLB's "GIBBY Awards" added an MLB Most Valuable Player category, which was renamed the Most Valuable Major Leaguer in 2014; its current name is the "Esurance MLB Awards" Best Major Leaguer.

== Winners ==
=== Key ===
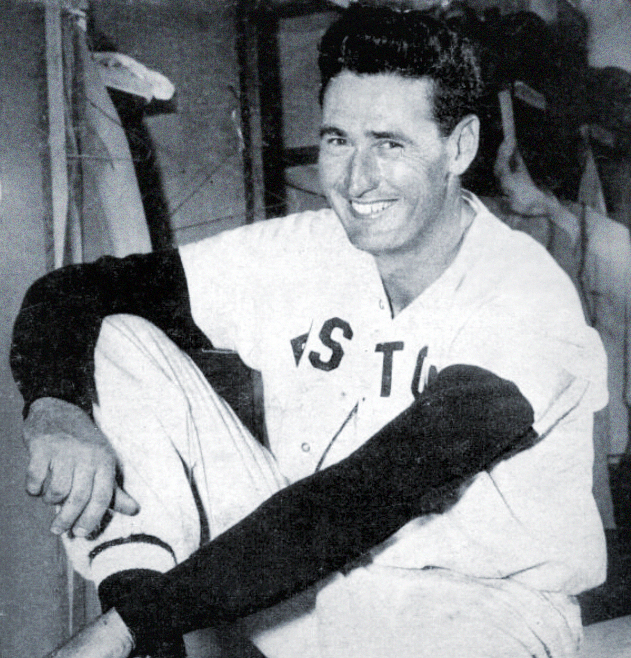
Hall of Famer Ted Williams, five-time winner

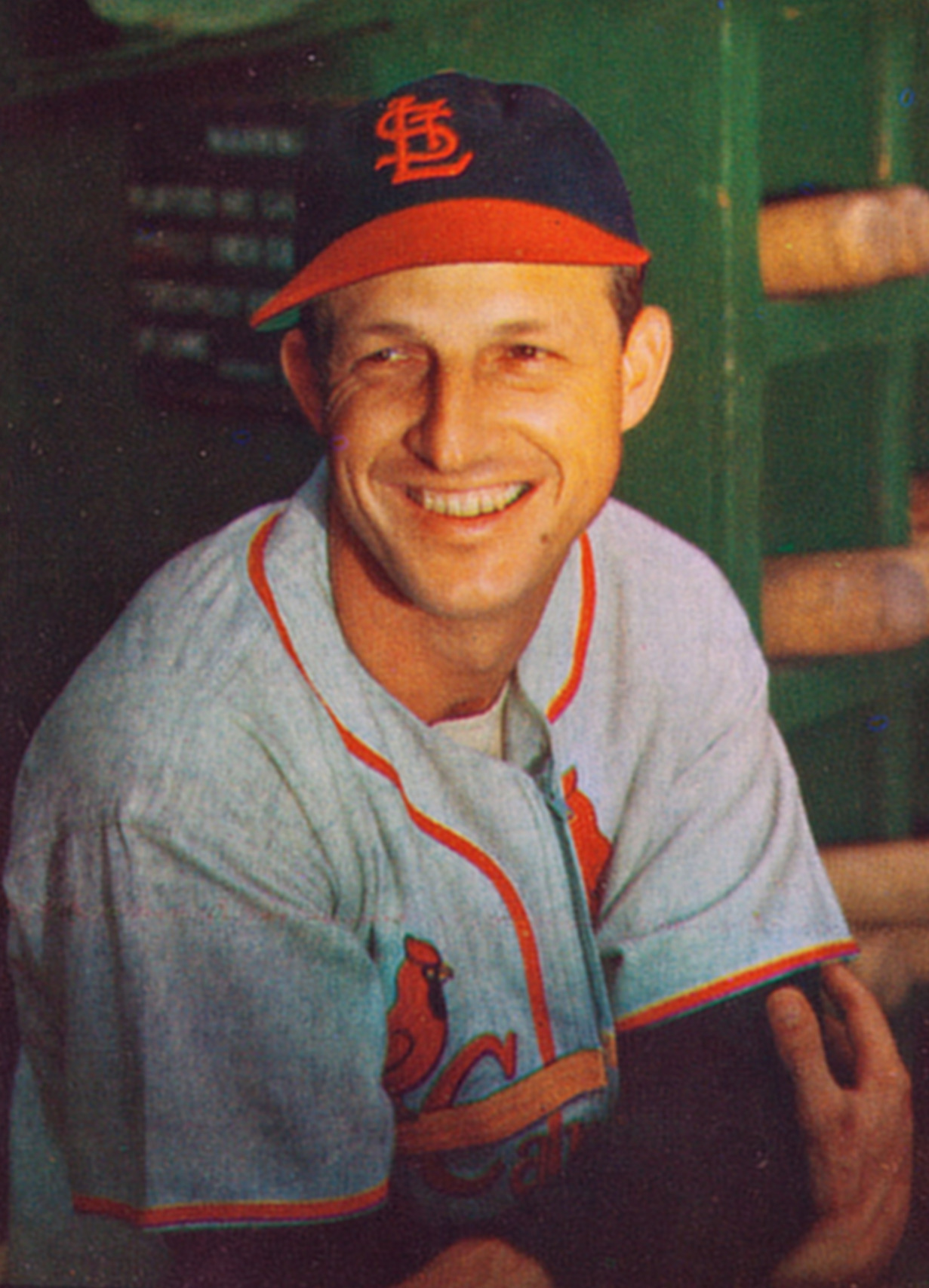
Hall of Famer Stan Musial, two-time winner

NL	National League
AL	American League
P	Pitcher
C	Catcher
1B	First baseman
2B	Second baseman
3B	Third baseman
SS	Shortstop
OF	Outfielder
DH	Designated hitter
BA	Batting average
RBI	Run batted in
HR	Home runs
W-L	Win Loss Record
K	Strikeouts
ERA	Earned run average
SB	Stolen bases
R	Runs scored
^{†}	Member of the National Baseball Hall of Fame and Museum
	Player is active
*	Led League

=== Awardees ===
Hall of Famer Sandy Koufax, 2-time winner.

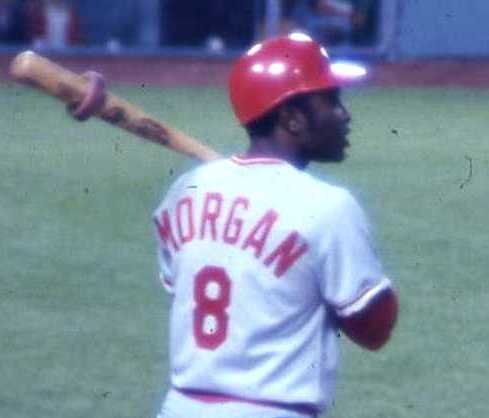
Hall of Famer Joe Morgan, 2-time winner.

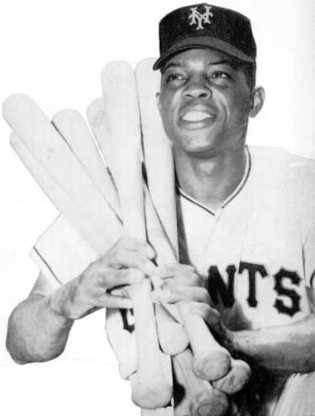
Hall of Famer Willie Mays with the Giants in 1954.

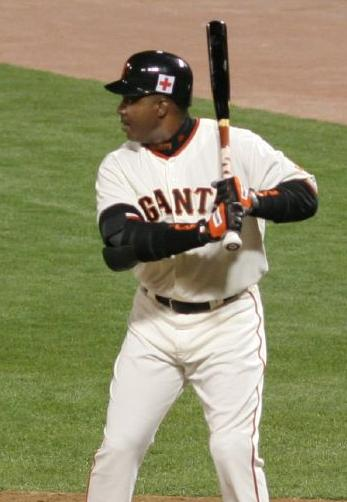
3-time winner Barry Bonds at the plate with the Giants

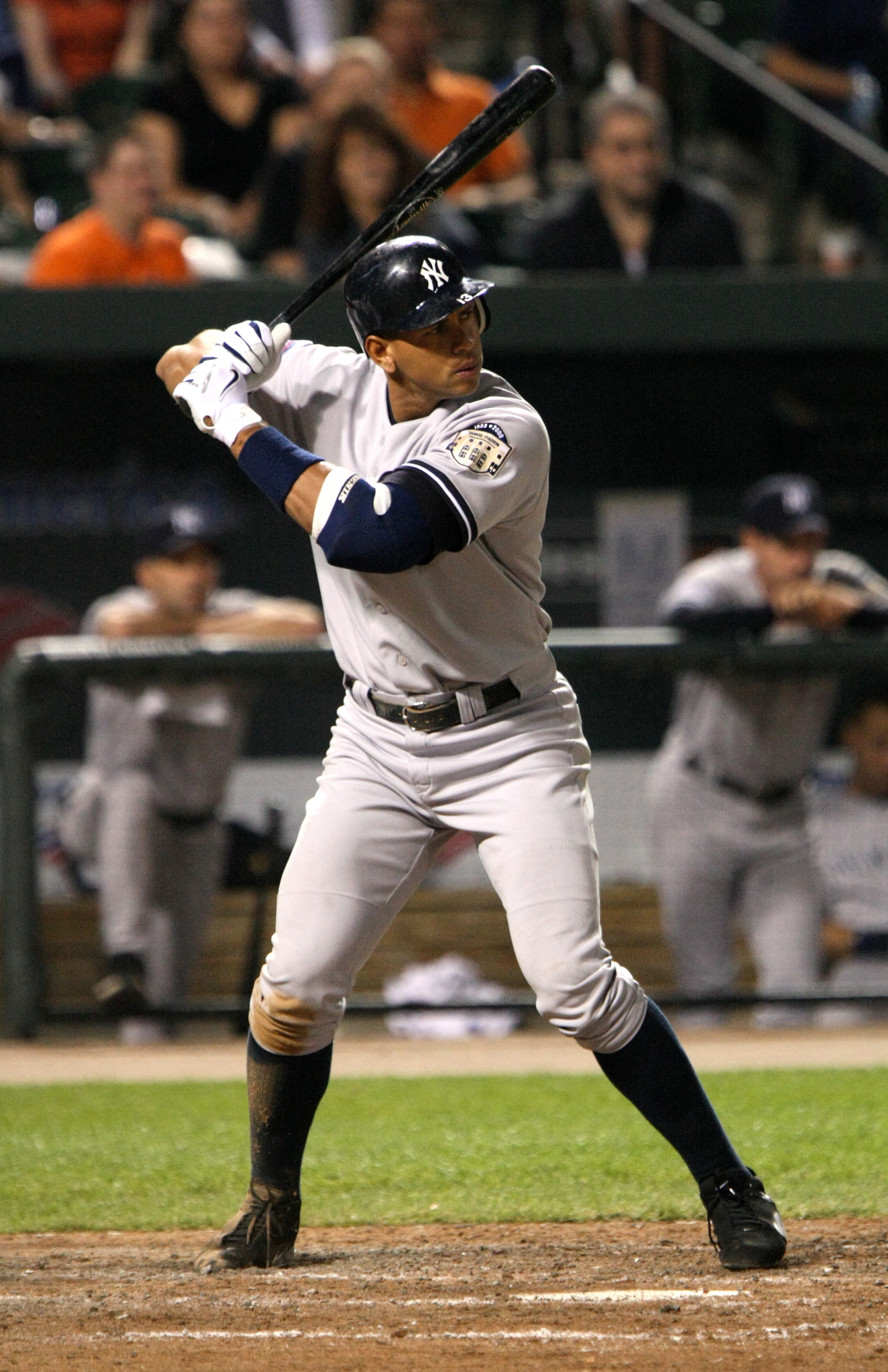
3-time winner Alex Rodriguez as a New York Yankee

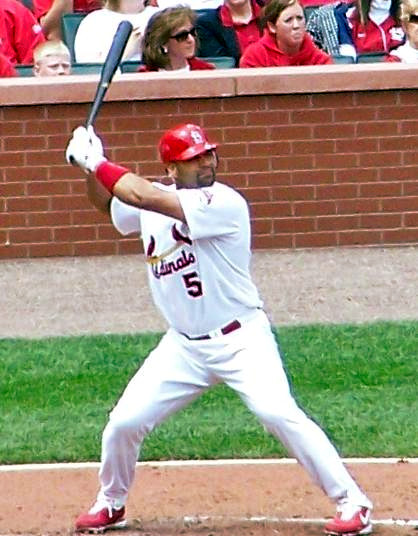
3-time winner Albert Pujols

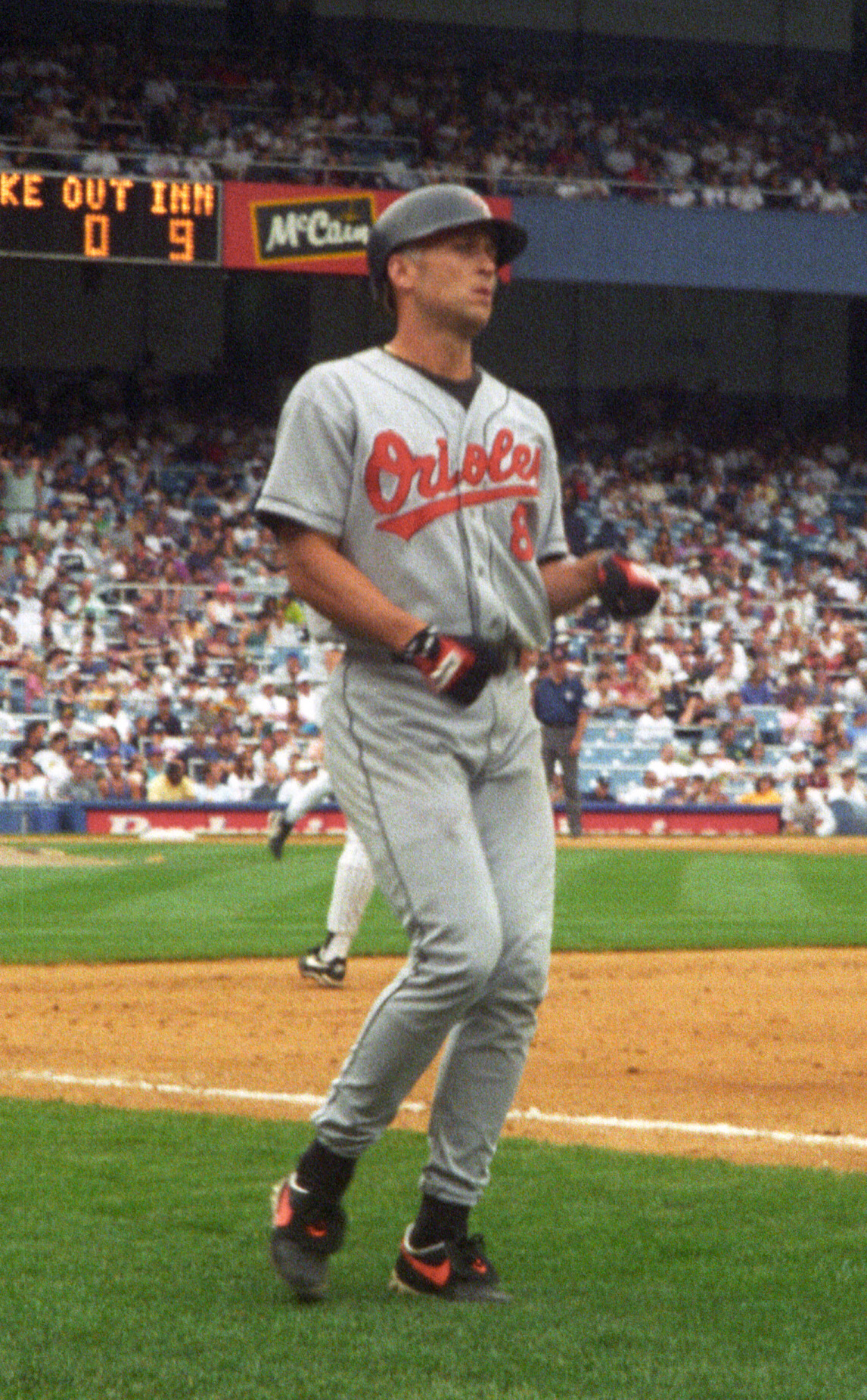
Hall of Famer Cal Ripken Jr., 2-time winner at Yankee Stadium

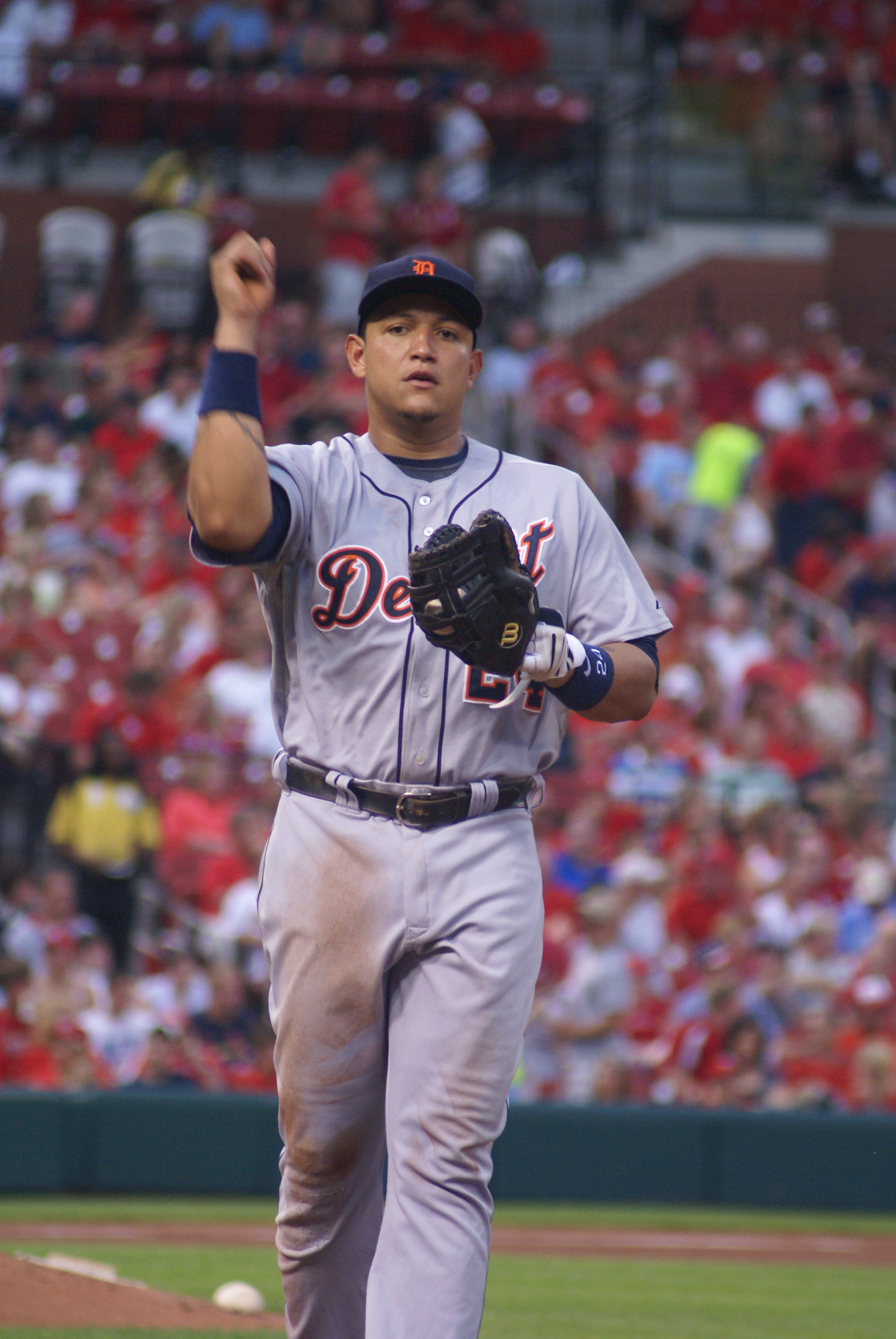
2-time winner Miguel Cabrera

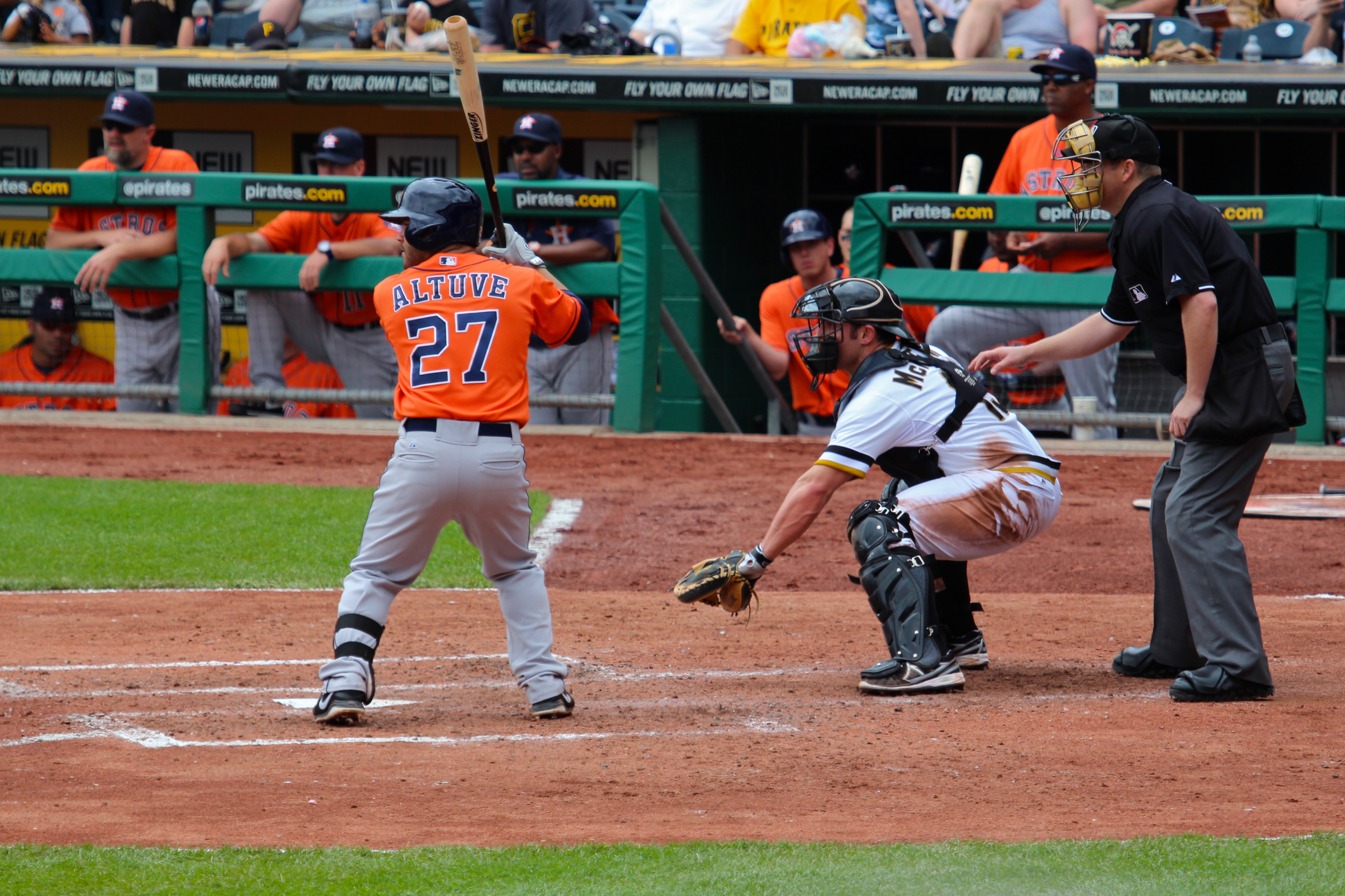
2-time winner Altuve batting against the Pittsburgh Pirates, May 19, 2013

Year	Name	Club	League	Pos	Notes	References
1936	Carl Hubbell^{†}	New York Giants	NL	P	W-L: 26*-6, ERA: 2.31*, K: 123	
1937	Johnny Allen	Cleveland Indians	AL	P	W-L: 15-1, ERA: 2.55, K: 87	
1938	Johnny Vander Meer	Cincinnati Reds	NL	P	W-L: 15-10, ERA: 3.12, K: 125	
1939	Joe DiMaggio^{†}	New York Yankees	AL	OF	BA: .381*, RBI: 126, HR: 30	
1940	Bob Feller^{†}	Cleveland Indians	AL	P	W-L: 27*-11, ERA: 2.61*, K: 261*, AL Triple Crown	
1941	Ted Williams^{†(1)}	Boston Red Sox	AL	OF	BA: .406*, RBI: 120, HR: 37*, Runs: 135*, BB: 147*	
1942	Ted Williams^{†(2)}	Boston Red Sox	AL	OF	BA: .356*, RBI: 137*, HR: 36*, Runs: 141*, BB: 145*, MLB Triple Crown	
1943	Spud Chandler	New York Yankees	AL	P	W-L:20*-4, ERA:1.64*, K:134	
1944	Marty Marion	St. Louis Cardinals	NL	SS	BA: .263, RBI: 63, HR: 6	
1945	Hal Newhouser^{†}	Detroit Tigers	AL	P	W-L: 25*-9, ERA: 1.81*, K: 212*, MLB Triple Crown	
1946	Stan Musial^{†(1)}	St. Louis Cardinals	NL	1B	BA: .365*, RBI: 103, HR: 16, Runs: 124*	
1947	Ted Williams^{†(3)}	Boston Red Sox	AL	OF	BA: .343*, RBI: 114*, HR: 32*, Runs: 125*, BB: 162*, AL Triple Crown	
1948	Lou Boudreau^{†}	Cleveland Indians	AL	SS	BA: .355, RBI: 106, HR: 18	
1949	Ted Williams^{†(4)}	Boston Red Sox	AL	OF	BA: .343, RBI: 159*, HR: 43*, Runs: 150*, BB: 162*	
1950	Phil Rizzuto^{†}	New York Yankees	AL	SS	BA: .324, RBI: 66, HR: 7	
1951	Stan Musial^{†(2)}	St. Louis Cardinals	NL	OF	BA: .355*, RBI: 108, HR: 32, Runs: 124	
1952	Robin Roberts^{†}	Philadelphia Phillies	NL	P	W-L: 28*-7, ERA: 2.59, K: 148	
1953	Al Rosen	Cleveland Indians	AL	3B	BA: .336, RBI: 145, HR: 43	
1954	Willie Mays^{†}	New York Giants	NL	OF	BA: .345*, RBI: 110, HR: 41, Runs: 119	
1955	Duke Snider^{†}	Brooklyn Dodgers	NL	OF	BA: .309, RBI: 136*, HR: 42, Runs: 126*	
1956	Mickey Mantle^{†}	New York Yankees	AL	OF	BA: .353*, RBI: 130*, HR: 52*, Runs: 132*, MLB Triple Crown	
1957	Ted Williams^{†(5)}	Boston Red Sox	AL	OF	BA: .388*, RBI: 87, HR: 38, BB: 119	
1958	Bob Turley	New York Yankees	AL	P	W-L: 21*-7, ERA: 2.97, K: 168	
1959	Early Wynn^{†}	Chicago White Sox	AL	P	W-L: 22*-10, ERA: 3.17, K: 179	
1960	Bill Mazeroski^{†}	Pittsburgh Pirates	NL	2B	BA: .273, RBI: 64, HR: 11, Gold Glove	
1961	Roger Maris	New York Yankees	AL	OF	BA: .269, RBI: 141*, HR: 61*, Runs: 132*, Single Season Home Run Record	
1962	Maury Wills	Los Angeles Dodgers	NL	SS	BA: .299, RBI: 48, HR: 6, SB: 104*	
1962	Don Drysdale^{†}	Los Angeles Dodgers	NL	P	W-L: 25*-9, ERA: 2.83 K: 232*	
1963	Sandy Koufax^{†(1)}	Los Angeles Dodgers	NL	P	W-L: 25*-5, ERA: 1.88* K: 306*, MLB Triple Crown	
1964	Ken Boyer	St. Louis Cardinals	NL	3B	BA: .295, RBI: 119*, HR: 24	
1965	Sandy Koufax^{†(2)}	Los Angeles Dodgers	NL	P	W-L: 26*-8, ERA: 2.04* K: 382*, MLB Triple Crown	
1966	Frank Robinson^{†}	Baltimore Orioles	AL	OF	BA: .316*, RBI: 122*, HR: 49*, Runs: 122, AL Triple Crown	
1967	Carl Yastrzemski^{†}	Boston Red Sox	AL	OF	BA: .326*, RBI: 121*, HR: 44*, Runs: 112*, AL Triple Crown	
1968	Denny McLain	Detroit Tigers	AL	P	W-L: 31*-6, ERA: 1.96 K: 280	
1969	Willie McCovey^{†}	San Francisco Giants	NL	1B	BA: .320, RBI: 126*, HR: 45*	
1970	Johnny Bench^{†}	Cincinnati Reds	NL	C	BA: .293, RBI: 148*, HR: 45*	
1971	Joe Torre^{†}	St. Louis Cardinals	NL	3B	BA: .363*, RBI: 137, HR: 24	
1972	Billy Williams^{†}	Chicago Cubs	NL	OF	BA: .333*, RBI: 122, HR: 37	
1973	Reggie Jackson^{†}	Oakland Athletics	AL	OF	BA: .293, RBI: 117*, HR: 32*, Runs: 99*	
1974	Lou Brock^{†}	St. Louis Cardinals	NL	OF	BA: .306, RBI: 48, HR: 3, SB: 118*, R: 105	
1975	Joe Morgan^{†(1)}	Cincinnati Reds	NL	2B	BA: .327, RBI: 94, HR: 17, SB: 67, R: 107	
1976	Joe Morgan^{†(2)}	Cincinnati Reds	NL	2B	BA: .320, RBI: 111, HR: 27, SB: 60, R: 113	
1977	Rod Carew^{†}	Minnesota Twins	AL	1B	BA: .388*, RBI: 100, HR: 14, SB: 23, R: 128*	
1978	Ron Guidry	New York Yankees	AL	P	W-L: 25*-3, ERA: 1.74* K: 248	
1979	Willie Stargell^{†}	Pittsburgh Pirates	NL	1B	BA: .281, RBI: 82, HR: 32	
1980	George Brett^{†}	Kansas City Royals	AL	3B	BA: .390*, RBI: 118, HR: 24	
1981	Fernando Valenzuela	Los Angeles Dodgers	NL	P	W-L 13-7, ERA: 2.48 K: 180*	
1982	Robin Yount^{†}	Milwaukee Brewers	AL	SS	BA: .331 RBI: 114, HR: 29	
1983	Cal Ripken Jr.^{†(1)}	Baltimore Orioles	AL	SS	BA: .318 RBI: 102, HR: 27, Runs: 121*	
1984	Ryne Sandberg^{†}	Chicago Cubs	NL	2B	BA: .314 RBI: 84, HR: 19, Runs: 114	
1985	Don Mattingly	New York Yankees	AL	1B	BA: .324 RBI: 145*, HR: 35	
1986	Roger Clemens	Boston Red Sox	AL	P	W-L: 24*-4, ERA: 2.48*, K: 238	
1987	George Bell	Toronto Blue Jays	AL	OF	BA: .308 RBI: 134*, HR: 47	
1988	Orel Hershiser	Los Angeles Dodgers	NL	P	W-L: 23*-8, ERA: 2.26, K: 178	
1989	Kevin Mitchell	San Francisco Giants	NL	OF	BA: .291 RBI: 125*, HR: 47*	
1990	Barry Bonds^{(1)}	Pittsburgh Pirates	NL	OF	BA: .301, RBI: 114, HR: 33	
1991	Cal Ripken Jr.^{†(2)}	Baltimore Orioles	AL	SS	BA: .323, RBI: 114, HR: 34	
1992	Gary Sheffield	San Diego Padres	NL	OF	BA: .330*, RBI: 100, HR: 33	
1993	Frank Thomas^{†}	Chicago White Sox	AL	1B	BA: .317, RBI: 128, HR: 41	
1994	Jeff Bagwell^{†}	Houston Astros	NL	1B	BA: .368, RBI: 116*, HR: 39, Runs: 104*	
1995	Albert Belle	Cleveland Indians	AL	OF	BA: .317, RBI: 126*, HR: 50*, Runs: 121*	
1996	Alex Rodriguez^{(1)}	Seattle Mariners	AL	SS	BA: .358*, RBI: 123, HR: 36, Runs: 141*	
1997	Ken Griffey Jr.^{†}	Seattle Mariners	AL	OF	BA: .304, RBI: 147*, HR: 56*, Runs: 125	
1998	Sammy Sosa	Chicago Cubs	NL	OF	BA: .308, RBI: 158*, HR: 66, Runs: 134*	
1999	Rafael Palmeiro	Texas Rangers	AL	1B	BA: .324, RBI: 148, HR: 47	
2000	Carlos Delgado	Toronto Blue Jays	AL	1B	BA: .344, RBI: 137, HR: 41, Runs: 115	
2001	Barry Bonds^{(2)}	San Francisco Giants	NL	OF	BA: .328, RBI: 137, HR: 73*, Runs: 129, BB: 177*, Single Season Home Run Record	
2002	Alex Rodriguez^{(2)}	Texas Rangers	AL	SS	BA: .300, RBI: 142*, HR: 57*, Runs: 125, Gold Glove	
2003	Albert Pujols^{(1)}	St. Louis Cardinals	NL	1B	BA: .359*, RBI: 124, HR: 43, Runs: 137*	
2004	Barry Bonds^{(3)}	San Francisco Giants	NL	OF	BA: .362*, RBI: 101, HR: 45, Runs: 129, BB: 232*	
2005	Andruw Jones	Atlanta Braves	NL	OF	BA: .263, RBI: 128, HR: 51*, Runs: 95*, Gold Glove	
2006	Ryan Howard	Philadelphia Phillies	NL	1B	BA: .313, RBI: 149*, HR: 58*, Runs: 104	
2007	Alex Rodriguez^{(3)}	New York Yankees	AL	3B	BA: .314, RBI: 156*, HR: 54*, Runs: 143*	
2008	Albert Pujols^{(2)}	St. Louis Cardinals	NL	1B	BA: .357, RBI: 116, HR: 37, Runs: 100	
2009	Albert Pujols^{(3)}	St. Louis Cardinals	NL	1B	BA: .327, RBI: 135, HR: 47*	
2010	Josh Hamilton	Texas Rangers	AL	OF	BA: .359*, RBI: 100, HR: 32	
2011	Justin Verlander	Detroit Tigers	AL	P	W-L: 24*-5, ERA: 2.40*, K: 250*, AL Triple Crown	
2012	Miguel Cabrera^{(1)}	Detroit Tigers	AL	3B	BA: .330*, RBI: 139*, HR: 44*, Runs: 109, AL Triple Crown	
2013	Miguel Cabrera^{(2)}	Detroit Tigers	AL	3B	BA: .348*, RBI: 137, HR: 44, Runs: 103	
2014	Clayton Kershaw	Los Angeles Dodgers	NL	P	W-L: 21*-3, ERA: 1.77*, K: 239	
2015	Josh Donaldson	Toronto Blue Jays	AL	3B	BA: .297, RBI: 123*, HR: 41, Runs: 108	
2016	Jose Altuve^{(1)}	Houston Astros	AL	2B	BA: .338*, RBI: 96, HR: 24, Runs: 108	
2017	Jose Altuve^{(2)}	Houston Astros	AL	2B	BA: .346*, RBI: 81, HR: 24, Runs: 112	
2018	Mookie Betts	Boston Red Sox	AL	OF	BA: .346*, RBI: 80, HR: 32, Runs: 129*, SLG:.640	
2019	Mike Trout	Los Angeles Angels	AL	OF	BA: .291, RBI: 104, HR: 45, Runs: 110, SLG:.645*	
2020	José Abreu	Chicago White Sox	AL	1B	BA: .317, RBI: 60*, HR: 19, Runs: 43, SLG: .617*, Hits: 76*	
2021	Shohei Ohtani^{(1)}	Los Angeles Angels	AL	P / DH	W-L: 9-2, ERA: 3.18, K: 156; BA: .257, RBI: 100, HR: 46, Runs: 103, SLG: .592, SB: 26	
2022	Aaron Judge	New York Yankees	AL	OF / DH	BA: .311, Runs: 133*, HR: 62*, RBI: 131*, BB: 111*, OBP: .425*, SLG: .686*, OPS: 1.111*, TB: 391*	
2023	Ronald Acuña	Atlanta Braves	NL	OF / DH	BA: .337, OBP: .416*, Runs: 149*, Hits: 217*, HR: 41, RBI: 106, SB: 73*, BB: 80, OBP: .416*, SLG: .596, OPS: 1.012*, TB: 383*	
2024	Shohei Ohtani^{(2)}	Los Angeles Dodgers	NL	DH	BA: .310, OBP: .390*, RBI: 130*, HR: 54*, Runs: 134*, SLG: .646*, OPS: 1.036*, SB: 59	
2025	Cal Raleigh	Seattle Mariners	AL	C	BA: .247, OBP: .359, RBI: 125*, HR: 60*, Runs: 110, SLG: .589, OPS: .948, SB: 14	
2026	Pete Crow-Armstrong	Chicago Cubs	NL	OF	BA: .280, OBP: .372, RBI: 108, HR: 45*, Runs: 119*, SLG: .570*, OPS: .943*, SB: 41	

== Multiple wins ==
=== Players ===
Several players have won the award more than once. Ted Williams, Joe Morgan, Albert Pujols, Miguel Cabrera, and Jose Altuve are the only players to win the award in consecutive years. Ted Williams won the award five times. Sandy Koufax is the only pitcher to win the award more than once. Alex Rodriguez, Barry Bonds, and Shohei Ohtani are the only players to win the award while playing with different teams. Alex Rodriguez won the award with the most teams (3). Stan Musial and Alex Rodriguez are the only players to win the award while playing different positions. The only tie was in 1962, when Don Drysdale and Maury Wills shared the honor.

Winning multiple SN Player of the Year awards has been seen as guaranteed admission to the National Baseball Hall of Fame. Barry Bonds is the only player with multiple awards, eligible for the Hall of Fame, but not a member of the Hall of Fame. The table is of the Players that have won two or more awards and the year they were inducted into Major League Baseball Hall of Fame. Active players are not eligible for the Hall of Fame.

Player	# of Awards	Years	Year inducted into HOF
Ted Williams ^{†}	5	1941–1942, 1947, 1949, 1957	1966
Barry Bonds	3	1990, 2001, 2004	-
Alex Rodriguez	3	1996, 2002, 2007	-
Albert Pujols	3	2003, 2008–2009	Not Yet Eligible
Stan Musial ^{†}	2	1946, 1951	1969
Sandy Koufax ^{†}	2	1963, 1965	1972
Joe Morgan ^{†}	2	1975–1976	1990
Cal Ripken Jr. ^{†}	2	1983, 1991	2007
Miguel Cabrera	2	2012–2013	Not Yet Eligible
Jose Altuve	2	2016–2017	Active-Not Eligible
Shohei Ohtani	2	2021, 2024	Active-Not Eligible

Outfielders and Pitchers have won the most awards.

Position	# of Awards
Outfield	31
Pitcher	19
First Baseman	14
Shortstop	9
Third Baseman	8
Second Baseman	6
Catcher	2
DH	1

== Player of the Decade ==
- SN named Willie Mays as the player of the 1960s decade.
- SN named Pete Rose as the player of the 1970s decade.
- SN named Mike Schmidt as the player of the 1980s decade.
- SN named Barry Bonds as the player of the 1990s decade.
- SN named Albert Pujols as the player of the 2000s decade.
- SN named Mike Trout as the player of the 2010s decade.

== See also ==
- Players Choice Awards Player of the Year (in MLB; for all positions) (there are also Outstanding Player and Outstanding Pitcher awards in each league)
- Baseball America Major League Player of the Year (in MLB; for all positions)
- Best Major League Baseball Player ESPY Award (in MLB; for all positions)
- "Esurance MLB Awards" Best Major Leaguer (MLB award for best player, including all positions) (also Best Hitter and Best Pitcher)
- Baseball Digest Player of the Year (in MLB; for position players) (from 1969 to 1993, included all positions; in 1994, a separate Pitcher of the Year award was added)
- Major League Baseball Most Valuable Player Award (in each league; for all positions)
- Cy Young Award (MLB award for top pitcher in each league)
- The Sporting News Most Valuable Player Award (in each league) (discontinued in 1946)
- Baseball awards
- List of MLB awards
- TSN Pitcher of the Year (replaced by Starting Pitcher and Relief Pitcher awards)
- TSN Starting Pitcher of the Year
- TSN Relief Pitcher of the Year
- TSN Rookie of the Year
- SN Reliever of the Year
- TSN Comeback Player of the Year
- TSN Manager of the Year
- TSN Executive of the Year
