= In-between hop =

Baseball term

An in-between hop is that term in baseball which indicates a bounced baseball that reaches an infielder at the midpoint of its upward bounce. As a fielder in this instance typically cannot respond to the path of the ball quickly enough, players try to avoid encounters with in-between hops. While ground balls and throws in the dirt usually do not change direction, such factors as the spin of the baseball or imperfections of the playing surface can influence a bounce. An in-between hop contrasts with a short hop, which refers to a baseball that reaches an infielder immediately after it bounces.

The in-between hop is often responsible for errors in infield play. In a December 2003 Baseball Digest interview, first baseman John Olerud cites the in-between hop as the toughest play for a fielder to handle.
