= Best Major League Baseball Player ESPY Award =

Annual athletic award

The Best Major League Baseball Player ESPY Award, known alternatively as the Best Baseball Player ESPY Award, has been presented annually since 1993 to the Major League Baseball (MLB) player adjudged to be the best in a given calendar year, typically most significantly in the MLB season in progress during the holding of the ESPY Awards ceremony.

Between 1993 and 2004, the award voting panel comprised variously fans; sportswriters and broadcasters, sports executives, and retired sportspersons, termed collectively experts; and retired sportspersons, but balloting thereafter has been exclusively by fans over the Internet from amongst choices selected by the ESPN Select Nominating Committee. The award wasn't awarded in 2020 due to the COVID-19 pandemic.

== List of winners ==
Through the 2001 iteration of the ESPY Awards, ceremonies were conducted in February of each year to honor achievements over the previous calendar year; awards presented thereafter are conferred in July and reflect performance from the June previous.

Player was a member of the winning team in the World Series.
Player was a member of the losing team in the World Series.
* Major League Baseball MVP
† World Series MVP

Year	Player	Position played	Team represented
1994	Barry Bonds*	Left fielder	San Francisco Giants
1995^{1}	Jeff Bagwell*	First baseman	Houston Astros
1996	Greg Maddux	Starting pitcher	Atlanta Braves
1997	Ken Caminiti*	Third baseman	San Diego Padres
1998	Larry Walker*	Right fielder	Colorado Rockies
1999	Mark McGwire	First baseman	St. Louis Cardinals
2000	Pedro Martínez	Starting pitcher	Boston Red Sox
2001	Pedro Martínez (2)	Starting pitcher	Boston Red Sox
2002	Barry Bonds* (2)	Left Fielder	San Francisco Giants
2003	Barry Bonds* (3)	Left fielder	San Francisco Giants
2004	Barry Bonds* (4)	Left fielder	San Francisco Giants
2005	Albert Pujols	First baseman	St. Louis Cardinals
2006	Albert Pujols* (2)	First baseman	St. Louis Cardinals
2007	Derek Jeter	Shortstop	New York Yankees
2008	Alex Rodriguez*	Third baseman	New York Yankees
2009	Albert Pujols (3)	First baseman	St. Louis Cardinals
2010	Albert Pujols* (4)	First baseman	St. Louis Cardinals
2011	Roy Halladay	Starting pitcher	Philadelphia Phillies
2012	Josh Hamilton	Outfielder	Texas Rangers
2013	Miguel Cabrera*	Third baseman	Detroit Tigers
2014	Miguel Cabrera* (2)	First baseman	Detroit Tigers
2015	Mike Trout	Outfielder	Los Angeles Angels of Anaheim
2016	Bryce Harper*	Outfielder	Washington Nationals
2017	Mike Trout* (2)	Outfielder	Los Angeles Angels
2018	Mike Trout (3)	Outfielder	Los Angeles Angels
2019	Christian Yelich	Outfielder	Milwaukee Brewers
2020	Not awarded due to the COVID-19 pandemic		
2021	Shohei Ohtani*	Designated hitter / pitcher	Los Angeles Angels
2022	Shohei Ohtani (2)	Designated hitter / pitcher	Los Angeles Angels
2023	Shohei Ohtani* (3)	Designated hitter / pitcher	Los Angeles Angels
2024	Shohei Ohtani* (4)	Designated hitter / pitcher	Los Angeles Dodgers
2025	Shohei Ohtani* (5)	Designated hitter / pitcher	Los Angeles Dodgers
2026	Shohei Ohtani* (6)	Designated hitter / pitcher	Los Angeles Dodgers

^{1}The 1994 and 1995 seasons were shortened due to the 1994–95 Major League Baseball strike.

== See also ==
- Players Choice Awards Player of the Year (in MLB; for all positions) (there are also Outstanding Player and Outstanding Pitcher awards in each league)
- Baseball America Major League Player of the Year (in MLB; for all positions)
- The Sporting News Player of the Year Award (in MLB; for all positions) (Sporting News also has a Pitcher of the Year award for each league)
- The Sporting News Most Valuable Player Award (in each league) (discontinued in 1946)
- Baseball Digest Player of the Year (in MLB; for position players) (from 1969 to 1993, included all positions; in 1994, a separate Pitcher of the Year award was added)
- MLB GIBBY / This Year in Baseball Awards (in MLB; Hitter of the Year, Starting Pitcher of the Year, Closer of the Year, Setup Man of the Year)
- Most Valuable Player Award (in each league; for all positions) (MLB also has the Cy Young Award for a pitcher in each league)
- Baseball awards#U.S. major leagues: Awards by organizations other than MLB
- List of MLB awards
