= Baseball America Major League Player of the Year =

Annual sporting award

- Sport: Baseball
- League: Major League Baseball
- Awarded for: The best player in the MLB
- Presented by: Baseball America

History
- First award: 1998
- Editions: 28
- First winner: Mark McGwire, 1B; St. Louis Cardinals
- Most wins: Mike Trout, OF (4 times); Los Angeles Angels
- Most recent: Pete Crow-Armstrong, OF; Chicago Cubs

The Baseball America Major League Player of the Year award is given each year by Baseball America to the best player at any position in Major League Baseball. The award was first presented in 1998.

== Key ==
Player (X)	Denotes winning player and number of times they had won the award at that point
†	Member of the National Baseball Hall of Fame as a player
^	Player is still active

== Winners ==
See footnotes

Year	Player	Team	Position	Ref
1998	Mark McGwire	St. Louis Cardinals	First baseman	
1999	Pedro Martínez*	Boston Red Sox	Pitcher	
2000	Alex Rodriguez	Seattle Mariners	Shortstop	
2001	Barry Bonds	San Francisco Giants	Outfielder	
2002	Alex Rodriguez (2)	Texas Rangers	Shortstop	
2003	Barry Bonds (2)	San Francisco Giants	Outfielder	
2004	Barry Bonds (3)	San Francisco Giants	Outfielder	
2005	Albert Pujols	St. Louis Cardinals	First baseman	
2006	Johan Santana	Minnesota Twins	Pitcher	
2007	Alex Rodriguez (3)	New York Yankees	Third baseman	
2008	CC Sabathia*	Cleveland Indians / Milwaukee Brewers	Pitcher	
2009	Joe Mauer*	Minnesota Twins	Catcher	
2010	Roy Halladay*	Philadelphia Phillies	Pitcher	
2011	Matt Kemp	Los Angeles Dodgers	Outfielder	
2012	Mike Trout^{‡}	Los Angeles Angels	Outfielder	
2013	Mike Trout^{‡} (2)	Los Angeles Angels	Outfielder	
2014	Clayton Kershaw	Los Angeles Dodgers	Pitcher	
2015	Bryce Harper^{‡}	Washington Nationals	Outfielder	
2016	Mike Trout^{‡} (3)	Los Angeles Angels	Outfielder	
2017	Jose Altuve^{‡}	Houston Astros	Second baseman	
2018	Mike Trout^{‡} (4)	Los Angeles Angels	Outfielder	
2019	Justin Verlander^{‡}	Houston Astros	Pitcher	
2020	Freddie Freeman^{‡}	Atlanta Braves	First baseman	
2021	Shohei Ohtani^{‡}	Los Angeles Angels	Pitcher / Designated hitter	
2022	Aaron Judge^{‡}	New York Yankees	Outfielder	
2023	Shohei Ohtani^{‡} (2)	Los Angeles Angels	Pitcher / Designated hitter	
2024	Aaron Judge^{‡} (2)	New York Yankees	Outfielder	
2025	Aaron Judge^{‡} (3)	New York Yankees	Outfielder	
2026	Pete Crow-Armstrong^{‡}	Chicago Cubs	Outfielder	

== See also ==
- Players Choice Awards Player of the Year (in MLB; for all positions)
- Best Major League Baseball Player ESPY Award (in MLB; for all positions)
- "Esurance MLB Awards" Best Major Leaguer (in MLB; for all positions) (also Best Hitter and Best Pitcher)
- The Sporting News Player of the Year Award (in MLB; for all positions) (Sporting News also has a Pitcher of the Year award for each league)
- The Sporting News Most Valuable Player Award (in each league) (discontinued in 1946)
- Baseball Digest Player of the Year (in MLB; for position players) (from 1969 to 1993, included all positions; in 1994, a separate Pitcher of the Year award was added)
- Kenesaw Mountain Landis Most Valuable Player Award (in each league; for all positions) (MLB also has the Cy Young Award for a pitcher in each league)
- Baseball America Rookie of the Year
- Baseball awards § U.S. major leagues: Awards by organizations other than MLB
- List of MLB awards
