= Mike Trout =

American baseball player (born 1991)

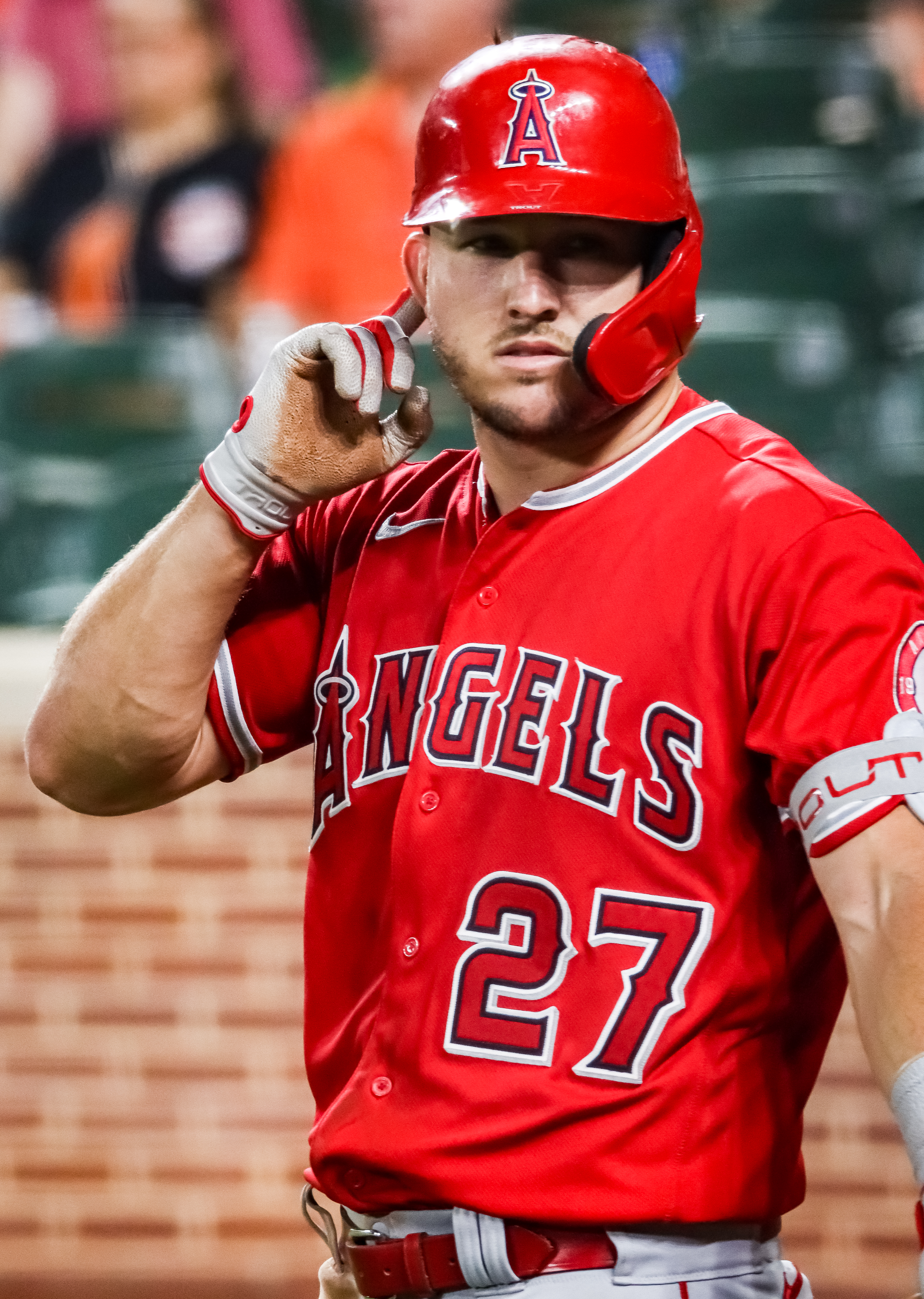
- Trout with the Los Angeles Angels in 2022

Los Angeles Angels – No. 27
- Center fielder / Designated hitter
- Born: August 7, 1991 (age 35); Vineland, New Jersey, U.S.
- Bats: Right Throws: Right

MLB debut
- July 8, 2011, for the Los Angeles Angels of Anaheim

MLB statistics (through 2026 season)
- Batting average: .290
- Home runs: 426
- Runs batted in: 1,072
- Stats at Baseball Reference

Teams
- Los Angeles Angels of Anaheim / Los Angeles Angels (2011–present)

Career highlights and awards
- 12× All-Star (2012–2019, 2021–2023, 2026); 3× AL MVP (2014, 2016, 2019); 3× All-MLB First Team (2019, 2020, 2022); AL Rookie of the Year (2012); 9× Silver Slugger Award (2012–2016, 2018–2020, 2022); 2× AL Hank Aaron Award (2014, 2019); AL RBI leader (2014); AL stolen base leader (2012)
Medals
Men's baseball
Representing United States
World Baseball Classic
Silver medal – second place	2023 Miami	Team

Michael Nelson Trout (born August 7, 1991) is an American professional baseball outfielder for the Los Angeles Angels of Major League Baseball (MLB). Trout is a 12-time All-Star, three-time American League (AL) Most Valuable Player (MVP) (winning the award in 2014, 2016, and 2019, while finishing second in 2012, 2013, 2015, and 2018), and nine-time winner of the Silver Slugger Award. He also captained the United States national team during the 2023 World Baseball Classic and was named to the All-WBC Team. He is regarded by many as the best baseball player of his generation and one of the greatest players in baseball history.

The Angels selected Trout in the first round of the 2009 MLB draft. He made a brief major league appearance in 2011 before becoming a regular player for the Angels the subsequent season and won the 2012 AL Rookie of the Year Award unanimously. Trout's athleticism on the field has received praise from both the mainstream media and sabermetricians. Trout led the American League in wins above replacement (WAR) in each of his first five full seasons, and is the active leader in the stat with 91.7 bWAR.

Trout has led the American League in runs (2012–14, 2016) and times on base (2013, 2015–16, 2018) four times. In 2019, he signed a 12-year, $426 million contract with the Angels, one of the richest contracts ever in professional sports and the second-biggest contract at the time of signing.

== Early life ==
Michael Nelson Trout was born on August 7, 1991, in Vineland, New Jersey, to Jeff and Debbie (née Busonick) Trout. He grew up in nearby Millville, New Jersey. He has two older siblings, sister Teal and brother Tyler. His father, Jeff (born January 7, 1961), played baseball at the University of Delaware and was a fifth-round draft pick as a second baseman by the Minnesota Twins in 1983. Jeff played four years of minor league baseball before a torn plantar fascia and knee injuries ended his career. Trout grew up a die-hard Philadelphia Phillies fan and attended their World Series parade in 2008.

Trout began playing baseball in Cal Ripken Baseball, a division of Babe Ruth League. His main position as a youth baseball player was shortstop. He wore #2 in honor of his childhood hero, New York Yankees shortstop Derek Jeter. He would switch to #1 in high school. Mike attended Lakeside Middle School and is a 2009 graduate of Millville Senior High School.

Trout attended Millville Senior High School in Millville, New Jersey, where he played both baseball and basketball, earning five letters (three in baseball and two in basketball). In his junior year, he threw a no-hitter against Egg Harbor Township High School. The Thunderbolts made it to the state playoffs and were defeated by Cherry Hill High School East. He started as a pitcher and shortstop and was shifted to the outfield during his senior year. That year, he hit 18 home runs, a New Jersey high school record. Trout had committed to play baseball at East Carolina University before the 2009 MLB draft. Millville initially planned to retire Trout's jersey number but instead began awarding it to the team captain, starting in 2012.

Trout played travel ball with Tri-State Arsenal, one of the premier travel programs in the Northeast. He began working with the coaches at Arsenal at age 14. Trout played in various tournaments with Tri-State Arsenal, including the Perfect Game WWBA Championships in Jupiter, Florida, in 2007 and 2008.

In the summer before his senior year, Trout attended the Area Code Games in southern California, where he went 6 for 11 against some of the best players in the country. Angels scout Greg Morhardt, who had played in the minor leagues with Trout's father, claimed Mike was the fastest and strongest 17-year-old he had ever seen.

== Professional career ==
=== Draft and minor leagues ===
The Angels selected Trout, using their compensation pick from the New York Yankees for their signing of Mark Teixeira, 25th overall in the 2009 MLB draft. He signed a contract including a $1.215 million bonus with the Angels on July 2, 2009, foregoing his commitment to play college baseball at East Carolina. He started his professional career out of high school in 2009 playing for the Arizona Angels of the rookie-level Arizona League (AZL), hitting .360 with a .418 OBP and .506 SLG with one home run, 25 runs batted in (RBIs), and 13 stolen bases in 187 plate appearances over 39 games. He was beaten out in being named AZL Most Valuable Player by Cody Decker. He finished the season playing for the Cedar Rapids Kernels of the Class A Midwest League, hitting .267 over 20 plate appearances in five games.

Before the 2010 season, Trout was considered the Angels' third-best prospect and the 85th-best in all of baseball by Baseball America. He started the season playing for Cedar Rapids, where he hit .362 with a .454 on-base percentage (OBP) and a .526 slugging percentage (SLG) with six home runs, 39 RBIs, and 45 stolen bases in 82 games. He was selected to play in the All-Star Futures Game. In July, Baseball America named Trout the second-best overall baseball prospect. After the Futures game, he was promoted to the Rancho Cucamonga Quakes of the Class A-Advanced California League.

After the 2010 season, Trout received the Topps Minor League Player of the Year Award; at just 19 years and 2 months, he became the youngest player to win the award. He was also named a Baseball America All-Star as well as a Topps Class A All-Star.

Prior to the 2011 season, Trout was ranked number one by ESPN's Keith Law in his 2011 top 100 prospects list and by MLB's Jonathan Mayo. Trout started the 2011 season with the Arkansas Travelers of the Class AA Texas League. He hit .324 with nine home runs, 27 RBIs, and 28 stolen bases in his first 75 games.

=== Los Angeles Angels of Anaheim / Los Angeles Angels (2011–present) ===
==== 2011 ====
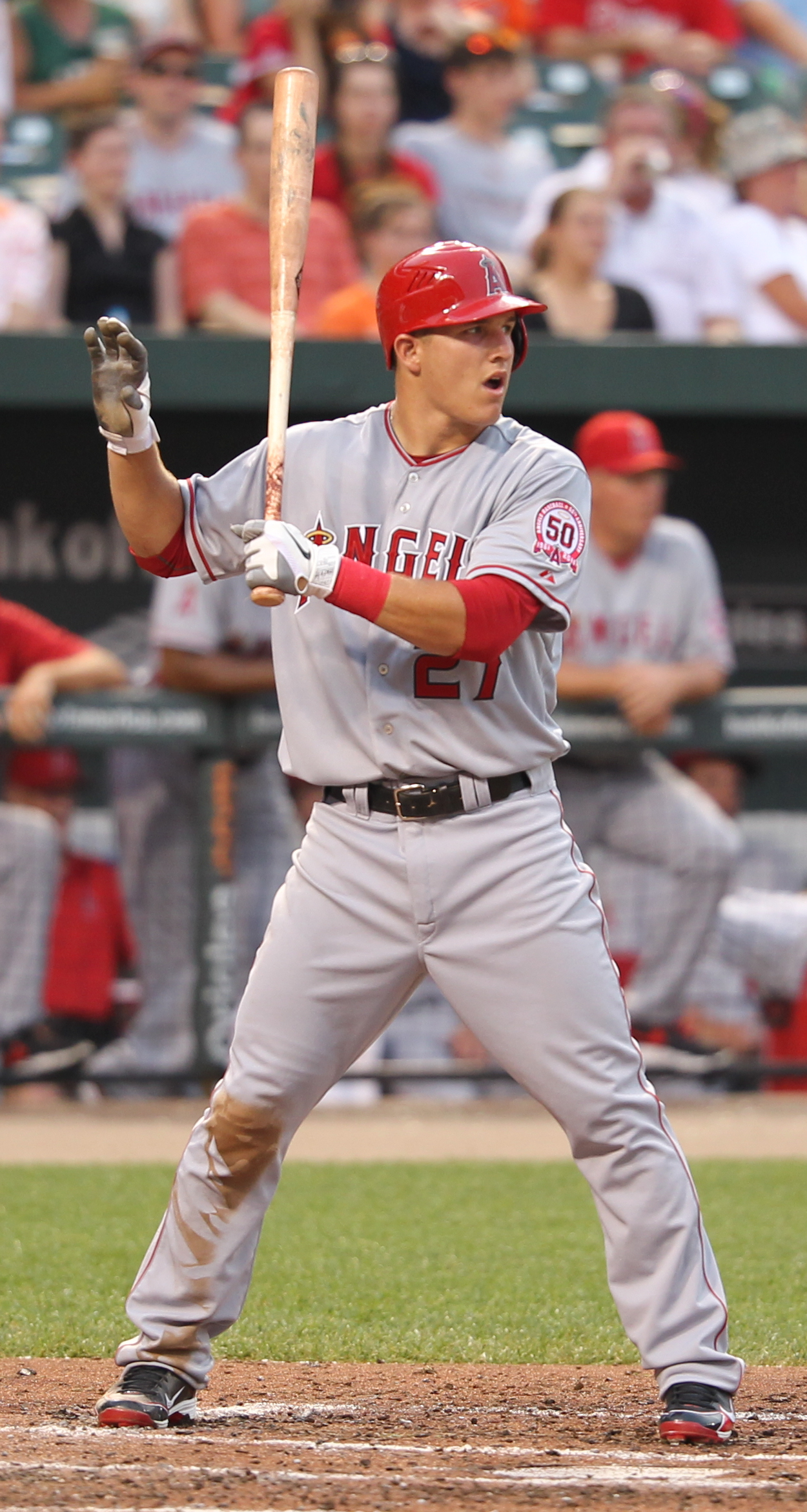
Trout with the Angels in 2011

The Los Angeles Angels promoted Trout on July 8, 2011, to replace the injured Peter Bourjos in center field. He made his major league debut that night, going 0-for-3. In his next game, Trout recorded his first career major league hit, an infield single against Seattle Mariners pitcher Michael Pineda in the bottom of the third inning. He hit his first major league home run against Baltimore Orioles pitcher Mark Worrell on July 24. Trout was sent back to Double-A Arkansas on August 1, 2011, after hitting .163 with one home run and six runs batted in 12 starts for the Angels.

After spending time back in Double-A Arkansas, Trout was recalled by the Angels on August 19, 2011. That night, he went 1-for-4 with a home run, his first at Angel Stadium. On August 30, Trout became the youngest Angel to hit two home runs in one game, homering off Mariners pitcher Anthony Vasquez in the top of the second inning and again in the top of the fourth inning. In his 40-game rookie big league stint in 2011, Trout's batting average was .220, while his on-base percentage was .281 and his slugging percentage .390.

For the 2011 season, of the 13 votes cast for the USA Today Minor League Player of the Year Award, Trout received the two votes allocated to the fan poll. He was named Baseball America Minor League Player of the Year after hitting .326/.414/.544 with 11 home runs, 38 RBIs, 82 runs scored, and 33 stolen bases in 91 games. He was again named an outfielder on Baseball America's 2011 Minor League All-Star team.

==== American League Rookie of the Year (2012) ====
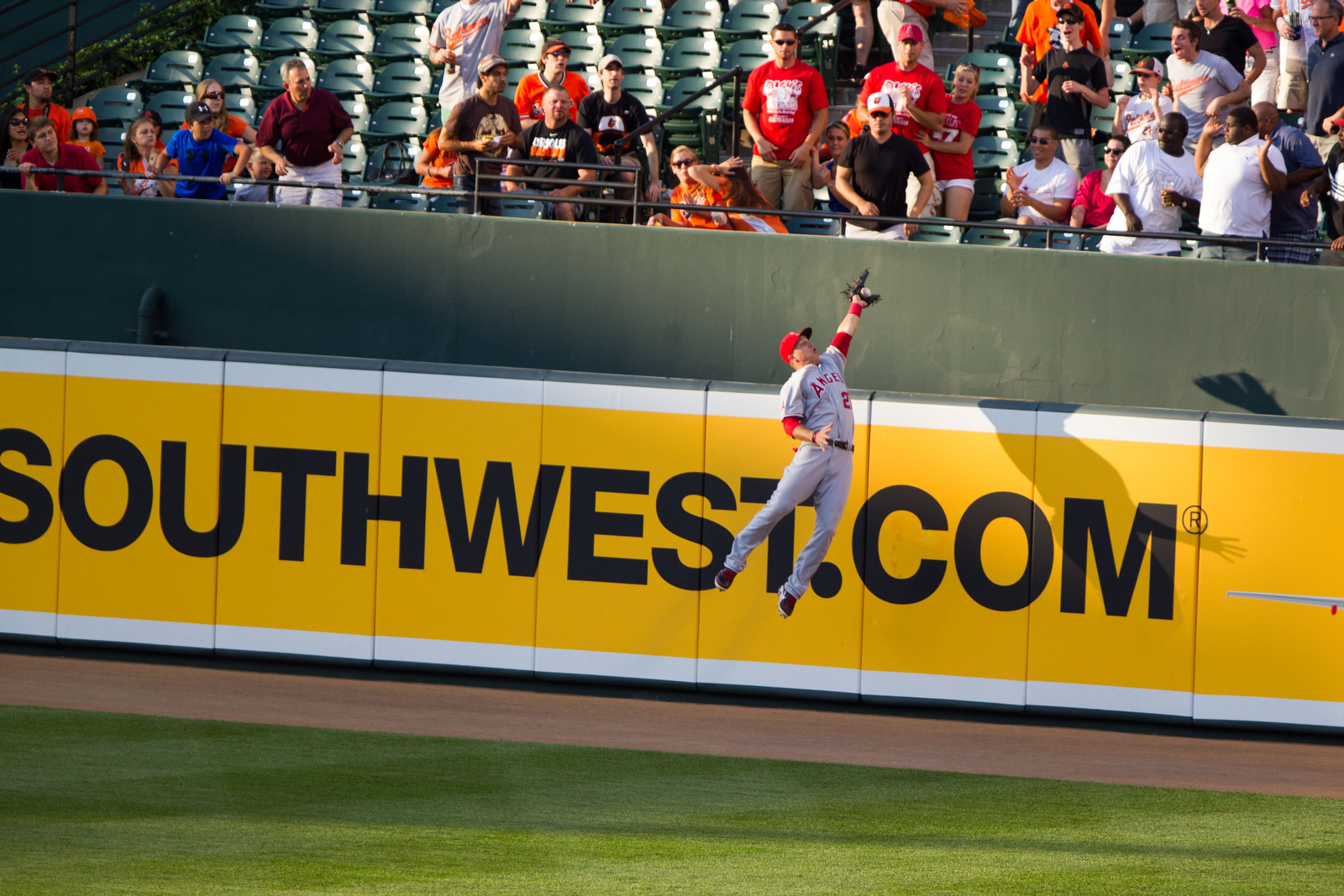
Trout robs J. J. Hardy of a home run, June 27, 2012.

Trout began the 2012 season with the Salt Lake Bees of the Triple-A Pacific Coast League. On April 28, he was again brought up from the minors, this time to replace Bobby Abreu (who was batting .208 in 24 at-bats). At that time, Trout had a .403 batting average, a .467 on-base percentage, and a .623 slugging percentage in 20 games with Salt Lake.

Trout recorded his first career four-hit game on June 4 (and his second 15 days later). In the process, he scored all four times and two of his four hits went for doubles. Trout, along with Angels right fielder Torii Hunter, was named American League co-Player of the Week for June 4–10. During that stretch, Trout went 13-for-25 for a .520 batting average to go along with 10 runs scored and four stolen bases. On June 27 against the Baltimore Orioles, Trout had his third career four-hit game in the same month. In the same game, he showed off his defensive skills when he robbed Orioles shortstop J. J. Hardy of a home run as he leaped up in the center-field wall to make a spectacular catch in the bottom of the first inning.

Trout broke both an Angels' franchise and American League rookie record when he crossed home plate in 14 consecutive games after scoring a run in a game on July 22. Trout's 26 stolen bases tied Jerry Remy for the team's rookie record for most stolen bases by the All-Star Break. Playing in his first All-Star Game, Trout singled off of New York Mets pitcher R. A. Dickey in the bottom of the 6th inning and drew a base on balls against Cincinnati Reds pitcher Aroldis Chapman in the bottom of the 7th. In the month of June, Trout batted .372 with three home runs and 16 RBI and was named AL Player of the Month and AL Rookie of the Month. Angels manager Mike Scioscia explained Trout's impact by saying, "It's a pleasant surprise only with the fact that you see very few guys come up and do this much. Is it surprising that Mike Trout's talent is able to produce what's happening on the field? No, that's not a surprise. He's an extraordinary talent." Trout's 34 runs scored in July tied the Major League rookie record with Cleveland Indians first baseman Hal Trosky in 1934. He had a .392 batting average, 10 home runs, and 23 runs batted in. In addition, Trout continued to show his speed by stealing nine bases and scoring 32 runs in July. Trout also became the first rookie to drive in at least 55 runs and score 80 runs in 81 games since Joe DiMaggio in 1936."

Against the Chicago White Sox on August 4, Trout made another highlight catch, robbing second baseman Gordon Beckham of a home run in the second inning. White Sox catcher A. J. Pierzynski told reporters after the game that Trout "makes those catches in the outfield look so good.".

On August 21, Trout went 2-for-4 in a victory over the Boston Red Sox, raising his batting average to .344. With the .344 average, Trout set the rookie record for batting average through 100 games. Trout finished the month of August with a .284 batting average, seven home runs, 19 runs batted in, 11 stolen bases, and a .866 OPS. Trout was again named AL Rookie of the Month for August, his fourth time winning the honor. In winning the award for the fourth time, Trout became the first American League rookie since Ichiro Suzuki in 2001 to win Rookie of the Month four times during a single season.

Trout became the youngest player ever to hit at least 20 home runs and steal at least 40 bases in a season. Houston Astros center fielder César Cedeño had been the youngest player to accomplish the feat, doing so in 1972. He also became the youngest hitter ever to hit at least 20 home runs and steal at least 30 bases in a season. Trout scored his 100th run of the season on August 26, becoming the second Angels rookie to score at least 100 runs in a season after Devon White. Trout set a new Angels record for runs scored in a rookie season, passing White. Trout scored three runs that day, the tenth time in the 2012 season that he scored three or more runs in one game, the most since Sammy Sosa's 11 games in 2001.

On September 9, in a game against the Detroit Tigers, Trout became the first player in baseball history under the age of 22 to hit a leadoff home run in back-to-back games. On September 21, Trout became the first rookie to score 120 or more runs since Ichiro Suzuki and the fourth rookie to accomplish that feat since 1964. On September 30, Trout became the youngest player in Major League Baseball history to join the 30–30 club when he belted a 7th-inning home run off of Texas Rangers pitcher Yu Darvish, helping the Angels win the game by a score of 5–4.

Trout became the first player in MLB history to hit 30 home runs, steal 45 bases, and score 125 runs in one season. Trout set the Angels' club record for most runs scored in a season, surpassing Vladimir Guerrero. He also set the Angels rookie record for most hits in a season with 173, passing Wally Joyner. Trout became the first rookie ever to hit 30 home runs and steal 40 bases in the same season. In addition, Trout finished second in the AL in batting average (.326), third in slugging percentage (.564), third in on-base percentage (.399), second in OPS (.963), 9th in hits (182), and first in OPS+ (171). He became the first Angels player to lead the league in stolen bases since Chone Figgins did so in 2005 with 49 stolen bases. He led the American League in power-speed number (37.2). According to Baseball-Reference.com, Trout finished with a wins above replacement (WAR) value of 10.9, 2.4 better than second-place finisher Robinson Canó of the Yankees. Trout was the first position player to have a WAR above 10 since Barry Bonds for the San Francisco Giants in 2004.

Trout led the Angels in batting average, runs scored, hits (182), triples, stolen bases, total bases (315), base on balls, on-base percentage, slugging percentage, and on-base plus slugging despite playing in just 139 games. He was tied with Albert Pujols for second place on the team in home runs behind Mark Trumbo and was fourth in runs batted in.

On November 12, 2012, Trout won the Rookie of the Year Award, receiving all 28 first-place votes, becoming the first Angels player to win the award since Tim Salmon won it in 1993 and the youngest player to win the AL Rookie of the Year Award. Trout became just the 18th Rookie of the Year winner to win the award unanimously. On November 13, Trout won the Heart and Hustle Award, given to the player who "demonstrates a passion for the game of baseball and best embodies the values, spirit and traditions of the game.” Trout was one of three outfielders in the American League to win the Silver Slugger for being the best offensive players at their position; the others were then-Ranger Josh Hamilton and Josh Willingham of the Minnesota Twins. He also won a Fielding Bible Award as the best fielding center fielder in MLB.

Trout's high WAR value led many to support his candidacy for American League Most Valuable Player. Trout's main competition for the award was Miguel Cabrera, who became the first player since Carl Yastrzemski in 1967 to win the triple crown, leading the AL in batting average, home runs, and runs batted in. The race between Trout and Cabrera created controversy amongst baseball fans and writers, and was described by many as a clash between new-age sabermetrics and supporters of more "traditional" statistics. In supporting Trout's case, Jayson Stark wrote, "We just understand that Trout's insane 10.5 WAR are one more clear indication that he's a better baseball player than even one of the greatest hitters of our lifetimes. ... If you want to toss in his slash line, his 62 extra-base hits, his 92.3 percent stolen-base success rate or any other item on his stat sheet, you'll find that no player in the history of baseball has combined this much excellence in so many areas in the same season." Meanwhile, Scott Miller of CBS Sports wrote, "Nobody combined overall statistics, badass lineup presence, and value to his team more than Triple Crown winner Miguel Cabrera." On November 15, Cabrera won the MVP decisively, winning 22 of 28 first-place votes, as Trout received the other six.

==== 2013 ====
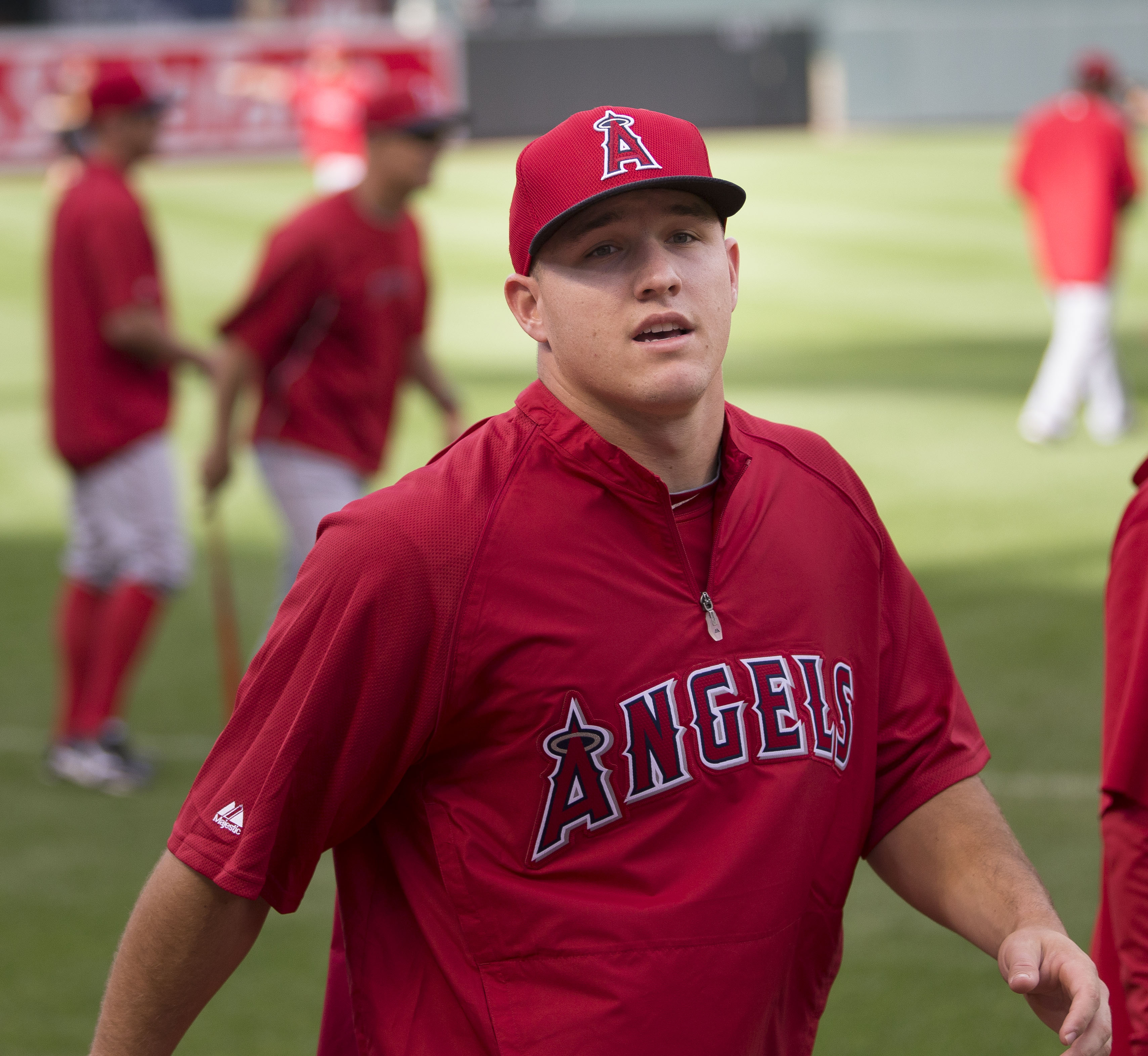
Trout in 2013

Trout began the 2013 season as a left fielder to accommodate for Peter Bourjos in center field. He started season slowly, hitting .261 with two home runs and 16 RBIs in April. During a game on April 20 against the Detroit Tigers, Trout hit his first career grand slam off pitcher Rick Porcello, capping a 10-run inning for the Angels, their highest-scoring inning in almost 18 years.

On April 30, Bourjos injured his hamstring, and Trout was moved back to center field. In May, Trout regained his rookie-year form, batting .327 with 8 home runs, 21 RBIs, and 27 runs scored. Trout stated that he had struggled early in the season because he was chasing pitches out of the strike zone and pressing too much on himself. On May 21, 2013, Trout became the youngest player to hit for the cycle in American League history and sixth youngest in Major League history, doing so at home against the Seattle Mariners. On May 30, Angels manager Mike Scioscia announced that Trout would return to left field after Bourjos returned from the disabled list. This decision caused some controversy, as some believed that Trout's successful May was a direct result of his move back to center field. Scioscia, however, believed that Trout's numbers as a center fielder had to do with his batting-order position and hype subsiding.

On June 8, with shortstop Erick Aybar struggling at the leadoff spot, Trout began batting leadoff, marking his first time hitting in the leadoff spot since April 14. In his first game batting leadoff since mid-April, Trout went 3-for-5, with two doubles, a run batted in, scored two runs, had a base on balls, and stole a base, helping the Angels win the game over the Boston Red Sox in the first game of a doubleheader.

Trout indeed moved back to left field after Bourjos returned to the Angels' lineup on June 10. In his 249th career game, he scored his 200th career run, becoming the fastest player to accomplish this since Ted Williams (225 games) and Barney McCosky (236 games) did it in 1940.

Trout represented the Angels in the 2013 Major League Baseball All-Star Game. He was the leading vote-getter among all AL outfielders and the first Angels position player to start in the All-Star Game since Vladimir Guerrero in 2007. In July, Trout led all of baseball with an on-base percentage of .475 and OPS of 1.108. In addition, he was the only player in the American League to reach base in every game of the month and became the first Angels player to have two consecutive streaks of reaching base in at least 33 games. Trout continued his strong play in August, batting .337 with 6 home runs and an on-base percentage of .500. As in 2012, Trout's play declined somewhat in September, as he batted .281 with 4 home runs and 4 stolen bases.

According to Baseball-Reference, Trout finished the 2013 season with 9.2 WAR, again the highest in baseball. Notably, Trout's walk rate increased from 10.5% in 2012 to 15.4% in 2013. Trout's 110 bases on balls led the American League. He again led the American League in power-speed number (29.7). Echoing the 2012 season, Miguel Cabrera won the 2013 AL MVP with 23 first-place votes, while Trout finished second with five.

==== First AL Most Valuable Player Award (2014) ====
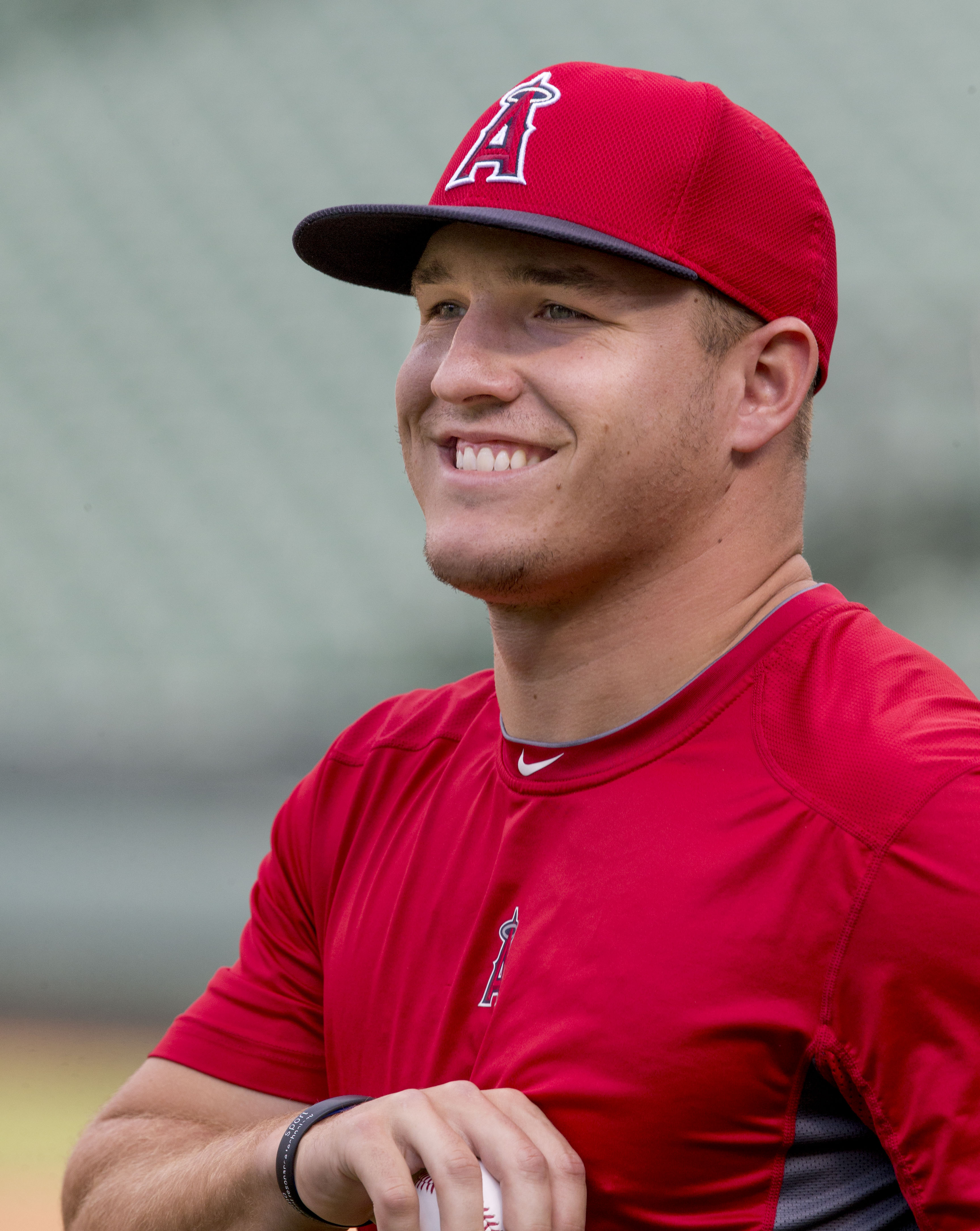
Trout in 2014

Rumors of a contract extension surfaced in February 2014, as news outlets reported that the Angels were considering offering Trout a six-year, $150 million contract. Instead, he signed a one-year, $1 million contract. That figure is the highest ever for a player not yet eligible for salary arbitration. On March 28, 2014, the Angels announced they had signed Trout to a six-year, $144.5 million extension.

On April 19, 2014, Trout went 0–4 with four consecutive strikeouts against Max Scherzer, giving him his first golden sombrero after playing in 353 games. On May 15, Trout hit his first career walk-off home run in a 6–5 victory over the Tampa Bay Rays. On July 15, Trout appeared in his third All-Star Game at Target Field in Minnesota. He went 2 for 3, with a double, a triple, and two RBIs. He was named the Most Valuable Player of the game, making him the second-youngest All-Star Game MVP behind Ken Griffey Jr. in 1992. On June 27, Trout hit the longest home run of the 2014 season, according to ESPN.com's Home Run Tracker. The ball was hit 489 feet into left-center field at Kauffman Stadium, Kansas City, Missouri.

Playing in 157 games in 2014, Trout batted .287 with 36 home runs, 39 doubles, nine triples, an AL-leading 111 RBIs, 16 stolen bases and an MLB-leading 115 runs scored. He also struck out a league-high 184 times. In an interview with Ken Rosenthal, Trout attributed his increased strikeouts to a "golf swing." Nevertheless, Trout added he was working with staff to fix and correct the strikeout tendency, and what may have been the only significant flaw of his all-around game.

In Game 3 of the 2014 American League Division Series against the Kansas City Royals, Trout hit his first career postseason home run in the first inning off of James Shields. Later on in the ninth inning, Trout was the final batter of the Angels to strike out as the team lost to the Royals in a three-game sweep of the series. As of 2025, it is his only postseason appearance.

On November 13, 2014, the Baseball Writers' Association of America announced that Trout was unanimously selected as the AL MVP, becoming the sixth player in MLB history to win both the regular-season MVP and the All-Star Game MVP in the same season. Further, at the time, he was the fifth-youngest MVP ever, the 17th to win unanimously, and the third in Angels' franchise history, following Vladimir Guerrero in 2004.

==== 2015 ====
On April 17, 2015, Trout became the youngest player in MLB history to reach 100 home runs and 100 stolen bases. He was 23 years and 253 days old when he reached the milestone, passing the previous record-holder, Alex Rodriguez, who had achieved it at the age of 23 years and 309 days in 1999. Trout led off the 2015 MLB All-Star Game with a home run, becoming the fourth player in All-Star Game history to do so. For the second year in a row, Trout won the All-Star Game MVP Award, becoming the first player ever to win it in consecutive years. On September 22, Trout hit his 40th home run, becoming only the second Angels player to hit 40 home runs in a season. Trout led the AL in WAR for the fourth straight year.

Trout finished the season with 41 home runs and 90 RBIs. He also led all American League players in slugging percentage and OPS, with a slash line of .299/.402/.590. For his offensive performance, Trout won his fourth Silver Slugger Award in as many seasons. In doing so, he became only the second player since Mike Piazza to win four straight Silver Sluggers to start off a career. He also won the Best Major League Baseball Player ESPY Award.

On November 10, it was announced that Trout, along with Royals outfielder Lorenzo Cain and Blue Jays third baseman Josh Donaldson, were finalists for the AL MVP. Trout became the first player since Barry Bonds to be among the top three in MVP voting in four straight seasons. On November 19, Trout finished second to MVP winner Donaldson, making it the third time he finished second in MVP voting in his four big-league seasons.

==== Second AL MVP (2016) ====
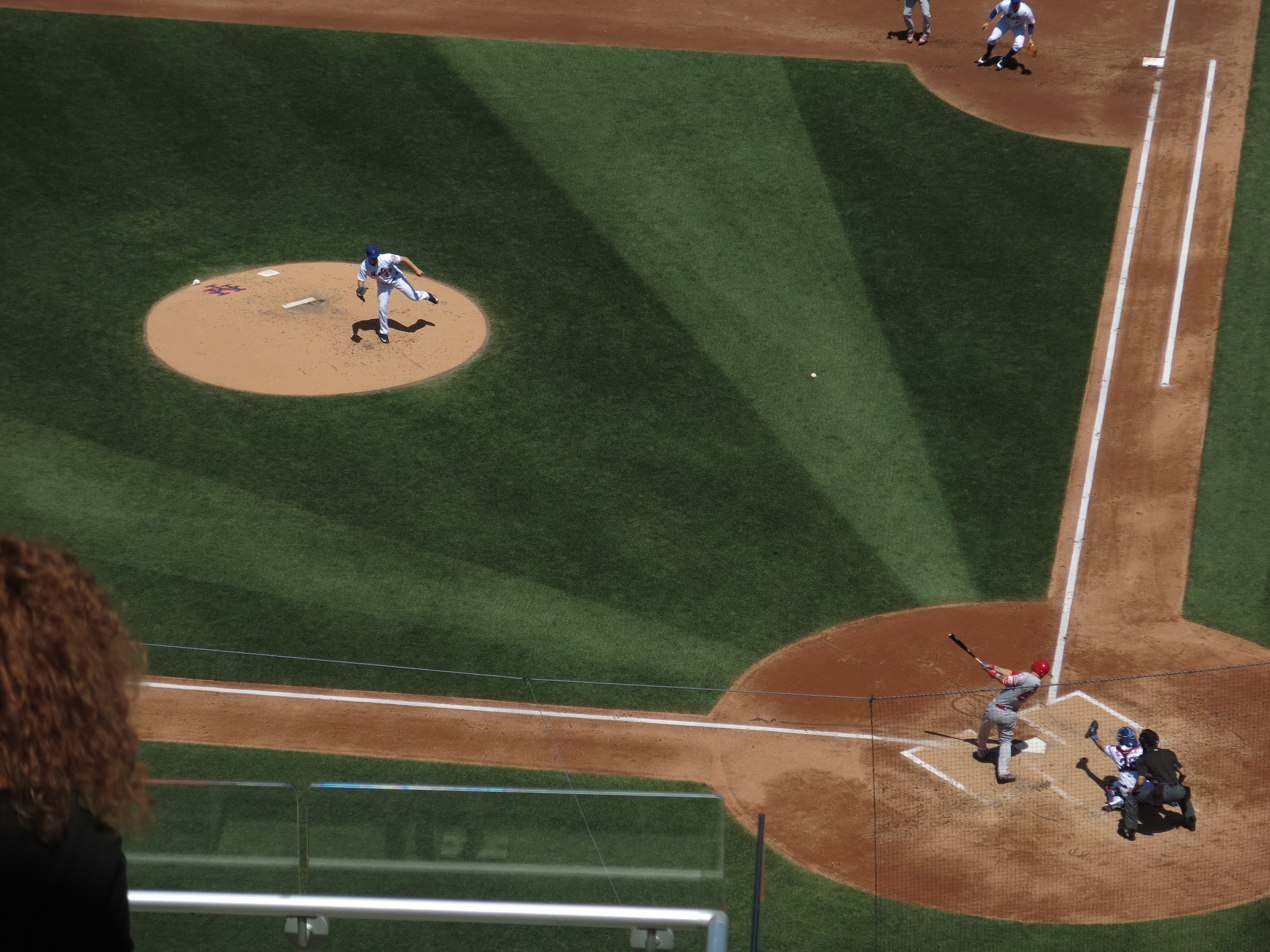
Trout hitting a home run off the Mets' Tommy Milone in an interleague game in 2017

In June 2016, Sporting News named Trout "baseball's best [active] player". According to FanGraphs, he had accumulated more WAR through his age-24 season (on August 12, 2016) than any other player since 1913, with 45. Mickey Mantle was second with 41.1, followed by Mel Ott, Jimmie Foxx, and Ted Williams. A veteran contemporary of Trout's, Alex Rodriguez, was seventh. In 159 games of 2016, Trout led MLB with walks (116), runs scored (123), and on-base percentage (.441). He also had a .315 batting average, 29 home runs, 30 stolen bases, and 100 RBI. He led the American League in power-speed number (29.5).

On November 17, Trout was announced as the 2016 AL MVP, winning the award for the second time in his career. Trout also joined Barry Bonds as the only other player in MLB history to finish top 2 for the MVP in five straight seasons. He was the 2016 Esurance MLB/This Year in Baseball Award winner for Best Major Leaguer. At the conclusion of the 2016 season, Trout was 12th among active position players in Total Wins Above Replacement through just five full seasons.

==== 2017 ====
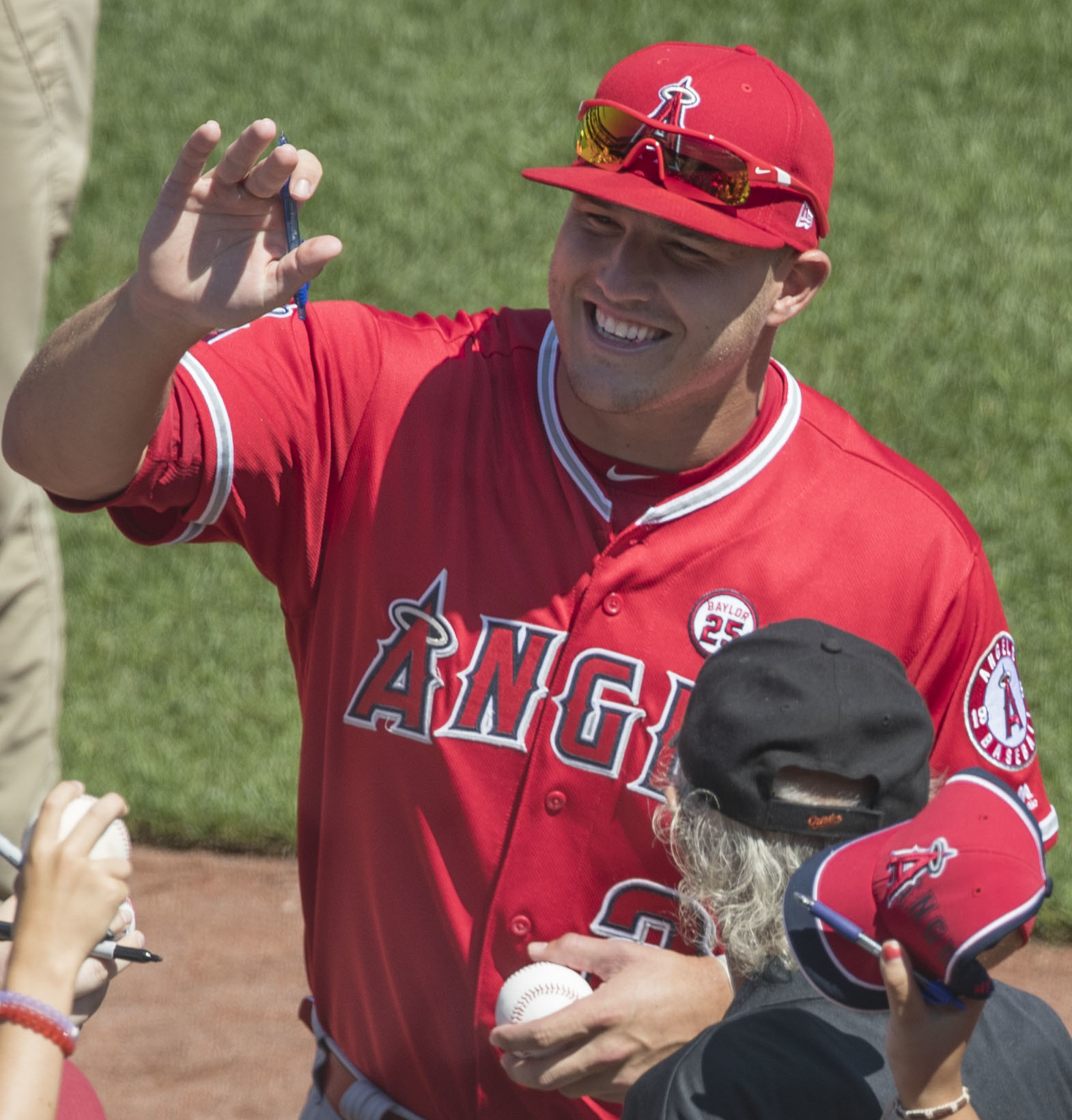
Trout in 2017

On May 28, 2017, Trout left the game after spraining his left thumb. At the time, he was batting .337 and led the Angels with 16 home runs. Two days later, an MRI revealed the injury was a torn ulnar collateral ligament, and he was placed on the disabled list for the first time in his major league career. The injury required surgery, and he was ruled out for six to eight weeks. On May 31, he underwent successful thumb surgery. He was voted to be a starting outfielder for the American League in the All-Star Game, but did not play due to his thumb injury. Trout was activated from the disabled list on July 14 after missing 39 games. On August 7, the date of his 26th birthday, he doubled down the third-base line for his 1,000th career hit. In his next at-bat, he hit a home run for his 1,001st hit. It marked the fourth time in six seasons that Trout had homered on his birthday.

On September 6, 2017, against the Oakland Athletics, Trout drew a walk in his 14th consecutive contest to pass Albie Pearson for the franchise record of 13 set in 1961. He hit his 200th career home run off of Marco Gonzales of the Seattle Mariners on September 29, 2017. Trout became the seventh player in history to reach 200 or more home runs before the end of his age-25 season, following Jimmie Foxx, Eddie Mathews, Mickey Mantle, Mel Ott, Frank Robinson, Alex Rodriguez, and Albert Pujols. Trout played in a career low 114 games due to injury but led the team in runs (92), home runs (33), stolen bases (22), walks (94), and in batting average (.306).

End of season awards for Trout included selection as center fielder on Baseball America's All-MLB Team.

==== 2018 ====
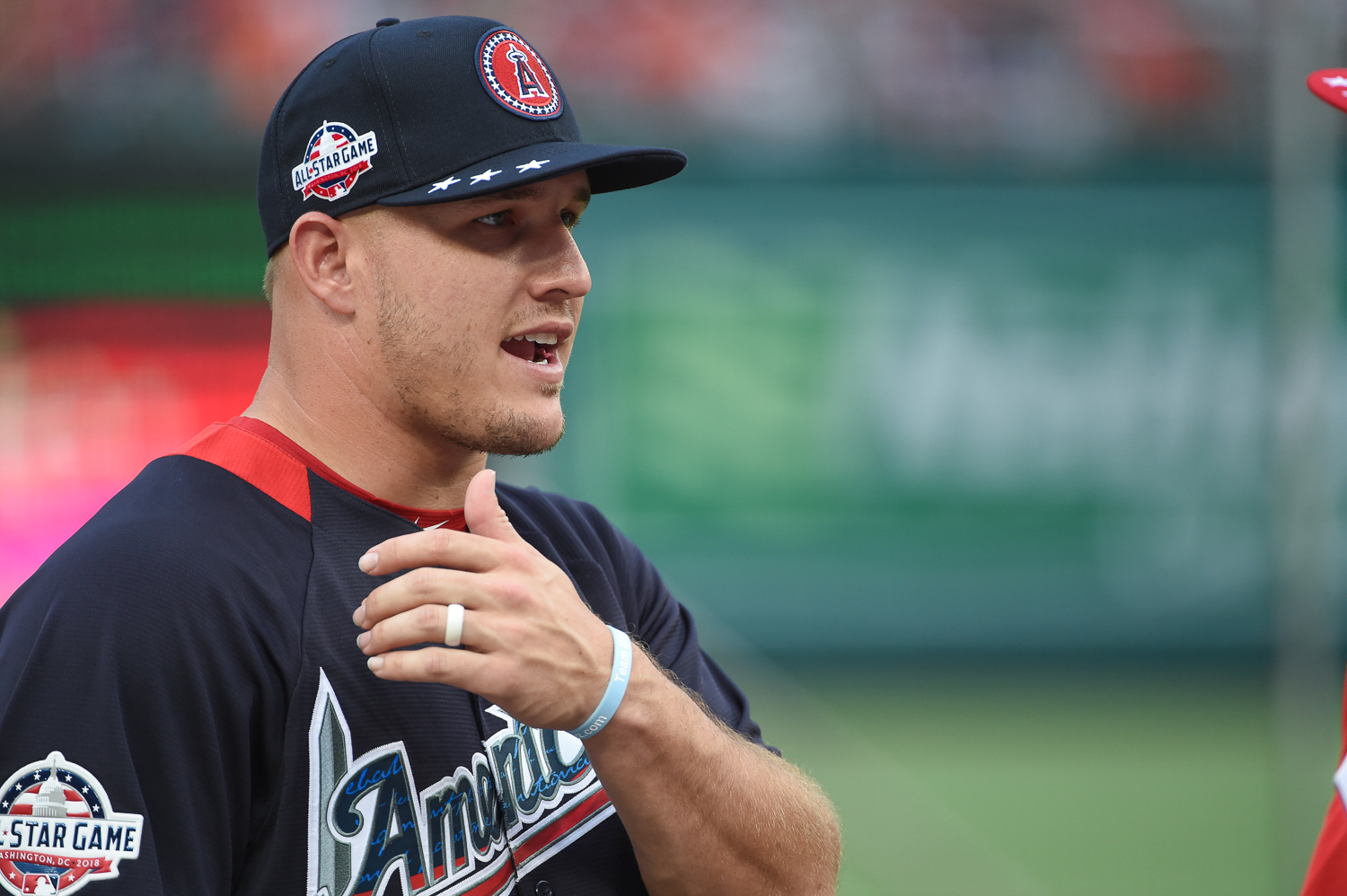
Trout at Nationals Park before the 2018 Major League Baseball All-Star Game

Prior to the 2018 season, Sports Illustrated rated Trout the #1 player in baseball. He achieved his first career five-hit game on May 26 at Yankee Stadium, going 5-for-5 with three doubles and a home run. He also set single-game career highs in doubles, extra-base hits (four), and total bases (11). Previously, he had collected four hits in a game 13 times. The Angels defeated New York 11–4. He homered twice in each of consecutive games against the Seattle Mariners on June 11 and 12, doing so for the first time in his career, while totaling a then MLB leading 23 home runs. In a span of eight games through June 19, he reached base in 29 of 37 plate appearances to bat .696/.778/1.261 with a 2.039 OPS.

Batting .312 with 25 home runs and 50 RBIs, Trout was named a starting outfielder for the 2018 MLB All-Star Game. He went 1–2 with a home run and a walk. On August 10, 2018, Trout was placed on the disabled list due to right wrist inflammation.

For the season, he batted .312 (4th in the league)/.460 (leading the league)/.628 (3rd), with 101 runs scored (9th), 39 home runs (4th), 79 RBIs, 24 stolen bases (9th), a 92.31 stolen base percentage (2nd), 12.1 at bats per home run (2nd), and a 29.7 power-speed number (4th). He walked in 20.1% of his at bats, tops in the major leagues, led the American League with 122 walks, and led the majors with 25 intentional walks. He had the highest ISO (Isolated Power) of all MLB players in 2018, at .316. On defense, he led AL outfielders with a 1.000 fielding percentage.

==== Third AL MVP (2019) ====
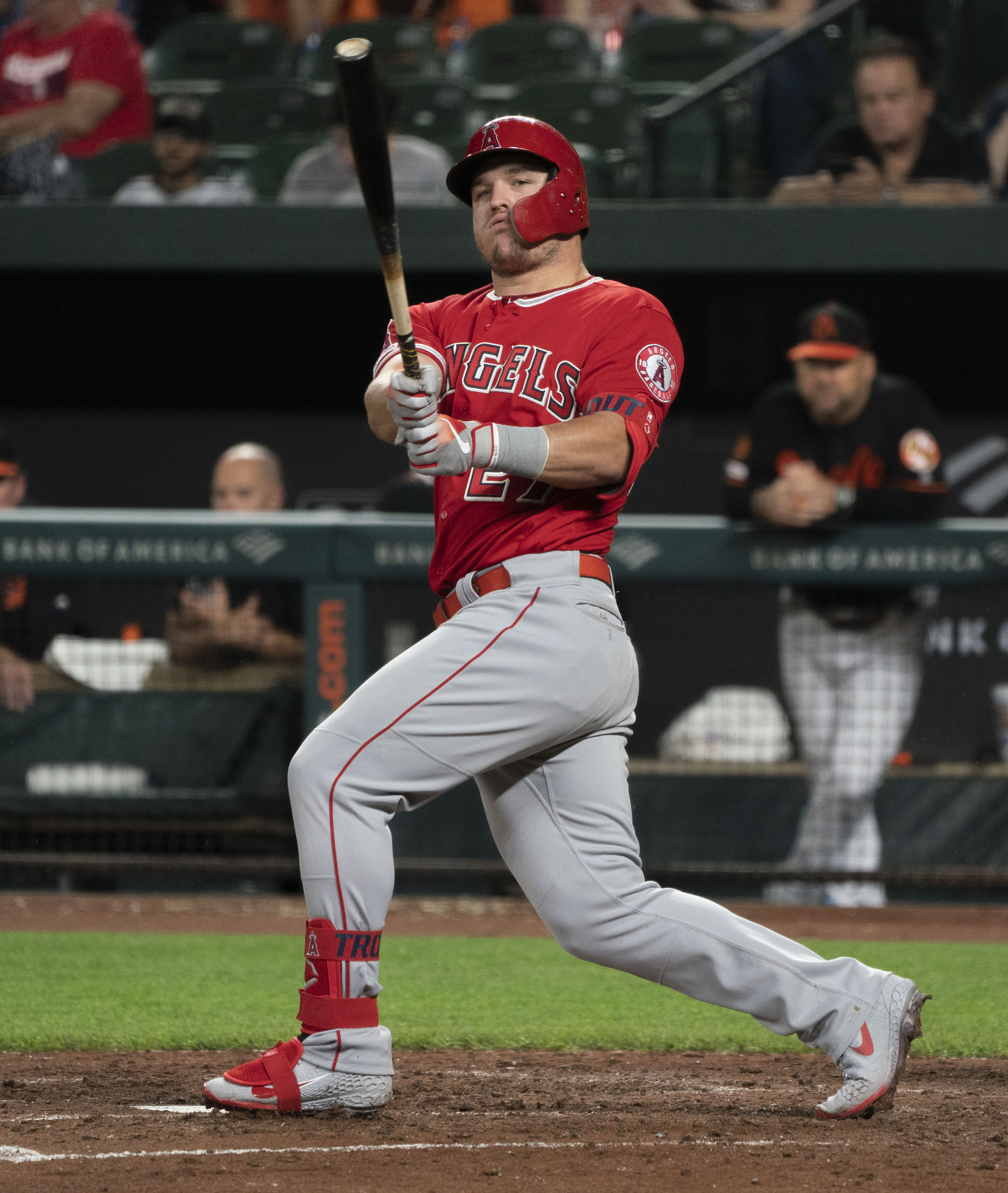
Trout during a game against the Orioles in May 2019

On March 20, 2019, Trout signed a 12-year, $426 million contract with the Angels, at the time, the richest contract in the history of North American sports but was later surpassed by Patrick Mahomes' 10-year $503 million contract with the Kansas City Chiefs on July 6, 2020.

Following the April home series against the Texas Rangers, Trout was named AL Player of the Week for the fourth time in his career. Trout went on to make his eighth straight All-Star Game. During the game, he honored his late teammate and friend Tyler Skaggs by wearing his number 45. Trout surpassed Barry Bonds to become the youngest player to join the 200 home run, 200 stolen base club when he stole his 200th career base on August 31.

On September 9, Trout underwent a cryoablation procedure to address a neuroma in his right foot. On September 15, it was announced that Trout would undergo full-fledged surgery to remove the neuroma, ending his 2019 season. He finished the season with a career-high 45 home runs and led the American League in on-base percentage and slugging percentage.

On October 24, 2019, he won the AL Hank Aaron Award. Trout was also named the AL MVP for his third time in his career. With his latest win, Trout joined teammate Albert Pujols as the only active MLB players to have three MVP awards.

==== 2020 ====
On September 5, 2020, Trout hit his 300th career home run off of Brandon Bielak of the Houston Astros, breaking the Angels' all-time home run record held by Tim Salmon. He finished the pandemic-shortened season hitting .281/.390/.603 with 17 home runs (tied for 4th in the AL) and 46 RBIs (6th) in 53 games.

==== 2021 ====
For the season, Trout was hitting .333/.466/.624 with 8 home runs. On May 17, 2021, during a game against the Cleveland Indians, he appeared to strain his right calf while jogging the bases. He was placed on the 10-day injured list the following day and was expected to miss six to eight weeks. On June 28, Trout was transferred to the 60-day injured list. It was revealed in an interview with Trout in August that he had torn his calf muscle. On September 25, Trout confirmed that he would be shut down for the rest of the season.

==== 2022 ====
On March 13, 2022, Angels manager Joe Maddon said that the team was considering moving Trout out of center field to prevent injuries. In the hypothetical move, Trout would go to a corner outfield spot while former top prospect Brandon Marsh would patrol center field as he did during Trout's injured list stint in 2021. Trout said that he was surprised when he learned of the potential change via Twitter. After Trout talked with the team and stated that he preferred to play in center field, Maddon decided the following day that there would be no positional switch.

Trout batted second on Opening Day, taking the field for the first time since May 17, 2021. He went 1-for-3 at the plate with a walk. On May 21, Trout scored the 1,000th run of his career, becoming the second player in Angels history to score 1,000 or more runs for the franchise. During a five-game series against the Seattle Mariners in June, Trout became the first player in the history of either the American or National League to hit four game-winning home runs during a series, while becoming the fifth Angels player (and his second time) to hit 5 home runs in a series.

Trout came out of a game on July 12 due to back spasms and went on the injured list after a few days. He was diagnosed with a rare back disorder called costovertebral dysfunction. Trout returned from the injured list on August 19. He finished the season batting .283/.369/.630 with 40 home runs and 80 RBIs in 119 games.

==== 2023 ====
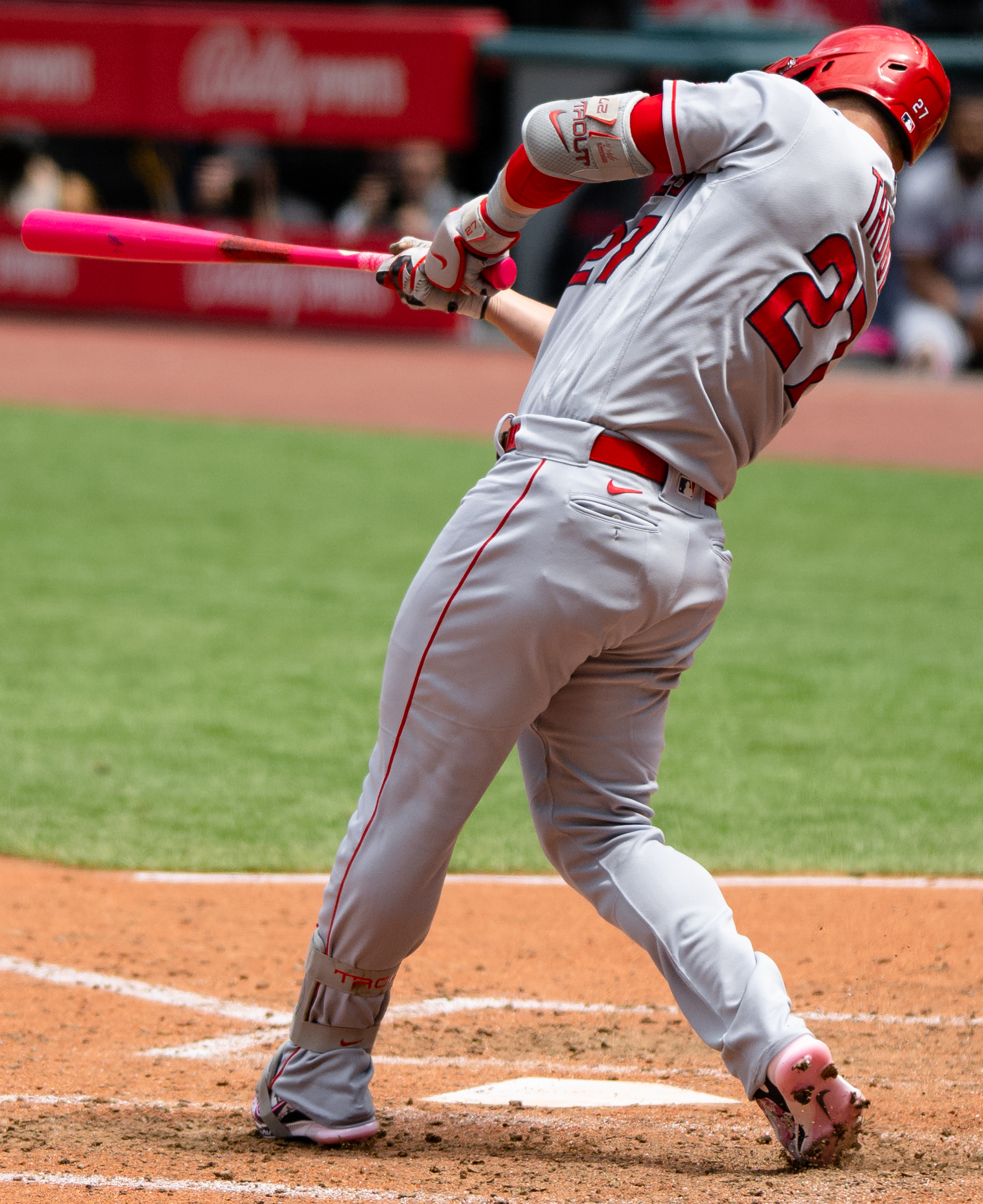
Trout batting in 2023

On April 15, 2023, Trout hit his 300th career double in a game against the Red Sox. With this, Trout became the fourth player in major league history to collect at least 300 career doubles, 300 career home runs, and 200 stolen bases by his age-31 season. He joined Barry Bonds, Alex Rodriguez, and Willie Mays. On July 4, Trout was placed on the injured list, after fracturing his left hamate bone fouling off a pitch the previous day. He was activated from the injured list on August 22, returning to the lineup that night against the Cincinnati Reds. However, he was placed back on the injured list the following day, due to lingering pain in his hand while batting. On September 24, it was announced that Trout would be shut down for the rest of 2023 season, and he was transferred to the 60-day injured list.

==== 2024 ====
On April 9, 2024, Trout hit a home run in a game against the Tampa Bay Rays, becoming the fastest player in Angels franchise history to reach six home runs, doing so in eleven games. On April 30, Trout was diagnosed with a torn meniscus, putting him on the injured list for an indefinite period of time. He underwent surgery to repair the meniscus on May 3. On July 23, Trout exited a minor league rehab game due to knee soreness. The following week, Trout announced that he had again torn the meniscus in his left knee and would be shut down for the rest of the 2024 season.

==== 2025 ====
During spring training before the 2025 season, Trout announced that he would play as a right fielder in an effort to stay healthy.

Trout left the April 30 game with a bone bruise in his left knee, going the next day on the 10-day injured list. His injury took longer than expected to heal, and he returned on May 30. On July 27, he hit a two-run homer off Seattle's Logan Gilbert for his 1,000th career RBI. On September 20, Trout hit his 400th career home run off Rockies pitcher Jaden Hill in the eighth inning. He became the 59th player to reach that milestone and the second active player to do so, joining Giancarlo Stanton. He is also the 20th player to hit all 400 HRs with one franchise. He is the third player to reach the mark with the Angels, joining Dave Winfield (Aug. 14, 1991 at Minnesota) and Vladimir Guerrero (Aug. 10, 2009 vs. Tampa Bay). On September 26, Trout hit two home runs against the Houston Astros in a 4-3 Angels victory. It was the 30th career multi-homer game for him as he set a franchise record for most multi-homer games in club history.

==== 2026 ====
Trout achieved the Angels franchise record for career extra base hits (797) with a home run against the Royals on April 26. The record had previously been held by Garret Anderson. Trout participated in the 2026 Major League Baseball All-Star Game, his first All-Star Game since 2019, after he was voted in by fans to be the American League starting center fielder. The 2026 All-Star Game was held at Citizens Bank Park in Philadelphia, Pennsylvania, less than an hour away from his hometown of Millville, New Jersey. In the game on July 14, Trout batted leadoff and went 0-for-3 in the American League's eventual 4–0 victory. On August 10 against the Texas Rangers, Trout hit a solo home run off MacKenzie Gore, giving him eleven 20-home run seasons in his career. He finished the 2026 season having played in 142 games, batting .242 with 22 home runs and 54 RBIs. Trout's performance led to him receiving a nomination for the Silver Slugger Award for the American League outfield position. His 142 games played in 2026 were the most games he played in a single season since the 2016 season.

== International career ==
On July 19, 2022, Trout announced that he would captain the United States national baseball team in the 2023 World Baseball Classic (WBC). He captained the team to the final, but ultimately lost 3–2 to Japan, with Trout being struck out by then-Angels teammate Shohei Ohtani to win the title. Trout was named to the All-WBC team.

== Awards and achievements ==
=== Awards and exhibition team selections ===
- All-Star Futures Game selection (2010)
- 3× American League Most Valuable Player (2014, 2016, 2019)
- 5× American League Player of the Month (July 2012, June 2014, July 2015, April 2017, September 2018)
- 5× American League Player of the Week (June 11, 2012; July 13, 2014; July 12, 2015; April 7, 2019)
- 4× American League Rookie of the Month (May-August 2012)
- American League Rookie of the Year (2012)
- 9× Los Angeles Angels Player of the Year (2012-2020)
- 4× Baseball America Major League Player of the Year (2012, 2013, 2016, 2018)
- 2× Baseball America Minor League Baseball All-Star Team selection (2010, 2011)
- Baseball America Minor League Player of the Year (2011)
- Baseball America Rookie of the Year Award (2012)
- 3× Baseball America Top 100 prospect (2010–12)
- 2× Baseball Digest Player of the Year (2014, 2019)
- 3× ESPY Award for Best Major League Baseball Player (2015, 2017, 2018)
- Fielding Bible Award at center field (2012)
- 2× Hank Aaron Award (2014, 2019)
- Heart & Hustle Award (2012)
- Topps All-Star Rookie Team (2012)
- Topps Minor League Player of the Year Award (2010)
- 12× Major League Baseball All-Star Game selection (2012−2019, 2021−2023, 2026)
- 2× Major League Baseball All-Star Game Most Valuable Player (2014, 2015)
- MLB.com Top 100 prospect (2012)
- Players Choice Award for Player of the Year (2019)
- 2x Players Choice Award for American League Outstanding Player (2014, 2019)
- Players Choice Award for American League Outstanding Rookie (2012)
- 9× Silver Slugger Award at outfield (2012–16, 2018–20, 2022)
- Sporting News Player of the Year Award (2019)
- Sporting News Rookie of the Year (2012)
- This Year in Baseball Award for Best Major Leaguer (2016)
- This Year in Baseball Hitter of the Year (2014)
- This Year in Baseball Award for Rookie of the Year (2012)
- Topps Minor League Baseball All-Star (2010)
- USA Today Minor League Player of the Year (2011)
- Wilson American League Defensive Player of the Year (2012)

=== Statistical achievements ===
American League statistical leader
Category	Times	Seasons
Adjusted OPS+ leader	6	2012, 2015–19
Bases on balls leader	4	2013, 2016, 2018, 2019
Extra base hits leader	2	2014, 2019
On-base percentage leader	4	2016, 2017, 2018, 2019
On-base plus slugging leader	3	2015, 2017, 2019
Runs batted in leader	2	2014, 2019
Runs scored leader	4	2012−14, 2016
Slugging percentage leader	3	2015, 2017, 2019
Stolen bases leader	1	2012
Total bases leader	2	2014, 2019
Wins above replacement leader	5	2012, 2013, 2015, 2016, 2019
Wins above replacement @ position	6	2012, 2013, 2014, 2015, 2016, 2019

== Player profile ==
"Now, despite its name, the farm bill is not just about helping farmers. Secretary [Tom] Vilsack calls it a jobs bill, an innovation bill, an infrastructure bill, a research bill, a conservation bill. It's like a Swiss Army Knife. It's like Mike Trout, for those of you who know baseball. It's somebody who's got a lot of tools and multitasks. It's creating more good jobs."

— President of the United States Barack Obama compares Agricultural Act of 2014 to Trout

Trout's exceptional performance at an early age has drawn comparisons with Hall of Famer Ted Williams, and his combination of power and speed to the skillset of Hall of Fame center fielder Mickey Mantle.

Between 2012 and 2019, Trout was first in on-base plus slugging, and was MLB's most productive batter per plate appearance when adjusted for park factors (among all batters who had 1,000 or more plate appearances). During this period, Trout combined a high average (.308, third among 464 players), high isolated power (.279, fifth) and high walk rate (15.5%, fourth).

Trout is particularly adept at hitting pitches that are low in the strike zone, but in 2015 acknowledged a vulnerability against high pitches. However, Trout later greatly improved his contact rate and slugging percentage against high fastballs.

In 2014, Trout recorded the most strikeouts ever during an MVP season, and later expressed a wish to reduce his strikeout rate. After having MLB's 14th highest strikeout rate in 2014, Trout improved to 26th in 2015, and 59th in 2016.

Trout has been graded as a roughly average defender across the outfield positions (according to ultimate zone rating) and he is also a valuable baserunner, stealing 142 bases between 2012 and 2016, at a success rate of 83 percent.

== Personal life ==
Trout married his longtime girlfriend Jessica Cox on December 9, 2017. Their sons were born on July 30, 2020 and June 30, 2024. During the baseball season, his family resides in Newport Beach, California.

Trout is a Christian. He has said, “I put everything in the Lord’s hands. I know He’s always got a plan. I know that He’s put me in this situation for a reason because I know at the end of the day, He’s in control. He’s gotten me through a lot of hard times, especially with all my injuries and everything. When the Lord’s got your hand, it’s unbelievable.”

Trout's nicknames include "Prince Fish", "God's Gift", "Millville Meteor", and "King Fish 2.0", in reference to retired Angel Tim Salmon. He adopted the nickname "Millville Meteor" after a vandal edited his Wikipedia article and the name caught on.

In February 2014, President Barack Obama used Trout as an analogy for that year's Farm Bill. To emphasize the versatility and utility of the bill, Obama remarked that it was "like Mike Trout, for those of you who know baseball...somebody who's got a lot of tools."

Trout holds season tickets for the Philadelphia Eagles of the National Football League and is friends with their former quarterback, Carson Wentz. He is also an avid supporter of the Philadelphia Flyers of the National Hockey League and the Philadelphia 76ers of the National Basketball Association.

On August 23, 2020, a Trout trading card sold for $3.93 million at auction, breaking the record for the most expensive sale price for a sports card previously held by the 1909–1911 T206 Honus Wagner baseball card. However, his record did not last long, as a Mickey Mantle 1952 Topps trading card was sold for $5.2 million in November 2020.

Outside of baseball, Trout maintains a low profile and little is known about his personal life. Some of his interests include fishing, hunting, and meteorology.

=== Endorsements ===
Trout has been a partner and investor in Bodyarmor SuperDrink, a sports drink, since 2012. In October 2012, he signed a multi-year contract with J & J Snack Foods to endorse SuperPretzel. In 2014, Nike began selling Mike Trout-branded shoes. In October 2014, Trout signed a deal with Topps giving them the exclusive right to sell his autographed baseball cards and making him the face of their digital card collection app. That deal was renewed in 2016 and, in March 2021, he was signed to the largest and longest contract the company ever signed with an individual athlete. In 2015, Trout appeared in promotional materials for a campaign to spay and neuter pit bulls conducted by the local chapter of the Society for the Prevention of Cruelty to Animals in Cumberland County, New Jersey. He has had sponsorship agreements with Subway, Rawlings, and Land Rover.

In early 2019, Trout had an estimated $2.5 million in endorsement deals.

=== Other Ventures ===
In 2026, Trout opened a private golf club called Trout National. Located in Vineland, NJ (near his hometown of Millville), it was co-designed by Trout and Tiger Woods. The club is very exclusive, with membership capped at just 227, and cost $100 million to build.

== See also ==
- Major League Baseball titles leaders
- Los Angeles Angels award winners and league leaders
- List of largest sports contracts
- List of Major League Baseball annual runs scored leaders
- List of Major League Baseball career bases on balls leaders
- List of Major League Baseball career intentional bases on balls leaders
- List of Major League Baseball career games played as a center fielder leaders
- List of Major League Baseball career OPS leaders
- List of Major League Baseball career on-base percentage leaders
- List of Major League Baseball career putouts as a center fielder leaders
- List of Major League Baseball career slugging percentage leaders
- List of Major League Baseball career strikeouts by batters leaders
- List of Major League Baseball career home run leaders
- List of Major League Baseball career runs batted in leaders
- List of Major League Baseball career runs scored leaders
- List of Major League Baseball players to hit for the cycle

Achievements
Preceded by Adrián Beltré	Hitting for the cycle May 21, 2013	Succeeded by Brandon Barnes
Awards
Preceded by José Bautista; Edwin Encarnación; Albert Pujols; Miguel Cabrera; J. D. Martinez	American League Player of the Month; July 2012; June 2014; July 2015; April 2017; September 2018	Succeeded by Miguel Cabrera; José Abreu; Edwin Encarnación; Carlos Correa; Tim Anderson
