= Power–speed number =

Baseball statistic developed by Bill James

Power–speed number or power/speed number (PSN) is a sabermetrics baseball statistic developed by baseball author and analyst Bill James which combines a player's home run and stolen base numbers into one number.

The formula is:

$PSN = \frac{2*HR*SB}{HR + SB}$.

It is the harmonic mean of the two totals.

James introduced the power–speed number in his commentary on Bobby Bonds, writing "it is so crafted that a player who does well in both home runs and stolen bases will rate high, and his rating is determined by the balance of the two as well as by the total."

== Leaders ==
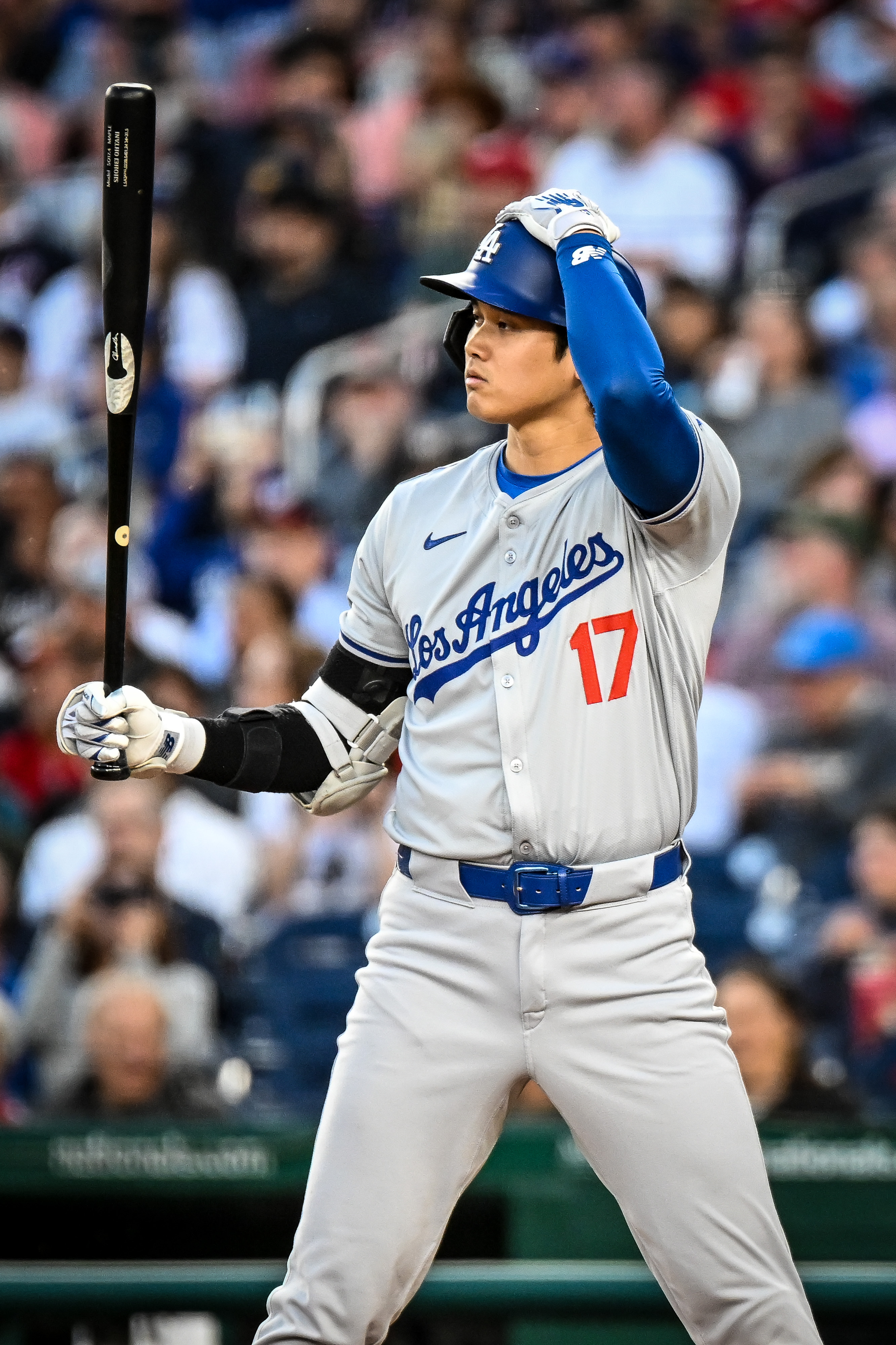
Shohei Ohtani

The highest single-season power–speed number was recorded by Shohei Ohtani of the Los Angeles Dodgers in 2024, with 54 home runs and 59 stolen bases for a power-speed number of 56.39. It was previously held by Ronald Acuña Jr. who hit 41 home runs and stole 73 bases in 2023 to record a power–speed number of 52.51.

The highest career power–speed number belongs to Barry Bonds. Bonds had 762 career home runs and 514 career stolen bases for a career power–speed number of 613.9. Rickey Henderson is second on the career list at 490.4, followed by Willie Mays (447.1), Alex Rodriguez (446.8), Barry's father Bobby Bonds (386.0), and Joe Morgan (385.9).

The highest active career power–speed numbers belong to Jose Altuve (285.78), José Ramírez (284.5), and Mike Trout (279.55), as of the end of the 2025 season.
