= Baseball Digest =

Baseball magazine

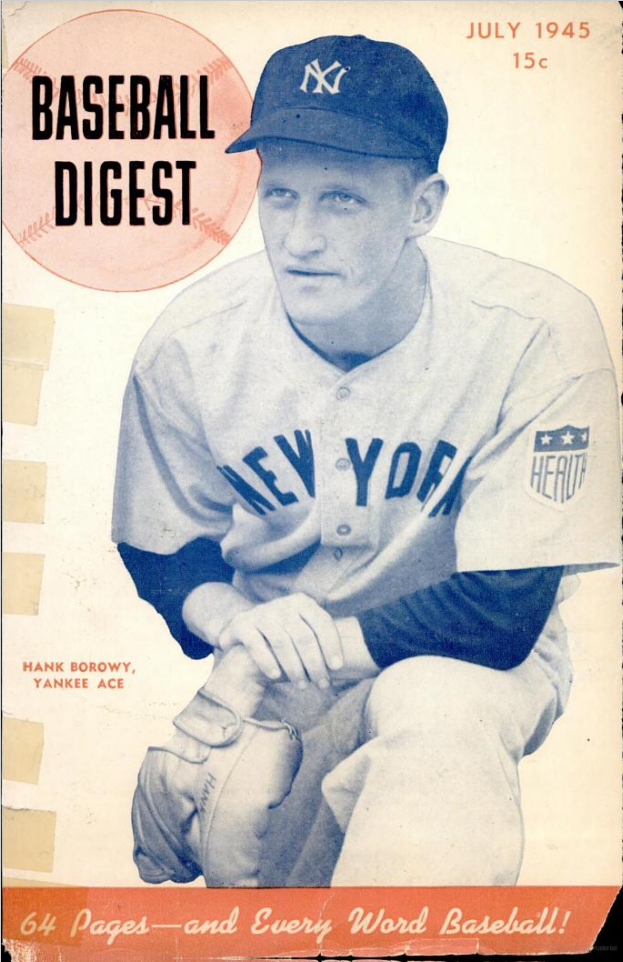
- Editor: Rick Cerrone (May 2018)
- Frequency: 6 per year
- First issue: August 1942
- Company: Grandstand Publishing, LLC
- Country: United States
- Based in: Orlando, Florida
- Language: English
- Website: baseballdigest.com
- ISSN: 0005-609X

Baseball Digest is a baseball magazine resource, published in Orlando, Florida, by Grandstand Publishing, LLC. It is the longest running baseball magazine in the United States.

== History and profile ==
The magazine was created in 1942 by Herbert F. Simons, a sportswriter for the Chicago Daily Times. Simons first published the magazine in August 1942, and served as its editor-in-chief until 1963. In 1981, Joan Whaley was published as its first female contributor.

After publishing on a 9 or 12 issue per year schedule, in 2009 the magazine was scaled back to six issues.

In March 2012, Baseball Digest merged with the professional scouting service ProScouts LLC. This relaunch included major changes to the magazine's format, as it was published in full color for the first time and was made available in more locations.

In May 2018, Rick Cerrone, former Public Relations Director with the New York Yankees (and not to be confused with the Yankees catcher of a similar name), became the fourth editor in the magazine's history. Cerrone was tasked with re-imagining the publication. Starting with the January/February 2019 issue, the magazine changed to a heavier paper stock and increased the number of pages.

On July 4, 2019, Grandstand Publishing, LLC, announced the introduction of BaseballDigestArchive.com, a web-based subscription service featuring every issue of Baseball Digest.

In May 2021, ProScouts LLC, headed by entrepreneur David Fagley, purchased the remaining outstanding shares held by long-time publisher Norman Jacobs, who remains as Publisher Emeritus.

== Baseball Digest Player of the Year ==
- 1969: Tom Seaver, New York Mets
- 1970: Billy Williams, Chicago Cubs
- 1971: Joe Torre, St. Louis Cardinals
- 1972: Dick Allen, Chicago White Sox
- 1973: Pete Rose, Cincinnati Reds
- 1974: Lou Brock, St. Louis Cardinals
- 1975: Joe Morgan, Cincinnati Reds
- 1976: Joe Morgan, Cincinnati Reds
- 1977: George Foster, Cincinnati Reds
- 1978: Ron Guidry, New York Yankees
- 1979: George Brett, Kansas City Royals
- 1980: George Brett, Kansas City Royals
- 1981: Mike Schmidt, Philadelphia Phillies
- 1982: Robin Yount, Milwaukee Brewers
- 1983: Carlton Fisk, Chicago White Sox
- 1984: Ryne Sandberg, Chicago Cubs
- 1985: Dwight Gooden, New York Mets
- 1986: Roger Clemens, Boston Red Sox
- 1987: Andre Dawson, Chicago Cubs
- 1988: José Canseco, Oakland Athletics
- 1989: Will Clark, San Francisco Giants
- 1990: Ryne Sandberg, Chicago Cubs
- 1991: Cal Ripken Jr., Baltimore Orioles
- 1992: Roberto Alomar, Toronto Blue Jays
- 1993: Barry Bonds, San Francisco Giants
- 1994: Jeff Bagwell, Houston Astros
- 1995: Albert Belle, Cleveland Indians
- 1996: Alex Rodriguez, Seattle Mariners
- 1997: Larry Walker, Colorado Rockies
- 1998: Sammy Sosa, Chicago Cubs
- 1999: Iván Rodríguez, Texas Rangers
- 2000: Todd Helton, Colorado Rockies
- 2001: Barry Bonds, San Francisco Giants
- 2002: Barry Bonds, San Francisco Giants
- 2003: Iván Rodríguez, Florida Marlins
- 2004: Vladimir Guerrero, Anaheim Angels
- 2005: Albert Pujols, St. Louis Cardinals
- 2006: Derek Jeter, New York Yankees
- 2007: Jimmy Rollins, Philadelphia Phillies
- 2008: Albert Pujols, St. Louis Cardinals
- 2009: Joe Mauer, Minnesota Twins
- 2010: Josh Hamilton, Texas Rangers
- 2011: Ryan Braun, Milwaukee Brewers
- 2012: Miguel Cabrera, Detroit Tigers
- 2013: Miguel Cabrera, Detroit Tigers
- 2014: Mike Trout, Los Angeles Angels
- 2015: Bryce Harper, Washington Nationals
- 2016: Kris Bryant, Chicago Cubs
- 2017: Jose Altuve, Houston Astros
- 2018: Mookie Betts, Boston Red Sox
- 2019: Mike Trout, Los Angeles Angels
- 2020: Freddie Freeman, Atlanta Braves
- 2021: Shohei Ohtani, Los Angeles Angels
- 2022: Aaron Judge, New York Yankees
- 2023: Ronald Acuña Jr., Atlanta Braves
- 2024: Aaron Judge, New York Yankees
- 2025: Cal Raleigh, Seattle Mariners
- 2026: Pete Crow-Armstrong, Chicago Cubs

== Baseball Digest Pitcher of the Year ==
- 1994: Greg Maddux, Atlanta Braves
- 1995: Greg Maddux, Atlanta Braves
- 1996: John Smoltz, Atlanta Braves
- 1997: Roger Clemens, Toronto Blue Jays
- 1998: Kevin Brown, San Diego Padres
- 1999: Pedro Martínez, Boston Red Sox
- 2000: Pedro Martínez, Boston Red Sox
- 2001: Curt Schilling, Arizona Diamondbacks
- 2002: Randy Johnson, Arizona Diamondbacks
- 2003: Roy Halladay, Toronto Blue Jays
- 2004: Curt Schilling, Boston Red Sox
- 2005: Dontrelle Willis, Florida Marlins
- 2006: Johan Santana, Minnesota Twins
- 2007: Josh Beckett, Boston Red Sox
- 2008: Cliff Lee, Cleveland Indians
- 2009: Zack Greinke, Kansas City Royals
- 2010: Roy Halladay, Philadelphia Phillies
- 2011: Justin Verlander, Detroit Tigers
- 2012: David Price, Tampa Bay Rays
- 2013: Max Scherzer, Detroit Tigers
- 2014: Clayton Kershaw, Los Angeles Dodgers
- 2015: Jake Arrieta, Chicago Cubs
- 2016: Jon Lester, Chicago Cubs
- 2017: Corey Kluber, Cleveland Indians
- 2018: Jacob deGrom, New York Mets
- 2019: Justin Verlander, Houston Astros
- 2020: Shane Bieber, Cleveland Indians
- 2021: Max Scherzer, Los Angeles Dodgers
- 2022: Sandy Alcántara, Miami Marlins
- 2023: Gerrit Cole, New York Yankees
- 2024: Tarik Skubal, Detroit Tigers
- 2025: Paul Skenes, Pittsburgh Pirates
- 2026: Jacob Misiorowski, Milwaukee Brewers

== Baseball Digest Lifetime Achievement Award ==
- 2021: Willie Mays
- 2022: Vin Scully
- 2023: Joe Torre
- 2024: Dusty Baker
- 2025: Bob Costas
- 2026: Sandy Koufax

== See also ==
- Baseball awards (Other individual awards)
