= This Year in Baseball Awards =

Annual awards run by Major League Baseball (2002 to 2017)

The This Year in Baseball Awards, most recently called the "Esurance MLB Awards," were a series of annual awards presented by Major League Baseball (MLB) from 2002 to 2017. They were honors given annually to the most extraordinary baseball performances, players, managers, and executives, as voted on by fans, media, team front-office personnel, former players, and the Society for American Baseball Research (SABR). Unlike MLB's other awards—which are given to one player in each of the two leagues—the MLB Awards are given to only one player in all of MLB.

In 2010, MLB began referring to the awards as the "GIBBY Awards." (GIBBY is a backronym for Greatness in BaseBall Yearly.)

In 2015, the awards were renamed by MLB as the "Esurance MLB Awards." The winners continued to receive a GIBBY trophy. Several new awards were added, including some that are based on social media.

The awards were last issued in 2017.

== System ==
Each winner is selected by a vote of fans, MLB alumni, each team's front-office personnel, members of the media, and SABR. Fans cast their votes via the online-voting system on MLB.com, the official website of MLB. More than 13 million fans voted in 2010.

In the first year, there were six categories of awards: Player of the Year, Pitcher of the Year (including starters and closers, but not setup men), Setup Man of the Year, Defensive Player of the Year, Play of the Year, and Blooper of the Year.

In 2003, three new awards were added (for a total of 9): Rookie of the Year, Manager of the Year, and Individual Performance of the Year. The Blooper of the Year was renamed Bizarre Play of the Year.

In 2004, one category was divided into two (for a total of 10): Starting Pitcher of the Year and Closer of the Year (from Pitcher of the Year). Two categories were renamed: Hitter of the Year (formerly Player of the Year) and Blooper of the Year (its original name, instead of Bizarre Play of the Year).

In 2007, two new categories were added (for a total of 12): Moment of the Year and Postseason Moment of the Year.

In 2008, a 13th category was added: Executive of the Year. The Blooper of the Year was renamed Oddity of the Year. The Performance of the Year was renamed Single-Game Performance of the Year.

In 2009, a 14th category was added: Unsung Star of the Year. The Single-Game Performance of the Year was changed back to Performance of the Year.

In 2010, the name of the awards was changed to the "GIBBY Awards," for "Greatness in Baseball Yearly." Five new categories were added, for a total of 19: Breakout Player of the Year, Dependable Player of the Year, Postseason MVP, Game of the Year, and Fan Moment of the Year. Two categories were renamed: Player of the Year (its original name, instead of Hitter of the Year) and X-Factor Player of the Year (formerly Unsung Star of the Year).

In 2011, a new category was added: Comeback Player of the Year. One category was dropped: Dependable Player of the Year. Two categories were renamed: Wow Factor of the Year (formerly X-Factor Player of the Year) and Walk-Off of the Year (formerly Game of the Year).

In 2012, two new categories were added: MLB MVP and Storyline of the Year. Two categories were dropped: Wow Factor of the Year and Moment of the Year. Two categories were divided into four (for a total of 21): Breakout Hitter and Breakout Pitcher (from Breakout Player of the Year) and Hitting Performance and Pitching Performance (from Performance of the Year). Two categories were renamed: Hitter of the Year (its former name—from 2004 to 2009—instead of its original name, Player of the Year—in 2002, 2003, 2010, and 2011) and Cut4 (formerly Fan Moment of the Year).

In 2013, two categories were added (for a total of 23): Moment of the Year (first added in 2007 but dropped in 2012) and Lifetime Achievement.

In 2014, the name of every award—except two (Most Valuable Major Leaguer and Postseason MVP)—was changed from "of the Year" to "Best," as in "Best Rookie." One category was added: Best Outfield Throw. One category was dropped: Lifetime Achievement. Another category (Postseason Moment of the Year) was replaced by three new categories (for a total of 25): Best Postseason Play, Best Postseason Walk-Off, and Best Postseason Storyline. Four categories were renamed: Most Valuable Major Leaguer (formerly MLB MVP), Best Everyday Player (formerly Hitter of the Year), Best Breakout Everyday Player (formerly Breakout Hitter of the Year), and Best Bounceback Player (formerly Comeback Player of the Year).

In 2015, the name of the awards was again changed, to the "Esurance MLB Awards," with each winner still receiving a GIBBY trophy. Eight categories were added: Social Media Personality, Social Media Post, Celebrity Fan, MLB Interview, Call (TV), Call (Radio), Video Board Moment, and Trending Topic. Nine categories were dropped: Closer, Setup Man, Outfield Throw, Storyline, Oddity, Walk-Off, Postseason Play, Postseason Walk-Off, and Postseason Storyline. Two categories were divided into four: Play (Offense) and Play (Defense) (from Play) and Fan Catch and Player–Fan Interaction (from Cut4 Topic, which was formerly Fan Moment). Four categories were consolidated into two (for a total of 24): Breakout Player (from Breakout Everyday Player and Breakout Pitcher) and Performance (from Hitting Performance and Pitching Performance). Two categories were renamed: Best Major Leaguer (formerly Most Valuable Major Leaguer) and Best Major Leaguer, Postseason (formerly Postseason MVP).

In 2016, five categories were dropped: Breakout Player, Bounceback Player, Celebrity Fan, MLB Interview, and Video Board Moment. Two categories were consolidated into one (for a total of 18): Call, TV/Radio (from Call, TV, and Call, Radio). Two categories were renamed: Best Hitter (formerly Best Everyday Player) and Best Pitcher (formerly Best Starting Pitcher).

In 2017, the awards were issued for the final time. The number of awards was reduced again to 10.

== Awards ==
The order of awards (as listed on MLB.com) was:

- Best Major Leaguer
- Best Hitter
- Best Pitcher
- Best Rookie
- Best Defensive Player
- Best Manager
- Best Executive
- Best Social Media Personality
- Best Play, Offense
- Best Play, Defense
- Best Major Leaguer, Postseason
- Best Moment
- Best Performance
- Best Social Media Post
- Best Fan Catch
- Best Call, TV/Radio
- Best Player–Fan Interaction
- Best Trending Topic

== Former awards ==
- Bizarre Play of the Year – see "Blooper of the Year" (below).
- Blooper of the Year (2002, 2004–2007; renamed Bizarre Play of the Year in 2003; renamed Oddity of the Year in 2008).
- Bounceback Player, Best (2014–2015; discontinued in 2016; formerly Comeback Player of the Year in 2011–2013).
- Breakout Everyday Player, Best (merged with Best Breakout Pitcher into "Best Breakout Player" in 2015; Breakout Player of the Year was added in 2010, but was divided into Breakout Hitter and Breakout Pitcher in 2012).
- Breakout Hitter of the Year (2012–2013; renamed Best Breakout Everyday Player in 2014).
- Breakout Pitcher (merged with Best Breakout Everyday Player into "Best Breakout Player" in 2015; Breakout Player of the Year was added in 2010, but was divided into Breakout Hitter and Breakout Pitcher in 2012).
- Breakout Player, Best (2015; discontinued in 2016; see "Breakout Everyday Player," above).
- Celebrity Fan, Best (2015; discontinued in 2016).
- Closer, Best (2004–2014; discontinued in 2015; see "Pitcher," "Setup Man," and "Starting Pitcher," below).
- Comeback Player of the Year (2011–2013; renamed Best Bounceback Player in 2014).
- Cut4 Topic, Best (2012–2014; divided into Fan Catch and Player–Fan Interaction in 2015; formerly Fan Moment in 2010–2011).
- Dependable Player of the Year (2010; discontinued in 2011).
- Everyday Player, Best (2014–2015); renamed Best Hitter in 2016; formerly Player of the Year (2002–2003 and 2010–2011); formerly Hitter of the Year (2004–2009 and 2012–2013).
- Fan Moment of the Year (2010–2011; renamed Cut4 Topic in 2012; then divided into Fan Catch and Player–Fan Interaction in 2015).
- Game of the Year (2010; renamed Walk-Off of the Year in 2011; discontinued in 2015).
- Hitter of the Year (2004–2009 and 2012–2013; renamed Best Everyday Player in 2014 and then Best Hitter in 2016).
- Hitting Performance, Best (merged with Pitching Performance into "Performance" in 2015; Individual Performance of the Year was added in 2003, was renamed Single-Game Performance in 2008, then renamed Performance in 2009, and was divided into Hitting Performance and Pitching Performance in 2012).
- Lifetime Achievement (2013; discontinued in 2014).
- MLB Interview, Best (2015; discontinued in 2016).
- MLB MVP (2012–2013; renamed Most Valuable Major Leaguer in 2014 and then Best Major Leaguer in 2015).
- Most Valuable Major Leaguer (2014; renamed Best Major Leaguer in 2015; formerly MLB MVP in 2012–2013).
- Oddity, Best (2008–2014); discontinued in 2015; formerly Blooper of the Year (2002 and 2004–2007) and Bizarre Play of the Year (2003).
- Outfield Throw, Best (2014; discontinued in 2015).
- Performance of the Year (divided into Hitting Performance and Pitching Performance in 2012; see "Hitting Performance," above).
- Pitcher of the Year (from 2002 to 2003, it included starters and closers, but not setup men; renamed Starting Pitcher of the Year in 2004; see "Closer," above, "Setup Man," below, and "Starting Pitcher," below).
- Pitching Performance (merged with Hitting Performance into "Performance" in 2015; see "Hitting Performance," above).
- Play of the Year (2002–2014; divided into Best Play, Offense, and Best Play, Defense, in 2015).
- Player of the Year (2002–2003 and 2010–2011); renamed Hitter of the Year (2004–2009 and 2012–2013); renamed Best Everyday Player in 2014 and then Best Hitter in 2016.
- Postseason Moment of the Year (2007–2013; divided into Best Postseason Play, Best Postseason Walk-Off, and Best Postseason Storyline in 2014).
- Postseason MVP (2010–2014; renamed Best Major Leaguer, Postseason, in 2015).
- Postseason Play, Best (2014; discontinued in 2015).
- Postseason Storyline, Best (2014; discontinued in 2015).
- Postseason Walk-Off, Best (2014; discontinued in 2015).
- Setup Man, Best (2002–2014; discontinued in 2015).
- Single-Game Performance of the Year (renamed Performance of the Year; see "Hitting Performance," above).
- Starting Pitcher, Best (2004–2015; renamed Best Pitcher in 2016; formerly Pitcher of the Year in 2002–2003; see "Pitcher," "Closer," and "Setup Man," above).
- Storyline, Best (2012–2014; discontinued in 2015).
- Unsung Star of the Year (2009; renamed X-Factor Player of the Year in 2010; renamed Wow Factor of the Year in 2011; discontinued in 2012).
- Video Board Moment (2015; discontinued in 2016).
- Walk-Off of the Year (2011; discontinued in 2015; see "Game of the Year," above).
- Wow Factor of the Year – see "Unsung Star of the Year" (above).
- X-Factor Player of the Year – see "Unsung Star of the Year" (above).

== Award winners ==
2002–present

- For each year's awards (2002–present) – at MLB.com – see footnote.

2002–2014

- Many of the awards for 2002 to 2014 are listed on the GIBBY Awards / This Year in Baseball Awards page at Baseball-Almanac.com

2015–2017

- The awards for 2015 to 2017 are listed on the Esurance MLB Awards page at Baseball-Almanac.com

Individual years

- 2002–2009 This Year in Baseball Awards (MLB.com) (or Baseball-Almanac.com)
- 2010 This Year in Baseball Awards (The GIBBYS) (MLB.com) or Baseball-Almanac.com)
- 2011 GIBBYS – Greatness in Baseball Yearly Awards (MLB.com) (or Baseball-Almanac.com)
- 2012 GIBBYS – Greatness in Baseball Yearly Awards (MLB.com) (or Baseball-Almanac.com)
- 2013 GIBBYS – Greatness in Baseball Yearly Awards (MLB.com) (or Baseball-Almanac.com)
- 2014 GIBBYS – Greatness in Baseball Yearly Awards (MLB.com) (or Baseball-Almanac.com)
- 2015 Esurance MLB Awards (MLB.com) (or BleacherReport.com or Baseball-Almanac.com)
- 2016 Esurance MLB Awards (MLB.com) (or Baseball-Almanac.com)
- 2017 Esurance MLB Awards (MLB.com) (or Baseball-Almanac.com)

== See also ==
- Baseball awards § United States
- List of MLB awards
- Minor League Baseball Yearly (MiLBY) Awards (formerly "This Year in Minor League Baseball Awards")
