= Baseball awards =

Trophy or other recognition given to a baseball player or team

Professional baseball leagues, amateur-baseball organizations, sportswriting associations, and other groups confer awards on various baseball teams, players, managers, coaches, executives, broadcasters, writers, and other baseball-related people for excellence in achievement, sportsmanship, and community involvement.

== International ==
=== World Baseball Softball Confederation (WBSC) ===
==== Baseball Division ====
- Senior Athlete of the Year
- Junior Athlete of the Year
- Coach of the Year
- Umpire of the Year
- Member Federation Executive of the Year

=== World ===
==== Adult baseball ====
- WBSC Baseball World Rankings (men's)
- WBSC Baseball World Rankings (women's)
- WBSC Premier12 championship (national teams)
- World Baseball Classic championship trophy (national teams)
- World Baseball Classic Most Valuable Player
- World Baseball Classic All–WBC team
- U-23 Baseball World Cup (WBSC) (national teams; under 23)
- Baseball World Cup championship (originally called the Amateur World Series, from 1938 to 1986) (discontinued after 2011)
  - Baseball World Cup Most Valuable Player
  - Baseball World Cup All-Star Team and tournament awards
- Women's Baseball World Cup championship (national teams)
- Women's Baseball World Cup All-Star team
- Women's Baseball World Series (discontinued after 2004)
- Intercontinental Cup championship (discontinued after 2010)
- World Port Tournament championship (last held in 2019)
- Haarlem Baseball Week championship
- Haarlem Baseball Week tournament awards (Best Pitcher, Best Hitter, Best Defending Player, Home Run King, Most Valuable Player, Most Popular Player, Press Award)
- World Baseball Challenge tournament championship
- Grand Forks International tournament championship
- Baseball at the Summer Olympics
  - List of Olympic medalists in baseball
- Baseball at the Summer Universiade
- World University Baseball Championship

==== Youth baseball ====
- U-18 Baseball World Cup (WBSC) (national teams; under 18)
- U-15 Baseball World Cup (WBSC) (national teams; under 15)
- U-12 Baseball World Cup (WBSC) (national teams; under 12)
- Big League World Series championship (community teams; ages 16–18) (discontinued after 2016)
- Big League World Series international-bracket championship (discontinued after 2016)
- Big League World Series international regional championships (discontinued after 2016)
- Senior League World Series championship (community teams; ages 14–16)
- Senior League World Series international regional championships
- Junior League World Series championship (community teams; ages 13–15)
- Junior League World Series international-bracket championship
- Junior League World Series international regional championships
- Intermediate League World Series championship (community teams; ages 11–13)
- Intermediate League World Series international-bracket championship
- Intermediate League World Series international regional championships
- Little League World Series championship (community teams; ages 11–13)
- Little League World Series international-bracket championship (1976–present)
- Little League World Series international regional championships:
  - For U.S. regional champions, see #Little League Baseball
  - Former international regions: Europe Region (1960–2000), Europe Region (2001–2003), Europe, Middle East, and Africa (EMEA) Region (2004–2007), Transatlantic Region (2001–2007), Europe Region (2008–2012), Middle East-Africa Region (2008–2012), Far East Region (1962–2000), Asia Region (2001–2006), Pacific Region (2001–2006), Asia-Pacific Region (2007–2012)
  - Canada Region championship
  - Mexico Region championship
  - Caribbean Region championship
  - Latin America Region championship
  - Japan Region championship
  - Asia-Pacific and Middle East Region championship
  - Europe and Africa Region championship
  - Australia Region championship
- Palomino League World Series championship (community teams; ages 17–19)
- Colt League World Series championship (community teams; ages 15–16)
- Pony League World Series championship (community teams; ages 13–14)
- Pony-13 League World Series championship (community teams; age 13)
- Bronco League World Series championship (community teams; ages 11–12)
- Bronco-11 League World Series championship (community teams; age 11)
- Mustang League World Series championship (community teams; ages 9–10)
- Cal Ripken Major/70 World Series championship (community teams; ages 11–12)
- Cal Ripken Major/60 World Series championship (community teams; ages 11–12)

=== Africa ===
- Africa Cup Baseball Championship
- Baseball at the African Games
- Big League World Series – Europe–Africa Region championship (community teams; ages 16–18) (discontinued in 2016)
- Senior League World Series – Europe–Africa Region championship (community teams; ages 14–16)
- Junior League World Series – Europe–Africa Region championship (community teams; ages 13–15)
- Intermediate League World Series – Europe–Africa Region championship (community teams;ages 11–13)
- Little League – Europe, Middle East & Africa Region championship (2004–2007) (community teams; ages 11–13)
- Little League – Middle East–Africa Region championship (2008–2012) (community teams; ages 11–13)
- Little League World Series – Europe and Africa Region championship (2013 – ) (community teams; ages 11–13)

=== Americas ===
- See also Latino Baseball Hall of Fame
- Caribbean Series championship (club teams)
- Caribbean Series Most Valuable Player
- Baseball at the Central American and Caribbean Games
- Baseball at the Pan American Games (men's and women's)
- Baseball at the South American Games
- Copa América de Béisbol
- Serie de las Américas
- Baseball Champions League Americas
- Caribbean Baseball Cup
- South American Baseball Championship
- Latino Legends Team (US; Major League Baseball)
- Big League World Series – Latin America Region championship (community teams; ages 16–18) (discontinued after 2016)
- Senior League World Series – Latin America Region championship (community teams; ages 14–16)
- Junior League World Series – Latin America Region championship (community teams; ages 13–15)
- Intermediate League World Series – Latin America Region championship (community teams; ages 11–13)
- Little League World Series – Caribbean Region championship (community teams; ages 11–13)
- Little League World Series – Latin America Region championship (community teams; ages 11–13)
- U-10 Pan-American Youth Baseball Championship

=== Asia ===
- Asia Series championship (top teams of the professional baseball leagues)
- Asian Baseball Championship (national teams)
- Asia Professional Baseball Championship
- Baseball at the Asian Games
  - List of Asian Games medalists in baseball
- Baseball at the Southeast Asian Games
- Baseball at the East Asian Games
- SAARC Baseball Championship (South Asia; national teams)
- Baseball at the Far Eastern Championship Games (discontinued)
- MALB Asean Series (professional teams)
- Asian Junior Baseball Championship (national teams; under 18)
- Asian 15U Baseball championship (national teams; under 15)
- Asian 12U Baseball championship (national teams; under 12)
- Big League World Series – Asia–Pacific Region championship (community teams; ages 16–18) (discontinued in 2016)
- Senior League World Series – Asia–Pacific Region championship (community teams; ages 14–16)
- Junior League World Series – Asia–Pacific Region championship (community teams; ages 13–15)
- Intermediate League World Series – Asia–Pacific Region championship (community teams; ages 11–13)
- Little League – Far East Region championship (1962–2000) (community teams; ages 11–13)
- Little League – Asia Region championship (2001–2006) (community teams; ages 11–13)
- Little League – Asia–Pacific Region championship (2007–2012) (community teams; ages 11–13)
- Little League World Series – Asia–Pacific and Middle East Region championship (2013 – ) (community teams; ages 11–13)

=== Europe ===
- European Baseball Championship (national teams)
- Baseball Champions League Europe
- European Champion Cup (one winner; top four teams of the two European Cups)
- European Champions Cup (two winners; top teams of the professional baseball leagues)
- CEB Cup (second-tier club teams)
- Federations Cup (third-tier club teams)
- Federations Cup qualifiers (thourth-tier club teams)
- Euro League Baseball (ELB) championship (Gregory Hallman Trophy)
- European Under-21 Baseball Championship (national teams; under 21)
- European Junior Baseball Championship (national teams; under 18)
- European Youth Baseball Championship (national teams; under 15)
- European Juveniles Baseball Championship (national teams; under 12)
- Big League World Series – Europe–Africa Region championship (community teams; ages 16–18) (discontinued in 2016)
- Senior League World Series – Europe–Africa Region championship (community teams; ages 14–16)
- Junior League World Series – Europe–Africa Region championship (community teams; ages 13–15)
- Intermediate League World Series – Europe–Africa Region championship (community teams; ages 11–13)
- Little League – Europe Region championship (1960–2000) (community teams; ages 11–13)
- Little League – Europe Region championship (2001–2003) (and co-terminus Transatlantic Region) (community teams; ages 11–13)
- Little League – Europe / Europe, Middle East & Africa Region championship (2004–2007) (and co-terminus Transatlantic Region) (community teams; ages 11–13)
- Little League – Transatlantic Region championship (2001–2007) (community teams; ages 11–13)
- Little League – Europe Region championship (2008–2012) (community teams; ages 11–13)
- Little League World Series – Europe and Africa Region championship (2013 – ) (community teams; ages 11–13)
- See also footnote

=== Oceania ===
- Oceania Baseball Championship (national teams)
- Baseball at the Pacific Games
- Baseball at the Micronesian Games
- Big League World Series – Asia–Pacific Region championship (community teams; ages 16–18) (discontinued in 2016)
- Senior League World Series – Asia–Pacific Region championship (community teams; ages 14–16)
- Junior League World Series – Asia–Pacific Region championship (community teams; ages 13–15)
- Intermediate League World Series – Asia–Pacific Region championship (community teams; ages 11–13)
- Little League – Far East Region championship (1962–2000) (community teams; ages 11–13)
- Little League – Pacific Region championship (2001–2006) (community teams; ages 11–13)
- Little League – Asia–Pacific Region championship (2007–2012) (community teams; ages 11–13)
- Little League World Series – Asia–Pacific and Middle East Region championship (2013 – ) (community teams; ages 11–13)

== American Samoa ==
- Note: Although American Samoa is an unincorporated territory of the United States, it competes separately in international baseball. See: American Samoa national baseball team

== Australia ==
=== In general ===
- Greater Brisbane League club championship
- New South Wales Major League club championship
- Australia Women's Championships (baseball)
- Australian Universities Championship Series — see Baseball at the Australian University Games
- Australian Schools Championship (baseball)
- Baseball at the Australian Masters Games (quadrennial)
- Junior League World Series – Australia Region championship (community teams; ages 13–15)
- Little League World Series – Australia Region championship (community teams; ages 11–13)

=== Claxton Shield ===
- Claxton Shield champions — National competition
- Claxton Shield awards:
  - Helm's Award (Tournament Most Valuable Player)
  - Batting Champion
  - Pitcher of the Year
  - Golden Glove (Fielding award)
  - Rookie of the Year
  - Manager of the Year

=== Baseball Australia Diamond Awards ===
- President's Award
- ABF Life Membership
- Administrator of the Year Award
- Club of the Year Award
- Official of the Year Award
- Volunteer of the Year Award
- Coach of the Year Award
- Player of the Year (Open Women's Award)
- Player of the Year (Youth Award)
- State of the Year

=== Australian Baseball League (2010- ) ===
- Championship Series champion
- Helms Award Winner (league Most Valuable Player)
- All-Star Game MVP

== Austria ==
- See also footnote
- Baseball League Austria (BLA) championship (German Wikipedia)
- Austrian Baseball Federation (Austrian Youth Championships)
  - Youth Championship

== Brazil ==
- Brazilian Baseball Championship

== Canada ==
- Ligue de Baseball Junior Élite du Québec championship (amateur league)
- Ligue de Baseball Senior Elite du Quebec championship (amateur league)
- New Brunswick Senior Baseball League championship (amateur league)
- Nova Scotia Senior Baseball League championship (amateur league)
- Harry Hallis Memorial Trophy (Western Major Baseball League champion)
- Tip O'Neill Award
- Jack Graney Award
- Baseball at the Canada Summer Games (quadrennial)
- Big League World Series – Canada Region championship (discontinued after 2016)
- Senior League World Series – Canada Region championship
- Junior League World Series – Canada Region championship
- Intermediate League World Series – Canada Region championship
- Little League World Series – Canada Region championship

== China ==
- China Baseball League championship
- Chinese Professional Baseball championship

== Colombia ==
- Colombian Professional Baseball League championship (winter league)

== Croatia ==
- See footnote

== Cuba ==
- Cuban National Series championship (amateur leagues)
- Cuban National Series Most Valuable Player Award
- Cuban National Series Rookie of the Year Award
- Cuban League championship (discontinued in 1961; professional winter league)

== Dominican Republic ==
- Dominican Professional Baseball League championship (winter league) (winner takes part in the Caribbean Series)
- Dominican Summer League championship (See U.S. minor leagues § Rookie leagues below.)

== France ==
- Division Élite#Champions

== Germany ==
- Bundesliga championship
- Junior German champions
- Youth German champions
- Students German champions

== Greece ==
- Greek Baseball League championship (2000–2014)

== Guam ==
- Although Guam is an unincorporated territory of the United States, it competes separately in international baseball. See: Guam national baseball team

== Hong Kong ==
- Although Hong Kong is a special administrative region of the People's Republic of China, it competes separately in international baseball. See: Hong Kong national baseball team

== Iran ==
- Iran Baseball Championship

== Ireland ==
- Irish Baseball League championship
  - Andy Leonard League MVP Award
  - Tommy Bond Best Pitcher Award
- Irish Baseball League A
- Irish Baseball League B

== Italy ==
- Italian Baseball Series championship (professional; major league)
- Italian Baseball League 2D championship (professional; minor league)
- Serie A Federale championship (amateur)
- See also footnote

== Japan ==
- Japan Series championship
- Central League championship
- Pacific League championship
- Nippon Professional Baseball Most Valuable Player Award
- Nippon Professional Baseball Rookie of the Year Award
- Eiji Sawamura Award (top starting pitcher in all of Nippon Professional Baseball)
- Most Valuable Pitcher award (Central League)
- Most Valuable Pitcher award (Pacific League)
- Best Nine Award – best player at each position in both the Central League and Pacific League
- Mitsui Golden Glove Award
- Nippon Professional Baseball Comeback Player of the Year Award
- Golden Spirit Award
- Japan Series Most Valuable Player
- Nippon Professional Baseball All-Star Game Most Valuable Player
- Matsutaro Shoriki Award
- Japan Women's Baseball League championship
- Japanese High School Baseball Championship (Summer Koshien)
- Japanese High School Baseball Invitational Tournament championship (Spring Koshien)
- Little League World Series – All-Japan championship (1967–2006)
- Little League World Series – Japan Region championship (2007– )

== Mexico ==
- Mexican League championship
- Mexican Pacific League championship (winner takes part in the Caribbean Series) (winter league)
- Mexican Academy League championships (Class A summer league and Rookie-level winter league; feeder league for Mexican League)
- Mexican Northern League championship (feeder league for Mexican League)
- Veracruz Winter League championship (winter league)
- Big League World Series – Mexico Region championship (community teams; ages 16–18) (1985–1988; from 2006 to 2016, in odd-numbered years) (discontinued in 2016)
- Junior League World Series – Mexico Region championship (community teams; ages 13–15) (1986–1999; since 2004, in even-numbered years)
- Little League World Series – Mexico Region championship (community teams; ages 11–13)

== Netherlands ==
- See also footnote
- Holland Series championship (first tier; winner takes part in the European Cup)
- Honkbal Overgangsklasse championship (second tier; winner is promoted to first tier)
- Honkbalweek Haarlem Cup championship (youth)

== Nicaragua ==
- Nicaraguan Professional Baseball League championship (off-season league)

== Palau ==
- Palau Major League championship

== Panama ==
- Panamanian Professional Baseball League championship (winter league)

== Philippines ==
- Baseball Philippines series championship

== Poland ==
- Extra league baseball series championship

== Portugal ==
- Liga Atlântica de Basebol championship

== Puerto Rico ==
- Although Puerto Rico is a United States commonwealth, it competes separately in international baseball. See: Baseball in Puerto Rico, Puerto Rico national baseball team, and Puerto Rico women's national baseball team.
- See also footnote
- Liga de Beisbol Profesional Roberto Clemente (formerly the Puerto Rico Professional Baseball League) championship (winter league) (winner takes part in the Caribbean Series)
- Federacion de Beisbol Aficionado de Puerto Rico championship (amateur)
- Big League World Series – Puerto Rico Region championship (community teams; ages 16–18) (1981–1997; from 2006 to 2016, in even-numbered years) (discontinued in 2016)
- Junior League World Series (Puerto Rico Region) championship (community teams; ages 13–15) (1982–1999; since 2004, in odd-numbered years)
- Intermediate League World Series (Puerto Rico Region) championship

== South Korea ==
- Korean Series championship
- KBO League Most Valuable Player Award
- Choi Dong-won Award (pitcher of the year)
- KBO League Rookie of the Year
- KBO League Golden Gloves
- Korean Series Most Valuable Player Award
- KBO League All-Star Game Most Valuable Player Award
- Phoenix Flag National High School Baseball Championship
- Blue Dragon Flag National High School Baseball Championship
- Golden Lion Flag National High School Baseball Championship
- President's Cup National High School Baseball Championship

== Spain ==
- See also footnote
- División de Honor de Béisbol championship

== Sweden ==
- Elitserien championship

== Taiwan ==
- Taiwan Series championship
- CPBL MVP of the Year Award
- CPBL Rookie of the Year Award
- CPBL Manager of the Year Award
- CPBL Golden Glove Award
- CPBL most progressive award (comeback player)
- Taiwan Series MVP
- Taiwan Series Outstanding Player
- CPBL All-Star Game MVP
- CPBL MVP of the Month

== United Kingdom ==
- Championship Series of the National League

== U.S. Virgin Islands ==
- Although the U.S. Virgin Islands is an unincorporated territory of the United States, it competes separately in international baseball. See: U.S. Virgin Islands national baseball team

== Venezuela ==
- Venezuelan Professional Baseball League championship [winter league] (winner team takes part in the Caribbean Series)
- Liga Paralela de Béisbol en Venezuela championship (winter league; MLB-affiliated)
- Luis Aparicio Award. See also: #U.S. major leagues: Awards by organizations other than MLB
- Big League World Series (Venezuela Region) (community teams, ages 16–18) (1984–1997)

== United States major leagues: Awards by Major League Baseball (MLB) ==
- The following awards (except the Edgar Martínez Award, Baseball Assistance Team (B.A.T.) awards, Beacon Awards, and the Fishel Award) appear at MLB.com, on its awards page
- Each award is given to a player (or manager) in each league, except where noted by a superscript ¹

=== Annual awards ===
- Commissioner's Trophy (World Series champion)
  - World Series rings: Given to members of the World Series champions
- William Harridge Trophy (American League champion)
- Warren C. Giles Trophy (National League champion)
- MLB Most Valuable Player Award: given to the best all-around player
- Cy Young Award: given to the best pitcher
- Jackie Robinson Rookie of the Year Award
- Manager of the Year Award
- Platinum Glove Award: given to the best defensive player in each league
- All-MLB Team – First named in 2019; honors the top players in MLB at all positions (first and second teams, each with one player at each non-pitching position, one designated hitter, five starting pitchers, and two relievers)
- Rawlings Gold Glove Awards: given to the best fielder at each position
- Wilson Overall Defensive Player of the Year Award^{1}: given to the best defensive player in all of Major League Baseball (in 2012 and 2013, one award in each league)
- Wilson Defensive Player of the Year Award^{1}: given to the best fielder at each position in all of Major League Baseball (in 2012 and 2013, was given to one player on each team)
- Wilson Defensive Team of the Year^{1}: given to the best defensive team in all of Major League Baseball
- Silver Slugger Awards: given to the best offensive player at each position
- Players Choice Awards
  - Player of the Year (in MLB; for all positions)^{1}
  - Outstanding Player (in each league)
  - Outstanding Pitcher (in each league)
  - Outstanding Rookie (in each league)
  - Comeback Player (in each league)
  - Marvin Miller Man of the Year Award (in MLB)^{1}
  - Majestic Athletic Always Game Award (in MLB)^{1}
- Hank Aaron Award: given to the best offensive performer
- Rod Carew American League Batting Champion
- Tony Gwynn National League Batting Champion
- Major League Baseball Reliever of the Year Award – Two awards for relief pitchers, one for each MLB league:
  - Mariano Rivera American League Reliever of the Year Award
  - Trevor Hoffman National League Reliever of the Year Award
- MLB Delivery Man of the Year Award¹: given to the best relief pitcher (discontinued and replaced in 2014, by the Mariano Rivera AL and Trevor Hoffman NL Reliever of the Year awards)
- Rolaids Relief Man Award: given to the best relief pitcher (discontinued in 2013)
- Edgar Martínez Outstanding Designated Hitter Award (American League)
- MLB Comeback Player of the Year Award
- MLB Clutch Performer of the Year Award (discontinued)
- Roberto Clemente Award¹: given to a player who "best exemplifies the game of baseball, sportsmanship, community involvement and the individual's contribution to his team"
- World Series MVP Award¹
- National League Championship Series MVP Award
- Lee MacPhail MVP Award (American League Championship Series)
- MLB All-Star Game team members
- Ted Williams MVP Award¹ (All-Star Game) (from 1970 to 1984, the award was known as the "Commissioner's Trophy", which became the name for the World Series Trophy in 1985)
- All-Star Game—Home Run Derby champion¹
- Baseball Assistance Team (B.A.T.) awards:
  - Big B.A.T./Frank Slocum Award: given to "an individual or a group of individuals whose exemplary service to the B.A.T. organization has helped provide dignity and self-esteem to members of the Baseball Family.
  - Bart Giamatti Award: given to the "individual associated with baseball who best exemplifies the compassion demonstrated by the late commissioner." Generally, it is given to a player involved in a wide range of charity work, benefitting both those involved with the game of baseball and those in the community at large.
  - Bobby Murcer Award: given to the team from each league that donates the most money during the annual B.A.T. Spring Training Fundraising Tour.
- Beacon Awards: Beacon of Life Award, Beacon of Change Award, and Beacon of Hope Award
- Commissioner's Award for Philanthropic Excellence
- Fishel Award: for public-relations excellence
- Bob Feller Act of Valor Award
- Esurance MLB Awards (formerly "This Year in Baseball Awards" (2002–2009) and then the "GIBBY Awards" (Greatness in Baseball Yearly) (2010–2014))¹: voting by fans, media, front-office personnel, former players, and SABR. (discontinued after 2017)
  - Best Major Leaguer – formerly MLB MVP¹ (2012–2013; renamed "Most Valuable Major Leaguer" in 2014 and then "Best Major Leaguer" in 2015)
  - Best Hitter – formerly Hitter of the Year Award¹ (2004–2009 and 2012–2013), "Player of the Year" (2002–2003 and 2010–2011), and "Best Everyday Player" (2014–2015)
  - Best Pitcher (for all pitchers) – formerly Starting Pitcher of the Year Award¹ (2004–2013) and Best Starting Pitcher (2014–2015); formerly "Pitcher of the Year"—from 2002 to 2003—including starters and closers, but not setup men); in 2015, there was no awards category for Closer or Setup Man
  - Best Rookie – formerly Rookie of the Year Award¹
  - Best Starting Pitcher (discontinued in 2016) – see: "Best Pitcher," above
  - Best Closer (discontinued in 2015) – formerly Closer of the Year Award¹ (2004–2013); formerly "Pitcher of the Year"—from 2002 to 2003—including starters and closers, but not setup men)
  - Best Setup Man (discontinued in 2015) – formerly Setup Man of the Year Award¹ (2002–2013)
  - Best Defensive Player – formerly Defensive Player of the Year Award¹
  - Best Breakout Everyday Player (discontinued in 2016) – formerly Breakout Hitter of the Year Award¹ (formerly "Breakout Player of the Year")
  - Best Breakout Pitcher (discontinued in 2016) – formerly Breakout Pitcher of the Year Award¹ (formerly "Breakout Player of the Year")
  - Best Bounceback Player (discontinued in 2016) – formerly Comeback Player of the Year Award¹
  - Wow Factor of the Year Award¹ (discontinued in 2012) (formerly "Unsung Star of the Year" and "X-Factor Player of the Year")
  - Dependable Player of the Year Award¹ (2010; discontinued in 2011)
  - Best Social Media Personality
  - Best Executive – formerly Executive of the Year Award¹
  - Best Manager – formerly Manager of the Year Award¹
  - Best Major Leaguer, Postseason – formerly Postseason MVP Award¹
  - Lifetime Achievement Award¹ (2013; discontinued in 2014)
  - Best Play, Defense – formerly Play of the Year Award¹
  - Best Play, Offense – formerly Play of the Year Award
  - Best Outfield Throw (2014; discontinued in 2015)
  - Best Moment – formerly Moment of the Year Award¹
  - Best Storyline – formerly Storyline of the Year Award¹ (discontinued in 2015)
  - Best Performance – formerly Hitting Performance of the Year Award¹ and Pitching Performance of the Year (both were formerly "Single-Game Performance of the Year" and then "Performance of the Year")
  - Best Social Media Post
  - Best Celebrity Fan (2015; discontinued in 2016)
  - Best Fan Catch
  - Best MLB Interview (2015; discontinued in 2016)
  - Best Call, TV/Radio
  - Best Player–Fan Interaction
  - Best Video Board Moment (2015; discontinued in 2016)
  - Best Trending Topic
  - Best Oddity (discontinued in 2015) – formerly Oddity of the Year Award¹ (formerly "Blooper of the Year" and "Bizarre Play of the Year")
  - Best Walk-Off (discontinued in 2015) – formerly Walk-Off of the Year Award¹ (formerly "Game of the Year")
  - Best Cut4 Topic (divided into Best Fan Catch and Best Player-Fan Interaction in 2015; both were discontinued in 2016) – formerly Cut4 Topic of the Year Award¹ (formerly "Fan Moment of the Year")
  - Postseason Moment of the Year Award¹ (replaced by Best Postseason Play, Best Postseason Walk-Off, and Best Postseason Storyline in 2014) (all three were discontinued in 2015)

=== Monthly and weekly awards ===
- Note: The following monthly and weekly awards appear at MLB.com, on its awards page for the current season
- Player of the Month (NL since 1958; AL since 1974)
- Pitcher of the Month (NL since 1975; AL since 1979)
- Reliever of the Month (NL & AL since 2017)
- Rookie of the Month (NL & AL since 2001)
- Delivery Man of the Month¹ (discontinued after the 2013 season)
- Clutch Performer of the Month¹ (discontinued)
- Players of the Week (all positions)

=== One-time awards ===
- Note: The following awards are one-time-only awards.
- Triple Crown (batting)
- Triple Crown (pitching)
- Commissioner's Historic Achievement Award
- MLB All-Century Team (1999)
- Latino Legends Team (2005)
- DHL Hometown Heroes (2006): the most outstanding player in the history of each MLB franchise, based on on-field performance, leadership quality and character value.
- Rawlings All-time Gold Glove Team (2007)

¹ A combined award is given for the American and National Leagues.

== American major leagues: Awards by organizations other than MLB ==
- Note: The following awards do not appear at MLB.com, on its awards page

(Each award is given to a player (or manager) in each league, except where noted by a superscript ¹.)

=== All-time ===
- MLB All-Time Team (1997; Baseball Writers' Association of America)
- MLB All-Time Manager (1997; BBWAA)
- Baseball's 100 Greatest Players (1998; The Sporting News)

=== All-decade ===
1990s

- Baseball Prospectus "Internet Baseball Awards" Team of the Decade¹ (1999)
- Players Choice Awards Player of the Decade¹ (1999)
- The Sporting News Player of the Decade¹ (1999)

2000s

- Sporting News All-Decade Team¹ (2009)
- Sports Illustrated MLB All-Decade Team¹ (2009)
- Sporting News MLB Athlete of the Decade¹ (2009)
- Sports Illustrated Player of the Decade¹ (2009)
- Sporting News Manager of the Decade¹ (2009)
- Sports Illustrated Best Manager¹ (2009)
- Sporting News Team of the Decade¹ (2009)
- Sports Illustrated MLB Top Single-Season Team of the Decade¹ (2009)
- Sporting News Executive of the Decade¹ (2009)
- Sports Illustrated Best General Manager¹ (2009)
- Sports Illustrated Best Franchise¹ (2009)
- Sporting News Performance of the Decade¹ (2009)
- Sporting News Game of the Decade¹ (2009)
- Sports Illustrated Best Regular-Season Game¹ (2009)
- Sports Illustrated Best Post-Season Game¹ (2009)

=== Other individual awards ===
- Baseball America Major League Player of the Year¹ (for all positions)
- Best Major League Baseball Player ESPY Award¹ (for all positions)
- Sporting News Player of the Year¹ (for all positions) (there are also Starting Pitcher and Relief Pitcher awards for each league)
- Baseball Digest Player of the Year¹ (for position players) (from 1969 to 1993, included all positions; in 1994, a separate Pitcher of the Year award was added)
- BBWAA New York Chapter Willie, Mickey and the Duke Award¹: presented to a group of players or a specific team who are forever linked in baseball history.
- BBWAA New York Chapter Sid Mercer-Dick Young Player of the Year Award¹ (discontinued; replaced by the New York Player of the Year Award)
- "Greg Spira Memorial Internet Baseball Awards" Most Valuable Player
- NLBM Oscar Charleston Legacy Award ("Most Valuable Players")
- The Sporting News Most Valuable Player Award (discontinued in 1946)
- Baseball Digest Pitcher of the Year¹
- "Greg Spira Memorial Internet Baseball Awards" Pitcher of the Year
- NLBM Leroy "Satchel" Paige Legacy Award ("Pitchers of the Year"; 2000–2005)
- NLBM Wilbur "Bullet" Rogan Legacy Award ("Pitchers of the Year"; 2006–present)
- Sporting News Pitcher of the Year (replaced in 2013 by Starting Pitcher and Relief Pitcher of the Year awards)
- Sporting News Starting Pitcher of the Year (2013–present)
- NLBM Hilton Smith Legacy Award ("Relievers of the Year")
- Sporting News Reliever of the Year (formerly The Sporting News Fireman of the Year Award, for closers, from 1960 to 2000) (discontinued in 2011)
- Sporting News Relief Pitcher of the Year (2013–present)
- Warren Spahn Award¹ (best left-handed pitcher)
- Baseball America Rookie of the Year¹
- "Greg Spira Memorial Internet Baseball Awards" Rookie of the Year
- NLBM Larry Doby Legacy Award ("Rookies of the Year")
- Sporting News Rookie of the Year (For its first three years—1946 to 1948—and in 1950, the award was given to only one player in all of MLB. In 1949 and from 1951 to the present, the award has been given in each of the two leagues. In 1961 and from 1963 through 2003, TSN split the rookie award into two separate categories: Rookie Pitcher of the Year and Rookie Player of the Year.)
- Baseball America All-Rookie Team
- Topps All-Star Rookie Team
- Sophomore of the Year Award (discontinued in 1963)
- NLBM Walter "Buck" Leonard Legacy Award (batting champions)
- Babe Ruth Home Run Award¹ (MLB home run leader) (discontinued in 2010)
- Mel Ott Award (NL home run leader)
- NLBM Josh Gibson Legacy Award (AL & NL "Home Run" leaders)
- NLBM James "Cool Papa" Bell Legacy Award ("Stolen Base" leaders)
- Fielding Bible Award (defense)
- Sporting News Comeback Player of the Year
- Sporting News All-Star Team (From 1925 to 1960, the team was a combined team for both leagues. Starting in 1961, a team was named for each league.)
- Babe Ruth Award¹ (postseason MVP) (since 2007; was awarded to the MVP of the World Series from 1949 to 2006)
- MLB Insiders Club Magazine All-Postseason Team
- Heart & Hustle Award¹: given by the Major League Baseball Players Alumni Association to a player who excels on the field and "best embodies the values, spirit and tradition of the game."
- Hutch Award¹: given to a player who best exemplifies the fighting spirit and competitive desire to win.
- Lou Gehrig Memorial Award¹: given to a player who best exemplifies his character and integrity both on and off the field.
- Tony Conigliaro Award¹: given to a player who best overcomes an obstacle and adversity through the attributes of spirit, determination and courage.
- BBWAA New York Chapter Arthur and Milton Richman "You Gotta Have Heart" Award¹
- Branch Rickey Award¹: given to a player in recognition of exceptional community service.
- BBWAA New York Chapter Joan Payson/Shannon Forde Award¹: for excellence in community service
- Luis Aparicio Award (Venezuelan player) (See also: § Venezuela, above.)
- Baseball America Manager of the Year^{1}
- Chuck Tanner Major League Baseball Manager of the Year Award¹
- "Greg Spira Memorial Internet Baseball Awards" Manager of the Year
- NLBM Charles Isham "C. I." Taylor Legacy Award ("Managers of the Year")
- Sporting News Manager of the Year
- Associated Press Manager of the Year (discontinued in 2001)
- Honor Rolls of Baseball (managers)
- Baseball America Major League Coach of the Year¹
- Baseball America Major League Executive of the Year¹
- NLBM Andrew "Rube" Foster Legacy Award ("Executives of the Year")
- Sporting News Executive of the Year¹
- Honor Rolls of Baseball (executives)
- Baseball America Roland Hemond Award: for long-term contributions to scouting and player development
- Baseball America Lifetime Achievement Award
- Buck O'Neil Lifetime Achievement Award (National Baseball HoF; presented no more frequently than every third year)
- NLBM Jackie Robinson Lifetime Achievement Award: for "Career Excellence in the Face of Adversity"
- NLBM John Henry "Pop" Lloyd Legacy Award: in recognition of "Baseball and Community Leadership"
- Baseball America Organization of the Year^{1}
- Ford C. Frick Award (National Baseball HoF; for broadcasters)
- BBWAA Career Excellence Award (Baseball Writers' Association of America; for writers)
- NLBM Sam Lacy Legacy Award ("Baseball Writer of the Year")
- Honor Rolls of Baseball (baseball writers)
- Hall of Fame (umpires)
- Retired numbers (umpires)
- Honor Rolls of Baseball (umpires)
- NLBM John "Buck" O'Neil Legacy Award: given to a local or national corporate/private philanthropist for "Outstanding Support of the NLBM"

^{1} A combined award is given for the American and National leagues.

=== Awards given to specific teams ===
- Ohio Cup (trophy awarded to winner of Reds–Guardians best-of-6 regular-season series)
- BP Crosstown Cup (trophy awarded to winner of White Sox–Cubs best-of-6 regular-season series)

=== Awards given to members of specific teams ===
- Cincinnati Reds: Ernie Lombardi Award (MVP)
- Cincinnati Reds: Pitcher of the Year
- Cleveland Guardians: Bob Feller Man of the Year Award (player or other team personnel)
- Cleveland Guardians: Frank Gibbons-Steve Olin Good Guy Award
- Detroit Tigers: Tiger of the Year
- Detroit Tigers: Tiger Rookie of the Year Award
- Detroit Tigers: King Tiger Award (for on-field and off-field contributions)
- Houston Astros: Darryl Kile Good Guy Award
- Los Angeles Angels of Anaheim: Gene Autry Trophy (MVP)
- Los Angeles Dodgers: Roy Campanella Award (spirit and leadership)
- Montreal Expos: Player of the Year (discontinued in 2004)
- New York Mets and New York Yankees: BBWAA New York Chapter "New York Player of the Year Award" (replaced the Sid Mercer-Dick Young Player of the Year Award)
- New York Yankees: James P. Dawson Award (best rookie)
- Oakland Athletics: Catfish Hunter Award (most inspirational player)
- Philadelphia Phillies: Mike Schmidt Most Valuable Player Award, Steve Carlton Most Valuable Pitcher Award, Dallas Green Special Achievement Award, Tug McGraw Good Guy Award, and Charlie Manuel Award for Service and Passion to Baseball
- Philadelphia Phillies: Richie Ashburn Special Achievement Award (player or other team personnel)
- San Francisco Giants: Willie Mac Award (spirit and leadership)
- St. Louis Cardinals: Darryl Kile Good Guy Award
- Toronto Blue Jays: Neil MacCarl Award (player of the year)

== American minor leagues ==
=== In general ===
==== Awards by Minor League Baseball (MiLB) ====
- Minor League Baseball Yearly (MiLBY) Awards (formerly "This Year in Minor League Baseball Awards"):
  - Best Starter (in each of five levels: Triple-A, Double-A, Class A Advanced, Class A – Full Season, and Class A – Short Season)
  - Best Hitter (in each of five levels: Triple-A, Double-A, Class A Advanced, Class A – Full Season, and Class A – Short Season)
  - Best Reliever (in each of five levels: Triple-A, Double-A, Class A Advanced, Class A – Full Season, and Class A – Short Season)
  - Best Game (in each of five levels: Triple-A, Double-A, Class A Advanced, Class A – Full Season, and Class A – Short Season)
  - Best Team (in each of five levels: Triple-A, Double-A, Class A Advanced, Class A – Full Season, and Class A – Short Season)
  - Homer of the Year (one overall winner, for all of minor-league baseball)
  - Play of the Year (one overall winner, for all of minor-league baseball)
  - Moment of the Year (one overall winner, for all of minor-league baseball)
  - Best Promotion of the Year (one overall winner, for all of minor-league baseball)
  - Best Theme Night of the Year (one overall winner, for all of minor-league baseball)
  - Best Giveaway of the Year (one overall winner, for all of minor-league baseball)
  - Best Celebrity Appearance of the Year (one overall winner, for all of minor-league baseball)
  - Best Miscellaneous Promotion of the Year (one overall winner, for all of minor-league baseball)
- MiLB Topps Minor League Player of the Year Award (Topps Player of the Year, across all of MiLB)
- MiLB George M. Trautman Awards (Topps Player of the Year, in each of the domestic minor leagues)
- MiLB Joe Bauman Home Run Award
- John H. Johnson President's Award (franchise)
- Rawlings Woman Executive of the Year
- Warren Giles Award (league president)
- King of Baseball
- Larry MacPhail Award (team promotions)
- Sheldon "Chief" Bender Award (player development)
- Mike Coolbaugh Award (work ethic, knowledge of the game, and mentoring young players)
- 100 Best Minor League Baseball Teams (1901–2001)

==== Awards by organizations other than MiLB ====
- Baseball America Minor League Player of the Year Award
- The Sporting News Minor League Player of the Year Award
- USA Today Minor League Player of the Year Award
- Baseball America Minor League All-Star Team (First team and Second team)
- Baseball America Triple-A Classification All-Star Team
- Baseball America Double-A Classification All-Star Team
- Baseball America High Class A Classification All-Star Team
- Baseball America Low Class A Classification All-Star Team
- Baseball America Rookie-Level Classification All-Star Team
- Baseball America Dominican Summer League Classification All-Star Team
- Baseball America Short-Season Classification All-Star Team
- Topps Short Season-A/Rookie All-Star Team
- Baseball America Independent Leagues Player of the Year
- Larry Doby Award (MLB "Futures Game" MVP)
- Baseball America Minor League Manager of the Year
- Baseball America Minor League Team of the Year
- Baseball America Minor League Executive of the Year
- Sporting News Minor League Organization of the Year
- Minor League News Farm System of the Year
- Baseball America Bob Freitas Awards (for outstanding minor-league operations at Triple-A, Double-A, Class A, and short-season)
- Baseball America Independent Organization of the Year
- Ballpark Digest Awards (minor leagues, independent leagues, and collegiate summer leagues)
- STMA Sports Turf Manager of the Year Awards (in Triple-A, Double-A, Class A, and Short-Season/Rookie; chosen from the 16 league winners)

==== Awards by MLB team organizations ====
- Houston Astros: Minor League Player of the Year and Minor League Pitcher of the Year
- Los Angeles Dodgers: Minor League Player of the Year and Pitcher of the Year
- New York Yankees: Kevin Lawn Awards for player of the year and pitcher of the year
- Philadelphia Phillies: Paul Owens Award for player of the year and pitcher of the year.
- Toronto Blue Jays: Minor League Player of the Year

=== Triple-A ===
- Triple-A National Championship Game (2006– )
- Triple-A National Championship Game Most Valuable Player Award
- Triple-A All-Star Game (The awards vary from year to year: Stars of the Game, Top Stars, MVP (discontinued), Stars of Stars (discontinued), Batter-of-the-Game (discontinued), Pitcher-of-the-Game (discontinued).)
- Little World Series championship (1904–1931)
- Junior World Series championship (1932–1975)
- Triple-A Classic championship (1988–1991)
- Triple-A World Series championship (1983, 1998–2000)

==== International League ====
- International League Governors' Cup (Championship Series champion)
- International League Most Valuable Player Award
- International League Pitcher of the Year Award (formerly the Most Valuable Pitcher Award)
- International League Top MLB Prospect Award (formerly the Rookie of the Year Award)
- International League Manager of the Year Award
- Thruway Cup (trophy awarded to the team with the best record among the Buffalo Bisons, Rochester Red Wings, and Syracuse Mets in games played against each other during the International League regular season)

==== Pacific Coast League ====
- Pacific Coast League championship
- Pacific Coast League Most Valuable Player Award
- Pacific Coast League Pitcher of the Year Award
- Pacific Coast League Top MLB Prospect Award (formerly the Rookie of the Year Award)
- Pacific Coast League post-season All-Star teams
- Pacific Coast League Manager of the Year Award
- Pacific Coast League Executive of the Year Award

=== Double-A ===
- Double-A All-Star Game (1991–2002)

==== Eastern League ====
- Eastern League championship
- Eastern League Most Valuable Player Award
- Eastern League Pitcher of the Year Award
- Eastern League Rookie of the Year Award
- Eastern League Manager of the Year Award

==== Southern League ====
- Southern League All-Star Game
- Southern League championship
- Southern League Manager of the Year Award
- Southern League Most Outstanding Pitcher Award
- Southern League Most Valuable Player Award

==== Texas League ====
- Texas League championship
- Texas League Most Valuable Player Award
- Texas League Pitcher of the Year Award
- Texas League Manager of the Year Award
- Texas League Mike Coolbaugh Memorial Coach of the Year Award

=== Single-A Advanced ===
==== California League ====
- California League championship
- California League Most Valuable Player Award
- California League Pitcher of the Year Award
- California League Rookie of the Year Award
- Carolina/California All-Star Game Most Valuable Player Award
- California League Manager of the Year Award
- California League Executive of the Year Award
- California League Organization of the Year Award
- Doug Harvey Award (umpire of the year)

==== Carolina League ====
- Carolina League championship
- Carolina League Most Valuable Player Award
- Carolina League Pitcher of the Year
- Carolina League Championship Series Most Valuable Player
- Carolina/California All-Star Game Most Valuable Player
- Carolina League Manager of the Year
- Carolina League Calvin Falwell Executive of the Year
- Carolina League Matt Minker Community Service Award

==== Florida State League ====
- Florida State League championship
- Florida State League Player of the Year Award
- Florida State League Pitcher of the Year Award
- Florida State League Manager of the Year Award

=== Single-A ===
==== Midwest League ====
- List of Midwest League champions
- Midwest League Manager of the Year Award
- Midwest League Most Valuable Player Award
- Midwest League Top MLB Prospect Award

==== South Atlantic League ====
- South Atlantic League championship

=== Single-A Short Season ===
==== New York-Penn League ====
- New York–Penn League championship

==== Northwest League ====
- Northwest League#Champions

=== Rookie Advanced ===
==== Appalachian League ====
- List of Appalachian League champions

==== Pioneer League ====
- Pioneer League (baseball)#League champions

=== Rookie leagues ===
==== Arizona League ====
- Arizona League#Champions

==== Dominican Summer League ====
- Dominican Summer League#Champions

==== Gulf Coast League ====
- Gulf Coast League championship

=== Fall leagues (affiliated) ===
==== Arizona Fall League ====
- Arizona Fall League championship
- Arizona Fall League Joe Black MVP Award
- Arizona Fall League Dernell Stenson Sportsmanship Award

== American independent professional leagues ==
=== Traditional season ===
League championships

- American Association of Professional Baseball championship
- Atlantic League of Professional Baseball championship
- Empire Professional Baseball League championship
- Frontier League championship
- Pecos League championship
- United Shore Professional Baseball League championship

Individual awards

- Baseball America Independent Leagues Player of the Year

=== Winter ===
- Arizona Winter League championship
- California Winter League championship
- Desert League of Professional Baseball championship

== American adult and semi-professional baseball ==
=== National Adult Baseball Association (NABA) ===
- NABA Phoenix World Championship Series
  - Division championships: 18 Wood, 18AA, 18A, 18 Rookie, 25 Wood, 25 Aluminum, 35 Wood, 35 Aluminum, 45 Wood, 45 Aluminum, 50 Wood, 55 Wood, 60 Wood.
  - Awards:
    - Team Champions: team trophy and NABA World Series championship rings
    - Team Runner-up: team trophy and NABA World Series championship watches
    - Team Pool Champion: team pool trophy
    - Championship Game Gold Glove: individual Gold Glove award for each championship game
    - Championship Game MVP: individual MVP award for each championship game
    - Pool Game MVP: individual Game MVP award in each pool game for both teams
- NABA Women's World Championship Series
  - Awards:
    - Champions: team trophy and NABA World Series commemorative championship medal
    - Runner-up: team trophy and NABA World Series commemorative finalist medal
    - Pool Winner: team pool trophy
    - Championship Game Gold Glove: individual Gold Glove award for each championship game
    - Championship Game MVP: individual MVP award for each championship game
    - Pool Game MVP: individual Game MVP award in each pool game for both teams
- NABA Florida World Championship Series
  - Division championships: 18AA, 18A, 18 Rookie, 18 Open Wood Bat, 25 Rookie, 35 Rookie, 45 Rookie, 55 Rookie
  - Awards:
    - Champions: team trophy and NABA World Series championship rings
    - Runner-up: team trophy and NABA World Series championship watches
    - Pool Winner: team pool trophy
    - Championship Game Gold Glove: individual Gold Glove award for each championship game
    - Championship Game MVP: individual MVP award for each championship game
    - Pool Game MVP: individual Game MVP award in each pool game for both teams
- NABA tournaments

== American amateur baseball ==
=== All-American Amateur Baseball Association (AAABA) ===
- AAABA World Series

=== National Amateur Baseball Federation ===
- NABF Major World Series championship

=== Special Olympics ===
- Baseball at the Special Olympics USA National Games

=== State Games of America ===
- Baseball at the State Games of America

== American collegiate summer baseball ==
=== National Alliance of College Summer Baseball (NACSB) ===
- Most Valuable Program Award

=== National Amateur Baseball Federation (NABF) ===
- NABF College World Series championship

=== National Baseball Congress (NBC) ===
- NBC World Series championship
- Graduate of the Year

== American college baseball ==
=== Team awards ===
- College World Series championship (NCAA Division I)
- NCAA Division II Baseball Championship
- NCAA Division III Baseball Championship
- NAIA Baseball World Series championship
- NCBA World Series division D1 championship (National Club Baseball Association)
- NCBA World Series division D2 championship
- JUCO World Series (NJCAA) championship
- American Baseball Coaches Association (ABCA) National Champions in: NCAA Divisions I, II, and III, NAIA, and NJCAA Divisions I, II, and III
- American Baseball Coaches Association (ABCA) Conference Champions in: NCAA Division I, II, and III conferences, NAIA conferences, NJCAA Division I, II, and III conferences, NCCAA conferences, and community-college conferences
- Big 12 Conference championship
- Big 12 Conference Tournament championship
- Big East Conference championship
- Big East Conference Tournament championship
- Big Ten Conference championship (1896–1980 and 1993–present)
- Big Ten Conference Tournament championship (1981–present)

=== Individual awards ===
- Dick Howser Trophy (player of the year) (National Collegiate Baseball Writers Association)
- Baseball America College Player of the Year Award
- Golden Spikes Award (outstanding amateur player) (USA Baseball)
- American Baseball Coaches Association (ABCA) Player of the Year in: NCAA Divisions I, II, and III, NAIA, and NJCAA Divisions I, II, and III
- Collegiate Baseball Player of the Year (NCAA Division I)
- Rotary Smith Award (1988–2003; most outstanding player) (discontinued)
- Roger Clemens Award (pitcher) (discontinued)
- National Pitcher of the Year Award (College Baseball Foundation)
- Johnny Bench Award (catcher)
- Brooks Wallace Award (shortstop)
- John Olerud Award (two-way player)
- D3baseball.com Player of the Year (Division III)
- D3baseball.com Pitcher of the Year (Division III)
- Lowe's Senior CLASS Award (baseball) (outstanding senior NCAA Division I Student-Athlete of the Year in baseball)
- All-America teams:
  - ABCA/Rawlings All-Americans (first, second, and third teams) in: NCAA Divisions I, II, and III, NAIA, and NJCAA Divisions I, II, and III
  - Baseball America All-America teams
  - Collegiate Baseball All-Americans (NCAA Division I)
  - D3baseball.com All-Americans (Division III)
  - NCBWA All-Americans
  - College Baseball All-America Team consensus selections
- ABCA/Rawlings Gold Glove in: NCAA Divisions I, II, and III, NAIA, NJCAA Divisions I, II, and III, and Pacific Association Division
- ABCA/Rawlings All-Region teams in: NCAA Divisions I, II, and III, NAIA, and NJCAA Divisions I, II, and III
- College World Series Most Outstanding Player
- JUCO World Series MVP (NJCAA)
- JUCO World Series All-Tournament team (NJCAA)
- Baseball America Freshman of the Year
- Collegiate Baseball Freshman Pitcher of the Year
- Collegiate Baseball Freshman Player of the Year
- Baseball America Freshman All-America Team
- Louisville Slugger's Freshmen All-American Baseball Team (Collegiate Baseball)
- Baseball America Summer College Player of the Year
- American Baseball Coaches Association (ABCA) National and Regional Coaches of the Year in: NCAA Divisions I, II, and III, NAIA, NJCAA Divisions I, II, and III, and Pacific Association Division
- Baseball America College Coach of the Year
- Collegiate Baseball Coach of the Year (NCAA Division I)
- National Collegiate Baseball Writers Association (NCBWA) National Coach of the Year
- Skip Bertman Award (National Coach of the Year)
- Chuck Tanner Collegiate Baseball Manager of the Year Award
- ABCA/Baseball America Assistant Coach of the Year
- Conference coaches of the year (NCAA Division I conferences)
- National Collegiate Umpire Award (College Baseball Foundation)
- George H.W. Bush Distinguished Alumnus Award (College Baseball Foundation)
- Baseball Field of the Year Award
- ABCA/Turface Athletics Field Maintenance Awards

=== Conference-specific awards ===
- America East Conference baseball awards
- American Athletic Conference baseball awards
- ASUN Conference baseball awards
- Atlantic 10 Conference baseball awards
- Atlantic Coast Conference baseball awards
- Big 12 Conference baseball awards
- Big Ten Conference baseball awards
- Mid-American Conference Baseball Player and Pitcher of the Year
- Pac-12 Conference baseball awards
- Southeastern Conference baseball awards
- Southern Conference baseball awards

== American high-school baseball ==
- American Baseball Coaches Association (ABCA)/Rawlings High School Player of the Year
- Baseball America High School Player of the Year Award
- Gatorade High School Baseball Player of the Year
- USA Today High School Baseball Player of the Year
- Aflac National High School Player of the Year
- Baseball America High School Team of the Year
- USA Today All-USA High School Baseball Team
- Jackie Robinson Award: to the high school player entering senior year and best displays character, leadership, and the values of being a student-athlete in academics and community affairs
- ABCA/Rawlings High School All-America Baseball Team (first, second, and third teams)
- Baseball America High School All-America Teams
- ABCA/Rawlings High School Gold Glove
- Under Armour All-America Baseball Game (all-star game)
- Perfect Game All-American Classic (East-West all-star game)
- ABCA/Rawlings High School All-Region teams
- Baseball America Youth Player of the Year
- USA Today High School Baseball Coach of the Year
- ABCA/Diamond High School National and Regional Coaches of the Year
- Baseball America Youth Coach of the Year
- The National Classic (tournament for top high-school teams) (Fullerton, California)
- Perfect Game All-American Classic (all-star game for rising seniors) (San Diego, California)
- Slammers Baseball / NABA 18 & Under and 16 & Under High School Showcase Tournament (wood bat)
  - Division championships:
    - 18 & Under (seniors and juniors) – Goodyear, Arizona
    - 16 & Under (sophomores and freshmen) – Glendale, Arizona
  - Awards:
    - Champions: team trophy and individual awards
    - Runner-up: team trophy
    - Championship Game Gold Glove: individual Gold Glove award for each championship game
    - Championship Game MVP: individual MVP award for each championship game
- Maine Baseball Coaches Association awards

== American youth baseball ==
=== National Youth Baseball Championship ===
- 12U National Youth Baseball Championship
- 10U National Youth Baseball Championship

=== American Amateur Baseball Congress (AABC) ===
- Stan Musial World Series national championship (ages 19 and over)
- Connie Mack World Series national championship (ages 18 and under)
- Don Mattingly World Series national championship (age 17)
- Mickey Mantle World Series national championship (ages 16 and under)
- Ken Griffey, Jr. World Series national championship (age 15)
- Sandy Koufax 14U World Series national championship (ages 14 and under)
- Sandy Koufax 13S World Series national championship (age 13)
- Pee Wee Reese World Series national championship (ages 12 and under)
- Gil Hodges World Series national championship (age 11)
- Willie Mays World Series national championship (ages 10 and under)
- Jackie Robinson World Series national championship (age 9)
- Roberto Clemente World Series national championship (ages 7–8)
- Rod Carew World Series national championship (ages 6 and under)

=== American Legion Baseball ===
- American Legion Baseball national championship (ages 19 and under)
- American Legion Baseball state champions (including Puerto Rico)
- Louisville Slugger Batting Champion (highest batting average during national competition)
- Bob Feller Pitching Award (pitcher with most strikeouts in regional and national competition)
- Dr. Irvin L. "Click" Cowger RBI Memorial Award (most RBI at the regional tournament and World Series)
- Rawlings Big Stick Award (player who rounds the most bases in regional and national competition)
- George W. Rulon Player of the Year (based on integrity, mental attitude, cooperation, citizenship, sportsmanship, scholastic aptitude and general good conduct)
- James F. Daniel, Jr. Memorial Sportsmanship Award (Legion World Series participant who best embodies the principles of good sportsmanship)
- All-Academic Team
- Jack Williams Memorial Leadership Award (manager and coach of the national championship team)
- American Legion Graduate of the Year (an alumnus, who is a Major League Baseball player; for character, leadership, playing abilities and community service)

=== Babe Ruth League ===
- See also footnote
- 16-18-year-old baseball World Series national championship
- 13-15-year-old baseball World Series national championship
- 14-year-old baseball World Series national championship
- 13-year-old baseball World Series national championship
- Cal Ripken Major/70 baseball World Series national championship (ages 11–12) (The U.S. champion plays the International champion for the World Series title.)
- Cal Ripken Major/60 baseball World Series national championship (ages 11–12) (From 2000 to 2006, the U.S. champion played an International champion for the World Series title.)
- Cal Ripken 10-year-old baseball World Series national championship

=== Dixie Boys Baseball ===
- Dixie Majors World Series national championship (ages 15–19)
- Dixie Pre Majors World Series national championship (ages 15–16)
- Dixie Boys World Series national championship (ages 13–14)
- Junior Dixie Boys World Series national championship (age 13)

=== Dixie Youth Baseball ===
- See footnote
- Majors World Series national championship (ages 12 and under)
- AAA World Series national championship (ages 10 and under)
- "O" Zone World Series national championship

=== Little League Baseball ===
- Big League World Series national champions (ages 16–18) (discontinued after 2016)
- Category:Big League World Series regions: Central, East, Southeast, Southwest, and West regions (discontinued after 2016)
- Big League World Series state champions (including District of Columbia, Northern California, Southern California, Texas East, Texas West, and Dakotas champions) (discontinued after 2016)
- Category:Senior League World Series regions (ages 14–16): Central, East, Southeast, Southwest, and West regions
- Senior League World Series state champions (including District of Columbia, Northern California, Southern California, Texas East, Texas West, and Dakotas champions)
- Junior League World Series national champions (ages 13–15)
- Category:Junior League World Series regions: Central, East, Southeast, Southwest, and West regions
- Junior League World Series state champions (including District of Columbia, Northern California, Southern California, Texas East, Texas West, and Dakotas champions)
- Intermediate League World Series national champions (ages 11–13)
- Category:Intermediate League World Series regions: Central, East, Southeast, Southwest, and West regions
- Intermediate League World Series state champions (including District of Columbia, Northern California, Southern California, Texas East, Texas West, and Dakotas champions)
- Little League World Series national champions (1976–present) (ages 11–13)
- Little League World Series regional champions (U.S.):
- For international regional champions, see § World
  - New England Region (Maine New Hampshire, Vermont, Massachusetts, Rhode Island, Connecticut)
  - Mid-Atlantic Region (Pennsylvania, New York, New Jersey, Maryland, DC, Delaware)
  - Midwest Region (North Dakota/South Dakota, Nebraska, Kansas, Minnesota, Iowa, Missouri)
  - Great Lakes Region (Michigan, Wisconsin, Ohio, Indiana, Illinois. Kentucky)
  - Southeast Region (Virginia, West Virginia, North Carolina, South Carolina, Georgia, Florida, Alabama, Tennessee)
  - Southwest Region (Mississippi, Louisiana, Arkansas, Texas East, Texas West, Oklahoma, Colorado, New Mexico)
  - Northwest Region (Arkansas, Washington, Oregon, Idaho, Montana, Wyoming)
  - West Region (Arizona, Nevada, Utah, California Northern, California Southern, Hawaii)
- Little League World Series state champions (including District of Columbia, Northern California, Southern California, Texas East, Texas West, and Dakotas champions) (ages 11–13)
- Little League World Series district champions (ages 11–13)
- Little League Baseball awards:
- See also: Peter J. McGovern Little League Museum#Hall of Excellence
  - Good Sport of the Year Award
  - Challenger Award
  - ASAP (A Safety Awareness Program) Award
  - Bill Shea Distinguished Little League Graduate Award
  - Mom of the Year Award
  - George and Barbara Bush Little League Parents of the Year Award
  - Volunteer of the Year Award
  - Howard and Gail Paster Little League Urban Initiative Volunteer of the Year Award
  - Howard Hartman Little League Friendship Award

=== National Amateur Baseball Federation (NABF) ===
- NABF Senior World Series (ages 18 and under)
- NABF High School World Series (ages 17 and under)
- NABF Junior World Series (ages 16 and under)
- NABF Sophomore World Series (ages 14 and under)
- NABF Freshman World Series (ages 12 and under)
- NABF Rookie World Series (ages 10 and under)

=== PONY Baseball ===
- Palomino League World Series (ages 17–19) (including community teams from other nations)
- Colt League World Series (ages 15–16) (including community teams from other nations)
- Pony League World Series (ages 13–14) (including community teams from other nations)
- Pony-13 League World Series (age 13) (including community teams from other nations)
- Bronco League World Series (ages 11–12) (including community teams from other nations)
- Bronco-11 League World Series (age 11) (including community teams from other nations)
- Mustang League World Series (ages 9–10) (including community teams from other nations)

=== Reviving Baseball in Inner Cities (RBI) ===
- See footnotes
- Senior Boys RBI World Series (ages 16–18)
- Junior Boys RBI World Series (ages 13–15)

=== USSSA Baseball ===
- USSSA Wilson DeMarini Elite World Series:
  - 14U-60/90-BBCOR championship
  - 13U-60/90 championship
  - 12U championship
  - 11U championship
  - 10U championship
  - 9U championship
  - 8U-KP championship

== Baseball book of the year ==
- Casey Award
- Seymour Medal (SABR)
- Baseball America § Best baseball books

== See also ==
- Category:Baseball museums and halls of fame
- Associated Press Athlete of the Year
- Sporting News Sportsman of the Year
- Sports Illustrated Sportsman of the Year
- Best Female Athlete ESPY Award
- Best Male Athlete ESPY Award
- Hickok Belt trophy (professional athlete of the year)
- Baseball statistics
- Interleague play § Interleague statistics
- List of organized baseball leagues
- Athlete of the Year
- Most Valuable Player
- Player of the year award
- Rookie of the Year (award)
- History of baseball outside the United States
- List of sport awards § Baseball
- Major achievements in baseball and softball by nation
