= Chuck Tanner Baseball Manager of the Year Award =

The Chuck Tanner Baseball Manager of the Year Award is the original name for two awards that are given by the Rotary Club of Pittsburgh, in Pittsburgh, Pennsylvania. It is named for Chuck Tanner, former manager of the Pittsburgh Pirates, and was first awarded on November 17, 2007, at the city's Rivers Club. For the first three years, the award was given to a manager in Major League Baseball. In 2010, a second award was presented to the "Chuck Tanner Collegiate Baseball Manager of the Year"; the original award was renamed the "Chuck Tanner Major League Baseball Manager of the Year Award".

During the selection process, a major factor for the committee is each candidate's career achievement.

Proceeds from the annual awards dinner in November are used by the club to support its humanitarian service initiatives and Rotary Foundation programs.

== Winners ==
=== Chuck Tanner Major League Baseball Manager of the Year Award ===
See footnote

Year	Winner	Team	Ref
2007	Joe Torre	Los Angeles Dodgers	
2008	Joe Maddon	Tampa Bay Rays	
2009	Ron Gardenhire	Minnesota Twins	
2010	Charlie Manuel	Philadelphia Phillies	
2011	Jim Leyland	Detroit Tigers	
2012	Davey Johnson; Bob Melvin	Washington Nationals; Oakland Athletics	

=== Chuck Tanner Collegiate Baseball Manager of the Year Award ===
- 2010 – Joe Jordano, University of Pittsburgh
- 2011 - Jim Chester, Penn State Greater Allegheny
- 2012 - Loren Torres, Point Park University

== See also ==
- Manager of the Year Award
- The Sporting News Manager of the Year Award
- MLB This Year in Baseball Awards Manager of the Year
- Baseball America Manager of the Year
- Baseball Prospectus Internet Baseball Awards Manager of the Year
- Associated Press Manager of the Year (discontinued in 2001)
- Honor Rolls of Baseball#Managers
- Sporting News Manager of the Decade (2009)
- Sports Illustrated MLB Manager of the Decade (2009)
- MLB All-Time Manager (1997; BBWAA)
- MLB all-time managerial wins
- Baseball awards#U.S. major leagues: Awards by organizations other than MLB
- List of MLB awards
- List of college baseball awards#Coaching awards
- Baseball awards#U.S. college baseball
