= Major League Baseball All-Century Team =

Chosen by popular vote of fans

In 1999, the Major League Baseball All-Century Team was chosen by popular vote of fans. To select the team, a panel of experts first compiled a list of the 100 greatest Major League Baseball (MLB) players from the 20th century. Over two million fans then voted on the players using paper and online ballots.

The top two vote-getters from each position, except outfielders (nine), and the top six pitchers were placed on the team. A select panel then added five legends to create a thirty-man team:—Warren Spahn (who finished #10 among pitchers), Christy Mathewson (#14 among pitchers), Lefty Grove (#18 among pitchers), Honus Wagner (#4 among shortstops), and Stan Musial (#11 among outfielders).

The nominees for the All-Century team were presented at the 1999 MLB All-Star Game at Fenway Park. Preceding Game 2 of the 1999 World Series, the members of the All-Century Team were revealed. Every living player named to the team attended.

== Selected players ==
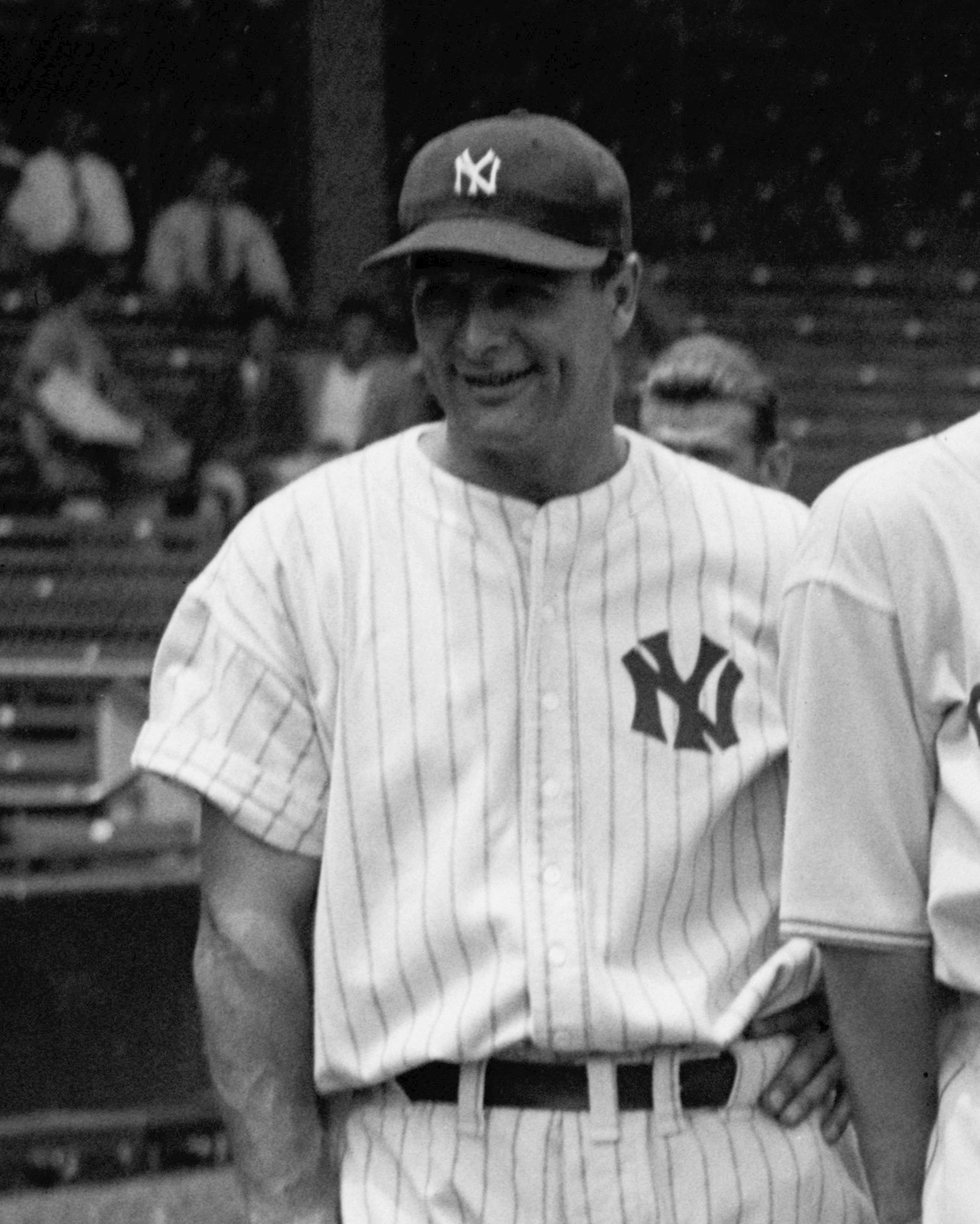
Lou Gehrig received the most votes of any player.

Key
*	'Legends' chosen by select panel
**	Player still active in 1999
ö	Player is deceased
†	Elected to the Baseball Hall of Fame

Player	Position	Votes
Nolan Ryan^{†}	Pitcher	992,040
Sandy Koufax^{†}	Pitcher	970,434
Cy Young^{†ö}	Pitcher	867,523
Roger Clemens**	Pitcher	601,244
Bob Gibson^{†ö}	Pitcher	582,031
Walter Johnson^{†ö}	Pitcher	479,279
Warren Spahn^{†ö}*	Pitcher	337,215
Christy Mathewson^{†ö}*	Pitcher	249,747
Lefty Grove^{†ö}*	Pitcher	142,169
Johnny Bench^{†}	Catcher	1,010,403
Yogi Berra^{†ö}	Catcher	704,208
Lou Gehrig^{†ö}	First baseman	1,207,992
Mark McGwire**	First baseman	517,181
Jackie Robinson^{†ö}	Second baseman	788,116
Rogers Hornsby^{†ö}	Second baseman	630,761
Mike Schmidt^{†}	Third baseman	855,654
Brooks Robinson^{†ö}	Third baseman	761,700
Cal Ripken Jr.^{†}**	Shortstop	669,033
Ernie Banks^{†ö}	Shortstop	598,168
Honus Wagner^{†ö}*	Shortstop	526,740
Babe Ruth^{†ö}	Outfielder	1,158,044
Hank Aaron^{†ö}	Outfielder	1,156,782
Ted Williams^{†ö}	Outfielder	1,125,583
Willie Mays^{†ö}	Outfielder	1,115,896
Joe DiMaggio^{†ö}	Outfielder	1,054,423
Mickey Mantle^{†ö}	Outfielder	988,168
Ty Cobb^{†ö}	Outfielder	777,056
Ken Griffey Jr.^{†}**	Outfielder	645,389
Pete Rose^{ö}	Outfielder	629,742
Stan Musial^{†ö}*	Outfielder	571,279

== Pete Rose controversy ==
There was controversy over the inclusion in the All-Century Team of Pete Rose, who had been banned from baseball for life 10 years earlier. Some questioned Rose's presence on a team officially endorsed by Major League Baseball, but fans at the stadium gave him a standing ovation. During the on-field ceremony, which was emceed by Hall of Fame broadcaster Vin Scully, NBC Sports' Jim Gray questioned Rose about his refusal to admit to gambling on baseball. Gray's interview became controversial, with some arguing that it was good journalism, while others objected that the occasion was an inappropriate setting for Gray's persistence. After initially refusing to do so, Gray apologized a few days later. On January 8, 2004, more than four years later, Rose admitted publicly to betting on baseball games in his 2004 autobiography My Prison Without Bars.

== See also ==
- Major League Baseball Centennial All-Time Teams
- Major League Baseball All-Time Team, a similar team chosen by the Baseball Writers' Association of America in 1997
- Latino Legends Team
- DHL Hometown Heroes (2006): the most outstanding player in the history of each MLB franchise, based on on-field performance, leadership quality and character value
- Baseball awards § United States
- List of MLB awards
- Team of the century
- National Baseball Hall of Fame and Museum
