= List of organized baseball leagues =

Organized baseball leagues include:

== International competition ==
- Many international baseball events are coordinated by the baseball division of the World Baseball Softball Confederation, including the World Baseball Classic.

== Americas ==
- Serie de las Américas
- Caribbean Series
- Baseball Champions League Americas

=== United States & Canada ===
==== Youth Leagues & Major Organizations ====
- American Legion Baseball, a youth program, headquartered in Indianapolis, Indiana.
- Babe Ruth League, a youth program, headquartered in Hamilton, New Jersey.
- Fellowship of Christian Athletes
- Little League Baseball, a youth program, headquartered in Williamsport, Pennsylvania.
- Pony Baseball, a youth program, headquartered in Washington, Pennsylvania

==== High school ====
- In the US, the National Federation of State High School Associations (NFHS) and each state association governs the play of baseball at the high school level. The Federated Christian Athletic Association (FCAA) and state Christian associations oversee the play of baseball at the private Christian School level. Note, however, that a substantial number of Christian schools choose instead to join their state's general athletic association if the organization's rules allow it.

==== Baseball for People with Disabilities ====
- Alternative Baseball, United States

==== Amateur baseball ====
- Abalone League, United States
- Ligue de Baseball Élite du Québec, Canada
- New Brunswick Senior Baseball League, Canada
- Nova Scotia Senior Baseball League, Canada
- National Adult Baseball Association, United States
- All-American Amateur Baseball Association, United States
- National Amateur Baseball Federation, United States
- American Amateur Baseball Congress, United States

==== College baseball ====
- NCAA conferences: Division I, Division II, Division III, and the College World Series (Div. I, Div. II, Div. III)
- NAIA conferences, including the NAIA Baseball World Series
- National Club Baseball Association (NCBA) conferences
- National Junior College Athletic Association (NJCAA) conferences
- Collegiate summer baseball leagues

==== Town Team Baseball ====
Townball is a popular tradition in the Upper Midwest, with grassroots support at the local level.

==== Professional baseball ====
- Major League Baseball (MLB) in the United States and Canada, made up of two component leagues;
  - National League
  - American League
- Minor League Baseball (MiLB) in the United States and Canada, comprising several levels and multiple component leagues;
  - Triple-A
    - International League
    - Pacific Coast League
  - Double-A
    - Eastern League
    - Southern League
    - Texas League
  - High-A
    - Midwest League
    - Northwest League
    - South Atlantic League
  - Single-A
    - California League
    - Carolina League
    - Florida State League
  - Rookie
    - Arizona Complex League
    - Florida Complex League
  - Fall baseball
    - Arizona Fall League
- Independent baseball leagues in the United States and Canada
  - MLB Draft League
  - MLB Partner leagues
    - American Association of Professional Baseball
    - Atlantic League of Professional Baseball
    - Frontier League
    - Pioneer League
  - Canadian Baseball League
  - Empire Professional Baseball League
  - Pecos League
  - United Shore Professional Baseball League

==== Instructional Leagues ====
- California Winter League*

==== Exhibition Leagues ====
- Banana Ball Championship League

=== Latin America ===
- Campeonato Brasileiro de Beisebol (CBB), Brazil
- Colombian Professional Baseball League (LPB), Colombia
- Cuban Elite League (LEB), Cuba
  - Cuban National Series (SNB), Cuba
- Curaçao Professional Baseball League (CPB), Curaçao
- Dominican Professional Baseball League (LIDOM), Dominican Republic
- Dominican Summer League (rookie), Dominican Republic
- Mexican Pacific League (LMP), Mexico
- Mexican League (LMB), Mexico
  - Liga Norte de México, Mexico
  - Mexican Academy League, Mexico
- Nicaraguan Professional Baseball League (LNBP), Nicaragua
- Panamanian Professional Baseball League (LPBP or Probeis), Panama
- Liga de Béisbol Profesional Roberto Clemente (LBPRC), Puerto Rico
- Venezuelan Professional Baseball League (LVBP), Venezuela
- Venezuelan Major League (LMBP), Venezuela

=== Defunct Leagues ===
- Federal League defunct since 1915, in the United States
- Union Association
- Negro league baseball, defunct since 1958, in the United States
- All-American Girls Professional Baseball League, defunct since 1954, in the United States
- Canadian Baseball League, defunct since 2003 in Canada
- Cuban League*
- Venezuelan Summer League
- North Country Baseball League
- Pacific Association of Professional Baseball Clubs
- Latin American Series

== Asia ==
- Asia Professional Baseball Championship
- Asia Series
- Asia Winter Baseball League

=== Japan ===
- Nippon Professional Baseball (NPB)
  - Central League (major)
    - Eastern League (minor)
  - Pacific League (major)
    - Western League (minor)
  - Japanese Baseball League (Former League of Central League and Pacific League)
- Shikoku Island League Plus (Independent)
- Baseball Challenge League (Independent)
- Kansai Independent Baseball League (defunct)
- Japan Women's Baseball League (Women's)

=== South Korea ===
- KBO League (major)
  - KBO Futures League (minor)
- Gyeonggi Challenge Baseball League (Independent)
- Korea Women's Baseball League (Women's)

=== Taiwan ===
- Chinese Professional Baseball League (CPBL, major)
- Taiwan Major League (TML, major, defunct)
- Popcorn League (semi-professional)

=== China ===
- China National Baseball League (defunct)
- China Baseball League (CBL)
- Chinese Professional Baseball (CPB)

=== Philippines ===
- 1United Philippines
- Baseball Philippines (defunct)
- Liga Baseball Philippines
- Philippine Baseball League (defunct)
- UAAP Baseball Championship

=== Other ===
- Iran Baseball Championship, Iran
- Malaysian All-Star League Baseball, Malaysia, Brunei, Indonesia
- Baseball United
- Vietnam Baseball Championship

=== Defunct Leagues ===
- Israel Baseball League

== Europe ==
- European Champions Cup, Europe's first-tier continental competition
- European Confederation Cup, Europe's second-tier continental competition
- European Federation Cup, Europe's third-tier continental competition
- Baseball-Bundesliga, Austria
- Croatian Baseball League, Croatia
- Czech Baseball Extraliga, Czech Republic
- Interlyga, Estonia, Latvia, Lithuania, Belarus, Russia
- Baseball Finnish Championship Series, Finland
- Division Élite, France
- Deutsche Baseball Liga, Germany
- Greek Baseball League, Greece
- Hungarian National Baseball League, Hungary
- Irish Baseball League, Ireland
- Italian Baseball League, Italy, San Marino
- Latvian Baseball League, Latvia
- Lithuanian Baseball League, Lithuania
- Honkbal Hoofdklasse, Netherlands
- Ekstraliga Baseball, Poland
- Bałtycka Liga Baseballu, Poland
- Liga Atlântica de Basebol, Portugal
- División de Honor de Béisbol, Spain
- Elitserien, Sweden
- National Baseball League, United Kingdom

== Oceania ==
- Australian Baseball League
- Greater Brisbane League, Australia
- New South Wales Major League, Australia
- Palau Major League, Palau

== See also ==
- Comparison of Major League Baseball and Nippon Professional Baseball
- List of professional sports leagues #Baseball
- Sport governing body
- Regulation of sport
- Outline of sports#General sports concepts
- Baseball awards
