= The National Classic =

High-school baseball tournament in California

The National Classic is a high-school baseball tournament that takes place in Fullerton, California. Started in 1989, it is one of the most prestigious high-school baseball tournaments in the country. The games are played at local high schools and at California State University Fullerton. The tournament invites the top schools from around the country to compete for the National Classic championship in front of an audience of professional and college scouts. The tournament is currently sponsored by Diamond Sports. A home run derby and a team introduction precedes the games. This tournament provides young stars with recognition and the opportunity to play against some of the best teams in the country. Some of the 115 professional players who have participated in the tournament are Alex Rodriguez, Dustin Pedroia, and Ian Kennedy.

== National Classic Past Results ==
Year	Champion	Runner up
2019	West Ranch High School, Valenica, CA	San Dimas HS, San Dimas CA
2018	Valley Christian Schools (San Jose, CA)	Mission Viejo High School, CA
2017	Bishop Amat High School, CA	Junipero Serra Catholic HS, CA
2016	Mountain Ridge (Glendale, Arizona)	El Toro (Lake Forest, CA)
2015	Agoura (Agoura Hills, CA)	IMG Academy (Bradenton, FL)
2014	Huntington Beach (Huntington Beach, CA)	Valley Christian Schools (San Jose, CA)
2013	Orange Lutheran (Orange, CA)	Cypress (Cypress, CA)

=== Hard 9 National Classic ===
- 2012 Champion El Dorado CA Runner Up El Toro CA
- 2011 Champion Bishop Amat CA Runner Up Esperanza CA

=== Diamond Sports National Classic ===
- 2010 Champion Crespi Carmelite CA Runner Up El Dorado CA

=== Anderson Bat National Classic ===
- 2009 Champion Mater Dei, Ca Runner Up El Toro, Ca
- 2008 Champion Crespi Carmelite, Ca Runner Up Orange Lutheran, Ca

=== Phil Nevin National Classic ===
- 2007 Champion Palm Beach Central, Fl Runner Up Riverside Polytechnic, Ca
- 2006 Champion De La Salle, Ca Runner Up Esperanza, Ca

=== Toyo Tires National Classic ===
- 2005 Champion Esperanza, Ca Runner Up Mater Dei, Ca
- 2004 Champion Villa Park, Ca Runner Up Crespi Carmelite, Ca
- 2003 Champion Taylorsville, Ut Runner Up El Dorado, Ca
- 2002 Champion Bishop Amat, Ca Runner Up La Quinta, Ca

=== The National Classic ===
- 2001 Champion Bishop Amat, Ca Runner Up Cypress, Ca
- 2000 Champion Gulliver Prep, Fl Runner Up Palm Bay, Fl
- 1999 Champion Bishop Moore, Fl Runner Up El Dorado, Ca
- 1998 Champion Wellington, Fl Runner Up Cooper, Fl
- 1997 Champion Esperanza, Ca Runner Up El Dorado, Ca

=== Dole National Classic ===
- 1996 Champion Westminster Christian, Fl Runner Up Mater Dei, Ca

=== Upper Deck National Classic ===
- 1995 Champion Germantown, Tn Runner Up Mater Dei, Ca
- 1994 Champion Rancho Bernardo, Ca Runner Up Mission Bay, Ca
- 1993 Champion Simi Valley, Ca Runner Up Irvine, Ca
- 1992 Champion Cherry Hill West, NJ Runner Up Westminster Christian, Fl
- 1991 Champion Esperanza, Ca Runner Up El Dorado, Ca
- 1990 Champion Westminster Christian, Fl Runner Up Southridge, Fl

== See also ==
- Perfect Game All-American Classic (all-star game for rising seniors) (San Diego, Calif.)
- Baseball awards#U.S. high-school baseball
- College baseball
- Australian Schools Championship (baseball)
- Japanese High School Baseball Championship ("Summer Koshien")
- Japanese High School Baseball Invitational Tournament ("Spring Koshien")
- High school baseball in South Korea
