= Major League Baseball All-Time Team =

The Major League Baseball All-Time Team was chosen in 1997 to comprise the top manager and top player in each of 13 positional categories across Major League Baseball history. The team, announced by Classic Sports Network in conjunction with the events celebrated around the 1997 Major League Baseball All-Star Game, were chosen by a panel of 36 members of the Baseball Writers' Association of America in a first- and second-place Borda count voting system.

Position	First-team selection	Team(s) represented by season	Year of induction into National Baseball Hall of Fame	Total votes (First-team votes)	Runner-up	Team(s) represented by season	Year of induction into National Baseball Hall of Fame	Total votes (First-team votes)
Catcher	Johnny Bench	Cincinnati Reds (1967–1983)	1989	52 (24)	Yogi Berra	New York Yankees (1946–1963); New York Mets (1965)	1972	22 (4)
First baseman	Lou Gehrig	New York Yankees (1923–1939)	1939	66½ (31)	Jimmie Foxx	Philadelphia Athletics (1925–1935); Boston Red Sox (1936–1942); Chicago Cubs (1942, 1944); Philadelphia Phillies (1945)	1951	19 (3)
Second baseman	Rogers Hornsby	St. Louis Cardinals (1915–1926, 1933); New York Giants (1927); Boston Braves (1928); Chicago Cubs (1929–1932); St. Louis Browns (1933–1937)	1942	44 (17)	Joe Morgan	Houston Astros (1963–1971, 1980); Cincinnati Reds (1972–1979); San Francisco Giants (1981–1982); Philadelphia Phillies (1983); Oakland Athletics (1984)	1990	23 (6)
Shortstop	Honus Wagner	Louisville Colonels (1897–1899); Pittsburgh Pirates (1900–1917)	1936	55 (23)	Cal Ripken Jr.	Baltimore Orioles (1981–2001)	2007	24 (6)
Third baseman	Mike Schmidt	Philadelphia Phillies (1972–1989)	1995	50 (21)	Brooks Robinson	Baltimore Orioles (1955–1977)	1983	37 (13)
Left fielder	Ted Williams	Boston Red Sox (1939–1942, 1946–1960)	1966	68 (32)	Stan Musial	St. Louis Cardinals (1941–1944, 1946–1963)	1969	36 (4)
Center fielder	Willie Mays	San Francisco Giants (1951–1952, 1954–1972); New York Mets (1972–1973)	1979	57 (25)	Ty Cobb	Detroit Tigers (1905–1926); Philadelphia Athletics (1927–1928)	1936	22 (7)
Right fielder	Babe Ruth	Boston Red Sox (1914–1919); New York Yankees (1920–1934); Boston Braves (1935)	1936	67 (31)	Hank Aaron	Milwaukee Braves (1954–1966; Atlanta Braves (1966–1975); Milwaukee Brewers (1975–1976)	1982	36 (5)
Designated hitter	Paul Molitor	Milwaukee Brewers (1978–1992); Toronto Blue Jays (1993–1995); Minnesota Twins (1996–1998)	2004	48 (22)	Harold Baines	Chicago White Sox (1980–1989, 1996–1997, 2001–2002); Texas Rangers (1989–1990); Oakland Athletics (1990–1992); Baltimore Orioles (1993–1995, 1997–1999, 2000); Cleveland Indians (1999)	2019	12 (3)
Right-handed starting pitcher	Walter Johnson	Washington Senators (1907–1927)	1936	30 (9)	Cy Young	Cleveland Spiders (1890–1898); St. Louis Perfectos (1899–1900); Boston Americans (1901–1908); Cleveland Naps (1909–1911); Boston Rustlers (1911)	1937	25 (12)
Left-handed starting pitcher	Sandy Koufax	Los Angeles Dodgers (1955–1966)	1972	32 (11)	Warren Spahn	Milwaukee Braves (1942, 1946–1964); New York Mets (1965); San Francisco Giants (1965)	1973	28 (11)
Relief pitcher	Dennis Eckersley	Cleveland Indians (1975–1977); Boston Red Sox (1978–1984, 1998); Chicago Cubs (1984–1986); Oakland Athletics (1987–1995); St. Louis Cardinals (1996–1997)	2004	40 (16)	Rollie Fingers	Oakland Athletics (1968–1976); San Diego Padres (1977–1980); Milwaukee Brewers (1981–1982, 1984–1985)	1992	29 (9)
Manager	Casey Stengel	Brooklyn Dodgers (1934–1936); Boston Braves (1938–1943); New York Yankees (1949–1960); New York Mets (1962–1965)	1966	22 (6)	Joe McCarthy	Chicago Cubs (1926–1930); New York Yankees (1931–1946); Boston Red Sox (1948–1950)	1957	18 (6)

== See also ==
- Major League Baseball Centennial All-Time Teams
- Latino Legends Team
- MLB All-Century Team
- DHL Hometown Heroes (2006): the most outstanding player in the history of each MLB franchise, based on on-field performance, leadership quality and character value
- Baseball awards § United States
- Team of the century
- List of MLB awards
- National Baseball Hall of Fame and Museum
