= Desert League =

American independent baseball league

- Upcoming season or competition: 2023
- Sport: Baseball
- Founded: 2016
- First season: 2016
- No. of teams: 4
- Country: United States
- Most recent champion: Yuma Maple Leafs (2016)
- Website: DesertLeague.com

The Desert League of Professional Baseball is an independent baseball league that began in 2016. Unlike other independent leagues, it features a winter schedule also, playing games from September through end of November.

== History ==
Formed with a focus for rookie or first year professional players, the Desert League signed over 100 players to their first professional contracts and completed its inaugural season in 2016. The Desert League was designed as an independent professional league for rookies, and required each team carry a minimum of 12 rookies on their roster. The league had four teams based in California and Arizona. Somerton Cañeros were an affiliate of the Mexican Pacific League club Cañeros de Los Mochis. Some games were played in San Luis, Mexico.

Yuma Maple Leafs were crowned the first league champion on October 28, 2016 sweeping the best-of three championship series with the Imperial County Ghost Riders. After winning Game 1 the previous night in walk-off fashion 4-3 the Maple Leafs took the second game 8-2.

Before the start of the second season the league announced that an agreement had been reached with the California Winter League and the league would suspend operations. Financial terms of the agreement were not disclosed.

On December 20, 2019, league president Luke Powell announced the Desert League would resume play in September of 2021. However operations were suspended again in March 2020 due to the COVID-19 pandemic.

On May 2, 2021, the Desert League announced it would resume operations and play in Fall 2023.

== Teams ==
Team	City	Stadium
Imperial County Ghost Riders	Holtville, California & Calexico, California	Ralph Samaha Park & Rodriguez Park
Somerton Cañeros	Somerton, Arizona	Joe Munoz Field
Yuma Hammers	Yuma, Arizona	Ray Kroc Sports Complex
Yuma Maple Leafs	Yuma, Arizona	Ray Kroc Sports Complex

== Champions ==
Desert League Championship Series
Season	Champions	Runner up	Result
2016	Yuma Maple Leafs	Imperial County Ghost Riders	2-0 (best-of 3)

== See also ==
- Baseball awards #U.S. independent professional leagues
