= Italian Baseball League 2D =

The Italian Baseball League 2nd Division is a professional baseball league in Italy affiliated with the Italian Baseball League 1D. The league used the franchise system, rather than the European-model promotion and relegation

== Teams ==
- Knights Verona (De Angelis Godo)
- Senago Milano Baseball United (Novara United)
- Montepaschi Grosseto (Montepaschi Grosseto)
- Fortitudo Castenaso (Fortitudo Bologna)
- Macerata Angels (T&A San Marino Baseball)
- Junior Parma (Caraparma Parma)
- Danesi Nettuno 2 (Danesi Nettuno B.C.)
- Riccione (Telemarket Rimini)
