= Southeastern Conference baseball awards =

Regional U.S. college baseball awards

At the end of each regular season, the Southeastern Conference names major award winners in baseball. Currently, it names a Coach, Pitcher, Player, and Freshman of the Year. The Coach of the Year award, which dates to 1933, is the oldest. The other three awards were added in the 1990s and early 2000s.

Through the end of the 2014 season, LSU has won 26 major awards, the most of any program. Five other schools have won at least ten: Florida (17), Alabama (16), Ole Miss (11), Vanderbilt (11), and Mississippi State.

== Coach of the Year ==
The Coach of the Year award is given annually to the SEC's best head coach, as chosen by a vote of the conference's coaches. It was first presented in 1933. With the exceptions of 1944 and 1945, it has been presented in each season since then.

== Pitcher of the Year ==
The Pitcher of the Year award is given annually to the SEC's best pitcher, as chosen by a vote of the conference's coaches. It was first presented in 2003.

== Player of the Year ==
The Player of the Year award is given annually to the SEC's best position player, as chosen by a vote of the conference's coaches. It was first presented in 1993. From 1993 to 2002, both pitchers and position players were eligible for it.

== Freshman of the Year ==
The Freshman of the Year award is given annually to the SEC's best freshman, as chosen by a vote of the conference's coaches. It was first presented in 2000. Both pitchers and position players are eligible.

== Scholar-Athlete of the Year ==
The Scholar-Athlete of the Year award is given annually starting in 2000.

== See also ==
- Baseball awards#U.S. college baseball
