= Baseball at the 2013 Canada Summer Games =

Baseball at the 2013 Canada Summer Games was held in Sherbrooke, Quebec at the Stade Amédée Roy, Stade Julien Morin in Coaticook, and Parc de l'Est, in Magog.

The events will be held during the first week between August 3 and 9, 2013.

== Medal table ==
The following is the medal table for cycling at the 2013 Canada Summer Games.

Rank	Nation	Gold	Silver	Bronze	Total
1	British Columbia	1	0	0	1
2	Ontario	0	1	0	1
3	Alberta	0	0	1	1
Totals (3 entries)		1	1	1	3

== Medallists ==
Event	Gold	Silver	Bronze
Men's	British Columbia	Ontario	Alberta

== Results ==
=== Group A ===
Team	W	L	Runs For	Runs Against
British Columbia	5	1	55	17
Ontario	3	3	20	32
Alberta	2	4	24	37
Quebec	2	4	29	42

=== Group B ===
Team	W	L	Runs For	Runs Against
New Brunswick	5	0	36	18
Saskatchewan	4	1	37	20
Manitoba	3	2	40	23
Nova Scotia	2	3	31	35
Newfoundland and Labrador	1	4	13	48
Prince Edward Island	0	5	22	31

=== Playoffs ===
Quarter-final
B2	Saskatchewan	2
A3	Alberta	9

Semi-final
A2	Ontario	3
A3	Alberta	1
A1	British Columbia	7
B1	New Brunswick	0

Final
B1	British Columbia	5
A2	Ontario	0
Third place
B1	New Brunswick	0
A3	Alberta	7

== See also ==
- Baseball awards § Canada
- Events at the 2009 Canada Games § Baseball
