= Portuguese Atlantic Baseball League =

Liga Atlântica de Basebol
- Sport: Baseball
- Founded: 2006
- First season: 2006
- No. of teams: 7
- Country: Portugal
- Continent: Europe
- Website: LAB - LIGA ATLÂNTICA DE BASEBOL

Founded in 2006, the Liga Atlântica de Basebol (Atlantic Baseball League) (LAB) is an active baseball league that operates in the cities of Aveiro, Coimbra, Esposende, Gondomar, Maia, Porto and Vila do Conde. It is the most prolific, organized, and structured baseball league in Portugal currently, and functions as close to professional league baseball as is possible in the country today.

The LAB consists of seven active baseball teams.

- Esposende Raptors
- Villas Vikings
- Porto Buffalos Baseball Club
- Inter Baseball da Maia (Formerly “Lycans”)
- Gondomar-Paredes Highlanders
- University of Aveiro
- Academica Coimbra

The League’s 24-game regular season runs from April to July (pre-season in February and March), and a playoff between the top four teams at the end of the regular season. The league also holds an All Star Game at the end of the regular season, with players being voted in by fans. The All Star game day also features a Home Run Derby for selected LAB players.

LAB Champions:

- 2011 – Aveiro
- 2012 – Lycans
- 2013 – Aveiro
- 2014 - Inter Baseball
- 2015 - Aveiro

== See also ==
- Baseball awards § Portugal
- Baseball awards § Europe
