= Malaysian All-Star League Baseball =

Malaysian All-Star League Baseball (MALB) is a baseball league open to all baseball clubs and associations in Malaysia. The league's operations and management are modeled on the US major leagues (MLB). It is the only sports league in the world that has men and women playing side by side, and against each other.

== Baseball development in Malaysia and in the South East Asian region ==
Baseball was introduced to Malaysia in the mid-1970s when several US based corporations, including Texas Instruments and Smith Kline Beecham, began manufacturing operations in the Keramat Industrial Park in Kuala Lumpur. Most of the plants in operation at the time had a substantial number of American expatriates attached to them, who formally introduced baseball to the Malaysian locals through slow-pitch, fast-pitch and rounder games.

Softball was introduced to Malaysia in the early 1980s, but the game spread more rapidly than baseball, becoming popular in the northern regions of Pulau Pinang, Kedah and Perak, the southern regions of Johor, Melaka and Negeri Sembilan, the eastern regions of Sabah & Sarawak and the East Coast regions of Kelantan, Terengganu and Pahang. It was only in 2001 that baseball formed the Persatuan Besbol Amatur Malaysia, or the Amateur Baseball Association of Malaysia, was formed under founding President Dato' Noh Abdullah.

== MALB History ==
The idea of creating a formal baseball league in Malaysia was first conceptualized in 2005 by two clubs based in Kuala Lumpur, the All-Stars Baseball Club and the Selayang Stars Baseball Club. A formal league was envisioned as a way to provide serious baseball players in Malaysia the opportunity to compete at a more professional level.

The inaugural MALB game was held on February 23, 2006, between Selayang Stars and the Aces of Kepong at the Universiti Kebangsaan Malaysia’s field in Bangi. An inaugural five-month season ensued using a double round-robin format, followed by playoffs. The Patriots Baseball Club, based in Bangsar, a neighborhood of Kuala Lumpur, won the championship in both 2006 and 2007. Each club that joins the MALB must pay participation fees RM600 to RM800 ($180–$240) per team for each season.

For the 2008 season, the MALB restructured the playoffs to include the MALB Asean Series. Under the revised format, the top two teams from the MALB face four other international teams in a tournament culminating in the MALB Asean Series Grand Final. The MALB Asean Series represented a commitment by the MALB organization to develop and promote baseball throughout South East Asia. The MALB has sought to strengthen ties with baseball associations from Asean countries: in 2008, the MALB established a working relationship with the Singapore Baseball & Softball Association, through its Secretary General, Abdu Aziz Talib, and the Garuda Baseball Club of Jakarta, Indonesia. In order to reinforce the MALB's new regional direction after the creation of the Asean Series, league management in 2008 decided to change the league's name from Malaysian All-Star League Baseball to Major Asean League Baseball.

The inaugural MALB Asean Series 2008 was a 4-day, six-team event involving two teams each from Indonesia, Malaysia and Singapore. The teams involved were the Patriots and the Selayang Stars from Malaysia, the Singapore Youth and the Typhoon Baseball Clubs from Singapore, and the Garuda and Eagles Baseball Clubs from Indonesia.

== Baseball federations and associations in Malaysia ==
The national body for baseball in Malaysia is the Baseball Federation of Malaysia, registered with the Olympic Council of Malaysia and the National Sports Council of Malaysia. Under it, comes the state associations, of which, includes the Selangor Baseball Association, Kuala Lumpur Baseball Association, Kedah Baseball Association, Perlis Baseball Association and the Putrajaya Baseball Association.

== Malaysian baseball teams registered with MALB ==
Team	Location
Aces Softball & Baseball Club	Kepong
All-Stars	Damansara, Kuala Lumpur
Cougars	Keramat, Kuala Lumpur
Handoh	Seberang Perai, Penang, Malaysia
KL Yankees Baseball Team	Damansara, Kuala Lumpur
Lions Baseball Team	Puchong
Nazghuls	Damansara, Kuala Lumpur
Pandora	Petaling Jaya
Patriots Baseball Club	Bangsar
Rhynos	Keramat, Kuala Lumpur
Ronins Baseball Team	Kota Damansara
Stars Baseball Club	Selayang
Tigers	Bangsar
Vipers	Seberang Perai
9innings	Mont Kiara

== Other baseball teams within the ASEAN region ==
Team	Location
Dobbermans	Bandung, Indonesia
Eagles Baseball Club	Jakarta, Indonesia
Garuda Baseball Club	Jakarta, Indonesia
Gunners	Bandar Seri Begawan, Brunei
Typhoon Baseball Team	Singapore
X-Men	Singapore

== See also ==
- Baseball awards § Asia
- Baseball awards § Malaysia
