= Big 12 Conference baseball awards =

At the end of each regular season, the Big 12 Conference names major award winners in baseball. Currently, it names a Coach, Pitcher, Player, Freshman, and Newcomer of the Year. With the exception of the Pitcher of the Year award, first given out in 2001, the awards date to the 1997 season, the conference's first.

Through the end of the 2014 season, Texas has won 25 major awards, the most of any program. Two other schools have won at least ten: Nebraska (16) and Texas A&M (14).

Texas Tech is the only program to sweep all the awards in a single season. In 1997, it won all four awards presented.

== Player of the Year ==
The Player of the Year award is given to the conference's best position player. From 1997 to 2000, before the Pitcher of the Year award came into being, both pitcher and position players were eligible for it.

== Freshman of the Year ==
The Freshman of the Year award is given to the conference's best first-year player. From 2000 to 2002 and 2004 to 2005, it was split in the Freshman Player of the Year and Freshman Pitcher of the Year.

== Newcomer of the Year ==
The Newcomer of the Year award is given to the conference's best transfer player. In 2000 and 2001, it was split into the Newcomer Player of the Year and Newcomer Pitcher of the Year.
