= Big Ten Conference baseball awards =

At the end of each regular season, the Big Ten Conference names major award winners in baseball. Currently, it names a Coach, Pitcher, Player, and Freshman of the Year. The Player of the Year award, which dates to 1982, is the oldest. Coach and Freshman of the Year were added in 1988, and Pitcher of the Year was added in 1993.

Through the end of the 2014 season, Ohio State has won 28 major awards, the most of any program. Four other schools have won at least ten: Minnesota (18), Illinois (15), Michigan (15), and Indiana (12).

== Coach of the Year ==
The Coach of the Year award is given annually to the Big Ten's best head coach, as chosen by a vote of the conference's coaches. It was first presented in 1988.

== Pitcher of the Year ==
The Pitcher of the Year award is given annually to the Big Ten's best pitcher, as chosen by a vote of the conference's coaches. It was first presented in 1993.

== Player of the Year ==
The Player of the Year award is given annually to the Big Ten's best position player, as chosen by a vote of the conference's coaches. It was first presented in 1982. From 1982 to 1992, both pitchers and position players were eligible for it.

== Freshman of the Year ==
The Freshman of the Year award is given annually to the Big Ten's best freshman, as chosen by a vote of the conference's coaches. It was first presented in 1988. Both pitchers and position players are eligible.
