= DHL Hometown Heroes =

Promotional event

DHL Hometown Heroes was a 2006 promotional event, sponsored by shipping company DHL, where Major League Baseball (MLB) fans were encouraged to vote for the most outstanding player in the history of each MLB franchise.

Fans were asked to vote for the most outstanding player in the history of each MLB franchise, based on on-field performance, leadership quality and character value. The candidates for the ballot were chosen by the clubs themselves, in conjunction with a blue-ribbon panel of baseball experts, journalists, and historians. The award winners were then chosen, over two months of voting, in a process similar to MLB all-star voting. Votes were cast by fans at every MLB ballpark, as well as online and via cell-phone. In all, nearly 17 million votes were cast.

On September 27, 2006 MLB announced a list of winning players, one from each team.

Of the players awarded, Nolan Ryan was the only player to win the award for two different teams: the Houston Astros and the Texas Rangers.

Three of the honored players were true "hometown heroes" in the sense of starring with MLB teams in or near their actual hometowns. Ryan grew up from infancy in the Houston suburb of Alvin, Texas. Cal Ripken Jr., chosen by Baltimore Orioles fans, was born in Havre de Grace and grew up in Aberdeen, towns in Harford County, Maryland within 45 minutes' drive of Baltimore. Pete Rose, chosen by Cincinnati Reds fans, was born and raised in Cincinnati. (Note that although Jackie Robinson, selected by Los Angeles Dodgers fans, grew up in Pasadena, California, he never played for the franchise in Los Angeles. His entire MLB career was with the Brooklyn Dodgers.)

== Award winners ==
Team	Nominee	Nominee	Nominee	Nominee	Winner	Years	Ref
Angels	Jim Abbott	Don Baylor	Chuck Finley	Tim Salmon	Rod Carew	1979–1985	
Astros	Jeff Bagwell	Craig Biggio	Larry Dierker	Jimmy Wynn	Nolan Ryan	1979–1988	
Athletics	Dennis Eckersley	Lefty Grove	Rickey Henderson	Catfish Hunter	Reggie Jackson	1967–1975, 1987	
Blue Jays	Roberto Alomar	Tony Fernández	Pat Hentgen	Dave Stieb	Joe Carter	1991–1997	
Braves	Chipper Jones	Phil Niekro	John Smoltz	Warren Spahn	Hank Aaron	1954–1974	
Brewers	Cecil Cooper	Rollie Fingers	Jim Gantner	Paul Molitor	Robin Yount	1974–1993	
Cardinals	Lou Brock	Bob Gibson	Albert Pujols	Ozzie Smith	Stan Musial	1941–1944, 1946–1963	
Cubs	Ferguson Jenkins	Ryne Sandberg	Ron Santo	Billy Williams	Ernie Banks	1953–1971	
Devil Rays	Carl Crawford	Roberto Hernández	Aubrey Huff	Fred McGriff	Wade Boggs	1998–1999	
Diamondbacks	Jay Bell	Luis Gonzalez	Todd Stottlemyre	Matt Williams	Randy Johnson	1999–2004, 2007–2008	
Dodgers	Roy Campanella	Sandy Koufax	Pee Wee Reese	Duke Snider	Jackie Robinson	1947–1956	
Giants	Barry Bonds	Juan Marichal	Willie McCovey	Mel Ott	Willie Mays	1951–1952, 1954–1972	
Indians	Earl Averill	Larry Doby	Nap Lajoie	Tris Speaker	Bob Feller	1936–1941, 1945–1956	
Mariners	Jay Buhner	Edgar Martínez	Jamie Moyer	Ichiro Suzuki	Ken Griffey Jr.	1989–1999, 2009–2010	
Marlins	Josh Beckett	Luis Castillo	Jeff Conine	Robb Nen	Dontrelle Willis	2003–2007	
Mets	John Franco	Tug McGraw	Mike Piazza	Darryl Strawberry	Tom Seaver	1967–1977, 1983	
Nationals (Note: Staub and Carter were players for the former Montréal (QC) franchise that became the Nationals in 2005. Because of rules established, no former Washington Senator (before 1971) could have been nominated.)	Liván Hernández	Brian Schneider	Rusty Staub	José Vidro	Gary Carter	1974–1984, 1992	
Orioles	Eddie Murray	Jim Palmer	Brooks Robinson	Frank Robinson	Cal Ripken Jr.	1981–2001	
Padres	Brian Giles	Trevor Hoffman	Randy Jones	Dave Winfield	Tony Gwynn	1982–2001	
Phillies	Richie Ashburn	Steve Carlton	Chuck Klein	Robin Roberts	Mike Schmidt	1972–1989	
Pirates	Ralph Kiner	Bill Mazeroski	Willie Stargell	Honus Wagner	Roberto Clemente	1955–1972	
Rangers	Rusty Greer	Iván Rodríguez	Jim Sundberg	Mark Teixeira	Nolan Ryan	1989–1993	
Red Sox	Roger Clemens	Jim Rice	Carl Yastrzemski	Cy Young	Ted Williams	1939–1942, 1946–1960	
Reds	Johnny Bench	Joe Morgan	Tony Pérez	Frank Robinson	Pete Rose	1963–1978, 1984–1986	
Rockies	Dante Bichette	Vinny Castilla	Andrés Galarraga	Todd Helton	Larry Walker	1995–2004	
Royals	Amos Otis	Bret Saberhagen	Mike Sweeney	Frank White	George Brett	1973–1993	
Tigers	Charlie Gehringer	Hank Greenberg	Al Kaline	Alan Trammell	Ty Cobb	1905–1926	
Twins	Rod Carew	Kent Hrbek	Harmon Killebrew	Tony Oliva	Kirby Puckett	1984–1995	
White Sox	Luke Appling	Harold Baines	Nellie Fox	Minnie Miñoso	Frank Thomas	1990–2005	
Yankees	Yogi Berra	Joe DiMaggio	Lou Gehrig	Mickey Mantle	Babe Ruth	1920–1934	

=== The "Hometown Heroes" panel ===
- Orestes Destrade (ESPN and XM Satellite Radio broadcaster)
- Steve Hirdt (Elias Sports Bureau Executive Vice President)
- Jerome Holtzman (Hall of Fame writers wing official MLB historian)
- Richard C. Levin (Yale University president)
- Dinn Mann (MLB.com editor-in-chief)
- Tim McCarver (Fox Sports broadcaster)
- Jose de Jesus Ortiz (Houston Chronicle writer)
- Harold Reynolds (ESPN broadcaster)
- Ken Shouler (historian and author)
- Claire Smith (The Philadelphia Inquirer assistant sports editor)
- Don Sutton (Washington Nationals broadcaster and Hall of Fame pitcher)

== See also ==
- Baseball awards
- List of Major League Baseball awards
