= Thruway Cup =

Buffalo; Bisons	Rochester; Red Wings	Syracuse; Mets
- Sport: Baseball
- Originated: 1998
- First meeting: April 10, 1998; Rochester vs. Buffalo; North AmeriCare Park
- Current holder: Buffalo Bisons
Buffalo (9); 2000 2001; 2002 2004; 2006 2007; 2012 2013; 2021	Rochester (10); 1998 2003; 2005 2008; 2009 2015; 2016 2017; 2018 2019	Syracuse (4); 1999 2010; 2011 2014
- Bold years denote retired Thruway Cup trophies

Team locations in New York

The Thruway Cup is an annual competition between Minor League Baseball's Buffalo Bisons, Rochester Red Wings, and Syracuse Mets of the International League. The Cup standings are compiled from the games the teams play against each other through the course of the regular season. The team at the top of the standings at the end of the season is crowned the Thruway Cup champion and wins the Thruway Cup trophy. Unique to this competition, it was agreed that any team winning the trophy three times would get to "retire" the cup and keep it as their own. As of the end of the 2021 season, Rochester has won ten times, Buffalo nine times, and Syracuse four times.

The I-90 Thruway Series is the name given to all the games played between the Bisons, Red Wings, and Mets. The series became official when the Bisons joined the International League in 1998 after moving from the Triple-A American Association. The rivalry continued following a move to the Triple-A East in 2021, which rebranded as the International League in 2022.

All of the teams are located in cities along the New York State toll road. Syracuse and Buffalo, which are at the furthest ends are about 150 minutes' driving time from each other, while the other cities are within 90 minutes of each other.

During the 2012 season, an additional IL team made its home along the Thruway, the Empire State Yankees. The Yankees had no home ballpark, so they played their home games at the stadiums of Rochester, Syracuse, Buffalo, and the Batavia Muckdogs (formerly a Class A Short Season team located between Buffalo and Rochester); it was nevertheless not included in the Thruway Cup.

In 2017, the Rochester Red Wings earned the right to keep their retired Thruway Cup trophy, making it the first time a team retired a Cup bearing no other team's name.

No champion was awarded for the 2020 season due to the minor league season being postponed and eventually cancelled on June 30, due to the ongoing COVID-19 pandemic.

For the 2021 season, the Buffalo Bisons temporarily relocated to Trenton, New Jersey, where they played their home games at Trenton Thunder Ballpark. The Bisons' parent club, the Toronto Blue Jays, used Sahlen Field in Buffalo since the 2020 MLB season due to border restrictions brought on by the COVID-19 pandemic. This marked the first time in the history of the rivalry where one of the three teams did not play at its home ballpark along the I-90 Thruway. Buffalo played the season through July in Trenton and moved back to Buffalo in August of that season.

== Winners ==
- 1998: Rochester Red Wings
- 1999: Syracuse SkyChiefs
- 2000: Buffalo Bisons
- 2001: Buffalo Bisons
- 2002: Buffalo Bisons†
- 2003: Rochester Red Wings
- 2004: Buffalo Bisons
- 2005: Rochester Red Wings
- 2006: Buffalo Bisons
- 2007: Buffalo Bisons†
- 2008: Rochester Red Wings
- 2009: Rochester Red Wings
- 2010: Syracuse Chiefs
- 2011: Syracuse Chiefs
- 2012: Buffalo Bisons
- 2013: Buffalo Bisons
- 2014: Syracuse Chiefs†
- 2015: Rochester Red Wings
- 2016: Rochester Red Wings
- 2017: Rochester Red Wings†
- 2018: Rochester Red Wings
- 2019: Rochester Red Wings
- 2020: No champion awarded (COVID-19 pandemic)
- 2021: Buffalo Bisons

†Team won their third Series and is allowed to keep the Thruway Cup

== 2009 ==
Team	W	L	Pct.	GB
x Rochester Red Wings	19	13	.594	---
Syracuse Chiefs	19	13	.594	---
Buffalo Bisons	10	22	.313	6.0

x - Clinched the 2009 Thruway Cup

Rochester won head to head series with Syracuse nine games to seven

== 2010 ==
Team	W	L	Pct.	GB
x Syracuse Chiefs	23	9	.719	---
Buffalo Bisons	17	15	.531	6.0
Rochester Red Wings	8	24	.250	15.0

x - Clinched the 2010 Thruway Cup

On August 30, the Chiefs beat the Bisons 4–1 in 10 innings to claim their second Thruway Cup and first since 1999.

== 2011 ==
Team	W	L	Pct.	GB
x Syracuse Chiefs	19	10	.655	---
Buffalo Bisons	14	17	.452	6.0
Rochester Red Wings	12	18	.000	7.5

x- Clinched the 2011 Thruway Cup

== 2012 ==
Team	W	L	Pct.	GB
x Buffalo Bisons	19	13	.594	---
Syracuse Chiefs	17	15	.531	2.0
Rochester Red Wings	12	20	.375	7.0

x- Clinched the 2012 Thruway Cup

== 2013 ==
Team	W	L	Pct.	GB
x Buffalo Bisons	18	12	.613	---
Rochester Red Wings	15	16	.484	4.0
Syracuse Chiefs	13	17	.433	5.0

x- Clinched the 2013 Thruway Cup

On August 29, the Bisons defeated the Rochester Red Wings, 3–2 to clinch the 2013 Thruway Cup.

== 2014 ==
Team	W	L	Pct.	GB
x Syracuse Chiefs	18	14	.563	---
Buffalo Bisons	17	15	.531	1.0
Rochester Red Wings	13	19	.406	5.0

x- Clinched the 2014 Thruway Cup

On August 31, 2014, the Syracuse Chiefs defeated the Buffalo Bisons, 4–3 to clinch the 2014 Thruway Cup, and claim their fourth Thruway Cup series and first trophy.

== 2015 ==
Team	W	L	Pct.	GB
x Rochester Red Wings	21	14	.600	---
Buffalo Bisons	19	19	.500	3.5
Syracuse Chiefs	16	23	.410	7.0

x- Clinched the 2015 Thruway Cup

== 2016 ==
Team	W	L	Pct.	GB
x Rochester Red Wings	24	14	.632	---
Buffalo Bisons	18	19	.486	5.5
Syracuse Chiefs	14	23	.378	9.5

x- Clinched the 2016 Thruway Cup

== 2017 ==
Team	W	L	Pct.	GB
x Rochester Red Wings	23	11	.676	---
Syracuse Chiefs	15	20	.429	8.5
Buffalo Bisons	14	21	.400	9.5

x- Clinched the 2017 Thruway Cup Series and retired the Thruway Cup.

== 2018 ==
Team	W	L	Pct.	GB
x Rochester Red Wings	19	18	.514	---
Syracuse Chiefs	19	19	.500	½
Buffalo Bisons	17	18	.486	1.0

x - Clinched the 2018 Thruway Cup

== 2019 ==
Team	W	L	Pct.	GB
x Rochester Red Wings	19	17	.528	---
Buffalo Bisons	17	16	.515	0.5
Syracuse Mets	18	19	.486	1.5

x - Clinched the 2019 Thruway Cup

== 2021 ==
Team	W	L	Pct.	GB
x Buffalo Bisons	44	18	.710	---
Syracuse Mets	24	36	.400	18.5
Rochester Red Wings	19	35	.352	20.5

x - Clinched the 2021 Thruway Cup

== Notable players who played for all three teams ==
- Jeff Manto Red Wings 1994; SkyChiefs 1997; Bisons 1997–2000. He won the International League Most Valuable Player Award as a member of the Red Wings in 1994. Manto's number 30 is retired by the Bisons, and he was inducted into the International League Hall of Fame in 2014.
- Darin Mastroianni Red Wings 2012–2014, 2016; Bisons 2014; Chiefs 2015
- Matt Hague Bisons 2014–15; Red Wings 2017; Chiefs 2018. He won the International League Most Valuable Player Award as a member of the Bisons in 2015.
- Tommy Milone Chiefs 2011, 2018; Red Wings 2014–2016; Bisons 2021
- P. J. Walters Red Wings 2012–13; Bisons 2014; Chiefs 2015
- Michael O'Connor Chiefs 2009, Bisons 2010–2011, Red Wings 2013

== See also ==
- Governors' Cup
