= High school baseball in South Korea =

In Korea, high school baseball (Korean: 고등학교 야구) is played at a very high level by students who train year round. Unlike in Japan or the U.S. where nearly every high school fields a team, there are only about 60–70 Korean high school baseball teams which makes the competition tantamount to an all-star league of Korea's young talent. KBO, MLB and NPB scouts are frequently in attendance at all of the five national high school baseball tournaments.

== Competitions ==
=== Five major national tournaments ===
The five Big 5 tournaments are the most important high school baseball events of the year in terms of tradition, prize-money awarded, and public attention.

Five Major National Competitions
Competition	Host city	# of Schools	Start Year
Blue Dragon Flag National High School Baseball Championship	Seoul	36	1946
Golden Lion Flag National High School Baseball Championship	Seoul	36	1947
President's Cup National High School Baseball Tournament	Other cities	41	1967
Grand Phoenix Flag National High School Baseball Tournament	Other cities	63	1971
KBA President's Flag National High School Baseball Tournament	Other cities	63	2013

=== National tournaments hosted by local cities ===
There used to be four lower-level high school baseball events of the year sponsored by local cities. However, these local tournaments have been replaced with the High School Weekend League after the 2010 season.

National Competitions in Local City
Competition	Host city	# of Teams	Start Year
Hwarang Flag National High School Baseball Championship	Busan	24	1949
Daebung Flag National High School Baseball Championship	Daegu	22	1979
Mudeung Flag National High School Baseball Championship	Gwangju	22	1994
Michuhol Flag National High School Baseball Championship	Incheon	22	2003

== See also ==
- Baseball in Korea
- Baseball awards § South Korea
- Baseball awards#U.S. high-school baseball
- Japanese High School Baseball Championship (Summer Koshien)
- National High School Baseball Invitational Tournament championship (Spring Koshien)
