= Atlantic Coast Conference baseball awards =

At the end of each regular season, the Atlantic Coast Conference names major award winners in baseball. Currently, it names a Coach, Pitcher, Player, and Freshman of the Year. The Player of the Year award, which dates to 1969, is the oldest. The others– Coach (1981), Freshman (1991), and Pitcher (2005)– were added later.

Through the end of the 2014 season, Clemson has won 19 major awards, the most of any program. Five other schools have won at least ten: Florida State (17), Georgia Tech (16), North Carolina (16), Virginia (13), and NC State (10).

On four occasions, a school has swept all the major awards given out in a season. No team has done so since the fourth award (Pitcher of the Year) was added in 2005. One team (Clemson in 1995) did so between 1991 and 2004, when three awards were given. Three teams did so between 1981 and 1990, when two awards were given: Wake Forest in 1982, NC State in 1984, and Georgia Tech in 1987.

== Coach of the Year ==
The Coach of the Year award was first presented in 1981. It is given annually to the conference's best head coach, as chosen by a vote of the ACC's coaches.

== Pitcher of the Year ==
The Pitcher of the Year award was first presented in 2005. It is given annually to the conference's best pitcher, as chosen by a vote of the ACC's coaches.

== Player of the Year ==
The Player of the Year award was first presented in 1969. It is given annually to the conference's best position player, as chosen by a vote of the ACC's coaches. From 1969 to 2004, both pitchers and position players were eligible.

== Freshman of the Year ==
The Freshman of the Year award was first presented in 1991. It is given annually to the conference's best freshman pitcher or position player, as chosen by a vote of the ACC's coaches.
