= National Adult Baseball Association =

The National Adult Baseball Association (NABA) is an adult, amateur baseball organization, headquartered in Denver, Colorado. It offers competitive and recreational baseball for players in over 125 leagues in over 40 U.S. states. Over 25,000 player-members participate.

The NABA is organized into groups categorized by age. The largest division of play is the Open Division (18 & Over), but there are also divisions for 25 Wood, 25 Aluminum, 35 Wood, 35 Aluminum, 45 Wood, 45 Aluminum, 50 Wood, 55 Wood, and 60 Wood.

Where participation levels permit, leagues are divided into two or more competitive divisions. These divisions are then classified by experience level. The advanced level (AAA) is typically for players who have 3–4 years of college baseball and/or professional baseball experience. The intermediate level (AA) is generally for the players with high school baseball or some college experience. Finally, the recreational level (A) provides an opportunity for players whose love of the game perhaps exceeds their level of experience.

== World championship series ==
- Phoenix World Championship Series
  - Division championships: 18 Wood, 18AA, 18A, 18 Rookie, 25 Wood, 25 Aluminum, 35 Wood, 35 Aluminum, 45 Wood, 45 Aluminum, 50 Wood, 55 Wood, 60 Wood.
  - Awards:
    - Team Champions: team trophy and NABA World Series championship rings
    - Team Runner-up: team trophy and NABA World Series championship watches
    - Team Pool Champion: team pool trophy
    - Championship Game Gold Glove: individual Gold Glove award for each championship game
    - Championship Game MVP: individual MVP award for each championship game
    - Pool Game MVP: individual Game MVP award in each pool game for both teams
- NABA Women's World Championship Series
  - Awards:
    - Champions: team trophy and NABA World Series commemorative championship medal
    - Runner-up: team trophy and NABA World Series commemorative finalist medal
    - Pool Winner: team pool trophy
    - Championship Game Gold Glove: individual Gold Glove award for each championship game
    - Championship Game MVP: individual MVP award for each championship game
    - Pool Game MVP: individual Game MVP award in each pool game for both teams
- Florida World Championship Series
  - Division championships: 18AA, 18A, 18 Rookie, 18 Open Wood Bat, 25 Rookie, 35 Rookie, 45 Rookie, 55 Rookie
  - Awards:
    - Champions: team trophy and NABA World Series championship rings
    - Runner-up: team trophy and NABA World Series championship watches
    - Pool Winner: team pool trophy
    - Championship Game Gold Glove: individual Gold Glove award for each championship game
    - Championship Game MVP: individual MVP award for each championship game
    - Pool Game MVP: individual Game MVP award in each pool game for both teams

== Tournaments ==
(in chronological order)

- California Kickoff Classic "Wood-Bat"
- Citrus Classic
- Las Vegas Kickoff Classic
- Boricua Caribbean Classic
- Las Vegas Memorial Day Tournament
- Atlantic City Memorial Day Tournament
- Hall of Fame Tournament (Cooperstown)
- Mile High Classic "Wood-Bat" Tournament
- Atlantic City Labor Day Games Tournament
- Slammers Baseball / NABA 18 & Under and 16 & Under High School Showcase Tournament (wood bat)
  - Division championships:
    - 18 & Under (seniors and juniors) – Goodyear, Arizona
    - 16 & Under (sophomores and freshmen) – Glendale, Arizona
  - Awards:
    - Champions: team trophy and individual awards
    - Runner-up: team trophy
    - Championship Game Gold Glove: individual Gold Glove award for each championship game
    - Championship Game MVP: individual MVP award for each championship game
- NABA Over-50 & Over-60 Baseball National "Fun" Tournament
  - Division championships: Over-50 Wood Division, Over-50 Aluminum Division, Over-60 Wood Division
  - Awards:
    - Champions: team trophy and NABA commemorative individual awards
    - Runner-up: team trophy and NABA commemorative individual awards
    - Pool Winner: team pool champion award

== Hall of fame ==
For a list of inductees, see footnote

The NABA Hall of Fame was established in 1999.

== See also ==
- Amateur baseball in the United States
- Baseball awards#U.S. adult and semi-professional baseball
