= Southern Conference baseball awards =

Regional U.S. collebe baseball awards

At the end of each regular season, the Southern Conference names major award winners in baseball. Currently, it names a Coach, Pitcher, Player, and Freshman of the Year. The Coach of the Year award and Player of the Year award, which date to 1972, are the oldest. The others– Freshman (1980), and Pitcher (1989)– were added later.

== Coach of the Year ==
The Coach of the Year award was first presented in 1972. It is given annually to the conference's best head coach, as chosen by a vote of the SoCon's coaches.

== Pitcher of the Year ==
The Pitcher of the Year award was first presented in 1989. It is given annually to the conference's best pitcher, as chosen by a vote of the SoCon's coaches.

== Player of the Year ==
The Player of the Year award was first presented in 1972. It is given annually to the conference's best position player, as chosen by a vote of the SoCon's coaches. From 1969 to 2004, both pitchers and position players were eligible.

== Freshman of the Year ==
The Freshman of the Year award was first presented in 1980. It is given annually to the conference's best freshman pitcher or position player, as chosen by a vote of the SoCon's coaches.
