= Latino Legends Team =

All-time all-star baseball team

The Latino Legends Team was an all-time all-star baseball team selected in 2005 to honor the history of Latin American players in Major League Baseball. The players were chosen by fan voting. Ballots were available both online at MLB.com and at Chevrolet dealerships, and over 1.6 million total votes were cast. The team was announced at a ceremony hosted by actor Edward James Olmos prior to Game Four of the 2005 World Series, a game in which Ozzie Guillen became the first Latino manager to win the series as his White Sox clinched their first title since 1917.

== The team ==
- (Puerto Rico) Iván Rodríguez (catcher)
- (Dominican Republic) Albert Pujols (first base)
- (Panama) Rod Carew (second base)
- (United States) Edgar Martinez (third base)*
- (United States) Alex Rodriguez (shortstop)**
- (Dominican Republic) Manny Ramirez (outfield)**
- (Puerto Rico) Roberto Clemente (outfield)
- (Dominican Republic) Vladimir Guerrero (outfield)
- (Dominican Republic) Pedro Martínez (starting pitcher)
- (Dominican Republic) Juan Marichal (starting pitcher)
- (Mexico) Fernando Valenzuela (starting pitcher)
- (Panama) Mariano Rivera (relief pitcher)

== Controversy ==
Despite being the only native of South America in the Baseball Hall of Fame, Venezuela native Luis Aparicio was not selected. Other significant players not selected were Puerto Ricans Orlando Cepeda, Roberto Alomar and Carlos Delgado, Cubans Minnie Miñoso, Tony Oliva and Tony Pérez, and the Negro leagues star Martín Dihigo.

Dominican Sammy Sosa, a then still-active member of the 500 home run club was left off, as were Rafael Palmeiro and José Canseco, renowned Cuban-born sluggers caught up in the steroid scandals at the time. In February 2009, Latino Legends shortstop Alex Rodriguez was reported to have tested positive for steroid use during Major League Baseball's 2003 survey testing. After the report was released, Rodriguez confessed in an interview with ESPN that he used banned substances between 2001 and 2003. On July 30, 2009, Latino Legends outfielder Manny Ramirez was also reported to have tested positive for performance-enhancing drugs during Major League Baseball's 2003 survey testing.

== See also ==
- Baseball awards § One-time awards
