= List of Major League Baseball awards =

Major League Baseball presents a variety of annual awards and trophies to recognize both its teams and its players. Three team trophies are awarded annually: one each to the National League and American League champions, and one of the champion of the World Series. Additionally, various organizations—such as the Baseball Writers' Association of America (BBWAA) and the Office of the Commissioner of Baseball—present awards for such accomplishments as excellence in batting, pitching performance, fielding prowess, and community service.

The Most Valuable Player Award, commonly known as the "MVP", is the oldest individual award, given in its current format since 1931. MVP awards are also presented for performances in the Major League Baseball All-Star Game, the League Championship Series, and the World Series. Offensive awards include the Silver Slugger Award and the Hank Aaron Award, while the Cy Young Award and Major League Baseball Reliever of the Year Award recognize pitching; the Rawlings Gold Glove Award is given for fielding. The newest award is the All-MLB Team, introduced in 2019 to honor the best players at each position across all of MLB. Before that time, the most recently established awards were the Major League Baseball Reliever of the Year Award and Major League Baseball Comeback Player of the Year Award, both established in 2005. Additionally, the Commissioner, at his discretion, can present an Historic Achievement Award for any great contribution to the sport that he deems worthy.

== Team awards ==
=== Commissioner's Trophy ===
The Commissioner's Trophy is presented each year by the Commissioner of Baseball to the Major League Baseball team that wins the World Series. The World Series is played between the champion clubs of the American League and the National League. The "modern" World Series has been played every year since 1903 with the exception of 1904, which was cancelled when the NL champion New York Giants declined to play the AL champion Boston Americans, and 1994, which was cancelled due to the players' strike.

Baseball has employed various championship formulas since the 1860s. When the term "World Series" is used by itself, it is usually understood to refer to the "modern" World Series exclusively. The World Series championship is determined through a best-of-seven playoff. Best-of-seven has been the format of nearly all of the modern World Series, except 1903 and 1919–1921 which were best-of-nine. In addition to the Commissioner's Trophy, each player on the winning team receives an individual World Series ring. The Commissioner's Trophy has been awarded to the Series winner since 1967.

Recent trophy designs contain flags representing each team in each league. It is the only championship trophy of the four major sports in the United States that is not named after a particular person (contrasting with the National Hockey League's Stanley Cup, the National Football League's Vince Lombardi Trophy, and the National Basketball Association's Larry O'Brien Trophy). The current holders of the trophy are the Milwaukee Brewers of the National League, who won the 2026 World Series.

=== Warren C. Giles Trophy ===
The Warren C. Giles Trophy is presented annually to the champion of the National League. The award is named for Warren Giles, who was league president from 1951 to 1969. Until 2017 the award was passed from champion to champion (like the NHL's Stanley Cup, but unlike the American League) as opposed a new trophy being created each season. Starting in 2017, an identical trophy as the American League trophy was made, and a new trophy is now made each season. Warren's son Bill Giles, the honorary league president and former part-owner of the Philadelphia Phillies, presents the trophy to the National League champion at the conclusion of each National League Championship Series. The Milwaukee Brewers are the current holders of the Giles Trophy after beating the Los Angeles Dodgers the 2026 National League Championship Series.

=== William Harridge Trophy ===
The William Harridge Trophy is the American League's counterpart to the Giles Trophy, and is presented each year to the American League champion. Prior to 2017, the trophy featured a golden eagle, the league's emblem, sitting atop a silver baseball and clutching the American League banner. Since 2017, the trophy is all silver with a pennant on top. The trophy is named for Will Harridge, who was league president from 1931 to 1958. The Tampa Bay Rays are the current holders of the Harridge Trophy after their 2026 American League Championship Series win over the Cleveland Guardians. A new trophy is awarded each season.

== Individual awards ==
=== Most Valuable Player ===
The Most Valuable Player Award (commonly known as the MVP) is an annual award given to one outstanding player in each league of Major League Baseball. The MVP originated in 1910 as the Chalmers Award, sponsored by the Chalmers Automobile Company. Chalmers presented the award until 1914. The National and American Leagues presented their own "League Awards" from 1922 to 1929, after which the BBWAA began to present an unofficial award. Since 1931, it has been officially presented by the BBWAA. It was officially called the Kenesaw Mountain Landis Memorial Baseball Award until 2020, following complaints from past MVP winners about Landis's role in stonewalling racial integration. The most recent award winners are Aaron Judge of the New York Yankees in the American League and Shohei Ohtani of the Los Angeles Dodgers in the National League.

=== Lou Gehrig Memorial Award ===
The Lou Gehrig Memorial Award is given annually to a Major League Baseball (MLB) player who best exhibits the character and integrity of Lou Gehrig, both on the field and off it. The award was created by the Phi Delta Theta fraternity in honor of Gehrig, who was a member of the fraternity at Columbia University. It was first presented in 1955, fourteen years after Gehrig's death. The award's purpose is to recognize a player's exemplary contributions in "both his community and philanthropy." The bestowal of the award is overseen by the headquarters of the Phi Delta Theta in Oxford, Ohio, and the name of each winner is inscribed onto the Lou Gehrig Award plaque in the Baseball Hall of Fame in Cooperstown, New York. It is the only MLB award conferred by a fraternity. The most recent award winner is Bobby Witt Jr. of the Kansas City Royals.

=== Cy Young Award ===
The Cy Young Award is an honor given annually in baseball to the best pitchers in Major League Baseball, one each for the American and National Leagues. The award was first introduced in 1956 by Commissioner Ford Frick in honor of Hall of Fame pitcher Cy Young, who died in 1955. The award was originally given to the single best pitcher in the major leagues, but after Frick's retirement in 1967, the award was given to one pitcher in each league. Each league's award is voted on by members of the Baseball Writers' Association of America, with two representatives from each team. The most recent award winners are Tarik Skubal of the Detroit Tigers in the American League and Paul Skenes of the Pittsburgh Pirates in the National League.

=== Rookie of the Year ===
The Rookie of the Year Award is given annually to one player from each league, as voted upon by the BBWAA. The award was established in 1940 by the Chicago chapter of the BBWAA who alone selected a rookie of the year. Starting in 1947, all members of the national BBWAA organization voted. Jackie Robinson was awarded the first official Rookie of the Year award. The award was originally known as the J. Louis Comiskey Memorial Award, after the Chicago White Sox owner of the 1930s. In 1987, it was renamed the Jackie Robinson Award, in honor of the 40th year since Robinson broke the baseball color line. Only two players, both in the American League, have been named Rookie of the Year and MVP in the same year: Fred Lynn in 1975 and Ichiro Suzuki in 2001. The only Rookie of the Year to win the Cy Young Award in the same year was Fernando Valenzuela in 1981. In 1947 and 1948, only one award was given to a single player. Since 1949, the honor has been given to one player in each league. The most recent award winners are Nick Kurtz of the Athletics in the American League and Drake Baldwin of the Atlanta Braves in the National League.

=== Manager of the Year ===
The Manager of the Year Award is an honor given annually since 1983 to the best managers in the American and National Leagues. The winner is voted on by 30 members of the BBWAA. Each places a vote for first, second, and third place among the managers of each league.^{[a]} The manager with the highest score in each league wins the award. In 1991, Bobby Cox became the first manager to win the award in both leagues, winning with the Atlanta Braves and having previously won with the Toronto Blue Jays in 1985. Tony La Russa, Lou Piniella, and Jim Leyland have since won the award in both leagues. Joe Girardi is the only manager to win the award with a fourth-place team (2006 Florida Marlins); he is also the only manager to win the award after fielding a team with a losing record. The 2025 award winners are Stephen Vogt of the Cleveland Guardians in the American League and Pat Murphy of the Milwaukee Brewers in the National League.

=== All-MLB Team ===
The All-MLB Team, introduced following the 2019 season, honors the best players at each position across all of MLB. A panel consisting of media members, former players, and baseball officials selects the honorees; fan voting is also incorporated into the selection process, with the collective fan vote having the same weight as a single panel member. First and second teams are named, each consisting of one catcher, one player at each infield position, three outfielders regardless of position, five starting pitchers, two relievers, and one designated hitter. The All-MLB Team is announced during the Winter Meetings.

=== Gold Glove ===
The Rawlings Gold Glove Award, usually referred to as the Gold Glove, is the award given annually to the players judged to have exhibited superior individual fielding performances at each fielding position in both the National and American Leagues, as voted by the managers and coaches in each league. Managers are not permitted to vote for their own players. Twenty Gold Gloves are awarded each year: one at each of the nine positions, plus one for a utility player, in each league.

=== Silver Slugger ===
The Silver Slugger Award is awarded annually to the best offensive player at each position in both the American League and the National League, as determined by Major League Baseball's coaches and managers. These voters consider several offensive categories in selecting the winners, including batting average, slugging percentage, and on-base percentage, in addition to "coaches' and managers' general impressions of a player's overall offensive value". As with the Gold Glove, the prize is presented to outfielders irrespective of their specific position, and an additional award is presented to a utility player in each league. Pitchers do not receive a Silver Slugger Award; an award is given to one designated hitter in each league, instead. Prior to 2022, when the designated hitter was permanently allowed across both leagues, a Silver Slugger Award for pitchers was awarded in the National League (except in 2020).

=== Hank Aaron Award ===
The Hank Aaron Award is given annually to the Major League Baseball players selected as the top hitter in each league, as voted on by baseball fans and members of the media. It was introduced in 1999 to commemorate the 25th anniversary of Hank Aaron surpassing Babe Ruth's 714 career home runs. The award was the first major award to be introduced by Major League Baseball in more than 25 years. Each team's radio and television play-by-play broadcasters and color analysts vote for three players in each league. Their first place vote receives five points, the second place vote receives three points, and the third place vote receives one point. Beginning in 2003, fans were given the opportunity to vote via Major League Baseball's website. Fans' votes account for 30% of the points, while broadcasters' and analysts' votes account for the other 70%. The 2025 winners of the Hank Aaron Award are Aaron Judge of the New York Yankees in the American League and Shohei Ohtani of the Los Angeles Dodgers in the National League.

=== Comeback Player of the Year ===
The Comeback Player of the Year Award is presented by MLB to the player who is judged to have "re-emerged on the baseball field during a given season." The award was developed in 2005, as part of a sponsorship agreement between MLB and Viagra. In 2005 and 2006 representatives from MLB and MLB.com selected six candidates each from the AL and NL and one winner for each league was selected via an online poll on MLB.com. Since then, the winners have been selected by a panel of MLB beat reporters. Under the current voting structure, first-place votes are worth five points, second-place votes worth three, and third-place votes worth one, with the award going to the player with the most overall points. The 2025 award winners are Jacob deGrom of the Texas Rangers in the American League and Ronald Acuña Jr. of the Atlanta Braves in the National League.

=== World Series MVP ===
The Willie Mays World Series Most Valuable Player Award is given to the player who most contributes to his team's success in the final round of the Major League Baseball post-season. The award was originally given by the editors of Sport magazine, but is now decided by a combination of media members and Major League Baseball officials. On September 29, 2017, it was renamed in honor of Willie Mays in remembrance of the 63rd anniversary of The Catch. Mays never won the award himself. The 2026 award winner was William Contreras, catcher for the Milwaukee Brewers.

=== League Championship Series MVP ===
The League Championship Series Most Valuable Player (MVP) Award is given annually to the players deemed to have the most impact on their teams' performances in each of the two respective League Championship Series that comprise the penultimate round of the MLB postseason. This series has a best-of-seven playoff format, and currently follows the Division Series. The winners of the National League Championship Series and the American League Championship Series advance to the World Series. The 2025 award winners were Shohei Ohtani of the Los Angeles Dodgers in the National League and Vladimir Guerrero Jr. of the Toronto Blue Jays in the American League.

=== All-Star Game MVP ===
The Major League Baseball All-Star Game Most Valuable Player (MVP) Award is an annual Major League Baseball (MLB) award given to the most outstanding player in each year's MLB All-Star Game. Awarded each season since 1962, it was originally called the "Arch Ward Memorial Award" in honor of Arch Ward, the man who conceived the All-Star Game. The award's name was changed to the "Commissioner's Trophy" in 1970, but this name change was reversed in 1985 when the World Series Trophy was renamed the Commissioner's Trophy. Finally, the trophy was renamed the "Ted Williams Most Valuable Player Award" in 2002, in honor of former Boston Red Sox player Ted Williams, who had died earlier that year. No award was presented for the 2002 All-Star Game, which ended in a tie. In 2003, Garret Anderson of the Anaheim Angels was the first recipient of the newly named Ted Williams Award. The award was not given in 2020 due to the COVID-19 pandemic postponing the 2020 MLB season for over three months, resulting in the 2020 All-Star Game's cancellation. The 2026 award winner was Cody Bellinger of the New York Yankees.

=== Roberto Clemente Award ===
The Roberto Clemente Award is given annually to the MLB player who "best exemplifies the game of baseball, sportsmanship, community involvement and the individual's contribution to his team", as voted on by baseball fans and members of the media. It is named for Hall of Fame outfielder Roberto Clemente. Originally known as the Commissioner's Award, it has been presented by Major League Baseball since 1971. In 1973, the award was renamed after Clemente following his death in a plane crash while delivering supplies to victims of the 1972 Nicaragua earthquake. Each year, a panel of baseball dignitaries selects 1 player from 30 nominees, one from each club. Teams choose their nominee during the regular season, and the winner is announced at the World Series. The player who receives the most votes online via MLB's official website, MLB.com, gets one vote in addition to the votes cast by the panel. Mookie Betts of the Los Angeles Dodgers is the 2025 winner and current holder of the award.

=== Reliever of the Year ===
Major League Baseball has awarded a Reliever of the Year Award for one pitcher in each league since 2014. The 2025 recipients were Aroldis Chapman of the Boston Red Sox in the American League and Edwin Díaz of the New York Mets in the National League.

Previously, MLB awarded a single Delivery Man of the Year Award, for one pitcher in all of MLB, from 2005 through 2013. The Delivery Man award was developed as part of a sponsorship agreement between MLB and package delivery company DHL Express. There was also a Delivery Man of the Month Award issued for each month of the regular season from 2005 from 2013. In 2017, MLB began a Reliever of the Month Award, for one pitcher in each league, issued for each month of the regular season.

=== Edgar Martínez Award ===
The Edgar Martínez Outstanding Designated Hitter Award, commonly referred to as the Edgar Martínez Award and originally known as the Outstanding Designated Hitter Award, has been presented annually to the most outstanding designated hitter in Major League Baseball (MLB) since 1973. It is named for Hall of Fame designated hitter Edgar Martinez. The award is voted on by club beat reporters, broadcasters, and public relations departments. All players with a minimum of 100 at bats at DH are eligible. The Associated Press discontinued the award in 2000, but it was picked up by the Baseball Writers' Association of America, which has administered it since. Until 2019, and in 2021, use of the designated hitter was allowed only in the American League (AL). In 2020 and since 2022, the designated hitter has been allowed in the National League (NL), in addition to the AL. In 2020, Marcell Ozuna of the Atlanta Braves was the first-ever winner of the award from the NL. The 2025 recipient of the annual award was Shohei Ohtani of the Los Angeles Dodgers.

== Other awards ==
=== Commissioner's Historic Achievement ===
The Commissioner's Historic Achievement Award is presented by the Commissioner of Baseball to a group or individual who has made a "major impact on the sport" of baseball. The award consists of a trophy: a gold baseball sitting atop a silver trophy base. The award has been presented thirteen times by Commissioner Bud Selig: eleven times to players, once to a team, and once to a non-player. The award is most often presented for breaking a Major League Baseball record; it has been presented three times to players who broke the single-season home run record (Sammy Sosa, Mark McGwire, and Barry Bonds). Other record-breakers to receive the award include Ichiro Suzuki (hits in a single season), Cal Ripken Jr. (consecutive games played), Rickey Henderson (career stolen bases and career runs scored) and Mariano Rivera (career saves, both regular season and postseason; postseason ERA). The most recent recipient is Shohei Ohtani in 2021.

=== MLB Lifetime Pass ===
The MLB Lifetime Pass is a pass gifted to players, managers, coaches, umpires, and league executives, and various other people of special interest which grants them lifetime attendance to any regular season game for the remainder of their life. It also allows one guest per entry and is non-transferable. Generally, the pass is given when a player or coach spends a minimum 8 years in the league or when an executive spends at least 25 years. In addition, some people not involved with MLB have been given passes based on their merits in other areas. Most notably of which was President Theodore Roosevelt, who was the first to ever receive such as pass in 1907. Modern passes are a gold-colored alloy card with the recipients name pressed at the bottom.

== See also ==
- Baseball awards
- Bob Feller Act of Valor Award
- National Baseball Hall of Fame and Museum
  - List of members of the Baseball Hall of Fame
- List of Major League Baseball retired numbers
