= Cy Young Award =

Major League Baseball pitching award

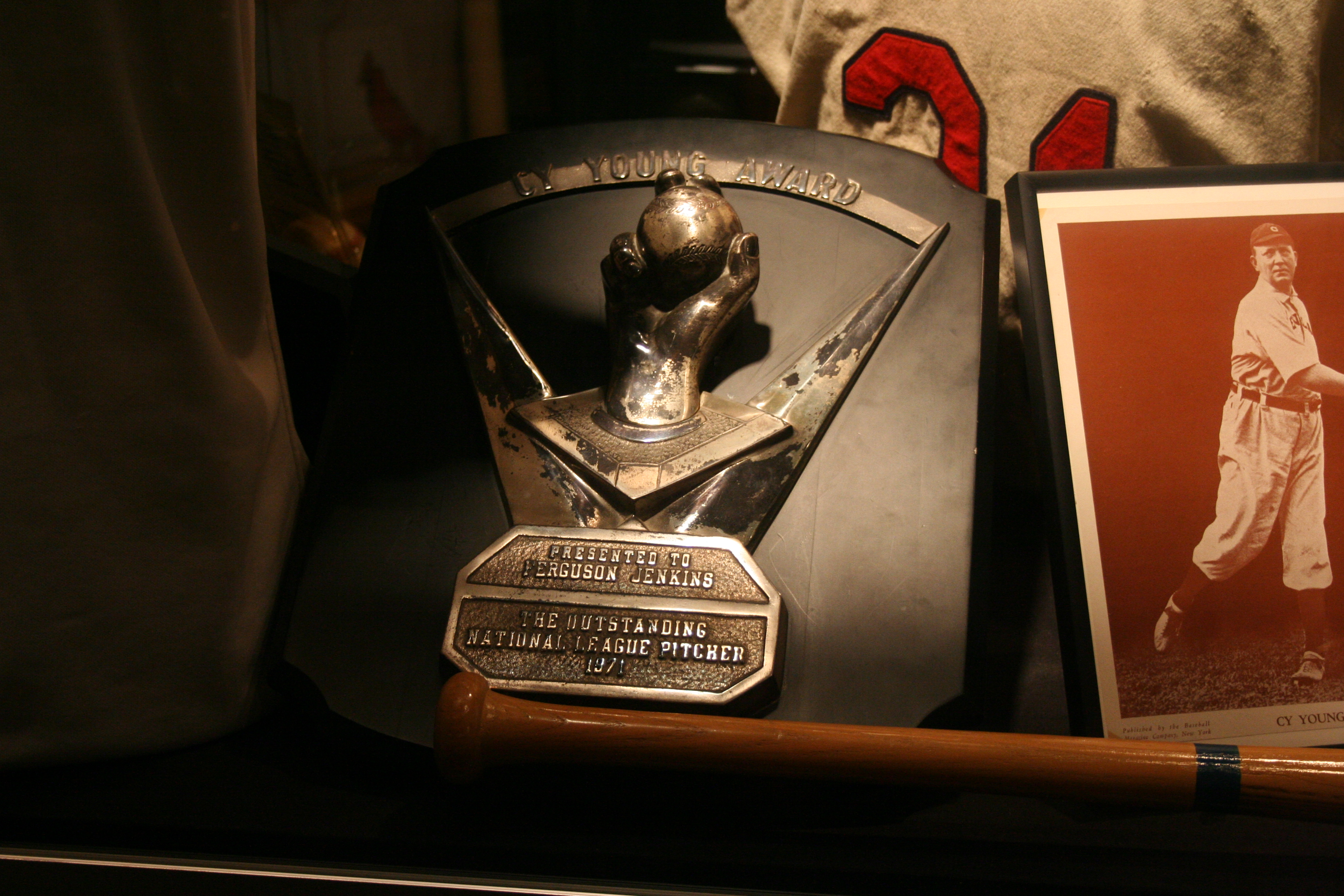
- The 1971 Cy Young Award won by Ferguson Jenkins, on display in the Canadian Baseball Hall of Fame
- Sport: Baseball
- League: Major League Baseball
- Awarded for: Best regular season pitcher in American League and National League
- Country: United States, Canada
- Presented by: Baseball Writers' Association of America

History
- First award: 1956 (Don Newcombe)
- Most wins: Roger Clemens (7)
- Most recent: Jacob Misiorowski (NL); Cam Schlittler (AL)

The Cy Young Award, officially the Cy Young Memorial Award, is given annually to the best pitchers in Major League Baseball (MLB), one each for the American League (AL) and National League (NL). The award was introduced in 1956 by Baseball Commissioner Ford C. Frick in honor of Hall of Fame pitcher Cy Young, who died in 1955. The award was originally given to the single best pitcher in the major leagues, but in 1967, after the retirement of Frick, the award was given to one pitcher in each league.

Each league's award is voted on by members of the Baseball Writers' Association of America (BBWAA). Local BBWAA chapter chairmen in each MLB city recommend two writers to vote for each award. Final approval comes from the BBWAA national secretary-treasurer. Writers vote for either the American League or National League awards, depending on the league in which their local team plays. A total of 30 writers vote for each league's awards. Writers cast their votes prior to the start of postseason play.

As of the 2010 season, each voter places a vote for first, second, third, fourth, and fifth place among the pitchers of each league. The formula used to calculate the final scores is a weighted sum of the votes.^{[A]} The pitcher with the highest score in each league wins the award. If two pitchers receive the same number of votes, the award is shared. From 1970 to 2009, writers voted for three pitchers, with the formula of five points for a first-place vote, three for a second-place vote and one for a third-place vote. Before 1970, writers only voted for the best pitcher and used a formula of one point per vote.

== History ==
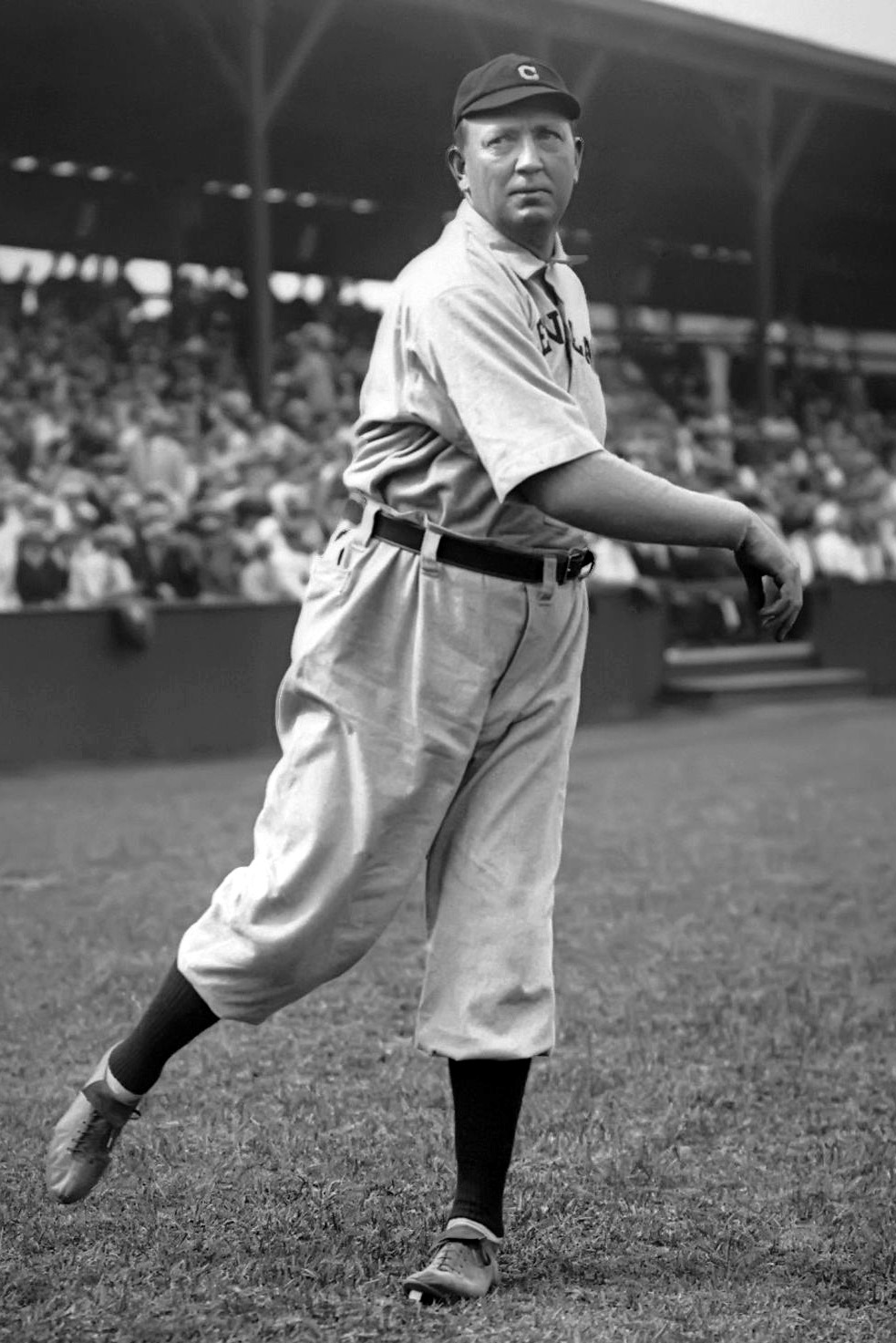
Cy Young, for whom the award is named.

The Cy Young Award was introduced in 1956 by Commissioner of Baseball Ford C. Frick in honor of Hall of Fame pitcher Cy Young, who died in 1955. Originally given to the single best pitcher in the major leagues, the award changed its format over time. From 1956 to 1966, the award was given to one pitcher in Major League Baseball. After Frick retired in 1967, William Eckert became the new Commissioner of Baseball. Due to fan requests, Eckert announced that the Cy Young Award would be given out both in the American League and the National League. From 1956 to 1958, a pitcher was not allowed to win the award on more than one occasion; this rule was eliminated in 1959. After a tie in the 1969 voting for the Cy Young Award, the process was changed, in which each writer was to vote for three pitchers: the first-place vote received five points, the second-place vote received three points, and the third-place vote received one point.

The first recipient of the Cy Young Award was Don Newcombe of the Dodgers. The Dodgers are the franchise with the most Cy Young Awards. In 1957, Warren Spahn became the first left-handed pitcher to win the award. In 1963, Sandy Koufax became the first pitcher to win the award in a unanimous vote; two years later he became the first multiple winner. In 1978, Gaylord Perry (age 40) became the oldest pitcher to receive the award, a record that stood until broken in 2004 by Roger Clemens (age 42). The youngest recipients were Dwight Gooden (age 20 in 1985) and Fernando Valenzuela. In 2012, R. A. Dickey became the first knuckleball pitcher to win the award.

In 1974, Mike Marshall became the first relief pitcher to win the award. In 1992, Dennis Eckersley was the first modern closer (first player to be used almost exclusively in ninth-inning situations) to win the award. Since then only one other relief pitcher has won the award, Éric Gagné in 2003 (also a closer). Nine relief pitchers have won the Cy Young Award across both leagues.

Steve Carlton in 1982 became the first pitcher to win more than three Cy Young Awards, while Greg Maddux in 1994 became the first to win at least three in a row (and received a fourth straight the following year), a feat later repeated by Randy Johnson.

== Winners ==
Key
Year	Each year is linked to an article about that Major League Baseball season.
ERA	Earned run average
(#)	Number of wins by pitchers who have won the award multiple times
*	Also named Most Valuable Player (11 occurrences as of 2025)
**	Also named Rookie of the Year (1 occurrence as of 2025, by Fernando Valenzuela)
†	Member of the National Baseball Hall of Fame and Museum (22 individuals as of 2025)

=== Major Leagues combined (1956–1966) ===
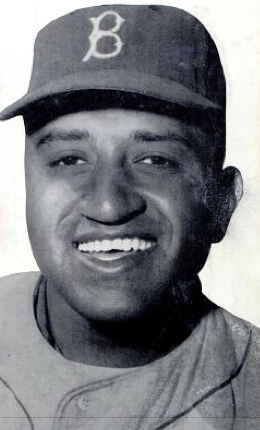
Don Newcombe, the first winner

Year	Pitcher	Team	Record^{[B]}	Saves^{[C]}	ERA	Ks
1956	Don Newcombe*	Brooklyn Dodgers (NL)	27–7	0	3.06	139
1957	Warren Spahn^{†}	Milwaukee Braves (NL)	21–11	3	2.69	111
1958	Bob Turley	New York Yankees (AL)	21–7	1	2.97	168
1959	Early Wynn^{†}	Chicago White Sox (AL)	22–10	0	3.17	179
1960	Vern Law	Pittsburgh Pirates (NL)	20–9	0	3.08	120
1961	Whitey Ford^{†}	New York Yankees (AL)	25–4	0	3.21	209
1962	Don Drysdale^{†}	Los Angeles Dodgers (NL)	25–9	1	2.84	232
1963	Sandy Koufax*^{†}	Los Angeles Dodgers (NL)	25–5	0	1.88	306
1964	Dean Chance	Los Angeles Angels (AL)	20–9	4	1.65	207
1965	Sandy Koufax^{†} (2)	Los Angeles Dodgers (NL)	26–8	2	2.04	382
1966	Sandy Koufax^{†} (3)	Los Angeles Dodgers (NL)	27–9	0	1.73	317

=== American League (1967–present) ===
Cam Schlittler the 2026 AL winner

Year	Pitcher	Team	Record^{[B]}	Saves^{[C]}	ERA	Ks
1967	Jim Lonborg	Boston Red Sox	22–9	0	3.16	246
1968	Denny McLain*	Detroit Tigers	31–6	0	1.96	280
1969	Mike Cuellar	Baltimore Orioles	23–11	0	2.38	182
1969	Denny McLain (2)	Detroit Tigers	24–9	0	2.80	181
1970	Jim Perry	Minnesota Twins	24–12	0	3.04	168
1971	Vida Blue*	Oakland Athletics	24–8	0	1.82	301
1972	Gaylord Perry^{†}	Cleveland Indians	24–16	1	1.92	234
1973	Jim Palmer^{†}	Baltimore Orioles	22–9	1	2.40	168
1974	Catfish Hunter^{†}	Oakland Athletics	25–12	0	2.49	143
1975	Jim Palmer^{†} (2)	Baltimore Orioles	23–11	1	2.09	193
1976	Jim Palmer^{†} (3)	Baltimore Orioles	22–13	0	2.51	159
1977	Sparky Lyle	New York Yankees	13–5	26	2.17	68
1978	Ron Guidry	New York Yankees	25–3	0	1.74	248
1979	Mike Flanagan	Baltimore Orioles	23–9	0	3.08	190
1980	Steve Stone	Baltimore Orioles	25–7	0	3.23	149
1981	Rollie Fingers*^{†}	Milwaukee Brewers	6–3	28	1.04	61
1982	Pete Vuckovich	Milwaukee Brewers	18–6	0	3.34	105
1983	LaMarr Hoyt	Chicago White Sox	24–10	0	3.66	148
1984	Willie Hernández*	Detroit Tigers	9–3	32	1.92	112
1985	Bret Saberhagen	Kansas City Royals	20–6	0	2.87	158
1986	Roger Clemens*	Boston Red Sox	24–4	0	2.48	238
1987	Roger Clemens (2)	Boston Red Sox	20–9	0	2.97	256
1988	Frank Viola	Minnesota Twins	24–7	0	2.64	193
1989	Bret Saberhagen (2)	Kansas City Royals	23–6	0	2.16	193
1990	Bob Welch	Oakland Athletics	27–6	0	2.95	127
1991	Roger Clemens (3)	Boston Red Sox	18–10	0	2.62	241
1992	Dennis Eckersley*^{†}	Oakland Athletics	7–1	51	1.91	93
1993	Jack McDowell	Chicago White Sox	22–10	0	3.37	158
1994	David Cone	Kansas City Royals	16–5	0	2.94	132
1995	Randy Johnson^{†}	Seattle Mariners	18–2	0	2.48	294
1996	Pat Hentgen	Toronto Blue Jays	20–10	0	3.22	177
1997	Roger Clemens (4)	Toronto Blue Jays	21–7	0	2.05	292
1998	Roger Clemens (5)	Toronto Blue Jays	20–6	0	2.65	271
1999	Pedro Martínez^{†} (2)	Boston Red Sox	23–4	0	2.07	313
2000	Pedro Martínez^{†} (3)	Boston Red Sox	18–6	0	1.74	284
2001	Roger Clemens (6)	New York Yankees	20–3	0	3.51	213
2002	Barry Zito	Oakland Athletics	23–5	0	2.75	182
2003	Roy Halladay^{†}	Toronto Blue Jays	22–7	0	3.25	204
2004	Johan Santana	Minnesota Twins	20–6	0	2.61	265
2005	Bartolo Colón	Los Angeles Angels of Anaheim	21–8	0	3.48	157
2006	Johan Santana (2)	Minnesota Twins	19–6	0	2.77	265
2007	CC Sabathia^{†}	Cleveland Indians	19–7	0	3.21	209
2008	Cliff Lee	Cleveland Indians	22–3	0	2.54	170
2009	Zack Greinke	Kansas City Royals	16–8	0	2.16	242
2010	Félix Hernández	Seattle Mariners	13–12	0	2.27	232
2011	Justin Verlander*	Detroit Tigers	24–5	0	2.40	250
2012	David Price	Tampa Bay Rays	20–5	0	2.56	205
2013	Max Scherzer	Detroit Tigers	21–3	0	2.90	240
2014	Corey Kluber	Cleveland Indians	18–9	0	2.44	269
2015	Dallas Keuchel	Houston Astros	20–8	0	2.48	216
2016	Rick Porcello	Boston Red Sox	22–4	0	3.15	189
2017	Corey Kluber (2)	Cleveland Indians	18–4	0	2.25	265
2018	Blake Snell	Tampa Bay Rays	21–5	0	1.89	221
2019	Justin Verlander (2)	Houston Astros	21–6	0	2.58	300
2020	Shane Bieber	Cleveland Indians	8–1	0	1.63	122
2021	Robbie Ray	Toronto Blue Jays	13–7	0	2.84	248
2022	Justin Verlander (3)	Houston Astros	18–4	0	1.75	185
2023	Gerrit Cole	New York Yankees	15–4	0	2.63	222
2024	Tarik Skubal	Detroit Tigers	18–4	0	2.39	228
2025	Tarik Skubal (2)	Detroit Tigers	13–6	0	2.21	241
2026	Cam Schlittler	New York Yankees	14–6	0	1.95	239

=== National League (1967–present) ===
Jacob Misiorowski, 2026 NL winner

Year	Pitcher	Team	Record^{[B]}	Saves^{[C]}	ERA	Ks
1967	Mike McCormick	San Francisco Giants	22–10	0	2.85	150
1968	Bob Gibson*^{†}	St. Louis Cardinals	22–9	0	1.12	268
1969	Tom Seaver^{†}	New York Mets	25–7	0	2.21	208
1970	Bob Gibson^{†} (2)	St. Louis Cardinals	23–7	0	3.12	274
1971	Ferguson Jenkins^{†}	Chicago Cubs	24–13	0	2.77	263
1972	Steve Carlton^{†}	Philadelphia Phillies	27–10	0	1.98	310
1973	Tom Seaver^{†} (2)	New York Mets	19–10	0	2.08	251
1974	Mike Marshall	Los Angeles Dodgers	15–12	21	2.42	143
1975	Tom Seaver^{†} (3)	New York Mets	22–9	0	2.38	243
1976	Randy Jones	San Diego Padres	22–14	0	2.74	93
1977	Steve Carlton^{†} (2)	Philadelphia Phillies	23–10	0	2.64	198
1978	Gaylord Perry^{†} (2)	San Diego Padres	21–6	0	2.73	154
1979	Bruce Sutter^{†}	Chicago Cubs	6–6	37	2.22	110
1980	Steve Carlton^{†} (3)	Philadelphia Phillies	24–9	0	2.34	286
1981	Fernando Valenzuela**	Los Angeles Dodgers	13–7	0	2.48	180
1982	Steve Carlton^{†} (4)	Philadelphia Phillies	23–11	0	3.11	286
1983	John Denny	Philadelphia Phillies	19–6	0	2.37	139
1984	Rick Sutcliffe	Chicago Cubs	16–1	0	2.69	155
1985	Dwight Gooden	New York Mets	24–4	0	1.53	268
1986	Mike Scott	Houston Astros	18–10	0	2.22	306
1987	Steve Bedrosian	Philadelphia Phillies	5–3	40	2.83	74
1988	Orel Hershiser	Los Angeles Dodgers	23–8	1	2.26	178
1989	Mark Davis	San Diego Padres	4–3	44	1.85	92
1990	Doug Drabek	Pittsburgh Pirates	22–6	0	2.76	131
1991	Tom Glavine^{†}	Atlanta Braves	20–11	0	2.55	192
1992	Greg Maddux^{†}	Chicago Cubs	20–11	0	2.18	199
1993	Greg Maddux^{†} (2)	Atlanta Braves	20–10	0	2.36	197
1994	Greg Maddux^{†} (3)	Atlanta Braves	16–6	0	1.56	156
1995	Greg Maddux^{†} (4)	Atlanta Braves	19–2	0	1.63	181
1996	John Smoltz^{†}	Atlanta Braves	24–8	0	2.94	276
1997	Pedro Martínez^{†}	Montreal Expos	17–8	0	1.90	305
1998	Tom Glavine^{†} (2)	Atlanta Braves	20–6	0	2.47	157
1999	Randy Johnson^{†} (2)	Arizona Diamondbacks	17–9	0	2.49	364
2000	Randy Johnson^{†} (3)	Arizona Diamondbacks	19–7	0	2.64	347
2001	Randy Johnson^{†} (4)	Arizona Diamondbacks	21–6	0	2.49	372
2002	Randy Johnson^{†} (5)	Arizona Diamondbacks	24–5	0	2.32	334
2003	Éric Gagné	Los Angeles Dodgers	2–3	55	1.20	137
2004	Roger Clemens (7)	Houston Astros	18–4	0	2.98	218
2005	Chris Carpenter	St. Louis Cardinals	21–5	0	2.83	213
2006	Brandon Webb	Arizona Diamondbacks	16–8	0	3.10	178
2007	Jake Peavy	San Diego Padres	19–6	0	2.54	240
2008	Tim Lincecum	San Francisco Giants	18–5	0	2.62	265
2009	Tim Lincecum (2)	San Francisco Giants	15–7	0	2.48	261
2010	Roy Halladay^{†} (2)	Philadelphia Phillies	21–10	0	2.44	219
2011	Clayton Kershaw	Los Angeles Dodgers	21–5	0	2.28	248
2012	R. A. Dickey	New York Mets	20–6	0	2.73	230
2013	Clayton Kershaw (2)	Los Angeles Dodgers	16–9	0	1.83	232
2014	Clayton Kershaw* (3)	Los Angeles Dodgers	21–3	0	1.77	239
2015	Jake Arrieta	Chicago Cubs	22–6	0	1.77	236
2016	Max Scherzer (2)	Washington Nationals	20–7	0	2.96	284
2017	Max Scherzer (3)	Washington Nationals	16–6	0	2.51	268
2018	Jacob deGrom	New York Mets	10–9	0	1.70	269
2019	Jacob deGrom (2)	New York Mets	11–8	0	2.43	255
2020	Trevor Bauer	Cincinnati Reds	5–4	0	1.73	100
2021	Corbin Burnes	Milwaukee Brewers	11–5	0	2.43	234
2022	Sandy Alcántara	Miami Marlins	14–9	0	2.28	207
2023	Blake Snell (2)	San Diego Padres	14–9	0	2.25	234
2024	Chris Sale	Atlanta Braves	18–3	0	2.38	225
2025	Paul Skenes	Pittsburgh Pirates	10–10	0	1.97	216
2026	Jacob Misiorowski	Milwaukee Brewers	16–5	0	1.80	252

=== Multiple winners ===
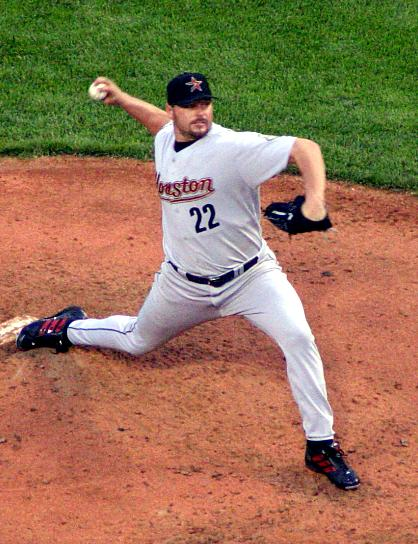
With 7, Roger Clemens has the most Cy Young Awards.

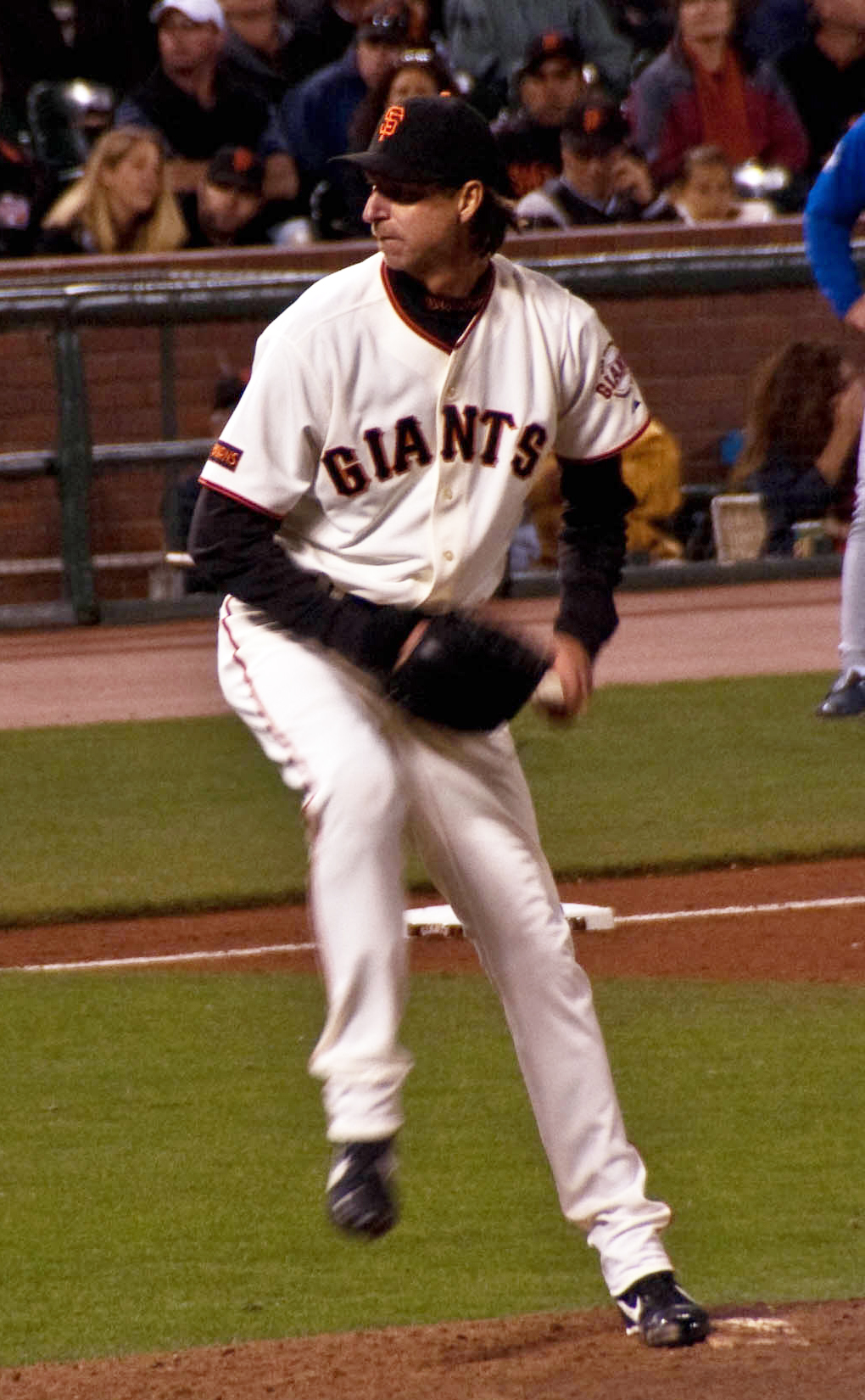
Randy Johnson, five-time Cy Young Award winner.

Twenty-three (23) pitchers have won the award multiple times. Roger Clemens has won the most Cy Young Awards, with seven. His first and last wins were 18 years apart. Greg Maddux (1992–1995) and Randy Johnson (1999–2002) share the record for the most consecutive awards won, with four. Clemens, Johnson, Pedro Martínez, Gaylord Perry, Roy Halladay, Max Scherzer, and Blake Snell are the only pitchers to win the award in both leagues. Sandy Koufax is the only pitcher to win multiple awards during the period when only one award was presented for all of MLB. Roger Clemens was the youngest pitcher to win a second Cy Young Award, while Tim Lincecum is the youngest pitcher to do so in the National League, and Clayton Kershaw is the youngest left-hander to do so. Kershaw is the youngest pitcher to win a third Cy Young Award. Clemens is also the only pitcher to win the award with four different teams; nobody else has done so with more than two different teams. Justin Verlander has the most seasons separating his first (2011) and second (2019) Cy Young Awards.

Pitcher	# of Awards	Years
Roger Clemens	7	1986, 1987, 1991, 1997, 1998, 2001, 2004
Randy Johnson ^{†}	5	1995, 1999, 2000, 2001, 2002
Steve Carlton ^{†}	4	1972, 1977, 1980, 1982
Greg Maddux ^{†}	4	1992, 1993, 1994, 1995
Sandy Koufax ^{†}	3	1963, 1965, 1966
Tom Seaver ^{†}	3	1969, 1973, 1975
Jim Palmer ^{†}	3	1973, 1975, 1976
Pedro Martínez ^{†}	3	1997, 1999, 2000
Clayton Kershaw	3	2011, 2013, 2014
Max Scherzer	3	2013, 2016, 2017
Justin Verlander	3	2011, 2019, 2022
Denny McLain	2	1968, 1969
Bob Gibson ^{†}	2	1968, 1970
Gaylord Perry ^{†}	2	1972, 1978
Bret Saberhagen	2	1985, 1989
Tom Glavine ^{†}	2	1991, 1998
Johan Santana	2	2004, 2006
Tim Lincecum	2	2008, 2009
Roy Halladay ^{†}	2	2003, 2010
Corey Kluber	2	2014, 2017
Jacob deGrom	2	2018, 2019
Blake Snell	2	2018, 2023
Tarik Skubal	2	2024, 2025

=== Wins by teams ===
Only two teams have never had a pitcher win the Cy Young Award. The Brooklyn/Los Angeles Dodgers have won more than any other team with 12.

Team	# of Awards	Years
Brooklyn/Los Angeles Dodgers	12	1956, 1962, 1963, 1965, 1966, 1974, 1981, 1988, 2003, 2011, 2013, 2014
Milwaukee/Atlanta Braves	8	1957, 1991, 1993–1996, 1998, 2024
Detroit Tigers	7	1968, 1969, 1984, 2011, 2013, 2024, 2025
Philadelphia Phillies	7	1972, 1977, 1980, 1982, 1983, 1987, 2010
Boston Red Sox	7	1967, 1986, 1987, 1991, 1999, 2000, 2016
New York Yankees	7	1958, 1961, 1977, 1978, 2001, 2023, 2026
New York Mets	7	1969, 1973, 1975, 1985, 2012, 2018, 2019
Baltimore Orioles	6	1969, 1973, 1975, 1976, 1979, 1980
Cleveland Indians	6	1972, 2007, 2008, 2014, 2017, 2020
Arizona Diamondbacks	5	1999–2002, 2006
Oakland Athletics	5	1971, 1974, 1990, 1992, 2002
Chicago Cubs	5	1971, 1979, 1984, 1992, 2015
Toronto Blue Jays	5	1996–1998, 2003, 2021
Houston Astros	5	1986, 2004, 2015, 2019, 2022
San Diego Padres	5	1976, 1978, 1989, 2007, 2023
Kansas City Royals	4	1985, 1989, 1994, 2009
Milwaukee Brewers	4	1981, 1982, 2021, 2026
Minnesota Twins	4	1970, 1988, 2004, 2006
Chicago White Sox	3	1959, 1983, 1993
Pittsburgh Pirates	3	1960, 1990, 2025
San Francisco Giants	3	1967, 2008, 2009
St. Louis Cardinals	3	1968, 1970, 2005
Montreal Expos/Washington Nationals	3	1997, 2016, 2017
Los Angeles Angels	2	1964, 2005
Seattle Mariners	2	1995, 2010
Tampa Bay Rays	2	2012, 2018
Cincinnati Reds	1	2020
Miami Marlins	1	2022
Colorado Rockies	0	none
Texas Rangers	0	none

=== Unanimous winners ===
There have been 24 players who unanimously won the Cy Young Award, for a total of 31 wins.

Six of these unanimous wins were accompanied by a win of the Most Valuable Player award (marked with * below; ** denotes that the player's unanimous win was accompanied by a unanimous win of the MVP Award).

In the National League, 14 players have unanimously won the Cy Young Award, for a total of 17 wins.

- Sandy Koufax (1963*, 1965, 1966)
- Greg Maddux (1994, 1995)
- Bob Gibson (1968*)
- Steve Carlton (1972)
- Rick Sutcliffe (1984)
- Dwight Gooden (1985)
- Orel Hershiser (1988)
- Randy Johnson (2002)
- Jake Peavy (2007)
- Roy Halladay (2010)
- Clayton Kershaw (2014*)
- Sandy Alcántara (2022)
- Paul Skenes (2025)
- Jacob Misiorowski (2026)

In the American League, 10 players have unanimously won the Cy Young Award, for a total of 14 wins.

- Denny McLain (1968**)
- Ron Guidry (1978)
- Roger Clemens (1986*, 1998)
- Pedro Martínez (1999, 2000)
- Johan Santana (2004, 2006)
- Justin Verlander (2011*, 2022)
- Shane Bieber (2020)
- Gerrit Cole (2023)
- Tarik Skubal (2024)
- Cam Schlittler (2026)

== See also ==
- Triple Crown (pitching)
- Pitcher of the Month
- Major League Baseball Reliever of the Year Award
  - also known as the Mariano Rivera AL Reliever of the Year Award and Trevor Hoffman NL Reliever of the Year Award
- Esurance MLB Awards Best Pitcher (in MLB)
- Baseball Digest Pitcher of the Year (in MLB)
- Players Choice Awards Outstanding Pitcher (in each league)
- Sporting News Starting Pitcher (in each league)
- Baseball Prospectus Internet Baseball Awards Pitcher of the Year (in each league)
- NLBM Wilbur "Bullet" Rogan Legacy Award ("Pitchers of the Year") (in each league)
- Sporting News Relief Pitcher of the Year (in each league)
- NLBM Hilton Smith Legacy Award ("Relievers of the Year") (in each league)
- TSN Reliever of the Year (in each league) (discontinued)
- Rolaids Relief Man Award (in each league) (discontinued)
- Warren Spahn Award (best left-handed pitcher)
- Major League Baseball All-Century Team
- Major League Baseball All-Time Team
- "Pitching Wall of Great Achievement" (in the Ted Williams Museum and Hitters Hall of Fame)
- Eiji Sawamura Award (top starting pitcher in NPB)
- Choi Dong-won Award (top starting pitcher in KBO)
- Baseball awards

== Notes ==
- ^{A} The formula is: Score = 7F + 4S + 3T + 2FO + FI, where F is the number of first-place votes, S is second-place votes, T is third-place votes, FO is fourth-place votes and FI is fifth-place votes.
- ^{a} ^{b} ^{c} See: Decision (baseball)
- ^{a} ^{b} ^{c} In baseball, a save is credited to a pitcher who finishes a game for the winning team under certain prescribed circumstances. It became an official statistic in Major League Baseball in 1969.
