= Legacy Award =

Legacy Award(s) may refer to:

- Bruce Prentice Legacy Award, an award presented by the Ontario Sports Hall of Fame
- Children's Literature Legacy Award, a prize awarded by the Association for Library Service to Children
- Hurston/Wright Legacy Award, a program that honors Black writers, hosted and organized by the Hurston/Wright Foundation
- Legacy Awards (NLBM), a series of awards presented annually by the Negro Leagues Baseball Museum
