= All-Star Futures Game =

Annual baseball exhibition game

- Frequency: Annual
- Location: Varies (see prose)
- Inaugurated: July 11, 1999, Fenway Park, Boston, Massachusetts
- Most recent: July 12, 2026, Citizens Bank Park, Philadelphia, Pennsylvania
- Participants: Minor League Baseball players
- Organizer: Major League Baseball
- Website: Official website

The All-Star Futures Game is an annual baseball exhibition game hosted by Major League Baseball (MLB) in conjunction with the mid-summer MLB All-Star Game. A team of American League-affiliated prospects competes against a team of National League-affiliated prospects. From the inaugural 1999 event through 2018, teams of prospects from the United States faced off against teams of prospects from other countries.

== Origins ==
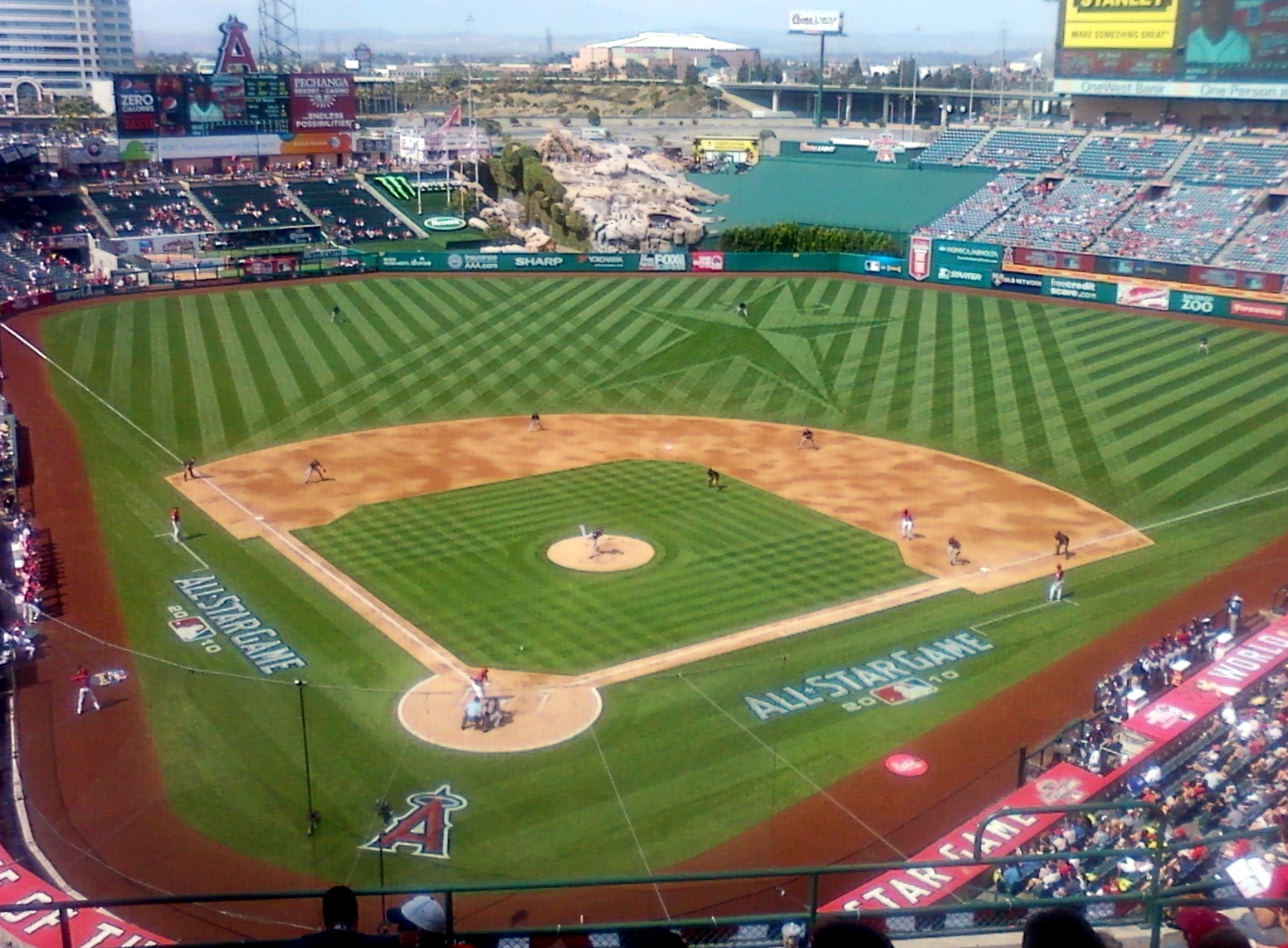
The 2010 XM All-Star Futures Game at Angel Stadium of Anaheim

The Futures Game was conceived by Jimmie Lee Solomon, an Executive Vice President of Baseball Operations for Major League Baseball, looking for an event to showcase the minor leagues and round out the All-Star week festivities. Early versions of the game created marginal interest in the baseball community, but the event has attracted more attention in later years.

== Format ==
Rosters are selected by a joint committee consisting of people from Major League Baseball, MLB.com, and Baseball America magazine. All 30 MLB organizations are represented, with up to two players from any organization and 25 players per team. One team is made up of prospects from American League organizations and the other of National League prospects. From 1999 to 2018, teams were divided into U.S. and World teams based on place of birth. Any player selected to the All-Star Futures Game but promoted to the majors prior to the game is replaced.

Players born in Puerto Rico were part of the World team despite being U.S. citizens by birth, because that territory has its own national baseball federation and national team.

The game is played by the same rules listed in the Official Baseball Rules published by Major League Baseball. Exceptions are game duration and the handling of tie games. From 2008 through 2018, games lasted 9 innings. From 1999 to 2007 and since 2019, games last seven innings. Through 2018, up to two extra innings were available to settle a tie after playing all regulation innings. In 2019 and since 2021, one extra inning may be played, with each half-inning starting with a runner at second base, the last player put out. The home team wins if they take the lead in the 7th or 8th inning; the visitors win if they hang on in either inning; the game is over if it is tied after eight.

=== Changes in 2008 ===
Two major changes took place in the 2008 game:

- For the first time, the United States team was drawn from the pool of players selected by USA Baseball for the 2008 Summer Olympics in Beijing.
- The game lasted nine innings in regulation, rather than seven.

=== Changes in 2019 ===
Two major changes took place in the 2019 game:

- The teams are now called the National League and American League. Players for each are drawn from affiliates of MLB teams in the corresponding MLB leagues.
- The regulation game is now seven innings. If the game is tied after seven, one additional inning is played, with each batting team starting its half with a runner on second base. If the tie still persists after the eighth inning, the game is over.

The first game to end in a tie under the new rules was the 2019 game; it ended the seventh inning tied at 2–all and remained a tie after the completion of the eighth inning.

== Larry Doby Award ==
Note: For the award winners, see the "MVP" column in the "Results" section (below).

Each year, an award is presented to the game's most valuable player. Multiple award winners have gone on to become MLB All-Stars, denoted in the below table of game results. In 2003, the award name was changed from Futures Game Most Valuable Player Award to the Larry Doby Award, named after National Baseball Hall of Fame inductee Larry Doby (1923–2003). Note that the similarly named Larry Doby Legacy Award is an unrelated award presented by the Negro Leagues Baseball Museum.

== Results ==
Key
| MVP | Most valuable player |
| † | MLB All-Star on a future occasion |
| ‡ | MLB All-Star Game MVP on a future occasion |

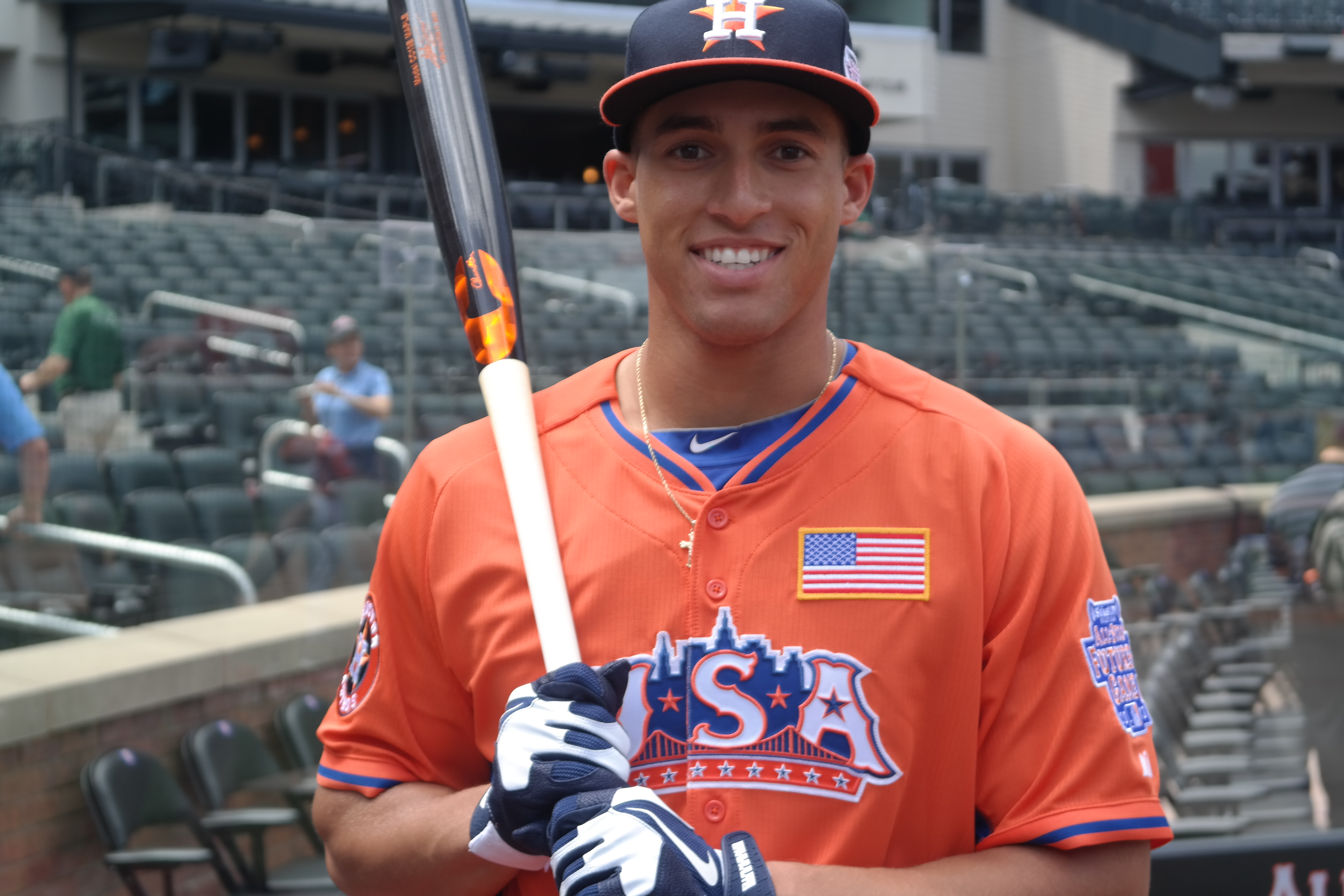
George Springer at the 2013 All-Star Futures Game

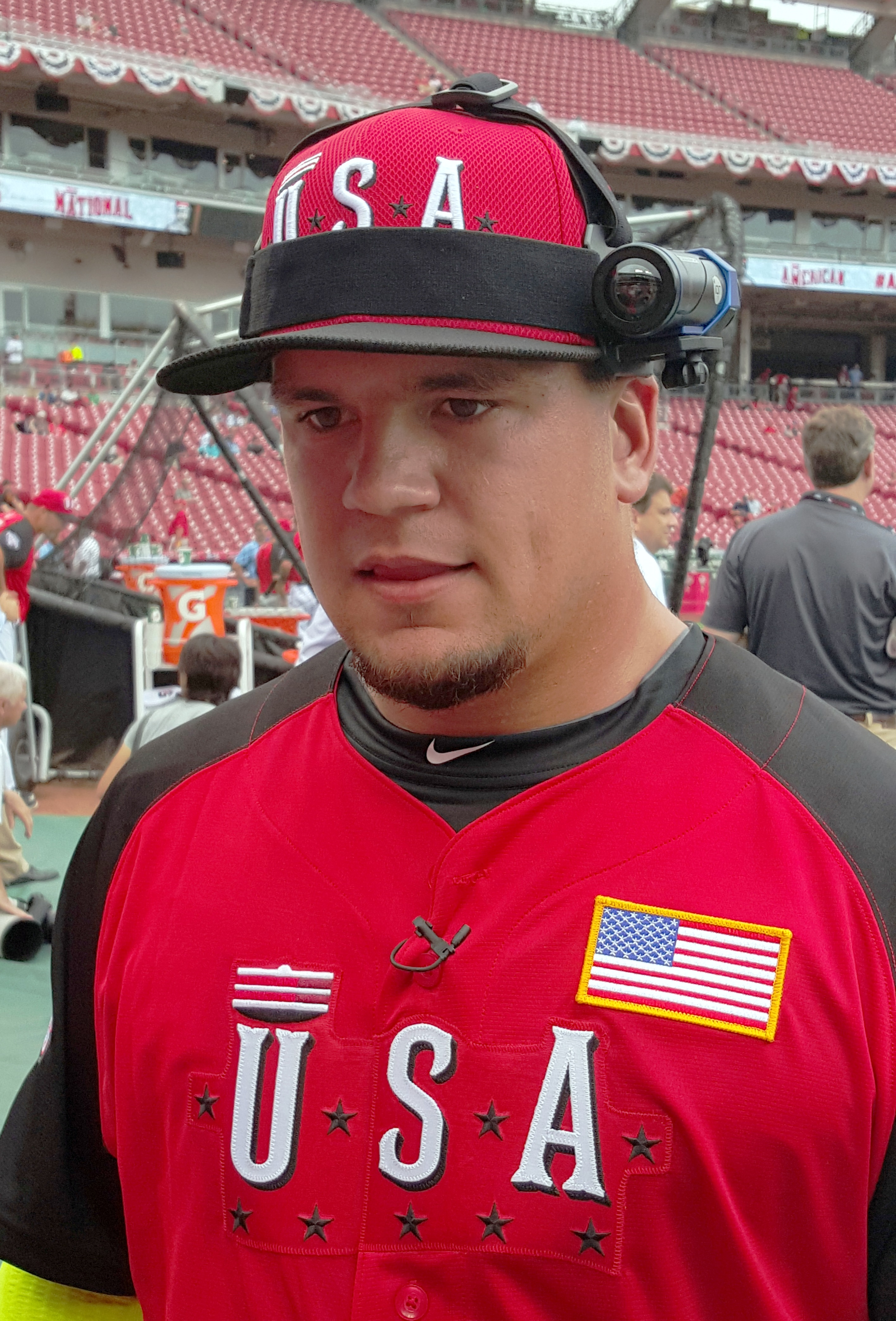
Kyle Schwarber at the 2015 All-Star Futures Game

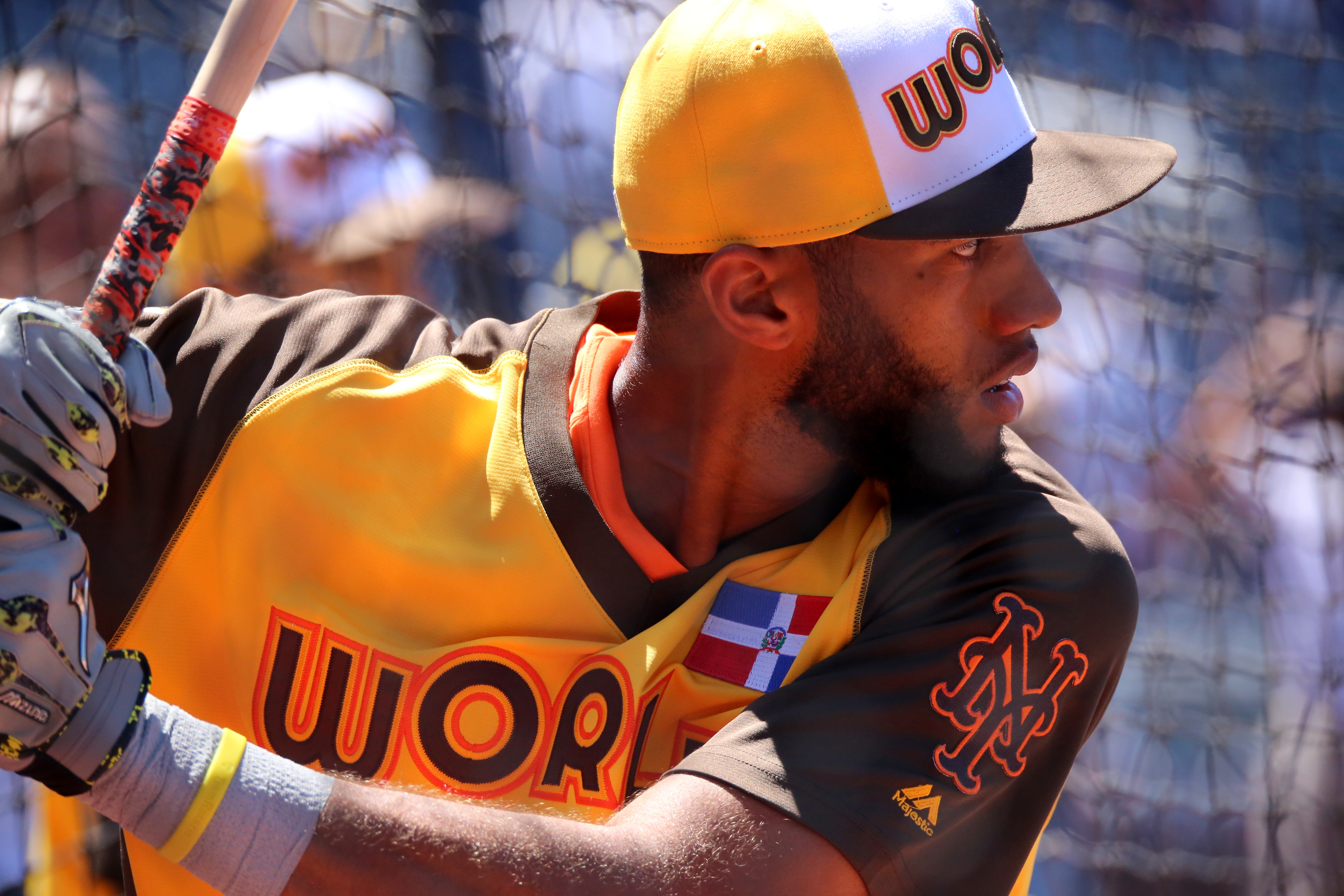
Amed Rosario at the 2016 All-Star Futures Game

=== U.S. vs. World (1999–2018) ===
| Year | Winner | Score | Ballpark | MVP | MVP organization | Ref. |
|---|---|---|---|---|---|---|
| 1999 | World (1–0–0 WLD) | 7–0 | Fenway Park | Alfonso Soriano^{‡} | New York Yankees | |
| 2000 | U.S. (1–1–0) | 3–2 | Turner Field | Sean Burroughs | San Diego Padres | |
| 2001 | U.S. (2–1–0 US) | 5–1 | Safeco Field | Toby Hall | Tampa Bay Devil Rays | |
| 2002 | World (2–2–0) | 5–1 | Miller Park | José Reyes^{†} | New York Mets | |
| 2003 | U.S. (3–2–0 US) | 3–2 | U.S. Cellular Field | Grady Sizemore^{†} | Cleveland Indians | |
| 2004 | U.S. (4–2–0 US) | 4–3 | Minute Maid Park | Aaron Hill^{†} | Toronto Blue Jays | |
| 2005 | World (4–3–0 US) | 4–0 | Comerica Park | Justin Huber | Kansas City Royals | |
| 2006 | U.S. (5–3–0 US) | 8–5 | PNC Park | Billy Butler^{†} | Kansas City Royals | |
| 2007 | World (5–4–0 US) | 7–2 | AT&T Park | Chin-lung Hu | Los Angeles Dodgers | |
| 2008 | World (5–5–0) | 3–0 | Yankee Stadium | Che-hsuan Lin | Boston Red Sox | |
| 2009 | World (6–5–0 WLD) | 7–5 (Note: Game shortened to seven innings after a four-hour rain delay in the first inning.) | Busch Stadium | Rene Tosoni | Minnesota Twins | |
| 2010 | U.S. (6–6–0) | 9–1 | Angel Stadium of Anaheim | Hank Conger | Los Angeles Angels of Anaheim | |
| 2011 | U.S. (7–6–0 US) | 6–4 | Chase Field | Grant Green | Oakland Athletics | |
| 2012 | U.S. (8–6–0 US) | 17–5 | Kauffman Stadium | Nick Castellanos^{†} | Detroit Tigers | |
| 2013 | U.S. (9–6–0 US) | 4–2 | Citi Field | Matt Davidson | Arizona Diamondbacks | |
| 2014 | U.S. (10–6–0 US) | 3–2 | Target Field | Joey Gallo^{†} | Texas Rangers | |
| 2015 | U.S. (11–6–0 US) | 10–1 | Great American Ball Park | Kyle Schwarber^{‡} | Chicago Cubs | |
| 2016 | World (11–7–0 US) | 11–3 | Petco Park | Yoan Moncada | Boston Red Sox | |
| 2017 | U.S. (12–7–0 US) | 7–6 | Marlins Park | Brent Honeywell (Note: First and only pitcher to win the Larry Doby Award.) | Tampa Bay Rays | |
| 2018 | U.S. (13–7–0 US) | 10–6 | Nationals Park | Taylor Trammell | Cincinnati Reds | |

| | U.S. | World | Notes |
|---|---|---|---|
| Wins | 13 | 7 | |
| Runs | 100 | 84 | Most total runs: 22 (2012) |

=== National League vs. American League (2019–present) ===
| Year | Winner | Score | Ballpark | MVP | MVP organization | Ref. |
|---|---|---|---|---|---|---|
| 2019 | TIE (0–0–1) | 2–2 (Note: Game lasted the maximum of eight innings.) | Progressive Field | Sam Huff | Texas Rangers | |
| 2020 | — | — (Note: Game cancelled due to the COVID-19 pandemic.) | Dodger Stadium | — | — | |
| 2021 | National (1–0–1 NL) | 8–3 | Coors Field | Brennen Davis | Chicago Cubs | |
| 2022 | American (1–1–1) | 6–4 | Dodger Stadium | Shea Langeliers^{†} | Oakland Athletics | |
| 2023 | National (2–1–1 NL) | 5–0 | T-Mobile Park | Nasim Nuñez | Miami Marlins | |
| 2024 | National (3–1–1 NL) | 6–1 | Globe Life Field | Cam Collier | Cincinnati Reds | |
| 2025 | National (4–1–1 NL) | 4–2 | Truist Park | Josue De Paula | Los Angeles Dodgers | |
| 2026 | American (4–2–1 NL) | 6–1 | Citizens Bank Park | Nathan Flewelling | Tampa Bay Rays | |

| | National League | American League | Notes |
|---|---|---|---|
| Wins | 4 | 2 | Ties: 1 (2019) |
| Runs | 30 | 14 | Most total runs: 11 (2021) |

== Media coverage ==
From 1999 to 2013, ESPN2 held the rights to the Futures Game. From 2014 to 2021, and from 2024 to 2025, MLB Network held the rights. In 2022 and 2023, the game was streamed on Peacock. Beginning in 2026, the game will air on NBC.

== See also ==
- All-Star Futures Game all-time roster
