= Lonnie Powell =

American painter

- Born: 1941 (age 84–85); Kansas City
- Education: Lincoln University
- Known for: Painting
- Notable work: Bluerooming, Looking Him Back

Lonnie Powell (born 1941 in Kansas City, Missouri) is a multimedia painter and community organizer. Powell's paintings and drawings are housed in the Nerman Museum of Contemporary Art's permanent collection, the Arrowhead Arts Collection, and the Negro Leagues Baseball Museum. His paintings depict portraits of African American men and women. In 2001, Powell founded The Light in the Other Room, a collaborative of African American artists.

== Early life ==
Lonnie Powell grew up in Kansas City, Missouri. Music was an early influence, he recalls, "growing up in Kansas City Missouri, music wafted through the whole segregated community in the forties and fifties in its churches, night clubs, schools and a cappella groups beneath the street lights." His father encouraged him to go to trade school, but after graduating from Central High School in Kansas City, Powell attended Lincoln University in Jefferson City, Missouri, where he graduated in 1966. Powell went on to teach in Kansas City.

== Community involvement ==
In 2001 Powell created the organization The Light in the Other Room, a collaborative of African-American artists. The Light in the Other Room has worked with the Greater Kansas City Links, the Jackson County Links, Hatebusters Inc., the Epsten Gallery, the Sister City Association of Kansas City, Missouri, Central Missouri State University, William Jewell College, Vaughn Cultural Center, and Portfolio Gallery and Education Center of St. Louis, Missouri. The collaborative has also participated in the Artists for Life Project, funded by Rocket Grants to create "compelling and provocative artwork that will encourage the community to take personal responsibility in addressing handgun violence."

== Work and career ==
=== Looking Him Back, 2004 ===
Looking Him Back is a painting based on Powell's memories of watching a Kansas City Monarchs game. "What I tried to do with the piece was to take all of those images that I can remember and put them into one piece. The pitcher is actually a conglomerate of all the pitchers that pitched so well in those days." Powell states that "the piece had to portray the dignity of a people forced to live through a shameful time in our history." Looking Him Back went on tour in the exhibit Shades of Greatness by the Negro Leagues Baseball Museum.

=== Stony the Road, 2005 ===
Stony the Road is a drawing done in charcoal on paper. It is also an acquisition of the Nerman Museum and resides in the permanent collection.

=== Queen Mother, 2007 ===
Queen Mother is painted and drawn with watercolor and pastel on board. It is part of the Nerman Museum of Contemporary Art's permanent collection works on paper.

=== Bluerooming, 2015 ===
Bluerooming is an acquisition of the Arrowhead Art Collection. It is made up of 4-by-2-foot (1.2 by 0.6 m) panels. Powell states that the painting is a portrayal of the music scene in Kansas City. "Bluerooming portrays the two subjects that I am inextricably a part of, jazz and my city. Though figures depicted in this polyptych are not portraits in the true sense of the word, they are inspired by musicians past and present who have performed at the Blue Room from its beginning in the 1930s to the present."

== Awards ==
- 2005 Signature membership in the National Watercolor Society
- 2006 Named "One to Watch" by Watercolor Magic Magazine
- 2013 Best of show Harlem X-Hibit, Black Art in America
- 2015 Missouri Congressman Emanuel Cleaver honored Powell with a Congressional Record Statement.
- 2020 ArtsKC Virtuoso Award

== Exhibitions ==
- 2002 The Light in the Other Room Group Show, 18th Street Studio, Kansas City
- 2004 Vine Street Studio, Kansas City
- 2004 Shades of Greatness, Negro League Museum, Kansas City
- UMKC’s African American History and Culture House
- 2014 All Colors, Portfolio Gallery, St.Louis
- 2017 Vine Street Studio, Kansas City
- 2019 All Colors, Portfolio Gallery, Kansas City
- 2020 All Colors, Portfolio Gallery, St. Louis

== Collections ==
- Collection of Dr. Loretta Britton Saad, 2002
- American Jazz Museum Collection
- Negro Leagues Baseball Museum Collection
- Sprint Art Collection
- H & R Block Art Collection
- Federal Reserve Bank Art Collection
- Nerman Museum of Contemporary Art Collection
- Truman Medical Center Art Collection
- Mulvane Art Museum Collection
- Arrowhead Art Collection
