= Jimmy Rollins =

American baseball player (born 1978)

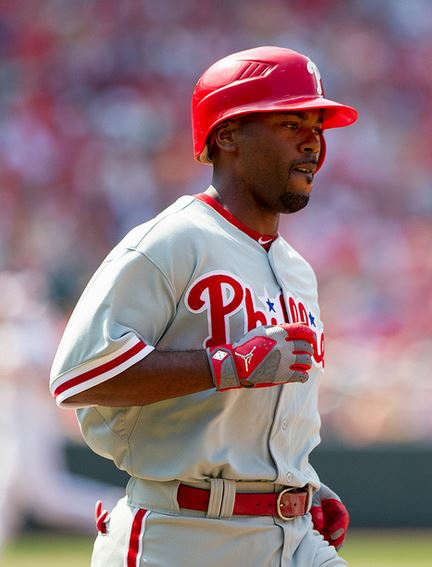
- Rollins with the Philadelphia Phillies in 2012
- Shortstop
- Born: November 27, 1978 (age 47); Oakland, California, U.S.
- Batted: Switch Threw: Right

MLB debut
- September 17, 2000, for the Philadelphia Phillies

Last MLB appearance
- June 8, 2016, for the Chicago White Sox

MLB statistics
- Batting average: .264
- Hits: 2,455
- Home runs: 231
- Runs batted in: 936
- Stolen bases: 470
- Stats at Baseball Reference

Teams
- Philadelphia Phillies (2000–2014); Los Angeles Dodgers (2015); Chicago White Sox (2016)

Career highlights and awards
- 3× All-Star (2001, 2002, 2005); World Series champion (2008); NL MVP (2007); 4× Gold Glove Award (2007–2009, 2012); Silver Slugger Award (2007); Roberto Clemente Award (2014); NL stolen base leader (2001); Philadelphia Phillies Wall of Fame

James Calvin Rollins (born November 27, 1978), nicknamed "J-Roll", is an American former professional baseball shortstop, who played in Major League Baseball (MLB) for the Philadelphia Phillies (2000–2014), Los Angeles Dodgers (2015), and Chicago White Sox (2016).

After growing up in Alameda, California, and attending Encinal High School, Rollins was drafted by the Phillies in the second round of the 1996 MLB draft. After spending most of five seasons with Phillies minor league teams, he made his big league debut on September 17, 2000.

At the major league level, Rollins quickly earned recognition as an excellent defensive shortstop. In 2001, he became the Phillies' leadoff hitter, a role he retained for almost ten years. Rollins made three All-Star Game appearances in his career. While with the Phillies, he compiled a 38-game hitting streak, which spanned the end of the 2005 season and the start of the 2006 season, the longest in team history. Rollins was named the National League (NL) Most Valuable Player (MVP) in 2007, as the Phillies won their division in the first of five consecutive seasons. He was also a key component of the 2008 World Series champion team that defeated the Tampa Bay Rays.

Internationally, Rollins represented the United States. At the 2009 World Baseball Classic, he hit a .417 batting average and was named to the All-World Baseball Classic Team.

In his career, Rollins led the NL four times in triples, and once each in runs, stolen bases, and stolen base percentage. As of 2025, he is the Phillies career leader in at bats (8,628), hits (2,306), doubles (479), and power-speed number (292.5), second in games played (2,090) and stolen bases (453), and third in runs scored (1,325) and triples (111). Rollins won the Gold Glove Award four times, as well as the Silver Slugger Award, and the Roberto Clemente Award (once each).

== Family and background ==
Rollins grew up in Alameda as a member of an athletic family. His mother played competitive fastpitch softball, and he credits the experience with helping him develop a cerebral approach to the game, as well as a passion for the middle infield. His father was a wrestler and weightlifter. Rollins has been described as having "a near-photographic memory of games and at-bats and pitches". Rollins' brother, Antwon, played with minor league affiliates of the Texas Rangers. His sister, Shay Rollins, was a starter on the University of San Francisco's women's basketball team, and he is the cousin of former MLB player Tony Tarasco. Despite the athletes in his family, his father encouraged Rollins to pursue music as well as baseball. Rollins played the trumpet while growing up, and participated in various MC Hammer and Mavis Staples music videos during his adolescent years. Rollins was an Oakland Athletics fan growing up and regularly attended games at Oakland–Alameda County Coliseum.

In 1996, Rollins graduated from Encinal High School in Alameda. His parents refused to let him continue playing football, instead directing him to focus on baseball. He finished his high school baseball career as the holder of 10 school records, including highest batting average (.484), and most stolen bases (99). For his performance, USA Today named him a member of its All-USA High School Baseball Team, and Baseball America named him the top infielder in Northern California, as well as a second-team All-American. The American Baseball Coaches Association and Rawlings also named Rollins to their All-America Second Team. He committed to play college baseball at Arizona State University on a scholarship, but after "effusive" praise from Phillies' Bay Area scout Bob Poole, the team drafted him in the second round of the 1996 Major League Baseball draft.

== Professional career ==
=== Minor leagues: 1996–2000 ===
After being drafted by the Phillies in the second round of the 1996 draft, Rollins was assigned to the rookie-league Martinsville Phillies. He led the team in walks and stole 20 bases, but batted only .238/.351/.285.

However, Rollins still earned a promotion to the low-A Piedmont Boll Weevils for the 1997 season. The youngest player on the team at age 18, he led the team in games played, at-bats, runs (94; 5th in the league), hits (151; 4th), triples (8; tied for 4th), stolen bases (46; 5th), and walks. Rollins batted .270/.330/.370 and had 560 at-bats, over 100 more than second-place Dave Francia. For his performance, he was named a co-winner of the Paul Owens Award, given to the Phillies' top minor league player. At the end of the season, Rollins played in the Florida Instructional League.

Rollins was promoted to high-A Clearwater in 1998. While playing alongside future Phillies teammates Pat Burrell, Johnny Estrada, Adam Eaton, and Brandon Duckworth, Rollins batted .244/.306/.354 with 18 doubles and 23 stolen bases; once again, he was the youngest player on the team. Eaton, Burrell, and Rollins were all promoted to AA Reading together the next year, and Rollins led the team in games and at-bats, as well as hits. His 145 hits gave him an average of .273, and led to a late-season promotion to Scranton/Wilkes-Barre, where he played four games. In 2000, he led Scranton in games played, doubles, and triples, and helped lead the team to the playoffs.

Rollins received a September call-up to the Phillies. He debuted on September 17 Wearing #29 against the Florida Marlins and had two hits in four at-bats in the game, with his first MLB hit being a triple off of Chuck Smith of the Marlins. He batted .321 in 14 games, stealing three bases and batting in five runs. After the season, Baseball America named him the Phillies' top organizational prospect. He was a finalist for the United States national baseball team to participate in the 2000 Olympics.

=== Philadelphia Phillies ===
==== 2001–2004 ====
Rollins switched uniform numbers from 29 to what would be his permanent uniform number 11, despite wearing number 6 for the 2003 season only. Rollins spent the entire 2001 season with the major league Phillies and hit his first MLB home run on May 2 off of Brian Bohanon of the Colorado Rockies. In his rookie season Rollins led the National League in triples and stolen bases, becoming the first rookie to do so since 1951, and led the NL in at bats. He was a member of the NL all-star team in the 2001 Major League Baseball All-Star Game, the Phillies only representative. In July, he took over from Doug Glanville as the Phillies' leadoff hitter, a role he maintained for nearly a decade. At the conclusion of the season, the Negro Leagues Baseball Museum named him the co-winner of the Cool Papa Bell Award, given to the stolen bases leader; MLB managers voted him to the Topps Major League Rookie All-Star team; and Baseball America named him the fifth-best rookie in MLB.

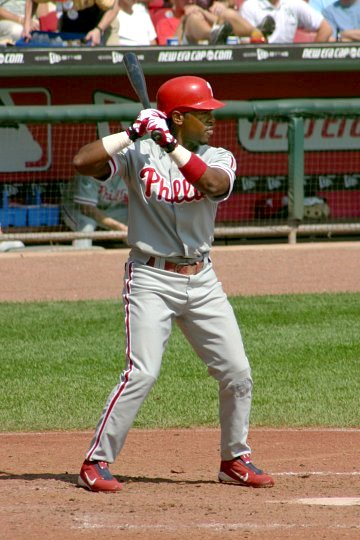
Jimmy Rollins at bat, 2004.

Entering the 2002 season, despite his youth, Rollins sought to be a leader in the Phillies' clubhouse; an article in The Philadelphia Inquirer said, "Rollins, even at just 23 years old, may now have the clout needed to be a stern voice that makes a difference in the clubhouse and on the field." Rollins' season was characterized by a strong first half, and a "sophomore jinx" at the plate that plagued him in the second half of the season. For his performance in the early months of the season, he earned his second consecutive selection to the MLB All-Star game, in doing so becoming the first Phillie and first MLB shortstop ever to reach the game in each of his first two seasons. After the all-star game, however, he struggled at the plate, striking out frequently and chasing many high pitches that were out of the strike zone. Ultimately, Rollins finished the season among the NL leaders in defensive statistics – he compiled a .980 fielding percentage (second in NL), 695 total chances (third in NL), 504 assists (fourth in NL), and 226 putouts (fifth in NL). Meanwhile, offensively, he regressed from his 2001 campaign, batting .245/.306/.380 with 11 home runs, but still leading the NL with 10 triples; he stole 31 bases, 15 fewer than he did in 2001. After the season, he participated in the Major League Baseball Japan All-Star Series.

Prior to the 2003 season, he worked with Tony Gwynn on skills at the plate, predominantly using the whole field and being more of a "slap hitter". However, he began the season slowly, sustaining a hamstring injury in spring training that hindered his progress, and ultimately struggling at the plate early in the season, causing manager Larry Bowa to drop him in the lineup. Throughout the season, he sought to maintain the focus that he admitted to having lost the previous season, and he eventually rebounded to post a "respectable" stat line – a .263/.320/.387 with eight home runs and 62 RBIs, though he stole what at the time was a career-low 20 bases. Among his season highlights were a game-winning RBI against John Smoltz in June, and stealing his 100th career base in September, both of which occurred in games against the Atlanta Braves.

On January 15, Rollins signed a $2.4 million contract with the Phillies to avoid salary arbitration. According to one biography of Rollins,

In 2004, Jimmy finally became the player the Phillies had been waiting for. He batted .289/.348/.455, scored 119 runs, led the league in triples, cut down considerably on his strikeouts, batted well from both sides of the plate, and hit well in the clutch. The workouts with Gwynn had helped, but it was joining morning sessions with (Bobby) Abreu that enabled him to sting the ball with authority and consistency.

Overall, he achieved another "quadruple-double" (home runs, stolen bases, doubles, and triples in double figures in a single season), his first career grand slam and posted career highs in a plethora of offensive categories including batting average, slugging percentage, RBIs, and hits.

==== 2005–2007 ====
Under new manager Charlie Manuel, whose offensive strategy predominantly revolved around hitting many home runs, Rollins struggled to post a strong batting average early in the Phillies' 2005 season. Nevertheless, he was again selected to the NL All-Star team. His offensive strategy changed in early August, when he began a hitting streak that spanned the season's final 36 games; during the streak, he hit .379. It was the longest hitting streak in Phillies' history, surpassing Ed Delahanty, whose streak lasted 31 games. Throughout the streak, Rollins aspired to maintain a team-first mentality, and noted that he would trade the streak for a playoff berth: "If we lose and I keep the streak, what does that mean? The season is automatically over. The playoffs is everything. That's what we all want." Ultimately, the Phillies missed the playoffs by one game. Overall, Rollins compiled his fourth career quadruple-double, tying Johnny Damon for most among active players, and batted .290/.338/.431 with 12 home runs, 54 RBIs, and 41 stolen bases.

The 2006 Phillies season began with much hype surrounding Rollins, and whether he could extend his hitting streak to pass Joe DiMaggio's record 56 games. He extended the streak two games into the season, but it ended on April 6 when he failed to get a hit in a game against the St. Louis Cardinals. He struggled during the first half of the season, posting a batting average of just .259, but rebounded during the second half, ultimately posting strong cumulative numbers once again. He became the third player in Phillies' history to score at least 100 runs in three consecutive seasons (Chuck Klein and Bobby Abreu), and led all NL shortstops in RBIs, runs scored, extra-base hits, and total bases. He was just short, however, of another quadruple-double. Cumulatively, he hit .277/.334/.478 with 25 home runs and 83 RBIs (at the time, the latter two were career-highs) and 36 stolen bases. Once again, the Phillies barely missed the playoffs.

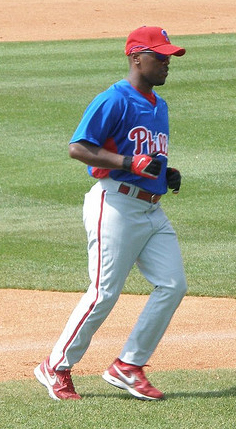
Rollins before a split-squad game against Tampa Bay during 2007 spring training

Before spring training, Rollins announced that the Phillies were the "Team to Beat" in the National League East:

The Mets had a chance to win the World Series last year. Last year is over. I think we are the team to beat in the NL East, finally. But, that's only on paper.

— Jimmy Rollins, January 23, 2007

It became a sports media sensation, especially given that the New York Mets had won the division in 2006 with relative ease. The claim was widely reported, often without the second part of the quote ("only on paper"). USA Today columnist Hal Bodley opined, "The Phillies have needed someone to light a fire, especially in April. Rollins' bold, if not arrogant, prediction might just do that." During the first half of the season, it appeared Rollins had spoken prematurely, as the Mets jumped out to an early divisional lead. On June 28, Rollins had a four-hit game against the Cincinnati Reds, including a game-tying triple. The triple was Rollins' 10th, which gave him his fifth career "quadruple–double".

In August, the Mets' lead began to dissipate, as the Phillies combined several solid series; Rollins was a key component of their success. Rollins was named the National League Player of the Week for August 27 to September 2, 2007. On September 25 against the Atlanta Braves, Rollins hit the home run that completed his 30–30 season. On the last day of the 2007 season, Rollins became the seventh player to collect at least 20 doubles, 20 triples, and 20 home runs in one season when he hit his 20th triple of the year in a 6–1 win over the Washington Nationals that clinched the National League East division championship for the Phillies, which confirmed Rollins' preseason assertion of the Phillies preeminence.

For the 2007 season, he batted .296/.344/.531 and led the league in games (162), at bats (716—a major league record), runs (139), and triples (20), was second in hits (212), total bases (380), extra base hits (88), and power-speed number (34.6), and had 30 home runs, 94 RBIs, and 41 stolen bases (5th in the league). He achieved the "quadruple-double" (double digit doubles, triples, home runs, and stolen bases), becoming the fourth player in history to accomplish the mark. He would join Jim Bottomley as the only players to record a 30 double, 20 triple, and 30 home run season. The club advanced to the playoffs for the first time since their 1993 World Series loss; however, they were swept by the Colorado Rockies in the National League Division Series.

Rollins was named the National League's Most Valuable Player. He also received the NLBM Oscar Charleston Legacy Award (NL MVP), and won the first of three consecutive Gold Glove Awards, becoming the first Phillies shortstop to win a Gold Glove since Larry Bowa in 1978. He was the first player in MLB history to record 200 hits, 20 triples, 30 home runs, and 30 stolen bases in a season. Rollins also set a single-season MLB record for plate appearances with 778.

==== 2008–2011 ====
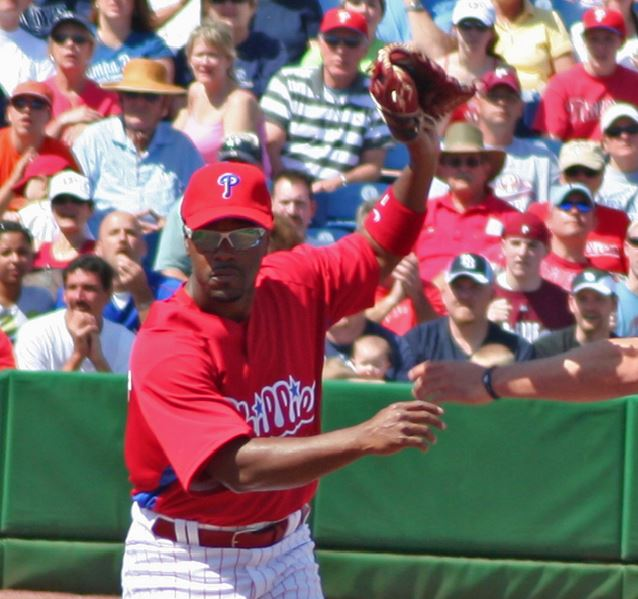
Jimmy Rollins right after a throw to first base, 2009.

Unlike in spring training 2007, Rollins "made no guarantees heading into the next season, but that didn't mean the Phillies weren't confident" entering their 2008 season, despite the Mets' acquisition of Johan Santana and a "2007 Rollins-esque" guarantee of winning the division from Carlos Beltrán. After beginning the season by hitting a home run on opening day, Rollins landed on the disabled list (DL) for the first time in his career in early April, suffering an ankle sprain. He returned in May, and had a "productive" summer, ultimately posting a career-high 47 stolen bases, notwithstanding his batting average dropping to .277, and his home run and RBI totals dropping to 11 and 59 respectively. In the postseason, Rollins was a focal point of the team, which ultimately won the 2008 World Series; in the division series (NLDS), he hit a leadoff home run in game four, and in the championship series (NLCS), he hit a leadoff home run in game five, and despite struggles early in the World Series, he eventually contributed with strong situational hitting, helping the Phillies win the series in five games. At the conclusion of the season, Rollins was honored with a Fielding Bible Award for defensive excellence as the top MLB shortstop during the year.

Rollins began 2009 by participating in the 2009 World Baseball Classic (WBC) as a member of Team USA; he hit .417 and was named to the all-tournament team. After setting a career high in stolen bases in 2008, he did not steal one in the season's first 17 games, his longest drought to begin a season since 2004. On May 21, he reached the 1500-hit milestone in a game against the Cincinnati Reds. As of the end of June, however, he was hitting just .205 (he went 28 consecutive at-bats without a hit from the end of June until July 2), and was benched for four games by Charlie Manuel in an effort to encourage him to regain the shorter, lower half-driven swing that he used in his 2007 MVP campaign. He did improve in the second half of the season, batting .288 from July 3 to the end of the year. Overall, he compiled an NL-leading 672 at-bats, finished fourth in doubles (43) and stolen bases (31), and tenth in runs (100); in addition, he had a .250 batting average, 21 home runs (five of which were leadoff, the most in his career), and 77 RBIs, also winning the National League Gold Glove award for shortstops. In the postseason, he helped the Phillies reach the 2009 World Series by hitting a walk-off double in game four of the NLCS. The Phillies failed to repeat as champions, however, losing to the New York Yankees in six games.

Rollins's 2010 season was marked by injuries; he missed a total of 74 games, playing in only 88, the lowest total of his major league career. While warming up in the outfield prior to the Phillies' game on April 12, he strained his right calf, and eventually was placed on the disabled list. He spent April 13 – May 16, and May 22 – June 21 on the DL with that injury; Wilson Valdez served as his backup. When he returned, he hit his first career walk-off home run on June 23, powering the Phillies to a 7–6 victory over the Cleveland Indians. On July 3, he hit his 150th career home run in a game against the Pittsburgh Pirates, and on October 1, he hit his third career grand slam in a game against the Atlanta Braves. Overall, he hit .243 with eight home runs and 41 RBIs. He maintained his strong defense despite poor offense, but after his third consecutive mediocre offensive season, some questioned whether his MVP campaign in 2007 was a fluke.

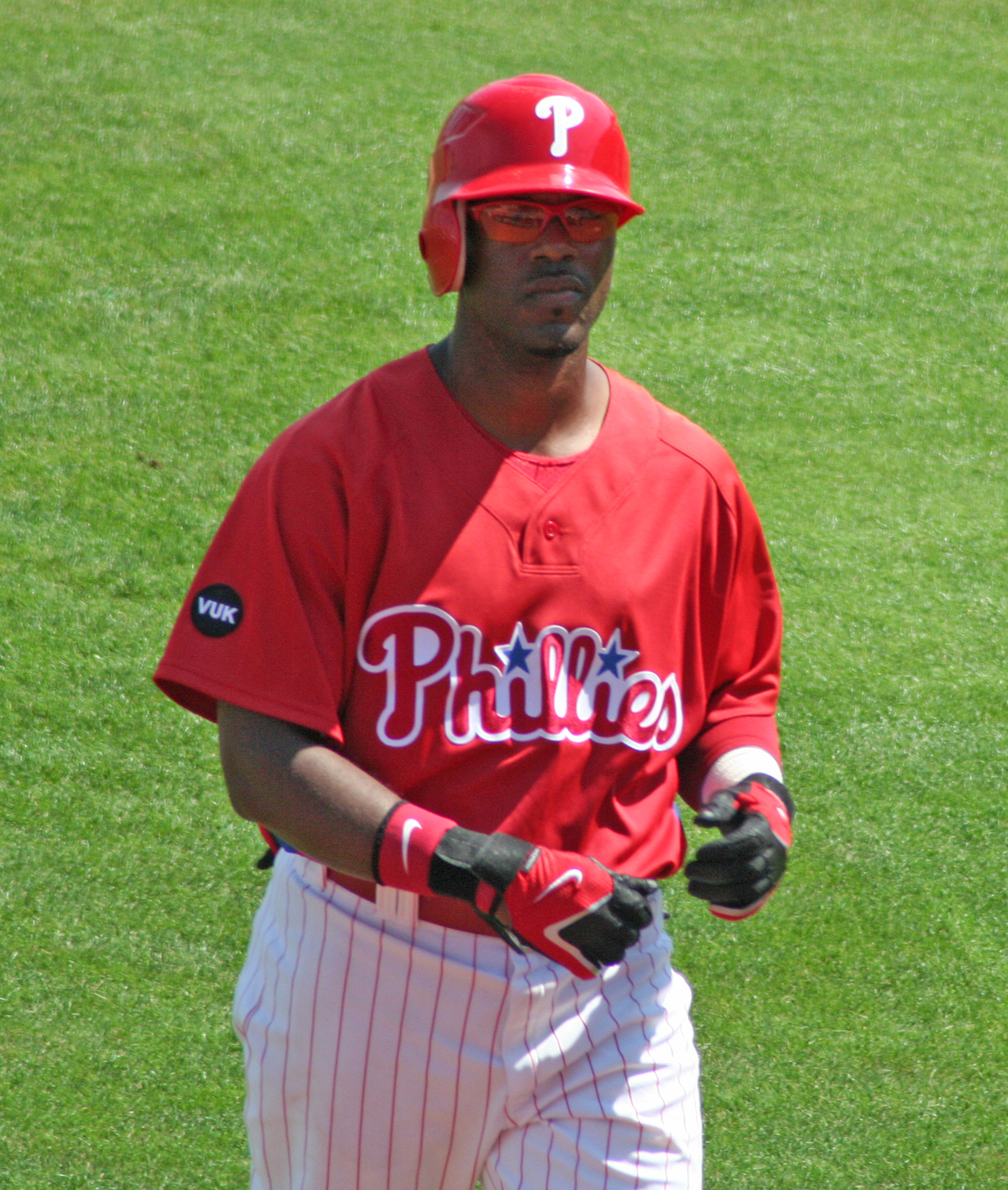
Rollins on the basepaths

2011 was a contract year for Rollins, and his performance concurrently rebounded, insofar as he improved his batting average, and home run and RBI totals. He made his 11th consecutive opening day start, and, for the first time in several seasons, he was healthy at the beginning of the season, starting the season's first 49 games. Nevertheless, it took him 54 plate appearances to record his first RBI, the longest drought of his career. On July 20, for the second time in his career, he had a multi-home run game in which one home run came batting right-handed and the other left-handed, the first Phillies player to do it multiple times. His season was not entirely devoid of injuries; on August 22, a right groin strain landed him on the DL, causing him to miss 18 games. He returned in time for the playoffs, and set several Phillies records in the 2011 NLDS, including hits (9), doubles (4), and multi-hit games (4). Despite the records, the Phillies lost the series to the St. Louis Cardinals. Overall, he posted a .268 batting average with 16 home runs and 63 RBIs. At the season's conclusion, Rollins was selected as the shortstop on the MLB Insiders Club Magazine All-Postseason Team. On December 17, 2011, Rollins signed a three-year, $33 million deal with a vesting option for a fourth year, worth another $11 million. The option vested when he reached 1,100 plate appearances in 2013–14.

==== 2012–2014 ====
In 2012, Rollins epitomized the Phillies' general "averageness" by posting a .250 batting average with 23 home runs and 68 RBIs. He hit poorly in the beginning of the season, and did not hit a home run until his 136th at bat of the season, the second-longest it had ever taken him to hit a home run at the beginning of a season. He missed three games from May 21–23 for the birth of his first daughter. On July 31, he hit his fourth career inside-the-park home run, which led active players. His hitting improved over the latter half of the season, and in September, he hit eight home runs. He missed the final three games of the season with a calf strain. During the season, he joined Craig Biggio, Barry Larkin, and Paul Molitor as the only players in MLB history to record 2000 hits, 350 stolen bases, and 150 home runs as a member of one team. It was his fourth career season during which he hit at least 20 home runs and stole 30 bases, which trailed only Bobby and Barry Bonds.

Prior to the 2013 season, Rollins played for Team USA in the 2013 World Baseball Classic (WBC), and was the only player from Team USA to make the event's all-star team; it was his second WBC, and second placement on the all-star team. He was back to the Phillies in time for opening day, and made his 13th consecutive start on opening day. Overall, he tied for fifth in the NL in games (160), and led the team with 600 at-bats, 151 hits, 36 doubles, and 59 walks. He achieved several career milestones during the season, including his 800th RBI (April 22), his 433 double (breaking Ed Delahanty's record on May 15), and his 45th career leadoff home run (fourth most in MLB history; hit on July 20). Despite the achievements, overall, the season was a decline from previous years; his isolated power (ISO) was among the worst in the major leagues, he attempted to steal the fewest bases in his career, and his defense "tanked" according to fielding metrics. He "struggled mightily" and ultimately posted a .252 batting average with six home runs and 39 RBIs.

Rollins attracted media attention in the offseason prior to 2014 when he supposedly expressed disinclination or lack of motivation after commenting "who cares" in regards to spring training; Buster Olney penned a column suggesting that there was a sentiment within the Phillies' organization that he should be traded (the rumors were dispelled by Rollins and Phillies general manager Rubén Amaro, Jr. as ridiculous). He opened the season by hitting a grand slam against the Texas Rangers, which was also his 200th career home run. After two games, Rollins left the team on paternity leave to be with his wife as the couple had their second child. On June 14, Rollins singled to right field for his 2,235th hit to surpass Mike Schmidt as the Phillies' all-time leader in hits. The game paused as Schmidt and the remainder of the Phillies congratulated Rollins at first base. Following the season, Rollins and recently retired Chicago White Sox captain Paul Konerko became the first ever co-winners of the Roberto Clemente Award.

=== Los Angeles Dodgers ===
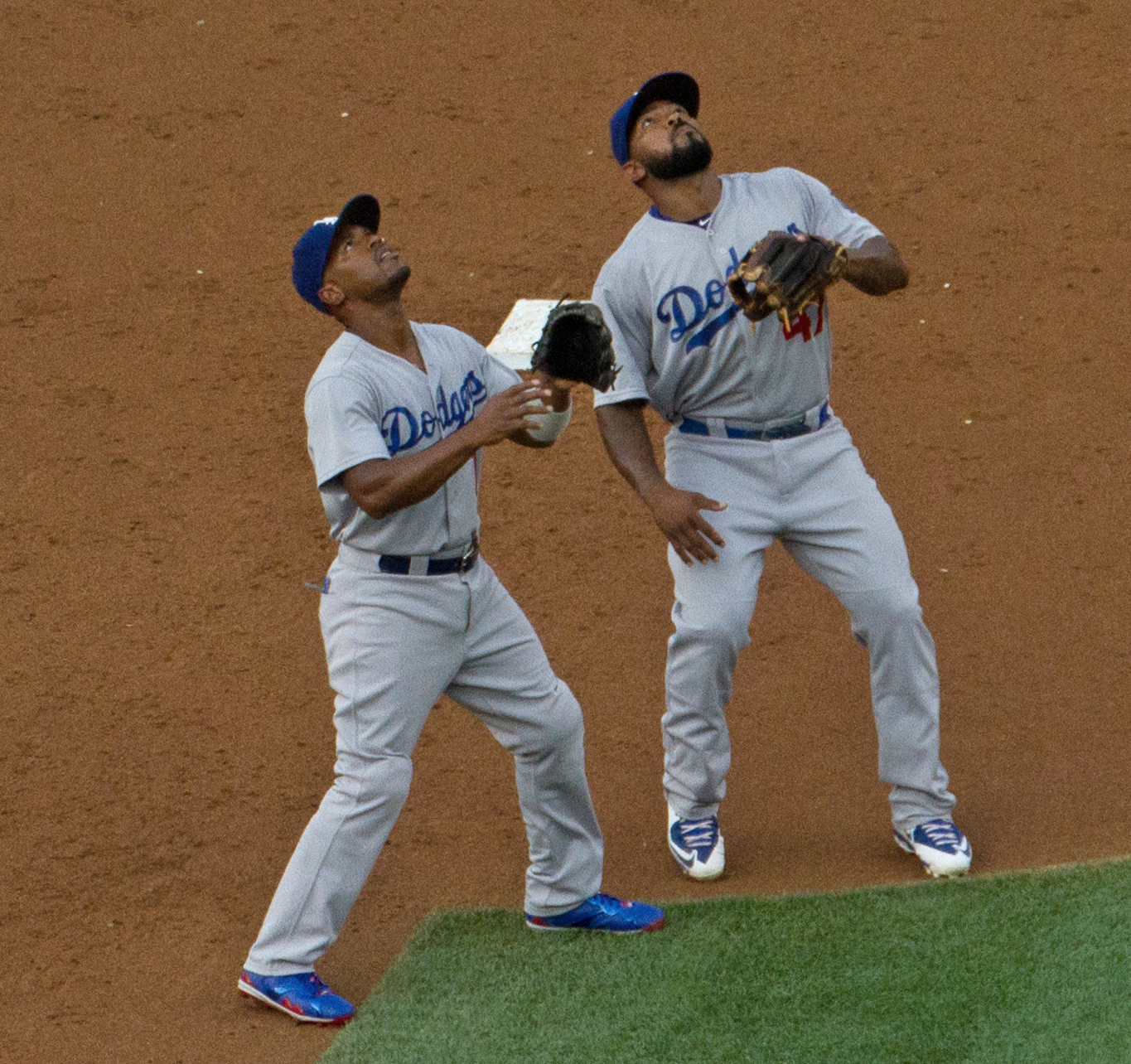
Rollins (left), with Howie Kendrick, playing for the Los Angeles Dodgers in 2015

On December 19, 2014, Rollins was traded to the Los Angeles Dodgers in exchange for minor league pitchers Tom Windle and Zach Eflin. Rollins waived his no-trade clause and stated that he was expecting to take on a leadership position with his new team.

Rollins played his first game with the Dodgers during opening day against the San Diego Padres on April 6, 2015, hitting a 3-run homer off of Shawn Kelley, giving the Dodgers a 6–3 victory over the Padres. He struggled offensively with the Dodgers, hitting a career low .224 (the lowest batting average among all qualified major league batters)/.285/.358 with 13 homers and 41 RBI. He also stole 12 bases. In September, he lost his starting job to rookie Corey Seager. For the final game of the season, manager Don Mattingly designated Rollins to be the 2015 player manager.

=== Chicago White Sox ===
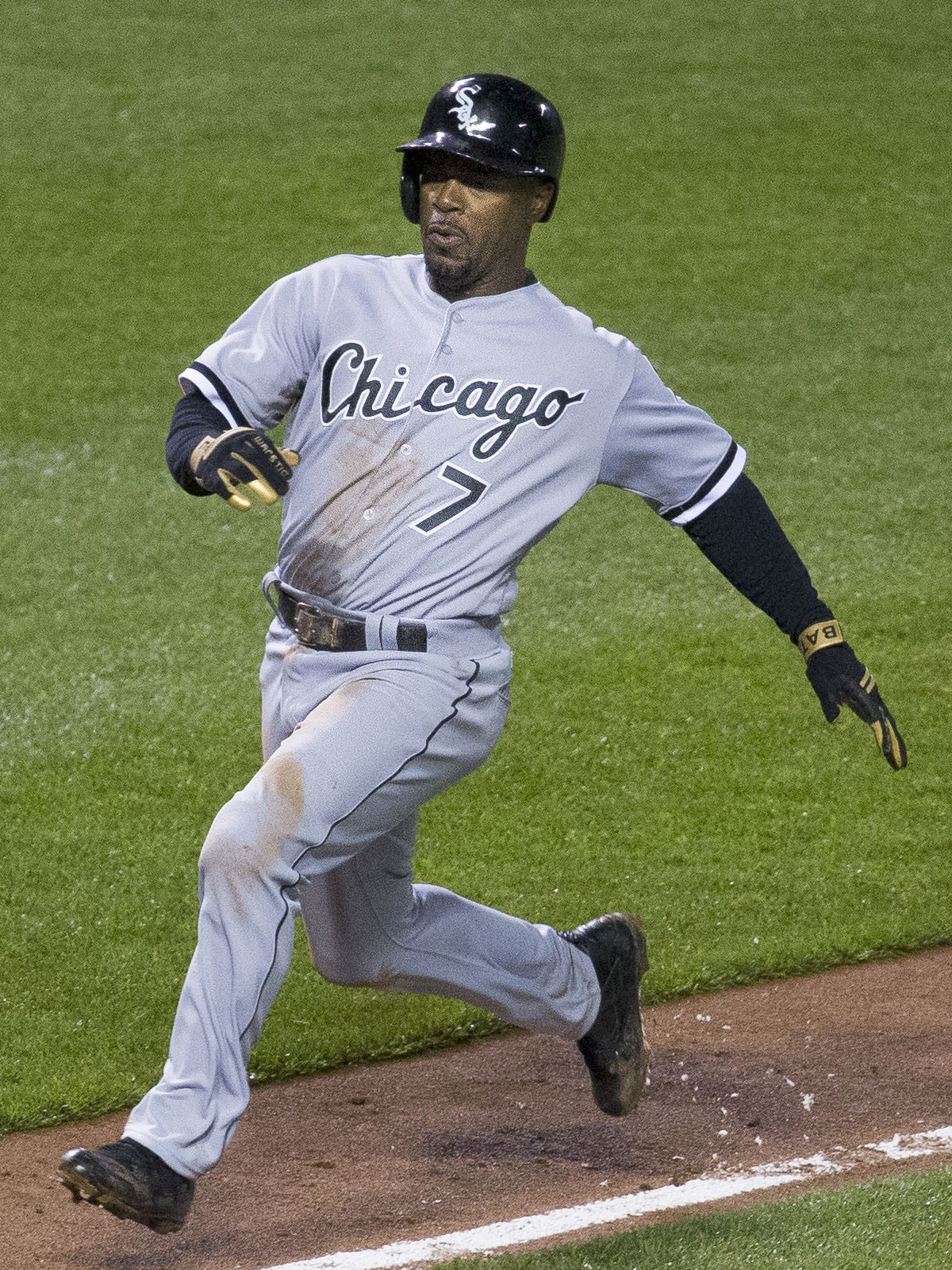
Rollins playing for the Chicago White Sox in 2016

On February 22, 2016, Rollins signed a minor league contract with the Chicago White Sox that included an invitation to major league spring training. He competed with Tyler Saladino for a starting role at shortstop. At the end of spring training, the team announced that Rollins would serve as their Opening Day shortstop. Due to Rollins' familiar number 11 already being retired in honor of Luis Aparicio, Rollins wore number 7 for the White Sox, which the following year would be worn by the man who replaced Rollins at shortstop, Tim Anderson.

Rollins batted .221/.295/.329 with 2 home runs and 5 stolen bases in 41 games for the White Sox. On June 10, he was designated for assignment so the White Sox could promote Tim Anderson from the minor leagues.

=== San Francisco Giants ===
On December 19, 2016, Rollins signed a minor league contract with the San Francisco Giants that included an invitation to spring training. He was released on March 31, 2017.

== Post-playing career ==
In 2019, Rollins returned to the Phillies in two separate capacities: in January, as a special advisor for the team; and in March, as an on-air commentator for their television broadcasts. On May 4, 2019, a retirement ceremony honoring Rollins was held at Citizens Bank Park; the Phillies have not retired Rollins' uniform number 11, although it has not been reissued since he wore it.

After advising the team since 2019, the Phillies announced on March 31, 2022, that Rollins had been named a special advisor to the president of baseball operations.

== Player profile ==
=== Career statistics ===
Rollins, at his retirement, was one of 19 ballplayers to have recorded 2,000 games at the shortstop position and was the only shortstop to have amassed 200 homers and 400 steals. He was 20th all-time among MLB players in career power-speed number (309.8), 31st in stolen base percentage (81.74), 42nd in assists (6,139), and 46th in stolen bases (470). In his career, he led the National League four times in triples, and once each in runs, stolen bases, and stolen base percentage.

As of 2023, he was the Phillies career leader in at bats (8,628), hits (2,306), doubles (479), and power-speed number (292.5), second in games played (2,090) and stolen bases (453), and third in runs (1,325), triples (111), and stolen base percentage (82.66).

=== Offense ===
Growing up, Rollins admired Rickey Henderson, one of the best leadoff hitters in MLB history, and especially early in his career, he sought to emulate Henderson at the plate. This contributed to his propensity to swing early in the count, and chase high pitches, seeking to hit home runs rather than get on base, the stereotypical role of a leadoff hitter. Consequently, he struggled to make contact with the ball, striking out too much, and rarely walking. To help alleviate those predominantly negative tendencies, he worked with Tony Gwynn prior to the 2003 season on using the whole field, and hitting more ground balls than pop-ups. Overall, he "always had a hard time accepting that he is vertically challenged at 5-foot-8", which contributed to his inclination to strive to hit for power rather than contact, and to seek to pull the ball rather than use the whole field. Rollins is the Phillies all-time leader in hits, and has the second-most stolen bases in Phillies history.

=== Defense ===
A "supreme defensive shortstop", Rollins won four Gold Glove Awards, and only Omar Vizquel has a better fielding percentage among shortstops who played at least 10 seasons. Rollins attributes some of his defensive prowess to experience, noting that he played in MLB for a long enough time to know most hitters' tendencies and to learn how to read swings, both of which helped him appropriately position himself to get to as many balls as possible. In their 2011 season preview, Lindy's Sports commented that Rollins was an upper-echelon shortstop "with soft hands, excellent agility and plus range left and right" and praised his strong throwing arm, especially from the hole.

=== Hall of Fame ===
Rollins was included on the ballot for the National Baseball Hall of Fame class of 2022 when it was announced on November 22, 2021. He received Hall of Fame votes on 9.4% of the ballots in his first year of eligibility, falling well short of election to the Hall of Fame. In 2023, this percentage rose to 12.9%.

== Personal life ==
Rollins resides in the Tampa, Florida, area and is married to Johari Smith. They were married on January 23, 2010, in the Cayman Islands. On May 21, 2012, Johari gave birth to the couple's first daughter, Camryn Drew Rollins. Their second daughter, Logan Aliya, was born in early April 2014. When he played for the Phillies, Rollins resided in Woolwich Township, New Jersey. Osiris Johnson, a cousin of Rollins, is also a baseball player, and was drafted in the second round, 37th overall in the 2018 draft by the Miami Marlins.

An active philanthropist, Rollins and his wife Johari have participated in several charitable endeavors including the creation of The Johari & Jimmy Rollins Center for Animal Rehabilitation, which is located in Woolwich Township, New Jersey, and provides several medical rehabilitation services for animals and an annual BaseBOWL charity bowling tournament to benefit the Arthritis Foundation. Rollins is also active politically and campaigned for Barack Obama in the 2008 presidential election. In 2020, he supported Bernie Sanders for president.

Rollins is an investor for esports team NRG Esports.

== See also ==
- 20–20–20 club
- List of Major League Baseball annual stolen base leaders
- List of Major League Baseball annual triples leaders
- List of Major League Baseball career assists leaders
- List of Major League Baseball career at-bat leaders
- List of Major League Baseball career doubles leaders
- List of Major League Baseball career hits leaders
- List of Major League Baseball career putouts as a shortstop leaders
- List of Major League Baseball career runs scored leaders
- List of Major League Baseball career stolen bases leaders
- List of Major League Baseball career triples leaders
- List of Major League Baseball triples records

Awards
Preceded by Rafael Furcal	Topps Rookie All-Star Shortstop; 2001	Succeeded by Ramón Santiago
Preceded by Ryan Howard	Mike Schmidt Most Valuable Player; 2007	Succeeded by Brad Lidge
