= Bob Kendrick =

President of the Negro Leagues Baseball Museum

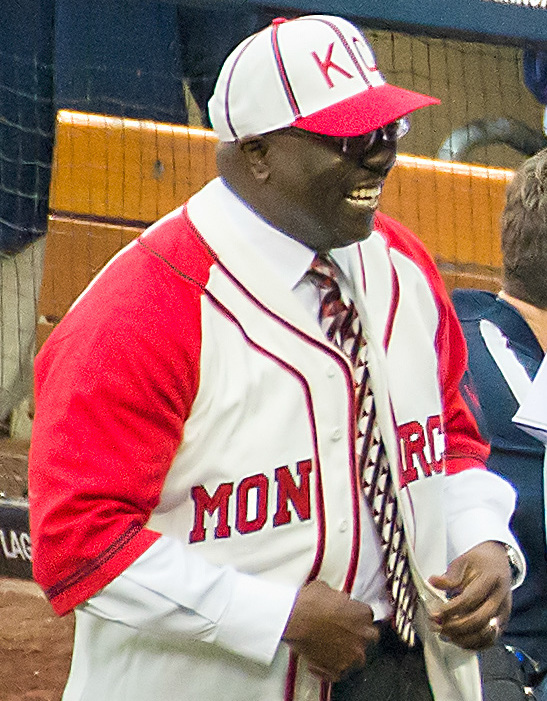
- Kendrick at Petco Park in 2011
- Born: June 15, 1962 (age 64); Crawfordville, Georgia, U.S.
- Occupation: President
- Known for: Negro Leagues Baseball Museum

Bob Kendrick (born June 15, 1962) is the President of the Negro Leagues Baseball Museum (NLBM) in Kansas City, Missouri. Prior to that he served as the museum's first Director of Marketing and was promoted to Vice President of Marketing in 2009. He left to serve as Executive Director of the National Sports Center for the Disabled Kansas City in 2010 and returned to the NLBM in 2011.

Kendrick has created many signature museum educational programs and events including the Hall of Game which honors former Major League Baseball greats who played "in the spirit and signature style of the Negro leagues." With the museum shut down in early 2020 due to COVID-19, on the 100th anniversary of the founding of the Negro leagues, he oversaw the NLBM's Tipping Your Cap campaign. This was an online campaign to get people to pay their respect to the early players and teams of the Negro leagues, players who were not given a chance to play in the Major Leagues until Jackie Robinson played with the Dodgers in 1947. All former US Presidents have participated in this campaign. The Museum re-opened provisionally in mid-June 2020 and Kendrick said it's needed now more than ever because "[y]ou need to see the pain that (African-Americans) have experienced, but you also need to see their successes."

Kendrick has been the recipient of the Mary Lona Diversity Award from the Greater Kansas City Black Chamber of Commerce in 2006 and he was named “Citizen of the Year” by the Omicron Xi chapter of the Omega Psi Phi fraternity. The Kansas City Globe named Kendrick on their list of “100 Most Influential African-Americans in Greater Kansas City” in 2009. Kendrick was inducted into the Missouri Sports Hall of Fame in 2014.

== Early life and education ==
Kendrick was born in Crawfordville, Georgia. He went to Park College on a basketball scholarship in 1980 and earned a B.A. in Communications Arts in 1985.
