= Legacy Awards (NLBM) =

Professional baseball awards

- Sport: Baseball
- League: Major League Baseball (MLB)
- Awarded for: Best players, managers, and executives in MLB in various categories, for on-field and off-field achievement
- Presented by: Negro Leagues Baseball Museum

History
- First award: 2000

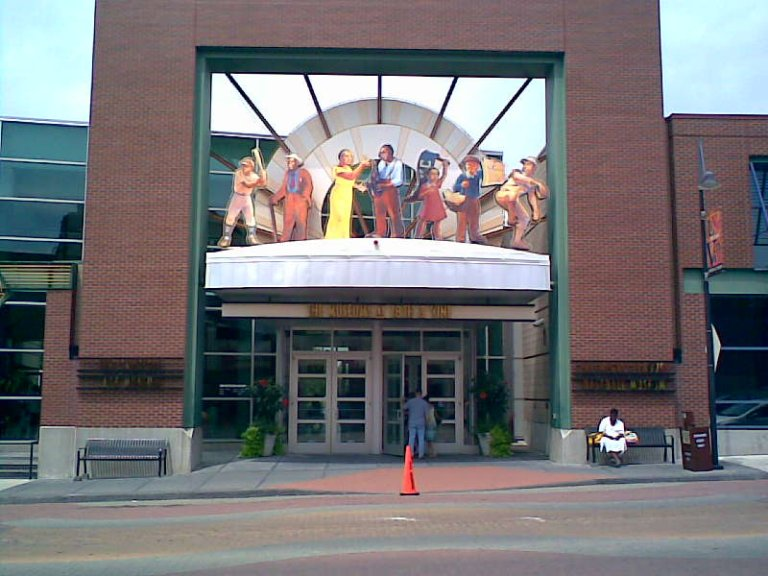
Entrance to the Negro Leagues Baseball Museum in Kansas City, Missouri

The Legacy Awards are presented annually by the Negro Leagues Baseball Museum (NLBM), headquartered in Kansas City, Missouri. The "Hall of Game Award"—established in 2014 and honoring players who personify "the spirit of the way the game was played in the Negro Leagues"—is the only such award actively presented since 2018.

A number of Legacy Awards were previously issued to the best players, managers, and executives in each league of Major League Baseball (MLB), for on-field and off-the-field achievement. The awards were named for legendary players of Negro league baseball, and first presented following the 2000 MLB season. Awards were later added for baseball writers and philanthropists.

== History ==
The first Legacy Awards were presented in November 2000 at the "Legacy 2000 Players’ Reunion and Awards Banquet", which was organized to honor the 10th anniversary of the opening of the museum and the 80th anniversary of the establishment of the Negro National League. For the next nine years (2001–2009), each year's awards were presented at a banquet in January or February of the following year. Proceeds from the Legacy Awards annual banquets were used for the benefit of the museum.

In 2010, there was no banquet. Instead, the awards were presented at separate events at the museum and in various major-league ballparks through the spring of 2011. The 12th annual awards (for 2011) were presented at an awards banquet on January 28, 2012.

In January 2013, NLBM president Bob Kendrick announced that the 2013 awards banquet would be the final one held. All further awards would be presented in the same manner as the 2010 awards, at various MLB ballparks or at the museum if the award winner happened to be in Kansas City to play against the Royals. The logistics of off-season travel were the primary reason cited by Kendrick for this change. Of all those honored for their 2012 season, only Everth Cabrera of the San Diego Padres, traveling from his off-season home in Nicaragua, was able to make it to Kansas City for the January banquet and presentation.

The "Hall of Game Award", established in 2014, is the only award actively presented since 2018.

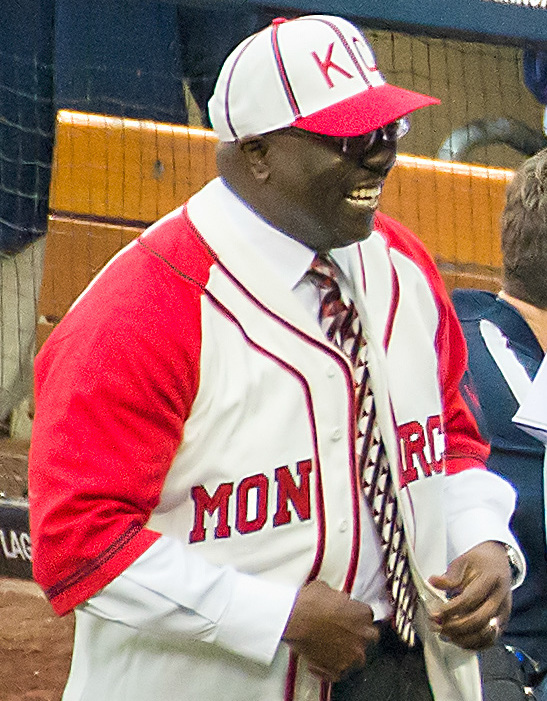
NLBM president Bob Kendrick wearing a Kansas City Monarchs jersey

Awards have been issued in the following categories:

- Hall of Game Award – former Major League Baseball stars
- Oscar Charleston Legacy Award – "Most Valuable Players" in the National (NL) and American (AL) leagues
- Pitcher of the Year – "Pitchers of the Year" in the NL and AL:
  - Leroy "Satchel" Paige Legacy Award (2000–2005)
  - Wilbur "Bullet" Rogan Legacy Award (2006–present)
- Larry Doby Legacy Award – "Rookies of the Year" in the NL and AL
- Hilton Smith Legacy Award – "Relievers of the Year" in the NL and AL
- Walter "Buck" Leonard Legacy Award – batting champions in the NL and AL
- Josh Gibson Legacy Award – "Home Run" leaders in the NL and AL
- James "Cool Papa" Bell Legacy Award – "Stolen Base" leaders in the NL and AL
- Charles Isham "C. I." Taylor Legacy Award – "Managers of the Year" in the NL and AL
- Andrew "Rube" Foster Legacy Award – "Executives of the Year" in the NL and AL
- Kansas City Mondards Award - Royals player and pitcher of the year
- John Henry "Pop" Lloyd Legacy Award – in recognition of "Baseball and Community Leadership"
- Sam Lacy Legacy Award – "Baseball Writer of the Year"
- Jackie Robinson Lifetime Achievement Award – for "Career Excellence in the Face of Adversity"
- John "Buck" O'Neil Legacy Award – to a local or national corporate/private philanthropist for "Outstanding Support of the NLBM"

Winners of each award are listed below.

== Active awards ==
=== Hall of Game Award ===
The Hall of Game Award was introduced by the NLBM on February 13, 2014. The Hall of Game annually honors former Major League Baseball (MLB) stars who played the game with the same passion, determination, flair and skill exhibited by the heroes of the Negro leagues. In addition to the ceremony, Hall of Game inductees will also receive permanent recognition as part of the future Buck O’Neil Education and Research Center being developed by the NLBM at the site of the Paseo YMCA, the birthplace of the Negro leagues.

- 2014: Lou Brock, Roberto Clemente, Joe Morgan, Dave Winfield
- 2015: Rickey Henderson, Ferguson Jenkins, Ozzie Smith, Luis Tiant
- 2016: Orlando Cepeda, Andre Dawson, Tony Oliva, Tim Raines
- 2017: Al Oliver, Tony Pérez, Lee Smith, Maury Wills
- 2018: Dick Allen, Kenny Lofton, Eddie Murray, J. R. Richard
  - Note: Mudcat Grant was originally slated for induction but was unable to attend.
- 2019: Eric Davis, Fred McGriff, Dave Parker, Dave Stewart
- 2023: Vida Blue, Al Downing, Dwight Gooden, Mike Norris and Dontrelle Willis [39]
  - Note: CC Sabathia and David Price had schedule conflicts and will be inducted in a subsequent class.

== Inactive awards ==
=== Oscar Charleston Legacy Award ===
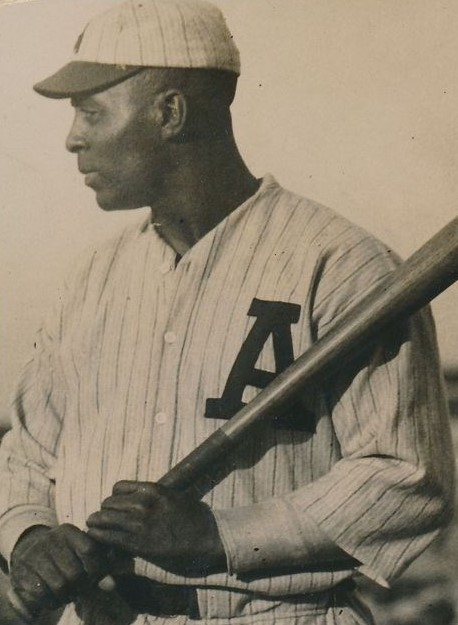
Oscar Charleston

The Oscar Charleston Legacy Award is given annually to the "Most Valuable Players" in the National and American leagues.

- 2001: Jason Giambi (Athletics; AL)
- 2002: Barry Bonds (Giants; NL)and Alex Rodriguez (Rangers; AL)
- 2003: Alex Rodriguez (Rangers; AL)
- 2004: Barry Bonds (Giants; NL) and Gary Sheffield (Yankees; AL)
- 2005: Albert Pujols (Cardinals; NL) and Alex Rodriguez (Yankees; AL)
- 2006: Ryan Howard (Phillies; NL) and Derek Jeter (Yankees; AL)
- 2007: Jimmy Rollins (Phillies; NL) and Alex Rodriguez (Yankees; AL)
- 2008: Albert Pujols (Cardinals; NL) and Joe Mauer (Twins; AL)
- 2009: Albert Pujols (Cardinals; NL) and Joe Mauer (Twins; AL)
- 2010: Joey Votto (Reds; NL) and Josh Hamilton (Rangers; AL)
- 2011: Matt Kemp (Dodgers; NL) and Curtis Granderson (Yankees; AL)
- 2012: Andrew McCutchen (Pirates; NL) and Mike Trout (Angels; AL)
- 2013:
- 2014:
- 2015: Bryce Harper (Nationals; NL) and Josh Donaldson (Blue Jays; AL)
- 2016: Kris Bryant (Cubs; NL) and Mookie Betts (Red Sox; AL)
- 2017:

=== Pitcher of the Year ===
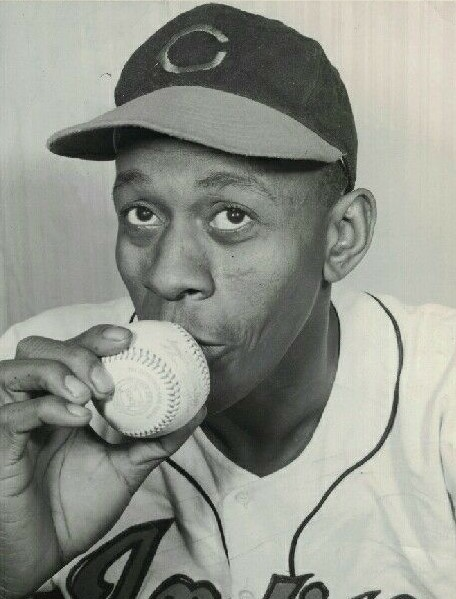
Satchel Paige

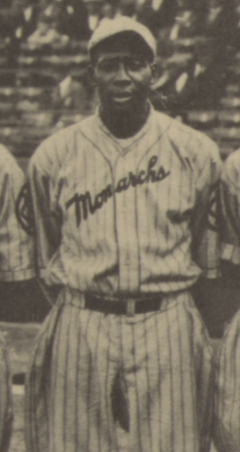
Bullet Rogan

==== Leroy "Satchel" Paige Legacy Award ====
The Satchel Paige Legacy Award was given annually to the best pitchers in the National and American leagues.

- 2001: Roger Clemens (Yankees; AL)
- 2002: Randy Johnson (Diamondbacks; NL) and Barry Zito (Athletics; AL)
- 2003:
- 2004: Roger Clemens (Astros; NL) and Johan Santana (Twins; AL)
- 2005: Dontrelle Willis (Marlins; NL) and Johan Santana (Twins; AL)

==== Wilbur "Bullet" Rogan Legacy Award ====
The Wilbur "Bullet" Rogan Legacy Award is given annually to the "Pitchers of the Year" in the National and American leagues.

- 2006: Brandon Webb (Diamondbacks; NL)and Johan Santana (Twins; AL)
- 2007: Jake Peavy (Padres; NL) and CC Sabathia (Indians; AL)
- 2008:
- 2009: Chris Carpenter (Cardinals; NL) and Zack Greinke (Royals; AL)
- 2010: Roy Halladay (Phillies; NL) and CC Sabathia (Yankees; AL)
- 2011: Clayton Kershaw (Dodgers; NL) and Justin Verlander (Tigers; AL)
- 2012: R. A. Dickey (Mets; NL) and David Price (Rays; AL)
- 2013:
- 2014:
- 2015:
- 2016: Max Scherzer (Nationals; NL) and Rick Porcello (Red Sox; AL)
- 2017:

=== Larry Doby Legacy Award ===
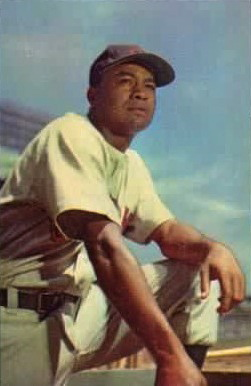
Larry Doby

Note: This should not be confused with the Larry Doby Award, which is presented to the MLB "Futures Game" MVP.

The Larry Doby Legacy Award is given annually to the "Rookies of the Year" in the National and American leagues.

- 2001:
- 2002: Jason Jennings (Rockies; NL) and Eric Hinske (Blue Jays; AL)
- 2003:
- 2004: Khalil Greene (Padres; NL) and Bobby Crosby (Athletics; AL)
- 2005: Ryan Howard (Phillies; NL) and Robinson Cano (Yankees; AL)
- 2006: Ryan Zimmerman (Nationals; NL) and Justin Verlander (Tigers; AL)
- 2007: Troy Tulowitzki (Rockies; NL) and Dustin Pedroia (Red Sox; AL)
- 2008:
- 2009: Andrew McCutchen (Pirates; NL) and Elvis Andrus (Rangers; AL)
- 2010: Buster Posey (Giants; NL) and Neftalí Feliz (Rangers; AL)
- 2011: Craig Kimbrel (Braves; NL) and Eric Hosmer (Royals; AL)
- 2012: Bryce Harper (Nationals; NL) and Mike Trout (Angels: AL)
- 2013:
- 2014:
- 2015:
- 2016: Corey Seager (Dodgers; NL) and Michael Fulmer (Tigers; AL)
- 2017:

=== Hilton Smith Legacy Award ===
The Hilton Smith Legacy Award is given annually to the "Relievers of the Year" in the National and American leagues.

- 2002: John Smoltz (Braves; NL) and Eddie Guardado (Twins; AL)
- 2003:
- 2004: Jason Isringhausen (Cardinals; NL), Armando Benítez (Marlins; NL), and Mariano Rivera (Yankees; AL)
- 2005: Chad Cordero (Nationals; NL), and Bob Wickman (Indians; AL)
- 2006: Trevor Hoffman (Padres; NL) and Francisco Rodríguez (Angels; AL)
- 2007: José Valverde (Diamondbacks; NL) and Joe Borowski (Indians; AL)
- 2008:
- 2009: Heath Bell (Padres; NL) and Brian Fuentes (Angels; AL)
- 2010: Brian Wilson (Giants; NL) and Rafael Soriano (Rays; AL)
- 2011: Craig Kimbrel (Braves; NL) (tie), John Axford (Brewers; NL) (tie), and José Valverde (Tigers; AL)
- 2012: tie – Jason Motte (Cardinals; NL), Craig Kimbrel (Braves; NL) and Jim Johnson (Orioles; AL)
- 2013:
- 2014:
- 2015:
- 2016: Jeurys Familia (Mets; NL) and Zach Britton (Orioles; AL)
- 2017:

=== Walter "Buck" Leonard Legacy Award ===
The Walter "Buck" Leonard Legacy Award is given annually to the batting champions in the National and American leagues.

- 2001: Larry Walker (Rockies; NL)
- 2002: Barry Bonds (Giants; NL) and Manny Ramirez (Red Sox; AL)
- 2003:
- 2004: Barry Bonds (Giants; NL) and Ichiro Suzuki (Mariners; AL)
- 2005: Derrek Lee (Cubs; NL) and Michael Young (Rangers; AL)
- 2006: Freddy Sanchez (Pirates; NL) and Joe Mauer (Twins; AL)
- 2007: Matt Holliday (Rockies; NL) and Magglio Ordóñez (Tigers; AL)
- 2008: Chipper Jones (Braves; NL)
- 2009: Hanley Ramírez (Marlins; NL) and Joe Mauer (Twins; AL)
- 2010: Carlos González (Rockies; NL) and Josh Hamilton (Rangers; AL)
- 2011: Jose Reyes (Mets; NL) and Miguel Cabrera (Tigers; AL)
- 2012: Buster Posey (Giants; NL) and Miguel Cabrera (Tigers; AL)
- 2013:
- 2014:
- 2015:
- 2016: DJ LeMahieu (Rockies, NL) and Jose Altuve (Astros; AL)
- 2017:

=== Josh Gibson Legacy Award ===
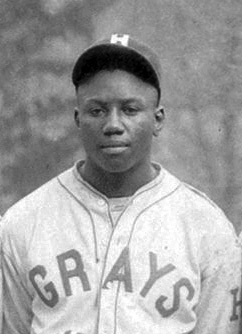
Josh Gibson

The Josh Gibson Legacy Award is given annually to the "Home Run" leaders in the National and American leagues.

- 2001: Barry Bonds (Giants; NL) and Alex Rodriguez (Rangers; AL)
- 2001: Alex Rodriguez (Rangers; AL)
- 2002: Sammy Sosa (Cubs; NL) and Alex Rodriguez (Rangers; AL)
- 2003: Alex Rodriguez (Rangers; AL)
- 2004: Adrián Beltré (Dodgers; NL) and Manny Ramirez (Red Sox; AL)
- 2005: Andruw Jones (Braves; NL) and Alex Rodriguez (Yankees; AL)
- 2006: Ryan Howard (Phillies; NL) and David Ortiz (Red Sox; AL)
- 2007: Prince Fielder (Brewers; NL) and Alex Rodriguez (Yankees; AL)
- 2008: Ryan Howard (Phillies; NL)
- 2009: Albert Pujols (Cardinals; NL), Carlos Peña (Rays; AL) (tie), and Mark Teixeira (Yankees; AL) (tie)
- 2010: Albert Pujols (Cardinals) and José Bautista (Blue Jays; AL)
- 2011: Matt Kemp (Los Angeles Dodgers; NL) and José Bautista (Blue Jays; AL)
- 2012: Ryan Braun (Brewers; NL) and Miguel Cabrera (Tigers; AL)
- 2013:
- 2014:
- 2015:
- 2016: Chris Carter (right-handed hitter) (Brewers; NL) (tie), Nolan Arenado (Rockies; NL) (tie), and Mark Trumbo (Orioles; AL)
- 2017:

=== James "Cool Papa" Bell Legacy Award ===
The James "Cool Papa" Bell Legacy Award is given annually to the "Stolen Base" leaders in the National and American leagues.

- 2001: Juan Pierre (Rockies; NL) (tie), and Jimmy Rollins (Phillies; NL) (tie)
- 2002: Luis Castillo (Marlins; NL) and Alfonso Soriano (Yankees; AL)
- 2003:
- 2004: Carl Crawford (Devil Rays; AL) and Scott Podsednik (White Sox; AL)
- 2005: Jose Reyes (Mets; NL) and Chone Figgins (Angels; AL)
- 2006: Jose Reyes (Mets; NL) and Carl Crawford (Devil Rays; AL)
- 2007: Jose Reyes (Mets; NL), Carl Crawford (Devil Rays; AL) (tie), and Brian Roberts (Orioles; AL) (tie)
- 2008:
- 2009: Michael Bourn (Astros; NL) and Jacoby Ellsbury (Red Sox; AL)
- 2010: Michael Bourn (Astros; NL) and Juan Pierre (White Sox; AL)
- 2011: Michael Bourn (Braves; NL), Coco Crisp (Athletics; AL) (tie), and Brett Gardner (Yankees) (tie)
- 2012: Everth Cabrera (Padres; NL) and Mike Trout (Angels; AL)
- 2013:
- 2014:
- 2015:
- 2016: Jonathan Villar (Brewers; NL) and Rajai Davis (Indians; AL)
- 2017:

=== Charles Isham "C. I." Taylor Legacy Award ===
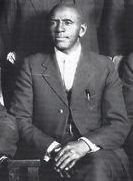
C. I. Taylor

The Charles Isham "C. I." Taylor Legacy Award is given annually to the "Managers of the Year" in the National and American leagues.

- 2000: Dusty Baker (Giants; NL)
- 2001:
- 2002: Tony La Russa (Cardinals; NL) and Mike Scioscia (Angels; AL)
- 2003: Dusty Baker (Cubs; NL)
- 2004: Tony La Russa (Cardinals; NL) and Buck Showalter (Rangers; AL)
- 2005: Bobby Cox (Braves; NL) and Ozzie Guillen (White Sox; AL)
- 2006: Willie Randolph (Mets; NL) and Jim Leyland (Tigers; AL)
- 2007: Bob Melvin (Diamondbacks; NL) and Eric Wedge (Indians; AL)
- 2008:
- 2009: Jim Tracy (Rockies; NL) and Mike Scioscia (Angels; AL)
- 2010: Dusty Baker (Reds; NL) and Ron Washington (Rangers; AL)
- 2011: Kirk Gibson (Diamondbacks; NL) and Ron Washington (Rangers; AL)
- 2012: Dusty Baker (Reds; NL) and Buck Showalter (Orioles; AL)
- 2013:
- 2014:
- 2015: Joe Maddon (Cubs; NL) and Ned Yost (Royals; AL)
- 2016: Dave Roberts (outfielder) (Dodgers; NL) and Terry Francona (Indians; AL)
- 2017:

=== Andrew "Rube" Foster Legacy Award ===
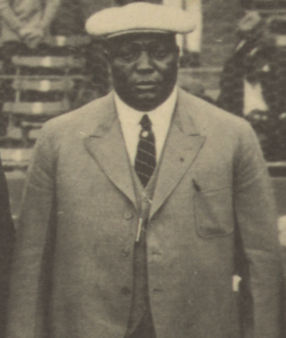
Rube Foster

The Andrew "Rube" Foster Legacy Award is given annually to the "Executives of the Year" in the National and American leagues.

- 2000:
- 2001: Pat Gillick (Mariners; AL)
- 2002: John Schuerholz (Braves; NL) and Bill Stoneman (Angels; AL)
- 2003:
- 2004: Walt Jocketty (Cardinals; NL) and Terry Ryan (Twins; AL)
- 2005: John Schuerholtz (Braves; NL) and Kenny Williams (White Sox; AL)
- 2006: Omar Minaya (Mets; NL) and Terry Ryan (Twins; AL)
- 2007: Dan O'Dowd (Rockies; NL) and Mark Shapiro (Indians; AL)
- 2008: Tony Reagins (Angels; AL)
- 2009: Dan O'Dowd (Rockies; NL) and Jack Zduriencik (Mariners: AL)
- 2010: Brian Sabean (Giants; NL) and Jon Daniels (Rangers; AL)
- 2011: Doug Melvin (Brewers; NL) and Dave Dombrowski (Tigers; AL)
- 2012: John Mozeliak (Cardinals; NL) and Billy Beane (A's; AL)
- 2013:
- 2014:
- 2015: Neal Huntington (Pirates; NL) and Dayton Moore (Royals; AL)
- 2016: Theo Epstein (Cubs; NL) and Mike Chernoff (baseball) (Indians; AL)
- 2017:

=== Kansas City Monarchs Legacy Award ===
The Kansas City Monarchs Legacy Award is given annually to the Royals player and/or pitcher of the year.

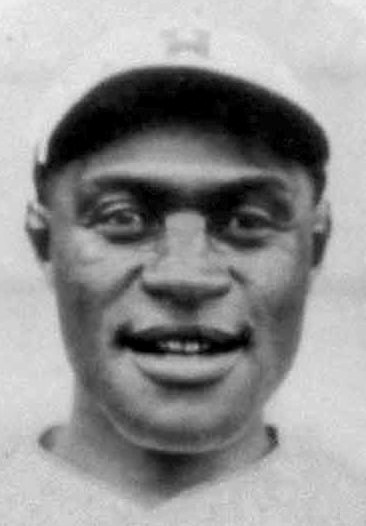
John Henry Lloyd

- 2015: Lorenzo Cain
- 2016: Eric Hosmer and Danny Duffy

=== John Henry "Pop" Lloyd Legacy Award ===
The John Henry "Pop" Lloyd Legacy Award is given annually in recognition of "Baseball and Community Leadership".

- 2007: Jimmie Lee Solomon (executive vice president of baseball operations, Major League Baseball)
- 2008:
- 2009: Mike Cameron (Milwaukee Brewers)
- 2010:
- 2011: Michael Young (Rangers)
- 2012: Adam Jones (Orioles)

=== Sam Lacy Legacy Award ===
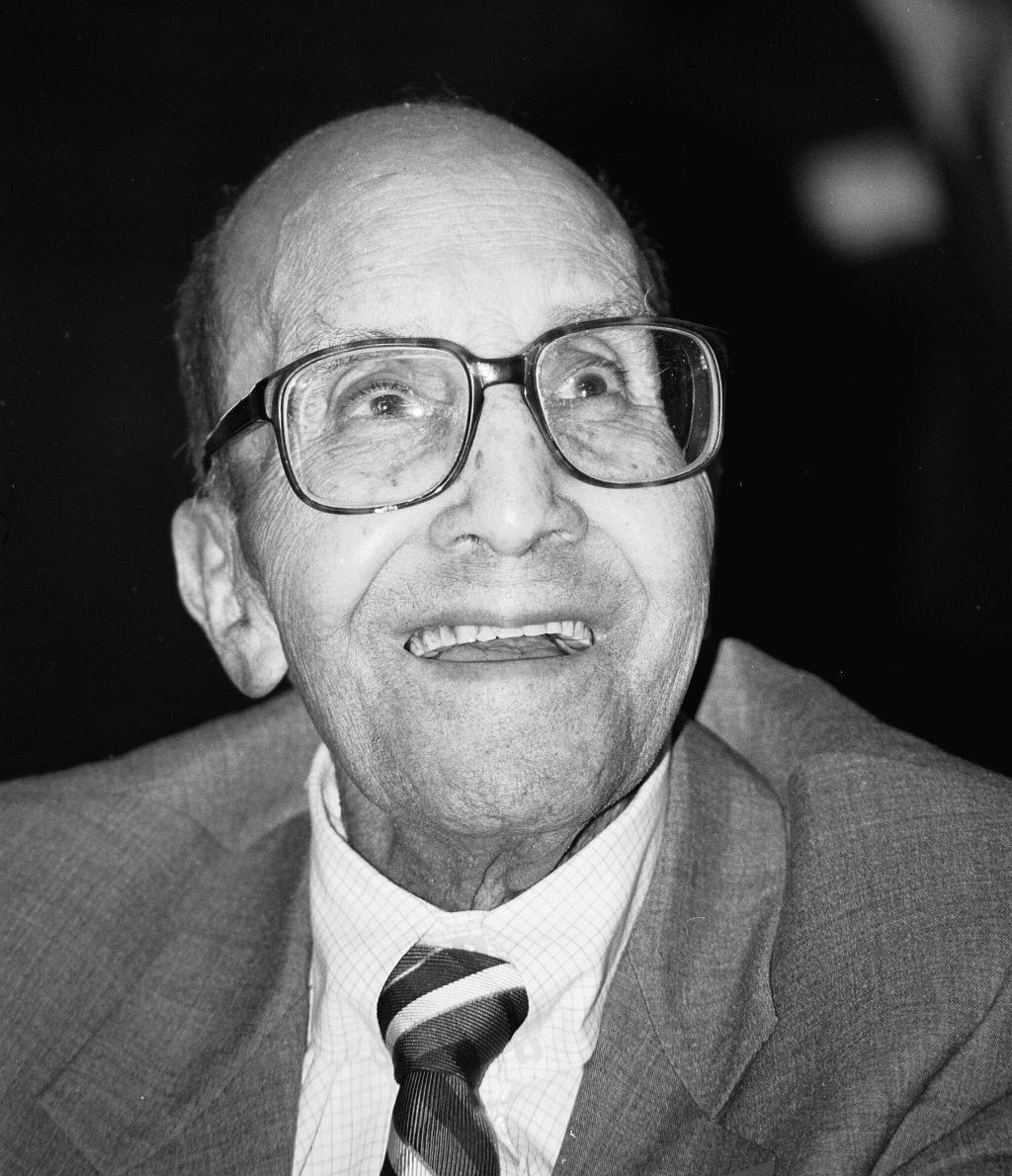
Sam Lacy

The Sam Lacy Legacy Award is given annually to the "Baseball Writer of the Year".

- 2007: Larry Whiteside (Boston Globe) (posthumously)
- 2008: Chris Murray, The Philadelphia Tribune <MLB.com>
- 2009: Claire Smith (ESPN)
- 2010:
- 2011: La Velle E. Neal, III (Minneapolis Star-Tribune)
- 2012: Harold Reynolds (MLB.com)

=== Jackie Robinson Lifetime Achievement Award ===
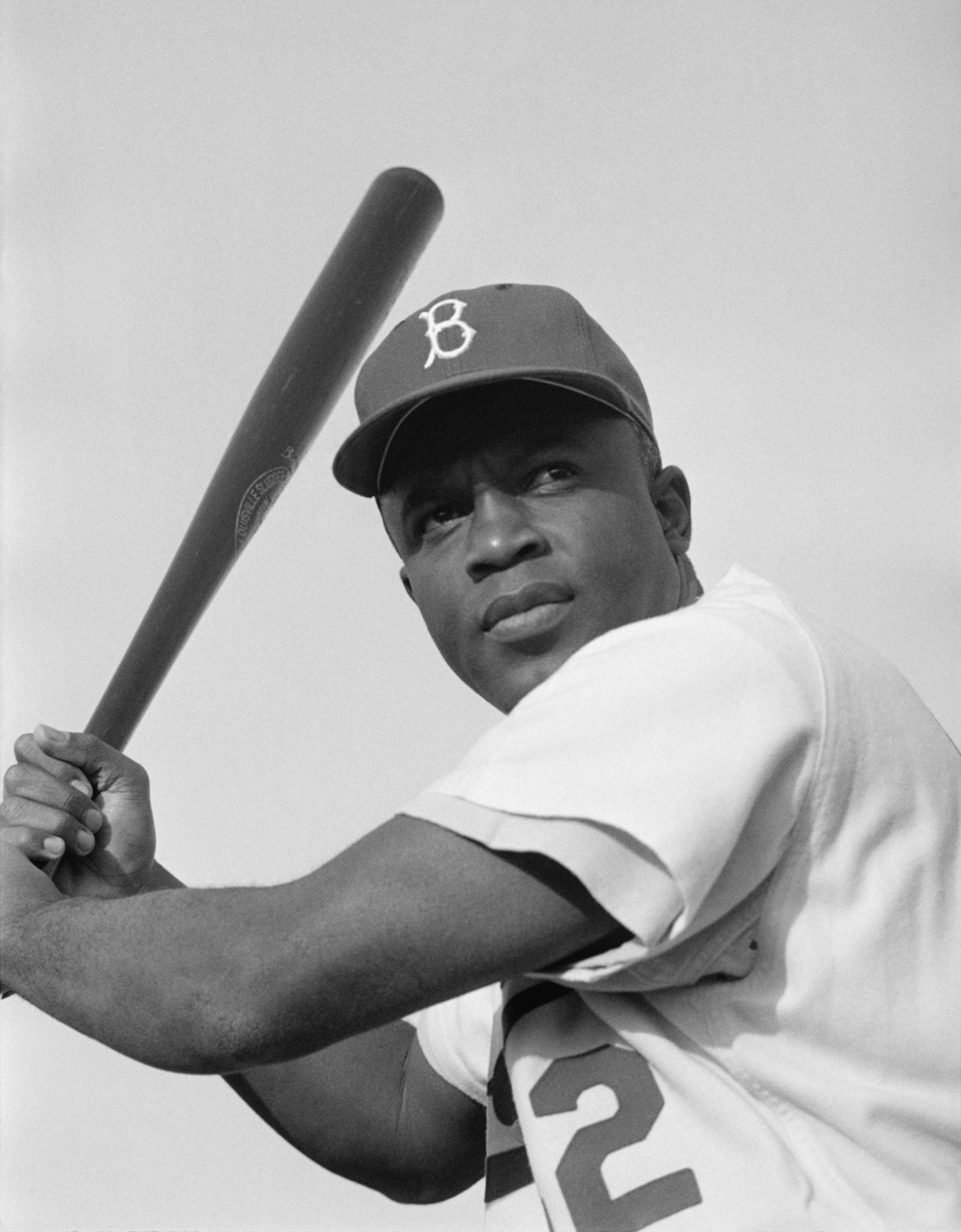
Jackie Robinson

The Jackie Robinson Lifetime Achievement Award is given annually for "Career Excellence in the Face of Adversity".

- 2002: Hank Aaron and Frank Robinson (manager of the Montreal Expos and the first African-American manager in the major leagues)
- 2003:
- 2004: Rachel Robinson (educator, philanthropist, and widow of Jackie Robinson)
- 2005: Bob Watson vice-president of on-field operations for the Major League Baseball
- 2006: Don Newcombe (former Negro leagues and Major League great)
- 2007: Orestes "Minnie" Minoso (first black player to play for the White Sox, in 1951)
- 2008:
- 2009: Joe Morgan (baseball analyst, ESPN; former Major League player)
- 2010: Frank White (baseball broadcast analyst; former Kansas City Royals infielder)
- 2011: Lou Brock (Baseball Hall of Famer)
- 2012: Charley Pride (Country Music Hall of Famer and former Negro leagues player)
- 2013:
- 2014:
- 2015:
- 2016:
- 2017: Dave Stewart (baseball) (former Major League pitcher, coach, executive, agent, broadcaster)
- 2018:
- 2019: Sharon Robinson (author, educator, and daughter of Jackie Robinson)

=== John "Buck" O'Neil Legacy Award ===
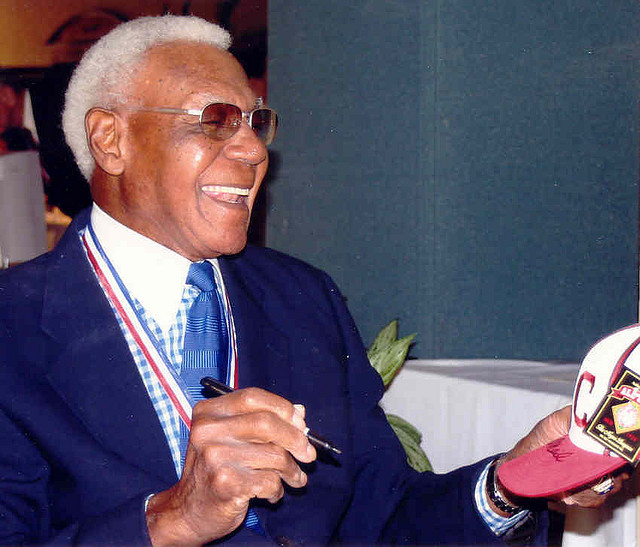
Buck O'Neil

The Buck O'Neil Legacy Award is given annually to a local or national corporate/private philanthropist for "Outstanding Support of the NLBM".

- 2002: Bruce Boeger (regional director, Lincoln-Mercury) and Joe Sorrentino (senior account executive, Pepsi)
- 2003:
- 2004:
- 2005: Dan Glass (President, Kansas City Royals) and Dave Winfield (Vice President/Senior Advisor, San Diego Padres)
- 2006: Ralph Reid (vice president, Corporate Social Responsibility, Sprint Nextel Corporation) and Larry Stewart (chairman, ServiceMark Telecom)
- 2007: Spence Heddens (Kansas City Market President, Bank of America) and Jim Kenney (agency field executive, State Farm Insurance Companies)
- 2008:
- 2009: Bud Selig (commissioner, Major League Baseball)
- 2010:
- 2011: Ollie Gates (owner, Gates & Sons Bar-B-Q) and JE Dunn Construction Company
- 2012: Joe Posnanski (sportswriter), and James B. Nutter & Co. (Kansas City business)
- 2013: Bob Page (President/CEO of University of Kansas Hospital), and Rick Sutcliffe (pitcher and broadcaster)
- 2014:
- 2015: Chicago White Sox and Emanuel Cleaver (U.S Congressman)
- 2016:
- 2017: Frank White and Randall Ferguson, Jr. (civic leader)

== See also ==
- Baseball awards § United States
- List of MLB awards
