= Negro Leagues Baseball Museum =

Museum in Kansas City, Missouri, U.S.

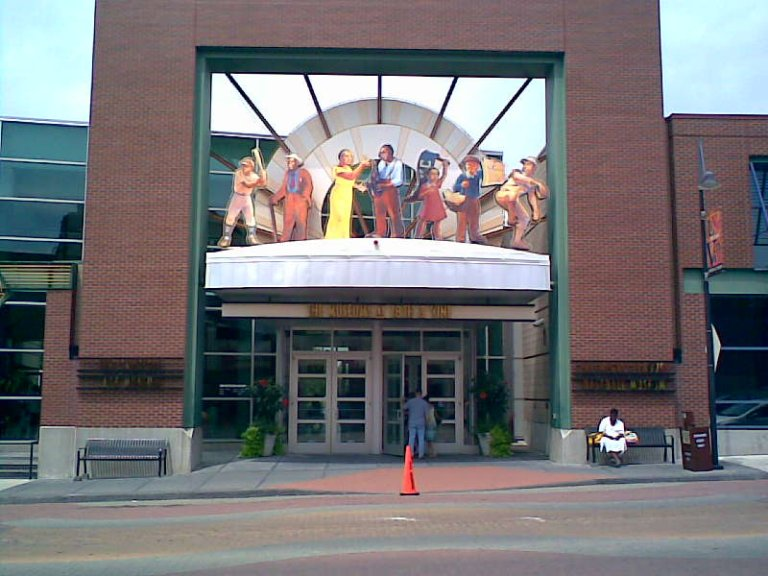
- Established: 1990
- Location: Kansas City, Missouri
- Coordinates: 39.0914°N 94.5627°W
- Type: Professional sports
- Website: www.nlbm.com

The Negro Leagues Baseball Museum (NLBM) is a privately funded museum dedicated to preserving the history of Negro league baseball in America. It was founded in 1990 in Kansas City, Missouri, in the historic 18th & Vine District, the hub of African-American cultural activity in Kansas City during the first half of the 20th century. The NLBM shares its building with the American Jazz Museum.

== History ==
The Negro Leagues Baseball Museum was founded in 1990 by a group of former Negro league baseball players, including Kansas City Monarchs outfielder Alfred Surratt, Buck O'Neil, Larry Lester, Phil S. Dixon and Horace Peterson.

It moved from its original small, single-room office inside the Lincoln Building at historic 18th & Vine Streets in Kansas City to a 2,000-square-foot (190 m^{2}) space in 1994. Three years later, in 1997, the museum relocated again, to a 10,000-square-foot (930 m^{2}), purpose-built structure five times the previous size.

The museum was on the verge of financial collapse in 2008 before rebounding with stronger leadership and greater engagement with the community. Bob Kendrick took over as President in 2011. By 2012, the museum experienced a profit of $300,000, its most successful year since 2007.

An advance screening of the movie 42, a biographical film about the life of Jackie Robinson, who played for the Kansas City Monarchs prior to breaking baseball's color barrier, was held in Kansas City on April 11, 2013, a day before its nationwide release, as a benefit for the NLBM. Actor Harrison Ford, one of the stars of the film, participated in the fundraiser.

In June 2019, the Negro Leagues Baseball Museum was awarded the Gold American Award for Nonprofit Organization of the Year from the American Business Awards.

== Exhibits ==
The museum chronologically charts the progress of the Negro leagues with informative placards and interactive exhibits. Its walls are lined with pictures of players, owners, and officials of Negro league baseball from the Negro National League of 1920 through the Negro American League which lasted until 1962. As visitors progress through the exhibit, they move forward in time through the history of Black baseball. In one area of the museum, there are lockers set up for some of the legends of the Negro leagues. One can see game-worn uniforms, cleats, gloves, and other artifacts from stars such as Josh Gibson, the "Black Babe Ruth."

An impressive aspect of the museum is the Field of Legends. Separated from the visitor at the entrance by chicken wire, it is accessible only at the end of the tour. One can walk onto a field adorned by nearly life-sized bronze statues of twelve figures from Negro league history. Crouching behind the plate is Gibson, one of the most prolific hitters in baseball history, a man who allegedly hit over 80 home runs in one season. At first base is another Baseball Hall of Famer, Buck Leonard, a teammate of Gibson's with the Homestead Grays. At second base is John Henry Lloyd, Judy Johnson monitors shortstop, while Ray Dandridge holds down third base. In the outfield are Cool Papa Bell, Oscar Charleston, and Leon Day. On the mound is perhaps the most famous Negro leaguer of all time, Satchel Paige, who became a rookie in the major leagues at age 42 in 1948. At the plate is Martín Dihigo, the only man to be inducted into the Halls of Fame in three countries: Mexico, Cuba, and the United States. Other statues commemorate Rube Foster, the founder of the first Negro National League, and Buck O'Neil, a former Kansas City Monarch and a member of the board of the museum until his October 6, 2006, death.

On November 13, 2012, the family of Buck O'Neil donated two items to the museum in honor of what would have been his 101st birthday. O'Neil's Presidential Medal of Freedom—awarded posthumously by President George W. Bush—was donated. Also given to the museum was a miniature replica of the Buck O' Neil statue which is displayed at the National Baseball Hall of Fame and Museum. The items are showcased in a special area of the NLBM dedicated to O'Neil.

=== The Geddy Lee Collection ===
On June 5, 2008, Geddy Lee (of the Canadian band Rush), himself an avid baseball fan, donated nearly 200 autographed baseballs to the NLBM. The signatures on these baseballs include names such as Hank Aaron, Cool Papa Bell, and Lionel Hampton. At the time, Geddy Lee's gift was one of the largest single donations the NLBM had ever received.

== Awards ==
Each year, the museum presents the following awards:

- Oscar Charleston Legacy Award – "Most Valuable Players" in the National (NL) and American (AL) leagues
- Pitcher of the Year – "Pitchers of the Year" in the NL and AL:
  - Leroy "Satchel" Paige Legacy Award (2000–2005)
  - Wilbur "Bullet" Rogan Legacy Award (2006–present)
- Larry Doby Legacy Award – "Rookies of the Year" in the NL and AL
- Hilton Smith Legacy Award – "Relievers of the Year" in the NL and AL
- Walter "Buck" Leonard Legacy Award – batting champions in the NL and AL
- Josh Gibson Legacy Award – "Home Run" leaders in the NL and AL
- James "Cool Papa" Bell Legacy Award – "Stolen Base" leaders in the NL and AL
- Charles Isham "C. I." Taylor Legacy Award – "Managers of the Year" in the NL and AL
- Andrew "Rube" Foster Legacy Award – "Executives of the Year" in the NL and AL
- John Henry "Pop" Lloyd Legacy Award – in recognition of "Baseball and Community Leadership"
- Sam Lacy Legacy Award – "Baseball Writer of the Year"
- Jackie Robinson Lifetime Achievement Award – for "Career Excellence in the Face of Adversity"
- John "Buck" O'Neil Legacy Award – to a local or national corporate/private philanthropist for "Outstanding Support of the NLBM"
- Hall of Game Award – Former Major League Baseball stars

== See also ==
- List of museums focused on African Americans
