= List of career achievements by Babe Ruth =

This page details statistics, records, and other achievements pertaining to Babe Ruth. At the time in which Babe Ruth played, some of baseball's modern awards did not exist. The Division Series and League Championship Series did not exist. Until 1931, players who had already won the MVP award were ineligible to win it a second time. The MLB All-Star Game did not exist until 1933, late in Ruth's career. At the time of his retirement, Ruth held many of baseball's most esteemed records, including the career records for home runs (714 — since broken), slugging percentage (0.690), runs batted in (2,213 — since broken), bases on balls (2,062 — since broken) and on-base plus slugging (1.164), among many others.

Ruth in 1942

Ruth also held numerous World Series records at the time of his retirement, all of which have since been broken, including the records for most appearances (10), championships (7), home runs (15), runs batted in (30), runs scored (37), bases on balls (33), highest slugging percentage (0.744), and lowest earned run average (0.87).

== Career statistics ==
=== Regular season ===
Batting

Note: All-time MLB leader in category is in bold.

Category	G	AB	R	H	2B	3B	HR	TB	XBH	RBI	SB	BB	AVG	OBP	SLG	OPS	FLG%	WAR	Ref.
Total	2503	8399	2174	2873	506	136	714	5793	1356	2214	123	2062	.342	.474	**.690**	**1.164**	.968	**182.6**	

- Ruth recorded 10 seasons with a .300 batting average, 40 home runs, 100 RBIs, 100 runs, and 100 walks, the most in MLB history; no other player has recorded more than six such seasons.

Pitching

Category	G	GS	W	L	W-L%	ERA	CG	SHO	IP	H	R	ER	HR	BB	SO	FIP	WHIP	Ref.
Total	163	147	94	46	.671	2.28	107	17	1221.1	974	400	309	10	441	488	2.81	1.159	

- In 1916, Ruth was the AL ERA champion, led the league with 9 shutouts pitched, and finished third in wins (23). He also struck out 170 batters without allowing a home run, which remains a Red Sox franchise record for the most strikeouts in a season without surrendering a home run and ranks fifth in MLB history. In 1917, he led the majors with 35 completed games and finished second in the AL with 24 wins.

=== World Series ===
Batting

Apps	G	AB	R	H	2B	3B	HR	TB	XBH	RBI	SB	BB	AVG	OBP	SLG	OPS	FLG%	Ref.
10	41	129	37	42	5	2	15	96	22	33	4	33	.326	.470	.744	1.214	.977	

- Ruth holds the World Series record with four multi-home run games and remains the only player to hit three home runs in a World Series game twice.

Pitching

G	GS	W	L	W-L%	ERA	CG	SHO	IP	H	R	ER	HR	BB	SO	FIP	WHIP	Ref.
3	3	3	0	1.000	0.87	2	1	31	19	3	3	1	10	8	3.24	.935	

- Ruth set the pitching record of 29 2/3 consecutive scoreless innings in the World Series – a record he held for 43 seasons. He remains the youngest pitcher in Red Sox history to start a postseason game, at 21 years and 246 days old.

== Achievements ==
=== National ===
- Presidential Medal of Freedom (2018)
- American Legion Distinguished Service Medal (1949)

=== MLB ===
- 2× All-Star (1933, 1934)
- 7× World Series champion (1915, 1916, 1918, 1923, 1927, 1928, 1932)
- 1923 AL MVP (unanimous)
- AL batting champion (1924)
- 12× AL home run champion (1918–1921, 1923, 1924, 1926–1931)
  - 11× MLB home run leader (1918–1921, 1923, 1924, 1926–1929, 1931)
- 6× AL RBI champion (1919–1921, 1923, 1926, 1928)
  - 6× MLB RBI leader (1919–1921, 1923, 1926, 1928)
- 8× AL runs leader (1919–1921, 1923, 1924, 1926–1928)
  - 8× MLB runs leader (1919–1921, 1923, 1924, 1926–1928)
- 6× AL total bases leader (1919, 1921, 1923, 1924, 1926, 1928)
  - 6× MLB total bases leader (1919, 1921, 1923, 1924, 1926, 1928)
- 13× AL slugging percentage leader (1918–1924, 1926–1931)
  - 12× MLB slugging percentage leader (1918–1921, 1923, 1924, 1926–1931)
- 10× AL on-base percentage leader (1919–1921, 1923, 1924, 1926, 1927, 1930–1932)
  - 10× MLB on-base percentage leader (1919–1921, 1923, 1924, 1926, 1927, 1930–1932)
- 13× AL on-base plus slugging leader (1918–1924, 1926–1931)
  - 11× MLB on-base plus slugging leader (1918–1921, 1923, 1924, 1926–1928, 1930, 1931)
- 10× AL wins above replacement leader (1920, 1921, 1923, 1924, 1926–1931)
  - 6× MLB wins above replacement leader (1921, 1923, 1926, 1927, 1930, 1931)
- AL ERA champion (1916)
- AL adjusted ERA+ leader (1916)
- 2× AL cWPA leader (1916, 1917)
- AL shutouts leader (1916)
- AL hits per nine innings leader (1916)
- AL home runs per nine innings leader (1916)
  - MLB home runs per nine innings leader (1916)
- 4× 50 home run club (1920, 1921, 1927, 1928)
- Pitched a combined no-hitter on June 23, 1917
- William J. Slocum–Jack Lang Award (1931)
- New York Yankees #3 retired
- Monument Park honoree
- Major League Baseball Centennial All-Time Team
- Major League Baseball All-Century Team
- Major League Baseball All-Time Team
- During the MLB Centennial season, Ruth was crowned as the Greatest Right Fielder and Greatest Player Ever (1969)
- April 27, 1947, was designated "Babe Ruth Day" throughout MLB by commissioner Happy Chandler
- The Babe Ruth Home Run Award, named in his honor, was an annual award presented to the previous season's leading home run hitter in the MLB
- The Babe Ruth Award, named in his honor, is given annually to the MLB Postseason MVP (Note: From 1949–2006, the award was given to the World Series MVP.)

=== Hall of Fame ===
- National Baseball Hall of Fame Class of 1936 (inaugural)
- Maryland State Athletic Hall of Fame Class of 1956 (inaugural)
- Boston Red Sox Hall of Fame Class of 1995 (inaugural)
- Ted Williams Museum & Hitters Hall of Fame Class of 1995 (inaugural)
- German-American Hall of Fame Class of 2007 (inaugural)
- World Sports Humanitarian Hall of Fame Class of 2010
- United States Athletics Hall of Fame Class of 2023 (inaugural)
- New York State Baseball Hall of Fame Class of 2023 (inaugural)

=== Achievements ===
- First batter to hit 30 home runs in one season (July 19, 1920)
- First batter to hit 40 home runs in one season (August 6, 1920)
- First batter to hit 50 home runs in a season (September 24, 1920)
- First batter to hit 60 home runs in a season (September 30, 1927)
- First batter to hit 200 home runs in a career (May 12, 1923)
- First batter to hit 300 home runs in a career (September 8, 1925)
- First batter to hit 400 home runs in a career (September 2, 1927)
- First batter to hit 500 home runs in a career (August 11, 1929)
- First batter to hit 600 home runs in a career (August 21, 1931)
- First batter to hit 700 home runs in a career (July 13, 1934)
- First athlete to have an agent (1921)
- Babe Ruth's called shot
- One of nine pitchers in MLB history whose career on the mound spanned at least ten seasons and never once included a losing record (Note: Along with Spud Chandler, Dizzy Dean, Dave Foutz, Joe McGinnity, Andy Pettitte, Deacon Phillippe, Jay Powell, and Urban Shocker.)

== Media honors and rankings ==
- The Year Babe Ruth Hit 104 Home Runs
- The New York Times Athlete of the Year (1920) (Note: Co-winner with Man o' War.)
- National Police Gazette Athlete of the Year (1926)
- William Randolph Hearst Trophy, awarded by a national vote of the American people for Most Popular Athlete (1926)
- Newspaper Enterprise Association Outstanding Star of the Year (1928)
- Ranked #2 Most Popular Athlete of the Day in a poll conducted through 135 U.S. and Canadian newspapers (1928)
- Associated Press Greatest Baseball Player of the Half-Century and #2 Greatest Athlete of the Half-Century (1950)
- Greatest Baseball Player of All Time in a poll of more than 500 sports editors, writers, and broadcasters (1976)
- Greatest Athlete of All Time in a poll of 130 sportswriters and broadcasters (1980)
- Ranked #2 Greatest Athlete of All Time by college sports editors nationwide in the Miller 125 Sports Poll conducted by the Miller Brewing Company in honor of its 125th anniversary (1980)
- The Associated Press reported that Ruth was tied with Muhammad Ali as the most recognized athlete in American history (1993)
- The Los Angeles Times named Ruth the Greatest Athlete of All Time (1995)
- Ranked #1 on The Sporting News list of "Baseball's 100 Greatest Players" (1998)
- Ranked #1 by the Associated Press in 1999 as the Greatest Athlete of the 20th Century
- Ranked #3 on Sports Illustrated's Top 25 Greatest Athletes of the 20th Century (1999)
- Ranked #2 on ESPN SportsCentury's Top North American Athletes of the 20th Century (1999)(only behind Michael Jordan)
- Ranked #1 by the New York Daily News as the Most Dominant Athlete of the 20th Century (2000)
- Ranked #1 by the Chicago Tribune as the Greatest Athlete of the 20th Century (2000)
- Named the DHL Hometown Heroes greatest New York Yankee ever (2006)
- Ranked #1 Greatest Maryland Athlete of All Time by The Baltimore Sun (2012)
- Ranked #2 on The Harris Poll's list of Greatest Athletes of All Time (2015)
- In 2016, Ruth was named ESPN's American Athlete of the Year from 1918 to 1923, and again from 1926 to 1929
- Named by Bleacher Report as the most recognizable athlete in sports history (2018)
- Bleacher Report's Greatest Baseball Player of All Time (2018)
- Ranked #1 by ESPN as the Greatest Baseball Player of All Time (2022)
- Ranked #1 on Complex's list of Greatest MLB Players of All Time (2024)

== All-time statistical ranks ==
- 1st on all-time WAR list: 182.6
- 1st on all-time OPS list: 1.164
- 1st on all-time OPS+ list: 206
- 1st on all-time slugging % list: 0.690
- 1st on all-time wOBA list: .513
- 2nd on all-time on-base % list: .474
- 2nd on all-time At bats per home run list: 11.76
- Tied-2nd on all-time walk-off home runs list: 12 (Note: Tied with Albert Pujols, Jimmie Foxx, Mickey Mantle, Stan Musial, and Frank Robinson.)
- 3rd on all-time RBI list: 2,213
- 3rd on all-time home run list: 714
- 3rd on all-time bases on balls list: 2,062
- 4th on all-time runs list: 2,174 (Tied with Hank Aaron)
- 5th on all-time extra-base hits list: 1,356
- 7th on all-time total bases list: 5,793
- 9th on all-time grand slams list: 16
- 13th on all-time batting average list: .3421

Pitching

- 5th on all-time World Series ERA list: 0.87
- 13th on all-time home runs per nine innings list: 0.0737
- 17th on all-time ERA list: 2.277
- 17th on all-time Win–Loss % list: .6714
- 18th on all-time hits per nine innings list: 7.1774
- 29th on all-time championship win probability added list: 54.01
- 76th on all-time FIP list: 2.806

== Major league records ==
=== Home runs ===
Home runs, career: 714 (708 in AL, 6 in NL)

- Broken by Hank Aaron on April 8, 1974

Home runs, season: 60 (1927)

- Broken by Roger Maris on October 1, 1961

Seasons leading the MLB in home runs: 11, (1918–1921, 1923, 1924, 1926–1929, 1931)

Consecutive seasons leading the MLB in home runs: 4, (twice, 1918–1921, 1926–1929)

- Broken by Ralph Kiner with 6 consecutive seasons from 1947 to 1952

Home runs in a single decade: 467, (1920s)

Seasons with 50 or more home runs: 4, (1920, 1921, 1927, 1928)

- Tied with Mark McGwire and Sammy Sosa

Seasons with 40 or more home runs: 11, (1920, 1921, 1923, 1924, 1926–1932)

Consecutive seasons with 40 or more home runs: 7, (1926–1932)

At bats per home run, career: 11.76

- Broken by Mark McGwire in 1998 (finished career with 10.61)

At bats per home run, season: 8.48 (1920)

- Broken by Mark McGwire, 8.13 (1996)

Most times hitting two or more home runs in a game, career: 72 (71 in AL, 1 in NL)

Longest home run: 575 feet (July 18, 1921)

Most home runs in first five seasons with a team: 235 (1920–1924)

Oldest player to hit three home runs in a game: 40 years, 108 days (May 25, 1935)

- Broken by Stan Musial, 41 years, 229 days (July 8, 1962)

=== Runs batted in ===
Runs batted in, career: 2,213 (2,201 in AL, 12 in NL)

- Broken by Hank Aaron on May 10, 1975

Consecutive seasons leading the MLB in runs batted in: 3, (1919–1921)

- Tied with Cap Anson, Ty Cobb, Rogers Hornsby, Joe Medwick, George Foster, and Cecil Fielder

Consecutive seasons with at least 150 RBI: 3, (1929–1931)

- Tied with Lou Gehrig

=== Runs ===
Seasons leading the MLB in runs scored: 8, (1919–1921, 1923, 1924, 1926–1928)

Consecutive seasons leading the MLB in runs scored: 3, (twice) (1919–1921, 1926–1928)

- Tied with King Kelly, Albert Pujols, Pete Rose, Eddie Collins, Ted Williams, and Mickey Mantle

=== Wins above replacement ===
Wins above replacement, career: 182.6

Single-season wins above replacement, by positional player: 14.1, (1923) (Note: He also ranks second and third all-time with 12.8 in 1921 and 12.6 in 1927.)

Seasons leading the MLB in wins above replacement: 10, (1920, 1921, 1923, 1924, 1926–1931)

Consecutive seasons leading the MLB in wins above replacement: 6, (1926–1931)

=== Slugging percentage ===
Slugging percentage, career: 0.6897

Slugging percentage, season: 0.847 (1920)

- Broken by Barry Bonds, 0.863 (2001)

Seasons leading the MLB in slugging percentage: 12, (1918–1921, 1923, 1924, 1926–1931)

Consecutive seasons leading the MLB in slugging percentage: 6, (1926–1931)

- Tied with Dan Brouthers

=== On-base percentage ===
On-base percentage, career: .474

- Broken by Ted Williams in the 1946 season (finished career with .482)

=== On-base plus slugging ===
On-base plus slugging, career: 1.164

On-base plus slugging, season: 1.379 (1920)

- Broken by Barry Bonds, 1.381 (2002)

Seasons leading the MLB in on-base plus slugging: 11, (1918–1921, 1923, 1924, 1926–1928, 1930, 1931)

=== Total bases ===
Total bases, single season: 457 (1921)

Seasons leading the MLB in total bases: 6, (1919, 1921, 1923, 1924, 1926, 1928)

- Tied with Stan Musial

=== Bases on balls ===
Bases on balls, career: 2,062 (2,042 in AL, 20 in NL)

- Broken by Rickey Henderson on April 25, 2001

=== Hits ===
Extra-base hits, single season: 119 (1921)

=== Other ===
Lowest ratio of hits per nine innings pitched for a left-handed pitcher: 7.1774

- Broken by Sandy Koufax, 6.7916

Highest winning percentage for a left-handed pitcher: 67.14%

- Broken by Lefty Grove, 68.03%

Seasons leading the MLB in annual salary: 13, (1922–1934)

Consecutive seasons leading the MLB in annual salary: 13, (1922–1934)

No-hitter: Boston Red Sox 4, Washington Senators 0, June 23, 1917

- First game of a doubleheader. Ruth and his catcher, Pinch Thomas, were ejected for arguing balls and strikes after walking the first batter, who was then caught stealing. Ernie Shore came on in relief and retired the next 26 in a row for a no-hitter, completely in relief. Catcher Sam Agnew caught for Shore.

== American League records ==
=== Regular season ===
==== Slugging percentage ====
Slugging percentage, career: 0.690

Slugging percentage, season: 0.847 (1920)

Slugging percentage by a lefthander, season: 0.847 (1920)

Seasons leading the AL in slugging percentage: 13 (1918–1924, 1926–1931)

Consecutive seasons leading the AL in slugging percentage: 7, (1918–1924)

=== On-base plus slugging ===
On-base plus slugging, career: 1.1636

On-base plus slugging, season: 1.3791 (1920)

Seasons leading the AL in on-base plus slugging: 13, (1918–1924, 1926–1931)

Consecutive seasons leading the AL in on-base plus slugging: 7, (1918–1924)

==== Runs scored ====
Runs scored, season: 177 (152 games, 1921)

Runs scored by a lefthander, season: 177 (152 games, 1921)

Seasons leading the AL in runs scored: 8 (1919–1921, 1923, 1924, 1926–1928)

Consecutive seasons leading the AL in runs scored: Three, twice

- Three (1919–1921)
- Three (1926–1928)
- Also achieved by Ty Cobb (1909–1911), Eddie Collins (1912–1914), Ted Williams (1940–1942), Mickey Mantle (1956–1958), and Mike Trout (2012–2014)

Seasons with 150 or more runs scored: 6 (1920, 1921, 1923, 1927, 1928, 1930)

==== Doubles ====
Doubles by pitcher, game: 3, at Washington Senators, May 9, 1918 (10 innings)

==== Home runs ====
Home runs, career: 714

Home runs with one club, career: 659, New York Yankees (1920–1934)

Seasons leading the AL in home runs: 12, (1918–1921, 1923, 1924, 1926–1931)

Consecutive seasons leading the AL in home runs: 6, (1926–1931)

Home runs by lefthander, career: 714

Home runs at home by lefthander, season: 32 (1921)

- Tied by Ken Williams in 1922

Home runs on road, season: 32 (1927)

Home runs on road by lefthander, season: 32 (1927)

Seasons hitting home runs in all parks, career: 11 (1919–1921, 1923, 1924, 1926–1931)

Seasons with 50 or more home runs: 4 (1920, 1921, 1927, 1928)

- Tied by Mark McGwire (1996–1999) and Sammy Sosa (1998–2001)

Consecutive seasons with 50 or more home runs: Two, twice

- Two (1920–1921)
- Two (1927–1928)
- Tied by Ken Griffey Jr. (1997–1998) and Alex Rodriguez (2001–2002)

Seasons with 40 or more home runs: 11 (1920, 1921, 1923, 1924, 1926–1932)

Consecutive seasons with 40 or more home runs: 7 (1926–1932)

Seasons with 30 or more home runs: 13 (1920–1924, 1926–1933)

Seasons with 20 or more home runs: 16 (1919–1934)

- Tied by Ted Williams (1939–1942, 1946–1951, 1954–1958, 1960) and Reggie Jackson (1968–1980, 1982, 1984, 1985)

Consecutive seasons with 20 or more home runs: 16 (1919–1934)

Home runs, two consecutive seasons: 114 (60 in 1927, 54 in 1928)

Home runs by lefthander, two consecutive seasons: 114 (60 in 1927, 54 in 1928)

Home runs by lefthander, one month: 17 (September 1927)

Home runs in June: 15 (1930)

- Tied by Bob Johnson in 1934 and Roger Maris in 1961

Home runs through July 31: 41 (1928)

- Tied by Jimmie Foxx in 1932

Home runs in September: 17 (1927)

- Tied by Albert Belle in 1995

Home runs through September 30: 60 (1927)

- Tied by Roger Maris in 1961

Most times hitting three home runs in a doubleheader, career (homering in both games): 7 (1920, 1922, 1926, 1927, 1930, 1933 (2))

Most times hitting two or more home runs in a game, career: 71

Home runs, two consecutive days: 6, May 21, 1930—May 22, 1930

- Ruth played four games over the two-day stretch and did not homer in one of the games.
- Tied by Tony Lazzeri (May 23–24, 1936)

==== Grand slams ====
Grand slams, two consecutive games (homering in each game): 2, twice

- 2, September 27, 1927—September 29, 1927
- 2, August 6, 1929 (second game)—August 7, 1929 (first game)
- Several other players have achieved this once; only Ruth has achieved it twice.

Ultimate grand slams:

- September 24, 1925

==== Total bases ====
Total bases, season: 457 (152 games in 1921)

Total bases by lefthander, season: 457 (152 games in 1921)

Seasons leading the AL in total bases: 6 (1919, 1921, 1923, 1924, 1926, 1928)

- Tied with Ty Cobb (1907–1909, 1911, 1915, 1917) and Ted Williams (1939, 1942, 1946, 1947, 1949, 1951)

Total bases by pitcher, game: 10, at Washington Senators, May 9, 1918 (10 innings)

- 1 single, 3 doubles, 1 triple
- Tied with Snake Wiltse, Red Ruffing and Jack Harshman

==== Extra-base hits ====
Extra-base hits, career: 1,350 (506 doubles, 136 triples, 708 HR)

Extra-base hits, season: 119 (1921)

- 44 doubles, 16 triples, 59 HR

Extra-base hits by lefthander, season: 119 (1921)

- 44 doubles, 16 triples, 59 HR

Seasons leading the AL in extra-base hits: 7 (1918–1921, 1923, 1924, 1928)

Consecutive seasons leading the AL in extra-base hits: 4 (1918–1921)

Extra-base hits by pitcher, game: 4, at Washington Senators, May 9, 1918, (10 innings)

- 3 doubles, 1 triple
- Tied with Snake Wiltse, who achieved the feat in 9 inning

==== Runs batted in ====
Runs batted in, career: 2,202

Seasons leading the AL in runs batted in: 6 (1919–1921, 1923, 1926, 1928)

Consecutive seasons leading the AL in runs batted in: 3 (1919–1921)

- Tied with Ty Cobb (1907–1909) and Cecil Fielder (1990–1992)

Consecutive seasons with 150 or more runs batted in: 3 (1929–1931)

Seasons with 100 or more runs batted in: 13 (1919–1921, 1923, 1924, 1926–1933)

- Broken by Alex Rodriguez in 2010

Runs batted in, month of September: 43, (1927)

==== Bases on balls ====
Bases on balls, career: 2,042

Bases on balls, season: 170 (152 games in 1923)

Bases on balls by lefthander, season: 170 (152 games in 1923)

Seasons leading the AL in bases on balls: 11 (1920, 1921, 1923, 1924, 1926–1928, 1930–1933)

Consecutive seasons leading the AL in bases on balls: 4 (1930–1933)

- Tied by Ted Williams (1946–1949)

Seasons with 100 or more bases on balls: 13 (1919–1921, 1923, 1924, 1926–1928, 1930–1934)

==== Set with Lou Gehrig ====
Two teammates with 40 or more home runs, season: Thrice

- 1927 (Ruth 60, Lou Gehrig 47)
- 1930 (Ruth 49, Gehrig 41)
- 1931 (Ruth 46, Gehrig 46)
- Achieved by several other pairs of teammates since. Ruth and Gehrig were the first, and the only to achieve it three times.

Clubs with three consecutive home runs in inning: Twice

- 4th inning, at Philadelphia Athletics, first game, September 10, 1925 (Bob Meusel, Ruth, Gehrig)
- 7th inning, at Chicago White Sox, May 4, 1929 (Ruth, Gehrig, Meusel)

==== Shutouts ====
Shutouts won or tied by lefthander, season: 9 (1916)

- Tied by Ron Guidry in 1978

== All-Star Game records ==
Plate appearances, inning: 2, 5th inning, July 10, 1934

- Tied with Lou Gehrig (5th inning, July 10, 1934) and Jim Rice (3rd inning, July 6, 1983)

First home run in All-Star Game history: 1 on, off Bill Hallahan, 3rd inning, July 6, 1933

== World Series records ==
Most World Series appearances, career: 10 (1915, 1916, 1918, 1921, 1922, 1923, 1926, 1927, 1928, 1932)

- Tied by Joe DiMaggio (1951)
- Broken by Yogi Berra (1960)

Most World Series titles, career: 7 (1915, 1916, 1918, 1923, 1927, 1928, 1932)

- Broken by Joe DiMaggio (1950)

Most positions played, career: 4 (pitcher, left field, right field, first base)

- Tied by Jackie Robinson (1B, 2B, LF, 3B), Elston Howard (LF, RF, 1B, C), Tony Kubek (LF, 3B, CF, SS), and Pete Rose (RF, LF, 3B, 1B)

Batting average, series: .625 (1928)

- Broken by Billy Hatcher (1990)

Series batting .300 or over: 6 (1921, 1923, 1926, 1927, 1928, 1932)

Longest home run: 530 feet (1926)

- Ruth also hit the second-longest home run: 515 feet (1926)

Home runs, career: 15

- Broken by Mickey Mantle (1964)

Home runs, series: 4 (1926)

- Broken by Reggie Jackson (1977)

Series with three or more home runs: 3 (1923 (3), 1926 (4), 1928 (3))

- Tied by Mickey Mantle (1956 (3), 1960 (3), 1964 (3))

Series with two or more home runs in a game: 4 (1923, 1926, 1928, 1932)

- 2 HR in 1 game twice, 3 HR in 1 game twice

Most home runs, three consecutive series (three consecutive years): 9 (1926 (4), 1927 (2), 1928 (3))

Home runs, game: 3, twice

- 3, at St. Louis Cardinals, October 6, 1926 (2 consecutive)
- 3, at St. Louis Cardinals, October 9, 1928 (2 consecutive)
- Ruth is the only player to achieve this twice.
- Tied by Reggie Jackson (October 18, 1977 vs. Los Angeles Dodgers — each on 1st pitch), Albert Pujols (October 22, 2011 at Texas Rangers), and Pablo Sandoval (October 24, 2012 vs. Detroit Tigers)
- Ruth also homered twice in a World Series game on two occasions (October 11, 1923 and October 1, 1932)

Home runs, two consecutive innings: 2, twice

- 2, 4th and 5th innings, at New York Giants, October 11, 1923
- 2, 7th and 8th innings, at St. Louis Cardinals, October 9, 1928
- Ruth was the first to achieve this. It was next achieved by Ted Kluszewski on October 1, 1959.
- Several other players have achieved this since; only Ruth has achieved it twice.

Runs batted in, career: 30

- Broken by Lou Gehrig (1937)

Runs, career: 37

- Broken by Yogi Berra (1960)

Runs, series: 9 (1928)

- Broken by Reggie Jackson (1977)

Runs, game: 4, at St. Louis Cardinals, October 6, 1926

- Achieved by several other players since; Ruth was the first to achieve this.

Consecutive games scoring one or more runs, career: 9 (1927 (last 2), 1928 (4), 1932 (first 3))

Hits, 4-game series: 10 (1928)

Most times reached first base safely, game (batting 1.000): 5, twice

- 5, at St. Louis Cardinals, October 6, 1926 (3 HR, 2 BB)
- 5, vs. St. Louis Cardinals, October 10, 1926 (1 HR, 4 BB)
- Achieved by several players since then; only Ruth has achieved it twice.

Total bases, career: 96

- Broken by Yogi Berra (1958)

Total bases, 4-game series: 22 (1928)

Total bases, game: 12, twice

- 12, at St. Louis Cardinals, October 6, 1926 (3 HR)
- 12, at St. Louis Cardinals, October 9, 1928 (3 HR)
- Also achieved by Reggie Jackson on October 18, 1977 (3 HR vs. Los Angeles Dodgers)
- Broken by Albert Pujols on October 22, 2011 (3 HR, 2 singles at Texas Rangers)

Extra-base hits, career: 22

- Tied by Yogi Berra (1961)
- Broken by Mickey Mantle (1964)

Extra-base hits, 4-game series: 6 (1928)

Bases on balls, career: 33

- Broken by Mickey Mantle (1962)

Bases on balls, series: 11 (1926)

- Broken by Barry Bonds (2002)

Bases on balls, game: 4, vs. St. Louis Cardinals, October 10, 1926

- Tied with Fred Clarke (Pittsburgh Pirates, October 16, 1909), Doug DeCinces (Baltimore Orioles, October 13, 1979), Dick Hoblitzell (Boston Red Sox, October 9, 1916, 14 innings), Ross Youngs (New York Giants, October 10, 1924, 12 innings), and Jackie Robinson (Brooklyn Dodgers, October 5, 1952, 11 innings)

Slugging percentage, career: 0.744

- Broken by Willie Aikens (1980)

On-base plus slugging, career: 1.214

- Broken by Phil Garner (1979)

Stolen bases, inning: 2, 5th inning, vs. New York Giants, October 6, 1921

- Tied with several other players

Earned run average, career: 0.87

- Broken by Harry Brecheen in 1946

Innings pitched, game: 14, vs. Brooklyn Dodgers, October 9, 1916

- Ruth pitched a complete game victory (won game 2–1)

Consecutive scoreless innings pitched: 29 2/3 innings

- Broken by Whitey Ford October 8, 1961
