= 714 (disambiguation) =

714 may refer to:

- 714, the year AD 714
- 714 BC
- The number 714
- Area code 714 was the telephone area code for most of Southern California beyond Los Angeles County during the 1960s and 1970s. It would later be reduced in size until it essentially only covered portions of Orange County.
- The record number of career home runs held by Babe Ruth until overtaken by Hank Aaron in 1974
- The colloquial name for the recreational drug Methaqualone (Quaalude), originating from the number 714 stamped on the tablets
- The number on the Dragnet (1951 TV series) badge
- "714", a song by Ohio-based band the Godz from their 1979 album "Nothing is Sacred", referencing the colloquial term for Methaqualone

== See also ==
- List of highways numbered 714
