= East-West Major League Baseball Classic =

Major League Baseball exhibition game in honor of Martin Luther King

- Program booklet for the East-West MLB Classic
East	West
5	1
	1	2	3	4	5	6	7	8	9	R	H	E
East	1	1	0	0	0	0	0	3	0	5	9	0
West	0	0	0	0	0	0	0	1	0	1	8	0
- Date: March 28, 1970
- Venue: Dodger Stadium
- City: Los Angeles, California, U.S.
- Managers: Joe DiMaggio (East); Roy Campanella (West)
- MVP: Ron Fairly (Montreal Expos)
- Attendance: 31,694
- Time of game: 2:06
- Ceremonial first pitch: Coretta Scott King

The East-West Major League Baseball Classic, also known as the MLK Game, was a baseball game held on March 28, 1970, in honor of civil rights leader Martin Luther King Jr.. The event was sponsored by the Southern Christian Leadership Conference (SCLC) and at the urging of Major League players in the wake of King's assassination in 1968.

Taking place in Dodger Stadium, the game involved 23 current and future Hall of Famers participating as players, coaches, and managers. Each of the then-24 Major League Baseball teams sent two players and teams were divided up into "East" and "West". The East won the game by 5–1 with Ron Fairly being named MVP of the game. Coretta Scott King, widow of Martin Luther King, was on hand to throw the ceremonial first pitch. Also in attendance was Jackie Robinson, who broke the color barrier in Major League Baseball.

== Background ==
Soon after the assassination of Martin Luther King, a number of major league players wrote to the Southern Christian Leadership Conference (SCLC), asking what they could do to honor the memory of King. In November 1968, Joseph Peters, the sports project director for the SCLC, wrote to William Eckert, then the Commissioner of Baseball:

Shortly after the assassination of Dr. King, many professional players came to SCLC with the question 'What can we do as a memorial to this great man?' After a brief deliberation, SCLC decided that the players could best express their sentiments by playing a game in memory of Dr. King, and the funds raised would be used by SCLC to continue the work of our fallen leader.

Initially meant to held in 1969, the game was postponed to 1970 at the request of the SCLC to allow for more time to prepare and organize. It was announced that the game would be held in Dodger Stadium, with each of the 24 Major League Baseball teams sending out two players. Further, teams were to be divided by Eastern and Western divisions. The proceeds from the game would go to programs of the SCLC and The King Center being established in Atlanta.

Players and managers were selected by the Los Angeles chapter of the Baseball Writers' Association of America. Joe DiMaggio, recently retired from his role as executive and coach for the Oakland Athletics, was chosen as the manager of the East. He subsequently chose Billy Martin, Hank Bauer, John McNamara, and Satchel Paige as his coaches. Roy Campanella was chosen to manager the West and chose Sandy Koufax, Stan Musial, Don Drysdale, Don Newcombe, and Elston Howard as his coaches. Campanella put on his Dodgers jersey for the first time since his last game, before the automobile accident which left him unable to walk.

The "East-West Classic" was revived in 2024, with the MLB aiming to make it an annual fixture. The 2024 exhibition was hosted at Doubleday Field in Cooperstown, New York; the East won the game 5-4. In 2025, the classic is to be played on Juneteenth at Birmingham, Alabama's Rickwood Field.

== Game ==
=== Pre-game ceremonies ===
The game was held on March 28, 1970. During the pre-game ceremonies, a recording of King's "I Have a Dream" speech was played over the Dodger Stadium loudspeakers and remarks were made by Reverend H. H. Brookins, president of the SCLC West, SCLC president Reverend Ralph Abernathy, and by Commissioner Bowie Kuhn. Pitcher Mudcat Grant sang the national anthem and Coretta Scott King threw the first pitch.

In attendance were numerous African-American firsts in Major League Baseball in various capacities: Jackie Robinson, who broke the color barrier in Major League Baseball, attended the game as a spectator; Larry Doby, the first African-American to play in the American League, attended the game in uniform (at the time, he was coach with the Montreal Expos); the home plate umpire was Emmett Ashford, the first African-American umpire in the Major Leagues.

Players voluntarily attended to play in the game despite the fact that spring training was ongoing. Notably, Willie Mays flew from Japan where the San Francisco Giants were playing exhibition games, later saying: "It was too important to pass up."

=== Game play ===
Tom Seaver, starting pitcher for the East, and Bob Gibson, coming in on relief, shut out the West for six innings. Ron Fairly and Ron Santo both hit solo home runs for the East, giving them an early lead. Grant Jackson threw a scoreless seventh before giving up a run to the West. On the top of the eight, Mudcat Grant allowed three runs in the eighth, giving the East the lead: Al Kaline singled to open the inning, Lou Brock doubled to score Kaline, and Roberto Clemente doubled to score Brock.

The East won the game 5–1, with Fairly being named the game's MVP. He was presented the MVP trophy by Coretta Scott King.

== Box score ==
Saturday, March 28, 1970 at Dodger Stadium in Los Angeles, California
Team	1	2	3	4	5	6	7	8	9	R	H	E
**East**	0	0	1	1	0	0	0	3	0	**5**	**9**	**0**
West	0	0	0	0	0	0	0	1	0	**1**	**8**	**0**
WP: Tom Seaver LP: Lew Krausse Jr. Home runs: East: 2–Ron Fairly, Ron Santo; West: None

=== Hitting ===
East	AB	R	H	RBI
Ron Fairly, 1B	3	1	1	1
**Al Kaline**, 1B	2	1	1	0
Reggie Smith, CF	3	0	1	0
Tommie Agee, CF	1	0	0	0
**Frank Robinson**, RF	1	0	0	0
**Lou Brock**, RF–LF	2	1	1	1
**Willie Stargell**, LF	3	0	0	0
**Roberto Clemente**, RF	1	1	1	1
**Ron Santo**, 3B	2	1	2	1
Ken McMullen, 1B	2	0	2	1
**Ernie Banks**, SS	3	0	0	0
Tom Tresh, SS	1	0	0	0
Mike Andrews, 2B	0	0	0	0
Don Buford, 2B	3	0	0	0
Tim McCarver, C	3	0	0	0
Ron Brand, C	1	0	0	0
**Tom Seaver**, P	1	0	0	0
**Bob Gibson**, P	1	0	0	0
Bobby Murcer, PH	1	0	0	0
Grant Jackson, P	0	0	0	0
Vada Pinson, PH	1	0	0	0
Darold Knowles, P	0	0	0	0
**Totals**	**35**	**5**	**9**	**5**

West	AB	R	H	RBI
Maury Wills, SS	4	0	0	0
Sandy Alomar, SS	0	0	0	0
Pete Rose, CF	2	0	0	0
Willie Davis, CF	2	1	1	0
**Henry Aaron**, LF	3	0	0	0
**Reggie Jackson**, RF	2	0	0	0
**Tony Oliva**, RF	1	0	0	0
Mudcat Grant, P	0	0	0	0
Ken Berry, PH	1	0	1	1
Roger Nelson, P	0	0	0	0
**Johnny Bench**, C	3	0	1	0
**Orlando Cepeda**, 1B	2	0	0	0
Tommie Sisk, P	0	0	0	0
Ollie Brown, RF	2	0	1	0
**Joe Morgan**, 2B	3	0	1	0
Tommy Harper, 1B	1	0	1	0
Sal Bando, 3B	4	0	2	0
Don Wilson, P	0	0	0	0
**Willie Mays**, PH	1	0	0	0
Lew Krausse, P	0	0	0	0
Al Downing, P	0	0	0	0
Tommy McCraw, 1B	2	0	0	0
**Totals**	**33**	**1**	**8**	**1**

=== Pitching ===
East	IP	H	R	ER	BB	SO
**Tom Seaver** (W)	3	3	0	0	1	2
**Bob Gibson**	3	1	0	0	0	1
Grant Jackson	2	3	1	1	1	1
Darold Knowles	1	1	0	0	0	1
**Totals**	**9**	**8**	**1**	**1**	**2**	**5**

Note: All future **Hall of Famers** are listed in bold.

West	IP	H	R	ER	BB	SO
Don Wilson	2	2	0	0	2	1
Lew Krausse (L)	2	2	2	2	0	0
Al Downing	1	0	0	0	0	1
Tommie Sisk	2	1	0	0	0	0
Mudcat Grant	1	4	3	3	0	0
Roger Nelson	1	0	0	0	0	1
**Totals**	**9**	**9**	**5**	**5**	**2**	**3**

== See also ==
- Civil Rights Game
