= Major League Baseball Centennial All-Time Teams =

In 1969, Major League Baseball celebrated its centennial with a landmark event: the naming of its first official All-Time Team and an accompanying All-Time "Living" Team, both unveiled at a star-studded banquet on July 21, the night before that year's All-Star Game. For the first time, fans played a central role in the selection process, voting for all-time franchise teams in each major league city, which served as nominees for the national team. Supplemented by ballots from The Sporting News and a panel of writers and broadcasters, finalists were chosen for each position, leading to Oscar-style award presentations at a gala attended by Hall of Famers, current stars, politicians, and celebrities.

At the same event, Babe Ruth was crowned the greatest player of all time, while Joe DiMaggio was honored as the greatest "living" player.

== All-Time Team ==
Greatest All-Time Player – Babe Ruth

- Finalists – Joe DiMaggio and Ty Cobb

| Position | Selected players | Finalists |
|---|---|---|
| Catcher | Mickey Cochrane | Roy Campanella; Bill Dickey |
| First baseman | Lou Gehrig | Stan Musial; George Sisler |
| Second baseman | Rogers Hornsby | Eddie Collins; Charlie Gehringer |
| Third baseman | Pie Traynor | Brooks Robinson; Jackie Robinson |
| Shortstop | Honus Wagner | Ernie Banks; Joe Cronin |
| Right fielder | Babe Ruth | Willie Mays; Tris Speaker; Ted Williams |
| Center fielder | Ty Cobb | Willie Mays; Tris Speaker; Ted Williams |
| Left fielder | Joe DiMaggio | Willie Mays; Tris Speaker; Ted Williams |
| Right-handed pitcher | Walter Johnson | Christy Mathewson; Cy Young |
| Left-handed pitcher | Lefty Grove | Sandy Koufax; Carl Hubbell |
| Manager | John McGraw | Joe McCarthy; Casey Stengel |

== All-Time "Living" Team ==
Greatest "Living" Player – Joe DiMaggio

- Finalists – Ted Williams and Stan Musial

| Position | Selected players | Finalists |
|---|---|---|
| Catcher | Bill Dickey | Yogi Berra; Roy Campanella; Gabby Hartnett |
| First baseman | Stan Musial; George Sisler | Bill Terry |
| Second baseman | Charlie Gehringer | Frank Frisch; Jackie Robinson |
| Third baseman | Pie Traynor | Brooks Robinson; Jackie Robinson |
| Shortstop | Joe Cronin | Luke Appling; Ernie Banks; Lou Boudreau |
| Right fielder | Willie Mays | Hank Aaron; Mickey Mantle; Stan Musial |
| Center fielder | Joe DiMaggio | Hank Aaron; Mickey Mantle; Stan Musial |
| Left fielder | Ted Williams | Hank Aaron; Mickey Mantle; Stan Musial |
| Right-handed pitcher | Bob Feller | Dizzy Dean; Bob Gibson |
| Left-handed pitcher | Lefty Grove | Sandy Koufax; Carl Hubbell; Warren Spahn |
| Manager | Casey Stengel | Walter Alston; Leo Durocher; Joe McCarthy |

== See also ==
- Major League Baseball All-Century Team
- Major League Baseball All-Time Team, a similar team chosen by the Baseball Writers' Association of America in 1997
- 1969 Major League Baseball season
- Latino Legends Team
- Team of the century
- DHL Hometown Heroes
- List of MLB awards
- Baseball awards § United States
- National Baseball Hall of Fame and Museum
