= Civil Rights Game =

Series of Major League Baseball games

- Organized by: Major League Baseball
- First played: 2007
- Last played: 2015
- Most appearances: Chicago White Sox (3)
- Related: Beacon Awards

The Civil Rights Game was an annual game in Major League Baseball (MLB) that honored the history of civil rights in the United States. Its first two playings also marked an unofficial end to the league's spring training. The game was played annually from 2007 through 2015. In conjunction with the Civil Rights Game, MLB annually honored pioneers of civil rights with Beacon Awards.

== History ==
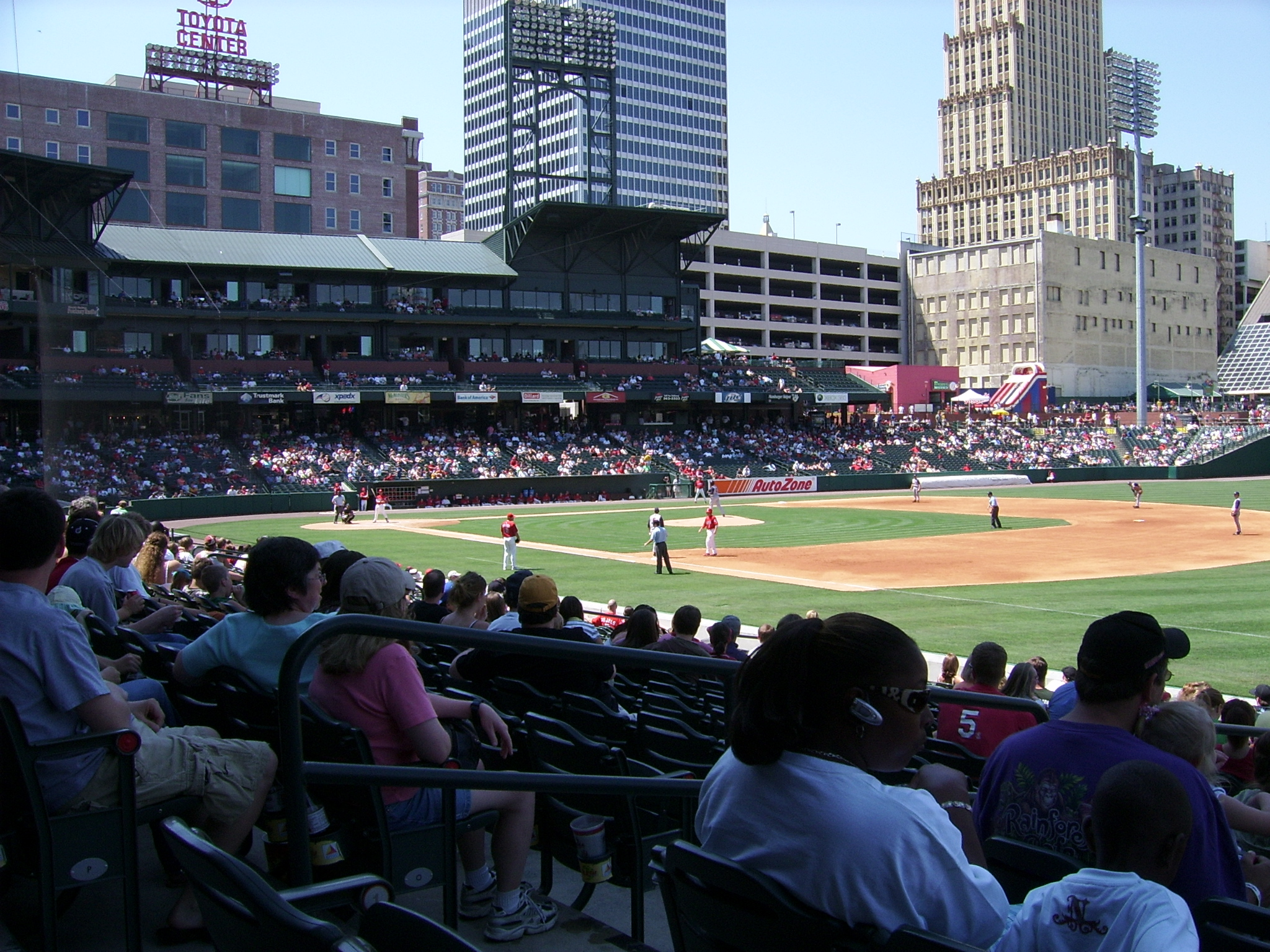
AutoZone Park, ballpark for the first two editions of the game

The first two Civil Rights Games were held at AutoZone Park in Memphis, Tennessee, as preseason contests in 2007 and 2008. The intent of the game was to "embrace baseball's history of African-American players", as well as to generate interest for future black players, after a demographics survey revealed that the percentage of black players in the league has dwindled over the past twelve years to just 8.4 percent. The survey also gave the diversity of players in Major League Baseball an A+ grade: while African-Americans in the sport since 1996 dropped from 17 percent to 8 percent, the percentage of Hispanic players (many of them blacks from the Caribbean) increased during that period from 20 percent to 29 percent, and Asian and other minorities increased from 1 percent to 3 percent. The percentage of non-Hispanic white players went down from 62 percent to 60 percent during that period.

Baseball Commissioner Bud Selig commented on air during the first Civil Rights game that the 8 percent total for African-Americans was "a problem that needed to be looked at." Associated Press news releases related to the game focused on the drop in African-Americans, and quoted former Cleveland pitcher CC Sabathia on the idea that baseball must do more to promote the game in inner cities, saying, "It's not just a problem—it's a crisis."

In 2009, the contest became a regular season game. The game was last staged in 2015, held that season on April 15, the same date that MLB observes Jackie Robinson Day. The game has not been held since the 2015 playing, for unspecified reasons.

== Game results ==
The winning team for each game appears in bold font.

Year	Date	Host city	Stadium	Home team	Score	Visiting team	Attendance	Box
2007†	March 31	Memphis, Tennessee	AutoZone Park	**St. Louis Cardinals**	5–1	Cleveland Indians	12,815	
2008†	March 29	Memphis, Tennessee	AutoZone Park	**New York Mets**	3–2	Chicago White Sox	7,717	
2009	June 20	Cincinnati, Ohio	Great American Ball Park	Cincinnati Reds	8–10	**Chicago White Sox**	42,234	
2010	May 15	Cincinnati, Ohio	Great American Ball Park	**Cincinnati Reds**	4–3	St. Louis Cardinals	41,326	
2011	May 15	Atlanta, Georgia	Turner Field	**Atlanta Braves**	3–2	Philadelphia Phillies	42,117	
2012	August 18	Atlanta, Georgia	Turner Field	Atlanta Braves	2–6	**Los Angeles Dodgers**	42,219	
2013	August 24	Chicago, Illinois	U.S. Cellular Field	**Chicago White Sox**	3–2	Texas Rangers	22,079	
2014	May 30	Houston, Texas	Minute Maid Park	**Houston Astros**	2–1	Baltimore Orioles	38,482	
2015	April 15	Los Angeles, California	Dodger Stadium	**Los Angeles Dodgers**	5–2	Seattle Mariners	51,287	

† Preseason contest

=== Team appearances ===
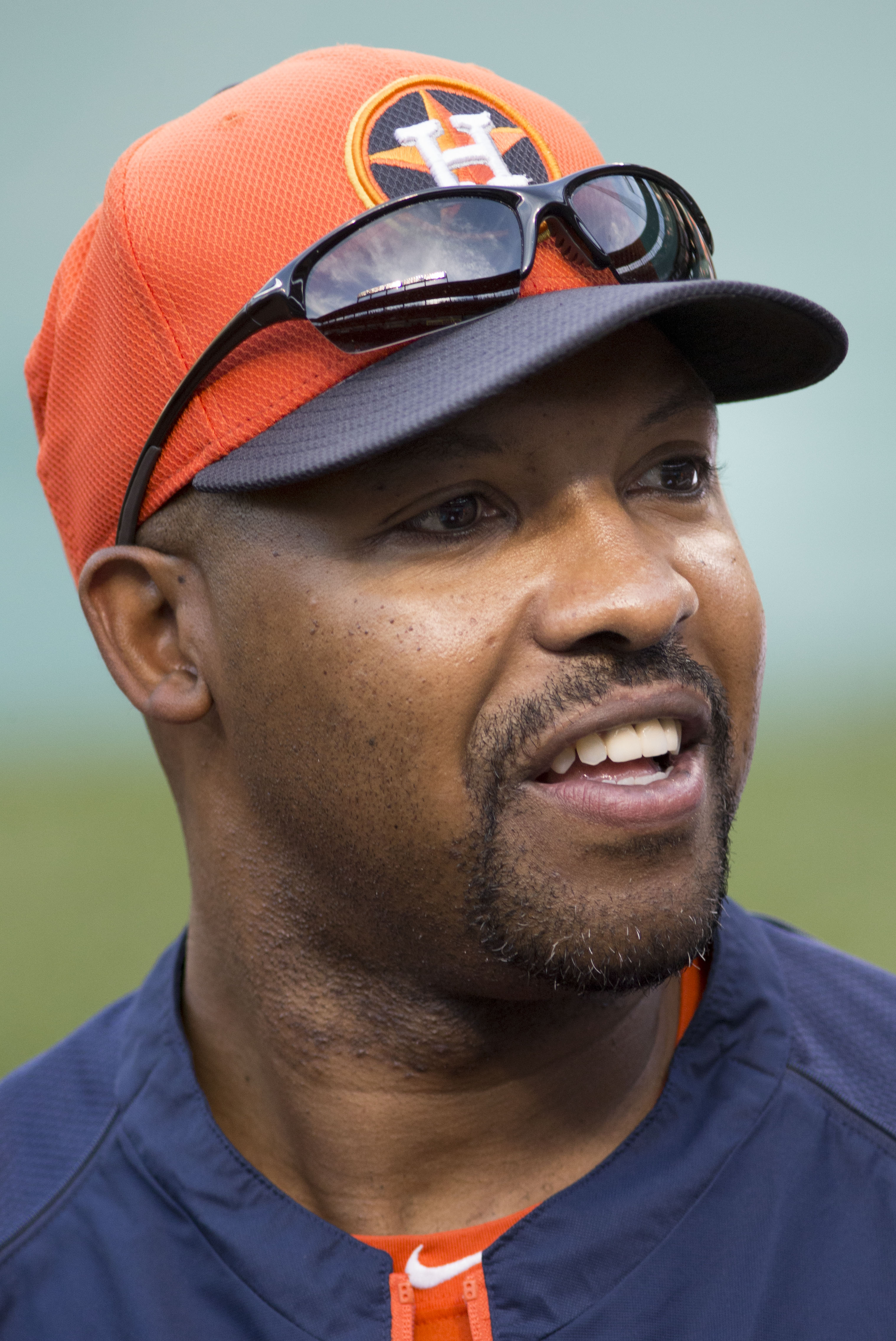
Bo Porter managed the Houston Astros to their win in the 2014 game.

Games	Team	Record (win pct.)	Years (won / lost)
3	Chicago White Sox	2–1 (.667)	2008, **2009**, **2013**
2	Los Angeles Dodgers	2–0 (1.000)	**2012**, **2015**
2	Cincinnati Reds	1–1 (.500)	2009, **2010**
2	St. Louis Cardinals	1–1 (.500)	**2007**, 2010
2	Atlanta Braves	1–1 (.500)	**2011**, 2012
1	New York Mets	1–0 (1.000)	**2008**
1	Houston Astros	1–0 (1.000)	**2014**
1	Cleveland Indians	0–1 (.000)	2007
1	Philadelphia Phillies	0–1 (.000)	2011
1	Texas Rangers	0–1 (.000)	2013
1	Baltimore Orioles	0–1 (.000)	2014
1	Seattle Mariners	0–1 (.000)	2015

== Game summaries ==
Inaugural game

The inaugural game was played on Saturday, March 31, 2007, at 5:30 p.m. and was broadcast nationally on ESPN and ESPNHD. It was announced by ESPN's lead broadcast team of Jon Miller and Joe Morgan, with Peter Gammons serving as a field analyst (his role during Sunday Night Baseball telecasts on ESPN). The game featured the St. Louis Cardinals and Cleveland Indians. Both teams wore uniforms reminiscent of those worn in Negro league games. The Cardinals won, 5–1, receiving a solid five-inning start out of their 2006 closer Adam Wainwright, who got the win.

Selig came under heavy criticism from Native Americans, who felt that the involvement of the Cleveland Indians was a slap in the face to the Cherokee people who still live in the Memphis area after the infamous Trail of Tears passed through less than 200 years ago. The New York Daily News called the situation a "primer on how to inadvertently stage an ironic insult to a local and large population of Natives" and insinuated that the league has (inadvertently) sabotaged the game by inviting the Indians. The sports blog Deadspin asked the question "If the Indians win, do Native Americans get civil rights?"

2008

On December 3, 2007, league officials announced details for the second annual game. It was played on March 29, 2008. The New York Mets beat the Chicago White Sox, 3–2. Martin Luther King III threw out the first pitch. This was the Civil Rights Game with the lowest attendance, primarily because it was held at a minor-league park during cool, rainy weather.

2009

On June 20, 2009, the Civil Rights Game was played for the first time as part of the regular season schedule. The game took place at Great American Ball Park in Cincinnati between the host Cincinnati Reds and the Chicago White Sox. The White Sox defeated the Reds, 10–8. For this game, the teams wore replicas of their 1965 uniforms. The White Sox became the first team to participate in two Civil Rights Games. The game was broadcast on MLB Network except in the home markets of the two teams that played in the game, Cincinnati (FSN Ohio) and Chicago (CSN Chicago).

2010

Cincinnati again hosted the Civil Rights Game on May 15, 2010. The Reds defeated the St. Louis Cardinals in a dramatic 4–3 game that ended when Reds shortstop Orlando Cabrera took a relay throw from left fielder Chris Heisey at the base of the left field wall and threw out Skip Schumaker at home plate trying to score the tying run from first base on Joe Mather's double. Both teams wore replicas of their 1954 uniforms for this game, the first season both teams fielded their first black players. Again, MLB Network telecast the game except in Cincinnati (Fox Sports Ohio) and St. Louis (Fox Sports Midwest).

2011

During the 2010 season, it was announced that Atlanta, Georgia, had been selected to host the 2011 and 2012 Civil Rights Games at Turner Field, home of the Atlanta Braves. Prior to the start of the 2011 season, the 2011 game was announced to be the May 15 series finale between the Atlanta Braves and Philadelphia Phillies. Additionally, the festivities have been expanded from two days to four days. TBS carried the game outside the Philadelphia and Atlanta media markets.

For the Civil Rights Game, the Braves and the Phillies wore their 1974 throwback jerseys to honor Hank Aaron's record-breaking 715th home run in 1974 as a member of the Atlanta Braves. In the previous game of the series, both teams wore Negro league uniforms from their respective cities, the Atlanta Black Crackers for the Braves and the Philadelphia Stars for the Phillies.

The game was a pitching duel against two of the National League's best pitchers, Tim Hudson of the Braves and Roy Halladay of the Phillies. Both pitchers had very good starts, with Hudson going seven and giving up just two runs on a John Mayberry Jr. home run. Halladay worked eight innings, giving up a leadoff eighth-inning home run to Dan Uggla to put the Braves in front. Craig Kimbrel of the Braves closed the game out, earning his 10th save of the season.

2012

The 2012 game was again held at Turner Field in Atlanta. The Braves organization announced on February 21 that the game would be the August 19 series finale versus the Los Angeles Dodgers. The three-game weekend series of August 17–19 was incorporated into the Civil Rights Game Weekend, to honor those on and off the field who have paved the way for equal rights for all Americans.

2013

The 2013 Game was held at US Cellular Field in Chicago on August 24, when the White Sox beat the Texas Rangers by a score of 3–2.

2014

It was announced on November 19, 2013, that the 2014 game would be held at Minute Maid Park in Houston, Texas, on May 30, with the Houston Astros hosting the Baltimore Orioles. Houston beat Baltimore, 2–1. For the game, the Astros played as the Houston Eagles (after the only Negro league team in Texas) and Baltimore played as the Baltimore Elite Giants.

2015

The 2015 game was held on April 15 at Dodger Stadium in Los Angeles which saw the Los Angeles Dodgers host the Seattle Mariners. It was the first Civil Rights Game played on the West Coast. To date, this is the most recent Civil Rights Game played.

== Beacon Awards ==
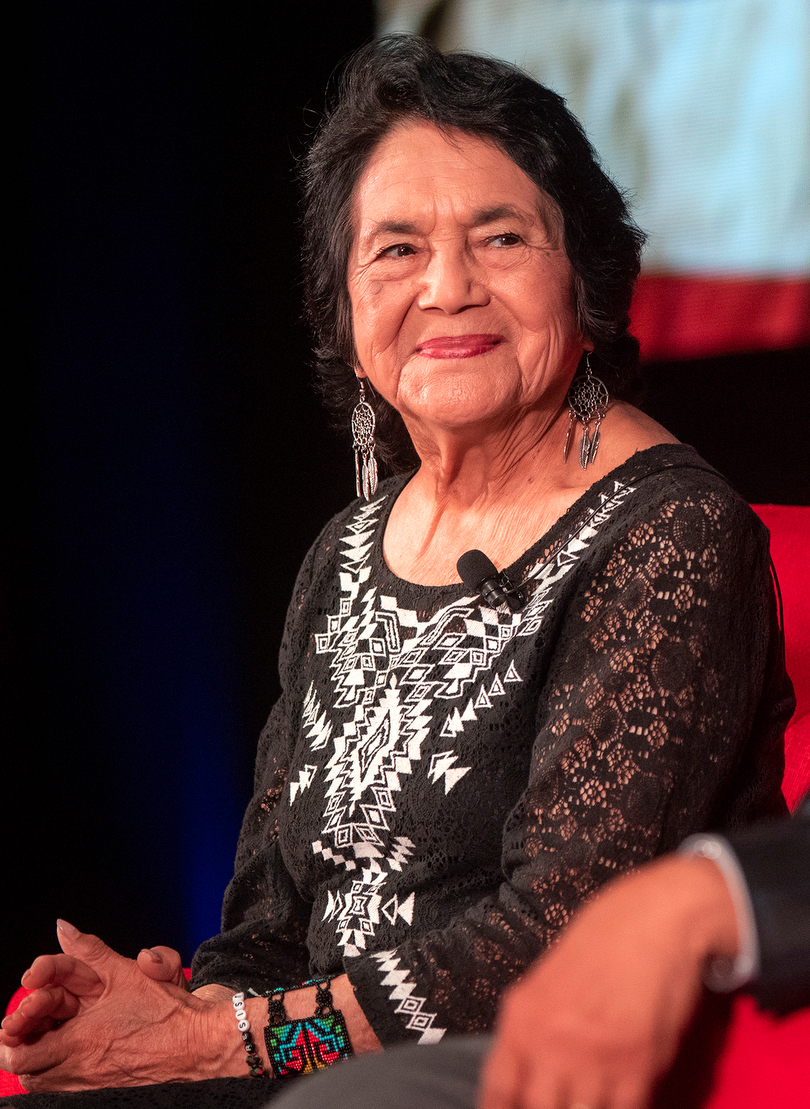
2015 Beacon of Life Award recipient Dolores Huerta

MLB held an annual luncheon prior to the Civil Right Game, at which Beacon Awards were given. The awards given were the Beacon of Life Award, Beacon of Change Award, and Beacon of Hope Award. The following people were recipients of Beacon Awards; keynote speakers at the annual awards luncheon are also listed.

Year	Beacon of Life Award	Beacon of Change Award	Beacon of Hope Award	Awards luncheon keynote speaker	Ref.
2007	Buck O'Neil	Spike Lee	Vera Clemente	Julian Bond	
2008	Frank Robinson	Ruby Dee	John H. Johnson	Joseph Lowery	
2009	Hank Aaron	Muhammad Ali	Bill Cosby	Bill Clinton	
2010	Willie Mays	Billie Jean King	Harry Belafonte	Andrew Young	
2011	Ernie Banks	Carlos Santana	Morgan Freeman	Joseph Lowery	
2012	John Lewis	Earth, Wind & Fire	Don Newcombe	none specified	
2013	Bo Jackson	Aretha Franklin	not awarded	none specified	
2014	Maya Angelou	Berry Gordy	Jim Brown	Robin Roberts	
2015	Dolores Huerta	not awarded	Magic Johnson	none specified	

== See also ==
- East-West Major League Baseball Classic
- Major League Baseball Urban Youth Academy
- Reviving Baseball in Inner Cities
