= Joe DiMaggio =

American baseball player (1914–1999)

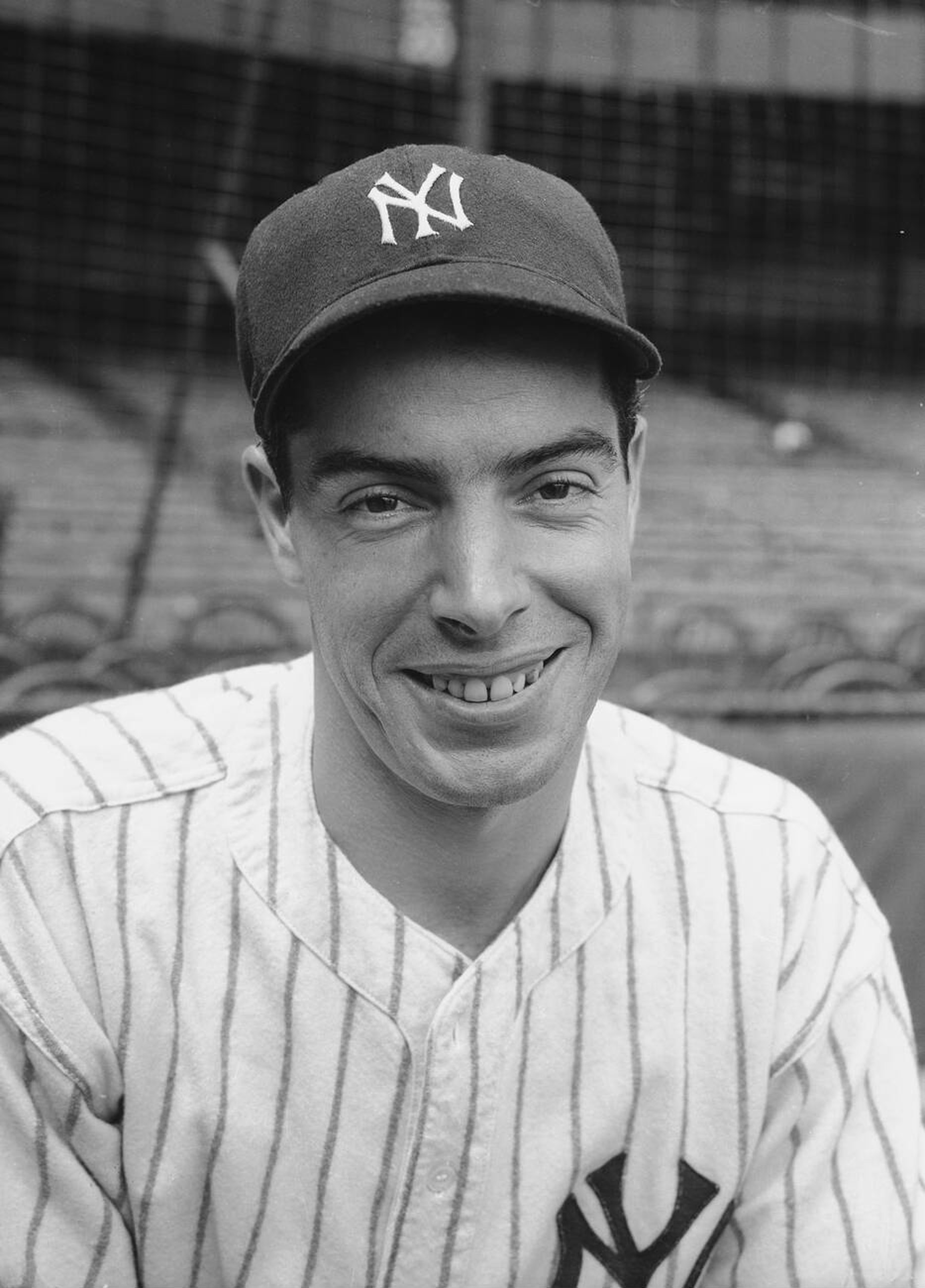
- DiMaggio with the New York Yankees in 1941
- Center fielder
- Born: November 25, 1914; Martinez, California, U.S.
- Died: March 8, 1999 (aged 84); Hollywood, Florida, U.S.
- Batted: Right Threw: Right

MLB debut
- May 3, 1936, for the New York Yankees

Last MLB appearance
- September 30, 1951, for the New York Yankees

MLB statistics
- Batting average: .325
- Hits: 2,214
- Home runs: 361
- Runs batted in: 1,537
- Stats at Baseball Reference

Teams
- As player: New York Yankees (1936–1942, 1946–1951); As coach: Oakland Athletics (1968–1969)

Career highlights and awards
- 13× All-Star (1936–1942, 1946–1951); 9× World Series champion (1936–1939, 1941, 1947, 1949–1951); 3× AL MVP (1939, 1941, 1947); 2× AL batting champion (1939, 1940); 2× AL home run leader (1937, 1948); 2× AL RBI leader (1941, 1948); MLB record 56-game hitting streak; New York Yankees No. 5 retired; Monument Park honoree; Major League Baseball All-Century Team

Member of the National

Baseball Hall of Fame
- Induction: 1955
- Vote: 88.8% (fourth ballot)
Military career
Allegiance	United States
Branch	United States Army Air Forces
Service years	1943–1945
Rank	Staff Sergeant

Joseph Paul DiMaggio (/dəˈmɑːdʒioʊ/; born Giuseppe Paolo DiMaggio, Italian: [dʒuˈzɛppe ˈpaːolo diˈmaddʒo]; November 25, 1914 – March 8, 1999), nicknamed "Joltin' Joe", "the Yankee Clipper" and "Joe D.", was an American professional baseball center fielder who played his entire 13-year career in Major League Baseball (MLB) for the New York Yankees. Born to Italian immigrants in California, he is considered to be one of the greatest baseball players of all time and set the record for the longest hitting streak (56 games from May 15 to July 16, 1941).

DiMaggio was a three-time American League (AL) Most Valuable Player Award winner and an All-Star in each of his 13 seasons. During his tenure with the Yankees, the club won ten American League pennants and nine World Series championships. His nine career World Series rings put him second only to his fellow Yankee Yogi Berra, who won 10.

Upon his retirement in 1951, DiMaggio ranked fifth in career home runs (361) and sixth in career slugging percentage (.579). He was inducted into the Baseball Hall of Fame in 1955 and was voted the sport's greatest living player in a poll taken during baseball's centennial year of 1969. His brothers Vince (1912–1986) and Dom (1917–2009) also were major league center fielders. DiMaggio is also widely known for his marriage and lifelong devotion to Marilyn Monroe.

== Early life ==
Giuseppe Paolo DiMaggio was born on November 25, 1914, in Martinez, California, the eighth of nine children born to Italian immigrants Giuseppe and Rosalia DiMaggio. His Italian birth name was Giuseppe Paolo DiMaggio. Rosalia named her son "Giuseppe" after his father in the hopes he would be her last child.

Giuseppe was a fisherman, as were generations of DiMaggios before him. DiMaggio's brother Tom told Maury Allen that Rosalia's father wrote to her saying Giuseppe could earn a better living in California. Giuseppe and Rosalia decided that he would go to the United States for one year: if things were better, he would send for her; if not, he would return home. After being processed on Ellis Island, Giuseppe worked his way across the country, eventually settling near Rosalia's father in Pittsburg, California on the east side of the San Francisco Bay Area. After four years, he had earned enough money to send for Rosalia and their daughter, who was born after he left. When Joe was a toddler, Giuseppe moved his family to the North Beach section of San Francisco. Giuseppe hoped that his five sons would become fishermen.

DiMaggio recalled that he would do anything to get out of cleaning his father's boat, as the smell of dead fish nauseated him. Giuseppe called him "lazy" and "good-for-nothing". At age ten, he took up baseball, playing third base at the North Beach playground near his home. DiMaggio began with the neighborhood team. Within months, a rival team tempted him away for two dollars. Before long, he was bouncing between teams as a hired bat. After attending Hancock Elementary and Francisco Middle School, DiMaggio dropped out of Galileo High School and worked odd jobs.

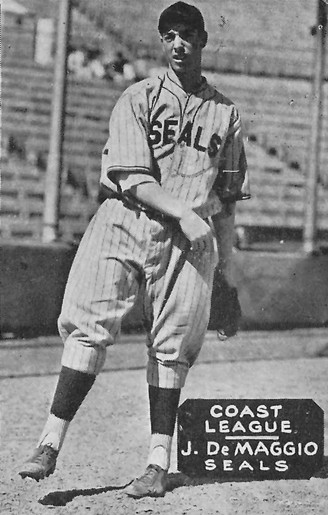
A baseball card of DiMaggio with the San Francisco Seals, c. 1934

By 1931, DiMaggio was playing semi-pro ball. Nearing the end of the 1932 season, his brother Vince, playing for the San Francisco Seals of the Pacific Coast League (PCL), talked his manager into letting DiMaggio fill in at shortstop. He made his professional debut on October 1, 1932, playing the last three games. In less than two years, DiMaggio made the jump from the playground to the PCL, one notch below the majors. In his full rookie year, from May 27 to July 25, 1933, he hit safely in 61 consecutive games, a PCL-record, and second-longest in Minor League Baseball history. "Baseball didn't really get into my blood until I knocked off that hitting streak," he said. "Getting a daily hit became more important to me than eating, drinking, or sleeping."

In 1934, DiMaggio suffered a potentially career-threatening knee injury when he tore ligaments of his right knee while stepping out of a jitney. Convinced the injury would heal, Yankees scout Bill Essick pestered his bosses to give DiMaggio another look. After he passed a physical, the team bought him for $50,000 (equivalent to $1,200,000 in 2025) and five players, with the Seals keeping him for the 1935 season. DiMaggio batted .398 with 154 runs batted in (RBIs) and 34 home runs. The Seals won the 1935 PCL title, and he was named the league's Most Valuable Player.

== Professional career ==
=== New York Yankees (1936–1942, 1946–1951) ===
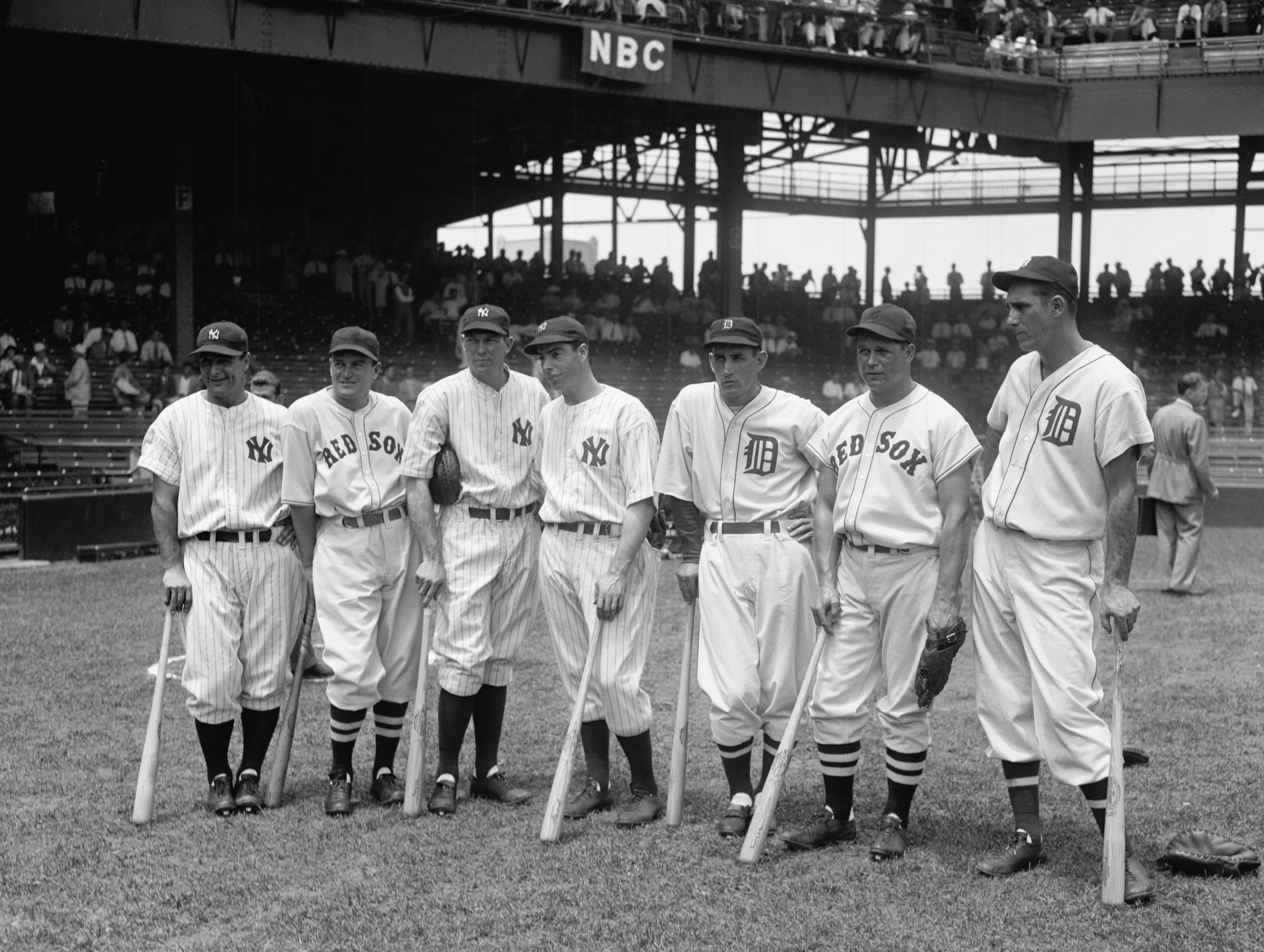
Seven of the American League's 1937 All-Star players: Lou Gehrig, Joe Cronin, Bill Dickey, Joe DiMaggio, Charlie Gehringer, Jimmie Foxx, and Hank Greenberg. All seven were eventually elected to the Hall of Fame.

DiMaggio made his Major League debut on May 3, 1936, batting ahead of Lou Gehrig in the lineup. The Yankees had not been to the World Series since 1932, but they won the next four World Series. Over the course of his 13-year Major League career, DiMaggio led the Yankees to nine World Series championships, where he trails only Yogi Berra (10) in that category.

DiMaggio set a franchise record for rookies in 1936 by hitting 29 home runs. DiMaggio accomplished the feat in 138 games. His record stood for over 80 years until it was bested by Aaron Judge, who tallied 52 homers in 2017.

In 1937, DiMaggio built upon his rookie season by leading the majors with 46 home runs, 151 runs scored, 167 runs batted in and 418 total bases, all career highs. He also hit safely in 43 of 44 games from June 27 to August 12. He finished second in American League MVP voting in a close race with Charlie Gehringer of the Detroit Tigers.

In 1939, DiMaggio was nicknamed "the Yankee Clipper" by Yankee's play-by-play announcer Arch McDonald, when he likened DiMaggio's speed and range in the outfield to the then-new Pan American airliner. That year in August, DiMaggio recorded 53 RBIs, tying Hack Wilson's 1930 record for most in a single month. He also won his first career batting title and MVP award, as well as leading the Yankees to their fourth consecutive World Series championship.

DiMaggio was pictured with his son on the cover of the inaugural issue of SPORT magazine in September 1946.

In 1947, DiMaggio won his third MVP award and his sixth World Series with the Yankees. That year, Boston Red Sox owner Tom Yawkey and Yankees GM Larry MacPhail verbally agreed to trade DiMaggio for Ted Williams, but the trade was canceled when MacPhail refused to include Yogi Berra.

In the September 1949 issue of SPORT, Hank Greenberg said that DiMaggio covered so much ground in center field that the only way to get a hit against the Yankees was "to hit 'em where Joe wasn't." DiMaggio also stole home five times in his career. According to the David Halberstam book Summer of '49, former manager Joe McCarthy said, "DiMaggio might have stolen 60 bases a season if I had given him the green light."

On February 7, 1949, DiMaggio signed a contract worth $100,000 (equivalent to $1,400,000 in 2025) ($70,000 plus bonuses), and became the first baseball player to break $100,000 in earnings. By 1950, he was ranked the second-best center fielder by the Sporting News, after Larry Doby. After a poor 1951 season, various injuries, and a scouting report by the Brooklyn Dodgers that was turned over to the New York Giants and leaked to the press, DiMaggio announced his retirement at age 37 on December 11, 1951. When remarking on his retirement to the Sporting News on December 19, 1951, he said:

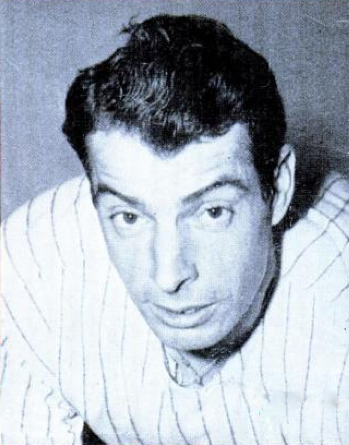
DiMaggio in 1951, his last year in baseball

I feel like I have reached the stage where I can no longer produce for my club, my manager, and my teammates. I had a poor year, but even if I had hit .350, this would have been my last year. I was full of aches and pains and it had become a chore for me to play. When baseball is no longer fun, it's no longer a game, and so, I've played my last game.

Through May 2009, DiMaggio was tied with Mark McGwire for third place all-time in home runs over the first two calendar years in the major leagues (77), behind Phillies Hall of Famer Chuck Klein (83) and Milwaukee Brewers' Ryan Braun (79). Through 2011, he was one of seven major leaguers to have had at least four 30-homer, 100-RBI seasons in their first five years, along with Klein, Ted Williams, Ralph Kiner, Mark Teixeira, Albert Pujols, and Braun. DiMaggio holds the record for most seasons with more home runs than strikeouts (minimum 20 home runs), a feat he accomplished seven times, and five times consecutively from 1937 to 1941. DiMaggio could have possibly exceeded 500 home runs and 2,000 RBIs had he not served in the military during World War II, causing him to miss the 1943, 1944, and 1945 seasons.

DiMaggio might have had better power-hitting statistics had his home park not been Yankee Stadium. In "The House That Ruth Built", its nearby right field favored the Babe's left-handed power. For right-handed hitters, its deep left and center fields made home runs almost impossible. Mickey Mantle recalled that he and Whitey Ford witnessed many DiMaggio blasts that would have been home runs anywhere other than Yankee Stadium (Ruth himself fell victim to that problem, as he also hit many long flyouts to center). Bill James calculated that DiMaggio lost more home runs due to his home park than any other player in history. Left-center field went as far back as 457 ft [139 m], whereas left-center rarely reaches 380 ft [116 m] in today's ballparks. Al Gionfriddo's famous catch in the 1947 World Series, which was close to the 415-foot mark [126 m] in left-center, just in front of the visitors bullpen, would have been a home run in the Yankees' current ballpark and most other ballparks at that time, except perhaps the Polo Grounds, home of the New York Giants. DiMaggio hit 148 home runs in 3,360 at-bats at home versus 213 home runs in 3,461 at-bats on the road. His slugging percentage at home was .546, and on the road, it was .610. Statistician Bill Jenkinson commented on these figures:

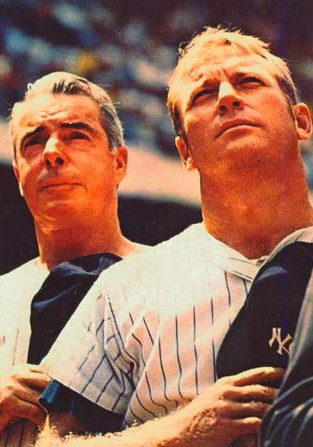
DiMaggio and Mickey Mantle at Yankee Stadium in 1970, two years after Mantle's retirement

For example, Joe DiMaggio was acutely handicapped by playing at Yankee Stadium. Every time he batted in his home field during his entire career, he did so knowing that it was physically impossible for him to hit a home run to the half of the field directly in front of him. If you look at a baseball field from foul line to foul line, it has a 90-degree radius. From the power alley in the left-center field (430 in Joe's time) to the fence in the deep right-center field (407 ft), it is 45 degrees. And Joe DiMaggio never hit a single home run over the fences at Yankee Stadium in that 45-degree graveyard. It was just too far. Joe was plenty strong; he routinely hit balls in the 425-foot range. But that just wasn't good enough in the cavernous Yankee Stadium. Like Ruth, he benefited from a few easy homers each season due to the short foul line distances. But he lost many more than he gained by constantly hitting long flyouts toward center field. Whereas most sluggers perform better on their home fields, DiMaggio hit only 41 percent of his career home runs in the Bronx. He hit 148 homers at Yankee Stadium. If he had hit the same exact pattern of batted balls with a typical modern stadium as his home, he would have belted about 225 homers during his home-field career.

DiMaggio became eligible for the Baseball Hall of Fame in 1953 but he was not elected until 1955. The Hall of Fame rules on the post-retirement induction waiting period had been revised in the interim, extending the waiting period from one to five years, but DiMaggio and Ted Lyons were exempted from the rule. DiMaggio told Baseball Digest in 1963 that the Brooklyn Dodgers had offered him their managerial job in 1953, but he turned it down. After being out of baseball since his retirement as an active player, DiMaggio joined the newly relocated Oakland Athletics as a vice president in 1968 and 1969 and a coach in just the first of those two seasons. The appointment allowed him to qualify for MLB's maximum pension allowance of which he had fallen two years short upon his retirement. During his only campaign as a coach, he helped improve the talents of players such as Reggie Jackson, Sal Bando, and Joe Rudi who became part of the team's nucleus which won three consecutive World Series in 1972, 1973, and 1974.

After he resigned from the Athletics, DiMaggio was named the acting manager for the East team in the East-West Major League Baseball Classic which was held in honor of the late Martin Luther King Jr., raising charity money for King's causes.

=== 1941 hitting streak ===
DiMaggio's streak is the most extraordinary thing that ever happened in American sports.

— Stephen Jay Gould

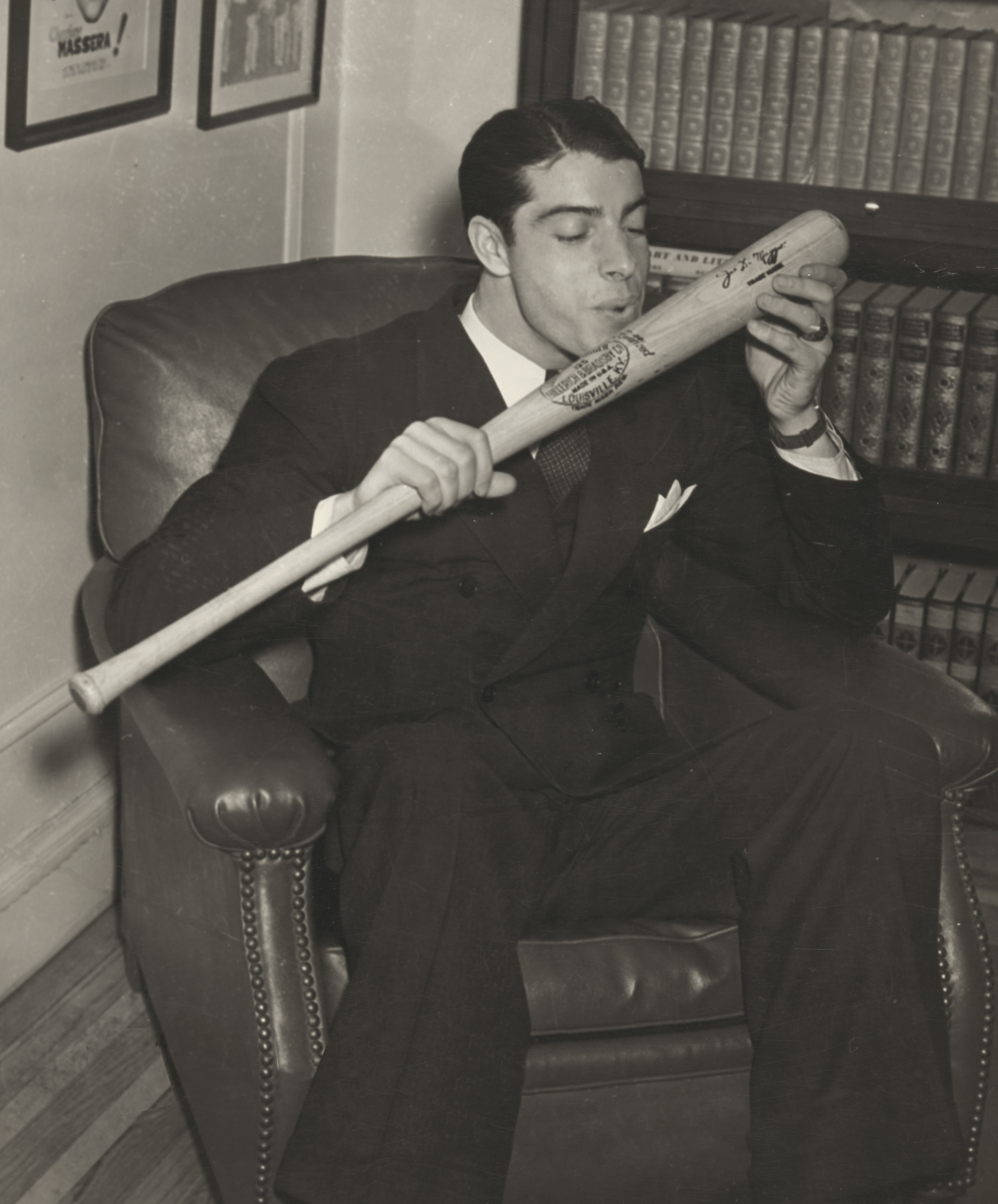
DiMaggio kisses his bat in 1941, the year he hit safely in 56 consecutive games. His wife Dorothy Arnold was pregnant with their son Joe Jr. while the streak was in progress.

DiMaggio's most famous achievement is his MLB record-breaking 56-game hitting streak in 1941. The streak began on May 15, a couple of weeks before the death of Lou Gehrig—who had been DiMaggio's teammate from 1936 to 1939—when DiMaggio went one-for-four against Chicago White Sox pitcher Eddie Smith. Major newspapers began to write about DiMaggio's streak early on, but as he approached George Sisler's modern-era record of 41 games, it became a national phenomenon. Initially, DiMaggio showed little interest in breaking Sisler's record, saying: "I'm not thinking a whole lot about it... I'll either break it or I won't." As he approached Sisler's record, DiMaggio showed more interest, saying, "At the start, I didn't think much about it... but naturally I'd like to get the record since I am this close." On June 29, 1941, DiMaggio doubled in the first game of a doubleheader against the Washington Senators at Griffith Stadium to tie Sisler's record and then singled in the nightcap to extend his streak to 42.

A Yankee Stadium crowd of 52,832 fans watched DiMaggio tie the all-time hitting streak record (44 games, Wee Willie Keeler in 1897) on July 1. The next day against the Boston Red Sox, he homered into Yankee Stadium's left-field stands to extend his streak to 45, setting a new record. DiMaggio recorded 67 hits in 179 at-bats during the first 45 games of his streak, while Keeler recorded 88 hits in 201 at-bats. DiMaggio continued hitting after breaking Keeler's record, reaching 50 straight games on July 11 against the St. Louis Browns. On July 17 at Cleveland's Municipal Stadium, DiMaggio's streak was finally snapped at 56 games, thanks in part to two backhand stops by Indians third baseman Ken Keltner. DiMaggio batted .408 during the streak with 15 home runs and 55 RBI. The day after the streak ended DiMaggio started another streak that lasted 16 games, therefore hitting safely in 72 of 73 games. The closest anyone has come to equaling DiMaggio is Pete Rose, who hit safely in 44 straight games in 1978. During the streak, DiMaggio played in seven doubleheaders. The Yankees' record during the streak was 41–13–2. Some consider DiMaggio's streak a uniquely outstanding and unbreakable record and a statistical near-impossibility. Nobel Prize-winning physicist and sabermetrician Edward Mills Purcell calculated that, to have the likelihood of a hitting streak of 50 games occurring in the history of baseball up to the late 1980s be greater than 50%, 52 .350 lifetime hitters would have to have existed instead of the actual three (Ty Cobb, Rogers Hornsby, and Shoeless Joe Jackson). His Harvard colleague Stephen Jay Gould, citing Purcell's work, called DiMaggio's 56-game achievement "the most extraordinary thing that ever happened in American sports". Samuel Arbesman and Steven Strogatz of Cornell University disagree. They conducted 10,000 computer simulations of Major League Baseball from 1871 to 2005, 42% of which produced streaks as long or longer, with record streaks ranging from 39 to 109 games and typical record streaks between 50 and 64 games.

== World War II ==
DiMaggio enlisted in the United States Army Air Forces on February 17, 1943, rising to the rank of Staff Sergeant. He was stationed at Santa Ana, California, Hawaii, and Atlantic City, New Jersey, as a physical education instructor. He was released on a medical discharge in September 1945, due to chronic stomach ulcers. Other than being paid $21 a month, DiMaggio's service was as comfortable as a soldier's life could be. He spent most of his military career playing for baseball teams and in exhibition games against fellow Major Leaguers and minor league players, and superiors gave him special privileges due to his prewar fame. DiMaggio ate so well from an athlete-only diet that he gained 10 pounds, and while in Hawaii he and other players mostly tanned on the beach and drank. Embarrassed by his lifestyle, DiMaggio requested that he be given a combat assignment but was turned down.

=== Parents as "enemy aliens" ===
Giuseppe and Rosalia DiMaggio, both from Isola delle Femmine, were among the thousands of German, Japanese, and Italian immigrants classified as "enemy aliens" by the government after the attack on Pearl Harbor. Each was required to carry photo ID booklets at all times and was not allowed to travel outside a five-mile radius from their home without a permit. Giuseppe was barred from San Francisco Bay, where he had fished for decades, and his boat was seized. Rosalia became an American citizen in 1945, followed by Giuseppe in 1946.

== Marriages ==
=== Dorothy Arnold ===
In January 1937, DiMaggio met actress Dorothy Arnold on the set of Manhattan Merry-Go-Round, in which he had a minor role, and she was an extra. He announced their engagement on April 25, 1939, just before the Yankees were to meet the Philadelphia Athletics. They married at Saints Peter and Paul Church, San Francisco on November 19, 1939, as 20,000 well-wishers jammed the streets. The couple's son, Joseph Paul DiMaggio Jr. (1941–1999), was born at Doctors' Hospital in Staten Island. Their marriage was troubled, as Arnold wanted DiMaggio to settle down and be a father to their son and a nearby husband to her; DiMaggio was more interested in the public eye. The couple divorced in 1944, while DiMaggio was on leave from the Yankees during World War II.

=== Marilyn Monroe ===
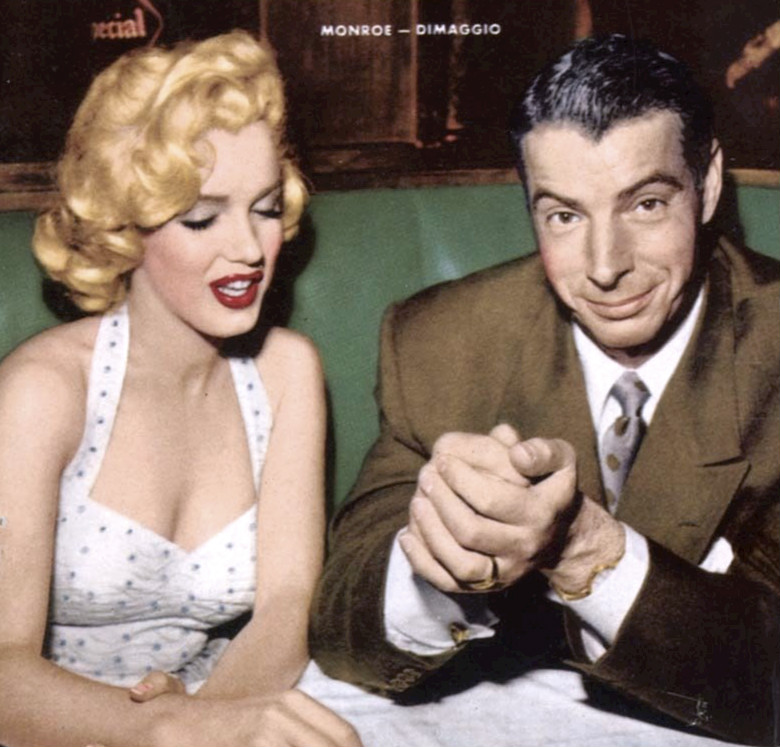
DiMaggio with wife Marilyn Monroe, January 1954

According to her autobiography My Story, co-written with Ben Hecht, American actress Marilyn Monroe originally did not want to meet DiMaggio, fearing he was a stereotypical arrogant athlete. However, they did meet in Los Angeles while on a blind date. After dating for two years, they eloped at San Francisco City Hall on January 14, 1954. Although she suffered from endometriosis, Monroe and DiMaggio each expressed to reporters their desire to start a family.

The union was troubled from the start by DiMaggio's jealousy, controlling attitude, and him physically abusing Monroe, as well as by her busy life as an actress. A violent fight entailing physical assault between the couple occurred immediately after Monroe filmed the skirt-blowing scene in The Seven Year Itch that was filmed on September 14, 1954, in front of Manhattan's Trans-Lux 52nd Street Theater, as DiMaggio disapproved of the scene. Then 20th Century Fox's East Coast correspondent Bill Kobrin told the Palm Springs Desert Sun that it was director Billy Wilder's idea to turn the shoot into a media circus. Monroe and DiMaggio then had a "yelling battle" in the theater lobby. After returning from New York City to Hollywood in October 1954, Monroe filed for divorce from DiMaggio after only nine months of marriage. However, she was devastated to leave DiMaggio, and throughout the procedures in court, she could be seen weeping openly.

DiMaggio was also devastated, and wrote to Monroe, saying, "I love you and want to be with you…There is nothing I would like better than to restore your confidence in me…My heart split even wider seeing you cry in front of all those people." He also wrote, "[I don't] know what your thoughts are about me, but I can tell you I love you sincerely—way deep in my heart, regardless of anything." After the divorce, DiMaggio underwent therapy, stopped drinking alcohol, and expanded his interests beyond baseball.

On August 1, 1956, an International News wire photo of DiMaggio with Lee Meriwether gave rise to speculation that they were engaged, but DiMaggio biographer Richard Ben Cramer wrote that it was a rumor started by columnist Walter Winchell. Monroe biographer Donald Spoto claimed that DiMaggio was "very close to marrying" 1957 Miss America Marian McKnight, who won the crown with a Marilyn Monroe act, but McKnight denied it. He was also linked to Liz Renay, Cleo Moore, Rita Gam, Marlene Dietrich, and Gloria DeHaven during this period, and years later to Elizabeth Ray and Morgan Fairchild, but he never publicly confirmed any involvement with any woman.

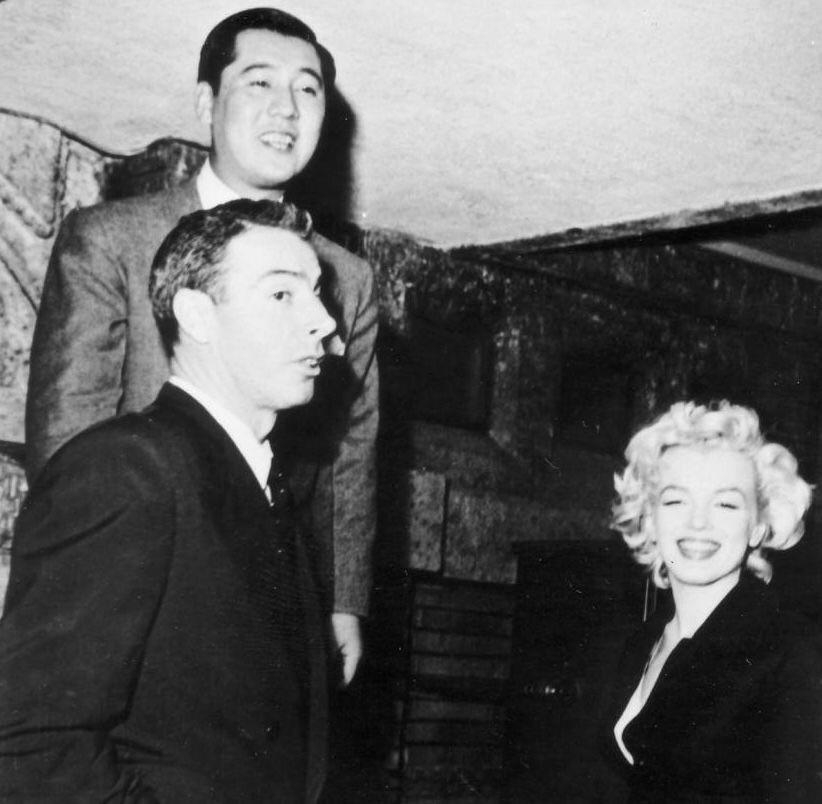
DiMaggio and Marilyn Monroe staying at Imperial Hotel in Tokyo on their honeymoon

DiMaggio re-entered Monroe's life as her marriage to Arthur Miller was ending. On February 10, 1961, he secured her release from Payne Whitney Psychiatric Clinic in Manhattan. She joined him in Florida where he was a batting coach for the Yankees. Their "just friends" claim did not stop remarriage rumors from flying. Reporters staked out her Manhattan apartment building. Bob Hope "dedicated" Best Song nominee "The Second Time Around" to them at the 33rd Academy Awards. In one of her last interviews, given to Redbook magazine and published in August 1962, Monroe explained : "I've always been able to count on Joe as a friend after that first bitterness of our parting faded. Believe me, there is no spark to be kindled. I just like being with him and we have a better understanding than we've ever had."

On August 5, 1962, Monroe was found dead in her Brentwood, Los Angeles home after her housekeeper Eunice R. Murray telephoned Monroe's psychiatrist, Ralph Greenson. DiMaggio's son had spoken to Monroe on the phone the night of her death and said she seemed fine. Her death was deemed a probable suicide by "Coroner to the Stars" Thomas Noguchi. It has also been the subject of conspiracy theories.

The funeral service was arranged by DiMaggio, Monroe's half-sister Berniece Baker Miracle, and Monroe's business manager Inez Melson. DiMaggio had a half-dozen red roses delivered to her crypt three times a week for 20 years. Oftentimes, he refused to talk about her publicly or otherwise exploit their relationship, and in the rare moments when he did speak to reporters, he was unable to hold back tears. He never married again.

According to DiMaggio's attorney Morris Engelberg, DiMaggio's last words were "I'll finally get to see Marilyn." Though DiMaggio's brother Dominic challenged Engelberg's version of Joe's final moments and his motives, Engelberg continuously denied those who questioned DiMaggio's last words, reporting that one night when he and a terminally ill DiMaggio were sitting together, DiMaggio told him, "I don't feel bad about dying. At least I'll be with Marilyn again."

== Advertising ==
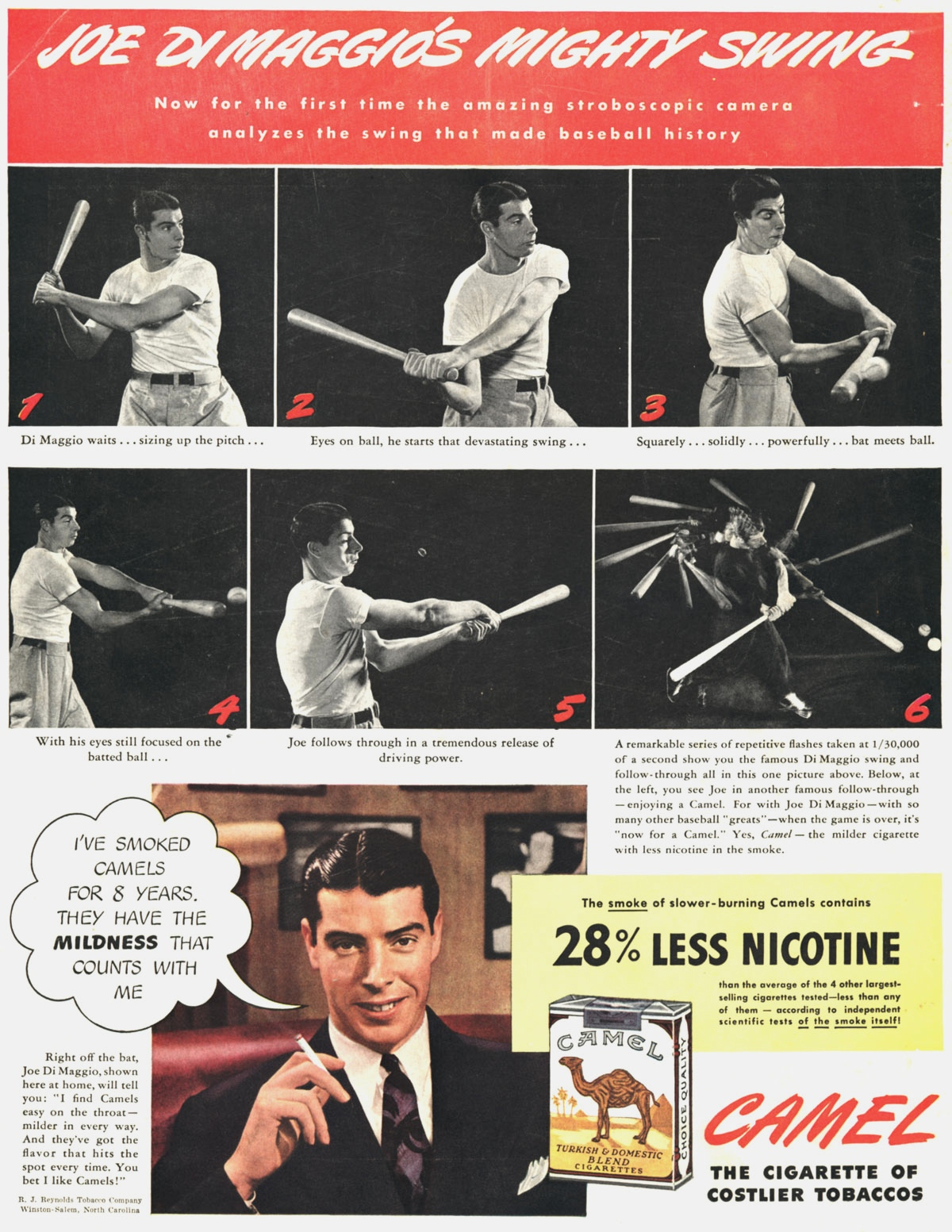
1941 advertisement for Camel cigarettes featuring DiMaggio

In the 1970s, DiMaggio became a spokesman for Mr. Coffee, and was the face of the electric drip coffee makers for over 20 years. Vincent Marotta, the CEO of North American Systems, which manufactured Mr. Coffee at the time, recruited DiMaggio for the advertising campaign. DiMaggio's spots were successful with consumers. In a 2007 interview with The Columbus Dispatch, Marotta joked that "millions of kids grew up thinking Joe DiMaggio was a famous appliance salesman." Despite the commercials, DiMaggio rarely drank coffee due to ulcers, and when he did drink coffee, he preferred Sanka instant coffee rather than coffee brewed by Mr. Coffee machines.

In 1972, DiMaggio became a spokesman for the Bowery Savings Bank. Except for a five-year hiatus in the 1980s, he regularly made commercials for them until 1992. In 1986, he became a spokesperson for Florida's Cross Keys Village, an active retirement community.

== Television programs ==
Beginning in April 1952, DiMaggio had 10-minute programs on Channel 11 in New York City before and after each Yankees' home game. Episodes included interviews with guests and DiMaggio's comments about baseball. The team owned the program, with DiMaggio under contract to the Yankees. He also did Joe DiMaggio's Dugout on Channel 4 in New York City, a weekly filmed program unrelated to the pre-and post-game shows. It featured instructional sessions and quizzes for young people.

== Death ==
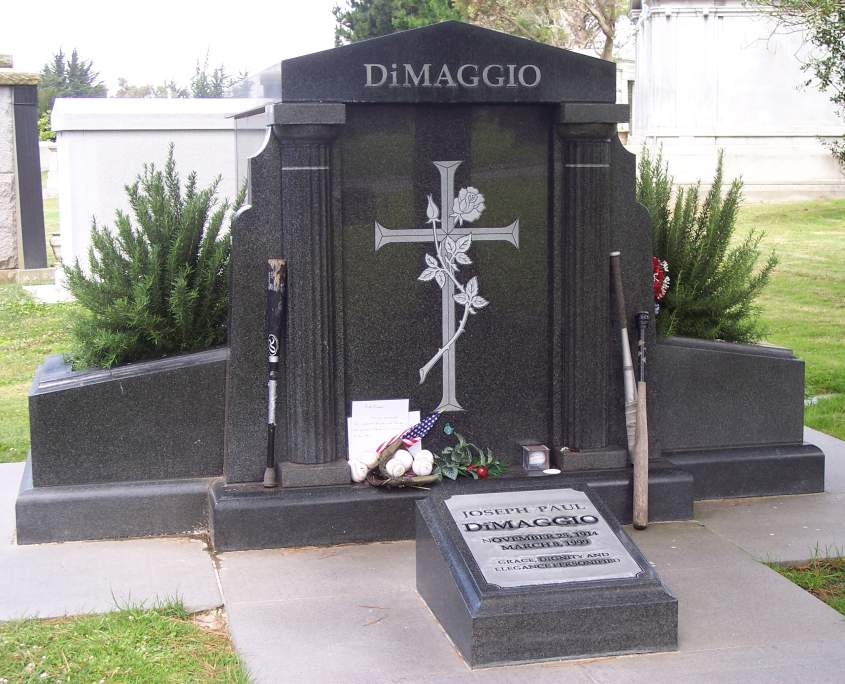
DiMaggio's grave at Holy Cross Cemetery in Colma, California

DiMaggio was a heavy smoker for much of his adult life. He was admitted to Memorial Regional Hospital in Hollywood, Florida, on October 12, 1998, for lung cancer surgery and remained there for 99 days. He returned to his home in Hollywood, Florida, on January 19, 1999, where he died on March 8 at age 84. DiMaggio's attorney, Morris Engelberg, reported that his last words were, "I'll finally get to see Marilyn", referring to his ex-wife Marilyn Monroe.

DiMaggio's funeral was held on March 11, 1999, at Saints Peter and Paul Church in San Francisco, and he was interred three months later at Holy Cross Cemetery in Colma, California. His son also died that year, on August 6, at age 57.

== Legacy ==
At his death, The New York Times called DiMaggio's 1941 56-game hitting streak "perhaps the most enduring record in sports."

According to American geneticist Mary-Claire King, in the spring of 1981 DiMaggio babysat her daughter at the San Francisco airport so King could drop her mother off to her flight to Chicago. According to King, if it were not for DiMaggio's kindness, she would have almost certainly missed her own flight that was taking her and her daughter to Washington, D.C., a trip that eventually resulted in King's getting her first major grant from the National Institutes of Health and the discovery of the breast and ovarian cancer-causing gene BRCA1.

On September 17, 1992, the doors were opened at Joe DiMaggio Children's Hospital at Memorial Regional Hospital in Hollywood, Florida, for which he raised over $4 million.

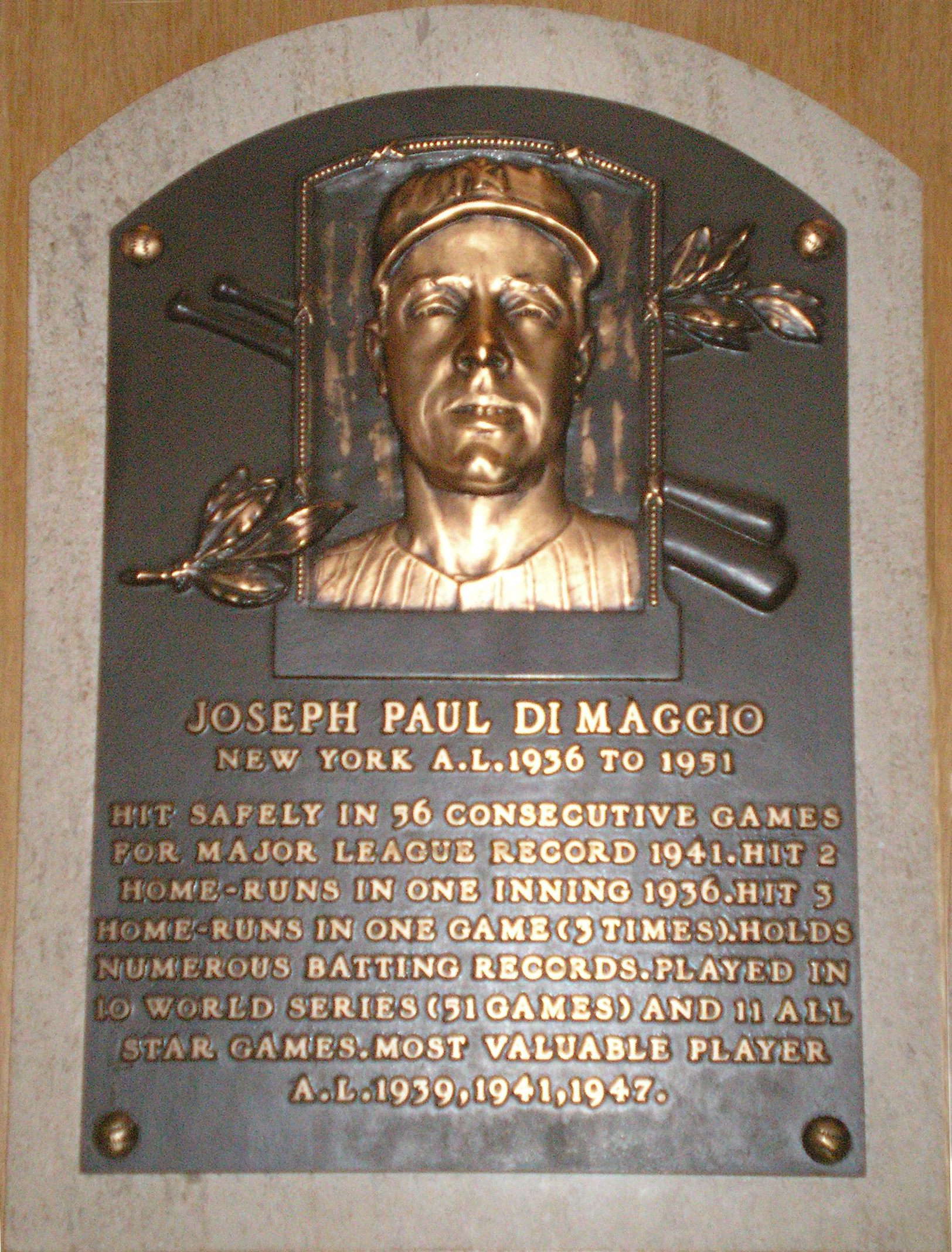
DiMaggio's plaque at the National Baseball Hall of Fame and Museum

On April 13, 1998, DiMaggio was given the Sports Legend Award at the 13th annual American Sportscasters Association Hall of Fame Awards Dinner in New York City. Henry Kissinger, former Secretary of State and a longtime fan of DiMaggio, made the presentation to the Yankee great. The event was one of DiMaggio's last public appearances before taking ill.

Yankee Stadium's fifth monument was dedicated to DiMaggio on April 25, 1999, and the West Side Highway was officially renamed The Joe DiMaggio Highway in his honor. The Yankees wore DiMaggio's number 5 on the left sleeves of their uniforms for the 1999 season. He is ranked No. 11 on The Sporting News' list of the 100 Greatest Baseball Players, and he was elected by fans to the Major League Baseball All-Century Teamaddition to his number 5 being retired by the New York Yankees, DiMaggio's number was also retired by the Florida Marlins, who retired it in honor of their first team president, Carl Barger, who died five months before the team took the field for the first time in 1993. DiMaggio had been his favorite player.

In 2000 after some negotiations, the heirs of Joe DiMaggio's estate, two granddaughters and their four children, welcomed the renaming of San Francisco's North Beach playground, the place where Joe DiMaggio first took up baseball as a boy, as the Joe DiMaggio North Beach Playground.

In 2001, Major League Baseball introduced an online daily fantasy game called "Beat the Streak" which required players to pick one or two MLB players to get a hit in a game that day. The goal was to pick correctly 57 times in a row to beat DiMaggio's record streak. The prize money for beating the streak is $5.6 million. Through August 2021, more than 4.5 million players had combined to make over 100 million attempts but none had reached even 52 consecutive hits in the game's history.

In May 2006, the adopted daughters of DiMaggio's son held an auction of DiMaggio's personal items. Highlights included the ball he hit in breaking Wee Willie Keeler's hitting-streak record ($63,250); his 2,000th career hit ball ($29,900); his 1947 Most Valuable Player Award ($281,750); the uniform worn in the 1951 World Series ($195,500); his Hall of Fame ring ($69,000); a photograph Marilyn autographed "I love you Joe" ($80,500); her passport ($115,000); and their marriage certificate ($23,000). Lot 758, DiMaggio's white 1991 Mercedes 420 SEL sedan, which was a gift from the New York Yankees commemorating the 50th anniversary of DiMaggio's 1941 season, sold for $18,000. The event netted a total of $4.1 million (equivalent to $6,500,000 in 2025).

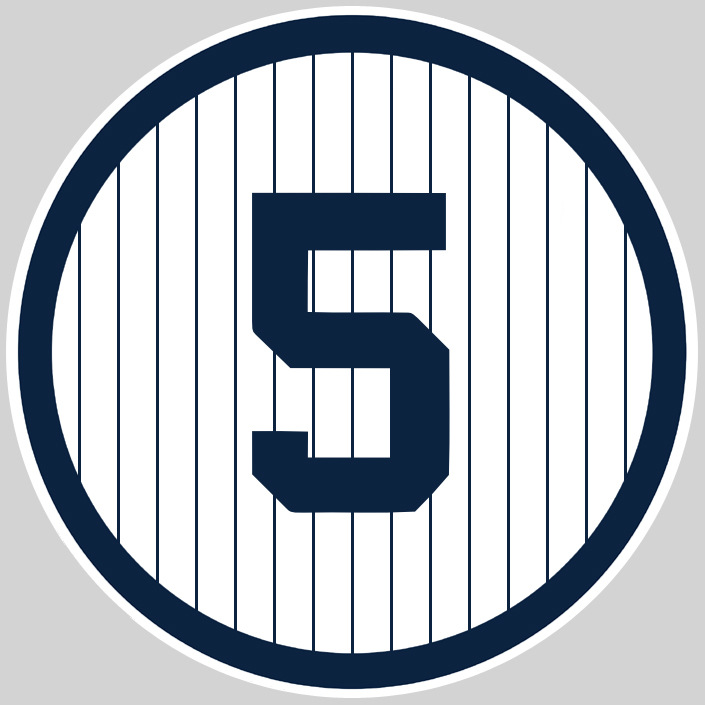
Joe DiMaggio's number 5 was retired by the New York Yankees in 1952.

On August 8, 2011, the United States Postal Service announced that an image of DiMaggio would appear on a stamp for the first time. It was issued as part of the "Major League Baseball All-Star Stamp Series," which came out in July 2012.

DiMaggio insisted on being introduced as the "Greatest Living Ballplayer" at events, including Yankee Old-Timers Day, and he once punched Billy Crystal in the stomach for not introducing him as such.

In 2013, the Bob Feller Act of Valor Award honored DiMaggio as one of 37 Baseball Hall of Fame members for his service in the United States Army Air Force during World War II.

The Joe DiMaggio Fields in his hometown of Martinez, California, are named after him.

There is a Joe DiMaggio Street in San Antonio, Texas.

== Career statistics ==
Category	G	AB	R	H	2B	3B	HR	RBI	TB	BB	SO	AVG	OBP	SLG	OPS	FLD%	Ref.
Total	1,736	6,821	1,390	2,214	389	131	361	1,537	3,948	790	369	.325	.398	.579	.977	.978	

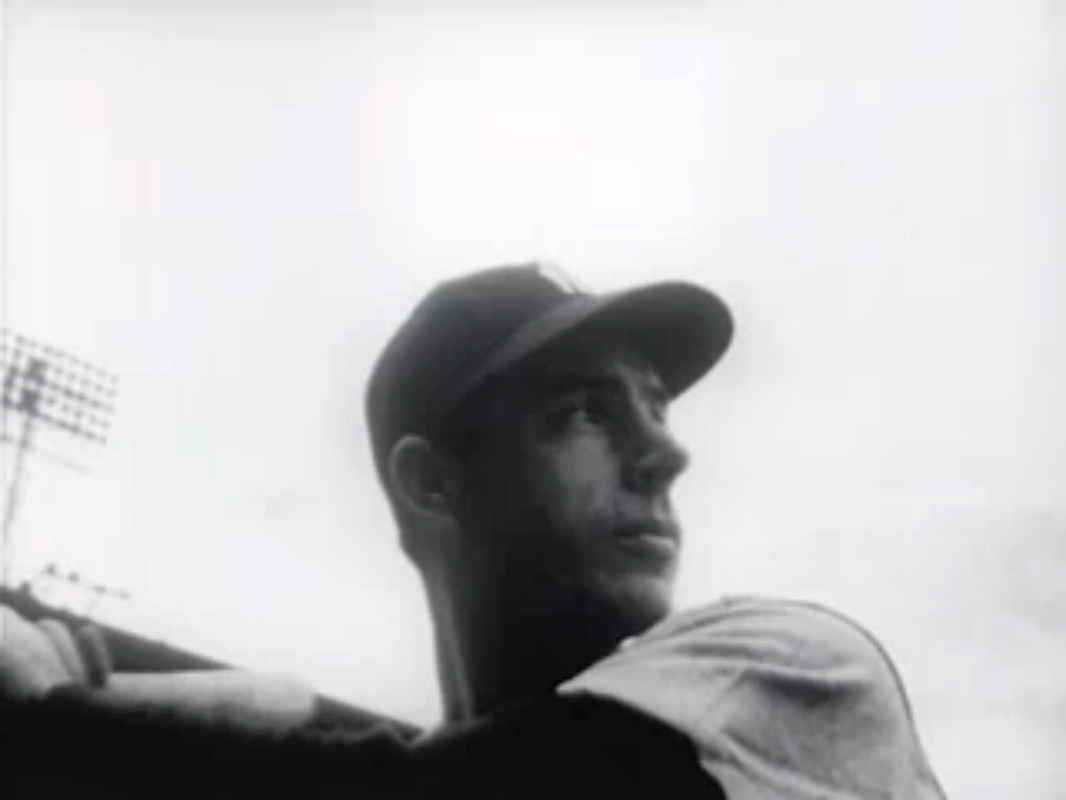
DiMaggio in 1950

DiMaggio played in 10 World Series, winning 9. His only loss was in the 1942 World Series. He batted .271 (54–199), with 27 runs scored, 8 home runs, and 30 RBI in 51 post-season games.

== In popular culture ==
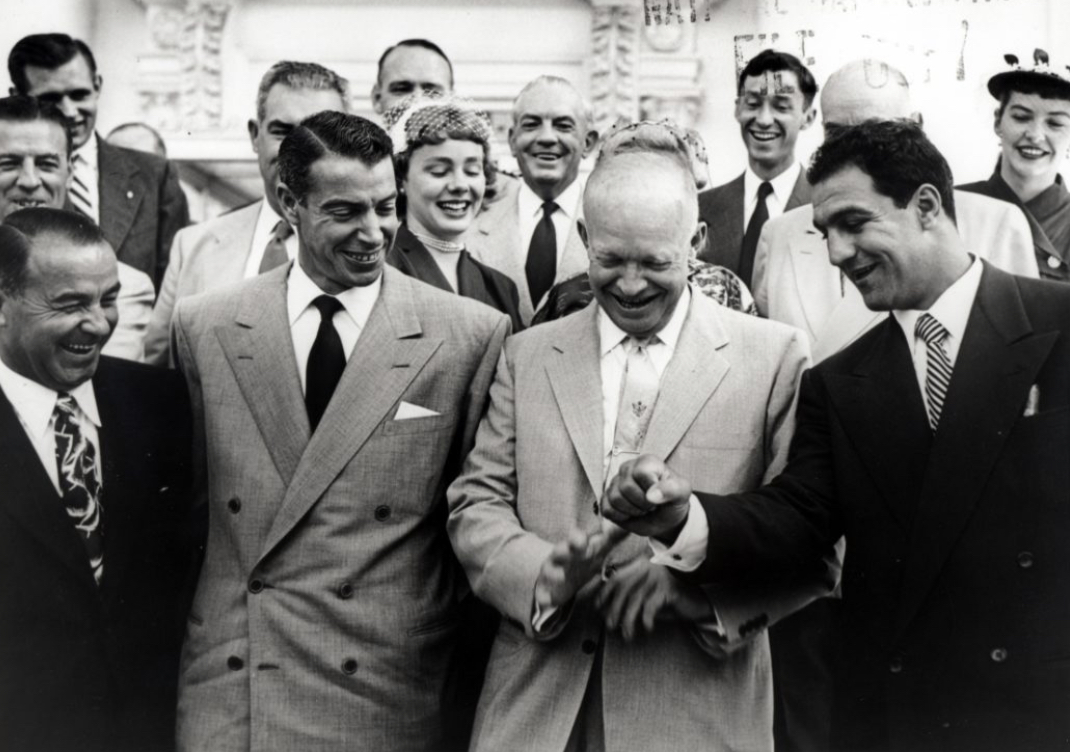
DiMaggio with President Dwight D. Eisenhower and Rocky Marciano in 1953

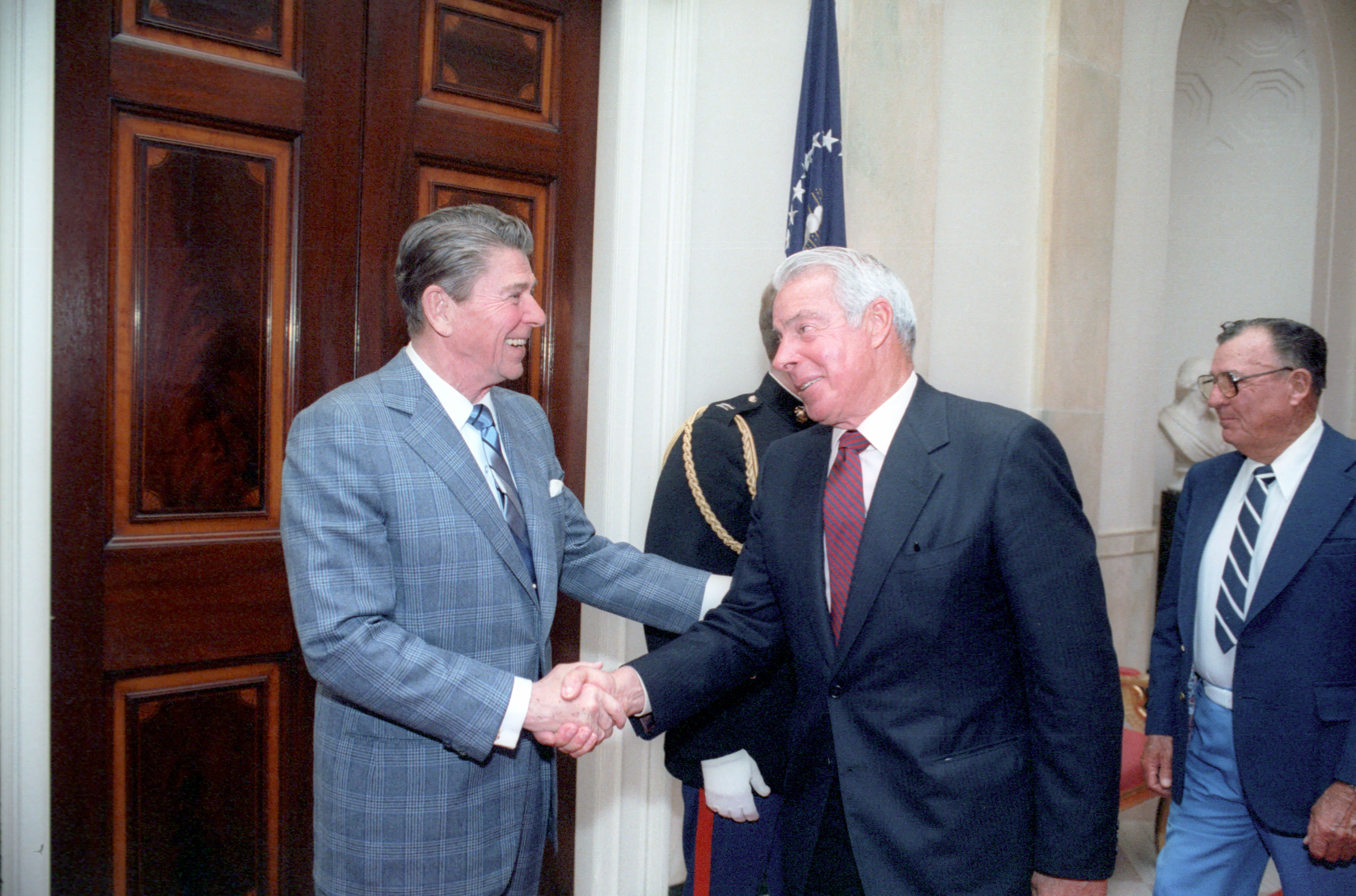
President Ronald Reagan and DiMaggio at the White House, March 27, 1981

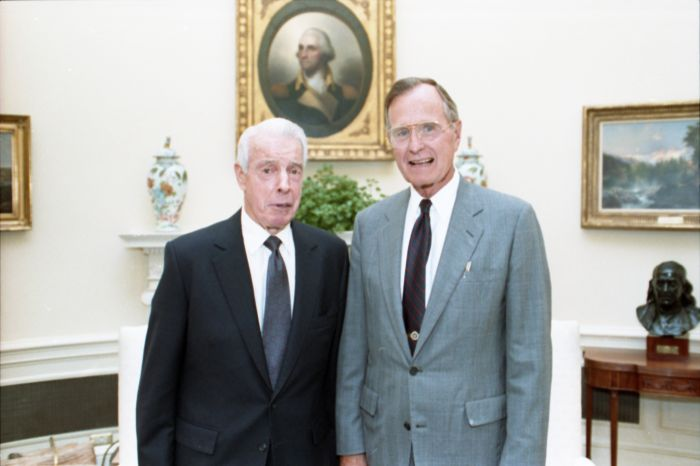
DiMaggio with President George H. W. Bush in 1991

An American icon, DiMaggio's popularity during his career was such that he was referred to in film, television, literature, art, and music both during his career and decades after he retired.

=== Art ===
- Pierre Bellocq: Canvas of Stars mural for Gallagher's Steak House (2006)
- Robert Casilla: The Continuity of Greatness
- Zenos Frudakis: bronze sculpture of DiMaggio for the Joe DiMaggio Children's Hospital
- Red Grooms: Joltin' Joe Takes a Swing installation (1985–1988)

=== Literature ===
- "The Ex-Athlete" is based on him in Joyce Carol Oates's 2000 novel Blonde.
- In Ernest Hemingway's 1952 novel, The Old Man and the Sea, Santiago is a fan of DiMaggio.

=== Music ===
- Betty Bonney and Les Brown: "Joltin' Joe DiMaggio"
- Simon & Garfunkel: "Mrs. Robinson" (Paul Simon performed the song on Joe DiMaggio Day in Yankee Stadium, a month after DiMaggio died.)
- Billy Joel: "We Didn't Start the Fire"
- Madonna: "Vogue"
- Vulfpeck: "1 for 1, DiMaggio"

=== Movies ===
- Blonde, played by Bobby Cannavale

=== Television ===
- DiMaggio is referenced in the Seinfeld episode "The Note" in which Kramer believes to have seen him at a local donut shop.
- The Bronx is Burning, played by Christopher McDonald

=== Theatre ===
- Bronx Bombers (2013) by Eric Simonson: DiMaggio is a character in the play.

== See also ==
- List of Major League Baseball career batting average leaders
- List of Major League Baseball career hits leaders
- List of Major League Baseball career home run leaders
- List of Major League Baseball career on-base percentage leaders
- List of Major League Baseball career OPS leaders
- List of Major League Baseball career runs batted in leaders
- List of Major League Baseball career slugging percentage leaders
- List of Major League Baseball career triples leaders
- List of Major League Baseball players to hit for the cycle
- List of Major League Baseball players who spent their entire career with one franchise

Awards and achievements
Preceded by Gee Walker; Vic Wertz	Hitting for the cycle July 9, 1937; May 20, 1948	Succeeded by Lou Gehrig; Wally Westlake
