= Roy Campanella =

American baseball player (1921–1993)

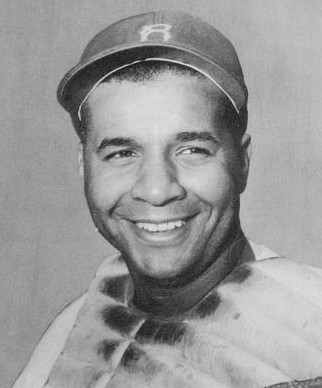
- Campanella with the Brooklyn Dodgers in 1956
- Catcher
- Born: November 19, 1921; Philadelphia, Pennsylvania, U.S.
- Died: June 26, 1993 (aged 71); Woodland Hills, California, U.S.
- Batted: Right Threw: Right

Professional debut
- NgL: 1937, for the Washington Elite Giants
- MLB: April 20, 1948, for the Brooklyn Dodgers

Last MLB appearance
- September 29, 1957, for the Brooklyn Dodgers

MLB statistics
- Batting average: .283
- Home runs: 260
- Runs batted in: 1,019
- Stats at Baseball Reference

Teams
- Washington / Baltimore Elite Giants (1937–1944); Philadelphia Stars (1944); Baltimore Elite Giants (1945); Brooklyn Dodgers (1948–1957)

Career highlights and awards
- 3× NgL All-Star (1941, 1944, 1945); 8× All-Star (1949–1956); World Series champion (1955); 3× NL MVP (1951, 1953, 1955); Negro National League batting champion (1944); NL RBI leader (1953); Los Angeles Dodgers No. 39 retired

Member of the National

Baseball Hall of Fame
- Induction: 1969
- Vote: 79.4% (seventh ballot)

Roy Campanella (November 19, 1921 – June 26, 1993), nicknamed "Campy", was an American professional baseball player, primarily as a catcher. The Philadelphia native played in the Negro leagues and Mexican League for nine years before entering the minor leagues in 1946. He made his Major League Baseball (MLB) debut in 1948 for the Brooklyn Dodgers, for whom he played until 1957. His playing career ended when he was paralyzed in an automobile crash in January 1958. A three-time MVP, he is considered one of the greatest catchers in the history of the game.

After he retired as a player as a result of the accident, Campanella held positions in scouting and community relations with the Dodgers. He was inducted into the Baseball Hall of Fame in 1969.

== Early life and education ==
Roy Campanella was born in Philadelphia on November 19, 1921 to parents Ida, who was African American, and John Campanella, the son of Italian immigrants. Roy was the youngest of the four children born to the couple. They first lived in Germantown, and then moved to Nicetown in North Philadelphia, where the children attended integrated schools.

He attended Gillespie Junior High School and Simon Gratz High School, although he left high school before graduating. Because of their mixed-race, Campanella and his siblings were sometimes taunted by other children in school who called them "half-breed". Campanella had athletic gifts that he used to great effect; he was elected captain of every sports team he played on in high school, but baseball was his passion.

== Playing career ==
=== Negro leagues ===
Of mixed race, Campanella was prohibited from MLB play as a result of the baseball color line. In 1937, at the age of 15, he began playing Negro league baseball for the Washington Elite Giants on weekends, subsequently dropping out of high school a few months later on his 16th birthday so he could play full time. The Elite Giants moved to Baltimore the following year, and Campanella became a star player with the team until 1945.

=== Mexican and Venezuelan leagues ===
During the 1942 season, Campanella left the Baltimore Elite Giants after a spat with owner Tom Wilson. He played the rest of the season and the following 1943 season in the Mexican League with the Sultanes de Monterrey. Lázaro Salazar, the team's manager, told Campanella that one day he would play at the major league level. Campanella subsequently returned to the Elite Giants for the 1944–45 seasons.

In 1946, Campanella played in the newly formed Venezuelan Professional Baseball League on the Sabios de Vargas team, which he was co-coach and led to the league championship.

=== Minor leagues ===
Campanella moved into the Brooklyn Dodgers' minor league system in 1946 as the Dodgers organization began preparations to break the MLB color barrier with Jackie Robinson. His easy-going personality and strong work ethic were credited with his being able to move successfully between the races. Although Branch Rickey considered hiring Campanella to break baseball's color barrier, Rickey ultimately decided upon Robinson.

For the 1946 season, Robinson was assigned to the Montreal Royals, the Dodgers' affiliate in the Class AAA International League. On March 18, 1946, Campanella signed a contract to play for Danville Dodgers of the Illinois–Indiana–Iowa League. After the general manager of the Danville Dodgers reported he did not feel the league was ready for racial integration, the organization sent Campanella and pitcher Don Newcombe to the Nashua Dodgers of the Class B New England League, where the Dodgers felt the climate would be more tolerant. The Nashua team thus became the first professional baseball team of the 20th century to field a racially integrated lineup in the United States.

Campanella's 1946 season proceeded largely without racist incidents and in one game Campanella assumed the managerial duties after manager Walter Alston was ejected. Campanella was the first African American to manage White players of an organized professional baseball team. Nashua was three runs down at the time Campanella took over. They came back to win, in part due to Campanella's decision to use Newcombe as a pinch hitter during the seventh inning; Newcombe hit a game-tying two-run home run.

=== Major League Baseball ===
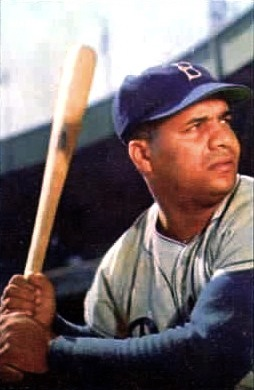
Campanella, circa 1953

Jackie Robinson's first season in the major leagues came in 1947, and Campanella began his MLB career with the Brooklyn Dodgers the following season, playing his first game on April 20, 1948. In later years, Robinson and his wife sometimes stayed with the Campanella family during some ballgames because adequate hotels for blacks could not be found in the city.

After spending most of the beginning of the 1948 season on the bench, Campanella was assigned to the Saint Paul Saints, the Dodgers' affiliate in the Class AAA American Association, where he resided in the Rondo neighborhood. On May 18, Campanella become the first person to break the color barrier in the American Association when he entered a game. By early July, after having success against the league's pitching, he returned to the Dodgers.

Campanella stayed at the Major League level and played for the Dodgers from July 1948 through 1957 as their regular catcher. In 1948, he had three different uniform numbers (33, 39, and 56) before settling on 39 for the rest of his career.

Campanella was selected to the All-Star Game every year from 1949 through 1956. With his 1949 All-Star selection, he was one of the first four African Americans so honored. (Jackie Robinson, Don Newcombe and Larry Doby were also All-Stars that year.) In 1950 Campanella hit home runs in five straight games; the only other Dodgers to homer in five consecutive games are Shawn Green (2001), Matt Kemp (2010), Adrián González (2014–15), Joc Pederson (2015), Max Muncy (2019), and Shohei Ohtani (2025).

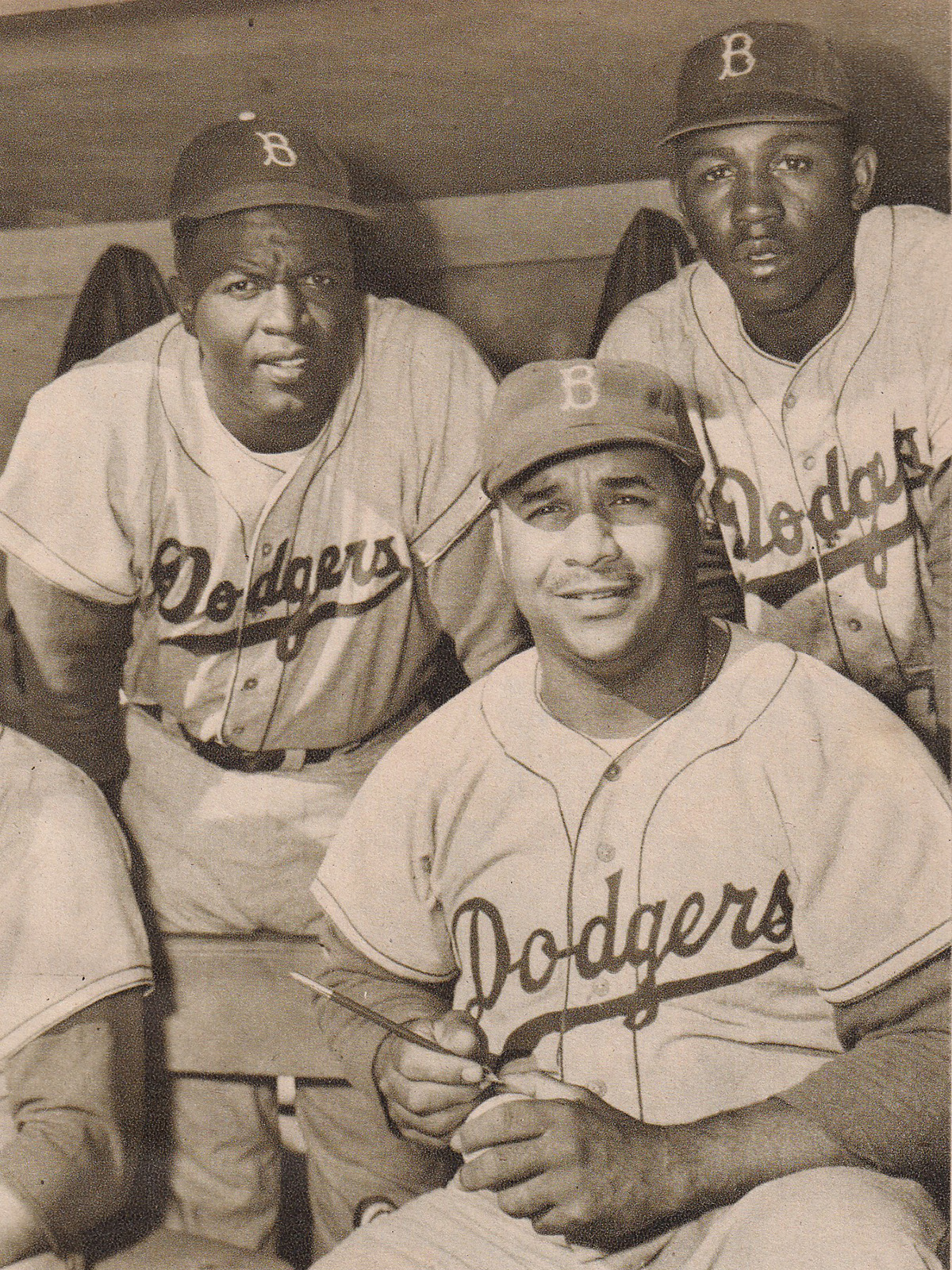
Campanella with teammates Jackie Robinson and Jim Gilliam in Japan, 1956

Campanella received the Most Valuable Player (MVP) award in the National League three times: in 1951, 1953, and 1955. In each of his MVP seasons, he batted over .300, hit more than 30 home runs, and had more than 100 runs batted in (RBI). His 142 RBI during 1953 exceeded the franchise record of 130, which had been held by Jack Fournier (1925) and Babe Herman (1930). Today, it is the second most in franchise history, Tommy Davis breaking it with 153 RBI in 1962. That same year, Campanella hit 40 home runs in games in which he appeared as a catcher, a record which lasted until 1996, when it was exceeded by Todd Hundley. In his career, he threw out 57% of the base runners who tried to steal a base on him, the highest percentage of any catcher in major league history. He also had four seasons where he threw out more than 60% of attempted base stealers.

In 1955, Campanella's final MVP season, he helped Brooklyn win its first World Series championship. After the Dodgers lost the first two games of the series to the Yankees, Campanella began Brooklyn's comeback by hitting a two-out, two-run home run in the first inning of Game 3. The Dodgers won that game, got another home run from Campanella in a Game 4 victory that tied the series, and then went on to claim the series in seven games when Johnny Podres shut out the Yankees 2–0 in Game 7.

Campanella caught three no-hitters during his career: Carl Erskine's two, on June 19, 1952 and May 12, 1956 and Sal Maglie's on September 25, 1956. "In my no-hitter...I only shook Campy off once," Maglie recalled. "He was doing the thinking, calling the pitches just right for every batter in every situation, and all I had to do was check the sign to see if I agreed and then throw."

After the 1957 season, the Brooklyn Dodgers relocated to Los Angeles and became the Los Angeles Dodgers, but Campanella's playing career came to an end as a result of an automobile accident. He never played a game for Los Angeles.

== Automobile crash ==
Campanella lived on East Island in Glen Cove, New York, on the North Shore of Long Island; he operated a liquor store in Harlem between regular-season games and during the off-season. After closing the store for the night on January 28, 1958, he began his drive home to Glen Cove. While he was traveling at about 30 mph (48 km/h), his rented 1957 Chevrolet sedan hit a patch of ice at an S-curve on Dosoris Lane near Apple Tree Lane in Glen Cove, skidded into a telephone pole, and overturned, breaking Campanella's neck. He fractured the fifth and sixth cervical vertebrae and compressed the spinal cord. The crash left Campanella paralyzed from the shoulders down. With physical therapy, he was eventually able to regain substantial use of his arms and hands. He was able to feed himself, shake hands, and gesture while speaking, but he required a wheelchair for mobility for the remainder of his life.

Campanella wrote his autobiography, It's Good to Be Alive, which was published in 1959; in it, he discussed his convalescence and partial recovery after the crash. Michael Landon directed a TV-movie based on the book, It's Good to Be Alive (1974), which was considerably fictionalized. Campanella was portrayed by Paul Winfield.

== Post-playing career ==
After his playing career and rehabilitation, Campanella remained involved with the Dodgers. In January 1959, the Dodgers named him assistant supervisor of scouting for the eastern United States and special coach at the team's annual spring training camp in Vero Beach, Florida, serving each year as a mentor and coach to young catchers in the Dodger organization.

On September 27, 1959, Campanella appeared as himself in an episode of Lassie called "The Mascot" in which he coached the Calverton boys' baseball team and advised Timmy about a matter of cheating.

On May 7, 1959, the Dodgers, then playing their second season in Los Angeles, honored him with "Roy Campanella Night" at the Los Angeles Memorial Coliseum. The New York Yankees agreed to make a special visit to Los Angeles (between road series in Kansas City and Chicago) to play an exhibition game against the Dodgers for the occasion.

The Yankees won the Thursday night game 6–2, with an attendance of 93,103, setting a record at that time for the largest crowd to attend a Major League Baseball game. The proceeds from the game went to defray Campanella's medical bills.

On March 28, 1970, Campanella was named manager of the West team in the East-West Major League Baseball Classic, a charity exhibition All-Star game held in honor of Martin Luther King Jr. It was the first time he wore his Dodgers uniform since his career-ending accident.

In 1978, Campanella moved to California and accepted a job with the Dodgers as assistant to the director of community relations, Don Newcombe, his former teammate and longtime friend.

A historic marker was installed in Nashua, New Hampshire by the Black Heritage Trail of New Hampshire to celebrate the achievements of Campanella and Newcombe in 2023.

== Personal life ==
Campanella was married three times. His first marriage, to Bernice Ray on January 3, 1939, ended in divorce. They had two daughters together.

On April 30, 1945, he married Ruthe Willis, who brought her son David to the marriage. They had three children together (including a son, Roy Campanella II, who became a television director). Their marriage deteriorated after Campanella's accident; they separated in 1960. Ruthe died of a heart attack at age 40 in January 1963.

On May 5, 1964, Campanella married Roxie Doles, who survived him.

=== Death ===
Campanella died of heart failure at age 71 on June 26, 1993, at his home in Woodland Hills, California. His body was cremated at the Forest Lawn, Hollywood Hills Cemetery in Los Angeles.

== Legacy ==
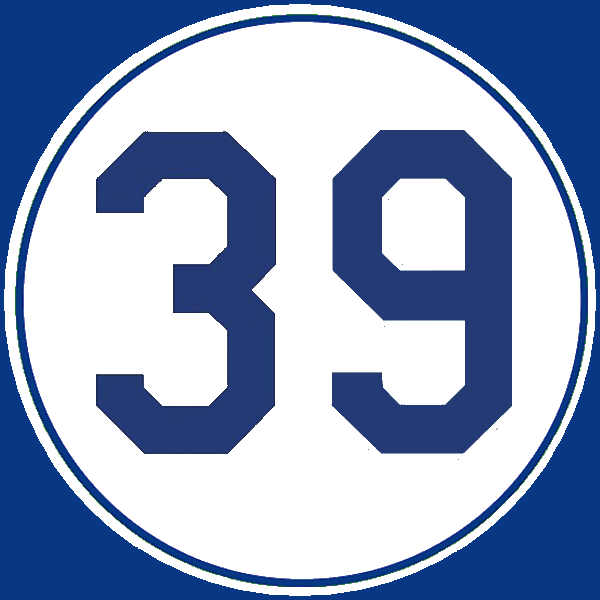
Roy Campanella's number 39 was retired by the Los Angeles Dodgers in 1972.

In July 1969, Campanella was inducted into the Baseball Hall of Fame in Cooperstown, the second player of black heritage so honored, after Jackie Robinson. The same year, he received the Bronze Medallion from the City of New York.

Campanella was elected to the Mexican Professional Baseball Hall Of Fame in 1971. On June 4, 1972, the Dodgers retired Campanella's uniform number 39 alongside Jackie Robinson's number 42 and Sandy Koufax's number 32.

In 1999, Campanella ranked number 50 on The Sporting News' list of the 100 Greatest Baseball Players, and was a nominee for the Major League Baseball All-Century Team. In 2020, The Athletic ranked Campanella at number 94 on its "Baseball 100" list, complied by sportswriter Joe Posnanski.

Campanella was featured on a United States postage stamp in 2006. The stamp is one of a block of four honoring baseball sluggers, the others being Mickey Mantle, Hank Greenberg, and Mel Ott.

In September 2006, the Los Angeles Dodgers announced the creation of the Roy Campanella Award. The club's players and coaches vote on it annually, and is given to the Dodger who best exemplifies "Campy's" spirit and leadership. Shortstop Rafael Furcal was named the inaugural winner of the award.

Campanella is mentioned in the lyrics of multiple songs, including "Did You See Jackie Robinson Hit that Ball?", written and recorded by Buddy Johnson in 1949 (and covered by Count Basie and his Orchestra that same year), "We Didn't Start the Fire" by Billy Joel, and in the refrain of "Talkin' Baseball" by Terry Cashman.

Roy Campanella Park, a recreation center operated by the Los Angeles County Department of Parks and Recreation in unincorporated West Rancho Dominguez, California, is named after him.

== See also ==
- List of Major League Baseball annual runs batted in leaders
- List of Major League Baseball career double plays as a catcher leaders
- List of Major League Baseball career putouts as a catcher leaders
- List of Major League Baseball career home run leaders
- List of Major League Baseball players who spent their entire career with one franchise
- List of Negro league baseball players who played in Major League Baseball
