= 2025 Junior League World Series =

Baseball tournament

Tournament information
- Location: Taylor, Michigan
- Dates: August 3–August 10

Final positions
- Champions: Taichung, Taiwan
- Runner-up: (Georgia (U.S. state)) Macon, Georgia

The 2025 Junior League World Series took place from August 3–10 in Taylor, Michigan. It is the fourth appearance of Taiwan's Taichung Municipal Chung-Shan Junior High School, who won the tournament in 2014, 2015, and 2022. They beat Macon, Georgia in the championship game.

== Teams ==
United States	International
(Michigan) Taylor, Michigan; District 5 (Taylor North); Host	Taichung, Taiwan; Chung-Shan Junior; Asia–Pacific
(Illinois) River Forest/Elmhurst, Illinois; River Forest/Elmhurst; Central	(Queensland) Brisbane, Queensland; Brisbane North; Australia
Wilmington, Delaware; Naamans; East	Kingston, Ontario; Kingston; Canada
(Georgia (U.S. state)) Macon, Georgia; Vine-Ingle; Southeast	(Germany) Mannheim, Germany; South-West Germany; Europe–Africa
(Texas) Needville, Texas; Needville; Southwest	Antón, Coclé Province, Panama; Antón; Latin America
(California) Santa Rosa, California; Mark West; West	Bayamón, Puerto Rico; Rexville; Puerto Rico

== Results ==
=== United States Bracket ===
Upper round 1
–	(Michigan) Host	3
–	Texas	0
—	California	0
—	Illinois	1
Lower round 1
0–1	California	5
1–1	(Michigan) Host	2
0–1	Texas	4
1–1	Illinois	1

Upper round 2
—	(Georgia (U.S. state)) Georgia	7
1—0	(Michigan) Host	4
—	Delaware (F/8)	7
1—0	Illinois	6
Lower round 2
1–1	California	4
1–1	Texas	9

Upper final
1–0	(Georgia (U.S. state)) Georgia (F/6)	12
1–0	Delaware	2
Lower final
1–1	Delaware	0
2–1	Texas	9

United States Championship
2–0	(Georgia (U.S. state)) Georgia	7
3–1	Texas	6

=== International Bracket ===
Upper round 1
–	Puerto Rico	1
–	Germany	2
–	Taiwan (F/6)	11
–	Panama	0
Lower round 1
0–1	Panama	6
0–1	Australia	3
0–1	Puerto Rico	7
0–1	Canada	4

Upper round 2
–	Australia	3
1–0	Germany (F/8)	4
–	Canada	0
1–0	Taiwan (F/5)	13
Lower round 2
1–1	Panama	4
1–1	Puerto Rico	0

Upper final
2–0	Germany	1
2–0	Taiwan (F/5)	12
Lower final
2–1	Germany	3
2–1	Panama	9

International Championship
3–0	Taiwan	9
3–1	Panama	0

=== World Championship ===
World Championship
3–0	(Georgia (U.S. state)) Georgia	1
4–0	Taiwan	8

2025 Junior League World Series Champions
Chung-Shan Junior High School
Taichung, Taiwan
