= 2005 Junior League World Series =

Tournament information
- Location: Taylor, Michigan
- Dates: August 14–20

Final positions
- Champions: Panama City, Panama
- Runner-up: Tarpon Springs, Florida

The 2005 Junior League World Series took place from August 14–20 in Taylor, Michigan, United States. Panama City, Panama defeated Tarpon Springs, Florida in the championship game.

== Teams ==
United States	International
Fort Wayne, Indiana; St. Joes Central; Central	(Northern Mariana Islands) Saipan, Northern Mariana Islands; Saipan; Asia–Pacific
Freehold Township, New Jersey; Freehold Township; East	Ottawa, Ontario; Orleans; Canada
Tarpon Springs, Florida; East Lake; Southeast	Rotterdam, Netherlands; Rotterdam/Rijnmond; EMEA
Fort Worth, Texas; West Side Lions; Southwest	Panama City, Panama; Curundu; Latin America
Pearl City, Hawaii; Pearl City; West	Arroyo, Puerto Rico; Hermanos Cruz; Puerto Rico

== Results ==
United States Pool

Team	W	L	Rs	Ra
Florida	3	1	26	28
Hawaii	3	1	32	20
Texas	2	2	27	12
New Jersey	2	2	23	19
Indiana	0	4	11	40

	(Florida)	(Hawaii)	(Indiana)	(New Jersey)	(Texas)
Florida	–	12–7	10–6	3–1	1–14
Hawaii	7–12	–	10–0	11–5	4–3
Indiana	6–10	0–10	–	5–10	0–10
New Jersey	1–3	5–11	10–5	–	7–0
Texas	14–1	3–4	10–0	0–7	–

International Pool

Team	W	L	Rs	Ra
Puerto Rico	4	0	38	10
Panama	3	1	24	6
Canada	2	2	25	28
Northern Mariana Islands	1	3	18	24
Netherlands	0	4	6	43

	(Canada)	(Netherlands)	(Northern Mariana Islands)	(Panama)	(Puerto Rico)
Canada	–	10–1	9–8^{(8)}	0–4	6–15
Netherlands	1–10	–	3–6	0–12	2–15
Northern Mariana Islands	8–9^{(8)}	6–3	–	2–8	2–4
Panama	4–0	12–0	8–2	–	0–4
Puerto Rico	15–6	15–2	4–2	4–0	–

Elimination Round

Semifinals
3–1	Florida	7
3–1	Hawaii	6
4–0	Puerto Rico	2
3–1	Panama	7

World Championship
4–1	Florida	0
4–1	Panama	3

2005 Junior League World Series Champions
Curundu LL
Panama City, Panama
