= 2006 Junior League World Series =

Tournament information
- Location: Taylor, Michigan
- Dates: August 13–19

Final positions
- Champions: El Campo, Texas
- Runner-up: Guaymas, Mexico

The 2006 Junior League World Series took place from August 13–19 in Taylor, Michigan, United States. El Campo, Texas defeated Guaymas, Mexico in the championship game.

== Teams ==
United States	International
South Bend, Indiana; South Bend Eastside; Central	(Indonesia) Jakarta, Indonesia; Jakarta; Asia–Pacific
Cumberland, New Jersey; North Cumberland; East	Ottawa, Ontario; East Nepean; Canada
Alexandria, Virginia; Woodlawn; Southeast	Ramstein, Germany; Ramstein-American; EMEA
El Campo, Texas; El Campo; Southwest	Maracaibo, Venezuela; Coquivacao; Latin America
Pearl City, Hawaii; Pearl City; West	Guaymas, Sonora; Guaymas Sector Pesca; Mexico

== Results ==
United States Pool

Team	W	L	Rs	Ra
Texas	3	1	33	32
Hawaii	3	1	18	21
New Jersey	2	2	14	20
Indiana	1	3	12	18
Virginia	1	3	23	30

	(Hawaii)	(Indiana)	(New Jersey)	(Texas)	(Virginia)
Hawaii	–	5–1	5–4	0–9	8–7
Indiana	1–5	–	3–4	1–5	7–4
New Jersey	4–5	4–3	–	0–10	6–1
Texas	9–0	5–1	10–0	–	9–11
Virginia	7–8	4–7	1–6	11–9	–

International Pool

Team	W	L	Rs	Ra
Venezuela	4	0	36	2
Mexico	2	2	15	14
Canada	2	2	20	19
Germany	1	3	17	40
Indonesia	1	3	14	27

	(Canada)	(Germany)	(Indonesia)	(Mexico)	(Venezuela)
Canada	–	13–3	4–3^{(8)}	2–7	1–6
Germany	3–13	–	10–8	3–6	1–13
Indonesia	3–4^{(8)}	8–10	–	3–2	0–11
Mexico	7–2	6–3	2–3	–	0–6
Venezuela	6–1	13–1	11–0	6–0	–

Elimination Round

Semifinals
3–1	Texas	4
3–1	Hawaii	0
4–0	Venezuela	4
2–2	Mexico	6

World Championship
4–1	Texas	2
3–2	Mexico	1

2006 Junior League World Series Champions
El Campo LL
El Campo, Texas
