= 2004 Junior League World Series =

Tournament information
- Location: Taylor, Michigan
- Dates: August 15–21

Final positions
- Champions: Tampa, Florida
- Runner-up: Punto Fijo, Venezuela

The 2004 Junior League World Series took place from August 15–21 in Taylor, Michigan, United States. Tampa, Florida defeated Punto Fijo, Venezuela in the championship game.

== Teams ==
United States	International
Ankeny, Iowa; Ankeny; Central	(Northern Mariana Islands) Saipan, Northern Mariana Islands; Saipan; Asia–Pacific
(New York (state)) Massapequa Park, New York; Massapequa Coast; East	Moose Jaw, Saskatchewan; Moose Jaw; Canada
Tampa, Florida; Palma Ceia/Bayshore; Southeast	Mons, Belgium; SHAPE/Waterloo; EMEA
Fort Worth, Texas; West Side Lions; Southwest	Punto Fijo, Venezuela; Paraguana; Latin America
Pearl City, Hawaii; Pearl City; West	Guaymas, Sonora; Guaymas; Mexico

== Results ==
United States Pool

Team	W	L	Rs	Ra
Florida	4	0	46	32
Hawaii	3	1	30	20
Iowa	2	2	38	24
Texas	1	3	27	46
(New York (state)) New York	0	4	9	27

	(Florida)	(Hawaii)	(Iowa)	(New York (state))	(Texas)
Florida	–	10–9	12–7	3–1	21–15
Hawaii	9–10	–	9–8	9–1	3–1
Iowa	7–12	8–9	–	7–1	16–3
New York (New York (state))	1–3	1–9	1–7	–	6–8
Texas	15–21	1–3	3–16	8–6	–

International Pool

Team	W	L	Rs	Ra
Venezuela	4	0	39	13
Mexico	3	1	31	16
Canada	1	3	14	25
Northern Mariana Islands	1	3	13	16
Belgium	1	3	9	38

	(Belgium)	(Canada)	(Mexico)	(Northern Mariana Islands)	(Venezuela)
Belgium	–	6–5	0–13	1–8	2–12
Canada	5–6	–	1–3	8–3	0–13
Mexico	13–0	3–1	–	4–2	11–13
Northern Mariana Islands	8–1	3–8	2–4	–	0–1
Venezuela	12–2	13–0	13–11	1–0	–

Elimination Round

Semifinals
4–0	Florida	5
3–1	Hawaii	0
4–0	Venezuela	2
3–1	Mexico	0

World Championship
5–0	Florida	5
5–0	Venezuela	2

2004 Junior League World Series Champions
Palma Ceia/Bayshore LL
Tampa, Florida
