= Junior League World Series (West Region) =

West Region
- Most recent season or competition: 2026 Junior League World Series
- Sport: Baseball
- Founded: 1981
- No. of teams: 12
- Country: United States
- Most recent champion: La Mirada, California
- Most titles: Southern California (19)

The Junior League World Series West Region is one of six United States regions that currently sends teams to the World Series in Taylor, Michigan. The region's participation in the JLWS dates back to 1981. It has produced the most JLWS championships (11) by any region.

== West Region States ==
- Alaska
- Arizona
- Northern California
- Southern California
- Hawaii
- Idaho
- Montana
- Nevada
- Oregon
- Utah
- Washington
- Wyoming

== Region Champions ==
As of the 2026 Junior League World Series.

| Year | City | JLWS | Record |
|---|---|---|---|
| 1981 | Bassett, Southern California | Third Place | 1–2 |
| 1982 | Huntington Beach, Southern California | Fourth Place | 1–2 |
| 1983 | Northridge, Southern California | Third Place | 3–2 |
| 1984 | Pearl City, Hawaii | Champions | 3–0 |
| 1985 | Fullerton, Southern California | Round 1 | 0–2 |
| 1986 | Union City, Northern California | Round 2 | 1–2 |
| 1987 | Rowland Heights, Southern California | Champions | 5–1 |
| 1988 | Hilo, Hawaii | Runner-up | 3–2 |
| 1989 | Pearl City, Hawaii | Third Place | 3–2 |
| 1990 | Aiea, Hawaii | Fourth Place | 2–2 |
| 1991 | Henderson, Nevada | Runner-up | 4–2 |
| 1992 | Tucson, Arizona | Champions | 6–1 |
| 1993 | Sunnyvale, Northern California | Fourth Place | 2–2 |
| 1994 | Thousand Oaks, Southern California | Champions | 4–0 |
| 1995 | Northridge, Southern California | Runner-up | 5–2 |
| 1996 | Aiea, Hawaii | Runner-up | 3–2 |
| 1997 | Mission Viejo, Southern California | Runner-up | 3–2 |
| 1998 | Mission Viejo, Southern California | Champions | 6–1 |
| 1999 | La Verne, Southern California | Round 1 | 0–2 |
| 2000 | Aiea, Hawaii | Champions | 4–0 |
| 2001 | Aiea, Hawaii | Champions | 4–1 |
| 2002 | Yucaipa, Southern California | US Final | 3–2 |
| 2003 | La Mirada, Southern California | Champions | 5–1 |
| 2004 | Pearl City, Hawaii | US Final | 3–2 |
| 2005 | Pearl City, Hawaii | US Final | 3–2 |
| 2006 | Pearl City, Hawaii | US Final | 3–2 |
| 2007 | Pearl City, Hawaii | Champions | 6–0 |
| 2008 | Hilo, Hawaii | Runner-up | 4–2 |
| 2009 | Scottsdale, Arizona | Champions | 6–0 |
| 2010 | El Monte, Southern California | US Final | 3–2 |
| 2011 | Tucson, Arizona | US Final | 3–2 |
| 2012 | Manhattan Beach, Southern California | Pool stage | 1–3 |
| 2013 | Rio Rico, Arizona | Runner-up | 4–2 |
| 2014 | Manhattan Beach, Southern California | US Final | 3–2 |
| 2015 | Pearl City, Hawaii | Pool stage | 2–2 |
| 2016 | Kapaa, Hawaii | Runner-up | 3–1 |
| 2017 | Encinitas, Southern California | Round 3 | 2–2 |
| 2018 | Manhattan Beach, Southern California | US Final | 3–2 |
| 2019 | Fullerton, Southern California | Champions | 4–0 |
| 2020 | Cancelled due to COVID-19 pandemic | | |
| 2021 | Cancelled due to COVID-19 pandemic | | |
| 2022 | Honolulu, Hawaii | Round 1 | 1–2 |
| 2023 | Honolulu, Hawaii | Round 1 | 1–2 |
| 2024 | Honolulu, Hawaii | Round 1 | 0–2 |
| 2025 | Santa Rosa, Northern California | Round 2 | 1–2 |
| 2026 | La Mirada, Southern California | Champions | 4–0 |

=== Results by State ===
As of the 2026 Junior League World Series.

| State | Region Championships | JLWS Championships | Record | PCT |
|---|---|---|---|---|
| Southern California | 19 | 6 | 56–30 | .651 |
| Hawaii | 17 | 4 | 48–26 | .649 |
| Arizona | 4 | 2 | 19–5 | .792 |
| Northern California | 3 | 0 | 4–6 | .400 |
| Nevada | 1 | 0 | 4–2 | .667 |
| Total | 44 | 12 | 131–69 | .655 |

== See also ==
West Region in other Little League divisions

- Little League – West 1957-2000
  - Little League – Northwest
  - Little League – West
- Intermediate League
- Senior League
- Big League
