= 2007 Junior League World Series =

Tournament information
- Location: Taylor, Michigan
- Dates: August 12–18

Final positions
- Champions: Pearl City, Hawaii
- Runner-up: Makati, Philippines

The 2007 Junior League World Series took place from August 12–18 in Taylor, Michigan, United States. Pearl City, Hawaii defeated Makati, Philippines in the championship game.

== Teams ==
United States	International
Glendale, Wisconsin; Glendale; Central	Makati, Philippines; Illam Central; Asia–Pacific
Middletown, New Jersey; Middletown; East	Surrey, British Columbia; Whalley; Canada
Anderson, South Carolina; Anderson YMCA; Southeast	Kirovohrad, Ukraine; Kirovograd/Rivne; EMEA
Laredo, Texas; Del Mar; Southwest	(United States Virgin Islands) St. Thomas, U.S. Virgin Islands; Elrod Hendricks West; Latin America
Pearl City, Hawaii; Pearl City; West	Guayama, Puerto Rico; Radames Lopez; Puerto Rico

== Results ==
United States Pool

Team	W	L	Rs	Ra
Hawaii	4	0	32	9
Texas	3	1	13	4
New Jersey	2	2	18	9
Wisconsin	1	3	17	22
South Carolina	0	4	12	48

	(Hawaii)	(New Jersey)	(South Carolina)	(Texas)	(Wisconsin)
Hawaii	–	3–2	17–7	3–0	9–0
New Jersey	2–3	–	11–1	0–1	5–4
South Carolina	7–17	1–11	–	1–7	3–13
Texas	0–3	1–0	7–1	–	5–0
Wisconsin	0–9	4–5	13–3	0–5	–

International Pool

Team	W	L	Rs	Ra
Philippines	4	0	29	4
Canada	3	1	40	21
(United States Virgin Islands) U.S. Virgin Islands	2	2	20	22
Puerto Rico	1	3	17	23
Ukraine	0	4	11	47

	(Canada)	(Philippines)	(Puerto Rico)	(Ukraine)	(United States Virgin Islands)
Canada	–	3–6	12–6	16–6	9–3
Philippines	6–3	–	6–0	11–0	6–1
Puerto Rico	6–12	0–6	–	8–1	3–4
Ukraine	6–16	0–11	1–8	–	4–12
U.S. Virgin Islands (United States Virgin Islands)	3–9	1–6	4–3	12–4	–

Elimination Round

Semifinals
4–0	Hawaii	4
3–1	Texas	1
4–0	Philippines	8
3–1	Canada	1

World Championship
5–0	Hawaii	6
5–0	Philippines	2

2007 Junior League World Series Champions
Pearl City LL
Pearl City, Hawaii
