= Gu Lin Ruei-yang =

Taiwanese baseball pitcher (born 2000)

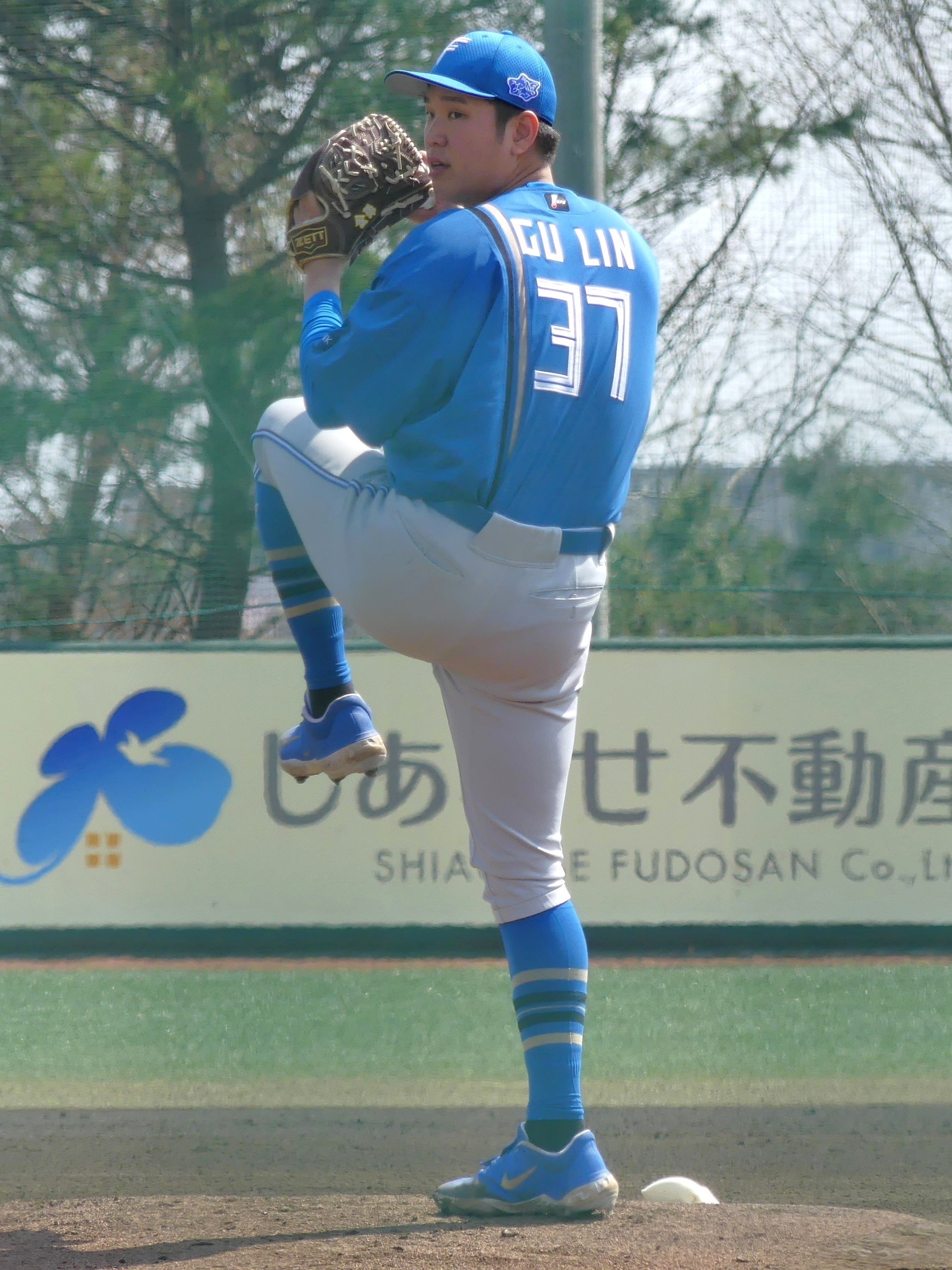
- Gu Lin with the Hokkaido Nippon-Ham Fighters in 2025

Hokkaido Nippon-Ham Fighters – No. 37
- Pitcher
- Born: 12 June 2000 (age 25); Taichung, Taiwan
- Bats: Right Throws: Right

Professional debut
- CPBL: 27 September, 2019, for the Uni-President 7-Eleven Lions
- NPB: 23 April, 2025, for the Hokkaido Nippon-Ham Fighters

CPBL statistics (through 2024 season)
- Win–loss record: 32−15
- Earned run average: 2.48
- Strikeouts: 398

NPB statistics (through April 5, 2026)
- Win–loss record: 2−3
- Earned run average: 3.60
- Strikeouts: 37
- Stats at Baseball Reference

Teams
- Uni-President Lions (2019–2024); Hokkaido Nippon-Ham Fighters (2025–present)

Career highlights and awards
- CPBL MVP (2024)
Medals
Representing Chinese Taipei
Men's baseball
Asian Games
Silver medal – second place	2022 Hangzhou	Team
Asia Professional Baseball Championship
Bronze medal – third place	2023 Tokyo	Team

Gu Lin Ruei-yang (Chinese: 古林睿煬; born 12 June 2000) is a Taiwanese professional baseball pitcher for the Hokkaido Nippon-Ham Fighters of Nippon Professional Baseball (NPB). He previously played in the Chinese Professional Baseball League (CPBL) for the Uni-President 7-Eleven Lions.

== Amateur career ==
Gu Lin was born in Taichung City on 12 June 2000, and was introduced to baseball by coach Lai Chao-jung while attending Taichung Chung-Hsiao Elementary School, located the city's West District. While attending Taichung Municipal Chung-Shan Junior High School, Gu Lin pitched in the 2014 and 2015 editions of the Junior League World Series. This resulted in two straight wins for Taichung Chung-Shan at the tournament, and three consecutive championships for Taiwanese teams overall. Gu Lin continued his baseball career at Taoyuan Municipal Ping Jen Senior High School, and pitched one game during the 2017 U-18 Baseball World Cup.

== Professional career ==
=== Uni-President 7-Eleven Lions ===
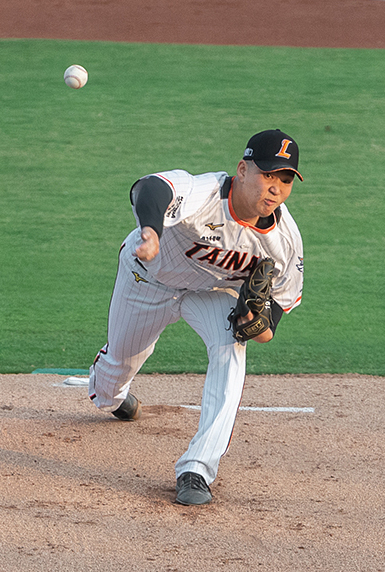
Gu Lin with the Uni-President 7-Eleven Lions on Opening Day 2021

Gu Lin was selected out of high school as the second overall pick in the 2018 Chinese Professional Baseball League draft. Gu Lin made his CPBL debut for the Uni-President 7-Eleven Lions on 27 September 2019, which the Lions acknowledged by issuing the first "debut certificates" in CPBL history to five hundred fans. Gu Lin recorded his first career victory on 1 July 2020. He was not a full-time starting pitcher until the 2021 season. On 13 March 2021, he became the youngest Opening Day starting pitcher in CPBL history at 20 years and 274 days old. His 2021 and 2022 seasons were slowed by injury.

Gu Lin led his team to the best-of-five first round of the 2023 CBPL playoffs. After the Lions' season ended, Gu Lin pitched in the Asia Professional Baseball Championship, winning a bronze medal with Taiwan. He had also appeared in the postponed 2022 Asian Games, where Taiwan won the silver medal in baseball.

Gu Lin started his second career Opening Day game on 31 March 2024. In the 2024 regular season, Gu Lin recorded a 1.66 ERA alongside 10 wins and threw 125 innings over 21 starts. Each statistic was a career best. Gu Lin started the first game of the 2024 Taiwan Series, and was removed from the game due to injury, then missed the rest of the series. Although the Lions lost the Taiwan Series in five games, Gu Lin won the CPBL's Best Nine Award at pitcher and the league's MVP. Gu Lin became the first Taiwanese pitcher to be named the CPBL MVP since 2006. Due to the injury during his only Taiwan Series game, Gu Lin was not rostered for the 2024 WBSC Premier12, which Taiwan won.

=== Hokkaido Nippon-Ham Fighters ===
In November 2024, Gu Lin was posted to Nippon Professional Baseball, and negotiated a three-year contract with the Hokkaido Nippon-Ham Fighters. Ryo Koma, a Japanese-born classmate and baseball teammate of his at Taoyuan Ping Jen, served as Gu Lin's translator when he began his NPB career.

Gu Lin made his NPB debut on 23 April 2025, pitching 5 2/3 innings in a loss. Gu Lin recorded his first NPB win on 2 May, which was also the first win by a Taiwanese pitcher in four NBP seasons, as well as the first win by a pitcher who had started his career in the CBPL since 2007. Gu Lin pitched a complete game shutout on 98 pitches on 10 May, a performance that qualified as a Maddux. He became the third Taiwanese pitcher to throw a Maddux in Nippon Professional Baseball. The feat had previously been achieved by Wei-Yin Chen in 2011. Gu Lin was demoted to the second team on 22 May. Gu Lin threw 2 1/3 innings in his next first team appearance on 3 June, was removed due to an abdominal injury, and expected to miss significant time. In mid-September, Gu Lin pitched out of the bullpen for the first team.

== International career ==
Gu Lin was named to the Taiwanese roster for the 2026 World Baseball Classic. He was considered one of the team's top pitchers, alongside Hsu Jo-hsi. Gu Lin started Taiwan's final game of Pool C play against South Korea, pitching four innings of a game Taiwan won 5–4. Gu Lin said of the matchup, "South Korea is super tough, but we are also super tough!", and was quoted by President Lai Ching-te in a congratulatory statement. However, South Korea advanced to the quarter-finals despite Gu Lin's performance on the following day, eliminating Taiwan from the tournament.

== Personal life ==
Gu Lin Ruei-yang is of Atayal descent, and was known as Lin Ruei-yang until adding his mother's surname to his full name. Gu Lin Ruei-yang's brother, Gu Lin Ruei-chen, is four years older than him, and also played amateur baseball. As Gu Lin started his professional baseball career in 2018, both his father and grandfather died.

Gu Lin Ruei-yang is married. He is known as "Taiwan's Golden Grandson".
