= 2024 Junior League World Series =

International children's baseball competition

Tournament information
- Location: Taylor, Michigan
- Dates: August 4–August 11

Final positions
- Champions: Taoyuan, Taiwan
- Runner-up: Taylor, Michigan

The 2024 Junior League World Series took place from August 4–11 in Taylor, Michigan. Taoyuan, Taiwan defeated Taylor, Michigan in the championship game, which was a rematch of the previous year's championship game.

== Teams ==
United States	International
(Michigan) Taylor, Michigan; District 5 (Taylor North); Host	Taoyuan, Taiwan; Shing-Ming; Asia–Pacific
(Illinois) River Forest/Elmhurst, Illinois; River Forest/Elmhurst; Central	(New South Wales) Sydney, New South Wales; Cronulla Black; Australia
(Pennsylvania) DuBois, Pennsylvania; DuBois; East	North Vancouver, British Columbia; Mount Seymour; Canada
(Florida) Tampa, Florida; Keystone; Southeast	(Spain) Barcelona, Spain; Catalunya; Europe–Africa
(Texas) New Braunfels, Texas; New Braunfels; Southwest	(Nicaragua) Rivas, Nicaragua; Rivas; Latin America
(Hawaii) Honolulu, Hawaii; Honolulu; West	Matamoros, Tamaulipas; Matamoros; Mexico

== Results ==
United States Bracket

—
—	Florida (F/5)	13
—	Pennsylvania	2
—	Hawaii	0
—	Michigan	8
Lower round 1
0–1	Hawaii	1
1–1	Florida	5
0–1	Pennsylvania	8
0–1	Illinois	4

—
–	Texas	9
1–0	Florida	8
–	Illinois	0
1–0	Michigan (F/5)	13
Lower round 2
2–1	Florida	6
1–1	Pennsylvania	4

—
1–0	Texas	5
2–0	Michigan	9
Lower final
1–1	Texas	4
3–1	Florida	7

United States Championship
3–0	Michigan	9
4–1	Florida	7

International Bracket

—
—	Canada	6
—	Australia	2
—	Spain	0
—	Nicaragua	5
Lower round 1
0–1	Australia	0
1–1	Nicaragua	4
0–1	Mexico	1
0–1	Spain	0

—
–	Mexico	2
1–0	Canada	3
–	Taiwan	5
1–0	Nicaragua	2
Lower round 2
2–1	Nicaragua	3
1–1	Mexico	0

—
2–0	Canada	0
1–0	Taiwan (F/5)	13
Lower final
2–1	Canada	0
3–1	Nicaragua (F/4)	15

International Championship
2–0	Taiwan	4
4–1	Nicaragua	0

Elimination Round

Semifinals
3–0	Michigan	9
4–1	Florida	7
2–0	Taiwan	4
4–1	Nicaragua	0

World Championship
4–0	Michigan	0
3–0	Taiwan	5

2024 Junior League World Series Champions
Shing-Ming LL
Taoyuan, Taiwan
