= Verena Mei =

American racing driver

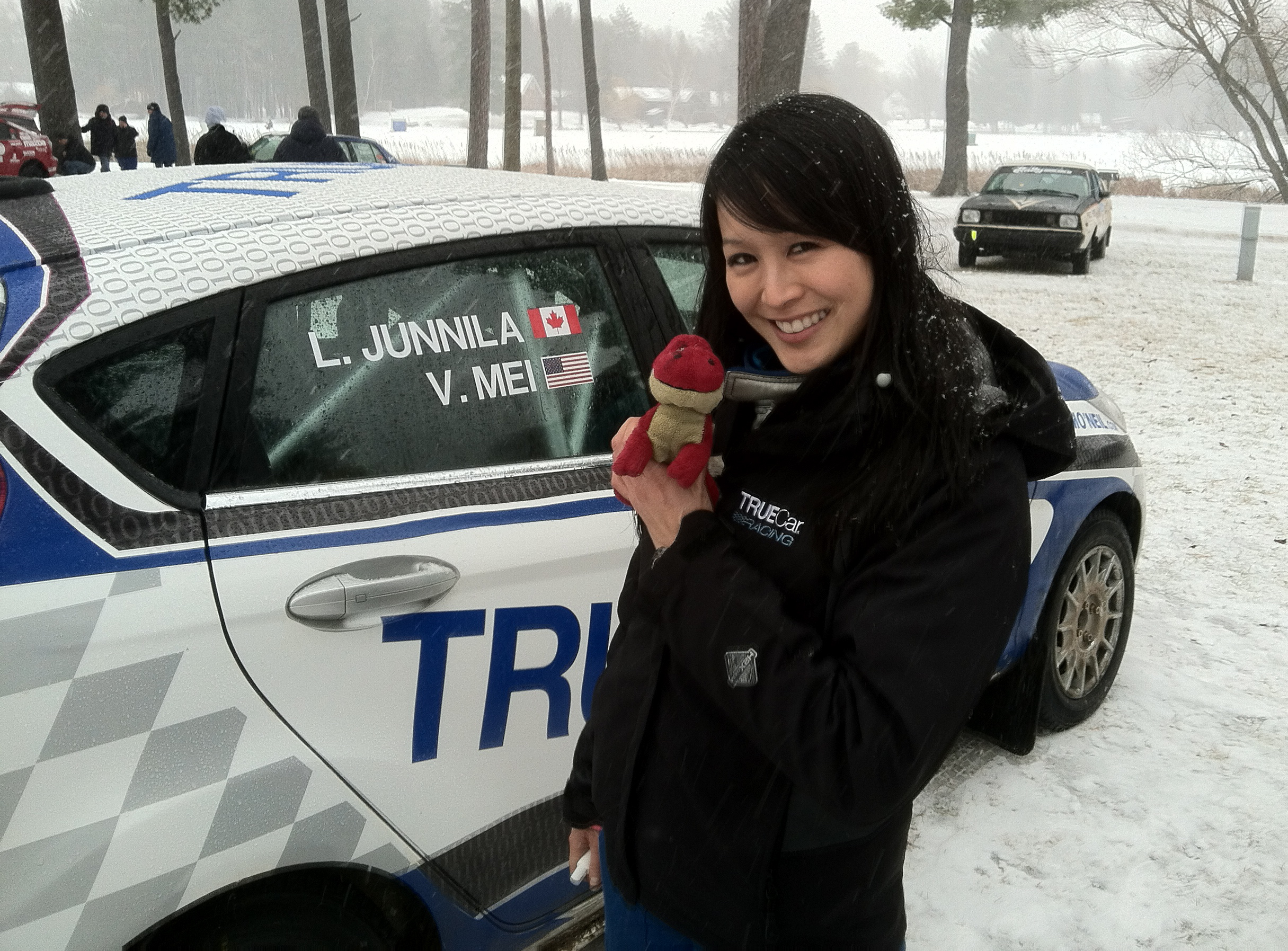
- Mei at the Sno*Drift 2012
- Born: Pearl City, Hawaii, U.S.
- Occupations: Model, rally car driver
- Known for: First female to win the Redline Time Attack Series; Rally America B-Spec National Champion

Verena Mei
Personal information
- Years active: 2002–present

Sport
- Sport: Rally racing

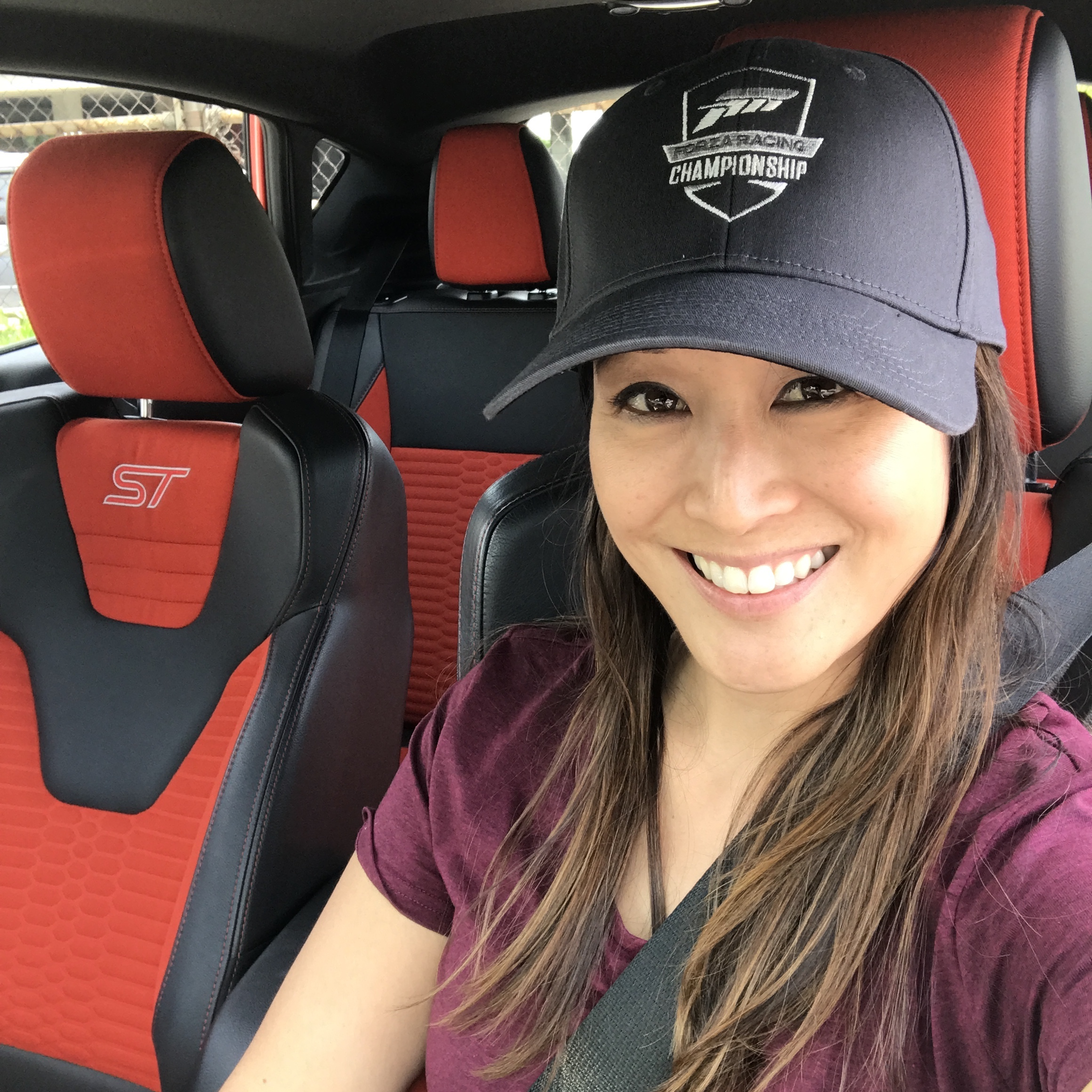
Verena Mei

Verena Mei (born in Pearl City, Hawaii) is a Chinese-American model and rally car driver.

== Modeling and acting career ==
Mei began her career as a poster model for tire companies. Mei is credited with minor appearances in Carolina, Rush Hour 2, and The Fast and the Furious: Tokyo Drift.

== Racing career ==
In 2002, Mei entered a stunt driving school and earned a professional competition drag racing license. Mei competed in Formula Drift for five years and became the first female to win the Redline Time Attack Series.

In 2012, Mei won the Rally America B-Spec National Championship together with co-driver Leanna Junnila in their first year of competition, becoming the first all-female team to ever win a national title in the history of Rally America.
