= Junior League World Series (Asia–Pacific Region) =

Asia–Pacific Region
- Most recent season or competition: 2026 Junior League World Series
- Sport: Baseball
- Founded: 1999
- Most recent champion: Taoyuan, Taiwan
- Most titles: Taiwan (15)

The Junior League World Series Asia–Pacific Region (formally the Far East Region) is one of six International regions that currently sends teams to the World Series in Taylor, Michigan. The region's participation in the JLWS dates back to 1999.

== Asia–Pacific region countries ==
- China
- Guam
- Hong Kong
- India
- Indonesia
- Northern Mariana Islands
- Philippines
- Taiwan

== Region champions ==
As of the 2026 Junior League World Series.

Year	City	JLWS	Record
1999	Hagåtña, Guam	Round 3	1–2
2000	Hagåtña, Guam	Round 2	1–2
2001	Saipan, Northern Mariana Islands	Pool stage	1–2
2002	Saipan, Northern Mariana Islands	Pool stage	0–3
2003	Saipan, Northern Mariana Islands	Pool stage	0–3
2004	Saipan, Northern Mariana Islands	Pool stage	1–3
2005	Saipan, Northern Mariana Islands	Pool stage	1–3
2006	Jakarta, Indonesia	Pool stage	1–3
2007	Makati, Philippines	Runner-up	5–1
2008	Makati, Philippines	Pool stage	2–2
2009	Saipan, Northern Mariana Islands	Pool stage	2–2
2010	Taipei, Taiwan	Champions	6–0
2011	Taoyuan, Taiwan	Runner-up	5–1
2012	Tainan, Taiwan	Pool stage	2–2
2013	Taoyuan, Taiwan	Champions	6–0
2014	Taichung, Taiwan	Champions	6–0
2015	Taichung, Taiwan	Champions	6–0
2016	Taoyuan, Taiwan	Champions	5–0
2017	Taoyuan, Taiwan	Champions	5–0
2018	Taoyuan, Taiwan	Champions	4–0
2019	Taoyuan, Taiwan	Int'l Final	3–1
2020	Cancelled due to COVID-19 pandemic		
2021	Cancelled due to COVID-19 pandemic		
2022	Taichung, Taiwan	Champions	5–0
2023	Taoyuan, Taiwan	Champions	5–1
2024	Taoyuan, Taiwan	Champions	4–0
2025	Taichung, Taiwan	Champions	5–0
2026	Taoyuan, Taiwan	Runner-up	3–1

=== Results by country ===
As of the 2026 Junior League World Series.

Country	Region Championships	JLWS Championships	W–L	PCT
Taiwan	15	11	70–6	.921
Northern Mariana Islands	6	0	5–16	.238
Philippines	2	0	7–3	.700
Guam	2	0	2–4	.333
Indonesia	1	0	1–3	.250
Total	26	11	85–32	.726

== See also ==
Asia–Pacific Region in other Little League divisions

- Little League — Far East
  - Asia-Pacific & Middle East
  - Japan
- Intermediate League
- Senior League
- Big League
