= Junior League World Series (Central Region) =

Central Region
- Most recent season or competition: 2026 Junior League World Series
- Sport: Baseball
- Founded: 1981
- No. of teams: 13
- Country: United States
- Most recent champion: Whitefish Bay, Wisconsin
- Most titles: Indiana (11)

The Junior League World Series Central Region is one of six United States regions that currently sends teams to the World Series in Taylor, Michigan. The region's participation in the JLWS dates back to 1981.

== Central Region States ==
- Illinois
- Indiana
- Iowa
- Kansas
- Kentucky
- Michigan
- Minnesota
- Missouri
- Nebraska
- North Dakota
- Ohio
- South Dakota
- Wisconsin

== Region Champions ==
As of the 2026 Junior League World Series.

Year	City	JLWS	Record
1981	Boardman, Ohio	Champions	3–0
1982	Libertyville, Illinois	Runner-up	2–2
1983	Madison, Wisconsin	Round 1	0–3
1984	Fort Wayne, Indiana	Round 1	0–3
1985	Chicago, Illinois	Third Place	1–2
1986	Athens County, Ohio	Runner-up	2–2
1987	Madison, Wisconsin	Fourth Place	2–2
1988	Hobart, Indiana	Round 2	1–2
1989	Fort Branch, Indiana	Round 1	0–2
1990	Illinois	Third Place	2–2
1991	Midland, Michigan	Round 1	0–2
1992	Portage, Indiana	Round 1	0–2
1993	Chicago, Illinois	Third Place	3–2
1994	Hamilton, Ohio	Runner-up	3–2
1995	South Point, Ohio	Round 1	0–2
1996	Fort Wayne, Indiana	Third Place	3–2
1997	Ashtabula, Ohio	Round 1	0–2
1998	Fort Wayne, Indiana	Round 1	0–2
1999	Fort Wayne, Indiana	Round 3	1–2
2000	Baxter Springs, Kansas	Fourth Place	2–2
2001	Fort Wayne, Indiana (Host)	Pool stage	1–2
2002	Fort Wayne, Indiana (Host)	Pool stage	0–4
2003	Urbandale, Iowa	Pool stage	0–4
2004	Ankeny, Iowa	Pool stage	2–2
2005	Fort Wayne, Indiana (Host)	Pool stage	0–4
2006	South Bend, Indiana	Pool stage	1–3
2007	Glendale, Wisconsin	Pool stage	1–3
2008	Johnston, Iowa	US Final	3–2
2009	Middlebury, Indiana	US Final	2–3
2010	Jeffersonville, Indiana	Pool stage	2–2
2011	North Canton, Ohio	Pool stage	1–3
2012	North Canton, Ohio	Pool stage	1–3
2013	Bedford, Indiana	Pool stage	2–2
2014	Midland, Michigan	Pool stage	1–3
2015	Johnston, Iowa	US Final	4–1
2016	Midland, Michigan	Round 2	1–2
2017	Saginaw, Michigan	Round 1	0–2
2018	Chicago, Illinois	Round 3	2–2
2019	Johnston, Iowa	Round 1	0–2
2020	Cancelled due to COVID-19 pandemic		
2021	Cancelled due to COVID-19 pandemic		
2022	Whitefish Bay, Wisconsin	Round 1	1–2
2023	Elmhurst, Illinois	Round 2	1–2
2024	Elmhurst, Illinois	Round 1	0–2
2025	Elmhurst, Illinois	Round 1	1–2
2026	Whitefish Bay, Wisconsin	Round 3	2–2

=== Results by State ===
As of the 2026 Junior League World Series.

State	Region Championships	JLWS Championships	Record	PCT
Indiana	11	0	12–25	.324
Illinois	8	0	12–16	.429
Ohio	7	1	10–14	.417
Iowa	5	0	9–11	.450
Wisconsin	5	0	6–12	.333
Michigan	4	0	2–9	.182
(Indiana) Host Team(s)	3	0	1–10	.091
Kansas	1	0	2–2	.500
Total	44	1	54–99	.353

== See also ==
Central Region in other Little League divisions

- Little League – Central 1957-2000
  - Little League – Great Lakes
  - Little League – Midwest
- Intermediate League
- Senior League
- Big League
