= 2003 Junior League World Series =

Tournament information
- Location: Taylor, Michigan
- Dates: August 10–16

Final positions
- Champions: La Mirada, California
- Runner-up: Santiago, Panama

The 2003 Junior League World Series took place from August 10–16 in Taylor, Michigan, United States. La Mirada, California defeated Santiago, Panama in the championship game.

== Teams ==
United States	International
Urbandale, Iowa; Urbandale; Central	(Northern Mariana Islands) Saipan, Northern Mariana Islands; Saipan; Asia-Pacific
Mansfield, Massachusetts; Mansfield; East	Surrey, British Columbia; Whalley; Canada
(Virginia) Bridgewater, Virginia; Bridgewater; Southeast	Moscow, Russia; Khovrino; Europe
(Texas) Sugar Land, Texas; West Sugar Land; Southwest	(Panama) Santiago, Panama; Activo; Latin America
La Mirada, California; La Mirada; West	

== Results ==
United States Pool

Team	W	L	Rs	Ra
Virginia	4	0	17	6
California	3	1	26	5
Texas	2	2	20	22
Massachusetts	1	3	7	24
Iowa	0	4	13	31

	(California)	(Iowa)	(Massachusetts)	(Texas)	(Virginia)
California	–	1–0	10–0	14–0	1–5
Iowa	0–1	–	4–5	5–18	4–7
Massachusetts	0–10	5–4	–	1–2	1–8
Texas	0–14	18–5	2–1	–	0–2
Virginia	5–1	7–4	8–1	2–0	–

International Pool

Team	W	L	Rs	Ra
Canada	3	0	29	8
Panama	2	1	20	10
Russia	1	2	11	17
Northern Mariana Islands	0	3	0	25

	(Canada)	(Northern Mariana Islands)	(Panama)	(Russia)
Canada	–	10–0	10–7	9–1
Northern Mariana Islands	0–10	–	0–5	0–10
Panama	7–10	5–0	–	8–0
Russia	1–9	10–0	0–8	–

Elimination Round

Semifinals
4–0	Virginia	5
3–1	California	8
3–0	Canada	2
2–1	Panama	11

World Championship
4–1	California	8
3–1	Panama	7

2003 Junior League World Series Champions
La Mirada LL
La Mirada, California
