= 1994 Junior League World Series =

Tournament information
- Location: Taylor, Michigan
- Dates: August 15–20

Final positions
- Champions: Thousand Oaks, California
- Runner-up: Hamilton, Ohio

The 1994 Junior League World Series took place from August 15–20 in Taylor, Michigan, United States. Thousand Oaks, California defeated Hamilton, Ohio in the championship game.

== Teams ==
United States	International
(Ohio) Hamilton, Ohio Central	(British Columbia) Surrey, British Columbia Canada
(New York (state)) Vestal, New York East	(Germany) Germany Europe
(Florida) Jacksonville, Florida South	(Tamaulipas) Matamoros, Tamaulipas Mexico
(California) Thousand Oaks, California West	Puerto Rico Puerto Rico

== Results ==
Upper round 1	Upper round 2	Upper final	World Championship
—	California	3
—	Puerto Rico	0
1–0	California	10
1–0	Florida	3
—	(New York (state)) New York	2
—	Florida	4
2–0	California	5
2–0	Ohio	2
—	Germany	2
—	Canada	15
1–0	Canada	4
1–0	Ohio	5
—	Mexico	0
—	Ohio	14	3–0	California	20	—
3–1	Ohio	3	—
Lower round 1	Lower round 2	Lower round 3	Lower final
1–1	Canada	6
0–1	Puerto Rico	3	1–1	(New York (state)) New York (F/11)	7	2–1	Ohio	9
0–1	(New York (state)) New York	5	2–1	(New York (state)) New York	6	3–1	(New York (state)) New York	6
2–1	Mexico	2
1–1	Florida	3
0–1	Germany	3	1–1	Mexico (F/8)	7
0–1	Mexico (F/10)	4

1994 Junior League World Series Champions
Thousand Oaks, California
