= Junior League World Series =

Recurring baseball tournament for children ages 12-14 help in Taylor, Michigan

- Most recent season or competition: 2026 Junior League World Series
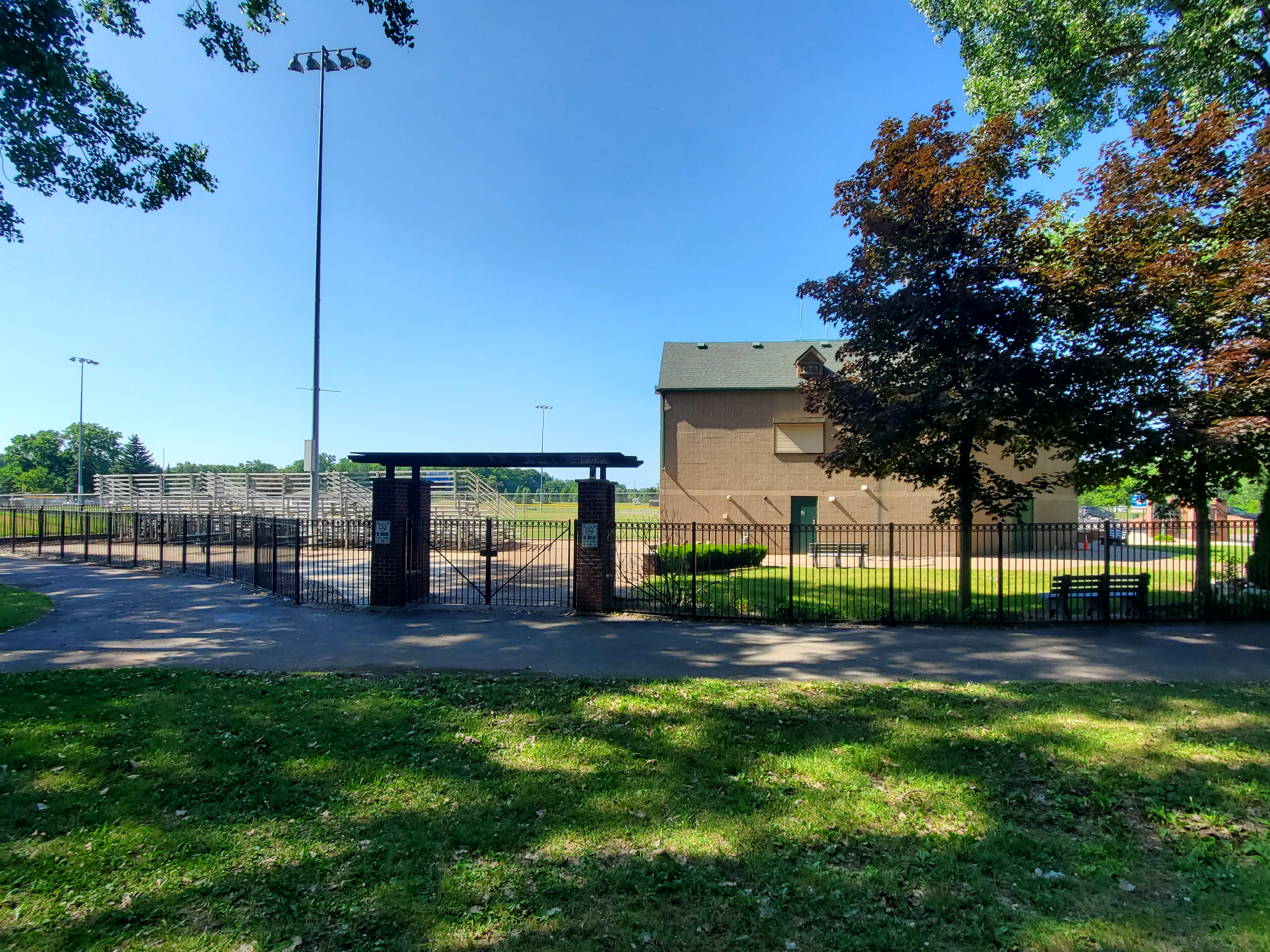
- The field at Heritage Park in Taylor, Michigan
- Sport: Baseball
- Founded: 1981
- No. of teams: 12
- Country: International
- Venue: Heritage Park
- Most recent champion: La Mirada, California
- Most titles: Taiwan (11)
- Website: LittleLeague.org

The Junior League World Series is a baseball tournament for children aged 12, 13, and 14 years old. The tournament is held annually at Heritage Park in Taylor, Michigan. It is patterned after the Little League World Series, which was named for the World Series in Major League Baseball.

The Junior League World Series is one of eleven tournaments sponsored by Little League International. Each of them brings baseball or softball teams from around the world together in one of four age divisions. The tournament structure for each division's World Series is similar to that used for the Little League Baseball World Series.

== Tournament history ==
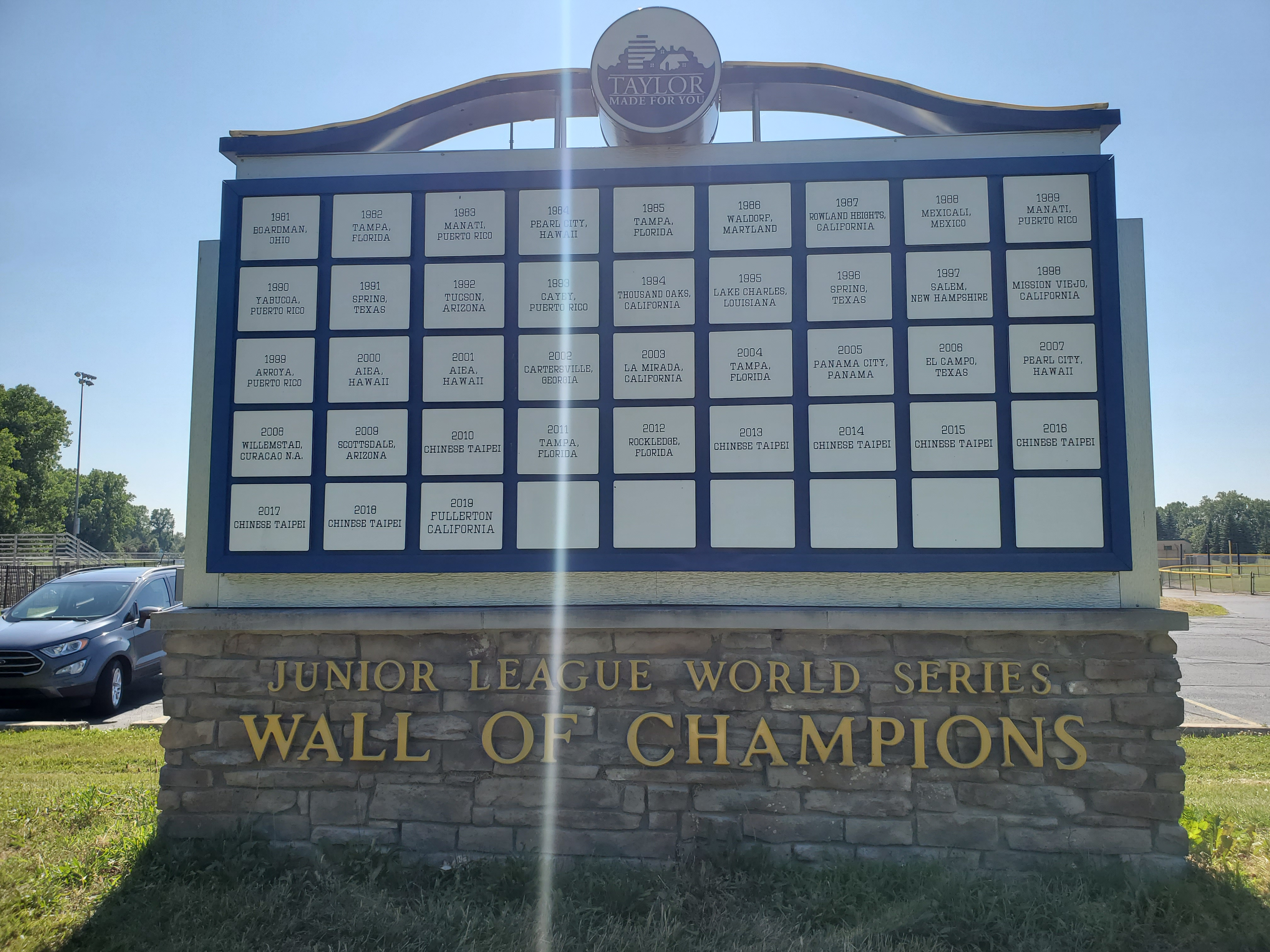
Junior League World Series Wall of Champions at the field in Heritage Park

The tournament started in 1981, and was originally created for 13-year-old players competing in Little League's Senior League division (which at the time included 13- to 15-year-olds). In 1999, Little league spun a separate Junior League division off from the Senior League division, which included 13- and 14-year-old players (currently, 15-year-olds are also eligible if their date of birth is after May 1 of the current season). Unlike the Little League World Series — which has sixteen regions (eight in the U.S. and eight international) — the Junior League World Series has only twelve regions. The twelve regional champions are divided into two pools (USA and International). The two best teams from each pool advance to the semi-finals, to determine the US champion and the International champion. The semi-final winners play for the World Series Championship. The losing teams face off in classification games.

Originally only US teams played in the tournament. As time progressed, however, international teams began to participate. The Puerto Rico Region was established as the first international region, in 1982. The Mexico Region followed in 1986, the Canada Region in 1988, the first European team in 1990, and the Australia Region in 2016. Prior to 2000, the Mexico and Puerto Rico regions each received automatic berths into the tournament. In 2000, a Latin America Region was formed and included the former Mexico and Puerto Rico regions. Starting in 2004, the Mexico Region now receives an automatic berth to the tournament in even-numbered years, while the Puerto Rico Region receives an automatic berth in odd-numbered years. (Each year, the teams from the region without an automatic berth instead participate in the Latin America Region tournament.) From 1985–89 the Michigan state champion received a slot as the Host Team. In 2018, the Host Team was brought back to the tournament as the sixth United States region.

The six United States regions are:

- Central
- East
- Host
- Southeast
- Southwest
- West

The six International regions are:

- Asia–Pacific
- Australia
- Canada
- Europe–Africa
- Latin America
- Mexico or Puerto Rico

== List of champions ==
Year	Winner	Region	Score	Runner–Up	Region
1981	Boardman, Ohio	Central	4–0	Richmond, Virginia	South
1982	Tampa, Florida	South	6–1	Libertyville, Illinois	Central
1983	Manatí, Puerto Rico	Puerto Rico	3–0	Altamonte Springs, Florida	South
1984	Pearl City, Hawaii	West	7–5	Yabucoa, Puerto Rico	Puerto Rico
1985	Tampa, Florida	South	10–3	Salisbury, Maryland	East
1986	Waldorf, Maryland	East	4–3	Athens County, Ohio	Central
1987	Rowland Heights, Southern California	West	16–4 & 14–3	(New York (state)) Wappinger, New York	East
1988	Mexicali, Mexico	Mexico	11–6	Hilo, Hawaii	West
1989	Manatí, Puerto Rico	Puerto Rico	2–9 & 9–2	(Georgia (U.S. state)) Toccoa, Georgia	South
1990	Yabucoa, Puerto Rico	Puerto Rico	6–4	San Antonio, Texas	South
1991	Spring, Texas	South	2–7 & 7–1	Henderson, Nevada	West
1992	Tucson, Arizona	West	8–1 & 5–4	Lake Charles, Louisiana	South
1993	Cayey, Puerto Rico	Puerto Rico	9–1	Reynosa, Mexico	Mexico
1994	Thousand Oaks, Southern California	West	20–3	Hamilton, Ohio	Central
1995	Lake Charles, Louisiana	South	3–4 & 8–2	Northridge, Southern California	West
1996	Spring, Texas	South	7–5	Aiea, Hawaii	West
1997	Salem, New Hampshire	East	4–1	Mission Viejo, Southern California	West
1998	Mission Viejo, Southern California	West	6–2 & 9–6	Waco, Texas	South
1999	Arroyo, Puerto Rico	Puerto Rico	1–0	Hermosillo, Mexico	Mexico
2000	Aiea, Hawaii	West	2–1	Langley, Canada	Canada
2001	Aiea, Hawaii	West	6–5	San Francisco, Venezuela	Latin America
2002	(Georgia (U.S. state)) Cartersville, Georgia	South	3–2	David, Panama	Latin America
2003	La Mirada, Southern California	West	8–7	Santiago, Panama	Latin America
2004	Tampa, Florida	South	5–2	Punto Fijo, Venezuela	Latin America
2005	Panama City, Panama	Latin America	3–0	Tarpon Springs, Florida	South
2006	El Campo, East Texas	Southwest	2–1	Guaymas, Mexico	Mexico
2007	Pearl City, Hawaii	West	6–2	Makati, Philippines	Asia–Pacific
2008	Willemstad, Curaçao	Latin America	5–2	Hilo, Hawaii	West
2009	Scottsdale, Arizona	West	9–1	Oranjestad, Aruba	Latin America
2010	Taipei, Taiwan	Asia–Pacific	9–1	Tyler, East Texas	Southwest
2011	Tampa, Florida	Southeast	2–1	Taoyuan, Taiwan	Asia–Pacific
2012	Rockledge, Florida	Southeast	12–10	Oranjestad, Aruba	Latin America
2013	Taoyuan, Taiwan	Asia–Pacific	11–2	Rio Rico, Arizona	West
2014	Taichung, Taiwan	Asia–Pacific	9–1	Corpus Christi, West Texas	Southwest
2015	Taichung, Taiwan	Asia–Pacific	12–0	Stephens City, Virginia	Southeast
2016	Taoyuan, Taiwan	Asia–Pacific	9–1	Kapaa, Hawaii	West
2017	Taoyuan, Taiwan	Asia–Pacific	12–1^{(F/5)}	Kennett Square, Pennsylvania	East
2018	Taoyuan, Taiwan	Asia–Pacific	2–0	Lufkin, East Texas	Southwest
2019	Fullerton, Southern California	West	8–3	Guayama, Puerto Rico	Puerto Rico
2020	Cancelled due to COVID-19 pandemic				
2021	Cancelled due to COVID-19 pandemic				
2022	Taichung, Taiwan	Asia–Pacific	7–1	Corpus Christi, West Texas	Southwest
2023	Taoyuan, Taiwan	Asia–Pacific	6–0	Taylor, Michigan	Host
2024	Taoyuan, Taiwan	Asia–Pacific	5–0	Taylor, Michigan	Host
2025	Taichung, Taiwan	Asia–Pacific	8–1	(Georgia (U.S. state)) Macon, Georgia	Southeast
2026	La Mirada, Southern California	West	6–3 ^{(F/10)}	Taoyuan, Taiwan	Asia–Pacific
Year	Winner	Region	Score	Runner–Up	Region

=== Championships won by country/state ===
Team	Championships	Last
Taiwan	11	2025
Southern California	6	2026
Puerto Rico	5	1999
Florida	5	2012
Hawaii	4	2007
Texas	3	2006
Arizona	2	2009
Ohio	1	1981
Maryland	1	1986
Mexico	1	1988
Louisiana	1	1995
New Hampshire	1	1997
(Georgia (U.S. state)) Georgia	1	2002
Panama	1	2005
Curaçao	1	2008

== See also ==
- List of Little League World Series champions by division
