= 1981 Junior League World Series =

Tournament information
- Location: Taylor, Michigan
- Dates: August 18–21

Final positions
- Champions: Boardman, Ohio
- Runner-up: Richmond, Virginia

The 1981 Junior League World Series (then known as the "Senior Little League World Series for 13-year-olds") took place from August 18–21 in Taylor, Michigan, United States. Boardman, Ohio defeated Richmond, Virginia in the championship game.

This was the inaugural JLWS.

== Teams ==
United States
(Ohio) Boardman, Ohio

Central
(New Jersey) Washington Township, New Jersey

East
(Virginia) Richmond, Virginia

South
(California) Bassett, California

West

== Results ==
First Round
—	Virginia	5
—	New Jersey	3
—	Ohio	6
—	California	2
Lower round 1
0–1	New Jersey	0
0–1	California	4

Semifinals
1–0	Virginia	1
1–0	Ohio	6
Lower final
1–1	Virginia
1–1	California

World Championship
2–0	Ohio	4	—
2–1	Virginia	0	—

1981 Junior League World Series Champions
Boardman, Ohio
