= Junior League World Series (Europe–Africa Region) =

Europe–Africa Region
- Most recent season or competition: 2026 Junior League World Series
- Sport: Baseball
- Founded: 1990
- Most recent champion: Bologna, Italy
- Most titles: Germany (10)

The Junior League World Series Europe–Africa Region is one of six International regions that currently sends teams to the World Series in Taylor, Michigan. The region's participation in the JLWS dates back to 1990.

== Europe–Africa Region Countries ==
- Austria
- Belarus
- Croatia
- Czech Republic
- Germany
- Germany (USA)
- Hungary
- Italy
- Lithuania
- Netherlands
- Poland
- Uganda
- United Kingdom

== Region Champions ==
As of the 2026 Junior League World Series.

Year	City	JLWS	Record
1990	Kaiserslautern, West Germany	Round 2	1–2
1991	Germany	Round 1	0–2
1992	Brussels, Belgium	Round 1	0–2
1993	Germany	Round 1	0–2
1994	Germany	Round 1	0–2
1995	Dhahran, Saudi Arabia	Round 1	0–2
1996	Ramstein, Germany	Round 1	0–2
1997	Svoboda nad Úpou, Czech Republic	Round 1	0–2
1998	Ramstein, Germany	Round 1	0–2
1999	Ramstein, Germany	Round 2	0–2
2000	Ramstein, Germany	Round 1	0–2
2001	Kutno, Poland	Pool stage	0–3
2002	Kutno, Poland	Int'l Final	2–2
2003	Moscow, Russia	Pool stage	1–2
2004	Mons, Belgium	Pool stage	1–3
2005	Rotterdam, Netherlands	Pool stage	0–4
2006	Ramstein, Germany	Pool stage	1–3
2007	Kirovohrad, Ukraine	Pool stage	0–4
2008	London, England	Pool stage	0–4
2009	Friuli, Italy	Pool stage	1–3
2010	Kirovohrad, Ukraine	Pool stage	1–3
2011	Emilia, Italy	Pool stage	1–3
2012	Lazio, Italy	Pool stage	1–3
2013	Brno, Czech Republic	Pool stage	1–3
2014	Brno, Czech Republic	Pool stage	0–4
2015	Brno, Czech Republic	Pool stage	1–3
2016	Brno, Czech Republic	Round 1	0–2
2017	Brno, Czech Republic	Round 2	1–2
2018	Bologna, Italy	Round 2	1–2
2019	Bologna, Italy	Round 1	0–2
2020	Cancelled due to COVID-19 pandemic		
2021	Cancelled due to COVID-19 pandemic		
2022	Brno, Czech Republic	Int'l Final	3–2
2023	Brno, Czech Republic	Round 1	1–2
2024	Barcelona, Spain	Round 1	0–2
2025	Mannheim, Germany	Round 3	2–2
2026	Bologna, Italy	Round 2	2–2

=== Results by Country ===
As of the 2026 Junior League World Series.

Country	Region Championships	JLWS Championships	Record	PCT
Germany	10	0	4–21	.160
Czech Republic	8	0	7–20	.259
Italy	6	0	6–15	.286
Poland	2	0	2–5	.286
Belgium	2	0	1–5	.167
Ukraine	2	0	1–7	.125
Saudi Arabia	1	0	0–2	.000
Russia	1	0	1–2	.333
Spain	1	0	0–2	.000
Netherlands	1	0	0–4	.000
England	1	0	0–4	.000
Total	35	0	22–87	.202

== See also ==
Europe–Africa Region in other Little League divisions

- Little League
- Intermediate League
- Senior League
- Big League
