= 2015 Junior League World Series =

International children's baseball competition

Tournament information
- Location: Taylor, Michigan
- Dates: August 16–23

Final positions
- Champions: Taichung, Taiwan
- Runner-up: Stephens City, Virginia

The 2015 Junior League World Series took place from August 16–23 in Taylor, Michigan, United States. Taichung, Taiwan defeated Stephens City, Virginia in the championship game. In addition to being the second straight championship for Chung Shan LL; Taiwan became the first County/State to win three straight JLWS championships.

== Teams ==
United States	International
Johnston, Iowa; Johnston; Central	Taichung, Taiwan; Chung Shan; Asia–Pacific
Ridgewood, New Jersey; Ridgewood; East	Oakville, Ontario; Oakville; Canada
Stephens City, Virginia; Frederick County National / Stephens City; Southeast	Brno, Czech Republic; South Moravia; Europe–Africa
Weslaco, Texas; Weslaco; Southwest	Aguadulce, Panama; Aguadulce Cabezera; Latin America
Pearl City, Hawaii; Pearl City; West	Caguas, Puerto Rico; Villa Blanca; Puerto Rico

== Results ==
United States Pool

Team	W	L	Rs	Ra
Iowa	4	0	30	14
Virginia	2	2	17	16
New Jersey	2	2	24	20
Hawaii	2	2	14	20
Texas	0	4	7	21

	(Hawaii)	(Iowa)	(New Jersey)	(Texas)	(Virginia)
Hawaii	–	1–2	9–7	4–1	0–10
Iowa	2–1	–	10–5	9–5^{(8)}	9–4
New Jersey	7–9	5–10	–	6–0	6–1
Texas	1–4	5–9^{(8)}	0–6	–	1–2
Virginia	10–0	4–9	1–6	2–1	–

International Pool

Team	W	L	Rs	Ra
Taiwan	4	0	45	7
Puerto Rico	3	1	33	23
Panama	2	2	24	21
Czech Republic	1	3	16	34
Canada	0	4	12	45

	(Canada)	(Czech Republic)	(Panama)	(Puerto Rico)	(Taiwan)
Canada	–	6–11	3–13	3–11	0–10
Czech Republic	11–6	–	2–4	3–10	0–14
Panama	13–3	4–2	–	5–7	2–9
Puerto Rico	11–3	10–3	7–5	–	5–12
Taiwan	10–0	14–0	9–2	12–5	–

Elimination Round

Semifinals
4–0	Iowa	4
2–2	Virginia	7
4–0	Taiwan	6
3–1	Puerto Rico	0

World Championship
3–2	Virginia	0
5–0	Taiwan	12

2015 Junior League World Series Champions
Chung Shan LL
Taichung, Taiwan

== Notable players ==
- Gu Lin Ruei-yang of the Taichung team later played in the Chinese Professional Baseball League and Nippon Professional Baseball. Second appearance in the tournament.
