= 2002 Junior League World Series =

Tournament information
- Location: Taylor, Michigan
- Dates: August 11–17

Final positions
- Champions: (Georgia (U.S. state)) Cartersville, Georgia
- Runner-up: David, Panama

The 2002 Junior League World Series took place from August 11–17 in Taylor, Michigan, United States. Cartersville, Georgia, USA defeated David, Panama in the championship game.

== Teams ==
United States	International
Fort Wayne, Indiana; Hamilton Park; Central	(Northern Mariana Islands) Saipan, Northern Mariana Islands; Saipan; Asia-Pacific
DuBois, Pennsylvania; DuBois; East	Langley, British Columbia; North Langley; Canada
(Georgia (U.S. state)) Cartersville, Georgia; Cartersville; Southeast	(Poland) Kutno, Poland; Kutno West; Europe
(Louisiana) Lake Charles, Louisiana; South Lake Charles; Southwest	David, Panama; Panama City; Latin America
Yucaipa, California; Yucaipa American; West	

== Results ==
United States Pool

Team	W	L	Rs	Ra
(Georgia (U.S. state)) Georgia	4	0	26	8
California	3	1	28	14
Pennsylvania	2	2	23	15
Louisiana	1	3	25	24
Indiana	0	4	9	41

	(California)	(Georgia (U.S. state))	(Indiana)	(Louisiana)	(Pennsylvania)
California	–	2–8	11–1	6–5	9–0
Georgia (Georgia (U.S. state))	8–2	–	8–2	6–1	4–3^{(10)}
Indiana	1–11	2–8	–	2–12	4–10
Louisiana	5–6	1–6	12–2	–	7–10
Pennsylvania	0–9	3–4^{(10)}	10–4	10–7	–

International Pool

Team	W	L	Rs	Ra
Panama	3	0	23	1
Poland	2	1	16	14
Canada	1	2	7	24
Northern Mariana Islands	0	3	7	14

	(Canada)	(Northern Mariana Islands)	(Panama)	(Poland)
Canada	–	7–6	0–7	0–11
Northern Mariana Islands	6–7	–	1–2	0–5
Panama	7–0	2–1	–	14–0
Poland	11–0	5–0	0–14	–

Elimination Round

Semifinals
4–0	(Georgia (U.S. state)) Georgia	19
3–1	California	12
3–0	Panama	8
2–1	Poland	1

World Championship
5–0	(Georgia (U.S. state)) Georgia	3
4–0	Panama	2

2002 Junior League World Series Champions
Cartersville LL
Cartersville, Georgia
