= 2017 Junior League World Series =

International children's baseball competition

Tournament information
- Location: Taylor, Michigan
- Dates: August 13–20

Final positions
- Champions: Taoyuan, Taiwan
- Runner-up: Kennett Square, Pennsylvania

The 2017 Junior League World Series took place from August 13–20 in Taylor, Michigan, United States. Taoyuan, Taiwan defeated Kennett Square, Pennsylvania in the championship game. It was Taiwan's fifth straight championship.

== Teams ==
United States	International
(Michigan) Saginaw, Michigan; North Saginaw Township; Central	(Taiwan) Taoyuan, Taiwan; Hsin Ming; Asia–Pacific
(Pennsylvania) Kennett Square, Pennsylvania; Kennett Square KAU; East	(New South Wales) Sydney, New South Wales; Hills; Australia
(North Carolina) Rutherfordton, North Carolina; Rutherfordton; Southeast	(Alberta) Lethbridge, Alberta; Lethbridge Southwest; Canada
(Texas) Abilene, Texas; Wylie; Southwest	(Czech Republic) Brno, Czech Republic; South Czech Republic; Europe–Africa
(California) Encinitas, California; Encinitas; West	(Venezuela) Maracaibo, Venezuela; San Francisco; Latin America
	Yabucoa, Puerto Rico; Juan Antonio Bibiloni; Puerto Rico

== Results ==
United States Bracket

—
—	Texas	12
—	California	8
Lower round 1
0–1	California	5
0–1	Michigan	4

—
1–0	Texas	4
—	Pennsylvania	13
—	Michigan	1
—	North Carolina	4
Lower round 2
1–1	Texas	3
1–1	California	11

—
1–0	Pennsylvania	5
1–0	North Carolina	2
Lower final
1–1	North Carolina	5
2–1	California	3

United States Championship
2–0	Pennsylvania (F/5)	15
2–1	North Carolina	2

International Bracket

—
—	Taiwan (F/5)	11
—	Australia	0
—	Puerto Rico (F/6)	11
—	Canada	1
Lower round 1
0–1	Australia	4
1–1	Puerto Rico	0
0–1	Czech Republic	10
0–1	Canada	9

—
1–0	Taiwan (F/6)	15
—	Czech Republic	0
1–0	Puerto Rico	0
—	Venezuela	4
Lower round 2
1–1	Australia	10
1–1	Czech Republic	6

—
2–0	Taiwan	9
1–0	Venezuela	2
Lower final
1–1	Venezuela	9
2–1	Australia	0

International Championship
3–0	Taiwan (F/8)	4
2–1	Venezuela	3

Elimination Round

Semifinals
2–0	Pennsylvania (F/5)	15
2–1	North Carolina	2
3–0	Taiwan (F/8)	4
2–1	Venezuela	3

World Championship
3–0	Pennsylvania	1
4–0	Taiwan (F/5)	12

2017 Junior League World Series Champions
Hsin Ming LL
Taoyuan, Taiwan
