= 1983 Junior League World Series =

Tournament information
- Location: Taylor, Michigan
- Dates: August 16–20

Final positions
- Champions: Manatí, Puerto Rico
- Runner-up: Altamonte Springs, Florida

The 1983 Junior League World Series took place from August 16–20 in Taylor, Michigan, United States. Manatí, Puerto Rico defeated Altamonte Springs, Florida in the championship game.

== Teams ==
United States	International
(Wisconsin) Madison, Wisconsin; West Madison; Central	Manatí, Puerto Rico Puerto Rico
(Delaware) Seaford, Delaware East	
(Florida) Altamonte Springs, Florida South
(California) Northridge, California West

== Results ==
Opening Game
—	Florida	23
—	Wisconsin	7
Lower round 1
0–1	Wisconsin	3
0–1	California	19

First round
1–0	Florida	4
—	Delaware	1
—	California	13
—	Puerto Rico	16
Lower round 2
0–1	Delaware	1
1–1	California	19

Semifinals
2–0	Florida	11
1–0	Puerto Rico	12
Lower final
2–1	Florida	6
2–1	California	3

World championship
2–0	Puerto Rico	3
3–1	Florida	0

Consolation round

—			Third-place game
			2–2	California	9
0–2	Wisconsin	5	1–2	Delaware	6
0–2	Delaware	16

1983 Junior League World Series Champions
Manatí, Puerto Rico
