= 2016 Junior League World Series =

International children's baseball competition

Tournament information
- Location: Taylor, Michigan
- Dates: August 14–21, 2016

Final positions
- Champions: Taoyuan, Taiwan
- Runner-up: Kapaa, Hawaii

The 2016 Junior League World Series took place August 14–21, 2016 in Taylor, Michigan, United States. Taoyuan, Taiwan defeated Kapaa, Hawaii in the championship game. It was Taiwan's the fourth straight championship.

Due to the addition of the Australia region; a modified–double–elimination format was introduced.

== Teams ==
United States	International
Midland, Michigan; Northeast/Fraternal Northwest; Central	Taoyuan, Taiwan; Hsin Ming; Asia–Pacific
Salisbury, Maryland; West Salisbury; East	Sydney, New South Wales; Cronulla; Australia
Taylors, South Carolina; Northwood; Southeast	Lethbridge, Alberta; Lethbridge Southwest; Canada
Corpus Christi, Texas; Padre; Southwest	Brno, Czech Republic; South Czech Republic; Europe–Africa
Kapaa, Hawaii; Kawaihau Community; West	Juan Díaz, Panama; Tomas Munoz; Latin America
	Guadalupe, Nuevo León; Guadalupe Linda Vista; Mexico

== Results ==
United States Bracket

—
–	South Carolina	8
–	Michigan	2
Lower round 1
0–1	Michigan (F/5)	12
0–1	Maryland	2

—
1–0	South Carolina	4
–	Texas	0
–	Maryland	1
–	Hawaii	4
Lower round 2
0–1	Texas	2
1–1	Michigan	1

—
2–0	South Carolina	7
1–0	Hawaii (F/8)	12
Lower final
2–1	South Carolina	2
1–1	Texas	5

United States Championship
2–0	Hawaii	4
2–1	Texas	3

International Bracket

—
–	Taiwan	5
–	Australia	1
–	Mexico	2
–	Canada	0
Lower round 1
0–1	Czech Republic	5
0–1	Canada	7
0–1	Panama (F/5)	14
0–1	Australia	3

—
1–0	Taiwan (F/5)	12
–	Czech Republic	0
1–0	Mexico (F/9)	2
–	Panama	1
Lower round 2
1–1	Canada	5
1–1	Panama	7

—
2–0	Taiwan (F/5)	11
2–0	Mexico	0
Lower final
2–1	Mexico	4
2–1	Panama	3

International Championship
3–0	Taiwan	6
3–1	Mexico	2

Elimination Round

Semifinals
2–0	Hawaii	4
2–1	Texas	3
3–0	Taiwan	6
3–1	Mexico	2

World Championship
3–0	Hawaii	1
4–0	Taiwan	9

2016 Junior League World Series Champions
Hsin Ming LL
Taoyuan, Taiwan
