= 2011 Junior League World Series =

Tournament information
- Location: Taylor, Michigan
- Dates: August 14–20

Final positions
- Champions: Tampa, Florida
- Runner-up: Taoyuan, Taiwan

The 2011 Junior League World Series took place from August 14–20 in Taylor, Michigan, United States. Tampa, Florida defeated Taoyuan, Taiwan in the championship game.

== Teams ==
United States	International
North Canton, Ohio; North Canton; Central	Taoyuan, Taiwan; Hsin Ming; Asia–Pacific
Johnston, Rhode Island; Johnston; East	Surrey, British Columbia; Whalley; Canada
Tampa, Florida; Palma Ceia; Southeast	Emilia, Italy; Emilia; EMEA
Rosenberg, Texas; Rosenberg National; Southwest	Maracaibo, Venezuela; Coquivacoa; Latin America
Tucson, Arizona; Sunnyside; West	Yabucoa, Puerto Rico; Juan A Bibiloni; Puerto Rico

== Results ==
United States Pool

Team	W	L	Rs	Ra
Florida	4	0	35	16
Arizona	3	1	22	14
Rhode Island	2	2	13	25
Ohio	1	3	11	16
Texas	0	4	11	22

	(Arizona)	(Florida)	(Ohio)	(Rhode Island)	(Texas)
Arizona	–	6–9	3–0	9–2	4–2
Florida	9–6	–	5–2	13–3	8–5
Ohio	0–3	2–5	–	2–5	7–3
Rhode Island	2–9	3–13	5–2	–	3–1
Texas	2–4	5–8	3–7	1–3	–

International Pool

Team	W	L	Rs	Ra
Taiwan	4	0	33	7
Venezuela	3	1	26	8
Canada	1	3	8	25
Puerto Rico	1	3	16	17
Italy	1	3	4	30

	(Canada)	(Italy)	(Puerto Rico)	(Taiwan)	(Venezuela)
Canada	–	2–4	6–1	0–10	0–10
Italy	4–2	–	0–6	0–11	0–11
Puerto Rico	1–6	6–0	–	6–7	3–4
Taiwan	10–0	11–0	7–6	–	5–1^{(14)}
Venezuela	10–0	11–0	4–3	1–5^{(14)}	–

Elimination Round

Semifinals
4–0	Florida	4
3–1	Arizona	0
4–0	Taiwan (F/10)	3
3–1	Venezuela	2

World Championship
5–0	Florida	2
5–0	Taiwan	1

2011 Junior League World Series Champions
Palma Ceia LL
Tampa, Florida
