= 2012 Junior League World Series =

Tournament information
- Location: Taylor, Michigan
- Dates: August 12–18

Final positions
- Champions: Rockledge, Florida
- Runner-up: Oranjestad, Aruba

The 2012 Junior League World Series took place from August 12–18 in Taylor, Michigan, United States. Rockledge, Florida defeated Oranjestad, Aruba in the championship game. It was Florida's second straight championship.

== Teams ==
| United States | International |
|---|---|
| North Canton, Ohio; North Canton; Central | Tainan, Taiwan; Min De; Asia–Pacific |
| (New York (state)) Franklin Square, New York; Franklin Square; East | Calgary, Alberta; Centennial; Canada |
| Rockledge, Florida; Rockledge; Southeast | Lazio, Italy; Lazio; EMEA |
| Corpus Christi, Texas; Oil Belt; Southwest | Oranjestad, Aruba; Aruba North; Latin America |
| Manhattan Beach, California; Manhattan; West | San Nicolás, Nuevo León; Las Puentes; Mexico |

== Results ==
United States Pool

| Team | W | L | Rs | Ra |
|---|---|---|---|---|
| Florida | 4 | 0 | 38 | 33 |
| Texas | 3 | 1 | 48 | 18 |
| California | 1 | 3 | 19 | 34 |
| Ohio | 1 | 3 | 25 | 35 |
| (New York (state)) New York | 1 | 3 | 21 | 35 |

| | (California) | (Florida) | (New York (state)) | (Ohio) | (Texas) |
|---|---|---|---|---|---|
| California | – | 7–8 | 2–3 | 8–3 | 2–16 |
| Florida | 8–7 | – | 11–10 | 7–6 | 12–10 |
| New York (New York (state)) | 3–2 | 10–11 | – | 8–12 | 0–10 |
| Ohio | 3–8 | 6–7 | 12–8 | – | 4–12 |
| Texas | 16–2 | 10–12 | 10–0 | 12–4 | – |

International Pool

| Team | W | L | Rs | Ra |
|---|---|---|---|---|
| Mexico | 4 | 0 | 40 | 10 |
| Aruba | 3 | 1 | 32 | 15 |
| Taiwan | 2 | 2 | 33 | 10 |
| Italy | 1 | 3 | 19 | 45 |
| Canada | 0 | 4 | 7 | 51 |

| | (Aruba) | (Canada) | (Italy) | (Mexico) | (Taiwan) |
|---|---|---|---|---|---|
| Aruba | – | 12–6 | 13–1 | 5–7 | 2–1 |
| Canada | 6–12 | – | 1–14 | 0–15 | 0–10 |
| Italy | 1–13 | 14–1 | – | 1–13 | 3–18 |
| Mexico | 7–5 | 15–0 | 13–1 | – | 5–4 |
| Taiwan | 1–2 | 10–0 | 18–3 | 4–5 | – |

Elimination Round

Semifinals
4–0 | Florida | 11
3–1 | Texas | 5
4–0 | Mexico | 2
3–1 | Aruba | 5

World Championship
5–0 | Florida | 12
4–1 | Aruba | 10

2012 Junior League World Series Champions
Rockledge LL
Rockledge, Florida
