= 2001 Junior League World Series =

Tournament information
- Location: Taylor, Michigan
- Dates: August 13–18

Final positions
- Champions: Aiea, Hawaii
- Runner-up: San Francisco, Venezuela

The 2001 Junior League World Series took place from August 13–18 in Taylor, Michigan, United States. Aiea, Hawaii, USA defeated San Francisco, Venezuela in the championship game. In addition to being Hawaii's second straight title. Aiea became the first league to win consecutive Junior League World Series.

== Teams ==
United States	International
Fort Wayne, Indiana; St. Joe Central; Central	Surrey, British Columbia; Whalley; Canada
(New York (state)) The Bronx, New York; Rolando Paulino; East	(Poland) Kutno, Poland; Kutno; Europe
(Louisiana) Lake Charles, Louisiana; South Lake Charles; South	(Northern Mariana Islands) Saipan, Northern Mariana Islands; Saipan; Far East
(Hawaii) Aiea, Hawaii; Aiea; West	(Venezuela) San Francisco, Venezuela; San Francisco; Latin America

== Results ==
United States Pool

Team	W	L	Rs	Ra
Louisiana	2	1	16	11
Hawaii	2	1	10	9
(New York (state)) New York	1	2	7	11
Indiana	1	2	10	12

	(Hawaii)	(Indiana)	(Louisiana)	(New York (state))
Hawaii	–	4–1	3–7	3–1
Indiana	1–4	–	6–4	3–4
Louisiana	7–3	4–6	–	5–2
New York (New York (state))	1–3	4–3	2–5	–

International Pool

Team	W	L	Rs	Ra
Venezuela	3	0	23	1
Canada	2	1	21	7
Northern Mariana Islands	1	2	15	23
Poland	0	3	4	32

	(Canada)	(Northern Mariana Islands)	(Poland)	(Venezuela)
Canada	–	12–3	9–0	0–4
Northern Mariana Islands	3–12	–	11–4	1–7
Poland	0–9	4–11	–	0–12
Venezuela	4–0	7–1	12–0	–

Elimination Round

Semifinals
2–1	Louisiana	1
2–1	Hawaii	7
3–0	Venezuela	4
2–1	Canada	2

World Championship
3–1	Hawaii	6
4–0	Venezuela	5

2001 Junior League World Series Champions
Aiea LL
Aiea, Hawaii
