= Junior League World Series (East Region) =

East Region
- Most recent season or competition: 2026 Junior League World Series
- Sport: Baseball
- Founded: 1981
- No. of teams: 12
- Country: United States
- Most recent champion: Freehold Township, New Jersey
- Most titles: New Jersey (11)

The Junior League World Series East Region is one of six United States regions that currently sends teams to the World Series in Taylor, Michigan. The region's participation in the JLWS dates back to 1981.

== East Region States ==
- Connecticut
- Delaware
- Maine
- Maryland
- Massachusetts
- New Hampshire
- New Jersey
- New York
- Pennsylvania
- Rhode Island
- Vermont
- Washington, D.C.

== Region Champions ==
As of the 2026 Junior League World Series.

Year	City	JLWS	Record
1981	Washington Township, New Jersey	Fourth Place	0–2
1982	Seaford, Delaware	Round 1	0–2
1983	Seaford, Delaware	Fourth Place	1–3
1984	Wilmington, Delaware	Third Place	3–2
1985	Salisbury, Maryland	Runner-up	3–2
1986	Waldorf, Maryland	Champions	4–0
1987	(New York (state)) Wappinger, New York	Runner-up	2–2
1988	Philadelphia, Pennsylvania	Round 2	1–2
1989	Willow Grove, Pennsylvania	Round 2	1–2
1990	New Jersey	Round 2	1–2
1991	Pennsylvania	Third Place	3–2
1992	Ringwood, New Jersey	Fourth Place	2–2
1993	Maryland	Round 2	1–2
1994	(New York (state)) Vestal, New York	Third Place	3–2
1995	Millburn, New Jersey	Round 2	1–2
1996	Toms River, New Jersey	Round 1	0–2
1997	Salem, New Hampshire	Champions	4–0
1998	Meriden, Connecticut	Round 2	1–2
1999	Meriden, Connecticut	Round 2	1–2
2000	South Vineland, New Jersey	Round 2	1–2
2001	(New York (state)) The Bronx, New York	Pool stage	1–2
2002	DuBois, Pennsylvania	Pool stage	2–2
2003	Mansfield, Massachusetts	Pool stage	1–3
2004	(New York (state)) Massapequa Park, New York	Pool stage	0–4
2005	Freehold Township, New Jersey (Host)	Pool stage	2–2
2006	Cumberland, New Jersey	Pool stage	2–2
2007	Middletown, New Jersey (Host)	Pool stage	2–2
2008	Canton, Massachusetts	Pool stage	1–3
2009	Jackson, New Jersey	Pool stage	2–2
2010	Freehold Township, New Jersey (Host)	Pool stage	1–3
2011	Johnston, Rhode Island	Pool stage	2–2
2012	(New York (state)) Franklin Square, New York	Pool stage	1–3
2013	(New York (state)) Massapequa Park, New York	Pool stage	0–4
2014	Newark, Delaware	Pool stage	1–3
2015	Ridgewood, New Jersey	Pool stage	2–2
2016	Salisbury, Maryland	Round 1	0–2
2017	Kennett Square, Pennsylvania	Runner-up	3–1
2018	Johnsonburg/Kane/Ridgway, Pennsylvania	Round 2	1–2
2019	Berlin, Maryland	Round 2	1–2
2020	Cancelled due to COVID-19 pandemic		
2021	Cancelled due to COVID-19 pandemic		
2022	Clinton County, Pennsylvania	US Final	2–2
2023	Hillsdale, New Jersey	Round 3	2–2
2024	DuBois, Pennsylvania	Round 2	1–2
2025	Wilmington, Delaware	Round 3	1–2
2026	Freehold Township, New Jersey	Round 1	0–2

=== Results by State ===
As of the 2026 Junior League World Series.

State	Region Championships	JLWS Championships	Record	PCT
New Jersey	11	0	13–22	.371
Pennsylvania	8	0	14–15	.483
(New York (state)) New York	6	0	7–17	.292
Maryland	5	1	9–8	.529
Delaware	5	0	6–12	.333
(New Jersey) Host Team(s)	3	0	5–7	.417
Connecticut	2	0	2–4	.333
Massachusetts	2	0	2–6	.250
New Hampshire	1	1	4–0	1.000
Rhode Island	1	0	2–2	.500
Total	44	2	64–93	.408

== See also ==
East Region in other Little League divisions

- Little League – East 1957-2000
  - Little League – Mid-Atlantic
  - Little League – New England
- Intermediate League
- Senior League
- Big League
