= Junior League World Series (Canada Region) =

Canada Region
- Most recent season or competition: 2026 Junior League World Series
- Sport: Baseball
- Founded: 1988
- Country: (Canada)
- Most recent champion: Kingston, Ontario
- Most titles: British Columbia (15)

The Junior League World Series Canada Region is one of six International regions that currently sends teams to the World Series in Taylor, Michigan. The region's participation in the JLWS dates back to 1988.

== Canada Region Provinces ==
- Alberta
- British Columbia
- New Brunswick
- Nova Scotia
- Ontario
- Quebec
- Saskatchewan

== Region Champions ==
As of the 2026 Junior League World Series.

Year	City	JLWS	Record
1988	Sherbrooke, Quebec	Fourth Place	2–2
1989	Edmonton, Alberta	Round 2	1–2
1990	Whalley, British Columbia	Round 1	0–2
1991	Windsor, Ontario	Round 2	1–2
1992	Orleans, Ontario	Round 2	1–2
1993	Salaberry-de-Valleyfield, Quebec	Round 1	0–2
1994	Surrey, British Columbia	Round 2	1–2
1995	LaSalle, Ontario	Third Place	2–2
1996	Surrey, British Columbia	Round 2	1–2
1997	Surrey, British Columbia	Third Place	3–2
1998	Surrey, British Columbia	Third Place	2–2
1999	Coquitlam, British Columbia (Host)	Fourth Place	3–2
2000	Langley, British Columbia	Runner-up	3–2
2001	Surrey, British Columbia	Int'l Final	2–2
2002	Langley, British Columbia	Pool stage	1–2
2003	Surrey, British Columbia	Int'l Final	3–1
2004	Moose Jaw, Saskatchewan	Pool stage	1–3
2005	Ottawa, Ontario	Pool stage	2–2
2006	Ottawa, Ontario	Pool stage	2–2
2007	Surrey, British Columbia	Int'l Final	3–2
2008	Coquitlam, British Columbia (Host)	Pool stage	1–3
2009	Coquitlam, British Columbia	Pool stage	0–4
2010	Coquitlam, British Columbia	Pool stage	0–4
2011	Surrey, British Columbia	Pool stage	1–3
2012	Calgary, Alberta	Pool stage	0–4
2013	Calgary, Alberta	Pool stage	0–4
2014	Regina, Saskatchewan	Pool stage	2–2
2015	Oakville, Ontario	Pool stage	0–4
2016	Lethbridge, Alberta (Host)	Round 2	1–2
2017	Lethbridge, Alberta (Host)	Round 1	0–2
2018	Mirabel, Quebec	Round 1	0–2
2019	Medicine Hat, Alberta	Round 1	0–2
2020	Cancelled due to COVID-19 pandemic		
2021	Cancelled due to COVID-19 pandemic		
2022	Vancouver, British Columbia	Round 1	0–2
2023	Mirabel, Quebec	Round 3	1–2
2024	North Vancouver, British Columbia	Round 3	2–2
2025	Kingston, Ontario	Round 1	0–2
2026	Kingston, Ontario	Round 1	0–2

=== Results by Province ===
As of the 2026 Junior League World Series.

Province	Region Championships	JLWS Championships	Record	PCT
British Columbia	15	0	22–34	.393
Ontario	8	0	8–18	.308
(British Columbia) (Alberta) Host Team(s)	4	0	5–9	.357
Alberta	4	0	1–12	.077
Quebec	4	0	3–8	.273
Saskatchewan	2	0	3–5	.375
Total	37	0	42–86	.328

== See also ==
- Baseball awards § World

Canada Region in other Little League divisions

- Little League
- Intermediate League
- Senior League
- Big League
