= 2019 Junior League World Series =

International children's baseball competition

2019 Junior League Baseball World Series
Tournament information
- Location: Taylor, Michigan
- Dates: August 11–18

Final positions
- Champions: Fullerton, Southern California
- Runner-up: Guayama, Puerto Rico

The 2019 Junior League Baseball World Series took place from August 11–18 in Taylor, Michigan. Fullerton, Southern California defeated Guayama, Puerto Rico in the championship game.

Taiwan's Junior League World Series record-winning streaks of championships (6), and games (37), were ended by Puerto Rico in the International Championship.

== Teams ==
United States	International
(Michigan) Taylor, Michigan; District 5 Host	(Taiwan) Taoyuan, Taiwan; Hsin Ming; Asia–Pacific
(Iowa) Johnston, Iowa; Johnston; Central	(Western Australia) Perth, Western Australia; Perth Metro North; Australia
(Maryland) Berlin, Maryland; Berlin; East	(Alberta) Medicine Hat, Alberta; Medicine Hat; Canada
(Florida) Melbourne, Florida; Viera/Suntree; Southeast	(Italy) Bologna, Italy; Emilia Romagna; Europe–Africa
(Oklahoma) Tulsa, Oklahoma; Tulsa National; Southwest	(Mexico) Reynosa, Mexico; Guadalupe Trevino Kelly; Latin America
(California) Fullerton, Southern California; Golden Hill; West	Guayama, Puerto Rico; Radames Lopez; Puerto Rico

== Results ==
United States Bracket

—
—	Michigan	5
—	Oklahoma	9
—	Florida (F/5)	15
—	Maryland	2
Lower round 1
1–1	Oklahoma	3
0–1	Maryland (F/4)	19
0–1	Michigan	10
0–1	Iowa	5

—
1–0	Oklahoma	2
—	California	6
1–0	Florida	7
—	Iowa	1
Lower round 2
1–1	Maryland	1
1–1	Michigan	5

—
1–0	California	12
2–0	Florida	5
Lower final
2–1	Florida	13
2–1	Michigan	9

United States Championship
2–0	California	7
3–1	Florida	2

International Bracket

—
—	Puerto Rico	4
—	Canada	0
—	Taiwan (F/5)	10
—	Australia	0
Lower round 1
0–1	Canada	1
0–1	Mexico	10
0–1	Italy	0
0–1	Australia	6

—
1–0	Puerto Rico (F/6)	15
—	Italy	4
1–0	Taiwan	7
—	Mexico	4
Lower round 2
1–1	Mexico	16
1–1	Australia	5

—
2–0	Puerto Rico	1
2–0	Taiwan	5
Lower final
2–1	Puerto Rico	2
2–1	Mexico	1

International Championship
3–0	Taiwan	3
3–1	Puerto Rico (F/8)	4

Elimination Round

Semifinals
2–0	California	7
3–1	Florida	2
3–0	Taiwan	3
3–1	Puerto Rico (F/8)	4

World Championship
3–0	California	8
4–1	Puerto Rico	3

2019 Junior League World Series Champions
Golden Hill LL
Fullerton, California
