= 2018 Junior League World Series =

International children's baseball competition

Tournament information
- Location: Taylor, Michigan
- Dates: August 12–19

Final positions
- Champions: Taoyuan, Taiwan
- Runner-up: Lufkin, East Texas (Fierce 14)

The 2018 Junior League World Series took place from August 12–19 in Taylor, Michigan. Taoyuan, Taiwan defeated Lufkin, East Texas in the championship game. It was Taiwan's sixth straight championship.

The return of the Host Team raised the total number of teams to 12.

== Teams ==
United States	International
(Michigan) Brownstown, Michigan; District 5 Host	(Taiwan) Taoyuan, Taiwan; Hsin Ming; Asia–Pacific
(Illinois) Chicago, Illinois; Warren Park; Central	(New South Wales) Sydney, New South Wales; Hills; Australia
(Pennsylvania) Johnsonburg/Kane/Ridgway, Pennsylvania; Johnsonburg/Kane/Ridgway; East	(Quebec) Mirabel, Quebec; Diamond; Canada
(Georgia (U.S. state)) Elberton, Georgia; Elbert County; Southeast	(Italy) Bologna, Italy; Emilia Romagna; Europe–Africa
(Texas) Lufkin (The Fierce 14), East Texas; Lufkin; Southwest	Santa Cruz, Aruba; Aruba Center; Latin America
(California) Manhattan Beach, Southern California; Manhattan; West	Reynosa, Tamaulipas; Guadalupe Trevino Kelly; Mexico

== Results ==
United States Bracket

—
—	California (F/9)	2
—	Pennsylvania	1
—	Texas	7
—	Illinois	6
Lower round 1
0–1	Pennsylvania	7
0–1	(Georgia (U.S. state)) Georgia	6
0–1	Michigan	0
0–1	Illinois	7

—
1–0	California	8
—	Michigan	0
1–0	Texas	9
—	(Georgia (U.S. state)) Georgia	0
Lower round 2
1–1	Pennsylvania	3
1–1	Illinois	5

—
2–0	California	0
2–0	Texas	2
Lower final
2–1	California	9
2–1	Illinois	5

United States Championship
3–0	Texas	5
3–1	California	2

International Bracket

—
—	Aruba (F/8)	3
—	Mexico	2
—	Australia	7
—	Italy	5
Lower round 1
0–1	Mexico	4
0–1	Canada	2
1–1	Aruba	3
0–1	Italy	9

—
1–0	Aruba	3
—	Taiwan (F/8)	8
1–0	Australia (F/8)	14
—	Canada	9
Lower round 2
1–1	Mexico	8
1–1	Italy	5

—
1–0	Taiwan (F/5)	10
2–0	Australia	0
Lower final
2–1	Australia	2
2–1	Mexico	7

International Championship
2–0	Taiwan (F/5)	10
3–1	Mexico	0

Elimination Round

Semifinals
3–0	Texas	5
3–1	California	2
2–0	Taiwan (F/5)	10
3–1	Mexico	0

World Championship
4–0	Texas	0
3–0	Taiwan	2

2018 Junior League World Series Champions
Hsin Ming LL
Taoyuan, Taiwan
