= Junior League World Series (Latin America Region) =

Latin America Region
- Most recent season or competition: 2026 Junior League World Series
- Sport: Baseball
- Founded: 2000
- Most recent champion: Santa Cruz, Aruba
- Most titles: Panama (5); Curaçao (5); Venezuela (5)

The Junior League World Series Latin America Region is one of six International regions that currently sends teams to the World Series in Taylor, Michigan. The region's participation in the JLWS dates back to 2000.

== Latin America Region Countries ==
- Aruba
- Bonaire
- Colombia
- Costa Rica
- Curaçao
- Dominican Republic
- Guatemala
- Mexico
- Nicaragua
- Panama
- Puerto Rico
- St. Maarten
- Venezuela
- US Virgin Islands

== Region Champions ==
As of the 2026 Junior League World Series.

See: Junior League World Series § Tournament history.

Prior to 2000, the champions of Mexico and Puerto Rico received automatic bids to the World Series. From 2000 to 2003, both Mexico and Puerto Rico were part of the Latin America Region. Starting in 2004, the Mexico Region has an automatic berth in even-numbered years and the Puerto Rico Region in odd-numbered years. In the alternating years that each region does not have an automatic bid, that region's teams compete in the Latin America Region tournament.

=== Latin America Region Champions ===
Year	City	JLWS	Record
2000	San Pedro, Mexico	Round 1	0–2
2001	San Francisco, Venezuela	Runner-up	4–1
2002	David, Panama	Runner-up	4–1
2003	Santiago, Panama	Runner-up	3–2
2004	Punto Fijo, Venezuela	Runner-up	5–1
2005	Panama City, Panama	Champions	5–1
2006	Maracaibo, Venezuela	Int'l Final	4–1
2007	(United States Virgin Islands) St. Thomas, U.S. Virgin Islands	Pool stage	2–2
2008	Willemstad, Curaçao	Champions	6–0
2009	Oranjestad, Aruba	Runner-up	4–2
2010	Guatemala City, Guatemala	Int'l Final	3–2
2011	Maracaibo, Venezuela	Int'l Final	3–2
2012	Oranjestad, Aruba	Runner-up	4–2
2013	Willemstad, Curaçao	Int'l Final	3–2
2014	Willemstad, Curaçao	Int'l Final	2–3
2015	Aguadulce, Panama (Host)	Pool stage	2–2
2016	Juan Díaz, Panama	Round 3	2–2
2017	Maracaibo, Venezuela	Int'l Final	2–2
2018	Santa Cruz, Aruba	Round 1	1–2
2019	Reynosa, Mexico (Host)	Round 3	2–2
2020	Cancelled due to COVID-19 pandemic		
2021	Cancelled due to COVID-19 pandemic		
2022	Willemstad, Curaçao	Round 3	2–2
2023	Willemstad, Curaçao	Int'l Final	2–1
2024	Rivas, Nicaragua	Int'l Final	4–2
2025	Antón, Coclé Province, Panama	Int'l Final	3–2
2026	Santa Cruz, Aruba	Int'l Final	2–2

=== Mexico Region Champions ===
Year	City	JLWS	Record
1986	Hermosillo	Fourth Place	2–2
1987	Hermosillo	Third Place	3–2
1988	Mexicali	Champions	4–0
1989	Hermosillo	Round 1	0–2
1990		Round 1	0–2
1991		Fourth Place	2–2
1992	Guaymas	Round 2	1–2
1993	Reynosa	Runner-up	3–2
1994	Matamoros	Fourth Place	2–2
1995	Hermosillo	Fourth Place	2–2
1996	Monterrey	Fourth Place	2–2
1997	Puente de Ixtla	Round 2	1–2
1998	Guadalupe	Fourth Place	2–2
1999	Hermosillo	Runner-up	3–2
2004	Guaymas	Int'l Final	3–2
2006	Guaymas	Runner-up	3–3
2008	Veracruz	Int'l Final	3–2
2010	Guaymas	Pool stage	2–2
2012	San Nicolás	Int'l Final	4–1
2014	Mexicali	Pool stage	2–2
2016	Guadalupe	Int'l Final	3–2
2018	Reynosa	Int'l Final	3–2
2022	Ciudad Victoria	Round 2	1–2
2024	Matamoros	Round 2	1–2
2026	Matamoros	Round 3	3–2

=== Puerto Rico Region Champions ===
Year	City	JLWS	Record
1982	Vega Baja	Third Place	2–2
1983	Manatí	Champions	3–0
1984	Yabucoa	Runner-up	2–2
1985	Isabela	Fourth Place	1–2
1986	Yabucoa	Third Place	3–2
1987	Arroyo	Round 2	1–2
1988	Manatí	Round 1	0–2
1989	Manatí	Champions	4–1
1990	Yabucoa	Champions	4–0
1991		Round 2	1–2
1992	Yabucoa	Third Place	2–2
1993	Cayey	Champions	4–0
1994		Round 1	0–2
1995	Yabucoa	Round 2	1–2
1996	Yabucoa	Round 2	1–2
1997	Yabucoa	Round 2	1–2
1998	Arroyo	Round 2	1–2
1999	Arroyo	Champions	4–0
2005	Arroyo	Int'l Final	4–1
2007	Guayama	Pool stage	1–3
2009	Yabucoa	Int'l Final	4–1
2011	Yabucoa	Pool stage	1–3
2013	Manatí	Pool stage	2–2
2015	Caguas	Int'l Final	3–2
2017	Yabucoa	Round 1	1–2
2019	Guayama	Runner-up	4–2
2023	Vega Baja	Round 2	2–2
2025	Bayamón	Round 2	1–2

==== Results by Country (Latin America Region Champions) ====
As of the 2026 Junior League World Series.

Country	Region Championships	JLWS Championships	W–L	PCT
Panama	5	1	17–8	.680
Curaçao	5	1	15–8	.652
Venezuela	5	0	18–7	.720
Aruba	4	0	11–8	.579
(Panama) (Mexico) Host Team(s)	2	0	4–4	.500
Nicaragua	1	0	4–2	.667
Guatemala	1	0	3–2	.600
(United States Virgin Islands) U.S. Virgin Islands	1	0	2–2	.500
Mexico	1	0	0–2	.000
Total	25	2	74–43	.632

==== Results by Country (Automatic bids) ====
As of the 2026 Junior League World Series.

Country	JLWS Appearances	JLWS Championships	W–L	PCT
Puerto Rico	28	5	58–47	.552
Mexico	25	1	55–48	.534
Total	53	6	113–95	.543

== See also ==
Latin America Region in other Little League divisions

- Little League – Latin America
- Little League – Caribbean
- Little League – Mexico
- Intermediate League
- Senior League – Latin America
- Senior League – Caribbean
- Big League
