= Junior League World Series (South Region) =

Baseball tournament region

Southeast Region
- Most recent season or competition: 2026 Junior League World Series
- Sport: Baseball
- Founded: 2002
- No. of teams: 8
- Country: United States
- Most recent champion: Murfreesboro, Tennessee
- Most titles: Florida (6); Virginia (6)

Southwest Region
- Most recent season or competition: 2026 Junior League World Series
- Sport: Baseball
- Founded: 2002
- No. of teams: 8
- Country: United States
- Most recent champion: Albuquerque, New Mexico
- Most titles: West Texas (10)

The Junior League World Series Southeast and Southwest regions—formerly the South Region, until 2002—are two of the six United States regions that currently send teams to the World Series in Taylor, Michigan. Together, the regions' participation in the JLWS dates back to 1981.

== South Region States ==
In 2002 the region was split in half, into Southeast and Southwest regions.

Southeast

- Alabama
- Florida
- (Georgia (U.S. state)) Georgia
- North Carolina
- South Carolina
- Tennessee
- Virginia
- West Virginia

Southwest

- Arkansas
- Colorado
- Louisiana
- Mississippi
- New Mexico
- Oklahoma
- Texas (East)
- Texas (West)

== Region Champions ==
=== South Region Champions ===
South Region
- Most recent season or competition: 2001 Junior League World Series
- Sport: Baseball
- Founded: 1981
- Folded: 2001
- Country: United States
- Last champions: Lake Charles, Louisiana
- Most titles: Florida (6); Texas (6)

Year	City	JLWS	Record
1981	Richmond, Virginia	Runner-up	2–2
1982	Tampa, Florida	Champions	3–0
1983	Altamonte Springs, Florida	Runner-up	3–2
1984	Brenham, Texas	Fourth Place	2–3
1985	Tampa, Florida	Champions	4–0
1986	Chapmanville, West Virginia	Round 2	1–2
1987	Bristol, Tennessee	Round 2	1–2
1988	Altamonte Springs, Florida	Third Place	3–2
1989	(Georgia (U.S. state)) Toccoa, Georgia	Runner-up	4–2
1990	San Antonio, Texas	Runner-up	4–2
1991	Spring, Texas	Champions	4–1
1992	Lake Charles, Louisiana	Runner-up	3–2
1993	Taylors, South Carolina	Round 2	1–2
1994	Jacksonville, Florida	Round 2	1–2
1995	Lake Charles, Louisiana	Champions	4–1
1996	Spring, Texas	Champions	4–0
1997	Richmond, Texas	Fourth Place	2–2
1998	Waco, Texas	Runner-up	3–2
1999	Lake Charles, Louisiana	Third Place	3–2
2000	Palm Harbor, Florida	Third Place	3–2
2001	Lake Charles, Louisiana	US Final	2–2

==== Results by State ====
State	Region Championships	JLWS Championships	Record	PCT
Florida	6	2	17–8	.680
Texas	6	2	19–10	.655
Louisiana	4	1	12–7	.632
(Georgia (U.S. state)) Georgia	1	0	4–2	.667
Virginia	1	0	2–2	.500
West Virginia	1	0	1–2	.333
Tennessee	1	0	1–2	.333
South Carolina	1	0	1–2	.333
Total	21	5	57–35	.620

As of the 2026 Junior League World Series.

=== Southeast Region Champions ===
Year	City	JLWS	Record
2002	(Georgia (U.S. state)) Cartersville, Georgia	Champions	6–0
2003	Bridgewater, Virginia	US Final	4–1
2004	Tampa, Florida	Champions	6–0
2005	Tarpon Springs, Florida	Runner-up	4–2
2006	Alexandria, Virginia	Pool stage	1–3
2007	Anderson, South Carolina	Pool stage	0–4
2008	Mechanicsville, Virginia	Pool stage	2–2
2009	Easley, South Carolina	Pool stage	0–4
2010	Mechanicsville, Virginia	Pool stage	1–3
2011	Tampa, Florida	Champions	6–0
2012	Rockledge, Florida	Champions	6–0
2013	Goodlettsville, Tennessee	US Final	3–2
2014	Rutherfordton, North Carolina	Pool stage	2–2
2015	Stephens City, Virginia	Runner-up	3–3
2016	Taylors, South Carolina	Round 3	2–2
2017	Rutherfordton, North Carolina	US Final	2–2
2018	(Georgia (U.S. state)) Elberton, Georgia	Round 1	0–2
2019	Melbourne, Florida	US Final	3–2
2020	Cancelled due to COVID-19 pandemic		
2021	Cancelled due to COVID-19 pandemic		
2022	South Riding, Virginia	Round 3	2–2
2023	Irmo, South Carolina	US Final	3–2
2024	Tampa, Florida	US Final	4–2
2025	(Georgia (U.S. state)) Macon, Georgia	Runner-up	3–1
2026	Murfreesboro, Tennessee	Round 2	2–2

=== Southwest Region Champions ===
Year	City	JLWS	Record
2002	Lake Charles, Louisiana	Pool stage	1–3
2003	Sugar Land, East Texas	Pool stage	2–2
2004	Fort Worth, West Texas	Pool stage	1–3
2005	Fort Worth, West Texas	Pool stage	2–2
2006	El Campo, East Texas	Champions	5–1
2007	Laredo, West Texas	US Final	3–2
2008	Alvin, East Texas	Pool stage	1–3
2009	Albuquerque, New Mexico	Pool stage	2–2
2010	Tyler, East Texas	Runner-up	4–2
2011	Rosenberg, East Texas	Pool stage	0–4
2012	Corpus Christi, West Texas	US Final	3–2
2013	Lafayette, Louisiana	Pool stage	2–2
2014	Corpus Christi, West Texas	Runner-up	4–2
2015	Weslaco, West Texas	Pool stage	0–4
2016	Corpus Christi, West Texas	US Final	2–2
2017	Abilene, West Texas	Round 2	1–2
2018	Lufkin, East Texas	Runner-up	4–1
2019	Tulsa, Oklahoma	Round 1	1–2
2020	Cancelled due to COVID-19 pandemic		
2021	Cancelled due to COVID-19 pandemic		
2022	Corpus Christi, West Texas	Runner-up	3–1
2023	Lubbock, West Texas	Round 1	0–2
2024	New Braunfels, East Texas	Round 3	1–2
2025	Needville, East Texas	US Final	3–2
2026	Albuquerque, New Mexico	Round 1	0–2

==== Results by State ====
As of the 2026 Junior League World Series.

State	Region Championships	JLWS Championships	Record	PCT
Florida	6	3	29–6	.829
Virginia	6	0	13–14	.481
South Carolina	4	0	5–12	.294
(Georgia (U.S. state)) Georgia	3	1	9–3	.750
Tennessee	2	0	5–4	.556
North Carolina	2	0	4–4	.500
Total	23	4	65–43	.602

State	Region Championships	JLWS Championships	Record	PCT
West Texas	10	0	19–22	.463
East Texas	8	1	20–17	.541
Louisiana	2	0	3–5	.375
New Mexico	2	0	2–4	.333
Oklahoma	1	0	1–2	.333
Total	23	1	45–50	.474

== See also ==
South Region in other Little League divisions

- Little League – South 1957-2000
  - Little League – Southeast
  - Little League – Southwest
- Intermediate League
- Senior League
- Big League
