= 2010 Junior League World Series =

Tournament information
- Location: Taylor, Michigan
- Dates: August 15–21

Final positions
- Champions: Taipei, Taiwan
- Runner-up: Tyler, Texas

The 2010 Junior League World Series took place from August 15–21 in Taylor, Michigan, United States. Taipei, Taiwan defeated Tyler, Texas in the championship game.

== Teams ==
United States	International
Jeffersonville, Indiana; Jeff/GRC; Central	Taipei, Taiwan; Chung Ching; Asia–Pacific
Freehold Township, New Jersey; Freehold Township; East	Coquitlam, British Columbia; Coquitlam; Canada
Mechanicsville, Virginia; Mechanicsville; Southeast	Kirovohrad, Ukraine; Kirovohrad/Rivne; EMEA
Tyler, Texas; Rose Capital East; Southwest	Guatemala City, Guatemala; Javier; Latin America
El Monte, California; El Monte American; West	Guaymas, Sonora; Guaymas Sector Pesca; Mexico

== Results ==
United States Pool

Team	W	L	Rs	Ra
California	3	1	31	23
Texas	3	1	19	10
Indiana	2	2	19	26
Virginia	1	3	19	28
New Jersey	1	3	19	20

	(California)	(Indiana)	(New Jersey)	(Texas)	(Virginia)
California	–	3–11	11–2	5–1	12–9
Indiana	11–3	–	1–12	0–7	7–4
New Jersey	2–11	12–1	–	3–4	2–4
Texas	1–5	7–0	4–3	–	7–2
Virginia	9–12	4–7	4–2	2–7	–

International Pool

Team	W	L	Rs	Ra
Taiwan	4	0	38	7
Guatemala	3	1	17	19
Mexico	2	2	25	16
Ukraine	1	3	7	23
Canada	0	4	9	31

	(Canada)	(Guatemala)	(Mexico)	(Taiwan)	(Ukraine)
Canada	–	4–5	1–11	0–10	4–5
Guatemala	5–4	–	7–6	2–7	3–2
Mexico	11–1	6–7	–	5–8	3–0
Taiwan	10–0	7–2	8–5	–	13–0
Ukraine	5–4	2–3	0–3	0–13	–

Elimination Round

Semifinals
3–1	California	2
3–1	Texas	8
4–0	Taiwan	10
3–1	Guatemala	3

World Championship
4–1	Texas	1
5–0	Taiwan	9

2010 Junior League World Series Champions
Chung Ching LL
Taipei, Taiwan
