= 2026 Junior League World Series =

Baseball tournament

Tournament information
- Location: Taylor, Michigan
- Dates: August 9–August 16

Final positions
- Champions: La Mirada, California
- Runner-up: Taoyuan, Taiwan

The 2026 Junior League World Series took place from August 9–16 in Taylor, Michigan. La Mirada, California defeated Taoyuan, Taiwan in the championship game with a score of 6–3 in 10 innings.

== Teams ==
United States	International
(Michigan) Taylor, Michigan; District 5 (Taylor North); Host	Taoyuan, Taiwan; Shing-Ming Junior; Asia–Pacific
(Wisconsin) Whitefish Bay, Wisconsin; Whitefish Bay; Central	(Western Australia) Perth, Western Australia; Perth Metro East; Australia
Freehold Township, New Jersey; Freehold Township; East	Kingston, Ontario; Kingston; Canada
(Tennessee) Murfreesboro, Tennessee; Murfreesboro; Southeast	(Italy) Bologna, Italy; Emilia Romagna; Europe–Africa
(New Mexico) Albuquerque, New Mexico; Roadrunner; Southwest	Santa Cruz, Aruba; Aruba Center; Latin America
(California) La Mirada, California; La Mirada; West	Matamoros, Tamaulipas; Liga Matamoros A.C. Mexico

== Results ==
=== United States Bracket ===
Upper round 1
–	Tennessee	10
–	Wisconsin	4
—	New Jersey	1
—	(Michigan) Host	6
Lower round 1
0–1	New Jersey	4
1–1	Tennessee	8
0–1	New Mexico	3
0–1	Wisconsin	4

Upper round 2
—	California	5
1—0	Tennessee	3
—	New Mexico	0
1—0	(Michigan) Host	10
Lower round 2
2–1	Tennessee	2
1–1	Wisconsin	3

Upper final
1–0	California	4
2–0	(Michigan) Host	2
Lower final
2–1	(Michigan) Host	10
2–1	Wisconsin	4

United States Championship
2–0	California	16
3–1	(Michigan) Host	0

=== International Bracket ===
Upper round 1
–	Mexico	19
–	Canada	2
–	Australia	0
–	Italy	4
Lower round 1
1–1	Italy	10
0–1	Canada	4
0–1	Australia	4
1–1	Mexico	5

Upper round 2
–	Taiwan	4
1–0	Mexico	0
–	Aruba	3
1–0	Italy	2
Lower round 2
2–1	Italy	1
2–1	Mexico	3

Upper final
1–0	Taiwan	10
1–0	Aruba	0
Lower final
1–1	Aruba	3
3–1	Mexico	2

International Championship
2–0	Taiwan	6
2–1	Aruba	0

=== World Championship ===
World Championship
3–0	California (F/10)	6
3–0	Taiwan	3

2026 Junior League World Series Champions
La Mirada LL
La Mirada, California
