= 2009 Junior League World Series =

Tournament information
- Location: Taylor, Michigan
- Dates: August 16–22

Final positions
- Champions: Scottsdale, Arizona
- Runner-up: Oranjestad, Aruba

The 2009 Junior League World Series took place from August 16–22 in Taylor, Michigan, United States. Scottsdale, Arizona defeated Oranjestad, Aruba in the championship game.

== Teams ==
United States	International
Middlebury, Indiana; Middlebury; Central	Saipan, Northern Mariana Islands; Saipan; Asia–Pacific
Jackson, New Jersey; Jackson; East	Coquitlam, British Columbia; Coquitlam; Canada
Easley, South Carolina; Easley; Southeast	Friuli, Italy; Friuli Venezia Giulia; EMEA
Albuquerque, New Mexico; Petroglyph; Southwest	Oranjestad, Aruba; Aruba North; Latin America
Scottsdale, Arizona; Mountain View; West	Yabucoa, Puerto Rico; Juan A. Bibiloni; Puerto Rico

== Results ==
United States Pool

Team	W	L	Rs	Ra
Arizona	4	0	31	13
Indiana	2	2	21	16
New Jersey	2	2	28	21
New Mexico	2	2	19	33
South Carolina	0	4	13	29

	(Arizona)	(Indiana)	(New Jersey)	(New Mexico)	(South Carolina)
Arizona	–	4–0	10–8	7–4	10–1
Indiana	0–4	–	7–2	5–6	9–4
New Jersey	8–10	2–7	–	15–2	3–2
New Mexico	4–7	6–5	2–15	–	7–6
South Carolina	1–10	4–9	2–3	6–7	–

International Pool

Team	W	L	Rs	Ra
Puerto Rico	4	0	29	8
Aruba	3	1	56	11
Northern Mariana Islands	2	2	28	27
Italy	1	3	13	48
Canada	0	4	20	52

	(Aruba)	(Canada)	(Italy)	(Northern Mariana Islands)	(Puerto Rico)
Aruba	–	24–1	23–1	5–3	4–6
Canada	1–24	–	8–9^{(9)}	9–11	2–8
Italy	1–23	9–8^{(9)}	–	2–13	1–4
Northern Mariana Islands	3–5	11–9	13–2	–	1–11
Puerto Rico	6–4	8–2	4–1	11–1	–

Elimination Round

Semifinals
4–0	Arizona	6
2–2	Indiana	2
4–0	Puerto Rico	5
3–1	Aruba	7

World Championship
5–0	Arizona	9
4–1	Aruba	1

2009 Junior League World Series Champions
Mountain View LL
Scottsdale, Arizona
