= Junior League World Series (Australia Region) =

Australia Region
- Most recent season or competition: 2026 Junior League World Series
- Sport: Baseball
- Founded: 2016
- Most recent champion: Perth, Western Australia
- Most titles: New South Wales (4); Western Australia (4)

The Junior League World Series Australia Region is one of six International regions that currently sends teams to the World Series in Taylor, Michigan. The region's participation in the JLWS dates back to 2016.

The process of becoming the Australia Region representative starts in March and April each year with state based tournaments.

Each state and territory (with the exclusion of Tasmania and the Northern Territory) have a set number of qualification berths for the National Championships those positions filled based on state tournament rankings.

Each year in late May / early June, 16 charter teams from around Australia play in the Junior League National Championships.

The entire tournament is held over five days, across two fields at the Diamond Sports Stadium in the Adelaide suburb of West Beach. The complex is home to Baseball SA and the Adelaide giants who play in the Australian Baseball League, junior teams able to use the same indoor hitting tunnels at the facility.

The 16 teams are divided into 4 pools of 4 teams each. After each team plays 3 pool games, the top 2 teams from each pool progress to the quarter-finals, whilst the bottom 2 go into consolation seeding games. Every team plays one game, every day, for 5 consecutive days.

Games played on Diamond One (Bennett Field, where the Adelaide Giants play) are live streamed.

== Australia Region states ==
- Australian Capital Territory
- New South Wales
- Queensland
- South Australia
- Victoria
- Western Australia

== Region champions ==
As of the 2026 Junior League World Series.

Year	City	JLWS	Record
2016	Sydney, New South Wales	Round 1	0–2
2017	Sydney, New South Wales	Round 3	2–2
2018	Sydney, New South Wales	Round 3	2–2
2019	Perth, Western Australia	Round 2	1–2
2020	Cancelled due to COVID-19 pandemic		
2021	Cancelled due to COVID-19 pandemic		
2022	Perth, Western Australia	Round 1	0–2
2023	Perth, Western Australia	Round 1	0–2
2024	Sydney, New South Wales	Round 1	0–2
2025	Brisbane, Queensland	Round 1	0–2
2026	Perth, Western Australia	Round 1	0–2

=== Results by state ===
As of the 2026 Junior League World Series.

Country	Region Championships	JLWS Championships	W–L	PCT
New South Wales	4	0	4–8	.333
Western Australia	4	0	1–8	.111
Queensland	1	0	0–2	.000
Total	9	0	5–18	.217

== See also ==
Australia Region in other Little League divisions

- Little League
- Intermediate League
- Senior League
