= Junior League World Series (Host Team) =

The Junior League World Series Host team is one of six United States regions that sends teams to the World Series in Taylor, Michigan. The host team first competed in the JLWS in 1985. It was discontinued after 1989, but returned in 2018.

== Host teams at the Junior League World Series ==
As of the 2026 Junior League World Series.

Year	City	JLWS	Record
1985	Michigan – State Champion	Round 1	1–2
1986	Michigan – State Champion	Round 1	0–3
1987	Michigan – State Champion	Round 1	0–3
1988	Michigan – State Champion	Round 1	0–2
1989	Michigan – State Champion	Fourth Place	2–2
2018	Michigan – District 5 Champion	Round 1	0–2
2019	Michigan – District 5 Champion	Round 3	2–2
2020	Cancelled due to COVID-19 pandemic		
2021	Cancelled due to COVID-19 pandemic		
2022	Michigan – District 5 Champion	Round 2	1–2
2023	Michigan – District 5 Champion	Runner-up	3–1
2024	Michigan – District 5 Champion	Runner-up	4–1
2025	Michigan – District 5 Champion	Round 1	1–2
2026	Michigan – District 5 Champion	US Final	3–2

== Results by Host ==
As of the 2026 Junior League World Series.

City	JLWS Appearances	JLWS Championships	W–L	PCT
Michigan – District 5 Champion	7	0	14–12	.538
Michigan – State Champion	5	0	3–12	.200
Total	12	0	17–24	.415

== See also ==
- Host Teams in other Little League divisions:
  - Intermediate League
  - Senior League
  - Big League
