= 2008 Junior League World Series =

28th edition of Junior League baseball tournament

Tournament information
- Location: Taylor, Michigan
- Dates: August 10–16

Final positions
- Champions: Willemstad, Curaçao
- Runner-up: Hilo, Hawaii

The 2008 Junior League World Series took place from August 10–16 in Taylor, Michigan, United States. Willemstad, Curaçao defeated Hilo, Hawaii in the championship game.

== Teams ==
United States	International
Johnston, Iowa; Johnston; Central	Makati, Philippines; Illam Central; Asia–Pacific
Canton, Massachusetts; Canton; East	Coquitlam, British Columbia; Coquitlam; Canada
Mechanicsville, Virginia; Atlee YMCA; Southeast	London, England; London Area Youth; EMEA
Alvin, Texas; Alvin; Southwest	Willemstad, Curaçao; Pabao; Latin America
Hilo, Hawaii; Hilo; West	Veracruz, Veracruz; Beto Ávila; Mexico

== Results ==
United States Pool

Team	W	L	Rs	Ra
Hawaii	3	1	36	16
Iowa	3	1	30	20
Virginia	2	2	25	28
Massachusetts	1	3	17	26
Texas	1	3	20	38

	(Hawaii)	(Iowa)	(Massachusetts)	(Texas)	(Virginia)
Hawaii	–	11–3	12–0	5–7	8–6
Iowa	3–11	–	2–1	12–8	13–0
Massachusetts	0–12	1–2	–	10–4	6–8
Texas	7–5	8–12	4–10	–	1–11
Virginia	6–8	0–13	8–6	11–1	–

International Pool

Team	W	L	Rs	Ra
Curaçao	4	0	35	11
Mexico	3	1	21	22
Philippines	2	2	22	19
Canada	1	3	24	25
England	0	4	11	39

	(Canada)	(Curaçao)	(England)	(Mexico)	(Philippines)
Canada	–	0–10	14–2	6–7	4–6
Curaçao	10–0	–	13–4	5–2	7–5
England	2–14	4–13	–	3–6	2–6
Mexico	7–6	2–5	6–3	–	6–5
Philippines	6–4	5–7	6–2	5–6	–

Elimination Round

Semifinals
3–1	Hawaii	6
3–1	Iowa	5
4–0	Curaçao	10
3–1	Mexico	8

World Championship
4–1	Hawaii	2
5–0	Curaçao	5

2008 Junior League World Series Champions
Pabao LL
Willemstad, Curaçao
