= 2013 Junior League World Series =

Tournament information
- Location: Taylor, Michigan
- Dates: August 11–17

Final positions
- Champions: Taoyuan, Taiwan
- Runner-up: Rio Rico, Arizona

The 2013 Junior League World Series took place from August 11–17 in Taylor, Michigan, United States. Taoyuan, Taiwan defeated Rio Rico, Arizona in the championship game.

== Teams ==
United States	International
Bedford, Indiana; North Lawrence; Central	Taoyuan, Taiwan; Hsin Ming; Asia–Pacific
(New York (state)) Massapequa Park, New York; Massapequa International; East	Calgary, Alberta; Rocky Mountain; Canada
Goodlettsville, Tennessee; Goodlettsville; Southeast	Brno, Czech Republic; South Moravia; Europe–Africa
Lafayette, Louisiana; Lafayette; Southwest	Willemstad, Curaçao; Pariba; Latin America
Rio Rico, Arizona; Rio Rico; West	Manatí, Puerto Rico; Jose M.Rodriguez; Puerto Rico

== Results ==
United States Pool

Team	W	L	Rs	Ra
Tennessee	3	1	25	23
Arizona	3	1	12	10
Louisiana	2	2	25	22
Indiana	2	2	20	18
(New York (state)) New York	0	4	14	23

	(Arizona)	(Indiana)	(Louisiana)	(New York (state))	(Tennessee)
Arizona	–	2–1^{(8)}	7–5	2–1	1–3
Indiana	1–2^{(8)}	–	2–3	11–9	6–4
Louisiana	5–7	3–2	–	5–0	12–13
New York (New York (state))	1–2	9–11	0–5	–	4–5^{(8)}
Tennessee	3–1	4–6	13–12	5–4^{(8)}	–

International Pool

Team	W	L	Rs	Ra
Taiwan	4	0	53	5
Curaçao	3	1	47	24
Puerto Rico	2	2	15	32
Czech Republic	1	3	18	27
Canada	0	4	10	55

	(Canada)	(Curaçao)	(Czech Republic)	(Puerto Rico)	(Taiwan)
Canada	–	2–18	5–9	1–9	2–19
Curaçao	18–2	–	13–6	14–3	2–13
Czech Republic	9–5	6–13	–	2–3	1–6
Puerto Rico	9–1	3–14	3–2	–	0–15
Taiwan	19–2	13–2	6–1	15–0	–

Elimination Round

Semifinals
3–1	Tennessee	3
3–1	Arizona	7
4–0	Taiwan	11
3–1	Curaçao	0

World Championship
4–1	Arizona	2
5–0	Taiwan	11

2013 Junior League World Series Champions
Hsin Ming LL
Taoyuan, Taiwan
