= 1985 Junior League World Series =

Annual baseball tournament in Taylor, Michigan

Tournament information
- Location: Taylor, Michigan
- Dates: August 12–17

Final positions
- Champions: Tampa, Florida
- Runner-up: Salisbury, Maryland

The 1985 Junior League World Series took place from August 12–17 in Taylor, Michigan, United States. Tampa, Florida defeated Salisbury, Maryland in the championship game.

This year featured the debut of the Host Team.

== Teams ==
United States	International
(Michigan) Midland, Michigan Host	Isabela, Puerto Rico Puerto Rico
(Illinois) Chicago, Illinois; Jackie Robinson West; Central	
(Maryland) Salisbury, Maryland; Salisbury National; East
(Florida) Tampa, Florida South
(California) Fullerton, California; Golden Hills; West

== Results ==
—
—	Michigan	5
—	California	2
—	Florida	11
—	Puerto Rico	5
Lower round 1
0–1	California	4
0–1	Puerto Rico	9
1–1	Michigan	4
0–1	Maryland	5

—
1–0	Michigan	1
—	Illinois (F/8)	2
1–0	Florida	5
—	Maryland	1
Lower round 2
1–1	Puerto Rico	1
1–1	Maryland	6

Semifinals
1–0	Illinois	5
2–0	Florida	10
Lower final
1–1	Illinois	2
2–1	Maryland	4

World Championship
3–0	Florida	10
3–1	Maryland	3

1985 Junior League World Series Champions
Tampa, Florida
