= 2022 Junior League World Series =

International children's baseball competition

Tournament information
- Location: Taylor, Michigan
- Dates: August 14–August 21

Final positions
- Champions: Taichung, Taiwan
- Runner-up: Corpus Christi, Texas

The 2022 Junior League World Series took place from August 14–21 in Taylor, Michigan. Taichung, Taiwan defeated Corpus Christi, Texas in the championship game. This was the first Junior Little League World Series since the COVID-19 pandemic.

== Teams ==
United States	International
(Michigan) Taylor, Michigan; District 5 (Taylor North); Host	Taichung, Taiwan; Chung Shan; Asia–Pacific
(Wisconsin) Whitefish Bay, Wisconsin; Whitefish Bay; Central	(Western Australia) Perth, Western Australia; Perth Metro East; Australia
(Pennsylvania) Clinton County, Pennsylvania; Keystone; East	Vancouver, British Columbia; South Vancouver; Canada
(Virginia) South Riding, Virginia; Loudoun South; Southeast	(Czech Republic) Brno, Czech Republic; South Czech Republic; Europe–Africa
(Texas) Corpus Christi, Texas; Oil Belt; Southwest	(Curaçao) Willemstad, Curaçao; Pabao; Latin America
(Hawaii) Honolulu, Hawaii; Honolulu; West	Ciudad Victoria, Tamaulipas; Santa Maria De Aguayo; Mexico

== Results ==
United States Bracket

—
—	Virginia	2
—	Wisconsin	4
—	Hawaii (F/8)	6
—	(Michigan) Host	5
Lower round 1
0–1	(Michigan) Host	7
1–1	Wisconsin	1
0–1	Virginia	7
1–1	Hawaii	6

—
–	Pennsylvania (F/6)	13
1–0	Wisconsin	1
–	Texas (F/5)	13
1–0	Hawaii	1
Lower round 2
1–1	(Michigan) Host	4
1–1	Virginia	11

—
1–0	Pennsylvania	3
1–0	Texas	10
Lower final
1–1	Pennsylvania	10
2–1	Virginia	6

United States Championship
2–0	Texas	12
2–1	Pennsylvania	4

International Bracket

—
—	Taiwan (F/6)	18
—	Czech Republic	0
—	Curaçao	11
—	Canada	9
Lower round 1
0–1	Czech Republic	3
0–1	Australia	2
0–1	Canada	0
0–1	Mexico (F/5)	10

—
–	Mexico	0
1–0	Taiwan (F/5)	12
–	Australia	5
1–0	Curaçao	9
Lower round 2
1–1	Czech Republic	9
1–1	Mexico	2

—
2–0	Taiwan (F/6)	13
2–0	Curaçao	0
Lower final
2–1	Curaçao	1
2–1	Czech Republic	2

International Championship
3–0	Taiwan	11
3–1	Czech Republic	0

Elimination Round

Semifinals
2–0	Texas	12
2–1	Pennsylvania	4
3–0	Taiwan	11
3–1	Czech Republic	0

World Championship
3–0	Texas	1
4–0	Taiwan	7

2022 Junior League World Series Champions
Chung Shan LL
Taichung, Taiwan
