= 2023 Junior League World Series =

International children's baseball competition

Tournament information
- Location: Taylor, Michigan
- Dates: August 13–August 20

Final positions
- Champions: Taoyuan, Taiwan
- Runner-up: Taylor, Michigan

The 2023 Junior League World Series took place from August 13–20 in Taylor, Michigan. Taoyuan, Taiwan defeated Taylor, Michigan in the championship game.

== Teams ==
United States	International
(Michigan) Taylor, Michigan; District 5 (Taylor North); Host	Taoyuan, Taiwan; Tao-Yuan; Asia–Pacific
(Illinois) Elmhurst/River Forest, Illinois; Elmhurst/River Forest; Central	(Western Australia) Perth, Western Australia; Wanneroo Giants; Australia
(New Jersey) Hillsdale, New Jersey; Hillsdale; East	Mirabel, Quebec; Diamond; Canada
(South Carolina) Irmo, South Carolina; Irmo; Southeast	(Czech Republic) Brno, Czech Republic; South Czech Republic; Europe–Africa
(Texas) Lubbock, Texas; Lubbock Southwest; Southwest	(Curaçao) Willemstad, Curaçao; Pabao; Latin America
(Hawaii) Honolulu, Hawaii; Honolulu; West	Vega Baja, Puerto Rico; Jaime Collazo; Puerto Rico

== Results ==
United States Bracket

—
—	Hawaii	9
—	Texas	0
—	Illinois	2
—	New Jersey	4
Lower round 1
0–1	Illinois	10
1–1	Hawaii	8
0–1	Texas	3
0–1	South Carolina (F/5)	13

—
–	Michigan	3
1–0	Hawaii	1
–	South Carolina	2
1–0	New Jersey	4
Lower round 2
1–1	Illinois	12
1–1	South Carolina	14

—
1–0	Michigan	3
2–0	New Jersey	1
Lower final
1–1	New Jersey	2
2–1	South Carolina	3

United States Championship
2–0	Michigan	3
3–1	South Carolina	2

International Bracket

—
—	Australia	3
—	Czech Republic	8
—	Taiwan	1
—	Puerto Rico	2
Lower round 1
0–1	Australia	0
1–1	Puerto Rico (F/5)	10
1–1	Czech Republic	0
0–1	Taiwan	2

—
–	Curaçao	8
1–0	Czech Republic	0
–	Canada	11
1–0	Puerto Rico	10
Lower round 2
2–1	Puerto Rico	0
1–1	Taiwan (F/5)	10

—
1–0	Curaçao	5
1–0	Canada	4
Lower final
1–1	Canada	0
2–1	Taiwan (F/5)	14

International Championship
2–0	Curaçao	3
3–1	Taiwan	8

Elimination Round

Semifinals
2–0	Michigan	3
3–1	South Carolina	2
2–0	Curaçao	3
3–1	Taiwan	8

World Championship
3–0	Michigan	0
4–1	Taiwan	6

2023 Junior League World Series Champions
Tao-Yuan LL
Taoyuan, Taiwan
