= 2014 Junior League World Series =

International children's baseball competition

Tournament information
- Location: Taylor, Michigan
- Dates: August 9–16

Final positions
- Champions: Taichung, Taiwan
- Runner-up: Corpus Christi, Texas

The 2014 Junior League World Series took place from August 9–16 in Taylor, Michigan, United States. Taichung, Taiwan defeated Corpus Christi, Texas in the championship game. It was Taiwan's second straight championship.

== Teams ==
United States	International
Midland, Michigan; Northeast/Fraternal Northwest; Central	Taichung, Taiwan; Chung Shan; Asia–Pacific
Newark, Delaware; Newark National; East	Regina, Saskatchewan; North Regina; Canada
Rutherfordton, North Carolina; Rutherfordton; Southeast	Brno, Czech Republic; South Moravia; Europe–Africa
Corpus Christi, Texas; Oil Belt; Southwest	Willemstad, Curaçao; Pariba; Latin America
Manhattan Beach, California; Manhattan/Hermosa Beach; West	Mexicali, Baja California; Felix Arce; Mexico

== Results ==
United States Pool

Team	W	L	Rs	Ra
Texas	3	1	26	28
California	3	1	33	23
North Carolina	2	2	29	19
Michigan	1	3	12	22
Delaware	1	3	13	21

	(California)	(Delaware)	(Michigan)	(North Carolina)	(Texas)
California	–	10–0	9–6	8–7	6–10
Delaware	0–10	–	2–4	7–1	4–6
Michigan	6–9	4–2	–	1–4	1–7
North Carolina	7–8	1–7	4–1	–	17–3
Texas	10–6	6–4	7–1	3–17	–

International Pool

Team	W	L	Rs	Ra
Taiwan	4	0	38	2
Curaçao	2	2	30	14
Mexico	2	2	23	16
Canada	2	2	30	39
Czech Republic	0	4	14	64

	(Canada)	(Curaçao)	(Czech Republic)	(Mexico)	(Taiwan)
Canada	–	3–4^{(9)}	20–11	7–6	0–18
Curaçao	4–3^{(9)}	–	20–2	4–6	2–3
Czech Republic	11–20	2–20	–	1–11	0–13
Mexico	6–7	6–4	11–1	–	0–4
Taiwan	18–0	3–2	13–0	4–0	–

Elimination Round

Semifinals
3–1	Texas	4
3–1	California	2
4–0	Taiwan	10
2–2	Curaçao	2

World Championship
4–1	Texas	1
5–0	Taiwan	9

2014 Junior League World Series Champions
Chung Shan LL
Taichung, Taiwan

== Notable players ==
- Gu Lin Ruei-yang of the Taichung team later played in the Chinese Professional Baseball League and Nippon Professional Baseball. First appearance in the tournament.
