= Pearl City, Hawaii =

Census-designated place in Hawaii, United States

- Unincorporated community
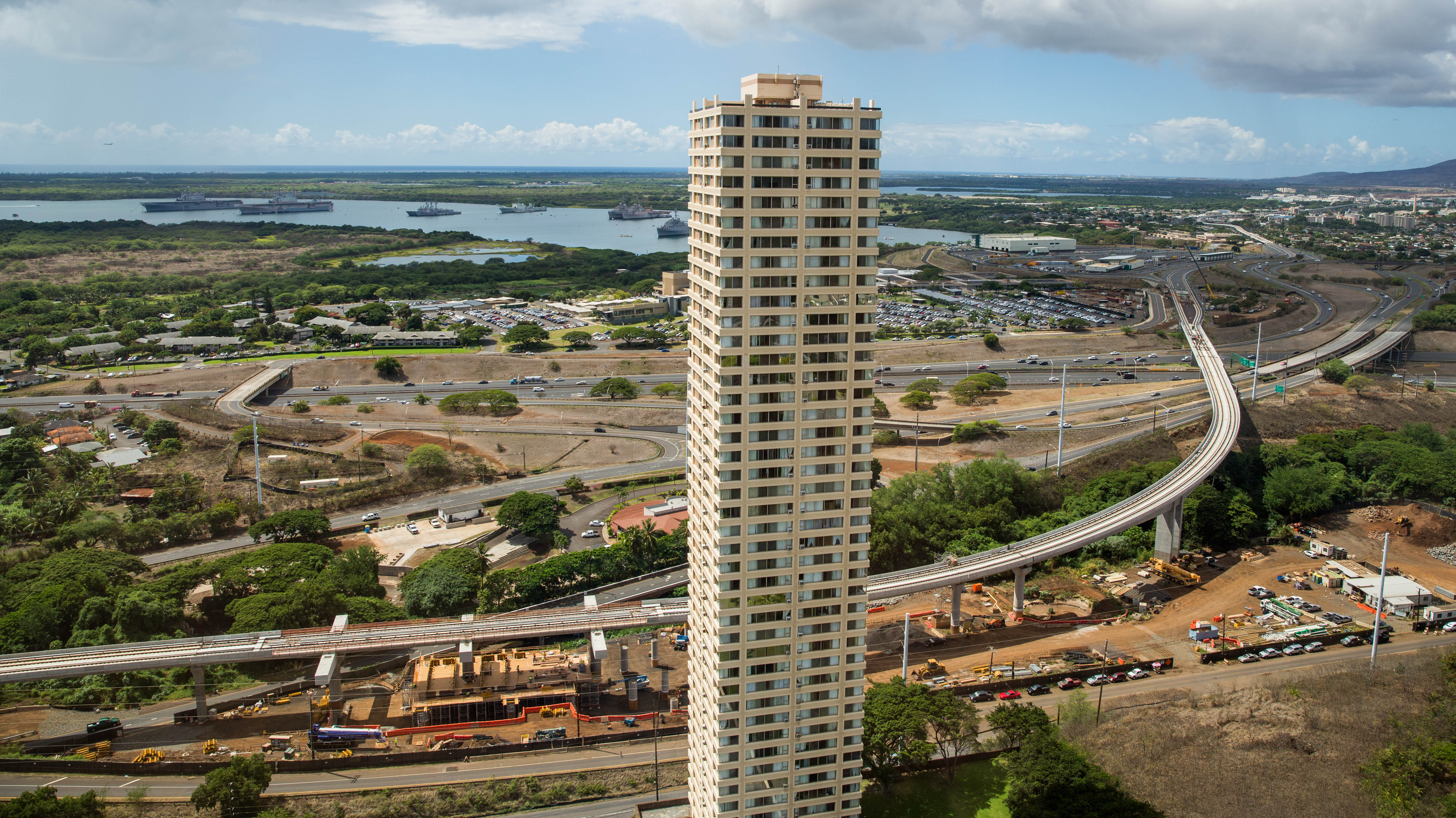
- Pearl City

- Location in Honolulu County and the state of Hawaii

- Location in Hawaii
- Coordinates: 21°24′30″N 157°58′1″W
- Country: United States
- State: Hawaii
- County: Honolulu

Area
  - Total: 10.06 sq mi (26.05 km^{2})
  - Land: 9.12 sq mi (23.62 km^{2})
  - Water: 0.93 sq mi (2.42 km^{2})
- Elevation: 89 ft (27 m)

Population (2020)
  - Total: 45,295
  - Density: 4,966.6/sq mi (1,917.62/km^{2})
- Time zone: UTC−10:00 (Hawaii-Aleutian)
- ZIP Code: 96782
- Area code: 808
- FIPS code: 15-62600
- GNIS feature ID: 0363226

Pearl City is an unincorporated community and census-designated place (CDP) in the ʻEwa District and City & County of Honolulu on the island of Oʻahu, in the U.S. state of Hawaii. As of the 2020 census, the CDP had a population of 45,295. Pearl City sits along the north shore of Pearl Harbor. Waimalu borders Pearl City to the east and Waipahu borders the west. The U.S. postal code for Pearl City is 96782.

== History ==
Early-day Pearl City had an array of rice paddies and fields that were plowed by water buffalo that hauled a 9 two-wheeled cart. In the early 1880s, Pearl City was the final stop for Benjamin Franklin Dillingham's Oahu Railway, a mud wagon driven by a four-horse team. Lots for a yet-to-exist "Pearl City" went on sale in 1889, after completion of the rail line. Near the outskirts of Pearl City, the Remond Grove, an area where people were entertained by piano, banjo, trumpet, and saxophone performances, was a popular entertainment spot in the early 1900s.

== Geography ==
Pearl City is located at 21°24'30" North, 157°58'1" East (21.408333, −157.966902).

According to the United States Census Bureau, the CDP has an area of 5.8 square miles (15 km^{2}), of which 5.0 square miles (13 km^{2}) is land and 0.8 square miles (2.1 km^{2}) is water. The total area is 14.29% water.

- Average winter high (January 28): 79 degrees
- Average winter low (January 28): 66 degrees
- Average summer high (August 23): 87 degrees
- Average summer low (August 23): 74 degrees
- Average annual precipitation: 64 inches

== Demographics ==
Historical population
Census	Pop.	Note	%±
1970	19,552		—
1980	42,575		117.8%
1990	30,993		−27.2%
2000	30,976		−0.1%
2010	47,698		54.0%
2020	45,295		−5.0%
U.S. Decennial Census; 1790–1960 1900–1990; 1990–2000 2010–2015

=== 2020 census ===
As of the 2020 census, Pearl City had a population of 45,295. The median age was 45.7 years. 18.5% of residents were under the age of 18 and 26.1% were 65 years of age or older. For every 100 females there were 97.7 males, and for every 100 females age 18 and over there were 96.0 males age 18 and over.

100.0% of residents lived in urban areas.

There were 15,171 households in Pearl City, of which 30.2% had children under the age of 18 living in them. Of all households, 54.0% were married-couple households, 17.0% were households with a male householder and no spouse or partner present, and 23.9% were households with a female householder and no spouse or partner present. About 20.4% of all households were made up of individuals and 10.9% had someone living alone who was 65 years of age or older.

There were 15,891 housing units, of which 4.5% were vacant. The homeowner vacancy rate was 0.5% and the rental vacancy rate was 6.1%.

Racial composition as of the 2020 census
Race	Number	Percent
White	4,225	9.3%
Black or African American	785	1.7%
American Indian and Alaska Native	69	0.2%
Asian	25,169	55.6%
Native Hawaiian and Other Pacific Islander	3,245	7.2%
Some other race	622	1.4%
Two or more races	11,180	24.7%
Hispanic or Latino (of any race)	3,681	8.1%

=== 2000 census ===
As of the 2000 census, there were 8,922 households, of which 25.2% had children under the age of 18 living with them, 63.9% were married couples living together, 12.3% had a female householder with no husband present, and 18.3% were non-families. 14.9% of all households were made up of individuals, and 6.6% had someone living alone who was 65 years of age or older. The average household size was 3.17 and the average family size was 3.48.

In the CDP, 18.8% of the population was under the age of 18, 13.7% was from 18 to 24, 27.2% from 25 to 44, 23.2% from 45 to 64, and 17.1% was 65 years of age or older. The median age was 37. For every 100 females, there were 115.2 males. For every 100 females age 18 and over, there were 117.3 males.

The median income for a household in the CDP was $62,036, and the median income for a family was $67,246. Males had a median income of $30,712 versus $28,408 for females. The per capita income was $21,683. 6.2% of the population and 4.0% of families were below the poverty line. Of the total population, 11.7% of those under the age of 18 and 4.1% of those 65 and older were living below the poverty line.

== Government and infrastructure ==
The Honolulu Police Department operates the Pearl City Substation in Pearl City.

The United States Postal Service operates the Pearl City Post Office in Pearl City.

== Education ==
The Hawai'i Department of Education operates public schools in Pearl City, including the Pearl City Complex public schools that include elementary, intermediate, and high schools.

Elementary schools in the CDP include Manana, Momilani, Palisades, Pearl City, Pearl City Highlands, Waimalu, and Waiau. Two secondary schools, Highlands Intermediate School and Pearl City High School, are also in the CDP. Momilani, Waimalu, and Waiau elementary schools and Pearl City High were in the Waimalu CDP as of the 2000 U.S. census, but as of the 2010 U.S. census are in the Pearl City CDP.

The Roman Catholic Diocese of Honolulu operates Our Lady of Good Counsel School in the CDP, which opened in 1964.

Leeward Community College, a branch of the University of Hawaiʻi System, is adjacent to the CDP, with a Pearl City address.

Hawaii State Public Library System operates the Pearl City Library. Originally known as the Pearl City Regional Library, it began operations on November 15, 1969.

== Sports and recreation ==
In 1988, a Pearl City baseball team—Pearl City Little League (District 7)—represented the U.S. and made it to the Little League World Series World Championship game, where it lost to the team from Taiwan. In 2007, it won the Junior League World Series, after winning the West Region, then defeating the Central Region and Southwest Region champions to become the U.S. champion, and finally defeating the International champion (Asia-Pacific Region), Illam Central LL (Makati, Philippines), 6–2.

The Hawaii Hawks won the 2003 Field Hockey World Cup 10–7.

In 2017, a Pearl City youth baseball team, the Pearl City KRU, represented the Pacific Southwest region in the Cal Ripken Baseball 10U (age 10 and under) World Series. This series was held in Hammond, Indiana, which hosted nine other teams from across the country. The KRU team won all of its games in pool play, and made it to the World Series finals, where they lost to the team from West Raleigh, North Carolina, 5–3.

== Notable people ==
- Brook Lee, Miss Hawaii USA 1997, Miss USA 1997 and Miss Universe 1997
- Jason Scott Lee, film actor
- Duke Aiona, lieutenant governor of Hawaii, born in Pearl City
- David Ige, governor of Hawaii, born in Pearl City
- Verena Mei, model and rally driver
- Jordan Ta'amu, professional football player
- Jordan Yamamoto, Major League Baseball player
