= 1986 PBA Tour season =

PBA Bowling Tour: 1986 Season
- League: Professional Bowlers Association
- Sport: Ten-pin bowling
- Duration: January 6 – December 6, 1986

PBA Tour
- Season MVP: Walter Ray Williams, Jr.

PBA Tour seasons
- ← 1985 1987 →

This is a recap of the 1986 season for the Professional Bowlers Association (PBA) Tour. It was the tour's 28th season, and consisted of 32 events. Walter Ray Williams, Jr. won his first three PBA titles on the season, and also won the player vote for the PBA Player of the Year award. This despite the fact that Steve Cook won four titles, including a major at the BPAA U.S. Open. Newcomer Tom Crites took the title at the Toledo Trust PBA National Championship.

In winning his second career Firestone Tournament of Champions ten years after his first, Marshall Holman won the highest single prize check in PBA history to date ($50,000) and also became just the third player to top the $1 million mark in career earnings (joining Earl Anthony and Mark Roth). The win also gave Holman his fourth career major among his 20 total titles.

Late in the season at the Brunswick Memorial World Open, George Branham III made history by becoming the first African American to win a national PBA Tour title.

== Tournament schedule ==
Event	Bowling center	City	Dates	Winner
AC-Delco Classic	Union Square Lanes	Union City, California	Jan 6–11	Randy Pedersen (1)
Greater Los Angeles Open	Gable House Bowl	Torrance, California	Jan 13–18	Del Warren (1)
Showboat Invitational	Showboat Bowling Center	Las Vegas, Nevada	Jan 19–25	Gary Skidmore (6)
Quaker State Open	Forum Bowling Lanes	Grand Prairie, Texas	Jan 25 – Feb 1	Jon O'Drobinak (1)
Lite Beer Classic	Don Carter's Kendall Lanes	Miami, Florida	Feb 3–8	David Ozio (3)
BPAA U.S. Open	Galaxy Lanes	Venice, Florida	Feb 9–15	Steve Cook (9)
St. Louis Open	North Oaks Bowl	St. Louis, Missouri	Feb 17–22	Pete Weber (8)
Lite Beer Championship	Red Carpet Celebrity Lanes	Milwaukee, Wisconsin	Feb 24 – Mar 1	Don Genalo (5)
True Value Open	Landmark Plaza Recreation Center	Peoria, Illinois	Mar 4–8	Walter Ray Williams, Jr. (1)
King Louie Open	King Louie West Lanes	Overland Park, Kansas	Mar 11–15	Mark Baker (2)
Lite Beer Open	Buckeye Lanes	North Olmsted, Ohio	Mar 17–22	Mal Acosta (4)
Toledo Trust PBA National Championship	Imperial Lanes	Toledo, Ohio	Mar 23–29	Tom Crites (1)
Fair Lanes Open	Fair Lanes Woodlawn	Baltimore, Maryland	Apr 1–5	Walter Ray Williams, Jr. (2)
Long Island Open	Garden City Bowl	Garden City, New York	Apr 8–12	Peter Hakim (1)
Greater Hartford Open	Bradley Bowl	Windsor Locks, Connecticut	Apr 14–19	Steve Cook (10)
Firestone Tournament of Champions	Riviera Lanes	Akron, Ohio	Apr 22–25	Marshall Holman (20)
Showboat Doubles Classic	Showboat Bowling Center	Las Vegas, Nevada	Jun 7–11	Mike Aulby (13), Steve Cook (11)
Kessler Open	Earl Anthony's Dublin Bowl	Dublin, California	Jun 13–18	Dave Husted (4)
Ebonite Firebolt Open	Leilani Lanes	Seattle, Washington	Jun 21–25	Dale Eagle (3)
Southern California Open	Town Square Lanes	Riverside, California	Jun 27 – Jul 2	Mats Karlsson (1)
Miller Lite Challenge	Golden Pin Lanes	Tucson, Arizona	Jul 4–9	Dave Husted (5)
Austin Open	Highland Lanes	Austin, Texas	Jul 11–16	Steve Cook (12)
Hammer Open	Boulevard Bowl	Edmond, Oklahoma	Jul 18–23	Walter Ray Williams, Jr. (3)
Molson Golden Bowling Challenge	Rose Bowl Lanes	Windsor, Ontario	Jul 25–30	Don Genalo (6)
Greater Buffalo Open	Thruway Lanes	Cheektowaga, New York	Aug 1–6	Jeff Bellinger (1)
Columbia Senior/Touring Pro Doubles	Super Bowl Lanes	Erlanger, Kentucky	Aug 9–13	Teata Semiz (4), Joe Berardi (6)
Japan Cup	Tokyo Port Bowl	Tokyo, Japan	Sep 18–22	Pete Weber (9)
Kodak Invitational	Marcel's Olympic Bowl	Rochester, New York	Nov 3–8	Tom Baker (7)
True Value Open	Woodland Bowl	Indianapolis, Indiana	Nov 10–15	Harry Sullins (1)
Brunswick Memorial World Open	Brunswick Northern Bowl	Glendale Heights, Illinois	Nov 15–22	George Branham III (1)
Budweiser Classic	Columbus Square Bowling Palace	Columbus, Ohio	Nov 24–29	Dave Ferraro (1)
Budweiser Touring Players Championship	Taylor Lanes	Taylor, Michigan	Dec 1–6	Mark Williams (4)
