= 1988 PBA Tour season =

PBA Bowling Tour: 1988 Season
- League: Professional Bowlers Association
- Sport: Ten-pin bowling
- Duration: December 29, 1987 – December 3, 1988

PBA Tour
- Season MVP: Brian Voss

PBA Tour seasons
- ← 1987 1989 →

This is a recap of the 1988 season for the Professional Bowlers Association (PBA) Tour. It was the tour's 30th season, and consisted of 35 events.

Brian Voss won two titles on the season, including his first major at the Trustcorp PBA National Championship. Voss also set a single-season earnings record ($225,485) and was crowned PBA Player of the Year.

Mark Williams earned his second Firestone Tournament of Champions title, having also won the event in 1985. Pete Weber took home the trophy and $100,000 first prize in the Seagram's Coolers U.S. Open.

Bob Benoit, in his very first TV finals appearance, rolled the PBA's fifth televised 300 game in winning the Quaker State Open. It was the PBA Tour's first televised 300 game that was shot in the final championship match.

== Tournament schedule ==
Event	Bowling center	City	Dates	Winner
ARC Alameda Open	Mel's Southshore Bowl	Alameda, California	Dec 29 – Jan 2	Mike Jasnau (1)
Showboat Invitational	Showboat Bowling Center	Las Vegas, Nevada	Jan 3–9	Amleto Monacelli (2)
AC-Delco Classic	Gable House Bowl	Torrance, California	Jan 11–16	Joe Berardi (7)
Quaker State Open	Forum Bowling Lanes	Grand Prairie, Texas	Jan 18–23	Bob Benoit (1)
Don Carter's Greater New Orleans Classic	Don Carter's All-Star Lanes	Harvey, Louisiana	Jan 25–30	Roger Bowker (1)
Bowler's Journal Florida Open	Galaxy Lanes	Venice, Florida	Feb 1–6	Marshall Holman (21)
Miller Lite Classic	Don Carter's Kendall Lanes	Miami, Florida	Feb 8–13	Tom Milton (5)
Miller Lite Open	Buckeye Lanes	North Olmsted, Ohio	Feb 29 – Mar 5	Mike Aulby (14)
Trustcorp PBA National Championship	Imperial Lanes	Toledo, Ohio	Mar 6–12	Brian Voss (5)
King Louie Open	King Louie West Lanes	Overland Park, Kansas	Mar 14–19	Palmer Fallgren (3)
True Value Open	Landmark Plaza Recreation Center	Peoria, Illinois	Mar 21–26	Brian Voss (6)
Lite Beer Championship	Red Carpet Celebrity Lanes	Milwaukee, Wisconsin	Mar 28 – Apr 2	Jeff Bellinger (2)
Fair Lanes Open	Towson Fair Lanes	Towson, Maryland	Apr 4–9	Mark Williams (5)
Seagram's Coolers U.S. Open	Atlantic City Showboat Lanes	Atlantic City, New Jersey	Apr 10–16	Pete Weber (11)
Greater Hartford Open	Bradley Bowl	Windsor Locks, Connecticut	Apr 18–23	Tony Westlake (1)
Firestone Tournament of Champions	Riviera Lanes	Akron, Ohio	Apr 26–30	Mark Williams (6)
A & W Pro Bowlers Classic	Fair Lanes Squaw Peak	Phoenix, Arizona	May 16–21	Steve Cook (13)
Fresno Open	Cedar Lanes	Fresno, California	May 23–28	Pete McCordic (1)
Showboat PBA Doubles Classic	Showboat Bowling Center	Las Vegas, Nevada	May 31 – Jun 4	Joe Berardi (8), Dave Ferraro (3)
Kessler Open	Earl Anthony's Dublin Bowl	Dublin, California	Jun 17–22	Bryan Alpert (1)
Seattle Open	Skyway Park Bowl	Seattle, Washington	Jun 24–29	Tom Crites (4)
Miller Lite Challenge	Golden Pin Lanes	Tucson, Arizona	Jul 1–6	Pete McCordic (2)
Kessler Classic	Town Square Lanes	Riverside, California	Jul 8–13	Sam Maccarone (1)
Columbia 300 Open	Highland Lanes	Austin, Texas	Jul 15–20	Scott Devers (3)
Hammer Open	Boulevard Bowl	Edmond, Oklahoma	Jul 22–27	David Ozio (4)
La Mode Classic	Red Carpet Lanes	Green Bay, Wisconsin	Jul 30 – Aug 3	Dave Husted (6)
Molson Golden Bowling Challenge	Rose Bowl Lanes	Windsor, Ontario	Aug 5–10	Sam Maccarone (2)
Senior/Touring Pro Doubles Championship	Thruway Lanes	Cheektowaga, New York	Aug 13–17	Carmen Salvino (17), Randy Pedersen (4)
Number 7 PBA Invitational	Silver Dollar Action Centre	Calgary, Alberta	Sep 16–18	Dave Ferraro (4)
Oronamin C Japan Cup '88	Tokyo Port Bowl	Tokyo, Japan	Oct 6–10	Takeo Sakai (1)
Kodak Invitational	Marcel's Olympic Bowl	Rochester, New York	Oct 24–29	Ron Palombi, Jr. (3)
True Value Open	Woodland Bowl	Indianapolis, Indiana	Nov 7–12	Joe Berardi (9)
Brunswick Memorial World Open	Brunswick Northern Bowl	Glendale Heights, Illinois	Nov 13–19	Mats Karlsson (3)
Budweiser Classic	Columbus Square Bowling Palace	Columbus, Ohio	Nov 21–26	Ron Williams (1)
Budweiser Touring Players Championship	Taylor Lanes	Taylor, Michigan	Nov 28 – Dec 3	Dave Ferraro (5)
