= 1987 PBA Tour season =

PBA Bowling Tour: 1987 Season
- League: Professional Bowlers Association
- Sport: Ten-pin bowling
- Duration: January 4 – December 5, 1987

PBA Tour
- Season MVP: Marshall Holman

PBA Tour seasons
- ← 1986 1988 →

This is a recap of the 1987 season for the Professional Bowlers Association (PBA) Tour. It was the tour's 29th season, and consisted of 33 events.

Del Ballard, Jr. won his first PBA title at the historic U.S. Open sponsored this season by Seagram's Coolers. The tourney offered a $500,000 prize fund and $100,000 first prize—both PBA records. Even Pete Weber's second place check of $55,000 in this event was higher than the previous record first prize of $50,000 set in 1986.

Randy Pedersen took the title in the Toledo Trust PBA National Championship. At the Firestone Tournament of Champions, defending champion Marshall Holman, who held the record for youngest PBA Tour bowler to reach 10 career Tour titles (24 years, 274 days old) had his record broke by just 27 days when Pete Weber won his first PBA Tournament of Champions and became the new youngest bowler (24 years, 247 days old) to reach 10 career titles. As of 2026, Weber and Holman remain the only PBA bowlers to win 10 career Tour titles before their 25th birthday.

While he did not go on to win the tournament, Pete McCordic made history at the Greater Los Angeles Open by firing a 300 game in the opening match of the finals. It was the PBA's fourth-ever nationally televised perfect game, and the first since 1974.

Marshall Holman won the PBA Player of the Year vote despite not winning a title—a PBA first. The 20-time titlist did lead the Tour in average and a few other statistical categories. This record likely will never be broken as the PBA Tour subsequently changed the requirements so only winners are eligible to be on the Player of the Year ballots.

== Tournament schedule ==
Event	Bowling center	City	Dates	Winner
Seagram's Coolers U.S. Open	Narrows Plaza Bowl	Tacoma, Washington	Jan 4–10	Del Ballard, Jr. (1)
AC-Delco Classic	Union Square Lanes	Union City, California	Jan 12–16	George Branham III (2)
Showboat Invitational	Showboat Bowling Center	Las Vegas, Nevada	Jan 18–24	Kent Wagner (1)
Greater Los Angeles Open	Gable House Bowl	Torrance, California	Jan 26–31	Mats Karlsson (2)
Quaker State Open	Forum Bowling Lanes	Grand Prairie, Texas	Feb 2–7	Brian Voss (3)
Lite Beer Classic	Don Carter's Kendall Lanes	Miami, Florida	Feb 9–14	Walter Ray Williams, Jr. (4)
Bowler's Journal Florida Open	Galaxy Lanes	Venice, Florida	Feb 16–21	Jim Murtishaw (1)
True Value Open	Landmark Plaza Recreation Center	Peoria, Illinois	Feb 23–28	John Gant (2)
Lite Beer Championship	Red Carpet Celebrity Lanes	Milwaukee, Wisconsin	Mar 2–7	Tom Milton (4)
King Louie Open	King Louie West Lanes	Overland Park, Kansas	Mar 9–14	Jimmie Pritts, Jr. (3)
Miller Lite Open	Buckeye Lanes	North Olmsted, Ohio	Mar 16–21	Dave Ferraro (2)
Toledo Trust PBA National Championship	Imperial Lanes	Toledo, Ohio	Mar 22–28	Randy Pedersen (2)
Fair Lanes Open	Fair Lanes Capital Plaza	Washington, DC	Mar 30 – Apr 4	Randy Pedersen (3)
Showboat Atlantic City Open	Atlantic City Showboat Lanes	Atlantic City, New Jersey	Apr 6–11	Tom Crites (2)
Greater Hartford Open	Bradley Bowl	Windsor Locks, Connecticut	Apr 13–18	Bob Handley (4)
Firestone Tournament of Champions	Riviera Lanes	Akron, Ohio	Apr 21–25	Pete Weber (10)
Showboat Doubles Classic	Showboat Bowling Center	Las Vegas, Nevada	Jun 6–10	Joe Firpo (1), Del Warren (2)
Kessler Open	Earl Anthony's Dublin Bowl	Dublin, California	Jun 12–17	Mark Baker (3)
Columbia 300 Open	Skyway Park Bowl	Seattle, Washington	Jun 19–24	Parker Bohn III (1)
Southern California Open	Town Square Lanes	Riverside, California	Jun 26 – Jul 1	Brian Voss (4)
Miller Lite Challenge	Golden Pin Lanes	Tucson, Arizona	Jul 3–8	Scott Devers (1)
Austin Open	Westgate Lanes	Austin, Texas	Jul 10–15	Kent Wagner (2)
Hammer Open	Boulevard Bowl	Edmond, Oklahoma	Jul 17–22	Walter Ray Williams, Jr. (5)
Kessler Senior/Touring Pro Doubles	Red Carpet Lanes	Green Bay, Wisconsin	Jul 25–29	Mickey Spiezio (1), Rowdy Morrow (1)
Greater Buffalo Open	Thruway Lanes	Cheektowaga, New York	Jul 31 – Aug 5	Mark Roth (32)
Molson Golden Bowling Challenge	Rose Bowl Lanes	Windsor, Ontario	Aug 7–12	Harry Sullins (2)
Number 7 PBA Invitational	AMF O'Connor Bowl West	Toronto, Ontario	Aug 17-19	Mark Roth (33)
Japan Cup	Tokyo Port Bowl	Tokyo, Japan	Sep 10–14	Amleto Monacelli (1)
Kodak Invitational	Marcel's Olympic Bowl	Rochester, New York	Oct 26–31	Scott Devers (2)
True Value Open	Woodland Bowl	Indianapolis, Indiana	Nov 2–7	Ron Palombi, Jr. (2)
Brunswick Memorial World Open	Brunswick Northern Bowl	Glendale Heights, Illinois	Nov 7–14	Del Ballard, Jr. (2)
Budweiser Classic	Columbus Square Bowling Palace	Columbus, Ohio	Nov 23–28	Leroy Bornhop (1)
Budweiser Touring Players Championship	Taylor Lanes	Taylor, Michigan	Nov 30 – Dec 5	Tom Crites (3)
