= 1983 PBA Tour season =

PBA Bowling Tour: 1983 Season
- League: Professional Bowlers Association
- Sport: Ten-pin bowling
- Duration: January 11 – November 19, 1983

PBA Tour
- Season MVP: Earl Anthony

PBA Tour seasons
- ← 1982 1984 →

This is a recap of the 1983 season for the Professional Bowlers Association (PBA) Tour. It was the tour's 25th season, and consisted of 35 events. Earl Anthony registered his second career "three-peat" at the PBA National Championship, giving him six titles in this event overall. (He had also won the event three years in a row from 1973–75.) Anthony won one more title on the season and collected his sixth career PBA Player of the Year award.

Gary Dickinson won his first PBA major title (eighth overall) at the BPAA U.S. Open, while Joe Berardi was victorious at the Firestone Tournament of Champions.

Norm Duke became the PBA Tour's youngest champion ever (18 years, 345 days) when he won the Cleveland Open on March 5. In his first-ever TV match, Duke defeated the legendary Earl Anthony, then went on to knock off three more previous Tour champions for the title.

== Tournament schedule ==
Event	Bowling center	City	Dates	Winner
Miller High Life Classic	Brunswick Wonderbowl	Anaheim, California	Jan 11–15	Gary Skidmore (2)
AC-Delco Classic	Mel's Southshore Bowl	Alameda, California	Jan 18–22	Toby Contreras (1)
Showboat Invitational	Showboat Bowling Center	Las Vegas, Nevada	Jan 23–29	Tom Milton (1)
Quaker State Open	Forum Bowling Lanes	Grand Prairie, Texas	Feb 1–5	Guppy Troup (6)
Greater Miami Sunshine Open	Bird Bowl	Miami, Florida	Feb 8–12	Wayne Webb (11)
Rolaids Open	Dick Weber Lanes	Florissant, Missouri	Feb 15–19	Joe Salvemini (1)
True Value Open	Landmark Plaza Recreation Center	Peoria, Illinois	Feb 22–26	Earl Anthony (40)
Cleveland Open	Buckeye Lanes	North Olmsted, Ohio	Mar 1–5	Norm Duke (1)
Toledo Trust PBA National Championship	Imperial Lanes	Toledo, Ohio	Mar 6–12	Earl Anthony (41)
King Louie Open	King Louie West Lanes	Overland Park, Kansas	Mar 15–19	Don Genalo (1)
Miller High Life Open	Red Carpet Celebrity Lanes	Milwaukee, Wisconsin	Mar 22–26	Mark Fahy (1)
BPAA U.S. Open	Arena Bowl	Oak Lawn, Illinois	Mar 27 – Apr 2	Gary Dickinson (8)
Greater Hartford Open	Bradley Bowl	Windsor Locks, Connecticut	Apr 5–9	Tom Milton (2)
Fair Lanes Open	Fair Lanes Woodlawn	Baltimore, Maryland	Apr 12–16	Art Trask (4)
Long Island Open	Garden City Bowl	Garden City, New York	Apr 19–23	Don Genalo (2)
Firestone Tournament of Champions	Riviera Lanes	Akron, Ohio	Apr 26–30	Joe Berardi (5)
Houston Open	Big Texan Lanes	Houston, Texas	May 17–21	Bob Handley (3)
Denver Open	Celebrity Sports Center	Denver, Colorado	May 24–28	Tom Milton (3)
Tucson Open	Golden Pin Lanes	Tucson, Arizona	May 31 – Jun 4	Hugh Miller (3)
Southern California Open	Gable House Bowl	Torrance, California	Jun 7–11	Jimmie Pritts, Jr. (1)
Kessler Open	Futurama Bowl	San Jose, California	Jun 14–18	Pete Couture (5)
Seattle Open	Leilani Lanes	Seattle, Washington	Jun 21–25	Charlie Tapp (1)
Showboat Doubles Classic	Showboat Bowling Center	Las Vegas, Nevada	Jul 22–28	Mike Durbin (12), Gil Sliker (1)
Aqua Fest Mr. Gatti's Open	Highland Lanes	Austin, Texas	Jul 29 – Aug 2	Marshall Holman (15)
Venice Open	Galaxy Lanes	Venice, Florida	Aug 5–9	Marshall Holman (16)
Buffalo Open	Thruway Lanes	Cheektowaga, New York	Aug 12–16	Sam Zurich (2)
Molson Bowling Challenge	Rose Bowl Lanes	Windsor, Ontario	Aug 19–23	Dennis Jacques (1)
Waukegan Open	Bertrand Lanes	Waukegan, Illinois	Aug 26–30	Les Zikes (2)
AMF Grand Prix of Ten Pin Bowling	Crawley Bowl	Crawley, England	Sep 21–24	Mats Karlsson (1)
Touring Players Championship	422 Limerick Bowl	Limerick, Pennsylvania	Oct 5–10	Steve Cook (7)
Northern Ohio Open	Westgate Lanes	Rocky River, Ohio	Oct 13–18	Mark Roth (27)
Kessler Classic	Woodland Bowl	Indianapolis, Indiana	Oct 21–25	George Pappas (8)
Greater Detroit Open	Satellite Bowl	Dearborn Heights, Michigan	Oct 28 – Nov 1	Brian Voss (1)
Syracuse Open	Brunswick Holiday Bowl	Syracuse, New York	Nov 4–8	Joe Salvemini (2)
Brunswick Memorial World Open	Brunswick Northern Bowl	Glendale Heights, Illinois	Nov 13–19	Wayne Webb (12)
