= Taylor High School =

Taylor High School may refer to:

United Kingdom

- Taylor High School (New Stevenston), Motherwell, Scotland

United States

- Alief Taylor High School, Harris County, Texas
- Blair–Taylor High School, Blair, Wisconsin
- James E. Taylor High School, Harris County, Texas
- Lake Taylor High School, Norfolk, Virginia
- Richardton–Taylor High School, Richardton, North Dakota
- T. DeWitt Taylor Middle–High School, Pierson, Florida
- Taylor Allderdice High School, Pittsburgh, Pennsylvania
- Taylor County High School (Perry, Florida), Perry, Florida
- Taylor County High School (Butler, Georgia), Butler, Georgia
- Taylor County High School (Campbellsville, Kentucky), Campbellsville, Kentucky
- Taylor High School (Arkansas), Taylor, Arkansas
- Taylor High School (Kokomo, Indiana), Kokomo, Indiana
- Taylor High School (North Bend, Ohio), North Bend, Ohio
- Taylor High School (Taylor, Texas), Taylor, Texas
- Taylor Manor School, Ellicott City, Maryland
- Taylor High School (Michigan), Taylor, Michigan
- Taylor Preparatory High School, Taylor, Michigan
