= Tom Milton =

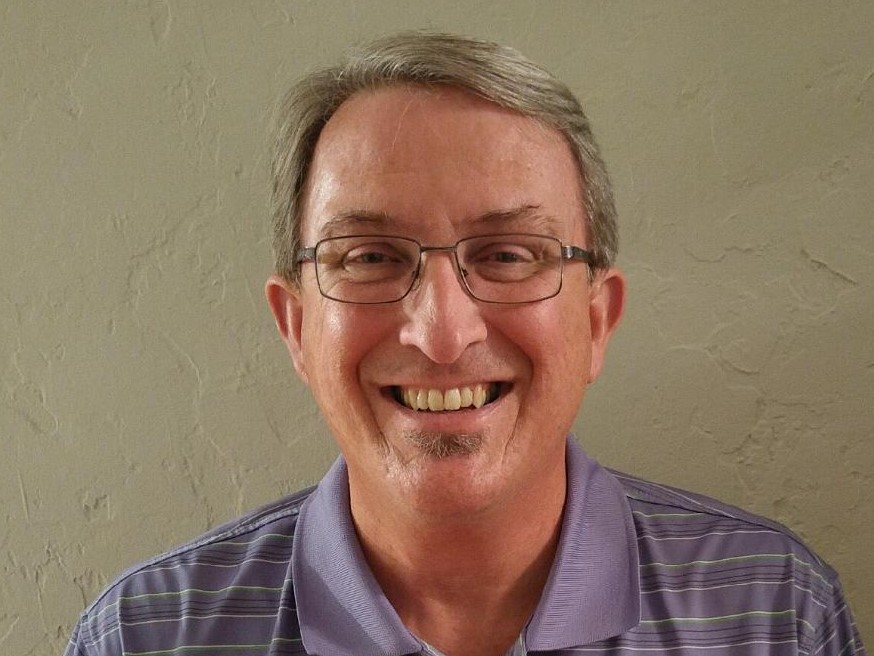
- Born: January 11, 1956; St. Petersburg, Florida
- Occupation: Retired PBA ten-pin bowler
- Years active: 1979–88
- Spouse: Darlene (Harter) Milton (1983-Present)

Tom Milton (January 11, 1956) is a right-handed American professional bowler who amassed 5 National and 6 Regional titles on the Professional Bowlers Association (PBA) Tours.

== Early life ==
Milton was born and raised in St. Petersburg, Florida, to parents Sam (d. 2009) and Tam (d. 2008) Milton, and has two older twin sisters, Tam and Terry. Tom graduated from Lakewood High School and participated in organized baseball and basketball leagues. He initially took an interest in bowling at age 11, joining a Saturday morning Young America Bowling Alliance (YABA) junior league at Skyway Lanes upon being encouraged by Arlene Levine, the desk manager, who was also a certified coach/instructor. Milton continued to develop and hone his bowling skills under Levine's tutelage, garnering many YABA awards throughout his junior career, after which he joined the American Bowling Congress adult division (ABC, now the USBC - United States Bowling Congress). Levine served as one of Tom's key coaches/mentors throughout his bowling career. Two other bowlers that also had an influence on Milton as he developed his game were Earl Ratliff, a local standout at Skyway lanes, known for his steadiness, and PBA Hall of Famer Earl Anthony, for his command of the game through the smooth delivery and efficiency with which he executed each shot. Milton defeated Anthony in a PBA finals match on national television some years later when he claimed his second national title.

In addition to his local bowling accomplishments, prior to his joining the PBA, Milton went on to capture the high conference bowling average while a member of the Hillsborough Community College bowling team. In 1979, he teamed with Pete Brown, also of St. Petersburg, to take second place in the ABC National Classic Championships held in Tampa; they were beaten by the professional Burton brothers tandem (Nelson "Bo" Jr. and Neil). Tom's first thoughts of pursuing a career in professional bowling were the result of having cashed as an amateur in several PBA southern regional tournaments.

== PBA career ==
Milton's first formal PBA tournament as an official PBA cardholder was the AMF Magicscore Open held in Kissimmee, Florida, in February 1978. He secured his first national title in January, 1983 at the Showboat Invitational. Throughout the 1980s Tom was a force to be reckoned with on the lanes, as evidenced by his 5 national titles among 16 top 5 finishes before injuries forced a premature retirement at the conclusion of the 1988 season. The 1988 season proved to be an emotional one as it marked Milton's return to the tour after taking some time off to recover from a nagging injury, culminating in his capturing his fifth and final national title at the Miller Lite Classic tournament held in Miami in February, 1988. Contributing to making it an emotional and most memorable event was that Tom's mother, Tam, was able to attend her first PBA tournament, cheering him onto victory. Unfortunately Tom's wife, Darlene, had to remain at home in St. Petersburg as she was coordinating a local bowling tournament as a memorial tribute to George Litts, Milton's longtime sponsor who had died in 1986. George had been one of Tom's staunchest supporters right from the start who not only employed Tom for a time being, but also served as a mentor and father figure in addition to his sponsorship on the tour. Accordingly, the Litts Memorial Tournament held special added significance to Tom, for in the prior season when Tom won the Miller Lite Open, upon Darlene joining him on the lanes prior to his post victory interview, she revealed to Tom that George's wife had previously advised Darlene that it was George's position that Tom was no longer required to split his winnings with his sponsor, making it all the sweeter as this was the largest winning purse of his career at $39,000. As a result, although Tom's PBA career was cut short, the one-year period between the Lite Beer Championship in Milwaukee and his final tour victory at the Miller Lite Classic Miami Open in 1988 served as the pinnacle of his career.

Milton was the first bowler from the Tampa Bay area to win a PBA national bowling title, after which several other notable Tampa Bay bowlers matched his feat, including Steve Hoskins, Tom Crites, and Tom Daugherty, thereby solidifying the Tampa Bay area's reputation for churning out top caliber bowlers. In addition to his national accomplishments, Milton also has 6 PBA regional titles to his credit, the most recent as of 2007 as a Senior PBA member, winning the Liberty Lanes Regional before a hometown audience.

== PBA National Tournament individual titles ==
Event	Opponent	City	Dates	Winner
Showboat Invitational	Don Genalo	Las Vegas, Nevada	Jan 29, 1983	Tom Milton (1)
Greater Hartford Open	Earl Anthony	Windsor Locks, Connecticut	Apr 9, 1983	Tom Milton (2)
Denver Open	Steve Cook	Denver, Colorado	May 28, 1983	Tom Milton (3)
Lite Beer Championship	Randy Lightfoot	Milwaukee, Wisconsin	Mar 7, 1987	Tom Milton (4)
Miller Lite Classic	Rick Steelsmith	Miami, Florida	Feb 13, 1988	Tom Milton (5)

== PBA National Tournament second-place finishes ==
Event	Winner	City	Dates	2nd Place
Cleveland Open	Norm Duke	North Olmstead, Ohio	Mar 5, 1983	Tom Milton
Greater Hartford Open	Jimmie Pritts Jr.	Windsor Locks, Connecticut	Apr 14, 1984	Tom Milton
Showboat PBA Doubles Classic	Mike Aulby/Steve Cook	Las Vegas, Nevada	Jul 1, 1985	Tom Milton/Jeff Bellinger
Molson Golden Bowling Challenge	Don Genalo	Windsor, Ontario, Canada	Jul 30, 1986	Tom Milton

== Post-tour life ==
Milton utilized his overall bowling knowledge and experience to operate his own Pro Shop for a time period, then ultimately managing several local bowling centers for many years. Milton still participates in local leagues and tournaments as well as participating each year in the USBC National Open Championships. He has averaged as high as 240 in local leagues, and has won a variety of local tournament sweeper events as well as typically cashing in the USBC National Championships. Tom and Darlene's daughter, Katie, was born in May 1991.

== Bowling awards and recognition ==
- First Team All-American (1983)
- Runner-up to Pete Weber for PBA National Tour Rookie of the Year (1983)
- 1983 PBA 3rd Leading Money Winner - Just shy of esteemed rare $100,000 threshold at that time
- Second Team All American (1987)
- 2nd Place - ABC (American Bowling Congress) National Classic Division Doubles with Pete Brown (1979)
- 4th Place - USBC (United States Bowling Conference) Open Doubles with Dave Taylor (2010)
- Gulf Coast/St. Petersburg USBC Hall of Fame (1983)
- Florida State Bowling Associate Hall of Fame (2012)
- 1st Sanctioned 800 Series recorded in St. Petersburg Bowling Association and Tampa Bay area (November, 1978)
- Member of Several Successful Winning Area World Team Challenges, Participated in Grand World Team Championships

== See also ==
- PBA Bowling Tour: 1983 Season
- PBA Bowling Tour: 1987 Season
- PBA Bowling Tour: 1988 Season
