= Taylor Preparatory High School =

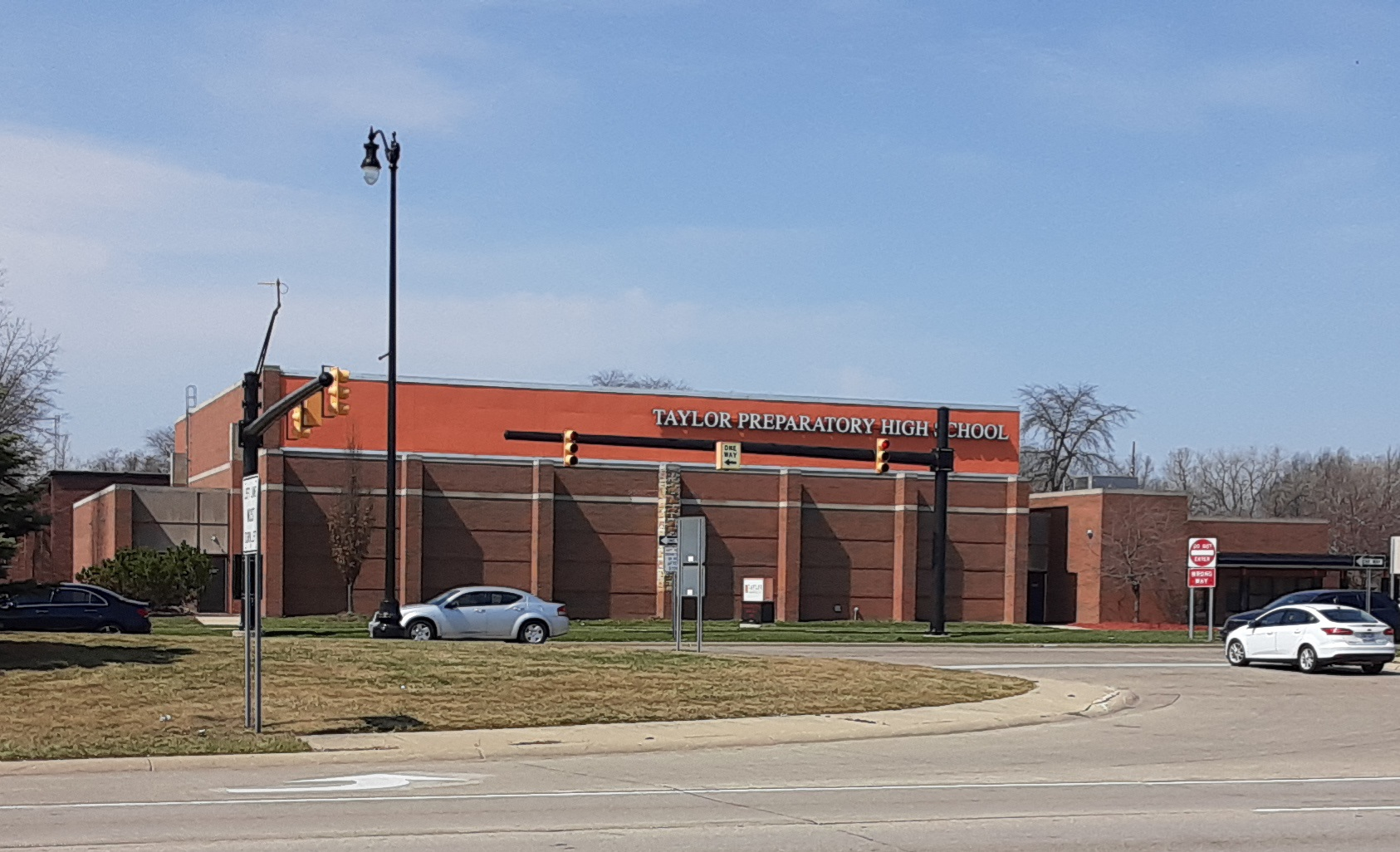
- Image of the school in 2021

Location
- 9540 Telegraph Road; Taylor, Michigan 48180; United States; 42°14′16″N 83°16′16″W

Information
- School type: Charter School, college preparatory
- Established: 2013
- Principal: Alaina Dwyer
- Faculty: 22.47 (on FTE basis)
- Grades: 9 to 12
- Enrollment: 433 (2018–19)
- Student to teacher ratio: 19.27
- Colors: Black; Orange
- Athletics: MHSAA Class B
- Athletics conference: Metro Athletic Conference
- Nickname: Tigers
- Yearbook: Tiger
- Website: www.nhaschools.com/schools/taylor-prep-high-school/en

Taylor Preparatory High School or for short, Taylor Prep is a charter high school located in Taylor, Michigan in Metro Detroit serving grades 9-12th. It has 422 students. It was announced in early 2013 by PrepNet schools after the closed St. Alfred Catholic School was sold by the Archdiocese of Detroit to the company after the elementary was closed in 2011. The school was opened in fall of 2013 under the leadership of Aquan Miles as the schools principal. As of late 2020, the school is now owned and operated by National Heritage Academies.

As of fall of 2019 the school offers an early college program in partnership with the Wayne County Community College District.

== History ==
Taylor Preparatory High School was opened in fall of 2013 by PrepNet schools. The school was founded after the St. Alfred Catholic School was closed in 2011 and the building was later sold in 2013 by the Archdiocese of Detroit after being operational since 1946. After the building was sold the hallways connecting to the main church hall of St. Alfred Catholic Church were walled off; however, the two buildings remain structurally attached.

PrepNet has since merged with National Heritage Academies in late 2020. Taylor Prep is now owned operated by National Heritage Academies.

== Athletics ==
The following sports are offered at Taylor Prep. Unless noted there are teams for both sexes:

- Baseball (boys)
- Basketball
- Cross Country
- Soccer
- Softball (girls)
- Volleyball (girls)

== Clubs ==
- Ladies FIRST
- REAL Men
- Spanish Club
- Drama Club
- D&D Club
- Jam Club

== Organizations ==
- Homecoming
- Prom
- Student Council
- Yearbook
- National Honor Society
- Newspaper

== See also ==
- National Heritage Academies
- Arbor Preparatory High School
- Wellspring Preparatory High School
