= 1984 PBA Tour season =

PBA Bowling Tour: 1984 Season
- League: Professional Bowlers Association
- Sport: Ten-pin bowling
- Duration: January 2 – December 1, 1984

PBA Tour
- Season MVP: Mark Roth

PBA Tour seasons
- ← 1983 1985 →

This is a recap of the 1984 season for the Professional Bowlers Association (PBA) Tour. It was the tour's 26th season, and consisted of 34 events. With Earl Anthony now retired, it was the bowler with the second-highest career wins, Mark Roth, who stepped up to take his fourth PBA Player of the Year honor. Roth won four titles in 1984, upping his career title count to 31 (second to Anthony's 41), and won his first major title at the BPAA U.S. Open. Roth had previously qualified for the TV finals in ten major championships without winning. Adding to his accolades, Roth also became the PBA's second career millionaire (after Anthony) when he took the title at the Greater Detroit Open, and he capped the season by winning the Angle Touring Players Championship.

Bob Chamberlain, a 35-year-old who had toiled on and off the PBA Tour (mostly off) and had recently returned from treatment for alcoholism, won his first ever PBA Tour event at the Toledo Trust PBA National Championship. Meanwhile, Mike Durbin became the first three-time winner in the Firestone Tournament of Champions, having previously won in 1972 and 1982.

Nelson Burton Jr. broke a 12-year-old record for a four-game TV series when he toppled 1,050 pins en route to the title at the AMF Angle Open.

== Tournament schedule ==
| Event | Bowling center | City | Dates | Winner |
|---|---|---|---|---|
| Rolaids Open | Brunswick Wonderbowl | Anaheim, California | Jan 2–7 | Wayne Webb (13) |
| AC-Delco Classic | Mel's Southshore Bowl | Alameda, California | Jan 9–14 | Butch Soper (2) |
| Showboat Invitational | Showboat Bowling Center | Las Vegas, Nevada | Jan 15–21 | George Pappas (9) |
| Quaker State Open | Forum Bowling Lanes | Grand Prairie, Texas | Jan 23–28 | Hugh Miller (4) |
| Miller High Life Classic | Don Carter's Kendall Lanes | Miami, Florida | Jan 30 – Feb 4 | Mark Baker (1) |
| AMF Angle Open | Dick Weber Lanes | Florissant, Missouri | Feb 6–11 | Nelson Burton Jr. (17) |
| True Value Open | Landmark Plaza Recreation Center | Peoria, Illinois | Feb 13–18 | Ted Hannahs (2) |
| Meister Brau Open | Buckeye Lanes | North Olmsted, Ohio | Feb 20–25 | Rickie Sajek (1) |
| Toledo Trust PBA National Championship | Imperial Lanes | Toledo, Ohio | Feb 26 – Mar 3 | Bob Chamberlain (1) |
| King Louie Open | King Louie West Lanes | Overland Park, Kansas | Mar 5–10 | Gary Skidmore (3) |
| BPAA U.S. Open | Arena Bowl | Oak Lawn, Illinois | Mar 12–17 | Mark Roth (28) |
| Miller High Life Open | Red Carpet Celebrity Lanes | Milwaukee, Wisconsin | Mar 19–24 | Rickie Sajek (2) |
| Fair Lanes Open | Fair Lanes Capital Plaza | Hyattsville, Maryland | Mar 27–31 | Dale Eagle (2) |
| Long Island Open | Garden City Bowl | Garden City, New York | Apr 2–7 | Ernie Schlegel (3) |
| Greater Hartford Open | Bradley Bowl | Windsor Locks, Connecticut | Apr 9–14 | Jimmie Pritts Jr. (2) |
| Firestone Tournament of Champions | Riviera Lanes | Akron, Ohio | Apr 17–21 | Mike Durbin (13) |
| Seattle Open | Leilani Lanes | Seattle, Washington | May 14–19 | Don Genalo (3) |
| Denver Open | Celebrity Sports Center | Denver, Colorado | May 22–26 | John Gant (1) |
| Tucson Open | Golden Pin Lanes | Tucson, Arizona | May 29 – Jun 2 | Ron Palombi Jr. (1) |
| Southern California Open | Active West Town Square Lanes | Riverside, California | Jun 5–9 | Gary Skidmore (4) |
| Kessler Open | Earl Anthony's Dublin Bowl | Dublin, California | Jun 12–16 | Wayne Webb (14) |
| Showboat Doubles Classic | Showboat Bowling Center | Las Vegas, Nevada | Jun 19–23 | Mark Roth (29), Marshall Holman (17) |
| Aqua Fest Mr. Gatti's Open | Highland Lanes | Austin, Texas | Jul 19–24 | Pete Weber (3) |
| Houston Open | Copperfield Bowl | Houston, Texas | Jul 26–31 | Brian Voss (2) |
| Waukegan Open | Bertrand Lanes | Waukegan, Illinois | Aug 3–7 | Mark Williams (1) |
| Buffalo Open | Suburban Lanes | Buffalo, New York | Aug 10–14 | George Pappas (10) |
| Molson Golden Bowling Challenge | Rose Bowl Lanes | Windsor, Ontario | Aug 17–21 | Pete Weber (4) |
| Columbia Senior/Touring Pro Doubles | Ponderosa Bowl | San Antonio, Texas | Oct 16–20 | Louis Blancarte, John Forst (1) |
| Indianapolis Open | Woodland Bowl | Indianapolis, Indiana | Oct 23–27 | Mike Aulby (5) |
| True Value Open | Westgate Lanes | Fairview Park, Ohio | Oct 30 – Nov 3 | Charlie Lacy (1) |
| Greater Detroit Open | Satellite Bowl | Dearborn Heights, Michigan | Nov 6–10 | Mark Roth (30) |
| Brunswick Memorial World Open | Brunswick Northern Bowl | Glendale Heights, Illinois | Nov 11–14 | Mike Aulby (6) |
| Budweiser Classic | Columbus Square Bowling Palace | Columbus, Ohio | Nov 19–24 | Guppy Troup (7) |
| Angle Touring Players Championship | George Pappas' Park Lanes | Charlotte, North Carolina | Nov 27 – Dec 1 | Mark Roth (31) |
