= Arbor Preparatory High School =

Secondary school in Ypsilanti, Michigan, United States

Coordinates: 42.1886°N 83.6222°W

Location
- 6800 Hitchingham Rd; Ypsilanti, Michigan 48197; United States

Information
- School type: public, charter high school
- Motto: A Bridge to a Life Well Lived
- School district: PrepNet
- Principal: Travis Batt
- Grades: 9-12
- Enrollment: 411 (2014-2015)
- Colors: Green and White
- Mascot: Gators

Student assessments
- 2021–22 school year Change vs. prior year

M-STEP 11th grade proficiency rates (Science / Social Studies)
- Advanced %: 18.2 / 13.6
- Proficient %: 29.5 / 27.3
- PR. Proficient %: 11.4 / 47.7
- Not Proficient %: 40.9 / 11.4

Average test scores
- SAT Total: 947.5 (▲ +10.9)

Arbor Preparatory High School, or for short, Arbor Prep is a public, charter high school located in Ypsilanti. Arbor Preparatory High School is a comprehensive high school serving 9-12th grades. It has 285 students and 40 faculty members. The building's construction was finished in 2011, and opened the same year. As of late 2020, the school is now owned and operated by National Heritage Academies.

== See also ==
- National Heritage Academies
- Taylor Preparatory High School
- Wellspring Preparatory High School
