= Miriam Frank =

American LGBTQ+ and labor historian

Miriam Frank is an American historian of LGBTQ and labor history, best known for her book Out in the Union: A Labor History of Queer America.

== Early life ==
Miriam Frank was born on 26 February 1947 in New York City. She grew up in Newark, New Jersey.

== Career ==
Miriam Frank's work focuses on the intersection of labor and LGBTQ+ history.

She began teaching in Detroit at Wayne County Community College in the 1970s before moving to New York City in the 1980s to teach at New York University until her retirement from full-time teaching in 2014 at the age of 67.

Starting in 1994, she began interviewing gay and lesbian union members as part of the project that would become her book, Out in the Union: A Labor History of Queer America. She completed 79 interviews between 1994 and 2009, which reside at NYU's Tamiment Library and Robert F. Wagner Labor Archives.

In 1990 she also published, alongside Desma Holcomb, Pride at Work: Organizing for Gay and Lesbian Rights in Unions, a guide for gay unionists to advocate for themselves in the workplace.

== Publications ==
- Pride at Work: Organizing for Gay and Lesbian Rights in Unions (with Desma Holcomb), Lesbian and Gay Labor Network, 1990.
- Out in the Union: A Labor History of Queer America, Temple University Press, 2014.
