= 1985 PBA Tour season =

PBA Bowling Tour: 1985 Season
- League: Professional Bowlers Association
- Sport: Ten-pin bowling
- Duration: January 7 – December 7, 1985

PBA Tour
- Season MVP: Mike Aulby

PBA Tour seasons
- ← 1984 1986 →

This is a recap of the 1985 season for the Professional Bowlers Association (PBA) Tour. It was the tour's 27th season, and consisted of 34 events. Mike Aulby had to defeat his brother-in-law, Steve Cook, in the final match to take the title in the Toledo Trust PBA National Championship. This was just one of six titles that Aulby won on the season, earning him 1985 PBA Player of the Year honors. Aulby also became the first PBA Player to ever cash more than $200,000 in season earnings, as he took home $201,200 on the year.

Marshall Holman became the first multiple winner of the modern-day BPAA U.S. Open. He had also won this event in 1981. Mark Williams made his first appearance in the Firestone Tournament of Champions, and took the title for his first major.

Even though he did not win a title in 1985, Mark Baker won the George Young High Average award (213.72)

== Tournament schedule ==
Event	Bowling center	City	Dates	Winner
AC-Delco Classic	Union Square Lanes	Union City, California	Dec 31 – Jan 5	Mike Aulby (7)
Greater Los Angeles Open	Gable House Bowl	Torrance, California	Jan 7–12	Steve Martin (7)
Showboat Invitational	Showboat Bowling Center	Las Vegas, Nevada	Jan 14–19	Pete Weber (5)
Quaker State Open	Forum Bowling Lanes	Grand Prairie, Texas	Jan 21–26	Mike Durbin (14)
Lite Beer Classic	Don Carter's Kendall Lanes	Miami, Florida	Jan 29 – Feb 2	Pete Weber (6)
BPAA U.S. Open	Galaxy Lanes	Venice, Florida	Feb 3–9	Marshall Holman (18)
AMF Angle Open	Dick Weber Lanes	Florissant, Missouri	Feb 12–16	David Ozio (1)
True Value Open	Landmark Plaza Recreation Center	Peoria, Illinois	Feb 18–23	Ted Hannahs (3)
Lite Beer Open	Buckeye Lanes	North Olmsted, Ohio	Feb 26 – Mar 2	Ernie Schlegel (4)
Toledo Trust PBA National Championship	Imperial Lanes	Toledo, Ohio	Mar 3–9	Mike Aulby (8)
King Louie Open	King Louie West Lanes	Overland Park, Kansas	Mar 11–16	Don Genalo (4)
Lite Beer Championship	Red Carpet Celebrity Lanes	Milwaukee, Wisconsin	Mar 18–23	Wayne Webb (15)
Fair Lanes Open	Fair Lanes Woodlawn	Baltimore, Maryland	Mar 25–30	Wayne Webb (16)
Old Spice Classic	Garden City Bowl	Garden City, New York	Apr 1–6	Mike Aulby (9)
Pat Boone Open	Bradley Bowl	Windsor Locks, Connecticut	Apr 8–13	Mark Williams (2)
Firestone Tournament of Champions	Riviera Lanes	Akron, Ohio	Apr 16–20	Mark Williams (3)
Denver Open	Celebrity Sports Center	Denver, Colorado	Jun 7–12	Mike Aulby (10)
Seattle Open	Leilani Lanes	Seattle, Washington	Jun 14–19	Dennis Jacques (2)
Kessler Open	Earl Anthony's Dublin Bowl	Dublin, California	Jun 21–26	Tony Cariello (1)
Showboat Doubles Classic	Showboat Bowling Center	Las Vegas, Nevada	Jun 27 – Jul 1	Mike Aulby (11), Steve Cook (8)
Southern California Open	Town Square Lanes	Riverside, California	Jul 5–10	Dennis Jacques (3)
Tucson Open	Golden Pin Lanes	Tucson, Arizona	Jul 12–17	David Ozio (2)
Austin Open	Highland Lanes	Austin, Texas	Jul 19–24	Guppy Troup (8)
Hammer Open	Bertrand Lanes	Waukegan, Illinois	Jul 26–31	Bob Chamberlain (2)
Molson Golden Bowling Challenge	Rose Bowl Lanes	Windsor, Ontario	Aug 2–7	Billy Young, Jr. (1)
Greater Buffalo Open	Thruway Lanes	Cheektowaga, New York	Aug 9–14	Gary Skidmore (5)
Columbia Senior/Touring Pro Doubles	Super Bowl Lanes	Erlanger, Kentucky	Aug 16–21	Les Zikes (3), Steve Wunderlich (1)
Japan Cup	Tokyo Port Bowl	Tokyo, Japan	Oct 3–6	Ken Taniguchi (1)
Kodak Invitational	Marcel's Olympic Bowl	Rochester, New York	Oct 28 – Nov 2	Marshall Holman (19)
Budweiser Open	Taylor Lanes	Taylor, Michigan	Nov 4–9	Pete Weber (7)
True Value Open	Woodland Bowl	Indianapolis, Indiana	Nov 11–16	Darryl Bower (1)
Brunswick Memorial World Open	Brunswick Northern Bowl	Glendale Heights, Illinois	Nov 16–23	Mike Aulby (12)
Budweiser Classic	Columbus Square Bowling Palace	Columbus, Ohio	Nov 25–30	Tom Baker (6)
Touring Players Championship	Stardust Lanes	Saginaw, Michigan	Dec 2–7	Dave Husted (3)
