= Mark Baker (bowler) =

American professional ten-pin bowler

Personal information
- Born: Oak Ridge, Tennessee
- Education: Garden Grove High School
- Years active: 1982-1991
- Height: 6 ft 4 in (193 cm)

Bowling Information
- Affiliation: PBA
- Dominant hand: Right (power player)
- Wins: 4 PBA Tour
- 300-games: 16
- Sponsors: Storm, 900 Global

Mark Baker is an American professional ten-pin bowler from Yorba Linda, California. He has been involved in the sport of bowling for over thirty years, starting as a competitor on the PBA Tour, and later becoming a salesperson, author, and coach.

== PBA Tour Career ==
While on PBA Tour from 1982 to 1991, Baker made more than two dozen top-five appearances, including four title victories and seven runner-up finishes (two of them in PBA majors). From 1983 to 1990, Mark was annually in the top-20 in tour earnings.

Baker's performance in 1983 earned him that year's Southern California Bowler of the Year (awarded by the Southern California Bowling Writers Association).

Baker claimed his first PBA Tour title at the 1984 Miller High Life Classic, defeating Bob Handley 221-183 in the title match.

During the 1985 PBA Tour season, Baker finished second in four tournaments and led the PBA in Top-24 finishes with 23. His most notable top finish in 1985 was at the PBA Touring Players Championship, where he was defeated by Dave Husted 268-238 in the final match. Additionally, Baker's 1985 average of 213.7 earned him that year's George Young High Average award.

In 1986, Baker captured the King Louie Open by winning four matches in the final rounds, including the 183-176 championship match victory over Walter Ray Williams, Jr. Later that season at the Firestone Tournament of Champions, Baker finished as the runner-up by losing to Marshall Holman in the championship match 233-211.

More than a year later, Baker returned to the winner's circle by capturing the 1987 PBA Kessler Open. Entering the final round as the top seed, Baker defeated David Ozio 257-233 in the title match.

Baker's last PBA Tour victory was at the 1990 PBA Oregon Open. Entering the final rounds ranked second, Mark defeated Tony Westlake 236-201 in the semifinal match and then beat Steve Wunderlich in the championship match 255-230.

Also while on the Tour, Baker was a contributing writer for the Pacific Bowler, providing weekly content for the "Baker Speaks" column.

Mark is a member of the Orange County USBC Hall of Fame and the California USBC Hall of Fame.

=== PBA Tour titles ===
1. 1984 Miller High Life Classic (Miami, FL)
2. 1986 King Louie Open (Overland Park, KS)
3. 1987 Kessler Open (Dublin, CA)
4. 1990 PBA Oregon Open (Portland, OR)

=== Best results in majors ===
- PBA Tournament of Champions: 2nd (1986), 5th (1988, 1990)
- PBA National Championship: 5th (1989)
- U.S. Open: 4th (1988)
- PBA Players Championship: 2nd (1985)
- ABC Masters: 5th (1984)

=== Additional Awards and Highlights ===
- 1985 George Young High Average Award
- Top-20 in tour earnings (1983 to 1990)

== Life After PBA Tour ==
After working in the bowling supply business as a sales manager for Cal Bowling Supply, Baker is now a coach helping bowlers of all skill levels (including amateurs).

Professionally, he's has served as an assistant coach for Team USA since 2017 and continues to coach current PBA and PWBA Tour Bowlers.

Baker is also the current team manager for the Atom Splitters of the PBA Elite League.

Baker authored a book titled "The Game Changer: A Simple System for Improving Your Bowling Scores" (ISBN 978-1604947748), released in May 2012.
