= John F. Kennedy High School (Michigan) =

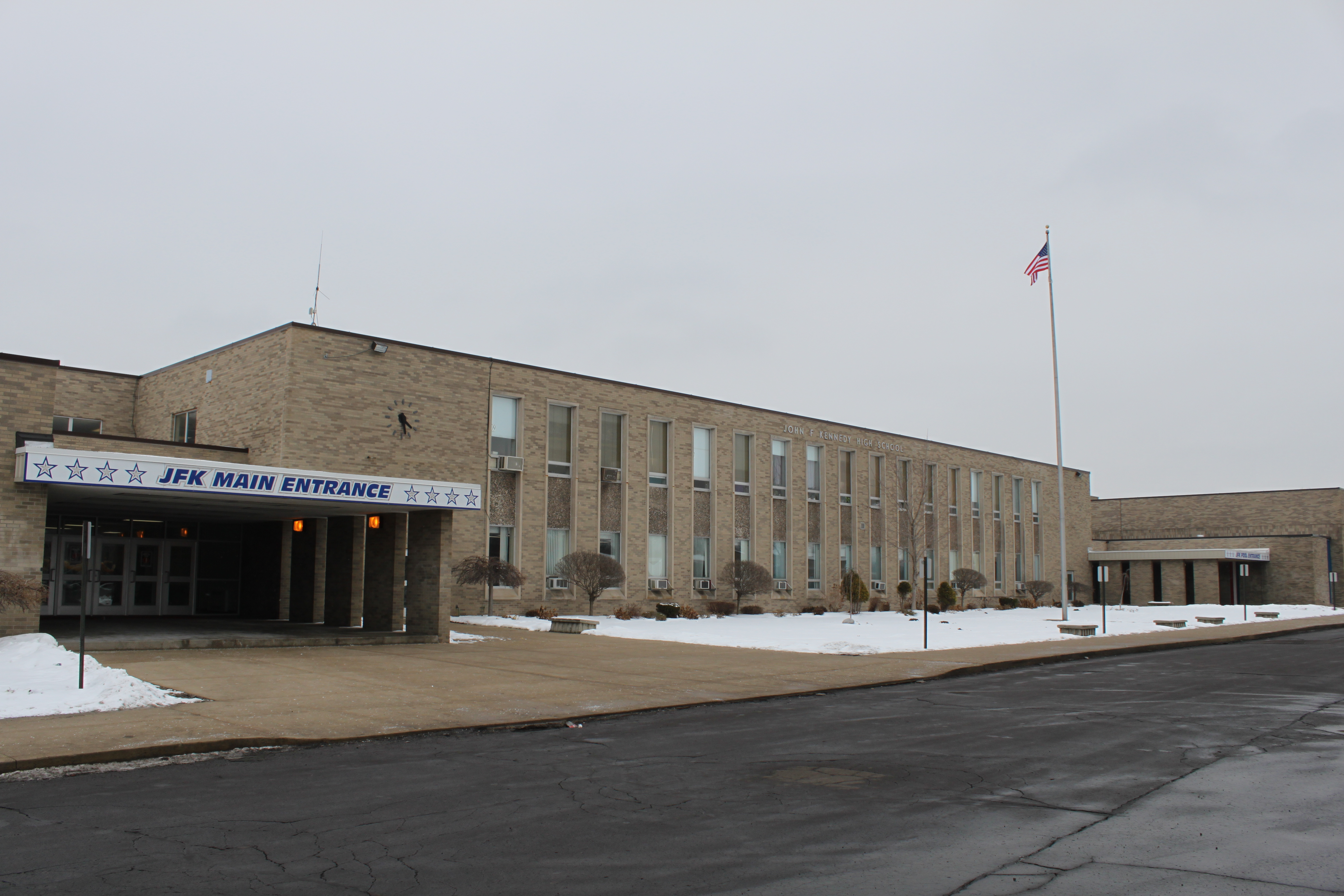

Location
- 13505 Kennedy Drive; Taylor, MI 48180; United States; 42.208355°N 83.260022°W

Information
- Type: Public
- Established: February 8, 1965
- Closed: June 18, 2018
- School district: Taylor School District
- Grades: 9 to 12
- Colors: Red; White; Blue
- Athletics: MHSAA Class A
- Athletics conference: Downriver League
- Mascot: Eagles
- Yearbook: Talon

John F. Kennedy High School was a high school located in Taylor, Michigan, in the United States, in Metro Detroit.

The school, which had two stories, served portions of Taylor and Brownstown Township. It had a capacity smaller than that of Truman High School.

== Notable alumni ==
- Joseph Calleja better known as Joe C., Class of 1993, was an American rapper of Maltese descent. He became popular as part of Kid Rock's band.
- Steve Avery Class of 1988, is a former left-handed pitcher in Major League Baseball who was a 1st round draft pick and young star with the Atlanta Braves in the early 1990s.

== History ==
Kennedy High opened for classes on February 8, 1965. The 1965-66 enrollment was 1,359 10th and 11th grade students. In 1966, the school graduated 399 students in its first graduating class. On April 10, 2017, the Taylor School District Board voted 4–3 to close Kennedy High School due to declining enrollment and cost savings.

The school closed permanently after the 2018 school year, with its students and staff merged with Harry S. Truman High School to form a new school, called Taylor High School. The district decided to discontinue use of Kennedy's building partly because of the facility's smaller capacity, partly it was not compliant with the Americans with Disabilities Act (ADA) and that it had no elevator which could be used for disabled students, and partly because the boiler system and pool heater were not working.
