= Harry S. Truman High School (Taylor, Michigan) =

Taylor High School
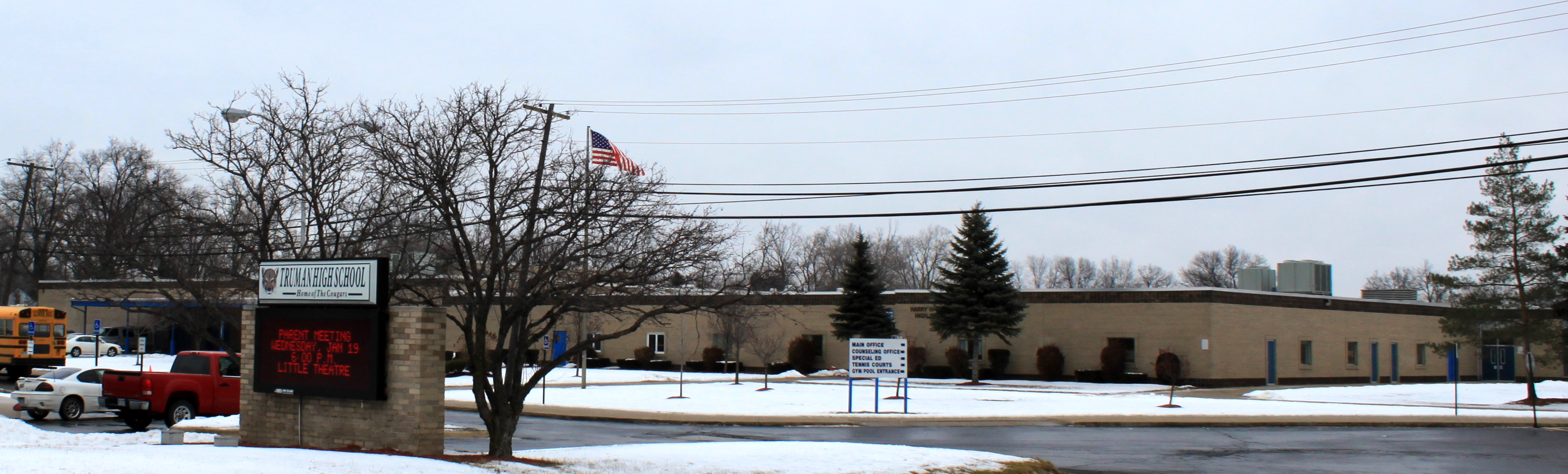

Location
- 11211 Beech Daly Road; Taylor, Michigan 48180; United States; 42°13′29″N 83°17′18″W

Information
- Type: Public
- Established: 1971
- School district: Taylor School District
- Principal: Melissa Skopczynski
- Faculty: 66.5 (on FTE basis)
- Grades: 9 to 12
- Enrollment: 1,083 (2013–14)
- Student to teacher ratio: 16.29:1
- Colors: Black; Gold
- Athletics: MHSAA Class A
- Athletics conference: Downriver League
- Nickname: Griffins
- Yearbook: Griffin
- Website: ths.taylorschools.net

Harry S Truman High School was located in Taylor, Michigan in Metro Detroit. It was opened in 1973 as a combined High School and Middle School. The original school physical plant was designed using the Open School concept, which meant they had classrooms with no walls. But after several years of operating using that concept and a configuration as a combined senior/middle school, Taylor School District leaders decided to change the school into a stand-alone high school. In addition, district leaders began the process of installing walls within the building, creating individual classroom that continue to be the current school configuration today. Truman High School has been renamed Taylor High School in Fall 2018, following the Spring 2018 closure of Kennedy High School. Because of the closure, Kennedy's 2017-18 freshman class was transferred to Truman High School. As part of the renaming, school colors have been changed to black and gold, and the athletics teams became the Griffins.

The school served portions of Taylor, Dearborn Heights, Inkster, and Westland.

== Clubs ==
- Art Club
- Game Club
- Key Club
- Drama Club

== Organizations ==
- Homecoming
- Prom
- SADD
- Student Council
- Year Book
- National Honor Society
- Newspaper
- JROTC
- DECA
- Broadcasting
