= Taylor School District =

School district in Michigan

Address
- 13500 Pine Street Taylor, Wayne, Michigan, 48180; United States

District information
- Type: Public
- Grades: PreK–12
- Superintendent: Michael Wegher
- Budget: $108,749,000 2022-2023 expenditures
- NCES District ID: 2633540

Students and staff
- Students: 5,404 (2024-2025)
- Teachers: 336.49 (on an FTE basis) (2024-2025)
- Staff: 855.88 FTE (2024-2025)
- Student–teacher ratio: 16.06 (2024-2025)

Other information
- Website: www.taylorschools.net

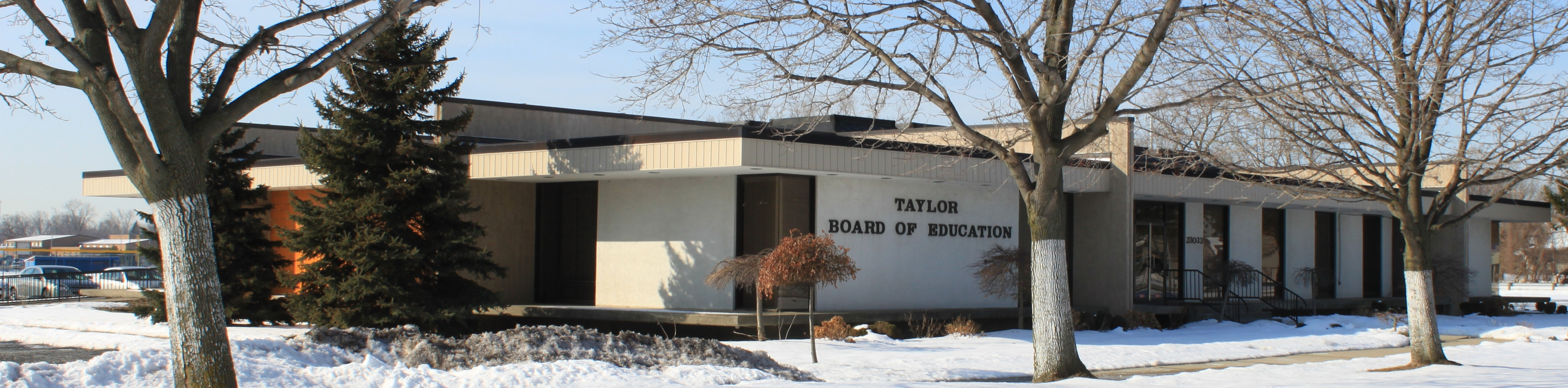
Taylor Board of Education Building

The Taylor School District is a public school district in the city of Taylor in Metro Detroit, Michigan. The district serves Taylor and portions of Brownstown, Dearborn Heights, Inkster, and Westland.

== History ==
Taylor Center High School opened in fall 1953, closed in 1997 and was demolished in 2011.

John F. Kennedy High School opened in February 1965.

In 1974, Truman High School (site of the current Taylor High School) was built as a junior/senior high school using an open classroom concept.

As of Summer 2013, the Inkster Public Schools District was entirely dissolved. The Taylor school district absorbed some of the Inkster boundary. Students south of Michigan and east of Middlebelt were rezoned to Taylor.

Truman High School and Kennedy High School merged in 2018, forming Taylor High School within the Truman building.

In 2021, a $130 million bond issue passed to improve school facilities and replace the high school. In November 2023, Kennedy High School was torn down to accommodate the new high school. In September 2024, the district announced that it would not be proceeding with building the new high school due to increasing construction costs.

A cost-reduction plan was announced in 2024. As part of the plan, Eureka Heights Elementary closed in 2025, and in 2026, Clarence Randall and Taylor Parks Elementaries will be demolished. Clarence Randall Elementary will move to the Hoover Middle School building, while Hoover Middle School will move in with West Middle School.

== Schools ==
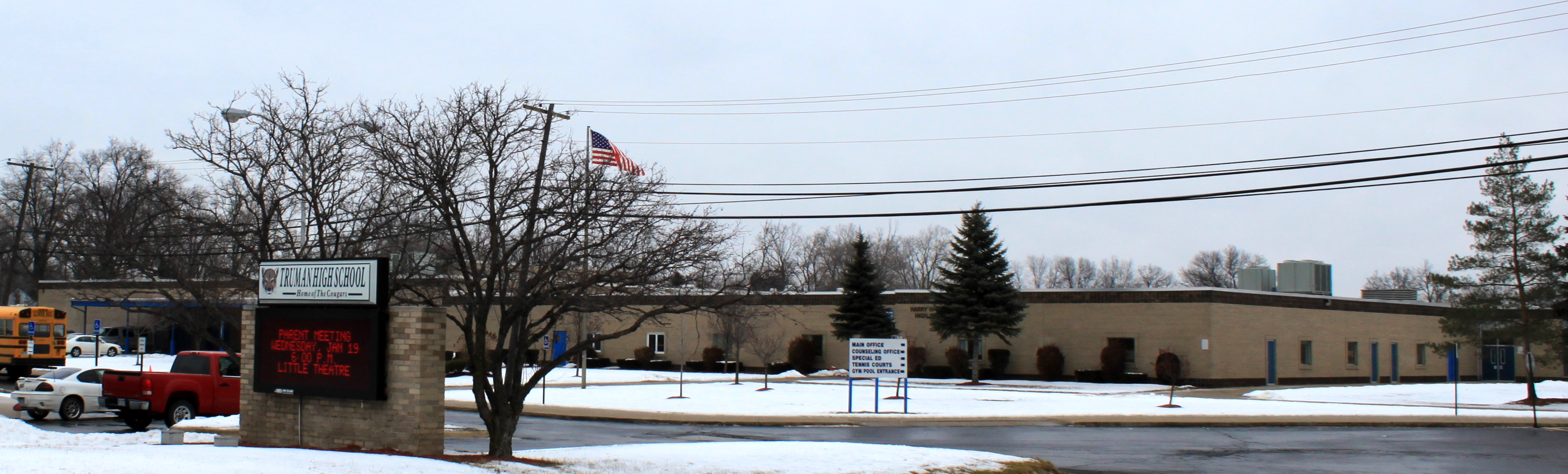
Harry S Truman High School

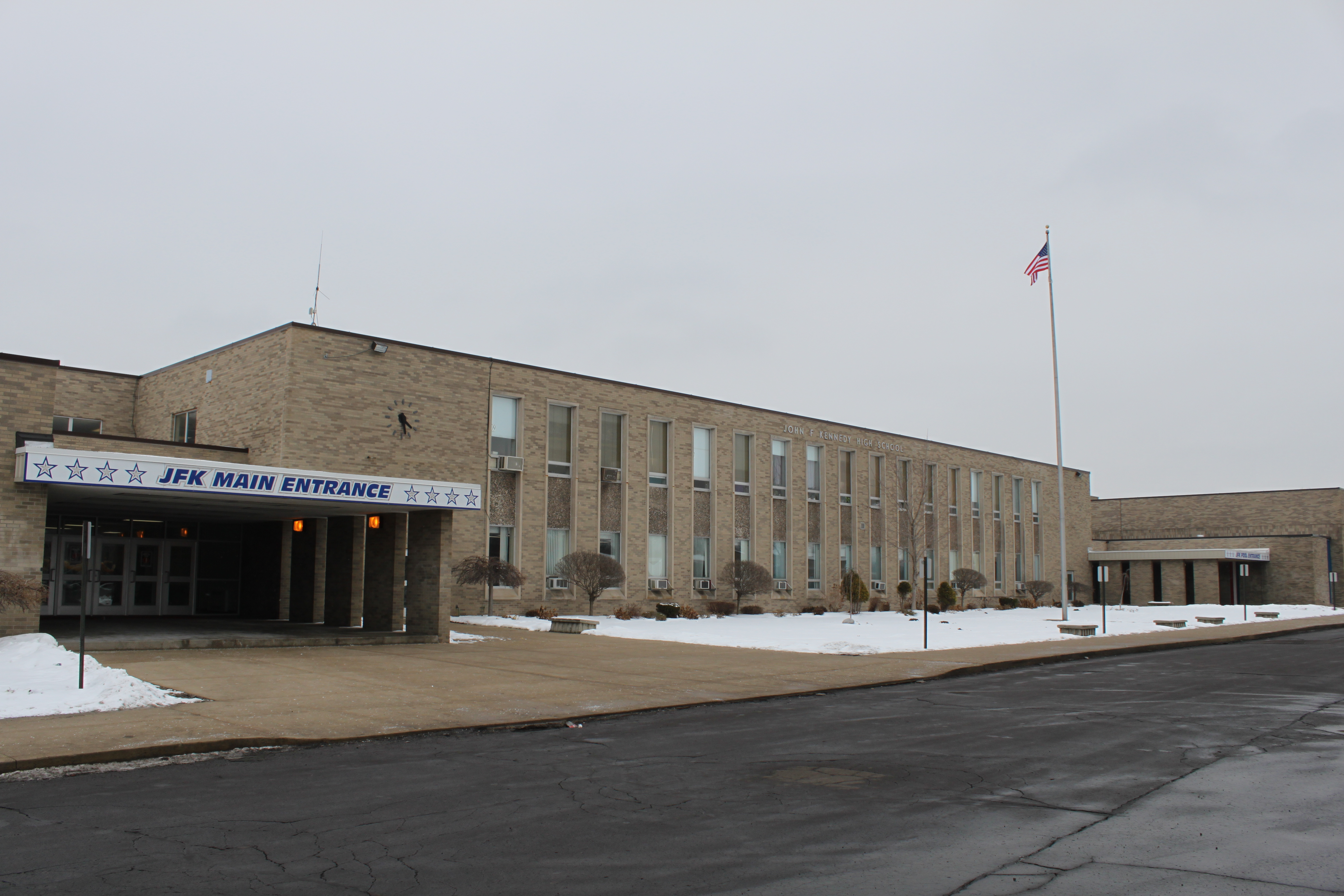
John F. Kennedy High School

Schools in Taylor School District
School	Address	Notes
Johnson Early Childhood Center	20701 Wohlfeil, Taylor	Preschool. Formerly Johnson Early Elementary
Holland Elementary	10201 Holland Road, Trenton	Grades K-5
Kinyon Elementary School	10455 Monroe Blvd Taylor	Grades K-5
Berniece McDowell Elementary School	22929 Brest, Taylor	Grades K-5
Blair Moody Elementary	8280 Hipp, Taylor	Grades K-5
Myers Elementary School	16201 Lauren Drive, Taylor	Grades K-5
Clarence Randall Elementary	27101 Beverly Street, Taylor	Grades K-5
Taylor Middle School	10575 Williams, Taylor	Grades 6-8. Former Robert J West Middle School
Taylor High School	11211 Beech Daly, Taylor	Grades 9-12. Built 1974.
Taylor Career Center	9601 Westlake Rd, Taylor	

== Former ==
- Bartlett Elementary School (Taylor, formerly Racho #2) closed June 2007. Now Green space.
- Edgewood Elementary School (Taylor) - This school was razed & replaced by housing development.
- Edison Elementary School (Taylor) - This school was razed & replaced by a condominium complex, which has been torn down.
- Eurekadale Elementary School - Then The Taylor Head Start Program Closed 2018 Torn Down 2024
- Eureka Heights Elementary - closed spring 2024.
- Federal Elementary School (Dearborn Heights) - Then the Faith Covenant Church International.Closed Down Now Champion Church
- Fred C. Fischer Elementary School (Taylor) - Closed June 2011— Formerly used by the Taylor Schools Utility Dept. and for storage. Then The Guidance Center Closed 2024
- Fletcher Elementary School
- Johnson Elementary School (Taylor) - Renamed Johnson Preschool Center Closed 2009, then preschool was temporarily relocated back to Johnson after a fire in the preschool wing of Clarence Randall. Building was again closed in 2010. Reopened in 2015 as Johnson Early Childhood Center.
- Monroe Elementary School (Taylor) - Building was razed. Used as green space.
- Pine Elementary School (Taylor) - Now the Taylor School District Utility/Maintenance Department.
- Racho Elementary School #1 (Taylor) - This building has been razed.
- Sand Hill Elementary School
- The Sixth Grade Academy - Closed June 2016 - Sixth graders merged into the middle schools Now Taylor Board of Education
- Taylor Center Elementary School - This building has been razed.
- Treadwell Elementary School (Taylor) - Closed June 2006—now the King of Kings Christian Center.
- Wareing Elementary School (Taylor, formerly Fairlane Elementary School) - currently used as a police K9 dog training facility.
- Williams Elementary School - Now the William D. Ford Senior Citizens Activity Center.
- Brake Junior High School - The Sixth Grade Academy Formerly occupied the building. Now Taylor Board of Education
- Taylor Junior High School (Taylor) - Some district services and Career Center now use the building.
- Truman Junior High School - Converted to Truman High School.
- Taylor Center High School (Taylor) - Closed in 1997—roughly half of the school was razed some time later, with the remaining portions seeing unknown use until being fully razed in 2011. The property is now used for greenspace.
- John F. Kennedy High School - Closed in 2018
- Harry S Truman High School - Consolidated with Kennedy High School to become Taylor High School in 2018.
- TITAN Academy Alternative Education - moved to Truman High School for 1 year. Last year in Truman High School 2016.
