= Taylor High School (Michigan) =

School

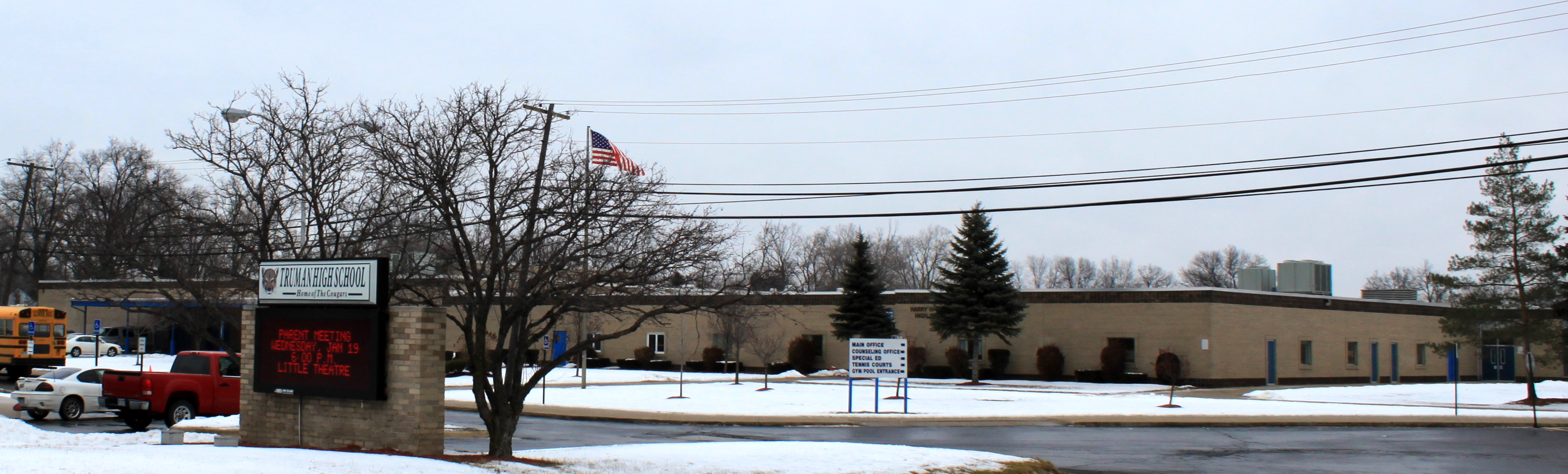

Location
- 11211 Beech Daly Road; Taylor, Michigan 48180; United States; 42°13′27″N 83°17′11″W

Information
- Former name: Harry S. Truman High School
- Type: Public
- Established: 2018
- School district: Taylor School District
- Principal: Daniel Berry
- Teaching staff: 74.00 (FTE)
- Grades: 9 to 12
- Enrollment: 1,371 (2024–2025)
- Student to teacher ratio: 18.53
- Hours in school day: 7:25 AM to 2:20 PM
- Colors: Black; Gold
- Athletics: Football, Cross Country, Baseball, Softball, Basketball, Swimming, Color Guard, Golf, Tennis, Track/Field
- Mascot: Griffin
- Nickname: The Griffins
- Yearbook: The Heritage
- Website: ths.taylorschools.net

Student assessments
- 2021–22 school year Change vs. prior year

M-STEP 11th grade proficiency rates (Science / Social Studies)
- Advanced %: 5.1 / ≤5
- Proficient %: 15.9 / –
- PR. Proficient %: 12.1 / 53.8
- Not Proficient %: 66.8 / 28.6

Average test scores
- SAT Total: 863.3 (▼ −121.7)

Taylor High School is a senior high school in Taylor, Michigan. It is in the Taylor School District. The name is a reference to the city where it is located.

== History ==
The school was created in 2018 as a merger of two previous schools, Kennedy High School and Truman High School. A new mascot and school colours were chosen as a compromise between the two previous school identities. The district used the former Truman building since it was newer, had a bigger capacity, and was in a better condition.

It was started in 1973 as a joint Senior School and Middle School. The initial school real plant has been designed utilizing the Open School thought, which meant they had classrooms with no walls but after a few years of operating with that theory and also a configuration as being a joint senior/middle faculty, Taylor School District leaders chose to improve the college to some standalone large faculty. In addition, district leaders began the practice of installing walls within the construction, creating an individual classroom which is still the present school configuration now. Truman Senior School was Taylor Senior High School in Fall 2018, Following a Spring 2018 close of Kennedy Senior High School. On account of the closing, Kennedy's 2017 18 freshman class was moved to Truman High School. As part of this renaming, faculty colours are changed to black and white gold, and also the sports teams will wind up the Griffins.

== Organizations ==
- Homecoming
- Prom
- SADD
- Student Council
- Year Book
- National Honor Society
- Newspaper
- JROTC
- DECA
- Marching Band
- Esports
- Drama club
