= Oakwood Health System =

Hospital chain

The Oakwood Health System was a group of 4 hospitals and dozens of medical clinics across the Metro Detroit Area. In 2014, Oakwood Health System merged with Beaumont Health System and Botsford Hospital to form Beaumont Health.

== History ==
In 1989, Oakwood Healthcare merged with United Care.

In 2014, Oakwood Health System merged with Beaumont Health System and Botsford Hospital to form Beaumont Health.

== Hospitals ==
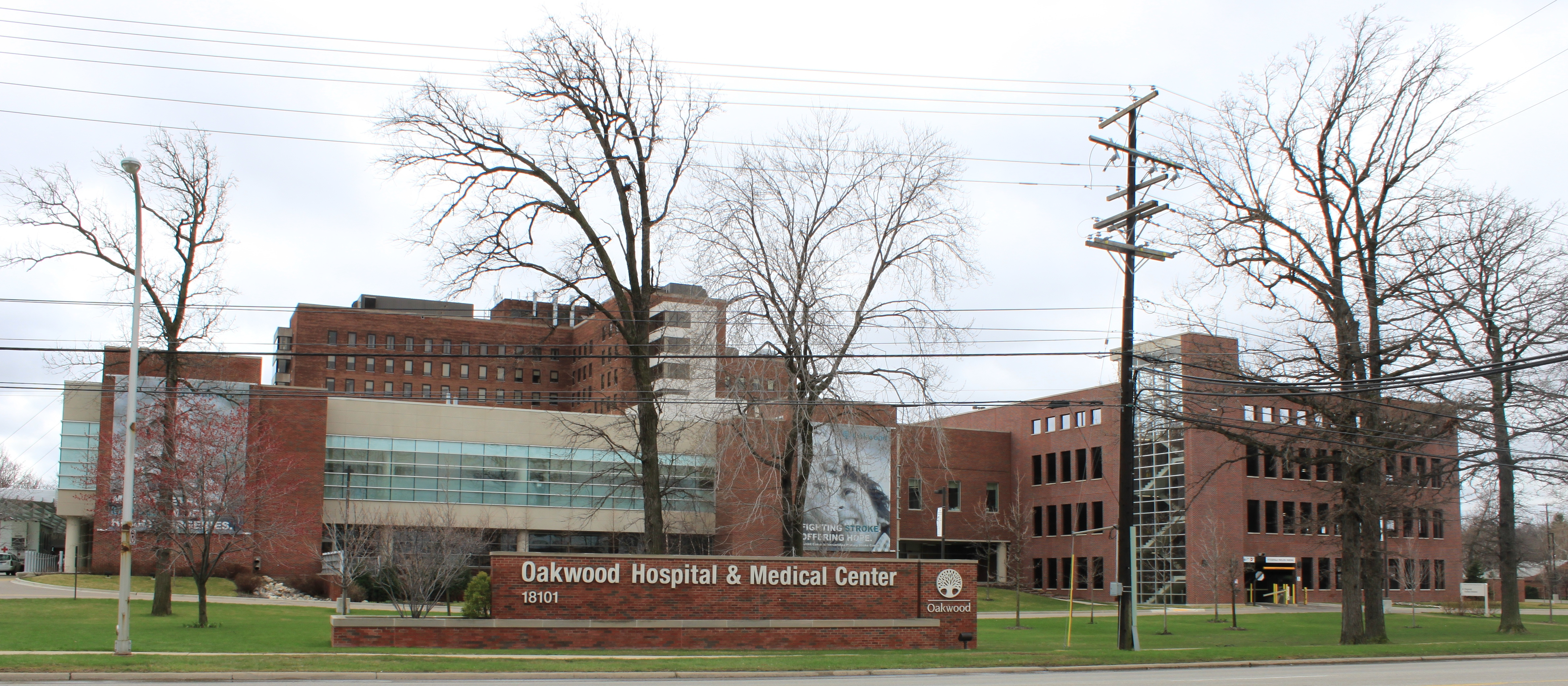
Oakwood Hospital and Medical Center

Oakwood provided acute, specialty, primary and preventative care services, with four acute care hospitals and more than 50 outpatient facilities, 9,000 employees and 1,300 physicians.

The hospitals within the Oakwood Health System include:

- Beaumont Hospital - Dearborn Dearborn, Michigan
- Beaumont Hospital - Wayne Wayne, Michigan
- Beaumont Hospital - Taylor Taylor, Michigan
- Beaumont Hospital - Trenton Trenton, Michigan

== Teen Health Centers ==
Youth in the community can receive healthcare through the Oakwood Teen Health Centers. They provide a wide variety of services through school-based and school-linked programs.

There are three teen health centers and two elementary school clinics:

- Oakwood Inkster Teen Health Center
- Oakwood Romulus Teen Health Center at Romulus High School
- Oakwood Taylor Teen Health Center Southgate, Michigan
- Jefferson-Barns Elementary School Clinic in Wayne-Westland
- Lincoln Elementary School Clinic in Wayne-Westland
