= Pete McCordic =

American professional ten-pin bowler (born 1953)

Personal information
- Born: October 30, 1953 (age 72) Houston, Texas, U.S.
- Years active: 1973–1994
- Height: 5 ft 11 in (180 cm)

Bowling Information
- Affiliation: PBA
- Dominant hand: Right
- Wins: 2 PBA Tour
- 300-games: 11

Pete McCordic (born October 30, 1953) of Katy, Texas is a retired professional 10-pin bowler and member of the Professional Bowlers Association (PBA), bowling on the PBA Tour from 1973 to 1994. During his tenure on the tour, Pete won two titles along with five runner-up finishes plus an additional 25 appearances in the top five.

At the Greater Los Angeles Open on January 31, 1987, McCordic rolled a 300 game in his opening finals match against Wayne Webb. It was the fourth perfect game that was televised in PBA History, ending a 13 year drought of televised perfect games since Jim Stefanich's 300 at the 1974 Midas Open. During the PBA's 60th anniversary season in 2018, McCordic’s perfect game was ranked the fourth-most memorable moment in its tour history.

Both of McCordic's PBA titles were won during the 1988 season. At the PBA Fresno Open on May 28, McCordic qualified for the finals as the top seed and then proceeded to outlast Rey Perez 258–230 in the title match that included nine strikes in a row at the end. At the PBA Miller Lite Challenge in Tucson on July 6, McCordic needed to win four matches in the final rounds to win the tournament, which includes his 236–180 upset victory over Walter Ray Williams, Jr. in the title match.

From the fall of 1996 until 2022, McCordic served as the Southwest Regional Director for the PBA. Soon after his retirement as a director, he was elected to the PBA Hall of Fame class of 2023 for meritorious service.
