= Wellspring Preparatory High School =

Charter school in Grand Rapids, Michigan, United States

Location
- 1031 Page St NE; Grand Rapids, Michigan 49505; United States
- 42.9870°N 85.6433°W

Information
- Funding type: Charter School
- Principal: Emily Kohn
- Grades: 9–12
- Enrollment: 290 (2018-2019)
- Colors: Maroon and White
- Mascot: Wolves
- Website: https://www.nhaschools.com/schools/wellspring-prep-high-school/en

Student assessments
- 2021–22 school year Change vs. prior year

M-STEP 11th grade proficiency rates (Science / Social Studies)
- Advanced %: 20.8 / 25.0
- Proficient %: 20.8 / 18.8
- PR. Proficient %: 10.4 / 41.7
- Not Proficient %: 47.9 / 14.6

Average test scores
- SAT Total: 982.9 (▲ +15.4)

Wellspring Preparatory High School, commonly shortened to Wellspring Prep is a charter high school located in Grand Rapids, Michigan. Wellsprings Preparatory High School is a comprehensive high school serving 9th–12th grades. It has 290 students. The school was opened in 2010. As of late 2020, the school is now owned and operated by National Heritage Academies. The schools maximum capacity is 600 students.

Wellspring Prep is currently being chartered by Bay Mills Community College in Brimley, Michigan. As of early 2019, Wellspring Prep has an early college program for students through Davenport University.

== History ==
The school building was bought by PrepNet in between 2009 and early 2010. The school originally was used as a Christian elementary known by the name of "Creston Christian Elementary School" due to the former school merging with another Christian school in the area. The school was later remodeled to meet the capacity of a High School and opened its doors in fall of 2010.

In 2016, the school upgraded their athletic facilities by demolishing their old gymnasium and building a new one. While this was being completed, Wellspring Prep Basketball played their home games at Kuyper College in Grand Rapids. In addition, a new athletic vestibule and entrance was added. The school also expanded the parking lot for students and athletic events. The new facility was opened for use just before the 2016-2017 school year.

In late 2017, the U.S. News & World Report ranked Wellspring Prep as the number one in the State of Michigan in its list of top schools for that year.

PrepNet has since merged with National Heritage Academies in late 2020. Wellspring Prep is now owned operated by National Heritage Academies, which has its office also located in Grand Rapids.

== Athletics ==
The following sports are offered at Wellspring Prep. Unless noted there are teams for both sexes:

- Track & Field
- Basketball
- Cross Country
- Soccer
- Volleyball
- Bowling

== Clubs ==
The following clubs are offered at Wellspring Prep

- Art Club
- Baseball Club
- Video Game Design
- Chess Club
- Board Games Club
- Debate Team

== Organizations ==
- Student Council
- Yearbook
- National Honor Society
