= Wayne County Community College District =

Community college district in Detroit, Michigan, U.S.

Wayne County Community College
- WCCCD logo
- Former names: Wayne County Community College
- Type: Public community college district
- Established: 1967
- Chancellor: Curtis Ivery
- Location: Detroit, Michigan, United States
- Mascot: Wildcats
- Website: wcccd.edu

Wayne County Community College District (WCCCD), commonly known as WC3, is a public community college district with its headquarters in Detroit, Michigan. It was founded in 1967 and has six campuses: Eastern, Downtown, Downriver, Northwest, Western, and University Square.

== Governance ==
The college is governed by a nine-member board of trustees, three seats are elected every two years for six-year terms.

== Campuses ==
The Downriver Campus is located on 100 acres (0.40 km^{2}) in Taylor, Michigan, and was built in 1978.

The Northwest Campus, located in northwest Detroit, was for many years located on Greenfield Road just south of Joy Road, less than half a mile from the Dearborn city line. In August 2008, the campus relocated to a new location at 8200 West Outer Drive, just west of the Southfield Freeway, at the former site of Mercy College of Detroit before it merged in 1990 with University of Detroit to become University of Detroit Mercy (UDM) and after the merger the UDM Dental School.

The district also has a 117-acre (0.47 km^{2}) western campus located at the corner of Haggerty and I-94 in Van Buren Township, Michigan. It was initially built in 1981 and as of 2008 is going through a 43,000-square-foot (4,000 m^{2}) expansion.

The downtown campus is located at 801 West Fort Street in downtown Detroit.

The Eastern Campus is located on Detroit's eastside. It is located at 5901 Connor Road just north of Warren Avenue, at the I-94 freeway exit.

The University Square campus at 19305 Vernier Road in Harper Woods opened in January 2009. The campus, known as the Grosse Pointe / Harper Woods Campus Center, was originally located by Eastland Mall in Harper Woods.

== District areas ==
Most areas of Wayne County are served by Wayne Community College District. Wayne County places that are not in-district include : Dearborn, Garden City, Highland Park, Livonia, Northville, Plymouth, and sections of Canton Township and Dearborn Heights.

== See also ==
- Other community colleges in Wayne County
  - Henry Ford College (Dearborn)
  - Schoolcraft College (northwestern Wayne County)
