= Mark Williams (professional bowler) =

American ten-pin bowler (born 1958)

Personal information
- Born: January 23, 1958 (age 68) Beaumont, Texas, U.S.
- Years active: 1980–2019
- Height: 6 ft 1 in (185 cm)

Bowling Information
- Affiliation: PBA
- Rookie year: 1980
- Dominant hand: Right
- Wins: 7 PBA Tour (3 majors); 3 PBA50 Tour (1 major); 1 PBA60 Tour
- 300-games: 8
- Sponsors: Storm

Mark Williams (born January 23, 1958) of Beaumont, Texas is a professional right-handed 10-pin bowler and has been a member of the Professional Bowlers Association for over 40 years. During his time on the PBA Tour, Mark won 7 titles including 3 majors, winning the PBA Tournament of Champions twice. He is one of only nine bowlers to win the Tournament of Champions multiple times. In addition to his tour victories, Mark achieved 8 runner-up finishes. On the PBA Senior Tour, Mark has won 3 titles, including 1 major. He has an additional title on the PBA60 Tour.

In recognition of his achievements, Mark was inducted into the PBA Hall of Fame in 1999 and the USBC Hall of Fame in 2021.

Since 2000, Williams is the owner and operator of Crossroads Bowling Center in Beaumont, Texas.

== Williams' career PBA titles ==
Major championships are in bold type.

=== PBA Tour ===
1. 1984 Waukegan Open (Waukegan, IL)
2. 1985 Pat Boone Open (Windsor Locks, CT)
3. **1985 Firestone Tournament of Champions** (Akron, OH)
4. **1986 Budweiser Touring Players Championship** (Taylor, MI)
5. 1988 Fair Lanes Open (Towson, MD)
6. **1988 Firestone Tournament of Champions** (Akron, OH)
7. 1996 Merit Mixed Doubles Championship with Aleta Sill (Las Vegas, NV)

=== PBA50 Tour) ===
1. 2008 Lake County Indiana Open (Hammond, IN)
2. 2009 Lake County Indiana Open (Hammond, IN)
3. **2010 Senior U.S. Open** (Las Vegas, NV)

=== PBA60 Tour ===
1. 2019 PBA60 Dick Weber Championship (Fort Wayne, IN)
