= Tom Crites =

American professional ten-pin bowler

Personal information
- Born: February 10, 1962 (age 64) Tampa, Florida, U.S.
- Years active: 1984–1993
- Height: 6 ft 0 in (183 cm)

Bowling Information
- Affiliation: PBA
- Rookie year: 1985
- Dominant hand: Right
- Wins: 5 PBA Tour (2 majors); 1985 PBA Rookie of the Year; 10 PBA Regional Tour
- 300-games: 9

Tom Crites of Loveland, Colorado is a former professional 10-pin bowler who was a member of the Professional Bowlers Association, bowling on the PBA Tour. During his roughly ten years on tour, Tom collected five titles (including two majors) with an additional ten appearances in the top-five. On the PBA Regional Tour, Tom was able to capture ten titles on the Southern Regional events.

Crites' performance during his 1985 rookie campaign was strong enough to earn him PBA Rookie of the Year honors. Tom then made his next season (1986) more rewarding, by winning his first PBA title and major, the 1986 PBA National Championship. Entering the final round as the top seed, Tom triumphed over defending champion Mike Aulby 190–184 in the title match. Tom's 190 score is the tournament's record low to win the title.

Crites' second major win happened one season later at the 1987 Touring Players Championship. Entering the final round as the #2 seed, Tom defeated #3 seed Wayne Webb 205–166 in the semifinal match and then defeated #1 seed Marshall Holman 221–205.

Citing ten years of constant travel and relative lack of success his last three years, Crites retired from the PBA Tour during the latter part of the 1993 season.

== PBA Tour titles ==
Major championships are in bold type.

1. **1986 Toledo Trust PBA National Championship** (Toledo, OH)
2. 1987 Showboat Atlantic City Open (Atlantic City, NJ)
3. **1987 Budweiser Touring Players Championship** (Taylor, MI)
4. 1988 Seattle Open (Seattle, WA)
5. 1989 Kessler Classic (Riverside, CA)
