= National Heritage Academies =

Charter management organization

National Heritage Academies, Inc.
- Industry: Education management organization
- Founded: 1995; 31 years ago
- Headquarters: Grand Rapids, Michigan
- Website: www.nhaschools.com/en

National Heritage Academies, Inc. (NHA) is a for-profit education management organization headquartered in Grand Rapids, Michigan. As of the 2024-25 school year, NHA operates 103 charter schools in nine states: Michigan, Indiana, Ohio, New York, North Carolina, Colorado, Georgia, Louisiana, and Wisconsin. NHA is the largest charter school operator in Michigan and one of the largest charter school operators in the United States. NHA schools are prominent among charter institutions for employing the brick and mortar or traditional school concept.

== History ==
NHA was formed in 1995 by entrepreneur J. C. Huizenga.

== Operations ==
In 2015, National Heritage Academies managed charter schools enrolled over 58,000 students on a vendor operated school basis.

NHA managed charter schools are publicly funded and charge no tuition. They are authorized by state-approved institutions such as universities and school boards, and therefore have no geographic boundaries. The schools focus on college preparedness and generally serve students from kindergarten through eighth grade, with some schools also offering pre-kindergarten.

Unlike most charter school companies in Michigan, NHA purchases the school buildings, including those that were built from public money.

== Academics ==
According to a 2017 study by the Center for Research on Education Outcomes, students in NHA schools were found to show improved spring-to-spring academic growth in the subjects of reading and math, compared with their traditional public school peers.

NHA schools use the NWEA test as a measure of student performance. The Northwest Evaluation Association has instituted an assessment process for both mathematics and reading. This computerized assessment is administered to provide data on students' growth in the fields of math and reading.

== All Schools ==
=== Colorado ===
- Foundations Academy
- Landmark Academy at Reunion
- Mountain View Academy
- Sky Ranch Academy
- Capstone Academy

=== Georgia ===
- Atlanta Heights Charter School
- Four Points Preparatory Academy

=== Indiana ===
- Aspire Charter Academy

=== Louisiana ===
- Advantage Charter Academy
- Inspire Charter Academy
- Willow Charter Academy

=== Michigan ===
- Achieve Charter Academy
- Burton Glen Charter Academy
- Canton Charter Academy - Central Michigan University is the charter overseer.
- Center Line Preparatory Academy - Central Michigan University is the charter overseer.
- Chandler Woods Charter Academy
- Cross Creek Charter Academy
- Detroit Enterprise Academy
- Detroit Merit Charter Academy
- Detroit Premier Academy
- Eagle Crest Charter Academy - Central Michigan University is the charter overseer
- East Arbor Charter Academy
- Endeavor Charter Academy
- Excel Charter Academy
- Flagship Academy
- Fortis Academy
- Grand River Preparatory High School
- Great Oaks Academy
- Hamtramck Academy
- Keystone Academy
- Knapp Charter Academy
- Lansing Charter Academy
- Laurus Academy
- Legacy Charter Academy
- Linden Charter Academy - Central Michigan University is the charter overseer
- Metro Charter Academy
- New Branches Charter Academy
- North Saginaw Charter Academy - Central Michigan University is the charter overseer
- Oakside Scholars Charter Academy
- Paragon Charter Academy
- Paramount Charter Academy
- Pembroke Academy - Central Michigan University is the charter overseer
- Plymouth Scholars Charter Academy
- Prevail Academy
- Quest Charter Academy - Central Michigan University is the charter overseer
- Reach Academy
- Regent Park Scholars
- Ridge Park Charter Academy
- River City Scholars
- South Arbor Charter Academy - Central Michigan University is the charter overseer
- South Canton Scholars Charter Academy
- South Pointe Scholars Charter Academy
- Taylor Exemplar Academy
- Timberland Charter Academy
- Triumph Academy
- Vanderbilt Charter Academy
- Vanguard Charter Academy
- Vista Charter Academy
- Walker Charter Academy
- Walton Charter Academy
- Warrendale Charter Academy
- Westfield Charter Academy
- Wellspring Preparatory High School
- Windemere Park Charter Academy

=== New York ===
- Brooklyn Dreams Charter School
- Brooklyn Excelsior Charter School
- Brooklyn Scholars Charter School
- Buffalo United Charter School
- Riverton Street Charter School
- Southside Academy Charter School

=== North Carolina ===
- Forsyth Academy
- Gate City Charter Academy
- Greensboro Academy
- Johnston Charter Academy
- Matthews Charter Academy
- Peak Charter Academy
- Phoenix Academy
- PreEminent Charter School
- Queens Grant Community School
- Research Triangle Charter Academy
- Rolesville Charter Academy
- Summerfield Charter Academy
- Wake Forest Charter Academy
- Winterville Charter Academy
- Summit Creek Charter Academy

=== Ohio ===
- Alliance Academy of Cincinnati
- Apex Academy
- Bennett Venture Academy
- Emerson Academy
- North Dayton School of Discovery
- Orion Academy
- Pathway School of Discovery
- Pinnacle Academy
- Stambaugh Charter Academy
- Winterfield Venture Academy

=== Wisconsin ===
- Milwaukee Scholars
- Mill Creek Academy

== Resources ==
- "Excel Charter School Gets Approval For Building," Grand Rapids Press, August 11, 1995, p. A12.
- Franklin, Amy, "Federal Court Dismisses Lawsuit Against Charter School," Associated Press Newswires, September 27, 2000.
- Golden, Daniel, "Common Prayer: Old-Time Religion Gets a Boost at a Chain of Charter Schools," Wall Street Journal, September 15, 1999, p. A1.
- Kirkbride, Ron, "Banking Syndicate Raises $25 Million to Expand National Heritage Schools," Grand Rapids Press, July 12, 2002, p. A6.
- Knape, Chris, "National Heritage Remains in Class of Its Own," Grand Rapids Press, August 13, 2003, p. A10.
- Molinari, Deanne, "Peter Ruppert: Inside Track," Grand Rapids Business Journal, June 30, 1997, p. 5.
- "National Heritage Makes Money Running Charter Schools," Associated Press Newswires, December 2, 2001.
- Rent, Katy, "Going to the Head of the Class," Grand Rapids Business Journal, November 19, 2001, p. 3.
- Riede, Paul, "State Oks Southside Charter School," Post-Standard (Syracuse), December 21, 2001, p. A1.
- Schuetz, Kym, and Roland Wilkerson, "Charter School Sale Would Fund Expansion," Grand Rapids Press, October 9, 1998, p. A1.
- Singhania, Lisa, "Companies See Profit in Charter Schools," Associated Press Newswires, April 28, 2000.
- Weiker, Jim, "Charter Group Says It Has Funds To Grow," Grand Rapids Press, January 18, 2000, p. B1.
- Wyatt, Edward, "Charter School to Raise Topic of Creationism," New York Times, February 18, 2000, p. 1.https://www.nytimes.com/2000/02/18/nyregion/charter-school-to-raise-topic-of-creationism.html
