= Joe Berardi =

American professional bowler (born 1954)

Personal information
- Born: November 20, 1954 (age 71)
- Home town: Brooklyn, New York, U.S.
- Years active: 1972–1990
- Height: 5 ft 9 in (175 cm)
- Weight: 140 lb (64 kg)

Sport
- Country: United States
- Sport: Ten-pin bowling
- League: PBA
- Turned pro: 1972

Achievements and titles
- National finals: 11 PBA Tour (3 majors, 2 doubles); One of PBA's 50 Greatest Players (2008 poll)

Joe Berardi (from Brooklyn, New York) is an American retired professional bowler who played on the PBA Tour as a member of the Professional Bowlers Association. During his time on the tour, Berardi captured 11 tournament victories (including three majors), had six runner-up finishes, and made the top-five a total of 39 times.

Berardi's 1979 U.S. Open title was both his first career Tour victory and first PBA major.

When Berardi won the 1983 Firestone PBA Tournament of Champions, he became the tournament's first champion to climb the ladder from the #5 position and win all four stepladder finals matches.

Berardi was inducted into the PBA Hall of Fame in 1990.

During the 2008-09 PBA Tour season, Berardi was tabbed as one of the "PBA’s 50 Greatest Players of the Last 50 Years" by a panel of bowling experts commissioned by the PBA, ranking at #40 (tied with Tom Baker).

== PBA Tour titles ==
Major championships are in bold type.

1. **1979 BPAA U.S. Open** (Windsor Locks, CT)
2. 1979 Tucson Open (Tucson, AZ)
3. 1980 Buffalo Open (Cheektowaga, NY)
4. 1980 Kessler Open (Lansing, MI)
5. **1982 ABC Masters** (Baltimore, MD)
6. **1983 Firestone PBA Tournament of Champions** (Akron, OH)
7. 1986 Columbia Senior/Touring Pro Doubles Championship (with Teata Semiz) (Erlanger, KY)
8. 1988 AC-Delco Classic (Torrance, CA)
9. 1988 Showboat PBA Doubles Classic (with Dave Ferraro) (Las Vegas, NV)
10. 1988 True Value Open (Indianapolis, IN)
11. 1989 Budweiser Challenge (Rochester, NY)
