= Open classroom =

Learning space design format

An open classroom is a student-centered learning space design format which first became popular in North America in the late 1960s and 1970s, with a re-emergence in the early 21st century.

== Theory ==
The idea of the open classroom was that a large group of students of varying skill levels would be in a single, large classroom with several teachers overseeing them. It is ultimately derived from the one-room schoolhouse, but sometimes expanded to include more than two hundred students in a single multi-age and multi-grade classroom. Rather than having one teacher lecture to the entire group at once, students are typically divided into different groups for each subject according to their skill level for that subject. The students then work in small groups to achieve their assigned goal. Teachers serve as both facilitators and instructors.

Certain education professionals, including Professor Gerald Unks at the University of North Carolina at Chapel Hill, strongly support this system particularly with young children. If poorly planned or laid out, open classrooms can sometimes lead to problems with noise and poor ventilation. Classrooms that are physically open are increasingly rare, as many schools that were built "without walls" have long since put up permanent partitions of varying heights. However, in many places, the open philosophy as an instructional technique continues. Larry Cuban states, 'To call it a fad would miss the deeper meaning of “open classrooms” as another skirmish in the ideological wars that have split educational progressives from conservatives since the first tax-supported schools opened their doors in the early 1800s.'

Piedmont Open/IB Middle School in Charlotte, North Carolina, for example, was started as one of the original two magnet middle schools in Charlotte in the 1970s. While the other magnet (a "traditional" school) has closed, Piedmont is still functioning as a modified open school thirty years later, all the time housed in a traditional physical plant.

== Open-space school ==
Advocates of open plan schools argue that students 'should be allowed to learn in ways suited to their individual differences' and that the most effective teaching and learning strategies allow teachers to work collaboratively with each other and team teach. The traditional classroom boxes with desks lined up in rows impede teachers' efforts to work in teams and have students 'in the flexible and varied groupings necessary' (Mark, J 2001:5).

Bunting agrees, saying that 'traditional classrooms must change' and proposes a model of a generic space for students to be co-located with teachers, which are decorated by the students to give them ownership, and teachers and students only move when necessary to access specialised space (Bunting, A 2004:11–12).

Klein found in a 1975 study that third graders with low levels of anxiety were more creative in open schools than in traditional school. Children with high levels of anxiety showed no differences between open-space and traditional school models. Students in open-spaced schools scored higher on preference for novelty and change. The open-space school concept was introduced into the United States in 1965 as an experimental elementary school architecture, where the physical walls separating classrooms were removed to promote movement across class areas by teachers.

In an ethnographic study, Murphy revisited a surviving open-space high school to examine teachers' enduring navigation of the reform. Despite the architecture's challenges, participants valued the instructional visibility and close-knit collegiality it enabled. Accordingly, they viewed their district's plans for a new facility of self-contained classrooms with anxiety. However, in practice this is not typical since teachers, following social conventions, tend to teach traditionally as if the walls were still present. Further, modern open-space schools tend to use modular furniture to separate classrooms in a manner similar to "cubicle farms" used in many corporate environments.
