= Mats Karlsson =

Swedish ten-pin bowler

Personal information
- Born: August 12, 1956 (age 69) Gothenburg, Sweden
- Years active: 1982-1993
- Height: 6 ft 1 in (185 cm)

Bowling Information
- Affiliation: PBA
- Rookie year: 1982
- Dominant hand: Right (stroker delivery)
- Wins: 4 PBA Tour
- 300-games: 2

Mats Karlsson (born August 12, 1956) is a ten-pin bowler from Gothenburg, Sweden who competed internationally and on the PBA Tour in the United States.

Karlsson became the first international player to win a PBA Tour event in the U.S. when he captured the 1986 Southern California Open in Riverside, California. He went on to win three more PBA titles, along with 1 runner-up finish (1988 Greater Hartford Open) and 10 appearances in the top-5.

En route to winning the 1987 Greater Los Angeles Open, Karlsson entered the finals as the #3 seed. Before defeating Ricky Corona in the title match and John Gant in match #3, Karlsson had to best Pete McCordic in match #2, who rolled a perfect 300 game in match #1 against Wayne Webb (the PBA's 4th televised perfect game).

Internationally, he won the 1991 AMF World Open and 10 medals in the FIQ World Championships.

In 2009, Karlsson was honored as the best male bowler in 100 years of organized bowling in Sweden, during ceremonies held in Stockholm.

For ten years, Karlsson served as the coach for Norway's national bowling team (until 2014). Karlsson was also owner and operator of Lundby Stadium Bowl in Gothenburg.

On March 14, 2025, the Professional Bowlers Association granted official title status to nine bowlers, who were not actual PBA members at the time of winning a PBA Tour or PBA50 Tour event. This includes Karlsson's victory at the 1983 AMF Grand Prix of Ten Pin Bowling.

== Karlsson's PBA Bowling Titles ==
1. 1983 AMF Grand Prix Of Ten Pin Bowling (Crawley, England)
2. 1986 Southern California Open (Riverside, California)
3. 1987 Greater Los Angeles Open (Torrance, California)
4. 1988 Brunswick Memorial World Open (Glendale Heights, IL)
