= Don Genalo =

American professional bowler

Personal information
- Born: Donald Edward Genalo; February 21, 1958 Merrick, New York, U.S.
- Years active: 1981–1995

Bowling Information
- Affiliation: PBA
- Rookie year: 1981
- Dominant hand: Right
- Wins: 6 PBA Tour

Don Genalo (born February 21, 1958) is an American right-handed ten-pin bowler and former member of the Professional Bowlers Association.

== PBA career ==
Genalo joined the PBA Tour in 1981, and won a total of 6 PBA nationally televised tournament titles during his career.

Genalo is a right handed bowler, he notably uses the finger tip grip, and places his pointer and little fingers very close together with the other two. This allows his hand to stay behind the ball, while allowing his unusually long fingers to maximize the lift upon delivery.

He was inducted into the Robert Morris University Hall of Fame in 1991 and the Ohio State USBC Hall of Fame in 2003

=== PBA Tour titles ===
1. 1983 King Louie Open (Overland Park, Kansas)
2. 1983 Long Island Open (Garden City, New York)
3. 1984 Seattle Open (Seattle, Washington)
4. 1985 King Louie Open (Overland Park, Kansas)
5. 1986 Lite Beer Championship (Milwaukee, Wisconsin)
6. 1986 Molson Golden Bowling Challenge (Windsor, Ontario, Canada)

== Personal life ==
Genalo grew up in Long Island, New York, and moved to Toledo, Ohio in the mid 1980s. He and his wife Mary have two daughters, Anne and Laura, and 4 grandchildren.

Don is currently retired from the US Post Office.

He is currently a color analyst for BCSN coverage of Toledo area high school bowling TV broadcasts.
