= Taylor, Michigan =

- City
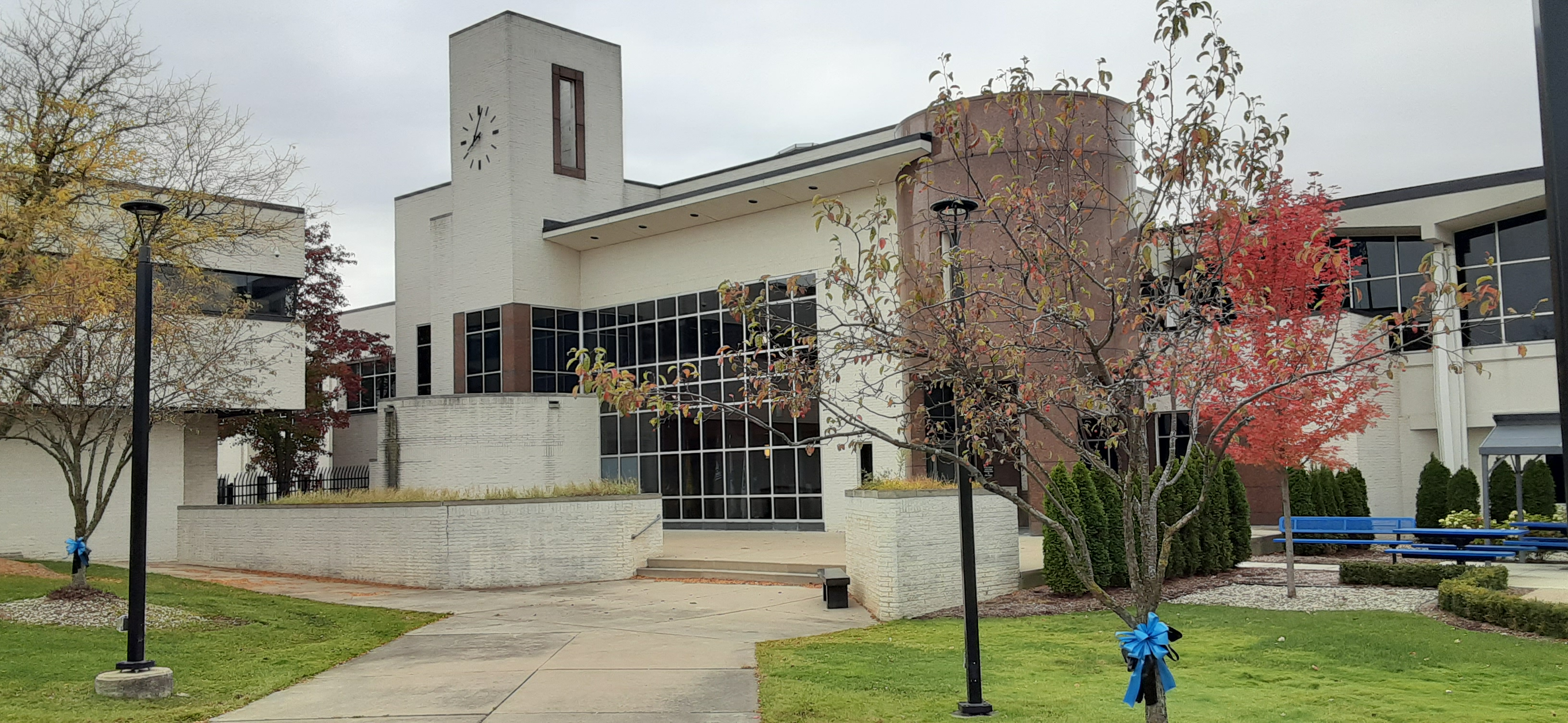

- Flag Seal Logo
- Nickname: Taylortucky
- Motto: "Omnis auctorias populo est" "Made For You"
- Interactive map of Taylor, Michigan
- Location within Michigan Location within the United States
- Coordinates: 42°14′27″N 83°16′11″W
- Country: United States
- State: Michigan
- County: Wayne
- Organized: 1847 (Taylor Township)
- Incorporated: 1968

Government
  - Type: Mayor–council
  - Mayor: Tim Woolley
  - Clerk: Cynthia Bower

Area
  - City: 23.63 sq mi (61.21 km^{2})
  - Land: 23.62 sq mi (61.17 km^{2})
  - Water: 0.019 sq mi (0.05 km^{2})
- Elevation: 614 ft (187 m)

Population (2020)
  - City: 63,409
  - Density: 2,685.0/sq mi (1,036.67/km^{2})
  - Metro: 4,285,832 (Metro Detroit)
- Time zone: UTC−5 (Eastern (EST))
  - Summer (DST): UTC−4 (EDT)
- ZIP code(s): 48180
- Area codes: 313 and 734
- FIPS code: 26-79000
- GNIS feature ID: 1614609
- Website: cityoftaylor.com

Taylor is a city in Wayne County in the U.S. state of Michigan. A Downriver suburb of Detroit, Taylor is located roughly 16 miles (25.7 km) southwest of downtown Detroit. As of the 2020 census, Taylor had a population of 63,409, ranking as the 17th most-populated city in Michigan.

The area was originally a civil township known as Taylor Township, which was organized in 1848 and later incorporated as the city of Taylor in 1968. Taylor is the most-populated municipality of the Downriver community, and it is located about 5 miles (8.0 km) west of the southern border of Detroit and about 15 miles (24.1 km) southwest of Downtown Detroit.

Taylor is home to the Southland Center, Taylor Sportsplex, Corewell Health Hospital – Taylor, the Downriver Campus of the Wayne County Community College District, and is the founding location of Hungry Howie's Pizza. The city was also home to the now-demolished Gibraltar Trade Center. Heritage Park is located within the city and hosts the Junior League World Series, which invites youth baseball players from all over the world for an annual tournament in August. The city is served by the Taylor School District.

== History ==
=== Predecessor ===
The city of Taylor traces its origins back to when it was originally part of Ecorse Township to the west. At this time the land was mostly rural farm land with little development.

The first landowner in the area was Peter Coan, who purchased an 80-acre (32 ha) parcel from the US government in 1830. The Coan family name continues through the existence of the artificial Coan Lake in Heritage Park, which was named in his honor.

=== Township ===
Many residents in the western portion of the township found that they lived too far away to participate in the civic affairs and functions of the township. Because of this, the residents petitioned to form a separate community. The petition was granted in 1847 and the new community was named Taylor Township. The township was named after Major General Zachary Taylor, a hero of the Mexican–American War who would go on to serve as the twelfth president of the United States.

A small train station was built in 1876 after the Wabash Railroad built a railroad line through Taylor Township. George E Hand sold the right-of-way through his land and the station was named after him. The area to some locals became known as "Hand Corners". The original station was destroyed in a fire in 1965 however a near replica was built at Heritage Park.

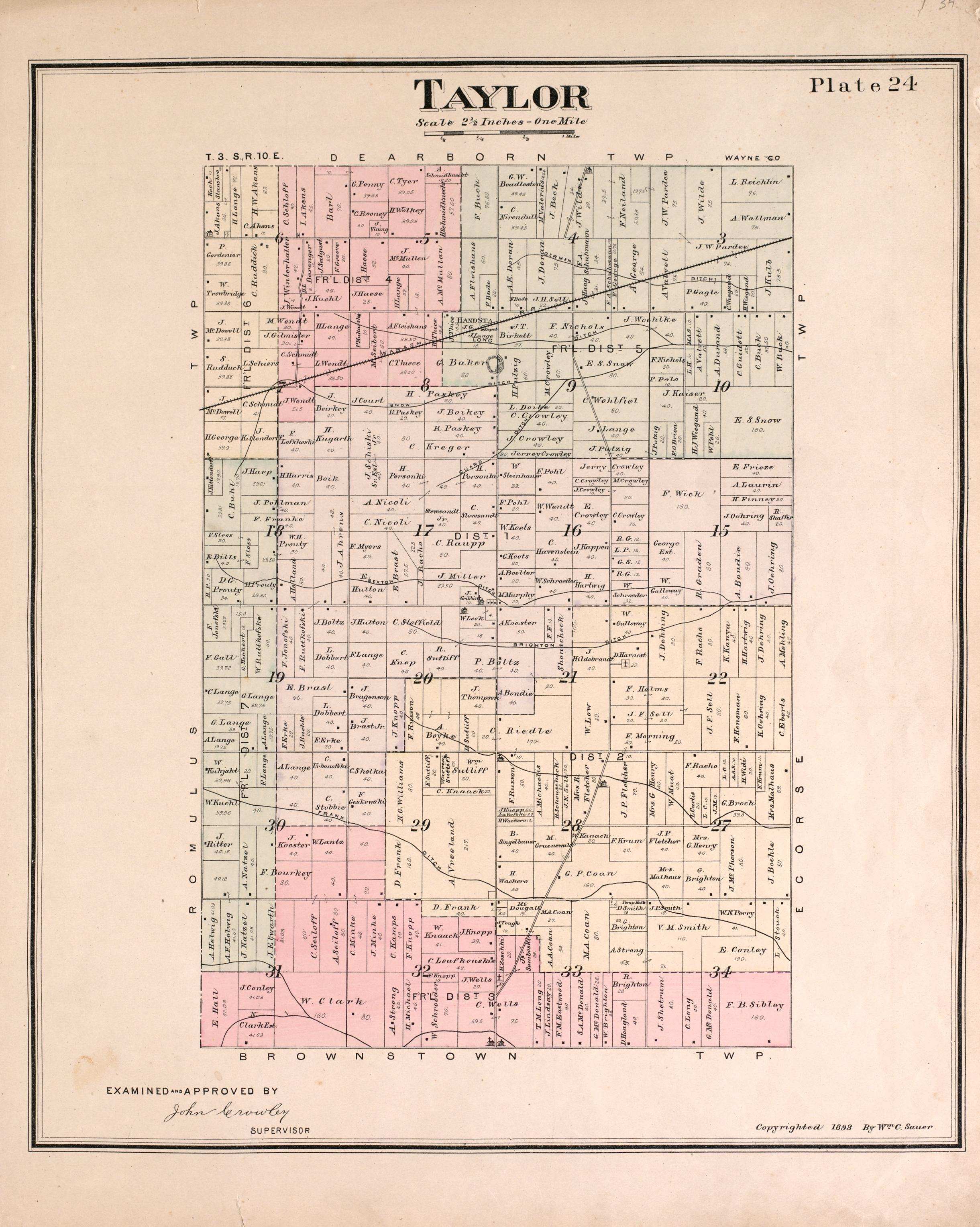
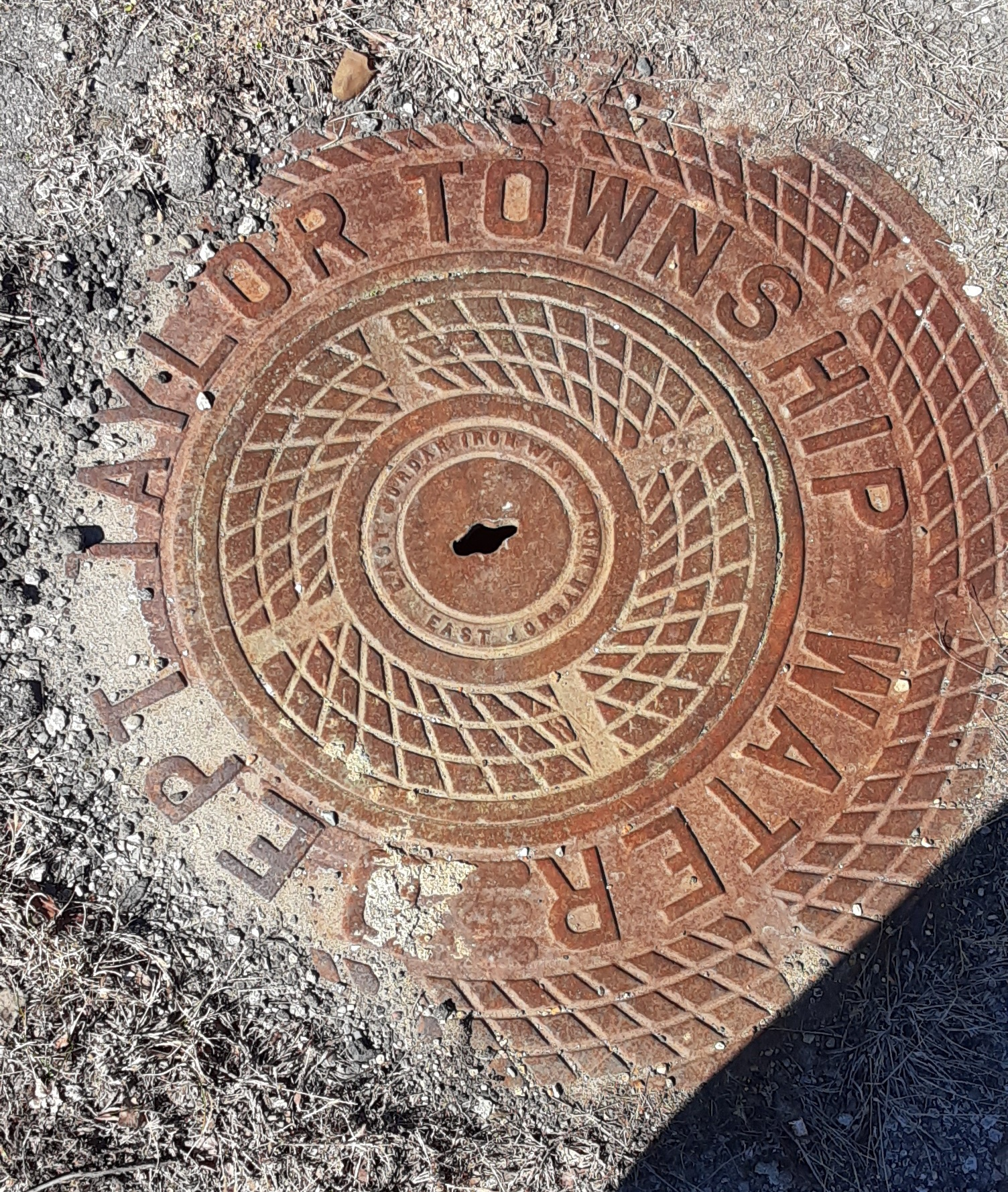
From top: Map of Taylor Township in 1891; A Taylor Township manhole cover.

In 1882, German settlers in Taylor built the West Mound United Methodist Church on Eureka Road. The church sat located on Eureka Road until 1994 when it was sold to the city and relocated to Heritage Park. The church had a major fire in 2020 while construction work was being done.

In 1954, the first American Bektashi Sufi lodge with significant support from the Albanian-American community of the Detroit area.

=== City formation and incorporation ===
On November 8, 1966, citizens voted in favor of the township becoming the City of Taylor, however, the city would not be officially incorporated until March 6, 1968, when the city's charter was officially approved by then-governor George W. Romney a few years after the city's founding.

=== Recent history ===
President Bill Clinton attended the commemoration ceremony for the new Department of Public works building grand opening in 1996.

During the middle of 2005 in preparation for Super Bowl XL in Detroit the following year, a large blue bridge was built at the intersection of Telegraph Road and I-94. It is known as the Gateway Bridge and was claimed to be Detroit's "new icon" by STRUCTURE Magazine in 2006.

President Barack Obama visited the city while campaigning in 2008.

Corporal Matthew Edwards with the Taylor Police Department died from a fatal gunshot wound after responding to a burglary in an apartment complex in mid-2010. Edwards funeral saw participation from many local and federal law enforcement agencies during the procession.

In 2019, the FBI began a federal investigation of then Mayor Rick Sollars and the City of Taylor for corruption. The FBI raided the City Hall along with the then mayor's residence. The former mayor and city are currently still under investigation. At least one city official has pleaded guilty to bribery, as well as a local party store owner, and a local real estate developer as a result of the investigation.

The Taylor North Little League team qualified for the championship game at the 2021 Little League World Series, where they defeated a team from Hamilton, Ohio, becoming the first champion from Michigan since a team from Hamtramck won the 1959 edition of the tournament.

== Geography ==
According to the United States Census Bureau, the city has a total area of 23.63 square miles (61.20 km^{2}), of which 23.60 square miles (61.12 km^{2}) is land and 0.03 square miles (0.08 km^{2}) (0.13%) is water.

=== Climate ===
Taylor has continental climate, meaning that it has cold winters and humid summers like many other places in the Great Lakes region. Taylor's climate is unsurprisingly close to that of Detroit.

Climate data for Taylor, Michigan
| Month | Jan | Feb | Mar | Apr | May | Jun | Jul | Aug | Sep | Oct | Nov | Dec | Year |
|---|---|---|---|---|---|---|---|---|---|---|---|---|---|
| Mean daily maximum °F (°C) | 32 (0) | 34 (1) | 46 (8) | 59 (15) | 70 (21) | 79 (26) | 84 (29) | 82 (28) | 74 (23) | 62 (17) | 49 (9) | 36 (2) | 59 (15) |
| Mean daily minimum °F (°C) | 18 (−8) | 19 (−7) | 28 (−2) | 38 (3) | 49 (9) | 58 (14) | 63 (17) | 62 (17) | 54 (12) | 43 (6) | 33 (1) | 24 (−4) | 41 (5) |
Source: National Weather Service

=== Main highways ===
- I-75 travels through the southeast corner of the city between Racho and Allen Roads.
- I-94 runs east–west through the northern part of the city between Van Born and Ecorse Roads.
- US 24, which is Telegraph Road, runs north–south through the city center, acting as the main thoroughfare in the city.

==== Other main roads ====
- Eureka Road is an important east–west artery in the city, which holds Taylor's shopping district and intersects I-75.
- Van Born Road forms the northern border of Taylor, shared with Dearborn Heights. Just east of Taylor's city limits, the road curves north and becomes Southfield Freeway.
- Goddard Road runs east–west through the center of the city and holds Taylor's municipal buildings near its intersection with Telegraph.
- Northline Road runs east–west a mile south of Goddard and holds Wayne County Community College, as well as the southern entrance to the Heritage Park
- Allen Road and Pelham Road both form Taylor's eastern border. Allen Road travels north–south as Taylor's border with Southgate and then veers north-east into Allen Park, at which point Taylor's border with Allen Park becomes Pelham Road.
- Inkster Road and Pennsylvania Road form Taylor's western and southern borders, respectively.

=== Neighboring communities ===
The City of Taylor is bordered by seven other communities.

== Demographics ==
Historical population
| Census | Pop. | Note | %± |
|---|---|---|---|
| 1970 | 70,020 | | — |
| 1980 | 77,568 | | 10.8% |
| 1990 | 70,811 | | −8.7% |
| 2000 | 65,868 | | −7.0% |
| 2010 | 63,131 | | −4.2% |
| 2020 | 63,409 | | 0.4% |
U.S. Decennial Census; 2018 Estimate

=== Racial and ethnic composition ===
Taylor city, Michigan – Racial and ethnic composition Note: the US Census treats Hispanic/Latino as an ethnic category. This table excludes Latinos from the racial categories and assigns them to a separate category. Hispanics/Latinos may be of any race.
| Race / Ethnicity (NH = Non-Hispanic) | Pop 2000 | Pop 2010 | Pop 2020 | % 2000 | % 2010 | % 2020 |
|---|---|---|---|---|---|---|
| White alone (NH) | 55,338 | 47,177 | 40,464 | 84.01% | 74.73% | 63.81% |
| Black or African American alone (NH) | 5,721 | 9,896 | 12,567 | 8.69% | 15.68% | 19.82% |
| Native American or Alaska Native alone (NH) | 403 | 285 | 220 | 0.61% | 0.45% | 0.35% |
| Asian alone (NH) | 1,064 | 1,111 | 1,351 | 1.62% | 1.76% | 2.13% |
| Native Hawaiian or Pacific Islander alone (NH) | 19 | 16 | 22 | 0.03% | 0.03% | 0.03% |
| Other race alone (NH) | 77 | 84 | 256 | 0.12% | 0.13% | 0.40% |
| Mixed race or Multiracial (NH) | 1,115 | 1,353 | 3,523 | 1.69% | 2.14% | 5.56% |
| Hispanic or Latino (any race) | 2,131 | 3,209 | 5,006 | 3.24% | 5.08% | 7.89% |
| Total | 65,868 | 63,131 | 63,409 | 100.00% | 100.00% | 100.00% |

=== 2020 census ===
As of the 2020 census, Taylor had a population of 63,409. The median age was 38.4 years. 22.0% of residents were under the age of 18 and 15.6% of residents were 65 years of age or older. For every 100 females there were 92.6 males, and for every 100 females age 18 and over there were 89.3 males age 18 and over.

100.0% of residents lived in urban areas, while 0.0% lived in rural areas.

There were 25,596 households in Taylor, of which 29.5% had children under the age of 18 living in them. Of all households, 36.0% were married-couple households, 20.8% were households with a male householder and no spouse or partner present, and 34.1% were households with a female householder and no spouse or partner present. About 29.4% of all households were made up of individuals and 11.1% had someone living alone who was 65 years of age or older.

There were 26,770 housing units, of which 4.4% were vacant. The homeowner vacancy rate was 1.3% and the rental vacancy rate was 4.1%.

Racial composition as of the 2020 census
| Race | Number | Percent |
|---|---|---|
| White | 41,900 | 66.1% |
| Black or African American | 12,737 | 20.1% |
| American Indian and Alaska Native | 333 | 0.5% |
| Asian | 1,361 | 2.1% |
| Native Hawaiian and Other Pacific Islander | 27 | 0.0% |
| Some other race | 1,699 | 2.7% |
| Two or more races | 5,352 | 8.4% |

=== 2010 census ===
As of the census of 2010, there were 63,131 people, 24,370 households, and 16,700 families residing in the city. The population density was 2,675.0 inhabitants per square mile (1,032.8/km^{2}). There were 26,422 housing units at an average density of 1,119.6 per square mile (432.3/km^{2}). The racial makeup of the city was 78.0% White, 15.8% African American, 0.5% Native American, 1.8% Asian, 1.3% from other races, and 2.6% from two or more races. Hispanic or Latino of any race were 5.1% of the population.

There were 24,370 households, of which 35.3% had children under the age of 18 living with them, 41.4% were married couples living together, 20.4% had a female householder with no husband present, 6.8% had a male householder with no wife present, and 31.5% were non-families. 25.5% of all households were made up of individuals, and 9.1% had someone living alone who was 65 years of age or older. The average household size was 2.56 and the average family size was 3.05.

The median age in the city was 36.9 years. 24.7% of residents were under the age of 18; 10.1% were between the ages of 18 and 24; 26.5% were from 25 to 44; 26.1% were from 45 to 64; and 12.8% were 65 years of age or older. The gender makeup of the city was 47.9% male and 52.1% female.

=== 2000 census ===
As of the census of 2000, there were 65,868 people, 24,776 households, and 17,739 families residing in the city. The population density was 2,789.8 inhabitants per square mile (1,077.1/km^{2}). There were 25,905 housing units at an average density of 1,097.2 per square mile (423.6/km^{2}). The racial makeup of the city was 86.13% White, 8.75% African American, 0.68% Native American, 1.63% Asian, 0.03% Pacific Islander, 0.75% from other races, and 2.04% from two or more races. Hispanic or Latino of any race were 3.24% of the population.

There were 24,776 households, out of which 34.9% had children under the age of 18 living with them, 48.7% were married couples living together, 17.4% had a female householder with no husband present, and 28.4% were non-families. 23.1% of all households were made up of individuals, and 7.6% had someone living alone who was 65 years of age or older. The average household size was 2.63 and the average family size was 3.09.

In the city, the population was spread out, with 27.2% under the age of 18, 9.3% from 18 to 24, 31.0% from 25 to 44, 21.5% from 45 to 64, and 11.0% who were 65 years of age or older. The median age was 34 years. For every 100 females, there were 93.2 males. For every 100 females age 18 and over, there were 89.3 males.

The median income for a household in the city was $42,944, and the median income for a family was $48,304. Males had a median income of $41,170 versus $25,999 for females. The per capita income for the city was $19,638. About 8.9% of families and 10.8% of the population were below the poverty line, including 16.3% of those under age 18 and 6.5% of those age 65 or over.

== Economy ==
In addition to its schools, the Downriver Campus of the Wayne County Community College District, churches, parks, golf courses, recreation center, library, and the Oakwood Health System's Heritage Hospital, Taylor also has commercial and industrial sectors, restaurants, and shopping. Southland Center, a regional shopping mall with over 100 stores, was opened in 1970 at Eureka Road and Pardee Road. In 2014, it was announced that the 80 acre property located at Eureka Road and I-75 which previously held the Gibraltar Trade Center would be redeveloped into what became Trader's Pointe, which opened in June 2018.

Taylor had also been the home to the headquarters of Masco Corporation, the 13th largest publicly traded company in Michigan. The company has been headquartered in Taylor since its foundation in 1929 by Alex Manoogian. However, in 2015 it was announced the company would be moving out of the city. The property is being leased by Ford Motor Company in an announcement released in April 2017.

Taylor Lanes has hosted numerous ten-pin bowling championships on the Professional Bowlers Association's PBA Tour, beginning with the 1985 Budweiser Open. The tour stops have included the Greater Detroit Open, Motor City Classic, Ultimate Scoring Championship, and a PBA World Championship major event (2005). The property was sold in 2016 to Life Bridge Church, with the church preserving six of the center's 48 lanes for congregational use.

== Education ==
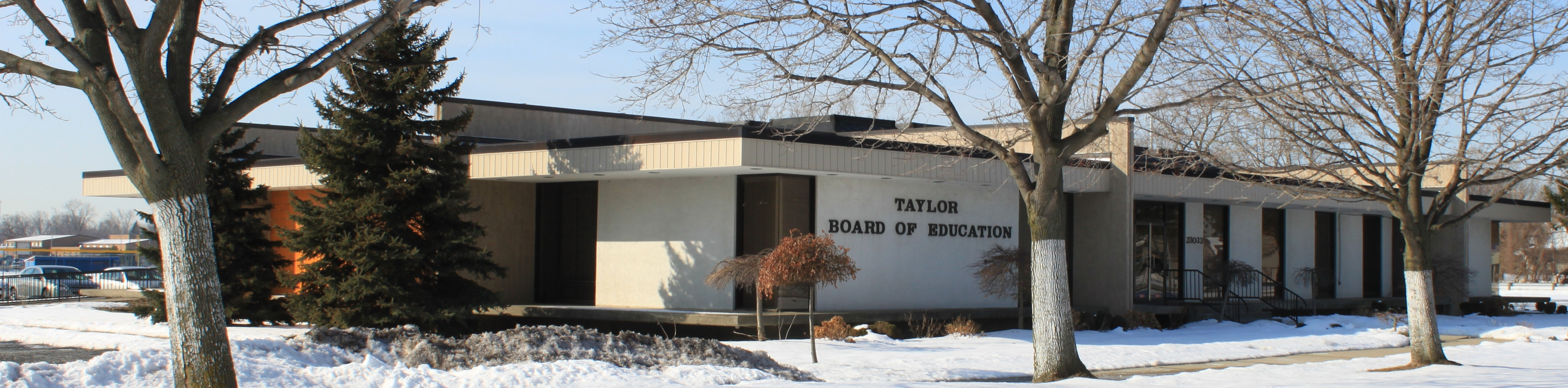
Taylor Board of Education

The city is served by the Taylor School District, within which there is only one high school: Taylor High School (formerly, Harry S. Truman High School) on Beech Daly Road. Other educational facilities include:

- Taylor Preparatory High School
- Taylor Exemplar Academy
- Trillium Academy
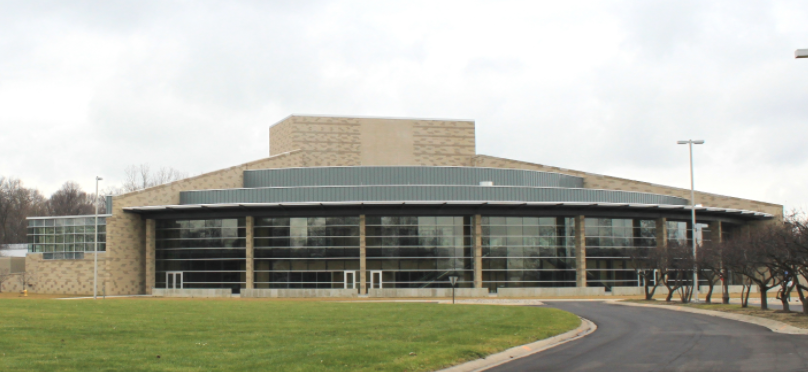
- The Downriver campus of Wayne County Community College District is located in Taylor
  Wayne County Community College District

The Roman Catholic Archdiocese of Detroit previously operated St. Cyril Elementary School, St. Pascal Elementary School, and St. Alfred Elementary School in Taylor. The former two merged in 2000 forming Taylor Catholic School, before closing down in 2007. In 2011, the archdiocese announced that St. Alfred would close. In 2013, the archdiocese sold the attached part of the St. Alfred Elementary to PrepNet Schools and formed Taylor Preparatory Charter High school and walled off the hallways connecting to the main church hall of St. Alfred's.

== Notable people ==
- Steve Avery, retired Major League Baseball player for the Atlanta Braves, Boston Red Sox, Cincinnati Reds and Detroit Tigers
- Steven Yeun, actor known from the TV series The Walking Dead
- Joe C., musician and rapper mostly notably associated with Kid Rock
- Wayne Presley, retired National Hockey League player for the Chicago Blackhawks and Buffalo Sabres
- Earl Jones, track and field athlete, winner of a bronze medal at 1984 Summer Olympics
- Mike Howe, heavy metal singer who performs with Metal Church
- Ted Daisher, current college and former National Football League coach
- Mandalynn Carlson, actress known for the film Machine Gun Preacher
- Bliss 66, rock band
- Tyler Blevins (known as Ninja), American gamer and streamer
- Alex Garza, Mexican-American politician
