= List of Little League World Series champions by division =

This article details the list of Little League World Series winners by division. There are currently four World Series tournaments played each summer.

== Little League Baseball Divisions ==
Division	Current Location	First held	Age of players
Little League Baseball (World Series)	South Williamsport, Pennsylvania	1947	10–12 years old
Intermediate League Baseball (World Series)	Livermore, California	2013	11–13 years old
Junior League Baseball (World Series)	Taylor, Michigan	1981	13–14 years old
Senior League Baseball (World Series)	Easley, South Carolina	1961	13–16 years old
Big League Baseball (World Series)†	various	1968	15–18 years old

† Discontinued after 2016

== Champions by year ==
Year	Little	Intermediate	Junior	Senior	Big
1947	Williamsport, Pennsylvania	First Held in 2013	First Held in 1981	First Held in 1961	First Held in 1968
1948	Lock Haven, Pennsylvania	Not Yet Created	Not Yet Created	Not Yet Created	Not Yet Created
1949	Hammonton, New Jersey	Not Yet Created	Not Yet Created	Not Yet Created	Not Yet Created
1950	Houston, E. Texas	Not Yet Created	Not Yet Created	Not Yet Created	Not Yet Created
1951	Stamford, Connecticut	Not Yet Created	Not Yet Created	Not Yet Created	Not Yet Created
1952	Norwalk, Connecticut	Not Yet Created	Not Yet Created	Not Yet Created	Not Yet Created
1953	Birmingham, Alabama	Not Yet Created	Not Yet Created	Not Yet Created	Not Yet Created
1954	(New York (state)) Schenectady, New York	Not Yet Created	Not Yet Created	Not Yet Created	Not Yet Created
1955	Morrisville, Pennsylvania	Not Yet Created	Not Yet Created	Not Yet Created	Not Yet Created
1956	Roswell, New Mexico	Not Yet Created	Not Yet Created	Not Yet Created	Not Yet Created
1957	Monterrey, Mexico	Not Yet Created	Not Yet Created	Not Yet Created	Not Yet Created
1958	Monterrey, Mexico	Not Yet Created	Not Yet Created	Not Yet Created	Not Yet Created
1959	Hamtramck, Michigan	Not Yet Created	Not Yet Created	Not Yet Created	Not Yet Created
1960	Levittown, Pennsylvania	Not Yet Created	Not Yet Created	Not Yet Created	Not Yet Created
1961	El Cajon, S. California	Not Yet Created	Not Yet Created	Natrona Heights, Pennsylvania	Not Yet Created
1962	San Jose, N. California	Not Yet Created	Not Yet Created	(New York (state)) West Hempstead, New York	Not Yet Created
1963	Granada Hills, S. California	Not Yet Created	Not Yet Created	Monterrey, Mexico	Not Yet Created
1964	(New York (state)) Staten Island, New York	Not Yet Created	Not Yet Created	(New York (state)) Massapequa, New York	Not Yet Created
1965	Windsor Locks, Connecticut	Not Yet Created	Not Yet Created	Monterrey, Mexico	Not Yet Created
1966	Houston, E. Texas	Not Yet Created	Not Yet Created	(New York (state)) East Rochester, New York	Not Yet Created
1967	West Tokyo, Japan	Not Yet Created	Not Yet Created	(New York (state)) Westbury, New York	Not Yet Created
1968	Wakayama, Japan	Not Yet Created	Not Yet Created	(New York (state)) New Hyde Park, New York	Charleston, West Virginia
1969	Taichung, Taiwan	Not Yet Created	Not Yet Created	Sacramento, N. California	Barstow, S. California
1970	Wayne, New Jersey	Not Yet Created	Not Yet Created	Tampa, Florida	Lincolnwood, Illinois
1971	Tainan, Taiwan	Not Yet Created	Not Yet Created	La Habra, S. California	Cupertino, N. California
1972	Taipei, Taiwan	Not Yet Created	Not Yet Created	Pingtung, Taiwan	Orlando, Florida
1973	Tainan, Taiwan	Not Yet Created	Not Yet Created	Taipei, Taiwan	Lincolnwood, Illinois
1974	Kaohsiung, Taiwan	Not Yet Created	Not Yet Created	Pingtung, Taiwan	Taipei, Taiwan
1975	Lakewood, New Jersey *	Not Yet Created	Not Yet Created	Pingtung, Taiwan	Taipei, Taiwan
1976	Tokyo, Japan	Not Yet Created	Not Yet Created	Pingtung, Taiwan	Taipei, Taiwan
1977	Kaohsiung, Taiwan	Not Yet Created	Not Yet Created	Taipei, Taiwan	Taipei, Taiwan
1978	Pingtung, Taiwan	Not Yet Created	Not Yet Created	Hualien, Taiwan	Taipei, Taiwan
1979	Chiayi, Taiwan	Not Yet Created	Not Yet Created	Taichung, Taiwan	(New York (state)) West Hempstead, New York
1980	Hualien, Taiwan	Not Yet Created	Not Yet Created	Pingtung, Taiwan	Buena Park, S. California
1981	Taichung, Taiwan	Not Yet Created	Boardman, Ohio	Georgetown, Delaware	Taipei, Taiwan
1982	(Washington (state)) Kirkland, Washington	Not Yet Created	Tampa, Florida	Santa Barbara, S. California	San Juan, Puerto Rico
1983	(Georgia (U.S. state)) Marietta, Georgia	Not Yet Created	Manatí, Puerto Rico	Pingtung, Taiwan	Taipei, Taiwan
1984	Seoul, South Korea	Not Yet Created	Pearl City, Hawaii	Altamonte Springs, Florida	Taipei, Taiwan
1985	Seoul, South Korea	Not Yet Created	Tampa, Florida	Pingtung, Taiwan	Broward County, Florida (H)
1986	Tainan, Taiwan	Not Yet Created	Waldorf, Maryland	Taipei, Taiwan	Maracaibo, Venezuela
1987	Hualien, Taiwan	Not Yet Created	Rowland Heights, S. California	Athens, Ohio	Taipei, Taiwan
1988	Taichung, Taiwan	Not Yet Created	Mexicali, Mexico	Pingtung, Taiwan	Taipei, Taiwan
1989	Trumbull, Connecticut	Not Yet Created	Manatí, Puerto Rico	Pingtung, Taiwan	Taipei, Taiwan
1990	Tainan, Taiwan	Not Yet Created	Yabucoa, Puerto Rico	Pingtung, Taiwan	Taipei, Taiwan
1991	Taichung, Taiwan	Not Yet Created	Spring, E. Texas	Pingtung, Taiwan	Taipei, Taiwan
1992	Long Beach, S. California	Not Yet Created	Tucson, Arizona	Pingtung, Taiwan	Broward County, Florida (H)
1993	Long Beach, S. California	Not Yet Created	Cayey, Puerto Rico	La Vega, Dominican Republic	Taipei, Taiwan
1994	Maracaibo, Venezuela	Not Yet Created	Thousand Oaks, S. California	Brandon, Florida	Taipei, Taiwan
1995	Tainan, Taiwan	Not Yet Created	Lake Charles, Louisiana	Dunedin, Florida	Tainan, Taiwan
1996	Kaohsiung, Taiwan	Not Yet Created	Spring, E. Texas	Maracaibo, Venezuela	Kaohsiung, Taiwan
1997	Guadalupe, Mexico	Not Yet Created	Salem, New Hampshire	San Francisco, Venezuela	Broward County, Florida (H)
1998	Toms River, New Jersey	Not Yet Created	Mission Viejo, S. California	Diamond Bar, S. California	Thousand Oaks, S. California
1999	Hirakata, Japan	Not Yet Created	Arroyo, Puerto Rico	Conway, Florida (H)	Orlando, Florida
2000	Maracaibo, Venezuela	Not Yet Created	Aiea, Hawaii	Panama City, Panama	Fraser Valley, Canada
2001	Tokyo, Japan	Not Yet Created	Aiea, Hawaii	Palm Harbor, Florida	Westminster, S. California
2002	Louisville, Kentucky	Not Yet Created	(Georgia (U.S. state)) Cartersville, Georgia	Willemstad, Curaçao	San Juan, Puerto Rico
2003	Tokyo, Japan	Not Yet Created	La Mirada, S. California	Hilo, Hawaii	Easley, South Carolina (H)
2004	Willemstad, Curaçao	Not Yet Created	Tampa, Florida	Freehold Township, New Jersey	Easley, South Carolina (H)
2005	ʻEwa Beach, Hawaii	Not Yet Created	Panama City, Panama	Urbandale, Iowa	Easley, South Carolina (H)
2006	(Georgia (U.S. state)) Columbus, Georgia	Not Yet Created	El Campo, E. Texas	Falcón, Venezuela	Thousand Oaks, S. California
2007	(Georgia (U.S. state)) Warner Robins, Georgia	Not Yet Created	Pearl City, Hawaii	(Georgia (U.S. state)) Cartersville, Georgia	Easley, South Carolina (H)
2008	Waipahu, Hawaii	Not Yet Created	Willemstad, Curaçao	Upper Deerfield, New Jersey	Taylors, South Carolina
2009	Chula Vista, S. California	Not Yet Created	Scottsdale, Arizona	Houston, E. Texas	Santiago, Dominican Republic
2010	Tokyo, Japan	Not Yet Created	Taipei, Taiwan	San Nicolaas, Aruba	San Juan, Puerto Rico
2011	Huntington Beach, S. California	Not Yet Created	Tampa, Florida	Hilo, Hawaii	Taylors, South Carolina
2012	Tokyo, Japan	Not Yet Created	Rockledge, Florida	Guatemala City, Guatemala	San Juan, Puerto Rico
2013	Tokyo, Japan	Osaka, Japan	Taoyuan, Taiwan	Chitré, Panama	Greenville County, South Carolina
2014	Seoul, South Korea	Nogales, Arizona	Taichung, Taiwan	Houston, E. Texas	Clearwater, Florida
2015	Tokyo, Japan	Seoul, South Korea	Taichung, Taiwan	Houston, E. Texas	Guayama, Puerto Rico
2016	(New York (state)) Maine–Endwell, New York	Wailuku, Hawaii	Taoyuan, Taiwan	Chicago, Illinois	Taoyuan, Taiwan
2017	Tokyo, Japan	Guayama, Puerto Rico	Taoyuan, Taiwan	Aguadulce, Panama	Discontinued in 2016
2018	Honolulu, Hawaii	Seoul, South Korea	Taoyuan, Taiwan	Willemstad, Curaçao	No Longer Held
2019	River Ridge, Louisiana	McCalla, Alabama	Fullerton, S. California	Wailuku, Hawaii	No Longer Held
2020	Cancelled due to COVID-19 pandemic				No Longer Held
2021	Taylor, Michigan	Cancelled due to COVID-19 pandemic			No Longer Held
2022	Honolulu, Hawaii	Danville, N. California (H)	Taichung, Taiwan	Guayama, Puerto Rico	No Longer Held
2023	El Segundo, S. California	Seoul, South Korea	Taoyuan, Taiwan	Willemstad, Curaçao	No Longer Held
2024	Lake Mary, Florida	Kenner, Louisiana	Taoyuan, Taiwan	Maracaibo, Venezuela	No Longer Held
2025	Taipei, Taiwan	Valencia, Venezuela	Taichung, Taiwan	Guaynabo, Puerto Rico	No Longer Held
2026	Willemstad, Curaçao	Seoul, South Korea	La Mirada, S. California	Pearl City, Hawaii	No Longer Held
Year	Little	Intermediate	Junior	Senior	Big

- International teams were banned from the Little League World Series in 1975 (political controversy after repeated Taiwanese wins) and 2021 (travel restrictions from pandemic).
- (H) Host team

== Statistics ==
=== World Series won by Country/State ===
Rank	Country/State	Total	Little	Intermediate	Junior	Senior	Big
1	Taiwan	64	18	0	11	17	18
2	Southern California	21	7	0	6	3	5
3	Florida	14	1	0	5	5	3
4	Hawaii	13	4	1	4	4	0
4	Puerto Rico	13	0	1	5	2	5
6	Japan	12	11	1	0	0	0
7	(New York (state)) New York	9	3	0	0	5	1
7	(Florida) (South Carolina) (California) Host Team(s)	9	—	1	0	1	7
9	Venezuela	8	2	1	0	4	1
9	East Texas	8	2	0	3	3	0
11	South Korea	7	3	4	0	0	0
12	New Jersey	6	4	0	0	2	0
12	Mexico	6	3	0	1	2	0
12	Curaçao	6	2	0	1	3	0
15	Pennsylvania	5	4	0	0	1	0
15	(Georgia (U.S. state)) Georgia	5	3	0	1	1	0
17	Connecticut	4	4	0	0	0	0
17	Panama	4	0	0	1	3	0
19	Louisiana	3	1	1	1	0	0
19	Northern California	3	1	0	0	1	1
19	Arizona	3	0	1	2	0	0
19	Illinois	3	0	0	0	1	2
19	South Carolina	3	0	0	0	0	3
24	Michigan	2	2	0	0	0	0
24	Alabama	2	1	1	0	0	0
24	Ohio	2	0	0	1	1	0
24	Dominican Republic	2	0	0	0	1	1
28	New Mexico	1	1	0	0	0	0
28	(Washington (state)) Washington	1	1	0	0	0	0
28	Kentucky	1	1	0	0	0	0
28	Maryland	1	0	0	1	0	0
28	New Hampshire	1	0	0	1	0	0
28	Delaware	1	0	0	0	1	0
28	Iowa	1	0	0	0	1	0
28	Aruba	1	0	0	0	1	0
28	Guatemala	1	0	0	0	1	0
28	West Virginia	1	0	0	0	0	1
28	Canada	1	0	0	0	0	1
Rank	Country/State	Total	Little	Intermediate	Junior	Senior	Big

=== Most titles by tournament ===
All–Time

World Series	Country / State	Wins	Last win
Little	Taiwan	18	2025
Intermediate	South Korea	4	2026
Junior	Taiwan	11	2025
Senior	Taiwan	17	1992
Big	Taiwan	18	2016

Consecutive

World Series	Country / State	Wins	Span
Little	Taiwan	5	1977—1981
Junior	Taiwan	6	2013—2018
Senior	Taiwan	9	1972—1980
Big	Taiwan	5	1974—1978
Big	Taiwan	5	1987—1991

- The Intermediate World Series has yet to have a repeat champion

=== Winners of three World Series tournaments in the same year ===
Little / Senior / Big	Year
Taiwan	1974^{^}, 1977^{^}, 1978^{^}, 1988, 1990, 1991

- ^ Won at every World Series level

Junior / Senior / Big	Year
Southern California	1998

=== Winners of two World Series tournaments in the same year ===
Little / Intermediate	Year
Japan	2013

Little / Junior	Year
Taiwan	2025

Little / Senior	Year
(New York (state)) New York	1964
Taiwan	1972, 1973, 1979, 1980, 1986
(Georgia (U.S. state)) Georgia	2007

Little / Big	Year
Taiwan	1981, 1987, 1995, 1996

Junior / Big	Year
Taiwan	2016

Senior / Big	Year
Taiwan	1975^, 1976, 1983, 1989

- ^ Won at every World Series level
