= 2009 Little League Philippine Series =

The 2009 Little League Philippine Series was held from April 13 to 19, 2009. The venue of the tournament was the city of Manila. 91 teams joined in the various baseball and softball age divisions of Little League. This is an annual event and winners represent Little League Philippines at the Asia Pacific Regional Tournaments held in June and July.

== Little League Baseball (11 to 12 Years Old) ==
=== First round standings ===
Group A	Wins	Losses	
Calamba, Laguna	3	1	Advances to Playoff
Muntinlupa	3	1	Advances to Playoff
Nueva Ecija	3	1	
Batangas	1	3	
Mountain Province	0	4	

Group B	Wins	Losses	
Marikina	4	0	Advances to Playoff
Cavite	3	1	Advances to Playoff
Pook Agoncillo, Batangas	2	2	
North Samar	1	3	
Makati	0	4	

Group C	Wins	Losses	
Tanauan, Batangas	4	0	Advances to Playoff
Los Banos	3	1	Advances to Playoff
Zamboanga	2	2	
Bacolod West	1	3	
Rizal	0	4	

Group D	Wins	Losses	
ILLAM	4	0	Advances to Playoff
Manila	2	2	Advances to Playoff
Camarines Sur	2	2	
Camarines Norte	1	3	
Bacolod East, Negros Occ.	1	3	

Group E	Wins	Losses	
General Trias	3	0	Advances to Playoff
Caloocan	2	1	Advances to Playoff
Baguio	1	2	
Tacloban	0	3	

Group F	Wins	Losses	
Kalinga	3	0	Advances to Playoff
Valenzuela	2	1	Advances to Playoff
Santa Cruz, Laguna	1	2	
Ilocos Norte	0	3	

Group G	Wins	Losses	
Bulacan	3	0	Advances to Playoff
Antipolo	2	1	Advances to Playoff
Floridablanca, Pampanga	1	2	
Pasig	0	3	

Group H	Wins	Losses	
Lipa, Batangas	3	0	Advances to Playoff
Taguig	2	1	Advances to Playoff
Quezon City	1	2	
Isabela	0	3	

== Playoffs ==
=== Round of 16 April 18 ===
Lipa, Batangas 13 Manila 1

ILLAM 6 Los Banos 5

Cavite 14 Kalinga 0

Tanauan, Batangas 17 Caloocan 9

Marikina 19 Valenzuela 0

Bulacan 14 Taguig 1

Calamba, Laguna 13 Antipolo 3

Muntinlupa 21 General Trias 10

=== Quarter-final April 18 ===
Marikina 11 Bulacan 1

Cavite 5 Tanauan, Batangas 4

ILLAM 16 Lipa, Batangas 2

Muntinlupa 7 Calamba, Laguna 6

=== Semi-finals April 19 ===
Muntinlupa 10 Marikina 2

ILLAM 19 Cavite 9

=== Championship April 19 ===
ILLAM 9 Muntinlupa 2

== Junior League Baseball (13-14 Years Old) ==
Group A	Wins	Losses	
Muntinlupa	5	0	Advance to Semi-final
Tanauan, Batangas	4	1	Advance to Semi-final
Bacolod East	3	2	
Pook Agoncillo	2	3	
Batangas	1	4	
Tacloban	0	5	

Group B	Wins	Losses	
ILLAM	6	0	Advance to Semi-final
Marikina	5	1	Advance to Semi-final
Lipa	4	2	
Antipolo	3	3	
Taguig	2	4	
Camarines Norte	1	5	
Kalinga	0	6	

=== Semi-final ===
Muntinlupa 4 Marikina 3

Tanauan 12 ILLAM 10

=== Championship ===
Muntinlupa 12 Tanauan 1

== Senior League Baseball (14-16 Years Old) ==
	Wins	Losses	
ILLAM	7	0	Advance to Championship
Tanauan, Batangas	6	1	Advance to Championship
Muntinlupa	5	2	
Zamboanga	4	3	
Antipolo	3	4	
Batangas	2	5	
Camarines Norte	1	6	
North Samar	0	7	

=== Championship ===
ILLAM 15 Tanauan 5

== Big League Baseball (16-18 Years Old) ==
	Wins	Losses	
ILLAM	5	0	Advance to Championship
Tanauan	4	1	Advance to Championship
Makati	3	2	
North Samar	2	3	
Taguig	1	4	
Camarines Norte	0	5	

=== Championship ===
Tanauan 3 ILLAM 2

== Little League Softball (11-12 Years Old) ==
Group A	Wins	Losses	
Palayan	3	0	Advance to Second round
ILLAM	2	1	Advance to Second round
Valenzuela	1	2	
Mountain Province	0	3	

Group B	Wins	Losses	
Cavite	3	1	Advance to Second round
Muntinlupa	3	1	Advance to Second round
Bacolod West	3	1	
Caloocan	1	3	
Manila	0	4	

Second round	Wins	Losses	
Cavite	2	1	Advance to Championship
Palayan	2	1	Advance to Championship
Muntinlupa	1	2	
ILLAM	1	2	

=== Championship ===
Cavite 12 Palayan 11

== Junior League Softball (13-14 Years Old) ==
	Wins	Losses	
ILLAM	6	0	Advance to Championship
Bacolod East	5	1	Advance to Championship
Muntinlupa	3	3	
Antipolo	3	3	
Makati	3	3	
Manila	1	5	
Valenzuela	0	6	

=== Championship ===
ILLAM 5 Bacolod East 2

== Senior League Softball (13-16 Years Old) ==
	Wins	Losses	
Bacolod West	6	0	Advance to Championship
ILLAM	5	1	Advance to Championship
Cavite	4	2	
Pasig	3	3	
Valenzuela	2	4	
Antipolo	1	5	
Makati	0	6	

=== Championship ===
ILLAM 7 Bacolod West 2

== Big League Softball ==
	Wins	Losses	
Rizal	6	2	Advance to Championship
ILLAM/Manila	6	2	Advance to Championship
Santa Cruz, Laguna	5	3	
Caloocan	3	5	
Bacolod East	0	8	

=== Championship ===
Rizal 3 ILLAM 2

== See also ==
- 2008 Little League Philippine Series
- Junior, Senior & Big League Baseball
