= 2018 World Series (disambiguation) =

The 2018 World Series was the championship series of Major League Baseball's 2018 season.

2018 World Series may also refer to:

- 2018 Little League World Series (baseball)
- 2018 Intermediate League World Series (baseball)
- 2018 Junior League World Series (baseball)
- 2018 Senior League World Series (baseball)
- 2018 College World Series (baseball)
- 2018 World Club Series (rugby league)
- 2018 World Series of Poker
- 2018 Fast5 Netball World Series
