= Intermediate League World Series (Asia–Pacific Region) =

Asia–Pacific Region
- Most recent season or competition: 2026 Intermediate League World Series
- Sport: Baseball
- Founded: 2013
- Most recent champion: Seoul, South Korea
- Most titles: South Korea (11)

The Intermediate League World Series Asia–Pacific Region is one of six International regions that currently sends teams to the World Series in Livermore, California. The region's participation in the ILWS dates back to 2013.

== Asia–Pacific Region Countries ==
- China
- Hong Kong
- India
- Japan
- New Zealand
- South Korea
- Philippines

== Region Champions ==
As of the 2026 Intermediate League World Series.

Year	City	ILWS	Record
2013	Osaka, Japan	Champions	4–0
2014	Gyeonggi, South Korea	Round 3	2–2
2015	Seoul, South Korea	Champions	5–0
2016	Seoul, South Korea	Runner-up	3–1
2017	Seoul, South Korea	Round 3	1–2
2018	Seoul, South Korea	Champions	5–0
2019	Seoul, South Korea	Int'l Final	3–1
2020	Cancelled due to COVID-19 pandemic		
2021	Cancelled due to COVID-19 pandemic		
2022	Seoul, South Korea	Runner-up	4–1
2023	Seoul, South Korea	Champions	4–1
2024	Seoul, South Korea	Runner-up	4–2
2025	Seoul, South Korea	Round 3	1–2
2026	Seoul, South Korea	Champions	5–1

=== Results by Country ===
As of the 2026 Intermediate League World Series.

Country	Region Championships	ILWS Championships	W–L	PCT
South Korea	11	4	37–13	.740
Japan	1	1	4–0	1.000
Total	12	5	41–13	.759

== See also ==
Asia-Pacific Region in other Little League divisions

- Little League — Far East
  - Asia-Pacific & Middle East
  - Japan
- Junior League
- Senior League
- Big League
