= Intermediate League World Series (East Region) =

East Region
- Most recent season or competition: 2026 Intermediate League World Series
- Sport: Baseball
- Founded: 2013
- No. of teams: 12
- Country: United States
- Most recent champion: West Chester, Pennsylvania
- Most titles: New Jersey (6)

The Intermediate League World Series East Region is one of six United States regions that currently sends teams to the World Series in Livermore, California. The region's participation in the ILWS dates back to 2013.

== East Region States ==
- Connecticut
- Delaware
- Maine
- Maryland
- Massachusetts
- New Hampshire
- New Jersey
- New York
- Pennsylvania
- Rhode Island
- Vermont
- Washington, D.C.

== Region champions ==
As of the 2026 Intermediate League World Series.

Year	City	ILWS	Record
2013	Collier Township, Pennsylvania	Runner-up	4–2
2014	Berlin, Maryland	US Final	3–2
2015	(New York (state)) Commack, New York (Host)	US Final	4–2
2016	Vineland, New Jersey	Round 1	1–2
2017	Freehold Township, New Jersey	Runner-up	4–2
2018	(New York (state)) Commack, New York (Host)	Round 1	1–2
2019	Nutley, New Jersey	Round 1	1–2
2020	Cancelled due to COVID-19 pandemic		
2021	Cancelled due to COVID-19 pandemic		
2022	Toms River, New Jersey	Round 2	1–2
2023	Toms River, New Jersey	Round 3	2–2
2024	Middletown, Delaware	Round 1	0–3
2025	Freehold Township, New Jersey	Round 2	1–2
2026	West Chester, Pennsylvania	Round 1	1–2

=== Results by State ===
As of the 2026 Intermediate League World Series.

State	Region Championships	ILWS Championships	W–L	PCT
New Jersey	6	0	10–12	.455
(New York (state)) Host Team(s)	2	0	5–4	.556
Pennsylvania	2	0	5–4	.556
Maryland	1	0	3–2	.600
Delaware	1	0	0–3	.000
Total	12	0	23–25	.479

== See also ==
East Region in other Little League divisions

- Little League – East 1957-2000
  - Little League – Mid-Atlantic
  - Little League – New England
- Junior League
- Senior League
- Big League
