= 2013 Intermediate League World Series =

Tournament information
- Location: Livermore, California
- Dates: July 30–August 5

Final positions
- Champions: Osaka, Japan
- Runner-up: Collier Township, Pennsylvania

Note: There exists a duplicate article (which does not include the world champion), under the title of 2013 Little League Intermediate World Series.

The 2013 Intermediate League World Series took place from July 30–August 5 in Livermore, California, United States. Osaka, Japan defeated Collier Township, Pennsylvania in the championship game.

This was the inaugural ILWS.

== Teams ==
United States	International
Pleasanton, California; District 57 (Pleasanton National); Host	Osaka, Japan; Izumisano; Asia–Pacific
Jenison, Michigan; Georgetown; Central	Lethbridge, Alberta; Southwest; Canada
Collier Township, Pennsylvania; Collier Township/Chartiers Valley; East	Guayaquil, Ecuador; C Unidas Miraflores; Latin America
Rutherfordton, North Carolina; Rutherfordton; Southeast	Yabucoa, Puerto Rico; Juan Antonio Bibiloni; Puerto Rico
Houston, Texas; Post Oak; Southwest	
Nogales, Arizona; Nogales National; West

== Results ==
United States Bracket

Upper round 1
—	Michigan	0
—	California (F/5)	12
—	Texas	6
—	Pennsylvania	4
Lower round 1
0–1	Arizona	3
0–1	Pennsylvania	7
0–1	Michigan	5
0–1	North Carolina	4

Upper round 2
—	Arizona	3
1–0	California	6
—	North Carolina	1
1–0	Texas (F/5)	12
Lower round 2
1–1	Pennsylvania	4
1–1	Michigan	3

Upper final
2–0	California	5
2–0	Texas	6
Lower final
2–1	California	1
2–1	Pennsylvania	3

United States Championship
3–0	Texas	4
3–1	Pennsylvania	5

International Bracket

First round
—	Ecuador	3
—	Puerto Rico	7
—	Japan (F/5)	19
—	Canada	1
Lower round 1
0–1	Ecuador	5
0–1	Canada	4

Semifinals
1–0	Puerto Rico	0
1–0	Japan (F/6)	10
Lower final
1–1	Puerto Rico	7
1–1	Ecuador	6

International Championship
2–0	Japan (F/6)	12
2–1	Puerto Rico	2

Consolation round

—
0–2	North Carolina	10
0–2	Canada	7

—
0–2	Arizona	4
1–2	Ecuador	3

Elimination Round

Semifinals
3–0	Texas	4
3–1	Pennsylvania	5
2–0	Japan (F/6)	12
2–1	Puerto Rico	2

World Championship
4–1	Pennsylvania	1
3–0	Japan	10

2013 Intermediate League World Series Champions
Izumisano LL
Osaka, Japan
