= 2017 Intermediate League World Series =

Tournament information
- Location: Livermore, California
- Dates: July 30–August 6

Final positions
- Champions: Guayama, Puerto Rico
- Runner-up: Freehold Township, New Jersey

The 2017 Intermediate League World Series took place from July 30–August 6 in Livermore, California, United States. Guayama, Puerto Rico defeated Freehold Township, New Jersey in the championship game.

== Teams ==
United States	International
Danville, California; District 57 (Danville); Host	Seoul, South Korea; West Seoul; Asia–Pacific
Georgetown, Indiana; Highlander Youth Recreation; Central	Mirabel, Quebec; Diamond Baseball; Canada
Freehold Township, New Jersey; Freehold Township; East	Paris, France; Ile-de-France; Europe–Africa
North Palm Beach, Florida; North Palm Beach Country; Southeast	Maracaibo, Venezuela; Cacique Mara; Latin America
San Angelo, Texas; Western; Southwest	Guayama, Puerto Rico; Radames Lopez; Puerto Rico
Wailuku, Hawaii; Central East Maui; West	

== Results ==
United States Bracket

Upper round 1
—	Hawaii	11
—	Florida	9
—	New Jersey	2
—	California	3
Lower round 1
0–1	Florida	11
0–1	Texas	12
0–1	Indiana	2
0–1	New Jersey	7

Upper round 2
—	Indiana	1
1–0	Hawaii (F/5)	13
—	Texas	1
1–0	California	6
Lower round 2
1–1	Texas	0
1–1	New Jersey	2

Upper final
2–0	Hawaii	2
2–0	California	0
Lower final
2–1	California	4
2–1	New Jersey (F/8)	5

United States Championship
3–0	Hawaii	4
3–1	New Jersey (F/9)	6

International Bracket

Upper round 1
—	Venezuela	5
—	Puerto Rico	8
Lower round 1
0–1	Venezuela	7
0–1	France	1

Upper round 2
—	Canada	2
1–0	Puerto Rico	5
—	South Korea	4
—	France	2
Lower round 2
0–1	Canada	3
1–1	Venezuela	6

Upper final
2–0	Puerto Rico	6
1–0	South Korea	4
Lower final
1–1	South Korea	0
2–1	Venezuela	2

International Championship
3–0	Puerto Rico	10
3–1	Venezuela	2

Consolation Round

—
0–2	Florida	10
0–2	France	6

—
0–2	Indiana	0
0–2	Canada	6

Elimination Round

Semifinals
3–0	Hawaii	4
3–1	New Jersey (F/9)	6
3–0	Puerto Rico	10
3–1	Venezuela	2

World Championship
4–1	New Jersey	5
4–0	Puerto Rico	6

2017 Intermediate League World Series Champions
Radames Lopez LL
Guayama, Puerto Rico
