= Intermediate League World Series (Canada Region) =

Canada Region
- Most recent season or competition: 2026 Intermediate League World Series
- Sport: Baseball
- Founded: 2013
- No. of teams: 7
- Most recent champion: Victoria, British Columbia
- Most titles: Quebec (4)

The Intermediate League World Series Canada Region is one of six International regions that currently sends teams to the World Series in Livermore, California. The region's participation in the ILWS dates back to 2013.

== Canada Region Provinces ==
- Alberta
- British Columbia
- New Brunswick
- Nova Scotia
- Ontario
- Quebec
- Saskatchewan

== Region Champions ==
As of the 2026 Intermediate League World Series.

Year	City	ILWS	Record
2013	Lethbridge, Alberta	Round 1	0–3
2014	Surrey, British Columbia	Round 1	1–2
2015	Châteauguay, Quebec	Round 1	1–2
2016	Lethbridge, Alberta	Round 2	2–2
2017	Mirabel, Quebec	Round 2	1–2
2018	Coquitlam/Surrey, British Columbia (Host)	Round 2	1–2
2019	Lethbridge, Alberta	Round 2	1–2
2020	Cancelled due to COVID-19 pandemic		
2021	Cancelled due to COVID-19 pandemic		
2022	Mirabel, Quebec	Round 3	2–2
2023	Vancouver, British Columbia (Host)	Round 2	1–2
2024	Mirabel, Quebec	Round 1	0–3
2025	Coquitlam, British Columbia	Round 1	2–2
2026	Victoria, British Columbia	Round 1	0–3

=== Results by Province ===
As of the 2026 Intermediate League World Series.

Province	Region Championships	ILWS Championships	W–L	PCT
Quebec	4	0	4–9	.308
Alberta	3	0	3–7	.300
British Columbia	3	0	3–7	.300
(British Columbia) Host Team(s)	2	0	2–4	.333
Total	12	0	12–27	.308

== See also ==
- Baseball awards § World
- Baseball awards § Canada

Canada Region in other Little League divisions

- Little League
- Junior League
- Senior League
- Big League
