= Intermediate League World Series (West Region) =

West Region
- Most recent season or competition: 2026 Intermediate League World Series
- Sport: Baseball
- Founded: 2013
- No. of teams: 12
- Country: United States
- Most recent champion: Livermore, California
- Most titles: Hawaii (6)

The Intermediate League World Series West Region is one of six United States regions that currently sends teams to the Intermediate League World Series in Livermore, California. The region's participation in the ILWS dates back to 2013.

== West Region states ==
- Alaska
- Arizona
- California (Northern)
- California (Southern)
- Hawaii
- Idaho
- Montana
- Nevada
- Oregon
- Utah
- Washington
- Wyoming

== Region champions ==
As of the 2026 Intermediate League World Series.

| Year | City | ILWS | Record |
|---|---|---|---|
| 2013 | Nogales, Arizona | Round 1 | 1–2 |
| 2014 | Nogales, Arizona (Host) | Champions | 4–0 |
| 2015 | Kapaa, Hawaii | Round 1 | 1–2 |
| 2016 | Wailuku, Hawaii | Champions | 5–1 |
| 2017 | Wailuku, Hawaii | US Final | 3–1 |
| 2018 | San Diego, Southern California | Round 1 | 2–2 |
| 2019 | Petaluma, Northern California | Round 1 | 0–3 |
| 2020 | Cancelled due to COVID-19 pandemic | | |
| 2021 | Cancelled due to COVID-19 pandemic | | |
| 2022 | Wailuku, Hawaii | US Final | 4–2 |
| 2023 | Pearl City, Hawaii | US Final | 3–2 |
| 2024 | San Diego, Southern California | Round 3 | 1–2 |
| 2025 | Wailuku, Hawaii | Runner-up | 3–1 |
| 2026 | Livermore, Northern California | Runner-up | 3–1 |

=== Results by state ===
As of the 2026 Intermediate League World Series.

| State | Region Championships | ILWS Championships | W–L | PCT |
|---|---|---|---|---|
| Hawaii | 6 | 1 | 19–9 | .679 |
| Southern California | 2 | 0 | 3–4 | .429 |
| Northern California | 2 | 0 | 3–4 | .429 |
| (Arizona) Host Team(s) | 1 | 1 | 4–0 | 1.000 |
| Arizona | 1 | 0 | 1–2 | .333 |
| Total | 12 | 2 | 30–19 | .612 |

== See also ==
West Region in other Little League divisions

- Little League – West 1957-2000
  - Little League – Northwest
  - Little League – West
- Junior League
- Senior League
- Big League
