= 2019 Intermediate League World Series =

Tournament information
- Location: Livermore, California
- Dates: July 28–August 4

Final positions
- Champions: McCalla, Alabama
- Runner-up: Matamoros, Mexico

The 2019 Intermediate League World Series took place from July 28–August 4 in Livermore, California. McCalla, Alabama defeated Matamoros, Mexico in the championship game. This was the last Intermediate Little League World Series prior to the COVID-19 pandemic.

== Teams ==
United States	International
(California) Livermore, California; District 57 (Livermore/Granada); Host	(South Korea) Seoul, South Korea; West Seoul; Asia–Pacific
(Indiana) Georgetown, Indiana; Highlander Youth Recreation; Central	(Western Australia) Perth, Western Australia; Perth Metro North; Australia
(New Jersey) Nutley, New Jersey; Nutley (Am/East); East	(Alberta) Lethbridge, Alberta; Lethbridge; Canada
(Alabama) McCalla, Alabama; McCalla; Southeast	Brno, Czech Republic; South Czech Republic; Europe–Africa
(New Mexico) Roswell, New Mexico; Noon Optimist; Southwest	(Puerto Rico) Guayama, Puerto Rico; Radames Lopez; Latin America
(California) Petaluma, Northern California; Petaluma American; West	(Tamaulipas) Matamoros, Tamaulipas; Matamoros; Mexico

== Results ==
United States Bracket

Upper round 1
—	California	3
—	Indiana	9
—	New Jersey	2
—	Alabama	11
Lower round 1
0–1	California	9
0–1	New Mexico	10
0–1	New Jersey	8
0–1	(California) Host (F/8)	10

Upper round 2
—	(California) Host	1
1–0	Indiana	2
—	New Mexico	8
1–0	Alabama	20
Lower round 2
1–1	New Mexico	7
1–1	(California) Host	5

Upper final
2–0	Indiana	4
2–0	Alabama	5
Lower final
2–1	Indiana	6
2–1	New Mexico	11

United States Championship
3–0	Alabama (F/6)	11
3–1	New Mexico	1

International Bracket

Upper round 1
—	South Korea	14
—	Mexico	6
—	Canada	2
—	Puerto Rico (F/5)	14
Lower round 1
0–1	Mexico (F/5)	19
0–1	Australia	3
0–1	Canada (F/8)	6
0–1	Czech Republic	4

Upper round 2
—	Czech Republic	0
1–0	South Korea (F/4)	15
—	Australia	2
1–0	Puerto Rico (F/5)	17
Lower round 2
1–1	Mexico	9
1–1	Canada	0

Upper final
2–0	South Korea	4
2–0	Puerto Rico	3
Lower final
2–1	Puerto Rico	5
2–1	Mexico	9

International Championship
3–0	South Korea	4
3–1	Mexico	8

Consolation round

—
0–2	California	1
0–2	Czech Republic (F/5)	11

—
0–2	New Jersey	15
0–2	Australia	6

Elimination Round

Semifinals
3–0	Alabama (F/6)	11
3–1	New Mexico	1
3–0	South Korea	4
3–1	Mexico	8

World Championship
4–0	Alabama	9
4–1	Mexico	5

2019 Intermediate League World Series Champions
McCalla LL
McCalla, Alabama
