= Intermediate League World Series (Europe–Africa Region) =

Europe–Africa Region
- Most recent season or competition: 2026 Intermediate League World Series
- Sport: Baseball
- Founded: 2014
- Most recent champion: Brno, Czech Republic
- Most titles: Czech Republic (8)

The Intermediate League World Series Europe–Africa Region is one of six International regions that currently sends teams to the World Series in Livermore, California. The region's participation in the ILWS dates back to 2014.

== Europe–Africa Region Countries ==
- Austria
- Belgium
- Croatia
- Czech Republic
- France
- Germany / USA
- Lithuania
- Netherlands
- United Kingdom

== Region Champions ==
As of the 2026 Intermediate League World Series.

Year	City	ILWS	Record
2014	Brno, Czech Republic	Round 2	0–3
2015	Brno, Czech Republic	Round 2	0–3
2016	Brno, Czech Republic	Round 1	0–3
2017	Paris, France	Round 1	0–3
2018	Brno, Czech Republic	Round 1	0–3
2019	Brno, Czech Republic	Round 2	1–2
2020	Cancelled due to COVID-19 pandemic		
2021	Cancelled due to COVID-19 pandemic		
2022	Haarlem, Netherlands	Round 1	2–2
2023	Prague, Czech Republic	Round 1	0–3
2024	Mannheim, Germany	Round 1	1–2
2025	Brno, Czech Republic	Round 1	0–3
2026	Brno, Czech Republic	Round 2	2–2

=== Results by Country ===
As of the 2026 Intermediate League World Series.

Country	Region Championships	ILWS Championships	W–L	PCT
Czech Republic	8	0	3–22	.120
Netherlands	1	0	2–2	.500
Germany	1	0	1–2	.333
France	1	0	0–3	.000
Total	11	0	6–29	.171

== See also ==
Europe–Africa Region in other Little League divisions

- Little League
- Junior League
- Senior League
- Big League
