= 2008 Little League Philippine Series =

The 2008 Little League Philippine Series was held from April 5 to 13, 2008. The venue of the tournament was the Alabang Country Club in Muntinlupa. 72 teams joined in the various age divisions. This is an annual event and winners earn the right to represent Little League Philippines at the Asia Pacific Regional Tournaments to be held in June and July.

== Little League Baseball (11 to 12 Years Old) ==
A new tournament format was used in 2008. The new format is similar to that used in the Mexican Little League tournament. A total of 29 teams joined.

=== First round Standings ===
Group A	Wins	Losses	
Tanauan, Batangas	5	0	Advances to 2nd Round
Ilocos Norte	4	1	Advances to 2nd Round
Los Baños, Laguna	2	3	
Camarines Sur	2	3	
Makati	2	3	
Bacolod East, Negros Occ.	0	5	

Group B	Wins	Losses	
Palayan, Nueva Ecija	5	0	Advances to 2nd Round
Agoncillo Pook, Batangas	4	1	Advances to 2nd Round
Zamboanga	3	2	
Agoncillo 1, Batangas	2	3	
Pasig	1	4	
Manila	0	5	

Group C	Wins	Losses	
Lipa, Batangas	5	0	Advances to 2nd Round
Marikina	4	1	Advances to 2nd Round
Antipolo	3	2	
Bataan	2	3	
General Trias	1	4	
Taguig	0	5	

Group D	Wins	Losses	
Muntinlupa	5	0	Advances to 2nd Round
Talisay, Negros Occ.	4	1	Advances to 2nd Round
North Samar	3	2	
Batangas City	2	3	
Santa Cruz, Laguna	1	4	
Bacolod West, Negros Occ.	0	5	

Group E	Wins	Losses	
ILLAM	4	0	Advances to 2nd Round
Bulacan	3	1	Advances to 2nd Round
Camarines Norte	2	2	
Cavite	1	3	
Caloocan	0	4	

=== Second round Standings ===
Group A	Wins	Losses	
Muntinlupa	4	0	Advance to Semi-final
Tanauan, Batangas	3	1	Advance to Semi-final
Marikina	2	2	
Palayan, Nueva Ecija	1	3	
Ilocos Norte	0	4	

Group B	Wins	Losses	
Bulacan	3	1	Advance to Semi-final
ILLAM	3	1	Advance to Semi-final
Talisay, Negros, Occ.	2	2	
Lipa City, Batangas	2	2	
Agoncillo Pook, Batangas	0	4	

=== Semi-finals ===
Muntinlupa 20 ILLAM 13

Tanauan, Batangas 13 Bulacan 2

=== Third Place ===
Bulacan 12 ILLAM 0

=== Championship ===
Tanauan, Batangas 8 Muntinlupa 2

== Junior League Baseball (13-14 Years Old) ==
	Wins	Losses	
ILLAM	6	0	Advance to Championship
Muntinlupa	5	1	Advance to Championship
Palayan	4	2	
Zamboanga	3	3	
Tanauan, Batangas	2	4	
Bacolod West	1	5	
Taguig	0	6	

=== Championship ===
ILLAM 16 Muntinlupa 5

== Senior League Baseball (14-16 Years Old) ==
	Wins	Losses	
ILLAM	8	0	Advance to Championship
Tanauan, Batangas	7	1	Advance to Championship
Muntinlupa	6	2	
Marikina	5	3	
Camarines Norte	4	4	
Batangas City	3	5	
Cavite	1	7	
North Samar	1	7	
Taguig	1	7	

=== Championship ===
ILLAM 14 Tanauan 2

== Big League Baseball (16-18 Years Old) ==
	Wins	Losses	
ILLAM	6	0	Advance to Championship
Makati	4	2	Advance to Championship
Palayan	4	2	
Tanauan	2	4	
Talisay	2	4	
Batangas City	2	4	
Bataan	1	5	

=== Championship ===
ILLAM 1 Makati 0

== Little League Softball (11-12 Years Old) ==
	Wins	Losses	
Bacolod West	5	0	Advance to Championship
Cavite	4	1	Advance to Championship
ILLAM	2	3	
Antipolo	2	3	
Makati	1	4	
Muntinlupa	1	4	

=== Championship ===
Bacolod West 7 Cavite 2

== Junior League Softball (13-14 Years Old) ==
	Wins	Losses	
Bacolod West	7	1	Advance to Championship
ILLAM	7	1	Advance to Championship
Bacolod East	3	5	
Cavite	2	6	
Muntinlupa	1	7	

=== Championship ===
Bacolod West 5 ILLAM 3

== Senior League Softball (13-16 Years Old) ==
	Wins	Losses	
Bacolod West	7	0	Advance to Championship
Muntinlupa	6	1	Advance to Championship
Santa Cruz, Laguna	5	2	
Caloocan	4	3	
Palayan, Nueva Ecija	3	4	
Cavite	2	5	
Pasig	1	6	
Makati	0	7	

=== Championship ===
Bacolod West 8 Muntinlupa 0

== Big League Softball (14-18 Years Old) ==
	Wins	Losses	
Manila	4	2	Advance to Championship
ILLAM	4	2	Advance to Championship
Bacolod East	4	2	
Muntinlupa	0	6	

=== Championship ===
Manila 9 ILLAM 1

== See also ==
- 2009 Little League Philippine Series
