= Intermediate League World Series (Australia Region) =

Australia Region
- Most recent season or competition: 2026 Intermediate League World Series
- Sport: Baseball
- Founded: 2018
- Most recent champion: Adelaide, South Australia
- Most titles: Western Australia (3)

The Intermediate League World Series Australia Region is one of six International regions that currently sends teams to the World Series in Livermore, California. The region's participation in the ILWS dates back to 2018.

== Australia Region States ==
- Australian Capital Territory
- New South Wales
- Queensland
- South Australia
- Victoria
- Western Australia

== Region Champions ==
As of the 2026 Intermediate League World Series.

Year	City	ILWS	Record
2018	Perth, Western Australia	Round 1	0–3
2019	Perth, Western Australia	Round 1	0–3
2020	Cancelled due to COVID-19 pandemic		
2021	Cancelled due to COVID-19 pandemic		
2022	Madeley, Western Australia	Round 1	0–3
2023	Brisbane, Queensland	Round 1	1–3
2024	Sydney, New South Wales	Round 2	1–2
2025	Sydney, New South Wales	Round 2	1–2
2026	Adelaide, South Australia	Round 1	0–3

=== Results by State ===
As of the 2026 Intermediate League World Series.

Country	Region Championships	ILWS Championships	W–L	PCT
Western Australia	3	0	0–9	.000
New South Wales	2	0	2–4	.333
Queensland	1	0	1–3	.250
South Australia	1	0	0–3	.000
Total	7	0	3–19	.136

== See also ==
Australia Region in other Little League divisions

- Little League
- Junior League
- Senior League
