= Intermediate League World Series (Host Team) =

The Intermediate League World Series Host team is one of six United States berths currently allotted at the World Series in Livermore, California. The champion of California's District 57 receives the bid.

== Host teams at the Intermediate League World Series ==
As of the 2026 Intermediate League World Series.

Year	City	ILWS	Record
2013	Pleasanton National (Pleasanton, California)	Round 3	2–2
2014	Canyon Creek (San Ramon, California)	Round 1	1–2
2015	Danville, California	Round 2	1–2
2016	Danville / Tassajara Valley (Danville, California)	Round 3	2–2
2017	Danville / Tassajara Valley (Danville, California)	Round 3	2–2
2018	Livermore / Granada (Livermore, California)	Runner-up	4–2
2019	Livermore / Granada (Livermore, California)	Round 2	1–2
2020	Cancelled due to COVID-19 pandemic		
2021	Cancelled due to COVID-19 pandemic		
2022	Danville, California	Champions	4–0
2023	Bollinger Canyon (San Ramon, California)	Round 1	1–2
2024	Livermore, California	US Final	3–2
2025	Danville, California	Round 1	2–2
2026	Bollinger Canyon (San Ramon, California)	US Final	4–2

=== Results by Host ===
As of the 2026 Intermediate League World Series.

Host	ILWS Hosted	ILWS Championships	W–L	PCT
California–District 57 Champion	12	1	27–22	.551
Total	12	1	27–22	.551

== See also ==
Host teams in other Little League divisions

- Junior League
- Senior League
- Big League
