= Little League Baseball =

American youth sports organization

Little League Baseball, Incorporated
- Current season, competition or edition: 2026 Little League World Series
- Sport: Baseball, softball
- Founded: 1939 in Williamsport, Pennsylvania, U.S.
- Founder: Carl E. Stotz
- First season: 1939
- CEO: Patrick Wilson
- Claim to fame: Largest organized youth sports organization in the world
- Motto: Character, Courage, and Loyalty
- No. of teams: over 180,000
- Competitors: 2,600,000
- Qualification: Little League International Tournament
- Broadcasters: ESPN, ESPN2, ABC; Madison Square Garden Network (MSG), New England Sports Network (NESN)
- Website: www.littleleague.org

Little League Baseball and Softball (officially, Little League Baseball Inc) is a 501(c)(3) nonprofit organization based in South Williamsport, Pennsylvania, United States, which organizes local youth baseball and softball leagues throughout the United States and the rest of the world.

It was founded in 1939 by Carl Edwin Stotz as a three-team league in the adjacent larger town of Williamsport, Pennsylvania. The ensuing Little League organization was incorporated on October 10, 1950, with Stotz serving as the organization's first commissioner for 18 years until 1955. Little League Baseball encourages local volunteers to organize and operate Little League franchise programs that are annually chartered through Little League International. Each local league can structure itself to best serve the children in the area in which the league operates. Several specific divisions of Little League baseball and softball are available to children and adolescents ages 4 to 16. The organization holds a congressional charter authorized by the United States Congress under Title 36 of the United States Code.

The organization's administrative office is located in South Williamsport of Lycoming County, Pennsylvania. The first Little League Baseball World Series was played in Williamsport in 1947. The Little League International Complex in South Williamsport hosts the annual tournament of the Little League Baseball World Series at Howard J. Lamade Stadium and adjacent Little League Volunteer Stadium, and is also the site of the Peter J. McGovern Little League Museum, which provides a history of Little League Baseball and Softball through interactive exhibits for children. Many Major League Baseball (MLB) players past and present in the National League and American League have started out playing in their local community / neighborhood Little Leagues.

== History ==
Logo of Little League baseball from 1954 to 2020

Carl Edwin Stotz (1910–1992), a longtime resident of Williamsport, Pennsylvania, founded Little League Baseball in 1939. He began experimenting with his idea in the summer of 1938 when he gathered his nephews, Jimmy and Major Gehron, and their neighborhood friends. They tried different field dimensions over the course of the summer and played several informal games. The following summer, they felt that they were ready to establish what later became Little League Baseball. The first small league organized in Williamsport had just three teams, each sponsored by a different business. The first teams, Jumbo Pretzel, Lycoming Dairy, and Lundy Lumber Company were managed by Stotz and his friends, George and Bert Bebble. The men, joined by their wives and another couple, formed the first Little League board of directors.

The first league game took place on June 6, 1939, when Lundy Lumber defeated Lycoming Dairy, 23–8. Lycoming Dairy became the champions of the first half of the season and then defeated Lundy Lumber, the second-half champions, in a best-of-three championship series. The following year, a second league was formed in Williamsport, and Little League Baseball grew to become an international organization with nearly 200,000 teams in every U.S. state and more than 80 countries.

Kathryn "Tubby" Johnston Massar was the first woman to play in a Little League baseball game, in 1950. However, when that season ended, a Little League meeting was held, and it was decided that girls would be banned from Little League baseball. From 1951 through 1973, Little League baseball was restricted to boys only. In 1974, due to a lawsuit brought on behalf of Maria Pepe by the National Organization for Women, the New Jersey Superior Court decided that Little League baseball must allow girls to play. In the final week of December 1974, President Gerald Ford, signed a bill that opened Little League baseball to girls.

According to the Little League Baseball and Softball participation statistics following the 2008 season, there were nearly 2.6 million boys and girls in Little League Baseball worldwide. Of these, approximately 400,000 are registered in softball leagues (including both boys and girls). Starting in 2022, for tournament purposes, Little League Baseball was divided into 20 geographic regions: ten national and ten international. Each summer, Little League operates seven World Series tournaments in various locations throughout the U.S. (Little League softball and Junior, Senior, and Big League baseball and softball).

=== Timeline ===
==== Early years ====
1939: Little League is established by Carl E. Stotz, George Bebble, and Bert Bebble. The first season is played in a lot close to Bowman Field. Lycoming Dairy is the first season champion.

1946: Little League expands to 12 leagues, all in Pennsylvania.

1947: The first league outside of Pennsylvania is founded in Hammonton, New Jersey. Maynard League of Williamsport defeats a team from Lock Haven, Pennsylvania to win the first Little League World Series. Allen Yearick is the first Little League graduate to play professional baseball when he is signed by the Boston Braves.

1948: Little League has grown to include 94 leagues. Lock Haven returns to the Little League World Series and defeats a team from St. Petersburg, Florida. The first corporate sponsor, U.S. Rubber, donates Pro-Keds shoes to teams at the series.

1949: After a decade, Little League is featured in the nationally famous weekly longtime magazine, the Saturday Evening Post and on newsreels shown in neighborhood movie. Commissioner Stotz receives hundreds of requests for information on forming local leagues from all over the country. Little League incorporates in the State of New York.

1950 Kay Johnston becomes the first girl to play Little League baseball. She cuts her hair, dresses as a boy and adopts the nickname "Tubby" to join the Kings Dairy Little League team in Corning, New York as a boy. After earning her way onto the team and being assigned first base, she tells her coach that she is a girl, but he keeps her on the team. She is forced to quit after just one season because a new rule, known as the Tubby Rule, is created to bar girls from participation. The rule remains in force until 1974.

1951: Leagues are formed in the western province on the Pacific Ocean coast of British Columbia, in the neighboring Dominion of Canada to the north and in the old U.S. territory of the Panama Canal Zone surrounding the Panama Canal, in Central America, making them the first youth baseball leagues outside the United States.

1953: The Little League World Series is televised for the first time. Jim McKay provided the play-by-play for the Columbia Broadcasting System (CBS), and Howard Cosell, does so for the American Broadcasting Company and ABC News Radio. Joey Jay, of Middletown, Connecticut, and the Milwaukee Braves is the first Little League graduate to play in Major League Baseball. In 1953, Robert Francis Morrison filed an official charter with Little League Baseball to admit the Cannon Street Y.M.C.A. as its first all-black team. The league consisted of four teams, sponsored by prominent black businesses in Charleston, South Carolina. In 1955, in the beginnings of the growing nation-wide Civil rights movement, when, Morrison entered his Cannon Street All-Stars into the city tournament, white leagues reacted by drafting a resolution requesting a whites-only tournament. All 55 white teams eventually withdrew from the city and state tournament. The Cannon Street All-Stars became the 1955 South Carolina state champions by forfeit. However, they were informed by then national Little League Baseball president Peter J. McGovern that they would not be permitted to represent the state at the regional championships in Williamsport. Little League executives invited the Cannon Street All-Stars as guests to attend the tournament in which they were barred from playing.

1954: Boog Powell, outfielder/first baseman later of the Baltimore Orioles and two other MLB teams, plays in the Little League World Series for Lakeland, Florida, and Ken Hubbs, later of the Chicago Cubs, plays for Colton, California. Little League had expanded to more than 3,300 leagues. Jim Barberi, later of the MLB National League pennant winner of the 1966 Los Angeles Dodgers, is a member a decade earlier of the Schenectady, New York, team that wins the 1954 L.L.B. World Series tournament championship.

1955: There is a Little League organization now in each of the 48 continental U.S. states. Young George W. Bush, (son of George H. W. Bush), begins playing Little League as a catcher for the Cubs of the Central Little League in Midland, Texas. He is the first Little League graduate to be elected President of the United States. After white teams in South Carolina refuse to play against the all-black Cannon Street YMCA All-Stars of Charleston, Little League issues an ultimatum that the team must be permitted to play, but many organizations in the Southern United States suspend and turn in their league charters and form their own league in response. No team from South Carolina would reach the World Series tournament until 2015.

1956: Stotz severs his ties with Little League Baseball, Inc. after 18 years in a dispute over the direction, policies and control of the league. Stotz believed that the league was becoming overly commercialized by then-president Peter J. McGovern. Stotz remains active in youth baseball with the "Original League" in Williamsport for the next 38 years until his death in June 1992. Little League records its first on-field death in Garland, Texas, when 12-year-old Richard Oden is hit in the head by a pitch, and the park where the incident occurred is renamed Rick Oden Field. With batting helmets yet to be developed, Garland League teams finish the season wearing youth football helmets over their baseball caps when batting. Later in the year, pitcher Fred Shapiro throws a perfect game in the Little League World Series.

==== International era ====
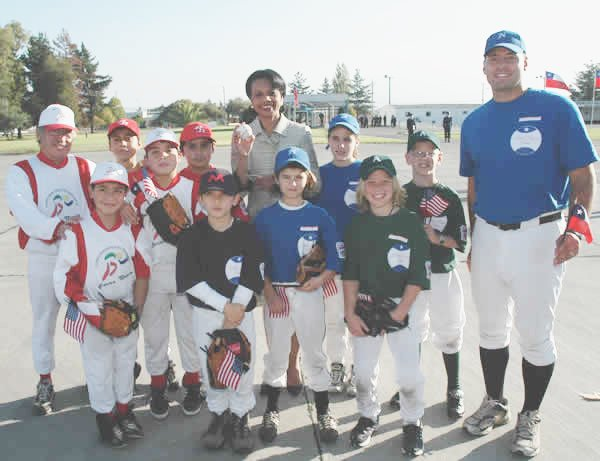
U.S. Secretary of State Condoleezza Rice poses with Little Leaguers from Chile in Santiago

1957: Angel Macias throws a perfect game and Monterrey, Mexico, becomes the first team from outside the United States to win the Little League World Series. (Portrayed in the 2010 film The Perfect Game.)

1959: The Little League World Series moves from Williamsport to the newly built Little League headquarters in South Williamsport. The protective baseball helmet is developed by Dr. Creighton J. Hale.

1960: A team from West Berlin, West Germany, is the first from Europe to play in the Little League World Series. The series is broadcast live for the first time on ABC. Little League has grown to 27,400 teams in more than 5,500 leagues.

1961: Brian Sipe, future quarterback for the NFL's Cleveland Browns, plays for the series champions from El Cajon, California.

1962: Jackie Robinson attends the Little League World Series. President John F. Kennedy proclaims National Little League Week.

1967: A team from West Tokyo, Japan, is the first team from Asia to win the Little League World Series.

1969: Taiwan begins a dominant era that would see them win 17 Little League World Series titles.

1971: The aluminum baseball bat, partly developed by Little League Baseball, is first used. Lloyd McClendon of Gary, Indiana, dominates the Little League World Series, hitting five home runs in five at-bats. He would later play in the major leagues and become the first Little League graduate to manage an MLB club (the Pittsburgh Pirates).

1973: Ed Vosberg plays in the Little League World Series for Tucson, Arizona. He would later play in the College World Series for the University of Arizona in 1980 and the World Series in 1997 for the Florida Marlins. Vosberg is the first person to have played in all three world series.

1974: Girls are formally permitted to play in Little League as result of a lawsuit brought on behalf of Frances Pescatore and Jenny Fulle, and a Little League Softball program for both boys and girls is created. Bunny Taylor becomes the first girl to pitch a no-hitter.

1975: In a controversial decision, all foreign teams are banned from the Little League World Series. International play is restored the following year.

1980: A team from Tampa, Florida, representing Belmont Heights Little League, is led by two future major-leaguers, Derek Bell and Gary Sheffield. Bell returns the following year and Belmont Heights again loses in the finals to a team from Taiwan.

1982: The Peter J. McGovern Little League Museum opens. Cody Webster leads a team from Kirkland, Washington in an upset victory over a powerful team from Taiwan, the nation's first loss in 31 games. This game is later featured on ESPN's 30 for 30 series Little Big Men.

1984: A team from Seoul, South Korea, wins their nation's first title when they defeat a team from Altamonte Springs, Florida, led by future Boston Red Sox catcher Jason Varitek.

1984: Victoria Roche, a 12-year-old from Belgium, becomes the first girl to play in the Little League World Series.

1988: Tom Seaver is the first former Little Leaguer to be enshrined in the Peter J. McGovern Museum Hall of Excellence.

1989: Poland becomes the first former Warsaw Pact nation to receive a Little League charter. Trumbull, Connecticut, led by future NHL star Chris Drury, wins the Little League World Series.

1991: Future MLB all-star Jason Marquis pitches the Staten Island South Shore Little League team to third place in the Little League World Series over Canada, throwing a no-hitter.

1992: Stotz, the founder of Little League, dies. Lights are installed at Lamade Stadium, allowing the first night games to be played. The series is expanded from single-elimination to round-robin format. Long Beach, California, managed by former major-leaguer Jeff Burroughs and starring his son, future major-leaguer Sean Burroughs, is named series champion after Zamboanga City, Philippines is forced to forfeit for using ineligible players.

1993: Long Beach repeats as champions, defeating Coquivacoa Little League of Maracaibo, Venezuela. It is the first U.S. team to successfully defend its title.

1997: ESPN2 broadcasts regional play for the first time. Taiwan's baseball association withdraws from Little League Baseball (it would rejoin in 2003) over newly established rules on zoning. Bradenton, Florida, and Pottsville, Pennsylvania play at Lamade Stadium before the largest crowd ever to attend a non-championship game, estimated at over 35,000 fans.

1999: Burkina Faso becomes the 100th nation with a Little League organization. Hirkata Little League of Osaka, Japan becomes the first Japanese team to win a title since 1976.

2000: An expansion project begins at Little League International and Volunteer Stadium is built. This allows the pool of participants to double from 8 to 16 the following year.

2001: The Little League World Series expands from 8 to 16 teams, with the following changes to regional lineups (post-2000 regions in bold):

- US regions:
  - The East Region splits into the **New England** and **Mid-Atlantic** Regions.
  - The Central Region splits into the **Great Lakes** and **Midwest** Regions.
  - The South Region splits into the **Southeast** and **Southwest** Regions.
  - The **West** Region spins off the **Northwest** Region.
- International regions:
  - **Canada** remains intact as a region.
  - The **Latin America** Region spins off new regions for the **Caribbean** and **Mexico**.
  - The Far East Region splits into the **Asia** and **Pacific** Regions.
  - The **Europe** Region spins off the **TransAtlantic** Region.
    - These two regions were geographically identical, differing in the required composition of playing rosters. Transatlantic teams were required to consist of a majority of players who were nationals of the US, Canada, or Japan. Europe teams could have no more than three nationals of those countries.

Volunteer Stadium opens. George W. Bush becomes the first U.S. president to visit the Little League World Series. Led by Danny Almonte, who pitched the first perfect game since 1957, the Rolando Paulino All Stars (Bronx, New York) finish third in the series. However, the team's entire postseason is wiped from the books when it is found that Almonte is 14 years old.

2002: Austin Dillon plays for Southwest Forsyth (County) Little League in Clemmons, North Carolina. The grandson of Richard Childress, he would win NASCAR championships in the Truck Series in 2011 and Nationwide Series in 2013, and made his Cup Series debut in 2014.

2004: Effective with the 2004 LLWS, the Europe Region is renamed EMEA (Europe, Middle East and Africa).

2007: Little League expands into Australia for the first time. Effective with the 2007 LLWS, the Asia and Pacific regions are merged to form the Asia-Pacific Region, with Japan split into its own region.

2007: Little League expands into Kyrgyzstan for the first time.

2008: Effective with this year's LLWS, the Transatlantic and EMEA regions are reorganized into the Europe and Middle East and Africa (MEA) regions. The previous nationality restrictions for players from these regions are abolished. Hawaii wins the 2008 Little League World Series, defeating Mexico in the final game.

2008: Little League International relocates the Southeast Region headquarters from Gulfport, Florida, to Warner Robins, Georgia. Little League International completes renovation of its administration building in South Williamsport.

2010: The World Series tournament is reorganized, eliminating pool play and adopting double-elimination until the bracket winners are determined. Little League announces plans to add a pilot division in baseball for ages 12–13 to help baseball Little Leaguers make the transition to regulation-size fields in Junior League Baseball. Bartlett, Illinois, becomes the largest league.

2011: The World Series officially eliminates the two four-team brackets and puts all eight teams in the United States bracket and all eight teams in the International bracket, with a SEC baseball tournament-style flipped bracket on the loser's bracket in order to prevent rematches, but does not require the loser to defeat the winner's bracket team twice in either Saturday championship game from which the winner advances to the Sunday final.

2012: The Middle East and Africa Region produces the first team from the African continent in the Little League World Series, one from Lugazi Little League of Uganda.

On August 29, Little League announces a major reorganization of the international brackets, effective with the 2013 LLWS:

- **Australia** is spun off from the Asia–Pacific Region and will receive its own berth in the LLWS. This reflects Australia's rise to become the fourth-largest country, and largest outside North America, in Little League participation.
- The Middle East and Africa Region is disbanded.
- Middle Eastern countries, except for Israel and Turkey (which had been in the Europe Region – see below), are placed in the **Asia–Pacific Region**.
- African countries are to be placed in the former Europe Region, which is renamed the **Europe and Africa Region**. Israel and Turkey, members of the European zone of the International Baseball Federation, remain in the renamed region.

The Intermediate (50/70) Division, which had operated on a pilot basis since the 2011 season, is announced as an official Little League division, the first new division since 1999. The division, which launches fully in the 2013 season, has the same age limits as standard Little League but extends the pitching rubber to 50 feet from home plate and features bases 70 feet apart. The field is also larger than in standard Little League, and the rules are closer to those of standard baseball.

2013: Davie Jane Gilmour becomes the first woman to lead the Little League board of directors.

The first Intermediate Little League World Series is held in Livermore, California.

2014: On August 15, 2014, Mo'ne Davis of the Taney Dragons becomes the first girl in Little League World Series history to earn a win as a pitcher and to pitch a shutout. Davis also becomes the first Little Leaguer to appear on the cover of Sports Illustrated (issue date: August 25, 2014). ESPN's coverage of the August 20 semifinal game, featuring Davis, brings a 3.4 overnight rating, which is an all-time high for Little League on the network.

Jackie Robinson West becomes the first all-African-American Little League team to win the U.S. championship, but its title is later stripped after violations of the 1997 region regulations are discovered.

2018: Little League changes its age rules, moving the birthday deadline from May 1 back to August 31. This allowed 13-year-olds to play Majors level this year against 11-year-olds, but 11-year-olds born between May and August were unable to play the following year.

2020: The LLWS is canceled due to the COVID-19 pandemic.

2021: The LLWS is contested with a 16-team field of U.S.-only teams, another effect of the COVID-19 pandemic.

2022: The LLWS is held without COVID-related restrictions for the first time since 2019. The tournament size increases from 16 to 20 teams, with the addition of two new regions within the U.S. and two additional direct qualifiers among international teams.

2025: The Tung-Yuan Little League gives Chinese Taipei the island's first LLWS championship since 1996 with a 7–0 victory over the Summerlin South Little League from Las Vegas, Nevada in the final.

== Regions ==
Map of Little League regions (as of 2023)

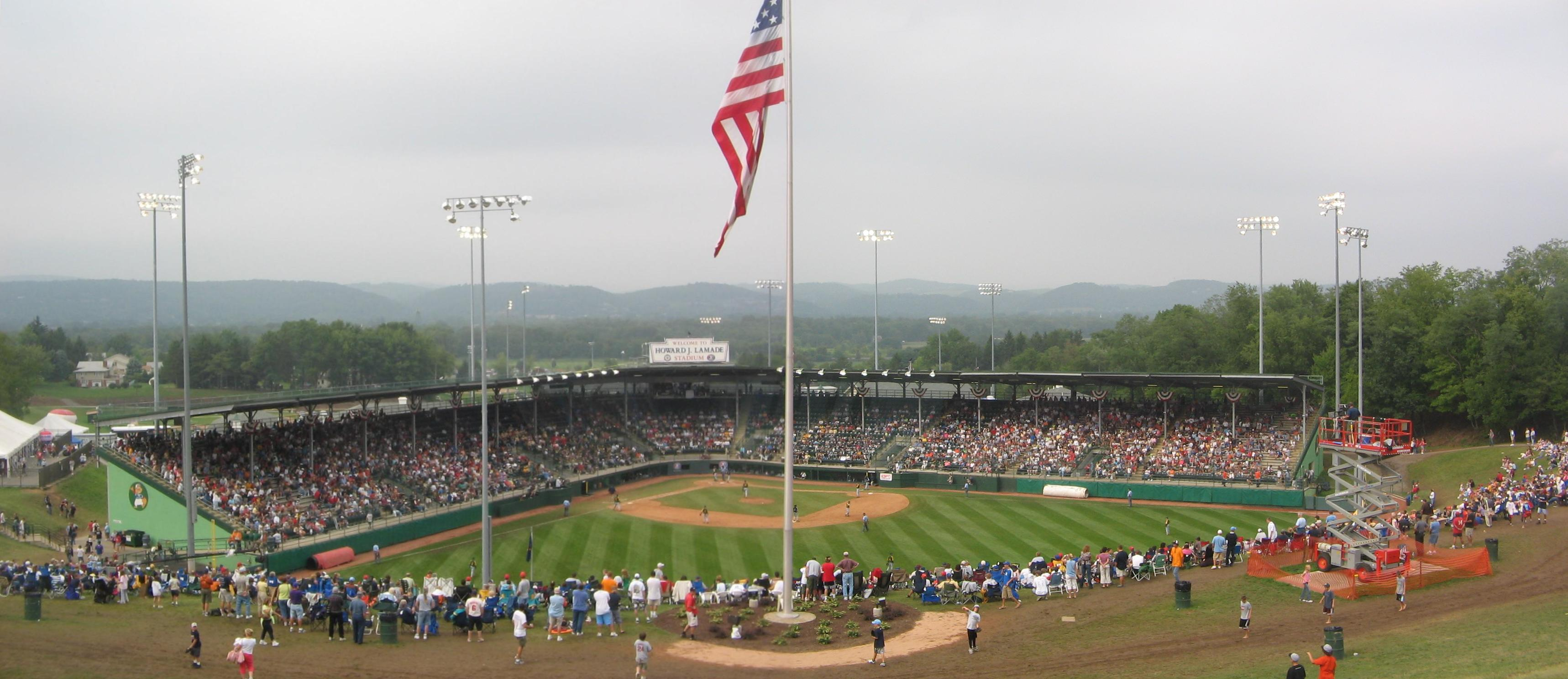
A Little League World Series game in Howard J. Lamade Stadium in South Williamsport.

Effective with the 2022 tournament, U.S. regions represented in the annual Little League Baseball World Series are:

- Great Lakes
- Metro
- Mid-Atlantic
- Midwest
- Mountain
- New England
- Northwest (including Alaska)
- Southeast
- Southwest
- West (including Hawaii)

Also effective in 2022, the international regions are:

- Canada
- Mexico
- Asia-Pacific and Middle East
- Japan
- Europe and Africa
- Australia
- Latin America
- Caribbean
- Cuba, Panama, and Puerto Rico — on a rotating basis, two of these three teams directly qualify for the LLWS, with the other team qualifying through its normal region

== Little League World Series ==
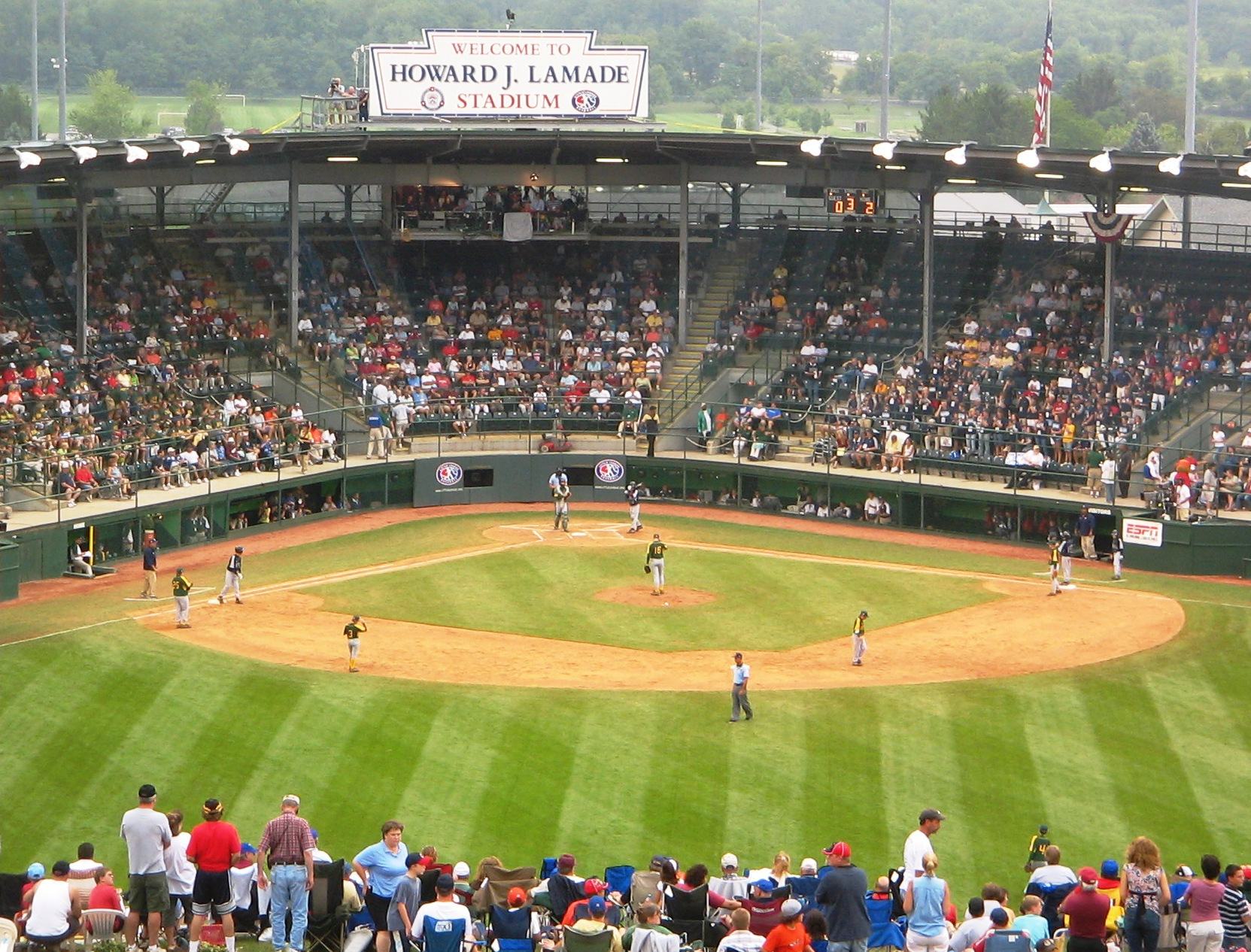
A game of the 2007 Little League World Series

The best-known event on the Little League Baseball and Softball calendar is the annual Little League Baseball World Series, which is held every August in South Williamsport, Pennsylvania. Local and regional tournaments leading up to the World Series are held in the U.S. insular areas of Puerto Rico, the U.S. Virgin Islands, and the Northern Mariana Islands, and throughout the world. In 2003, for example, there were tournaments in Canada, Latin America (Mexico, Aruba, Curaçao, Panama, Peru, and Venezuela), Europe (Germany and Poland), and Asia (Japan, Philippines, South Korea, Taiwan).

=== Little, Junior, Senior, and Big League baseball & softball World Series ===
The Little League Baseball World Series is one of nine World Series conducted by Little League International every year, each one held in a different location:

- Little League World Series (baseball)
- Intermediate Little League World Series (baseball)
- Junior League World Series (baseball)
- Senior League World Series (baseball)
- Big League World Series (baseball) (discontinued after 2016)
- Girls Little League Softball World Series (or the Major Division)
- Girls Junior League Softball World Series
- Girls Senior League Softball World Series
- Girls Big League Softball World Series (discontinued after 2016)
- Boys Little League Softball World Series
- Boys Senior League Softball World Series
- Boys Big League Softball World Series (discontinued after 2016)

== Awards ==
Awards include:

- Good Sport of the Year Award
- Challenger Award
- ASAP (A Safety Awareness Program) Award
- Bill Shea Distinguished Little League Graduate Award
- Mom of the Year Award
- George and Barbara Bush Little League Parents of the Year Award
- Volunteer of the Year Award
- Howard and Gail Paster Little League Urban Initiative Volunteer of the Year Award
- Howard Hartman Little League Friendship Award

== Baseball divisions ==
Little League Baseball has several baseball divisions based on age.

=== Summary chart of major divisions in Little League Baseball ===
The major divisions of Little League Baseball have their own World Series format as follows:

Division	Location	First held	Age of players	Series
Little League Baseball	South Williamsport, Pennsylvania	1947	9–12 years old	Little League World Series
Intermediate League Baseball	Livermore, California	2013	11–13 years old	Intermediate League World Series
Junior League Baseball	Taylor, Michigan	1981	13–14 years old	Junior League World Series
Senior League Baseball	Easley, South Carolina	1961	14–16 years old	Senior League World Series
Big League Baseball	Easley, South Carolina	1968	16–18 years old	Big League World Series (discontinued after 2016)

=== Tee-ball ===
Tee-ball is for boys and girls ages 4–7. In tee-ball, players hit the ball off of a tee located atop home plate; live pitching is not allowed. The purpose of the division is to teach young children the fundamentals of hitting and fielding.

=== Minor league ===
The minor league baseball division is generally for children ages 5–11, with local leagues given the option to allow 6-year-old children to try out. Local leagues are permitted to further divide the Minor League division based on player age and/or experience, and often consist of coach-pitch (i.e., the batter's coach lightly pitching the ball) or machine-pitch at lower levels, with defensive players pitching at higher levels.

=== 9–10-year-old division ===
The 9–10-year-old baseball division is a tournament program, established in 1994. It has competitions up to the state level, and the size of the diamond is the same as in the Little League division (with 60-foot (18 m) sides and a 46-foot (14 m) pitching distance).

=== Little League (or the Major Division) ===
The Little League Baseball division, also known as the Major Division, is for children aged 9 through 12, though local leagues have the option of barring 9 or 10 year olds from participating. The diamond has base paths measuring 60-foot (18 m) and a pitching distance of 46-foot (14 m). The local league can form an "All Stars" team consisting of players throughout the local teams, which can enter an international tournament culminating with the Little League World Series.

=== Little League Intermediate (50/70) Division ===
In 2012, Little League announced plans to add a new division of play for the 2013 season, the Little League Intermediate Division. This division is played on a field with a 50-foot (15 m) pitching distance and 70-foot (21 m) base paths. It is open to players ages 11–13, but may be limited to ages 11–12 or 12–13 by a local league. Players in this division are able to lead off and steal bases. The rules are similar to those of the Junior, Senior, and Big League divisions of play.

Little League holds a World Series in this level of play, officially called the Intermediate Little League World Series, in Livermore, California.

=== Junior, Senior, and Big Leagues ===
The Junior League, Senior League, and Big League Baseball divisions operate similarly for different age groups. All three use a conventionally-sized baseball diamond, with 90 feet (27 m) between bases and a 60 feet 6 inches (18.44 m) pitching distance. Similarly to the Major Division, local leagues can form "All Stars" teams from each age group and enter a tournament, again leading up to a "World Series", for each division. The Junior League consists of 12–14 year olds, the Senior League consists of 13–16 year olds, and the Big League was for 16–18 year olds. The Big League division was eliminated after the 2015–2016 season.

== Challenger program ==
Little League introduced the Challenger Division in 1989 to provide opportunities for children with physical and intellectual challenges to participate in the Little League program. The Challenger Division utilizes a "buddy system" in which Little Leaguers assist Challenger participants in the areas of batting, running and fielding. Challenger Division games are typically non-competitive in nature.

=== Little League Challenger Division ===
Introduced in 1989, the Little League Challenger Division is for participants ages 4–18. Games are played on a 46/60 field and are non-competitive.

=== Senior League Challenger Division ===
Approved at the 2014 Little League International Congress, the Senior League Challenger Division launched in 2015. This division is for participants ages 15 and above (no maximum age). Games are played on a 60/90 field and are non-competitive. Leagues may request permission to play games on a smaller field as well.

=== Participation ===
As of 2018, nearly 1,000 Little Leagues in 10 countries around the world offer the Challenger Program, providing an opportunity for more than 31,000 individuals with physical or intellectual challenges to participate in the Little League program.

== Softball divisions ==
Little League Baseball has several softball divisions for girls and boys, based on age.

Division	Location	First Held	Age of players	Series
Little League Softball	Greenville, North Carolina	1974	9–12 years old	Little League World Series (softball)
Junior League Softball	Kirkland, Washington	1999	12–14 years old	Junior League World Series (softball)
Senior League Softball	Sussex County, Delaware	1976	13–16 years old	Senior League World Series (softball)
Big League Softball	Kalamazoo, Michigan	1982	14–18 years old	Big League World Series (softball) (Division discontinued in 2016)

=== Boys softball ===
See footnote

- Tee Ball Softball for Boys
- Minor League Softball for Boys
- Little League Softball (or the Major Division) for Boys
- Senior League Softball for Boys
- Big League Softball for Boys

=== Girls softball ===
See footnotes

- Girls Tee Ball Softball
- Girls Minor League Softball
- Girls Little League Softball (or the Major Division)
- Girls Junior League Softball
- Girls Senior League Softball
- Girls Big League Softball

== Rules ==
Playing rules for the baseball divisions essentially follow the official baseball rules defined and used by Major League Baseball, especially with respect to the upper divisions (Junior, Senior). Some major exceptions are outlined in the following sections, and these apply to Little League (Minor and Major, ages 7–12) except as otherwise noted.

=== Rulebooks and fees ===
The official rules of Little League Baseball are available to the general public via a free app or as a $5 printed edition. In Canada, rulebook orders requested through LittleLeague.ca are routed to the US website at the same prices.

Rulebooks are not available in stores and must be ordered directly from Little League Baseball or from one of its regional centers. One paper copy is provided to each chartered team.

=== Length of game ===
A regulation game consists of six innings. If the game is halted prior to the completion of six innings, it is considered an official game if four innings have been completed (three and a half, if the home team leads); otherwise, if at least one inning has been completed, it is a suspended game.

In Intermediate Little League, as well as the Junior, Senior, and Big League levels (ages 13–18), a game consists of seven innings and is official if five innings have been completed.

=== Mandatory-play rule ===
In all divisions except Senior and Big League, every player on the team roster must have at least one plate appearance and play six consecutive outs on defense in each game. The penalty for a manager violating the rule is a two-game suspension. This rule is waived if the game is completed prior to the usual duration (six innings in Little League and below, seven innings in Intermediate Little League and Junior League). This rule is modified during tournament play, when teams having 13 or more players dressed are mandated to provide one plate appearance for each player, but have no defensive requirements. Teams having 12 or fewer players dressed are required to afford each player one plate appearance plus six consecutive outs in the field on defense.

=== Playing field ===
The size of the field is dependent on the division of play.

Tee-ball

The distance between the bases is generally 50 feet (15.24 m).

Minor League and Little League

The distance between the bases is 60 feet (18.29 m) and the distance from the pitcher's mound to home plate (more precisely, the midpoint of the front edge of the pitcher's rubber to the rear point of home plate) is 46 feet (14.02 m). Outfield fences must be at least 165 feet (50 m) from home plate, but are usually 200 feet (60 m) or more (the fields at the Williamsport complex have fences 225 feet away). The bases and pitching rubber are also slightly smaller than in standard baseball. Also, unlike fields at almost all levels of competitive baseball for teenagers and adults, the distance between home plate and the outfield fence is constant throughout fair territory.

Intermediate Little League

The distance between the bases is 70 feet (21.34 m) and the distance from the pitcher's mound to home plate is 50 feet (15.24 m). The recommended distance between home plate and the outfield fence ranges from 200 to 275 feet (60–85 m); unlike regular Little League, the distances can vary within fair territory. As in regular Little League, the bases and pitching rubber are also slightly smaller than in standard baseball.

Junior League, Senior League, and Big League

The distance between the bases is 90 feet (27.43 m), the same as for regulation Major League Baseball fields. The distance between the pitcher's mound and home plate is 60.5 feet (18.44 m), also identical to that of MLB. The minimum outfield distance in the upper divisions is 300 feet (91 m) (MLB's official, but not strictly enforced, minimum is 325 feet [99 m] at the foul lines), while the maximum for Big League is 425 feet (130 m). (Base paths of 80 feet [24.38 m] are optional for Junior League regular season play.)

=== Equipment ===
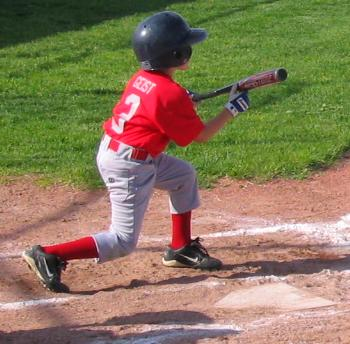
A Little Leaguer executing a bunt

Bats (all levels) may be made from wood or other materials (such as aluminum) and must be approved for use in Little League Baseball. For the Majors division and below, the maximum bat length is 33 inches (838 mm) and barrel diameter may not exceed 2 1/4 inches (57 mm). Since 2009, all Little League bats must be labeled with a Bat Performance Factor (BPF) of 1.15 or lower.

Bats for the Junior League level may have a maximum length of 34 inches (864 mm) and a maximum barrel diameter of 2 5/8 inches (67 mm). Bats for the Big and Senior League levels may have a maximum length of 36 inches (914 mm) and a maximum barrel diameter of 2 5/8 inches (67 mm). Non-wood Big and Senior League bats must meet the Batted Ball Coefficient of Restitution (BBCOR) testing standards that are currently used in the NCAA and NFHS (high school). Intermediate Little League bats must meet Junior League specifications.

=== Base running ===
When the pitcher is ready to pitch, a baserunner may not leave the base until the pitch reaches the batter in Minor League and standard Little League. In the upper levels, including Intermediate Little League, the runner may leave the base at any time while the ball is in play.

If a fielder is waiting at the base with the ball, an advancing runner must attempt to avoid contact. A runner may not slide head-first except when retreating to a previously held base.

In the upper levels, runners must still make an attempt to avoid contact if possible, and may not maliciously initiate contact with a fielder.

=== Batting ===
The upper limit of the strike zone extends to the batter's armpits.

In tee-ball, Minor League, and Little League (if the uncaught third strike rule is waived by the local league), the batter is out after the third strike regardless of whether the pitched ball is held by the catcher. In Little League (both standard and Intermediate), Junior, Senior, and Big League, a batter may attempt to advance to first base on a dropped third strike if first base is unoccupied with less than two outs, or if first base is unoccupied or occupied with two outs.

If the batter is hit by a pitch, the batter receives a base on balls automatically. However, if the batter does not make an attempt evade the pitched ball, the home-plate umpire may continue the at-bat.

=== Substitution ===
Players who have been substituted may return to the game under certain conditions, though a player who is removed as pitcher may not return to pitch.

=== Pitchers ===
Pitchers in all divisions are limited to a specific pitch count per game and a mandatory rest period between outings. These vary with age. The rest period also depends on the number of pitches thrown.

If the pitcher hits too many batters with the ball, or intentionally hits the batter, he or she is ejected from the pitching spot.

Intentional base on balls

Historically, a pitcher could intentionally walk a batter by simply announcing the intent to do so, without being required to throw any pitches. Beginning in 2008, the pitcher was required to actually pitch the required four balls (which are included in the pitcher's overall pitch count). In 2017, the Major and Minor levels of Little League Baseball aligned with an MLB rule and now allow the pitcher to intentionally walk a batter simply by declaration, though four pitches are added to the pitcher's overall pitch count. This change rescinded a former rule by which the batting team could decline the award of first base and force the pitcher to throw four balls, thereby increasing the pitcher's overall count.

=== Local options ===
Local leagues have a certain amount of flexibility. For example, a league may opt to use the "continuous batting order" rule (4.04), under which each player on the team's roster bats, even when not in the defensive lineup. Leagues may also waive the "ten-run rule" (4.10(e)), which ends the game if one team is ahead by ten or more runs after four innings.

== See also ==
- Baseball5
- List of Little League World Series champions by division
- List of Little League Softball World Series champions by division
- Amateur baseball in the United States
- Major League Baseball
- List of organized baseball leagues
- Baseball awards § World
- Baseball awards § U.S. youth baseball
- Baseball clothing and equipment
- Biddy basketball
