= 2022 Intermediate League World Series =

Tournament information
- Location: Livermore, California
- Dates: July 31–August 7

Final positions
- Champions: Danville, California
- Runner-up: Seoul, South Korea

The 2022 Intermediate League World Series took place from July 31–August 7 in Livermore, California. Danville, California defeated Seoul, South Korea in the championship game, which marked the first time the Host team won. This was the first Intermediate Little League World Series held since the COVID-19 pandemic.

== Teams ==
United States	International
(California) Danville, California; Danville; Host	(South Korea) Seoul, South Korea; West Seoul; Asia–Pacific
(Indiana) Georgetown, Indiana; Highlander Youth Recreation; Central	(Western Australia) Madeley, Western Australia; Wanneroo Giants; Australia
(New Jersey) Toms River, New Jersey; Toms River East; East	(Quebec) Mirabel, Quebec; Diamond Baseball; Canada
(Florida) Fort Lauderdale, Florida; Fort Lauderdale; Southeast	Haarlem, Netherlands; Kennemerland; Europe–Africa
(Texas) Needville, Texas; Needville; Southwest	(Curaçao) Willemstad, Curaçao; Pabao; Latin America
(Hawaii) Wailuku, Hawaii; Central East Maui; West	Caguas, Puerto Rico; Liga Criolla RA 12; Puerto Rico

== Results ==
United States Bracket

Upper round 1
—	New Jersey	10
—	Hawaii	11
—	Texas	6
—	Florida	4
Lower round 1
0–1	New Jersey	11
1–1	Texas	10
0–1	Florida	0
1–1	Hawaii (F/6)	10

Upper round 2
–	(California) Host (F/5)	13
1–0	Hawaii	0
–	Indiana	2
1–0	Texas	1
Lower round 2
1–1	New Jersey	1
2–1	Hawaii (F/6)	11

Upper final
1–0	(California) Host	8
1–0	Indiana	2
Lower final
1–1	Indiana	4
3–1	Hawaii	7

United States Championship
2–0	(California) Host	5
4–1	Hawaii	0

International Bracket

Upper round 1
—	Canada	0
—	South Korea (F/4)	15
—	Netherlands	9
—	Australia	7
Lower round 1
0–1	Canada	10
1–1	Netherlands	5
0–1	Australia	0
0–1	Curaçao (F/5)	13

Upper round 2
–	Curaçao	0
1–0	South Korea	7
–	Puerto Rico (F/5)	20
1–0	Netherlands	10
Lower round 2
1–1	Canada (F/9)	7
1–1	Curaçao	6

Upper final
2–0	South Korea	5
1–0	Puerto Rico	3
Lower final
1–1	Puerto Rico	9
2–1	Canada	7

International Championship
3–0	South Korea	12
2–1	Puerto Rico	4

Consolation round

—
1–2	Texas	7
0–2	Australia	1

—
0–2	Florida	8
1–2	Netherlands	9

Elimination Round

Semifinals
2–0	(California) Host	5
4–1	Hawaii	0
3–0	South Korea	12
2–1	Puerto Rico	4

World Championship
3–0	(California) Host	5
4–0	South Korea	2

2022 Intermediate League World Series Champions
Danville LL
Danville, California
