= 2024 Intermediate League World Series =

Tournament information
- Location: Livermore, California
- Dates: July 28–August 4

Final positions
- Champions: Kenner, Louisiana
- Runner-up: Seoul, South Korea

The 2024 Intermediate League World Series took place from July 28–August 4 in Livermore, California. Kenner, Louisiana defeated Seoul, South Korea in the championship game.

== Teams ==
United States	International
(California) Livermore, California; Livermore LL; Host	(South Korea) Seoul, South Korea; West Seoul LL; Asia–Pacific
(Indiana) Georgetown, Indiana; Highlander Youth Recreation LL; Central	(New South Wales) Sydney, Australia; Hills LL; Australia
(Delaware) Middletown, Delaware; M O T LL; East	(Quebec) Mirabel, Quebec; Diamond Baseball LL; Canada
(Georgia (U.S. state)) Macon, Georgia; Vine Ingle LL; Southeast	Mannheim, Germany; South-West Germany LL; Europe–Africa
(Louisiana) Kenner, Louisiana; Eastbank LL; Southwest	(Curaçao) Willemstad, Curaçao; Pabao LL; Latin America
(California) San Diego, California; Scripps Ranch LL; West	Guaynabo, Puerto Rico; Guaynabo Baseball LL; Puerto Rico

== Results ==
United States Bracket

Upper round 1
—	(Delaware) East	4
—	(Georgia (U.S. state)) Southeast	6
—	(Louisiana) Southwest	8
—	(Indiana) Central	2
Lower round 1
0–1	(Delaware) East	5
0–1	(California) Host	6
0–1	(Indiana) Central	4
1–1	(Georgia (U.S. state)) Southeast	6

Upper round 2
–	(California) West	12
1–0	(Georgia (U.S. state)) Southeast	9
–	(California) Host	2
1–0	(Louisiana) Southwest	4
Lower round 2
1–1	(California) Host	5
2–1	(Georgia (U.S. state)) Southeast	4

Upper final
1–0	(California) West	1
2–0	(Louisiana) Southwest	11
Lower final
1–1	(California) West	5
2–1	(California) Host	12

United States Championship
3–0	(Louisiana) Southwest	3
3–1	(California) Host	1

International Bracket

Upper round 1
—	Puerto Rico	12
—	Canada	4
—	Germany	0
—	South Korea	8
Lower round 1
0–1	Canada	2
0–1	Australia	3
0–1	Germany	1
1–1	Puerto Rico	7

Upper round 2
–	(Curaçao) Curacao	10
1–0	Puerto Rico	4
–	Australia	1
1–0	South Korea	8
Lower round 2
1–1	Australia	3
2–1	Puerto Rico	8

Upper final
1–0	(Curaçao) Curacao	3
2–0	South Korea	1
Lower final
2–1	South Korea	2
3–1	Puerto Rico	1

International Championship
2–0	(Curaçao) Curacao	4
3–1	South Korea	5

Consolation round

—
0–2	(Delaware) East	0
0–2	Germany	3

—
0–2	Canada	2
0–2	(Indiana) Central	7

Elimination Round

Semifinals
3–0	(Louisiana) Southwest	3
3–1	(California) Host	1
2–0	(Curaçao) Curacao	4
3–1	South Korea	5

World Championship
4–0	(Louisiana) Southwest	8
4–1	South Korea	7

2024 Intermediate League World Series Champions
Eastbank LL
Kenner, Louisiana
