= 2016 Intermediate League World Series =

Tournament information
- Location: Livermore, California
- Dates: July 31–August 7

Final positions
- Champions: Wailuku, Hawaii
- Runner-up: Seoul, South Korea

The 2016 Intermediate League World Series took place from July 31–August 7 in Livermore, California, United States. Wailuku, Hawaii defeated Seoul, South Korea in the championship game.

== Teams ==
United States	International
Danville, California; District 57 (Tassajara Valley); Host	Seoul, South Korea; West Seoul; Asia–Pacific
Bedford, Indiana; Bedford; Central	Lethbridge, Alberta; Lethbridge Southwest; Canada
Vineland, New Jersey; N/S Vineland/Milville American; East	Brno, Czech Republic; South Czech Republic; Europe–Africa
Parkland, Florida; Parkland; Southeast	Willemstad, Curaçao; Liga Pabao; Latin America
Houston, Texas; West University; Southwest	Guayama, Puerto Rico; Radames Lopez; Puerto Rico
Wailuku, Hawaii; Central East Maui; West	

== Results ==
United States Bracket

Upper round 1
—	New Jersey	1
—	Florida	5
—	California	5
—	Texas	3
Lower round 1
0–1	New Jersey	4
0–1	Indiana	8
0–1	Hawaii (F/6)	14
0–1	Texas	4

Upper round 2
—	Hawaii	4
1–0	Florida (F/9)	5
—	Indiana	5
1–0	California	8
Lower round 2
1–1	Indiana	1
1–1	Hawaii (F/6)	11

Upper final
2–0	Florida	2
2–0	California	0
Lower final
2–1	California	0
2–1	Hawaii (F/6)	10

United States Championship
3–0	Florida	3
3–1	Hawaii	5

International Bracket

Upper round 1
—	Curaçao (F/5)	11
—	Czech Republic	0
Lower round 1
0–1	Czech Republic	4
0–1	Canada	10

Upper round 2
—	South Korea	4
1–0	Curaçao	3
—	Canada	4
—	Puerto Rico	6
Lower round 2
1–1	Curaçao	10
1–1	Canada	7

Upper final
1–0	South Korea	12
1–0	Puerto Rico	2
Lower final
1–1	Puerto Rico	1
2–1	Curaçao	8

International Championship
2–0	South Korea (F/5)	14
3–1	Curaçao	0

Consolation Round

—
0–2	New Jersey	13
0–2	Czech Republic	2

—
0–2	Texas	5
1–2	Canada	6

Elimination Round

Semifinals
3–0	Florida	3
3–1	Hawaii	5
2–0	South Korea (F/5)	14
3–1	Curaçao	0

World Championship
4–1	Hawaii	5
3–0	South Korea	1

2016 Intermediate League World Series Champions
Central East Maui LL
Wailuku, Hawaii
