= 2025 Intermediate League World Series =

Baseball tournament

Tournament information
- Location: Livermore, California
- Dates: July 27–August 3

Final positions
- Champions: Valencia, Venezuela
- Runner-up: Wailuku, Hawaii

The 2025 Intermediate League World Series took place from July 27–August 3 in Livermore, California. Valencia, Venezuela defeated Wailuku, Hawaii in the championship game.

== Teams ==
United States	International
(California) Danville, California; Danville LL; Host	(South Korea) Seoul, South Korea; West Seoul LL; Asia–Pacific
(Wisconsin) Whitefish Bay, Wisconsin; Whitefish Bay LL; Central	(New South Wales) Sydney, Australia; Hills LL; Australia
(New Jersey) Freehold Township, New Jersey; Freehold Township LL; East	(British Columbia) Coquitlam, British Columbia; Coquitlam LL; Canada
(South Carolina) Irmo, South Carolina; Irmo LL; Southeast	Brno, Czech Republic; South Czech Republic LL; Europe–Africa
(Louisiana) New Orleans, Louisiana; Greater New Orleans LL; Southwest	(Venezuela) Valencia, Venezuela; Flor Amarillo LL; Latin America
(Hawaii) Wailuku, Hawaii; Central Maui LL; West	Tamaulipas, Mexico; Santa Maria de Aguayo LL; Mexico

== Results ==
United States Bracket

Upper round 1
—	Wisconsin	7
—	New Jersey	0
—	South Carolina	7
—	(California) Host	9
Lower round 1
0—1	South Carolina	10
1—1	Wisconsin	3
0—1	New Jersey	4
1—1	(California) Host	2

Upper round 2
—	Louisiana	5
1—0	Wisconsin	4
—	Hawaii (F/4)	17
1—0	(California) Host	2
Lower round 2
1—1	South Carolina	6
1—1	New Jersey	3

Upper final
1—0	Louisiana	0
1—0	Hawaii	7
Lower final
1—1	Louisiana	5
2—1	South Carolina	3

United States Championship
2—0	Hawaii	7
2—1	Louisiana	3

International Bracket

Upper round 1
—	Venezuela	2
—	Mexico	0
—	Canada	9
—	Czech Republic	7
Lower round 1
0—1	Czech Republic	6
0—1	Australia (F/8)	7
0—1	Mexico	3
1—1	Canada	1

Upper round 2
–	Australia	0
1—0	Venezuela (F/5)	18
–	South Korea	11
1—0	Canada	4
Lower round 2
1—1	Australia	6
1—1	Mexico	11

Upper final
2—0	Venezuela (F/6)	15
1—0	South Korea	3
Lower final
1—1	South Korea	4
2—1	Mexico	7

International Championship
3—0	Venezuela	2
3—1	Mexico	0

Consolation round

—
1–2	(California) Host	5
0–2	Czech Republic	3

—
1–2	Canada	4
1–2	Wisconsin	3

World Championship

World Championship
4–0	Venezuela	12
3–0	Hawaii	7

2025 Intermediate League World Series Champions
Flor Amarillo LL
Valencia, Venezuela
