= 2015 Intermediate League World Series =

Tournament information
- Location: Livermore, California
- Dates: August 2–8

Final positions
- Champions: Seoul, South Korea
- Runner-up: Wellington, Florida

The 2015 Intermediate League World Series took place from August 2–8 in Livermore, California, United States. Seoul, South Korea defeated Wellington, Florida in the championship game.

== Teams ==
United States	International
Danville, California; District 57; Host	Seoul, South Korea; West Seoul; Asia–Pacific
Coon Rapids, Minnesota; Coon Rapids/Andover; Central	Châteauguay, Quebec; NDG/Chateauguay; Canada
(New York (state)) Commack, New York; Commack North; East	Brno, Czech Republic; South Moravia; Europe–Africa
Wellington, Florida; Wellington; Southeast	(United States Virgin Islands) St. Thomas, U.S. Virgin Islands; Elrod Hendricks West; Latin America
Laredo, Texas; Northside; Southwest	Humacao, Puerto Rico; Miguel Luzunaris; Puerto Rico
Kawaihae, Hawaii; Kawaihae; West	

== Results ==
United States Bracket

Upper round 1
—	Hawaii	5
—	Minnesota	9
—	(New York (state)) New York	8
—	California	7
Lower round 1
1–1	Minnesota	8
0–1	California (F/8)	9
0–1	Hawaii	1
1–1	(New York (state)) New York	6

Upper round 2
—	Texas	3
1–0	Minnesota	0
—	Florida	8
1–0	(New York (state)) New York	0
Lower round 2
1–1	California	5
2–1	(New York (state)) New York	6

Upper final
1–0	Texas	1
1–0	Florida	3
Lower final
1–1	Texas	11
3–1	(New York (state)) New York (F/8)	15

United States Championship
2–0	Florida	4
4–1	(New York (state)) New York	3

International Bracket

Upper round 1
—	South Korea	8
—	(United States Virgin Islands) U.S. Virgin Islands	4
Lower round 1
0–1	(United States Virgin Islands) U.S. Virgin Islands	9
0–1	Canada	2

Upper round 2
—	Czech Republic	0
1–0	South Korea (F/5)	17
—	Puerto Rico	9
—	Canada	4
Lower round 2
0–1	Czech Republic	5
1–1	(United States Virgin Islands) U.S. Virgin Islands	7

Upper final
2–0	South Korea	10
1–0	Puerto Rico	5
Lower final
1–1	Puerto Rico	6
2–1	(United States Virgin Islands) U.S. Virgin Islands	0

International Championship
3–0	South Korea (F/6)	11
2–1	Puerto Rico	1

Consolation Round

—
1–2	Minnesota	2
0–2	Canada	6

—
0–2	Hawaii	11
0–2	Czech Republic	0

Elimination Round

Semifinals
2–0	Florida	4
4–1	(New York (state)) New York	3
3–0	South Korea (F/6)	11
2–1	Puerto Rico	1

World Championship
3–0	Florida	5
4–0	South Korea	10

2015 Intermediate League World Series Champions
West Seoul LL
Seoul, South Korea
