= 2013 Little League Intermediate World Series =

Children's baseball competition

2013 Little League Intermediate World Series relays the results and standings for the 2013 Little League Intermediate World Series. This event included six American teams and four non-American teams of junior baseball players in competition.

== Teams ==
Each team that competes in the tournament will come out of one of the 10 regions.

United States	International
Jenison, Michigan; Central Region; Georgetown LL	Osaka, Japan; Asia Pacific; Izumisano LL
Collier Township, Pennsylvania; East Region; Collier Township/Chartiers Valley LL	Lethbridge, Alberta; Canada; Southwest LL
Rutherfordton, North Carolina; Southeast Region; Rutherfordton LL	Yabucoa, Puerto Rico; Puerto Rico; Juan Antonio Bibiloni LL
Houston, Texas; Southwest Region; Post Oak LL	Guayaquil, Ecuador; Latin America; C Unidas Miraflores LL
Nogales, Arizona; West Region; Nogales National LL
Pleasanton, California; California District 57; Pleasanton National LL

== Results ==
=== United States Bracket ===
Upper round 1
–	(California) CA District 57	12
–	(Michigan) Central	0
–	(Texas) Southwest	6
–	(Pennsylvania) East	4
Lower round 1
0–1	(Pennsylvania) East	7
0–1	(Arizona) West	3
0–1	(Michigan) Central	5
0–1	(North Carolina) Southeast	4

Upper round 2
–	(Arizona) West	3
1–0	(California) CA District 57	6
–	(North Carolina) Southeast	1
1–0	(Texas) Southwest	12
Lower round 2
1–1	(Pennsylvania) East	4
1–1	(Michigan) Central	3

Upper final
2–0	(California) CA District 57	5
2–0	(Texas) Southwest	6
Lower final
2–1	(California) CA District 57	1
2–1	(Pennsylvania) East	3

Final
3–0	(Texas) Southwest	4
3–1	(Pennsylvania) East	5

=== International Bracket ===
First Round
-	(Ecuador) Latin America	3
–	Puerto Rico	7
–	Canada	1
–	(Japan) Asia-Pacific	19
Lower round 1
0–1	(Ecuador) Latin America	5
0–1	Canada	4

International Semifinal
1–0	(Japan) Asia-Pacific	10
1–0	Puerto Rico	0
Lower final
1–1	Puerto Rico	7
1–1	(Ecuador) Latin America	6

International Championship
2–0	(Japan) Asia-Pacific
2–1	Puerto Rico

== See also ==
- 2013 Intermediate League World Series
