= 2014 Intermediate League World Series =

Tournament information
- Location: Livermore, California
- Dates: July 29–August 4

Final positions
- Champions: Nogales, Arizona
- Runner-up: San Lorenzo, Puerto Rico

The 2014 Intermediate League World Series took place from July 29–August 4 in Livermore, California, United States. Nogales, Arizona defeated San Lorenzo, Puerto Rico in the championship game.

This year featured the debut of the Europe–Africa Region.

== Teams ==
United States	International
San Ramon, California; District 57 (Canyon Creek); Host	Gyeonggi, South Korea; Gyeonggi; Asia–Pacific
Taylor, Michigan; Taylor; Central	Surrey, British Columbia; Whalley; Canada
Berlin, Maryland; Berlin; East	Brno, Czech Republic; South Moravia; Europe–Africa
Barboursville, West Virginia; Barboursville; Southeast	Willemstad, Curaçao; Pabao; Latin America
Midland, Texas; Mid City; Southwest	San Lorenzo, Puerto Rico; Samaritana; Puerto Rico
Nogales, Arizona; Nogales National; West	

== Results ==
United States Bracket

Upper round 1
—	Michigan	2
—	Maryland	8
—	West Virginia (F/5)	12
—	California	2
Lower round 1
0–1	Michigan	1
1–1	West Virginia	5
0–1	Texas	4
0–1	California	1

Upper round 2
—	Texas	8
1–0	Maryland	11
—	Arizona (F/5)	13
1–0	West Virginia	2
Lower round 2
2–1	West Virginia	5
1–1	Texas	8

Upper final
2–0	Maryland	1
1–0	Arizona	4
Lower final
2–1	Maryland	8
2–1	Texas	2

United States Championship
2–0	Arizona	6
3–1	Maryland	5

International Bracket

Upper round 1
—	South Korea	2
—	Puerto Rico	7
Lower round 1
0–1	South Korea (F/8)	9
0–1	Canada	2

Upper round 2
—	Czech Republic	2
1–0	Puerto Rico (F/6)	17
—	Curaçao	11
—	Canada	1
Lower round 2
0–1	Czech Republic	3
1–1	South Korea	4

Upper final
2–0	Puerto Rico	6
1–0	Curaçao	4
Lower final
1–1	Curaçao (F/9)	5
2–1	South Korea	3

International Championship
3–0	Puerto Rico	3
2–1	Curaçao	2

Consolation round

—
0–2	Michigan	6
0–2	Canada	7

—
0–2	California	9
0–2	Czech Republic	6

Elimination Round

Semifinals
2–0	Arizona	6
3–1	Maryland	5
3–0	Puerto Rico	3
2–1	Curaçao	2

World Championship
3–0	Arizona	11
4–0	Puerto Rico	4

2014 Intermediate League World Series Champions
Nogales National LL
Nogales, Arizona
