= Intermediate League World Series (Latin America Region) =

Latin America Region
- Most recent season or competition: 2026 Intermediate League World Series
- Sport: Baseball
- Founded: 2013
- Most recent champion: Santa Cruz, Aruba
- Most titles: Curaçao (4)

The Intermediate League World Series (ILWS) Latin America Region and Puerto Rico Region are two of six international regions that currently send teams to the World Series in Livermore, California. The regions' participation in the ILWS dates back to 2013.

== Latin America Region Countries ==
- Argentina
- Aruba
- Bonaire
- Colombia
- Curaçao
- El Salvador
- Dominican Republic
- Mexico
- US Virgin Islands
- Venezuela

== Region Champions ==
As of the 2026 Intermediate League World Series.

Prior to 2019, the champion of Puerto Rico received an automatic bid to the World Series. Beginning in 2019, the Mexico Region has an automatic berth in odd-numbered years; while the Puerto Rico Region has one in even-numbered years. For years without an automatic bid, they compete in the Latin America Region tournament.

=== Latin America Region Champions ===
Year	City	ILWS	Record
2013	Guayaquil, Ecuador	Round 2	1–3
2014	Willemstad, Curaçao	Int'l Final	2–2
2015	(United States Virgin Islands) St. Thomas, U.S. Virgin Islands	Round 3	2–2
2016	Willemstad, Curaçao	Int'l Final	3–2
2017	Maracaibo, Venezuela	Int'l Final	3–2
2018	Reynosa, Mexico (Host)	Round 3	2–2
2019	Guayama, Puerto Rico	Round 3	2–2
2020	Cancelled due to COVID-19 pandemic		
2021	Cancelled due to COVID-19 pandemic		
2022	Willemstad, Curaçao	Round 2	1–2
2023	Guaynabo, Puerto Rico	Round 3	2–2
2024	Willemstad, Curaçao	Int'l Final	2–1
2025	Valencia, Venezuela	Champions	5–0
2026	Santa Cruz, Aruba	Round 3	2–2

Puerto Rico Region Champions

Year	City	ILWS	Record
2013	(Puerto Rico) Yabucoa	Int'l Final	2–2
2014	(Puerto Rico) San Lorenzo	Runner-up	4–1
2015	(Puerto Rico) Humacao	Int'l Final	2–2
2016	(Puerto Rico) Guayama	Not in Top 4	1–2
2017	(Puerto Rico) Guayama	Champions	5–0
2018	(Puerto Rico) Guayama	Int'l Final	3–2
2022	(Puerto Rico) Caguas	Int'l Final	2–2
2024	(Puerto Rico) Guaynabo	Round 3	3–2
2026	(Puerto Rico) Yabucoa	Int'l Final	2–1

Mexico Region Champions

Year	City	ILWS	Record
2019	(Mexico) Matamoros	Runner-up	4–2
2023	(Mexico) Navojoa	Int'l Final	3–1
2025	(Mexico) Ciudad Victoria	Int'l Final	3–2

=== Results by Country ===
As of the 2026 Intermediate League World Series.

Country	Latin America Championships	ILWS Appearances	ILWS Championships	W–L	PCT
Curaçao	4	4	0	8–7	.533
Puerto Rico	2	11	1	28–18	.609
Venezuela	2	2	1	8–2	.800
(United States Virgin Islands) U.S. Virgin Islands	1	1	0	2–2	.500
(Mexico) Host Team(s)	1	1	0	2–2	.500
Aruba	1	1	0	2–2	.500
Ecuador	1	1	0	1–3	.250
Mexico	0	3	0	10–5	.667
Total	12	24	2	61–41	.598

== See also ==
- Baseball awards § World
- Baseball awards § Americas

Latin America Region in other Little League divisions

- Little League – Latin America
- Little League – Caribbean
- Little League – Mexico
- Junior League
- Senior League – Latin America
- Senior League – Caribbean
- Big League
