= Intermediate, Junior, Senior & Big League Baseball =

Divisions of Little League Baseball

Intermediate, Junior, and Senior League Baseball
- Intermediate, Junior, and Senior League Baseball are divisions of Little League Baseball.
- Sport: Baseball
- Founded: 1981
- Founder: Carl Stotz
- Broadcasters: ABC, ESPN
- Website: http://www.littleleague.org/

Intermediate, Junior, and Senior League Baseball are youth baseball divisions of Little League Baseball that are considered more advanced and difficult than younger Little League divisions due to more advanced rules, including the ability to lead-off and steal as the pitcher breaks, along with longer base paths and greater pitching distance. Junior League also includes the use of bats with 2 5/8-inch (6.7 cm) barrels rather than the transitional 2 1/4-inch (5.7 cm) barrels of Little League. Junior League also allows the use of metal spikes in cleats in addition to the molded or plastic spikes used in Little League. The Big League level was a former division for even older teens until it was discontinued for both baseball and softball after the 2016 Big League World Series due to low participation levels over the previous 15 years.

== Age divisions ==
=== Intermediate League ===
Intermediate League Baseball is for aged 11 to 13 years old.

=== Junior League ===
Junior League Baseball is for youth aged 12 to 14 years old.

=== Senior League ===
Senior League Baseball is for youth aged 13 to 16 years old.

=== Big League ===
Big League Baseball was for youth ages 16 to 18 years old. It was discontinued after the 2016 Big League World Series.

== Tournament venues ==
=== Intermediate League World Series ===
The tournament is held in Livermore, California.

=== Junior League World Series ===
The tournament is held in Taylor, Michigan's Heritage Park.

=== Senior League World Series ===
The tournament had been held in Bangor, Maine from 2002-2016, now held in Easley, South Carolina 2017-Present

=== Big League World Series ===
The Big League World Series was held from 1968 to 2016. The tournament's final host was Easley, South Carolina, from 2000 to the last tournament in 2016. The tournament had previously been in Charlotte, North Carolina from 1968 to 1970 and in Fort Lauderdale, Florida from 1970 to 1998. It was also held in Tucson, Arizona from 1999 to 2000.

== Regions ==
=== Little League World Series regions ===
See: Little League World Series#Regions

For the Little League baseball division, there are eighteen regions, whose champions are divided into two brackets (U.S. and International). The ten U.S. regions are: New England, Great Lakes, Mid-Atlantic, Metro, Midwest, Mountain, Southeast, Southwest, Northwest (including Alaska), and West (including Hawaii). The eight international regions are: Asia-Pacific, Australia, Canada, Caribbean (including Cuba and Puerto Rico), Europe-Africa, Japan, Latin America (Central America and South America), and Mexico.

=== U.S. regions in the Intermediate, Junior, Senior, and Big League divisions ===
Note: The Big League division was discontinued after 2016.

For the Intermediate, Junior, and Senior League baseball divisions, there are only five U.S. regions:

- Central (Little League Great Lakes and Midwest regions combined)
- East (Little League Mid-Atlantic and New England regions combined)
- Southeast (same as Little League Southeast region)
- Southwest (same as Little League Southwest region)
- West (Little League West and Northwest regions combined)

=== International regions ===
The international regions differ in the Intermediate, Junior, Senior, and Big League divisions.

==== Intermediate League regions ====
Unlike the Little League World Series, the Intermediate League World Series has (1) only ten regions and (2) a host team. There are two pools: Pool A (U.S. regional champions and the host team) and Pool B (international regional champions).

The Intermediate League has five international regions:

- Puerto Rico
- Latin America (Little League Caribbean, Latin America, and Mexico regions combined, except that Puerto Rico is not included in the Caribbean Region)
- Canada
- Asia-Pacific
- Europe-Africa

==== Junior League regions ====
Unlike the Little League World Series, the Junior League World Series has only eleven regions, whose champions are divided into the United States Pool and the International Pool.

The Junior League has six international regions:

- Mexico / Puerto Rico (automatic berth in even and odd years, respectively) (region unique to Big League and Junior League)
- Latin America (Little League Caribbean and Latin America regions combined, except that only Mexico or Puerto Rico is included in odd and even years, respectively)
- Canada (same as Little League Canada region)
- Australia (same as Little League Australia region)
- Asia-Pacific (combination of Asia-Pacific countries in the Little League Asia-Pacific and Middle East region with Japan region)
- EMEA (Europe, Middle East, and Africa) (combination of Little League Europe and Africa region, plus Middle Eastern countries)

==== Senior League regions ====
Unlike the Little League World Series, the Senior League World Series (1) has only nine regions, (2) has a host team (from a South Carolina district, starting in 2017; from Maine District 3 through 2016), and (3) the regional champions (plus the host team) are divided into two mixed pools (Group A and Group B) that combine U.S. and international regions. Because of the mixed pools, the Senior League division does not have an international champion and a United States champion — unlike the other three baseball divisions of Little League Baseball.

The Senior League has only four international regions:

- Latin America (Little League Caribbean, Latin America, and Mexico regions combined)
- Canada (same as Little League Canada region)
- Asia-Pacific (Asia-Pacific countries from the Little League Asia-Pacific and Middle East region, plus Australia and Japan regions)
- EMEA (Europe, Middle East, and Africa) (Little League Europe and Africa region, plus Middle Eastern countries)

==== Big League regions ====
The Big League World Series was held from 1968 to 2016. During its final years, it differed from the Little League World Series in that it (1) had only ten regions, divided into Pool A (U.S.) and Pool B (International), and (2) had a host team (South Carolina District 1), which played in the U.S. pool.

The Big League had five international regions:

- Mexico / Puerto Rico (automatic berth in even and odd years, respectively) (region unique to Big League and Junior League)
- Latin America (Little League Caribbean and Latin America regions combined, except that only Mexico or Puerto Rico was included in odd or even years, respectively)
- Canada (same as Little League Canada region)
- Asia-Pacific (Asia-Pacific countries from the Little League Asia-Pacific and Middle East region, plus Australia and Japan regions)
- EMEA (Europe, Middle East, and Africa) (Little League Europe and Africa region, plus Middle Eastern countries)

== Playing field ==
The distance between the bases was 90 feet, the same as for regulation Major League Baseball fields. The distance between the pitcher's mound and home plate was 60.6 feet, also identical to that of MLB. The minimum outfield distance in the upper divisions was 300 feet, while the maximum for Big League was 425 feet.

== Game length ==
A game consisted of seven innings (same as in high-school baseball) and was official if five innings had been completed.

== See also ==
- Little League World Series
- Junior League World Series (softball)
- Little League Softball World Series
- 2009 Little League Philippine Series (including Junior, Senior, and Big League World Series)
- Amateur baseball in the United States
- Major League Baseball
- List of organized baseball leagues
- Baseball awards § World (world, international-bracket, and regional champions)
- Baseball awards § U.S. youth baseball (national, regional, and state champions)
- Baseball clothing and equipment
