= Intermediate League World Series (South Region) =

Southeast Region
- Most recent season or competition: 2026 Intermediate League World Series
- Sport: Baseball
- Founded: 2013
- No. of teams: 8
- Country: United States
- Most recent champion: Tampa, Florida
- Most titles: Florida (7)

Southwest Region
- Most recent season or competition: 2026 Intermediate League World Series
- Sport: Baseball
- Founded: 2013
- No. of teams: 8
- Country: United States
- Most recent champion: Kenner, Louisiana
- Most titles: Louisiana (4); West Texas (4)

The Intermediate League World Series (ILWS) Southeast Region and Southwest Region are two of the six United States regions that currently send teams to the World Series in Livermore, California. The two regions were created in 2013, when the ILWS began (as a new Little League Baseball World Series).

== Southeast Region and Southwest Region states ==
Southeast Region

- Alabama
- Florida
- (Georgia (U.S. state)) Georgia
- North Carolina
- South Carolina
- Tennessee
- Virginia
- West Virginia

Southwest Region

- Arkansas
- Colorado
- Louisiana
- Mississippi
- New Mexico
- Oklahoma
- Texas (East)
- Texas (West)

== Region Champions ==
As of the 2026 Intermediate League World Series.

Southeast Region Champions

Year	City	ILWS	Record
2013	Rutherfordton, North Carolina	Round 1	1–2
2014	Barboursville, West Virginia	Round 2	2–2
2015	Wellington, Florida	Runner-up	3–1
2016	Parkland, Florida	US Final	3–1
2017	North Palm Beach, Florida	Round 1	1–2
2018	Boynton Beach, Florida	US Final	2–1
2019	McCalla, Alabama	Champions	5–0
2020	Cancelled due to COVID-19 pandemic		
2021	Cancelled due to COVID-19 pandemic		
2022	Fort Lauderdale, Florida	Round 1	0–3
2023	Tampa, Florida	Runner-up	4–1
2024	(Georgia (U.S. state)) Macon, Georgia	Round 2	2–2
2025	Irmo, South Carolina	Round 3	2–2
2026	Tampa, Florida	Round 2	1–2

Southwest Region Champions

Year	City	ILWS	Record
2013	Houston, East Texas	US Final	3–1
2014	Midland, West Texas	Round 3	2–2
2015	Laredo, West Texas	Round 3	1–2
2016	Houston, East Texas	Round 1	0–3
2017	San Angelo, West Texas	Round 2	1–2
2018	Midland, West Texas	Round 3	2–2
2019	Roswell, New Mexico	US Final	3–2
2020	Cancelled due to COVID-19 pandemic		
2021	Cancelled due to COVID-19 pandemic		
2022	Needville, East Texas	Round 1	2–2
2023	Gonzales, Louisiana	Round 1	1–2
2024	Kenner, Louisiana	Champions	5–0
2025	New Orleans, Louisiana	US Final	2–2
2026	Kenner, Louisiana	Round 1	1–2

=== Results by State ===
As of the 2026 Intermediate League World Series.

State	Region Championships	ILWS Championships	W–L	PCT
Florida	7	0	14–11	.560
Alabama	1	1	5–0	1.000
West Virginia	1	0	2–2	.500
(Georgia (U.S. state)) Georgia	1	0	2–2	.500
South Carolina	1	0	2–2	.500
North Carolina	1	0	1–2	.333
Total	12	1	26–19	.578

State	Region Championships	ILWS Championships	W–L	PCT
Louisiana	4	1	9–6	.600
West Texas	4	0	6–8	.429
East Texas	3	0	5–6	.455
New Mexico	1	0	3–2	.600
Total	12	1	23–22	.511

== See also ==
South Region in other Little League divisions

- Little League – South 1957-2000
  - Little League – Southeast
  - Little League – Southwest
- Junior League
- Senior League
- Big League
