= 2023 Intermediate League World Series =

Tournament information
- Location: Livermore, California
- Dates: July 30–August 6

Final positions
- Champions: Seoul, South Korea
- Runner-up: Tampa, Florida

The 2023 Intermediate League World Series took place from July 30–August 6 in Livermore, California. Seoul, South Korea defeated Tampa, Florida in the championship game.

== Teams ==
| United States | International |
|---|---|
| (California) San Ramon, California; Bollinger Canyon LL; Host | (South Korea) Seoul, South Korea; West Seoul LL; Asia–Pacific |
| (Michigan) Taylor, Michigan; Taylor North LL; Central | (Western Australia) Brisbane, Australia; Brisbane North LL; Australia |
| (New Jersey) Toms River, New Jersey; Toms River East LL; East | (British Columbia) Vancouver, British Columbia; South Vancouver LL; Canada |
| (Florida) Tampa, Florida; Keystone LL; Southeast | Prague, Czech Republic; Northwest Czech Republic LL; Europe–Africa |
| (Louisiana) Gonzales, Louisiana; Ascension Parish LL; Southwest | (Puerto Rico) Guaynabo, Puerto Rico; Amelia Guaynabo Baseball LL; Latin America |
| (Hawaii) Pearl City, Hawaii; Pearl City LL; West | Navojoa, Mexico; Mario Mendoza LL; Mexico |

== Results ==
United States Bracket

Upper round 1
— | (Florida) Southeast | 5
— | (California) Host | 4
— | (Hawaii) West | 8
— | (Louisiana) Southwest | 4
Lower round 1
0–1 | (California) Host | 2
0–1 | (Michigan) Central | 5
0–1 | (Louisiana) Southwest | 4
0–1 | (New Jersey) East | 5

Upper round 2
– | (New Jersey) East | 2
1–0 | (Florida) Southeast | 3
– | (Michigan) Central | 2
1–0 | (Hawaii) West | 4
Lower round 2
1–1 | (Michigan) Central | 4
1–1 | (New Jersey) East | 5

Upper final
2–0 | (Florida) Southeast | 6
2–0 | (Hawaii) West | 4
Lower final
2–1 | (Hawaii) West | 2
2–1 | (New Jersey) East | 1

United States Championship
3–0 | (Florida) Southeast | 5
3–1 | (Hawaii) West | 4

International Bracket

Upper round 1
— | Mexico | 8
— | Puerto Rico | 0
— | Australia | 5
— | Czech Republic | 0
Lower round 1
0–1 | Puerto Rico | 22
1–1 | Australia | 2
0–1 | Czech Republic | 0
0–1 | Canada (F/5) | 13

Upper round 2
– | Canada | 0
1–0 | Mexico | 10
– | South Korea | 5
1–0 | Australia | 1
Lower round 2
1–1 | Puerto Rico | 4
1–1 | Canada | 1

Upper final
2–0 | Mexico | 7
1–0 | South Korea | 6
Lower final
1–1 | South Korea | 11
2–1 | Puerto Rico | 1

International Championship
3–0 | Mexico | 1
2–1 | South Korea | 2

Consolation round

| — |
| 0–2 | (California) Host | 10 |
| 0–2 | Czech Republic | 3 |

| — |
| 0–2 | (Louisiana) Southwest | 7 |
| 1–2 | Australia | 3 |

Elimination Round

Semifinals
3–0 | (Florida) Southeast | 5
3–1 | (Hawaii) West | 4
3–0 | Mexico | 1
2–1 | South Korea | 2

World Championship
4–0 | (Florida) Southeast | 4
3–1 | South Korea | 11

2023 Intermediate League World Series Champions
West Seoul LL
Seoul, South Korea
