= Intermediate League World Series (Central Region) =

Central Region
- Most recent season or competition: 2026 Intermediate League World Series
- Sport: Baseball
- Founded: 2013
- No. of teams: 13
- Country: United States
- Most recent champion: Fargo, North Dakota
- Most titles: Indiana (5)

The Intermediate League World Series Central Region is one of six United States regions that currently sends teams to the World Series in Livermore, California. The region's participation in the ILWS dates back to 2013.

== Central Region States ==
- Illinois
- Indiana
- Iowa
- Kansas
- Kentucky
- Michigan
- Minnesota
- Missouri
- Nebraska
- North Dakota
- Ohio
- South Dakota
- Wisconsin

== Region Champions ==
As of the 2026 Intermediate League World Series.

Year	City	ILWS	Record
2013	Jenison, Michigan	Round 2	1–2
2014	Taylor, Michigan	Round 1	0–3
2015	Coon Rapids, Minnesota	Round 1	1–3
2016	Bedford, Indiana	Round 2	1–2
2017	Georgetown, Indiana	Round 1	0–3
2018	Ankeny, Iowa	Round 2	1–2
2019	Georgetown, Indiana	Round 3	2–2
2020	Cancelled due to COVID-19 pandemic		
2021	Cancelled due to COVID-19 pandemic		
2022	Georgetown, Indiana	Round 3	1–2
2023	Taylor, Michigan	Round 2	1–2
2024	Georgetown, Indiana	Round 1	1–2
2025	Whitefish Bay, Wisconsin	Round 1	1–3
2026	Fargo, North Dakota	Round 3	2–2

=== Results by State ===
As of the 2026 Intermediate League World Series.

State	Region Championships	ILWS Championships	W–L	PCT
Indiana	5	0	5–11	.313
Michigan	3	0	2–7	.222
North Dakota	1	0	2–2	.500
Iowa	1	0	1–2	.333
Minnesota	1	0	1–3	.250
Wisconsin	1	0	1–3	.250
Total	12	0	12–28	.300

== See also ==
Central Region in other Little League divisions

- Little League – Central 1957-2000
  - Little League – Great Lakes
  - Little League – Midwest
- Junior League
- Senior League
- Big League
