= 2026 Intermediate League World Series =

Baseball tournament

Tournament information
- Location: Livermore, California
- Dates: August 2–August 9

Final positions
- Champions: Seoul, South Korea
- Runner-up: Livermore, California

The 2026 Intermediate League World Series took place from August 2–9 in Livermore, California. Seoul, South Korea defeated Livermore, California in the championship game.

== Teams ==
United States	International
(California) San Ramon, California; Bollinger Canyon LL; Host	(South Korea) Seoul, South Korea; West Seoul A LL; Asia–Pacific
(North Dakota) Fargo, North Dakota; Fargo LL; Central	(South Australia) Adelaide, South Australia; Northern Adelaide Districts LL; Australia
(Pennsylvania) West Chester, Pennsylvania; East Side LL; East	Victoria, British Columbia; Hampton LL; Canada
(Florida) Tampa, Florida; Bayshore LL; Southeast	Brno, Czechia; South Czech Republic LL; Europe–Africa
(Louisiana) Kenner, Louisiana; Eastbank LL; Southwest	Santa Cruz, Aruba; Aruba Center LL; Latin America
(California) Livermore, California; Granada LL; West	Yabucoa, Puerto Rico Puerto Rico

== Results ==
United States Bracket

Upper round 1
—	(California) Host	8
—	Florida	5
—	Pennsylvania	2
—	North Dakota	3
Lower round 1
0—1	Florida	7
0—1	Louisiana	5
0—1	Pennsylvania	10
1—1	(California) Host	11

Upper round 2
—	California	16
1—0	(California) Host	6
—	Louisiana	5
1—0	North Dakota	7
Lower round 2
1—1	Florida	1
2—1	(California) Host	11

Upper final
1—0	California	17
2—0	North Dakota	0
Lower final
2—1	North Dakota	0
3—1	(California) Host	25

United States Championship
2—0	California	5
4—1	(California) Host	3

International Bracket

Upper round 1
—	Australia	0
—	South Korea	10
—	Canada	2
—	Czechia	4
Lower round 1
0—1	Australia	1
1—1	Czechia	11
0—1	Canada	0
0—1	Aruba	10

Upper round 2
–	Aruba	5
1—0	South Korea	6
–	Puerto Rico	15
1—0	Czechia	2
Lower round 2
2—1	Czechia	5
1—1	Aruba	9

Upper final
2—0	South Korea	1
1—0	Puerto Rico	2
Lower final
2—1	South Korea	5
2—1	Aruba	4

International Championship
2—0	Puerto Rico	8
3—1	South Korea	13

Consolation round

—
0–2	Pennsylvania	9
0–2	Australia	4

—
0–2	Louisiana	14
0–2	Canada	2

World Championship

World Championship
3–0	California	4
4–1	South Korea	11

2026 Intermediate League World Series Champions
West Seoul A LL
Seoul, South Korea
