= Intermediate League World Series =

International children's baseball tournament

- Current season, competition or edition: 2026 Intermediate League World Series
- Sport: Baseball
- Founded: 2013
- No. of teams: 12
- Countries: International
- Most recent champions: Seoul, South Korea
- Most titles: South Korea (4)
- Website: LittleLeague.org

See: Intermediate League Baseball

The Intermediate League World Series is a baseball tournament for children aged 11 to 13 years old that began in 2013. It is patterned after the Little League World Series, which was named for the World Series in Major League Baseball. The tournament is held in Livermore, California.

The intermediate division is the second of four Little League divisions by development. The pitching mound is 50 feet from home plate, and the base paths are 70 feet apart. This allows for a transition between the smaller field dimensions of Little League (46/60), and the standard field dimensions of the advanced leagues (60.5/90).

== Tournament format ==
Unlike the Little League World Series — which has twenty regions (ten in the U.S. and ten international) — the Intermediate League World Series has eleven regions, plus a host team. The regional champions are divided into Pool A (U.S.) and Pool B (International). The teams advance to the semi-finals via a modified double elimination format; the semifinal and final are single elimination. Teams that lose their first two games face off in classification games.

Pool A (U.S.) consists of five regions + the host team

- Central
- East
- Host
- Southeast
- Southwest
- West

Pool B (International) consists of six regions

- Asia–Pacific
- Australia
- Canada
- Europe–Africa
- Latin America
- Mexico / Puerto Rico

== Champions ==
Year	Winner	Region	Score	Runner–Up	Region
2013	Osaka, Japan	Asia-Pacific	10–1	Collier Township, Pennsylvania	East
2014	Nogales, Arizona	West	11–4	San Lorenzo, Puerto Rico	Puerto Rico
2015	Seoul, South Korea	Asia-Pacific	10–5	Wellington, Florida	Southeast
2016	Wailuku, Hawaii	West	5–1	Seoul, South Korea	Asia-Pacific
2017	Guayama, Puerto Rico	Puerto Rico	6–5	Freehold Township, New Jersey	East
2018	Seoul, South Korea	Asia-Pacific	10–0	Livermore, California	Host
2019	McCalla, Alabama	Southeast	9–5	Matamoros, Mexico	Mexico
2020	Cancelled due to COVID-19 pandemic				
2021	Cancelled due to COVID-19 pandemic				
2022	Danville, California	Host	5–2	Seoul, South Korea	Asia-Pacific
2023	Seoul, South Korea	Asia-Pacific	11–4	Tampa, Florida	Southeast
2024	Kenner, Louisiana	Southwest	8–7	Seoul, South Korea	Asia-Pacific
2025	Valencia, Venezuela	Latin America	12–7	Wailuku, Hawaii	West
2026	Seoul, South Korea	Asia-Pacific	11–4	Livermore, California	West
Year	Winner	Region	Score	Runner–Up	Region

=== Championships won by Country/State ===
Team	Championships	Last
South Korea	4	2026
Japan	1	2013
Arizona	1	2014
Hawaii	1	2016
Puerto Rico	1	2017
Alabama	1	2019
(California) Host Team	1	2022
Louisiana	1	2024
Venezuela	1	2025

== See also ==
- List of Little League World Series champions by division
