= Carl Stotz =

Founder of Little League Baseball (1910–1992)

Carl E. Stotz
- Born: Carl Edwin Stotz; February 20, 1910; Williamsport, Pennsylvania, U.S.
- Died: June 4, 1992 (aged 82); Williamsport, Pennsylvania, U.S.
- Known for: Founder of Little League Baseball

Carl E. Stotz (February 20, 1910 – June 4, 1992) was the American founder of Little League Baseball.

== Early life ==
Stotz was born in Williamsport, Pennsylvania. He was the fourth of five children of Lulu Fisk Stotz and the third child of German immigrant (1862) Kristjian Stotz. He married first generation German-American Juliana Eddinger, in 1877 in Williamsport.

== Career ==
In the summer of 1938 at a location next to West 4th Street (at that time Carl could not get permission from the City of Williamsport to start league play at this location), Stotz started to discuss his dream with local children from the neighborhood. He was always set on adult supervision to stop bickering on the sandlot. Finally during the next year in the summer of 1939, he officially started up the first local league. The bases were placed 60 ft apart and the pitcher's mound was placed 40 ft from home plate. The initial 1939 games were played at Park Point, facing the Susquehanna River

A field further north at Memorial and Demarest Streets in Williamsport housed the 1940 and 1941 summer seasons during World War II (1939/1941-1945). During its fourth season in 1942, "Original League" returned to the first August 1938 area where Carl Stotz, his nephews (Major and Jimmy Gehron) and other boys experimented to determine the league's playing field measurements / dimensions and rules. The nephews mother, Laura Belle Stotz Gehron, sewed the initial bases. Carl hand-carved with a penknife the first home plate and pitchers mound.

The next step was for him to apply to local businesses for sponsorship and donations. He also looked to parents for help with the organization of the league. A year later in the summer of 1939 they had three teams set up. Each team was managed individually by Stotz (Lycoming Dairy) and brothers George (Lundy Lumber) and Bert Bebble (Jumbo Pretzel). The first game was played on June 6, 1939, with Lundy Lumber Company defeating Lycoming Dairy 23–8. The first annual tournament of the Little League World Series wasn't played until almost a decade later in the summer of 1948 though.

"Original League" on West Fourth Street is currently an unfranchised (from L.L.B. Inc.) and active league which hosted the first Little League Tournament (National Tournament) in 1947. The "Original League" Field was the venue for the 1948 through 1958 Little League World Series tournament games. Its clubhouse holds an Open House every day during the Little League World Series usually scheduled in August. The Little League Women's Auxiliary was organized in 1947 by Grayce Stotz, Carl's wife and a great "Original League" supporter.

Stotz was commissioner of the Little League for 18 years. from the beginnings in 1938 until 1955. He left the organization he founded of Little League Baseball Inc. in late November 1955 over differences centered on commercialization and central control issues with the management of what is locally abbreviated as L.L.B. Inc.

From that point on Carl continued an active relationship with the "Original League" until his death.

== Personal life ==
Stotz died in 1992 from a heart attack at the age of 82.

== Legacy ==
He is memorialized in Williamsport at the following places: Carl E. Stotz Memorial Little League Bridge; "Original League's" field (a 1995 Pennsylvania state historical site added in 2014 as a National Historical Site) in Williamsport, Pennsylvania; Carl E. Stotz Park (with a statue donated by the order of Masons organization placed at Volunteer Stadium of L.L.B. Inc. in adjacent South Williamsport; and a statue of three young Little League baseball players located on Memorial Avenue and Park Point.
