= 2018 Intermediate League World Series =

Tournament information
- Location: Livermore, California
- Dates: July 29–August 5

Final positions
- Champions: Seoul, South Korea
- Runner-up: Livermore, California

The 2018 Intermediate League World Series took place from July 29–August 5 in Livermore, California. Seoul, South Korea defeated host Livermore, California in the championship game.

The debut of the Australia Region raised the total number of teams to 12.

== Teams ==
United States	International
(California) Livermore, California; District 57 (Livermore/Granada); Host	(South Korea) Seoul, South Korea; West Seoul; Asia–Pacific
(Iowa) Ankeny, Iowa; Ankeny National; Central	(Western Australia) Perth, Western Australia; Perth Metro North; Australia
(New York (state)) Commack, New York; Commack North; East	(British Columbia) Coquitlam/Surrey, British Columbia; Coquitlam/Whalley; Canada
(Florida) Boynton Beach, Florida; West Boynton Beach; Southeast	Brno, Czech Republic; South Czech Republic; Europe–Africa
(Texas) Midland, West Texas; Mid-City; Southwest	(Mexico) Reynosa, Mexico; Guadalupe Treviño Kelly; Latin America
(California) San Diego, Southern California; Scripps Ranch; West	Guayama, Puerto Rico; Radames Lopez; Puerto Rico

== Results ==
United States Bracket

Upper round 1
—	California	7
—	Iowa	0
—	Texas	4
—	(California) Host	0
Lower round 1
0–1	Iowa	9
0–1	(New York (state)) New York	3
1–1	California	2
0–1	(California) Host	7

Upper round 2
—	Florida	5
1–0	California	1
—	(New York (state)) New York	0
1–0	Texas (F/5)	19
Lower round 2
1–1	Iowa	5
1–1	(California) Host	11

Upper final
1–0	Florida (F/8)	10
2–0	Texas	9
Lower final
2–1	Texas	5
2–1	(California) Host	13

United States Championship
2–0	Florida	1
3–1	(California) Host	5

International Bracket

Upper round 1
—	Czech Republic	1
—	Mexico	8
—	South Korea (F/4)	19
—	Australia	0
Lower round 1
0–1	Czech Republic	4
0–1	Canada	5
0–1	Puerto Rico (F/5)	11
0–1	Australia	0

Upper round 2
—	Puerto Rico	1
1–0	Mexico	2
—	Canada	0
1–0	South Korea (F/4)	23
Lower round 2
1–1	Canada	1
1–1	Puerto Rico	8

Upper final
2–0	Mexico	2
2–0	South Korea (F/5)	13
Lower final
2–1	Mexico	1
2–1	Puerto Rico (F/8)	2

International Championship
3–0	South Korea (F/5)	14
3–1	Puerto Rico	3

Consolation Round

—
0–2	(New York (state)) New York (F/5)	12
0–2	Australia	1

—
1–2	California (F/5)	13
0–2	Czech Republic	2

Elimination Round

Semifinals
2–0	Florida	1
3–1	(California) Host	5
3–0	South Korea (F/5)	14
3–1	Puerto Rico	3

World Championship
4–1	(California) Host	0
4–0	South Korea	10

2018 Intermediate League World Series Champions
West Seoul LL
Seoul, South Korea
