= 1982 in baseball =

The following are the baseball events of the year 1982 throughout the world.

== Champions ==
=== Major League Baseball ===
- World Series: St. Louis Cardinals over Milwaukee Brewers (4–3)

League Championship Series (ALCS, NLCS)
East	Milwaukee	3
West	California	2
East	St. Louis	3
West	Atlanta	0

World Series
AL	Milwaukee	3
NL	St. Louis	4

- World Series MVP: Darrell Porter
  - American League Championship Series MVP: Fred Lynn
  - National League Championship Series MVP: Darrell Porter
- All-Star Game, July 13 at Olympic Stadium: National League, 4–1; Dave Concepción, MVP

=== Other champions ===
- Amateur World Series: South Korea
- Caribbean World Series: Leones del Caracas (Venezuela)
- College World Series: Miami (Florida)
- Cuban National Series: Vegueros
- Japan Series: Seibu Lions over Chunichi Dragons (4–3)
- Korean Series: OB Bears over Samsung Lions
- Big League World Series: Puerto Rico
- Junior League World Series: Tampa, Florida
- Little League World Series: Kirkland National, Kirkland, Washington
- Senior League World Series: Santa Barbara, California

== Awards and honors ==
- Baseball Hall of Fame
  - Hank Aaron
  - Travis Jackson
  - Frank Robinson
  - Happy Chandler (executive)

Baseball Writers' Association of America Awards
BBWAA Award	National League	American League
Rookie of the Year	Steve Sax (LAD)	Cal Ripken Jr. (BAL)
Cy Young Award	Steve Carlton (PHI)	Pete Vuckovich (MIL)
Most Valuable Player	Dale Murphy (ATL)	Robin Yount (MIL)
Babe Ruth Award (World Series MVP)	Bruce Sutter (STL)	—
Gold Glove Awards
Position	National League	American League
Pitcher	Phil Niekro (ATL)	Ron Guidry (NYY)
Catcher	Gary Carter (MON)	Bob Boone (CAL)
First Baseman	Keith Hernandez (STL)	Eddie Murray (BAL)
Second Baseman	Manny Trillo (PHI)	Frank White (KC)
Third Baseman	Mike Schmidt (PHI)	Buddy Bell (TEX)
Shortstop	Ozzie Smith (STL)	Robin Yount (MIL)
Outfielders	Andre Dawson (MON)	Dwight Evans (BOS)
Outfielders	Garry Maddox (PHI)	Dwayne Murphy (OAK)
Outfielders	Dale Murphy (ATL)	Dave Winfield (NYY)

- Woman Executive of the Year (major or minor league)
  - Linda Pereria, San Jose Missions, California League

== Statistical leaders ==
	American League		National League	
Stat	Player	Total	Player	Total
AVG	Willie Wilson (KC)	.332	Al Oliver (MON)	.331
HR	Reggie Jackson (CAL); Gorman Thomas (MIL)	39	Dave Kingman (NYM)	37
RBI	Hal McRae (KC)	133	Dale Murphy (ATL); Al Oliver (MON)	109
W	LaMarr Hoyt (CWS)	19	Steve Carlton (PHI)	23
ERA	Rick Sutcliffe (CLE)	2.96	Steve Rogers (MON)	2.40
K	Floyd Bannister (SEA)	209	Steve Carlton (PHI)	286

== Major league baseball final standings ==
=== American League final standings ===
AL East
Team	W	L	Pct.	GB	Home	Road
^{(1)} Milwaukee Brewers	95	67	.586	—	48‍–‍34	47‍–‍33
Baltimore Orioles	94	68	.580	1	53‍–‍28	41‍–‍40
Boston Red Sox	89	73	.549	6	49‍–‍32	40‍–‍41
Detroit Tigers	83	79	.512	12	47‍–‍34	36‍–‍45
New York Yankees	79	83	.488	16	42‍–‍39	37‍–‍44
Cleveland Indians	78	84	.481	17	41‍–‍40	37‍–‍44
Toronto Blue Jays	78	84	.481	17	44‍–‍37	34‍–‍47

AL West
Team	W	L	Pct.	GB	Home	Road
^{(2)} California Angels	93	69	.574	—	52‍–‍29	41‍–‍40
Kansas City Royals	90	72	.556	3	56‍–‍25	34‍–‍47
Chicago White Sox	87	75	.537	6	49‍–‍31	38‍–‍44
Seattle Mariners	76	86	.469	17	42‍–‍39	34‍–‍47
Oakland Athletics	68	94	.420	25	36‍–‍45	32‍–‍49
Texas Rangers	64	98	.395	29	38‍–‍43	26‍–‍55
Minnesota Twins	60	102	.370	33	37‍–‍44	23‍–‍58

Locations of teams for the 1982–1988 American League seasons
West East

=== National League final standings ===
NL East
Team	W	L	Pct.	GB	Home	Road
^{(1)} St. Louis Cardinals	92	70	.568	—	46‍–‍35	46‍–‍35
Philadelphia Phillies	89	73	.549	3	51‍–‍30	38‍–‍43
Montreal Expos	86	76	.531	6	40‍–‍41	46‍–‍35
Pittsburgh Pirates	84	78	.519	8	42‍–‍39	42‍–‍39
Chicago Cubs	73	89	.451	19	38‍–‍43	35‍–‍46
New York Mets	65	97	.401	27	33‍–‍48	32‍–‍49

NL West
Team	W	L	Pct.	GB	Home	Road
^{(2)} Atlanta Braves	89	73	.549	—	42‍–‍39	47‍–‍34
Los Angeles Dodgers	88	74	.543	1	43‍–‍38	45‍–‍36
San Francisco Giants	87	75	.537	2	45‍–‍36	42‍–‍39
San Diego Padres	81	81	.500	8	43‍–‍38	38‍–‍43
Houston Astros	77	85	.475	12	43‍–‍38	34‍–‍47
Cincinnati Reds	61	101	.377	28	33‍–‍48	28‍–‍53

Locations of teams for the 1977–1992 National League seasons
West East

== Nippon Professional Baseball final standings ==
=== Central League final standings ===
Central League
Team	G	W	L	T	Pct.	GB
Chunichi Dragons	130	64	47	19	.577	–
Yomiuri Giants	130	66	50	14	.569	0.5
Hanshin Tigers	130	65	57	8	.533	4.5
Hiroshima Toyo Carp	130	59	58	13	.504	8.0
Yokohama Taiyo Whales	130	53	65	12	.449	14.5
Yakult Swallows	130	45	75	10	.375	23.5

=== Pacific League final standings ===
Pacific League
Team	G	W	L	T	Pct.	1st half ranking	2nd half ranking
Seibu Lions	130	68	58	4	.540	1	3
Nippon-Ham Fighters	130	67	52	11	.563	4	1
Kintetsu Buffaloes	130	63	57	10	.525	3	2
Hankyu Braves	130	62	60	8	.508	2	5
Lotte Orions	130	54	69	7	.439	6	4
Nankai Hawks	130	53	71	6	.427	5	6

== Events ==
=== January ===
- January 6 – The Texas Rangers sign starting pitcher Frank Tanana, granted free agency from the Boston Red Sox on November 13, 1981.
- January 8 – The New York Mets obtain shortstop Tom Veryzer from the Cleveland Indians for pitcher Ray Searage.
- January 9 – Tony Conigliaro, whose auspicious career was forever derailed in 1967 at age 22 when he was hit in the face by a pitch, suffers a massive heart attack while being driven to Boston's airport. The heart attack leaves Conigliaro, now 37, in an unresponsive state, in which he'll remain until his death in 1990.
- January 12 – The Minnesota Twins select outfielder Kirby Puckett out of Bradley University with their first pick, third overall, in the January edition of the 1980 amateur draft. Future ten-time All-Star Puckett will win two World Series rings and be elected to the Baseball Hall of Fame in 2001.

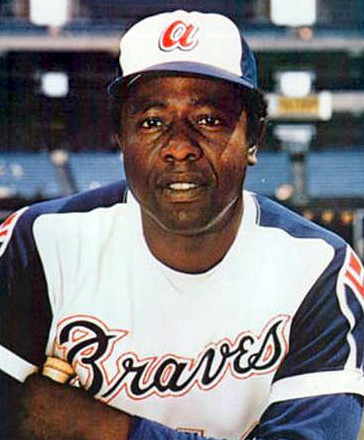
Hank Aaron in 1974

- January 13 – Hank Aaron and Frank Robinson become the 12th and 13th players elected to the Hall of Fame by the Baseball Writers' Association of America in their first year of eligibility. Aaron falls nine votes shy of becoming the first unanimous selection, and his 97.8% share of the vote is second only to Ty Cobb's 98.2% in the inaugural 1936 election.
- January 15 – The Texas Rangers sign designated hitter/first baseman Lamar Johnson, granted free agency from the Chicago White Sox the previous November.
- January 20 – The Philadelphia Phillies re-sign relief pitcher Ron Reed. The 39-year-old veteran of 16 MLB seasons, a Phillie since 1976, is a key member of their bullpen. He was among those granted free agency November 13.
- January 22 – Reggie Jackson, 35, signs with the California Angels after being granted free agency from the New York Yankees on November 13. His five-year stay in the Bronx yields four AL East titles, three American League pennants, and two World Series (1977, 1978) championships; in that half-decade, Jackson contributes 144 regular-season home runs, plus eight in the Fall Classic and four in the ALCS.
- January 25 – The Phillies re-sign another longtime pitcher, starter Larry Christenson. The right-hander, 28, who's won 72 games in a Philadelphia uniform since his debut in April 1973, had been granted free agency the previous November.
- January 27 – The Chicago Cubs complete a trade with the Philadelphia Phillies in which the Cubs obtain veteran shortstop Larry Bowa, a five-time National League All-Star, and 22-year-old second base prospect Ryne Sandberg from Philadelphia for shortstop Iván DeJesús. The coup, engineered by the Cubs' new general manager, Dallas Green, formerly the Phillies' field manager, nets a future Hall of Famer in Sandberg, whose 15 years in Chicago will see him selected 1984's NL MVP, named to ten All-Star teams, and win ten Gold Glove Awards and seven Silver Slugger Awards.
- January 28 – The Baltimore Orioles deal veteran third baseman Doug DeCinces and southpaw Jeff Schneider to the California Angels for outfielder Dan Ford. DeCinces, 31, will bash 30 homers for the Angels and finish third in AL MVP Award balloting in 1982.

=== February ===
- February 2 – The first-ever "Type A" free-agent compensation draft, implemented by the CBA following the 1981 Major League Baseball strike, results in one transaction: the Chicago White Sox select 20-year-old catcher prospect Joel Skinner as compensation for losing free-agent hurler Ed Farmer to the Philadelphia Phillies. Skinner, however, is not selected from the Phillies, but from the Pittsburgh Pirates, who had placed him in a multi-team pool of available players.
- February 8 – The Los Angeles Dodgers trade away Davey Lopes to the Oakland Athletics, breaking up the starting infield of Lopes (second base), Ron Cey (third base), Bill Russell (shortstop), and Steve Garvey (first base), which had been together since 1974—the longest continuously intact infield in Major League Baseball history. Lopes, though 36, has six productive MLB seasons ahead of him. Los Angeles receives minor-league infielder Lance Hudson, a 19-year-old prospect drafted by Oakland in the fourth round of 1981's January amateur draft, in return.
- February 10 – The New York Mets acquire premier power-hitter George Foster from the Cincinnati Reds for three players: pitchers Greg Harris and Jim Kern and catcher Alex Treviño. Foster, 33, is a five-time National League All-Star, the 1977 NL MVP, and author of 221 home runs since he became a regular outfielder for the Reds in 1975. He is the only player to crack 50 or more home runs (52 in 1977) since Willie Mays in 1965. But he's been embroiled in a contract dispute with Cincinnati's front office all winter. On February 11, the Mets will sign Foster to a five-year pact worth at least $10 million.
- February 13 – The Cleveland Indians re-sign veteran right-hander John Denny, 29, who went 10–6 (3.15) in 19 starts for them in 1981. Denny had been among November 13's free agent class.
- February 16 – The Indians acquire veteran outfielder Bake McBride from the Philadelphia Phillies for southpaw pitcher Sid Monge.
- February 19 – Right-hander Dick Tidrow rejoins the Chicago Cubs. He had been granted free agency from them in November 1981.
- February 25 – The Boston Red Sox sign former All-Star and rookie phenom Mark Fidrych, released by the Detroit Tigers last October 5. The Massachusetts native, now 27, will appear in 32 games for Triple-A Pawtucket in 1982–1983, but he cannot overcome his sore arm and regain his effectiveness.
- February 27 – The San Francisco Giants sign seven-time All-Star outfielder Reggie Smith, granted free agency from the Los Angeles Dodgers last November 13.

=== March ===
- March 4 – The San Francisco Giants trade infielder Enos Cabell and cash to the Detroit Tigers for outfielder and pinch hitter Champ Summers.
- March 5:
  - The Seattle Mariners sign future Hall-of-Fame pitcher Gaylord Perry, 43, released by the Atlanta Braves last October 5. Seattle is Perry's eighth MLB address during his 22-year career to date. He's three wins short of the 300-victory mark. "At this point, I can't be too choosy," he says after signing with the still-struggling, six-year-old expansion team.
  - The Mariners also obtain outfielder Thad Bosley from the Milwaukee Brewers for pitcher Mike Parrott.
- March 6 – The San Diego Padres sign starting pitcher John Montefusco, granted free agency from the Atlanta Braves last November 13.

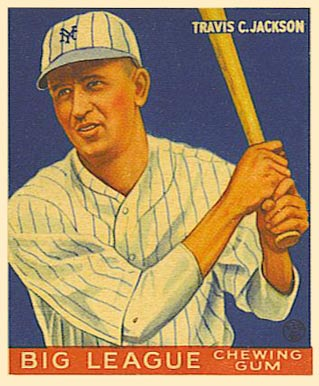
Travis Jackson

- March 10 – Former New York Giants shortstop Travis Jackson and former Commissioner of Baseball Happy Chandler are elected to the Hall of Fame by the Special Veterans Committee. Jackson hit .291 in 15 seasons between the 1920s and 1930s, while Chandler was the second commissioner and oversaw – and encouraged—the dismantling of the color barrier in 1947.
- March 21 – The Chicago White Sox deal pitchers Ross Baumgarten and Butch Edge to the Pittsburgh Pirates for pitcher Ernie Camacho and shortstop/third baseman Vance Law.
- March 24 – The Kansas City Royals obtain two players in two transactions: infielder Greg Pryor from the White Sox for pitcher Jeff Schattinger, and first baseman Dennis Werth from the New York Yankees for 20-year old minor-league hurler Scot Beahan.
- March 25 – The Toronto Blue Jays acquire lefty-swinging third baseman Rance Mulliniks from the Royals for right-handed pitcher Phil Huffman. Mulliniks, 26, will play all or parts of 11 seasons in a Toronto uniform, and bat over .300 three times. The Jays also sign another left-handed bat, designated hitter Glenn Adams, 34, granted free agency from the Minnesota Twins last November 13.
- March 26:
  - The Chicago Cubs acquire second baseman Bump Wills from the Texas Rangers for pitcher Paul Mirabella, a player to be named later (PTBNL), and cash. Wills, 29, is the son of the Dodgers' star shortstop of the 1960s and a former Rangers' first-round draft pick. The Rangers receive minor-league hurler Paul Semall on April 21 to complete the deal.
  - The Cincinnati Reds trade Joe Nolan, their most-used catcher in 1981, to the Baltimore Orioles for outfielder Dallas Williams and minor-league hurler Brooks Carey.
- March 27 – The first game is played in the history of the KBO League, the major professional baseball league of South Korea.
- March 30:
  - The Kansas City Royals acquire veteran left-hander Vida Blue from the San Francisco Giants in a six-player transaction. Blue, 32, who was 1971's American League Cy Young and MVP Award-winner, is still an effective hurler. He's made six All-Star teams—three in each league. The Royals obtain Blue and fellow southpaw Bob Tufts from the Giants for pitchers Craig Chamberlain, Atlee Hammaker and Renie Martin, and infielder Brad Wellman.
  - The New York Yankees trade pitcher Andy McGaffigan and outfielder Ted Wilborn to the Giants for veteran right-hander Doyle Alexander. The well-traveled Alexander will struggle in his second stint as a Yankee, losing nine of ten decisions with a poor 6.16 earned run average in 24 games before drawing his release May 31, 1983. He will return to effectiveness with the Toronto Blue Jays after they sign him on June 21, 1983.
  - The Los Angeles Dodgers trade center-fielder Rudy Law to the Chicago White Sox for outfield prospect and former first-round draft choice Cecil Espy, 19, and minor-league hurler Bart Geiger.
- March 31 – The Montreal Expos trade third baseman Larry Parrish and first baseman Dave Hostetler to the Texas Rangers for first baseman Al Oliver.

=== April ===
- April 1:
  - The New York Mets trade outfielder Lee Mazzilli to the Texas Rangers for pitchers Ron Darling and Walt Terrell. Darling will win 99 regular-season games and go 1–1 (1.53) in three starts to help win the 1986 World Series during his nine years in a Met uniform.
  - The Seattle Mariners deal southpaw Shane Rawley to the New York Yankees for right-handers Bill Caudill and Gene Nelson and outfielder Bobby Brown ("PTBNL").
  - The St. Louis Cardinals acquire rookie relief pitcher Jeff Lahti from the Cincinnati Reds, along with minor-league hurler Oscar Brito, for pitcher Bob Shirley.
- April 2:
  - The San Francisco Giants release infielder Rennie Stennett. Signed as a marquee free agent following the 1979 season, Stennett, 32, has never regained his form after a serious ankle injury sustained in August 1977 while he was a Pittsburgh Pirate. He is released with almost $2 million remaining on his San Francisco contract.
  - The Chicago White Sox obtain third baseman Aurelio Rodríguez from the Toronto Blue Jays for outfielder/DH Wayne Nordhagen. Rodríguez played nine seasons (1971–1979) as a Detroit Tigers' stalwart, but the White Sox will be his fourth team since the Tigers traded him in December 1979.
- April 5 – The MLB season commences with a game in each league. In the National League's traditional opener at Cincinnati, the Reds fall to the Chicago Cubs 3–2, as newcomers Bump Wills and Keith Moreland homer in their first at bats in Chicago uniforms. At Memorial Stadium, the Baltimore Orioles belt four home runs, including the first of rookie Cal Ripken Jr.'s MLB career, to defeat the Kansas City Royals 13–5 in the American League's opening day.
- April 6:
  - In Minneapolis, the Hubert H. Humphrey Metrodome celebrates its MLB debut, as the Seattle Mariners out-slug the Minnesota Twins 11–7. Minnesota's Dave Engle christens the Dome with its first home run; third baseman Gary Gaetti, who earlier was thrown out trying to stretch a triple into an inside-the-park home run, adds two over-the-fence homers, entertaining the 52,279 in attendance. Muriel Humphrey, widow of the 38th Vice President of the United States, throws out the first pitch.
  - A blizzard unprecedented in size for April dumps 1–2 feet (30.5–61.0 cm) of snow on the northeastern United States, closing schools and businesses, snarling traffic, and canceling six season-opening MLB games.
  - The Houston Astros claim relief pitcher Mike LaCoss on waivers from the Cincinnati Reds.
  - The California Angels release shortstop Freddie Patek, a 14-year MLB veteran and three-time AL All-Star.
- April 7 – The Oakland Athletics sign outfielder/DH Jeff Burroughs, granted free agency from the Seattle Mariners last November 13.
- April 8 – In a lengthy early-season contest, the Athletics and California Angels go 16 innings at Oakland–Alameda County Coliseum before the Angels claim an 8–6 victory. Tied at four after 15, the visitors score four runs in the top half of the 16th, then withstand a two-run rally by the Athletics in the bottom of the frame. Three days later, Oakland fans will witness another 16-inning defeat, when the Seattle Mariners score three times in the visitors' half to down the Athletics, 6–3.
- April 9:
  - The Boston Red Sox trade 6 ft 8 in (2.03 m) rookie right-hander Mike Smithson to the Texas Rangers for left-hander John Henry Johnson.
  - Two veteran players granted free agency on November 13, 1981, return to their previous teams: outfielder Héctor Cruz rejoins the Chicago Cubs, and southpaw Dave LaRoche re-signs with the New York Yankees.
  - The Cubs also sign right-handed reliever Mike Proly, released by the Philadelphia Phillies on March 29.

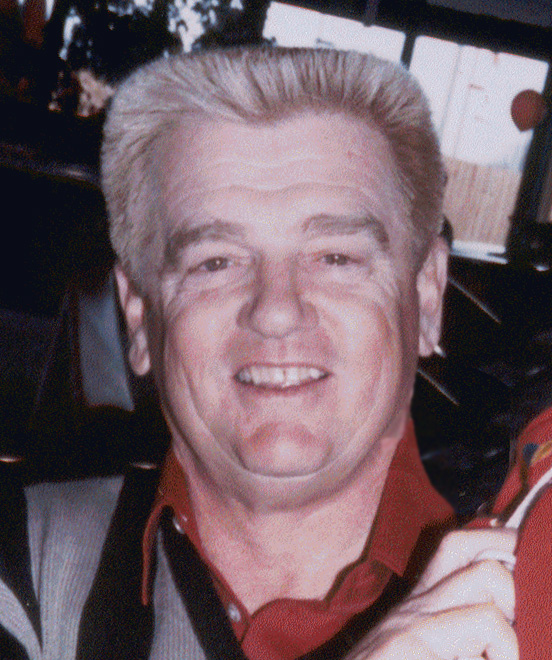
Whitey Herzog

- April 10:
  - Whitey Herzog, who's held the dual posts of general manager (GM) and field manager of the St. Louis Cardinals since October 1980, voluntarily relinquishes his front-office responsibilities to assistant GM Joe McDonald, a longtime associate with whom he worked with the New York Mets from 1967 through 1972. Herzog, who has radically altered the Cardinals' playing roster since becoming GM, remains the team's on-field pilot and receives a $75,000 raise in salary.
  - The Minnesota Twins trade former All-Star shortstop Roy Smalley III to the New York Yankees for pitchers Ron Davis and Paul Boris and shortstop prospect Greg Gagne. Smalley, 29, will man the Yanks' shortstop post for the next two seasons; Gagne, 20, will play the key midfield position for two (1987, 1991) World Series-champion Twins teams.
  - After six years in the minor leagues, Wade Boggs, 23, makes his Boston Red Sox debut. Playing first base, Boggs goes hitless in a 5–3 loss to the Baltimore Orioles.
- April 13:
  - It's opening day at Shea Stadium as the New York Mets, behind Randy Jones, beat Steve Carlton and the Philadelphia Phillies 5–2 before 40,845 fans, the stadium's highest inaugural-game crowd since 1970. Dave Kingman goes 2-for-3, including his second home run of the season.
  - Another marathon contest in the AL West sees the visiting Seattle Mariners and California Angels take 20 innings and two nights to settle matters. Tonight the teams battle for 17 frames to a 3–3 deadlock before a curfew suspends the game at 1:07 a.m. Then, when the game resumes tomorrow, they take almost three more innings before Bob Boone's single knocks in the winning run in a 4–3 Angel triumph. Luis Sánchez goes 41/3 shutout innings over two nights to gain the victory.
- April 19 – Led by Terry Kennedy's four safeties, the San Diego Padres rake 24 base hits off three San Francisco Giants hurlers in their 13–6 triumph at Jack Murphy Stadium. The two-dozen hits will be the most in a game by any big-league club in 1982.
- April 20:
  - Before 37,268 fans—which will be the largest throng to see a game at Atlanta–Fulton County Stadium this season—the Atlanta Braves beat the Cincinnati Reds 4–2, to go 12–0, the best start by an MLB team in the modern era. Steve Bedrosian is the winning pitcher. The streak will reach 13 the next day when the Braves edge the Reds 4–3.
  - At Comiskey Park, the Chicago White Sox' eight-game, season-opening winning streak ends when the New York Yankees tag them with their first loss of the season, an 11–2 thrashing. The Yankees score all their runs in the seventh, eighth and ninth innings.
  - Playing their third 16-inning game in 12 days, the Oakland Athletics finally break through when Dan Meyer knocks home Davey Lopes with the winning run in a 4–3 victory over the visiting Minnesota Twins. Oakland had dropped 16-inning contests on April 8 and 11.
- April 21 – In his 6–0 complete-game shutout, southpaw Jerry Reuss of the Los Angeles Dodgers one-hits the visiting Houston Astros, with Art Howe collecting Houston's lone safety in the contest's first inning. It's the first of Reuss's two one-hitters in 1982 (the other comes June 11 against the Cincinnati Reds). The season will not witness a single no-hitter.
- April 23 – The New York Yankees deal veteran first baseman Bob Watson to the Atlanta Braves for minor-league pitcher Scott Patterson. Watson, 36, will return to the Bombers as their general manager in 1995.
- April 25 – Hall-of-Fame former pitcher Bob Lemon's second term as manager of the defending AL champion Yankees ends abruptly when owner George Steinbrenner replaces him with Gene Michael—Lemon's predecessor as the Bombers' dugout boss. The 1982 Yankees are 6–8 and en route to their first losing season since 1973. They're in the midst of a 14-year stretch (1978–1991) in which they will change managers 15 times, and Michael's second term won't last to the end of the 1982 campaign.
- April 28 – Eddie Milner's fourth-inning single is the only safety that Dickie Noles of the Chicago Cubs allows in his one-hit 6–0 victory over the Cincinnati Reds at Wrigley Field.

=== May ===
- May 4 – Heckling from fans in Fenway Park's bleachers drives standout Minnesota Twins rookie centerfielder Jim Eisenreich out of a game against the Boston Red Sox after two innings. Eisenreich, 23, is batting .310 with two home runs in 24 games, while battling hyperventilation and involuntary muscle twitches that have caused early exits in each of his previous four games. Today, his condition worsens as the verbal abuse continues. After a stint on the injured list, Eisenreich will appear in only 14 games for the Twins before his voluntary retirement on June 4, 1984. Diagnosed with Tourette syndrome, he'll make a comeback in the minor leagues in 1987, then return to the majors to play almost 1,400 more games, including star turns with the Kansas City Royals (1987–1992; .277 in 650 games) and Philadelphia Phillies (1993–1996; .324 in 499 games).
- May 5 – The Toronto Blue Jays trade first baseman John Mayberry to the New York Yankees for first baseman Dave Revering and third basemen Tom Dodd and Jeff Reynolds. Mayberry, 33, a two-time AL All-Star, is in his 15th and final MLB season.

Gaylord Perry in 1977

- May 6 – At the Kingdome, Gaylord Perry of the Seattle Mariners becomes the 15th pitcher with 300 career wins, throwing a complete-game, nine-hit 7–3 victory over the New York Yankees before 27,369 fans. When he retires in September 1983, he'll have 314 wins to his credit, and be elected to the Baseball Hall of Fame in 1991.
- May 9:
  - The New York Mets' Rusty Staub hits a game winning home run off Greg Minton of the San Francisco Giants. The home run ends Minton's streak of 254 1/3 innings without allowing a long ball. This still stands as the longest streak in the live-ball era, if not ever.
  - Angry at the release of second baseman Rodney Scott, left-hander Bill "Spaceman" Lee spends the first six innings of the Montreal Expos' 5–4 loss to the Los Angeles Dodgers shooting pool and drinking beer at a local tavern. He returns to Olympic Stadium in the seventh and, after the game, leaves his uniform in manager Jim Fanning's office. Shortly thereafter, Lee is released.
- May 12:
  - In the second major transaction between them in 32 days, the 11–23 Minnesota Twins trade two-time All-Star catcher Butch Wynegar and starting pitcher Roger Erickson to the 13–16 New York Yankees for pitchers Pete Filson and John Pacella, infielder Larry Milbourne and cash.
  - The California Angels acquire relief pitcher Doug Corbett and second baseman Rob Wilfong from the Twins for pitcher Mike Walters, outfielder Tom Brunansky and $400,000.
- May 13 – Allen Ripley and Lee Smith combine to defeat the Houston Astros 5–0 on the road, enabling the Chicago Cubs to become the first MLB franchise to win 8,000 games.
- May 18 – Detroit Tigers outfielder Larry Herndon blasts home runs in his first three plate appearances, all of them off Oakland Athletics starting pitcher Mike Norris, driving in seven runs in an 11–9 victory at Tiger Stadium.
- May 25 – In the third inning against the San Diego Padres, Ferguson Jenkins, playing for the Chicago Cubs, becomes the seventh pitcher to record 3,000 strikeouts. His victim is Garry Templeton of the Padres.
- May 30 – Cal Ripken Jr. starts at third base for the Baltimore Orioles against the Toronto Blue Jays. It is the first game of his record-breaking 2,632 consecutive games played streak. Coincidentally, tomorrow, May 31, will be the fifty-seventh anniversary of the start of Lou Gehrig's streak, which Ripken will break. In the game, Toronto's Jim Gott and Roy Lee Jackson combine for a one-hitter as the Blue Jays win, 6–0. Rick Dempsey's fifth inning single off Gott is Baltimore's lone safety.

=== June ===
- June 1:
  - The Milwaukee Brewers, expected to contend in the AL East but only 23–24 on the season and seven games out of first place, fire manager Buck Rodgers. His successor, batting coach Harvey Kuenn, will guide the Brewers to victory in 20 of their next 27 games, and Milwaukee will take over first place on July 11. Soon known as "Harvey's Wallbangers", the 1982 Brewers will go on to win the division title and their only American League pennant.
  - Rickey Henderson's two-run fifth-inning homer paces the Oakland Athletics to a 3–2 win over the Boston Red Sox. Henderson also steals his 51st base in 51 games.
- June 6 – While crossing a street in Arlington, Texas after umpiring a game between the Chicago White Sox and Texas Rangers, umpire Lou DiMuro is struck by a car; he dies early the next day. The American League later retires his umpire's uniform number 16.
- June 7 – The June 1982 MLB amateur draft sees shortstop Shawon Dunston selected first overall by the Chicago Cubs out of Brooklyn's Thomas Jefferson High School. The New York Mets select pitcher Doc Gooden with their first pick (fourth overall) from Tampa's Hillsborough High School. In the second round, three other elite high school prospects are drafted—but they pass up signing pro contracts to play college athletics: Barry Bonds (San Francisco Giants, #39 overall), Bo Jackson (New York Yankees, #50) and Barry Larkin (Cincinnati Reds, #51).
- June 8 – Bob Boone's two-run double keys a four-run fourth inning and Reggie Jackson slams a solo homer, as the California Angels snap a seven-game losing streak with a 11–4 win over the Toronto Blue Jays.
- June 9 – In the second game of a twi-night doubleheader, the Detroit Tigers and visiting Cleveland Indians battle for 3:38 to a 3–all tie through 14 full innings before a curfew halts proceedings. The game will resume September 24 with new umpires, and it will require four more innings before the Bengals win, 4–3, when former Tiger Ed Glynn's wild pitch scores Alan Trammell with the decisive run.
- June 15 – In a three-team, all-outfielder, interleague transaction, the Philadelphia Phillies acquire Wayne Nordhagen from the Toronto Blue Jays for Dick Davis, then ship Nordhagen to the Pittsburgh Pirates for veteran ex-Phillie Bill Robinson. Seven days later, in a bizarre postscript, the Pirates send Nordhagen back to Toronto for Davis. Robinson remains with Philadelphia.
- June 16 – At Memorial Stadium, the Milwaukee Brewers and Baltimore Orioles are deadlocked 2–2 through nine full innings when rain halts play. The game is ruled 1982's only tie (there were four in 1981) but all statistics will go into the record books.
- June 19 – Willie Randolph's RBI single in the bottom of the 16th inning seals a "walk off" 4–3 New York Yankees' victory over the Orioles in the marathon contest.
- June 20 – Pete Rose of the Philadelphia Phillies becomes only the fifth player in history to play in 3,000 MLB games.
- June 26 – Dave LaRoche fires six innings of shutout relief, enabling his New York Yankees to win their second extended extra innings game in a week, 4–3 over the visiting Cleveland Indians in 17 innings. LaRoche was the winning pitcher in each drawn-out contest.
- June 27 – Four Atlanta Braves pitchers—Rick Camp, Steve Bedrosian, Gene Garber and Al Hrabosky—combine for a 14-inning, eight-hit shutout victory over the Cincinnati Reds at Riverfront Stadium.
- June 30 – The Braves acquire right-handed pitcher Pascual Pérez and a minor-league infielder from the Pittsburgh Pirates for left-hander Larry McWilliams. Initially assigned to Triple-A Richmond, Pérez will be recalled in late July, then on August 19, he'll play an unusual role in the Braves' quest for the 1982 NL West division title.

=== July ===
- July 4 – There are races in every division at the unofficial half-way mark of MLB's regular season. In the AL West, the Kansas City Royals (44–32) lead the California Angels (45–34) by a half-game, with the Chicago White Sox (41–35) and surprising Seattle Mariners (42–37) three and 3½ games out, respectively. In the AL East, the Boston Red Sox (45–32) are a full game in front of the Milwaukee Brewers (44–33). In the NL East, the Philadelphia Phillies (44–34) hold edges of one game over the St. Louis Cardinals (44–36), three over the Montreal Expos (41-37), and 3½ lengths over the Pittsburgh Pirates. Meanwhile, in the NL West, the Atlanta Braves (48–29) enjoy a 4½-game lead over the second-place San Diego Padres (44–34).
- July 6 – At the Kingdome, the New York Yankees blow a seventh-inning, 7–0 lead when the Mariners rally to tie the score in the home half of the seventh. But Bobby Murcer's 12th-inning solo shot and Rudy May's shutdown relief effort enable the Bombers to prevail, 8–7. After today, New York is 38–38, in fifth place and six games behind the leaders in the AL East.
- July 7 – At Comiskey Park, future Hall of Famer Harold Baines of the Chicago White Sox slugs home runs in three consecutive at bats—solo blows in the fifth and seventh innings, and a grand slam in the eighth—and drives in six in the ChiSox' 7–0 win over the Detroit Tigers. It's his first of what will be Baines' three career three-homer games. Dennis Lamp fires the shutout.
- July 13 – At Montreal's Olympic Stadium, in the first All-Star Game held outside the United States, Cincinnati Reds shortstop Dave Concepción hits a two-run home run in the second inning to spark the National League to a 4–1 win over the American League. It's the NL's 11th straight victory and 19th in the last 20 contests. Concepción wins the MVP honors.
- July 15 – The Detroit Tigers come out of the All-Star break with their hitting shoes on, scoring 11 runs in the top of the first at the Hubert H. Humphrey Metrodome en route to an 18–2 rout of the Minnesota Twins. They rack up nine hits and a walk in the opening frame; Lance Parrish belts a two-run homer.

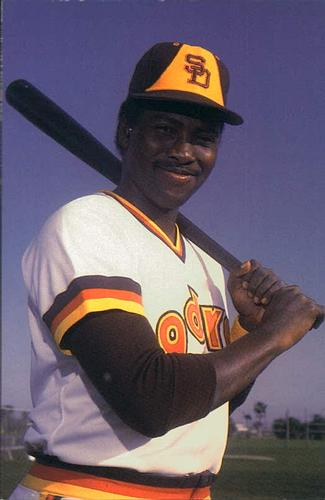
Tony Gwynn in 1983

- July 19 – Tony Gwynn of the San Diego Padres makes his Major League debut. His double and single will be the first two hits of the 3,141 he will accumulate in his Hall of Fame career.
- July 20 – The sudden, shocking decline of the Cincinnati Reds—who today are 34–58 (.370) and last in the NL West—costs fourth-year manager John McNamara his job. Coach Russ Nixon takes the helm. Cincinnati had compiled the best overall record (66–42, .611) in MLB during 1981's strike-disrupted season.
- July 28 – The Texas Rangers fire manager Don Zimmer and appoint coach Darrell Johnson acting pilot. The Rangers are 38–58, in sixth place and 16½ games out of first. Zimmer departs with a 95–106 (.473) record in 1+ seasons. Ironically, in July 1976, the scenario was reversed when the Boston Red Sox fired Johnson as skipper and named Zimmer, then a coach, to succeed him.
- July 29 – The Atlanta Braves were in first place in the National League West, 9 games ahead of the San Diego Padres when owner Ted Turner decides to remove the elevated tipi of mascot Chief Noc-A-Homa from the stands to allow more seats to be sold for the Braves' run at the division title. The Braves, however, lose 19 of their next 21 games, falling into third place before the tipi is restored.

=== August ===
- August 2 – Johnny Ray's two-run triple in the 17th inning enables the Pittsburgh Pirates to break a 2–2 deadlock and defeat the St. Louis Cardinals at Busch Memorial Stadium in one of the National League's longest games of 1982. Ray had gone 0-for-7 before striking the decisive blow.
- August 3:
  - Frank White hits for the cycle and knocks in four runs in today's 6–5 Kansas City Royals victory over the Detroit Tigers at Royals Stadium. White's ninth-inning triple both completes the only "cycle" to occur in the majors this season and drives home Onix Concepción with the Royals' winning run.
  - After the Chicago White Sox sweep a doubleheader from the New York Yankees in the Bronx, 1–0 and 14–2, owner George Steinbrenner fires manager Gene Michael for the second time in 11 months and names his third skipper of 1982: veteran baseball man Clyde King, earlier this season the Bombers' pitching coach and a special assistant to Steinbrenner. New York is 50–50 on the season, 44–42 under Michael.
- August 4 – Joel Youngblood of the New York Mets goes 1-for-2 off Ferguson Jenkins of the Chicago Cubs in a day game at Wrigley Field in Chicago. He is informed that he has been traded to the Montreal Expos, and leaves immediately for Philadelphia to meet the team there. He arrives in time to play, and enters the game in the sixth inning, getting a hit off Steve Carlton. He is the first player in Major League history to hit safely for two different teams on the same day.
- August 7 – In the fourth inning of a game at Fenway Park between the Boston Red Sox and the Chicago White Sox, four-year old Jonathan Keane is hit in the head with a foul line drive hit into the stands by Dave Stapleton. The hit causes Keane's skull to bleed profusely, and Jim Rice quickly enters the stands and carries Keane inside the dugout to the Red Sox trainer's room, where team doctors take over. Rice plays the remainder of the game with a blood-stained uniform. Keane, meanwhile, recovers at a nearby children's hospital and Rice and the team doctors are credited with saving his life. After visiting Keane, Rice stops by the hospital's business office and instructs that the family's bill should be sent to him to pay.
- August 8:
  - Rollie Fingers earns the 300th save of his career, becoming the first pitcher in history to achieve that mark. He saves a 3–2 win for the Milwaukee Brewers vs the Seattle Mariners in Seattle.
  - The New York Yankees deal 1978 hero and shortstop Bucky Dent to the Texas Rangers for outfielder and former New York Mets star Lee Mazzilli.
- August 9 – Bill Virdon, manager of the Houston Astros since August 19, 1975, is fired with his club 49–62 and fifth in its division. Coach Bob Lillis, shortstop for the original, 1962 "Colt .45s", takes the reins. Virdon is the most successful skipper in the franchise's 21-year history to date, leading the Astros to 544 regular-season victories and two postseason appearances.
- August 10:
  - The Atlanta Braves, who've led the NL West since winning their first 12 games of the 1982 season, tumble out of first place for the first time, losing to the San Francisco Giants 3–2 at Candlestick Park. The Giants' Milt May hits the game-winning home run off Al Hrabosky in the seventh inning; the loss is Atlanta's eighth consecutive and 12th in their last 13 games.
  - Meanwhile, the Los Angeles Dodgers, who had trailed the Braves by ten games less than two weeks earlier, defeat the Cincinnati Reds at Dodger Stadium 11–3 as Rick Monday and Steve Garvey both homer. The victory is the Dodgers' eighth consecutive and 12th in their last 13 games. Their comeback includes sweeping two four-game series from the Braves—one at Atlanta–Fulton County Stadium from July 30 to August 1, and another at Dodger Stadium (the first three coming in extra innings) from August 5–8, just prior to the Cincinnati series.
- August 17–18:
  - The visiting Dodgers and the Chicago Cubs lock horns at light-less Wrigley Field in a rhubarb-filled extra-innings marathon that's suspended because of darkness after 17 full innings on the 17th, then takes another four frames to decide on the 18th. Finally, in the visitors' 21st inning, Steve Sax scores on Dusty Baker's sacrifice fly to give Los Angeles the 2–1 victory. Three Dodgers and two Cubs are ejected—including both managers, Tommy Lasorda and Lee Elia. The contest lasts six hours and ten minutes.
  - The Dodgers' Jerry Reuss goes four innings in relief to win the suspended game, then starts August 18's regularly scheduled contest and picks up his second victory of the day when he allows two runs in five innings in Los Angeles' 7–4 victory. With the slumping Braves' 12–2 defeat at the hands of the Montreal Expos today in Atlanta, Los Angeles extends its divisional lead to four full games.
- August 19 – Atlanta Braves right-hander Pascual Pérez, recently recalled from Triple-A, misses his starting assignment when he gets lost on Atlanta's highways for three hours en route to the Fulton County Stadium. The Braves, mired in a 2–19 slump, win anyway, and when Pérez starts the next night and goes 92/3 strong innings in another Atlanta victory, his highway misadventure is hailed for "breaking the tension" in the team's clubhouse and setting them back on a winning course.
- August 23
  - The see-saw NL West race continues when the suddenly resurgent Atlanta Braves climb back into a first-place tie by beating the Philadelphia Phillies 4–3, while the Los Angeles Dodgers drop an 11–3 contest to the NL East-leading St. Louis Cardinals. The Braves have won five in a row, while the Dodgers have lost four out of five.
  - Even though he has made no secret that he occasionally employs the spitball, Gaylord Perry is ejected in the seventh inning of a game versus the Boston Red Sox for throwing the illegal pitch. American League umpire Dave Phillips hands Perry, 43, the first such ejection of his 22-year MLB career.
- August 27 – Rickey Henderson steals four bases, breaking the record he had shared with Lou Brock at 118 stolen bases for the season. He will steal eight more to end the season with a record of 130.
- August 30 – The Milwaukee Brewers, 4½ games ahead in the AL East, acquire future Hall-of-Fame right-hander Don Sutton, 37, from the Houston Astros for cash and three players to be named later. Sutton helps pitch the Brewers to the American League pennant, capturing four of five September decisions and starting and winning Game 3 of the 1982 ALCS.
- August 31 – Locked in a tight struggle with the Kansas City Royals for the AL West lead, the California Angels pick up a pair of veteran left-handed pitchers. They acquire Tommy John, 39 and in his 19th MLB season, from the New York Yankees for fellow southpaw Dennis Rasmussen, 23 ("PTBNL"). The Angels also purchase the contract of John Curtis, 34, from the San Diego Padres. Three-time 20-game-winner John will go 4–2 (3.86) in seven starts down the stretch in September.

=== September ===
- September 1 – The San Diego Padres sign catcher Benito Santiago as an amateur free agent.
- September 3 – The Houston Astros receive 25-year-old southpaw pitchers Frank DiPino and Mike Madden and 23-year-old outfielder Kevin Bass from the Milwaukee Brewers to complete the August 30 Don Sutton trade.
- September 5 – Roy Smalley of the New York Yankees hits a pair of three-run home runs, one from each side of the plate, as New York beats the Kansas City Royals 18–7.
- September 6:
  - Labor Day games mark the "home stretch" of the 1982 regular season, and there are four divisional races.
    - In the NL West, the 76–61 Atlanta Braves' 8–2 loss at home to the San Francisco Giants and the 76–62 Los Angeles Dodgers' 7–2 triumph over the Reds at Cincinnati narrow Atlanta's lead to a half game. The NL East is almost as tight: Joaquín Andújar's 1–0, five-hit victory over the Montreal Expos and the Philadelphia Phillies' 4–3 loss to the Chicago Cubs increases the 77–59 St. Louis Cardinals' lead over the 76–61 Phils to 1½ games.
    - The American League races also are up for grabs. In the AL West, the 77–60 California Angels shave the 78–59 Kansas City Royals' lead to one game; they defeat the Chicago White Sox 8–6 as the Royals bow to the Seattle Mariners 6–2. In the AL East, by dropping a 6–5 contest at home to the Detroit Tigers, the 81–56 Milwaukee Brewers today lose ground to the 77–58 Baltimore Orioles and 77–59 Boston Red Sox, who beat the New York Yankees and Cleveland Indians respectively; but the Brewers still lead their rivals by three and 3½ games.
  - Veteran first baseman Willie Stargell, whose jersey #8 is retired, is saluted by 38,000 fans on his day at Pittsburgh's Three Rivers Stadium. The 41-year-old future Hall-of-Fame slugger delivers a pinch single in the Pirates' 6–1 win over the Mets.

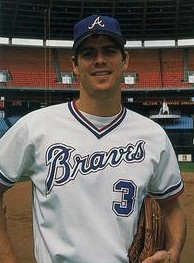
Dale Murphy in 1984

- September 8 – Entering the game as a late-inning substitute, Don Mattingly makes his MLB debut. Mattingly does not have an at bat in the New York Yankees' 10–5 win over the Baltimore Orioles.
- September 8–9 – The wild NL West race roars on when the Los Angeles Dodgers and Atlanta Braves meet head-to-head for a two-game, midweek set in Georgia's capital. In the opening contest, the teams combine for seven home runs and are knotted 11–11 after nine innings. Then, in the tenth, Dale Murphy's single plates Claudell Washington and secures a 12–11 Atlanta victory. The following night, the Braves rough up Fernando Valenzuela for eight runs over six innings and cruise to a 10–3 triumph. The series ends with the Braves holding a 1½-game lead in their division, with 22 yet to play.
- September 12:
  - Just a half-game behind in the NL East divisional race, the Philadelphia Phillies acquire right-handed starting pitcher John Denny from the Cleveland Indians for pitchers Jerry Reed and Roy Smith and Bahamian slugging prospect Wil Culmer. Denny, 29, will go 0–2 (4.03) over the rest of 1982, but his stellar 19–6 (2.37) performance in 1983 will win him his league's Cy Young Award and help the Phils capture the National League pennant.
  - Minnesota Twins pitcher Terry Felton, a 24-year-old former second-round draft pick, absorbs the loss today in an 18–7 debacle against the Kansas City Royals—his thirteenth defeat of the year against no wins. He'll pitch in two more games this month without earning a decision before leaving the major leagues. Coupled with his 1980 record of 0–3, Felton's 0–16 career MLB won–lost mark sets a futility record for the most losses without a big league win.
- September 13 – Each of the National League's divisional races see razor-thin lead changes.
  - In the East, at Veterans Stadium, future Hall of Famer Steve Carlton fires a complete game, 2–0 shutout and slams a solo home run, as the Philadelphia Phillies leapfrog the St. Louis Cardinals and vault into first place with a 2–0 victory. Carlton matches St. Louis' Bob Forsch by allowing only three hits.
  - In the West, Steve Garvey's 16th-inning solo homer seals an overtime, 4–3 victory for the home-standing Los Angeles Dodgers over the San Diego Padres. The outcome results in another divisional lead change when, in a battle of the Niekro brothers, the Houston Astros' Joe Niekro outduels his Hall of Fame-bound sibling Phil of the Atlanta Braves, 5–3. The Dodgers' margin, like the Phillies', is a half-game.
- September 17 – Winning their seventh straight game, 9–2 at home over the Houston Astros, the Dodgers widen their NL West margin to 3½ games (with 14 left in the season) over the Atlanta Braves, who lose at Cincinnati today for their fourth consecutive setback. The Dodgers' "magic number" is 12.
- September 20 – The St. Louis Cardinals win their eighth straight game since being vanquished by Steve Carlton on September 13. Today, at Busch Memorial Stadium, Joaquín Andújar and Bruce Sutter scatter nine hits and take down the second-place Philadelphia Phillies, 4–1, who have lost five of six during the same timespan. St. Louis (87–63) has gained six full games on the Phillies (81–68), and now holds a 5½-length advantage in the NL East.
- September 20–22 – The AL West race is tied going into a three-game showdown between the California Angels and Kansas City Royals, both 84–65, at Anaheim Stadium. By the time their series ends on the 22nd, the Angels are in total control, having swept all three contests, 3–2, 2–1 and 8–5. Clutch efforts by starting pitchers Geoff Zahn (two runs over eight innings) and Ken Forsch (complete game, one run) mark the first two wins; Doug DeCinces' two homers power the Angels in the third. They will preserve their three-game margin and win their second division title in history when both clubs go 6–4 over the season's final ten games.
- September 27:
  - In a year that features tense divisional races, the St. Louis Cardinals (91–66) are the first to clinch a playoff berth, capturing the NL East with a 4–2 victory over the Montreal Expos at Olympic Stadium. Hall-of-Famer Bruce Sutter is on the mound to close out the win, notching his 36th save. St. Louis wins its first NL East crown: the Redbirds' last trip to the postseason came in 1968, the last year before divisional play, when they dropped the World Series in seven games to the Detroit Tigers.
  - The NL West, which was the Los Angeles Dodgers' to lose ten days ago, is knotted up again. Phil Niekro's two-hit shutout, defeating the San Francisco Giants 7–0 at Candlestick Park, leads the Atlanta Braves back into a first place tie with the Angelenos, who today drop their sixth straight, 6–1, at home to the Cincinnati Reds. Both clubs are now 85–71.

=== October ===
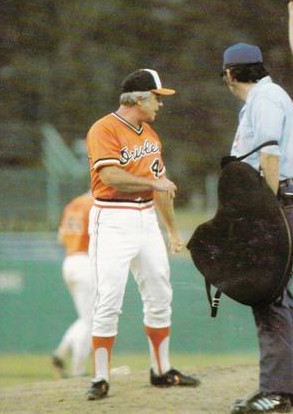
Earl Weaver in 1977

- October 1 – Through seven innings, the New York Mets' Terry Leach and the Philadelphia Phillies' John Denny have each only given up one hit. Denny is lifted in the ninth for a pinch hitter, however, Leach remains in the game through the tenth without giving up a second hit. A sacrifice fly by Hubie Brooks in the tenth off Porfi Altamirano is the deciding factor in the Mets' 1–0 victory at Veterans Stadium.
  - Fred Stanley of the Oakland Athletics goes 1 for 3 in a loss to the Kansas City Royals. Stanley retires at the conclusion of the season, and at the time, Stanley was the last active player who'd been a member of the Seattle Pilots.
- October 2 – The California Angels (92–69) sew up their second-ever AL West title, coming from behind to defeat the Texas Rangers 6–4 before 33,405 at Anaheim Stadium. Fred Lynn's two-run, fifth-inning homer is the division-winning hit. The second-place Kansas City Royals (90–71) are eliminated despite their 5–4 triumph over the Oakland Athletics.
- October 3:
  - At Baltimore's Memorial Stadium, the American League East title is decided before an ABC television audience. Robin Yount hits two home runs and Don Sutton outduels Jim Palmer as the Milwaukee Brewers (95–67) defeat the Baltimore Orioles (94–68) in an 11–2 rout. It's thought to be Earl Weaver's last game as the Orioles' manager—but he'll come out of retirement to manage them again on June 14, 1985.
  - At Candlestick Park, Joe Morgan's three-run, seventh-inning homer breaks a 2–2 tie and helps the San Francisco Giants beat the Los Angeles Dodgers 5–3, knocking the Dodgers (88–74) out of the postseason and giving the Atlanta Braves the NL West crown. The Braves (89–73) had lost 5–1 at San Diego today.
- October 4:
  - Embattled Cleveland Indians manager Dave Garcia resigns, saying "I believe it is best for the club, the fans and for me that I don't come back." Garcia, 62, managed Cleveland to a 247–244 (.503) record since July 23, 1979.
  - The Texas Rangers fire general manager Eddie Robinson and promote director of player development Joe Klein to succeed him.
- October 6 – The Atlanta Braves and St. Louis Cardinals play four innings of Game 1 of the 1982 NLCS when rain halts play in the bottom of the fifth with the Cardinals batting, three outs away from being an official game, and the Braves ahead, 1–0. The rain does not subside and the game is called. The Cardinals would go on to sweep the Braves and reach the 1982 World Series.
- October 10:
  - After being down 2–0 to the California Angels, the Milwaukee Brewers complete a three-game comeback, defeating the Angels 4–3 to capture their only American League Championship. Fred Lynn of the losing Angels is named the Most Valuable Player of the Series after going 11-for-18 with 5 RBI and 4 runs scored.
  - The St. Louis Cardinals defeat the Atlanta Braves 6–2, to capture their first National League championship in 14 years. Catcher Darrell Porter is the MVP with his five-for-nine effort, including three doubles.
- October 12:
  - The first game of the 1982 World Series features Paul Molitor setting a new Fall Classic record with five hits (in five at bats), as he leads the Milwaukee Brewers to a 10–0 victory over the St. Louis Cardinals at Busch Memorial Stadium.
  - The Montreal Expos' Tim Raines enters treatment for drug abuse. Raines claims to have spent a fifth of his salary on cocaine when he stole a National League-leading 78 bases during the regular season, and says he started sliding head first to avoid breaking the vial of cocaine he kept in his back pocket.
  - The Expos name Bill Virdon, 51, their manager for 1983, replacing Jim Fanning, who the previous week returned to the club's front office as vice president, player development. Montréal will be the fourth managerial address for Virdon since 1972. He won the that year's NL East title with the Pittsburgh Pirates, was selected 1974's Sporting News Manager of the Year with the New York Yankees, and, most recently, spent all or parts of eight years as pilot of the Houston Astros, leading them to two postseason appearances.
- October 15 – The Los Angeles Dodgers trade right-handed pitcher Ted Power to the Cincinnati Reds for infielder Mike Ramsey and cash.
- October 17 – In Game 5 of the 1982 World Series, a 6–4 Milwaukee Brewers victory, Robin Yount powers the victors with four hits, including a home run and a double. Along with his four-hit effort in Game 1, Yount becomes the first player ever to have two four-hit games in a single World Series.
- October 19 – The Baltimore Orioles release two veteran pitchers, southpaw Ross Grimsley, 32, and righty Don Stanhouse, 31.

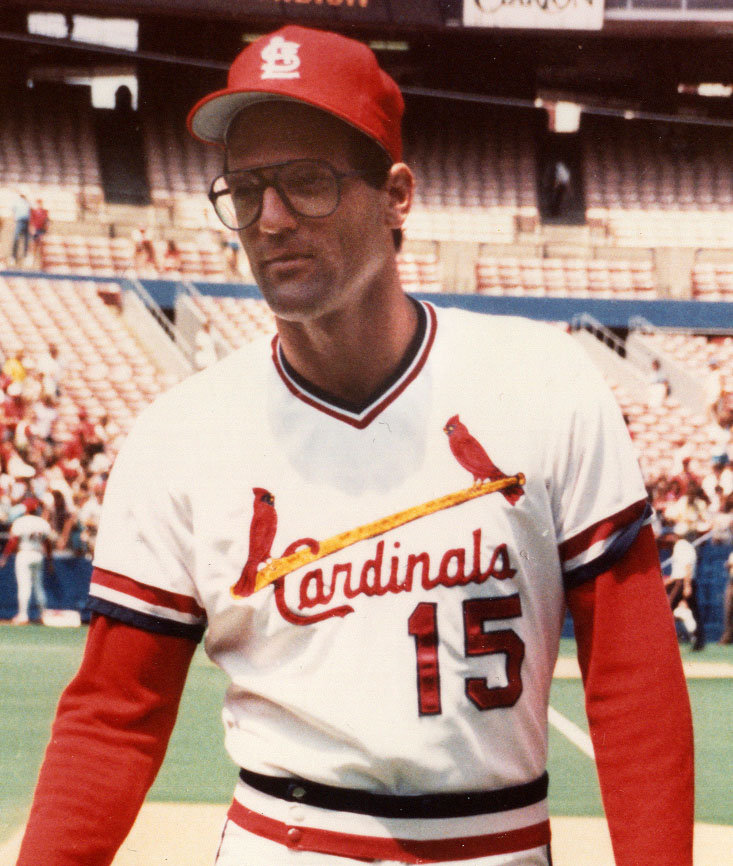
Darrell Porter in 1988

- October 20:
  - The St. Louis Cardinals win the decisive seventh game of the 1982 World Series, 6–3, over the Milwaukee Brewers, backed by 15 hits and the pitching of Joaquín Andújar and Bruce Sutter. Catcher Darrell Porter is selected Most Valuable Player, making him the first player chosen as MVP in both the LCS and World Series in the same season. The Cardinals win their first Fall Classic championship since 1967, and ninth in their history.
  - After three years of "Billy Ball" and the revival of the Oakland Athletics, manager and director of player development Billy Martin is fired by club president Roy Eisenhardt. Martin's first two seasons were rousing successes: he turned an almost-moribund franchise into a winning (83–79) outfit in 1980 and was named "Manager of the Year" by The Associated Press; he then led the 1981 Athletics to the best regular-season record in the American League and the ALCS. But the 1982 squad stumbled badly to a 68–94 mark, although they drew a franchise-record 1.74 million fans. Martin, 54, remains a sought-after manager; even before today's firing, he was negotiating with the Cleveland Indians to fill their vacant position and his attorney is rumored to be in talks with George Steinbrenner about arranging Martin's return to the New York Yankees for a third managerial term.
- October 22 – California Angels pilot Gene Mauch, who this year led his team to postseason play for the first time in his 23-year MLB managerial career, resigns his position. Mauch, 56, faced criticism for starting pitcher selection that may have cost the Angels this year's ALCS. On November 2, he will be succeeded by former Cincinnati Reds manager John McNamara.
- October 26 – Steve Carlton of the Philadelphia Phillies wins his fourth NL Cy Young Award, after winning 23 games—the only MLB pitcher to exceed 20 victories during 1982.

=== November ===
- November 1:
  - Bowie Kuhn, the Commissioner of Baseball since February 1969, is voted out of office by MLB owners. Kuhn, 56, survived a 1975 revolt by three American League owners before being elected to his second, seven-year term as baseball's czar. This time, however, it's the National League that forces his departure, when five of its 12 magnates vote "nay" on Kuhn's contract renewal—denying Kuhn the required 75% supermajority in each league to be re-elected. He's expected to serve out his term until his existing pact expires on August 13, 1983.
  - The Texas Rangers name former five-time NL Gold Glove Award-winning third baseman Doug Rader their manager for 1983. Rader, 38, has spent the past three seasons at the helm of the Triple-A Hawaii Islanders. He succeeds interim manager Darrell Johnson.
- November 4 – Mike Ferraro is appointed manager of the 1983 Cleveland Indians. Former MLB infielder and minor-league skipper Ferraro, 38, has been a New York Yankees' coach since 1979.
- November 5 – The New York Mets release former (1976) National League Cy Young Award recipient and two-time 20-game-winner Randy Jones, 32, ending his MLB pitching career.

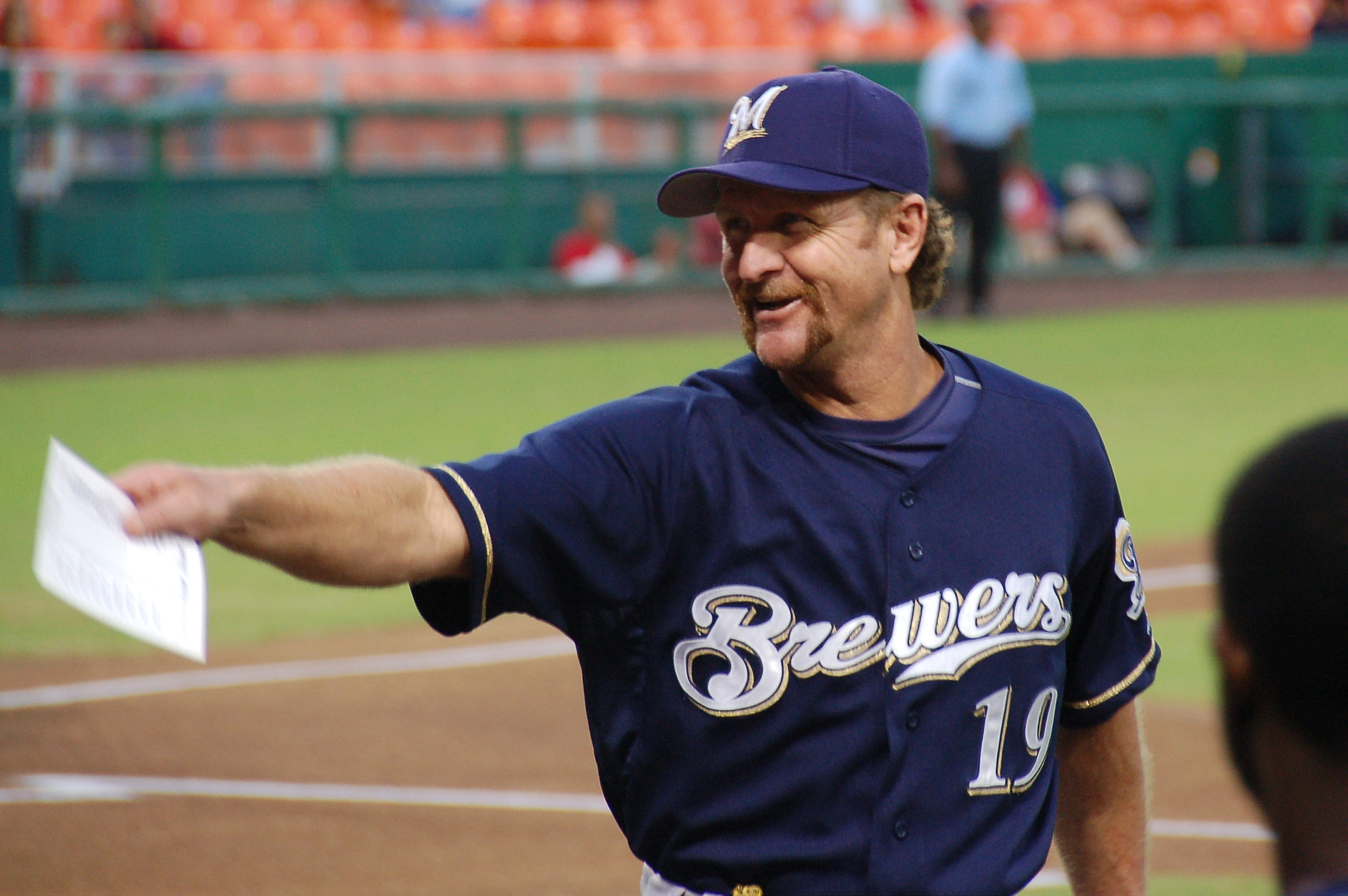
Robin Yount in 2006

- November 9 – Robin Yount of the Milwaukee Brewers is named American League MVP. During the Brewers' AL-pennant-winning season season, he batted .318 with 21 home runs, 103 RBIS and 19 steals.
- November 10 – Forty players—including veteran standouts Don Baylor (1979 AL MVP) and Steve Garvey (1974 NL MVP)—are granted free agency and will enter the market for new contracts.
- November 12 – Joe Altobelli, former manager of the San Francisco Giants (1977–1979), is named Earl Weaver's successor to pilot the Baltimore Orioles. Altobelli, 50, is no stranger to the Orioles; he was the highly successful skipper of their Triple-A Rochester Red Wings farm team before taking the Giants' job. Future Hall-of-Famer Weaver retired in October after 14½ seasons, four American League pennants, and one World Series championship.
- November 15 – Kansas City Royals DH and team leader Hal McRae, 36, signs a new contract to remain with the club, five days after being granted free agency. McRae led the American League in runs batted in (133) in 1982 and was named to his third All-Star team.
- November 16:
  - The Oakland Athletics fill their managerial vacancy by hiring former MLB third baseman Steve Boros, most recently a coach for the Montreal Expos. Boros, 46, succeeds Billy Martin, fired October 22. Martin's other Oakland assignment, as the Athletics' de facto general manager, will be assumed by the team's general counsel, Sandy Alderson, 35.
  - The Athletics sign left-handed reliever Tom Burgmeier, granted free agency from the Boston Red Sox on November 10.
- November 17 – Center fielder Dale Murphy wins the National League MVP Award, becoming the first Braves' player to be so honored since Hank Aaron in 1957. Murphy hit .281 with 36 home runs, 109 RBI, 113 runs, and 23 stolen bases.
- November 18:
  - The Cleveland Indians trade pitcher Ed Whitson to the San Diego Padres for pitcher Juan Eichelberger and first baseman Broderick Perkins.
  - The Kansas City Royals release veteran first baseman/DH Lee May.
- November 22 – Second baseman Steve Sax of the Los Angeles Dodgers is named National League Rookie of the Year, becoming the fourth consecutive player from the Dodgers to win the award. Sax hit .282 and stole 49 bases as the replacement for Davey Lopes in the Dodgers infield.
- November 24 – Cal Ripken Jr., who hit .264 with 28 home runs and 93 RBI as a shortstop and third baseman for the Baltimore Orioles, is named American League Rookie of the Year. Ripken gets 24 of 28 first place votes, with the others going to Kent Hrbek of the Minnesota Twins.

=== December ===
- December 1 – Three weeks after they enter the market, two headlining members of the free-agent "Class of 1982" agree to multi-year contracts with new teams:
  - Designated hitter Don Baylor, formerly of the California Angels, signs for four years and $3.15 million with the New York Yankees.
  - Relief pitcher Terry Forster, formerly of the Los Angeles Dodgers, signs for three years and $1.45 million with the Atlanta Braves.
- December 3 – Catcher Alan Ashby, granted free agency on November 10, remains with the Houston Astros, signing a three-year, $1.25 million contract.
- December 6:
  - The Oakland Athletics acquire third baseman and 1981 AL batting champion Carney Lansford, outfielder Garry Hancock and minor-league pitcher Jerry King from the Boston Red Sox for outfielder Tony Armas and catcher Jeff Newman. The formerly free-spending Red Sox are shunning the free agent market; they trade Lansford, 25, because he rejects their offer for a multi-year contract extension that will keep him from free agency after the 1983 season. He'll spend the next ten years as a key Oakland regular.
  - Free-agent southpaw Bob McClure opts to remain with the Milwaukee Brewers, agreeing to a four-year, $1.95 million contract.
- December 9:
  - An eye-catching interleague trade sees the Philadelphia Phillies and Cleveland Indians exchange highly ranked young players. The Phillies acquire outfielder Von Hayes from Cleveland for five players: pitcher Jay Baller, catcher Jerry Willard, second baseman Manny Trillo, shortstop Julio Franco and outfielder George Vukovich. The headliners, Hayes and Franco, both 24, will have noteworthy careers; Hayes is a Phillie regular for nine seasons, while Franco will still be playing in the majors at age 49 in 2007. In a separate transaction between the teams, the Phillies acquire infielder Larry Milbourne from the Indians for cash considerations.
  - Two AL East competitors, the Toronto Blue Jays and New York Yankees, pull off a five-player trade. Toronto acquires pitcher Mike Morgan, first baseman Fred McGriff and outfielder Dave Collins from New York for veteran right-hander Dale Murray and outfielder Tom Dodd, a former Yankee farmhand. McGriff is a prospect who has just turned 19; in 1986, he'll launch a Hall of Fame career as a slugging first baseman for the Blue Jays and five other MLB teams.
  - The Yankees replace Collins by signing outfielder Steve Kemp, granted free agency from the Chicago White Sox on November 10, to a five-year, $5.45 million contract.
  - The Chicago Cubs trade outfielder Steve Henderson to the Seattle Mariners for pitcher Rich Bordi.
- December 10:
  - The Houston Astros obtain right-handed pitcher Mike Scott from the New York Mets for outfielder Danny Heep. Scott, 27, has posted a 14–27 (4.64) record over 84 games and five seasons with the Mets. In Houston between 1983 and 1991, he'll go 110–81 and make three NL All-Star teams—including a sparkling, Cy Young Award-winning 1986 campaign in which he leads the National League in wins above replacement (8.4 bWAR), ERA (2.22), shutouts (five), innings pitched (2751/3), and strikeouts (305). He'll also account for Houston's only victories in the 1986 NLCS by firing two complete games, including a shutout, against his old team, the Mets.
  - The Astros also sign speedy outfielder Omar Moreno, granted free agency from the Pittsburgh Pirates on November 10.
- December 13 – The Chicago White Sox sign southpaw starting pitcher Floyd Bannister, 27, granted free agency in November from the Seattle Mariners. Bannister, a 1982 AL All-Star, agrees to a five-year, $4.79 million contract.
- December 14:
  - The San Francisco Giants trade future Hall-of-Fame second baseman Joe Morgan, 39, along with left-handed relief ace Al Holland, to the Philadelphia Phillies for pitchers Mark Davis and Mike Krukow and outfielder C. L. Penigar. Morgan and the Giants had reached an impasse over his 1983 salary; he and Holland will help Philadelphia win the 1983 NL pennant.

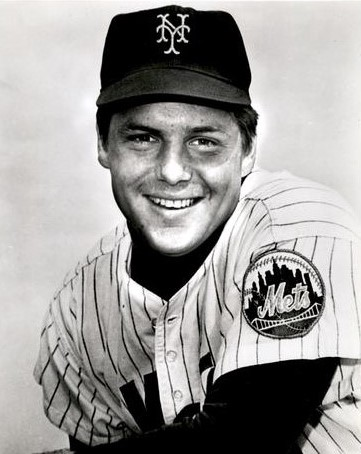
Tom Seaver during his early Mets' career

  - The St. Louis Cardinals and New York Yankees make a five-player, all-prospects trade. In it, St. Louis sends infielder Bobby Meacham, 22, and outfielder Stan Javier, 18, son of the Redbirds' standout second baseman of the 1960s, to the Yanks for pitchers Steve Fincher, 20, and Marty Mason, 24, and outfielder Bob Helsom, 24. Javier will play all or parts of 17 MLB seasons for eight teams, principally the Oakland Athletics.
- December 15 – Eight-year veteran outfielder Rick Manning remains with the Cleveland Indians, signing a five-year, $2.4 million contract with them after being granted free agency in November.
- December 16 – Almost exactly 5½ years after he departed the New York Mets in "the biggest and most controversial trade in Mets' history," future Hall-of-Fame pitcher Tom Seaver "come(s) home" when the Mets and Cincinnati Reds make official a four-player transaction. In it, New York sends pitcher Charlie Puleo and two minor-league outfielders, Lloyd McClendon (a future big-league player and manager who had spent 1982 at Class A) and Jason Felice, to Cincinnati in exchange for Seaver. During his first term (1967 to June 15, 1977) with the Mets, Seaver had gone 189–110 (2.49), with 2,406 strikeouts, leading his team to two National League pennants and the 1969 World Series championship, and capturing three NL Cy Young Awards (1969, 1973, 1975). Now 38, he struggled with a sore hip and shoulder in 1982, and won only five of 18 decisions in 21 games pitched for the last-place Reds.
- December 20 – The Atlanta Braves sign left-handed pitcher Pete Falcone, granted free agency from the Mets November 10.
- December 21:
  - The dismantling of the long-time Los Angeles Dodgers infield continues as its most productive and iconic member, first baseman Steve Garvey, an eight-time NL All-Star, 4× Gold Glove Award winner, and 1974 NL MVP, signs with the division rival San Diego Padres after being granted free agency November 10. Garvey's new five-year contract is valued at $6.6 million, plus bonuses. After all or part of 14 seasons, 1,727 games played and 1,938 hits in a Dodger uniform, he will become the face of a second Southern California team, with his clutch home run in Game 5 of the 1984 NLCS delivering the first pennant in San Diego's MLB history.
  - The Texas Rangers trade first baseman Pat Putnam to the Seattle Mariners for first-year relief pitcher Ron Musselman.
- December 22 – Lee Mazzilli's tenure with the New York Yankees ends after 37 games when the Bombers trade the 27-year-old outfielder to the Pittsburgh Pirates for four young players: pitcher Tim Burke, catcher Bubba Holland, infielder José Rivera and outfielder Jerry Aubin.
- December 23 – Free-agent Woodie Fryman agrees to return to the Montreal Expos for 1983. The 42-year-old relief pitcher went 9–4 (3.75) with 12 saves in 60 games for Montreal in 1982.
- December 28 – The New York Mets trade pitcher Pat Zachry to the Los Angeles Dodgers for outfielder/pinch hitter Jorge Orta.
- December 31 – Veteran left-handed starting pitcher Paul Splittorff remains with the Kansas City Royals, agreeing to a new contract after being granted free agency along with November's "Class of 1982." Known as "the Original Royal," Splittorff, 36, will spend his entire baseball career with the franchise, 15 years as a player and 24 more as a broadcaster.

== Births ==
=== January ===
- January 4 – Jason Bourgeois
- January 5:
  - Norichika Aoki
  - Dushan Ruzic
- January 6:
  - Brian Bass
  - Scott Thorman
- January 7:
  - Brayan Peña
  - Francisco Rodríguez
- January 9 – Tony Peña
- January 12:
  - Chris Ray
  - Dontrelle Willis
- January 15:
  - Melvin Dorta
  - Armando Galarraga
- January 19 – Terry Evans
- January 23 – Wily Mo Peña
- January 30 – Jorge Cantú
- January 31:
  - Yuniesky Betancourt
  - Brad Thompson

=== February ===
- February 1 – Jean Machi
- February 10 – Jamie Vermilyea
- February 16 – Manny Delcarmen
- February 17 – Brian Bruney
- February 19 – Chris Stewart
- February 20 – Jason Hirsh
- February 21 – Edwin Bellorín
- February 22:
  - Kelly Johnson
  - Adalberto Méndez
- February 24:
  - Nick Blackburn
  - J. D. Durbin
  - Gustavo Molina

=== March ===
- March 6 – Cristhian Martínez
- March 8 – Craig Stansberry
- March 11 – Brian Anderson
- March 12 – Zach Miner
- March 15 – Steven Jackson
- March 16 – Brian Wilson
- March 17 – A. J. Murray
- March 18:
  - Chad Cordero
  - Carlos Guevara
- March 19 – Landon Powell
- March 21 – Aaron Hill
- March 22 – Mike Morse
- March 24:
  - Corey Hart
  - Dustin McGowan
  - Heath Phillips
  - Robinson Tejeda
- March 26 – Brendan Ryan

=== April ===
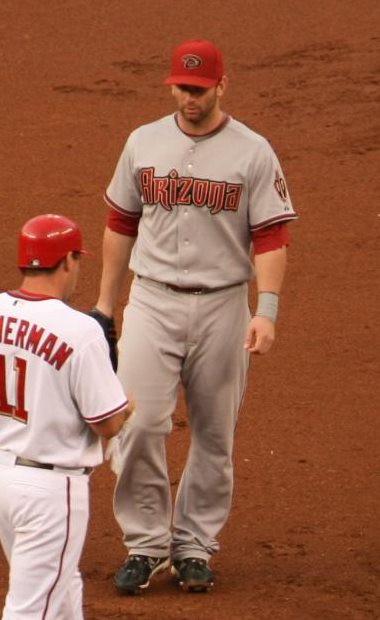
Josh Whitesell

- April 8 – Kason Gabbard
- April 9 – Chad Reineke
- April 10:
  - Chris Dickerson
  - Andre Ethier
  - Colt Morton
- April 12 – Justin Ruggiano
- April 14 – Josh Whitesell
- April 15 – Michael Aubrey
- April 22:
  - Andrew Graham
  - David Purcey
- April 25 – Brian Barton
- April 26 – Alejandro Machado
- April 28 – Jim Miller

=== May ===
- May 3:
  - Bob McCrory
  - Nick Stavinoha
- May 4 – Matt Tolbert
- May 7:
  - Conor Jackson
  - Luis Jiménez
- May 8 – Adrián González
- May 12 – Jamie D'Antona
- May 14 – Kevin Melillo
- May 15 – Rafael Pérez
- May 16 – Eugenio Vélez
- May 17 – Nick Masset
- May 21 – Ed Lucas
- May 24 – Kevin Frandsen
- May 25:
  - Jason Kubel
  - Brad Snyder
- May 26:
  - Joe Koshansky
  - Carlos Martínez
- May 28 – Jhonny Peralta
- May 29 – Matt Macri

=== June ===
- June 2 – Tim Stauffer
- June 7 – Virgil Vasquez
- June 9 – Buck Coats
- June 11:
  - Bobby Keppel
  - Josh Newman
- June 14 – Mike Hollimon
- June 19 – Dusty Brown
- June 21:
  - Dae-ho Lee
  - Arnie Muñoz
- June 22:
  - Ian Kinsler
  - Jason Motte
- June 23 – Matt Daley
- June 25 – Paul Maholm
- June 29 – Dusty Hughes
- June 30:
  - Mitch Maier
  - Delwyn Young

=== July ===
- July 1 – Justin Huber
- July 3 – Logan Kensing
- July 8 – Renyel Pinto
- July 12 – Tom Gorzelanny
- July 13:
  - Shin-Soo Choo
  - Yadier Molina
- July 14 – Enrique González
- July 15:
  - Fernando Nieve
  - Seung-hwan Oh
  - Ryan Wagner
- July 16 – Jason Windsor
- July 17 – Brian Rogers
- July 18 – Josh Banks
- July 19 – Phil Coke
- July 20:
  - Jake Fox
  - Jason Miller
- July 22 – Rob Johnson
- July 23 – Joe Mather

=== August ===
- August 2 – Grady Sizemore
- August 4:
  - Josh Roenicke
  - Seiichi Uchikawa
- August 6 – Justin Germano
- August 8:
  - Matthew Brown
  - Donny Lucy
  - Ross Ohlendorf
- August 10:
  - Josh Anderson
  - Jeff Frazier
- August 16 – Freddy Sandoval
- August 17 – Travis Metcalf
- August 18 – Josh Rupe
- August 19 – J. J. Hardy
- August 25 – Shayne Watson
- August 26 – Jayson Nix
- August 28:
  - Carlos Quentin
  - Randy Wells
- August 30 – Sean Marshall
- August 31 – Josh Kroeger

=== September ===
- September 2:
  - Jason Hammel
  - Rommie Lewis
  - Wes Littleton
- September 3 – Bobby Livingston
- September 8 – Geno Espineli
- September 12 – Carmen Pignatiello
- September 13 – Rickie Weeks
- September 16:
  - Chris Carter
  - Michael Martínez
  - Ramón Ramírez
- September 17:
  - Sean Burnett
  - Danny Putnam
- September 18 – Joe Bisenius
- September 21 – Greg Burke
- September 24 – Jeff Karstens
- September 25 – Argenis Reyes
- September 26 – Daniel McCutchen
- September 28:
  - Héctor Giménez
  - Micah Owings
- September 30 – Seth Smith

=== October ===
- October 3:
  - Brett Carroll
  - Matt Young
- October 4:
  - Tony Gwynn Jr.
  - Ryan Sadowski
  - Jered Weaver
- October 5 – Mike Hinckley
- October 9 – Jason Jaramillo
- October 11 – Jeff Larish
- October 12:
  - Casey McGehee
  - Paul Janish
- October 14:
  - Jerry Gil
  - Carlos Mármol
- October 17 – Abe Alvarez
- October 18 – Ross Wolf
- October 19 – J. A. Happ
- October 21 – Jim Henderson
- October 22:
  - Brian Bixler
  - Robinson Canó
  - Darren O'Day
  - Carlos Torres
- October 24 – Macay McBride
- October 28:
  - Jeremy Bonderman
  - Anthony Lerew
- October 29 – Will Venable
- October 30:
  - Anderson Hernández
  - Jonathan Albaladejo
  - Manny Parra
- October 31 – Alex Hinshaw

=== November ===
- November 2 – Yunel Escobar
- November 4:
  - Travis Blackley
  - Evan MacLane
  - Chris Resop
- November 5 – Bryan LaHair
- November 7 – Brian Horwitz
- November 10 – Matt Pagnozzi
- November 14:
  - Angel Castro
  - Fu-Te Ni
- November 15 – Jerad Head
- November 16 – Tim Wood
- November 17 – Ty Taubenheim
- November 18 – Brent Leach
- November 19 – Jonathan Sánchez
- November 29 – Tony Giarratano

=== December ===
- December 2 – Wyatt Toregas
- December 3 – Manny Corpas
- December 4 – Matt Fox
- December 8 – Alfredo Aceves
- December 12 – Ervin Santana
- December 13 – Ricky Nolasco
- December 14 – Josh Fields
- December 16:
  - Chris Britton
  - Iván Ochoa
- December 17:
  - Josh Barfield
  - Juan Mateo
- December 19 – Jeff Baisley
- December 20 – David Wright
- December 21 – Philip Humber
- December 23 – Brad Nelson
- December 25 – Rubén Gotay
- December 27:
  - Michael Bourn
  - Chris Gimenez
- December 29:
  - Brad Davis
  - Kevin Hart
- December 30 – James Hoey
- December 31:
  - Ronald Belisario
  - Julio DePaula

== Deaths ==
=== January ===
- January 2 – Hugo Klaerner, 73, Chicago White Sox pitcher who appeared in three games during September 1934.
- January 5 – Neal Baker, 77, pitcher who worked in five games for 1927 Philadelphia Athletics.
- January 6 – Wally Post, 52, right fielder who played in 1,204 games, most notably with the Cincinnati Reds/Redlegs and Philadelphia Phillies, between 1949 and 1964, and known for his home run power.
- January 7 – Chet Falk, 76, left-handed pitcher who appeared in 40 games for the 1925–1927 St. Louis Browns.
- January 12 – Curtis Henderson, 70, shortstop/third baseman for six Negro leagues teams between 1936 and 1946, including the New York Black Yankees and the Toledo/Indianapolis Crawfords; All-Star selection in 1940.
- January 14 – Jesse Hubbard, 86, outfielder/pitcher whose career in the Negro Leagues and Black baseball extended from 1919 to 1935.
- January 15 – Red Smith, 76, Pulitzer Prize-winning sportswriter whose career lasted from 1927 until his death; described by Ernest Hemingway as "the most important force in American sportswriting".
- January 18:
  - Bob Addie, 71, sportswriter for Washington, D.C., newspapers for nearly 40 years who covered both Senators franchises.
  - Bob Barrett, 82, infielder who played in 239 games for the Chicago Cubs, Brooklyn Robins and Boston Red Sox over five seasons spanning 1923 to 1929.
  - Johnny Tobin, 61, third baseman who played in 84 games for the 1945 Red Sox and a mainstay of Pacific Coast League between 1948 and 1957; brother of Jim Tobin.
- January 21 – Al Lefevre, 83, infielder who played in 21 games for the 1920 New York Giants.
- January 22 – Les Willis, 74, southpaw pitcher and veteran minor-leaguer who appeared in 22 games as a 39-year-old MLB rookie for 1947 Cleveland Indians.
- January 23 – Jim Hopper, 62, pitcher who appeared in two games for 1946 Pittsburgh Pirates.
- January 24 – Ben Shields, 78, left-handed pitcher who appeared in 13 games between 1924 and 1931 for the New York Yankees, Boston Red Sox and Philadelphia Phillies.
- January 27 – Bill Haeffner, 87, catcher who appeared in 59 games over three seasons between 1915 and 1928, mainly for the 1920 Pittsburgh Pirates.
- January 28:
  - Marion Cunningham, 86, first baseman who played in 131 games for the 1924–1925 Memphis Red Sox of the Negro National League.
  - Henry Peploski, 76, third baseman and native of Poland who appeared six games for 1929 Boston Braves.
  - Hub Pruett, 81, nicknamed "Shucks", left-handed pitcher who went only 29–48 (4.63 ERA) in 211 appearances for four clubs over seven years between 1922 and 1932, but as a rookie with the St. Louis Browns gained a lasting reputation for effectiveness against Babe Ruth.
  - Paul Schreiber, 79, pitcher who appeared in dozen games for 1922–1923 Brooklyn Robins and 1945 New York Yankees; had a long post-playing career as a batting practice pitcher and coach for the Yankees and Boston Red Sox.
- January 31 – Marvin Milkes, 58, baseball executive and general manager of 1969 Seattle Pilots and 1970 Milwaukee Brewers; immortalized in Jim Bouton's Ball Four.
- January – Jimmy Ford, 69, outfielder who played for eight clubs, including the Memphis Red Sox, Harrisburg Stars and New York Black Yankees, in the Negro leagues between 1937 and 1945; selected an All-Star in 1941.

=== February ===
- February 1 – Ed "Doc" Edelen, 69, pitcher who appeared in two games for 1932 Washington Senators at age 20; after baseball, practiced medicine in Charles County, Maryland, for 40 years.
- February 8 – Eddie Turchin, 64, infielder who played 11 games for the 1943 Cleveland Indians.
- February 12 – Dale Alderson, 63, pitcher who made 16 total appearances for 1943–1944 Chicago Cubs.
- February 17 – Nestor Chylak, 59, American League umpire from 1954 to 1978 who worked in five World Series and six All-Star games; elected to the Baseball Hall of Fame in 1999.
- February 21 – Ray Shearer, 52, outfielder and minor-league veteran who received a brief trial with 1957 Milwaukee Braves, appearing in two games and garnering three plate appearances.
- February 26 – "Wild Bill" Miller, 71, St. Louis Browns pitcher who appeared in one inning (allowing four bases on balls) in his only big-league appearance on October 2, 1937.
- February 28 – Roy Sherid, 75, pitcher who went 23–24 (4.71 ERA) with six saves in 87 games for the 1929–1931 New York Yankees.

=== March ===
- March 4 – Bill DeWitt, 79, executive who spent more than 60 years in major leagues, beginning as a teen-aged soda pop vendor; general manager (1936–1951), minority owner (1936−1948) and principal owner (1949–1951) of St. Louis Browns; general manager (1961–1966) and owner (1962–1966) of Cincinnati Reds; president of Detroit Tigers (1959–1960); board chairman of Chicago White Sox (1976–1981); father and grandfather of owners or senior baseball executives.
- March 8 – Tom Hussey, 71, sportscaster who described games of the Boston Red Sox (1939–1953) and Boston Bees/Braves (1939–1950).
- March 12 – Bill Andrus, 74, third baseman and pinch hitter who appeared in six MLB games in trials for the 1931 Washington Senators and 1937 Philadelphia Phillies.
- March 15 – Eddie Mulligan, 87, banjo-hitting third baseman/shortstop in 350 games for the 1915–1916 Chicago Cubs, 1921–1922 Chicago White Sox, and 1928 Pittsburgh Pirates; fixture as a player in the Pacific Coast League between 1919 and 1938, then served as president of the California League from 1956 to 1975.
- March 17 – Lunie Danage, 86, second baseman and third baseman who appeared in 57 games for the 1920 St. Louis Giants of the Negro National League.
- March 21 – Ollie Sax, 77, who appeared in 16 games as a third baseman and pinch runner for the 1929 St. Louis Browns of the American League.

=== April ===
- April 4:
  - Eli Chism, 65, outfielder for the 1946 Cleveland Buckeyes and 1947 Birmingham Black Barons of the Negro American League.
  - Mel Queen, 64, pitcher who worked in 146 games over eight seasons spanning 1942 to 1952 for the New York Yankees and Pittsburgh Pirates; father of the MLB pitcher/outfielder and manager.
- April 8 – Alonzo Boone, 74, pitcher who spent much of his Negro leagues tenure (1929 to 1947) with Cleveland-based teams; managed 1948 Buckeyes to a 39–37 record.
- April 9:
  - Francisco Barrios, 28, pitcher for the Chicago White Sox from 1974 to 1981; suffered a fatal heart attack on eve of 1982 season.
  - Hank Hulvey, 84, Philadelphia Athletics pitcher who hurled in one game for them on September 5, 1923.
- April 13 – Ray Knode, 81, first baseman/pinch runner in 109 games for Cleveland Indians from 1923 to 1926.
- April 14 – Kermit Dial, 74, infielder for the Chicago American Giants, Columbus Blue Birds and Detroit Stars of the Negro leagues between 1932 and 1937.
- April 24 – Buster Ross, 79, left-handed pitcher who appeared in 64 games, mostly as a reliever, for 1924–1926 Boston Red Sox.
- April 25 – Norman Cross, 71, who pitched for the Chicago American Giants of the Negro leagues in 1932–1933 and 1937.
- April 26 – Mike Kelly, 79, pitcher who worked in four games for the Philadelphia Phillies in September 1926.
- April 27 – Truck Hannah, 92, catcher in 244 career games for 1918–1920 New York Yankees; played in minors for 28 seasons, 22 of them in the Pacific Coast League—18 of those spent with the Los Angeles Angels; charter member of the PCL Hall of Fame.
- April 30 – Leo Dickerman, 85, pitcher who hurled in 89 career games for the Brooklyn Robins (1923–1924) and St. Louis Cardinals (1924–1925).
- April – Frank McCoy, 70, left-handed-hitting catcher whose Negro leagues career spanned 1929 to 1943 and included service with three Newark, New Jersey–based teams.

=== May ===
- May 2 – Leo Callahan, 91, outfielder who got into 114 National League games with 1913 Brooklyn Superbas and 1919 Philadelphia Phillies.
- May 6 – Beauty McGowan, 80, outfielder whose five MLB seasons were spaced over a 16-year span; appeared in 375 total games for 1922–1923 Philadelphia Athletics, 1928–1929 St. Louis Browns and 1937 Boston Bees.
- May 9 – John Smith, 75, first baseman for the 1931 Boston Red Sox.
- May 11 – Dave Malarcher, 87, infielder and manager in the Negro leagues who led the Chicago American Giants to World Series titles in 1926–1927 and the Indianapolis ABC's to a 1933 pennant.
- May 17 – Dixie Walker, 71, five-time All-Star outfielder who batted .306 lifetime during an 18-season career with five MLB clubs and gained his greatest popularity ("The People's Cherce") with the Brooklyn Dodgers (1939–1947); NL batting champion in 1944; brother, son and nephew of major leaguers.
- May 20 – Greene Farmer, 62, outfielder who appeared for Negro leagues clubs between 1942 and 1947.
- May 29 – Erv Palica, 54, pitcher who worked in 246 career games for the Brooklyn Dodgers (1947–1951 and 1953–1954) and Baltimore Orioles (1955–1956).
- May 30 – Charlie Gooch, 79, who appeared in 39 games as a pinch hitter, first and third baseman for the 1929 Washington Senators.

=== June ===
- June 4 – Tony Kaufmann, 81, pitcher/outfielder for the Chicago Cubs, St. Louis Cardinals and Philadelphia Phillies for a dozen seasons between 1921 and 1935; later a coach for 1947–1950 Cardinals, scout, and minor-league manager.
- June 7:
  - Lou DiMuro, 51, AL umpire since 1963 who worked two World Series, three ALCS and four All-Star Games.
  - Art Johnson, 85, left-hander who got into one game, tossing three shutout innings, for the New York Giants on September 18, 1927.
- June 8:
  - Irv Jeffries, 76, infielder in 175 career games with 1930–1931 Chicago White Sox and 1934 Philadelphia Phillies.
  - Satchel Paige, 75, Hall of Fame pitcher in the Negro leagues, mainly with the Kansas City Monarchs, who was black baseball's biggest star for much of his career; won 28 major league games after debuting at age 42; in 1971 became the second Negro leaguer elected to Hall of Fame, behind Jackie Robinson who was elected in 1962; at age 59, threw three scoreless innings for the Kansas City Athletics against the Boston Red Sox on September 25, 1965.
- June 11 – Jack Hallett, 67, pitcher for Chicago White Sox, Pittsburgh Pirates and New York Giants who appeared in 73 games over six seasons between 1940 and 1948.
- June 12 – Webster McDonald, 82, pitcher in Negro leagues and Black baseball whose career lasted from 1922 to 1940; two-time Negro World Series champ as member of 1926–1927 Chicago American Giants; stalwart hurler for 1930s Philadelphia Stars, where he also was the player-manager from 1934 to 1936; led Negro National League pitchers in victories in 1935.
- June 13 – Randy Bobb, 34, catcher who appeared in ten games for the 1968–1969 Chicago Cubs.
- June 14 – Red Evans, 75, right-hander who posted a 1–11 won–lost record (6.21 ERA) in 25 career games for the 1936 Chicago White Sox and 1939 Brooklyn Dodgers, for whom he was the Opening Day starting pitcher in Leo Durocher's first game as an MLB manager.
- June 19 – Samuel Burris, 62, pitcher for the 1940 Birmingham Black Barons and St. Louis–New Orleans Stars of the Negro American League.
- June 27 – Eddie Morgan, 77, outfielder/first baseman for the St. Louis Cardinals and Brooklyn Dodgers, who hit a pinch-hit home run in his first major league at-bat.

=== July ===
- July 1:
  - Footsie Blair, 81, infielder and pinch hitter in 246 games for 1929–1931 Chicago Cubs.
  - Ray Scarborough, 64, pitcher who went 80–85 (4.13) in 318 games over ten MLB seasons (1942–1943 and 1946–1953) for five American League teams, most notably the Washington Senators; later, a longtime scout and special assistant for general manager Harry Dalton.
- July 3 – Spencer Harris, 81, outfielder who played in 146 big-league games for Chicago White Sox (1925–1926), Washington Senators (1929) and Philadelphia Athletics (1930), but logged 26 seasons in the minors between 1921 and 1948, and was credited with 3,617 hits.
- July 6 – "Indian Bob" Johnson, 76, eight-time All-Star left fielder with the Philadelphia Athletics (1933–1942), Washington Senators (1943) and Boston Red Sox (1944–1945), who had eight 100-RBI seasons and scored 100 runs six times.
- July 7 – "Jumping Joe" Dugan, 85, third baseman who appeared in 1,447 games for five MLB clubs between 1917 and 1931, notably the 1922–1928 New York Yankees, where he was a key member of three World Series champions, including the 1927 "Murderers' Row" edition.
- July 11 – Chet Nichols, 85, pitcher who posted a 1–8 (7.19) record in 44 games for three NL clubs over six seasons between 1926 and 1932; father of pitcher Chet Jr.
- July 14 – Jackie Jensen, 55, All-Star right fielder who starred for the Boston Red Sox; won the AL's 1958 MVP award and led the league in RBI three times, but retired at 34 due to an intense fear of flying; first athlete to play in both the World Series and football's Rose Bowl.
- July 18:
  - Andy Anderson, 59, infielder who batted .184 in 223 at bats over 122 games for the 1948–1949 St. Louis Browns.
  - Pete Layden, 62, NFL quarterback who also played in Major League Baseball in 41 games as a centerfielder for the 1948 Browns.
- July 20 – Grover Froese, 66, American League umpire in 1952 and 1953.
- July 22 – Lloyd Waner, 76, nicknamed "Little Poison", Hall of Fame center fielder who played in the Pittsburgh Pirates outfield next to his brother Paul; a career .316 hitter who led the NL in hits, runs and triples once each, his 1967 Hall election made them the first brothers to be inducted.
- July 23 – Roberto Peña, 45, Dominican shortstop/second baseman who played in 587 games for five teams over six seasons spanning 1965–1971; scored winning run in the 1969 San Diego Padres' first-ever National League victory.
- July 24 – Lin Storti, 75, switch-hitting third baseman and second baseman for 1930–1933 St. Louis Browns, appearing in 216 career games.
- July 27 – Sug Jones, 74, who batted .364 in an 11-game career with the 1932 Little Rock Grays of the Negro Southern League as a first baseman, center fielder and catcher.
- July 28 – Lefty Wallace, 60, pitcher who appeared in 51 games for the Boston Braves (1942 and 1945–1946).
- July 29 – Lute Boone, 92, infielder who appeared in 315 career games for the 1913–1916 New York Yankees and 1918 Pittsburgh Pirates.

=== August ===
- August 5 – John Chism, also Chisum, 67, third baseman for the 1937 St. Louis Stars of the Negro American League; elder brother of Eli Chism, who died April 4.
- August 8 – Al Gould, 89, pitcher for two seasons with the Cleveland Indians (1916–1917).
- August 17 – Moxie Meixell, 94, outfielder who appeared in three games for the Cleveland Naps (the Indians' previous nickname) in July 1912.
- August 20 – Hank Johnson, 76, pitcher for the New York Yankees, Boston Red Sox, Philadelphia Athletics and Cincinnati Reds, who had several victorious seasons as a Yankee in the 1930s.
- August 22 – Ebba St. Claire, 61, catcher for the Boston/Milwaukee Braves and New York Giants from 1951 to 1954; father of Randy St. Claire.
- August 23 – Henry Merchant, 64, outfielder/pitcher/first baseman for the Chicago American Giants and Cincinnati–Indianapolis Clowns of the Negro American League, 1940 to 1948.
- August 25 – Ray Steineder, 87, relief pitcher who appeared in 29 total games for the 1923–1924 Pittsburgh Pirates and 1924 Philadelphia Phillies.
- August 29 – Charlie Niebergall, 83, catcher in 54 games over three seasons (1921, 1923–1924) for the St. Louis Cardinals; later, a scout.

=== September ===
- September 4:
  - Buster Bray, 69, outfielder who played four games for 1941 Boston Braves.
  - Ramón López , 49, Cuban-born right-hander whose pro career lasted 17 seasons and included four games pitched for the California Angels in 1966.
- September 5 – Tom Hurd, 58, pitched from 1954 through 1956 for the Boston Red Sox.
- September 7 – Ken Boyer, 51, seven-time All-Star third baseman with the St. Louis Cardinals who won the NL's 1964 MVP award and five Gold Gloves; batted .300 five times and had eight 90-RBI seasons; member of 1964 World Series champions whose grand-slam homer in Game 4 provided all the runs in a 4–3 Redbird triumph; managed Cardinals from April 29, 1978, to June 8, 1980; brother of Clete and Cloyd Boyer.
- September 18 – Clyde McCullough, 65, catcher who played 1,098 games for Chicago Cubs (1940–1943, 1945–1948 and 1953–1956) and Pittsburgh Pirates (1949–1952); minor league manager and instructor; coach for three MLB teams, serving as bullpen coach of San Diego Padres at the time of his death.
- September 23 – Lefty Mills, 72, southpaw hurler who spent his entire 96-game MLB career with St. Louis Browns (1934 and 1937–1940).
- September 28 – Ed White, 56, former University of Alabama athlete who went two for four during a three-game, September 1955 trial with the Chicago White Sox; star running back for Crimson Tide drafted by Washington Redskins in 1950.
- September 29 – Monty Stratton, 70, All-Star pitcher for the Chicago White Sox who attempted to make a baseball comeback after a hunting accident cost him a leg, inspiring an Oscar-winning 1949 movie that featured actor James Stewart as Stratton.

=== October ===
- October 4 – Red Barron, 82, appeared as a left fielder and pinch runner in ten games for the 1929 Boston Braves.
- October 8 – Bill Meehan, 93, right-hander who started (and lost) his only MLB game on September 17, 1915, as a member of a last-place (43–109) Philadelphia Athletics squad.
- October 13 – Alonzo Perry, 60, pitcher/outfielder for the 1946 Homestead Grays (Negro National League) and 1947–1948 Birmingham Black Barons (Negro American League).
- October 17 – Hank McDonald, 71, pitcher who appeared in 48 games as a member of the 1931 and 1933 Philadelphia Athletics and 1933 St. Louis Browns.
- October 18 – Bob Vines, 85, relief pitcher in nine games for 1924 St. Louis Cardinals and 1925 Philadelphia Phillies.
- October 19 – George Bradley, 68, center fielder and pinch hitter in four games for 1946 St. Louis Browns.
- October 26 – Bud Podbielan, 58, pitcher for the Brooklyn Dodgers, Cincinnati Reds and Cleveland Indians between 1949 and 1959.
- October 29:
  - Bill O'Donnell, 56, sportscaster; member of the Baltimore Orioles' broadcast team from 1966 until ill health forced him to retire in early 1982; also served as #2 play-by-play man for NBC-TV's MLB Game of the Week.
  - Tom Sheehan, 88, pitcher for four MLB clubs between 1915 and 1926 who went 1–16 for horrific 1916 Philadelphia Athletics squad; later a coach, scout and minor league skipper who became oldest rookie manager in big-league annals when, at age 66, he was named pilot of the San Francisco Giants on June 18, 1960.
  - Pinky Woods, 62, pitcher who hurled in 85 games for the wartime Boston Red Sox between 1943 and 1945.
- October 31 – Sheriff Blake, 83, pitcher who appeared in 304 total games over ten seasons spanning 1920 to 1937 for five clubs, principally the Chicago Cubs; led NL in shutouts (4) in 1928.

=== November ===
- November 2 – Bill Zuber, 69, pitcher who worked in 224 games for the Cleveland Indians (1936, 1938–1940), Washington Senators (1941–1942), New York Yankees (1943–1946) and Boston Red Sox (1946); member of 1943 World Series champions.
- November 3 – Ray Fisher, 95, pitcher for the Yankees and Reds who started Game 3 of the 1919 World Series; coached at Michigan for 38 years, winning the 1953 College World Series.
- November 6 – Al Baker, 76, pitcher for the Boston Red Sox in the 1930s.
- November 7 – Jim Bivin, 72, pitcher for the 1935 Philadelphia Phillies.
- November 12 – Cass Michaels, 56, All-Star second baseman for the White Sox, Senators, Browns and Athletics whose career ended prematurely when he was hit by a pitch in the head in 1954.
- November 17 – Johnny Davis, 65, two-time All-Star outfielder for the 1940–1948 Newark Eagles of the Negro National League.
- November 20 – Bob Short, 65, baseball and basketball club owner; bought expansion Washington Senators on December 3, 1968, moved them to Arlington, Texas, as the Texas Rangers after the 1971 season, then sold franchise to Brad Corbett on May 29, 1974; earlier, he owned the NBA's Minneapolis Lakers and moved them to Los Angeles in 1960, selling them to Jack Kent Cooke in 1965.
- November 21:
  - Buck Marrow, 73, pitcher for 1932 Detroit Tigers and 1937–1938 Brooklyn Dodgers; worked in 39 career MLB games.
  - Frank McCormick, 71, standout first baseman for Cincinnati Reds (1934; 1937–1945), Philadelphia Phillies (1946–1947) and Boston Braves (1947–1948); led National League in hits for three straight seasons (1938–1940, inclusive), doubles (1940) and runs batted in (1939); eight-time NL All-Star and 1940 Most Valuable Player; batted .299 lifetime with 1,711 hits; member of Cincinnati's 1940 World Series champions; later a Reds' broadcaster and coach.
- November 22:
  - Roy Hofheinz, 70, former Houston mayor and county judge who was a founding co-owner of the Colt .45s/Astros franchise in 1959 and became majority owner six years later; driving force behind construction of the Astrodome, the first major-league domed stadium (opened in 1965); maintained controlling interest in the Astros until selling them in 1979.
  - Marcellus Thomas, 65, outfielder for the 1937 St. Louis Stars of the Negro American League.
- November 26 – Hub Walker, 76, outfielder in 297 games in five MLB seasons spread over 15 calendar years (1931, 1935–1937, 1945) for the Detroit Tigers and Cincinnati Reds; member of Tigers' 1945 World Series champions; brother of Gee Walker.
- November 29:
  - Al Cicotte, 52, well-traveled right-hander who pitched in 102 games over five seasons for the New York Yankees, Washington Senators, Detroit Tigers, Cleveland Indians, St. Louis Cardinals and Houston Colt .45s between 1957 and 1962.
  - Mays Copeland, 69, right-hander who pitched in one game for the Cardinals on April 27, 1935.

=== December ===
- December 4 – Duke Sedgwick, 84, pitcher in 21 career MLB games for the 1921 Philadelphia Phillies and 1923 Washington Senators.
- December 9 – Jimmy Adair, 75, shortstop who played 18 games in MLB for 1931 Chicago Cubs; later a longtime coach (1951–1952; 1957–1965) and scout.
- December 10 – Charlie Wheatley, 89, pitcher who posted a poor 1–4 (6.17 ERA) record for the 1912 Detroit Tigers (and set a record with five wild pitches in a single game), then became a millionaire entrepreneur and manufacturer after baseball.
- December 22
  - Tony Faeth, 89, relief pitcher who worked in 19 games for the 1919–1920 Cleveland Indians.
  - John Mercer, 90, first baseman who appeared in one game for the St. Louis Cardinals on June 25, 1912.
- December 27 – Harry Kingman, 90, first baseman and pinch hitter in four games for the 1914 New York Yankees; the son of an American missionary, he is the only MLB player (as of 2022) to have been born in mainland China; after baseball, became a missionary himself as well as a civil-rights activist.
