= John Chisum (baseball) =

American baseball player (1915–1982)

- Third baseman
- Born: April 5, 1915; Marianna, Arkansas, U.S.
- Died: August 5, 1982 (aged 67); St. Louis, Missouri, U.S.
- Batted: Right Threw: Right

Negro league baseball debut
- 1937, for the St. Louis Stars

Last appearance
- 1937, for the St. Louis Stars
- Stats at Baseball Reference

Teams
- St. Louis Stars (1937)

John "Big" Chisum (April 5, 1915 – August 5, 1982), also listed as John Chism, was an American professional baseball third baseman in the Negro leagues. He played with the St. Louis Stars in 1937. His brother, Eli, also played in the Negro leagues. and his statistics are combined with John's in some sources.
