= List of baseball parks in St. Louis =

This is a list of venues used for professional baseball in St. Louis, Missouri. The information is a compilation of the information contained in the references listed.

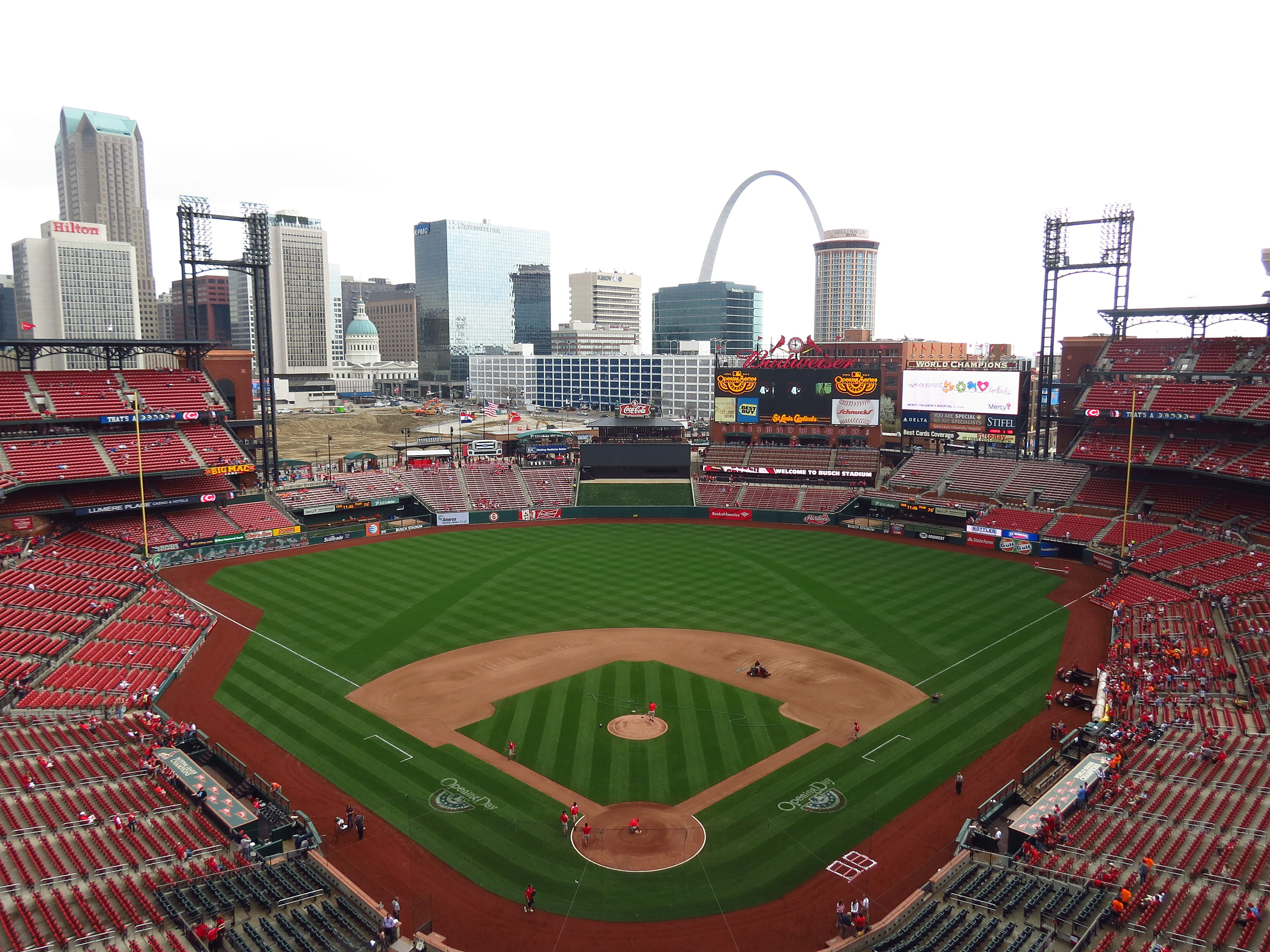
Busch Stadium (III)

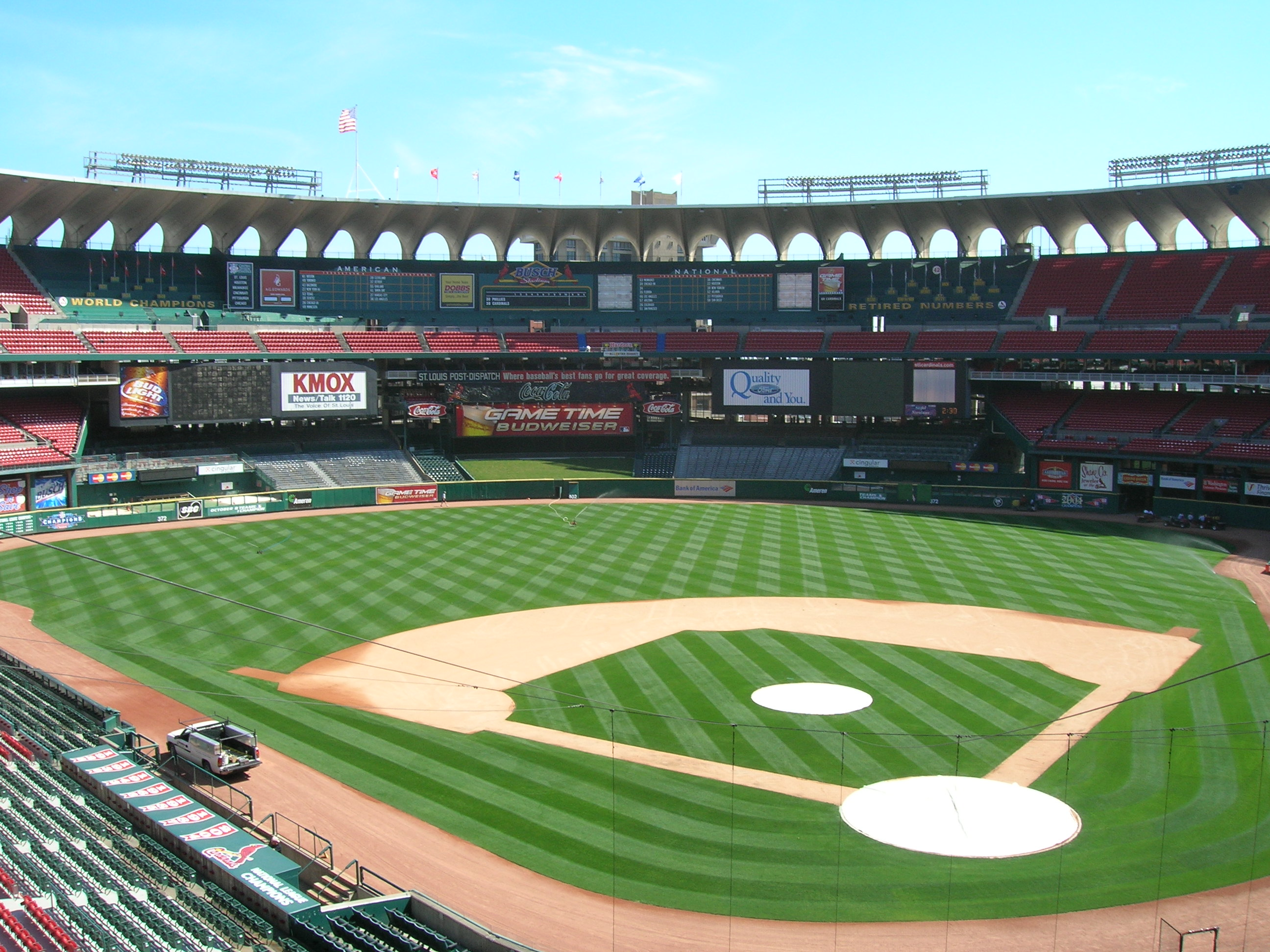
Busch Stadium (II)

Sportsman's Park a.k.a. Busch Stadium (I)

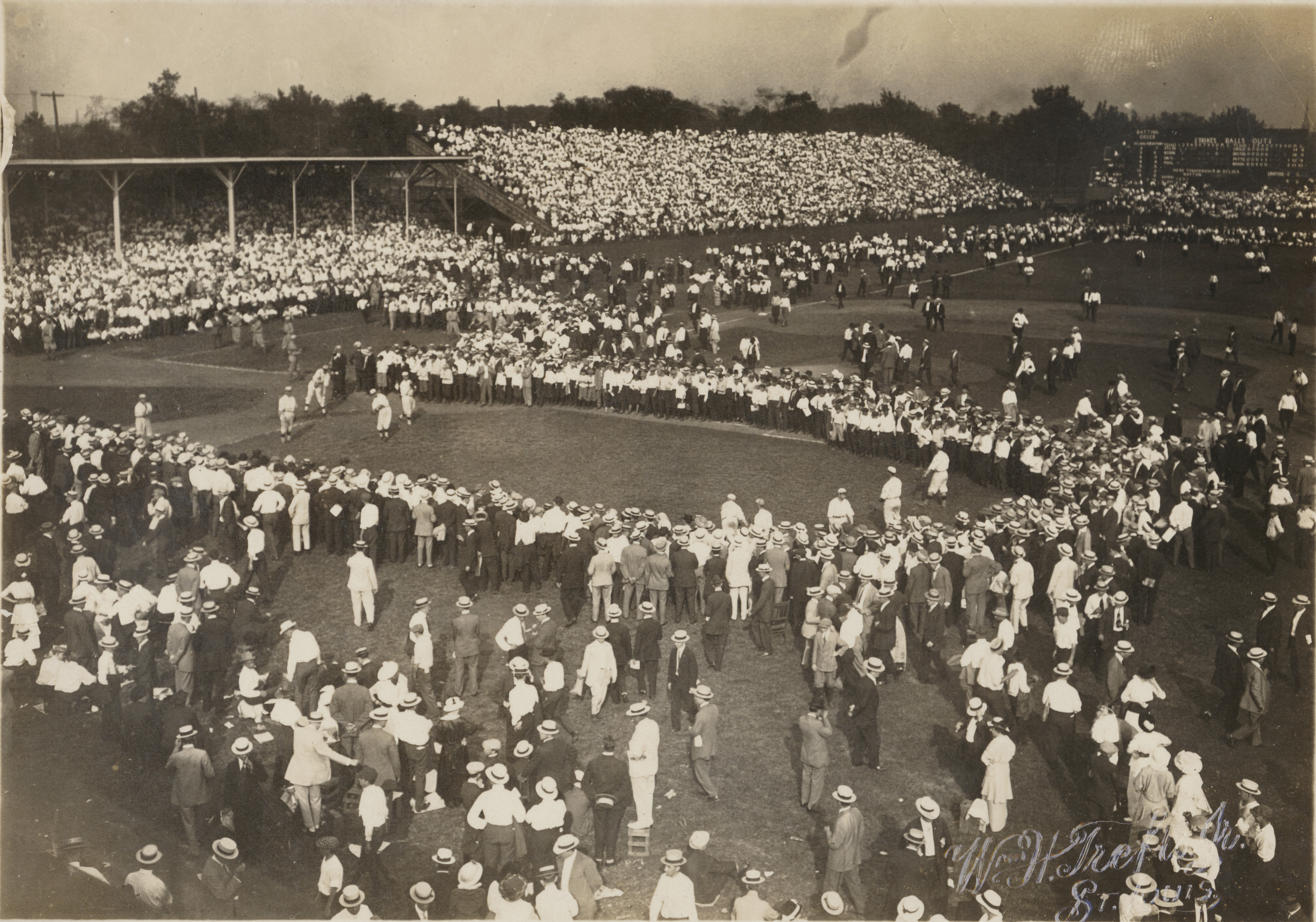
Robison Field

Sportsman's Park
Chronology of names:

St. Louis Base Ball Park, 1868-1874
Grand Avenue Park, 1874-1881
Sportsman's Park, 1881-1893
Old Sportsman's Park, 1893-1898
Athletic Park, 1898-1902
Sportsman's Park, 1902-1953
Busch Stadium (I), 1953-1966
Old Busch Stadium, 1966

Home of:

St. Louis Brown Stockings – National Association (1875) and National League (1876–1877)
St. Louis Browns – American Association (1882–1891) and as St. Louis Cardinals – NL (mid-1920 to mid-1966)
St. Louis Whites – Western Association (1888 part season)
St. Louis Browns – American League (1902–1953)

Location: 2911 North Grand Boulevard (east); 3623 Dodier Street (south), Spring Street (west), Sullivan Avenue (north)

Infield: Southeast corner (originally); Northwest corner (1902); Southwest corner (1909)

Currently: Herbert Hoover Boys' Club

Red Stocking Park later Compton Park or Compton Avenue Park
Home of: St. Louis Reds – National Association (1875)
Location: South Compton Avenue (east, first base); railroad tracks and Chouteau Avenue (south, third base); Edwin Street and Theresa Avenue (west, left field); Spruce Street (north, right field); Scott Avenue and Gratiot Street T-ing into Compton from the east
Currently: MetroLink system repair shops – a few blocks south/southeast of the sites of Handlan's Park and Stars Park

Union Base Ball Park a.k.a. Lucas Park
Home of: St. Louis Maroons – Union Association (1884) / National League (1885–1886)
Location: Jefferson Avenue (west, first base); Howard Street (north, third base); 25th Street (east, left field); Cass Avenue (south, right field)
Currently: part of National Geospatial-Intelligence Agency West Campus

Brotherhood Park
Home of: local St. Louis clubs and guest clubs from Players' League (1890)
Location: Russell Boulevard (north); Missouri Avenue (east); Jefferson Avenue (west)
Currently: residences and Jefferson Animal Hospital

Robison Field a.k.a. New Sportsman's Park, League Park, Cardinal Field
Home of: St. Louis Browns – renamed Cardinals – National League (1892 to mid-1920)
Location: 3852 Natural Bridge Avenue (north, third base); Vandeventer Avenue (west, first base); Prairie Avenue (east, left field); Lexington Avenue (south, right field) – a few blocks north-northwest of Sportsman's Park
Currently: Beaumont High School

St. Louis University Park
Chronology of names:

St. Louis University Park, 1910-1915
High School Field, 1915-1919
Old High School Field, 1919-1922

Opened: 1910
Closed: 1922
Home of:

St. Louis Terriers - Federal League (1913 - classified as independent minor league)

Location: Oakland Avenue, west of Kingshighway Boulevard
Currently: site of St. Louis University High School

Handlan's Park
Chronology of names:

Handlan's Park, 1899-1914
Federal League Park, 1914-1917
Handlan's Park, 1917-1919
High School Field, 1919-1924
St. Louis University Field, 1924-1928
Handlan's Park, 1928-1929

Opened: 1899
Closed: 1929
Home of:

St. Louis Terriers – Federal League (1914–1915)
St. Louis Giants (1920–1921 some games) and St. Louis Stars (1920s some games) – Negro National League

Location: Grand Avenue (west, first base); Laclede Avenue (north, third base); Theresa Avenue (east, left field) (approximates Grand Forest Drive); Clark Avenue (south, right field); Market Street (farther south)
Currently: buildings on campus of St. Louis University, and cut through by Forest Park Avenue ramps to and from I-64

Kuebler's Park or Giants Park (I)
Home of: St. Louis Giants – Negro Leagues (ca.1906–1919)
Location: Prescott Avenue (southwest, first base); Pope Street (northwest, third base); Bulwer Avenue (northeast, left field); Clarence Street (southeast, right field)
Currently: Industrial area

Athletic Park
Home of: St. Louis Giants – Negro Leagues (ca.1910–1913)
Location: North Garrison Ave (west); North Market Street (north); Glasgow Avenue (east); Magazine Street (south)
Currently: nursing home

Giants Park (II) renamed Metropolitan Park ca.1934
Home of:

St. Louis Giants – Negro National League (1920–1921 most games)
St. Louis Stars (II) – Negro American League (1937)

Location: North Broadway (southwest, first base); E Clarence Avenue (northwest, third base); Prescott Avenue (northeast, left field); E Holly Avenue (southeast, right field)
Currently: Industrial area

Stars Park
Home of: St. Louis Stars – Negro National League (mid-1922 to 1931)
Location: 130 South Compton Avenue (west, third base); Laclede Avenue (north, left field); Market Street (south, first base); Cardinal Avenue (east, right field) – a few blocks east from Handlan's Park site and north from Red Stocking Park site
Currently: Baseball field for Harris–Stowe State University

Busch Memorial Stadium
Home of: St. Louis Cardinals – NL (mid-1966 to 2005)
Location: 250 Stadium Plaza (west, third base); Spruce Street (south, first base); Walnut Street (north, left field); Broadway (east, right field)
Currently: Plaza area for the new ballpark

Busch Stadium (III)
Home of: St. Louis Cardinals – NL (2006–present)
Location: 700 Clark Street (north, left field); Broadway (east, right field); Interstate 64 (south, first base); Stadium Plaza / South 8th Street (west, third base); – immediately southwest of Busch Memorial Stadium site (overlapping in left/center field)

== See also ==
- Lists of baseball parks

== Sources ==
- Peter Filichia, Professional Baseball Franchises, Facts on File, 1993.
- Phil Lowry, Green Cathedrals, several editions.
- Michael Benson, Ballparks of North America, McFarland, 1989.
- Joan M. Thomas, St. Louis' Big League Ballparks, Arcadia, 2004.
- Baseball Memories, by Marc Okkonen, Sterling Publishing, 1992.
- The Federal League of 1914–1915, by Marc Okkonen, SABR, 1989.
