= Marcellus Thomas =

American baseball player

- Left fielder
- Born: November 15, 1917; Elaine, Arkansas, U.S.
- Died: November 22, 1982 (aged 65); St. Louis, Missouri, U.S.
- Batted: Unknown Threw: Unknown

Negro league baseball debut
- 1937, for the St. Louis Stars

Last appearance
- 1937, for the St. Louis Stars

Teams
- St. Louis Stars (1937)

Marcellus E. Thomas Jr. (November 15, 1917 - November 22, 1982) was an American professional baseball left fielder in the Negro leagues. He played with the St. Louis Stars in 1937.
