= 1982 Junior League World Series =

Tournament information
- Location: Taylor, Michigan
- Dates: August 17–21

Final positions
- Champions: Tampa, Florida
- Runner-up: Libertyville, Illinois

The 1982 Junior League World Series (then known as the 13 year old Little League World Series) took place from August 17–21 in Taylor, Michigan, United States. Tampa, Florida defeated Libertyville, Illinois in the championship game.

== Teams ==
United States	International
(Illinois) Libertyville, Illinois Central	Vega Baja, Puerto Rico Puerto Rico
(Delaware) Seaford, Delaware East	
(Florida) Tampa, Florida; Belmont Heights; South
(California) Huntington Beach, California; Robinwood; West

== Results ==
Opening Game
—	Puerto Rico	5
—	California	2
Lower round 1
0–1	California	5
0–1	Delaware	4

First Round
1–0	Puerto Rico	3
—	Florida	21
—	Delaware	2
—	Illinois	9
Lower round 2
1–1	Puerto Rico	4
1–1	California	3

Semifinals
1–0	Florida	10
1–0	Illinois	6
Lower final
1–1	Illinois	15
2–1	Puerto Rico	5

World Championship
2–0	Florida	6
2–1	Illinois	1

1982 Junior League World Series Champions
Belmont Heights LL
Tampa, Florida

== Notable players ==
- Gary Sheffield (Tampa, Florida) - former MLB outfielder
- Derek Bell (Tampa, Florida) - former MLB outfielder
- Delino DeShields (Seaford, Delaware) - former MLB infielder
