= Kermit Dial =

American baseball player

- Infielder
- Born: January 10, 1908; Chicago, Illinois, U.S.
- Died: April 14, 1982 (aged 74); Chicago, Illinois, U.S.

Negro league baseball debut
- 1932, for the Chicago American Giants

Last appearance
- 1937, for the Detroit Stars
- Stats at Baseball Reference

Teams
- Chicago American Giants (1932); Columbus Blue Birds (1933); Detroit Stars (1937)

Kermit Nathern Dial (January 10, 1908 – April 14, 1982) was an American Negro League infielder in the 1930s.

A native of Chicago, Illinois, Dial debuted in the Negro Leagues in 1932 with the Chicago American Giants. He played for the Columbus Blue Birds the following season, and finished his career in 1937 with the Detroit Stars. Dial died in Chicago in 1982 at age 74.
