= Jerry Gil =

Dominican baseball player (born 1982)

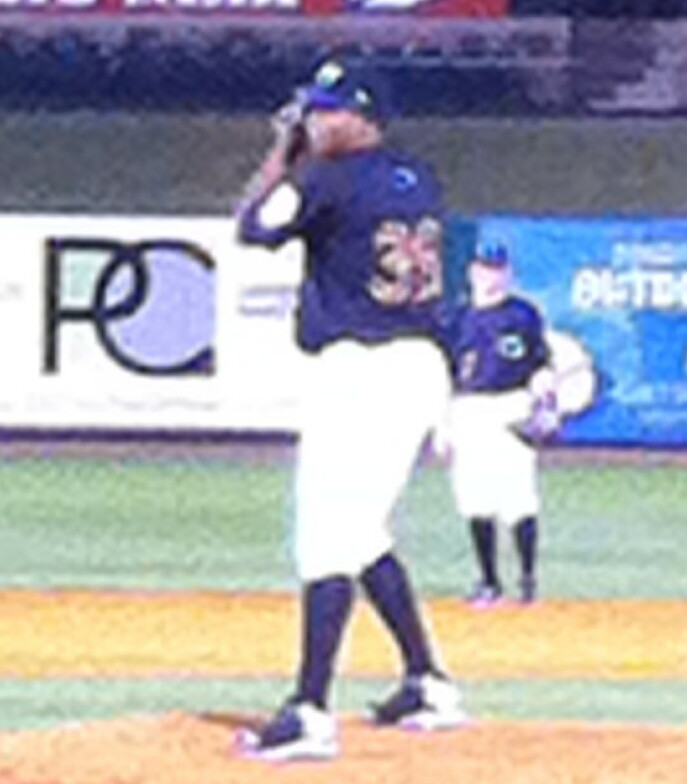
- Gil with the Louisville Bats in 2010

Free agent
- Pitcher
- Born: October 14, 1982 (age 43); San Pedro de Macorís, Dominican Republic
- Bats: Right Throws: Right

MLB debut
- August 22, 2004, for the Arizona Diamondbacks

MLB statistics (through 2010)
- Batting average: .174
- Home runs: 0
- Runs batted in: 8
- Stats at Baseball Reference

Teams
- Arizona Diamondbacks (2004); Cincinnati Reds (2007)

Jerry Bienvenido Gil Manzanillo (born October 14, 1982) is a Dominican professional baseball pitcher. Gil made his MLB debut in 2004 with the Arizona Diamondbacks.

Gil played almost exclusively shortstop in the minor leagues until 2006 when he became a utility player mostly playing in the outfield. On October 13, 2006, Gil was traded from the Diamondbacks to the Cincinnati Reds for Abe Woody. He missed all of 2007 after having elbow ligament replacement surgery. In 2008 after batting below the Mendoza Line in both Triple-A and Double-A, Gil was converted to a pitcher. He has a strong throwing arm and can throw his fastball up to 95 MPH.

In November 2011, Gil signed a minor league contract with the Toronto Blue Jays. According to the International League transactions page, Gil declared free agency on November 2, 2012.

On January 13, 2013, Gil signed a Minor League contract with the Cleveland Indians.
