= Eli Chism =

American baseball player (1916–1982)

- Outfielder
- Born: July 1, 1916; Marianna, Arkansas, U.S.
- Died: April 4, 1982 (aged 65); Kirkwood, Missouri, U.S.
- Batted: Right Threw: Right

Negro league baseball debut
- 1946, for the Cleveland Buckeyes

Last appearance
- 1947, for the Birmingham Black Barons
- Stats at Baseball Reference

Teams
- Cleveland Buckeyes (1946); Birmingham Black Barons (1947)

Elijah "Little" Chism (July 1, 1916 – April 4, 1982) was an American professional baseball outfielder in the Negro leagues. He played with the Cleveland Buckeyes in 1946 and the Birmingham Black Barons in 1947. His brother, John, played in the Negro leagues in 1937, and his statistics are combined with Eli's in some sources.
