= Sug Jones =

American baseball player

- First baseman
- Born: September 9, 1907; Dubach, Louisiana
- Died: July 27, 1982 (aged 74); Jonesboro, Arkansas

Negro league baseball debut
- 1932, for the Little Rock Grays

Last appearance
- 1932, for the Little Rock Grays

Teams
- Little Rock Grays (1932)

Robert Roosevelt Jones (September 9, 1907 – July 27, 1982), nicknamed "Sug", was an American Negro league first baseman in the 1930s.

A native of Dubach, Louisiana, Jones played for the Little Rock Grays in 1932. In 11 recorded games, he posted 16 hits in 45 plate appearances. Jones died in Jonesboro, Arkansas in 1982 at age 74.
