= Norman Cross (baseball) =

American baseball player

- Pitcher
- Born: April 16, 1910; New Orleans, Louisiana, U.S.
- Died: April 25, 1982 (aged 72); Chicago, Illinois, U.S.
- Batted: Left Threw: Right

Negro league baseball debut
- 1932, for the Chicago American Giants

Last appearance
- 1937, for the Chicago American Giants
- Stats at Baseball Reference

Teams
- Chicago American Giants (1932–1933, 1936–1937)

Norman Cross (August 16, 1910 – April 25, 1982) was an American Negro league pitcher in the 1930s.

A native of New Orleans, Louisiana, Cross pitched in several seasons for the Chicago American Giants between 1932 and 1937. He died in Chicago, Illinois in 1982 at age 71.
