= Lunie Danage =

American baseball player

- Second baseman
- Born: June 15, 1895; Pittsburg, Texas, U.S.
- Died: March 17, 1982 (aged 86); Houston, Texas, U.S.
- Batted: Right Threw: Right

Negro league baseball debut
- 1920, for the St. Louis Giants

Last appearance
- 1920, for the St. Louis Giants
- Stats at Baseball Reference

Teams
- St. Louis Giants (1920)

Lunie D. Danage (June 15, 1895 – March 17, 1982) was an American professional baseball second baseman in the Negro leagues. He played with the St. Louis Giants in 1920.
