= St. Louis Stars (1936–1937) =

American professional baseball team

St. Louis Stars (II)

Information
- League: Negro American League (1937)
- Location: St. Louis, Missouri
- Ballpark: Metropolitan Park (1936-1937)
- Established: 1936
- Disbanded: 1937

The St. Louis Stars were a major Negro league baseball team. The team formed in 1936 as an independent club before joining the Negro American League for one season in 1937. They were a charter member of the NAL, but the team disbanded prior to the 1938 season due to financial difficulties. This was an entirely different organization from the original St. Louis Stars.

This version of the Stars played their home games at Metropolitan Park.
