= Senior League World Series (Host Team) =

The Senior League World Series Host team is one of six United States regions that currently sends teams to the World Series in Easley, South Carolina. The Host team first competed in the SLWS in 1961.

== Host Teams at the Senior League World Series ==
As of the 2026 Senior League World Series.

Year	City	SLWS	Record
1961	South Williamsport, Pennsylvania	Round 2	1–1
1962–1966	Inactive		
1967	Des Moines, Iowa	Runner-up	4–2
1968	Indiana State Champion	Round 2	0–2
1969	Indiana State Champion	Runner-up	3–2
1970	Indiana State Champion	Fourth Place	2–2
1971	Indiana State Champion	Round 1	0–2
1972	Indiana State Champion	Round 4	2–2
1973	Indiana State Champion	Round 2	0–2
1974–1989	Inactive		
1990	Florida – District 3 Champion	Round 3	3–3
1991	Florida – District 3 Champion	Fourth Place	3–3
1992	Florida – District 3 Champion	Round 2	2–3
1993	Florida – District 3 Champion	Round 2	2–3
1994	Florida – District 3 Champion	Round 3	3–3
1995	Florida – District 3 Champion	Fourth Place	3–3
1996	Florida – District 3 Champion	Round 2	1–3
1997	Florida – District 3 Champion	Third Place	4–2
1998	Florida – District 3 Champion	Runner-up	4–2
1999	Florida – District 3 Champion	Champions	5–0
2000	Florida – District 3 Champion	Fourth Place	4–3
2001	Florida – District 3 Champion	Round 3	2–3
2002	Maine – District 3 Champion	Pool stage	1–3
2003	Maine – District 3 Champion	Pool stage	1–3
2004	Maine – District 3 Champion	Pool stage	0–4
2005	Maine – District 3 Champion	Pool stage	1–3
2006	Maine – District 3 Champion	Pool stage	1–3
2007	Maine – District 3 Champion	Pool stage	0–4
2008	Maine – District 3 Champion	Pool stage	1–3
2009	Maine – District 3 Champion	Pool stage	1–3
2010	Maine – District 3 Champion	Runner-up	4–2
2011	Maine – District 3 Champion	Pool stage	1–3
2012	Maine – District 3 Champion	Pool stage	1–2
2013	Maine – District 3 Champion	Pool stage	1–3
2014	Maine – District 3 Champion	Semifinals	4–1
2015	Maine – District 3 Champion	Semifinals	2–2
2016	Maine – District 3 Champion	Semifinals	2–1
2017	South Carolina – District 1 Champion	Round 2	1–2
2018	South Carolina – District 1 Champion	Round 3	2–2
2019	South Carolina – District 1 Champion	US Final	3–2
2020	Cancelled due to COVID-19 pandemic		
2021	Cancelled due to COVID-19 pandemic		
2022	South Carolina – District 1 Champion	Round 2	2–2
2023	South Carolina – District 1 Champion	Round 3	2–2
2024	South Carolina – District 1 Champion	Round 3	3–2
2025	South Carolina – District 1 Champion	Runner-up	5–2
2026	South Carolina – District 1 Champion	Round 2	2–2

== Results by Host ==
As of the 2026 Senior League World Series.

Host	SLWS Hosted	SLWS Championships	W–L	PCT
Maine – District 3 Champion	15	0	21–40	.344
Florida – District 3 Champion	12	1	36–31	.537
South Carolina – District 1 Champion	8	0	20–16	.556
Indiana State Champion	6	0	7–12	.368
Des Moines, Iowa	1	0	4–2	.667
South Williamsport, Pennsylvania	1	0	1–1	.500
Total	43	1	89–102	.466

== See also ==
- Host Teams in other Little League divisions:
  - Intermediate League
  - Junior League
  - Big League
