= 2019 Senior League World Series =

American youth baseball tournament

Tournament details
- Country: United States
- City: Easley, South Carolina
- Dates: 27 July – 3 August 2019
- Teams: 12

Final positions
- Champions: Wailuku, Hawaii
- Runner-up: Willemstad, Curaçao

The 2019 Senior League World Series took place from July 27–August 3 in Easley, South Carolina. Wailuku, Hawaii defeated Willemstad, Curaçao in the championship game.

== Teams ==
| United States | International |
|---|---|
| (South Carolina) Easley/Piedmont, South Carolina; District 1 Host | Auckland, New Zealand; Auckland Baseball Association; Asia–Pacific |
| (Wisconsin) Madison, Wisconsin; West Madison; Central | (New South Wales) Perth, Western Australia; Swan Hills; Australia |
| Wilmington, Delaware; Naamans; East | Mirabel, Quebec; Diamond Baseball; Canada |
| Onancock, Virginia; Central Accomack; Southeast | (Curaçao) Willemstad, Curaçao; Pariba; Caribbean |
| (Texas) Houston, East Texas; West University; Southwest | Bologna, Italy; Emilia Romagna; Europe–Africa |
| (Hawaii) Wailuku, Hawaii; Central East Maui; West | Herrera, Panama; Chitre; Latin America |

== Results ==
United States Bracket

Upper round 1
— | Virginia | 4
— | Hawaii | 12
— | Delaware | 9
— | South Carolina | 8
Lower round 1
0–1 | Wisconsin | 2
0–1 | South Carolina | 7
0–1 | Virginia | 6
1–1 | Delaware | 1

Upper round 2
1–0 | Hawaii (F/6) | 14
— | Wisconsin | 1
1–0 | Delaware | 2
— | Texas | 4
Lower round 2
1–1 | South Carolina | 5
1–1 | Virginia | 1

Upper final
2–0 | Hawaii (F/5) | 11
1–0 | Texas | 0
Lower final
1–1 | Texas | 1
2–1 | South Carolina | 7

United States Championship
3–0 | Hawaii (F/6) | 10
3–1 | South Carolina | 0

International Bracket

Upper round 1
— | Curaçao (F/5) | 12
— | Italy | 0
— | Australia | 10
— | Canada | 6
Lower round 1
0–1 | New Zealand | 7
0–1 | Canada | 9
0–1 | Italy | 7
1–1 | Australia | 1

Upper round 2
1–0 | Curaçao | 11
— | New Zealand | 6
1–0 | Australia | 1
— | Panama | 6
Lower round 2
1–1 | Canada | 1
1–1 | Italy | 5

Upper final
2–0 | Curaçao | 2
1–0 | Panama | 4
Lower final
2–1 | Curaçao (F/5) | 10
2–1 | Italy | 0

International Championship
2–0 | Panama | 1
3–1 | Curaçao | 8

Consolation Round

| — |
| 1–2 | Delaware | 0 |
| 1–2 | Australia (F/4) | 7 |

| — |
| 0–2 | Wisconsin (F/3) | 2 |
| 0–2 | New Zealand | 1 |

World Championship

| World Championship |
| 4–0 | Hawaii (F/6) | 11 |
| 4–1 | Curaçao | 0 |

2019 Senior League World Series Champions
Central East Maui LL
Wailuku, Hawaii
