= 2003 Senior League World Series =

American youth baseball tournament

Tournament information
- Location: Bangor, Maine
- Dates: August 10–16, 2003

Final positions
- Champions: Hilo, Hawaii
- Runner-up: Chesterfield, Virginia

The 2003 Senior League World Series took place from August 10–16 in Bangor, Maine, United States. Hilo, Hawaii defeated Chesterfield, Virginia in the championship game.

== Teams ==
| United States | International |
|---|---|
| (Maine) Orono, Maine; District 3 Host | (Guam) Hagåtña, Guam; Central; Asia–Pacific |
| Urbandale, Iowa; Urbandale; Central | (Alberta) Calgary, Alberta; Centennial; Canada |
| Vineland, New Jersey; South Vineland; East | Moscow, Russia; Khovimo; Europe |
| (Virginia) Chesterfield, Virginia; Central Chesterfield; Southeast | Willemstad, Curaçao; Pabao; Latin America |
| (Texas) Brenham, Texas; Washington County; Southwest | |
(Hawaii) Hilo, Hawaii; Hilo; West

== Results ==
Group A

| Team | W | L | Rs | Ra |
|---|---|---|---|---|
| Virginia | 3 | 1 | 23 | 7 |
| Hawaii | 3 | 1 | 23 | 15 |
| Russia | 2 | 2 | 15 | 17 |
| Maine | 1 | 3 | 13 | 27 |
| Canada | 1 | 3 | 9 | 17 |

| | (Canada) | (Hawaii) | (Maine) | (Russia) | (Virginia) |
|---|---|---|---|---|---|
| Canada | – | 1–8 | 4–5 | 1–4 | 3–0 |
| Hawaii | 8–1 | – | 8–6 | 5–0 | 2–8 |
| Maine | 5–4 | 6–8 | – | 1–10 | 1–5 |
| Russia | 4–1 | 0–5 | 10–1 | – | 1–10 |
| Virginia | 0–3 | 8–2 | 5–1 | 10–1 | – |

Group B

| Team | W | L | Rs | Ra |
|---|---|---|---|---|
| Curaçao | 4 | 0 | 32 | 9 |
| Iowa | 2 | 2 | 19 | 19 |
| New Jersey | 2 | 2 | 37 | 21 |
| Texas | 2 | 2 | 22 | 13 |
| Guam | 0 | 4 | 5 | 43 |

| | (Curaçao) | (Guam) | (Iowa) | (New Jersey) | (Texas) |
|---|---|---|---|---|---|
| Curaçao | – | 11–0 | 4–3^{(8)} | 7–6^{(8)} | 10–0 |
| Guam | 0–11 | – | 2–6 | 3–13 | 0–13 |
| Iowa | 3–4^{(8)} | 6–2 | – | 8–7 | 2–6 |
| New Jersey | 6–7^{(8)} | 13–3 | 7–8 | – | 11–3 |
| Texas | 0–10 | 13–0 | 6–2 | 3–11 | – |

Elimination Round

Semifinals
3–1 | Virginia | 6
2–2 | Iowa | 3
4–0 | Curaçao | 2
3–1 | Hawaii | 3

World Championship
4–1 | Virginia | 8
4–1 | Hawaii | 16

2003 Senior League World Series Champions
Hilo LL
Hilo, Hawaii
