= Senior League World Series (Caribbean Region) =

Caribbean Region
- Most recent season or competition: 2026 Senior League World Series
- Sport: Baseball
- Founded: 2017
- Most recent champion: Willemstad, Curaçao
- Most titles: Curaçao (4)

The Senior League World Series Caribbean Region is one of six International regions that currently sends teams to the World Series in Easley, South Carolina. The region's participation in the SLWS dates back to 2017. The region was the result of the Latin America region splitting in two.

== Caribbean Region Countries ==
- Aruba
- British Virgin Islands
- Curaçao
- Dominican Republic
- Puerto Rico
- Sint Maarten
- U.S. Virgin Islands

== Region Champions ==
As of the 2026 Senior League World Series.

Year	City	SLWS	Record
2017	Caguas, Puerto Rico	Int'l Final	3–1
2018	Willemstad, Curaçao	Champions	4–0
2019	Willemstad, Curaçao	Runner-up	4–2
2020	Cancelled due to COVID-19 pandemic		
2021	Cancelled due to COVID-19 pandemic		
2022	Guayama, Puerto Rico	Champions	5–0
2023	Willemstad, Curaçao	Champions	4–0
2024	Oranjestad, Aruba	Round 1	0–2
2025	Guaynabo, Puerto Rico	Champions	5–0
2026	Willemstad, Curaçao	Runner-up	4–2

=== Results by Country ===
As of the 2026 Senior League World Series.

Country	Region Championships	SLWS Championships	W–L	PCT
Curaçao	4	2	16–4	.800
Puerto Rico	3	2	13–1	.929
Aruba	1	0	0–2	.000
Total	8	4	29–7	.806

== See also ==
- Senior League World Series (Latin America Region)

Caribbean Region in other Little League divisions

- Little League – Latin America
- Little League – Caribbean
- Little League – Mexico
- Intermediate League
- Junior League
- Big League
