= 1979 Senior League World Series =

American youth baseball tournament

Tournament information
- Location: Gary, Indiana
- Dates: August 14–19, 1979

Final positions
- Champions: Taichung, Taiwan
- Runner-up: Tampa, Florida

The 1979 Senior League World Series took place from August 14–19 in Gary, Indiana, United States. Taichung, Taiwan defeated Tampa, Florida twice in the championship game. It was Taiwan's eighth straight championship.

== Teams ==
| United States | International |
|---|---|
| (Maine) Auburn, Maine East | Lethbridge, Alberta Canada |
| (Michigan) Taylor, Michigan North | (West Germany) Bitburg, West Germany Europe |
| (Florida) Tampa, Florida South | (Taiwan) Taichung, Taiwan; Tung–Feng; Far East |
| (California) Northridge, California West | Curaçao, Netherlands Antilles Latin America |

== Results ==
Upper round 1 | Upper round 2 | Upper final | World Championship
— | Florida | 7
— | Canada | 3
1–0 | Florida | 7
1–0 | Taiwan | 3
— | Taiwan | 3
— | California | 2
2–0 | Florida | 4
2–0 | Maine | 1
— | West Germany | 2
— | Maine | 23
1–0 | Maine | 14
1–0 | Michigan | 4
— | Netherlands Antilles | 1
— | Michigan | 7 | 3–0 | Florida | 3 | 0
4–1 | Taiwan | 4 | 5
Lower round 1 | Lower round 2 | Lower round 3 | Lower final
1–1 | Michigan | 3
0–1 | California | 16 | 1–1 | California | 2 | 2–1 | Maine | 1
0–1 | Canada | 3 | 2–1 | Michigan | 1 | 3–1 | Taiwan | 6
2–1 | Taiwan | 3
1–1 | Taiwan | 3
0–1 | West Germany | 0 | 1–1 | Netherlands Antilles | 1
0–1 | Netherlands Antilles | 7

1979 Senior League World Series Champions
Tung–Feng LL
Taichung, Taiwan
