= 2017 Senior League World Series =

American youth baseball tournament

Tournament information
- Location: Easley, South Carolina
- Dates: July 29–August 5, 2017

Final positions
- Champions: Aguadulce, Panama
- Runner-up: Coral Springs, Florida

The 2017 Senior League World Series took place from July 29–August 5 in Easley, South Carolina, United States. Aguadulce, Panama defeated Coral Springs, Florida in the championship game. This was the first SLWS held in Easley.

The debut of the Australia and Caribbean regions created a change in format. For the first time ever, teams were placed into two geographic-based brackets (U.S. and International).

== Teams ==
United States	International
(South Carolina) Easley, South Carolina; District 1 Host	Makati, Philippines; Illam Central; Asia–Pacific
(Ohio) Holmes County, Ohio; East Holmes; Central	(South Australia) Adelaide, South Australia; Southern Adelaide; Australia
(New Jersey) West Deptford Township, New Jersey; West Deptford Township; East	(British Columbia) Surrey, British Columbia; Whalley/Langley/Coquitlam; Canada
(Florida) Coral Springs, Florida; North Springs; Southeast	(Puerto Rico) Caguas, Puerto Rico; Villa Blanca Boys and Girls; Caribbean
(Texas) Houston, Texas; West University; Southwest	Emilia, Italy; Emilia/Romagna; Europe–Africa
(Hawaii) Wailuku, Hawaii; Central East Maui; West	(Panama) Aguadulce, Panama; Aguadulce Cabezera; Latin America

== Results ==
United States Bracket

—
—	New Jersey	4
—	Florida	5
—	South Carolina	1
—	Texas	4
Lower round 1
0–1	New Jersey	7
1–1	Texas (F/8)	8
0–1	Ohio	0
0–1	South Carolina	8

—
1–0	Florida (F/6)	19
—	Ohio	9
1–0	Texas	5
—	Hawaii	6
Lower round 2
2–1	Texas	4
1–1	South Carolina	3

—
2–0	Florida (F/9)	1
1–0	Hawaii	0
Lower final
1–1	Hawaii	2
3–1	Texas	1

United States Championship
3–0	Florida (F/5)	12
2–1	Hawaii	2

International Bracket

—
—	Australia	2
—	Puerto Rico	3
—	Canada	0
—	Philippines (F/5)	10
Lower round 1
0–1	Australia	3
1–1	Philippines	0
0–1	Italy (F/5)	12
0–1	Canada	0

—
1–0	Puerto Rico (F/6)	12
—	Italy	2
1–0	Philippines	0
—	Panama (F/5)	10
Lower round 2
1–1	Australia	1
1–1	Italy	0

—
2–0	Puerto Rico	2
1–0	Panama	0
Lower final
1–1	Panama	10
2–1	Australia	4

International Championship
3–0	Puerto Rico	1
2–1	Panama (F/13)	2

Consolation round

—
0–2	Ohio (F/5)	14
1–2	Philippines	0

—
0–2	New Jersey	7
0–2	Canada	2

Elimination Round

Semifinals
3–0	Florida (F/5)	12
2–1	Hawaii	2
3–0	Puerto Rico	1
2–1	Panama (F/13)	2

World Championship
4–0	Florida	4
3–1	Panama	5

2017 Senior League World Series Champions
Aguadulce Cabezera LL
Aguadulce, Panama
