= 1986 Senior League World Series =

American youth baseball tournament

Tournament information
- Location: Kissimmee, Florida
- Dates: August 11–16, 1986

Final positions
- Champions: Taipei, Taiwan
- Runner-up: Brenham, Texas

The 1986 Senior League World Series took place from August 11–16 in Kissimmee, Florida, United States. Taipei, Taiwan defeated Brenham, Texas in the championship game. This was the first SLWS held in Kissimmee.

== Teams ==
United States	International
(Pennsylvania) DuBois, Pennsylvania East	Vancouver, British Columbia, Canada Canada
(Michigan) Midland, Michigan North	(Belgium) Brussels, Belgium Europe
(Texas) Brenham, Texas South	(Taiwan) Taipei, Taiwan Far East
(Nevada) Las Vegas, Nevada West	Panama City, Panama Latin America

== Results ==
Upper round 1	Upper round 2	Upper final	World Championship
–	Michigan	16
–	Belgium	6
1–0	Michigan	1
1–0	Texas	15
–	Texas (F/8)	9
–	Pennsylvania	8
2–0	Texas	1
2–0	Taiwan	3
–	Panama	0
–	Taiwan	9
1–0	Taiwan	15
1–0	Nevada	5
–	Canada	0
–	Nevada	15	3–0	Taiwan	5	—
3–1	Texas	3	—
Lower round 1	Lower round 2	Lower round 3	Lower final
1–1	Nevada	9
0–1	Belgium	0	1–1	Pennsylvania	10	2–1	Texas	6
0–1	Pennsylvania	8	2–1	Pennsylvania	6	3–1	Panama	2
2–1	Panama (F/10)	7
1–1	Michigan	0
0–1	Panama	9	1–1	Panama	9
0–1	Canada	7

1986 Senior League World Series Champions
Taipei, Taiwan
