= 1970 Senior League World Series =

American youth baseball tournament

Tournament information
- Location: Gary, Indiana
- Dates: August 17–23, 1970

Final positions
- Champions: West Tampa, Florida
- Runner-up: (New York (state)) Throggs Neck, New York

The 1970 Senior League World Series took place from August 17–23 in Gary, Indiana, United States. West Tampa, Florida defeated Throggs Neck, New York in the championship game.

This year featured the debut of a team from Puerto Rico.

== Teams ==
United States	International
(Indiana) Gary, Indiana; Junedale; Host	Windsor, Ontario Canada
(New York (state)) Throggs Neck, New York East	(Belgium) Brussels, Belgium Europe
(Ohio) Painesville, Ohio North	Monterrey, Mexico Mexico
(Florida) West Tampa, Florida South	Caguas, Puerto Rico Puerto Rico
(California) Santa Ana, California West	

== Results ==
Winner's Bracket

Opening Game
—	Puerto Rico	1
—	Mexico	2

First Round
1–0	Mexico	0
—	Canada	4
—	(New York (state)) New York	4
—	Indiana	3
—	California (F/8)	3
—	Belgium	2
—	Ohio	0
—	Florida	15

—
1–0	Canada	3
1–0	(New York (state)) New York	6
1–0	California	1
1–0	Florida	3

Bracket Final
2–0	(New York (state)) New York	4
2–0	Florida	11

Loser's Bracket

—
1
0–1	Puerto Rico	1
2
7
3
6
1–1	Mexico	7
5

—
0–1	Indiana	6
2–1	Mexico	1
0–1	Belgium	1
0–1	Ohio	12

—
1–1	Canada	5
1–1	Indiana	6
1–1	California	1
1–1	Ohio	2

Bracket Semifinal
2–1	Indiana
2–1	Ohio

Elimination Round

Semifinals
2–0	(New York (state)) New York	4
2–0	Florida	11
2–1	(New York (state)) New York	5
3–1	Ohio	2

World Championship
3–0	Florida	2
3–1	(New York (state)) New York	1

1970 Senior League World Series Champions
West Tampa, Florida
