= 1967 Senior League World Series =

American youth baseball tournament

Tournament information
- Location: Des Moines, Iowa
- Dates: August 14–17, 1967

Final positions
- Champions: (New York (state)) Westbury, New York
- Runner-up: West Des Moines, Iowa

The 1967 Senior League World Series took place from August 14–17 in Des Moines, Iowa, United States. Westbury, New York defeated West Des Moines, Iowa in the championship game. It was New York's second straight championship. This was the final SLWS held in Des Moines.

This year featured the debut of a double-elimination format, as well as the re-introduction of a host team.

== Teams ==
United States	International
(Iowa) West Des Moines, Iowa Host	Fort William, Ontario Canada
(New York (state)) Westbury, New York East	Matamoros, Mexico Mexico
(Wisconsin) Madison, Wisconsin; West Madison; North	
(Texas) Houston, Texas; Edgewood American; South
(California) North Hollywood, California West

== Results ==
Upper round 1	Upper round 2	Upper final	World Championship
—	California (F/5)	16
—	Mexico	1
1–0	California	1
1–0	(New York (state)) New York	3
—	(New York (state)) New York (F/5)	16
—	Canada	1
2–0	(New York (state)) New York	5
1–0	Wisconsin	4
—	Texas	1
—	Iowa	8
1–0	Iowa	2
—	Wisconsin	3
3–0	(New York (state)) New York	11	—
4–1	Iowa	3	—
Lower round 1	Lower round 2	Lower round 3	Lower final
1–1	Iowa	3
0–1	Mexico	0	1–1	Canada	1	1–1	Wisconsin	0
0–1	Canada	2	2–1	Iowa	5	3–1	Iowa	4
2–1	California	2
1–1	California	6
0–1	Texas	5

1967 Senior League World Series Champions
Westbury, New York
