= Senior League World Series (East Region) =

East Region
- Most recent season or competition: 2026 Senior League World Series
- Sport: Baseball
- Founded: 1962
- No. of teams: 12
- Country: United States
- Most recent champion: Newark, Delaware
- Most titles: New Jersey (18)

The Senior League World Series East Region is one of six United States regions that currently sends teams to the World Series in Easley, South Carolina. The region's participation in the SLWS dates back to 1962.

== East Region States ==
- Connecticut
- Delaware
- Maine
- Maryland
- Massachusetts
- New Hampshire
- New Jersey
- New York
- Pennsylvania
- Rhode Island
- Vermont
- Washington, D.C.

== Region Champions ==
As of the 2026 Senior League World Series.

Year	City	SLWS	Record
1962	(New York (state)) West Hempstead, New York	Champions	2–0
1963	Pompton Lakes, New Jersey	Fourth Place	0–2
1964	(New York (state)) Massapequa, New York	Champions	3–0
1965	Norwich, Connecticut	Third Place	1–1
1966	(New York (state)) East Rochester, New York	Champions	3–0
1967	(New York (state)) Westbury, New York	Champions	4–0
1968	(New York (state)) New Hyde Park, New York	Champions	4–0
1969	(New York (state)) Oceanside, New York	Third Place	3–2
1970	(New York (state)) Throggs Neck, New York	Runner-up	3–2
1971	Pequannock Township, New Jersey	Third Place	2–2
1972	Council Rock, Pennsylvania	Third Place	3–2
1973	Oxon Hill, Maryland	Runner-up	3–2
1974	Berwick, Pennsylvania	Round 2	1–2
1975	(New York (state)) Massapequa, New York	Round 1	0–2
1976	New Castle, Delaware	Round 2	1–2
1977	(New York (state)) Sayville, New York	Round 2	1–2
1978	(New York (state)) Queens Village, New York	Round 2	1–2
1979	Auburn, Maine	Third Place	2–2
1980	Berwick, Pennsylvania	Fourth Place	2–2
1981	Georgetown, Delaware	Champions	4–0
1982	(New York (state)) Staten Island, New York	Round 2	1–2
1983	Seaford, Delaware	Third Place	3–2
1984	Seaford, Delaware	Round 2	1–2
1985	Salem, New Hampshire	Round 2	1–2
1986	DuBois, Pennsylvania	Fourth Place	2–2
1987	East Greenwich, Rhode Island	Round 1	0–2
1988	Waldorf, Maryland	Round 1	0–2
1989	(New York (state)) Haverstraw, New York	Third Place	2–2
1990	Montoursville, Pennsylvania	Fourth Place	2–3
1991	Newark, New Jersey	Round 2	1–3
1992	Asbury Park, New Jersey	Round 2	1–3
1993	Shippensburg, Pennsylvania	Round 3	3–3
1994	Ringwood, New Jersey	Round 2	0–3
1995	(New York (state)) Haverstraw, New York	Round 2	1–3
1996	Midway, Delaware	Third Place	4–2
1997	Lewisburg, Pennsylvania	Fourth Place	3–3
1998	Wilmington, Delaware	Round 3	2–3
1999	Franklin, Pennsylvania	Round 2	1–2
2000	Newark, Delaware	Third Place	4–2
2001	Vineland, New Jersey	Round 3	2–3
2002	Vineland, New Jersey	Pool stage	2–2
2003	Vineland, New Jersey	Pool stage	2–2
2004	Freehold Township, New Jersey	Champions	5–1
2005	Freehold Township, New Jersey	Semifinals	3–2
2006	Bloomfield, New Jersey	Semifinals	3–2
2007	Freehold Township, New Jersey	Pool stage	2–2
2008	Upper Deerfield, New Jersey	Champions	6–0
2009	Vineland, New Jersey	Pool stage	2–2
2010	Vineland, New Jersey	Semifinals	4–1
2011	Talbot County, Maryland	Pool stage	2–2
2012	Auburn, Massachusetts	Pool stage	2–2
2013	Kennett Square, Pennsylvania	Runner-up	4–2
2014	Bristol, Connecticut	Pool stage	1–3
2015	Upper Moreland, Pennsylvania	Semifinals	2–1
2016	Clifton, New Jersey	Round 1	1–2
2017	West Deptford Township, New Jersey (Host)	Round 1	1–2
2018	Wilmington, Delaware	Runner-up	3–1
2019	Wilmington, Delaware	Round 1	1–3
2020	Cancelled due to COVID-19 pandemic		
2021	Cancelled due to COVID-19 pandemic		
2022	Vineland, New Jersey	Round 3	2–2
2023	Cherry Hill, New Jersey	Runner-up	3–1
2024	Auburn, Massachusetts	Round 1	0–2
2025	Dubois, Pennsylvania	Round 1	0–2
2026	Newark, Delaware	US Final	2–1

=== Results by State ===
As of the 2026 Senior League World Series.

State	Region Championships	SLWS Championships	W–L	PCT
New Jersey	18	2	41–35	.539
(New York (state)) New York	13	5	28–17	.622
Pennsylvania	11	0	23–24	.489
Delaware	10	1	25–18	.581
Maryland	3	0	5–6	.455
Connecticut	2	0	2–4	.333
Massachusetts	2	0	2–4	.333
Maine	1	0	2–2	.500
New Hampshire	1	0	1–2	.333
(New Jersey) Host Team(s)	1	0	1–2	.333
Rhode Island	1	0	0–2	.000
Total	63	8	130–116	.528

== See also ==
East Region in other Little League divisions

- Little League – East 1957-2000
  - Little League – Mid-Atlantic
  - Little League – New England
- Intermediate League
- Junior League
- Big League
