= 2014 Senior League World Series =

American youth baseball tournament

Tournament information
- Location: Bangor, Maine
- Dates: August 10–16, 2014

Final positions
- Champions: Houston, Texas
- Runner-up: Willemstad, Curaçao

The 2014 Senior League World Series took place from August 10–16 in Bangor, Maine, United States. Houston, Texas defeated Willemstad, Curaçao in the championship game.

== Teams ==
United States	International
(Maine) Bangor, Maine; District 3 Host	(Northern Mariana Islands) Saipan, Northern Mariana Islands; Saipan; Asia–Pacific
(Michigan) Grand Rapids, Michigan; Western; Central	(Saskatchewan) Regina, Saskatchewan; Kiwanis National/North Regina; Canada
(Connecticut) Bristol, Connecticut; Edgewood; East	(Italy) Emilia, Italy; Emilia; Europe–Africa
(Virginia) Dumfries, Virginia; Dumfries; Southeast	(Curaçao) Willemstad, Curaçao; Pariba; Latin America
(Texas) Houston, Texas; West University; Southwest	
(Hawaii) Wailuku, Hawaii; Central East Maui; West

== Results ==
Group A

Team	W	L	Rs	Ra
Maine	4	0	30	9
Virginia	3	1	27	9
Hawaii	2	2	23	8
Canada	1	3	8	33
Northern Mariana Islands	0	4	9	38

	(Canada)	(Hawaii)	(Maine)	(Northern Mariana Islands)	(Virginia)
Canada	–	0–11	2–7	6–5^{(13)}	0–10
Hawaii	11–0	–	1–3	10–0	1–5
Maine	7–2	3–1	–	13–3	7–3
Northern Mariana Islands	5–6^{(13)}	0–10	3–13	–	1–9
Virginia	10–0	5–1	3–7	9–1	–

Group B

Team	W	L	Rs	Ra
Curaçao	4	0	36	7
Texas	3	1	29	7
Michigan	1	3	5	14
Connecticut	1	3	2	26
Italy	1	3	8	26

	(Connecticut)	(Curaçao)	(Italy)	(Michigan)	(Texas)
Connecticut	–	1–11	1–0^{(8)}	0–5	0–10
Curaçao	11–1	–	14–4	7–0	4–2
Italy	0–1^{(8)}	4–14	–	1–0	3–11
Michigan	5–0	0–7	0–1	–	0–6
Texas	10–0	2–4	11–3	6–0	–

Elimination Round

Semifinals
4–0	Maine	0
3–1	Texas	7
4–0	Curaçao	3
3–1	Virginia	2

World Championship
4–1	Texas	7
5–0	Curaçao	4

2014 Senior League World Series Champions
West University LL
Houston, Texas
