= Senior League World Series (Australia Region) =

Australia Region
- Most recent season or competition: 2026 Senior League World Series
- Sport: Baseball
- Founded: 2017
- Most recent champions: Brisbane, Queensland
- Most titles: Western Australia (3)

The Senior League World Series Australia Region is one of six International regions that currently sends teams to the World Series in Easley, South Carolina. The region's participation in the SLWS dates back to 2017.

== Australia Region States ==
- Australian Capital Territory
- New South Wales
- Queensland
- South Australia
- Victoria
- Western Australia

== Region Champions ==
As of the 2026 Senior League World Series.

Year	City	SLWS	Record
2017	Adelaide, South Australia	Round 3	2–2
2018	Sydney, New South Wales	Round 1	0–2
2019	Perth, Western Australia	Round 1	2–2
2020	Cancelled due to COVID-19 pandemic		
2021	Cancelled due to COVID-19 pandemic		
2022	(Victoria (state)) Melbourne, Victoria	Round 3	2–2
2023	(Victoria (state)) Sydney, New South Wales	Round 3	1–2
2024	Perth, Western Australia	Round 3	2–2
2025	Perth, Western Australia	Int'l Final	4–2
2026	Brisbane, Queensland	Round 1	0–2

== Australian National Championship - Championship games ==
- This table includes championship games contested prior to Australia's automatic berth into the Little League World Series.

Year	Host	Winner	Score	Runner-up
2016	Lismore	Southern Mariners (Victoria)	6–1	Hills
2017	Lismore	Adelaide Armada (South Australia)	4–0	Hills
2018	Lismore	Cronulla (New South Wales)	7–3	Adelaide Titans
2019	Lismore	Western Suns (Western Australia)	6–4	Brisbane Metro
2020	Not held due to COVID-19 pandemic			
2021*	Lismore	Southern Mariners (Victoria)	8–7	Macarthur
2022	Geelong	Eastern Athletics (Victoria)	10–0	Cronulla
2023	Mandurah	Ryde Hawks (New South Wales)	6–4	Eastern Phantoms

* Due to the continued impact of the COVID-19 pandemic no international teams traveled to Easley in 2021.

=== Results by State ===
As of the 2026 Senior League World Series.

Country	Region Championships	SLWS Championships	W–L	PCT
Western Australia	3	0	8–6	.571
New South Wales	2	0	1–4	.200
South Australia	1	0	2–2	.500
(Victoria (state)) Victoria	1	0	2–2	.500
Queensland	1	0	0–2	.000
Total	8	0	13–16	.448

== See also ==
Australia Region in other Little League divisions

- Little League
- Intermediate League
- Junior League
