= Senior League World Series (South Region) =

Southeast Region
- Most recent season or competition: 2026 Senior League World Series
- Formerly: South Region
- Sport: Baseball
- Founded: 2002
- No. of teams: 8
- Country: United States
- Most recent champion: (Georgia (U.S. state)) Macon, Georgia
- Most titles: Virginia (7)

Southwest Region
- Most recent season or competition: 2026 Senior League World Series
- Sport: Baseball
- Founded: 2002
- No. of teams: 8
- Country: United States
- Most recent champions: Laredo, West Texas
- Most titles: East Texas (15)

The Senior League World Series (SLWS) Southeast and Southwest regions are two of five United States regions that currently send teams to the Senior League World Series in Easley, South Carolina. The former South Region's participation in the SLWS dated back to 1962, until the region was divided in 2002.

== South Region States ==
In 2002 the region was split in half.

Southeast

- Alabama
- Florida
- (Georgia (U.S. state)) Georgia
- North Carolina
- South Carolina
- Tennessee
- Virginia
- West Virginia

Southwest

- Arkansas
- Colorado
- Louisiana
- Mississippi
- New Mexico
- Oklahoma
- Texas (East)
- Texas (West)

== Region Champions ==
As of the 2001 Senior League World Series.

=== South Region Champions ===
South Region
- Most recent season or competition: 2001 Senior League World Series
- Sport: Baseball
- Founded: 1962
- Folded: 2001
- Country: United States
- Last champion: Palm Harbor, Florida
- Most titles: Florida (20)

Year	City	SLWS	Record
1962	Fort Lauderdale, Florida	Third Place	0–1
1963	Randleman, North Carolina	Round 1	0–1
1964	Brenham, Texas	Runner-up	1–1
1965	El Campo, Texas	Runner-up	2–1
1966	Elkton, Maryland	Third Place	2–1
1967	Houston, Texas	Round 2	0–2
1968	West Tampa, Florida	Runner-up	4–2
1969	Louisville, Kentucky	Round 1	0–2
1970	West Tampa, Florida	Champions	4–0
1971	Richmond, Virginia	Runner-up	4–2
1972	Temple Terrace, Florida	Round 1	0–2
1973	Brenham, Texas	Third Place	3–2
1974	Charlotte, North Carolina	Runner-up	4–2
1975	West Tampa, Florida	Third Place	2–2
1976	Richmond, Virginia	Fourth Place	2–2
1977	Orlando, Florida	Runner-up	3–2
1978	Waskom, Texas	Third Place	2–2
1979	Tampa, Florida	Runner-up	3–2
1980	Houston, Texas	Round 2	1–2
1981	Fort Myers, Florida	Round 2	1–2
1982	Orange Park, Florida	Runner-up	3–2
1983	Nashville, Tennessee	Round 2	1–2
1984	Altamonte Springs, Florida	Champions	4–0
1985	Maryville, Tennessee	Third Place	3–2
1986	Brenham, Texas	Runner-up	3–2
1987	Tampa, Florida	Runner-up	3–2
1988	Azalea Park, Florida	Third Place	3–2
1989	Kernersville, North Carolina	Round 2	1–2
1990	Venice, Florida	Third Place	4–2
1991	Brandon, Florida	Round 2	2–3
1992	San Antonio, Texas	Fourth Place	3–3
1993	Mobile, Alabama	Round 3	1–3
1994	Brandon, Florida	Champions	5–0
1995	Dunedin, Florida	Champions	4–0
1996	Mobile, Alabama	Fourth Place	3–3
1997	Jacksonville, Florida	Round 3	3–3
1998	Seminole, Florida	Third Place	5–2
1999	Mint Hill, North Carolina	Round 2	0–2
2000	Pinellas Park, Florida	Runner-up	3–2
2001	Palm Harbor, Florida	Champions	4–0

==== Results by State ====
State	Region Championships	SLWS Championships	W–L	PCT
Florida	20	5	60–31	.659
Texas	8	0	15–15	.500
North Carolina	4	0	5–7	.417
Virginia	2	0	6–4	.600
Tennessee	2	0	4–4	.500
Alabama	2	0	4–6	.400
Maryland	1	0	2–1	.667
Kentucky	1	0	0–2	.000
Total	40	5	96–70	.578

=== Southeast Region Champions ===
Year	City	SLWS	Record
2002	Boynton Beach, Florida	Runner-up	4–2
2003	Chesterfield, Virginia	Runner-up	4–2
2004	Dade City, Florida	Semifinals	3–2
2005	(Georgia (U.S. state)) Clarkesville, Georgia	Semifinals	2–3
2006	Yorktown, Virginia	Semifinals	3–2
2007	(Georgia (U.S. state)) Cartersville, Georgia	Champions	4–2
2008	Boynton Beach, Florida	Semifinals	4–1
2009	Greenville, South Carolina	Pool stage	2–2
2010	Palm Bay, Florida (Host)	Pool stage	1–3
2011	Palm Bay, Florida (Host)	Pool stage	1–3
2012	Brevard County, Florida (Host)	Semifinals	3–2
2013	(Georgia (U.S. state)) Martinez, Georgia	Semifinals	3–2
2014	Dumfries, Virginia	Semifinals	3–2
2015	Dumfries, Virginia	Round 3	1–2
2016	Dumfries, Virginia	Semifinals	3–2
2017	Coral Springs, Florida	Runner-up	4–1
2018	Coral Springs, Florida	US Final	3–2
2019	Onancock, Virginia	Round 2	1–2
2020	Cancelled due to COVID-19 pandemic		
2021	Cancelled due to COVID-19 pandemic		
2022	Norfolk, Virginia	Runner-up	4–1
2023	Irmo, South Carolina	Round 1	0–2
2024	Irmo, South Carolina	Runner-up	3–1
2025	Irmo, South Carolina	US Final	2–1
2026	(Georgia (U.S. state)) Macon, Georgia	Round 3	2–2

=== Southwest Region Champions ===
Year	City	SLWS	Record
2002	Houston, East Texas	Semifinals	3–2
2003	Brenham, East Texas	Pool stage	2–2
2004	San Antonio, West Texas	Pool stage	2–2
2005	Marksville, Louisiana	Pool stage	1–3
2006	Tulsa, Oklahoma	Pool stage	2–2
2007	Tyler, East Texas	Semifinals	3–1
2008	Bryan, East Texas	Pool stage	2–2
2009	Houston, East Texas	Champions	5–1
2010	Houston, East Texas	Pool stage	2–2
2011	Tyler, East Texas	Runner-up	5–1
2012	Houston, East Texas	Pool stage	2–2
2013	Laredo, West Texas	Pool stage	2–2
2014	Houston, East Texas	Champions	5–1
2015	Houston, East Texas	Champions	5–1
2016	San Antonio, West Texas	Round 2	1–3
2017	Houston, East Texas	Round 3	3–2
2018	Waco, West Texas	Round 1	0–2
2019	Houston, East Texas	Round 3	1–2
2020	Cancelled due to COVID-19 pandemic		
2021	Cancelled due to COVID-19 pandemic		
2022	Houston, East Texas	US Final	2–2
2023	Weslaco, West Texas	Round 2	1–2
2024	Victoria, East Texas	Round 1	1–2
2025	Victoria, East Texas	Round 1	0–2
2026	Laredo, West Texas	Round 1	0–2

==== Results by State ====
As of the 2026 Senior League World Series.

State	Region Championships	SLWS Championships	W–L	PCT
Virginia	7	0	19–13	.594
Florida	5	0	18–8	.692
(Georgia (U.S. state)) Georgia	4	1	11–9	.550
South Carolina	4	0	7–6	.538
(Florida) Host Team(s)	3	0	5–8	.385
Total	23	1	60–44	.577

State	Region Championships	SLWS Championships	W–L	PCT
East Texas	15	3	41–25	.621
West Texas	6	0	6–13	.316
Oklahoma	1	0	2–2	.500
Louisiana	1	0	1–3	.250
Total	23	3	50–43	.538

== See also ==
South Region in other Little League divisions

- Little League – South 1957-2000
  - Little League – Southeast
  - Little League – Southwest
- Intermediate League
- Junior League
- Big League
