= 1988 Senior League World Series =

American youth baseball tournament

Tournament information
- Location: Kissimmee, Florida
- Dates: August 15–20, 1988

Final positions
- Champions: Pingtung, Taiwan
- Runner-up: Maracaibo, Venezuela

The 1988 Senior League World Series took place from August 15–20 in Kissimmee, Florida, United States. Pingtung, Taiwan defeated Maracaibo, Venezuela in the championship game.

== Teams ==
United States	International
(Maryland) Waldorf, Maryland East	Surrey, British Columbia, Canada Canada
(Michigan) Ypsilanti, Michigan North	(Saudi Arabia) Dhahran, Saudi Arabia Europe
(Florida) Azalea Park, Florida South	(Taiwan) Pingtung, Taiwan Far East
(California) Hacienda Heights, California West	Maracaibo, Venezuela Latin America

== Results ==
Upper round 1	Upper round 2	Upper final	World Championship
–	Florida	7
–	Maryland	1
1–0	Florida	0
1–0	Venezuela	3
–	Venezuela	11
–	Michigan	0
2–0	Venezuela	4
2–0	Taiwan	6
–	Canada	4
–	Saudi Arabia	6
1–0	Saudi Arabia	1
1–0	Taiwan	9
–	California	1
–	Taiwan	33	3–0	Taiwan	10	—
3–1	Venezuela	4	—
Lower round 1	Lower round 2	Lower round 3	Lower final
1–1	Saudi Arabia	1
0–1	Maryland	1	1–1	Michigan	12	2–1	Venezuela	11
0–1	Michigan	6	2–1	Michigan	3	3–1	Florida	3
2–1	Florida	6
1–1	Florida	4
0–1	Canada	1	1–1	California	2
0–1	California	6

1988 Senior League World Series Champions
Pingtung, Taiwan
