= 2006 Senior League World Series =

American youth baseball tournament

Tournament information
- Location: Bangor, Maine
- Dates: August 13–19, 2006

Final positions
- Champions: Punto Fijo, Venezuela
- Runner-up: Pearl City, Hawaii

The 2006 Senior League World Series took place from August 13–19 in Bangor, Maine, United States. Punto Fijo, Venezuela defeated Pearl City, Hawaii in the championship game.

== Teams ==
United States	International
(Maine) Bangor, Maine; District 3 Host	(Philippines) Makati, Philippines; Illam Central; Asia–Pacific
(Wisconsin) Madison, Wisconsin; Kennedy American; Central	(Saskatchewan) Regina, Saskatchewan; Regina National; Canada
(New Jersey) Bloomfield, New Jersey; Bloomfield; East	(Belgium) Brussels, Belgium; Waterloo; EMEA
(Virginia) Yorktown, Virginia; York County; Southeast	(Venezuela) Punto Fijo, Venezuela; Paraguana; Latin America
(Oklahoma) Tulsa, Oklahoma; Tulsa National/John Hess; Southwest	
(Hawaii) Pearl City, Hawaii; Pearl City; West

== Results ==
Group A

Team	W	L	Rs	Ra
Hawaii	4	0	44	9
Virginia	3	1	31	15
Canada	1	3	11	16
Maine	1	3	8	24
Philippines	1	3	10	40

	(Canada)	(Hawaii)	(Maine)	(Philippines)	(Virginia)
Canada	–	3–7	0–3	5–2	3–4
Hawaii	7–3	–	8–0	21–4	8–2
Maine	3–0	0–8	–	2–3	3–13
Philippines	2–5	4–21	3–2	–	1–12
Virginia	4–3	2–8	13–3	12–1	–

Group B

Team	W	L	Rs	Ra
Venezuela	4	0	56	12
New Jersey	3	1	36	27
Oklahoma	2	2	28	24
Wisconsin	1	3	15	48
Belgium	0	4	10	32

	(Belgium)	(New Jersey)	(Oklahoma)	(Venezuela)	(Wisconsin)
Belgium	–	2–10	4–6^{(9)}	1–12	3–4
New Jersey	10–2	–	10–8	8–12	8–5
Oklahoma	6–4^{(9)}	8–10	–	3–4	9–6
Venezuela	12–1	12–8	4–3	–	28–0
Wisconsin	4–3	5–8	6–9	0–28	–

Elimination Round

Semifinals
4–0	Hawaii	7
3–1	New Jersey	3
4–0	Venezuela	11
3–1	Virginia	1

World Championship
5–0	Hawaii	2
5–0	Venezuela	4

2006 Senior League World Series Champions
Paraguana LL
Punto Fijo, Venezuela
