= Senior League World Series (Central Region) =

Central Region
- Most recent season or competition: 2026 Senior League World Series
- Sport: Baseball
- Founded: 1962
- No. of teams: 13
- Country: United States
- Most recent champion: Oglesby, Illinois
- Most titles: Illinois (16)

The Senior League World Series Central Region is one of six United States regions that currently sends teams to the World Series in Easley, South Carolina. The region's participation in the SLWS dates back to 1962, when it was known as the North Region.

== Central Region States ==
- Illinois
- Indiana
- Iowa
- Kansas
- Kentucky
- Michigan
- Minnesota
- Missouri
- Nebraska
- North Dakota
- Ohio
- South Dakota
- Wisconsin

== Region Champions ==
As of the 2026 Senior League World Series.

Year	City	Result	Record
1962	New London, Ohio	Third Place	0–1
1963	Gary, Indiana	Third Place	1–1
1964	Des Moines, Iowa	Third Place	0–1
1965	Merrillville, Indiana	Fourth Place	1–2
1966	Dayton, Ohio	Round 1	0–2
1967	Madison, Wisconsin	Third Place	1–2
1968	Dayton, Ohio	Fourth Place	2–2
1969	Des Moines, Iowa	Round 2	1–2
1970	Painesville, Ohio	Third Place	3–2
1971	Madison, Wisconsin	Fourth Place	3–2
1972	Lincolnwood, Illinois	Round 4	2–2
1973	Chicago, Illinois	Round 3	1–2
1974	Chicago, Illinois	Round 2	1–2
1975	Chicago, Illinois	Runner-up	4–2
1976	Grand Rapids, Michigan	Third Place	2–2
1977	Madison, Wisconsin	Third Place	3–2
1978	Burbank, Illinois	Runner-up	4–2
1979	Taylor, Michigan	Fourth Place	2–2
1980	Chicago, Illinois	Round 2	1–2
1981	Taylor, Michigan	Round 2	1–2
1982	Milwaukee, Wisconsin	Round 1	0–2
1983	Fort Wayne, Indiana	Round 2	1–2
1984	Midland, Michigan	Round 2	1–2
1985	Chicago, Illinois	Round 1	0–2
1986	Midland, Michigan	Round 2	1–2
1987	Athens, Ohio	Champions	5–1
1988	Ypsilanti, Michigan	Fourth Place	2–2
1989	Painesville, Ohio	Round 1	0–2
1990	South Gibson, Indiana	Round 1	0–3
1991	Fort Wayne, Indiana	Round 3	3–3
1992	Center Grove, Indiana	Round 3	2–3
1993	Center Grove, Indiana	Fourth Place	3–3
1994	Midland, Michigan	Runner-up	3–2
1995	Clarksville, Indiana	Runner-up	4–2
1996	Maumee, Ohio	Round 3	2–3
1997	Saginaw, Michigan	Round 2	1–3
1998	Fort Wayne, Indiana	Round 2	1–3
1999	Chicago, Illinois	Round 2	1–2
2000	Des Moines, Iowa	Round 3	1–3
2001	Kalamazoo, Michigan	Round 2	2–3
2002	South Bend, Indiana	Pool stage	2–2
2003	Urbandale, Iowa	Semifinals	2–3
2004	Chicago, Illinois	Pool stage	2–2
2005	Urbandale, Iowa	Champions	5–1
2006	Madison, Wisconsin	Pool stage	1–3
2007	Niles, Michigan	Pool stage	1–2
2008	New Philadelphia, Ohio	Pool stage	2–2
2009	Madison, Wisconsin	Pool stage	1–3
2010	Holmes County, Ohio	Pool stage	2–2
2011	Midland, Michigan	Pool stage	2–2
2012	Grand Rapids, Michigan	Semifinals	2–3
2013	Chicago, Illinois	Pool stage	0–4
2014	Grand Rapids, Michigan	Pool stage	1–3
2015	Holmes County, Ohio	Runner-up	3–1
2016	Chicago, Illinois	Champions	5–0
2017	Holmes County, Ohio	Round 1	1–2
2018	Grand Rapids, Michigan	Round 2	1–2
2019	Madison, Wisconsin	Round 1	1–2
2020	Cancelled due to COVID-19 pandemic		
2021	Cancelled due to COVID-19 pandemic		
2022	Burbank, Illinois	Round 1	0–2
2023	Burbank, Illinois	Round 1	0–2
2024	Burbank, Illinois	Round 2	1–2
2025	Burbank, Illinois	Round 3	2–2
2026	Oglesby, Illinois	Round 1	0–2

=== Results by State ===
As of the 2026 Senior League World Series.

State	Region Championships	SLWS Championships	W–L	PCT
Illinois	16	1	24–32	.429
Michigan	14	0	22–32	.407
Ohio	11	1	20–20	.500
Indiana	10	0	18–24	.429
Wisconsin	7	0	10–16	.385
Iowa	5	1	9–10	.474
Total	63	3	103–134	.435

== See also ==
Central Region in other Little League divisions

- Little League – Central 1957-2000
  - Little League – Great Lakes
  - Little League – Midwest
- Intermediate League
- Junior League
- Big League
