= 2024 Senior League World Series =

Tournament details
- Country: United States
- City: Easley, South Carolina
- Dates: July 27 – August 3, 2024
- Teams: 12

Final positions
- Champions: Maracaibo, Venezuela
- Runners-up: Irmo, South Carolina

The 2024 Senior League World Series took place from July 27–August 3 in Easley, South Carolina. Maracaibo, Venezuela defeated Irmo, South Carolina in the championship game.

== Teams ==
United States	International
(South Carolina) Easley, South Carolina; District 1 (Easley); Host	Guam; Guam District 1 Asia–Pacific
(Illinois) Burbank, Illinois; Burbank American; Central	(Western Australia) Perth, Western Australia; Perth Metro East; Australia
(Massachusetts) Auburn, Massachusetts; Auburn; East	(Quebec) Mirabel, Quebec; Diamond Baseball; Canada
(South Carolina) Irmo, South Carolina; Irmo; Southeast	Oranjestad, Aruba; Aruba North; Caribbean
(Texas) Victoria, Texas; Northeast; Southwest	(Czech Republic) Brno, Czech Republic; South Czech Republic; Europe–Africa
(California) Redondo Beach, California; Redondo Beach; West	(Venezuela) Maracaibo, Venezuela; Coquivacoa; Latin America

== Results ==
=== United States Bracket ===
Upper round 1
Texas (F/9)	12
Massachusetts	11
Illinois	4
(South Carolina) Host	6
Lower round 1
Massachusetts	3
(South Carolina) Host	8
Illinois	5
Texas	4

Upper round 2
South Carolina (F/6)	16
Texas	0
California	8
(South Carolina) Host	2
Lower round 2
(South Carolina) Host	8
Illinois	0

Upper final
South Carolina	8
California	0
Lower final
California	2
(South Carolina) Host	1

United States Championship
South Carolina	7
California	2

=== International Bracket ===
Upper round 1
Canada	3
Aruba	0
Venezuela (F/4)	15
Guam	0
Lower round 1
Aruba	3
Australia	5
Guam	3
Czech Republic	6

Upper round 2
Czech Republic	3
Canada	6
Australia	0
Venezuela (F/6)	10
Lower round 2
Australia	5
Czech Republic	2

Upper final
Canada	2
Venezuela	3
Lower final
Canada	7
Australia	4

International Championship
Venezuela	10
Canada	1

=== World Championship ===
World Championship
South Carolina	3
Venezuela	9

2024 Senior League World Series Champions
Coquivacoa LL
Maracaibo, Venezuela
