= 1968 Senior League World Series =

American youth baseball tournament

Tournament information
- Location: Gary, Indiana
- Dates: August 13–18, 1968

Final positions
- Champions: (New York (state)) New Hyde Park, New York
- Runner-up: West Tampa, Florida

The 1968 Senior League World Series took place from August 13–18 in Gary, Indiana, United States. New Hyde Park, New York defeated West Tampa, Florida in the championship game. It was the third straight title for New York. This was the first SLWS held in Gary.

== Teams ==
United States	International
(Indiana) Gary, Indiana; East Glen Park; Host	Fort William, Ontario Canada
(New York (state)) New Hyde Park, New York East	Matamoros, Mexico Mexico
(Ohio) Dayton, Ohio; Dayton View; North	
(Florida) West Tampa, Florida South
(California) Sacramento, California; Grant; West

== Results ==
Upper round 1	Upper round 2	Upper final	World Championship
—	Florida	4
—	Ohio	0
1–0	Florida	2
1–0	California	6
—	California	4
—	Canada	3
2–0	California	0
2–0	(New York (state)) New York	2
—	Indiana	0
—	(New York (state)) New York	3
1–0	(New York (state)) New York	6
—	Mexico	0
3–0	(New York (state)) New York	6	—
4–1	Florida	3	—
Lower round 1	Lower round 2	Lower round 3	Lower final
0–1	Mexico	0
0–1	Ohio	2	1–1	Ohio	3	2–1	California
0–1	Canada	0	2–1	Ohio	0	3–1	Florida
2–1	Florida	3
1–1	Florida	6
0–1	Indiana	2

1968 Senior League World Series Champions
New Hyde Park, New York
