= 2009 Senior League World Series =

American youth baseball tournament

Tournament information
- Location: Bangor, Maine
- Dates: August 16–22, 2009

Final positions
- Champions: Houston, Texas
- Runner-up: Fremont, California

The 2009 Senior League World Series took place from August 16–22 in Bangor, Maine, United States. Houston, Texas defeated Fremont, California in the championship game.

== Teams ==
United States	International
(Maine) Bangor, Maine; District 3 Host	(Philippines) Makati, Philippines; Illam Central; Asia–Pacific
(Wisconsin) Madison, Wisconsin; West Madison National; Central	(Ontario) Cornwall, Ontario; Cornwall; Canada
(New Jersey) Vineland, New Jersey; Vineland South; East	(Italy) Friuli, Italy; Friuli Venezia Giulia; EMEA
(South Carolina) Greenville, South Carolina; Northwood; Southeast	San Nicolaas, Aruba; Aruba South; Latin America
(Texas) Houston, Texas; West University; Southwest	
(California) Fremont, California; Niles/Centerville; West

== Results ==
Group A

Team	W	L	Rs	Ra
California	4	0	22	11
Philippines	3	1	21	14
South Carolina	2	2	19	12
Maine	1	3	12	22
Canada	0	4	8	23

	(California)	(Canada)	(Maine)	(Philippines)	(South Carolina)
California	–	6–3^{(12)}	7–6^{(8)}	4–1	5–1
Canada	3–6^{(12)}	–	0–1	4–5	1–11
Maine	6–7^{(8)}	1–0	–	3–11	2–4^{(10)}
Philippines	1–4	5–4	11–3	–	4–3
South Carolina	1–5	11–1	4–2^{(10)}	3–4	–

Group B

Team	W	L	Rs	Ra
Texas	3	1	26	26
Aruba	3	1	37	12
New Jersey	2	2	29	32
Italy	1	3	20	36
Wisconsin	1	3	28	34

	(Aruba)	(Italy)	(New Jersey)	(Texas)	(Wisconsin)
Aruba	–	11–0	14–1	4–7	8–4
Italy	0–11	–	6–11	3–6	11–8
New Jersey	1–14	11–6	–	11–4	6–8
Texas	7–4	6–3	4–11	–	9–8
Wisconsin	4–8	8–11	8–6	8–9	–

Elimination Round

Semifinals
4–0	California	7
3–1	Aruba	6
3–1	Texas	6
3–1	Philippines	1

World Championship
5–0	California	7
4–1	Texas	9

2009 Senior League World Series Champions
West University LL
Houston, Texas
