= 2011 Senior League World Series =

American youth baseball tournament

Tournament information
- Location: Bangor, Maine
- Dates: August 14–20, 2011

Final positions
- Champions: Hilo, Hawaii
- Runner-up: Tyler, Texas

The 2011 Senior League World Series took place from August 14–20 in Bangor, Maine, United States. Hilo, Hawaii defeated Tyler, Texas in the championship game.

== Teams ==
United States	International
(Maine) Brewer, Maine; District 3 Host	(Philippines) Batangas, Philippines; Tanauan; Asia–Pacific
(Michigan) Midland, Michigan; Northeast/Fraternal Northwest; Central	(Quebec) Montréal, Quebec; Notre Dame de Gracé; Canada
(Maryland) Talbot County, Maryland; Easton/Home Run Baker; East	(Italy) Friuli, Italy; Friuli Venezia Giulia; EMEA
(Florida) Palm Bay, Florida; Palm Bay East; Southeast	San Nicolaas, Aruba; Aruba South; Latin America
(Texas) Tyler, Texas; Rose Capital East; Southwest	
(Hawaii) Hilo, Hawaii; Hilo; West

== Results ==
Group A

Team	W	L	Rs	Ra
Texas	4	0	34	12
Italy	3	1	31	32
Maryland	2	2	36	23
Maine	1	3	17	16
Canada	0	4	15	40

	(Canada)	(Italy)	(Maine)	(Maryland)	(Texas)
Canada	–	7–13	2–7	2–15	4–5
Italy	13–7	–	7–6	9–8	2–11
Maine	7–2	6–7	–	4–7	0–10
Maryland	15–2	8–9	7–4	–	6–8
Texas	5–4	11–2	10–0	8–6	–

Group B

Team	W	L	Rs	Ra
Hawaii	4	0	31	11
Aruba	3	1	24	9
Michigan	2	2	23	21
Florida	1	3	29	30
Philippines	0	4	13	44

	(Aruba)	(Florida)	(Hawaii)	(Michigan)	(Philippines)
Aruba	–	6–2	3–4	5–1	9–2
Florida	2–6	–	7–10	5–7	15–7
Hawaii	4–3	10–7	–	7–1	10–0
Michigan	1–5	7–5	1–7	–	10–4
Philippines	2–9	7–15	0–10	4–10	–

Elimination Round

Semifinals
4–0	Texas	10
3–1	Aruba	5
4–0	Hawaii	10
3–1	Italy	0

World Championship
5–0	Texas	1
5–0	Hawaii	11

2011 Senior League World Series Champions
Hilo LL
Hilo, Hawaii
