= 2025 Senior League World Series =

Tournament details
- Country: United States
- City: Easley, South Carolina
- Dates: July 26 – August 2, 2025
- Teams: 12

Final positions
- Champions: Guaynabo, Puerto Rico
- Runners-up: Easley, South Carolina

The 2025 Senior League World Series took place from July 26–August 2 in Easley, South Carolina. Guaynabo, Puerto Rico defeated Easley, South Carolina in the championship game.

== Teams ==
United States	International
(South Carolina) Easley, South Carolina; District 1 (Easley); Host	Guam; Guam District 1 Asia–Pacific
(Illinois) Burbank, Illinois; Burbank American; Central	(Western Australia) Perth, Western Australia; Wanneroo; Australia
(Pennsylvania) Dubois, Pennsylvania; Dubois; East	(Quebec) Mirabel, Quebec; Diamond Baseball; Canada
(South Carolina) Irmo, South Carolina; Irmo; Southeast	(Puerto Rico) Guaynabo, Puerto Rico; Amelia Baseball Club; Caribbean
(Texas) Victoria, Texas; Northeast; Southwest	(Czech Republic) Brno, Czech Republic; South Czech Republic; Europe–Africa
(California) Spring Valley, California; Spring Valley; West	(Mexico) Tamaulipas, Mexico; Santa Maria de Aguayo; Latin America (Note: Cacique Mara LL from Maracaibo, Venezuela won the Latin American Regional tournament in 2025, but was denied visas for entry into the United States. The team was replaced by the Santa Maria de Aguayo LL from Victoria, Mexico, runner-up of the tournament.)

== Results ==
=== United States Bracket ===
Upper round 1
–	Pennsylvania	0
–	Illinois	9
—	California	1
—	(South Carolina) Host	7
Lower round 1
0–1	California	9
0–1	Texas	7
0–1	Pennsylvania	2
1–1	(South Carolina) Host	11

Upper round 2
—	Texas	9
1—0	Illinois (F/8)	10
—	South Carolina	5
1—0	(South Carolina) Host	3
Lower round 2
1–1	California	2
2–1	(South Carolina) Host	9

Upper final
2–0	Illinois	4
1–0	South Carolina	5
Lower final
2–1	Illinois	3
3–1	(South Carolina) Host	4

United States Championship
2–0	South Carolina	4
4–1	(South Carolina) Host	7

=== International Bracket ===
Upper round 1
–	Puerto Rico (F/6)	16
–	Guam	6
–	Australia	5
–	Mexico	4
Lower round 1
0–1	Mexico	6
0–1	Canada	1
0–1	Guam	5
1–1	Australia	10

Upper round 2
–	Canada	4
1–0	Puerto Rico	15
–	Czech Republic	6
1–0	Australia	2
Lower round 2
1–1	Mexico	0
2–1	Australia	8

Upper final
2–0	Puerto Rico	10
1–0	Czech Republic	7
Lower final
1–1	Czech Republic	0
3–1	Australia	1

International Championship
3–0	Puerto Rico	9
4–1	Australia	6

=== World Championship ===
World Championship
4–0	Puerto Rico	3
5–1	(South Carolina) Host	2

2025 Senior League World Series Champions
Amelia Baseball Club LL
Guaynabo, Puerto Rico
