= 1965 Senior League World Series =

American youth baseball tournament

Tournament information
- Location: Des Moines, Iowa
- Dates: August 19–21, 1965

Final positions
- Champions: Monterrey, Mexico
- Runner-up: El Campo, Texas

The 1965 Senior League World Series took place from August 19–21 in Des Moines, Iowa, United States. Monterrey, Mexico defeated El Campo, Texas in the championship game. This was the first SLWS held in Des Moines.

This year marked the first appearance by a Canadian team.

== Teams ==
United States	International
(Connecticut) Norwich, Connecticut East	Stoney Creek, Ontario Canada
(Indiana) Merrillville, Indiana North	Monterrey, Mexico; Del Norte; Mexico
(Texas) El Campo, Texas South	
(California) San Jose, California; West Branham Hills; West

== Results ==
Opening Round
—	Canada	1
—	Texas	7
—	California	2
—	Indiana	5

Semifinals
1–0	Texas	4
—	Connecticut	0
—	Mexico	2
1–0	Indiana	1

Championship
2–0	Texas	0
1–0	Mexico	5
Third Place Game
0–1	Connecticut	9
1–1	Indiana	7

1965 Senior League World Series Champions
Del Norte LL
Monterrey, Mexico
