= Senior League World Series (West Region) =

West Region
- Most recent season or competition: 2026 Senior League World Series
- Sport: Baseball
- Founded: 1962
- No. of teams: 12
- Country: United States
- Most recent champion: Pearl City, Hawaii
- Most titles: Southern California (23)

The Senior League World Series West Region is one of six United States regions that currently sends teams to the World Series in Easley, South Carolina. The region's participation in the SLWS dates back to 1962.

== West Region States ==
- Alaska
- Arizona
- Northern California
- Southern California
- Hawaii
- Idaho
- Montana
- Nevada
- Oregon
- Utah
- Washington
- Wyoming

== Region Champions ==
As of the 2026 Senior League World Series.

| Year | City | SLWS | Record |
|---|---|---|---|
| 1962 | La Habra, Southern California | Runner-up | 1–1 |
| 1963 | Downey, Southern California | Runner-up | 1–1 |
| 1964 | Superior, Arizona | Third Place | 0–1 |
| 1965 | San Jose, Northern California | Round 1 | 0–1 |
| 1966 | La Habra, Southern California | Runner-up | 1–1 |
| 1967 | North Hollywood, Southern California | Fourth Place | 2–2 |
| 1968 | Sacramento, Northern California | Third Place | 2–2 |
| 1969 | Sacramento, Northern California | Champions | 4–0 |
| 1970 | Santa Ana, Southern California | Round 3 | 1–2 |
| 1971 | La Habra, Southern California | Champions | 4–0 |
| 1972 | Oxnard, Southern California | Runner-up | 5–2 |
| 1973 | San Jose, Northern California | Round 3 | 1–2 |
| 1974 | Lennox, Southern California | Third Place | 2–2 |
| 1975 | Fresno, Northern California | Fourth Place | 2–2 |
| 1976 | Aiea, Hawaii | Runner-up | 3–2 |
| 1977 | San Jose, Northern California | Round 2 | 1–2 |
| 1978 | Kaneohe, Hawaii | Round 2 | 1–2 |
| 1979 | Northridge, Southern California | Round 2 | 1–2 |
| 1980 | Kaneohe, Hawaii | Runner-up | 4–2 |
| 1981 | Danville, Northern California | Runner-up | 3–2 |
| 1982 | Santa Barbara, Southern California | Champions | 4–0 |
| 1983 | San Ramon, Northern California | Fourth Place | 2–2 |
| 1984 | Walnut Creek, Northern California | Third Place | 2–2 |
| 1985 | Mission Hills, Southern California | Fourth Place | 2–2 |
| 1986 | Las Vegas, Nevada | Round 2 | 1–2 |
| 1987 | Moloka'i, Hawaii | Third Place | 3–2 |
| 1988 | Hacienda Heights, Southern California | Round 2 | 1–2 |
| 1989 | Union City, Northern California | Round 2 | 1–2 |
| 1990 | Danville, Northern California | Runner-up | 4–2 |
| 1991 | Pearl City, Hawaii | Runner-up | 3–2 |
| 1992 | Torrance, Southern California | Third Place | 4–2 |
| 1993 | Henderson, Nevada | Third Place | 4–2 |
| 1994 | Henderson, Nevada | Fourth Place | 4–3 |
| 1995 | Stockton, Northern California | Third Place | 4–2 |
| 1996 | Thousand Oaks, Southern California | Runner-up | 4–2 |
| 1997 | Yucaipa, Southern California | Runner-up | 5–2 |
| 1998 | Diamond Bar, Southern California | Champions | 4–0 |
| 1999 | Westminster, Southern California | Round 3 | 3–2 |
| 2000 | Union City, Northern California | Round 2 | 3–3 |
| 2001 | Sunnyvale, Northern California | Third Place | 4–2 |
| 2002 | San Pedro, Southern California | Semifinals | 3–2 |
| 2003 | Hilo, Hawaii | Champions | 5–1 |
| 2004 | El Rio, Southern California | Runner-up | 4–2 |
| 2005 | Pearl City, Hawaii | Runner-up | 5–1 |
| 2006 | Pearl City, Hawaii | Runner-up | 5–1 |
| 2007 | Hilo, Hawaii | Semifinals | 4–1 |
| 2008 | Pearl City, Hawaii | Pool stage | 2–2 |
| 2009 | Fremont, Northern California | Runner-up | 5–1 |
| 2010 | Manhattan Beach, Southern California | Semifinals | 4–1 |
| 2011 | Hilo, Hawaii | Champions | 6–0 |
| 2012 | Lemon Grove, Southern California | Runner-up | 5–1 |
| 2013 | Pearl City, Hawaii | Semifinals | 4–1 |
| 2014 | Wailuku, Hawaii | Pool stage | 2–2 |
| 2015 | Nogales, Arizona | Round 1 | 1–2 |
| 2016 | Wailuku, Hawaii | Round 3 | 1–2 |
| 2017 | Wailuku, Hawaii | US Final | 2–2 |
| 2018 | Wailuku, Hawaii | Round 1 | 1–2 |
| 2019 | Wailuku, Hawaii | Champions | 5–0 |
| 2020 | Cancelled due to COVID-19 pandemic | | |
| 2021 | Cancelled due to COVID-19 pandemic | | |
| 2022 | Wailuku, Hawaii | Round 1 | 0–2 |
| 2023 | Wailuku, Hawaii | US Final | 4–2 |
| 2024 | Redondo Beach, Southern California | US Final | 2–2 |
| 2025 | Spring Valley, Southern California | Round 2 | 1–2 |
| 2026 | Pearl City, Hawaii | Champions | 5–1 |

=== Results by State ===
As of the 2026 Senior League World Series.

| State | Region Championships | SLWS Championships | W–L | PCT |
|---|---|---|---|---|
| Southern California | 23 | 3 | 64–35 | .646 |
| Hawaii | 20 | 4 | 65–30 | .684 |
| Northern California | 15 | 1 | 38–27 | .585 |
| Nevada | 3 | 0 | 9–7 | .563 |
| Arizona | 2 | 0 | 1–3 | .250 |
| Total | 63 | 8 | 177–102 | .634 |

== See also ==
West Region in other Little League divisions

- Little League – West 1957-2000
  - Little League – Northwest
  - Little League – West
- Intermediate League
- Junior League
- Big League
