= 1985 Senior League World Series =

American youth baseball tournament

Tournament information
- Location: Gary, Indiana
- Dates: August 12–18, 1985

Final positions
- Champions: Pingtung, Taiwan
- Runner-up: Curaçao, Netherlands Antilles

The 1985 Senior League World Series took place from August 12–18 in Gary, Indiana, United States. Pingtung, Taiwan defeated Curaçao, Netherlands Antilles in the championship game.

This was the final SLWS held in Gary.

== Teams ==
United States	International
(New Hampshire) Salem, New Hampshire East	Lethbridge, Alberta Canada
(Illinois) Chicago, Illinois; Archer Manor; North	Brussels, Belgium Europe
(Tennessee) Maryville, Tennessee South	(Taiwan) Pingtung, Taiwan Far East
(California) Mission Hills, California West	(Netherlands Antilles) Curaçao, Netherlands Antilles Latin America

== Results ==
Upper round 1	Upper round 2	Upper final	Championship
—	Netherlands Antilles	15
—	Canada	3
1–0	Netherlands Antilles	2
1–0	New Hampshire	1
—	Illinois	7
—	New Hampshire	8
2–0	Netherlands Antilles	2
2–0	Taiwan	5
—	California	1
—	Taiwan	2
1–0	Taiwan	3
1–0	Tennessee	2
—	Tennessee	11
—	Belgium	2	3–0	Taiwan	3	—
3–1	Netherlands Antilles	2	—
Lower round 1	Lower round 2	Lower round 3	Lower final
1–1	Tennessee	3
0–1	Canada	9	1–1	Canada	1	2–1	Netherlands Antilles	10
0–1	Illinois	8	2–1	Tennessee	6	3–1	Tennessee	3
2–1	California	1
1–1	New Hampshire	1
0–1	California	9	1–1	California	7
0–1	Belgium	3

1985 Senior League World Series Champions
Pingtung, Taiwan
