= 2002 Senior League World Series =

American youth baseball tournament

Tournament information
- Location: Bangor, Maine
- Dates: August 11–17, 2002

Final positions
- Champions: Willemstad, Curaçao
- Runner-up: Boynton Beach, Florida

The 2002 Senior League World Series took place from August 11–17 in Bangor, Maine, United States. Willemstad, Curaçao defeated Boynton Beach, Florida in the championship game.

In addition to being the first SLWS in Bangor; the double elimination format was replaced by round robin pool play.

== Teams ==
United States	International
(Maine) Bangor, Maine; District 3 Host	(Philippines) Philippines Asia–Pacific
South Bend, Indiana; Chet Wagner; Central	(Ontario) LaSalle, Ontario; Turtle Club; Canada
Vineland, New Jersey; South Vineland; East	Moscow, Russia; Khovimo; Europe
(Florida) Boynton Beach, Florida; Palm Harbor American; Southeast	Willemstad, Curaçao; Pabao; Latin America
(Texas) Houston, Texas; Northwest 45; Southwest	
(California) San Pedro, California; Eastview; West

== Results ==
Group A

Team	W	L	Rs	Ra
California	3	1	21	10
Florida	3	1	34	21
Canada	2	2	20	20
Russia	1	3	14	33
Maine	1	3	19	24

	(California)	(Canada)	(Florida)	(Maine)	(Russia)
California	–	5–1	7–1	3–7	6–1
Canada	1–5	–	10–12	1–0	8–3
Florida	1–7	12–10	–	10–4	11–0
Maine	7–3	0–1	4–10	–	8–10
Russia	1–6	3–8	0–11	10–8	–

Group B

Team	W	L	Rs	Ra
Texas	3	1	36	11
Curaçao	3	1	45	21
Indiana	2	2	36	32
New Jersey	2	2	36	20
Philippines	0	4	10	79

	(Curaçao)	(Indiana)	(New Jersey)	(Philippines)	(Texas)
Curaçao	–	9–8^{(11)}	6–2	25–0	5–11
Indiana	8–9^{(11)}	–	11–7	17–8	0–8
New Jersey	2–6	7–11	–	22–1	5–2
Philippines	0–25	8–17	1–22	–	1–15
Texas	11–5	8–0	2–5	15–1	–

Elimination Round

Semifinals
3–1	California	2
3–1	Curaçao	8
3–1	Texas	11
3–1	Florida	14

World Championship
4–1	Curaçao	8
4–1	Florida	4

2002 Senior League World Series Champions
Pabao LL
Willemstad, Curaçao
