= 1969 Senior League World Series =

American youth baseball tournament

Tournament information
- Location: Gary, Indiana
- Dates: August 12–16, 1969

Final positions
- Champions: Sacramento, California
- Runner-up: Gary, Indiana

The 1969 Senior League World Series took place from August 12–16 in Gary, Indiana, United States. Sacramento, California defeated Gary, Indiana in the championship game.

This year featured the debut of the European region.

== Teams ==
| United States | International |
|---|---|
| (Indiana) Gary, Indiana; Midtown; Host | Fort William, Ontario Canada |
| (New York (state)) Oceanside, New York East | (West Germany) Wiesbaden, West Germany Europe |
| (Iowa) Des Moines, Iowa; Grandview; North | Nuevo Laredo, Mexico Mexico |
| (Kentucky) Louisville, Kentucky; South Louisville; South | |
(California) Sacramento, California; Airport; West

== Results ==
Upper round 1 | Upper round 2 | Upper final | World Championship
— | California | 12
— | Iowa | 2
1–0 | California | 8
1–0 | (New York (state)) New York | 4
— | (New York (state)) New York | 11
— | Kentucky | 5
2–0 | California
2–0 | Indiana
— | Indiana
— | Canada
1–0 | Indiana | 10
1–0 | Mexico | 5
— | Mexico
— | West Germany | 3–0 | California | 9 | —
3–1 | Indiana | 1 | —
Lower round 1 | Lower round 2 | Lower round 3 | Lower final
1–1 | (New York (state)) New York | 13
0–1 | Iowa | 5 | 1–1 | Iowa | 3 | 2–1 | Indiana | 4
0–1 | Kentucky | 4 | 2–1 | (New York (state)) New York | 8 | 3–1 | (New York (state)) New York | 3
2–1 | West Germany | 7
1–1 | Mexico
0–1 | Canada | 3 | 1–1 | West Germany
0–1 | West Germany | 4

1969 Senior League World Series Champions
Airport LL
Sacramento, California
