= Senior League World Series (Europe–Africa Region) =

Europe–Africa Region
- Most recent season or competition: 2026 Senior League World Series
- Sport: Baseball
- Founded: 1969
- Most recent champions: Brno, Czech Republic
- Most titles: Germany (13)

The Senior League World Series Europe-Africa Region is one of six International regions that currently sends teams to the World Series in Easley, South Carolina. The region's participation in the SLWS dates back to 1969.

== Europe–Africa Region Countries ==
- Austria
- Belgium
- Czech Republic
- Italy
- Netherlands
- Spain
- United Kingdom

== Region Champions ==
As of the 2026 Senior League World Series.

Year	City	SLWS	Record
1969	Wiesbaden, West Germany	Fourth Place	2–2
1970	Brussels, Belgium	Round 2	0–2
1971	Wiesbaden, West Germany	Round 2	0–2
1972	Bavaria, West Germany	Round 2	0–2
1973	Wiesbaden, West Germany	Round 1	0–2
1974	Wiesbaden, West Germany	Fourth Place	2–2
1975	Wiesbaden, West Germany	Round 2	1–2
1976	Wiesbaden, West Germany	Round 1	0–2
1977	Madrid, Spain	Round 1	0–2
1978	Madrid, Spain	Round 1	0–2
1979	Bitburg, West Germany	Round 1	0–2
1980	Aviano, Italy	Round 1	0–2
1981	Mons, Belgium	Round 1	0–2
1982	Brussels, Belgium	Round 1	0–2
1983	Brussels, Belgium	Round 1	0–2
1984	London, England	Round 1	0–2
1985	Brussels, Belgium	Round 1	0–2
1986	Brussels, Belgium	Round 1	0–2
1987	Brussels, Belgium	Round 1	0–2
1988	Dhahran, Saudi Arabia	Round 2	1–2
1989	Dhahran, Saudi Arabia	Round 1	0–2
1990	Brussels, Belgium	Round 3	2–3
1991	Ramstein, Germany	Third Place	4–2
1992	Ramstein, Germany	Round 1	0–3
1993	Dhahran, Saudi Arabia	Round 1	0–3
1994	Dhahran, Saudi Arabia	Round 2	1–3
1995	Ramstein, Germany	Round 1	0–3
1996	Dhahran, Saudi Arabia	Round 1	0–3
1997	Huntingdon, England	Round 1	0–3
1998	Brussels, Belgium (Host)	Round 1	0–3
1999	Brussels, Belgium	Round 1	0–3
2000	Ramstein, Germany	Round 3	2–3
2001	Ramstein, Germany	Round 1	0–3
2002	Moscow, Russia	Pool stage	1–3
2003	Moscow, Russia	Pool stage	2–2
2004	Rotterdam, Netherlands	Pool stage	0–4
2005	(Georgia (country)) Tbilisi, Georgia	Pool stage	1–3
2006	Brussels, Belgium	Pool stage	0–4
2007	Vilnius, Lithuania	Pool stage	0–4
2008	Vilnius, Lithuania	Pool stage	0–4
2009	Friuli, Italy	Pool stage	1–3
2010	Lazio, Italy	Pool stage	1–3
2011	Friuli, Italy	Semifinals	3–2
2012	Emilia, Italy	Pool stage	1–3
2013	Emilia, Italy	Pool stage	1–3
2014	Emilia, Italy	Pool stage	1–3
2015	Lazio, Italy	Round 2	1–3
2016	Barcelona, Spain	Round 1	1–2
2017	Emilia, Italy	Round 2	1–2
2018	Bologna, Italy	Int'l Final	4–2
2019	Bologna, Italy	Round 3	2–2
2020	Cancelled due to COVID-19 pandemic		
2021	Cancelled due to COVID-19 pandemic		
2022	Nettuno, Italy	Round 1	0–2
2023	Haarlem, Netherlands	Round 2	2–2
2024	Brno, Czech Republic	Round 2	1–2
2025	Brno, Czech Republic	Round 3	1–2
2026	Brno, Czech Republic	Round 1	0–2

=== Results by Country ===
As of the 2026 Senior League World Series.

Country	Region Championships	SLWS Championships	W–L	PCT
Germany	13	0	11–30	.268
Italy	12	0	16–30	.348
Belgium	10	0	2–24	.077
Saudi Arabia	5	0	2–13	.133
Czech Republic	3	0	2–6	.250
Spain	3	0	1–6	.143
Russia	2	0	3–5	.375
Netherlands	2	0	2–6	.250
England	2	0	0–5	.000
Lithuania	2	0	0–8	.000
(Georgia (country)) Georgia	1	0	1–3	.250
(Belgium) Host Team(s)	1	0	0–3	.000
Total	56	0	40–139	.223

== See also ==
Europe–Africa Region in other Little League divisions

- Little League
- Intermediate League
- Junior League
- Big League
