= 2010 Senior League World Series =

American youth baseball tournament

Tournament information
- Location: Bangor, Maine
- Dates: August 15–21, 2010

Final positions
- Champions: San Nicolaas, Aruba
- Runner-up: Bangor, Maine

The 2010 Senior League World Series took place from August 15–21 in Bangor, Maine, United States. San Nicolaas, Aruba defeated host Bangor, Maine in the championship game.

== Teams ==
United States	International
(Maine) Bangor, Maine; District 3 Host	(Northern Mariana Islands) Saipan, Northern Mariana Islands; Saipan; Asia–Pacific
(Ohio) Holmes County, Ohio; Holmes County; Central	(Alberta) Edmonton, Alberta; East Park; Canada
(New Jersey) Vineland, New Jersey; South Vineland; East	(Italy) Lazio, Italy; Lazio; EMEA
(Florida) Palm Bay, Florida; Palm Bay East; Southeast	San Nicolaas, Aruba; Aruba South; Latin America
(Texas) Houston, Texas; West University; Southwest	
(California) Manhattan Beach, California; Manhattan Beach; West

== Results ==
Group A

Team	W	L	Rs	Ra
New Jersey	4	0	40	19
Maine	3	1	30	13
Texas	2	2	21	19
Italy	1	3	20	33
Canada	0	4	11	38

	(Canada)	(Italy)	(Maine)	(New Jersey)	(Texas)
Canada	–	6–13	0–8	0–10	5–7
Italy	13–6	–	0–13	6–11	1–3
Maine	8–0	13–0	–	5–10	4–3
New Jersey	10–0	11–6	10–5	–	9–8^{(10)}
Texas	7–5	3–1	3–4	8–9^{(10)}	–

Group B

Team	W	L	Rs	Ra
California	4	0	24	7
Aruba	3	1	35	13
Ohio	2	2	30	29
Florida	1	3	12	26
Northern Mariana Islands	0	4	13	39

	(Aruba)	(California)	(Florida)	(Northern Mariana Islands)	(Ohio)
Aruba	–	3–5^{(8)}	7–3	8–4	17–1
California	5–3^{(8)}	–	2–1	11–0	6–3^{(9)}
Florida	3–7	1–2	–	6–5	2–12
Northern Mariana Islands	4–8	0–11	5–6	–	4–14
Ohio	1–17	3–6^{(9)}	12–2	14–4	–

Elimination Round

Semifinals
4–0	New Jersey	2
3–1	Aruba	3
4–0	California	3
3–1	Maine	9

World Championship
4–1	Aruba	8
4–1	Maine	1

2010 Senior League World Series Champions
Aruba South LL
San Nicolaas, Aruba
