= 2018 Senior League World Series =

American youth baseball tournament

Tournament details
- Country: United States
- City: Easley, South Carolina
- Dates: 28 July – 4 August 2018
- Teams: 12

Final positions
- Champions: Willemstad, Curaçao
- Runner-up: Wilmington, Delaware

The 2018 Senior League World Series took place from July 28–August 4 in Easley, South Carolina. Willemstad, Curaçao defeated Wilmington, Delaware in the championship game.

== Teams ==
United States	International
(South Carolina) Easley, South Carolina; District 1 Host	Saipan, Northern Mariana Islands; Saipan; Asia–Pacific
(Michigan) Grand Rapids, Michigan; Southern; Central	Sydney, New South Wales; Cronulla; Australia
Wilmington, Delaware; Naamans; East	Edmonton, Alberta; Confederation Park; Canada
(Florida) Coral Springs, Florida; North Springs; Southeast	(Curaçao) Willemstad, Curaçao; Pariba; Caribbean
(Texas) Waco, West Texas; Waco Southern; Southwest	Bologna, Italy; Emilia Romagna; Europe–Africa
(Hawaii) Wailuku, Hawaii; Central East Maui; West	Barquisimeto, Venezuela; Cardenales; Latin America

== Results ==
United States Bracket

—
—	Michigan	3
—	Florida	7
—	South Carolina	3
—	Hawaii	6
Lower round 1
0–1	Michigan	3
1–1	Hawaii	2
0–1	Texas	0
0–1	South Carolina	2

—
1–0	Florida	10
—	Texas	2
1–0	Hawaii	3
—	Delaware	5
Lower round 2
1–1	Michigan	3
1–1	South Carolina (F/10)	4

—
2–0	Florida	3
1–0	Delaware	4
Lower final
2–1	Florida	2
2–1	South Carolina	1

United States Championship
2–0	Delaware	6
3–1	Florida	3

International Bracket

—
—	Canada	1
—	Italy (F/11)	2
—	Australia	2
—	Venezuela	4
Lower round 1
0–1	Canada	8
0–1	Northern Mariana Islands	0
1–1	Italy	2
0–1	Australia	1

—
1–0	Italy	10
—	Curaçao	11
1–0	Venezuela	7
—	Northern Mariana Islands	0
Lower round 2
1–1	Canada	1
2–1	Italy	8

—
1–0	Curaçao	6
2–0	Venezuela	4
Lower final
2–1	Venezuela	4
3–1	Italy	9

International Championship
2–0	Curaçao	9
4–1	Italy	5

Elimination Round

Semifinals
2–0	Delaware	6
3–1	Florida	3
2–0	Curaçao	9
4–1	Italy	5

World Championship
3–0	Delaware	2
3–0	Curaçao	7

2018 Senior League World Series Champions
Pariba LL
Willemstad, Curaçao
