= 2008 Senior League World Series =

American youth baseball tournament

Tournament information
- Location: Bangor, Maine
- Dates: August 10–16, 2008

Final positions
- Champions: Upper Deerfield, New Jersey
- Runner-up: Willemstad, Curaçao

The 2008 Senior League World Series took place from August 10–16 in Bangor, Maine, United States. Upper Deerfield, New Jersey defeated Willemstad, Curaçao in the championship game.

== Teams ==
United States	International
(Maine) Bangor, Maine; District 3 Host	(Philippines) Makati, Philippines; Illam Central; Asia–Pacific
(Ohio) New Philadelphia, Ohio; Tuscarawas County; Central	(British Columbia) Surrey, British Columbia; Whalley; Canada
(New Jersey) Upper Deerfield, New Jersey; North Cumberland; East	(Lithuania) Vilnius, Lithuania; Vilnius; EMEA
(Florida) Boynton Beach, Florida; East Boynton Beach; Southeast	(Curaçao) Willemstad, Curaçao; Pabao; Latin America
(Texas) Bryan, Texas; Bryan National West; Southwest	
(Hawaii) Pearl City, Hawaii; Pearl City; West

== Results ==
=== Group A ===
Team	W	L	Rs	Ra
Florida	4	0	24	15
Canada	3	1	15	7
Hawaii	2	2	21	16
Maine	1	3	31	31
Philippines	0	4	7	29

	(Canada)	(Florida)	(Hawaii)	(Maine)	(Philippines)
Canada	–	2–3	2–1	7–2	4–1
Florida	3–2	–	5–2	10–9^{(8)}	6–2
Hawaii	1–2	2–5	–	13–6	5–3
Maine	2–7	9–10^{(8)}	6–13	–	14–1
Philippines	1–4	2–6	3–5	1–14	–

=== Group B ===
Team	W	L	Rs	Ra
New Jersey	4	0	40	7
Curaçao	2	2	17	11
Ohio	2	2	20	19
Texas	2	2	13	23
Lithuania	0	4	3	33

	(Curaçao)	(Lithuania)	(New Jersey)	(Ohio)	(Texas)
Curaçao	–	9–0	4–5	4–3	0–3
Lithuania	0–9	–	0–7	1–9	2–8
New Jersey	5–4	7–0	–	13–2	15–1
Ohio	3–4	9–1	2–13	–	6–1
Texas	3–0	8–2	1–15	1–6	–

=== Elimination round ===
Semifinals
4–0	Florida	7
2–2	Curaçao	8
4–0	New Jersey	1
3–1	Canada	0

World Championship
3–2	Curaçao	8
5–0	New Jersey	10

2008 Senior League World Series Champions
North Cumberland LL
Upper Deerfield, New Jersey
