= 1976 Senior League World Series =

American youth baseball tournament

Tournament information
- Location: Gary, Indiana
- Dates: August 17–21, 1976

Final positions
- Champions: Pingtung, Taiwan
- Runner-up: Aiea, Hawaii

The 1976 Senior League World Series took place from August 17–21 in Gary, Indiana, United States. Pingtung, Taiwan defeated Aiea, Hawaii twice in the championship game. It was Taiwan's fifth straight championship.

== Teams ==
United States	International
(Delaware) New Castle, Delaware East	Surrey, British Columbia; Whalley; Canada
(Michigan) Grand Rapids, Michigan North	(West Germany) Wiesbaden, West Germany Europe
(Virginia) Richmond, Virginia South	(Taiwan) Pingtung, Taiwan Far East
(Hawaii) Aiea, Hawaii West	Santo Domingo, Dominican Republic Latin America

== Results ==
Upper round 1	Upper round 2	Upper final	World Championship
—	Hawaii	4
—	Taiwan	3
1–0	Hawaii	11
1–0	Virginia	4
—	Virginia	10
—	West Germany	0
2–0	Hawaii	2
2–0	Michigan	1
—	Canada	0
—	Michigan (F/14)	2
1–0	Michigan	3
1–0	Delaware	2
—	Dominican Republic	0
—	Delaware	5	3–0	Hawaii	5	5
4–1	Taiwan	12	14
Lower round 1	Lower round 2	Lower round 3	Lower final
1–1	Delaware	2
0–1	Taiwan	1	1–1	Taiwan	5	2–1	Michigan	0
0–1	West Germany	0	2–1	Taiwan	7	3–1	Taiwan	12
2–1	Virginia	1
1–1	Virginia	11
0–1	Canada	4	1–1	Canada	5
0–1	Dominican Republic	3

1976 Senior League World Series Champions
Pingtung, Taiwan
