= Senior League World Series (Canada Region) =

Canada Region
- Most recent season or competition: 2026 Senior League World Series
- Sport: Baseball
- Founded: 1965
- No. of teams: 7
- Most recent champion: (Quebec) Mirabel, Québec
- Most titles: Ontario (18)

The Senior League World Series Canada Region is one of six International regions that currently sends teams to the World Series in Easley, South Carolina. The region's participation in the SLWS dates back to 1965.

== Canada Region Provinces ==
- Alberta
- British Columbia
- New Brunswick
- Nova Scotia
- Ontario
- Quebec
- Saskatchewan

== Region Champions ==
As of the 2026 Senior League World Series.

Year	City	SLWS	Record
1965	Stoney Creek, Ontario	Round 1	0–1
1966	Fort William, Ontario	Fourth Place	0–2
1967	Fort William, Ontario	Round 2	1–2
1968	Fort William, Ontario	Round 1	0–2
1969	Fort William, Ontario	Round 1	0–2
1970	Windsor, Ontario	Round 3	1–2
1971	Whalley, British Columbia	Round 3	1–2
1972	Windsor, Ontario	Round 2	0–2
1973	Windsor, Ontario	Round 4	1–2
1974	Thunder Bay, Ontario	Round 1	0–2
1975	Thunder Bay, Ontario	Round 2	1–2
1976	Surrey, British Columbia	Round 2	1–2
1977	Lethbridge, Alberta	Round 1	0–2
1978	Surrey, British Columbia	Round 1	0–2
1979	Lethbridge, Alberta	Round 1	0–2
1980	Thunder Bay, Ontario	Round 1	0–2
1981	Surrey, British Columbia	Round 1	0–2
1982	Lethbridge, Alberta	Fourth Place	2–2
1983	Windsor, Ontario	Round 1	0–2
1984	Calgary, Alberta	Round 1	0–2
1985	Lethbridge, Alberta	Round 2	1–2
1986	Vancouver, British Columbia	Round 1	0–2
1987	Salaberry-de-Valleyfield, Quebec	Round 2	1–2
1988	Surrey, British Columbia	Round 1	0–2
1989	Surrey, British Columbia	Runner-up	3–2
1990	Edmonton, Alberta	Round 2	1–3
1991	LaSalle, Ontario	Round 1	0–3
1992	Surrey, British Columbia	Round 3	2–3
1993	Calgary, Alberta	Round 2	1–3
1994	Calgary, Alberta	Round 1	0–3
1995	Langley, British Columbia	Round 3	2–3
1996	North Vancouver, British Columbia	Round 2	1–3
1997	LaSalle, Ontario	Round 3	2–3
1998	Surrey, British Columbia	Fourth Place	3–3
1999	Surrey, British Columbia	Round 2	2–2
2000	Surrey, British Columbia	Round 2	0–3
2001	Surrey, British Columbia	Round 2	1–3
2002	LaSalle, Ontario	Pool stage	2–2
2003	Calgary, Alberta	Pool stage	1–3
2004	Surrey, British Columbia	Pool stage	2–2
2005	Thunder Bay, Ontario	Pool stage	1–3
2006	Regina, Saskatchewan	Pool stage	1–3
2007	Surrey, British Columbia (Host)	Pool stage	2–2
2008	Surrey, British Columbia	Semifinals	3–2
2009	Cornwall, Ontario	Pool stage	0–4
2010	Edmonton, Alberta	Pool stage	0–4
2011	Montréal, Quebec	Pool stage	0–4
2012	Montréal, Quebec	Pool stage	1–3
2013	Cape Breton, Nova Scotia	Pool stage	1–3
2014	Regina, Saskatchewan	Pool stage	1–3
2015	Regina, Saskatchewan	Round 1	0–3
2016	Regina, Saskatchewan	Round 2	1–3
2017	Surrey, British Columbia	Round 1	0–3
2018	Edmonton, Alberta (Host)	Round 2	1–2
2019	(Quebec) Mirabel, Québec	Round 2	1–2
2020	Cancelled due to COVID-19 pandemic		
2021	Cancelled due to COVID-19 pandemic		
2022	(Quebec) Mirabel, Québec	Round 2	2–2
2023	Ottawa, Ontario	Round 1	0–2
2024	(Quebec) Mirabel, Québec	Int'l Final	3–2
2025	(Quebec) Mirabel, Québec	Round 1	0–2
2026	(Quebec) Mirabel, Québec	Round 3	2–2

=== Results by Province ===
As of the 2026 Senior League World Series.

Province	Region Championships	SLWS Championships	W–L	PCT
Ontario	18	0	9–40	.184
British Columbia	17	0	21–41	.339
Alberta	10	0	6–26	.188
Quebec	8	0	10–19	.345
Saskatchewan	4	0	3–12	.200
(British Columbia) (Alberta) Host Team(s)	2	0	3–4	.429
Nova Scotia	1	0	1–3	.250
Total	60	0	53–145	.268

== See also ==
- Baseball awards#World

Canada Region in other Little League divisions

- Little League
- Intermediate League
- Junior League
- Big League
