= 1964 Senior League World Series =

American youth baseball tournament

Tournament information
- Location: Louisville, Kentucky
- Dates: August 20–22, 1964

Final positions
- Champions: (New York (state)) Massapequa, New York
- Runner-up: Brenham, Texas

The 1964 Senior League World Series took place from August 20–22 in Louisville, Kentucky, United States. Massapequa, New York defeated Brenham, Texas in the championship game. This was the only edition held in Louisville.

== Teams ==
United States	International
(New York (state)) Massapequa, New York East	Monterrey, Mexico Mexico
(Iowa) Des Moines, Iowa; Windsor; North	
(Texas) Brenham, Texas South
(Arizona) Superior, Arizona West

== Results ==
Opening Round
—	Mexico	3
—	(New York (state)) New York	4

Semifinals
1–0	(New York (state)) New York	6
—	Iowa	4
—	Texas	5
—	Arizona	3

Championship
2–0	(New York (state)) New York	2
1–0	Texas	1

1964 Senior League World Series Champions
Massapequa, New York
