= 1984 Senior League World Series =

American youth baseball tournament

Tournament information
- Location: Gary, Indiana
- Dates: August 13–18, 1984

Final positions
- Champions: Altamonte Springs, Florida
- Runner-up: Pingtung, Taiwan

The 1984 Senior League World Series took place from August 13–18 in Gary, Indiana, United States. Altamonte Springs, Florida defeated Pingtung, Taiwan in the championship game.

== Teams ==
United States	International
(Delaware) Seaford, Delaware; Nanticoke; East	Calgary, Alberta Canada
(Michigan) Midland, Michigan North	(England) London, England Europe
(Florida) Altamonte Springs, Florida South	(Taiwan) Pingtung, Taiwan Far East
(California) Walnut Creek, California West	(Dominican Republic) Dominican Republic Latin America

== Results ==
Upper round 1	Upper round 2	Upper final	Championship
—	Taiwan	5
—	Dominican Republic	4
1–0	Taiwan	3
1–0	California	7
—	Canada	0
—	California	8
2–0	California	5
2–0	Florida	10
—	Delaware	1
—	Florida	7
1–0	Florida	4
1–0	Michigan	1
—	Michigan	19
—	England	2	3–0	Florida	10	—
4–1	Taiwan	7	—
Lower round 1	Lower round 2	Lower round 3	Lower final
1–1	Michigan	4
0–1	Dominican Republic	3	1–1	Dominican Republic	17	2–1	California	3
0–1	Canada	1	2–1	Dominican Republic	5	3–1	Taiwan	8
2–1	Taiwan	7
1–1	Taiwan	11
0–1	Delaware	14	1–1	Delaware	2
0–1	England	0

1984 Senior League World Series Champions
Altamonte Springs, Florida
