= 1977 Senior League World Series =

American youth baseball tournament

Tournament information
- Location: Gary, Indiana
- Dates: August 15–20, 1977

Final positions
- Champions: Taipei, Taiwan
- Runner-up: Orlando, Florida

The 1977 Senior League World Series took place from August 15–20 in Gary, Indiana, United States. Taipei, Taiwan defeated Orlando, Florida in the championship game. It was Taiwan's sixth straight championship.

== Teams ==
United States	International
(New York (state)) Sayville, New York East	(Alberta) Lethbridge, Alberta Canada
(Wisconsin) Madison, Wisconsin; West Madison; North	(Spain) Madrid, Spain; Torrejón Air Base; Europe
(Florida) Orlando, Florida South	(Taiwan) Taipei, Taiwan Far East
San Jose, California West	Aruba, Netherlands Antilles Latin America

== Results ==
Upper round 1	Upper round 2	Upper final	World Championship
—	Florida	1
—	Wisconsin	0
1–0	Florida (F/8)	6
1–0	Netherlands Antilles	4
—	Netherlands Antilles	3
—	Spain	1
2–0	Florida	1
2–0	Taiwan	6
—	(New York (state)) New York	3
—	California	14
1–0	California	0
1–0	Taiwan	7
—	Canada	1
—	Taiwan	10	3–0	Taiwan	5	—
3–1	Florida	1	—
Lower round 1	Lower round 2	Lower round 3	Lower final
1–1	California
0–1	Wisconsin	8	1–1	Wisconsin	2–1	Florida	12
0–1	Spain	2	2–1	Wisconsin	5	3–1	Wisconsin	0
2–1	Netherlands Antilles	2
1–1	Netherlands Antilles
0–1	(New York (state)) New York	4	1–1	(New York (state)) New York
0–1	Canada	0

1977 Senior League World Series Champions
Taipei, Taiwan
