= 2004 Senior League World Series =

American youth baseball tournament

Tournament information
- Location: Bangor, Maine
- Dates: August 15–21, 2004

Final positions
- Champions: Freehold Township, New Jersey
- Runner-up: El Rio, California

The 2004 Senior League World Series took place from August 15–21 in Bangor, Maine, United States. Freehold Township, New Jersey defeated El Rio, California in the championship game.

== Teams ==
United States	International
(Maine) Bangor, Maine; District 3 Host	(Northern Mariana Islands) Saipan, Northern Mariana Islands; Saipan; Asia–Pacific
(Illinois) Chicago, Illinois; Humboldt Park; Central	(British Columbia) Surrey, British Columbia; Whalley; Canada
(New Jersey) Freehold Township, New Jersey; Freehold Township; East	(Netherlands) Rotterdam, Netherlands; Windmills; EMEA
(Florida) Dade City, Florida; Dade City; Southeast	(Venezuela) Maracaibo, Venezuela; San Francisco; Latin America
(Texas) San Antonio, Texas; Greater Helotes; Southwest	
(California) El Rio, California; El Rio; West

== Results ==
Group A

Team	W	L	Rs	Ra
Florida	3	1	31	17
California	3	1	34	21
Canada	2	2	20	28
Northern Mariana Islands	2	2	23	24
Maine	0	4	22	38

	(California)	(Canada)	(Florida)	(Maine)	(Northern Mariana Islands)
California	–	10–7	5–6	13–5	7–3
Canada	7–10	–	2–12	7–5	4–1
Florida	6–5	12–2	–	8–4	5–6
Maine	5–13	5–7	4–8	–	8–10
Northern Mariana Islands	3–7	1–4	6–5	10–8	–

Group B

Team	W	L	Rs	Ra
Venezuela	3	1	31	6
New Jersey	3	1	37	11
Illinois	2	2	23	17
Texas	2	2	12	21
Netherlands	0	4	5	53

	(Illinois)	(Netherlands)	(New Jersey)	(Texas)	(Venezuela)
Illinois	–	11–1	4–7	6–4	2–5
Netherlands	1–11	–	2–16	2–5	0–21
New Jersey	7–4	16–2	–	12–1	2–4^{(9)}
Texas	4–6	5–2	1–12	–	2–1
Venezuela	5–2	21–0	4–2^{(9)}	1–2	–

Elimination Round

Semifinals
3–1	Florida	0
3–1	New Jersey	1
3–1	Venezuela	0
3–1	California	1

World Championship
4–1	New Jersey	10
4–1	California	1

2004 Senior League World Series Champions
Freehold Township LL
Freehold Township, New Jersey
