= 2007 Senior League World Series =

American youth baseball tournament

Tournament information
- Location: Bangor, Maine
- Dates: August 12–18, 2007

Final positions
- Champions: (Georgia (U.S. state)) Cartersville, Georgia
- Runner-up: Punto Fijo, Venezuela

The 2007 Senior League World Series took place from August 12–18 in Bangor, Maine, United States. Cartersville, Georgia defeated Punto Fijo, Venezuela in the championship game.

== Teams ==
United States	International
(Maine) Bangor, Maine; District 3 Host	(Northern Mariana Islands) Saipan, Northern Mariana Islands; Saipan; Asia–Pacific
(Michigan) Niles, Michigan; Greater Niles; Central	(British Columbia) Surrey, British Columbia; Whalley; Canada
(New Jersey) Freehold Township, New Jersey; Freehold Township; East	(Lithuania) Vilnius, Lithuania; Vilnius; EMEA
(Georgia (U.S. state)) Cartersville, Georgia; Cartersville; Southeast	(Venezuela) Punto Fijo, Venezuela; Paraguana; Latin America
(Texas) Tyler, Texas; Rose Capital East; Southwest	
(Hawaii) Hilo, Hawaii; Hilo; West

== Results ==
Group A

Team	W	L	Rs	Ra
Hawaii	4	0	34	11
(Georgia (U.S. state)) Georgia	2	2	25	11
Canada	2	2	25	19
Northern Mariana Islands	2	2	25	43
Maine	0	4	19	44

	(Canada)	(Georgia (U.S. state))	(Hawaii)	(Maine)	(Northern Mariana Islands)
Canada	–	0–10	5–6	10–2	10–1
Georgia (Georgia (U.S. state))	10–0	–	0–5	11–1	4–5
Hawaii	6–5	5–0	–	6–4	17–2
Maine	2–10	1–11	4–6	–	12–17^{(9)}
Northern Mariana Islands	1–10	5–4	2–17	17–12^{(9)}	–

Group B

Team	W	L	Rs	Ra
Texas	3	0	30	2
Venezuela	3	1	33	17
New Jersey	2	2	17	19
Michigan	1	2	19	24
Lithuania	0	4	4	41

	(Lithuania)	(Michigan)	(New Jersey)	(Texas)	(Venezuela)
Lithuania	–	2–12	1–4	1–10	0–15
Michigan	12–2	–	1–10	ppd.	6–12
New Jersey	4–1	10–1	–	1–11	2–6
Texas	10–1	ppd.	11–1	–	9–0
Venezuela	15–0	12–6	6–2	0–9	–

Elimination Round

Semifinals
4–0	Hawaii	4
3–1	Venezuela (F/9)	5
3–0	Texas	1
2–2	(Georgia (U.S. state)) Georgia	4

World Championship
4–1	Venezuela	0
3–2	(Georgia (U.S. state)) Georgia	9

2007 Senior League World Series Champions
Cartersville LL
Cartersville, Georgia
