= 2023 Senior League World Series =

Tournament details
- Country: United States
- City: Easley, South Carolina
- Dates: July 29 – August 5, 2023
- Teams: 12

Final positions
- Champions: Willemstad, Curaçao
- Runners-up: Cherry Hill, New Jersey

The 2023 Senior League World Series took place from July 29–August 5 in Easley, South Carolina. Willemstad, Curaçao defeated Cherry Hill, New Jersey in the championship game.

== Teams ==
United States	International
(South Carolina) Easley, South Carolina; District 1 (Easley); Host	(New Zealand) Auckland, New Zealand; Auckland Baseball Association; Asia–Pacific
(Illinois) Burbank, Illinois; Burbank American/National; Central	(New South Wales) Sydney, New South Wales; Ryde North; Australia
(New Jersey) Cherry Hill, New Jersey; Cherry Hill Atlantic; East	(Ontario) Ottawa, Ontario; East Nepean; Canada
(South Carolina) Irmo, South Carolina; Irmo; Southeast	(Curaçao) Willemstad, Curaçao; Pabao; Caribbean
(Texas) Weslaco, Texas; Weslaco; Southwest	(Netherlands) Haarlem, Netherlands; Kennemerland; Europe–Africa
(Hawaii) Wailuku, Hawaii; Central East Maui; West	(Mexico) (Tamaulipas) Matamoros, Mexico; Matamoros; Latin America

== Results ==
United States Bracket

Upper round 1
Hawaii	11
Texas	2
(South Carolina) Host	3
Illinois	2
Lower round 1
Texas	4
South Carolina	3
Illinois	0
Hawaii (F/5)	12

Upper round 2
New Jersey	6
Hawaii	1
South Carolina	2
(South Carolina) Host	3
Lower round 2
Texas	1
Hawaii	6

Upper final
New Jersey	6
(South Carolina) Host	5
Lower final
(South Carolina) Host	0
Hawaii	4

United States Championship
New Jersey (F/5)	12
Hawaii	2

International Bracket

Upper round 1
Netherlands (F/5)	11
Canada	1
New Zealand	1
Mexico	4
Lower round 1
Mexico	5
Canada	1
New Zealand	4
Netherlands	6

Upper round 2
Curaçao	16
Netherlands	13
Australia	3
Mexico	1
Lower round 2
Mexico	2
Netherlands	0

Upper final
Curaçao (F/5)	10
Australia	0
Lower final
Australia	0
Mexico	4

International Championship
Curaçao	12
Mexico	3

World Championship

World Championship
New Jersey	1
Curaçao (F/5)	14

2023 Senior League World Series Champions
Pabao LL
Willemstad, Curaçao
