= 2001 Senior League World Series =

American youth baseball tournament

Tournament information
- Location: Kissimmee, Florida
- Dates: August 12–18, 2001

Final positions
- Champions: Palm Harbor, Florida
- Runner-up: Maracaibo, Venezuela

The 2001 Senior League World Series took place from August 12–18 in Kissimmee, Florida, United States. Palm Harbor, Florida defeated Maracaibo, Venezuela in the championship game.

This was the final SLWS held in Kissimmee.

== Teams ==
United States	International
(Florida) Kissimmee, Florida; District 3 Host	(British Columbia) Surrey, British Columbia; Whalley; Canada
(Michigan) Kalamazoo, Michigan; Eastwood; Central	(Germany) Ramstein, Germany; KMC; Europe
(New Jersey) Vineland, New Jersey; South Vineland; East	(Guam) Hagåtña, Guam; Central; Far East
(Florida) Palm Harbor, Florida; Palm Harbor American; South	(Venezuela) Maracaibo, Venezuela; Coquivacoa; Latin America
(California) Sunnyvale, California; Sunnyvale; West	

== Results ==
=== Winner's Bracket ===
Opening Game
—	(Florida) Host	4
—	Germany	2

—
1–0	(Florida) Host	1
—	California	5
—	Florida	9
—	Michigan	3
—	Guam	1
—	Venezuela	11
—	Canada	3
—	New Jersey	5

—
1–0	California	0
1–0	Florida	1
1–0	Venezuela	4
1–0	New Jersey	3

Bracket Final
2–0	Florida	5
2–0	Venezuela	1

=== Loser's Bracket ===
—
0–1	Germany	5
0–1	Michigan	1
0–1	Guam	0
0–1	Canada	7

—
1–1	(Florida) Host (F/10)	5
1–1	Canada	4
1–1	New Jersey	4
1–1	Michigan	5

—
1–1	California	8
2–1	(Florida) Host	5
2–1	Venezuela	8
2–1	Michigan	5

Bracket Final
2–1	California	5
3–1	Venezuela	8

=== Placement Bracket ===
First round
0–2	Germany	4
0–2	Guam	10

Second round
1–2	Canada	6
1–2	Guam (F/8)	7
1–2	New Jersey	8
2–2	Michigan	4

Third round
2–2	(Florida) Host	7
2–2	Guam	12
2–2	California	8
2–2	New Jersey	1

Third-place game
3–2	Guam	5
3–2	California	12

Elimination Round

Semifinals
2–0	Florida	5
2–0	Venezuela	1
2–1	California	5
3–1	Venezuela	8

World championship
3–0	Florida	7
4–1	Venezuela	4
Third-place game
3–2	Guam	5
3–2	California	12

2001 Senior League World Series Champions
Palm Harbor American LL
Palm Harbor, Florida

== Notable players ==
- Troy Tulowitzki (Sunnyvale, California) - MLB shortstop
- Tyler Clippard (Palm Harbor, Florida) - MLB pitcher
