= 2022 Senior League World Series =

American youth baseball tournament

Tournament details
- Country: United States
- City: Easley, South Carolina
- Dates: 30 July – 6 August 2022
- Teams: 12

Final positions
- Champions: Guayama, Puerto Rico
- Runners-up: Norfolk, Virginia

The 2022 Senior League World Series took place from July 30–August 6 in Easley, South Carolina. Guayama, Puerto Rico defeated Norfolk, Virginia in the championship game. This was the first Senior Little League World Series held since the COVID-19 pandemic.

== Teams ==
United States	International
(South Carolina) Easley, South Carolina; District 1 (Easley); Host	Guam; Guam District 1 Asia–Pacific
(Illinois) Burbank, Illinois; Burbank American; Central	(Victoria (state)) Melbourne, Victoria; Eastern Athletics Baseball Charter; Australia
(New Jersey) Vineland, New Jersey; East Vineland; East	(Quebec) Mirabel, Quebec; Diamond Baseball; Canada
(Virginia) Norfolk, Virginia; Fleet Park; Southeast	Guayama, Puerto Rico; Radamés López; Caribbean
(Texas) Houston, Texas; West University; Southwest	(Italy) Nettuno, Italy; Lazio; Europe–Africa
(Hawaii) Wailuku, Hawaii; Central East Maui; West	(Panama) (Coclé) Aguadulce, Panama; Aguadulce Cabezera; Latin America

== Results ==
United States Bracket

Upper round 1
Virginia (F/5)	12
Hawaii	2
New Jersey	2
(South Carolina) Host (F/10)	4
Lower round 1
Hawaii	6
(South Carolina) Host	7
New Jersey (F/5)	20
Illinois	6

Upper round 2
Illinois	3
Virginia	10
Texas	7
(South Carolina) Host	1
Lower round 2
(South Carolina) Host	0
New Jersey	8

Upper final
Virginia	6
Texas	1
Lower final
Texas	7
New Jersey	4

United States Championship
Virginia	2
Texas	1

International Bracket

Upper round 1
Canada (F/6)	13
Guam	3
Puerto Rico	8
Italy	3
Lower round 1
Guam	1
Australia (F/5)	11
Italy	0
Canada	6

Upper round 2
Panama	12
Canada	10
Australia	1
Puerto Rico (F/5)	19
Lower round 2
Australia	5
Canada	1

Upper final
Panama	3
Puerto Rico	10
Lower final
Panama	5
Australia	1

International Championship
Puerto Rico	5
Panama	1

World Championship

World Championship
Virginia	5
Puerto Rico	10

2022 Senior League World Series Champions
Radamés López LL
Guayama, Puerto Rico
