= 2013 Senior League World Series =

American youth baseball tournament

Tournament information
- Location: Bangor, Maine
- Dates: August 11–17, 2013

Final positions
- Champions: Chitré, Panama
- Runner-up: Kennett Square, Pennsylvania

The 2013 Senior League World Series took place from August 11–17 in Bangor, Maine, United States. Chitré, Panama defeated Kennett Square, Pennsylvania in the championship game.

== Teams ==
United States	International
(Maine) Bangor, Maine; District 3 Host	(Philippines) Makati, Philippines; Illam Central; Asia–Pacific
(Illinois) Chicago, Illinois; Clear Ridge; Central	(Nova Scotia) Cape Breton, Nova Scotia; Cape Breton; Canada
(Pennsylvania) Kennett Square, Pennsylvania; Kennett Square; East	(Italy) Emilia, Italy; Emilia; Europe–Africa
(Georgia (U.S. state)) Martinez, Georgia; Martinez-Evans; Southeast	(Panama) Chitré, Panama; Chitré; Latin America
(Texas) Laredo, Texas; Northside; Southwest	
(Hawaii) Pearl City, Hawaii; Pearl City; West

== Results ==
Group A

Team	W	L	Rs	Ra
Hawaii	4	0	34	2
(Georgia (U.S. state)) Georgia	3	1	16	4
Philippines	1	3	17	17
Maine	1	3	7	26
Canada	1	3	10	37

	(Canada)	(Georgia (U.S. state))	(Hawaii)	(Maine)	(Philippines)
Canada	–	0–10	1–11	8–1	1–15
Georgia (Georgia (U.S. state))	10–0	–	0–1	4–2	2–1
Hawaii	11–1	1–0	–	11–1	11–0
Maine	1–8	2–4	1–11	–	3–1
Philippines	15–1	1–2	0–11	1–3	–

Group B

Team	W	L	Rs	Ra
Panama	4	0	16	4
Pennsylvania	3	1	27	12
Texas	2	2	20	12
Italy	1	3	13	23
Illinois	0	4	10	35

	(Illinois)	(Italy)	(Panama)	(Pennsylvania)	(Texas)
Illinois	–	4–8	0–6	4–9	2–12
Italy	8–4	–	0–3	1–11	4–5
Panama	6–0	3–0	–	5–3	2–1
Pennsylvania	9–4	11–1	3–5	–	4–2
Texas	12–2	5–4	1–2	2–4	–

Elimination Round

Semifinals
4–0	Hawaii	3
3–1	Pennsylvania	9
4–0	Panama (F/12)	5
3–1	(Georgia (U.S. state)) Georgia	4

World Championship
4–1	Pennsylvania	1
5–0	Panama	2

2013 Senior League World Series Champions
Chitré LL
Chitré, Panama
