= 2015 Senior League World Series =

American youth baseball tournament

Tournament information
- Location: Bangor, Maine
- Dates: August 2–8, 2015

Final positions
- Champions: Houston, Texas
- Runner-up: Holmes County, Ohio

The 2015 Senior League World Series took place from August 2–8 in Bangor, Maine, United States. Houston, Texas defeated Holmes County, Ohio in the championship game. It was the second straight title for Houston's West University Little League.

A modified double-elimination format was introduced this year.

== Teams ==
United States	International
(Maine) Bangor, Maine; District 3 Host	(Northern Mariana Islands) Saipan, Northern Mariana Islands; Saipan; Asia–Pacific
(Ohio) Holmes County, Ohio; East Holmes; Central	(Saskatchewan) Regina, Saskatchewan; Kiwanis National/North Regina; Canada
(Pennsylvania) Upper Moreland, Pennsylvania; Upper Moreland; East	(Italy) Lazio, Italy; Lazio; Europe–Africa
(Virginia) Dumfries, Virginia; Dumfries; Southeast	(Curaçao) Willemstad, Curaçao; Pariba; Latin America
(Texas) Houston, Texas; West University; Southwest	
(Arizona) Nogales, Arizona; Nogales National; West

== Results ==
Group A

—
—	Arizona	4
—	Texas (F/12)	5
Lower round 1
0–1	Arizona	3
0–1	Curaçao	7

—
1–0	Texas	8
—	Virginia	2
—	Curaçao	0
—	Pennsylvania (F/10)	3
Lower round 2
0–1	Virginia	9
1–1	Curaçao	6

—
2–0	Texas	1
1–0	Pennsylvania	5
Lower final
2–1	Texas	4
1–1	Virginia	2

Bracket Final
2–0	Pennsylvania	1
3–1	Texas	4

Group B

—
—	Italy	5
—	Northern Mariana Islands	10
Lower round 1
0–1	Canada	3
0–1	Italy	6

—
1–0	Northern Mariana Islands	2
—	Maine	6
—	Canada	3
—	Ohio	6
Lower round 2
1–1	Northern Mariana Islands	8
1–1	Italy	4

—
1–0	Maine	2
1–0	Ohio	13
Lower final
1–1	Maine	11
2–1	Northern Mariana Islands	8

Bracket Final
2–0	Ohio	9
2–1	Maine	2

Consolation round

—
1–2	Curaçao	6
0–2	Canada	1

—
0–2	Arizona (F/8)	6
1–2	Italy	5

Elimination Round

Semifinals
2–0	Pennsylvania	1
3–1	Texas	4
2–0	Ohio	9
2–1	Maine	2

World Championship
4–1	Texas	8
3–0	Ohio	1

2015 Senior League World Series Champions
West University LL
Houston, Texas
