= 1983 Senior League World Series =

American youth baseball tournament

Tournament information
- Location: Gary, Indiana
- Dates: August 15–20, 1983

Final positions
- Champions: Pingtung, Taiwan
- Runner-up: Curaçao, Netherlands Antilles

The 1983 Senior League World Series took place from August 15–20 in Gary, Indiana, United States. Pingtung, Taiwan defeated Curaçao, Netherlands Antilles in the championship game.

== Teams ==
United States	International
(Delaware) Seaford, Delaware East	Windsor, Ontario Canada
(Indiana) Fort Wayne, Indiana North	(Belgium) Brussels, Belgium Europe
(Tennessee) Nashville, Tennessee; Donelson; South	(Taiwan) Pingtung, Taiwan Far East
(California) San Ramon, California West	(Netherlands Antilles) Curaçao, Netherlands Antilles Latin America

== Results ==
Upper round 1	Upper round 2	Upper final	Championship
—	Taiwan	7
—	Delaware	3
1–0	Taiwan	7
1–0	Tennessee	0
—	Belgium	3
—	Tennessee	4
2–0	Taiwan	9
2–0	Netherlands Antilles	2
—	California	9
—	Netherlands Antilles	15
1–0	Netherlands Antilles	4
1–0	Indiana	0
—	Indiana	6
—	Canada	3	3–0	Taiwan	6	—
3–1	Netherlands Antilles	4	—
Lower round 1	Lower round 2	Lower round 3	Lower final
1–1	Indiana	5
0–1	Delaware (F/11)	1	1–1	Delaware	12	2–1	Netherlands Antilles	5
0–1	Belgium	0	2–1	Delaware	8	3–1	Delaware	1
2–1	California	6
1–1	Tennessee	1
0–1	California	7	1–1	California	2
0–1	Canada	0

1983 Senior League World Series Champions
Pingtung, Taiwan
