= 2005 Senior League World Series =

American youth baseball tournament

Tournament information
- Location: Bangor, Maine
- Dates: August 13–20, 2005

Final positions
- Champions: Urbandale, Iowa
- Runner-up: Pearl City, Hawaii

The 2005 Senior League World Series took place from August 13–20 in Bangor, Maine, United States. Urbandale, Iowa defeated Pearl City, Hawaii in the championship game.

== Teams ==
| United States | International |
|---|---|
| (Maine) Bangor, Maine; District 3 Host | (Guam) Hagåtña, Guam; Central; Asia–Pacific |
| (Iowa) Urbandale, Iowa; Urbandale; Central | (Ontario) Thunder Bay, Ontario; Westfort International; Canada |
| (New Jersey) Freehold Township, New Jersey; Freehold Township; East | (Georgia (country)) Tbilisi, Georgia; Georgia YMCA; EMEA |
| (Georgia (U.S. state)) Clarkesville, Georgia; Habersham; Southeast | (Panama) Santiago, Panama; Activo 20-30; Latin America |
| (Louisiana) Marksville, Louisiana; Marksville; Southwest | |
(Hawaii) Pearl City, Hawaii; Pearl City; West

== Results ==
Group A

| Team | W | L | Rs | Ra |
|---|---|---|---|---|
| Hawaii | 4 | 0 | 28 | 16 |
| (Georgia (U.S. state)) Georgia | 2 | 2 | 20 | 24 |
| Guam | 2 | 2 | 20 | 20 |
| Maine | 1 | 3 | 12 | 20 |
| Canada | 1 | 3 | 22 | 22 |

| | (Canada) | (Georgia (U.S. state)) | (Guam) | (Hawaii) | (Maine) |
|---|---|---|---|---|---|
| Canada | – | 10–6 | 6–8 | 5–6 | 1–2 |
| Georgia (Georgia (U.S. state)) | 6–10 | – | 7–5 | 3–6 | 4–3 |
| Guam | 8–6 | 5–7 | – | 3–5^{(10)} | 4–2 |
| Hawaii | 6–5 | 6–3 | 5–3^{(10)} | – | 11–5 |
| Maine | 2–1 | 3–4 | 2–4 | 5–11 | – |

Group B

| Team | W | L | Rs | Ra |
|---|---|---|---|---|
| Iowa | 3 | 1 | 22 | 10 |
| New Jersey | 3 | 1 | 34 | 15 |
| Panama | 2 | 2 | 16 | 14 |
| Louisiana | 1 | 3 | 15 | 20 |
| (Georgia (country)) Georgia | 1 | 3 | 8 | 36 |

| | (Georgia (country)) | (Iowa) | (Louisiana) | (New Jersey) | (Panama) |
|---|---|---|---|---|---|
| Georgia (Georgia (country)) | – | 1–11 | 2–10 | 3–14 | 2–1 |
| Iowa | 11–1 | – | 2–1 | 5–2 | 4–6 |
| Louisiana | 10–2 | 1–2 | – | 2–12 | 2–4 |
| New Jersey | 14–3 | 2–5 | 12–2 | – | 6–5^{(9)} |
| Panama | 1–2 | 6–4 | 4–2 | 5–6^{(9)} | – |

Elimination Round

Semifinals
4–0 | Hawaii | 4
3–1 | New Jersey | 3
3–1 | Iowa | 6
2–2 | (Georgia (U.S. state)) Georgia | 2

World Championship
5–0 | Hawaii | 2
4–1 | Iowa | 7

2005 Senior League World Series Champions
Urbandale LL
Urbandale, Iowa
