= Senior League World Series (Asia–Pacific Region) =

Asia–Pacific Region
- Most recent season or competition: 2026 Senior League World Series
- Sport: Baseball
- Founded: 1972
- Most recent champion: Philippines
- Most titles: Taiwan (25)

The Senior League World Series – Asia-Pacific Region (formerly the Far East Region) is one of six international regions that currently send teams to the World Series in Easley, South Carolina. The region's participation in the Senior League World Series (SLWS) dates back to 1972.

It has produced the most championships (17) of any region, all won by Taiwan. Taiwan won nine straight titles from 1972–1980, the longest streak for any Little League division. Taiwan has not competed at the Senior League level since 1996. They won every regional tournament they entered.

== Asia-Pacific Region Countries ==
- China
- Guam
- Hong Kong
- New Zealand
- Northern Mariana Islands
- Philippines

== Region Champions ==
As of the 2026 Senior League World Series.

Year	City	SLWS	Record
1972	Pingtung, Taiwan	Champions	4–0
1973	Taipei, Taiwan	Champions	5–0
1974	Pingtung, Taiwan	Champions	4–0
1975	Pingtung, Taiwan	Champions	4–0
1976	Pingtung, Taiwan	Champions	6–1
1977	Taipei, Taiwan	Champions	4–0
1978	Hualien, Taiwan	Champions	4–0
1979	Taichung, Taiwan	Champions	6–1
1980	Pingtung, Taiwan	Champions	4–0
1981	Taipei, Taiwan	Third Place	3–2
1982	Pingtung, Taiwan	Third Place	3–2
1983	Pingtung, Taiwan	Champions	4–0
1984	Pingtung, Taiwan	Runner-up	4–2
1985	Pingtung, Taiwan	Champions	4–0
1986	Taipei, Taiwan	Champions	4–0
1987	Taipei, Taiwan	Round 2	1–2
1988	Pingtung, Taiwan	Champions	4–0
1989	Pingtung, Taiwan	Champions	6–1
1990	Taipei, Taiwan	Champions	4–0
1991	Pingtung, Taiwan	Champions	5–1
1992	Pingtung, Taiwan	Champions	4–1
1993	Taipei, Taiwan	Runner-up	3–2
1994	Taichung, Taiwan	Third Place	4–2
1995	Taipei, Taiwan	Round 3	3–3
1996	Tainan, Taiwan	Round 3	2–3
1997	Hagåtña, Guam	Round 2	1–3
1998	Hagåtña, Guam	Round 3	1–3
1999	Hagåtña, Guam	Round 3	2–2
2000	Hagåtña, Guam	Round 1	0–3
2001	Hagåtña, Guam	Fourth Place	3–3
2002	Philippines	Pool stage	0–4
2003	Hagåtña, Guam	Pool stage	0–4
2004	Saipan, Northern Mariana Islands	Pool stage	2–2
2005	Hagåtña, Guam	Pool stage	2–2
2006	Makati, Philippines	Pool stage	1–3
2007	Saipan, Northern Mariana Islands	Pool stage	2–2
2008	Makati, Philippines	Pool stage	0–4
2009	Makati, Philippines	Semifinals	3–2
2010	Saipan, Northern Mariana Islands	Pool stage	0–4
2011	Batangas, Philippines	Pool stage	0–4
2012	Auckland, New Zealand	Pool stage	0–4
2013	Makati, Philippines	Pool stage	1–3
2014	Saipan, Northern Mariana Islands	Pool stage	0–4
2015	Saipan, Northern Mariana Islands	Round 3	2–2
2016	Melbourne, Australia	Runner-up	3–2
2017	Makati, Philippines	Round 1	1–3
2018	Saipan, Northern Mariana Islands	Round 1	0–2
2019	Auckland, New Zealand	Round 1	0–3
2020	Cancelled due to COVID-19 pandemic		
2021	Cancelled due to COVID-19 pandemic		
2022	Guam	Round 1	0–2
2023	Auckland, New Zealand	Round 1	0–2
2024	Guam	Round 1	0–2
2025	Guam	Round 1	0–2
2026	Tanauan, Philippines	Round 2	1–2

=== Results by Country ===
As of the 2026 Senior League World Series.

Country	Region Championships	SLWS Championships	W–L	PCT
Taiwan	25	17	99–23	.811
Guam	10	0	9–26	.257
Philippines	8	0	7–25	.219
Northern Mariana Islands	6	0	6–16	.273
New Zealand	3	0	0–9	.000
Australia	1	0	3–2	.600
Totals	53	17	124–101	.551

== See also ==
Asia-Pacific Region in other Little League divisions:

- Little League — Far East (defunct)
  - Asia-Pacific & Middle East
  - Japan
- Intermediate League
- Junior League
- Big League
