= 1982 Senior League World Series =

American youth baseball tournament

Tournament information
- Location: Gary, Indiana
- Dates: August 16–21, 1982

Final positions
- Champions: Santa Barbara, California
- Runner-up: Orange Park, Florida

The 1982 Senior League World Series took place from August 16–21 in Gary, Indiana, United States. Santa Barbara, California defeated Orange Park, Florida in the championship game.

== Teams ==
United States	International
(New York (state)) Staten Island, New York East	Lethbridge. Alberta Canada
(Wisconsin) Milwaukee, Wisconsin North	(Belgium) Brussels, Belgium Europe
(Florida) Orange Park, Florida South	(Taiwan) Pingtung, Taiwan Far East
(California) Santa Barbara, California; Goleta Valley; West	(Netherlands Antilles) Aruba, Netherlands Antilles Latin America

== Results ==
Upper round 1	Upper round 2	Upper final	Championship
—	Florida	7
—	Canada	2
1–0	Florida	9
1–0	(New York (state)) New York	8
—	(New York (state)) New York	14
—	Wisconsin	3
2–0	Florida	2
2–0	California	4
—	Belgium
—	Netherlands Antilles
1–0	Netherlands Antilles	0
1–0	California	9
—	Taiwan	5
—	California	8	3–0	California	11	—
3–1	Florida	4	—
Lower round 1	Lower round 2	Lower round 3	Lower final
1–1	Netherlands Antilles	4
0–1	Canada	12	1–1	Canada (F/8)	5	2–1	Florida	2
0–1	Wisconsin	10	2–1	Canada	9	3–1	Taiwan	1
2–1	Taiwan	10
1–1	(New York (state)) New York	1
0–1	Belgium	3	1–1	Taiwan	5
0–1	Taiwan	4

1982 Senior League World Series Champions
Goleta Valley LL
Santa Barbara, California
