= 1963 Senior League World Series =

American youth baseball tournament

Tournament information
- Location: Bethlehem, Pennsylvania
- Dates: August 15–17, 1963

Final positions
- Champions: Monterrey, Mexico
- Runner-up: Downey, California

The 1963 Senior League World Series took place from August 15–17 in Bethlehem, Pennsylvania, United States. Monterrey, Mexico defeated Downey, California in the championship game. This was the only edition held in Bethlehem.

This was the first SLWS to feature an international squad.

== Teams ==
| United States | International |
|---|---|
| (New Jersey) Pompton Lakes, New Jersey East | Monterrey, Mexico Mexico |
| (Indiana) Gary, Indiana; East Glen Park; North | |
(North Carolina) Randleman, North Carolina South
(California) Downey, California West

== Results ==
Opening Round
— | Mexico | 3
— | North Carolina | 2

Semifinals
1–0 | Mexico | 2
— | Indiana | 0
— | California | 3
— | New Jersey | 2

Championship
2–0 | Mexico | 9
1–0 | California | 3
Third Place Game
0–1 | Indiana | 7
0–1 | New Jersey | 3

1963 Senior League World Series champions
Monterrey, Mexico
