= Senior League World Series (Latin America Region) =

Region for the Senior League World Series

Latin America Region
- Most recent season or competition: 2026 Senior League World Series
- Sport: Baseball
- Founded: 2017
- Most recent champions: Maracaibo, Venezuela
- Most titles: Venezuela (4)

The Senior League World Series Latin America Region is one of six International regions that currently sends teams to the World Series in Easley, South Carolina. The region's participation in the SLWS dates back to 1963.

Prior to 1974, the champions of Mexico and Puerto Rico received a berth into the SLWS. In 1974 the two regions merged to form the original Latin America Region. In 2017 the region was split in two, creating a new region of the same name, and the Caribbean Region.

== Latin America Region Countries ==
- Mexico
- Panama

== Region Champions ==
=== Mexico Region Champions ===
Year	City	SLWS	Record
1963	Monterrey	Champions	3–0
1964	Monterrey	Round 1	0–1
1965	Monterrey	Champions	2–0
1966	Monterrey	Fifth place	1–1
1967	Matamoros	Round 1	0–2
1968	Matamoros	Round 2	0–2
1969	Nuevo Laredo	Round 2	1–2
1970	Monterrey	Round 2	2–2
1971	Nuevo Laredo	Round 2	1–2
1972	Matamoros	Round 3	1–2
1973	Saltillo	Round 2	1–2

=== Puerto Rico Region Champions ===
Year	City	SLWS	Record
1970	Caguas	Round 1	0–2
1971	Mayagüez	Round 3	1–2
1972	Humacao	Round 3	1–2
1973	Río Piedras	Round 4	3–2

=== Latin America Region (1974–2016) Champions ===
Latin America Region
- Most recent season or competition: 2016 Senior League World Series
- Sport: Baseball
- Founded: 1974
- Folded: 2016
- Last champions: Carolina, Puerto Rico
- Most titles: Venezuela (12)

Year	City	SLWS	Record
1974	Guayabo, Puerto Rico	Round 1	0–2
1975	San Juan, Puerto Rico	Round 1	0–2
1976	Santo Domingo, Dominican Republic	Round 1	0–2
1977	Aruba, Netherlands Antilles	Fourth Place	2–2
1978	Aruba, Netherlands Antilles	Fourth Place	2–2
1979	Curaçao, Netherlands Antilles	Round 2	1–2
1980	Maracaibo, Venezuela	Third Place	2–2
1981	Aruba, Netherlands Antilles	Fourth Place	2–2
1982	Aruba, Netherlands Antilles	Round 2	1–2
1983	Curaçao, Netherlands Antilles	Runner-up	3–2
1984	Dominican Republic	Fourth Place	2–2
1985	Curaçao, Netherlands Antilles	Runner-up	3–2
1986	Panama City, Panama	Third Place	3–2
1987	(United States Virgin Islands) Saint Croix, U.S. Virgin Islands	Fourth Place	2–2
1988	Maracaibo, Venezuela	Runner-up	3–2
1989	Maracaibo, Venezuela	Fourth Place	2–2
1990	Maracaibo, Venezuela	Round 2	2–3
1991	Yabucoa, Puerto Rico	Round 3	2–3
1992	Santo Domingo, Dominican Republic	Runner-up	5–2
1993	La Vega, Dominican Republic	Champions	6–1
1994	Maracaibo, Venezuela	Round 3	2–3
1995	Panama City, Panama	Round 2	1–3
1996	Maracaibo, Venezuela	Champions	5–0
1997	San Francisco, Venezuela	Champions	4–1
1998	Betania, Panama	Round 3	2–3
1999	Maracaibo, Venezuela	Runner-up	3–2
2000	Panama City, Panama	Champions	6–1
2001	Maracaibo, Venezuela	Runner-up	4–2
2002	Willemstad, Curaçao	Champions	5–1
2003	Willemstad, Curaçao	Semifinals	4–1
2004	Maracaibo, Venezuela	Semifinals	3–2
2005	Santiago, Panama	Pool stage	2–2
2006	Punto Fijo, Venezuela	Champions	6–0
2007	Punto Fijo, Venezuela	Runner-up	4–2
2008	Willemstad, Curaçao	Runner-up	3–3
2009	San Nicolaas, Aruba	Semifinals	3–2
2010	San Nicolaas, Aruba (Host)	Champions	5–1
2011	San Nicolaas, Aruba	Semifinals	3–2
2012	Guatemala City, Guatemala	Champions	5–0
2013	Chitré, Panama	Champions	6–0
2014	Willemstad, Curaçao	Runner-up	5–1
2015	Willemstad, Curaçao	Round 2	2–2
2016	Carolina, Puerto Rico	Round 3	1–2

==== Results by Country ====
Country	Region Championships	SLWS Championships	W–L	PCT
Venezuela	12	3	40–21	.656
(Netherlands Antilles) Curaçao	8	1	26–14	.650
Panama	6	2	20–11	.645
(Netherlands Antilles) Aruba	6	0	13–12	.520
Dominican Republic	4	1	13–7	.650
Puerto Rico	4	0	3–9	.250
Guatemala	1	1	5–0	1.000
(Aruba) Host Team(s)	1	1	5–1	.833
(United States Virgin Islands) U.S. Virgin Islands	1	0	2–2	.500
Total	43	9	127–77	.623

=== Latin America Region (2017–Present) Champions ===
As of the 2026 Senior League World Series.

Year	City	SLWS	Record
2017	Aguadulce, Panama	Champions	4–1
2018	Barquisimeto, Venezuela	Round 3	2–2
2019	Herrera, Panama	Int'l Final	2–1
2020	Cancelled due to COVID-19 pandemic		
2021	Cancelled due to COVID-19 pandemic		
2022	Aguadulce, Panama	Int'l Final	2–2
2023	Matamoros, Mexico	Int'l Final	4–2
2024	Maracaibo, Venezuela	Champions	5–0
2025	Maracaibo, Venezuela^{[a]}		
2025	Victoria, Mexico	Round 2	1–2
2026	Maracaibo, Venezuela	Int'l Final	3–1

^{a} Cacique Mara LL from Maracaibo, Venezuela won the Latin American Regional tournament in 2025, but was denied visas for entry into the United States. The team was replaced by the Santa Maria de Aguayo LL from Victoria, Mexico, runner-up of the tournament.

==== Results by Country ====
As of the 2026 Senior League World Series.

Country	Region Championships	SLWS Championships	W–L	PCT
Venezuela	4	1	10–3	.769
Panama	3	1	8–4	.667
Mexico	1	0	5–4	.556
Total	8	2	23–11	.676

== See also ==
- Senior League World Series (Caribbean Region)

Latin America Region in other Little League divisions

- Little League – Latin America
- Little League – Caribbean
- Little League – Mexico
- Intermediate League
- Junior League
- Big League
