= 2016 Senior League World Series =

American youth baseball tournament

Tournament information
- Location: Bangor, Maine
- Dates: July 31–August 6, 2016

Final positions
- Champions: Chicago, Illinois
- Runner-up: Melbourne, Australia

The 2016 Senior League World Series took place from July 31–August 6 in Bangor, Maine, United States. Chicago, Illinois defeated Melbourne, Australia in the championship game. It was Australia's first world series final in any division of Little League.

This was the final SLWS held in Bangor.

== Teams ==
United States	International
(Maine) Hampden/Hermon, Maine; Bronco-Hermon; Host	Melbourne, Australia; Southern Mariners; Asia–Pacific
Chicago, Illinois; Clear Ridge; Central	Regina, Saskatchewan; Kiwanis National; Canada
Clifton, New Jersey; Clifton American/National; East	Barcelona, Spain; Catalunya; Europe–Africa
Dumfries, Virginia; Dumfries District; Southeast	(Puerto Rico) Carolina, Puerto Rico; Roberto Clemente; Latin America
San Antonio, Texas; Capitol Park; Southwest	
Wailuku, Hawaii; Central East Maui; West

== Results ==
Group A

—
—	Spain	0
—	Illinois	6
Lower round 1
0–1	Spain	0
0–1	Canada	1

—
1–0	Illinois	13
—	Australia	8
—	Puerto Rico	8
—	Canada	0
Lower round 2
1–1	Virginia	4
1–1	Canada	1

—
2–0	Illinois	11
1–0	Puerto Rico	1
Lower final
1–1	Hawaii	1
2–1	Virginia	9

Bracket Final
3–0	Illinois	7
3–1	Virginia	0

Group B

—
—	New Jersey	3
—	Virginia	4
Lower round 1
0–1	New Jersey	1
0–1	Texas	12

—
1–0	Virginia	4
—	Hawaii	7
—	Maine	9
—	Texas	8
Lower round 2
0–1	Australia	2
1–1	Texas	1

—
1–0	Hawaii	2
1–0	Maine	3
Lower final
1–1	Puerto Rico	7
1–1	Australia	13

Bracket Final
2–0	Maine	6
2–1	Australia	7

Consolation Round

—
1–2	Canada	0
0–2	New Jersey	4

—
0–2	Spain	3
1–2	Texas	2

Elimination Round

Semifinals
3–0	Illinois	7
3–1	Virginia	0
2–0	Maine	6
2–1	Australia	7

World Championship
4–0	Illinois	7
3–1	Australia	2

2016 Senior League World Series Champions
Clear Ridge LL
Chicago, Illinois
