= Senior League World Series =

American youth baseball tournament

- Most recent season or competition: 2026 Senior League World Series
- Sport: Baseball
- Founded: 1961
- Director: Kimber Nelson
- No. of teams: 12
- Country: International
- Most recent champion: Pearl City, Hawaii
- Most titles: Taiwan (17)
- Website: LittleLeague.org

The Senior League World Series is a baseball tournament for adolescents aged 13 to 16 years old that began in 1961. In 2017, the tournament was moved from Bangor, Maine to Easley, South Carolina. (Easley was the site of the Big League World Series from 2001 to 2016. The Big League division was discontinued after the 2016 Big League World Series.) It is patterned after the Little League World Series, which was named for the World Series in Major League Baseball since 2002.

The Senior League World Series is one of seven tournaments sponsored by Little League International. Each of them brings baseball or softball teams from around the world together in one of four age divisions. The tournament structure for each division's World Series is similar to that used for the Little League Baseball World Series.

== Tournament format ==
The six United States regions are:

- Central
- East
- Host
- Southeast
- Southwest
- West

The six International regions are:

- Asia–Pacific
- Australia
- Canada
- Caribbean
- Europe–Africa
- Latin America

The teams are placed into two six-team modified-double-elimination brackets based on geography (US and International) The semi-final winners play for the championship, televised on a network of ESPN. All semi-final and championship matches are single-elimination games.

From 2002 to 2014, a pool-play format was used. Beginning in 2015, each pool plays a modified double-elimination format until only 2 teams remain in each pool. The two remaining teams in their respective pools then play in a single-elimination, semi-final match, with the two winning teams playing in the championship. From 1967 to 2002 the tournament was straight double-elimination, from 1961 to 1966 it was single–elimination. From 1990 to 2001, a placement bracket was used to determine third place.

Before 2017, the Senior League was the only division of Little League that did not sort teams based on geography.

== Locations ==
The Senior League World Series has been held at eight different sites.

- 1961–1962 – Williamsport, Pennsylvania
- 1963 – Bethlehem, Pennsylvania
- 1964 – Louisville, Kentucky
- 1965–1967 – Des Moines, Iowa
- 1968–1985 – Gary, Indiana
- 1986–2001 – Kissimmee, Florida
- 2002–2016 – Bangor, Maine
- 2017–present – Easley, South Carolina

== Champions ==
Year	Winner	Region	Score	Runner–Up	Region
1961	Natrona Heights, Pennsylvania		8–1	Sylva, North Carolina	
1962	(New York (state)) West Hempstead, New York	East	8–2	La Habra, Southern California	West
1963	Monterrey, Mexico	Mexico	9–3	Downey, Southern California	West
1964	(New York (state)) Massapequa, New York	East	2–1	Brenham, Texas	South
1965	Monterrey, Mexico	Mexico	5–0	El Campo, Texas	South
1966	(New York (state)) East Rochester, New York	East	4–2	La Habra, Southern California	West
1967	(New York (state)) Westbury, New York	East	11–3	West Des Moines, Iowa	Host
1968	(New York (state)) New Hyde Park, New York	East	6–3	West Tampa, Florida	South
1969	Sacramento, Northern California	West	9–1	Gary, Indiana	Host
1970	West Tampa, Florida	South	2–1	(New York (state)) Throggs Neck, New York	East
1971	La Habra, Southern California	West	1–0	Richmond, Virginia	South
1972	Pingtung, Taiwan	Far East	9–0	Oxnard, Southern California	West
1973	Taipei, Taiwan	Far East	4–0	Oxon Hill, Maryland	East
1974	Pingtung, Taiwan	Far East	5–1	Charlotte, North Carolina	South
1975	Pingtung, Taiwan	Far East	5–0	Chicago, Illinois	North
1976	Pingtung, Taiwan	Far East	12–5 & 14–5	Aiea, Hawaii	West
1977	Taipei, Taiwan	Far East	5–1	Orlando, Florida	South
1978	Hualien, Taiwan	Far East	3–2	Burbank, Illinois	North
1979	Taichung, Taiwan	Far East	4–3 & 5–0	Tampa, Florida	South
1980	Pingtung, Taiwan	Far East	12–4	Kaneohe, Hawaii	West
1981	Georgetown, Delaware	East	15–4	Danville, Northern California	West
1982	Santa Barbara, Southern California	West	11–4	Orange Park, Florida	South
1983	Pingtung, Taiwan	Far East	6–4	Curaçao, Netherlands Antilles	Caribbean
1984	Altamonte Springs, Florida	South	10–7	Pingtung, Taiwan	Far East
1985	Pingtung, Taiwan	Far East	3–2	Curaçao, Netherlands Antilles	Caribbean
1986	Taipei, Taiwan	Far East	5–3	Brenham, Texas	South
1987	Athens, Ohio	North	3–2 & 12–4	Tampa, Florida	South
1988	Pingtung, Taiwan	Far East	10–4	Maracaibo, Venezuela	Latin America
1989	Pingtung, Taiwan	Far East	2–1 & 5–3	Surrey, Canada	Canada
1990	Taipei, Taiwan	Far East	8–0	Danville, Northern California	West
1991	Pingtung, Taiwan	Far East	2–1 & 8–3	Pearl City, Hawaii	West
1992	Pingtung, Taiwan	Far East	1–6 & 8–1	Santo Domingo, Dominican Republic	Latin America
1993	La Vega, Dominican Republic	Latin America	3–1 & 7–3	Taipei Taiwan	Far East
1994	Brandon, Florida	South	13–5	Midland, Michigan	North
1995	Dunedin, Florida	South	3–2	Clarksville, Indiana	North
1996	Maracaibo, Venezuela	Latin America	4–2	Thousand Oaks, Southern California	West
1997	San Francisco, Venezuela	Latin America	10–13 & 3–0	Yucaipa, Southern California	West
1998	Diamond Bar, Southern California	West	9–6	Conway, Florida	Host
1999	Conway, Florida	Host	10–2	Maracaibo, Venezuela	Latin America
2000	Panama City, Panama	Latin America	4–2 & 9–7	Pinellas Park, Florida	South
2001	Palm Harbor, Florida	South	7–4	Maracaibo, Venezuela	Latin America
2002	Willemstad, Curaçao	Caribbean	8–4	Boynton Beach, Florida	South
2003	Hilo, Hawaii	West	16–8	Chesterfield, Virginia	South
2004	Freehold Township, New Jersey	East	10–1	El Rio, Southern California	West
2005	Urbandale, Iowa	Central	7–2	Pearl City, Hawaii	West
2006	Punto Fijo, Venezuela	Latin America	4–2	Pearl City, Hawaii	West
2007	(Georgia (U.S. state)) Cartersville, Georgia	South	9–0	Punto Fijo, Venezuela	Latin America
2008	Upper Deerfield Township, New Jersey	East	10–8	Willemstad, Curaçao	Caribbean
2009	Houston, East Texas	Southwest	9–7	Fremont, Northern California	West
2010	San Nicolaas, Aruba	Caribbean	8–1	Bangor, Maine	Host
2011	Hilo, Hawaii	West	11–1	Tyler, East Texas	Southwest
2012	Guatemala City, Guatemala	Latin America	6–3	Lemon Grove, Southern California	West
2013	Chitré, Panama	Latin America	2–1	Kennett Square, Pennsylvania	East
2014	Houston, East Texas	Southwest	7–4	Willemstad, Curaçao	Caribbean
2015	Houston, East Texas	Southwest	8–1	Holmes County, Ohio	Central
2016	Chicago, Illinois	Central	7–2	Melbourne, Australia	Asia–Pacific
2017	Aguadulce, Panama	Latin America	5–4	Coral Springs, Florida	Southeast
2018	Willemstad, Curaçao	Caribbean	7–2	Wilmington, Delaware	East
2019	Wailuku, Hawaii	West	11–0^{(F/6)}	Willemstad, Curaçao	Caribbean
2020	Cancelled due to COVID-19 pandemic				
2021	Cancelled due to COVID-19 pandemic				
2022	Guayama, Puerto Rico	Caribbean	10–5	Norfolk, Virginia	Southeast
2023	Willemstad, Curaçao	Caribbean	14–1	Cherry Hill, New Jersey	East
2024	Maracaibo, Venezuela	Latin America	9–3	Irmo, South Carolina	Southeast
2025	Guaynabo, Puerto Rico	Caribbean	3–2	Easley, South Carolina	Host
2026	Pearl City, Hawaii	West	5–0	Willemstad, Curaçao	Caribbean
Year	Winner	Region	Score	Runner–Up	Region

== Championship tally ==
=== Championships won by country/state ===
Country/State	Championships	Last
Taiwan	17	1992
(New York (state)) New York	5	1968
Florida	5	2001
Venezuela	4	2024
Hawaii	4	2026
Southern California	3	1998
East Texas	3	2015
Panama	3	2017
Curaçao	3	2023
Mexico	2	1965
New Jersey	2	2008
Puerto Rico	2	2025
Pennsylvania	1	1961
Northern California	1	1969
Delaware	1	1981
Ohio	1	1987
Dominican Republic	1	1993
(Florida) Host	1	1999
Iowa	1	2005
(Georgia (U.S. state)) Georgia	1	2007
Aruba	1	2010
Guatemala	1	2012
Illinois	1	2016

== See also ==
- List of Little League World Series champions by division
- Baseball awards § Little League Baseball
