= 2012 Senior League World Series =

American youth baseball tournament

Tournament information
- Location: Bangor, Maine
- Dates: August 12–18, 2012

Final positions
- Champions: Guatemala City, Guatemala
- Runner-up: Lemon Grove, California

The 2012 Senior League World Series took place from August 12–18 in Bangor, Maine, United States. Guatemala City, Guatemala defeated Lemon Grove, California in the championship game.

== Teams ==
United States	International
(Maine) Bangor, Maine; District 3 Host	(New Zealand) Auckland, New Zealand; Bayside Westhaven; Asia–Pacific
(Michigan) Grand Rapids, Michigan; Western; Central	(Quebec) Montréal, Quebec; Notre Dame de Gracé; Canada
(Massachusetts) Auburn, Massachusetts; Auburn; East	(Italy) Emilia, Italy; Emilia; EMEA
(Florida) Brevard County, Florida; South Beaches/Greater West Melbourne; Southeast	Guatemala City, Guatemala; Juvenil de Guatemala; Latin America
(Texas) Houston, Texas; West University; Southwest	
(California) Lemon Grove, California; Lemon Grove; West

== Results ==
Group A

Team	W	L	Rs	Ra
Guatemala	3	0	28	3
Michigan	2	2	19	17
Massachusetts	2	2	22	21
Maine	1	2	14	19
Canada	1	3	6	25

	(Canada)	(Guatemala)	(Maine)	(Massachusetts)	(Michigan)
Canada	–	0–10	0–9	2–3	4–3
Guatemala	10–0	–	ppd.	12–2	6–1
Maine	9–0	ppd.	–	0–11	5–8
Massachusetts	3–2	2–12	11–0	–	6–7
Michigan	3–4	1–6	8–5	7–6	–

Group B

Team	W	L	Rs	Ra
California	4	0	33	10
Florida	3	1	23	7
Texas	2	2	30	14
Italy	1	3	11	33
New Zealand	0	4	3	36

	(California)	(Florida)	(Italy)	(New Zealand)	(Texas)
California	–	4–3	5–4^{(8)}	15–2	9–1
Florida	3–4	–	13–2	5–1	2–0
Italy	4–5^{(8)}	2–13	–	2–0	3–15
New Zealand	2–15	1–5	0–2	–	0–14
Texas	1–9	0–2	15–3	14–0	–

Elimination Round

Semifinals
3–0	Guatemala	5
3–1	Florida	2
4–0	California	6
2–2	Michigan	1

World Championship
4–0	Guatemala	6
5–0	California	3

2012 Senior League World Series Champions
Juvenil de Guatemala LL
Guatemala City, Guatemala
