= 1966 Senior League World Series =

American youth baseball tournament

Tournament information
- Location: Des Moines, Iowa
- Dates: August 18–20, 1966

Final positions
- Champions: (New York (state)) East Rochester, New York
- Runner-up: La Habra, California

The 1966 Senior League World Series took place from August 18–20 in Des Moines, Iowa, United States. East Rochester, New York defeated La Habra, California in the championship game.

== Teams ==
United States	International
(New York (state)) East Rochester, New York East	Fort William, Ontario Canada
(Ohio) Dayton, Ohio; Englewood Hills; North	Monterrey, Mexico; Del Norte; Mexico
(Maryland) Elkton, Maryland South	
(California) La Habra, California West

== Results ==
Opening Round
—	Ohio	0
—	Maryland	1
—	Mexico	0
—	(New York (state)) New York	6

Semifinals
1–0	Maryland	0
—	California	3
—	Canada	3
1–0	(New York (state)) New York	5

Championship
1–0	California	2
2–0	(New York (state)) New York	4
Third-place game
1–1	Maryland (F/5)	10
0–1	Canada	0

Fifth Place Game
0–1	Ohio	6
0–1	Mexico	7

1966 Senior League World Series Champions
East Rochester, New York
