= 1962 Senior League World Series =

American youth baseball tournament

Tournament information
- Location: Williamsport, Pennsylvania
- Dates: August 17–18, 1962

Final positions
- Champions: (New York (state)) West Hempstead, New York
- Runner-up: La Habra, California

The 1962 Senior League World Series took place from August 17–18 in Williamsport, Pennsylvania, United States at Bowman Field. West Hempstead, New York defeated La Habra, California, in the championship game. West Hempstead resident, Joseph J. Sarcona managed the team to victory. It was Long Island's first Little League World Series championship.

This was the first SLWS to feature the traditional geographical regions. It was the second, and final, edition to be held in Williamsport.

== Teams ==
United States
(New York (state)) West Hempstead, New York

East
(Ohio) New London, Ohio

North
(Florida) Fort Lauderdale, Florida

South
(California) La Habra, California

West

== Results ==
Semifinals
— | (New York (state)) New York | 3
— | Ohio | 2
— | California | 5
— | Florida | 3

Championship
1–0 | (New York (state)) New York | 8
1–0 | California | 2
Third Place Game
0–1 | Ohio (Tie F/7) | 11
0–1 | Florida | 11

1962 Senior League World Series Champions
West Hempstead, New York
