= 2026 Chinese Professional Baseball season =

2026 CPB season
- League: Chinese Professional Baseball
- Sport: Baseball
- Duration: January 1 – September 28, 2026
- Teams: 6 (4 in Spring League)
- Streaming partners: Douyin; Sina Weibo; Youku; Zhibo8

Spring League
- Season champions: Shenzhen Bluesox
- Runners-up: Shanghai Dragons
- Season MVP: Wu Qirui

Summer League
- Season champions: Shanghai Orcas
- Runners-up: Beijing Loongs
- Season MVP: Henry Urrutia

CPB seasons
- 2027 →

The 2026 Chinese Professional Baseball season was the inaugural season of Chinese Professional Baseball (CPB).

== Season schedule ==
The Spring League began on January 1, 2026, with four teams, who played 30 games at Shenzhen Zhongshan Baseball Park in Shenzhen and Zhongshan International Baseball and Softball Center in Zhongshan. Its championship series concluded on February 1, 2026.

The Summer League will be held in August and September with six teams, adding Changsha Want Want and the Shanghai Orcas. Regular season games, of which 45 are planned, began on August 13, 2026, with the top four teams advancing to the playoffs on September 21. A best-of-three championship series began on September 26.

== Spring League ==
=== Final standings ===
Rank	Team	W	L	T
1	Shenzhen Bluesox	12	6	0
2	Shanghai Dragons	11	8	0
3	Fuzhou Sea Knights	6	10	0
4	Xiamen Dolphins	5	10	0

As of February 1, 2026

=== Regular season standings ===
Rank	Team	W	L	T	Pct.	GB
1	Shenzhen Bluesox	10	5	0	.667	–
2	Shanghai Dragons	9	6	0	.600	1
3	Fuzhou Sea Knights	6	9	0	.400	4
4	Xiamen Dolphins	5	10	0	.333	5

As of February 1, 2026

=== Championship series ===
The Shenzhen Bluesox won the best-of-three championship series 2–1 against the Shanghai Dragons. Bluesox pitcher Wu Qirui was named MVP of the Spring League.

January 29, 2026; 18:30 (UTC+08:00); Wild Card	Fuzhou Sea Knights	2 – 4	Shanghai Dragons	Zhongshan Park Baseball Field, Shenzhen; Attendance: 322
January 29, 2026; 18:30 (UTC+08:00); Wild Card	LP: Zhang Yinfan	Boxscore	WP: Chen Hong-zhi; Sv: Tang Zhengjia	Zhongshan Park Baseball Field, Shenzhen; Attendance: 322

January 30, 2026; 18:30 (UTC+08:00); Finals Game 1	Shanghai Dragons	3 – 1	Shenzhen Bluesox	Zhongshan Park Baseball Field, Shenzhen; Attendance: 602
January 30, 2026; 18:30 (UTC+08:00); Finals Game 1	WP: Chen Guan-xun; Sv: Yao En-dou	Boxscore	LP: José Acuña	Zhongshan Park Baseball Field, Shenzhen; Attendance: 602

January 31, 2026; 16:30 (UTC+08:00); Finals Game 2	Shenzhen Bluesox	7 – 1	Shanghai Dragons	Zhongshan Park Baseball Field, Shenzhen; Attendance: 784
January 31, 2026; 16:30 (UTC+08:00); Finals Game 2	WP: David Reckers	Boxscore	LP: Liu Weiyu	Zhongshan Park Baseball Field, Shenzhen; Attendance: 784

February 1, 2026; 16:30 (UTC+08:00); Finals Game 3	Shanghai Dragons	3 – 4	Shenzhen Bluesox	Zhongshan Park Baseball Field, Shenzhen; Attendance: 608
February 1, 2026; 16:30 (UTC+08:00); Finals Game 3	LP: Tang Zhengjia	Boxscore	WP: Wang Peng-fei; Sv: Enrique Burgos	Zhongshan Park Baseball Field, Shenzhen; Attendance: 608

== Summer League ==
=== Regular season standings ===
Rank	Team	W	L	T	Pct.	GB
1	Xiamen Dolphins	12	3	0	.800	–
2	Beijing Loongs	9	5	1	.633	2.5
3	Shenzhen Bluesox	9	6	0	.600	3
4	Shanghai Orcas	8	7	0	.533	4
5	Fuzhou Sea Knights	4	11	0	.267	8
6	Changsha Want Want	2	12	1	.167	9.5

As of September 26, 2026

=== Group A semifinals ===
The Beijing Loongs won the best-of-three semifinal series in Group A against the Shenzhen Bluesox, two games to one.

September 21, 2026; 10:30 (UTC+08:00); Semifinals Game 1	Shenzhen Bluesox	7 – 5	Beijing Loongs	Xuhui West Bund Baseball Field, Shanghai; Attendance: 102
September 21, 2026; 10:30 (UTC+08:00); Semifinals Game 1	WP: Wang Peng-Fei; Sv: Enrique Burgos	Boxscore	LP: Carlos Teller	Xuhui West Bund Baseball Field, Shanghai; Attendance: 102

September 23, 2026; 10:30 (UTC+08:00); Semifinals Game 2	Beijing Loongs	7 – 5	Shenzhen Bluesox	Xuhui West Bund Baseball Field, Shanghai; Attendance: 98
September 23, 2026; 10:30 (UTC+08:00); Semifinals Game 2	WP: Francisco Carrillo; Sv: Yankiel Mauris	Boxscore	LP: Felix Cabrera	Xuhui West Bund Baseball Field, Shanghai; Attendance: 98

September 24, 2026; 10:30 (UTC+08:00); Semifinals Game 3	Shenzhen Bluesox	2 – 4	Beijing Loongs	Xuhui West Bund Baseball Field, Shanghai; Attendance: 107
September 24, 2026; 10:30 (UTC+08:00); Semifinals Game 3	LP: David Reckers	Boxscore	WP: Luis Romero; Sv: Yankiel Mauris	Xuhui West Bund Baseball Field, Shanghai; Attendance: 107

=== Group B semifinals ===
The Shanghai Orcas won the best-of-three semifinal series in Group B against the Xiamen Dolphins, two games to one.

September 22, 2026; 17:30 (UTC+08:00); Semifinals Game 1	Shanghai Orcas	1 – 3	Xiamen Dolphins	Xuhui West Bund Baseball Field, Shanghai; Attendance: 185
September 22, 2026; 17:30 (UTC+08:00); Semifinals Game 1	LP: Rintaro Hirama	Boxscore	WP: Isaki Ninomiya; Sv: Henry Henry	Xuhui West Bund Baseball Field, Shanghai; Attendance: 185

September 23, 2026; 17:30 (UTC+08:00); Semifinals Game 2	Xiamen Dolphins	4 – 5	Shanghai Orcas	Xuhui West Bund Baseball Field, Shanghai; Attendance: 289
September 23, 2026; 17:30 (UTC+08:00); Semifinals Game 2	LP: Pavel Hernandez	Boxscore	WP: Jesús Vargas; Sv: Edgar Isea	Xuhui West Bund Baseball Field, Shanghai; Attendance: 289

September 24, 2026; 17:30 (UTC+08:00); Semifinals Game 3	Shanghai Orcas	4 – 1	Xiamen Dolphins	Xuhui West Bund Baseball Field, Shanghai; Attendance: 315
September 24, 2026; 17:30 (UTC+08:00); Semifinals Game 3	WP: Euijun Kim; Sv: Emerson Martinez	Boxscore	LP: Henry Henry	Xuhui West Bund Baseball Field, Shanghai; Attendance: 315

=== Championship series ===
The Shanghai Orcas won the best-of-three championship series against the Beijing Loongs, two games to one. Orcas infielder Henry Urrutia was named MVP of the Summer League, with a batting average of .410 and an on-base percentage of .452.

September 26, 2026; 16:30 (UTC+08:00); Finals Game 1	Shanghai Orcas	11 – 1	Beijing Loongs	Xuhui West Bund Baseball Field, Shanghai; Attendance: 1,253
September 26, 2026; 16:30 (UTC+08:00); Finals Game 1	WP: Rintaro Hirama	Boxscore	LP: Francisco Carrillo	Xuhui West Bund Baseball Field, Shanghai; Attendance: 1,253

September 27, 2026; 16:30 (UTC+08:00); Finals Game 2	Beijing Loongs	14 – 0	Shanghai Orcas	Xuhui West Bund Baseball Field, Shanghai; Attendance: 1,357
September 27, 2026; 16:30 (UTC+08:00); Finals Game 2	WP: Robert Colina	Boxscore	LP: Angel Macuare	Xuhui West Bund Baseball Field, Shanghai; Attendance: 1,357

September 28, 2026; 18:00 (UTC+08:00); Finals Game 3	Shanghai Orcas	1 – 0	Beijing Loongs	Xuhui West Bund Baseball Field, Shanghai; Attendance: 586
September 28, 2026; 18:00 (UTC+08:00); Finals Game 3	WP: Jesús Vargas; Sv: Emerson Martinez	Boxscore	LP: Luis Romero	Xuhui West Bund Baseball Field, Shanghai; Attendance: 586

== See also ==
- 2026 in baseball
