= 2026 in baseball =

The following are the baseball events of the year 2026 throughout the world.

== International competition ==
=== National Team tournaments ===
- U-15 Baseball World Cup (September 25 – October 4): United States
- U-23 Baseball World Cup (November 6–15): Venezuela
- WBSC Premier12 Barcelona Qualifier (October 9–11): Italy & Spain
- WBSC Premier12 Zhongshan Qualifier (November 26–29)
- Women's Baseball World Cup - Group Stage (Rockford) (July 22–27): United States
- Women's Baseball World Cup - Group Stage (Tainan) (August 23–27): Japan
- World Baseball Classic (March 5–17): Venezuela
- World Collegiate Baseball Championship (July 12–15): Japan

==== Americas ====
- Central American and Caribbean Games (July 31 – August 7): Panama
- Central American Baseball Cup (June 11–14): Guatemala
- South American Youth Games (April 12–25): Panama
- U-12 Pan American Baseball Championship (November 20–27)
- U-18 Pan American Baseball Championship (October 22–29): United States

==== Asia ====
- Asia Professional Baseball Championship (November 11–15): Japan
- Asian Games (September 19 – October 4):South Korea
- East Asia Baseball Cup (December 7–13):
- U-12 Asian Baseball Championship (August 10–15): Japan
- U-18 Asian Baseball Championship (September 7–13): South Korea

==== Europe ====
- U-12 Baseball European Championship (July 7–11): Germany
- U-18 Baseball European Championship (July 13–19): Italy
- Haarlem Baseball Week (June 26 – July 4): Italy
- Prague Baseball Week (July 5–8): Netherlands

==== Baseball5 ====
- Baseball5 World Cup (December 9–13)
- Baseball5 Asia Cup (March 27–31): Chinese Taipei
- Baseball5 Pan American Championship (October 14–17): Venezuela
- Mediterranean Games (July 29 – August 1): Turkey
- Youth Olympic Games (October 31 – November 3): Cuba
- Youth Baseball5 European Championship (November 11–14): Turkey
- Youth Baseball5 Pan American Championship (October 14–17): Cuba

=== Club team tournaments ===
- Asia Winter Baseball League (November 14–December 4):
- Baseball Champions League Americas (March 24–29): Kane County Cougars
- Baseball Champions League Europe (May 22–24, September 26–27): Parma Baseball Club
- Caribbean Series: (February 1–7): Charros de Jalisco
- Grand Forks International (June 21–28): Seattle Studs
- Serie de las Américas (February 5–13): Navegantes del Magallanes

=== Little League ===
- Little League World Series: Pariba Little League (Willemstad, Curaçao)
- Intermediate League World Series: West Seoul Little League (Seoul, South Korea)
- Junior League World Series: La Mirada Little League (La Mirada, California)
- Senior League World Series: Pearl City Little League (Pearl City, Hawaii)

== North American domestic leagues ==
=== Major League Baseball ===
Wild Card Series (ALWCS, NLWCS)
4	NY Yankees	2
5	Boston	0
3	Houston	0
6	Chicago White Sox	2
4	San Diego	2
5	Chicago Cubs	0
3	Atlanta	2
6	Philadelphia	1

Division Series (ALDS, NLDS)
1	Tampa Bay	3
4	NY Yankees	0
American League
2	Cleveland	3
6	Chicago White Sox	2
1	Milwaukee	3
4	San Diego	1
National League
2	LA Dodgers	3
3	Atlanta	1

Championship Series (ALCS, NLCS)
1	Tampa Bay	4
2	Cleveland	2
1	Milwaukee	4
2	LA Dodgers	0

World Series
AL1	Tampa Bay	1
NL1	Milwaukee	4

=== Minor League Baseball ===
- Triple–A
  - International League: Rochester Red Wings (Washington Nationals)
  - Pacific Coast League: Oklahoma City Comets (Los Angeles Dodgers)
    - Triple-A National Championship Game: Oklahoma City Comets (Los Angeles Dodgers)
- Double–A
  - Eastern League: Reading Fightin Phils (Philadelphia Phillies)
  - Southern League: Rocket City Trash Pandas (Los Angeles Angels)
  - Texas League: Amarillo Sod Poodles (Arizona Diamondbacks)
- High–A
  - Midwest League: Quad Cities River Bandits (Kansas City Royals)
  - Northwest League: Vancouver Canadians (Toronto Blue Jays)
  - South Atlantic League: Winston-Salem Dash (Chicago White Sox)
- Single–A
  - California League: Lake Elsinore Storm (San Diego Padres)
  - Carolina League: Fayetteville Woodpeckers (Houston Astros)
  - Florida State League: Jupiter Hammerheads (Miami Marlins)
- Rookie
  - Arizona Complex League: ACL Rockies (Colorado Rockies)
  - Dominican Summer League: DSL Padres Gold (San Diego Padres)
  - Florida Complex League: FCL Astros (Houston Astros)
- Fall League
  - Arizona Fall League: Peoria Javelinas

=== Independent baseball leagues ===
- MLB Partner Leagues
  - American Association of Professional Baseball: Kansas City Monarchs
  - Atlantic League of Professional Baseball: Long Island Ducks
  - Frontier League: Ottawa Titans
  - Pioneer League: Billings Mustangs
- Non-partner leagues
  - Banana Ball Championship League: Texas Tailgaters
  - Canadian Baseball League: Welland Jackfish
  - Empire Professional Baseball League: Malone Border Hounds
  - Pecos League: Garden City Wind
  - United Shore Professional Baseball League: Utica Unicorns
  - Women's Pro Baseball League: Los Angeles Queens

=== College Baseball ===
- NCAA
  - 2026 College World Series (Division I): Oklahoma
  - Division II: Tampa
  - Division III: Denison
- NAIA: Tennessee Wesleyan
- USCAA: The Apprentice School
- Ontario: Brock
- NCCAA: Southwestern Christian
- Junior College World Series:
  - NJCAA Division I: Johnson County
  - NJCAA Division II: Pearl River
  - NJCAA Division III: SUNY Niagara
  - California: Santa Ana
  - Northwest: Lower Columbia
  - Quebec: Limoilou

=== Colliegiate Summer Baseball Leagues ===
- Appalachian League: Kingsport Axmen
- Cape Cod League: Harwich Mariners
- MLB Draft League: Williamsport Crosscutters
- New England Collegiate Baseball League: Sanford Mainers

== Other domestic leagues ==
=== Summer leagues ===
==== Americas ====
- Cuban Elite League: Industriales
- Mexican Baseball League: Toros de Tijuana

==== Asia ====
- China Baseball League: Shanghai Huaxin
- Chinese Professional Baseball (Spring): Shenzhen Bluesox
- Chinese Professional Baseball (Summer): Shanghai Orcas
- Korean League—Korean Series: Samsung Lions
- Nippon Professional Baseball—Japan Series: Fukuoka SoftBank Hawks
  - Central League: Hanshin Tigers
  - Pacific League: Fukuoka SoftBank Hawks
- Taiwan League—Taiwan Series: Wei Chuan Dragons

==== Europe ====
- Austrian League: Wiener Neustadt Diving Ducks
- Belgian League: Hoboken Pioneers
- British League: London Mets
- Croatian League: Nada Split
- Czech Baseball Extraliga: Hroši Brno
- Dutch League—Holland Series: Neptunus
- Finnish League: Helsinki Puumat
- French League: Lions de Savigny-sur-Orge
- German League: Bonn Capitals
- Italian Baseball League: Parma Baseball Club
- Irish League: Mariners Baseball
- Slovak League: Apollo Bratislava
- Spanish League: Tenerife Marlins
- Swedish League: Rättvik Butchers
- Swiss League: Therwil Flyers

=== Winter leagues ===
- Australian Baseball League: Adelaide Giants
- Colombian League: Caimanes de Barranquilla
- Cuban National Series: Cocodrilos de Matanzas
- Dominican League: Leones del Escogido
- Mexican Pacific League: Charros de Jalisco
- Nicaraguan League: Leones de León
- Puerto Rican League: Cangrejeros de Santurce
- Venezuelan League: Navegantes del Magallanes

== Events ==
=== January ===
- January 20: The results of the Baseball Writers' Association of America's voting for the 2026 Hall of Fame induction class were announced. Carlos Beltrán and Andruw Jones were the candidates elected.

=== February ===
- February 13: KBO Spring Training begins
- February 18: Pitchers and catchers report
- February 19: Other Players report

=== March ===
- March 7: KBO Spring Training ends
- March 12-24: 2026 KBO preseason
- March 25: Opening Day, 2026 Major League Baseball (one game, New York (AL) at San Francisco)
- March 26: Opening Day for the other 28 MLB teams
- March 28: 2026 KBO League Opening Day

=== April ===
- April 15: Jackie Robinson Day

=== June ===
- June 12–21: The 2026 Men's College World Series was held at Charles Schawb Field in Omaha, Nebraska

=== July ===
- July 12–13: 2026 Major League Baseball draft
- July 14: The 96th Major League Baseball All-Star Game was played at Citizens Bank Park in Philadelphia.

=== August ===
- August 20–30: 2026 Little League World Series in South Williamsport, Pennsylvania
- August 23: MLB Little League Classic at Historic Bowman Field in Williamsport, Pennsylvania: Atlanta Braves 4, Milwaukee Brewers 2

=== September ===
- September 27: Last day of MLB regular season
- September 29: The American League Wild Card Series and National League Wild Card Series begin.

=== October ===
- October 2: The American League Division Series and National League Division Series begin.
- October 11: The American League Championship Series begins
- October 12: The National League Championship Series begins
- October 23: The 2026 World Series begins.

=== November ===
- November 1: Eligible MLB players become free agents

=== December ===
- December 6–9: Winter Meetings in TBD
- December 9: Rule 5 draft

== Deaths ==
=== January ===
- January 1 – Jeon Jun-ho, 50, KBO League pitcher from 1995 to 2009 for the Unicorns, Heroes, and Landers.
- January 2 – Jim Willis, 98, pitcher from 1953 to 1954 for the Cubs.
- January 6 – Jerry Thomas, 89, pitcher from 1954 to 1956 for the University of Minnesota.
- January 7 – Sidney de Jong, 46, catcher from 1998 to 2011 and later a coach and manager for the Netherlands national baseball team.
- January 11
  - Pavel Akishev, 42, pitcher from 2003 to 2007 for the Russia national baseball team.
  - Dave Giusti, 86, pitcher from 1962 to 1977 for the Colt .45s / Astros, Cardinals, Pirates, Athletics, and Cubs.
  - Stu Tate, 63, pitcher for the 1989 Giants.
- January 14 – Kim Min-jae, 53, Korea Baseball Organization shortstop from 1991 to 2009 for the Giants, Wyverns, and Eagles, and coach for multiple teams from 2009 to 2025.
- January 15 – Ray Crone, 94, pitcher from 1954 to 1958 for the Braves and Giants.
- January 17 – Wilbur Wood, 84, pitcher from 1961 to 1978 for the Red Sox, Pirates, and White Sox.
- January 19 –
  - Dave Schmidt, 69, catcher for the 1981 Red Sox.
  - Zach Monroe, 94, pitcher for the 1958–59 Yankees.
- January 21 – Rob Maurer, 59, first baseman for the 1991–92 Rangers.
- January 31 – Rick Renick, infielder and outfielder for the 1968–72 Twins and coach for multiple teams from 1981 to 2002.

=== February ===
- February 3 – Ron Teasley, 99 outfielder for the 1948 New York Cubans of the Negro Leagues.
- February 4 – Mickey Lolich, 85, pitcher from 1963 to 1979 for the Tigers, Mets, and Padres.
- February 6 - Terrance Gore, 34, outfielder from 2014 to 2022 for the Royals, Cubs, Dodgers, Braves, and Mets.
- February 7 – Gary Blaylock, 94, pitcher for the Cardinals and Yankees in 1959 and later coach for the Royals from 1984 to 1987.
- February 9 – Bobby Henrich, 87, shortstop for the 1957–59 Reds.
- February 12 –
  - Roy Face, 97, pitcher from 1953 to 1969 for the Pirates, Tigers and Expos.
  - Joe Nossek, Outfielder from 1964 to 1970 for the Twins, Athletics and Cardinals.
- February 20 – Bill Mazeroski, 89, second baseman from 1956 to 1972 for the Pirates.
- February 25 – Wayne Granger, 81, pitcher from 1968 to 1976 for the Cardinals, Reds, Twins, Yankees, White Sox, Astros and Expos.

=== March ===
- March 11 – Gary Wagner, 85, pitcher from 1965 to 1970 for the Phillies and Red Sox.
- March 12 – Tony Balsamo, 89, pitcher for the 1962 Cubs.
- March 17 – Larry Stahl, 84, outfielder from 1964 to 1973 for the Athletics, Mets, Padres and Reds.
- March 26 – Ken Clay, 71, pitcher from 1977 to 1981 for the Yankees, Rangers and Mariners.
- March 27 – Tom Nieto, 65, catcher from 1984 to 1990 for the Cardinals, Expos, Twins and Phillies and later a coach for the Yankees and Mets from 1995 to 2008.

=== April ===
- April 4 – Bob Duliba, 91, pitcher from 1959 to 1967 for the Cardinals, Angels, Red Sox and Athletics.
- April 7 – Chuck Nieson, 83, pitcher for the 1964 Twins.
- April 8 – Davey Lopes, 80, second baseman from 1972 to 1987 for the Dodgers, Athletics, Cubs and Astros, manager for the 2000–02 Brewers and coach for multiple teams between 1988 and 2017.
- April 9 –
  - Billy Bryan, 87, catcher from 1961 to 1968 for the Athletics, Yankees and Senators.
  - John Edelman, 90, pitcher for the 1955 Braves.
- April 11 – Phil Garner, 76, second baseman from 1973 to 1988 for the Athletics, Pirates, Astros, Dodgers and Giants and Manager from 1992 to 2007 for the Brewers, Tigers and Astros.
- April 16 – Garret Anderson, 53, outfielder from 1994 to 2010 for the Angels, Braves and Dodgers.
- April 22 – Corky Withrow, 88, outfielder for the 1963 Cardinals.
- April 23 – Ellie Rodríguez, 79, catcher from 1968 to 1976 for the Yankees, Royals, Brewers, Angels and Dodgers and manager in the Mexican Baseball League from 1978 to 1982.
- April 28 – Conrad Cardinal, 84, pitcher for the 1963 Colt .45s.

=== May ===
- May 4 –
  - Bob Skinner, 94, outfielder and first baseman from 1954 to 1966 for the Pirates, Reds and Cardinals, manager from 1968 to 1969 for the Phillies and 1977 for the Padres and coach for multiple teams between 1970 and 1988.
  - John Sterling, 87, broadcaster from 1989 to 2024 for the Yankees.
- May 6 –
  - Dick Hughes, 88, pitcher from 1966 to 1968 for the Cardinals..
  - Ted Turner, 87, owner of the Atlanta Braves from 1976 to 1996.
- May 7 – Rick Kreuger, 77, pitcher from 1975 to 1977 for the Red Sox, Indians and Yomiuri Giants.
- May 9 – Bobby Cox, 84, third baseman from 1968 to 1969 for the Yankees and Manager from 1978 to 2010 for the Blue Jays and Braves.
- May 11 – Buzz Capra, 78, pitcher from 1971 to 1977 for the Mets and Braves.
- May 20 – Mike Johnson, 75, pitcher for the 1974 Padres.
- May 23 – Charlie Moore, 72, catcher and outfielder from 1973 to 1987 for the Brewers and Blue Jays.
- May 26 –
  - Bob Horner, 68, third baseman and first baseman from 1978 to 1988 for the Braves, Swallows and Cardinals.
  - Mark Bailey, 64, catcher from 1984 to 1992 for the Astros and Giants.

=== June ===
- June 4 –
  - Bob Lacey, 72, pitcher from 1977 to 1984 for the Athletics, Indians, Rangers, Angels and Giants.
  - Eddie Haas, 91, outfielder from 1957 to 1960 for the Cubs and Braves and manager for the 1985 Braves.
- June 10 – Wes Gardner, 65, pitcher from 1984 to 1991 for the Mets, Red Sox, Padres and Royals.
- June 12 – Alan Closter, 82, pitcher for the Senators, Yankees and Braves.
- June 16 – Al Worthington, 97, pitcher from 1953 to 1969 for the Giants, Red Sox, White Sox, Reds and Twins. He later became the first baseball coach at Liberty University.

=== July ===
- July 4 – Al Holland, 73, pitcher from 1977–87 for the Pirates, Giants, Phillies, Angels and Yankees.
- July 5 – Darrell Jackson, 70, pitcher from 1978–82 for the Twins.
- July 8 – Phil Regan, 89, pitcher from 1960–72 for the Tigers, Dodgers, Cubs and White Sox, manager of the 1995 Orioles, and pitching instructor for several teams.
- July 11 – Héctor Valle, 85, catcher for the 1965 Dodgers.
- July 15 – Ron Hunt, 85, second baseman from 1963–74 for the Mets, Dodgers, Giants, Expos and Cardinals.
- July 18 – Duane Ward, 62, pitcher from 1986–95 for the Braves and Blue Jays.
- July 21 – Scott Brown, 69, pitcher for the 1981 Reds.
- July 23 – Ossie Blanco, 80, first baseman from 1970–74 for the White Sox and Indians.

=== August ===
- August 14 – Butch Huskey, 54, outfielder from 1993–2000 for the Mets, Mariners, Red Sox, Twins and Rockies.
- August 15 – Tommy John, 83, pitcher from 1963–89 for the Indians, White Sox, Dodgers, Yankees, Angels and Athletics.
- August 25 – Pat Putnam, 72, first baseman from 1977–87 for the Rangers, Mariners, Twins, and Ham Fighters.
- August 27 – Rich Rowland, 62, catcher from 1990–95 for the Tigers and Red Sox..
- August 28 –
  - Larry Christenson, 72, pitcher from 1973–83 for the Phillies.
  - Jim Rittwage, 81, pitcher for the 1970 Indians.
- August 31 – Rollie Sheldon, 89, pitcher from 1961–66 for the Yankees, Athletics and Red Sox.

=== September ===
- September 5 – Joe Morgan, 95, infielder and outfielder from 1959–64 for the Braves, Athletics, Phillies, Indians and Cardinals and Manager from 1988–91 for the Red Sox.
- September 9 – Isao Harimoto, 86, Nippon Professional Baseball outfielder from 1959–1981 for the Flyers / Fighters, Giants, Orions.
- September 15 – Brian Wolfe, 45, pitcher from 2007–18 for the Blue Jays in MLB and the Ham Fighters, Hawks and Lions in NPB.
- September 22 – Don Cooper, 70, pitcher from 1981–85 for the Twins, Blue Jays and Yankees and coach for the White Sox from 2002–20.
- September 25 – Jeoff Long, 84, outfielder and first baseman from 1963–64 for the Cardinals and White Sox.
- September 30 – Dave Rosello, 76, infielder from 1972–81 for the Cubs and Indians.

=== October ===
- October 5 –
  - Fred Claire, 91, General Manager for the Los Angeles Dodgers from 1987–98.
  - Sam McDowell, 84, pitcher from 1961–75 for the Indians, Giants, Yankees and Pirates.
- October 10 – Bud Zipfel, 87, first baseman from 1961–62 for the Senators.
- October 21 – Todd Benzinger, 63, first baseman and outfielder from 1987–95 for the Red Sox, Reds, Royals, Dodgers and Giants.
- October 23 – George Thomas, 88, outfielder form 1957–71 for the Tigers, Angels, Red Sox and Twins.

=== November ===
- November 1 – Jerry Koosman, 83, pitcher from 1967–85 for the Mets, Twins, White Sox and Phillies.
- November 9 – Bob Boone, 78, catcher from 1972–90 for the Phillies, Angels and Royals and manager from 1995-2003 for the Royals and Reds.
- November 15 – Ken Sanders, 85, pitcher from 1964–76 for the Athletics, Red Sox, Brewers, Twins, Indians, Angels, Mets and Royals.
- November 17 –
  - Lance Broadway, 43, pitcher from 2007–09 for the White Sox and Mets.
  - Yutaka Enatsu, 78, Nippon Professional Baseball pitcher from 1967–84 for the Tigers, Hawks, Carp, Fighters and Lions.
- November 19 – Stan Cliburn, 69, catcher for the 1980 Angels and long time minor league baseball manager.

== See also ==
- 2026 KBO League season
- 2026 Nippon Professional Baseball season
- 2026 Major League Baseball season
