= Keone Kela =

American baseball player (born 1993)

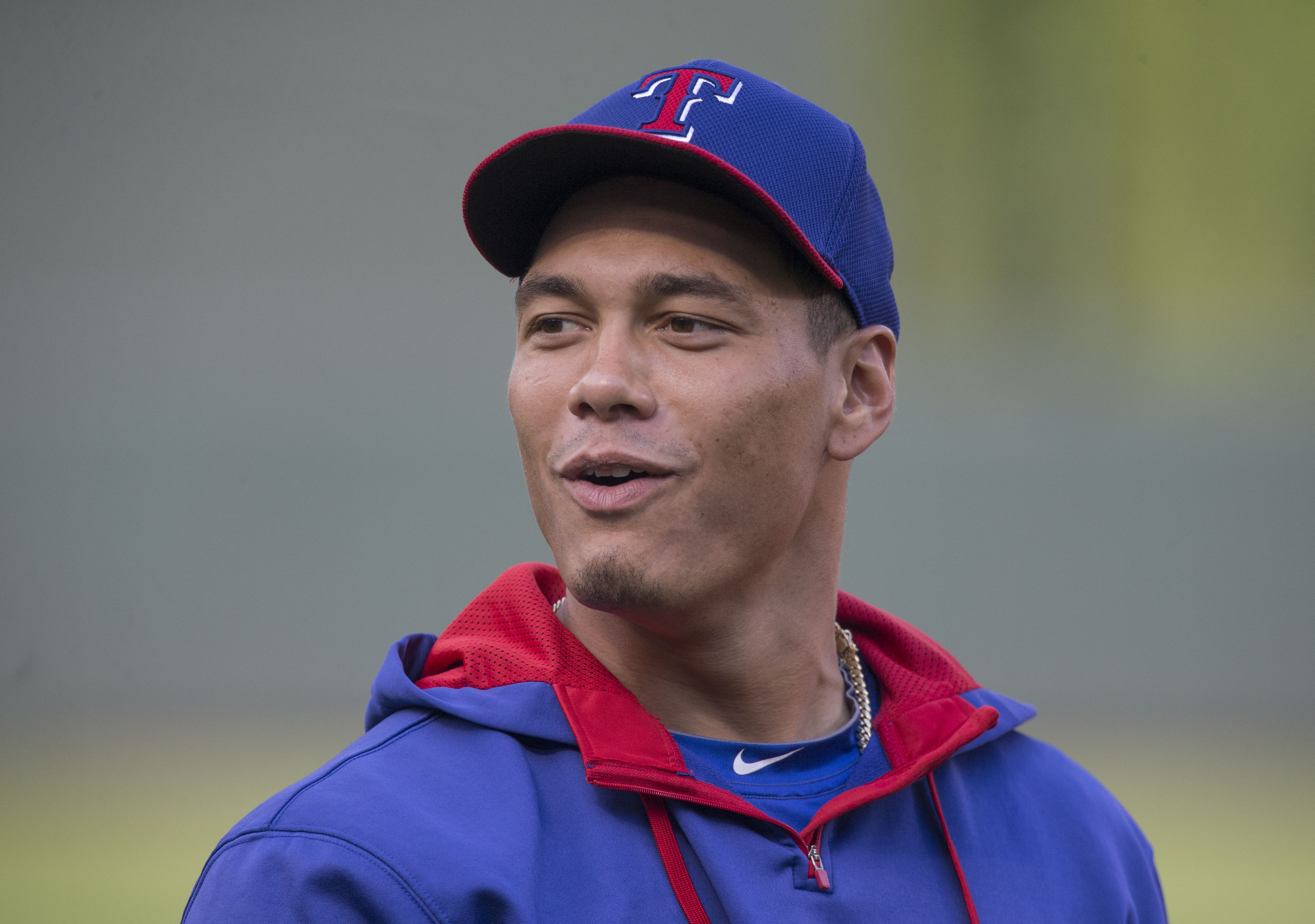
- Kela with the Texas Rangers in 2015

Shenzhen Bluesox – No. 50
- Pitcher
- Born: April 16, 1993 (age 33); Los Angeles, California, U.S.
- Bats: Right Throws: Right

MLB debut
- April 7, 2015, for the Texas Rangers

MLB statistics (through 2021 season)
- Win–loss record: 23–13
- Earned run average: 3.33
- Strikeouts: 279
- Stats at Baseball Reference

Teams
- Texas Rangers (2015–2018); Pittsburgh Pirates (2018–2020); San Diego Padres (2021)

Keone Cole Kela (born April 16, 1993) is an American professional baseball pitcher for the Shenzhen Bluesox of Chinese Professional Baseball. He has previously played in Major League Baseball (MLB) for the Texas Rangers, Pittsburgh Pirates, and San Diego Padres.

== Early life ==
Kela attended Carson Senior High School in Carson, California and graduated from Chief Sealth High School in Seattle, Washington. He was chosen by the Seattle Mariners in the 29th round of the 2011 MLB draft, but did not sign and enrolled at Everett Community College, where he played college baseball as a center fielder for one season.

== Career ==
=== Texas Rangers ===
The Texas Rangers selected Kela as a pitcher in the 12th round, with the 396th overall selection, of the 2012 MLB draft. Kela signed with the Rangers following the draft.

In 2013, Kela reached the Single-A South Atlantic League. He started the 2014 season in High-A, and was promoted to the Frisco RoughRiders of the Double-A Texas League. The Rangers invited Kela to spring training in 2015. Kela made the Rangers' Opening Day roster. He collected his first career win against the Oakland Athletics on May 2, 2015. Kela finished his 2015 season with a 2.39 earned run average (ERA). He had elbow surgery and missed three months of the 2016 season. He pitched to a 5–1 record with a 6.09 ERA in 35 games in 2016.

After he showed an unprofessional lack of effort in a minor league intrasquad game, the Rangers optioned Kela to the Round Rock Express of the Triple-A Pacific Coast League for the start of the 2017 season. He made 39 appearances for the Rangers in 2017, missing time with a stiff right shoulder. After the 2017 season, Kela underwent stem-cell therapy to treat his right shoulder. Kela became the Rangers closer in 2018.

=== Pittsburgh Pirates ===
On July 31, 2018, the Rangers traded Kela to the Pittsburgh Pirates for Taylor Hearn and Sherten Apostel.

In an April 7, 2019 game against the Cincinnati Reds, Kela was ejected after his role in a bench clearing incident involving Chris Archer, Derek Dietrich, Yasiel Puig, Amir Garrett, David Bell, and Felipe Vázquez. On July 30, 2019, Kela was involved in a second bench-clearing fracas against the Reds and was suspended for 2 games on August 1. Kela made 32 appearances for the Pirates in 2019, pitching to a 2.12 ERA with 33 strikeouts in 29 2/3 innings. In 2020, Kela only made 3 appearances for the team, giving up 1 run in 2.0 innings with 3 strikeouts.

=== San Diego Padres ===
On February 18, 2021, Kela signed a one-year, $1.2 million contract with the San Diego Padres. On May 19, Kela underwent Tommy John surgery, ending his 2021 season. In 12 games for San Diego, Kela pitched to a 2–2 record and 5.06 ERA with 13 strikeouts. On May 23, Kela was placed on the 60-day injured list as he recovered from the surgery.

=== Arizona Diamondbacks ===
On March 16, 2022, Kela signed a minor league contract with the Arizona Diamondbacks. He spent the year with the Triple-A Reno Aces, also making three scoreless appearances for the rookie-level Arizona Complex League Diamondbacks. In nine games for Reno, Kela logged an 0-1 record and 5.00 ERA with 11 strikeouts and one save over nine innings of work. He was released by the Diamondbacks organization on August 31.

=== Los Angeles Dodgers ===
On September 1, 2022, Kela signed a minor league deal with the Los Angeles Dodgers. He pitched 6 2/3 innings over seven games for the Triple-A Oklahoma City Dodgers, allowing six earned runs for a 6.75 ERA. He elected free agency following the season on November 10.

=== Tokyo Yakult Swallows ===
On December 21, 2022, Kela signed with the Tokyo Yakult Swallows of Nippon Professional Baseball (NPB). He made 15 appearances for their farm team but struggled to a 7.71 ERA with 16 strikeouts and 3 saves in 14 innings pitched. Kela did not appear for the Swallows in 2023, and was released by the club in October 2023.

=== Tecolotes de los Dos Laredos ===
On February 6, 2024, Kela signed with the Tecolotes de los Dos Laredos of the Mexican League. In 42 relief outings for Dos Laredos, he compiled a 2.70 ERA with 40 strikeouts across 40 innings pitched. In late July, Kela was suspended for the remainder of the season, with the Mexican League fining him for his conduct during a game against Dorados de Chihuahua.

On April 14, 2025, Kela re-signed with the Tecolotes.

=== Chicago White Sox ===
On April 16, 2025, Kela signed a minor league contract with the Chicago White Sox. In 16 appearances split between the Double-A Birmingham Barons and Triple-A Charlotte Knights, he struggled to a 1–2 record and 7.11 ERA with 27 strikeouts and one save over 19 innings of work. Kela was released by the White Sox organization on June 15.

=== Tecolotes de los Dos Laredos (second stint) ===
On June 20, 2025, Kela signed with the Tecolotes de los Dos Laredos of the Mexican League. In 14 games of relief, he posted a 1-1 record with a 2.70 ERA and 18 strikeouts over 13 1/3 innings pitched.

=== Olmecas de Tabasco ===
On February 3, 2026, Kela was traded to the Olmecas de Tabasco of the Mexican League. In 29 games he threw 30.1 innings of relief going 2-2 with a 2.37 ERA and 30 strikeouts.

=== Shenzhen Bluesox ===
On August 10, 2026, Kela signed with the Shenzhen Bluesox of Chinese Professional Baseball.

== Personal ==
When Kela was born, his mother was 16 years old, and his father was 15 years old. Though Kela was born in Los Angeles, much of his father's family is from Hawaii. His grandparents are from Keaukaha on the Big Island, where Kela spent each summer, enjoying Puhi Bay and Hilo.
