= Shanghai Orcas =

Professional baseball team based in Shanghai, China

- 上海虎鲸

Information
- League: Chinese Professional Baseball
- Location: Shanghai
- Ballpark: Xuhui West Bund Baseball Field
- Established: July 6, 2026; 4 months ago
- Colors: Navy blue, red, white
- General manager: Zhang Xiaotian
- Manager: Kim Yong-dal

The Shanghai Orcas (Chinese: 上海虎鲸; pinyin: Shànghǎi Hǔjīng) are a professional baseball team based in Shanghai, China. The team was established in 2026 as a franchise of Chinese Professional Baseball (CPB), replacing the Shanghai Dragons (now the Beijing Loongs).

== History ==
=== Founding and inaugural season (2026) ===
In July 2026, Chinese Professional Baseball (CPB) underwent franchise realignment when the original Shanghai Dragons relocated to Beijing and rebranded as the Beijing Loongs. The Shanghai Orcas were officially established on July 6, 2026, as a replacement franchise.

Meanwhile, the Shanghai Orcas traded the draft rights of the first three rounds in the Super Round with Beijing Loongs, acquiring the signing rights of 14 players who had played for the Shanghai Dragons in the 2026 CPB Spring Game, enabling them to retain part of their roster.

The club appointed Zhang Xiaotian as general manager and brought in veteran South Korean coach Kim Yong-dal as the inaugural field manager. Building a competitive roster on short notice, the Orcas combined domestic talent from across the country with international signings from Japan, South Korea and Latin America.

In their first season—the 2026 CPB Summer Game—the club suffered four consecutive losses, followed by five straight wins. The club finished the regular season in fourth place. In the first round of the postseason, the club defeated the Xiamen Dolphins, who had finished first in the regular season, by a series score of 2–1; in their three previous regular-season meetings, they had not recorded a single win against Xiamen. In the subsequent championship series, the club faced Beijing Loongs, who had finished second in the regular season—against whom they had also failed to win in three regular-season meetings. In the end, the club edged out a 1–0 win in Game 3 of the series and won the 2026 CPB Summer Game championship.

== Ballpark ==
=== Xuhui West Bund Baseball Field ===
Although CPB implemented a centralized tournament format for the 2026 Summer Game, Xuhui West Bund Baseball Field serves as the de facto home field for the Shanghai Orcas. The facility is located near the intersection of Longteng Avenue and Huaji Road in Xuhui, Shanghai.

Jointly developed by the club and Shanghai West Bund Group, the field spans over 35,000 square meters—including a 13,000-square-meter playing field and 3,180-square-meter bleachers with a seating capacity of 1,500.

The field opened on August 13, 2026 to host CPB competitions. However, due to localized heavy rainfall brought by the remnants of Typhoon Dolphin, both games originally scheduled for August 13 and 14 were postponed, and the first game was not officially held at the field until August 15.

== Roster ==
Shanghai Orcas roster
Active roster		Coaches
Pitchers: 5 (Venezuela) Emerson Martinez; 11 (China) Li Jianye; 12 (South Korea) Lee Jaemin; 17 (Dominican Republic) Franklyn Kilomé; 18 (Venezuela) Angel Macuare; 19 (South Korea) Kim Euijun; 20 (Chinese Taipei) Chen Hong-Zhi; 21 (Venezuela) Edgar Isea; 26 (China) Tu Jialun; 28 (China) Lin Yujun; 38 (Japan) Hirama Rintaro; 55 (South Korea) Jang Wonho; 60 (Chinese Taipei) Chen Guan-Xun; 69 (Japan) Sakurai Shuto; 87 (Venezuela) Enderson Franco; 92 (Venezuela) Jesús Vargas	Catchers: 27 (Chinese Taipei) Huang Nien-Yu; 62 (South Korea) Ji San; 65 (China) Mai Zhengwen; 68 (Venezuela) Wilmer Perez; Infielders: 7 (China) Yang Jin; 10 (China) Xing Wenbin; 13 (China) Ni Xinze; 16 (South Korea) Kim Junsang; 23 (China) Zhang Wentao; 31 (China) Wang Bin; 35 (China) Yang Sheng'ao; 53 (South Korea) Kim Gwanwoo; 91 (Dominican Republic) Braulio Vasquez; Outfielders: 6 (South Korea) Yu Sangpin; 22 (South Korea) Kim Seok Hoon; 22 (South Korea) Kook Haeseong; 29 (Venezuela) Diego Infante; 37 (Sint Maarten) Denzel Richardson; 51 (China) Kou Yongkang; 89 (Chinese Taipei) Pacidal Nikal; 90 (Cuba) Henry Urrutia; Utility players: 3 (China) Hao Jiaqi; 58 (China) Lin Ziqiang	Coaches: (South Korea) Cho Hwanseok; 63 (Chinese Taipei) Hsu Kuo-Lung; 71 (South Korea) Kang Youngsik; 77 (South Korea) Choi Kyung Hwan; 81 (Chinese Taipei) Huang Chuen-Yu; 88 (South Korea) Kim Yongdal
Roster updated on November 15, 2026

== Honors ==
=== League championships ===
- Chinese Professional Baseball
  - Summer Game champions: 2026

=== Individual awards ===
- Most Valuable Player
  - Henry Urrutia (2026 Summer Game)
- Home Run Leader
  - Denzel Richardson (2026 Summer Game)
- Gold Glove Award
  - Emerson Martinez—Pitcher (2026 Summer Game)
  - Zhang Wentao—Second Baseman (2026 Summer Game)
- Manager of the Year
  - Kim Yongdal (2026 Summer Game)
