= Touki Toussaint =

American baseball player (born 1996)

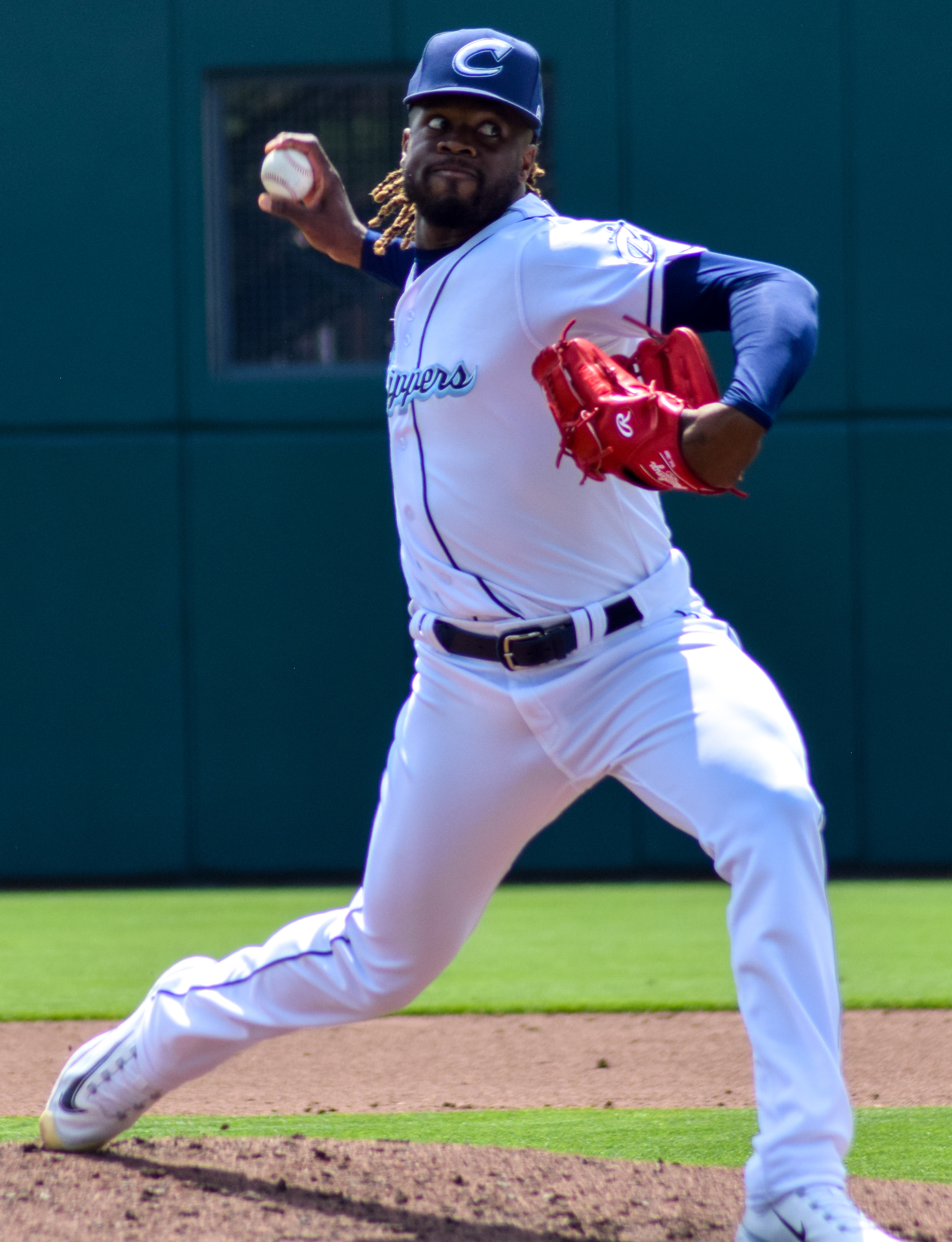
- Toussaint with the Columbus Clippers in 2023

Shenzhen Bluesox – No. 88
- Pitcher
- Born: June 20, 1996 (age 30); Pembroke Pines, Florida, U.S.
- Bats: Right Throws: Right

MLB debut
- August 13, 2018, for the Atlanta Braves

MLB statistics (through 2025 season)
- Win–loss record: 15–16
- Earned run average: 5.42
- Strikeouts: 295
- Stats at Baseball Reference

Teams
- Atlanta Braves (2018–2021); Los Angeles Angels (2022); Cleveland Guardians (2023); Chicago White Sox (2023–2024); Los Angeles Angels (2025)
Medals
Men's baseball
Representing United States
WBSC Premier12
Bronze medal – third place	2024 Tokyo	Team

Dany Gilbert Kiti "Touki" Toussaint (/ˈtuːki tuˈsɑːnt/; born June 20, 1996) is an American professional baseball pitcher for the Shenzhen Bluesox of Chinese Professional Baseball. He has previously played in Major League Baseball (MLB) for the Atlanta Braves, Los Angeles Angels, Cleveland Guardians, and Chicago White Sox. Toussaint was selected by the Arizona Diamondbacks in the first round of the 2014 MLB draft, and made his MLB debut in 2018 with the Braves.

== Amateur career ==
Toussaint was born in Pembroke Pines, Florida, to Dany Toussaint and Kahaso Kiti. He is of Haitian and Kenyan descent, and has an elder sister, Garielle. Toussaint's nickname, Touki, is a portmanteau of his parents' surnames. The family moved to Haiti when he was three months old. Toussaint and his mother moved back to Florida when he was six. He stopped playing baseball at age 10 due to a strikeout-filled season as a batter, and focused on soccer and hockey only to return to baseball two years later, following a bet with a friend.

Toussaint attended Coral Springs Charter School for his freshman year before transferring to Coral Springs Christian Academy also in Coral Springs, Florida. As a junior in 2013, Toussaint was a MaxPreps All-American after he was 6–2 with a 0.78 earned run average (ERA) and 83 strikeouts. He also hit .458 with six home runs and 32 runs batted in. He was named Broward County's Class 5A-4A-3A-2A Player of the Year. Toussaint committed to play college baseball at Vanderbilt University.

== Professional career ==
=== Arizona Diamondbacks ===
Toussaint was considered one of the top prospects for the 2014 MLB draft. The Arizona Diamondbacks selected Toussaint in the first round, 16th overall, of the draft. He signed on June 20, agreeing to a $2.7 million signing bonus, and made his professional debut with the Arizona League Diamondbacks on July 2. On August 3, he was promoted to the Missoula Osprey. Toussaint pitched his first Pioneer League game on August 8, 2014.

Toussaint finished his first professional season with a 2–4 record and an 8.48 ERA over 12 total appearances. Toussaint began the 2015 season at extended spring training, then joined the Kane County Cougars in May.

=== Atlanta Braves ===
On June 20, 2015, the Diamondbacks traded Touissant to the Atlanta Braves along with Bronson Arroyo for Phil Gosselin. He finished the 2015 season with a 4.83 ERA in 17 total starts, including a 5.73 ERA over ten starts as a member of the Rome Braves. The rocky season was attributed to the Diamondbacks' request Toussaint cut down on the use of his curveball, shortly after his debut with Kane County, as the team felt becoming excessively reliant on the pitch early in his career would lead to injury. Not throwing his curveball gave Toussaint time to improve his changeup, which became a viable third pitch over the course of the season. Toussaint spent 2016 with Rome. He struggled to begin the season, but improved after making adjustments to his pitching delivery.

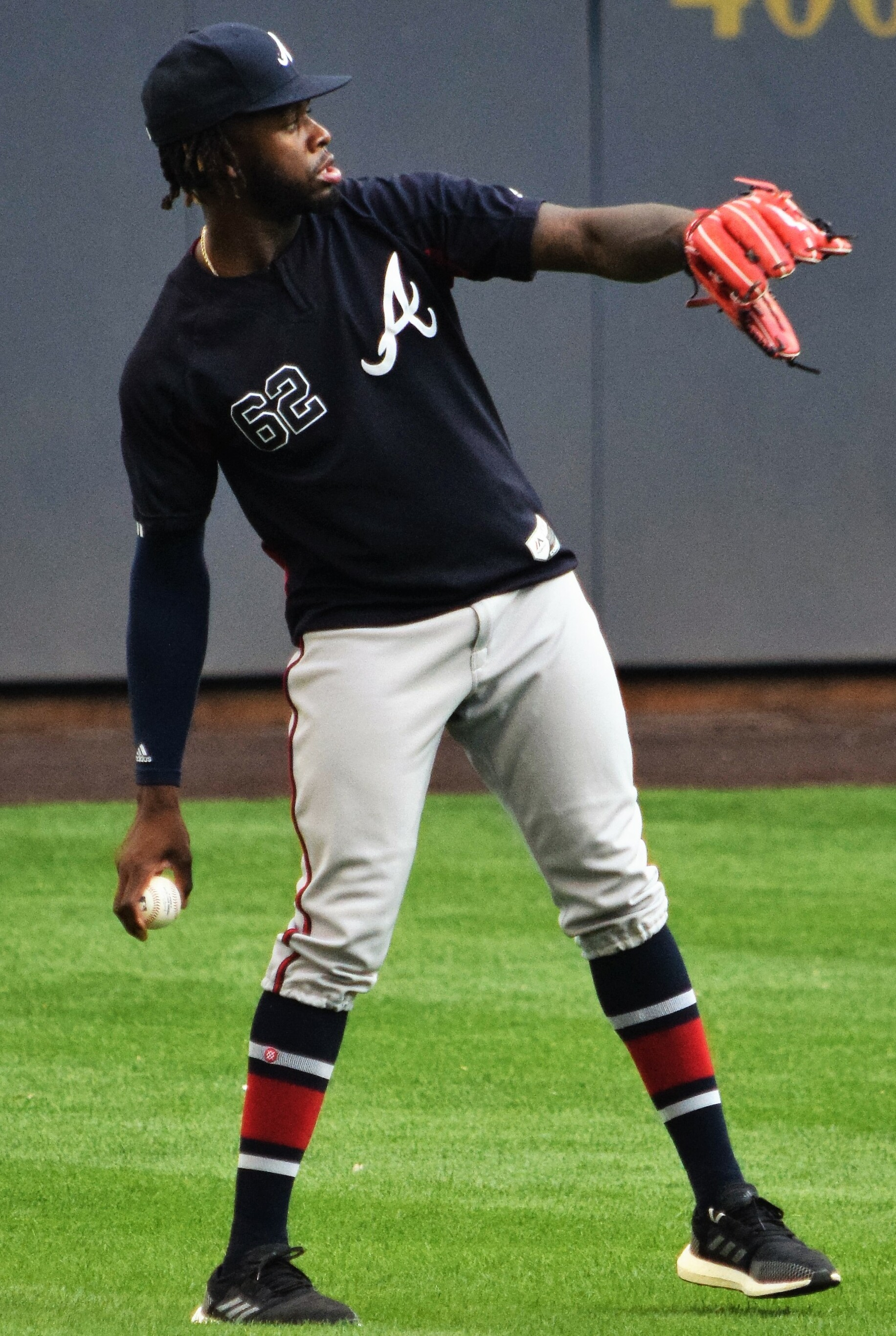
Toussaint with the Braves in 2019

Toussaint began the 2017 season with the Florida Fire Frogs and was promoted to the Mississippi Braves in late July 2017, making his Southern League debut on July 31 against the Mobile BayBears. In 145 total innings pitched between Florida and Mississippi, he pitched to a 6–13 record with a 4.53 ERA along with 167 strikeouts. He appeared in the offseason Arizona Fall League with the Peoria Javelinas. Toussaint started the 2018 season in Mississippi, recording a 2.93 ERA with 107 strikeouts until a midseason promotion to the Gwinnett Stripers. Toussaint faced the Norfolk Tides in his first International League game on July 5, 2018, pitching 6 2/3 innings while yielding one run on five hits. He was named to the All-Star Futures Game, and appeared in relief to pitch the eighth inning.

On August 13, 2018, the Braves purchased Toussaint's contract and added him to the roster. He made his MLB debut the same day with a start against the Miami Marlins, yielding one run on two hits in six innings pitched. Toussaint spent time at spring training prior to the start of the 2019 season, and began the year at Gwinnett.

On July 4, 2020, it was announced Toussaint had tested positive for COVID-19. In 2020, he was 0–2 with an 8.88 ERA over 24.1 innings.

On March 27, 2021, Toussaint was placed on the 60-day injured list with a strain in his throwing shoulder. He was activated from the injured list on July 16. In 2021 for the Braves he was 3–3 with a 4.50 ERA. The Braves finished with an 88–73 record, clinching the NL East, and eventually won the 2021 World Series, giving the Braves their first title since 1995.

The Braves designated Toussaint for assignment on July 2, 2022.

=== Los Angeles Angels ===
On July 3, 2022, the Los Angeles Angels acquired Toussaint from the Braves in exchange for cash considerations. Toussaint appeared in eight major league games for the Angels, including two starts with a 1–1 record and a 4.62 ERA and 26 strikeouts. On November 15, Toussaint was designated for assignment by the Angels after they protected multiple prospects from the Rule 5 draft. On November 18, Toussaint was non–tendered and became a free agent.

=== Cleveland Guardians ===
On January 4, 2023, Toussaint signed a minor league contract with the Cleveland Guardians. The deal included an invitation to the Guardians' 2023 major league spring training camp. He made 20 appearances for the Triple–A Columbus Clippers, logging a 4.06 ERA with 48 strikeouts and 3 saves in 37 2/3 innings pitched. On June 16, Toussaint was selected to the major league roster. He started that day against the Arizona Diamondbacks, working 3 2/3 innings and allowing 2 runs on 3 hits and 5 walks. He was designated for assignment by the Guardians the following day.

=== Chicago White Sox ===
On June 20, 2023, Toussaint was claimed off waivers by the Chicago White Sox. In 19 games (15 starts), he logged a 4–6 record and 4.97 ERA with 83 strikeouts across 83 1/3 innings pitched.

Toussaint was designated for assignment by Chicago on March 24, 2024, He cleared waivers and was sent outright to the Triple–A Charlotte Knights two days later. In 17 games (8 starts) for Charlotte, he logged a 5.15 ERA with 49 strikeouts across 50 2/3 innings pitched. On July 29, the White Sox selected Toussaint's contract, adding him to their active roster. In 11 outings for Chicago, he struggled to a 7.43 ERA with 26 strikeouts over 23 innings. Toussaint was designated for assignment by the White Sox on September 3. He cleared waivers and was sent outright to Charlotte on September 5. Toussaint elected free agency on September 30.

=== Los Angeles Angels (second stint) ===
On March 11, 2025, Toussaint signed with the Algodoneros de Unión Laguna of the Mexican League. However prior to the start of the season on March 21, Toussaint signed a minor league contract with the Los Angeles Angels, and was assigned to the Triple-A Salt Lake Bees to begin the year. On May 3, the Angels selected Toussaint's contract, adding him to their active roster. He made one appearance for Los Angeles before being designated for assignment on May 6. Toussaint cleared waivers and was sent outright to Salt Lake the next day. In 24 appearances for the Bees, he logged a 3–3 record and 7.34 ERA with 72 strikeouts and two saves across 68 2/3 innings pitched. Toussaint was released by the Angels organization on August 2. In November 2025, he pitched for the Hermosillo Naranjeros of the Mexican Pacific League.

=== Algodoneros de Unión Laguna ===
On March 5, 2026, Toussaint signed with the Algodoneros de Unión Laguna of the Mexican League. In 19 games (18 starts) he threw 76 innings going 5–4 with a 6.16 ERA and 65 strikeouts.

=== Shenzhen Bluesox ===
On August 12, 2026, Toussaint signed with the Shenzhen Bluesox of Chinese Professional Baseball.
