= DeShields =

DeShields is a surname. Notable people with the name include:

- Delino DeShields (born 1969), American baseball coach and former player
- Delino DeShields Jr. (born 1992), American baseball player
- Diamond DeShields (born 1995), American basketball player
- Dru DeShields (born 2004), American football player
- Keron DeShields (born 1992), American basketball player

== See also ==
- André De Shields (born 1946), American actor, singer, director, dancer, and choreographer
