= Kim Yeun-hun =

Kia Tigers – No. 86
- Infielder / Coach
- Born: December 23, 1984 (age 40); Gunsan, North Jeolla, South Korea
- Bats: right Throws: Right

KBO debut
- 2007, for the KIA Tigers

Teams
- As player: Kia Tigers (2007); SK Wyverns (2008–2015); KT Wiz (2016–2017); As coach: KT Wiz (2018–2025); Kia Tigers (2026–present)

- Korean name
- Hangul: 김연훈
- Hanja: 金淵訓
- RR: Gim Yeonhun
- MR: Kim Yŏnhun

Kim Yeun-hun (Korean: 김연훈; born December 23, 1984) is a coach for the KT Wiz of the KBO League. He joined KIA Tigers in 2007. He then worked at SK Wyverns from 2008 to 2015 and at KT Wiz from 2016 to 2017. He retired from playing in 2017 and is currently a coach for the KT Wiz. He graduated from Sungkyunkwan University.
