= Ray Chang (baseball) =

Chinese American baseball player

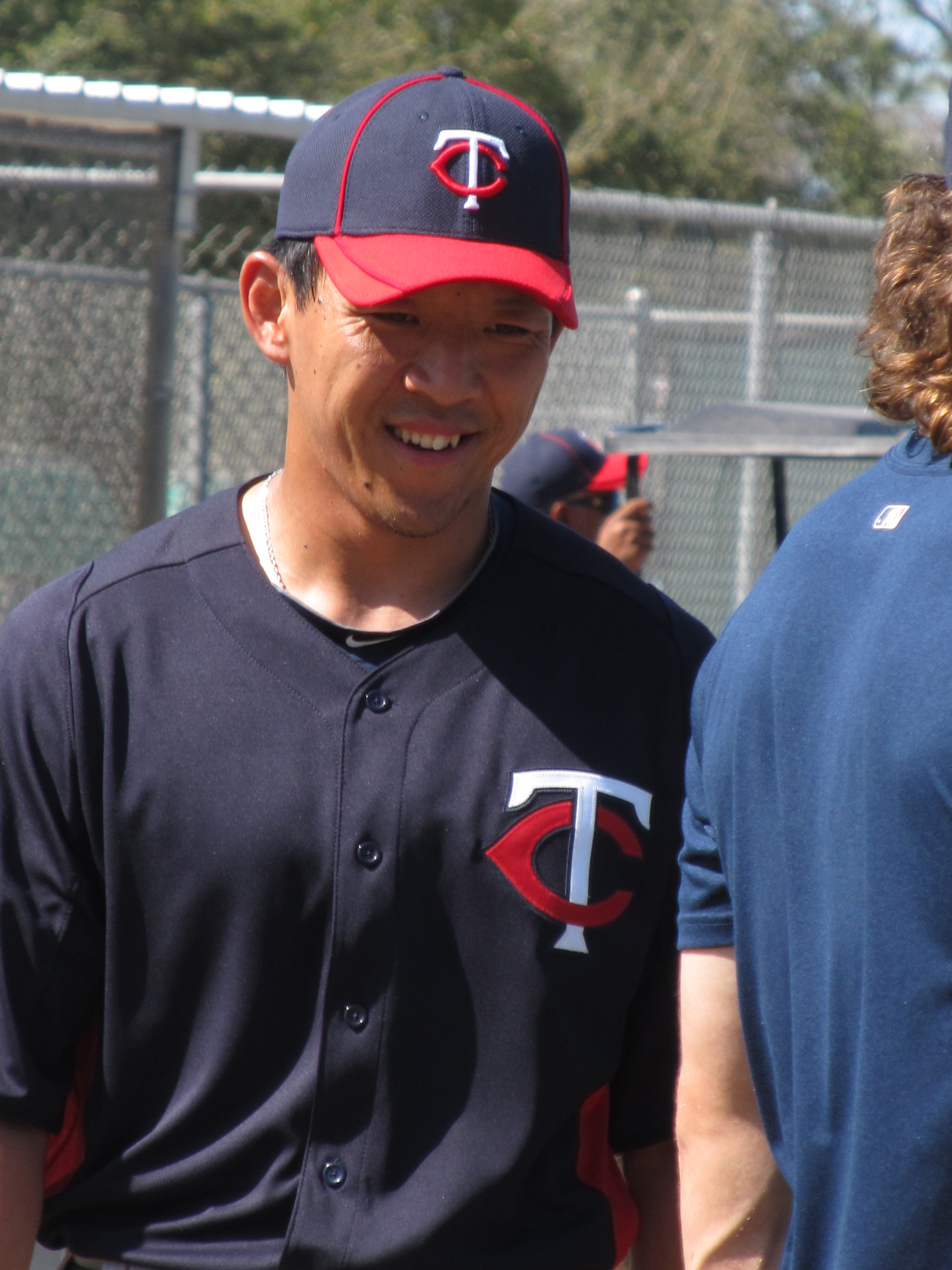
- Chang in 2012
- Infielder
- Born: August 24, 1983 (age 42); Kansas City, Missouri
- Bats: Right Throws: Right
- Stats at Baseball Reference

Raymond Bo-shue Chang (simplified Chinese: 张宝树; traditional Chinese: 張寶樹; pinyin: Zhāng Bǎoshù; Jyutping: zoeng1 bou2 syu6) (born August 24, 1983) is a Chinese American former professional baseball infielder. He played in the 2009, 2013, 2017, and 2023 World Baseball Classics for the Chinese national team and currently serves as the manager of the Shenzhen Bluesox.

== Career ==
=== San Diego Padres ===
Chang attended Rockhurst High School and played shortstop on baseball team. He enrolled at Rockhurst University, where he played college baseball from 2002 to 2005. He signed with the San Diego Padres as an undrafted free agent in 2005. That year, he split time between the rookie–level AZL Padres and High–A Lake Elsinore Storm. In 2006, he played 26 games with the Single–A Fort Wayne Wizards, hitting .286 with 26 hits and 19 runs over 91 at-bats paired with three home runs and 8 RBI. That season he also played for the Double–A Mobile BayBears and the Triple–A Portland Beavers.

In 2007, Chang split time between Lake Elsinore and Portland, where he hit a cumulative .269/.323/.381 with 4 home runs and 42 RBI. After about 30 games split between the Double-A San Antonio Missions and Triple-A Portland in 2008, Chang was released on June 9, 2008.

=== Pittsburgh Pirates ===
On June 20, 2008, Chang signed a minor league contract with the Pittsburgh Pirates organization. He finished the year with the Double–A Altoona Curve, appearing in 5 games. He split the 2009 season between the High–A Lynchburg Hillcats and Altoona, posting a .297/.385/.414 slash line with 2 home runs and 47 RBI.

=== Boston Red Sox ===
On January 20, 2010, Chang signed a minor league contract with the Boston Red Sox. Chang played the 2010 season with the Double–A Portland Sea Dogs and was named Baseball America's Best Eastern League Defensive 3rd Baseman.

=== Minnesota Twins ===
On December 13, 2010, Chang signed minor league contract with the Minnesota Twins organization. He was assigned to the Double–A New Britain Rock Cats to begin the 2011 season. In May 2011, Chang was called up to the Triple–A Rochester Red Wings and hit .250 in 28 at bats with the Red Wings as of May 11, 2011. He returned to Rochester for the 2012 season, and batted .241 in 89 games.

=== Cincinnati Reds ===
On January 4, 2013, Chang signed a minor league contract with the Cincinnati Reds organization. He split the year between the Triple-A Louisville Bats and the Double-A Pensacola Blue Wahoos, accumulating a .268/.332/.345 slash line with 3 home runs and 21 RBI. The following season, he again split the year between Louisville and Pensacola, posting a .235/.299/.302 batting line in 54 games. He elected free agency on November 4, 2014, and re-signed with the Reds organization on December 19. He spent the 2015 season in Pensacola, appearing in 88 games with the team and batting .283/.366/.371.

On September 7, 2015, Chang played all nine positions in one game, pitching a scoreless ninth inning. He split the 2016 season between Pensacola and Louisville, hitting a combined .257/.316/.304 with 20 RBI. Chang elected free agency following the season on November 7.

== International career ==
Chang was a member of the China national baseball team competing in the 2009 World Baseball Classic (WBC). Although Chang was born in the United States, he is eligible to compete for the Chinese national team because both of his parents were born in China.

Chang was one of three players, along with Zhenwang Zhang and Liu Kai, affiliated with a Major League club to make the Chinese team. As a shortstop, Chang forced the Chinese team captain, Yufeng Zhang, to move to first base. Chang homered and drove in two runs while going 3–4 with a slick defensive play to help China beat Chinese Taipei 4–1 on March 7, 2009, for China's first WBC win.

Chang was selected to play for China in the 2013 World Baseball Classic. Chang also represented China in the 2017 World Baseball Classic. The team was eliminated from 1st Round Pool play with 3 losses. He represented China in the 2023 World Baseball Classic.

On January 14, 2017, Chang retired from professional baseball and took over the baseball operations for MLB China.

Ahead of their inaugural season in 2026, the Shenzhen Bluesox of Chinese Professional Baseball named Chang their manager.
