= Delino DeShields Jr. =

American baseball player (born 1992)

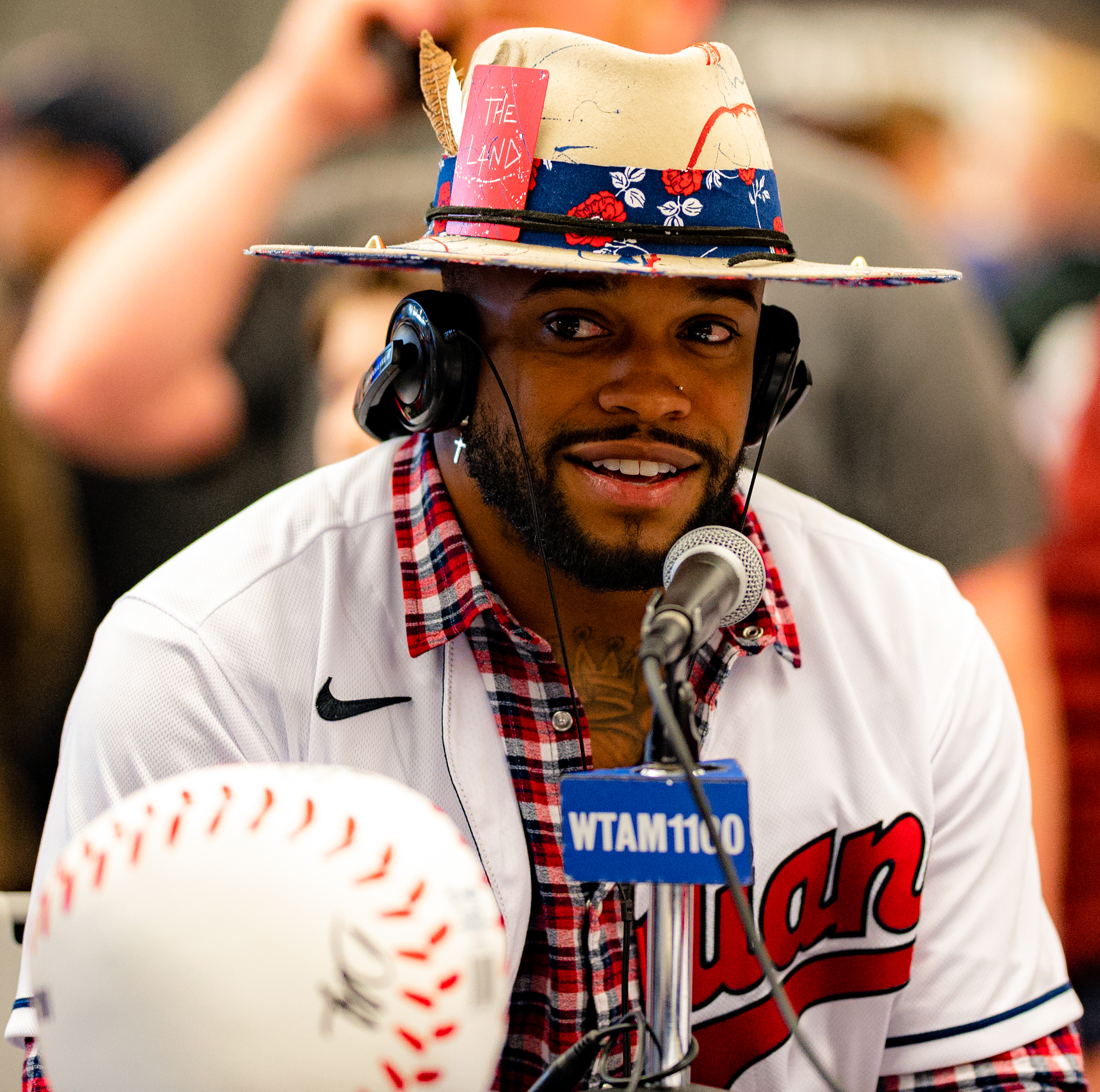
- DeShields with the Indians in February 2020

Shenzhen Bluesox – No. 3
- Outfielder
- Born: August 16, 1992 (age 34); Easton, Maryland, U.S.
- Bats: Right Throws: Right

MLB debut
- April 8, 2015, for the Texas Rangers

MLB statistics (through 2021 season)
- Batting average: .246
- Home runs: 19
- Runs batted in: 139
- Stolen bases: 111
- Stats at Baseball Reference

Teams
- Texas Rangers (2015–2019); Cleveland Indians (2020); Cincinnati Reds (2021)

Delino Diaab DeShields (Note: While commonly known as Delino DeShields Jr., DeShields and his father have different middle names.) (born August 16, 1992) is an American professional baseball center fielder for the Shenzhen Bluesox of Chinese Professional Baseball. He has previously played in Major League Baseball (MLB) for the Texas Rangers, Cleveland Indians, and Cincinnati Reds. He is the son of former MLB player Delino DeShields and the brother of basketball player Diamond DeShields.

== Early life ==
DeShields, the eldest of his father's five children, was raised in the Atlanta area. He went to Woodward Academy, where he played both baseball and football. In his senior year at Woodward, he hit 9 home runs and batted .415, while stealing 29 bases. He was recruited by the Georgia Bulldogs and Ole Miss Rebels for football before deciding to pursue baseball instead. He was also recruited by the LSU Tigers for baseball, but they only committed a half-scholarship to him due to his desire to play professionally.

== Professional career ==
=== Houston Astros ===
The Houston Astros selected DeShields in the first round, with the eighth overall selection, of the 2010 MLB draft. The Astros signed DeShields for a $2.15 million signing bonus. Astros general manager Ed Wade stated his intention to send DeShields to the rookie-level Greeneville Astros of the Appalachian League once he was signed, with a transition to second baseman during the winter.

In 2010, DeShields played 16 games for Greeneville and two for the rookie-level Gulf Coast League Astros. He also played for the Lexington Legends of the South Atlantic League, the Lancaster JetHawks of the California League, and the Corpus Christi Hooks of the Double-A Texas League. On April 18, 2014, DeShields was hit in the face by a 90-mile-per-hour (140 km/h) pitch. He suffered a non-displaced maxillary sinus fracture.

=== Texas Rangers ===
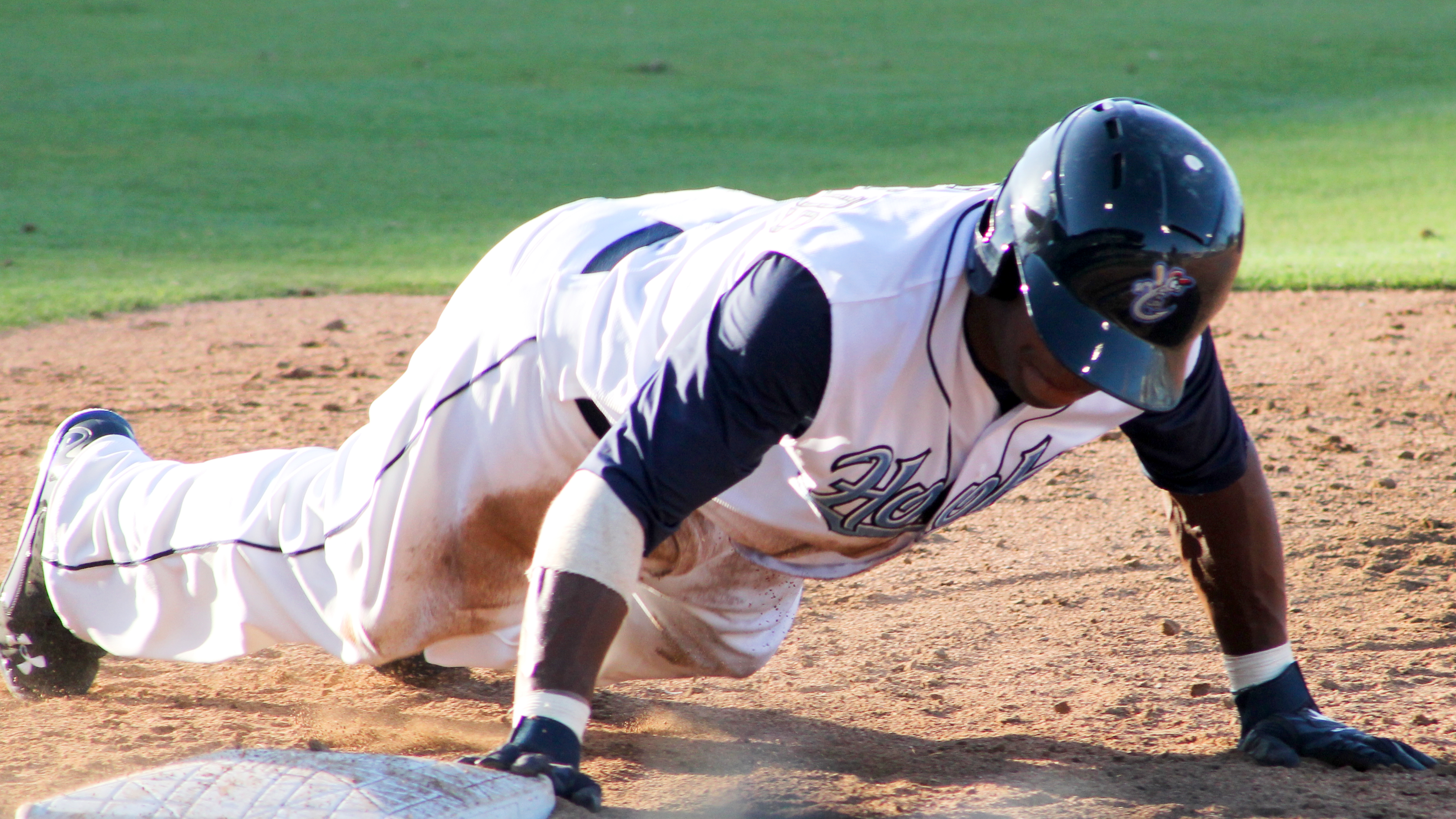
DeShields with the Corpus Christi Hooks in 2014

At the 2014 Winter Meetings, the Texas Rangers selected DeShields from the Astros in the Rule 5 draft. DeShields made the Rangers' Opening Day roster. He recorded his first major league hit in the 8th inning on an infield single against Dan Otero of the Oakland Athletics on April 8. On June 3, 2015, DeShields was named American League Rookie of the Month for May after batting .296 for the month and scoring 22 runs. On August 14, he hit his first Major League home run against Tampa Bay. After the 2015 season, DeShields changed his uniform number from 7 to 3. After the completion of the 2015 season, DeShields finished in 7th place in the American League Rookie of the Year voting, with one third place vote. He was voted as the Texas Rangers' Rookie of the Year by fellow players and coaches.

DeShields began the 2016 season as the Rangers' starting center fielder, but eventually lost his job to Ian Desmond for inconsistency and was demoted to the Triple-A Round Rock Express. DeShields finished the season with a .209 batting average, four home runs and 13 RBI with eight stolen bases in 74 games. Deshields made the 2017 Opening Day roster. On April 21, 2017, he hit a walk-off RBI single in the bottom of the 13th inning in a game against the Kansas City Royals.

On March 31, 2018, DeShields experienced pain in his left hand after swinging. He was diagnosed with a broken hamate bone in the left hand, ruling him out for four to six weeks. DeShields ended the season with a .216 batting average with two home runs and 20 stolen bases. In 2019, he hit .249/.325/.347/.672 with four home runs, 32 RBI, and 24 stolen bases.

=== Cleveland Indians ===
On December 15, 2019, the Rangers traded DeShields and Emmanuel Clase to the Cleveland Indians in exchange for Corey Kluber and cash considerations. Overall with the 2020 Cleveland Indians, DeShields batted .252 with no home runs and 7 RBI in 37 games. On December 2, 2020, the Indians declined to tender DeShields a contract for the 2021 season, making him a free agent.

=== Texas Rangers (second stint) ===
On February 1, 2021, DeShields signed a minor-league contract with the Texas Rangers organization and was invited to spring training. He was not added to the 40-man roster, and was assigned to the Triple-A Round Rock Express. DeShields played in 66 games for Round Rock, hitting .263 with 5 home runs and 18 RBI's, while also stealing 16 bases.

=== Boston Red Sox ===
On August 5, 2021, DeShields was traded to the Boston Red Sox in exchange for cash considerations. He was assigned to the Triple-A Worcester Red Sox. DeShields played in 18 games for Triple-A Worcester, hitting .210 with one home run and four RBI.

=== Cincinnati Reds ===
On August 31, 2021, DeShields was traded to the Cincinnati Reds in exchange for cash considerations. He was assigned to the Triple-A Louisville Bats. The following day, the Reds selected DeShields' contract. DeShields played in 25 games for the Reds, hitting .255 with one home run and six RBI. On October 11, DeShields rejected his outright assignment and elected free agency.

=== Miami Marlins ===
On March 18, 2022, DeShields signed a minor league contract with the Miami Marlins. DeShields collected one hit in eight plate appearances during Spring Training before he was released by the Marlins organization on April 3.

=== Atlanta Braves ===
On April 8, 2022, DeShields signed a minor league contract with the Atlanta Braves. DeShields played in 109 games for the Triple-A Gwinnett Stripers, batting .220/.367/.264 with one home run, 26 RBI, and 35 stolen bases. He elected free agency after the season on November 10.

=== Seattle Mariners ===
On March 19, 2023, DeShields signed a minor league contract with the Seattle Mariners organization. He played in 12 games for the Triple-A Tacoma Rainiers, batting .222/.300/.222 with no home runs and 2 RBI. DeShields was released by Seattle on May 1.

=== Cleburne Railroaders ===
On May 7, 2023, DeShields signed with the Cleburne Railroaders of the American Association of Professional Baseball. In 34 contests, DeShields batted .291/.380/.440 with 4 home runs, 21 RBI, and 13 stolen bases. He was released by the Railroaders on June 28.

=== Charleston Dirty Birds ===
On April 23, 2024, DeShields signed with the Charleston Dirty Birds of the Atlantic League of Professional Baseball. In 69 appearances for Charleston, he slashed .256/.371/.336 with four home runs, 33 RBI, and 36 stolen bases.

=== Piratas de Campeche ===
On February 10, 2025, DeShields signed with the Piratas de Campeche of the Mexican League. In 16 appearances for Campeche, he batted .156/.203/.203 with five RBI and five stolen bases. DeShields was released by the Piratas on May 27.

=== Washington Nationals ===
On May 28, 2025, DeShields signed a minor league contract with the Washington Nationals. He made 37 appearances for the Double-A Harrisburg Senators, batting .262/.372/.320 with six RBI and three stolen bases. DeShields elected free agency following the season on November 6.

=== Cleburne Railroaders (second stint) ===
On April 15, 2026, DeShields signed with the Cleburne Railroaders of the American Association of Professional Baseball. He appeared in 53 games for Cleburne and batted .259 with three home runs, 29 RBI, and 28 stolen bases. On August 2, DeShields was released by the Railroaders.

=== Shenzhen Bluesox ===
On August 10, 2026, DeShields signed with the Shenzhen Bluesox of Chinese Professional Baseball.

== Awards ==
For the 2018 season, DeShields received the Texas Rangers' Harold McKinney Good Guy Award as voted by the Dallas–Fort Worth Baseball Writers' Association of America (BBWAA) chapter.

== Personal life ==
DeShields is the son of former MLB player Delino DeShields. His sister, Diamond DeShields, is a professional basketball player in the WNBA. In addition to Diamond, DeShields has a brother, another sister and a paternal half-sister. DeShields was arrested and charged with driving under the influence, possession of alcohol by a minor and a traffic violation in Georgia on January 16, 2011. He was released on $2,500 bail and charged with the three misdemeanors.

== See also ==
- Rule 5 draft results
