= Lu Wen-sheng =

Taiwanese baseball player

Uni-President Lions – No. 70
- Manager, second baseman
- Born: November 30, 1962 (age 63); Kaohsiung County, Taiwan
- Bats: Right Throws: Right

CPBL debut
- March 17, 1990, for the Uni-President Lions

Career statistics
- Games: 541
- Batting average: 0.212
- Hits: 284
- Home runs: 1
- RBIs: 90
- Stolen bases: 10
- Stats at Baseball Reference

Teams
- As player: Uni-President Lions (1990–1998); As coach/manager: Macoto Gida (2003); Macoto Cobras (2004–2006); Uni-President Lions (2007–2011); Fuzhou Sea Knights (2026–present)

Career highlights and awards
- 3x Taiwan Series champion (player) (1991, 1995, 1996); 4x Taiwan Series champion (manager) (2007, 2008, 2009, 2011)

Lu Wen-sheng (Chinese: 呂文生; pinyin: Lǚ Wénshēng; Wade–Giles: Lü^{3} Wen^{2} Sheng^{1}; born November 30, 1962, in Kaohsiung County (now part of Kaohsiung City), Taiwan) is a Taiwanese retired professional baseball player and the current manager of the Fuzhou Sea Knights. He has also represented Chinese Taipei on many occasions before entering his professional career, and is sometimes named the best second baseman of his time.

== Baseball career ==
Lu began his baseball career in elementary school, and has been playing on the national team since high school. Because of his skills, he was admitted into the Hu-feng baseball team (Chinese: 虎風棒球隊), the baseball team of the Taiwan Air Force. With his solid fielding skills, he was a frequent member of the Chinese Taipei national baseball team in the 1980s and won the bronze medal in the 1984 Olympics(as demonstration sport). He join Uni-President Lions in 1989 after being invited by a former coach.

As a founding member of the Lions, Lu was well liked by his teammates and coaches. He was praised for his stable performance on the field, but had very little achievement elsewhere. When CPBL increased the number of foreign players on each team's roster in 1994, he eventually lost his position and became a backup infielder. He retired in 1998 due to age and lack of position on the team.

He took up the fielding coach position in the Lions after retiring, and later left for Macoto Gida, which is now Macoto Cobras, who offered him the same position but more opportunity. He returned to the Lions after the Cobras underwent major organizational restructuring, and first took up outfield fielding coach position, later the manager position when Lo Kuo-chang, the bench coach at the time, declined the offer. Despite the short notice before taking the job, Lu did fairly well by leading the Lions to victory in the 2007 Taiwan Series. Lu won a total of four titles in his five years tenure as manager.

In February 2012, Lu was investigated by the authority for possible leaking of information to sports betting groups. Lu admitted that he unintentionally leaked players' status to a sports betting group because he mistook them as baseball fans and was not aware that they were engaging in betting activities. He resigned his position following the incident.

Since Lu is no longer able to coach baseball in Taiwan, in March 2012 he moved to New Zealand to help former CPBL, Japanese and MILB professional player Yeh Ming-Huang coach the New Zealand U17 team who will be competing in the 2012 Asia-Pacific Senior League Baseball championships, that runs from 4–9 July in Agana, Guam, in the hope of qualifying for the World Series, held in Bangor, Maine, USA.

On his personal Facebook page, he stated that he was 'very optimistic' for the team and its players, stating that he thought the combination of himself and Coach Yeh as the coaching staff, along with the young talent in the team, could take New Zealand to its maiden World Championship Series at any age-group level.

Sources have also stated that Lu could be the front-runner for New Zealand's World Baseball Classic manager job, the only barrier at this stage being the lack of English that Lu has.

Lu became head coach for Chinese Professional Baseball's Fuzhou Sea Knights in November 2025.
