= Zhang Xiaotian =

Chinese baseball player

- Infielder / Coach
- Born: August 26, 1988 (age 37); China
- Bats: Right Throws: Right

Zhang Xiaotian (Chinese: 张小天; pinyin: Zhāng Xiǎotiān; born August 26, 1988) is a Chinese baseball infielder who serves as the operational manager for the Shanghai Dragons of Chinese Professional Baseball. He was a member of the China national baseball team competing in the 2009 World Baseball Classic. He was a coach for the 2017 World Baseball Classic.
