= Shanghai Dragons (disambiguation) =

The Shanghai Dragons are a professional ice hockey team in the Kontinental Hockey League.

Shanghai Dragons may refer to:

- Shanghai Dragons (esports)
- Shanghai Dragons (baseball), a team in Chinese Professional Baseball
