= Henry Urrutia =

Cuban baseball player (born 1987)

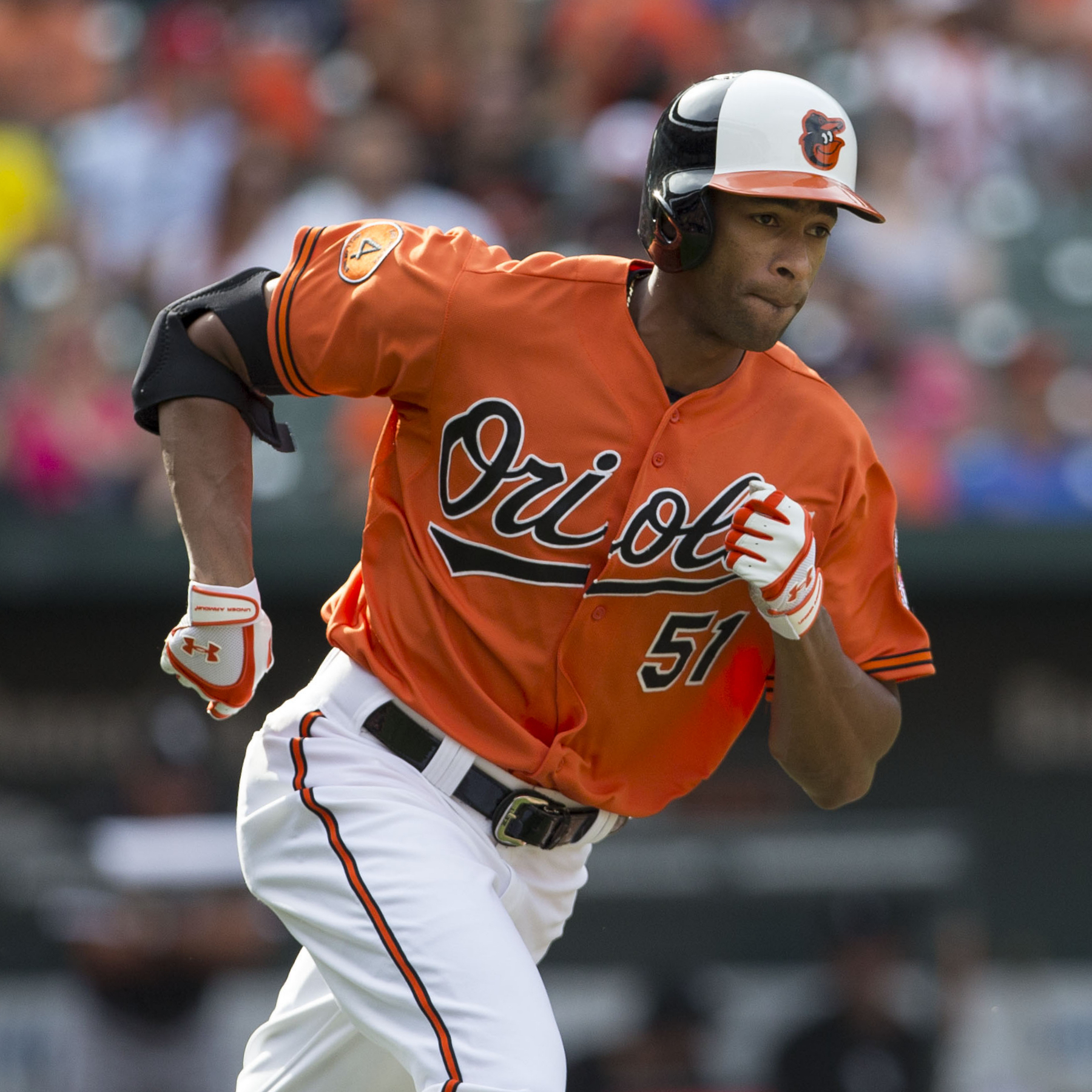
- Urrutia with the Baltimore Orioles

Conspiradores de Querétaro – No. 51
- Designated hitter / Left fielder
- Born: February 13, 1987 (age 39); Las Tunas, Cuba
- Bats: Left Throws: Right

MLB debut
- July 20, 2013, for the Baltimore Orioles

MLB statistics (through 2015 season)
- Batting average: .272
- Home runs: 1
- Runs batted in: 8
- Stats at Baseball Reference

Teams
- Baltimore Orioles (2013, 2015)

Henry Alexander Urrutia Rodríguez (/ʊəˈruːtiə/ oo-ROO-tee-ə; born February 13, 1987) is a Cuban professional baseball designated hitter and left fielder for the Conspiradores de Querétaro of the Mexican League. He has previously played in Major League Baseball (MLB) for the Baltimore Orioles.

== Professional career ==
Urrutia played in the Cuban National Series for Las Tunas. He debuted in the 2005-06 Cuban National Series, and played through 2009-10.

Urrutia attempted to defect from Cuba in 2010. After the failed attempt, he was suspended. He successfully defected to Haiti in September 2011.

=== Baltimore Orioles ===
On July 24, 2012, Urrutia signed with the Baltimore Orioles, receiving a $778,500 signing bonus.

After having trouble acquiring a visa, Urrutia reported to the Bowie Baysox of the Double-A Eastern League in April 2013. After playing 52 games for Bowie, the Orioles promoted him to the Norfolk Tides of the Triple-A International League on June 28. After playing in 15 games for Norfolk, the Orioles promoted Urrutia to the major leagues on July 19. Urrutia was optioned back on Norfolk on August 17. He was recalled on September 3. He was placed on the restricted list on September 13 when the Orioles travelled to Toronto due to visa issues, and re-activated on September 16. In 2013 for the Orioles, Urrutia batted .276/.276/.310 in 24 games.

Urrutia did not appear in the majors in 2014, instead spending the season in the minor leagues with the Triple-A Norfolk Tides. On August 19, 2015, Urrutia hit his first career home run off of New York Mets pitcher Carlos Torres. It was also his first career walk-off hit. Urrutia only played in 10 games for the Orioles in 2015, registering 9 hits in 36 plate appearances. After beginning the 2016 season in Double-A with the Bowie Baysox, Urrutia was designated for assignment by the Orioles on July 19, 2016. He began the 2017 season in Norfolk before being released by the Orioles organization on May 25, 2017.

=== Boston Red Sox ===
On June 14, 2017, Urrutia signed a minor league contract with the Boston Red Sox organization. In 73 games for the Double–A Portland Sea Dogs, Urrutia batted .284/.360/.389 with 3 home runs and 29 RBI. He elected free agency following the season on November 6.

=== Diablos Rojos del México ===
On January 29, 2018, Urrutia signed with the Diablos Rojos del México of the Mexican League. In 20 games for México, he batted .413/.466/.538 with one home run and 14 RBI.

=== Guerreros de Oaxaca ===
On August 16, 2018, Urrutia was traded to the Guerreros de Oaxaca of the Mexican League. In 17 appearances for Oaxaca, he slashed .286/.429/.446 with two home runs and 14 RBI. Urrutia became a free agent following the season.

=== Toros de Tijuana ===
On February 19, 2019, Urrutia signed with the Toros de Tijuana of the Mexican League. In 42 games for the Toros, Urrutia hit .311/.364/.482 with seven home runs, 35 RBI, and three stolen bases.

=== Saraperos de Saltillo ===
On June 4, 2019, Urrutia was traded to the Saraperos de Saltillo of the Mexican League. He played in 68 games for Saltillo, slashing .407/.467/.795 with 26 home runs and 65 RBI. Urrutia did not play in a game in 2020 due to the cancellation of the Mexican League season because of the COVID-19 pandemic.

In 2021, Urrutia played in 56 games for the Saraperos, hitting .385/.435/.606 with 12 home runs and 52 RBI. For the 2022 season, Urrutia was the Mexican League batting champion after he played in 90 games for Saltillo and hit .420/.479/.733 with 25 home runs and 88 RBI. Urrutia returned in 2023, hitting .291/.334/.496 with 18 home runs and 60 RBI. In 2024, he batted .327/.407/.463 with three home runs and 26 RBI over 42 games.

=== Bravos de León ===
On June 14, 2024, Urrutia and Rainel Rosario were traded to the Bravos de León of the Mexican League in exchange for infielders Keven Lamas and Alejandro Mejía. In 37 appearances for León, he slashed .390/.447/.539 with four home runs and 22 RBI.

Urrutia made 31 appearances for León in 2025, hitting .252/.353/.470 with four home runs and 17 RBI. Urrutia was released by the Bravos on May 28, 2025.

=== Conspiradores de Querétaro ===
On May 30, 2025, Urrutia signed with the Conspiradores de Querétaro of the Mexican League. In 54 games he hit .335/.402/.555 with 10 home runs, 34 RBIs and one stolen base.

=== Shanghai Orcas ===
On September 13, 2026, Urrutia signed with the Shanghai Orcas of the Chinese Professional Baseball.In 10 games for Shanghai, he hit .410/.744/.452 with 4 home runs, 7 RBIs and 3 stolen bases. Helped for Orcas to get the champion of 2026 Summer Game, Urrutia is the Most Valuable Player.

== Personal ==
Urrutia is the son of Ermidelio Urrutia and a cousin of Osmani Urrutia. Both his father and cousin are Cuban outfielders. He is currently married with two sons.

== See also ==
- List of baseball players who defected from Cuba
