= 2026 Senior League World Series =

Tournament details
- Country: United States
- City: Easley, South Carolina
- Dates: August 1–8, 2026
- Teams: 12

Final positions
- Champions: Pearl City, Hawaii
- Runners-up: Willemstad, Curaçao

The 2026 Senior League World Series took place from August 1–8 in Easley, South Carolina. Pearl City, Hawaii defeated Willemstad, Curaçao in the championship game.

== Teams ==
United States	International
(South Carolina) Easley, South Carolina; Easley; Host	Tanauan, Philippines; Tanauan; Asia–Pacific
Oglesby, Illinois; Illinois Valley; Central	(Queensland) Brisbane, Queensland; Brisbane North; Australia
(Delaware) Newark, Delaware; Newark National; East	(Quebec) Mirabel, Quebec; Diamond Baseball; Canada
(Georgia (U.S. state)) Macon, Georgia; Vine-Ingle; Southeast	Willemstad, Curaçao; Pabao; Caribbean
(Texas) Laredo, Texas; Laredo American; Southwest	(Czech Republic) Brno, Czechia; South Czech Republic; Europe–Africa
(Hawaii) Pearl City, Hawaii; Pearl City; West	Maracaibo, Venezuela; Coquivacoa; Latin America

== Results ==
=== United States Bracket ===
Upper round 1
–	Illinois	0
–	(Georgia (U.S. state)) Georgia	9
—	(South Carolina) Host	4
—	Texas	2
Lower round 1
0–1	Hawaii	8
0–1	Texas	5
0–1	Illinois	1
1–1	(South Carolina) Host	11

Upper round 2
—	Hawaii	1
1—0	(Georgia (U.S. state)) Georgia	4
—	Delaware	7
1—0	(South Carolina) Host	1
Lower round 2
1–1	Hawaii	11
2–1	(South Carolina) Host	0

Upper final
2–0	(Georgia (U.S. state)) Georgia	3
1–0	Delaware	4
Lower final
2–1	(Georgia (U.S. state)) Georgia	2
2–1	Hawaii	3

United States Championship
2–0	Delaware	0
3–1	Hawaii	12

=== International Bracket ===
Upper round 1
–	Australia	3
–	Venezuela	6
–	Czechia	11
–	Canada	13
Lower round 1
0–1	Czechia	0
0–1	Philippines	2
0–1	Australia	0
0–1	Curaçao	7

Upper round 2
–	Philippines	0
1–0	Venezuela	5
–	Curaçao	1
1–0	Canada	3
Lower round 2
1–1	Philippines	1
1–1	Curaçao	3

Upper final
2–0	Venezuela	12
2–0	Canada	5
Lower final
2–1	Canada	5
2–1	Curaçao	15

International Championship
3–0	Venezuela	1
3–1	Curaçao	4

=== World Championship ===
World Championship
4–1	Curaçao	0
4–1	Hawaii	5

2026 Senior League World Series Champions
Pearl City LL
Pearl City, Hawaii
