= Enrique Burgos (baseball, born 1990) =

Panamanian baseball player (born 1990)

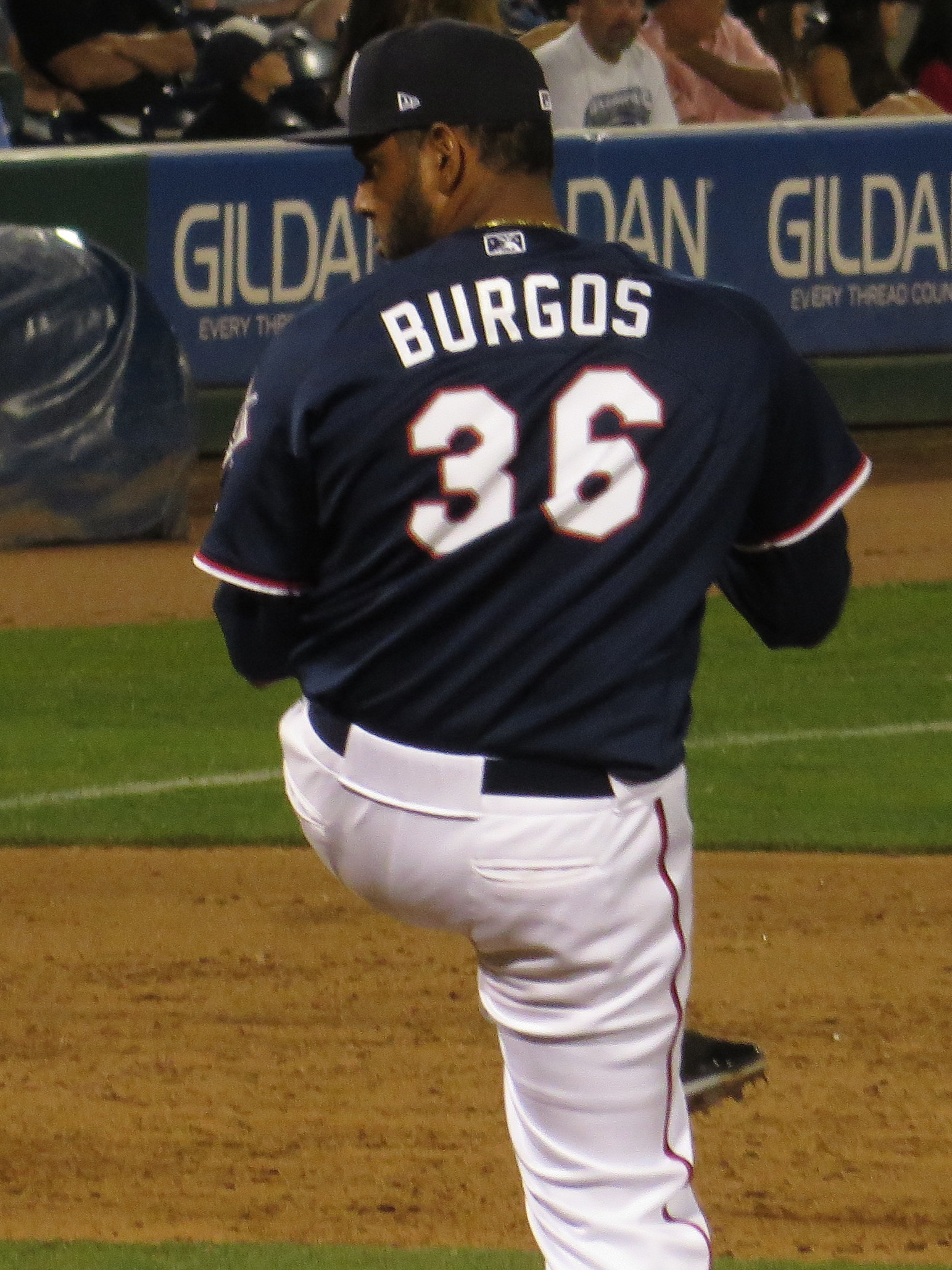
- Burgos with the Reno Aces in 2015

Shenzhen Bluesox – No. 36
- Pitcher
- Born: November 23, 1990 (age 35); Panama City, Panama
- Bats: Right Throws: Right

MLB debut
- April 29, 2015, for the Arizona Diamondbacks

MLB statistics (through 2016 season)
- Win–loss record: 3–4
- Earned run average: 5.27
- Strikeouts: 82
- Stats at Baseball Reference

Teams
- Arizona Diamondbacks (2015–2016)

Enrique Burgos Arosemena (born November 23, 1990) is a Panamanian professional baseball pitcher for the Shenzhen Bluesox of Chinese Professional Baseball. He has previously played in Major League Baseball (MLB) for the Arizona Diamondbacks.

== Early life ==
Enrique Burgos was born in Panama City, Panama. His father, Enrique Burgos, is a former left-handed pitcher who played in the minors and majors over a period of 17 years. The younger Burgos preferred soccer to baseball, but took up the latter sport at age 14 and signed with the Arizona Diamondbacks as an amateur free agent on July 19, 2007, at the age of 16.

== Career ==
=== Arizona Diamondbacks ===
Burgos was a starting pitcher during most of his seven-plus years in the minor leagues, where he demonstrated the ability to strike out batters but also had a high walk rate. His ERA during his first four seasons was 5.93. In 2012 the Diamondbacks moved him to the bullpen, where his ERA decreased to 2.35 in 2012 and 3.88 in 2013. Between 2013 and 2014, he cut his walk rate over 50 percent, from more than one walk per inning in Low-A South Bend Cubs to 4.3 walks per nine innings in High-A Visalia Rawhide. He was added to the Diamondbacks' 40-man roster on October 21, 2014.

Burgos was promoted to the major leagues for the first time on April 29, 2015. That night, he retired all three batters that he faced in the ninth inning of a Diamondbacks 9–1 win over the Colorado Rockies.

Burgos was recalled from the Triple-A Reno Aces on July 2, 2016.

Burgos was designated for assignment on May 15, 2017, to create room on the roster for Reymond Fuentes, who had his contract purchased from Triple-A.

=== Atlanta Braves ===
On May 20, 2017, Burgos was traded to the Atlanta Braves in exchange for cash considerations. On August 30, Burgos was designated for assignment by the Braves following the promotion of David Freitas. On September 3, he cleared waivers and was sent outright to the Triple-A Gwinnett Braves. In 24 games for Triple–A Gwinnett, Burgos logged a 5.24 ERA with 26 strikeouts and 2 saves in 22 1/3 innings pitched. He elected free agency following the season on November 6.

=== Guerreros de Oaxaca ===
On December 5, 2017, Burgos signed a minor league deal with the Detroit Tigers. He was released on March 28, 2018.

On July 3, 2018, Burgos signed with the Guerreros de Oaxaca of the Mexican League. In 10 games for Oaxaca, he struggled to a 6.48 ERA with 12 strikeouts across 8 1/3 innings pitched.

=== Pericos de Puebla ===
On August 16, 2018, Burgos was traded to the Pericos de Puebla of the Mexican League. In 6 appearances for Puebla, he recorded a 1.80 ERA with 2 strikeouts over 5 innings. Burgos became a free agent after the season.

=== Long Island Ducks ===
On April 2, 2019, Burgos signed with the Long Island Ducks of the Atlantic League of Professional Baseball. He appeared in 29 games for the Ducks, recording a 4–2 record and 2.43 ERA with 13 saves and 49 strikeouts in 29 2/3 innings pitched.

=== Leones de Yucatán ===
On July 19, 2019, Burgos had his contract selected by the Leones de Yucatán of the Mexican League. Burgos posted a stellar 0.59 ERA in 16 appearances for Yucatán to close out the year. Burgos did not play in a game in 2020 due to the cancellation of the Mexican League season because of the COVID-19 pandemic. In 2021, he made 25 appearances for the club, logging a 2.22 ERA with 29 strikeouts in 24 1/3 innings of work.

Burgos made 8 appearances for Yucatán in 2022, but struggled to a 7.36 ERA with 5 strikeouts in 7 1/3 innings pitched. He was released by the team on July 13, 2022.

=== Miami Marlins ===
On January 13, 2023, Burgos signed a minor league contract with the Miami Marlins organization. He made 3 appearances for the Triple-A Jacksonville Jumbo Shrimp, surrendering 6 earned runs in 3 1/3 innings pitched. Burgos was released by the Marlins on April 19.

=== Leones de Yucatán (second stint) ===
On May 22, 2023, Burgos signed with the Leones de Yucatán of the Mexican League. In 31 games for Yucatán, Burgos posted a 3.03 ERA with 37 strikeouts and 2 saves in 29 2/3 innings pitched.

=== Tecolotes de los Dos Laredos ===
On February 6, 2024, Yucatán loaned Burgos to the Tecolotes de los Dos Laredos of the Mexican League. In 7 games for Dos Laredos, Burgos compiled a 6.75 ERA with 10 strikeouts across 6 2/3 innings pitched.

=== Guerreros de Oaxaca (second stint) ===
On May 6, 2024, Burgos was traded to the Guerreros de Oaxaca of the Mexican League. In two games for Oaxaca, he recorded a 5.40 ERA with 4 strikeouts across 3 1/3 innings pitched. On May 16, Burgos was released by the Guerreros.

On December 17, 2024, Burgos signed a contract to return to the Leones de Yucatán of the Mexican League. He was released by Yucatán prior to the start of the season on April 16, 2025.

=== Saraperos de Saltillo ===
On May 27, 2025, Burgos signed with the Saraperos de Saltillo of the Mexican League. In 11 appearances for Saltillo, he struggled to an 8.68 ERA with eight strikeouts across 9 1/3 innings pitched. Burgos was released by the Saraperos on July 14.

=== Shenzhen Bluesox ===
On December 23, 2025, Burgos signed with the Shenzhen Bluesox of the Chinese Professional Baseball League.

== International career ==
Before the 2019 season, he was selected for Panama national baseball team at the 2019 Pan American Games Qualifier.

In 2022, Burgos was selected to represent Panama at the 2023 World Baseball Classic qualification.
