= Dae-sung Koo =

Korean baseball player (born 1969)

Koo Dae-sung
- Pitcher
- Born: August 2, 1969 (age 57); Daejeon, South Korea
- Batted: Left Threw: Left

Professional debut
- KBO: May 1, 1993, for the Binggrae Eagles
- NPB: March 24, 2001, for the Orix BlueWave
- MLB: April 4, 2005, for the New York Mets

Last appearance
- KBO: September 3, 2010, for the Hanwha Eagles
- NPB: September 27, 2004, for the Orix BlueWave
- MLB: August 20, 2005, for the New York Mets

KBO statistics
- Win–loss record: 67–71
- Saves: 214
- Earned run average: 2.85
- Strikeouts: 1,221

NPB statistics
- Win–loss record: 24–34
- Saves: 10
- Earned run average: 3.86
- Strikeouts: 504

MLB statistics
- Win–loss record: 0–0
- Earned run average: 3.91
- Strikeouts: 23
- Stats at Baseball Reference

Teams
- Binggrae Eagles / Hanwha Eagles (1993–2000); Orix BlueWave (2001–2004); New York Mets (2005); Hanwha Eagles (2006–2010)

Career highlights and awards
- KBO MVP (1996); KBO Golden Glove Award winner (1996); Korean Series champion (1999); Korean Series MVP (1999)
Medals
Olympic Games
Representing South Korea
Bronze medal – third place	2000 Sydney	Team

- Dae-sung Koo
- Hangul: 구대성
- Hanja: 具臺晟
- RR: Gu Daeseong
- MR: Ku Taesŏng

Koo Dae-sung (Korean: 구대성; Hanja: 具臺晟; born August 2, 1969) is a Korean former professional baseball pitcher. A left-handed pitcher, Koo formerly played for the Hanwha Eagles in the KBO League, as well as the New York Mets of Major League Baseball and the Orix BlueWave of Nippon Professional Baseball. He announced his retirement from Korean baseball on August 15, 2010. He last played for Geelong-Korea in the Australian Baseball League. Since November 2025, Koo has served as the manager for the Shanghai Dragons of Chinese Professional Baseball.

== Early life ==
Koo is a left-handed pitcher despite being born right-handed. As a child, he broke his right arm, an injury so bad that it forced him to become left-handed. Koo attended Hanyang University.

== Professional career ==
=== Hanwha Eagles ===
Koo began his professional career in 1993 with the Hanwha Eagles of the KBO League. In 1996, he won both a Gold Glove Award and the MVP of the KBO with a 1.88 earned run average, 18 wins, 24 saves and 183 strikeouts in 139 innings pitched.

Koo played for the South Korean national Olympic team in the 2000 games. He led his team to a bronze medal in 2000 by pitching a 3-1 complete game victory over Japan.

=== Orix BlueWave ===
In 2001, Koo joined the Orix BlueWave of the Japanese Pacific League. Though he was a reliever throughout his professional career, he became a starter for the team in 2002, recording the second best earned run average on the team. The Orix BlueWave merged with the Osaka Kintetsu Buffaloes in 2004, and he took the opportunity to announce his decision to play in the major leagues.

=== New York Mets ===
In 2005, the New York Mets signed Koo as a free agent. He pitched well as a reliever during spring training and was selected for the Mets' active roster as the season began. Despite his 35 years of age, and 12 years experience in Korea and Japan, he was considered a rookie by Major League Baseball in his first year. He made his Major League Debut on April 4, 2005, against the Cincinnati Reds, and pitched a perfect 8th inning, in the process collecting his first big league strikeout.

Koo's most recognized moment as a Major Leaguer occurred on May 21, 2005, when he recorded his only major league hit, a double off of Randy Johnson of the New York Yankees.

This came right when Fox TV analyst Tim McCarver commented on how Koo's plate appearance was "the biggest give-up at-bat". Koo had taken two pitches and struck out looking on four pitches in his first at-bat two weeks prior. On a 1-and-1 count, Koo hit a deep line drive over Bernie Williams's head, one-hopping off the wall in right-center field. Upon reaching second base, the home crowd and his teammates in the dugout cheered and chanted "KOOOO!" A slow runner with little base running experience, Koo advanced to third base on a sacrifice bunt dropped by the following hitter, José Reyes. After Koo slowed down approaching third base, he re-accelerated and ran towards a vacant home plate left uncovered as Reyes was getting thrown out at first base. Yankees' catcher Jorge Posada promptly ran towards home in a foot race with Koo. Upon retrieving the thrown ball from first base, Posada applied the tag onto Koo's left shoulder as he slid head first towards home plate on a close play. Home plate umpire Chuck Meriwether called Koo safe on the play, extending the Mets' lead to 3–0. His teammates enthusiastically greeted him in the dugout as chants of "KOOOO!" reignited. On his reception by his teammates, Koo said, "They said a lot of things. I just couldn't understand what. I think they were saying 'Good job.'"

It was his second-and-final Major League at-bat. MLB.com reported that the only reason the reliever was allowed to hit was because Mets manager Willie Randolph "wanted the lefty specialist Koo to face then-rookie Robinson Canó leading off the next inning." When asked later about what he thought about the hit, Koo responded, "Other people say that I swung my bat with my eyes closed. But, of course I saw it — I hit it! It has been 18 years since I batted last — when I was in high school. Occasionally I went to the batting cages and swung the bat a couple of times. But, there really wasn't any difference."

Koo suffered a shoulder injury while sliding into home plate during the play. His stats suffered thereafter, precipitating his return to South Korean baseball.

=== Return to Korea ===
On March 2, 2006, Koo rejoined the Hanwha Eagles when the Mets sold his contract to them.

=== Sydney Blue Sox ===
In a press conference on August 22, 2010, Koo revealed he was to play for the Sydney Blue Sox in the Australian Baseball League. Koo made his debut in the opening game of the 2010–11 Australian Baseball League regular season. With his team up 1–0 against the Canberra Cavalry, he recorded the final out by striking out Nick Kimpton to earn the first save in the Australian Baseball League. He finished the season with 12 saves, 1.00 earned run average and .144 opposition average against. Owing to this performance, Koo was named Reliever of the Year.

After spending the first two seasons as the Blue Sox closer, he was shifted into the 8th inning role when Matthew Williams took over as the team's closer. However, in the 2013–14 season, Williams moved to the Adelaide Bite and Koo was once again named Sydney's closer, posting a stellar 2.08 earned run average with 11 saves.

In four seasons of the Australian Baseball League, Koo had a 2.16 earned run average with 31 saves.

In 2016, Koo was the pitching coach for the Blue Sox.

=== Team Australia ===
Koo was selected for the Australian national baseball team in two spring training exhibition matches against the Los Angeles Dodgers and the Arizona Diamondbacks.

=== Geelong-Korea ===
After managing Geelong-Korea for two seasons, Koo came out of retirement, pitching an inning, at 48 years old — making him the oldest player to have played in the Australian Baseball League. On January 19, 2023, Koo came out of retirement for the second time to play against the Adelaide Giants, breaking his own record in the process, at 53 years old. He pitched one inning and recorded two strikeouts. He then pitched two more times on subsequent nights, recording one hit, two walks, and two unearned runs against six batters.

=== Shanghai Dragons ===
In November 2025, Koo became the head coach for the Shanghai Dragons in Chinese Professional Baseball.

== See also ==
- List of KBO career saves leaders
