= Changsha Want Want =

Professional baseball team based in Changsha, China

- 长沙旺旺

Information
- League: Chinese Professional Baseball
- Location: Changsha
- Established: November 10, 2025; 7 months ago
- Colors: Black, red, white
- Manager: Zhong Renxiang

Changsha Want Want (Chinese: 长沙旺旺; pinyin: Chángshā Wàngwàng) is a professional baseball team based in Changsha, China. The team was established in 2025 as a founding franchise for Chinese Professional Baseball (CPB). The team is sponsored by Want Want, a Taiwanese food and media company with a mainland Chinese subsidiary based in Changsha.

== History ==
The establishment of Want Want, originally announced as Want Want Happy, was announced ahead of the CPB's first draft on November 10, 2025, the first team to be officially announced. The team was originally expected to begin play in the CPB Spring League beginning January 1, 2026, but announced in December 2025 that they would not begin play until the Summer League in July, citing the need to continue "intensive training and preparations".

Former Fubon Guardians outfielder Wang Shih-tsung was drafted by the team in November 2025.

The team's name was revised simply to "Want Want" during the Summer League draft in 2026.
