= Kang Young-sik =

South Korean baseball player

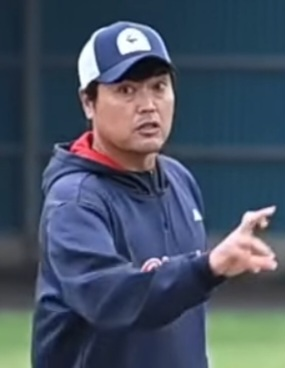
- Relief pitcher
- Born: June 17, 1981 (age 44); Daegu
- Bats: Left Throws: Left

KBO debut
- April 7, 2000, for the Haitai Tigers

KBO statistics (through 2016)
- Win–loss record: 32–31
- Earned run average: 4.31
- Strikeouts: 649
- Holds: 116
- Saves: 11
- Stats at Baseball Reference

Teams
- As player: Haitai Tigers (2000); Samsung Lions (2001–2006); Lotte Giants (2007–2017); As coach: Lotte Giants (2019–2023); Samsung Lions (2024–2025)

- Kang Young-sik
- Hangul: 강영식
- Hanja: 姜永植
- RR: Gang Yeongsik
- MR: Kang Yŏngsik

Kang Young-sik (Korean: 강영식; born June 17, 1981) is a South Korean professional baseball pitcher currently playing for the Lotte Giants of the KBO League.
