= 2026 American Association season =

21st annual season of American Association Baseball

- League: American Association of Professional Baseball
- Sport: Baseball
- Duration: May 14 – September 7
- Games: 100
- Teams: 12

East Division

West Division

Miles Wolff Cup Finals

Seasons
- ← 2025 2027 →

The 2026 American Association season will be the 21st season of professional baseball in the American Association of Professional Baseball (AA) since its creation in October 2005. There are 12 AA teams, split evenly between the East Division and the West Division.

The Kane County Cougars will enter the season as the defending champions, having defeated the Sioux Falls Canaries three games to two, in the league's 2025 championship series. As champions, the Cougars began the 2026 season by representing the American Association at the 2026 Baseball Champions League Americas tournament, which they also won.

== Season Schedule ==
The league is split up into two divisions, the East and West Division. The season will be played with a 100-game schedule, with two home series and two road series inside a teams’ division, and one home series and one road series against the clubs outside its division. The top four teams in each division will qualify for the 2026 playoffs.

The league announced that the 2026 All-Star Game would take place at Haymarket Park, the home of the Lincoln Saltdogs. The Home Run Derby and the All-Star Game will take place on Wednesday, July 15th.

== Season Standings ==
As of September 7, 2026

East Division Regular Season Standings
Pos	Team	G	W	L	Pct.	GB
1	y – Milwaukee Milkmen	100	58	42	.580	--
2	x – Lake Country DockHounds	100	56	44	.560	2.0
3	x – Kane County Cougars	99	54	45	.545	3.5
4	x – Cleburne Railroaders	100	49	51	.490	9.0
5	e – Gary SouthShore RailCats	99	42	57	.424	15.5
6	e – Chicago Dogs	100	31	69	.310	27.0

West Division Regular Season Standings
Pos	Team	G	W	L	Pct.	GB
1	y – Kansas City Monarchs	100	59	41	.590	--
2	x – Winnipeg Goldeyes	100	54	46	.540	5.0
3	x – Fargo-Moorhead RedHawks	100	53	47	.530	6.0
4	x – Sioux Falls Canaries	100	50	50	.500	9.0
5	e – Sioux City Explorers	100	49	51	.490	10.0
6	e – Lincoln Saltdogs	100	44	56	.440	15.0

- y – Clinched division
- x – Clinched playoff spot
- e – Eliminated from playoff contention

== Statistical Leaders ==
as of May 14, 2026

=== Hitting ===
Stat	Player	Team	Total
HR	TBD	TBD	
AVG	TBD	TBD	
H	TBD	TBD	
RBIs	TBD	TBD	
SB	TBD	TBD	

=== Pitching ===
Stat	Player	Team	Total
W	TBD	TBD	
ERA	TBD	TBD	
SO	TBD	TBD	
SV	TBD	TBD	

== Awards ==
=== All-star selections ===
==== East Division ====
Elected starters
Position	Player	Team
C		
1B		
2B		
3B		
SS		
OF		
OF		
OF		
DH		

Reserves
Position	Player	Team

Pitchers
Player	Team

==== West Division ====
Elected starters
Position	Player	Team
C		
1B		
2B		
3B		
SS		
OF		
OF		
OF		
DH		

Reserves
Position	Player	Team

Pitchers
Player	Team

All-star game MVP — Jaxx Groshans (Chicago Dogs)

Home Run Derby Champion — Jose Sermo (Fargo-Moorehead Redhawks)

=== End-of-year awards ===
Award	Player	Team
Most Valuable Player	TBD	TBD
Pitcher of the Year	TBD	TBD
Rookie of the Year	TBD	TBD
Manager of the Year	TBD	TBD

=== Postseason All-Stars ===
Position	Player	Team
Catcher	TBD	TBD
First base	TBD	TBD
Second base	TBD	TBD
Third base	TBD	TBD
Shortstop	TBD	TBD
Outfield	TBD	TBD
Outfield	TBD	TBD
Outfield	TBD	TBD
Utility	TBD	TBD
Designated hitter	TBD	TBD
Starting pitcher	TBD	TBD
Relief pitcher	TBD	TBD

== Playoffs ==
=== Playoff bracket ===
Division Playoff Series (best-of-three)
1	Milwaukee Milkmen	4	2	4
4	Cleburne Railroaders	1	5	0
East
2	Lake Country DockHounds	7	9	3
3	Kane County Cougars	9	7	5
1	Kansas City Monarchs	12	1	7
4	Sioux Falls Canaries	6	3	3
West
2	Winnipeg Goldeyes	1	5
3	Fargo-Moorhead RedHawks	5	6

Division Championship Series (best-of-five)
1	Milwaukee Milkmen	3	13	3	7
3	Kane County Cougars	4	0	0	1
1	Kansas City Monarchs	6	4	7	3	10
3	Fargo-Moorhead RedHawks	4	5	3	6	9

Miles Wolff Cup Finals (best-of-five)
1	Milwaukee Milkmen	0
1	Kansas City Monarchs	2

== Notable players ==
Former Major League Baseball players who played in the American Association in 2026

- TBD

== See also ==
- 2026 Frontier League season
- 2026 Major League Baseball season
- 2026 Pecos League season
