= Delino DeShields =

American baseball player & coach (born 1969)

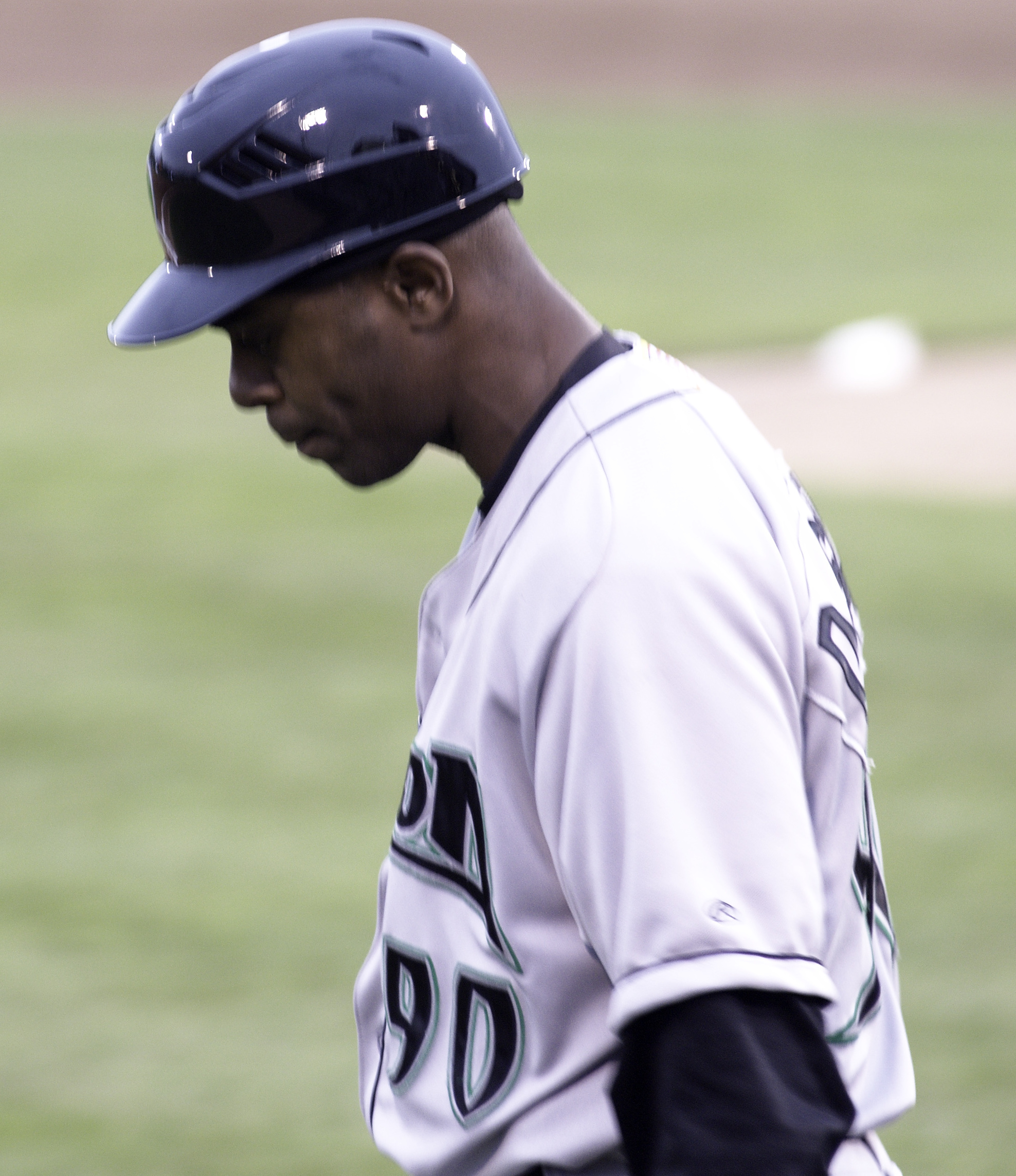
- DeShields managing the Dayton Dragons in 2011
- Second baseman
- Born: January 15, 1969 (age 57); Seaford, Delaware, U.S.
- Batted: Left Threw: Right

MLB debut
- April 9, 1990, for the Montreal Expos

Last MLB appearance
- August 8, 2002, for the Chicago Cubs

MLB statistics
- Batting average: .268
- Home runs: 80
- Runs batted in: 561
- Stolen bases: 463
- Stats at Baseball Reference

Teams
- As player: Montreal Expos (1990–1993); Los Angeles Dodgers (1994–1996); St. Louis Cardinals (1997–1998); Baltimore Orioles (1999–2001); Chicago Cubs (2001–2002); As coach: Cincinnati Reds (2022)

Delino Lamont DeShields (born January 15, 1969), also nicknamed "Bop", is an American former professional baseball second baseman and current baseball coach. He played for 13 seasons in Major League Baseball (MLB) for the Montreal Expos, Los Angeles Dodgers, St. Louis Cardinals, Baltimore Orioles, and Chicago Cubs between 1990 and 2002. He is currently the manager of the minor league Harrisburg Senators, the Double-A affiliate of the Washington Nationals.

His son Delino DeShields Jr. played in MLB for seven seasons, and his daughter Diamond DeShields played for the Chicago Sky in the WNBA.

== Early life ==
DeShields was born in Seaford, Delaware where he was raised by his mother and grandmother. He was an All-American in baseball and basketball at Seaford High School. DeShields signed a letter of intent to play college basketball at Villanova University. However, after being selected as the 12th overall pick in the 1987 MLB draft, he chose a career in baseball.

== Career ==
=== Montreal Expos ===
DeShields signed for $130,000 with the Montreal Expos.

He made his Major League debut on Opening Day of the 1990 season. He recorded four hits in his debut, the most for a debutant in the National League since Mack Jones 29 seasons earlier. He became the regular second baseman for the Expos in 1990, finishing in second place for the NL Rookie of the Year award. He suffered from a sophomore slump in 1991, but went on to post his two best years in 1992 and 1993, hitting .294 and averaging 45 stolen bases.

=== Los Angeles Dodgers ===
On November 19, 1993, DeShields was traded to the Los Angeles Dodgers for then-prospect Pedro Martínez. In retrospect, this is considered one of the worst trades in Dodgers history. DeShields hit .241 during his three years in Los Angeles, while Martinez went on to win three Cy Young Awards and established himself among the greatest pitchers of all time.

=== St. Louis, Baltimore and Chicago ===
In November 1996, DeShields signed as a free agent with the St. Louis Cardinals. In December 1998, he signed with the Baltimore Orioles. On April 4, 2001, he was the last out in Hideo Nomo's no-hitter against the Baltimore Orioles. In July 2001, the Orioles released DeShields and he signed with the Chicago Cubs.

== Post-playing career ==
DeShields is the co-founder of the Urban Baseball League. He also travels with Oil Can Boyd to promote baseball in African American communities.

=== Cincinnati Reds organization ===
DeShields managed the Dayton Dragons, a single-A affiliate of the Cincinnati Reds, in the 2011 and 2012 seasons. On December 12, 2012, it was announced that DeShields would become the manager for the Reds Double-A minor league team, the Pensacola Blue Wahoos for the 2013 season. On December 1, 2014, DeShields became manager of the Louisville Bats, replacing Jim Riggleman.

After spending the 2022 season as the Cincinnati Reds' first base and baserunning coach, DeShields was fired on October 6, 2022, following a season that saw Cincinnati lose 100 games.

=== Washington Nationals organization ===
In 2023, he became the manager of the Harrisburg Senators, the Washington Nationals Double-A affiliate.

== Personal ==
DeShields is married to Michelle Elliott DeShields, an educator and television host for the PBS series Georgia Traveler airing on Georgia Public Broadcasting. He has five children; two from his first marriage, Delino Jr. and Diamond, along with three from his current marriage, D'Angelo, Denim and Delaney. Two children from his earlier marriage followed in his footsteps and became professional athletes. Delino Jr. was an outfielder in Major League Baseball from 2015 to 2021, and Diamond plays for the Chicago Sky of the Women's National Basketball Association (WNBA).

== Highlights ==
- Named State Baseball Player of the Year in 1986.
- Placed second in Rookie of the Year Award voting in 1990
- Led National League in triples (14, 1997)
- Nine-time top 10 finisher among NL base stealers (1990–98)
- His career 463 stolen bases ranks him 44th on the all-time list
- Wore his socks just below the knee, to honor the players of the defunct Negro leagues
- Inducted into the Delaware Sports Museum and Hall of Fame in 2006.
- Inducted into the Eastern Shore Baseball Foundation Hall of Fame and Museum in 2010.

== See also ==
- List of Major League Baseball career stolen bases leaders
- List of Major League Baseball annual triples leaders
- List of second-generation Major League Baseball players
