= Fuzhou Sea Knights =

Professional baseball team based in Fuzhou, China

- 福州海侠
- Logo

Information
- League: Chinese Professional Baseball
- Location: Fuzhou
- Established: November 20, 2025; 2 months ago
- Colors: Dark blue, blue, white
- Manager: Lu Wen-sheng
- Website: Official website

The Fuzhou Sea Knights (Chinese: 福州海侠; pinyin: Fúzhōu Hǎixiá) are a professional baseball team in Fuzhou, China. The team was established in 2025 as a founding franchise for Chinese Professional Baseball (CPB). The Sea Knights are sponsored by Taiwan-based Han Yuan Investment and claim to promote Fuzhou City's goal of enhancing cross-strait baseball culture; the Chinese name of the team is also a homonym for "strait".

== History ==
The establishment of the Fuzhou Sea Knights was announced during the CPB's first draft in November 2025. Lu Wen-sheng, former player and manager for the Uni-President 7-Eleven Lions (CPBL) in Tainan, was selected as the team's manager and head coach. Former MLB and CPBL pitcher Chin-Hui Tsao signed with the Sea Knights at 44 years old but was not placed on the roster in the Spring League.

== Roster ==
Fuzhou Sea Knights roster
| Active roster | | Coaches |
| Pitchers: 48 (Taiwan) Chang Tsung Wei; 24 (Taiwan) Chen Bo Han; 16 (China) Cheng Jiaxing; 17 (China) Huang Zhaoxiang; 44 (Hong Kong) Kwok Ching; 38 (Hong Kong) Leung Ka Ho; 77 (China) Lu Xinyi; 34 (Hong Kong) Mok Chun Pui; 19 (Palestine) David Powres; 94 (Hong Kong) Wong Sze Chun; 54 (China) Yang Mo; 26 (China) Zhang Yinfan; 23 (China) Zhou Xi Ran | Catchers: 20 (Taiwan) Chen Chieh-lin; 15 (Taiwan) Kuo Chunwei; 30 (China) Lü Xiuxin; 29 (United States) Luke Shahin-Kubty; 4 (Hong Kong) Tam Ho Ki; 55 (Taiwan) Tsai Tsung-hsiu; 8 (China) Zhan Shangyu; Infielders: 21 (Palestine) Dylan Ahmad; 18 (Hong Kong) Cheng Hoi Ting; 10 (Taiwan) Huang Yung-chuan; 93 (China) Jiang Yulin; 6 (United States) Henry Kusiak; Outfielders: 69 (Taiwan) Lo Yun-hsu; 66 (Hong Kong) Ng Yau Pang; 22 (United States) Dillon Thomas; 11 (Hong Kong) Tsz Yin Jordan Wen; 68 (China) Yi Shuai; Utility players: 7 (Germany) Lou Martin Helmig | Manager: 70 (Taiwan) Lu Wen-sheng; Coaches: 27 (Taiwan) Chen Shao Fu; 13 (Taiwan) Chiu Min-shun; 85 (Taiwan) Chou Sen-i; 1 (Taiwan) Yeh Ming-huang |
Roster updated on January 28, 2026
