= Xiamen Dolphins =

Professional baseball team based in Xiamen, China

- 厦门海豚
- Logo

Information
- League: Chinese Professional Baseball
- Location: Xiamen
- Established: November 2025; 11 months ago
- Manager: Lin Ke-qian
- Website: Official website

The Xiamen Dolphins (Chinese: 厦门海豚; pinyin: Xiàmén Hǎitún) are a professional baseball team in China. The team was established in 2025 as a founding franchise for Chinese Professional Baseball (CPB).

== History ==
The establishment of the Xiamen Dolphins was announced during the CPB's first draft in November 2025. Tsai Tung-chih (蔡东志; 蔡東誌), a former pitcher and pitching coach for the Sinon Bulls (CPBL) in Taichung, was selected as the team's manager and head coach. The team was noted for having drafted Taiwanese players to fill half of its roster, led by Teoh Xi-kai (张喜凯; 張喜凱) of the TSG Hawks (CPBL), despite the rescission of a CPB rule requiring each team to include at least 10 players from Taiwan, Hong Kong, or Macao.

Lin Ke-qian was appointed as head coach prior to the 2026 CPB Summer League.

== Roster ==
Xiamen Dolphins roster
Active roster		Coaches
Pitchers: 9 (Venezuela) Emilio Marquez; 12 (Dominican Republic) Yeury Gervacio; 45 (Dominican Republic) Henry Henry; 31 (Cuba) Pavel Hernandez; 99 (China) Hu Mengkui; 11 (Japan) Yuta Iwasaki; 73 (Taiwan) Li Chia-hsiang; 17 (Japan) Isaki Ninomiya; 69 (Taiwan) Su Chieh-en; 70 (Taiwan) Teoh Xi-kai; 14 (Cuba) Andy Vargas; 78 (Japan) Aki Watanabe; 3 (China) Lixuan Yang; 15 (China) Yi Jian	Catchers: 39 (Taiwan) Hu Jia-long; 68 (China) Wang Jun; 35 (Japan) Takumi Kimoto; Infielders: 13 (Taiwan) Chen Luo-yang; 32 (Taiwan) Chung Kuo-hua; 36 (Taiwan) Hsu Zi-shen; 8 (Taiwan) Huang Kun-hao; 50 (China) San Kang; 1 (Taiwan) Lin Po-yi; 71 (China) Lu Yun; 44 (Taiwan) Wang Wei-chen; 20 (Taiwan) Yang Hao-jan; 27 (China) Zhang Aiqi; Outfielders: 51 (Cuba) Yasiel González; 33 (Taiwan) Lee Jen-hao; 7 (Cuba) José Noroña; 43 (Taiwan) Pan Chen-yu; 52 (China) Su Yongquan; 0 (China) Wang Ziqi	Manager: 88 (Taiwan) Chiang Tai-chuan; Coaches: (Taiwan) Kuoi Tai-chi; 97 (Taiwan) Lin Ko-chien; (China) Liu Ye; (China) Wang Chao; (China) Wang Zhe
Roster updated on August 15, 2026
