= Shenzhen Bluesox =

Professional baseball team based in Shenzhen, China

- 深圳蓝袜

Logo	Cap insignia

Information
- League: Chinese Professional Baseball
- Location: Shenzhen
- Ballpark: Zhongshan Baseball Stadium
- Established: November 2025; 3 months ago
- Colors: Blue, light blue and white
- Manager: Ray Chang
- Website: Official website

The Shenzhen Bluesox (Chinese: 深圳蓝袜; pinyin: Shēnzhèn Lánwà) are a professional baseball team based in Shenzhen, China. The team was established in 2025 as a founding franchise for Chinese Professional Baseball (CPB) and is a partner of the MLB China Development Center, a youth baseball training and development program, for the CPB Spring League.

== History ==
The establishment of the Shenzhen Bluesox was announced during the CPB's first draft in November 2025. Ray Chang, a Chinese-American former infielder in Minor League Baseball and the Chinese national team, was selected as the team's manager and head coach.

The Bluesox claimed the first victory of the league, beating the Fuzhou Sea Knights 8–1, in CPB's inaugural game on January 1, 2026. The team also won the league's first Spring League championship series, beating the Shanghai Dragons 2–1.

== Roster ==
Shenzhen Bluesox roster
Active roster		Coaches
Pitchers: 26 (Venezuela) José Acuña; 5 (Panama) Enrique Burgos; 88 (China) Cao Zhengqing; 37 (Taiwan) Chang Yu-cheng; 48 (United States) Derrick Cherry; 92 (China) Feng Jiacheng; 47 (China) He Xin; 10 (Canada) Kade Kozak; 28 (China) Liu Yuan; 66 (China) Luo Beixing; 12 (United States) David Reckers; 60 (China) Song Jiaqi; 97 (Taiwan) Wang Peng-fei; 77 (China) Wei Ruixin; 76 (China) Wei Jinjun; 52 (China) Zhang Weixing	Catchers: 11 (United States) Jaxx Groshans; 96 (China) Liu Wenjie; 34 (China) Wu Junhao; Infielders: 6 (United States) Marcus Chiu; 88 (China) Duojie Gengzhi; 2 (United States) Dante Leach; 57 (China) Wang Shuaizu; 80 (China) Wang Yang; 14 (China) Wu Qirui; 3 (China) Wu Zhengjun; Outfielders: 8 (United States) Samuel Benjamin; 22 (China) Lu Yi; 72 (China) Peng Ziyan; 7 (China) Shi Hongfei; 24 (United States) Landon Wallace	Manager: 21 (United States) Ray Chang; Coaches: 89 (China) Gao Yaxin; 70 (Japan) Nao Kozawa; 80 (China) Wang Yang
Roster updated on January 26, 2026
