= Beijing Loongs =

Professional baseball team based in Beijing, China

- 北京正大龙

Information
- League: Chinese Professional Baseball
- Location: Beijing
- Established: November 2025; 8 months ago
- Former name: Shanghai Dragons (2025–2026)
- President: Zhang Xiaotian
- Manager: Dae-sung Koo
- Website: Official website

The Beijing Loongs (Chinese: 北京正大龙; pinyin: Běijīng Zhēngdà Lóng), formerly the Shanghai Dragons (上海正大龙; Shànghǎi Zhēngdà Lóng), are a professional baseball team based in Beijing, China. The team was established in 2025 as a founding franchise for Chinese Professional Baseball (CPB).

== History ==
The establishment of the Shanghai Dragons was announced during the CPB's first draft in November 2025. Dae-sung Koo, a Korean former pitcher for the New York Mets, was selected as the team's manager and head coach. The team moved to Beijing due to a strategic business realignment before the 2026 Summer League.

=== Team name controversy ===
After the CPB's formation was announced, an Internet post depicting a "Shanghai Brothers" team circulated online. The team's logo was shown to include a yellow elephant wearing a baseball cap and holding a bat, nearly identical to the logo of the CTBC Brothers, a baseball team in Taiwan's Chinese Professional Baseball League. Reactions from Taiwanese netizens to the post were critical, with CTBC Bank, the owners of the CTBC Brothers, threatening legal action against CPB. CPB organizers denied claims that the league would include a team called the Shanghai Brothers, stating that the online post did not originate from the league.

== Roster ==
Shanghai Dragons roster
Active roster		Coaches
Pitchers: 20 (Taiwan) Chen Hong-zhi; 60 (Taiwan) Chen Guan-xun; 17 (China) Hai-Cheng Gong; 24 (China) Hua Dancairang; 74 (South Korea) Kang Hyungu; 19 (China) Li Jianye; 28 (China) Lin Yujun; 58 (China) Lin Ziqiang; 76 (China) Liu Weiyu; 21 (South Korea) Seon Seong Kwon; 11 (China) Tang Zhengjia; 91 (Taiwan) Teng Chia-an; 5 (China) Xiao Xuqian; 66 (Taiwan) Yang Hsiao-lung; 45 (Taiwan) Yao En-dou	Catchers: 10 (China) Jiang Bohan; 50 (South Korea) Lee Seong-won; 9 (China) Li Ning; 27 (Taiwan) Zhang Yu-cheng; Infielders: 1 (South Korea) Choi Jungmoon; 8 (China) Han Jie; 3 (Taiwan) Hao Jiaqi; 12 (South Korea) Kang Dongsu; 13 (Taiwan) Lin Yi-chuan; 35 (Taiwan) Yang Sheng'ao; 7 (China) Yang Jin; Outfielders: 89 (Taiwan) Pacidal Nikal; 69 (Taiwan) Yang Cheng-yu; 42 (China) Zhuo Wenyi; Designated hitters: 22 (South Korea) Kim Seok Hoon; 6 (South Korea) Yoo Sang-bin	Manager: 88 (South Korea) Dae-sung Koo; Coaches: 77 (South Korea) Choi Kyung Hwan; 63 (Taiwan) Hsu Kuo-lung; 99 (Taiwan) Yu Wen-ping
Roster updated on January 29, 2026
