= Chinese Professional Baseball =

Professional baseball league in China

- Most recent season or competition: 2026 Chinese Professional Baseball season
- Sport: Baseball
- Founded: 2025
- First season: 2026
- Organizing body: CoolBang Sports
- No. of teams: 6
- Country: China
- Most recent champion: Shanghai Orcas (2026 [Summer])
- Streaming partners: Douyin; Sina Weibo; Youku Sports
- Website: www.cpbofficial.com

Chinese Professional Baseball (CPB; Chinese: 中国棒球城市联赛; pinyin: Zhōngguó Bàngqiú Chéngshì Liánsài) is the top-tier professional baseball league in China. The league was formed in 2025 and began play on 1 January 2026, co-existing with the state-run China Baseball League as the main professional league in the nation. It is organized by Shanghai-based CoolBang Sports.

== History ==
The formation of the league was announced on 28 September 2025. The CPB's first draft was held on 26 November 2025, during which the five founding teams selected 57 players from Greater China and overseas. Prominent Taiwanese and international baseball figures were announced to have joined the league, including Lu Wen-sheng, Dae-sung Koo, and Ray Chang, who were selected as managers for the Fuzhou Sea Knights, Shanghai Dragons, and Shenzhen Bluesox respectively.

The league held its first overseas scout tryouts in Miryang, South Korea in May 2026, with roughly ten players entering into contract negotiations with CPB teams.

Two new teams were announced for the Summer League during the 2026 summer draft. The Shanghai Dragons moved to Beijing, becoming the Beijing Loongs. Shanghai's replacement team was announced to be the Shanghai Orcas under head coach Kim Yong-dal (Korean: 김용달; Hanja: 金龍達).

== Format ==
=== Inaugural season ===
The inaugural CPB season opened with the first game of the Spring League (立春联赛; Lìchūn Liánsài) on January 1, 2026. Four founding teams played a total of 30 regular-season games followed by a best-of-three championship series. Spring League games were primarily played at Zhongshan Baseball Park in Nanshan, Shenzhen, with some games played at the Zhongshan International Baseball and Softball Center ("Baseball City") in Zhongshan.

The Summer League (夏至联赛; Xiàzhì Liánsài) was held from August through September 2026, during which Changsha Want Want Happy and the Shanghai Orcas began play, with the former Shanghai Dragons moving to Beijing. The Xuhui West Bund Baseball Field in Shanghai was added as a primary venue. The league will consist of 45 regular-season games, with the top four teams advancing to the playoffs on September 21. A best-of-three championship series began on September 26.

=== Later seasons ===
According to the World Baseball Softball Confederation, the 2027 CPB season will largely follow the format of the 2026 season. The league is anticipated to move to a home-and-away schedule for the 2028 season and will retain the Spring League as a preseason spring training series, by which point the league hopes to have achieved "fully professional" state following more investment in player development.

== Teams ==
Home city locations of CPB teams

Team	Chinese name	Sponsor	Location	Joined
Beijing Loongs	北京正大龙	CP Group	Beijing	2026
Changsha Want Want	长沙旺旺	Want Want Group	Changsha, Hunan	2025
Fuzhou Sea Knights	福州海侠	Han Yuan Investment	Fuzhou, Fujian	2025
Shanghai Orcas	上海虎鲸	none announced	Shanghai	2025
Shenzhen Bluesox	深圳蓝袜	Shenzhen Bluesox Culture & Tourism	Shenzhen, Guangdong	2025
Xiamen Dolphins	厦门海豚	Xiamen Sports Properties	Xiamen, Fujian	2025

== Culture ==
The league assembled the eight-member CPB Girls cheerleading squad, consisting of famous cheerleaders from Taiwan and others selected from a draft in December 2025. The squad was later expanded to twelve members.

The league debuted a theme song titled "Arrogance", written by Taiwanese singer-songwriter AJ Chang, during a live performance at a Spring League championship series game on 30 January 2026. In addition, each team also has its own fight song.
