= Florida State Road 552 =

State highway in Florida, United States

State Road 552
- Curry Ford Road

Route information
- Maintained by FDOT
- Length: 2.639 mi (4.247 km)

Major junctions
- West end: SR 15 in Orlando
- SR 436 in Orlando
- East end: SR 551 near Azalea Park

Location
- Country: United States
- State: Florida
- Counties: Orange

Highway system
- Florida State Highway System; Interstate; US; State; Former; Pre‑1945; Toll; Scenic
← SR 551	→ SR 553

State Road 552 (SR 552), signed east–west, is part of Curry Ford Road in eastern Orlando.

== Route description ==
Curry Ford Road begins at South Ferncreek Avenue, as a straight west-to-east two-lane Orlando city street paved with brick. The brick surface ends just before the intersection with Francis Avenue, and later gains the designation of State Road 552 at the intersection with SR 15. SR 552 and Curry Ford Road continue their straight eastbound trajectory until the intersection with Bahia Avenue, when it curves to the southeast just before the intersection with SR 436.

SR 552's eastern terminus is at SR 551 near Azalea Park. However, Curry Ford Road continues to run relatively eastward towards Florida State Road 417 at Exit 30 and finally terminates at South Alafaya Trail in Alafaya.

== History ==
SR 552 was originally SR 526A; it was renumbered in the mid-1980s.

SR 526A at one time stretched west to Briercliff Drive; this had been part of SR 15 even earlier.

Curry Ford Road east of Goldenrod Road was once part of SR 425, but was probably never part of SR 526A.

== Major intersections ==
The entire route is in Orange County.

Location	mi	km	Destinations	Notes
Orlando	0.000	0.000	SR 15 (Conway Road) to Curry Ford Road west / SR 408	Continues west without designation
Orlando	1.262	2.031	SR 436 (Semoran Boulevard) to SR 408	
	2.639	4.247	SR 551 (Goldenrod Road) / Curry Ford Road east	Continues east without designation
1.000 mi = 1.609 km; 1.000 km = 0.621 mi
