= Florida State Road 15 =

Highway in Florida, US

State Road 15

Route information
- Maintained by FDOT
- Length: 340.594 mi (548.133 km)
- Existed: 1945–present

Major junctions
- South end: SR 80 / CR 880 in Belle Glade
- SR 50 in Orlando
- North end: US 1 / US 23 / US 301 / SR 4 / SR 15 at Georgia state line, northwest of Hilliard

Location
- Country: United States
- State: Florida
- Counties: Palm Beach, Martin, Okeechobee, Osceola, Orange, Seminole, Volusia, Putnam, Clay, Duval, Nassau

Highway system
- Florida State Highway System; Interstate; US; State; Former; Pre‑1945; Toll; Scenic
← SR 14	→ SR 15A

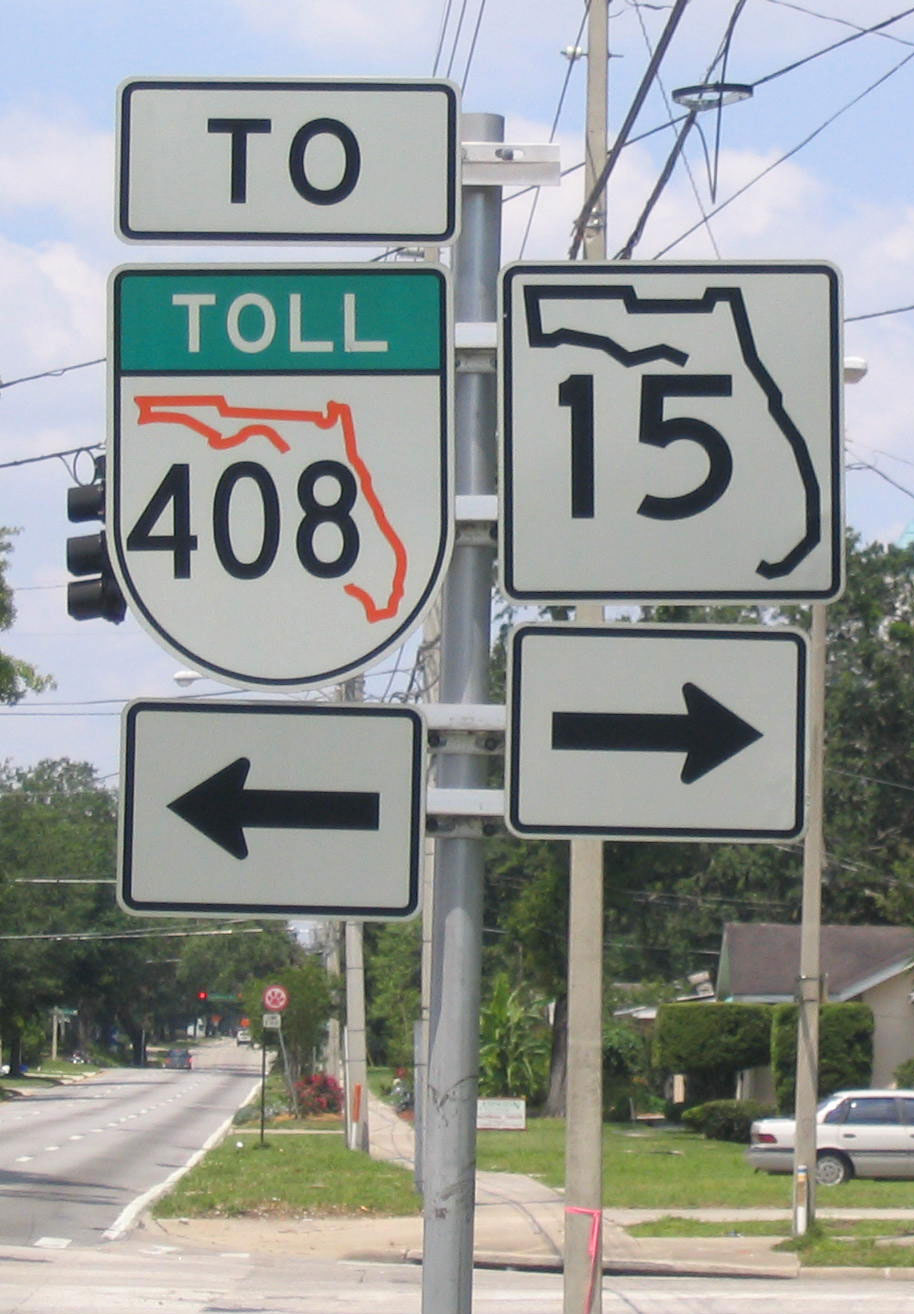
SR 15 north at SR 5098 in Orlando

State Road 15 (SR 15) is part of the Florida State Road System. This route is part of a multi two-state route 15 that begins at Florida and ends at Georgia at the North Carolina state line.

== Route description ==
SR 15 runs from SR 80/SR 880 at Belle Glade north along the east shore of Lake Okeechobee to Okeechobee. Then it runs north to SR 500 (US 192) at Holopaw, and northwest along SR 500 to Ashton (east of St. Cloud), where it ends.

County Road 15 in Osceola County and Orange County connects to the beginning of the next section, at SR 528 (the Bee Line Expressway) east of Orlando International Airport. From there, SR 15 travels north on Narcoossee Road, west on Hoffner Road, north on Conway Road through Conway, west on Lake Underhill Road, and west on South Street (northbound) and Anderson Street (southbound) on both sides of SR 408 to downtown Orlando. It then travels north on Mills Avenue and follows US 17 all the way to downtown Jacksonville. From there it follows Interstate 95 to the Martin Luther King Jr. Parkway, and then northwest into Georgia, as Georgia State Route 15.

SR 15 is practically unsigned, except in three places:

- from the south end to US 98 / US 441 north of Belle Glade
- SR 528 to SR 50 in downtown Orlando
- from U.S. 17/92 & FL 46 to I-4 & U.S. 17/92 Interchange (Co-signed with SR 500) in Sanford

The rest is signed as various U.S. Highways:

- US 441 from north of Belle Glade to the end of the first section, east of St. Cloud
- US 17 from Orlando to Jacksonville (With the exception of Sanford between U.S. 17/92 & FL 46 to I-4 & U.S. 17/92 Interchange)
- US 1 / US 23 from Jacksonville to Georgia
- US 301 from Callahan to Georgia (co-signed with US 1 and US 23)

== History ==
Prior to the 1945 renumbering, the route that became SR 15 had the following numbers:

- SR 143 from Belle Glade to Canal Point
- SR 194 from Canal Point to south of Okeechobee
- SR 29 from south of Okeechobee to Orlando
- SR 24 from Holopaw to Ashton
- SR 3A in downtown Orlando
- SR 3 from Orlando to south of Jacksonville, Florida
- SR 21 north of downtown DeLand
- SR 28 from San Mateo to Palatka
- SR 14 from East Palatka to Palatka
- SR 48 in Green Cove Springs
- SR 363 from south of Jacksonville to Jacksonville
- SR 3 in downtown Jacksonville
- SR 4 from Jacksonville, Florida to Georgia

SR 15 was defined in the 1945 renumbering as:

- Extending from SR 80 in Belle Glade in Palm Beach County in a general Northwesterly direction along Lake Okeechobee via Pahokee to Okeechobee then Northwesterly to a junction with SR 500 at Holopaw and along SR 500 to Ashton, then continuing Northwesterly to a junction with SR 600 in Orlando and along SR 600 to an intersection with SR 46 at 25th St. in Sanford, then along SR 600 and SR 46 to First St. then along SR 600 across St. Johns River to an intersection with SR 40 and SR 44 in DeLand, then along SR 600 and SR 40 to a point North of DeLand and along SR 40 to Barberville, then Northwesterly via Pierson, Crescent City and Satsuma to a junction with SR 20 and SR 100 at San Mateo, then along SR 20 and SR 100 via East Palatka to an intersection of SR 20 and SR 100 at Reid St. and 7th St. in Palatka, then along SR 100 to an intersection of SR 100 and SR 15 on Madison St. near the NW City Limits of Palatka, then Northwesterly to SR 16 in Green Cove Springs and along SR 16 to Orange Ave., then in a Northwesterly direction via Orange Park, Jacksonville, and Callahan to the St. Mary's River at the Georgia State Line.
- Also proposed route running North and Northwest from junction with SR 500 at Holopaw to a point near the Orange County and Osceola County Line on SR 15.
- Also from a point on SR 15 and SR 600 North of Longwood in Seminole County in a Northerly direction to intersection with SR 15 and SR 600 just South of St. Johns River at the Volusia County and Seminole County Line.
- Also a proposed route from a point on SR 15 North of Satsuma, North to intersection with SR 15 and SR 100 in Palatka.

Neither proposed route was built. The alternate route in Seminole County was going to be a bypass of Sanford, but construction of SR 400 (Interstate 4) relegated it to a minor road, and it became CR 15 in the 1980s.

The main route has stayed mostly the same. Here are the places where the route now differs:

- The south end of SR 15 has stayed the same, but SR 80 has moved to the north, and thus the first three miles (5 km) of SR 15 is also SR 80.
- SR 15 is now CR 15 in Osceola County and Orange County from SR 500 in Ashton to SR 528 east of Orlando International Airport.
- SR 15 originally went from Conway to Orlando along Conway Road, but then turned west at Curry Ford Road and used Briercliff Drive, Delaney Avenue, and Gore Street to reach SR 527. The part of the old alignment on Curry Ford Road became part of SR 526A when SR 15 was moved.
- Until around 1975, when the Mills Avenue Extension was built, SR 15 continued west from Mills Avenue along what is now SR 5098, and then went north on SR 527 through downtown Orlando, returning to the current route via SR 50.
- When the 20th Street Expressway was built in Jacksonville, SR 15 was rerouted onto it; the old route is now SR 139 (and was first given the number SR 15A).

== Major intersections ==
County	Location	mi	km	Destinations	Notes
Palm Beach	Belle Glade	0.000	0.000	CR 880 east (Dr. Martin Luther King Jr. Boulevard) SR 80 west (South Main Street)	south end of SR 80 overlap
Palm Beach	Belle Glade	0.242	0.389	East Canal Street South (SR 717 east)	south end of SR 717 overlap
Palm Beach	Belle Glade	0.290	0.467	SR 717 west (West Canal Street North)	north end of SR 717 overlap
Palm Beach		3.010	4.844	US 98 east / US 441 south / SR 80 east / SR 812 west (Hooker Highway / truck route) – Pahokee, Canal Point, West Palm Beach	north end of SR 80 overlap; south end of US 98 / US 441 overlap
see US 441 (mile 93.270-218.622)
Osceola	St. Cloud	128.362	206.579	US 192 west / US 441 north (SR 500 north) / Hickory Tree Road (CR 534)	north end of US 192 / US 441 overlap; north end of state maintenance (south end of CR 15)
Osceola–Orange county line	Orlando	135.759	218.483	Boggy Creek Road (CR 530 west) – Kissimmee	
Orange	Orlando	139.6	224.7	SR 417 – Orlando, Sanford, Tampa, Airport	SR 417 exit 22
Orange	Orlando	143.342	230.687	SR 528 to I-4 – Cocoa, Kennedy Space Center, International Airport	SR 528 exit 13; north end of CR 15; south (signed) end of SR 15
Orange	Orlando	144.776	232.994	Lee Vista Boulevard	south end of state maintenance
Orange	Orlando	145.950	234.884	SR 551 (Goldenrod Road)	
Orange	Orlando	147.337	237.116	SR 436 (Semoran Boulevard)	
Orange	Belle Isle	148.588	239.129	CR 506 (Conway Road south / Hoffner Road west)	
Orange	Orlando	151.610	243.993	SR 552 east (Curry Ford Road)	
Orange	Orlando	152.522	245.460	SR 408 west / CR 526 east (Lake Underhill Road)	SR 408 exit 13
Orange	Orlando	153.367	246.820	SR 408 east	SR 408 exit 12B
Orange	Orlando	153.516	247.060	Crystal Lake Drive – Orlando Executive Airport	former SR 526 west
Orange	Orlando	154.017	247.866	SR 408 west	SR 408 exit 12A
Orange	Orlando	154.774	249.085	SR 408 east / Mills Avenue south / South Street west – Titusville	SR 408 exit 11B; former SR 5098 west
Orange	Orlando	155.369	250.042	SR 526 (Robinson Street) to SR 50 west	
Orange	Orlando	155.873	250.853	US 17 south / US 92 west / SR 50 (Colonial Drive / SR 600 west) to I-4	no left turn northbound; south end of US 17 / US 92 / SR 600 overlap
see US 17 (mile 138.894-285.5), I-95 (mile 351.186-353.929)
Duval	Jacksonville	303.90	489.08	I-95 north (SR 9 north / SR 115 north) / US 1 south (M.L. King Jr. Parkway / SR 115 south) – International Airport, Savannah	north end of I-95 / SR 9 overlap; south end of US 1 overlap; SR 15 follows exit 354B from I-95
see US 1 (mile 508.57-545.03)
Nassau	Boulogne	340.594	548.133	US 1 north / US 23 north / US 301 north / SR 4 north / SR 15 north – Folkston, Nahunta, Waycross	Continuation to Georgia at the St. Marys River bridge
1.000 mi = 1.609 km; 1.000 km = 0.621 mi: Concurrency terminus; Route transition
