= 320th Special Tactics Squadron =

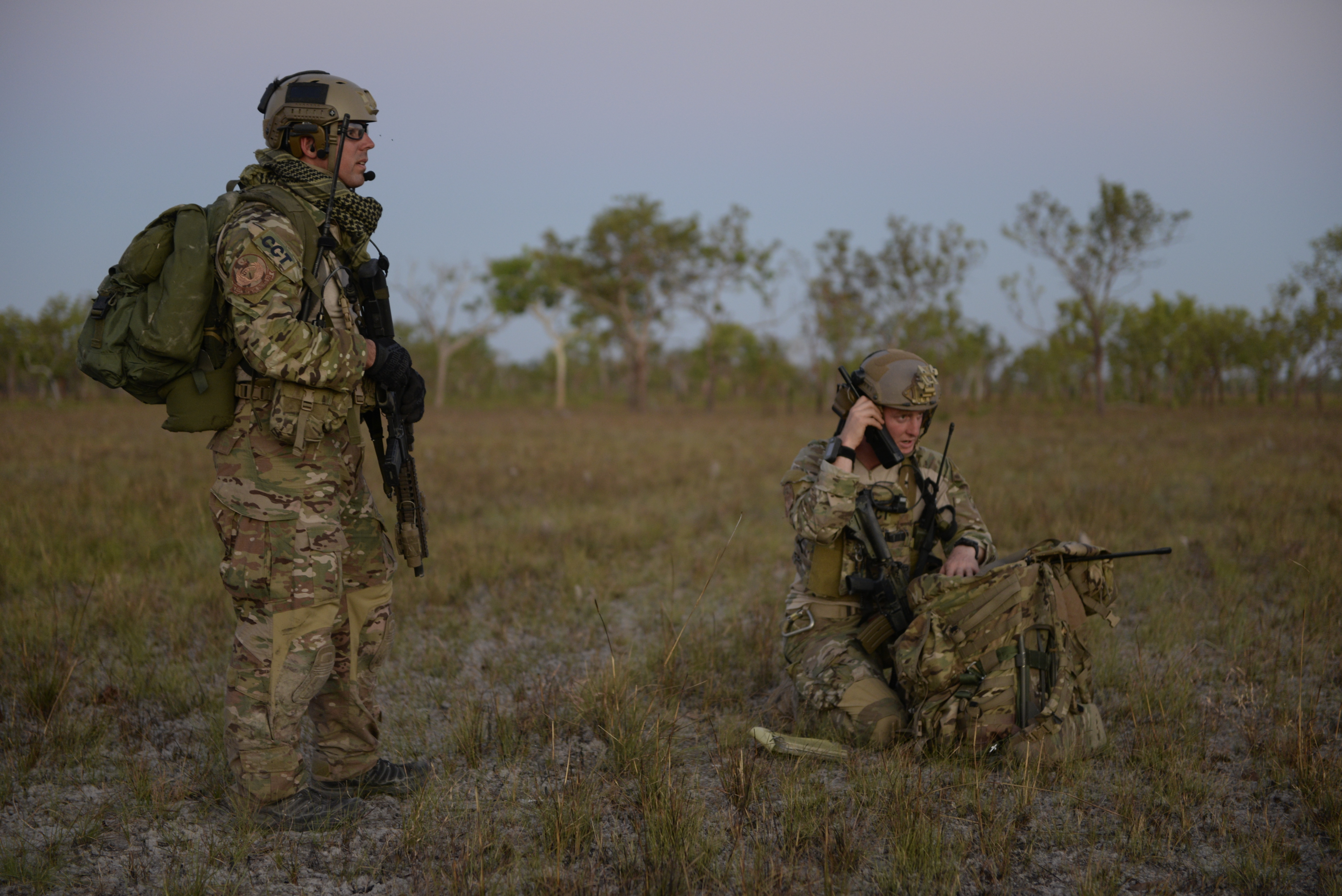
- Squadron personnel training for personnel recovery
- Active: 1943–1945; 1992–present
- Country: United States
- Branch: United States Air Force
- Type: Special Operations Force
- Role: Special Operations
- Part of: Air Force Special Operations Command; 353rd Special Operations Group
- Garrison/HQ: Kadena Air Base
- Engagements: World War II; War in Afghanistan
- Decorations: Air Force Outstanding Unit Award with Combat "V" Device; Air Force Outstanding Unit Award; Philippine Presidential Unit Citation

Insignia
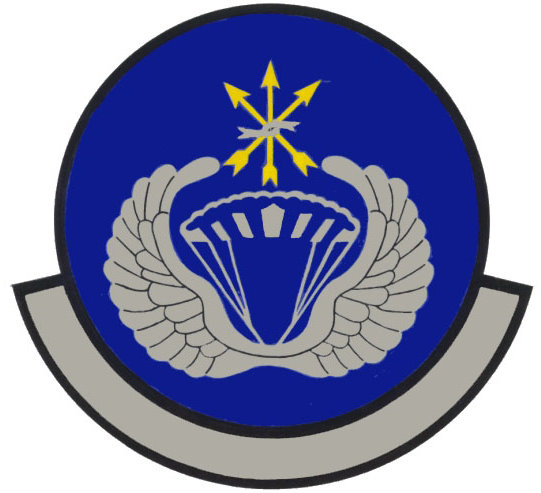
- 320th Special Tactics Squadron emblem (approved 9 December 1994)

The 320th Special Tactics Squadron (320th STS) is a Special Tactics unit of the United States Air Force Special Operations Command, based at Kadena Air Base.

The 320th was originally constituted in 1943 during World War II as an aircraft warning unit, the 320th Fighter Control Squadron. The squadron was sent to the Pacific at the end of 1943 and served there until its inactivation and disbandment after the end of the war. It was reconstituted and reactivated in 1992 at Kadena as the 320th Special Tactics Squadron. Initially with the 720th Special Tactics Group, it was soon transferred to the 353rd Special Operations Group.

== History ==
=== World War II ===
The 320th STS was originally constituted as the 320th Fighter Control Squadron, an aircraft warning unit, during World War II on 30 March 1943. It was activated on 1 April, part of the Army Air Forces School of Applied Tactics at Orlando Army Air Base. After completing air defense training, it became part of the Orlando Fighter Wing on 1 November. Between 20 November and 11 December, the 320th staged at Camp Stoneman, then was shipped to Guadalcanal, where it arrived on 30 December, becoming part of XIII Fighter Command. Between 24 July and 14 November 1944, the squadron was attached to the 13th Air Warning Group (Provisional). On 30 September, it was moved forward to Toem, and on 15 December the 320th relocated to Wakde. The squadron relocated to Biak on 11 February 1945, then to Mindoro on 22 February. On 1 March, it moved to Puerto Princesa, and was under the 85th Fighter Wing's operational control between 1 April and 1 June. The 320th was transferred to the 85th Fighter Wing on 15 June, but was under the operational control of the Thirteenth Air Force until 14 July. In October it was transferred to XIII Fighter Command, and on 29 October moved to Luzon. The squadron became part of XIII Bomber Command on 2 November and left Luzon for Vancouver Barracks on 30 November. After arriving at Vancouver Barracks on 14 December, it was inactivated on 18 December. The 320th was disbanded on 8 October 1948.

=== Special Tactics Squadron ===
The squadron was reconstituted and redesignated as the 320th Special Tactics Squadron on 20 February 1992, and activated at Kadena Air Base with the 720th Special Tactics Group on 31 March. The 320th included Combat Controllers, Pararescuemen, Combat Weathermen, and Survival, Evasion, Resistance and Escape specialists. On 1 January 1993, it was transferred to the 353d Special Operations Group.

During Operation Unified Assistance, the relief effort after the 26 December 2004 Indian Ocean earthquake and tsunami, the squadron's combat controllers surveyed airfields for the reception of humanitarian relief. 320th STS personnel deployed alongside United States Army Special Forces to the War in Afghanistan. On 28 February 2006, squadron Master Sergeant David Beals' team was ambushed during a convoy operation, trapping the entire team in the insurgent kill zone. Beals was credited with saving the lives of the entire team by repulsing the attack with his Humvee's M240 machine gun and 40mm grenades from his M203 grenade launcher, and was awarded the Bronze Star Medal with "V" device. On 26 September 2008, squadron personnel cooperated with the 1st Special Operations Squadron and 31st Rescue Squadron to rescue two crewmen injured in a crane accident aboard container ship Occam's Razor. A joint team of pararescuemen and combat controllers landed on the vessel from an MC-130H Combat Talon II and evacuated the men to a hospital on Guam. Following the 2011 Tōhoku earthquake and tsunami, in Operation Tomodachi, the relief effort, pararescuemen from the 320th flew numerous search and rescue missions. On 28 June 2018 a team from the 320th assisted in the rescue of the trapped boys soccer team in the Tham Luang Cave.

== Lineage ==
- Constituted as 320th Fighter Control Squadron on 30 March 1943

Activated on 1 April 1943
Inactivated on 18 December 1945
Disbanded on 8 October 1948

- Reconstituted and redesignated 320th Special Tactics Squadron on 20 February 1992

Activated on 31 March 1992

=== Assignments ===
- Army Air Forces School of Applied Tactics, 1 April 1943
- Orlando Fighter Wing, 1 November 1943
- XIII Fighter Command, 30 December 1943 (attached to 13th Air Warning Group (Provisional), 24 July–14 November 1944; under operational control of 85th Fighter Wing, 1 April–1 June 1945)
- 85th Fighter Wing, 15 June 1945 (under operational control of Thirteenth Air Force, 15 June–14 July 1945)
- XIII Fighter Command, October 1945
- XIII Bomber Command, 2 November 1945
- Unknown, 30 November–18 December 1945
- 720th Special Tactics Group, 31 March 1992
- 353d Special Operations Group, 1 January 1993–present

=== Stations ===
- Orlando Army Air Base, 1 April 1943
- Camp Stoneman, 20 November–11 December 1943
- Guadalcanal, 30 December 1943
- Toem, New Guinea, 30 September 1944
- Wakde, 15 December 1944
- Biak, 11 February 1945
- Mindoro, 22 February 1945
- Puerto Princesa, 1 March 1945
- Luzon, 29 October–30 November 1945
- Vancouver Barracks, 14–18 December 1945
- Kadena Air Base, 31 March 1992–present

=== Awards and campaigns ===
Award streamer	Award	Dates	Notes
	Air Force Outstanding Unit Award w/Combat "V" Device	2 September 2004 – 1 September 2006	320th Special Tactics Squadron
	Air Force Outstanding Unit Award w/Combat "V" Device	1 October 2006 – 30 September 2008	320th Special Tactics Squadron
	Air Force Outstanding Unit Award	1 June 1993 – 31 May 1995	320th Special Tactics Squadron
	Air Force Outstanding Unit Award	1 September 1995 – 31 August 1997	320th Special Tactics Squadron
	Air Force Outstanding Unit Award	16 October 1998 – 31 May 2000	320th Special Tactics Squadron
	Air Force Outstanding Unit Award	13 October 2000 – 1 September 2002	320th Special Tactics Squadron
	Air Force Outstanding Unit Award	2 September 2002 – 1 September 2004	320th Special Tactics Squadron
	Air Force Outstanding Unit Award	1 August – 30 September 2010	320th Special Tactics Squadron
	Philippine Presidential Unit Citation	17 October 1944 – 4 July 1945	320th Fighter Control Squadron
	Philippine Presidential Unit Citation	31 January – 31 July 2002	320th Special Tactics Squadron

Campaign Streamer	Campaign	Dates	Notes
	New Guinea	24 January 1943 – 31 December 1944	320th Fighter Control Squadron
	Luzon	15 December 1944 – 4 July 1945	320th Fighter Control Squadron
	Southern Philippines	27 February 1945 – 4 July 1945	320th Fighter Control Squadron
