= 1999 Senior League World Series =

American youth baseball tournament

Tournament information
- Location: Kissimmee, Florida
- Dates: August 15–21, 1999

Final positions
- Champions: Conway, Florida
- Runner-up: Maracaibo, Venezuela

The 1999 Senior League World Series took place from August 15–21 in Kissimmee, Florida, United States. Host Conway, Florida defeated Maracaibo, Venezuela in the championship game.

== Teams ==
United States	International
(Florida) Conway, Florida; District 3 Host	Surrey, British Columbia; Whalley; Canada
(Illinois) Chicago, Illinois; Jackie Robinson; Central	Brussels, Belgium Europe
Franklin, Pennsylvania East	(Guam) Hagåtña, Guam; Central; Far East
(North Carolina) Mint Hill, North Carolina South	Maracaibo, Venezuela Latin America
(California) Westminster, California; Westminster; West	

== Results ==
=== Winner's Bracket ===
Opening Game
—	Florida	10
—	Canada	2

—
1–0	Florida	12
—	North Carolina	4
—	Venezuela	5
—	California	4
—	Pennsylvania	1
—	Illinois	9
—	Belgium	1
—	Guam	6

—
2–0	Florida	3
1–0	Venezuela	2
1–0	Illinois	7
1–0	Guam	12

Bracket Final
3–0	Florida	9
2–0	Guam	5

=== Loser's Bracket ===
—
0–1	Belgium	2
0–1	California	4
0–1	Pennsylvania	2
0–1	Canada	10

—
0–1	North Carolina	0
1–1	Canada	14
1–1	Illinois	4
1–1	California	6

—
1–1	Venezuela	2
2–1	Canada	0
2–1	Guam	0
2–1	California	12

Bracket Final
2–1	Venezuela	4
3–1	California	2

=== Placement Bracket ===
—
0–2	Belgium	2
0–2	Pennsylvania	12

—
0–2	North Carolina
1–2	Pennsylvania
2–2	Canada
1–2	Illinois

—
2–2	Guam
–2
3–2	California
–2

Third Place Game
–2
–2

=== Elimination Round ===
Semifinals
3–0	Florida	9
2–0	Guam	5
2–1	Venezuela	4
3–1	California	2

World Championship
4–0	Florida	10
3–1	Venezuela	2
Third Place Game
–2
–2

1999 Senior League World Series Champions
District 3
Conway, Florida

== Notable players ==
- Zack Greinke (Conway, Florida) - MLB Cy Young Award winning pitcher
- Chris Gutierrez (baseball) (Orlando, Florida) - Senior League World Series in 1999
