= 1998 Senior League World Series =

American youth baseball tournament

Tournament information
- Location: Kissimmee, Florida
- Dates: August 16–22, 1998

Final positions
- Champions: Diamond Bar, California
- Runner-up: Conway, Florida

The 1998 Senior League World Series took place from August 16–22 in Kissimmee, Florida, United States. Diamond Bar, California defeated host Conway, Florida in the championship game.

== Teams ==
United States	International
(Florida) Conway, Florida; District 3 Host	Surrey, British Columbia; Whalley; Canada
(Indiana) Fort Wayne, Indiana; St. Joes Central; Central	Brussels, Belgium Europe
Wilmington, Delaware; Brandywine; East	(Guam) Hagåtña, Guam; Central; Far East
(Florida) Seminole, Florida; Seminole; South	Betania, Panama; William R. Cook; Latin America
(California) Diamond Bar, California; Diamond Bar; West	

== Results ==
=== Winner's Bracket ===
Opening Game
—	(Florida) Host	21
—	Belgium	3

—
1–0	(Florida) Host (F/8)	10
—	Delaware	9
—	California	16
—	Canada	7
—	Guam	5
—	Florida	11
—	Indiana	3
—	Panama	10

—
2–0	(Florida) Host	3
1–0	California	4
1–0	Florida	3
1–0	Panama	1

Bracket Final
2–0	California	9
2–0	Florida	8

=== Loser's Bracket ===
—
0–1	Belgium	2
0–1	Guam	12
0–1	Canada	7
0–1	Indiana	10

—
0–1	Delaware	4
1–1	Indiana	2
1–1	Panama	6
1–1	Guam	5

—
2–1	(Florida) Host	3
1–1	Delaware	2
2–1	Florida	5
2–1	Panama	3

Bracket Final
3–1	(Florida) Host	11
3–1	Florida	0

=== Placement Bracket ===
—
0–2	Belgium	5
0–2	Canada	9

—
1–2	Indiana	0
1–2	Canada	11
1–2	Guam	13
1–2	Delaware	17

—
2–2	Panama	3
2–2	Canada	6
3–2	Florida	12
2–2	Delaware	4

Third-place game
3–2	Canada	2
4–2	Florida	3

=== Elimination Round ===
Semifinals
2–0	California	9
2–0	Florida	8
3–1	(Florida) Host	11
3–1	Florida	0

World championship
3–0	California	9
4–1	(Florida) Host	6
Third-place game
3–2	Canada	2
4–2	Florida	3

1998 Senior League World Series Champions
Diamond Bar LL
Diamond Bar, California

== Notable players ==
- Zack Greinke (Conway, Florida) - MLB pitcher

Jeffrey Miller, Diamond Bar Pitcher
