= Azalea Park, Florida =

Unincorporated area in Florida, US

- Census-designated place
- Location of Azalea Park in Orange County, Florida.
- Coordinates: 28°32′51″N 81°17′44″W
- Country: United States
- State: Florida
- County: Orange

Area
  - Total: 3.09 sq mi (8.01 km^{2})
  - Land: 3.05 sq mi (7.90 km^{2})
  - Water: 0.039 sq mi (0.10 km^{2})
- Elevation: 89 ft (27 m)

Population (2020)
  - Total: 14,141
  - Density: 4,635/sq mi (1,789.4/km^{2})
- Time zone: UTC-5 (Eastern (EST))
  - Summer (DST): UTC-4 (EDT)
- ZIP code: 32807
- Area codes: 407, 689
- FIPS code: 12-02850
- GNIS feature ID: 2402657

Azalea Park is a census-designated place (CDP) and an unincorporated area in Orange County, Florida, United States. The population was 14,141 at the 2020 census. It is part of the Orlando–Kissimmee–Sanford, Florida Metropolitan Statistical Area.

== Geography ==
According to the United States Census Bureau, the CDP has a total area of 8.4 km^{2} (3.2 sq mi), of which 8.3 km^{2} (3.2 sq mi) is land and 0.1 km^{2} (0.039 sq mi) (0.93%) is water.

It is bordered by Colonial Drive (State Road 50) to the north, Goldenrod Road (State Road 551) to the east, and Curry Ford Road (State Road 552) to the south. The western boundary varies: when south of Lake Underhill Road, the western boundary is Semoran Boulevard (State Road 436), but when north of Lake Underhill Road the western boundary is the Orlando Executive Airport (ORL) and Lake Barton.

== Demographics ==
Historical population
| Census | Pop. | Note | %± |
|---|---|---|---|
| 1970 | 7,367 | | — |
| 1980 | 8,301 | | 12.7% |
| 1990 | 8,926 | | 7.5% |
| 2000 | 11,073 | | 24.1% |
| 2010 | 12,556 | | 13.4% |
| 2020 | 14,141 | | 12.6% |

=== 2020 census ===
As of the 2020 census, Azalea Park had a population of 14,141. The median age was 34.9 years. 22.4% of residents were under the age of 18 and 12.4% of residents were 65 years of age or older. For every 100 females there were 95.9 males, and for every 100 females age 18 and over there were 93.9 males age 18 and over.

100.0% of residents lived in urban areas, while 0.0% lived in rural areas.

There were 4,957 households in Azalea Park, of which 33.3% had children under the age of 18 living in them. Of all households, 38.7% were married-couple households, 19.2% were households with a male householder and no spouse or partner present, and 30.9% were households with a female householder and no spouse or partner present. About 20.9% of all households were made up of individuals and 5.6% had someone living alone who was 65 years of age or older.

There were 5,329 housing units, of which 7.0% were vacant. The homeowner vacancy rate was 1.6% and the rental vacancy rate was 8.7%.

Racial composition as of the 2020 census
| Race | Number | Percent |
|---|---|---|
| White | 4,908 | 34.7% |
| Black or African American | 1,230 | 8.7% |
| American Indian and Alaska Native | 103 | 0.7% |
| Asian | 626 | 4.4% |
| Native Hawaiian and Other Pacific Islander | 22 | 0.2% |
| Some other race | 3,506 | 24.8% |
| Two or more races | 3,746 | 26.5% |
| Hispanic or Latino (of any race) | 9,188 | 65.0% |

=== 2000 census ===
As of the 2000 census, there were 11,073 people, 3,981 households, and 2,695 families residing in the CDP. The population density was 1,331.9 people/km^{2} (3,450 people/mi^{2}). There were 4,115 housing units at an average density of 495.0 units/km^{2} (1,282 units/mi^{2}). The racial makeup of the CDP was 70.23% White, 6.75% African American, 0.50% Native American, 3.60% Asian, 0.07% Pacific Islander, 14.55% from other races, and 4.30% from two or more races. Hispanic or Latino people of any race were 38.97% of the population.

Of all households, 33.8% had children under the age of 18 living with them, 45.1% were married couples living together, 16.3% had a female householder with no husband present, and 32.3% were non-families. 21.6% of all households were made up of individuals, and 5.8% had someone living alone who was 65 years of age or older. The average household size was 2.77 and the average family size was 3.26.

In the CDP, the population was spread out, with 25.8% under the age of 18, 13.5% from 18 to 24, 32.8% from 25 to 44, 17.6% from 45 to 64, and 10.3% who were 65 years of age or older. The median age was 31 years. For every 100 females, there were 97.2 males. For every 100 females age 18 and over, there were 94.4 males.

The median income for a household in the CDP was $32,841, and the median income for a family was $40,057. Males had a median income of $26,385 versus $21,445 for females. The per capita income for the CDP was $14,136. About 8.9% of families and 11.5% of the population were below the poverty line, including 12.6% of those under age 18 and 8.4% of those age 65 or over.

== Services ==
=== Government services ===
Azalea Park is served by the Orange County government. Police service includes the Orange County Sheriff's Office and the Florida Highway Patrol. Fire/EMS service is provided through Orange County Fire Rescue. Rural-Metro also provides EMS service in the area. The Florida Highway Patrol has its Orlando station just off of Semoran Boulevard (State Road 436) and Lake Underhill Road.

The Florida Highway Patrol, Florida Fish and Wildlife Conservation Commission, Orange County Fire Rescue have their communications centers in Azalea Park. Both Orange County and the city of Orlando have their Emergency Operations Centers in the area. The Florida Department of Transportation, has an office in Azalea Park in the same building with the Florida Highway Patrol. This office houses construction offices as well as the Orlando RTMC.

Azalea Park is served by the Greater Orlando Aviation Authority with two airports. Orlando International Airport (MCO) to the south and Orlando Executive Airport (ORL) to the immediate western boundary.

=== Hospitals ===
The primary hospital in the area is AdventHealth East Orlando, owned and operated by AdventHealth. Orlando Regional Medical Center is less than three miles away and has Central Florida's only Level 1 Trauma Center.

=== Schools ===
Schools within the neighborhood include Azalea Park Elementary School, Azalea Park Baptist School, Chickasaw Elementary School, Forsyth Woods Elementary School and Colonial High School. These schools have received average grades from the state in previous years.

Full Sail University is located just outside the physical boundaries.

Valencia College East is the closest public post-secondary institution to Azalea Park.

=== Taxes, politics/government, utilities ===
Property taxes in the area are set by the Orange County Property Appraiser. The 2010 mill rate was 4.4347. The sales tax was 6.5% and there was no state income tax.

It is located in Florida's 7th Congressional District and Florida's 9th Congressional District, currently served by Stephanie Murphy (D) and Darren Soto (D) respectively, in the United States House of Representatives. The state is served by Senators Marco Rubio (R) and Rick Scott (R).

The area is governed by Orange County, led by Orange County Board of County Commissioners, which is headed by Mayor Jerry Demings.

Utilities in the area are provided by Orlando Utilities Commission on the northwest side of the community (north of Lake Underhill Road and west of Forsyth Road. The areas south of Lake Underhill Road but north of Curry Ford Road, and north of Lake Underhill Road and east of Forsyth Road, are handled by Orange County Utilities (water and solid waste) and Florida Power & Light or Progress Energy Inc.
