= Florida State Road 408 =

Highway in Florida

State Road 408
- Spessard L. Holland East-West Expressway
- SR 408 highlighted in red

Route information
- Maintained by FTE and CFX
- Length: 22.107 mi (35.578 km)
- Existed: October 26, 1973–present

Major junctions
- West end: Florida's Turnpike in Gotha
- US 17 / US 92 / US 441 in Orlando; I-4 in Orlando; SR 417 near Union Park
- East end: SR 50 in Alafaya

Location
- Country: United States
- State: Florida
- Counties: Orange

Highway system
- Florida State Highway System; Interstate; US; State; Former; Pre‑1945; Toll; Scenic
← SR 407	→ SR 414

State Road 408 (SR 408), officially named the Spessard L. Holland East–West Expressway, is a controlled-access toll road running east–west through Orlando, Florida, United States. It is owned and operated by the Central Florida Expressway Authority (CFX), except for the westernmost mile (1.5 km), which is owned by Florida's Turnpike Enterprise as a connection to Florida's Turnpike. The road runs from Florida's Turnpike in Gotha, east through downtown Orlando, where it intersects with I-4, ending near SR 50 south of the University of Central Florida. The road is named for Spessard L. Holland.

A short connection to SR 417, originally part of SR 408, was a spur of SR 408, and is sometimes labeled State Road 4080. The spur has been removed and the interchange with SR 417 has been revamped. The right-of-way where SR 408 once ended at SR 50 west of SR 435 (Kirkman Road) was once called State Road 4081. This spur is now a drainage basin.

== Route description ==
SR 408 begins at Florida's Turnpike, heading east towards West Colonial Drive (SR 50) near Ocoee. After the interchange with Good Homes Road, the tollway passes through the Hiawassee barrier toll, the first of four mainline toll barriers. From there, SR 408 serpentines eastward through the neighborhoods of Orlo Vista and Pine Hills making major junctions with State Road 435 (Kirkman Road), passing through the Pine Hills barrier toll east of Pine Hills Road, State Road 423 (John Young Parkway), and U.S. Route 441 (Orange Blossom Trail), with Camping World Stadium (formerly the Citrus Bowl) being accessible from the Orange Blossom Trail exit. Motorists heading east enter the Orlando city limits at mile marker 8, where they are greeted with a view of the high-rise skyline of Central Orlando. The East–West Expressway passes through a major stack interchange with Interstate 4 in Downtown and proceeds eastward to the Conway Toll Plaza, followed by major junctions with State Road 436 (Semoran Boulevard), and State Road 417 (Central Florida Greeneway). The route continues through the Dean Road Toll Plaza and the exits to State Road 434 (Alafaya Trail) and State Road 50 (East Colonial Drive). The tollway's eastern terminus is Challenger Parkway near its intersection at Woodbury Road. Challenger Parkway continues on until Alafaya Trail as it cuts through the southern part of Central Florida Research Park.

SR 408 runs almost entirely parallel to State Road 50 throughout its entire route.

== Tolls ==
There are four mainline toll plazas on the tollway. Each of them have at least two express lanes dedicated to E-Pass/SunPass for electronic toll collection which do not require motorists to stop at a booth and lanes dedicated to cash collection. Excepting the Mills off ramp, which has only two lanes for exact change, the ramp toll plazas have both a lane dedicated to ETC and a lane dedicated to exact change only with no change provided.

The current toll rates took effect in July 2012.

== History ==
=== Initial segment ===
The Orlando-Orange County Expressway Authority had been formed in 1963 for the purpose of building the Bee Line Expressway. In early 1966, while that road was still under construction, Governor Haydon Burns asked the OOCEA to look into an east–west freeway across downtown Orlando to relieve traffic on State Road 50 (Colonial Drive). An engineering study recommended a western terminus at SR 50 west of State Road 435 (Kirkman Road) and an eastern terminus at SR 50 east of Goldenrod Road (State Road 15A). One alternate ran close to SR 50, while the other – which was chosen by June 1969 – ran further south. Bonds were sold in May 1971. In December of that year, the OOCEA voted to name it the Spessard Lindsay Holland East–West Expressway, in honor of Spessard Holland, who had just retired from representing Florida in the U.S. Senate. Groundbreaking was held just east of Semoran Boulevard on February 5, 1972.

The final design took SR 408 across Interstate 4 just south of Anderson Street. The interchange – a double trumpet – connected to I-4 south of Gore Street, and resulted in the closure of four of the six ramps at Gore Street, which had intersected I-4 with a six-ramp partial cloverleaf. (The loops were in the southwest and southeast quadrants.) To the east, SR 408 crossed Lake Underhill. East of Goldenrod Road, the decision was made in 1970 to temporarily include three at-grade intersections at Chickasaw Trail, Valencia College Lane and Millinocket Lane.

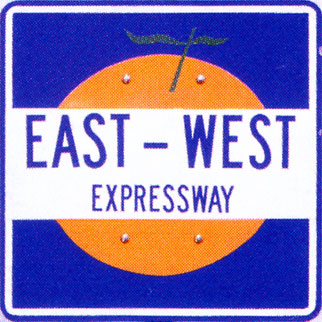
Former East–West Expressway shield, with an orange

The west half, from SR 50 to Mills Avenue, opened October 26, 1973. The rest was completed by December 11. The two barrier toll plazas – Holland West and Holland East – each charged 20 cents, while the ramp tolls – present at Orange Blossom Trail, Mills Avenue, Bumby Avenue, Conway Road and Semoran Boulevard, charged 10 cents. The Florida Department of Transportation took over operation and maintenance, giving revenues to the OOCEA. The final cost of the 13.3-mile (21.4 km) road was about $89 million.

Most tolls were doubled on January 1, 1987.

=== Eastern extension ===
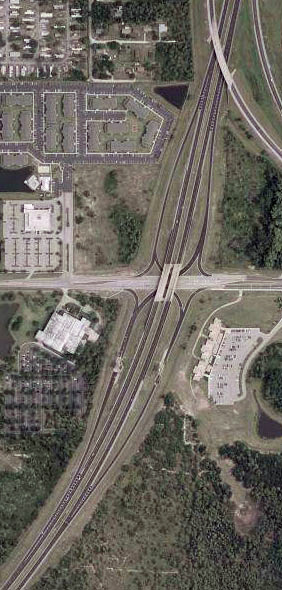
An aerial view of the former single-point urban interchange with Valencia College Lane/SR 4080.

Prior to the start of construction on the eastern extension, the Northeastern Beltway (State Road 417) was built north from the existing east end of the East–West Expressway at Colonial Drive. As part of this project, in 1987 and 1988, two ramps were added to the Goldenrod Road interchange to make it full, and the three at-grade intersections were removed – Chickasaw Trail became an overpass, Valencia College Lane became an interchange, and Millinockett Lane was simply cut. Ramp tolls were added at Valencia College Lane and SR 50, adding to the cost of traveling the original East–West once tolling on the new road began January 1, 1989.

By 1984, the alignment of the eastern extension of SR 408 had been chosen. The area was planned to be developed, and the OOCEA hoped to build the road before development made that impossible. Construction began in 1987, and the west piece, from existing SR 408 (redesignated SR 4080) to Rouse Road, opened May 12, 1989. The rest of the six-mile (10 km) road opened in June, with a total cost of $105 million. This project included a full interchange with the planned Southeastern Beltway (opened April 14, 1990), the Dean Road barrier toll, as well as a connection at the east end to the Central Florida Research Park. A wide median was left where the road curves north to end at SR 50 for further extension, but the land to the east has since been developed.

=== Western extension ===
A connection to Florida's Turnpike and the planned Western Beltway was studied in 1985. (The Beltway, which would have run where Clarke Road now is, was soon shifted west.) Construction on the 4.5-mile (7 km) extension began in mid-1989 and was completed on October 8, 1990, costing $102 million total. The former west end at SR 50 west of Kirkman Road was temporarily designated SR 4081 during construction, and became a retention pond. A fourth barrier toll – the Hiawassee Road plaza – was added to the road. The extension was designed to have a full interchange with the Turnpike, but originally only the north-pointing ramps were built. The full interchange with the Turnpike was completed in August 2006. A temporary ticket system booth was installed until the Turnpike switched to a coin system in 1991.

=== Later changes ===
Tolls were again raised July 1, 1990, to 75 cents at barrier tolls and 50 cents on ramps. After public backlash, an experiment began October 11, 1992, in which some of the changes were reverted. The Hiawassee Road and Dean Road barriers were dropped back to 50 cents, and ramp tolls at Hiawassee Road, Valencia College Lane, Dean Road and Rouse Road were cut to 25 cents. The OOCEA board voted on June 17, 1993, to make the changes permanent.

Due to confusion resulting from the four named toll roads in the Orlando area (East–West Expressway, Bee Line Expressway, Eastern Beltway and Seminole County Expressway), the OOCEA decided in 1992 to use the numbers that had already been designated by the Florida Department of Transportation (FDOT). The old orange symbol was replaced by the number 408 in the new toll road symbol, recently approved by FDOT. Signs were changed in 1993.

At some point in the late 1990s, the John Young Parkway (SR 423) interchange was completed; it had formerly only had ramps to and from the east.

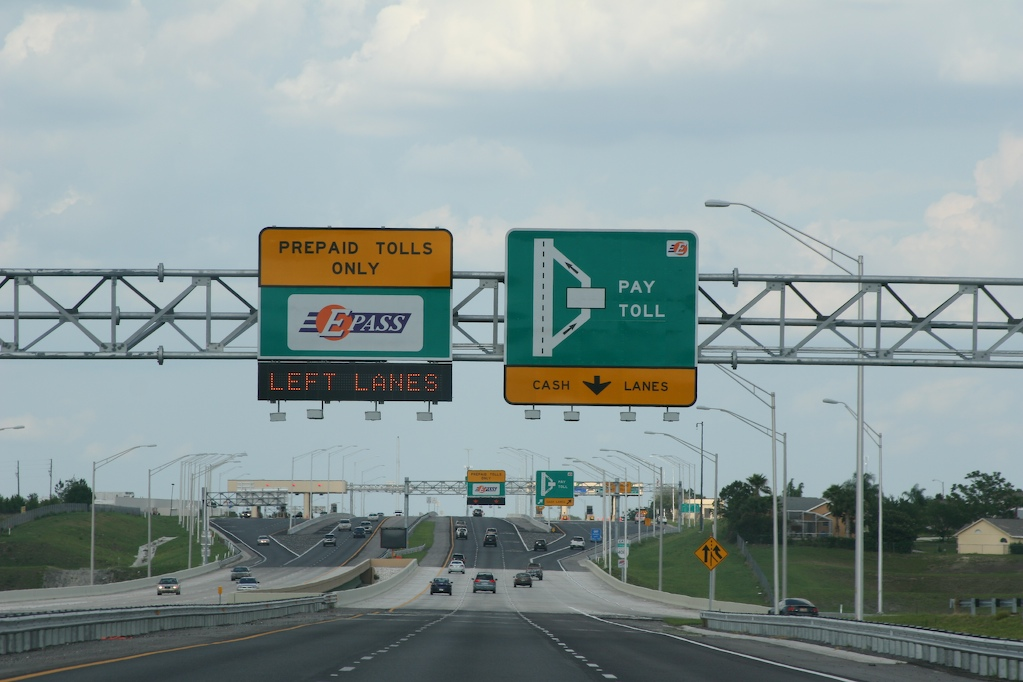
The rebuilt Hiawassee Road toll plaza with express E-Pass lanes

All the mainline toll plazas were reconstructed with express E-Pass lanes in the latter half of the 2000s. On November 10, 2006, the new Pine Hills Main Toll Plaza opened 2 miles (3.2 km) west as a replacement of the now demolished Holland West Toll Plaza. The new toll plaza features three express E-Pass lanes in both directions with open road tolling.

At the western end of the expressway a new set of ramps to Florida's Turnpike opened in August 2006. Previously it was only possible for westbound traffic to go northbound on the Turnpike. A new ramp allows traffic to also go southbound on the Turnpike. Likewise, previously only southbound Turnpike traffic could exit onto eastbound TOLL 408. A new ramp on the northbound Turnpike allows traffic to enter eastbound TOLL 408. New west facing ramps opened in March 2007 at Good Homes Road, joining pre-existing east facing ramps.

Starting in September 2003, a $600 million widening project occurred in the central and western part of the road. As part of the project, two through lanes were added along the entire length of the expressway from Hiawassee Road in the west to Oxalis Road (just east of the SR 436 interchange) in the east. The section from downtown Orlando to Hiawassee Road was completed in Spring 2007. The entire project was completed in June 2010.

In the summer of 2010, the Expressway Authority began the widening of SR 408 from Oxalis Avenue to Goldenrod Road as well as the widening of the SR 408 Chickasaw Trail Bridge. This project was completed in March 2012. In addition, the interchange with SR 417 was expanded. This resulted in the elimination of SR 4080 and the interchange with Valencia College Lane. Traffic to Valencia College was redirected to Chickasaw Trail and Dean Road.

On October 13, 2016, Central Florida Expressway board members approved to rename a portion of SR 408 after professional golfer Arnold Palmer. State Representative Mike Miller and State Senator David Simmons sponsored legislation for renaming the road, which was signed into law by Governor Rick Scott on June 14, 2017. The section of SR 408 between Kirkman Road and Clarke Road was renamed the Arnold Palmer Expressway on July 1, 2017.

A stack interchange with Interstate 4 near downtown Orlando replaced the original double-trumpet interchange in recent years. The first construction phase began in April 2006 and was completed in November 2008. Due to a lack of funds, the rest of the interchange project was ultimately postponed until the I-4 Ultimate project. Following the first phase, the ramp that originally handled all traffic merging from I-4 only handled traffic from I-4 eastbound, which left abandoned lanes. A ramp stub was constructed in advance of the completion the conversion to stack interchange on SR 408 westbound. The Florida Department of Transportation was responsible for this project. On May 19, 2020, Governor Ron DeSantis formally opened the reconstructed SR 408 ramps with I-4. This was completed as part of the acceleration of I-4 Ultimate improvement project as part of the lack of traffic in Florida due to stay-at-home orders that were implemented within the state of Florida during the COVID-19 pandemic.

== Future ==
=== Eastern Extensions ===
The OOCEA 2025 Master Plan (2000) suggested extending SR 408 further east toward the west end of SR 520. In the OOCEA 2030 Master Plan, this proposed extension was further extended to I-95 in Brevard County.

So far, the SR 408 Eastern Extension project has been put on hold. The alternative solution, dubbed the Colonial Parkway has been shelved by Florida's Turnpike Enterprise (FTE) so as of now the extension is still sitting on hold.

Talks of extending SR 408 south past SR 528, Nova Road, down to US 192, named the Northeast Connector Expressway Extension (NECEE), a CF&M study done by the Central Florida Expressway Authority. This further extension would take SR 408 from the Challenger Parkway Interchange with SR 50/East Colonial Drive over to the proposed terminus at SR 50 near the SR 50/SR 520 then down southward to US 192. But the Southward extensions won't become a reality until after 2040 since these are part of a development plan dubbed the North Ranch Master Plan in Osceola County

=== Western Improvements ===
Florida's Turnpike Enterprise is currently planning to widen Florida's Turnpike from 8 to 12 lanes from SR 408 in Gotha to SR 50/West Colonial Drive near Oakland and Clermont which includes interchange improvements at Florida's Turnpike/SR 429(Daniel Webster Western Beltway) and SR 408 by constructing an 8 lane (4 lanes in both directions) Collector/Distributor System, connecting SR 408 with SR 429 without having to take Florida's Turnpike mainline, which helps drastically decrease the congestion and weaving between the two expressways on the Turnpike.

== Exit list ==
The entire route is in Orange County.

Location	mi	km	Exit	Destinations	Notes
Gotha	0.000	0.000		Florida's Turnpike to SR 429 – Ocala, Miami	Directional T interchange; exit 265 on Florida's Turnpike (SR 91)
	0.898	1.445	1	SR 50 (West Colonial Drive)	Half-Y interchange; westbound exit and eastbound entrance; access to Health Central and West Oaks Mall; transition from FTE to CFX maintenance
	1.552	2.498	2	Good Homes Road	Trumpet/partial cloverleaf interchange; tolled eastbound exit and westbound entrance
	2.3	3.7	Hiawassee Mainline Toll Plaza		
Orlo Vista	3.335	5.367	4	Hiawassee Road	Diamond interchange; tolled westbound exit and eastbound entrance
Orlo Vista	4.520	7.274	5	SR 435 (Kirkman Road)	Diamond interchange
	5.112	8.227	6	CR 431 (Pine Hills Road)	Half diamond interchange; westbound exit and eastbound entrance
	5.5	8.9	Pine Hills Mainline Toll Plaza		
Orlando	6.191	9.963	7	CR 526 (Old Winter Garden Road)	Half diamond interchange; tolled westbound exit and eastbound entrance
Orlando	7.272	11.703	8A	SR 423 (John Young Parkway)	Diamond interchange; tolled westbound exit and eastbound entrance
Orlando	7.936	12.772	8B	Tampa Avenue	Half diamond interchange; eastbound exit and westbound entrance; Access to Camping World Stadium and Tinker Field
Orlando	8.447	13.594	9	US 17 / US 92 / US 441 (Orange Blossom Trail)	Diamond interchange; tolled westbound exit and eastbound entrance; road is unsigned SR 500 / SR 600; Access to Camping World Stadium and Tinker Field
Orlando	9.017	14.511	10A	I-4 – Tampa, Daytona Beach	Four-level cloverstack interchange; signed as exit 10 westbound; exit 82 on I-4 (SR 400)
Orlando	9.629	15.496	10B	SR 527 (Orange Avenue) – Downtown Orlando	Eastbound exit and westbound entrance; former exit 10C; to Orlando Regional Medical Center
Orlando	9.629	15.496	11A	Rosalind Avenue (SR 527)	Half diamond interchange; westbound exit and eastbound entrance; to Orlando Regional Medical Center
Orlando	10.292	16.563	11B	Mills Avenue (SR 15)	Three-quarter diamond interchange; tolled eastbound exit; no westbound entrance
Orlando	11.21	18.04	12A	Bumby Avenue (via SR 15 south)	Half diamond interchange; tolled eastbound exit and westbound entrance
Orlando	11.71	18.85	12B	Crystal Lake Drive (via SR 15 north)	Half diamond interchange; westbound exit and eastbound entrance; former SR 526; Access to Orlando Executive Airport and Orlando Fashion Square
Orlando	11.917– 12.239	19.179– 19.697	Lake Underhill bridge		
Orlando	12.484	20.091	13	SR 15 (South Conway Road)	Half-Y interchange; tolled eastbound exit and westbound entrance
Orlando	13.1	21.1	Conway East-West Mainline Toll Plaza		
Orlando–Azalea Park line	13.750	22.128	14	SR 436 (Semoran Boulevard) / Andes Avenue – Orlando International Airport	Hybrid half diamond and partial cloverleaf interchange; Tolled interchange except westbound entrance
Azalea Park	15.264	24.565	16	SR 551 (Goldenrod Road)	Diamond interchange; Access to AdventHealth East Orlando
	15.81	25.44	17	Chickasaw Trail to Valencia College Lane	Half diamond interchange; eastbound exit and westbound entrance
	17.029	27.406	18	SR 417 – Orlando International Airport, Sanford	Cloverstack interchange; exit 33 on SR 417
Union Park–Alafaya line	17.856	28.736	19	CR 425 (Dean Road)	Diamond interchange; tolled eastbound exit and westbound entrance; former SR 425
Union Park–Alafaya line	18.4	29.6	Dean Mainline Toll Plaza		
Union Park–Alafaya line	19.126	30.780	20	Rouse Road	Trumpet/partial cloverleaf interchange; tolled westbound exit and eastbound entrance
Alafaya	20.327	32.713	21	Alafaya Trail	Half diamond interchange; eastbound exit and westbound entrance; To Waterford Lakes Town Center
Alafaya	21.958	35.338	23	SR 50 (East Colonial Drive)	Partial cloverleaf interchange; eastbound exit and westbound entrance; end of CFX maintenance
University	22.107	35.578		Challenger Parkway	Continuation east to Central Florida Research Park
1.000 mi = 1.609 km; 1.000 km = 0.621 mi: Electronic toll collection; Incomplete access

== Challenger Parkway ==
=== Route description ===
Challenger Parkway (local/non-tolled) begins right after SR 408 ends at an interchange with SR 50. It then intersects with Woodbury Road then turns westward, intersecting with 2 streets at traffic lights, Ingenuity Drive and Challenger Tech Court then ends at SR 434 (Alafaya Trail) at a traffic light.

== See also ==
- Central Florida Expressway Authority
