= West Oaks Mall =

West Oaks Mall may refer to:

- West Oaks Mall (Houston), a shopping mall in Houston, Texas, United States
- West Oaks Mall (Orlando), a shopping mall in Ocoee, Florida, United States
