= Florida State Road 551 =

State highway in Florida, United States

State Road 551
- SR 551 highlighted in red

Route information
- Maintained by FDOT and CFX
- Length: 11.575 mi (18.628 km) 8.785 miles (14.138 km) as SR 551
- Existed: 1947–present

Major junctions
- South end: Cargo Road near Orlando
- SR 15 in Orlando; SR 408 in Azalea Park
- North end: SR 426 at Goldenrod

Location
- Country: United States
- State: Florida

Highway system
- Florida State Highway System; Interstate; US; State; Former; Pre‑1945; Toll; Scenic
← SR 549	→ SR 552

State Road 551 (SR 551), locally known as Goldenrod Road and Palmetto Avenue, forms a north–south surface street bypass of Orlando to the east.

A Central Florida Expressway Authority project known as Goldenrod Road Extension connects to SR 551 just north of SR 15 and extends it south to SR 528 (Beachline Expressway). South of this interchange, the road becomes known as Heintzelman Boulevard and ends south of Orlando International Airport. While SR 551 is maintained by the Florida Department of Transportation, the southern extension is a toll road owned and operated by the Central Florida Expressway Authority (CFX). A toll is required to drive only the section between State Road 528 and Hazeltine National Drive; the rest can be driven without paying.

== Route description ==
The Extension begins at Cargo Road at Orlando International Airport, traveling north for 0.3 miles before an interchange with the five-ramp partial cloverleaf at State Road 528. The next 1.2 miles northward is tolled, with the barrier toll, and then the Extension intersects with Hazeltine National Drive and Lee Vista Boulevard. North of these intersections, there are median breaks for several more intersections, as the road enters a newly developed area, heading towards Hoffner Avenue (State Road 15). At Hoffner Avenue, the Extension heads towards its northern terminus at Goldenrod Road (State Road 551), continuing north as SR 551. Despite SR 551 using the older Goldenrod Road to reach Hoffner Avenue, the main route between Hoffner Avenue and Goldenrod Road is via the Extension, and so it is signed TO SR 551 from Hoffner Avenue.

From the south end, at Cargo Road, Heintzelman Boulevard continues south around the east side of the airport, including two tunnels under taxiways. South of the airport terminals, it curves west to meet Jeff Fuqua Boulevard, which runs from the airport south to Boggy Creek Road (CR 530) and State Road 417.

The southern extension is not assigned a state road number, but the Central Florida Expressway Authority's website displays a shield for State Road 551 Toll. The toll currently costs $0.50 and can be paid with cash, an E-Pass or Uni transponder issued by CFX, or a SunPass transponder issued by the Florida Department of Transportation's Florida Turnpike Enterprise. Although operated by CFX, the money collected at this toll is only used to fund the Extension and is not used for any other CFX roads; conversely, money collected elsewhere on the CFX system is not used for the Extension. Once the cost of building the road is paid off, the road will be transferred to the City of Orlando and the toll will be removed.

== History ==
SR 15A was assigned on December 5, 1947 along pre-1945 State Road 287. It was defined as beginning at a point on SR 15 in Section 23, T 23 S, R 30 E and running North approximately nine miles to intersection with SR 426 in Section 2, T 22 S, R 30 E. Since then, two changes have been made: the number was changed to SR 551 in the early 1980s, and the northernmost piece was moved from Goldenrod Road to Palmetto Avenue to avoid two curves.

Construction on the southern extension began in 2001. It opened March 12, 2003, with a total cost of $38 million. The Orlando Orange County Expressway Authority, predecessor to the CFX, built the road in partnership with the City of Orlando, Orange County, the Greater Orlando Aviation Authority, and several private developers in the area, in order to get it done quickly.

== Major intersections ==
The entire route is in Orange County.

Location	mi	km	Destinations	Notes
Orlando	0.0	0.0	Cargo Road / Heintzelman Boulevard south	Continues south
Orlando	0.3	0.48	SR 528 to I-4 – Cocoa, Kennedy Space Center	Exit 12 on SR 528 (Beachline Expressway)
Orlando	0.7	1.1	Goldenrod Mainline Toll Plaza	
Orlando	2.5	4.0	SR 15 (Hoffner Avenue)	
	2.9 0.000	4.7 0.000	Beatty Drive	Southern terminus of signed SR 551
Azalea Park	2.240	3.605	SR 552 west (Curry Ford Road)	Eastern terminus of SR 552
Azalea Park	3.943	6.346	Lake Underhill Road (CR 526)	
Azalea Park	4.044	6.508	SR 408 – Titusville, Orlando	Exit 16 SR 408 (East-West Expressway)
Azalea Park	5.939	9.558	SR 50 (Colonial Drive) – Orlando, Titusville	
Goldenrod	8.785	14.138	SR 426 (Aloma Avenue)	
1.000 mi = 1.609 km; 1.000 km = 0.621 mi: Electronic toll collection; Route transition
