= Metroplan Orlando =

Metroplan Orlando is the metropolitan planning organization (MPO) for Greater Orlando, Florida, which consists of Orange, Osceola and Seminole Counties. As the regional MPO, Metroplan Orlando provides a forum for multi-modal transportation planning and inter-governmental partnership.

The Metroplan Orlando Board comprises local elected officials and representatives from the Greater Orlando Aviation Authority (GOAA), the Central Florida Expressway Authority (CFX), the Central Florida Regional Transportation Authority (Lynx), and the Sanford Airport Authority. Non-voting members include representatives from Florida Department of Transportation (FDOT) District 5 and Kissimmee Gateway Airport, as well as the Chairpersons from Metroplan Orlando's Citizens' Advisory Committee (CAC), Bicycle & Pedestrian Advisory Committee (BPAC), Transportation Technical Committee (TTC), and Municipal Advisory Committee (MAC).

The major responsibility of the Metroplan Orlando Board is to prioritize transportation projects for funding, including highway, transit, bicycle and pedestrian facilities.
