= Florida State Road 717 =

State highway in Florida, United States

State Road 717
- Canal Street

Route information
- Maintained by FDOT
- Length: 1.714 mi (2.758 km)

Major junctions
- South end: SR 880 / CR 880 in Belle Glade
- North end: SR 715 in Belle Glade

Location
- Country: United States
- State: Florida
- Counties: Palm Beach

Highway system
- Florida State Highway System; Interstate; US; State; Former; Pre‑1945; Toll; Scenic
← SR 716	→ SR 727

State Road 717 (SR 717) is a 1.7-mile-long (2.7 km) northwest-southeast road in Belle Glade, Palm Beach County, Florida, also known as Canal Street.

== Route description ==
Paralleling the Hillsboro Canal its entire length, SR 717 extends from SR 880 and County Road 880 (CR 880) on the eastern edge of the city to the intersection of SR 715 on the western edge of the city. From its northern terminus at SR 715 to the intersection with North Main Street (SR 15-80), SR 717 follows the northern edge of the canal; between SR 15-80 and SR 880-CR 880 it follows the southern edge.

Continuing along East Canal Street past the southern terminus of SR 717, a motorist travels eastward on CR 880, itself a former part of SR 880 - which in turn follows the original configuration of U.S. Route 441 (US 441) and SR 80 between Belle Glade and Twenty Mile Bend.

Some commercially prepared maps erroneously show a "State Road 717" extending eastward from Pahokee on Muck City Road, but this is, in fact, County Road 717 serving the farmlands surrounding Pelican Lake. County Road 717 is often used as a short cut from Pahokee to eastbound US 98/SR 700 to West Palm Beach.

== History ==
The current configuration of the State Road is approximately one-third as long as its original route, which extended northward to the Belle Glade Municipal Golf Course at the edge of the Okeechobee Waterway (a canal ringing Lake Okeechobee), then past the Okeechobee Waterway to Kreamer Island (this "extension" has since been orphaned by Florida Department of Transportation).

== Major intersections ==
The entire route is in Belle Glade, Palm Beach County.

mi	km	Destinations	Notes
0.000	0.000	SR 880 west (M.L. King Jr. Boulevard East) / CR 880 east	Eastern terminus of SR 880; western terminus of CR 880
0.540	0.869	SR 15 south (South Main Street) / SR 80 west	South end of SR 15 / SR 80 overlap
0.588	0.946	SR 15 north (Main Street) / SR 80 east to US 441 / US 98	North end of SR 15 / SR 80 overlap
1.714	2.758	SR 715 (Southwest 16th Street) / CR 717 north (West Canal Street North)	
1.000 mi = 1.609 km; 1.000 km = 0.621 mi: Concurrency terminus
