= Waterford Lakes, Florida =

Master-planned residential community in Orlando, Orange County, Florida

Waterford Lakes
- Unincorporated community
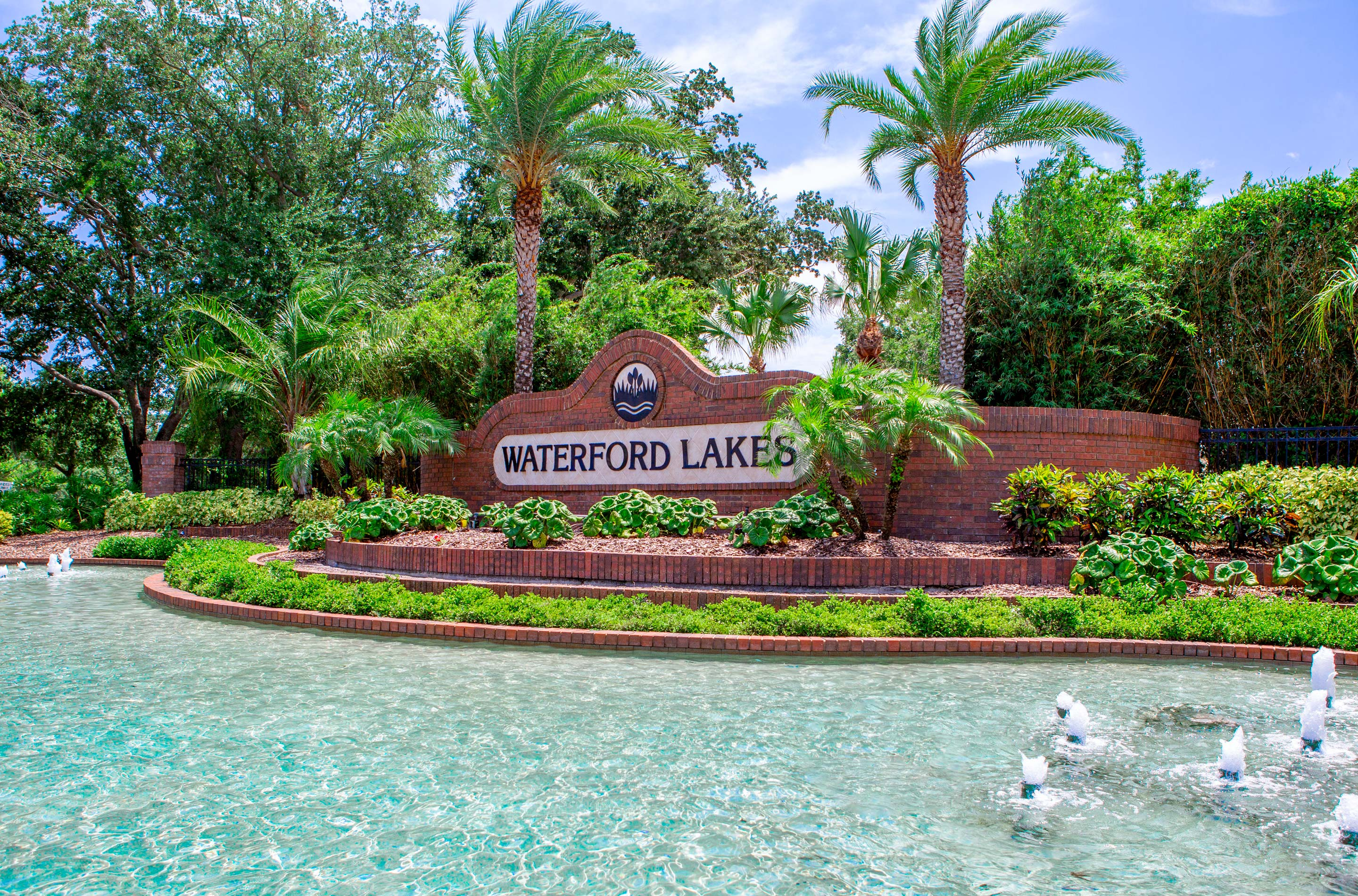
- Waterford Lakes entryway sign
- Interactive map of Waterford Lakes
- Country: United States
- State: Florida
- County: Orange
- Community association incorporated: April 5, 1985
- Time zone: UTC−5 (Eastern (EST))
  - Summer (DST): UTC−4 (EDT)
- ZIP code: 32828
- Website: https://mywaterfordlakes.org

Waterford Lakes is a master-planned residential community and homeowners’ association area located in eastern Orange County, Florida. The community consists of more than 3,100 homes organized under the Waterford Lakes Community Association (WLCA).

== History ==
The development that became Waterford Lakes began in 1985 under the name Huckleberry. The Huckleberry Community Association (HCA) was incorporated on March 29, 1985, and the original Declaration of Covenants and Restrictions was recorded on April 1, 1985.

In 1991, the name of the overall development area was changed from Huckleberry to Waterford Lakes. Throughout the 1990s, Waterford Lakes expanded into multiple neighborhoods and became one of the largest master-planned communities in east Orange County.

== Community Development ==
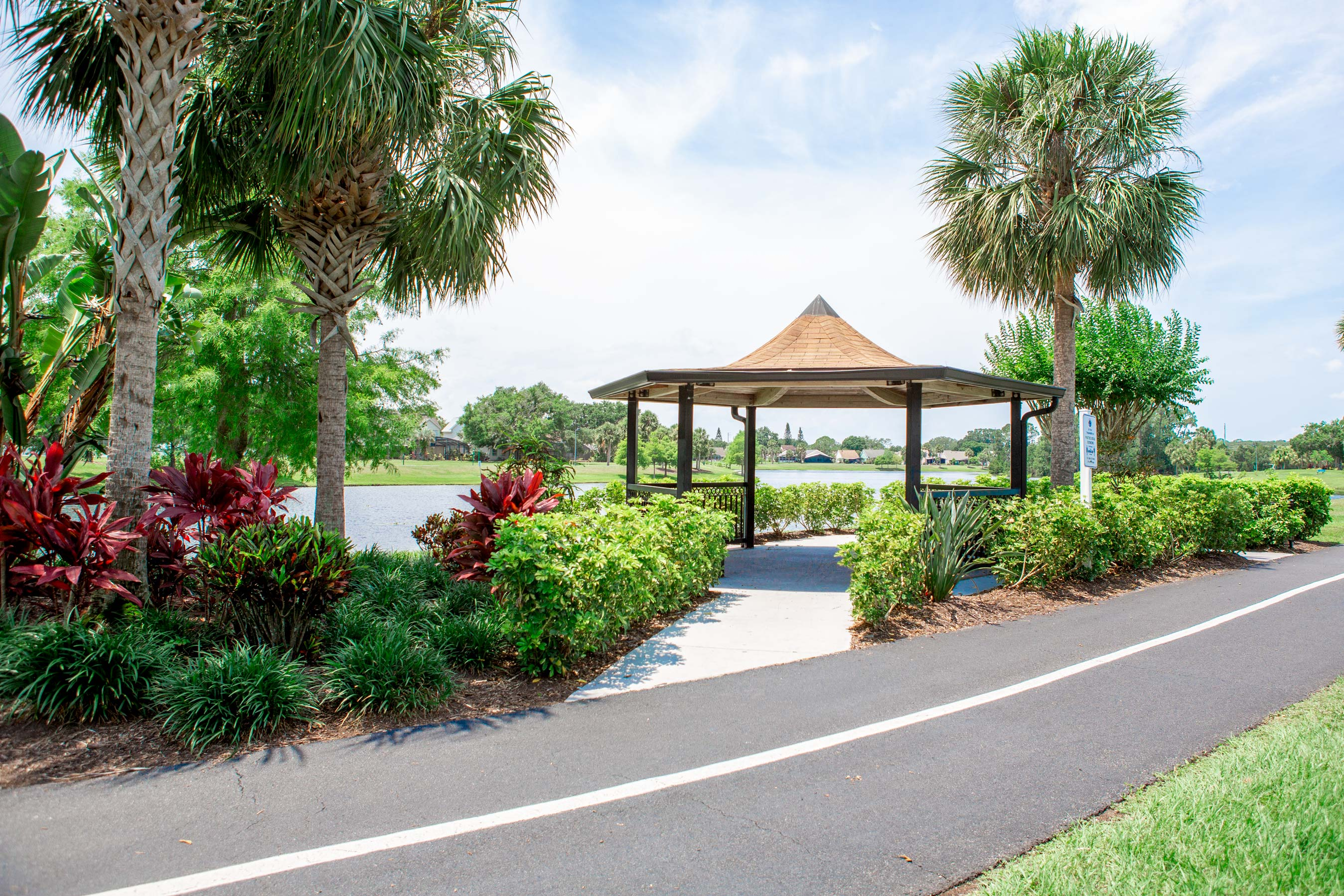
Gazebo within the Waterford Lakes community.

Waterford Lakes was designed as a master-planned residential community featuring parks, lakes, walking trails, sports courts, recreational facilities, and a central community center, all operated by the Waterford Lakes Community Association. Early recreation rules were adopted in 1992, with expanded amenities added in subsequent years.

The community received regional recognition through repeated Parade of Homes awards during the 1990s for “Best Master Planned Community.”

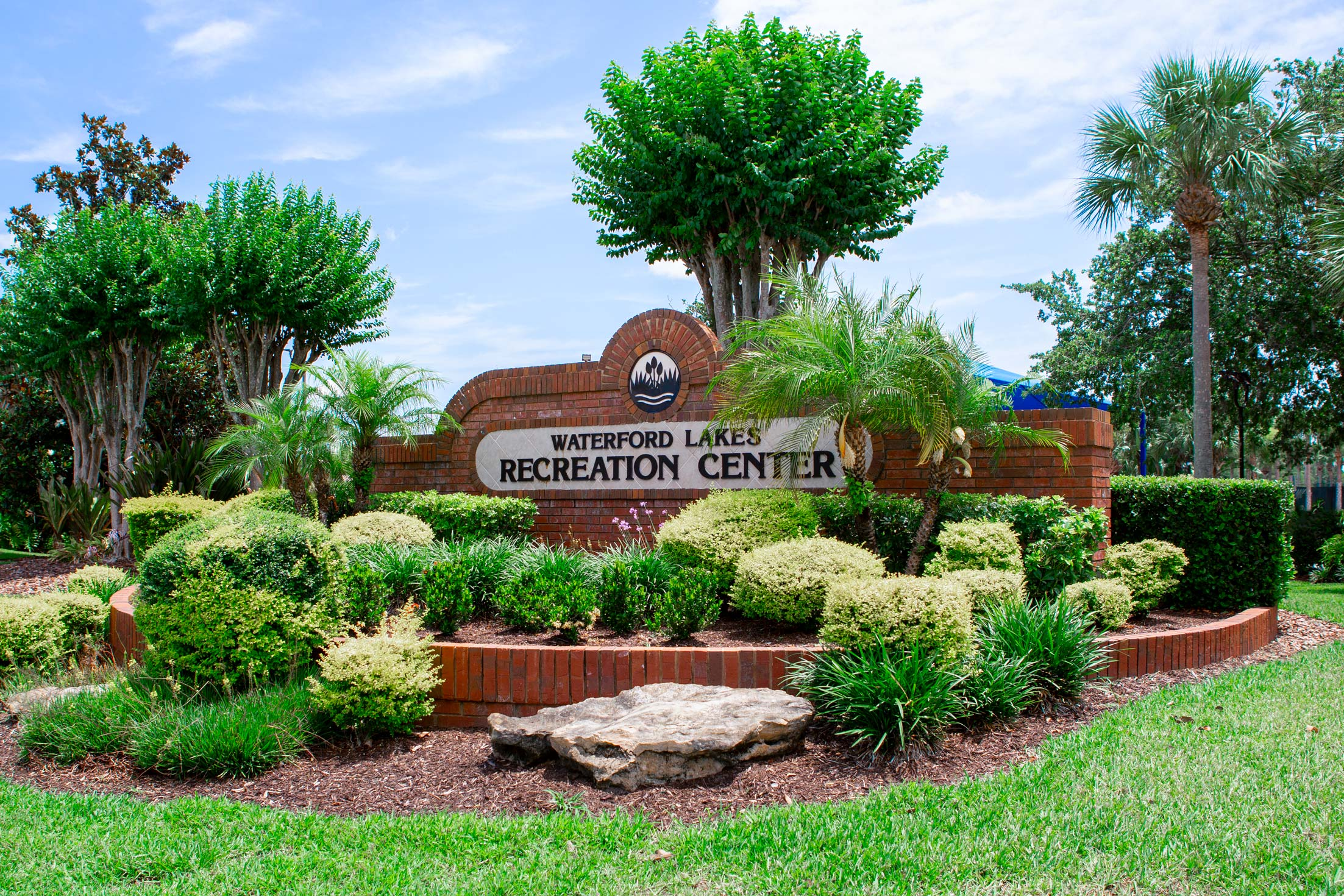
Waterford Lakes Recreation Center sign.

== Waterford Lakes Community ==
The Waterford Lakes Community Association, Inc. (WLCA) is a Florida not-for-profit corporation originally incorporated on April 5, 1985. WLCA operates as the master homeowners’ association for the community, overseeing architectural standards, amenities, common areas, and long-term planning.

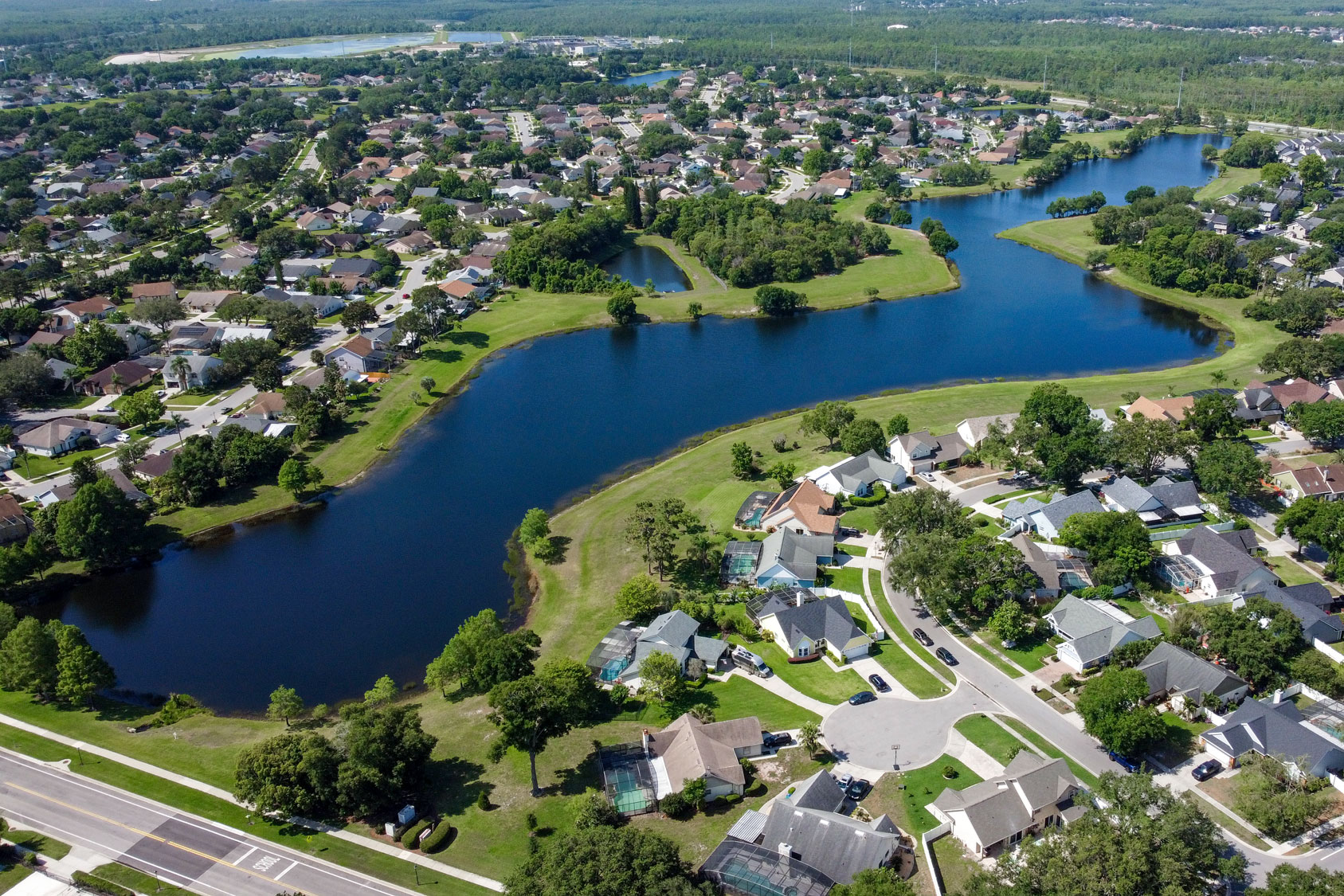
Photo of Waterford Lakes

== Waterford Lakes Town Center ==
The Waterford Lakes Town Center is a separate commercial retail development that opened in 1999 adjacent to the Waterford Lakes residential community.

The center opened in phases between 1999 and 2002, was later sold by Simon Property Group in 2014, and was acquired by Kimco Realty in 2024 for $322 million.
