= St. Johns Country Day School =

Prep school in Orange Park, Florida, US

Coordinates: 30.1450904°N 81.7432511°W

- Orange Park, Florida; United States

Information
- Type: Private
- Motto: “As thy days, so shall thy strength be.” (Deuteronomy 33:25)
- Established: 1953
- Headmaster: Valorie Baker
- Faculty: 77
- Grades: Prekindergarten-12th Grade
- Enrollment: 453 (2021)
- Campus: Suburban
- Colors: Navy Blue, White and Columbia Blue
- Mascot: Sparty
- Yearbook: Chalice
- Tuition (2021-2022): $6750 (Pre-K3) $4300 (Pre-K3 3-Day & Pre-K4) $13,250 (Kindergarten) $14,250 (Grade 1-3) $15,345 (Grade 4-5) $17995(Grade 6) $19995 (Grade 7) $20900 (Grade 8-12)
- Website: http://www.sjcds.net/

St. Johns Country Day School is an independent, coeducational private college preparatory school founded in 1953 in Orange Park, Florida, U.S. It offers a PK–12 education, including a preschool, an elementary school, a middle school, and a high school, and maintains an enrollment of about 450 students each year.

== History ==
St. Johns Country Day School was founded by Dr. Edwin Paul Heinrich and his wife Dorothea Aldine Heinrich on September 14, 1953. The couple moved from Washington, D.C. to Jacksonville, Florida in order to found the first private school in Clay County. The school was named after the St. Johns River, a nearby geographical landmark. The first location of the school was the second floor of a public building at the modern day location of Moosehaven. The first class consisted of 26 students from grades 1-10.

The original location of St. Johns Country Day School

By 1956, the lease on the building was expiring, so the Heinrichs purchased a 26-acre property further south on July 31, 1956. Ground was broken on construction on February 27, 1957, and the new building opened on August 21, 1957. Rod Fisher, longtime science teacher and landmark of the St. Johns campus, was hired in 1967 out of Catawba College. Dr. Heinrich served as the school's headmaster until his retirement in 1970. He was succeeded by Patrick Mackin in September 1970. On October 14, 1976, faulty electrical wiring caught fire and burned down nearly half of the school, leaving classrooms inoperable and causing smoke damage to the library.

== Academics ==
=== Languages ===
St. Johns Country Day offers three languages: Latin, French, and Spanish. Each year students compete in their language's respective competitions: the Florida Junior Classical League Convention, Congrès de la Culture Francaise en Floride, and the Florida State Spanish Conference.

== Athletics ==
St. Johns Country Day School has participated in competitive sports since 1958. The school currently offers soccer, girls weightlifting, basketball, baseball, volleyball, tennis, golf, cheerleading, cross country, track & field, softball, swimming, E-Sports, and football. The girls' soccer team has won the FHSAA Class 1 state championship ten times in a row between 2012 and 2021.

== Notable alumni ==
- Gay Culverhouse, former President of the Tampa Bay Buccaneers and Notre Dame College
- Stephanie Kopelousos, former Secretary of the Florida Department of Transportation
- Mark Mori, American documentary filmmaker
- Carson Pickett, American soccer player
