= Waterford Lakes Town Center =

Outdoor mall in the Orlando, Florida

- Location: Alafaya, Florida
- Opened: October 1999; 27 years ago
- Owner: Kimco Realty
- Floor area: 701,000 square feet (65,100 m^{2})
- Website: waterford.shopkimco.com

Waterford Lakes Town Center is an outdoor shopping mall in Alafaya, within the eastern Orlando metropolitan area, a few miles south of the University of Central Florida on North Alafaya Trail, just off SR 408. The property contains 701,000 square feet of rentable area on 79 acres. With 14.3 million annual visitors, it is the most visited lifestyle center in Florida and the 6th most visited lifestyle center in the U.S.

== History ==
The property opened in October 1999; the third and last phase opened in 2002. In 2014, it was sold by Simon Property Group. In October 2024, Kimco Realty acquired the shopping center from Washington Prime Group for $322 million.

== Tenants ==
=== Anchors and Major Tenants ===
- Regal Cinemas
- Barnes & Noble
- Ashley HomeStore
- Target
- TJ Maxx
- Best Buy
- PetSmart
- Five Below
- Ross
- Macy's
- Torrid

=== Restaurants ===
- Five Guys
- Pizza Hut
- Chick-fil-A
- Raising Cane's Chicken Fingers
- Longhorn Steakhouse
- Miller's Ale House
- Panera Bread
- Cooper's Hawk
- Zoes Kitchen
- Little Greek Fresh Grill

=== Former Tenants ===
- Aeropostale - Closed 2016
- MovieStop - Closed 2016
- The Children's Place - Closed January 28, 2017
- Romano's Macaroni Grill - Closed January 30, 2015
- Johnny Rockets - Closed October 2008
- Barnes & Noble - Closed 2021
- Bed Bath & Beyond - Closed 2023
- TGI Fridays - Closed 2024
