= Florida State Road 880 =

State highway in Florida, United States

State Road 880 and County Road 880
- SR 880 in red, CR 880 in blue

Route information
- Maintained by FDOT and Palm Beach E&PW
- Length: 19.175 mi (30.859 km) 0.475 mi (0.764 km) as SR 880

Major junctions
- West end: SR 80 / SR 15 in Belle Glade
- SR 717 in Belle Glade
- East end: US 98 / US 441 / SR 80 in Twenty Mile Bend

Location
- Country: United States
- State: Florida
- County: Palm Beach

Highway system
- Florida State Highway System; Interstate; US; State; Former; Pre‑1945; Toll; Scenic
← SR 878	→ SR 882

State Road 880 (SR 880) is a 0.475 miles (0.764 km) long state highway in Belle Glade, Florida, running from SR 80 and SR 15 east to State Road 717. From here, it continues east for almost 19 miles (31 km) to Twenty Mile Bend as County Road 880 (CR 880).

== Route description ==
SR 880 begins in Belle Glade, Florida at an intersection with SR 80 and SR 15. From here, it heads east on Dr. Martin Luther King Jr. Boulevard for about half a mile, where it intersects with SR 717. SR 717 terminates at this intersection and SR 880 becomes CR 880. CR 880 heads out of Belle Glade heading east-southeast.

Along the route, there are bends in the road named Six Mile Bend, Nine Mile Bend, and Twenty Mile Bend which are each named for their distance from Belle Glade. CR 880 intersects with CR 827 at Six Mile Bend. At Twenty Mile Bend, CR 880 terminates at Southern Boulevard (which carries SR 80, US 98, and US 441).

== C-51 Canal Bridge ==
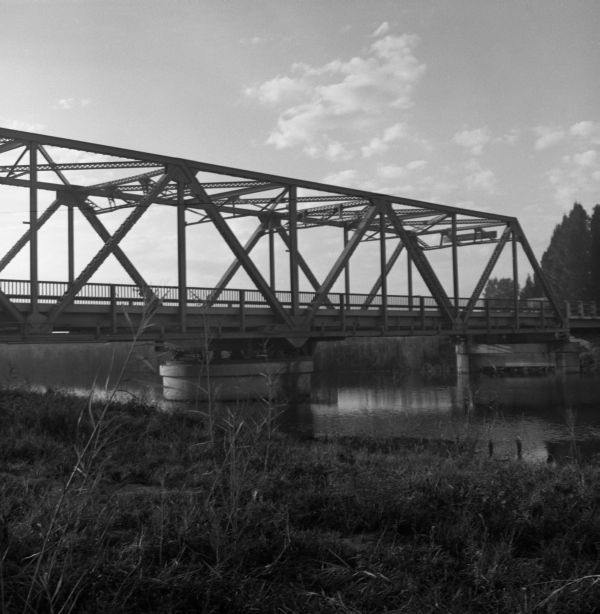
CR 880 bridge over the C-51 canal

Just south of its intersection with SR 80/US 98/US 441 in Twenty Mile Bend, CR 880 crosses the C-51 canal on a historic truss bridge. This bridge was built in 1937 and is a Warren through-truss swing bridge. However, the bridge is now a fixed-bridge and can no longer swing open. It is the second-oldest bridge in Palm Beach County after the nearby Torry Island Swing Bridge in Belle Glade.

== History ==
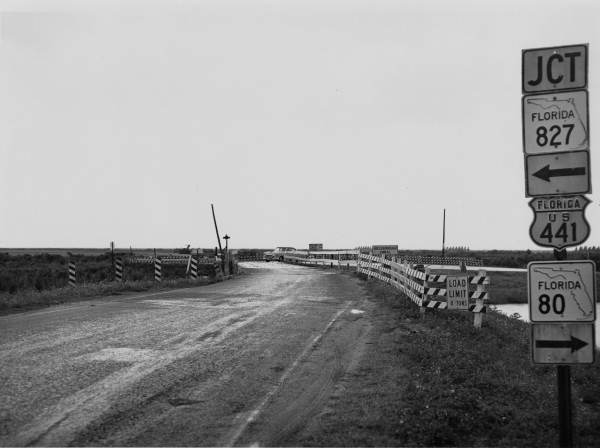
Six Mile Bend in 1953 with former SR 80 and US 441 signage

The entire route of SR 880 and CR 880 is a former alignment of SR 80 and US 441. The route from Belle Glade to Palm Beach was complete in 1923 as part of SR 80 (which was designated SR 25 prior to the 1945 Florida State Road renumbering).

The current four-lane alignment of SR 80 and US 441 to the north (designated as the Kenneth C. Mock Memorial Highway) was built in 1989. After SR 80 and US 441 were rerouted, the original route was redesignated as SR 880. SR 880 east of SR 717 was then redesignated as CR 880 when it was transferred to county control on August 2, 1994.

== Major intersections ==
The entire route is in Palm Beach County.

Location	mi	km	Destinations	Notes
Belle Glade	0.000	0.000	SR 80 / SR 15 north (Main Street) to US 27 / US 441	Southern terminus of SR 15
Belle Glade	0.475 0.0	0.764 0.0	SR 717 north (Canal Street South)	Transition from SR 880 to CR 880
Six Mile Bend	5.3	8.5	CR 827 east (Browns Farms Road)	Western terminus of CR 827 (former SR 827)
Twenty Mile Bend	18.5	29.8	CR 700 west	Former routing of US 98 / US 441 / SR 80
Twenty Mile Bend	18.7	30.1	US 98 / US 441 / SR 80	
1.000 mi = 1.609 km; 1.000 km = 0.621 mi: Route transition
