= Stephanie Kopelousos =

Stephanie C. Kopelousos
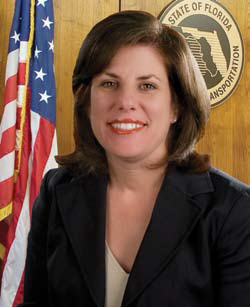
- Stephanie Kopelousos

Secretary of the Florida Department of Transportation
- In office April 2007 – February 2011
- Governor: Charlie Crist; Rick Scott
- Preceded by: Denver Stutler
- Succeeded by: Ananth Prasad

Personal details
- Born: Stavroula Constantin Kopelousos; January 13, 1970 (age 56) Jacksonville, Florida
- Party: Republican

Stephanie C. Kopelousos (born January 13, 1970) is the District Administrator of the Central Florida Tourism Oversight District and the chair of the Greater Orlando Aviation Authority.

From 2007 through 2011, Kopelousos served as secretary of the Florida Department of Transportation, being appointed to the role by then-governor Charlie Crist. She was the first woman to serve the position, as well as the youngest, at age 37. After resigning in 2011, she served as county manager of Clay County from 2011 to 2018, then as Director of Legislative and Intergovernment Affairs for Governor Ron DeSantis.

== Early years ==
She was born Stavroula Constantin Kopelousos in Jacksonville in 1970, but she was always called Stephanie by her Greek family. Her grandfather George opened the popular Garden Restaurant in Starke in 1958, and her father Gus managed it until he sold it in 2008. She grew up in Clay County, attended St. Johns Country Day School until her mother died in 1984. She graduated from Bradford High School in 1988.

Kopelousos attended the University of Alabama, majored in political science, and aspired to a career in public policy. After graduating in 1993, she relocated to Washington, D.C. While looking for position in government, she took a hostess job to pay her bills.

== Career ==
=== Washington ===
A family friend who also attended the Greek Orthodox Church in Jacksonville knew U.S. Representative Tillie Fowler and recommended Kopelousos, who was hired as an intern. In just one month, Kopelousos was promoted to staff assistant. In less than five years, she had risen to senior legislative aide, and had become well known in transportation circles on Capital Hill. In 2001, Fowler retired and Kopelousos became Washington liaison (lobbyist) for both the FDOT and the Florida Department of Community Affairs. According to Fowler's former chief-of-staff David Gilliand, "Some of the smartest people on Capitol Hill are the biggest jerks, and that limits them. Stephanie succeeds because she’s the whole package: She’s smart, she’s prepared, she works hard, and everyone likes her."

=== Tallahassee ===
Denver Stutler was appointed as FDOT Secretary by then Governor Jeb Bush in 2005, and Stutler hired Kopelousos as his chief of staff in Tallahassee. When Governor Crist was elected in 2007, he chose Kopelousos as FDOT Secretary over several other more qualified candidates, including a more experienced female transportation engineer. She served as head of the agency from 2007 to 2011. U.S. Representative Mario Díaz-Balart honored Kopelousos on March 16, 2009, when he read a proclamation into the Congressional Record praising her FDOT work.

==== Billboards ====
In early 2009, Bill Salter Advertising obtained 105 permits to remove trees blocking the view of their billboards. State law gives the Florida Department of Transportation some discretion over the applicant's submission of a mitigation plan, and the amount of fees paid to the state, which can be as much as $30,000 per billboard. The law also requires that the company surrender two existing billboards for every permit issued for a "non-complying" (built before 1996) billboard. There were 28 non-complying permits. The Salter permits were exempted from all requirements, potentially saving the company millions of dollars. Salter's general manager Dave McCurdy, who was not only a high school classmate, but "close friends" with Greg Evers, stated: "On January 8th, 2009, I spoke with State Representative Mr. Greg Evers and Secretary of Transportation Ms. Stephanie Kopelousos about this and they agreed and we were granted these permits." At the time, the House transportation committee was chaired by Evers, who claimed, "I have helped constituents that I have never met personally and constituents that I know from my community. That is my job." Kopelousos insisted, "The decision in question was made at the District Office level, and I was not involved with the apparent issuance of any permit related to this matter."

A grand jury of Florida's Second Judicial district-Leon County investigated the FDOT in the Spring term of 2011. They concluded that "FDOT District 3 staffer Wilks knew the law and the FDOT rules, but was instructed to circumvent it. Yet the only measure taken by FDOT to address the issue once it came to light in the press was to offer training to Wilks and his staff on the law and FDOT rules. Neither James Rodgers nor any other FDOT employee was disciplined as a result of this debacle. To the contrary, James Rodgers was allowed to remain in his position for eighteen additional months through mid-year 2011 and he retired with full benefits."

==== Commuter rail ====
Part of the Florida SunRail project involved the purchase of tracks owned by CSX Transportation. The $1.2 billion bill was written by FDOT with major input from CSX, and a major issue involved liability and indemnification for incidents on Amtrak trains operating on tracks owned by SunRail. Months before the issue came to a vote, Florida Senator Paula Dockery, an opponent of the legislation, made a public records request for all emails to and from the FDOT concerning SunRail, CSX and Amtrak. The FDOT responded that no emails had the subject lines "rail," "SunRail" or "CSX". After the bill passed, the FDOT released over 8,000 pages of emails. Some emails with important documents attached had the subject "waffles" or "french toast". Critics referred to the controversy as Wafflegate, and claimed the FDOT was attempting to circumvent the Florida Sunshine Law. Kopelousos claimed that the departments first response was an honest mistake. Regarding the breakfast foods, she stated, "The reality of it is I get hundreds of E-mails in a day. Staff was trying to find an easy way that I would be able to search without getting back hundreds of responses."

Governor Crist ordered an investigation, and Kopelousos was cleared. The Chief Inspector General's report stated, "No evidence was found to suggest that any department official intentionally withheld documents in violation of the law. To the contrary, evidence shows that unintentional, human error occurred during the initial public records request." A government clerk searched the "to/from" field rather than the email contents.

=== Green Cove Springs ===
Kopelousos resigned as FDOT secretary after Rick Scott's election as governor in November 2010. She worked for a time as a consultant for U.S. Representative John Mica, chairman of the House Transportation and Infrastructure Committee before applying for the position of Clay County Manager where she grew up and her father still resided. She was selected and began work there on March 21, 2011, at an annual salary of $177,000.

=== Governor's staff ===
Shortly after his election to governor in the Fall of 2018, Ron DeSantis appointed Kopelousos as his Director of Legislative Affairs starting January 9, 2019. The job requires her to develop and maintain effective relationships with state legislators, their staff, lobbyists and other government officials. She also must convey the governor's position regarding relevant policy and legislation. In March 2021, her position was expanded to include intergovernment as well as legislative affairs.
