= Denver Stutler =

American engineer, politician (born 1966)

Denver J. Stutler, Jr.

Secretary of the Florida Department of Transportation
- In office June 2005 – December 2006
- Governor: Jeb Bush
- Preceded by: Jose Abreu
- Succeeded by: Stephanie Kopelousos

Personal details
- Born: 1966 (age 59–60)
- Party: Republican
- Education: University of Central Florida
- Profession: Engineer

Denver J. Stutler Jr. is an American engineer who served as the Secretary of the Florida Department of Transportation from June 2005 to December 2006 under then-Florida Governor Jeb Bush. Stutler previously served as chief of staff to Governor Bush before becoming secretary.

Stutler hired Stephanie Kopelousos as his chief of staff at FDOT; she later succeeded him as Secretary. After leaving government, he became CEO of P3 Development Company, LLC in Tallahassee, Florida. He is an alumnus of the University of Central Florida, graduating with a bachelor's degree in 1987, and a master's degree in civil engineering in 1989.

Currently, Stutler is the co-founder and CEO U.S. Submergent Technologies.
