= Orlando Fighter Wing =

- Active: 1942–1944
- Country: United States
- Branch: United States Army Air Forces
- Role: Fighter
- Garrison/HQ: Orlando Army Air Base, Florida

The Orlando Fighter Wing was a wing of the United States Army Air Forces. Its last assignment was with the Army Air Forces School of Applied Tactics, stationed at Orlando Army Air Base, Florida It was inactivated on 1 April 1944.

The wing helped to develop air defense tactics and trained organizations and personnel in air defense techniques. Also served in defense of the Orlando area, using such tactical organizations as were assigned or attached. Provided defense for the Orlando area but engaged primarily in training fighter and light bombardment organizations and personnel.

== Lineage ==
- Constituted as Air Defense Department, AAF School of Applied Tactics on 27 Nov 1942

Activated on 3 Dec 1942
Redesignated Orlando Fighter Wing in Oct 1943
Disbanded on 1 Apr 1944

== Assignments ==
- Army Air Forces School of Applied Tactics, 3 Dec 1942 – 1 Apr 1944

== Stations ==
- Orlando Army Air Base, Florida, 3 Dec 1942 – 1 Apr 1944
