= Chris Gutierrez (baseball) =

American baseball player

- Infielder
- Born: March 12, 1984 (age 41); Orlando, Florida, U.S.
- Bats: Right Throws: Right

Christopher Gutierrez (born March 12, 1984) is an American professional baseball player of Cuban descent who mainly played in Minor League Baseball, having tallied 872 games with four different organizations: the Los Angeles Dodgers, Florida/Miami Marlins, Toronto Blue Jays, and Los Angeles Angels affiliates. At the NCAA Division One level, he was a three-time All-Big 12 shortstop at Oklahoma State from 2002 to 2005. He is from Orlando, Florida and led Conway Little League with Zack Greinke to its first Senior League World Series in 1999.

Gutierrez was the Dodgers bench coach for the Triple–A Oklahoma City Comets from 2023 through 2025.

== Career ==
=== Boone High School ===
Gutierrez played baseball in high school at William R. Boone High School in Orlando, Florida. He received numerous accolades, including being named a first-team all-county, all-metro, and all-state selection for four consecutive years. Gutierrez was recognized as the team's offensive MVP from 1999 to 2001 and the defensive MVP in 2001–02. He exhibited exceptional discipline at the plate, leading the county in walks during his junior and senior years and maintained a batting average of over .400 throughout his high school career. Furthermore, Gutierrez had the opportunity to represent the USA Youth National team in 1999 and 2000, winning the PAL World Championships.

=== Oklahoma State Cowboys ===
Gutierrez chose to play college baseball for the Oklahoma State Cowboys baseball team from 2003 to 2004. In 2003, as a true freshman, he started 53 games and achieved a batting average of .304 with one home run and 23 RBIs. He proved to be a threat on the base paths, stealing nine bases in 10 attempts. Gutierrez displayed consistency by recording 13 multi-hit games and six multi-RBI games. Notably, he achieved a career-high of five hits in a game against Missouri. Against right-handed pitchers, he maintained a .327 batting average. Additionally, Gutie led the team with 141 assists.

In 2004, he played as a shortstop in all 62 games and received recognition as a second-team All-Big 12 by the coaches. Throughout the season, he maintained a .269 batting average, hitting 10 doubles, a triple, and five home runs, while driving in 40 runs. Gutierrez showcased his consistency with 16 multiple-hit and 10 multi-RBI games.

Gutierrez die not commit a single error in 26 conference games, making 106 attempts. In a series against Louisiana Tech, he went 4-for-10, scoring six runs and driving in five RBIs. During the same series, He achieved a career-high five RBIs and four runs scored in a single game.

=== Minor League Baseball ===
Gutierrez signed with the Toronto Blue Jays as an undrafted free agent in 2005 and played for the Pulaski Blue Jays, Auburn Doubledays, Lansing Lugnuts, Dunedin Blue Jays, New Hampshire Fisher Cats and Syracuse Chiefs.

Released by the Blue Jays organization on June 17, 2009, he signed with the Los Angeles Angels organization two days later and was assigned to the Triple–A Salt Lake Bees before being demoted a month later to the Double–A Arkansas Travelers. With Arkansas, he batted .279 in 33 games.

In 2010, he played for the Dodgers' affiliate Inland Empire 66ers in the Class–A California League, batting .312 in 121 games, the most games in a season in his career. In 2011 he joined the Florida Marlins organization and played for the Jacksonville Suns and the New Orleans Zephyrs, and he continued to alternate between those two teams through 2013.

=== Coaching career ===
Gutierrez retired after the 2013 season and joined the Chicago Cubs organization as a minor league coach, first as an assistant hitting coach for the Kane County Cougars and then the following year for the Myrtle Beach Pelicans.

In 2018, Gutierrez joined the Dodgers organization, spending two seasons as a hitting coach for the Arizona League Dodgers He was scheduled to return in the role in 2020 as well but the season was cancelled because of the COVID-19 pandemic. He was promoted to bench coach for the Double–A Tulsa Drillers in 2021 and then to the same position for the Dodgers Triple–A team in Oklahoma City in 2023.

== Personal life ==
He was born on March 12, 1984, in Orlando, Florida. He is the son of Eddie and Maria Gutierrez. He was an economics major at OSU.
