= West Oaks Mall (Orlando) =

Shopping mall in Ocoee, Florida

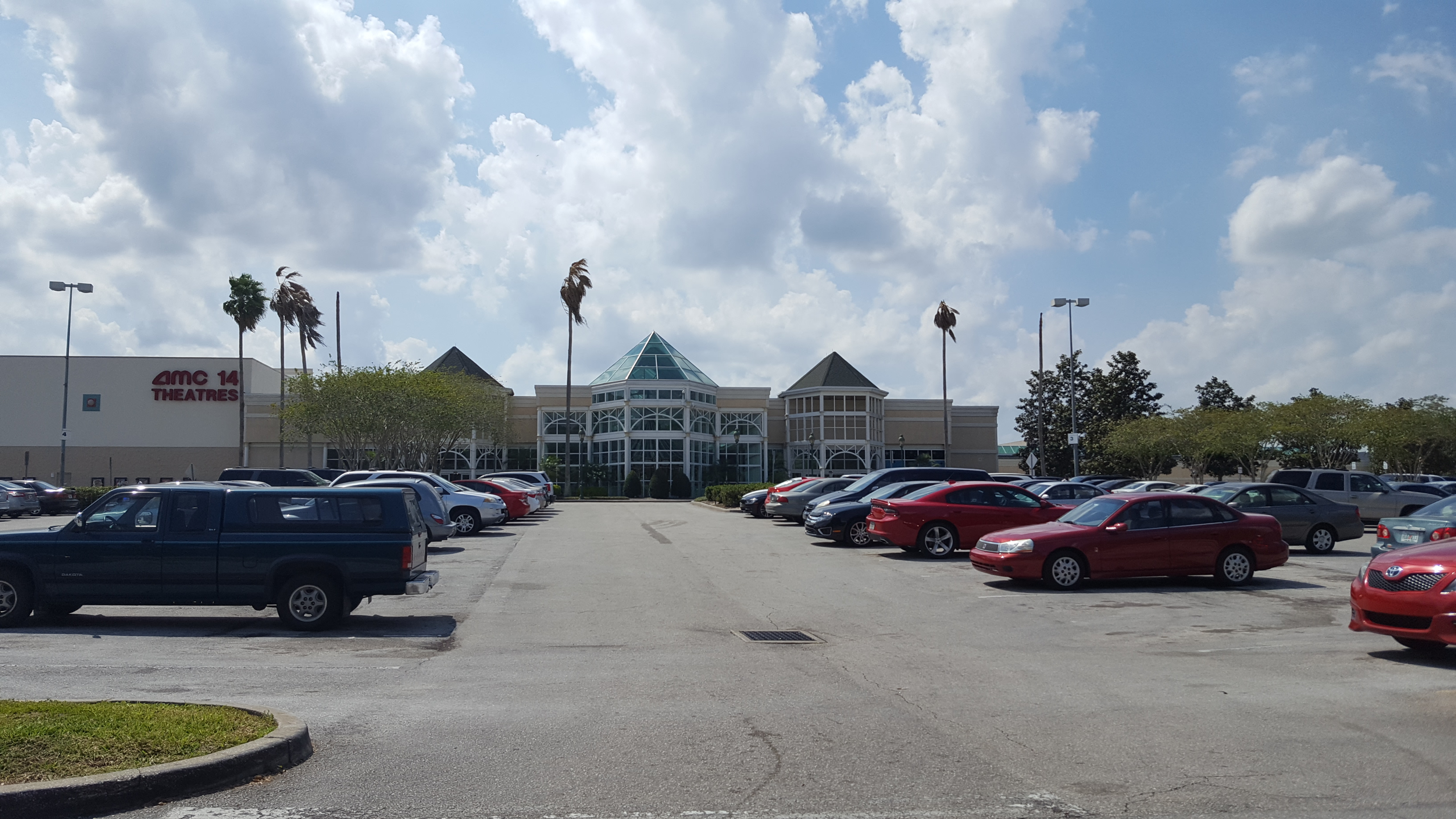
- Exterior view of West Oaks Mall, April 2017
- Location: 9401 W Colonial Dr. Ocoee, Florida
- Coordinates: 28.5569°N 81.5156°W
- Opened: October 2, 1996; 30 years ago
- Developer: Homart Development Company
- Manager: Moonbeam Capital Investments
- Owner: Moonbeam Capital Investments
- Num. of stores: 125 (61 open)
- Num. of anchor tenants: 5 (4 open, 1 vacant)
- Floor area: 1,077,481 sq ft.
- Floors: 1 (2 in some anchors)
- Parking: 5,500 spaces
- Public transit: 54, 105, 125, 611, 613 at the West Oaks Mall SuperStop
- Website: www.westoaksmall.com

West Oaks Mall is a super-regional enclosed shopping mall in Ocoee, Florida. The mall is located west of Orlando at the intersection of Colonial Drive (SR 50) and Clarke Road near Florida's Turnpike, the East–West Expressway (SR 408), and the Western Beltway (SR 429). It was opened in 1996 and is currently owned by Moonbeam Capital Investments.

The single-floor mall spans 1.1 million square feet (100,000 m^{2}) with 125 store spaces and five anchor spaces. It is currently anchored by Dillard's Clearance Center, JCPenney, a 14-screen AMC theater, and a SunPass customer service center, with the fifth anchor building vacant.

== History ==
The West Oaks Mall, originally called the Lake Lotta Mall, was announced in April 1995 when the Homart Development Company bought 130 acres of land for the mall. Designed by the Atlanta-based design firm Thompson, Ventulett, Steinbeck, and Associates, the mall was slated to be a total of 950,000 sq ft, with anchors Sears, Dillard's, Gayfers, and JCPenney as well as 125 specialty stores and a multi-screen theater. By June 1996, the mall, now managed by General Growth Properties after their takeover of Homart's mall-development arm, had reached 73% occupancy, with the opening pushed back to October 2. In September 1996, it was announced the mall was to feature a 600 sq ft playground, designed by International Inc of New Braunfels, Texas. The mall opened October 2 to a crowd of 30,000 people.

In December 1996, AMC Theatres requested to be able to expand their planned 14-screen theater into a 24-screen theater, however this was not approved. The 14-screen theater opened on March 19, 1997.

The Gayfers location was sold to Saks Incorporated. Saks Inc rebranded this location as Parisian in 1998, after its acquisition by Dillard's that year. In February 2004, it was announced that the Parisian location would be converted to McRae's, which it operated as for around a year, when Belk acquired the Proffitt's-McRae's stores from Saks in April 2005. In 2008, it was announced that the Belk location at the mall would be closing by the end of February. At the time, owners GGP had announced speculative plans to demolish the anchor building for lifestyle-center style tenants, but this never occurred.

In 2012, it was announced that Sears would be closing its location at the mall by January 2013, along with 10 others, with plans to sell the properties to GGP. The space remained vacant until 2016, when it was converted into a customer service center for SunPass, operated by Xerox Corp. In November 2012, the mall was purchased by Moonbeam Capital Investments, for $15.9 million. In 2017, it was announced that a call center operated by Bed Bath & Beyond would take over half of the former Belk anchor, with plans to create 500 jobs by 2018.

The small chain tenants at the mall remaining during the decline of the mall include Banter by Piercing Pagoda, and Rainbow. These are all still open.

Foot Locker and The Children's Place closed in 2022. Jimmy Jazz closed in 2023. Champs Sports, Spencer's, and Underground by Journeys closed in 2024. Bath and Body Works closed in 2025.
