= Alafaya, Florida =

Unincorporated area in Florida, US

- Census-designated place
- Location of Alafaya in Orange County, Florida.
- Coordinates: 28°31′40″N 81°10′36″W
- Country: United States
- State: Florida
- County: Orange

Area
  - Total: 31.33 sq mi (81.15 km^{2})
  - Land: 30.64 sq mi (79.36 km^{2})
  - Water: 0.69 sq mi (1.79 km^{2})
- Elevation: 75 ft (23 m)

Population (2020)
  - Total: 92,452
  - Density: 3,017.3/sq mi (1,164.99/km^{2})
- Time zone: UTC-5 (Eastern (EST))
  - Summer (DST): UTC-4 (EDT)
- ZIP codes: 32816, 32820, 32825, 32826, 32828, 32831, 32833, 32834, 32878
- Area codes: 407, 689
- FIPS code: 12-00410
- GNIS feature ID: 2583321

Alafaya is a census-designated place and unincorporated area in Orange County, Florida, United States. The population was 92,452 at the 2020 US census. It is part of the Orlando–Kissimmee–Sanford, Florida Metropolitan Statistical Area. It is most known for being near the University of Central Florida, Avalon Park and Waterford Lakes.

== Geography ==
Alafaya is located in eastern Orange County, Florida, in a broad zone south of State Road 50. The approximate center of Alafaya lies 9 miles (14 km) east of downtown Orlando.

According to the United States Census Bureau, the CDP has a total area of 38.1 square miles (98.6 km^{2}), of which 38.0 square miles (98.3 km^{2}) is land and 0.077 square miles (0.2 km^{2}), or 0.25%, is water.

== Demographics ==
Historical population
Census	Pop.	Note	%±
2010	78,113		—
2020	92,452		18.4%
U.S. Decennial Census

Alafaya first appeared as a census designated place in the 2010 U.S. census.

=== Racial and ethnic composition ===
Alfaya CDP, Florida – Racial and ethnic composition Note: the US Census treats Hispanic/Latino as an ethnic category. This table excludes Latinos from the racial categories and assigns them to a separate category. Hispanics/Latinos may be of any race.
Race / Ethnicity (NH = Non-Hispanic)	Pop 2010	Pop 2020	% 2010	% 2020
White alone (NH)	38,220	35,254	48.93%	38.13%
Black or African American alone (NH)	7,035	9,310	9.01%	10.07%
Native American or Alaska Native alone (NH)	107	97	0.14%	0.10%
Asian alone (NH)	5,198	7,226	6.65%	7.82%
Native Hawaiian or Pacific Islander alone (NH)	48	74	0.06%	0.08%
Other race alone (NH)	270	873	0.35%	0.94%
Mixed race or Multiracial (NH)	1,787	4,034	2.29%	4.36%
Hispanic or Latino (any race)	25,448	35,584	32.58%	38.49%
Total	78,113	92,452	100.00%	100.00%

=== 2020 census ===
As of the 2020 census, Alafaya had a population of 92,452 and 31,847 households. The median age was 34.2 years. 23.9% of residents were under the age of 18 and 10.1% of residents were 65 years of age or older. For every 100 females there were 94.4 males, and for every 100 females age 18 and over there were 91.5 males age 18 and over. The census reported a population density of 3,017.4 people per square mile and an average of 2.99 persons per household.

97.5% of residents lived in urban areas, while 2.5% lived in rural areas.

There were 31,847 households in Alafaya, of which 39.4% had children under the age of 18 living in them. Of all households, 51.9% were married-couple households, 15.8% were households with a male householder and no spouse or partner present, and 24.5% were households with a female householder and no spouse or partner present. About 17.3% of all households were made up of individuals and 4.1% had someone living alone who was 65 years of age or older.

There were 33,372 housing units, of which 4.6% were vacant. The homeowner vacancy rate was 1.2% and the rental vacancy rate was 6.3%.

Racial composition as of the 2020 census
Race	Number	Percent
White	43,346	46.9%
Black or African American	10,416	11.3%
American Indian and Alaska Native	341	0.4%
Asian	7,367	8.0%
Native Hawaiian and Other Pacific Islander	81	0.1%
Some other race	10,583	11.4%
Two or more races	20,318	22.0%

=== 2017–2021 American Community Survey ===
From 2017 to 2021, the estimated median household income was $85,056 and the per capita income was $33,866. About 10.4% of the population lived below the poverty threshold.

The median gross rent was $1,608; 97.7% of households had a computer and 95.5% had a broadband Internet subscription.

In the same period, 63.6% of housing units were owner-occupied. The median value of owner-occupied housing units was $307,900, and the median monthly owner costs were $1,843 with a mortgage and $565 without one.

Among residents 25 years and older, 92.7% were high school graduates or higher and 45.0% had a Bachelor's degree or higher.

=== 2010 census ===
As of the 2010 United States census, there were 78,113 people, 25,431 households, and 18,709 families residing in the CDP.

=== Ancestry ===
Alafaya has the 10th-highest number of Palestinian-Americans in the United States.

== Educational institutions ==
- Timber Creek High School
- Discovery Middle School
- Legacy Middle School
- Avalon Middle School
- Castle Creek Elementary
- Andover Elementary School
- Sunrise Elementary School
- Waterford Elementary School
- Timber Springs Middle School
- Timber Lakes Elementary School
- Stone Lakes Elementary School
