= Conway, Florida =

Unincorporated area in Florida, US

- Census-designated place
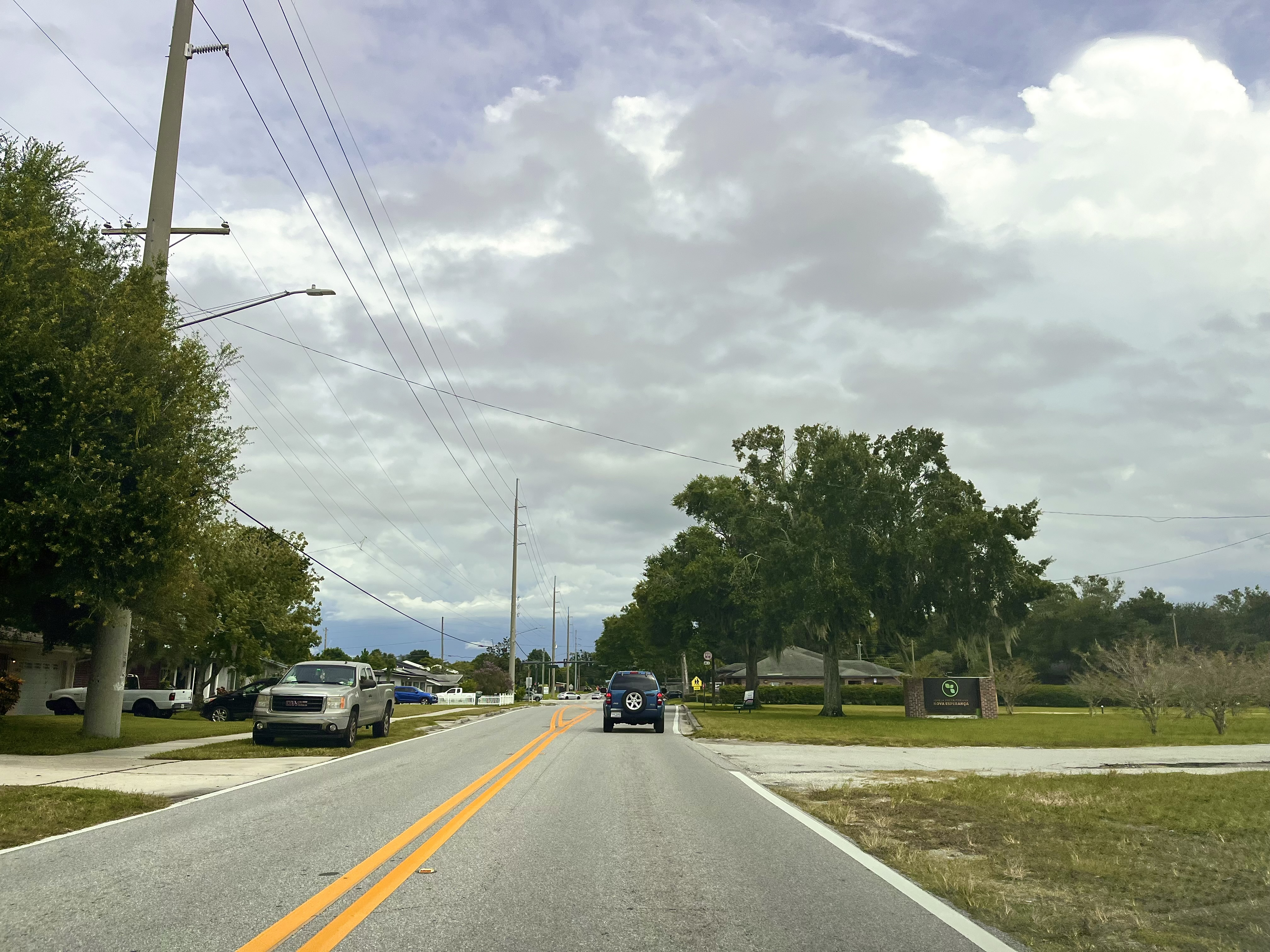
- Entering Conway

- Location in Orange County and the state of Florida
- Coordinates: 28°30′14″N 81°20′08″W
- Country: United States
- State: Florida
- County: Orange

Area
  - Total: 3.56 sq mi (9.22 km^{2})
  - Land: 3.39 sq mi (8.77 km^{2})
  - Water: 0.17 sq mi (0.45 km^{2})
- Elevation: 102 ft (31 m)

Population (2020)
  - Total: 13,596
  - Density: 4,015.7/sq mi (1,550.46/km^{2})
- Time zone: UTC-5 (Eastern (EST))
  - Summer (DST): UTC-4 (EDT)
- FIPS code: 12-14050
- GNIS feature ID: 2402795

Conway is a census-designated place and an unincorporated area in Orange County, Florida, United States. As of the 2020 census, Conway had a population of 13,596. It is part of the Orlando–Kissimmee–Sanford, Florida Metropolitan Statistical Area.

Settled in the 1850s, Conway was an important place in the early 1900s. One of the first five paved highways built in Orange County was the brick Conway Road from Orlando to Conway, running along what is now Briercliff Drive, Curry Ford Road, and Conway Road, ending at Anderson Road, the center of Conway.

== Geography ==
According to the United States Census Bureau, the CDP has a total area of 9.4 km^{2} (3.6 sq mi), of which 8.9 km^{2} (3.4 sq mi) is land and 0.4 km^{2} (0.15 sq mi) (4.70%) is water.

== Demographics ==
Historical population
Census	Pop.	Note	%±
1970	8,642		—
1980	24,027		178.0%
1990	13,159		−45.2%
2000	14,394		9.4%
2010	13,467		−6.4%
2020	13,596		1.0%

=== 2020 census ===
As of the 2020 census, Conway had a population of 13,596. The median age was 42.5 years. 18.5% of residents were under the age of 18 and 17.3% of residents were 65 years of age or older. For every 100 females there were 96.4 males, and for every 100 females age 18 and over there were 94.3 males age 18 and over.

100.0% of residents lived in urban areas, while 0.0% lived in rural areas.

There were 5,258 households in Conway, of which 27.7% had children under the age of 18 living in them. Of all households, 51.8% were married-couple households, 15.8% were households with a male householder and no spouse or partner present, and 24.0% were households with a female householder and no spouse or partner present. About 21.6% of all households were made up of individuals and 8.9% had someone living alone who was 65 years of age or older.

There were 5,464 housing units, of which 3.8% were vacant. The homeowner vacancy rate was 0.8% and the rental vacancy rate was 5.0%.

Racial composition as of the 2020 census
Race	Number	Percent
White	9,693	71.3%
Black or African American	575	4.2%
American Indian and Alaska Native	48	0.4%
Asian	298	2.2%
Native Hawaiian and Other Pacific Islander	18	0.1%
Some other race	1,009	7.4%
Two or more races	1,955	14.4%
Hispanic or Latino (of any race)	3,226	23.7%

=== 2000 census ===
As of the 2000 census, there were 14,394 people, 5,267 households, and 4,034 families residing in the CDP. The population density was 1,610.9 people/km^{2} (4,172 people/mi^{2}). There were 5,414 housing units at an average density of 605.9 units/km^{2} (1,569 units/mi^{2}). The racial makeup of the CDP was 90.20% White; 2.56% African American; 0.29% Native American; 1.97% Asian; 0.06% Pacific Islander, 2.67% from other races; and 2.26% from two or more races. Hispanic or Latino of any race were 11.54% of the population.

There were 5,267 households, out of which 36.9% had children under the age of 18 living with them, 61.6% were married couples living together, 11.0% had a female householder with no husband present, and 23.4% were non-families. 17.2% of all households were made up of individuals, and 6.5% had someone living alone who was 65 years of age or older. The average household size was 2.73 and the average family size was 3.08.

In the CDP, the population was spread out, with 26.5% under the age of 18, 6.5% from 18 to 24, 30.9% from 25 to 44, 24.2% from 45 to 64, and 12.0% who were 65 years of age or older. The median age was 38 years. For every 100 females, there were 96.7 males. For every 100 females age 18 and over, there were 92.8 males.

The median income for a household in the CDP was $53,509, and the median income for a family was $59,205. Males had a median income of $40,510 versus $31,429 for females. The per capita income for the CDP was $23,538. About 4.1% of families and 5.0% of the population were below the poverty line, including 5.8% of those under age 18 and 5.2% of those age 65 or over.
