= Orlando Executive Airport =

Airport in Orange County, Florida

- Aerial photograph (2026)
- IATA: ORL; ICAO: KORL; FAA LID: ORL

Summary
- Airport type: Public
- Owner: Greater Orlando Aviation Authority
- Serves: Orlando, Florida
- Elevation AMSL: 113 ft (34 m)
- Coordinates: 28°32′44″N 081°19′59″W

Map
- Location of airport in Florida ORL (the United States)

Runways
| Direction | Length | | Surface |
| Direction | ft | m | Surface |
|---|---|---|---|
| 7/25 | 6,004 | 1,830 | Asphalt |
| 13/31 | 4,625 | 1,410 | Asphalt |

Statistics
- Aircraft operations (2020): 122,835
- Based aircraft (2022): 215
- Source: Federal Aviation Administration

Orlando Executive Airport (IATA: ORL, ICAO: KORL, FAA LID: ORL) is a public airport three miles (6 km) east of downtown Orlando, in Orange County, Florida. It is owned and operated by the Greater Orlando Aviation Authority (GOAA) and serves general aviation.

== Overview ==
Orlando Executive Airport is a general aviation and corporate aviation airport. Its proximity to the State Road 408 East-West Expressway and downtown Orlando makes it a popular airport. The airport is still the "minor" airport of Orlando, Florida, as Orlando International Airport is the airport for commercial airline flights, drawing more passengers every year.

The airport has been used for special air industry events and showcases including the National Business Aviation Association (NBAA) Convention which was held there in 2008, 2009, 2012, 2014, and 2022. Orlando Executive Airport served as the receiving site for the majority of Special Olympic Athletes during the largest non-military human airlift in the US.

The airport has also been used since the 1990s as a landing site and staging site by Marine Helicopter Squadron One (HMX-1) for Marine One and other supporting HMX-1 helicopter operations during Presidential visits to Orlando. All Presidential visits to the Orlando area are on Air Force One, which lands at Orlando International Airport (MCO).

== Facilities ==
Executive Airport covers 969 acres (392 ha) at an elevation of 113 feet (34 m). It has two asphalt runways: 7/25 is 6,004 by 150 feet (1,830 x 46 m) and 13/31 is 4,625 by 100 feet (1,410 x 30 m).

In the year ending December 31, 2020 the airport had 122,835 aircraft operations, an average of 337 per day: 95% general aviation, 5% air taxi and less than 1% military. In March 2022, there were 215 aircraft based at this airport: 132 single-engine, 42 multi-engine, 33 jet and 8 helicopter. The airport has two fixed-base operators (Atlantic Aviation and Sheltair Air Services), serves private and corporate aircraft and is the operating base for the Aviation Section of AdventHealth and the Orange County Sheriff's Office.

== History ==
Opened in 1928 as the Orlando Municipal Airport, the airport was the first commercial airport in central Florida. The United States Postal Service started airmail service to Orlando the following year.

=== Military use ===
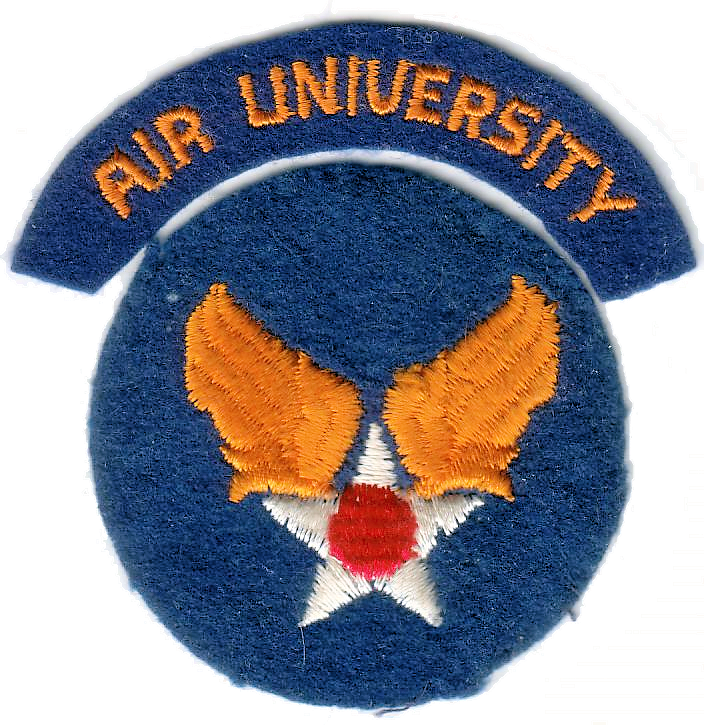
Emblem of Air University

The United States Army Air Corps took control of the airport in 1940 for use as a training facility and renamed it the Orlando Army Air Base. For the next six years, the airport remained under military control. In June 1941, the Army Air Corps became the United States Army Air Forces and beginning in late 1941 through mid-1943, Orlando Army Air Base was used by I Bomber Command and later by units of the Army Air Forces Antisubmarine Command (AAFAC) to fly antisubmarine patrols along both the east coast as well as over the Gulf of Mexico and the Florida Straits, augmenting U.S. Navy and U.S. Coast Guard aircraft in that capacity.

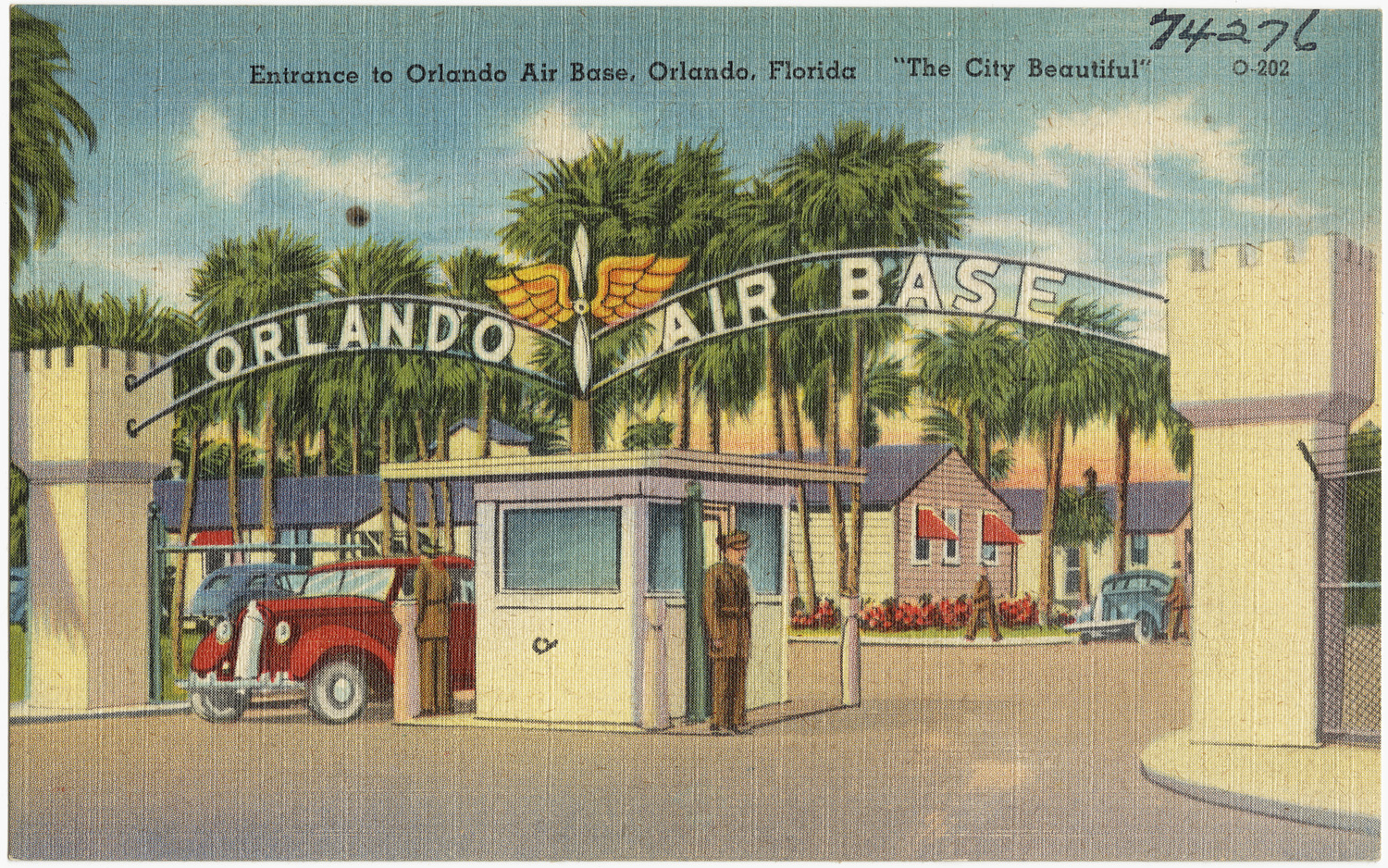
Entrance to Orlando Air Base as shown on a postcard.

With the lessening of the U-boat threat, Orlando AAB became the home of the Army Air Forces School of Applied Tactics (AAFSAT) and subsequently as the Army Air Forces Tactical Center (AAFTC).

In 1943 the AAFSAT began training units in night fighter operations. The 481st Night Fighter Group was established, equipped with the Douglas P-70, a variation of the A-20 Havoc attack aircraft used for training. Squadrons attached to the group in 1943 and 1944 were the 348th, 349th, 420th, 423d, 425th, 426th and 427th Night Fighter Squadrons, which, after completion of training, were sent overseas to either the Pacific or European Theaters for combat. In contrast, the Orlando Fighter Wing was stationed at the base.

In 1946 the airfield was released to the City of Orlando, while the military support facilities north and northeast of the airport remained under U.S. Army Air Forces control as a non-flying administrative and technical training installation still named Orlando Army Air Base. With the establishment of the United States Air Force as a separate service in 1947, this installation was renamed Orlando Air Force Base, serving as a technical training facility for the Air Training Command, a ground-launched tactical missile training facility for the Tactical Air Command, and as a headquarters installation for the Military Air Transport Service (later Military Airlift Command) and the Air Rescue Service. In 1968, Orlando AFB was transferred to the United States Navy and renamed Naval Training Center Orlando. This installation served as the newest of one of three Navy enlisted recruit training centers (boot camps) and as home to various technical training schools, to include the Naval Nuclear Power School for officer and enlisted personnel. The 1993 Base Realignment and Closure Commission directed that NTC Orlando be closed no later than 1 October 1999. The base property was sold to the City of Orlando, which in turn sold it to private developers. Most of the installation was demolished and residential and commercial properties developed on the site, renamed Baldwin Park.

=== Airline use ===
In 1946 passenger flights on National Airlines and Eastern Air Lines began at the now civil Orlando Municipal Airport. Five years later the airport built its main terminal, a two-story structure with a built-in control tower; this terminal building stood until late 1999. The April 1957 Official Airline Guide shows 20 weekday departures: 14 Eastern and 6 National. Eastern Air Lines had a nonstop flight to Atlanta; no other nonstops left the state. The nonstops to Washington that began in 1959 were probably the longest ORL ever had.

The August 1955 diagram shows Runway 17 4,480 ft (1,370 m) along the west side of the field, Runway 18 5,071 ft (1,546 m), Runway 4 5,422 ft (1,653 m), Runway 10R 5,313 ft (1,619 m) (still called 10R, though 10L was closed) and Runway 13 5,568 ft (1,697 m).

By the early 1960s development around the airport had made further expansion unlikely. The airport's 6000 foot main runway, Runway 7/25, wasn't long enough for early jet airliners such as the Boeing 707, Douglas DC-8 and Convair 880, so the city and Orange County governments lobbied the U.S. Air Force to convert McCoy Air Force Base, a Strategic Air Command B-52 base about eight miles to the south, to a civil-military airport with an airline terminal on undeveloped land on the east side of the base and military operations on the west side.

In 1961 the airport was renamed Herndon Airport after former Orlando city engineer "Pat" Herndon, the change being in preparation for commencing jet airline flights to the new Orlando Jetport at McCoy at McCoy AFB, known today as Orlando International Airport. In 1965 three airlines were serving Herndon Airport: Delta Air Lines, Eastern Air Lines and National Airlines. Delta flew Douglas DC-6 and Douglas DC-7 propliners on nonstop flights to Atlanta with direct service to Chicago. Eastern and National operated Lockheed L-188 Electra turboprops with National flying direct service to New York City, Boston, Washington D.C., Norfolk, Charleston, SC, Savannah, Jacksonville, FL and Miami, and Eastern operating nonstop and direct flights to Miami, Tampa, Jacksonville, FL and Tallahassee. Eastern Convair 440 prop aircraft also stopped at ORL with local service being flown to several destinations in Florida. By 1966, all three airlines had switched to operating their flights from the Orlando Jetport at McCoy, no longer serving Herndon.

=== Later developments ===
In 1976 the City of Orlando ceded control of the airport and transferred the property, its former City of Orlando Aviation Department, and all operational responsibilities to the newly established Greater Orlando Aviation Authority (GOAA), chartered by the Florida State Legislature to operate and manage all publicly owned airports in Orange County, Florida. GOAA renamed the airport Orlando Executive Airport in 1982, and in 1998 to its present name of Executive Airport.

In 1992, in cooperation with the City of Orlando, GOAA constructed Colonel Joe Kittinger Park in the southwest corner of the airport. Named in honor of noted local aviator, Colonel Joe Kittinger Jr., USAF (Ret) by the City of Orlando, the aviation-themed park overlooks the approach end of ORL's Runway 7. The park was temporarily closed in 2008 and partially demolished for an expansion project of the State Road 408 East-West Expressway, sacrificing part of the park's previous facilities and acreage for a storm water retention area. The park, albeit reduced in size, reopened in March 2011. In 2014, GOAA and City of Orlando officials approved inclusion in the park of a demilitarized F-4D Phantom II jet fighter on loan from the National Museum of the U.S. Air Force (NMUSAF). This aircraft arrived at ORL from Texas on July 22, 2014 and is on pylon-mounted static display at the park. The jet received from NMUSAF, AF Ser. No. 65-0747, was actually flown by Colonel Kittinger multiple times, including while based in Thailand during the Vietnam War and after the war while based in England.

== Accidents and incidents ==
- On October 1, 1960, an Eastern Air Lines Martin 4-0-4 on approach to ORL, when the right wing of the Martin clipped a Beechcraft Bonanza. The Martin landed safely with no injuries, but the Beech crashed and the pilot was killed.
- On November 29, 1967, a Learjet 23 operated by Jet International crashed on approach to ORL during an emergency landing, 7/10 of a mile SW of the airport because of fuel transfer problems and stalled and entered a spin on a go-around, crashing into a private home. All 3 occupants died.
- On September 1, 2022, a Diamond DA-42NG Twin Star, N43RG, was holding position short of runway 07 when a microburst occurred over the airport. The resulting strong winds flipped the aircraft, killing one individual and injuring the flight instructor.

== See also ==
- List of airports in Florida
