= Greater Orlando Aviation Authority =

Airport operator

Agency overview
- Formed: 1975
- Preceding agency: City of Orlando Aviation Department
- Jurisdiction: Orange County, Florida
- Headquarters: Orlando, Florida
- Employees: 800
- Agency executives: Lance Lyttle, Chief Executive Officer; Stephanie Kopelousos, Chair
- Website: flymco.com/airport-business

The Greater Orlando Aviation Authority (GOAA) is the governmental entity that operates Orlando International Airport (FAA ID: MCO) and Orlando Executive Airport (FAA ID: ORL) in Orlando, Florida.

GOAA replaced the former City of Orlando Aviation Department in 1976 following the closure of McCoy Air Force Base and its conveyance from the U.S. Air Force to the General Services Administration to the City of Orlando, and its subsequent transition to Orlando International Airport. GOAA is tasked with the operation, maintenance and administration of all public airports in Orange County, Florida, including any public airports which may be built in Orange County in the future.

== Structure ==
=== Leadership ===
The aviation authority consists of a full-time professional staff under the leadership of an appointed Executive Director and a non-paid seven-member board consisting of the mayor of the city of Orlando, Florida; the mayor of Orange County, Florida; and five other members who are personally interviewed and appointed by the governor of the state of Florida and who are subject to confirmation of the Florida Senate. The board's current chair is Stephanie Kopelousos, and the current vice-chair is Joe Nunziata.

=== Staff ===
The full-time GOAA staff is divided into four general categories:

(1) unionized employees, primarily in the building and maintenance trades;

(2) firefighters and paramedics of the international airport's Aircraft Rescue and Fire Fighting (ARFF) Division, who fall under an employment/retirement model similar to other fire rescue personnel in the State of Florida;

- NOTE 1: ARFF functions for Orlando Executive Airport are delegated to a station of the Orlando Fire Department (OFD) located on that airport's property. ARFF-specific crash vehicles are provided to OFD by GOAA.
- NOTE 2: GOAA has no organic "airport police" organization. Local law enforcement operations for GOAA are sub-tasked to the Airport Division of the Orlando Police Department, commanded by an OPD Captain, with equipage for the division (e.g., office space, vehicles, etc.) provided/subsidized by GOAA pursuant to OPD standards.

(3) non-unionized GOAA staff members (hourly and salaried) who are de facto civil service personnel spread across multiple occupational and professional categories in thirteen pay levels up to and including supervisors, managers and assistant directors; and

(4) appointed directors, senior directors, deputy executive directors and the executive director, the former serving at the pleasure of the executive director and the executive director serving at the pleasure of the GOAA Board. The current Chief Executive Officer is Lance Lyttle.
