= 1961 in baseball =

The following are the baseball events of the year 1961 throughout the world.

== Headline event of the year ==
- Roger Maris hits 61 home runs, breaking Babe Ruth's record.

== Champions ==
=== Major League Baseball ===
- World Series: New York Yankees over Cincinnati Reds (4–1); Whitey Ford, MVP
- All-Star Game (#1), July 11 at Candlestick Park: National League, 5–4 (10 innings)
- All-Star Game (#2), July 31 at Fenway Park: 1–1 tie (9 innings, rain)

=== Other champions ===
- College World Series: USC
- Japan Series: Yomiuri Giants over Nankai Hawks (4–2)
- Little League World Series: Northern, El Cajon, California
- Senior League World Series: Natrona Heights, Pennsylvania

== Awards and honors ==
- Baseball Hall of Fame
  - Max Carey
  - Billy Hamilton

Baseball Writers' Association of America Awards
BBWAA Award	National League	American League
Rookie of the Year	Billy Williams (CHC)	Don Schwall (BOS)
Cy Young Award	—	Whitey Ford (NYY)
Most Valuable Player	Frank Robinson (CIN)	Roger Maris (NYY)
Gold Glove Awards
Position	National League	American League
Pitcher	Bobby Shantz (PIT)	Frank Lary (DET)
Catcher	John Roseboro (LAD)	Earl Battey (MIN)
1st Base	Bill White (STL)	Vic Power (CLE)
2nd Base	Bill Mazeroski (PIT)	Bobby Richardson (NYY)
3rd Base	Ken Boyer (STL)	Brooks Robinson (BAL)
Shortstop	Maury Wills (LAD)	Luis Aparicio (CWS)
Outfield	Vada Pinson (CIN)	Jim Landis (CWS)
Outfield	Roberto Clemente (PIT)	Al Kaline (DET)
Outfield	Willie Mays (SF)	Jimmy Piersall (CLE)

== Statistical leaders ==
Hall of Famer Sandy Koufax

	American League		National League	
Stat	Player	Total	Player	Total
AVG	Norm Cash (DET)	.361	Roberto Clemente (PIT)	.351
HR	Roger Maris (NYY)	61	Orlando Cepeda (SF)	46
RBI	Jim Gentile (BAL); Roger Maris (NYY)	141	Orlando Cepeda (SF)	142
W	Whitey Ford (NYY)	25	Joey Jay (CIN); Warren Spahn (MIL)	21
ERA	Dick Donovan (WAS)	2.40	Warren Spahn (MIL)	3.02
K	Camilo Pascual (MIN)	221	Sandy Koufax (LAD)	269

== Major league baseball final standings ==
=== American League final standings ===
American League
Team	W	L	Pct.	GB	Home	Road
New York Yankees	109	53	.673	—	65‍–‍16	44‍–‍37
Detroit Tigers	101	61	.623	8	50‍–‍31	51‍–‍30
Baltimore Orioles	95	67	.586	14	48‍–‍33	47‍–‍34
Chicago White Sox	86	76	.531	23	53‍–‍28	33‍–‍48
Cleveland Indians	78	83	.484	30½	40‍–‍41	38‍–‍42
Boston Red Sox	76	86	.469	33	50‍–‍31	26‍–‍55
Minnesota Twins	70	90	.438	38	36‍–‍44	34‍–‍46
Los Angeles Angels	70	91	.435	38½	46‍–‍36	24‍–‍55
Kansas City Athletics	61	100	.379	47½	33‍–‍47	28‍–‍53
Washington Senators	61	100	.379	47½	33‍–‍46	28‍–‍54

Locations of teams for the 1961 American League season
American League

=== National League final standings ===
National League
Team	W	L	Pct.	GB	Home	Road
Cincinnati Reds	93	61	.604	—	47‍–‍30	46‍–‍31
Los Angeles Dodgers	89	65	.578	4	45‍–‍32	44‍–‍33
San Francisco Giants	85	69	.552	8	45‍–‍32	40‍–‍37
Milwaukee Braves	83	71	.539	10	45‍–‍32	38‍–‍39
St. Louis Cardinals	80	74	.519	13	48‍–‍29	32‍–‍45
Pittsburgh Pirates	75	79	.487	18	38‍–‍39	37‍–‍40
Chicago Cubs	64	90	.416	29	40‍–‍37	24‍–‍53
Philadelphia Phillies	47	107	.305	46	22‍–‍55	25‍–‍52

Locations of teams for the 1960–1961 National League seasons
National League

== Nippon Professional Baseball final standings ==
=== Central League final standings ===
Central League	G	W	L	T	Pct.	GB
Yomiuri Giants	130	71	53	6	.569	—
Chunichi Dragons	130	72	56	2	.562	1.0
Kokutetsu Swallows	130	67	60	3	.527	5.5
Hanshin Tigers	130	60	67	3	.473	12.5
Hiroshima Carp	130	58	67	5	.465	13.5
Taiyo Whales	130	50	75	5	.404	21.5

=== Pacific League final standings ===
Pacific League	G	W	L	T	Pct.	GB
Nankai Hawks	140	85	49	6	.629	—
Toei Flyers	140	83	52	5	.611	2.5
Nishitetsu Lions	140	81	56	3	.589	5.5
Daimai Orions	140	72	66	2	.521	15.0
Hankyu Braves	140	53	84	3	.389	33.5
Kintetsu Buffaloes	140	36	103	1	.261	51.5

== Events ==
=== January ===
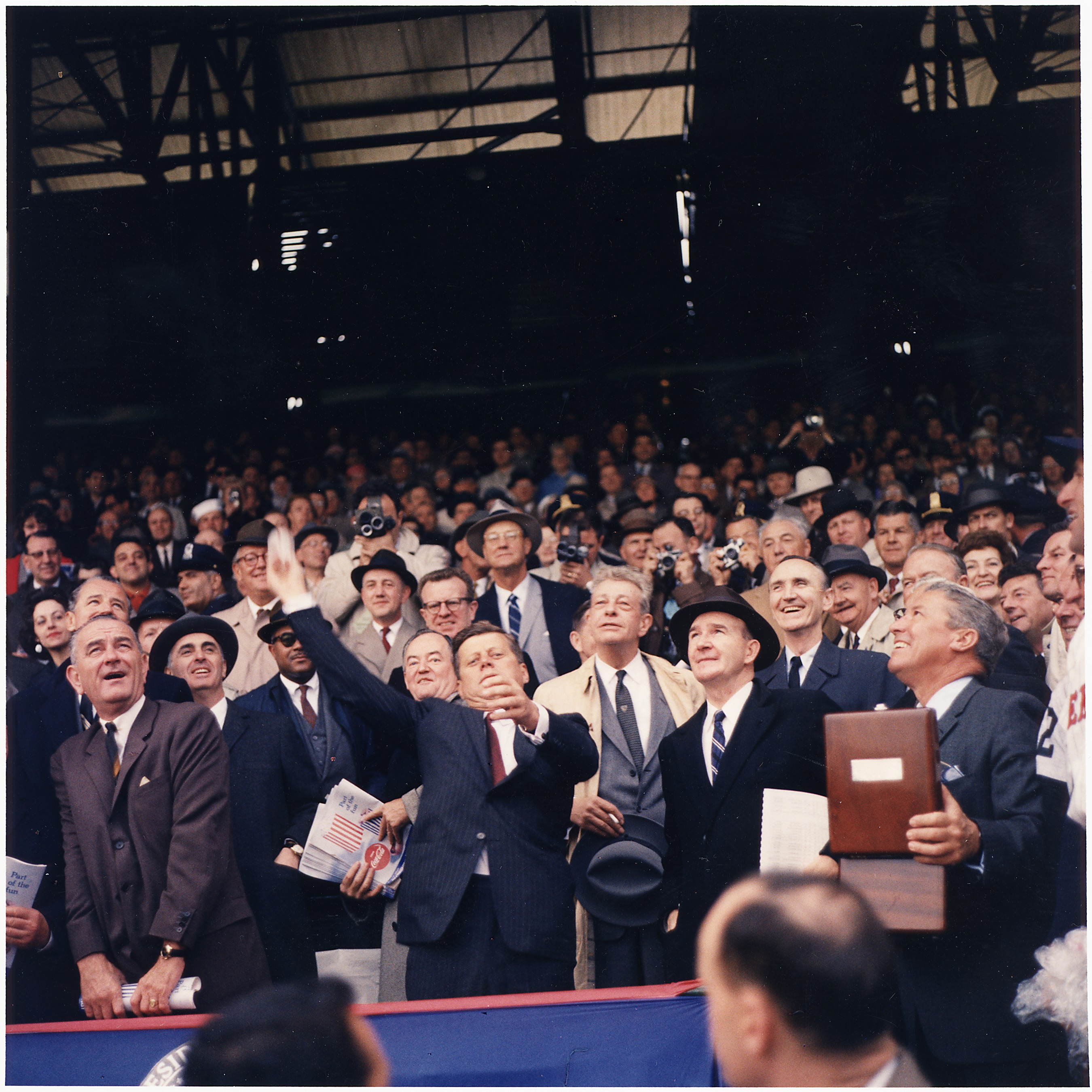
President John F. Kennedy throws out first ball in Washington, D.C. at Griffith Stadium on April 10, 1961

- January 3 – "Frantic" Frank Lane steps down as general manager of the Cleveland Indians to sign an eight-year contract to assume a similar position with the Kansas City Athletics, working under the club's new owner, Charles O. Finley. Within eight months, Finley will fire Lane.
- January 19 – The Cleveland Indians release pitcher Don Newcombe, 1956 National League Most Valuable Player and MLB Cy Young Award winner during his heyday with the Brooklyn Dodgers. Newcombe finishes with a 153–96 (3.57 ERA) career mark, and three seasons of 20 or more victories.
- January 24 – Frank Lane, known for constantly shaking up his roster, makes his first deal as GM of the Kansas City Athletics, sending outfielders Whitey Herzog and Russ Snyder to the Baltimore Orioles for rookie left-hander Jim Archer, catcher Clint Courtney, first baseman Bob Boyd, shortstop Wayne Causey and outfielder Al Pilarcik. Courtney will appear in one game for Kansas City on April 15 (as a pinch hitter) before the Athletics ship him back to Baltimore later that day.
- January 25 – In a waiver deal, the Cincinnati Reds trade stalwart southpaw Joe Nuxhall to Lane's Athletics for right-handers John Briggs and John Tsitouris. Nuxhall first pitched for the Reds at age 15 on June 10, 1944, becoming the youngest man ever to play Major League Baseball. After eight years in the minors, he rejoined the Reds in 1952 and made two NL All-Star teams (1955, 1956). He will return to Cincinnati in late July 1962 as an effective pitcher, then popular radio broadcaster, and member of the Reds' Hall of Fame.
- January 28 – After a five-year absence, Syracuse rejoins the International League. Taking on its longtime nickname, the "Chiefs" franchise affiliates with the Minnesota Twins and replaces the Montreal Royals, whose departure leaves the Québec metropolis without professional baseball for the next eight seasons.
- January 29 – Billy Hamilton and Max Carey are voted into the Hall of Fame by the Veterans Committee.

=== February ===
- February 1 – The Los Angeles Dodgers sell the contract of outfielder Chuck Essegian, record-setting pinch hitter and one of the stars of the club's 1959 World Series championship, to the Baltimore Orioles.
- February 7 – Boston Red Sox outfielder Jackie Jensen makes a return to the major leagues by signing a $40,000 contract. Jensen had retired in 1960 due to a fear of flying. Jensen will hit .263 with 13 home runs in 1961.
- February 15 – The inaugural Interamerican Series concludes in Caracas with the Industriales de Valencia crowned its first champion. The Industriales are one of two teams representing Venezuela; the other, the Rapiños de Occidente, finish second. The other two contestants represent Panama and Puerto Rico. The Interamerican Series is intended to replace the Caribbean Series of 1949–1960, which collapsed in the aftermath of the Cuban Revolution of 1959.

=== March ===
- March – The Cuban government, led by Fidel Castro, abolishes professional baseball (and all professional sports), ending the Cuban League, which was founded in 1878; the Serie Nacional de Béisbol is established to take its place.
- March 6 – The New York Metropolitan Baseball Club Inc. formally receives a certificate of membership from National League president Warren Giles. Eight days later, the newborn franchise appoints George Weiss, 66, as club president. Future Hall of Famer Weiss is coming off 29 years with the rival New York Yankees, who won 15 World Series during Weiss's long term as their farm system director, then general manager. Speculation immediately begins that Weiss will hire Casey Stengel, who managed his Bombers for 12 seasons, ten pennants and seven World Series titles, as the team's maiden pilot.
- March 15 – The St. Louis Cardinals welcome the return of free-agent second baseman Red Schoendienst, who had been released by the Milwaukee Braves on October 14, 1960. The future Hall of Famer, now 38, played 11½ seasons for the Cardinals before being traded away on June 14, 1956; he'll appear in 72 games during the coming season, largely as a pinch hitter, and bat an even .300.
- March 31 – The Chicago Cubs trade two pitchers, Moe Drabowsky and Seth Morehead, to the Milwaukee Braves for two infielders, Daryl Robertson and Andre Rodgers. Drabowsky, a 25-year old, Polish-born "bonus baby," went 32–41 (4.02 ERA) in five years as a Cub; he will become best known as a Baltimore Orioles reliever whose shutdown performance (62/3 shutout innings pitched, one hit allowed, 11 strikeouts) against the Los Angeles Dodgers in Game 1 kicks off the Orioles' four-game sweep of the 1966 World Series.

=== April ===
- April 4 – The New York Yankees acquire pitcher Duke Maas from the first-year expansion Los Angeles Angels in exchange for shortstop Fritz Brickell.
- April 10 — In the traditional "Presidential Opener" in Washington, D.C., the Chicago White Sox defeat the "new" Washington Senators, 4–3, with John F. Kennedy throwing out the first pitch and a crowd of 26,725 looking on. The Senators are an expansion team created expressly to replace the original Senator franchise that moved to Minneapolis–Saint Paul over the winter as the Minnesota Twins. The 1961 season is the first of the expansion era, and this Presidential Opener is the last in the history of Griffith Stadium, Washington's venerable baseball park.
- April 11
  - At Fenway Park, Boston Red Sox rookie Carl Yastrzemski singles off Ray Herbert of the Kansas City Athletics in his first MLB at bat. It's the first of 3,318 hits that Yastrzemski, 21, will amass over his illustrious 23-year career. The Red Sox commit four errors in the field and lose, 5–2, before only 10,277 fans.
  - The Los Angeles Angels play the first game in franchise history, defeating the Baltimore Orioles, 7–2, at Memorial Stadium. For the Angels, Ted Kluszewski hits two home runs while Eli Grba pitches a complete game.
  - At Yankee Stadium, the Minnesota Twins shut out the New York Yankees, 6–0, in their first game since their move from Washington, D.C. Pedro Ramos is the winning pitcher, helping himself with a two-run single while allowing just three singles in beating Yankees starter Whitey Ford.
  - Philadelphia Phillies pitcher Robin Roberts ties Grover Cleveland Alexander's National League record with a 12th-straight Opening Day start‚ but Philadelphia loses 6–2 to Don Drysdale and the Los Angeles Dodgers. Roberts is now 5–6 on Opening Day.
  - The Chicago Cubs play their first National League game of the experimental "College of Coaches" era and are defeated by the Cincinnati Reds, 7–1, at Crosley Field. Vedie Himsl serves as the Cubs' first-ever "head coach." Three other coaches will rotate as the Cubs' de facto manager in 1961—Himsl and El Tappe each will have three stints in the post—and the team will finish seventh in the eight-team Senior Circuit.
- April 12 – The Baltimore Orioles acquire pitcher Dick Hall and outfielder Dick Williams from the Kansas City Athletics for former "kiddie corps" pitcher Jerry Walker, 22, and outfielder Chuck Essegian.

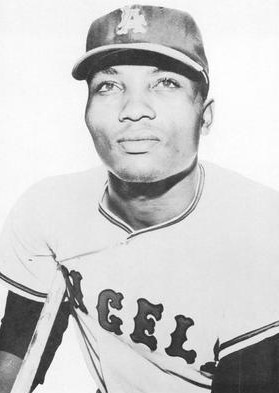
Leon Wagner in 1963

- April 13 – The fledgling Los Angeles Angels trade outfielder Lou Johnson to the Triple-A Toronto Maple Leafs of the International League for fellow-outfielder Leon Wagner. It's a career-saving trade for "Daddy Wags," who will slug 188 home runs for the Angels and Cleveland Indians through June 13, 1968, and make two American League All-Star teams.
- April 14 – At Tiger Stadium, Frank Lary of the Detroit Tigers fires a one-hitter in a 7–0 victory over the Chicago White Sox. Jim Landis' infield single in the fifth inning is the lone safety that Lary permits. Lary's is the first of nine one-hitters in the majors during 1961.
- April 16 – Feisty Leo Durocher marks his return to baseball by getting the heave-ho from umpire Jocko Conlan in a wild argument over a foul ball call. During the dispute, Durocher kicks dirt on Conlan, who retaliates by kicking Durocher in the shin, who then kicks the umpire back—an act which earns Durocher a three-game suspension. It's his first ejection since joining the Los Angeles Dodgers as a coach on the staff of manager Walter Alston before the season. He had been out of uniform since quitting as skipper of the New York Giants in September 1955.
- April 20 – Durable, nine-time NL All-Star and 3x Gold-Glove-winning catcher Del Crandall of the Milwaukee Braves leaves today's game against the Philadelphia Phillies after only five innings in favor of backup receiver Charley Lau. Crandall, 31—who started 139 of the Braves' 154 games in 1960 and has caught an average of 1,060 innings a year since 1953—is suffering from a bad throwing shoulder and has caught his last game for the 1961 Braves. Crandall will bounce back with an All-Star season in 1962, but his absence this year will impair the Braves' pennant chances only five games into the new campaign.
- April 21 – The Minnesota Twins play their first-ever home game, losing to the team that coincidentally replaced them in the nation's capital, the expansion Washington Senators, 5–3. A gathering of 24,606 witnesses the game at Metropolitan Stadium in suburban Bloomington.
- April 22 – The Boston Red Sox snap a 13-game losing streak at Comiskey Park by edging the Chicago White Sox 7–6 on Pumpsie Green's 11th-inning home run.
- April 23 – Art Mahaffey of the Philadelphia Phillies fans 17 Chicago Cubs in a four-hit, 6–0 shutout win at Connie Mack Stadium. Among the Cubs who strike out three times against Mahaffey are future Hall of Famers Ernie Banks and Ron Santo. Bill Monbouquette of the Boston Red Sox will duplicate Mahaffey's feat May 12 against the Washington Senators.
- April 25 – The Kansas City Athletics sign infielder Bert Campaneris as an amateur free agent.
- April 26 – Mickey Mantle blasts his sixth and seventh home runs of 1961—and Roger Maris hits his first—in the New York Yankees' ten-inning, 13–11 victory over the Detroit Tigers at Tiger Stadium. The torrid Mantle and slow-starting Maris will engage in a record-setting, but friendly, home-run-hitting duel all season.
- April 27
  - The Los Angeles Angels draw a crowd of 11,931 for their maiden home opener against the Minnesota Twins at Los Angeles' Wrigley Field. Ty Cobb, in what will be his last appearance at a ball park, throws out the ceremonial first pitch. Minnesota starter Camilo Pascual spoils the proceedings by winning, 4–2, to send the Angels to their eighth loss in nine games.
  - The Cincinnati Reds trade veteran starting catcher Ed Bailey to the San Francisco Giants for catcher Bob Schmidt, infielder Don Blasingame and a player to be named later. Blasingame becomes Cincinnati's starting second baseman. Relief pitcher Sherman Jones becomes the "PTBNL" on May 13.
  - After spending only six months as general manager of Houston's National League expansion team, which won't debut until April 1962, Gabe Paul quits and takes a similar job with the Cleveland Indians of the American League. It's later revealed that serious differences with Houston co-owner Roy Hofheinz drove Paul to cut his ties with the Texas club.
- April 28 – Forty-year-old Warren Spahn, the Milwaukee Braves' future Hall-of-Fame left-hander, throws the second no-hitter of his long career to defeat the San Francisco Giants 1–0 at County Stadium. Spahn walks two and strikes out five. Hank Aaron drives in the game's only run.
- April 30 – San Francisco slugger Willie Mays becomes the ninth player to hit four home runs in a single game as the Giants—who belt eight homers as a team—beat the Braves, 14–4, at Milwaukee during the eventful weekend series.

=== May ===
- May 4 – The Los Angeles Dodgers add to their already-strong pitching staff by acquiring Turk Farrell (along with infielder Joe Koppe) from the Philadelphia Phillies for third baseman Charley Smith and outfielder Don Demeter.
- May 8
  - The New York Yankees trade away veteran relief pitcher Ryne Duren to the Los Angeles Angels, along with another reliever, Johnny James, and rookie outfielder Lee Thomas, for pitcher Tex Clevenger and outfielder Bob Cerv. Duren, who will battle alcoholism throughout his playing career, is one of the most intimidating pitchers of the day, throwing a blazing fastball, wearing thick eyeglasses, and often emphasizing his unpredictable control by firing warmup pitches far over his catcher's head.
  - New York's expansion National League club announces that the team nickname will be "Mets," a natural shortening of the corporate name ("New York Metropolitan Baseball Club, Inc.")
- May 9 – The Baltimore Orioles' Jim Gentile slugs a grand slam in both the first and second innings in a game against the Minnesota Twins, and finishes with nine RBI in the game.
- May 10 – Outfielder Wes Covington is acquired by the Chicago White Sox in a cash transaction. The former, career-long Milwaukee Brave will eventually appear for four MLB teams in 1961, when he's later traded to the Kansas City Athletics (June 10), then the Philadelphia Phillies (July 2).
- May 21 – Twenty-year-old prospect Joe Torre, just recalled from Triple-A Louisville, catches both ends of a doubleheader for the Milwaukee Braves at Crosley Field against the Cincinnati Reds. The hard-hitting Torre goes three-for-eight, including a home run and a double, as the Braves split. He'll take over Milwaukee's first-string catching job for 1961 (in the absence of the injured Del Crandall), and establish himself as a major-leaguer and eventual All-Star, batting champion, and MVP.
- May 30 – The Los Angeles Dodgers, in a virtual tie with the Cincinnati Reds and San Francisco Giants for first place in the National League, acquire veteran infielder Daryl Spencer from the St. Louis Cardinals for shortstop Bob Lillis and outfielder Carl Warwick.
- May 31 – Boston Red Sox reserve outfielder Carroll Hardy pinch-hits for rookie Carl Yastrzemski. On September 20, 1960, Hardy pinch hit for Ted Williams, making him the only player to go in for both future Hall of Famers. Hardy also hit his first major league home run pinch-hitting for Roger Maris when both were at Cleveland (May 18, 1958).

=== June ===
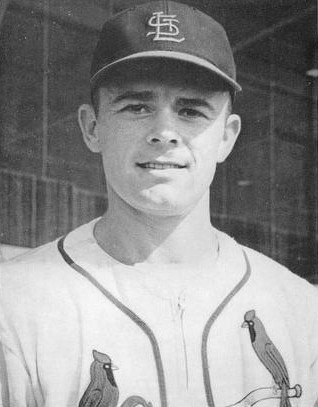
Hal Smith in 1957

- June 1 – The Minnesota Twins make two transactions. They purchase the contract of second baseman Billy Martin from the Milwaukee Braves, then trade third baseman Reno Bertoia, pitcher Paul Giel and a "PTBNL" to the Kansas City Athletics for centerfielder Bill Tuttle. Martin will immediately replace incumbent second-sacker Billy Gardner, and Tuttle becomes the Twins' regular third baseman in late June. Giel retires from baseball after one game pitched for Kansas City and is returned to Minnesota on June 10 as the PTBNL in his own trade.
- June 5 – Attempting to bolster their pitching staff, the Detroit Tigers make deals with the AL's expansion teams. Today, they obtain southpaw Hal Woodeshick from the Washington Senators for second baseman Chuck Cottier; two days later, the Tigers will exchange right-handers with the Los Angeles Angels, acquiring Jerry Casale for Jim Donahue.
- June 8
  - General manager Frank Lane continues to shake up his second-division Kansas City Athletics, trading first baseman Marv Throneberry to the Baltimore Orioles for outfielder Gene Stephens.
  - In the seventh inning of a 10–8 loss to the Cincinnati Reds at Crosley Field, the Milwaukee Braves become the first team to hit four home runs (by Eddie Mathews, Hank Aaron, Joe Adcock and Frank Thomas) in consecutive at bats.
- June 10
  - Hal Smith, 30, starting catcher of the St. Louis Cardinals and three-time All-Star, enters a St. Louis hospital complaining of chest and abdominal pain. When physicians diagnose a coronary artery condition, Smith is compelled to immediately end his playing career. He remains in the game as a minor-league manager, MLB coach and scout, and is able to briefly return to the field for the Pittsburgh Pirates in July 1965 on an emergency basis to appear in four games and catch 12 innings.
  - Frank Lane strikes again, trading pitchers Ray Herbert and Don Larsen, third baseman Andy Carey and outfielder Al Pilarcik from his Kansas City Athletics to the Chicago White Sox for pitchers Bob Shaw and Gerry Staley and outfielders Wes Covington and Stan Johnson.
- June 12
  - Citing poor health, Bill Veeck sells his controlling interest in the Chicago White Sox to brothers Arthur and John Allyn. Fourteen years later, in 1975, he will repurchase the team to keep it from moving to Seattle.
  - The Cleveland Indians sign 18-year-old pitcher Tommy John out of a Terre Haute, Indiana, high school.
- June 14
  - Yet another trade occurs involving the Kansas City Athletics, who send southpaw Bud Daley to the New York Yankees for right-hander Art Ditmar and hard-hitting third base prospect Deron Johnson.
  - The Minnesota Twins trade their former starting second baseman, Billy Gardner, to the Yankees for veteran left-hander Danny McDevitt.
- June 15
  - Former All-Star catcher Sammy White, who retired to run his Boston bowling alley rather than be traded to the Cleveland Indians in March 1960, un-retires when the Milwaukee Braves acquire his contract from the Boston Red Sox. White will hit only .219 in 62 games as a backup receiver for the Braves and Philadelphia Phillies before he retires for good in October 1962.
  - The Braves also bid adieu to longtime shortstop Johnny Logan, 35, dealing the former four-time NL All-Star to the Pittsburgh Pirates for outfielder Gino Cimoli.
- June 18
  - Kansas City Athletics' first-year owner Charles O. Finley fires his first manager, Joe Gordon, a Hall of Fame second baseman who piloted the Athletics to a 26–33 record. He's replaced by a player-manager, Hank Bauer, the club's 38-year-old right fielder.
  - Trailing the first-year expansion Washington Senators 12–5 going into the bottom of the ninth in the first game of a doubleheader at Fenway Park, the Boston Red Sox score eight runs after two men are out to steal a 13–12 victory from Washington. Catcher Jim Pagliaroni delivers the big blow, a grand slam home run that ties the score at twelve. To add insult to injury, Boston sweeps the twin bill with a 13-inning, 6–5 triumph in the nightcap, with Pagliaroni hitting the game-winning solo shot.
- June 20 – After releasing him as a player, the Pittsburgh Pirates appoint Gene Baker the player-manager of the Batavia Pirates of the New York-Penn League. The hiring is significant because Baker becomes the first African-American manager of a minor league team with a major league affiliate. Baker leads Batavia to a third-place finish, but they lose in the league finals to the Olean Red Sox.
- June 22 – The Los Angeles Angels obtain a future All-Star second baseman, Billy Moran, from independently operated Toronto of the Triple-A International League for pitcher Russ Heman and infielder Ken Hamlin.
- June 23
  - After granting him in a seven-game leave of absence earlier in June, the Minnesota Twins (25–41) dismiss manager Cookie Lavagetto. He has managed the team since May 7, 1957, when it was the American League's original Washington Senators. Owner Calvin Griffith names Sam Mele, a Twins coach, to replace Lavagetto.
  - Nine home runs are struck in a nine-inning game as the visiting Detroit Tigers maul the Cleveland Indians, 15–7.
- June 25
  - In a doubleheader at Cleveland Stadium between the Indians and Detroit Tigers, a brawl breaks out during the fifth inning of Game 1, touched off when Cleveland's Jimmy Piersall charges the mound after being hit by a pitch from Jim Bunning of the Tigers, the future Hall of Famer and U.S. Senator. Piersall and two teammates, Johnny Temple and Bob Hale, along with Detroit's Hank Aguirre, are ejected for fighting. Two innings later, Indians' manager Jimmy Dykes is also evicted by umpire Harry Schwarts as part of the beanball dispute. Although spiked by Piersall during the melee, Bunning stays in the game and claims a 6–3 victory.
  - In the nightcap of the same twin bill, Cleveland's Dykes and Temple are thrown out of their second game of the day, this time by Larry Napp, for arguing over a checked swing call. Despite the ejections, the Indians take the nightcap, 4–3, to earn a split on the afternoon.
- June 27 – Legendary executive Branch Rickey, 79, currently in retirement, suffers a heart attack at his summer cottage on Manitoulin Island in Lake Huron's Canadian waters; he's airlifted to a hospital in Sudbury, Ontario, where he's able to recover.
- June 29 – Willie Mays hits three home runs, helping the San Francisco Giants beat the Philadelphia Phillies 8–7.

=== July ===
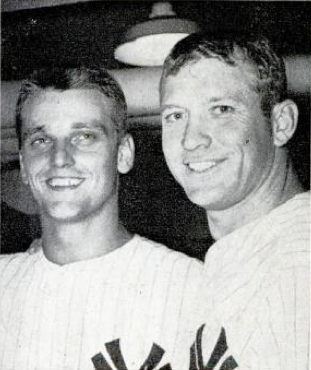
The Yankees' "M&M Boys": Maris and Mantle in 1961

- July 3 – Sandy Koufax is tagged out when attempting to steal home for the Los Angeles Dodgers against the Milwaukee Braves—the only time he will attempt to steal a base in his career.
- July 4
  - Willie Mays hits his 300th career home run off pitcher Jack Curtis, leading the San Francisco Giants to a 4–1 victory over the Chicago Cubs at Wrigley Field.
  - In the first game of an Independence Day double-header at Metropolitan Stadium, Minnesota Twins pinch-hitter Julio Bécquer hits the first recorded ever four-pitcher walk-off grand slam in Major League Baseball history. Chicago White Sox starter Billy Pierce, up 4–2 in the ninth inning en route to a complete game, allows a single to Bob Allison. Pierce is relieved by Russ Kemmerer, who allows another single to Earl Battey. Left-hander Frank Baumann then is brought in and he walks Lenny Green to load the bases. Afterwards, White Sox manager Al López summons Warren Hacker from the bullpen while Twins manager Sam Mele counters with Bécquer, who pulls the ball over the right field fence for the walk-off homer and a 6–4 victory.
  - In the second game of the double-header, Minnesota Twins slugger Harmon Killebrew hits a three-run home run, which will be the only inside-the-park home run of the 573 homers he will hit in his distinguished career.
  - The traditional midpoint of the MLB season sees the 49–29 Cincinnati Reds in the National League's top spot, two games ahead of the 47–31 Los Angeles Dodgers. The Reds, who finished sixth in 1960, are seeking their first NL pennant in 21 years. In the American League, another surprising contender, the Detroit Tigers (50–28–1), hold a one-game edge over the New York Yankees (48–28–1). Perhaps of equal interest, the Yankees' slugging outfielders Roger Maris (31) and Mickey Mantle (28) are bidding to equal or surpass Babe Ruth's single-season home run record of 60 long balls.
- July 5 – The tempestuous 2½-year reign of Solly Hemus as manager of the St. Louis Cardinals ends when he is replaced by third-base coach and former longtime minor-league skipper Johnny Keane. The fiery Hemus leaves with a 190–192 (.497) record, and 12 ejections. Keane will end up piloting the 1964 Cardinals to the club's seventh world championship.
- July 11 – Strong winds at Candlestick Park dominate the first All-Star Game of the season. A capacity crowd sees National League pitcher Stu Miller of the host San Francisco Giants blown off the mound in the ninth inning. His balk enables the American League to forge a 3–3 tie before it loses, 5–4, in ten innings.
- July 17 – Commissioner Ford Frick decrees that Babe Ruth's record of 60 home runs in a 154-game schedule in 1927 "cannot be broken unless some batter hits 61 or more within his club's first 154 games." Two days later, Frick, an old friend of Ruth, announces that should Ruth's record be beaten after 154 games, the record will carry an asterisk. When asked about the ruling, Roger Maris replies, "A season is a season."
- July 19 – All-time hits and batting average king Ty Cobb is laid to rest in Royston, Georgia, two days after his death from cancer at 74. The funereal gathering of 150 includes only three baseball people, two of whom are fellow Hall of Famers Mickey Cochrane and Ray Schalk.
- July 21
  - The Cincinnati Reds acquire right-hander Ken Johnson from the Triple-A Toronto Maple Leafs for hurler Orlando Peña and cash. Johnson, previously a dismal 6–15 (5.03) in 52 games for the 1958–1961 Kansas City Athletics, finds a new lease on life in the National League, winning six games down the stretch and helping the Reds win the pennant.
  - Player–manager Hank Bauer, playing right field and hitting sixth in the Kansas City Athletics' lineup, goes two for three and knocks in the winning run, as Kansas City defeats the visiting Detroit Tigers, 3–2. It will prove to be the 14-year veteran's final MLB game when he's dropped from the active roster July 26.
- July 25 – In the first game of a doubleheader in The Bronx, Roger Maris belts two home runs, Mickey Mantle hits one, and Whitey Ford improves to 18–2, in the New York Yankees' 5–1 triumph over the Chicago White Sox. Maris and Mantle are now tied with 38 home runs in their chase for Babe Ruth's single-season record. Then, in the nightcap, Maris slugs two more homers (numbers 39 and 40) to retake the AL long-ball lead, in the Yanks' 12–0 rout. With the Detroit Tigers falling to the Los Angeles Angels, the Yanks leapfrog the Tigers to assume a half-game lead in the pennant race.
- July 31 – At Fenway Park, the second All-Star Game of the year ends in a 1–1 tie as heavy rain halts play. It is the first tie in All-Star history; the other will occur in 2002.

=== August ===
- August 2
  - Sophomore pitcher Juan Marichal of the San Francisco Giants one-hits the Los Angeles Dodgers at the LA Coliseum. Tommy Davis' fifth-inning single is the Dodgers' only "knock." The Dodgers' 6–0 defeat, combined with the Cincinnati Reds' doubleheader sweep of the Philadelphia Phillies, puts Los Angeles (62–39) a full game behind Cincinnati (65–40) in the National League race.
  - The Detroit Tigers (64–38–1), now 1½ games off the pace in their pennant battle with the New York Yankees (65–36–1), obtain veteran relief pitcher Gerry Staley and infielder Reno Bertoia from the Kansas City Athletics for pitcher Bill Fischer and infielder Ozzie Virgil. Staley, 40, is coming off two stellar seasons as bullpen ace of the 1959–1960 Chicago White Sox; Bertoia returns to Detroit and team that first signed him as a teenaged "bonus baby" in 1953.
- August 3 – Smoky Burgess belts two home runs and collects six RBI, Dick Stuart homers once and knocks in five runs, and Roberto Clemente goes five-for-six and scores four times in the defending World Series champion Pittsburgh Pirates' 19–0 rout of the St. Louis Cardinals at Busch Stadium. It's one of the few highlights of the Bucs' disappointing 1961 season.
- August 6 – Mickey Mantle's 41st and 42nd homers of 1961 help his New York Yankees outlast the visiting Minnesota Twins 7–6 in 15 innings in the first game of a Sunday doubleheader. Mantle's 43rd blast of the season and two runs scored enable the Yanks to sweep by taking the nightcap, 3–2.
- August 10 – Loop president Warren Giles fires Frank Dascoli—recently voted best the umpire in the National League—after the arbiter reportedly calls Giles "gutless and spineless" for not sufficiently backing the league's officials. Dascoli, 45 and in his 14th season, never umpires another MLB game.
- August 11 – Warren Spahn of the Milwaukee Braves records his 300th career win, beating the Chicago Cubs 2–1 at County Stadium. Spahn also knocks in the game's first run with a sacrifice fly.

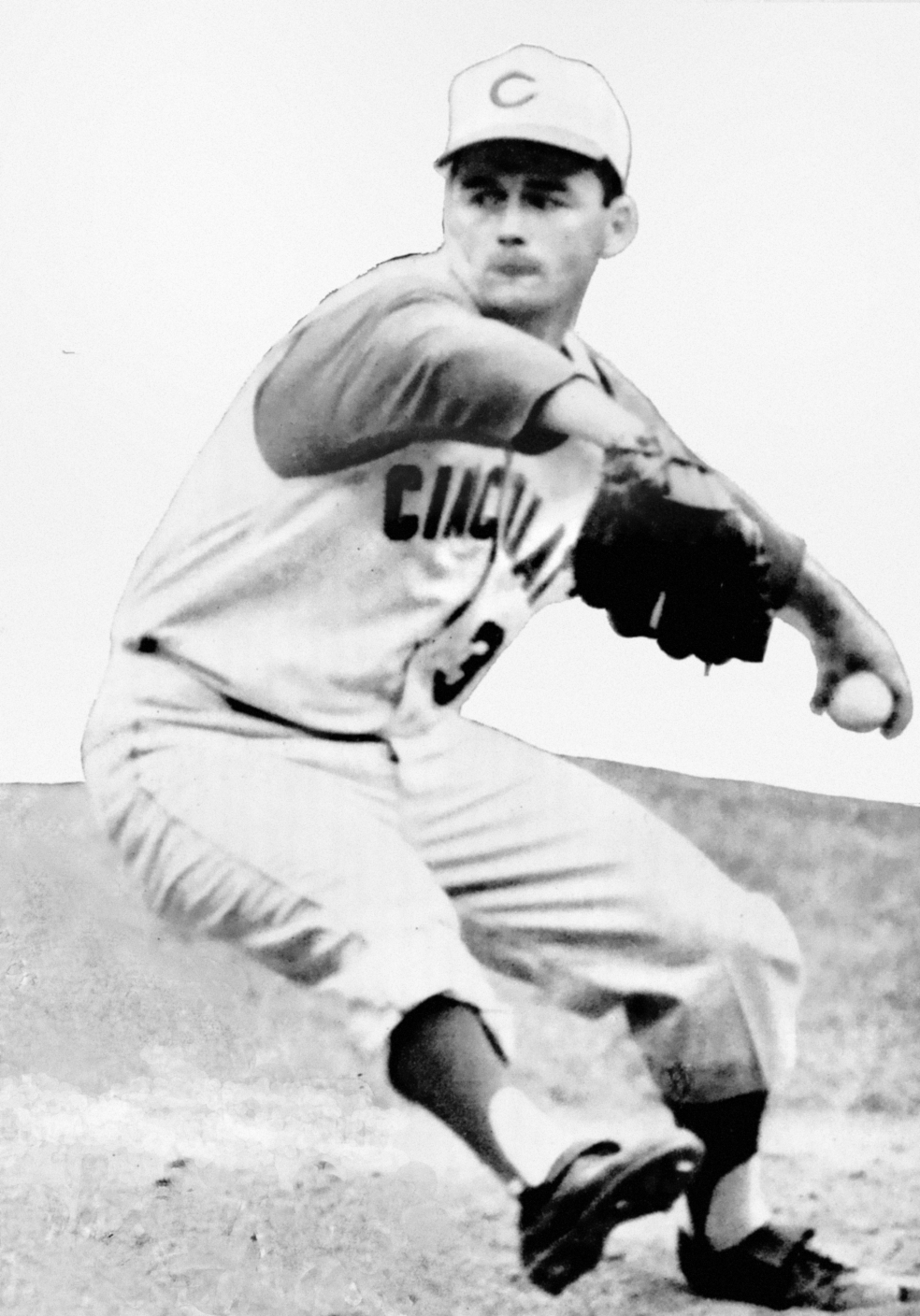
Jim O'Toole

- August 16 – In a Wednesday "twinight doubleheader" at Los Angeles Memorial Coliseum, the Cincinnati Reds' Bob Purkey and Jim O'Toole each throw complete-game shutouts to defeat the Dodgers, 6–0 and 8–0, and retake first place in the National League. Los Angeles had held the NL's top spot since August 8.
- August 20 – The Philadelphia Phillies snap a modern-day record 23-game losing streak, defeating the Milwaukee Braves 7–4 in the second game of a doubleheader at Milwaukee County Stadium. Phillie pitcher John Buzhardt goes the distance for the victory; he had also been the winning pitcher in the Phillies' last victory prior to the start of the losing streak, on July 28 against the San Francisco Giants.
- August 20 – Two Minnesota Twins pitchers homer off two Los Angeles Angels pitchers, to become the sixth (and last) pitching duo to homer in the same game. Starter Jack Kralick leads off the third inning with a homer off Jim Donohue, and Al Schroll hits a lead-off homer in the eighth off Art Fowler.
- August 21 – The Baltimore Orioles purchase the contract of catcher Charley Lau from the Milwaukee Braves.
- August 22
  - Roger Maris becomes the first player to hit his 50th home run of the season in the month of August as the Yankees lose to the Los Angeles Angels 4–3. Angels' pitcher Ken McBride tees up the gopher ball in the sixth inning with one on.
  - Less than nine months into his tenure as owner of the Kansas City Athletics, Charles O. Finley fires his hand-picked general manager, Frank Lane, with almost 7½ years left on Lane's eight-year contract. Finley names Pat Friday, a 36-year-old employee of his insurance firm, as Lane's successor; Friday has no baseball experience. Finley and Lane will fight each other in court for almost five years over Lane's severance pay. During his seven months as Kansas City's general manager, "Trader" Lane has lived up to his reputation, making 20 deals, not counting amateur free-agent signings.
- August 23 – At Crosley Field, the San Francisco Giants hit five home runs in a 12-run ninth inning, beating the host Cincinnati Reds, 14–0.
- August 24 – Ageless Satchel Paige signs with the Portland Beavers of the Pacific Coast League. in 25 innings for Portland, he will have a 2.88 ERA.
- August 26 – Hall of Fame first baseman Hank Greenberg steps down as general manager of the Chicago White Sox. He is succeeded by Ed Short, the ChiSox' publicity director.
- August 27 – In their second crucial doubleheader in 11 days—this time at Crosley Field—the Cincinnati Reds again sweep the Los Angeles Dodgers, 6–5 and 8–3. Cincinnati's lead in the NL swells to 3½ games.

=== September ===
- September 1
  - As a critical three-game series begins in New York, the Detroit Tigers sit 1½ games behind the first-place Yankees. After both clubs battle into the home half of the ninth of a scoreless tie, the Bombers string together three straight singles from Elston Howard, Yogi Berra and Bill Skowron and grab a 1–0 victory. The game starts two streaks: the Tigers lose eight games in a row, while the Yankees win 13 straight. The Yanks' lead balloons to 11½ games by September 12, and they clinch the American League pennant on the 20th.
  - Paul Richards resigns as manager of the Baltimore Orioles to become the general manager of the National League expansion team to be known as the Houston Colt .45s, which will debut in April 1962. Lum Harris finishes the year as manager of the Orioles.
- September 2 – Milwaukee Braves manager Chuck Dressen (71–58, fourth in the eight-team NL) is fired and executive vice president Birdie Tebbetts, who managed Cincinnati between 1954 and 1958, becomes the new Braves' pilot.
- September 4 – With Labor Day action completed, the Cincinnati Reds hold a two-game lead over the runner-up Los Angeles Dodgers in the National League. In the American League, the New York Yankees' lead over the Detroit Tigers stands at six games, while the race to surpass Babe Ruth's single-season home run mark sees Roger Maris holding a 53–50 advantage over Mickey Mantle.
- September 11 – The Houston Colt .45s sign outfielder Rusty Staub as an amateur free agent and give him a massive, for its time, $100,000 bonus. Staub, 17, had starred at New Orleans' Jesuit High School.
- September 12
  - Gaining revenge against their old team, Don Demeter smashes three home runs and Charley Smith hits one, to help their last-place Philadelphia Phillies out-slug the Los Angeles Dodgers, 19–10, at the Coliseum. The loss drops the Dodgers 4½ games behind the Cincinnati Reds. The losing pitcher, Sandy Koufax, is knocked out of the box in the second inning after allowing six earned runs and gaining only four outs.
  - The Chicago Cubs' "College of Coaches" experiment continues, as El Tappe takes over as rotating "head coach" for the third time in 1961. The head-coaching changeover is the Cubs' ninth of the regular season. Tappe's tenure lasts until the season ends and he compiles a 5–11 mark, capping off Chicago's 64–90, seventh-place campaign.
- September 14 – At Busch Stadium, the St. Louis Cardinals and the Chicago Cubs set a National League record by using 72 players in a double header. The Cardinals prevail with 37 players and sweep the twin bill, 8–7 in a regular nine-inning game and then 6–5 in 11 innings. St. Louis' Ken Boyer posts a 7-for-11 day, hitting for the cycle in the nightcap and completing it by belting a walk-off home run in the bottom of the 11th.
- September 16 – The first-year Washington Senators acquire former "bonus baby" left-hander Claude Osteen from the Cincinnati Reds for a PTBNL (veteran right-hander Dave Sisler). Osteen, 22, has run out of options with Cincinnati; in Washington, he'll eventually develop into a top-three starting pitcher who, after his trade to the Los Angeles Dodgers, makes three All-Star teams and wins 196 career games through 1975.
- September 20 – Helped by home runs by Yogi Berra and Roger Maris, the New York Yankees defeat the Baltimore Orioles 4–2, clinching their second straight American League pennant and 11th in 13 years. The Yankees will finish with a 109–53 record, tying the 1969 Orioles for the best won-loss record of the decade.
- September 22 – Harry Craft, one of four men to rotate as "head coach" during the Chicago Cubs' bizarre "College of Coaches" experiment in 1961, is named the first manager in the history of the Houston Colt .45s, who will begin play in the National League next season. Craft formerly helmed the 1957–1959 Kansas City Athletics. He will pilot the Colt .45s from 1962 until September 18, 1964.
- September 23 – In the New York Yankees' 8–3 triumph over the Boston Red Sox at Fenway Park, two future Hall-of-Famers, Whitey Ford and Mickey Mantle, reach personal bests, with Ford winning his 25th game and Mantle hitting his 54th home run of the 1961 campaign. It's Ford's first of two career 20+-win seasons, while the injury-plagued Mantle will hit no more four-baggers in 1961.
- September 26
  - The Cincinnati Reds clinch their first National League pennant since 1940. Home runs by outfielder Frank Robinson and pinch hitter Jerry Lynch (a tie breaker in the eighth inning) give the Reds an 8–3 win over the Chicago Cubs at Wrigley Field.
  - Roger Maris of the New York Yankees hits his major league record-tying 60th home run of the season, a third inning solo shot against Jack Fisher of the Baltimore Orioles.
- September 30 – The Cleveland Indians fire veteran manager Jimmy Dykes, 64, on the eve of the closing day of their 1961 season. The dismissal ends the colorful Dykes' managerial career, which began in 1934 with the Chicago White Sox and saw him helm six big-league clubs, five in the American League, over 21 seasons. He never won a pennant, and his teams compiled a 1,406–1,541 (.477) record. During the off-season, Mel McGaha, 35, is named Cleveland's skipper for 1962.

=== October ===
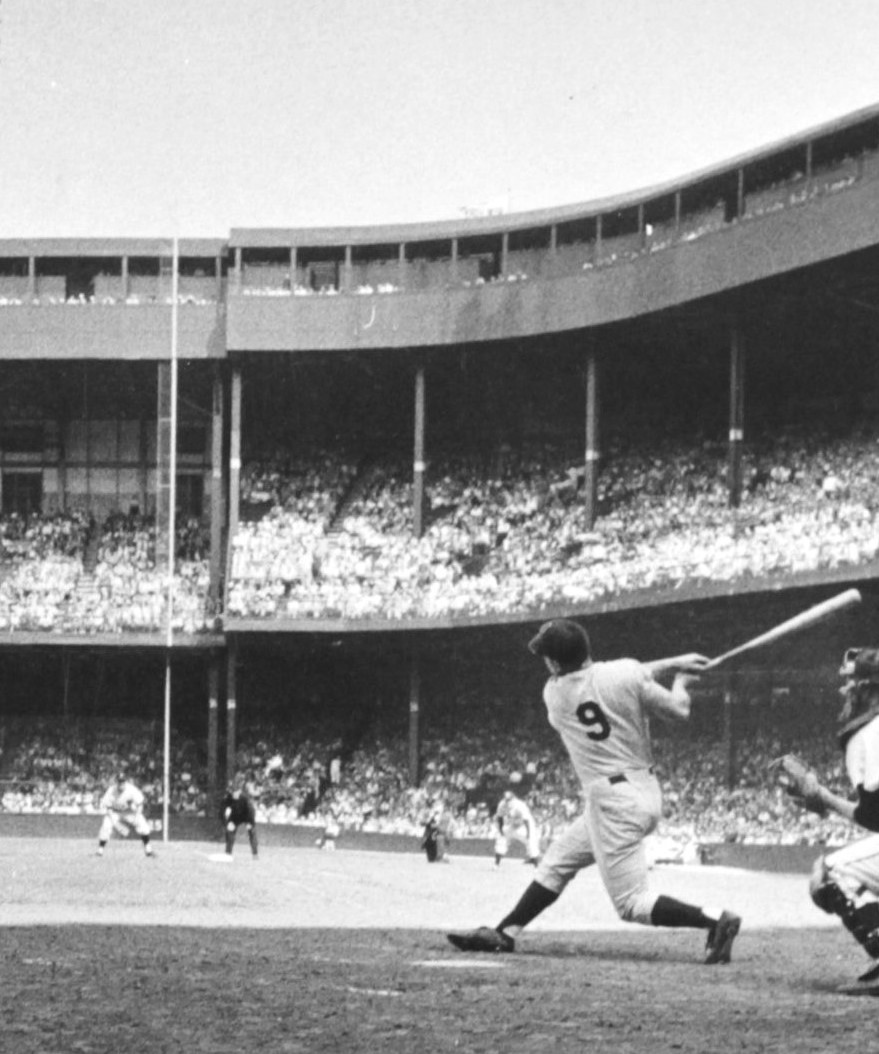
Roger Maris belts homer #58 (September 17, 1961 at Tiger Stadium)

- October 1 – Before a small home crowd at Yankee Stadium, Roger Maris smacks a 2–0 pitch into the right field stands for his 61st home run of the season—a record that will last until Mark McGwire breaks it in 1998. The historic homer, hit off rookie right-hander Tracy Stallard of the Boston Red Sox, is the Yankees' 240th, which sets a major league single-season record.
- October 2 – After spending 1961 in forced "retirement" from the New York Yankees—although he says he has turned down "five or six" overtures to take the helm of a big-league team in the past 12 months—Casey Stengel, 71, returns to baseball as the first manager of the New York Mets, an expansion team poised to enter the National League in 1962. "The Ol' Perfessor," who won ten American League pennants and seven World Series titles over his 12-year tenure (1949–1960) with the Yankees, becomes the only man to have played for or managed all four 20th century New York-based MLB franchises, and will be elected to the Baseball Hall of Fame in 1966.
- October 5 – Seeking to spark interest and attendance as they move into their new ballpark, District of Columbia Stadium, in 1962, the second-year Washington Senators acquire colorful centerfielder Jimmy Piersall from the Cleveland Indians for 1961 American League earned-run average king Dick Donovan, catcher/outfielder Gene Green and infielder Jim Mahoney. Piersall, 31, is a two-time All-Star who batted .322 in 1961 and won his second Gold Glove Award for defensive excellence. But, in 1962, Piersall struggles offensively and fails as a drawing card. Meanwhile, veteran pitcher Donovan wins 20 games for the Indians.
- October 8 – The 1961 World Series witnesses a New York Yankees star not named Maris or Mantle shatter another long-standing record set by Babe Ruth. By hurling a complete-game, two-hit shutout in Game 1 and another five scoreless frames today against the Cincinnati Reds, future Hall-of-Fame southpaw Whitey Ford breaks Ruth's mark of 292/3 consecutive scoreless innings pitched—set in 1918 when the 23-year-old "Bambino" was still a brilliant starting pitcher for the Boston Red Sox. Ford exits today's Game 4, 7–0 triumph with 32 straight shutout frames in Fall Classic play. His streak began when he twice blanked the Pittsburgh Pirates in the 1960 World Series, and will end in the second inning of Game 1 of the 1962 World Series after Ford sets down the first five San Francisco Giants before he permits a run.
- October 9 – In the decisive Game 5 of the World Series, Johnny Blanchard and Héctor López spark a five-run first inning and 13–5 win for the New York Yankees over the Cincinnati Reds and a four-games-to-one Series triumph. Blanchard and López hit home runs, and López drives in five runs. Bud Daley's long relief effort wraps up the Fall Classic, as Ralph Houk becomes the third rookie manager to guide a World Series winner. Whitey Ford is named the Series MVP.
- October 10
  - The first National League expansion draft stocks the rosters of the New York Mets and Houston Colt .45s, set to debut in 1962. Hobie Landrith is New York's first choice, and Eddie Bressoud is Houston's. Both are selected from the San Francisco Giants.
  - The Baltimore Orioles sign Billy Hitchcock, a 45-year-old former AL infielder, to a one-year contract as their new manager.
- October 11 – The Mets purchase left-hander Johnny Antonelli from the Milwaukee Braves. Antonelli is well-remembered from his time as ace of the 1954 world-champion New York Giants' pitching staff. But Antonelli, 31, decides to retire from the mound prior to the Mets' inaugural spring training camp.
- October 16
  - The Philadelphia Phillies sell the contract of six-time 20-game-winner, seven-time NL All-Star and future Hall-of-Famer Robin Roberts to the New York Yankees. Roberts, 35, has gone 234–199 (3.46 ERA) in a 529 games as a Phillie, but was only 1–10 (5.85) in 1961.
  - The New York Mets purchase the contracts of three players. One of them is former Brooklyn Dodgers pitcher Billy Loes, ironically acquired from the San Francisco Giants. However, in February 1962, Loes tells the Mets he can no longer pitch because of a sore arm and he's returned to the Giants, who release him on March 2, 1962.

=== November ===
- November 14 – Charles Hurth resigns as general manager of the New York Mets, a post he's held since April 1960 when the team—then without a name—was a member of the proposed Continental League. Hurth, 55, a former longtime minor-league executive related by marriage to the Branch Rickey family, had remained general manager after the franchise was formally admitted as an expansion team to the National League and hired George Weiss as president in March of this year. Hurth's duties will be absorbed by Weiss, assisted by front-office lieutenants Wid Matthews and Johnny Murphy.
- November 15 – Roger Maris wins his second consecutive American League Most Valuable Player Award, squeaking past his teammate Mickey Mantle by four votes.
- November 16
  - The Cleveland Indians deal veteran second baseman Johnny Temple, a member of the 1961 AL All-Star team, to the Baltimore Orioles for catcher Harry Chiti, first baseman Ray Barker and Artie Kay, a minor-league pitcher.
  - The logo of the New York Mets, designed by sports cartoonist Ray Gatto, is unveiled. The insignia, which is round with orange stitching, represents a baseball. A bridge in the foreground symbolizes that the Mets, in bringing back the National League to New York, represent all five boroughs. The skyline in the background includes a church spire, symbolic of Brooklyn, the Williamsburg Savings Bank, the Woolworth Building, the Empire State Building and the United Nations Building. The Mets' colors are Dodger blue and Giant orange, symbolic of the Senior Circuit's return to New York after the Dodgers and Giants moved to California four years earlier.
- November 22 – Frank Robinson becomes the first Cincinnati Reds player in 21 years to win the National League MVP Award, taking 219 of 224 possible votes.
- November 26
  - The Professional Baseball Rules Committee votes 8–1 against legalizing the spitball. Only American League supervisor of umpires Cal Hubbard votes in favor.
  - The Houston Colt .45s trade their first pick in October's expansion draft, Eddie Bressoud, to the Boston Red Sox for fellow shortstop Don Buddin.
- November 27
  - The Chicago White Sox again trade fan-favorite Minnie Miñoso, this time to the St. Louis Cardinals, in exchange for first baseman/outfielder Joe Cunningham.
  - Lefthander Bo Belinsky is one of 19 players taken in the Rule 5 draft. Selected by the Los Angeles Angels from the Baltimore Orioles, Belinsky will make headlines in 1962—on the field by throwing a no-hitter, and off the field with his freewheeling, bachelor lifestyle.
- November 28
  - The Chicago White Sox trade veteran first baseman Roy Sievers, a former American League home-run champion, to the Philadelphia Phillies for pitcher John Buzhardt and third baseman Charley Smith.
  - The New York Mets acquire hard-hitting outfielder Frank Thomas from the Milwaukee Braves for a "player to be named later" (former All-Star outfielder Gus Bell, who will not be added to the deal until May 22, 1962). Thomas will lead the hapless 1962 Mets in home runs (34) and runs batted in (94).

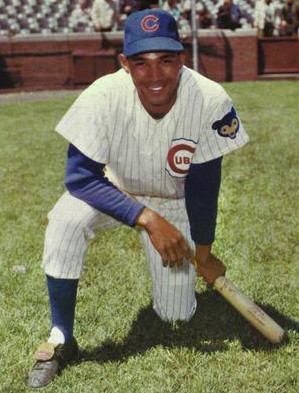
Billy Williams in 1969

- November 30
  - Chicago Cubs outfielder Billy Williams, who hit .278 with 25 home runs and 86 RBI, is selected as the National League Rookie of the Year. Catcher Joe Torre of the Milwaukee Braves (.278, 10, 42) and Cubs pitcher Jack Curtis (10 wins, 4.89 ERA) also receive consideration for the honor.
  - The San Francisco Giants strengthen their mound staff by acquiring two veteran pitchers, southpaw Billy Pierce and right-hander Don Larsen, from the Chicago White Sox for four players, one of whom is knuckleball hurler Eddie Fisher. Pierce will be instrumental in the Giants' 1962 National League pennant drive by winning 16 games, including the opening game of the three-game tie-breaker against the Los Angeles Dodgers; Larsen, now a reliever, will face his old team, the New York Yankees, in the 1962 World Series, and defeat them in Game 4.

=== December ===
- December 1 – Right-hander Don Schwall, who won 15 games for the second-division Boston Red Sox, is named American League Rookie of the Year by the BBWAA. The Sporting News names Kansas City Athletics shortstop Dick Howser, the future manager, its AL "Rookie Player of the Year," with Schwall winning "Rookie Pitcher of the Year" honors.
- December 2 – MLB clubs vote to curb bonuses. All first-year players not on major-league rosters, except one minor leaguer, can be drafted by any other club for $8,000. Clubs are expected to be unwilling to pay large bonuses for players who will be subject to a draft for just $8,000.
- December 8 – The fledgling New York Mets purchase the contract of future Hall-of-Fame centerfielder Richie Ashburn from the Chicago Cubs. In 1962, Ashburn, 35, will bat .306 in 135 games as a Met during his final MLB season.
- December 15
  - The Milwaukee Braves acquire starting pitcher Bob Shaw and infielder Lou Klimchock from the Kansas City Athletics for catcher Joe Azcue, third baseman Ed Charles and outfielder Manny Jiménez.
  - The New York Mets acquire second baseman Charlie Neal and pitcher Willard Hunter (PTBNL) from the Los Angeles Dodgers for outfielder Lee Walls and $100,000. Neal is a former Brooklyn Dodger who later starred in the 1959 World Series.
  - Chuck Comiskey, 35, sells his 46% share of the team his grandfather founded, the Chicago White Sox, to an 11-member investment group including insurance magnate William Bartholomay and entertainer Danny Thomas for $3.3 million. The transaction ends the Comiskey family's 60+-year connection with the franchise.

== Births ==
=== January ===
- January 3 – John Leister
- January 5
  - Henry Cotto
  - John Russell
  - Roger Samuels
- January 12 – Casey Candaele
- January 14 – Joe Redfield
- January 15 – Jody Lansford
- January 18 – John Bohnet
- January 19 – Ken Dowell
- January 24 – Tim Barrett
- January 29 – Mike Aldrete

=== February ===
- February 2 – Michael Kay
- February 3 – Freddie Toliver
- February 9 – John Kruk
- February 11 – Steve Springer
- February 15 – Mark Davidson
- February 21 – Joel Skinner
- February 23
  - John Morris
  - Mike Smith
- February 25 – Dana Kiecker

=== March ===
- March 3 – Ron Wotus
- March 5 – Steve Ontiveros
- March 8 – Mark Salas
- March 10 – Mike Birkbeck
- March 11 – Bryan Oelkers
- March 24 – Al Chambers
- March 26
  - Mike Warren
  - Mickey Weston
- March 28 – Glenn Davis
- March 29 – Mike Kingery
- March 31 – Tracy Jones

=== April ===
- April 3
  - Doug Baker
  - Tim Crews
- April 4 – Brad Komminsk
- April 9
  - Brian Dorsett
  - Kirk McCaskill
- April 14 – Jay Aldrich
- April 19 – Spike Owen
- April 20 – Don Mattingly
- April 22 – Jimmy Key
- April 26 – Curtis Wilkerson
- April 27 – Ray Hayward
- April 29
  - Wes Gardner
  - Louie Meadows
- April 30 – Tony Mack

=== May ===
- May 3 – Bob Buchanan
- May 7 – Manny Hernández
- May 19 – Ken Gerhart
- May 20 – Ralph Bryant
- May 21 – Greg Tabor
- May 23 – Kevin Romine
- May 25 – Kerwin Danley
- May 30 – Jim Steels

=== June ===
- June 2 – Jeff Schulz
- June 3 – José Tolentino
- June 8 – Kevin Gross
- June 9 – Tom Edens
- June 17
  - Mickey Brantley
  - Víctor Mata
- June 18
  - Andrés Galarraga
  - Tom McCarthy
- June 19 – Steve Stanicek
- June 20 – Gary Varsho

=== July ===
- July 14 – Vic Rodriguez
- July 16 – DeMarlo Hale
- July 23 – Chuck Crim
- July 27 – Nelson Santovenia

=== August ===
- August 2 – Danny Sheaffer
- August 4 – Mark Wasinger
- August 15 – Chris Brown
- August 16
  - Greg Jelks
  - Donnie Scott
- August 18 – Jack Howell
- August 19 – Mark Ciardi
- August 23 – Tony Ghelfi
- August 26
  - Ángel Hernández
  - Jeff Parrett
- August 27 – Mike Maddux
- August 29 – Jeff Kellogg
- August 31 – Mike Hartley

=== September ===
- September 2 – Jeff Russell
- September 5 – Tom Dozier
- September 6 – Roy Smith
- September 9 – Jim Corsi
- September 16
  - Scott Medvin
  - Mark Parent
  - Chris Pittaro
- September 22
  - Vince Coleman
  - Bob Geren
- September 26 – Steve Buechele
- September 28
  - Ed Vosberg
  - Kevin Ward

=== October ===
- October 4 – Mike Sharperson
- October 13 – Mike Capel
- October 16
  - Dave Stapleton
  - Billy Taylor
- October 17 – Dan Pasqua
- October 19 – Tim Belcher
- October 20
  - Jerry Meals
  - Keith Smith
- October 23 – Jim Presley
- October 24
  - Rafael Belliard
  - Danny Clay
  - Steve Ziem
- October 26 – Gus Polidor
- October 27 – Bill Swift
- October 28 – Bob Melvin
- October 30 – Scott Garrelts
- October 30 – Joe Johnson

=== November ===
- November 4
  - Mark Bailey
  - Logan Easley
  - Ángel Salazar
- November 5 – Fred Manrique
- November 7 – Orlando Mercado
- November 10 – Phil Ouellette
- November 11
  - Pete Coachman
  - Scott May
  - Kevin Towers
- November 12 – Greg Gagne
- November 15 – Mike Payne
- November 18 – Mike Felder
- November 19 – Jeff Hearron
- November 27 – Randy Milligan

=== December ===
- December 1 – Herm Winningham
- December 4 – Alexis Infante
- December 9 – Bruce Tanner
- December 11
  - Mike Henneman
  - Bob Sebra
- December 14 – Jeff Robinson
- December 18
  - Scott Bailes
  - Dave Hengel
- December 21 – Michael Weiner
- December 22 – Andy Allanson
- December 25 – Rick Renteria
- December 26
  - Storm Davis
  - Jim Traber
- December 31
  - Rick Aguilera
  - Steve Engel
  - Donell Nixon

== Deaths ==
=== January ===
- January 5 – Fred Luderus, 75, Philadelphia Phillies first baseman of the 1910s, captain of the 1915 NL champions.
- January 8
  - Ray Nelson, 85, second baseman who played in 39 games for the 1921 New York Giants.
  - Schoolboy Rowe, 50, three-time All-Star pitcher who won 158 games, mainly with the Detroit Tigers (1933–1942) and Philadelphia Phillies (1943 and 1946–1949); member of Detroit's 1935 World Series champions.
- January 14 – John Cavanaugh, 60, third baseman who played in one game for the Philadelphia Phillies on July 5, 1919.
- January 15
  - Lefty Capers, 54, pitcher who worked in 15 games for Louisville of the Negro leagues in 1930 and 1931.
  - Joe Price, 63, outfielder who appeared in one game for the New York Giants on September 5, 1928.
- January 17 – Bud Tinning, 54, pitcher who appeared in 99 games for the 1932–1934 Chicago Cubs and 1935 St. Louis Cardinals; led National League in winning percentage in 1933 (.684).
- January 18 – Gene Woodburn, 74, pitcher who worked in 31 contests for the 1911–1912 St. Louis Cardinals.
- January 26 – George Hogreiver, 91, outfielder in 123 games for the 1896 Cincinnati Reds and the 1901 Milwaukee Brewers.
- January 28
  - Red Kelly, 76, outfielder for 1910 Chicago White Sox and Notre Dame graduate.
  - Red Oldham, 67, pitcher for the Detroit Tigers and Pittsburgh Pirates who worked in 176 games over seven seasons between 1914 and 1926; member of 1925 World Series champion Pirates.
- January 30 – Aaron Ward, 64, second baseman on the New York Yankees' first championship team in 1923; played in 1,059 games for the Yankees (1917–1926), Chicago White Sox (1927) and Cleveland Indians (1928).
- January 31 – Guy Cantrell, 56, pitcher who worked in 38 career games over three seasons between 1925 and 1930 for the Brooklyn Robins, Philadelphia Athletics and Detroit Tigers.

=== February ===
- February 2
  - Lefty Atkinson, 56, outfielder who appeared in MLB as a pinch runner in one contest (and scored one run) for the 1927 Washington Senators.
  - Red Holt, 66, first baseman in 25 games for the 1925 Philadelphia Athletics.
- February 3 – Dana Fillingim, 67, pitcher who appeared in 200 MLB games between 1915 and 1925, 187 of them for the Boston Braves.
- February 4
  - Parke Carroll, 56, former newspaper sports editor who became a baseball executive; business manager of the Kansas City Athletics from 1955 to 1958, then general manager in 1959 and 1960.
  - Jim Elam, 40, pitcher/first baseman for the 1943 Newark Eagles of the Negro National League.
- February 8 – Bert Yeabsley, 67, minor-league outfielder who appeared in MLB in three games as a pinch hitter or pinch runner for the 1919 Philadelphia Phillies.
- February 11 – Pete Shields, 69, first baseman who played 23 games for the Cleveland Indians in April and May 1915.
- February 15 – Joe Bean, 86, shortstop who played 50 games for the 1902 New York Giants.
- February 16 – Dazzy Vance, 69, Hall of Fame pitcher who led the National League in strikeouts seven years in a row, captured 197 MLB victories (190 for Brooklyn) and won the 1924 MVP award.
- February 17 – Doc Johnston, 73, first baseman in 1,056 games over 11 seasons between 1909 and 1922 as a member of the Cincinnati Reds, Cleveland Naps/Indians, Pittsburgh Pirates and Philadelphia Athletics.
- February 19
  - Art Loudell, 78, pitcher for 1910 Detroit Tigers.
  - Epp Sell, 63, pitcher who appeared in 12 games for the 1922–1923 St. Louis Cardinals.
  - Red Smith, 61, shortstop who played 20 games for the Philadelphia Athletics in 1925.
- February 20 – Otto "Oom Paul" Krueger, 84, shortstop and third baseman in 507 games between 1899 and 1905 for Cleveland, St. Louis, Pittsburgh and Philadelphia, all of the National League.
- February 23 – Davey Crockett, 85, first baseman who played 28 games for the 1901 Detroit Tigers.
- February 26 – Happy Smith, 77, outfielder and pinch hitter for the 1910 Brooklyn Superbas.

=== March ===
- March 1 – Alex Malloy, 74, pitcher who went 0–6 (2.56) in seven games and six starts for the 1910 St. Louis Browns.
- March 13
  - Joe Berry, 88, catcher for the Philadelphia Phillies for one game in 1902; his son Joe Jr. played second base for the 1921–1922 New York Giants.
  - Simon Pauxtis, 75, University of Pennsylvania graduate who appeared in four games as a catcher for the 1909 Cincinnati Reds; later, a college football coach (Dickinson College, Widener University).
  - Speed Whatley, 46, outfielder for five Negro leagues clubs (notably the Homestead Grays) between 1937 and 1944; led Negro American League in slugging percentage (.692) as a rookie.
- March 28
  - Jack Coveney, 80, catcher who played four games for 1903 St. Louis Cardinals.
  - Powel Crosley Jr., 74, industrialist, inventor and entrepreneur; owner of the Cincinnati Reds from 1934 until his death.
  - Jim Hackett, 83, first baseman and pitcher who played in 105 games for the 1902–1903 St. Louis Cardinals.
- March 30 – Alonzo Longware, 70, third baseman for the Indianapolis ABCs and Detroit Stars in 1920, the maiden season of the Negro National League.

=== April ===
- April 8 – Fred Brickell, 54, outfielder who appeared in 501 games for the Pittsburgh Pirates and Philadelphia Phillies between 1926 and 1933; father of Fritz Brickell.
- April 9 – Lefty York, 68, pitcher who hurled in 68 games for the 1919 Philadelphia Athletics and 1921 Chicago Cubs.
- April 10
  - Jim Kelly, 77, outfielder for the National League's Pittsburgh Pirates (1914) and Boston Braves (1918), and Federal League's Pittsburgh Rebels (1915).
  - Branch Rickey Jr., 47, vice president and farm system director of the Pirates since 1951; farm director and assistant general manager of the Brooklyn Dodgers from 1939 to 1950; son of the Hall of Fame baseball executive.
- April 15
  - Nick Cullop, 73, pitcher for the Cleveland Naps, New York Yankees and St. Louis Browns, who also won 22 games for the 1915 Kansas City Packers in the outlaw Federal League.
  - Jess Doyle, 63, pitcher in 55 big-league games between 1925 and 1931, all but one of them for the Detroit Tigers.
  - Cy Falkenberg, 81, pitcher who won 130 games over a 12-season career in the American, National and Federal leagues between 1903 and 1917, including 23 for the 1913 Cleveland Naps.
- April 21 – Lum Davenport, 60, Chicago White Sox southpaw who pitched in 25 games over all or part of four seasons from 1921 to 1924.
- April 23 – Jack Barry, 73, shortstop of the Philadelphia Athletics' "$100,000 infield", coach since 1921 at Holy Cross, where he won the 1952 College World Series and posted the highest career winning percentage (.806) in collegiate history.
- April 27 – Frank Gibson, 70, catcher and first baseman in 471 games for the 1913 Detroit Tigers and the 1921–1927 Boston Braves.
- April 28
  - Tommy Connolly, 90, Hall of Fame umpire from 1898 to 1931 who worked the first American League game ever, as well as the first contests at Comiskey Park, Shibe Park, Fenway Park and Yankee Stadium.
  - Curtis Ricks, 68, pitcher/outfielder for the 1922 Cleveland Tate Stars and 1923 Chicago American Giants of the Negro National League.

=== May ===
- May 1 – Jim Hanley, 75, left-handed pitcher who worked in one game for the 1913 New York Yankees.
- May 4 – Frank Jude, 76, Native American (Ojibwe) outfielder and classmate of Jim Thorpe's at Carlisle Indian School who appeared in 80 games for the 1906 Cincinnati Reds.
- May 8 – Weldon Wyckoff, 70, Philadelphia Athletics right-hander who pitched for the 1913 World Series champions, the 1914 American League champions, and the 1915 A's, who fell all the way into the AL basement with a 43–109 record; Wyckoff went 10–22 for that team; he also appeared briefly for 1916 Athletics and 1916–1918 Boston Red Sox.
- May 11
  - Lee Dunham, 58, first baseman and pinch hitter in five games for the 1926 Philadelphia Phillies.
  - Jack Marshall, 68, pitcher and part-time first baseman who played in the Negro leagues from 1920 to 1924 and in 1928–1929.
- May 13
  - Al Humphrey, 75, outfielder in eight games for the 1911 Brooklyn Dodgers.
  - Binky Jones, 61, shortstop who played in ten games for the 1924 Brooklyn Robins.
- May 15 – John Taff, 70, pitcher who appeared in five games for the 1913 Philadelphia Athletics.
- May 16 – Dick Harley, 86, pitcher who worked in nine games for Boston of the National League in 1905.
- May 17
  - Otto Knabe, 76, second baseman for the Philadelphia Phillies from 1907 to 1913; also played briefly for Pittsburgh and Chicago of the National League; player-manager for the Baltimore Terrapins of the "outlaw" Federal League.
  - Barney Slaughter, 76, pitcher in eight games for the 1910 Phillies.
- May 21 – Ben Koehler, 84, outfielder and native of Germany who appeared in 208 games for the 1905–1906 St. Louis Browns.
- May 22 – Mike Regan, 73, pitcher who appeared in 55 games for the Cincinnati Reds between 1917 and 1919.
- May 28 – Fred Smith, 69, infielder who played 438 career games as a member of the 1913 Boston Braves and 1917 St. Louis Cardinals, as well as for Buffalo and Brooklyn of the Federal League in 1914 and 1915.

=== June ===
- June 4 – Iron Davis, 71, pitcher in 36 games for the New York Highlanders and Boston Braves between 1912 and 1915; threw a no-hit, no-run game against the Philadelphia Phillies on September 9, 1914, the first no-hitter at two-year-old Fenway Park, the Braves' occasional home field that season.
- June 5 – Syd Smith, 77, catcher who appeared in 146 games between 1908 and 1915 for the Philadelphia Athletics, St. Louis Browns, Cleveland Naps and Pittsburgh Pirates.
- June 10 – LaRue Kirby, 71, centerfielder who played three games with 1912 New York Giants and 113 games with St. Louis Terriers (Federal League).
- June 11 – Frank Woodward, 67, pitcher in 42 games for the Philadelphia Phillies, St. Louis Cardinals, Washington Senators and Chicago White Sox between 1918 and 1923.
- June 16
  - Benny Bowcock, 81, second baseman for 1903 St. Louis Browns who appeared in 14 games and batted .320 in 50 at bats.
  - Mack Hillis, 59, infielder who played 12 MLB games as a member of 1924 New York Yankees and 1928 Pittsburgh Pirates.
  - Tullie McAdoo, 76, light-hitting first baseman who appeared in 253 games in the Negro National League, primarily for St. Louis, from 1920 to 1924.
  - Chuck Miller, 71, outfielder and pinch hitter in 40 games for 1913–1914 St. Louis Cardinals.
- June 17 – Ollie Johns, 81, left-hander who pitched in four games for the 1905 Cincinnati Reds.
- June 18 – Eddie Gaedel, 36, 3 ft 7 in (1.09 m) player who, as part of a Bill Veeck stunt promotion, made one official MLB appearance as a pinch hitter for the St. Louis Browns on August 19, 1951.
- June 21 – Al "Big Dutch" Bergman, 71, second baseman and Notre Dame alumnus who appeared in eight games for 1916 Cleveland Indians.
- June 23 – Connie Day, 63, second baseman whose playing career in the Negro leagues extended over ten seasons between 1920 and 1932.
- June 26 – Bill Collins, 79, outfielder for Boston, Brooklyn and Chicago of the National League and Buffalo of the Federal League in 1910–1911 and 1913–1914.
- June 30 – Dizzy Dismukes, 71, pitcher in 86 games in Negro leagues over nine seasons between 1920 and 1932; played first base and the outfield in six more career contests and managed eight Negro leagues teams.

=== July ===
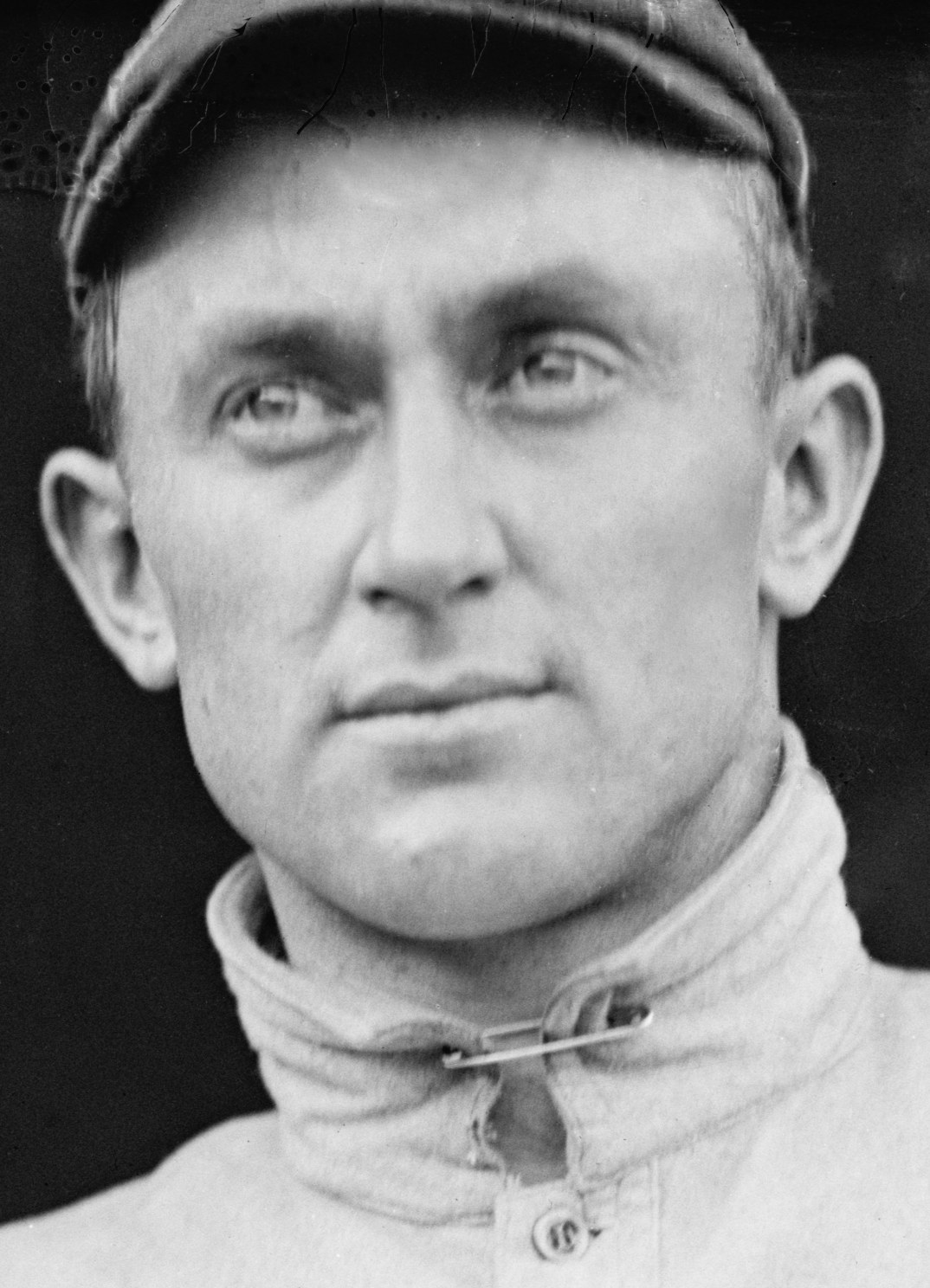
Ty Cobb (1913)

- July 3 – Bill Finneran, 83, umpire in National League (1911–1912 and 1923) and Federal League (1915).
- July 4 – Jake Hehl, 61, pitcher who appeared in one game at age 18 for the Brooklyn Robins on June 20, 1918.
- July 16 – Mike Mitchell, 81, outfielder who played 1,124 games for the Cincinnati Reds, Chicago Cubs, Pittsburgh Pirates and Washington Senators between 1907 and 1914.
- July 17
  - Ty Cobb, 74, the Detroit Tigers' Hall of Fame center fielder (1905–1926) widely recognized during his lifetime as the greatest player in the sport's history, and holder of more records than any other player, including highest lifetime batting average (.367) and most career hits (4,191), runs (2,245), steals (892), games (3,033) and at bats (11,429); as player-manager of Tigers from 1921 to 1926, he compiled a 479–443 (.520) record, then finished his baseball career as a player only with Philadelphia Athletics (1927–1928).
  - Ed Reulbach, 78, pitcher who starred for the Chicago Cubs from 1905 to 1913, winning 182 career games.
- July 18 – Hod Eller, 67, pitcher for the Cincinnati Reds from 1917 to 1921, including a 1919 World Series game which saw him strike out six Chicago White Sox batters in a row.
- July 25 – Carlton Molesworth, 85, pitcher in only four games for Washington of the National League in 1895 who went on to a long career as a minor-league manager and scout.
- July 27 – Jack Little, 78, centerfielder and Baylor graduate who played in three games for 1912 New York Highlanders.
- July 28 – John Grim, 93, 19th-century catcher who appeared in 708 games for Philadelphia, Louisville and Brooklyn of the National League and Rochester and Milwaukee of the American Association between 1888 and 1899 .
- July 31 – Bud Weiser, 70, outfielder in 41 games for 1915–1916 Philadelphia Phillies.

=== August ===
- August 2
  - Harry Gardner, 74, pitcher in 14 games for the 1911–1912 Pittsburgh Pirates.
  - Walter Morris, 81, shortstop in 23 games for the 1908 St. Louis Cardinals, later a longtime minor-league manager and executive who helped to organize 12 different leagues.
- August 3 – Tom Downey, 77, infielder for the Cincinnati Reds, Philadelphia Phillies and Chicago Cubs (1909–1912), then the Buffalo Bisons of the Federal League (1914–1915).
- August 4 – Chuck Rose, 75, outfielder, first baseman and southpaw pitcher who hurled in three games for the St. Louis Browns in 1909.
- August 14 – Harry Colliflower, 92, pitcher and outfielder for the 1899 Cleveland Spiders who spent one year, 1910, as an American League umpire.
- August 17 – Jack McCandless, 70, outfielder in 128 games for Baltimore of the Federal League in 1914 and 1915.
- August 18 – John Leary, 70, first baseman and catcher in 219 games for the 1914–1915 St. Louis Browns.
- August 29 – Bill Schwartz, 77, first baseman in 24 games for the 1904 Cleveland Naps.

=== September ===
- September 9
  - Jesse Barnes, 69, pitcher who won 152 games for the Boston Braves, New York Giants and Brooklyn Dodgers between 1915 and 1927, including a no-hitter on May 7, 1922, against the Philadelphia Phillies.
  - Rube Oldring, 77, outfielder who played mainly for the Philadelphia Athletics, including four pennant winners (1910, 1911, 1913, 1914).
- September 11 – Bill "Chink" Outen, 56, lefty-swinging catcher and pinch hitter who appeared in 93 games for the 1933 Brooklyn Dodgers.
- September 15 – Leon Carlson, 66, relief pitcher who made three appearances for 1920 Washington Senators.
- September 20 – Jim McGinley, 82, pitcher for the 1904–1905 St. Louis Cardinals.
- September 23 – Ted Jourdan, 66, first baseman who played in 75 games for the Chicago White Sox (1916–1918 and 1920).
- September 26 – Vern Hughes, 68, southpaw who twirled in three contests for the 1914 Baltimore Terrapins (Federal League).
- September 27 – Bick Campbell, 63, umpire who worked 936 career games in American League (1928–1931) and National League (1938–1940).

=== October ===
- October 4 – Roy Golden, 73, pitcher who twirled in 37 games for the 1910–1911 St. Louis Cardinals.
- October 14 – Clyde Southwick, 74, catcher who played four games for the 1911 St. Louis Browns.
- October 17
  - Abe Atkins, 67, third baseman for the 1923 Toledo Tigers of the Negro National League.
  - Harry Felix, 86, pitcher in ten games for the New York Giants and Philadelphia Phillies in 1901 and 1902.
- October 21 – Harry Gleason, 86, infielder/outfielder who played from 1901 through 1905 for the Boston Americans and St. Louis Browns.
- October 29 – Tom Cafego, 50, left fielder, pinch hitter and pinch runner who appeared in four games for 1937 St. Louis Browns.

=== November ===
- November 1 – Tom Hughes, 77, pitcher for the New York Highlanders (1906–1907 and 1909–1910) and Boston Braves (1914–1918); threw a no-hit, no-run game against Pittsburgh on June 16, 1916.
- November 3 – Freddie Maguire, 62, second baseman who played in 618 games for New York Giants, Chicago Cubs and Boston Braves over six seasons between 1922 and 1931.
- November 4 – Kid Mohler, 90, whose playing career lasted 24 seasons spanning 1890 to 1914 but appeared in only three games in majors as a rare, left-handed-throwing second baseman for Washington of the National League in 1894; head baseball coach, U.S. Naval Academy, 1929 to 1932; member, Pacific Coast League Hall of Fame.
- November 6 – Roy Hartzell, 80, outfielder, third baseman and shortstop who appeared in 1,290 games for the St. Louis Browns and New York Highlanders/Yankees between 1906 and 1916.
- November 17 – Benny Kauff, 71, "the Ty Cobb of the Feds", outfielder who won back-to-back batting (.370 and .342) and stolen base (75 and 55) titles in the 1914–1915 Federal League, then considered an "outlaw" circuit but now recognized as a major league; also played for New York Highlanders of the American League and New York Giants of the National; banned from baseball by Commissioner Kenesaw Mountain Landis after he was tried and found innocent on charges of car theft in 1920.
- November 23 – Nick Carter, 82, pitcher in 14 games for the 1908 Philadelphia Athletics.
- November 24 – John Mohardt, 63, outfielder/pinch runner for 1922 Detroit Tigers.
- November 27 – Bob Harmon, 74, pitcher for the St. Louis Cardinals and Pittsburgh Pirates from 1909 to 1918; won 23 games for 1911 Cardinals.
- November 28 – Earl Moore, 84, pitcher who won 163 games between 1901 and 1914 in the American, National and Federal leagues; posted a 20–8 won–lost mark for the 1903 Cleveland Naps, and led the American League in ERA (1.74); also won 22 games for the 1910 Philadelphia Phillies.

=== December ===
- December 5
  - Judge Emil Fuchs, 83, cash-strapped owner of the Boston Braves from 1922 to July 31, 1935; managed the Braves himself to a last-place 56–98 record in 1929; one of his final acts as owner was the ill-fated 1935 purchase of Babe Ruth, who batted only .181 with six home runs in 28 games, and retired on May 30.
  - Frank Mahar, 83, amateur outfielder pressed into emergency service by Philadelphia Phillies on August 29, 1902, for match against the New York Giants; according to SABR, he was hit in the mouth by a fly ball in warmups and was forced to leave the game after playing only a single inning in left field.
- December 8
  - Coonie Blank, 69, catcher for the 1909 St. Louis Cardinals.
  - Lou Koupal, 62, pitcher who worked in 101 games over six seasons between 1925 and 1937 for four big-league clubs.
- December 10 – Bert Maxwell, 75, pitched in 21 games over four widely dispersed seasons for 1906 Pittsburgh Pirates, 1908 Philadelphia Athletics, 1911 New York Giants and 1914 Brooklyn Tip-Tops (Federal League).
- December 15 – William "Dummy" Hoy, 99, center fielder for seven clubs, primarily Cincinnati, over 14 seasons between 1888 and 1902, who scored over 100 runs nine times, and was the game's most accomplished deaf player; he had thrown out the first ball of the 1961 World Series' third game on October 7.
- December 17 – Ping Bodie, 74, outfielder in 1,050 games for the Chicago White Sox, Philadelphia Athletics and New York Yankees between 1911 and 1921; one of first Italian-Americans to play in the major leagues.
- December 25
  - Frank Foutz, 84, first baseman who played 20 games for the 1901 Baltimore Orioles of the American League.
  - Don Savage, 42, third baseman who played in 105 games for the 1944–1945 Yankees.
- December 31 – Dutch Lieber, 51, relief pitcher for the 1934–1935 Philadelphia Athletics; in 21 games, posted a 1–2 won–lost mark with two saves.
