= Lefty (disambiguation) =

Lefty is a nickname for a left-handed person.

Lefty may also refer to:

== People ==
- Lefty Dizz (1937-1993), Chicago blues guitarist and singer born Walter Williams
- Stella Lefty (born 2002), American singer-songwriter

== Art, entertainment, and media ==
=== Fictional characters ===
- Lefty, a character from Freddy Fazbear's Pizzeria Simulator
- Lefty, a fictional cowboy character played by Garrison Keillor in the A Prairie Home Companion feature, the adventures of Dusty and Lefty, "The Lives of the Cowboys"
- Lefty the Salesman, a Sesame Street character
- Levsha (disambiguation), the Russian title usually translated as "Lefty" or "the Left-Hander")

=== Film ===
- Lefty (1964 film), an animated film directed by Ivan Ivanov-Vano
- Lefty (1987 film), a feature film directed by Sergei Ovcharov
- Lefty (2026 film), a film directed by Vladimir Besedin

=== Literature ===
- "The Tale of Cross-eyed Lefty from Tula and the Steel Flea" (sometimes called "Lefty"), an 1881 short story by Nikolai Leskov

=== Music ===
- Lefty (album), a 1988 album by Art Garfunkel
- "Lefty", a song from the album Six by Soft Machine

== Other uses ==
- Lefty (protein), proteins that are closely related members of the TGF-beta family of growth factors
- Lefty shock, a front shock on some Cannondale bicycle wheels
- Leftist or lefty, someone who believes in left-wing politics

== See also ==
- Righty (disambiguation)
