= Left-Hander =

A left-hander is a left-handed person.

(The) Left-Hander, or variants, may refer to:

- The Left-Hander («Левша» Levsha), also The Tale of Cross-eyed Lefty from Tula and the Steel Flea, a comic story by Nikolai Leskov 1881
- Left-Hander (1964 film) («Левша» Levsha), a Russian film based on the story
- The Left-Hander (1987 film) («Левша» Levsha), a Russian film based on the story
- The Left-Hander (opera) («Левша» Levsha), a 2013 Russian opera by Shchedrin
- "The Left-Hander", a single by Dutch DJ Martyn (musician)

== See also ==
- The Left-Handed Man, a 1913 American film
- The Left-Handed Woman, a 1978 German film
- Lefty
