= Lefty =

Lefty is a nickname for a person who is left-handed. The nickname is commonly given to baseball players, particularly pitchers who throw left. Lefty may refer to:

== American baseball players ==
=== Pitchers ===
- Lefty Bell (fl. 1948)
- Lefty Bertrand (1909–2002)
- Lefty Boone (1920–1976)
- Randolph "Lefty" Bowe (1918–2016)
- Lefty Bowers (1909–1978)
- Farmer "Lefty" Brady (1893–1957)
- Walter "Lefty" Calhoun (1911–1976)
- Lefty Capers (1906–1961)
- Steve Carlton (born 1944)
- Cliff Chambers (1922–2012)
- Lefty Clarke (1896–1975), pitched for one game
- Frank "Lefty" Fanovich (1923–2011)
- Lefty George (1886–1955)
- Lefty Gervais (1890–1950)
- Lefty Gomez (1908–1989), Mexican-American
- Lefty Grove (1900–1975)
- Lefty Harvey (1890–unknown)
- Lefty Herring (1880–1965)
- Lefty Hoerst (1917–2000)
- Lefty Holmes (1907–1987)
- Lefty Hopper (1874–1959)
- Frank Killen (1870–1939)
- Lefty Leifield (1883–1970)
- Lefty Mellix (1896–1985)
- Lefty Moses (1914–1989)
- Lefty Pangburn (1886–1973)
- Lefty Phillips (born 1918)
- Lefty Robinson (1891–1974)
- Lefty Stewart (1900–1974)
- Lefty Tyler (1889–1953)
- Lefty Weinert (1900–1973)
- Lefty Wilkie (1914–1992), Canadian
- Lefty Williams (1893–1959), involved in the Black Sox scandal
- Lefty York (1892–1961)

=== Other baseball players ===
- Lefty Atkinson (1904–1961)
- Lefty Davis (1875–1919), outfielder
- Lefty Guise (1908–1968)
- Lefty Houtz (1875–1959), outfielder
- Lefty Marr (1862–1912)
- Lefty Mills (1912–1982)
- Lefty O'Doul (1897–1969), Major League Baseball player and minor league manager
- Lefty Phillips (1919–1972), Major League Baseball coach, manager, scout and executive

== Other people ==
- Lefty Bates (1920–2007), American Chicago blues guitarist
- Lefty Byers (1905–2000), American basketball coach and player
- Paul "Lefty" Courty (1925–2008), American basketball player
- Lefty Dizz (1937–1993), American guitarist and singer
- Lefty Driesell (1931–2024), American college basketball coach
- Lefty Frizzell (1928–1975), American country music singer and songwriter
- Maurice Bennett "Lefty" Flynn (1892–1959), American football player and actor
- Lefty Hendrickson (born 1943), Canadian football player
- Lefty Kreh (1925–2018), American fly fisherman and photographer
- Lefty McFadden, namesake of the Lefty McFadden Invitational college ice hockey tournament
- Phil Mickelson (born 1970), American professional golfer
- Lefty Reid (1927–2020), Canadian curator
- Frank Rosenthal (1929–2008), American sports handicapper, Las Vegas casino executive, bookmaker and organized crime associate
- Lefty Ruggiero (1926–1994), American mobster
- Lew Tendler (1898–1970), American Hall-of-Fame boxer
- "Lefty", an on-air name for American disc jockey Captain Mikey, born Marion Elbridge Herrington (1935–1997)
- Stella Lefty (born 2002), American singer-songwriter

== Fictional characters ==
- Lefty, main character in Texas Chainsaw Massacre 2.
- Lefty, character in the Five Nights at Freddy's franchise.
- Levsha (disambiguation), the Russian title usually translated as "Lefty" or "the Left-Hander")

== See also ==
- Gaius Mucius Scaevola, a brave Roman, possibly mythical, youth who earned the cognomen Scaevola, meaning left-handed
