= Levsha =

Levsha (Russian: «Левша» ("Lefty" or the "Left-Hander")) may refer to:

- "The Tale of Cross-eyed Lefty from Tula and the Steel Flea", comic story by Nikolai Leskov 1881
- Left-Hander (1964 film), Russian film based on the story by Nikolai Leskov
- The Left-Hander (1986 film), Russian film based on the story, 1986
- The Left-Hander (opera), a 2013 opera by Shchedrin, based on the story by Nikolai Leskov
- Levsha, 1975 opera by Anatoly Alexandrov
