= 1974 Senior League World Series =

American youth baseball tournament

Tournament information
- Location: Gary, Indiana
- Dates: August 12–17, 1974

Final positions
- Champions: Pingtung, Taiwan
- Runner-up: Charlotte, North Carolina

The 1974 Senior League World Series took place from August 12–17 in Gary, Indiana, United States. Pingtung, Taiwan defeated Charlotte, North Carolina in the championship game. It was Taiwan's third straight championship.

This year saw the tournament field reduced, from ten, to eight teams.

== Teams ==
United States	International
(Pennsylvania) Berwick, Pennsylvania East	Thunder Bay, Ontario; Fort William; Canada
(Illinois) Chicago, Illinois; Clear Ridge; North	(West Germany) Wiesbaden, West Germany Europe
(North Carolina) Charlotte, North Carolina South	(Taiwan) Pingtung, Taiwan Far East
(California) Lennox, California West	(Puerto Rico) Guayabo, Puerto Rico Latin America

== Results ==
Upper round 1	Upper round 2	Upper final	Championship
—	California	3
—	Illinois	2
1–0	California	5
1–0	Pennsylvania	3
—	Pennsylvania	4
—	Puerto Rico	1
2–0	California	1
2–0	Taiwan	5
—	West Germany	0
—	North Carolina (F/8)	3
1–0	North Carolina	2
1–0	Taiwan	5
—	Canada	0
—	Taiwan	12	3–0	Taiwan	5	—
4–1	North Carolina	1	—
Lower round 1	Lower round 2	Lower round 3	Lower final
1–1	North Carolina	2
0–1	Illinois	12	1–1	Illinois	0	2–1	California	5
0–1	Puerto Rico	3	2–1	North Carolina (F/10)	10	3–1	North Carolina	7
2–1	West Germany	9
1–1	Pennsylvania	0
0–1	West Germany	7	1–1	West Germany	8
0–1	Canada	5

1974 Senior League World Series Champions
Pingtung, Taiwan
