= Righty =

Righty may refer to:

- Right-hander or righty, someone who is right-handed

== Arts, entertainment, and media ==
=== Fictional characters ===
- Migi or Righty, a character on Parasyte, a manga series
- Righty, a character in Monsuno, a Japanese-American animated series

=== Mascots ===
- Righty, a mascot for the Boston Red Sox Major League Baseball team

== Other uses ==
- Lefty Loosey, Righty Tighty, a mnemonic used for the directions to loosen or tighten screws
- Rightist or righty, someone who believes in right-wing politics

== See also ==
- Lefty (disambiguation)
