= 1961 Senior League World Series =

American youth baseball tournament

Tournament information
- Location: Williamsport, Pennsylvania
- Dates: August 22–25, 1961

Final positions
- Champions: Natrona Heights, Pennsylvania
- Runner-up: Sylva, North Carolina

The 1961 Senior League World Series (then known as the "Senior Division Tournament") took place from August 22–25 in Williamsport, Pennsylvania, United States at Bowman Field. Natrona Heights, Pennsylvania defeated Sylva, North Carolina in the championship game.

This was the inaugural SLWS.

== Teams ==
United States
(Pennsylvania) South Williamsport, Pennsylvania Host	Sylva, North Carolina
Atmore, Alabama	Brook Park, Ohio
Harlan, Kentucky	Natrona Heights, Pennsylvania
North East, Maryland	Riverside, Rhode Island
Pompton Lakes, New Jersey	

== Results ==
Opening Game
(Pennsylvania) Host	3
Maryland	2

First Round
(Pennsylvania) Host	1
Pennsylvania	2
New Jersey	2
Alabama	1
North Carolina	9
Kentucky	0
Ohio	2
Rhode Island	6

Semifinals
Pennsylvania (F/8)	9
New Jersey	8
North Carolina	6
Rhode Island	0

Championship
Pennsylvania	8
North Carolina	1

1961 Senior League World Series Champions
Natrona Heights, Pennsylvania
