= Curtis Ricks =

American baseball player

- Pitcher
- Born: April 26, 1893; St. Louis, Missouri, U.S.
- Died: April 28, 1961 (aged 68); South Bend, Indiana, U.S.
- Batted: Unknown Threw: Left

Negro league baseball debut
- 1922, for the Cleveland Tate Stars

Last appearance
- 1924, for the St. Louis Giants

Teams
- Cleveland Tate Stars (1922); Chicago American Giants (1923); St. Louis Giants (1924)

Curtis Jerome Ricks (April 26, 1893 – April 28, 1961) was an American professional baseball pitcher in the Negro leagues. He played with the Cleveland Tate Stars, Chicago American Giants, and St. Louis Giants from 1922 to 1924.
