= Abe Atkins =

American baseball player

- Third baseman
- Born: November 20, 1893; Tamms, Illinois, U.S.
- Died: October 17, 1961 (aged 67); Akron, Ohio, U.S.
- Batted: Unknown Threw: Unknown

Negro league baseball debut
- 1923, for the Toledo Tigers

Last appearance
- 1923, for the Toledo Tigers
- Stats at Baseball Reference

Teams
- Toledo Tigers (1923)

Abe Atkins (November 20, 1893 – October 17, 1961) was an American professional baseball third baseman in the Negro leagues. He played with the Toledo Tigers in 1923.
