= Dick Harley (pitcher) =

American baseball player (1874–1961)

- Pitcher
- Born: August 18, 1874; Springfield, Ohio, U.S.
- Died: May 16, 1961 (aged 86); Springfield, Ohio, U.S.
- Batted: Right Threw: Right

MLB debut
- April 15, 1905, for the Boston Beaneaters

Last MLB appearance
- August 18, 1905, for the Boston Beaneaters

MLB statistics
- Win–loss record: 2-5
- Earned run average: 4.66
- Strikeouts: 19
- Stats at Baseball Reference

Teams
- Boston Beaneaters (1905)

Henry Risk "Dick" Harley (August 18, 1874 – May 16, 1961) was an American pitcher in Major League Baseball. He played for the Boston Beaneaters in 1905.
