= Lefty Robinson =

- Pitcher
- Born: March 2, 1891; New Madrid, Missouri, U.S.
- Died: August 14, 1974 (aged 83); Jefferson City, Missouri, U.S.
- Batted: Left Threw: Left

Negro league baseball debut
- 1923, for the Birmingham Black Barons

Last appearance
- 1932, for the Atlanta Black Crackers

Teams
- Birmingham Black Barons (1923, 1925); St. Louis Stars (1924, 1927); Atlanta Black Crackers (1932)

Charles "Lefty" Robinson (March 2, 1891 - August 14, 1974) was an American Negro leagues pitcher from 1923 to 1932. He pitched and played for the Birmingham Black Barons, St. Louis Stars and Atlanta Black Crackers.
