= Lefty Atkinson =

American baseball player (1904-1961)

- Pinch runner
- Born: June 4, 1904; Chicago, Illinois, U.S.
- Died: February 12, 1961 (aged 56); Chicago, Illinois, U.S.
- Batted: Left Threw: Left

MLB debut
- August 5, 1927, for the Washington Senators

Last MLB appearance
- August 5, 1927, for the Washington Senators

MLB statistics
- Games played: 1
- At bats: 1
- Runs: 1
- Stats at Baseball Reference

Teams
- Washington Senators (1927)

Hubert Burley Atkinson (June 4, 1904 – February 2, 1961) was an American Major League Baseball player. He played for the Washington Senators during the 1927 season.
