= Lefty York =

American baseball player (1892–1961)

- Pitcher
- Born: November 1, 1892; West Fork, Arkansas
- Died: April 9, 1961 (aged 68); York, Pennsylvania
- Batted: Left Threw: Left

MLB debut
- September 12, 1919, for the Philadelphia Athletics

Last MLB appearance
- October 2, 1921, for the Chicago Cubs

MLB statistics
- Win–loss record: 5–11
- Earned run average: 5.34
- Strikeouts: 59
- Stats at Baseball Reference

Teams
- Philadelphia Athletics (1919); Chicago Cubs (1921)

James Edward "Lefty" York (November 1, 1892 – April 9, 1961) was an American professional baseball pitcher. He played two seasons in Major League Baseball (MLB) for the Philadelphia Athletics and Chicago Cubs. In 42 career games pitched, he posted a 5-11 career record, allowing 183 hits, 5 home runs and 95 runs.

In 1919 as a member of the A's, York pitched just two games, recording losses in both of them. In 1921 as a member of the Cubs, he pitched in 40 games including 11 starts and posted 5-9 record.

Lefty York was born on November 1, 1892, in West Fork, Arkansas, and died on April 9, 1961, in York, Pennsylvania.
