= Lefty Capers =

American baseball player

- Pitcher
- Born: October 10, 1906; Savannah, Georgia, U.S.
- Died: January 15, 1961 (aged 54); Boston, Massachusetts, U.S.
- Threw: Left

Negro league baseball debut
- 1930, for the Louisville Black Caps

Last appearance
- 1931, for the Louisville White Sox
- Stats at Baseball Reference

Teams
- Louisville Black Caps (1930); Louisville White Sox (1931)

Harold Haywood Capers (October 10, 1906 – January 15, 1961), nicknamed "Lefty", was an American Negro league pitcher in the 1930s.

A native of Savannah, Georgia, Capers made his Negro leagues debut in 1930 with the Louisville Black Caps. He played for Louisville again the following season as the team took the name "White Sox". Capers died in Boston, Massachusetts in 1961 at age 54.
