= The Tale of Cross-eyed Lefty from Tula and the Steel Flea =

1881 skaz by Nikolai Leskov

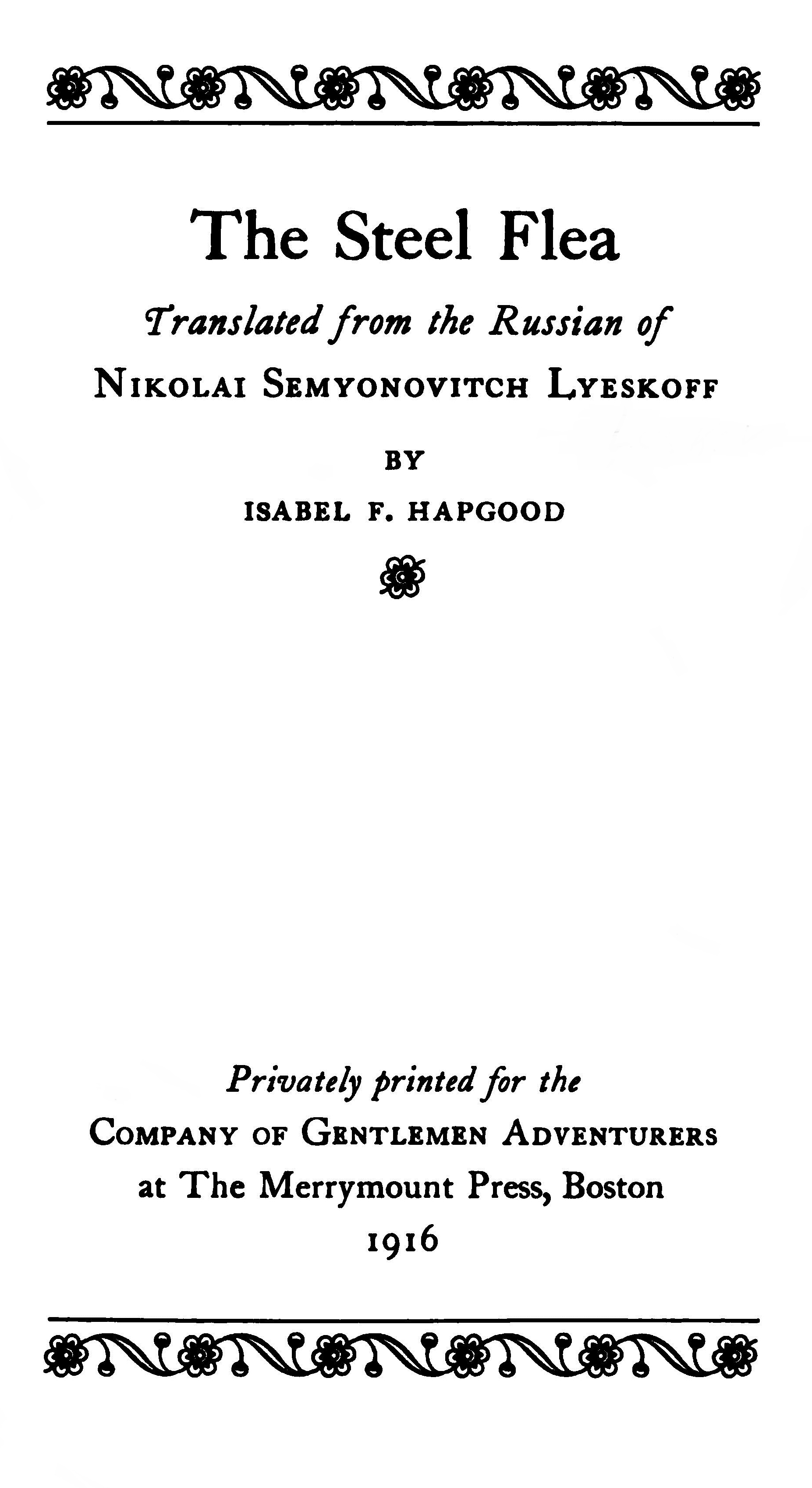
- 1916 title page
- Author: Nikolai Leskov
- Original title: Сказ о тульском косом Левше и о стальной блохе
- Translator: Isabel Hapgood (1916)
- Publication date: 1881

"The Tale of Cross-eyed Lefty from Tula and the Steel Flea" (Russian: Сказ о тульском косом Левше и о стальной блохе, Skaz o Tulskom kosom Levshe i o stalnoy Blokhe), The Tale of the Crosseyed Lefthander from Tula and the Steel Flea or simply Levsha (Russian: Левша, left-handed), variously translated as The Lefthander, Lefty, The Steel Flea or The Left-handed Craftsman is a well-known 1881 skaz (story) by Nikolai Leskov. Styled as a folk tale, it tells a story of a left-handed weapons craftsman from Tula (traditionally a center of the Russian armaments industry) who outperformed his English colleagues by providing a clockwork steel flea they'd made with horseshoes and inscriptions on them.

== Synopsis ==
Tsar Alexander I of Russia, while visiting England with his servant the Cossack Platov, is shown a variety of modern inventions. Platov keeps insisting that things in Russia are much better (embarrassing a guide at one point when he finds something that appears well made that turns out to be a Russian gun), until they are shown a small mechanical flea. After his ascension the next tsar, Nicolas I orders Platov (after he tries to hide the flea) to find someone to outperform the English who had created the clockwork steel flea (as small as a crumb, and the key to wind it up can only be seen through a microscope). Platov travels to Tula to find someone to better the English invention. Three gunsmiths agree to do the work and barricade themselves in a workshop. Villagers try to get them to come out in various ways (for example by yelling "fire"), but no one can get them to come out. When Platov arrives to check on their progress, he has some Cossacks try to open the workshop. They succeed in getting the roof to come off, but the crowd is disgusted when the trapped smell of body odor and metal work comes out of the workshop. The gunsmiths hand Platov the same flea he gave them and he curses them, believing that they have done absolutely nothing. He ends up dragging Lefty with him in order to have someone to answer for the failure.

The flea is given to the czar, to whom Lefty explains that he needs to look closer and closer at the flea to see what they have achieved. He winds it up and finds that it doesn't move. He discovers that, without any microscopes ("We are poor people"), Lefty and his accomplices managed to put appropriately sized horseshoes (with the craftsmen's engraved signatures) on the flea (Lefty made the nails, which cannot be seen since they are so small), which amazes the Tsar and the English (even though the flea now cannot dance as it used to). Lefty then gets an invitation and travels to England to study the English way of life and technical accomplishments. The English hosts try to talk him into staying in England, but he feels homesick and returns to Russia at the earliest opportunity. On the way back, he engages in a drinking duel with an English sailor, arriving in Saint Petersburg. The sailor is treated well, but the authorities finding no identification on Lefty and believing him to be a common drunkard, send him off to die in a hospital for unknowns.

The sailor, after sobering up, decides to find his new friend, and with the aid of Platov they locate him. While dying (his head is smashed from being thrown onto the pavement), he tells the doctor to tell the Emperor to stop having his soldiers clean their muskets with crushed brick (after he sees a dirty gun in England and realizes it fires so well because they keep it oily). The message never reaches the Emperor, however, because the war minister tells the doctor to mind his own business. Leskov comments (in the tale) that the Crimean War might have turned out differently if the message had been delivered. The story ends with Leskov commenting on the replacement of good, hard-earned labor and creativity with machines.

== Commentary ==
In his letter to the editor, Leskov mentioned that critics alleged that the story is a retelling of an "old and well-known legend". Leskov retorted that there was nothing of the kind, and the only thing known is a quip "The English made a flea of steel, and our Tula people shod it and sent it back to them".

The language of the story is unique; Leskov coined many folk-flavored neologisms and colloquialisms (many of them being replacements of borrowed non-Slavic words, very funny and natural). Many of them have become common sayings and proverbs.

Both Slavophiles and Westernizers used the story in support of their view. Leskov himself wrote that the story of Levsha may signify amazing Russian ingenuity and craftsmanship, but it also exposes the Russian society which neglects most talented Russian people, nevertheless Levsha is a patriot and wants to return home, although he sees that in England smart and laborious people live better.

== Cultural influence ==
In 1952, a ballet adaption was developed by Boris Alexandrovich Alexandrov and P. F. Abolimov. In order to maximize the ballet's patriotic message, the story was changed so that the flea keeps its leap and Lefty survives to return home to a love interest. The libretto was thought clumsy by the Central Committee of the All-Union Communist Party, however, and the ballet was only ever staged twice, in 1954 and 1976.

In 1964, Soviet director Ivan Ivanov-Vano made an animated 42-minute-long film called Lefty (Левша) that was based on the story.

A live-action film, The Left-Hander, was released in 1987. This version is played several times a day at the Museum of Jurassic Technology.

Lefty (2026 film), a film directed by Vladimir Besedin, is a science fiction action adventure film loosely based on the novel. The events of the novel are inserted into a plot within the framework of the geopolitical rivalry between the British and Russian empires ("The Great Game").

The book describes a "finelyscope" which can magnify up to five million times, similar to actual microscopes that are now being used in nanotechnology. For this reason it is featured in a Nature Physics article from 2007.

In the Russian language, the hero's nickname, Levsha (Lefty), has become a reference to an exceptionally skilled common-folk craftsman, and the expression "to shoe a flea" has become an idiomatic phrase signifying a craftsman's feat.

== Translations into English ==
- Isabel F. Hapgood (1916) as The Steel Flea
- Babette Deutsch and Avrahm Yarmolinsky (1943) as The Steel Flea
- David Magarshack (1946) as The Left-Handed Artificer
- George Hanna (1960) as Lefty: Being the Tale of Cross-Eyed Lefty of Tula and The Steel Flea
- William B. Edgerton (1969) as The Steel Flea
- Richard Pevear and Larissa Volokhonsky (2013) as Lefty
