= The Left-Hander (1987 film) =

- The Ukrainian release version of poster
- Directed by: Sergei Ovcharov
- Based on: The Left-Hander by Nikolai Leskov
- Starring: Nikolai Stotsky; Vladimir Gostyukhin; Leonid Kuravlyov; Yury Yakovlev; Lev Lemke
- Release date: 1987
- Country: Soviet Union
- Language: Russian

The Left-Hander (Russian: Левша, romanized: Levsha) is a 1987 Soviet comedy drama directed by Sergei Ovcharov, based on The Left-Hander by Nikolai Leskov. The film features Nikolai Stotsky, Vladimir Gostyukhin, and Leonid Kuravlyov.

== Plot ==
Emperor Alexander Pavlovich together with his faithful servant, Cossack Ataman Platov, come to London after the war of 1812. The British are trying to persuade the king to come on their side by showing him various inventions, but Platov insists that the Russians are more skillful.

One day the British demonstrate to the Emperor the nymphozoria – an iron flea that can dance.

Alexander leaves and a few months later he dies, leaving the flea to priest Fedota. His brother, Nikolai "Palkovic" tells Platov to look for artisans who will make better handiwork than the English flea. Ataman finds them, but Platov scolds the masters who put a horseshoe on the flea because the flea stops dancing after the procedure, and takes Lefty away with him who made nails for the flea without leaving him any identifying documents.

When the emperor understands everything, he orders to give the best clothing to Lefty and sends him abroad. The Left-Hander sees that the British do not clean guns with crushed bricks and asks to be sent back. But on the way he has drinks with the ship's skipper, and on arrival while inebriated and lacking identification is sent to the Obukhov Hospital for the destitute. There he dies, having said to Dr. Solski, "Tell the Emperor that the English do not clean their guns with brick; they should not clean this way either by us." But the doctor fearing threats of Count Chernyshev does not tell this to the emperor.

== Cast ==
- Nikolai Stotsky as The Left-Hander / Lefty
- Vladimir Gostyukhin as Ataman Platov
- Leonid Kuravlyov as Emperor Alexander I Pavlovich
- Yury Yakovlev as Emperor Nicholas I "Palkovic"
- Lev Lemke as Minister Kiselvrode
- Alexander Susnin as old blacksmith
- Sergey Parshin as Tula gunsmith
- Nikolai Lavrov as black gentleman
- Nikolai Kryukov as English admiral
- Victor Smirnov as skipper
- Anatoly Slivnik as policeman
- Viktor Bychkov as dandy
- Evgeny Baranov as clerk
- Konstantin Vorobyov as clerk
- Vladimir Zakharyev as clerk
- Arkadiy Koval as clerk
- Joseph Krinsky as courtier
- Olga Samoshina as court lady
- Stanislav Sokolov as slanderer journalist
- George Teyh as courtier
- Anatoly Khudoleev as cossack
- Nikolai Muravyov as maintainer
- Heliy Sysoev as singer
