= 2016 Big League World Series =

Tournament details
- Country: United States
- City: Easley, South Carolina
- Dates: 26 July – 2 August 2016
- Teams: 11

Final positions
- Champions: Taoyuan, Taiwan
- Runner-up: Maui, Hawaii

The 2016 Big League World Series was a youth baseball tournament that took place from July 26-August 2 in Easley, South Carolina, United States. Taoyuan, Taiwan defeated Maui, Hawaii in the championship game. It was the first BLWS title for Taiwan since 1996, and extended their overall record to 18.

On August 26, 2016 Little League announced the elimination of the "Big League" division in baseball, and softball. This made the 49th edition the final BLWS.

== Teams ==
United States	International
(South Carolina) Easley, South Carolina; District 1 Host	Taoyuan, Taiwan; Taoyuan County; Asia–Pacific
(Michigan) Grand Rapids, Michigan; District 9 Central	(Saskatchewan) Regina, Saskatchewan; District 1 Canada
(Delaware) Dover, Delaware; District 1 East	(Netherlands) Rotterdam, Netherlands; District 1 Europe–Africa
Clearwater, Florida; District 12; Southeast	(Curaçao) Willemstad, Curaçao; Hubenil/Willemstad; Latin America
(Texas) Montgomery, Texas; District 28; Southwest	Guayama, Puerto Rico; District 12; Puerto Rico
(Hawaii) Maui, Hawaii; Kihei; West	

== Results ==
United States Bracket

First Round
—	Hawaii	3
—	Delaware	2
—	Texas	1
—	South Carolina	6
Lower round 1
0–1	Delaware	1
1–1	South Carolina	10
0–1	Texas	1
0–1	Michigan	5

Second Round
—	Michigan	0
1–0	Hawaii	3
—	Florida	1
1–0	South Carolina	0
Lower round 2
2–1	South Carolina	4
1–1	Michigan	6

Semifinals
2–0	Hawaii	0
1–0	Florida	3
Lower final
2–1	Hawaii	5
2–1	Michigan	3

United States Championship
2–0	Florida	1
3–1	Hawaii	4

International Bracket

First Round
—	Curaçao	3
—	Canada	0
Lower round 1
0–1	Canada	1
0–1	Netherlands	8

Second Round
—	Taiwan	7
1–0	Curaçao	1
—	Netherlands	1
—	Puerto Rico	11
Lower round 2
1–1	Netherlands	3
1–1	Curaçao	9

Semifinals
1–0	Taiwan	7
1–0	Puerto Rico	0
Lower final
1–1	Puerto Rico	2
2–1	Curaçao	0

International Championship
2–0	Taiwan	3
2–1	Puerto Rico	0

Consolation round

—
1–2	Delaware	14
0–3	Canada	4

—
0–3	Texas	9
1–2	Netherlands	11

Elimination Round

Semifinals
2–0	Florida	1
3–1	Hawaii	4
2–0	Taiwan	3
2–1	Puerto Rico	0

World Championship
4–1	Hawaii	2
3–0	Taiwan	6

2016 Big League World Series Champions
Taoyuan County LL
Taoyuan, Taiwan
