= Big League World Series (Canada Region) =

Canada Region
- Most recent season or competition: 2016 Big League World Series
- Sport: Baseball
- Founded: 1969
- Folded: 2016
- No. of teams: 7
- Last champion: Regina, Saskatchewan
- Most titles: British Columbia (16)

The Big League World Series (BLWS) Canada Region was one of five International regions that sent teams to the World Series. The Big League division was discontinued by Little League Baseball after the 2016 BLWS. The region's participation in the BLWS had dated back to 1969.

== Canada Region Provinces ==
- Alberta
- British Columbia
- New Brunswick
- Nova Scotia
- Ontario
- Quebec
- Saskatchewan

== Region Champions ==
Year	City	BLWS	Record
1969	Fort William, Ontario	Round 1	0–2
1970	Thunder Bay, Ontario	Round 1	0–2
1971		Round 2	1–2
1972	Windsor, Ontario	Third Place	2–2
1973	Windsor, Ontario	Round 1	0–2
1974	Surrey, British Columbia	Fourth Place	3–2
1975	Windsor, Ontario	Round 3	1–2
1976	Windsor, Ontario	Round 1	0–2
1977	Calgary, Alberta	Round 3	1–2
1978	Ottawa, Ontario	Round 1	0–2
1979	Lethbridge, Alberta	Round 4	2–2
1980	Lethbridge, Alberta	Round 2	1–2
1981	Calgary, Alberta	Round 1	0–2
1982	Chateauguay, Quebec	Round 3	1–2
1983	Montreal, Quebec	Round 3	0–2
1984	Surrey, British Columbia	Round 3	0–2
1985	Windsor, Ontario	Round 4	1–2
1986	Ottawa, Ontario	Round 3	1–2
1987	Vancouver, British Columbia	Round 2	0–2
1988	Surrey, British Columbia	Round 2	0–2
1989	Surrey, British Columbia	Round 2	1–2
1990	Ottawa, Ontario	Round 1	0–2
1991	Surrey, British Columbia	Round 3	2–2
1992	Surrey, British Columbia	Round 3	2–2
1993	Surrey, British Columbia	Round 1	0–2
1994	Surrey, British Columbia	Round 3	2–2
1995	Surrey, British Columbia	Round 4	3–2
1996	Surrey, British Columbia	Int'l Final	3–2
1997	Ottawa, Ontario	Round 4	2–2
1998	Cape Breton, Nova Scotia	Int'l Final	2–2
1999	Fraser Valley, British Columbia (Host)	Runner-up	4–1
2000	Fraser Valley, British Columbia	Champions	4–1
2001	Surrey, British Columbia	Third Place	3–2
2002	Cape Breton, Nova Scotia	Pool stage	0–4
2003	Fraser Valley, British Columbia	Pool stage	1–3
2004	Cape Breton, Nova Scotia	Pool stage	0–4
2005	Ottawa, Ontario	Pool stage	1–3
2006	Fraser Valley, British Columbia	Pool stage	1–4
2007	Fraser Valley, British Columbia	Pool stage	1–3
2008	Fraser Valley, British Columbia	Pool stage	2–2
2009	Cape Breton, Nova Scotia	Pool stage	1–3
2010	Cape Breton, Nova Scotia	Pool stage	0–4
2011	Lethbridge, Alberta	Pool stage	1–3
2012	Windsor, Ontario	Pool stage	0–4
2013	Fraser Valley, British Columbia	Pool stage	0–4
2014	Montréal, Quebec	Pool stage	0–4
2015	Calgary, Alberta (Host)	Round 1	0–3
2016	Regina, Saskatchewan	Round 1	0–3

=== Results by Province ===
Province	Region Championships	BLWS Championships	BLWS Record	PCT
British Columbia	18	1	28–41	.406
Ontario	13	0	8–29	.216
Alberta	5	0	5–11	.313
Nova Scotia	5	0	3–17	.150
Quebec	3	0	1–8	.111
(British Columbia) (Alberta) Host Team(s)	2	0	4–4	.500
No Data	1	0	1–2	.333
Saskatchewan	1	0	0–3	.000
Total	48	1	50–115	.303

== See also ==
- Baseball awards § World

Canada Region in other Little League divisions

- Little League
- Intermediate League
- Junior League
- Senior League
