= 2012 Big League World Series =

Tournament details
- Country: United States
- City: Easley, South Carolina
- Dates: 25 July – 1 August 2012
- Teams: 11

Final positions
- Champions: San Juan, Puerto Rico
- Runner-up: Easley, South Carolina

The 2012 Big League World Series took place from July 25-August 1 in Easley, South Carolina, United States. San Juan, Puerto Rico defeated Easley, South Carolina in the championship game.

== Teams ==
United States	International
(South Carolina) Easley, South Carolina; District 1 Host	Muntinlupa, Philippines; Muntinlupa; Asia–Pacific
(Indiana) Fort Wayne, Indiana; District 10; Central	(Ontario) Windsor, Ontario; District 5 Canada
(New Jersey) Cumberland, New Jersey; District 3 East	(Italy) Friuli, Italy; Friuli Venezia Giulia; EMEA
(Florida) Dunedin, Florida; District 12; Southeast	(Venezuela) Maracaibo, Venezuela; District 1 Latin America
(Texas) Laredo. Texas; District 34; Southwest	San Juan, Puerto Rico; District 1 Puerto Rico
(California) Anaheim, California; District 46; West	

== Results ==
United States Group

Team	W	L	Rs	Ra
Indiana	4	0	23	4
South Carolina	3	1	16	7
California	3	1	12	13
Florida	1	3	11	15
New Jersey	1	3	11	24
Texas	0	4	6	16

	(California)	(Florida)	(Indiana)	(New Jersey)	(South Carolina)	(Texas)
California	–	5–4	1–8	2–1	–	4–0
Florida	4–5	–	1–3	–	2–4	4–3
Indiana	8–1	3–1	–	11–2	1–0	–
New Jersey	1–2	–	2–11	–	4–8	4–3
South Carolina	–	4–2	0–1	8–4	–	4–0
Texas	0–4	3–4	–	3–4	0–4	–

International Group

Team	W	L	Rs	Ra
Puerto Rico	4	0	43	2
Venezuela	3	1	20	17
Philippines	2	2	22	22
Italy	1	3	17	26
Canada	0	4	4	39

	(Canada)	(Italy)	(Philippines)	(Puerto Rico)	(Venezuela)
Canada	–	1–9	2–7	0–14	1–9
Italy	9–1	–	5–13	0–7	3–5
Philippines	7–2	13–5	–	2–9	0–6
Puerto Rico	14–0	7–0	9–2	–	13–0
Venezuela	9–1	5–3	6–0	0–13	–

Elimination Round

Semifinals
4–0	Indiana	2
3–1	South Carolina	6
4–0	Puerto Rico	10
3–1	Venezuela	1

World Championship
4–1	South Carolina	3
5–0	Puerto Rico	7

2012 Big League World Series Champions
District 1
San Juan, Puerto Rico
