= 2011 Big League World Series =

Baseball event in South Carolina, USA

Tournament details
- Country: United States
- City: Easley, South Carolina
- Dates: 27 July – 3 August 2011
- Teams: 11

Final positions
- Champions: Taylors, South Carolina
- Runner-up: San Juan, Puerto Rico

The 2011 Big League World Series of baseball took place from July 27 - August 3 in Easley, South Carolina, United States. Taylors, South Carolina defeated San Juan, Puerto Rico in the championship game.

== Teams ==
| United States | International |
|---|---|
| (South Carolina) Easley, South Carolina; District 1 Host | Makati, Philippines; Illam Central; Asia–Pacific |
| (Michigan) Grand Rapids, Michigan; District 9 Central | (Alberta) Lethbridge, Alberta; District 1 Canada |
| (New Jersey) Cumberland, New Jersey; District 3 East | (Netherlands) Rotterdam, Netherlands; District 1 EMEA |
| (South Carolina) Taylors, South Carolina; District 7 Southeast | (Puerto Rico) San Juan, Puerto Rico; District 2 Latin America |
| (Louisiana) Ruston. Louisiana; District 5 Southwest | Monterrey, Mexico; District 1 Mexico |
| (California) Hayward, California; District 45; West | |

== Results ==
United States Group

| Team | W | L | Rs | Ra |
|---|---|---|---|---|
| (South Carolina) Host | 4 | 0 | 24 | 16 |
| South Carolina | 2 | 2 | 18 | 12 |
| Louisiana | 2 | 2 | 19 | 18 |
| New Jersey | 2 | 2 | 23 | 26 |
| Michigan | 1 | 3 | 17 | 26 |
| California | 1 | 3 | 23 | 26 |

| | (California) | (Louisiana) | (Michigan) | (New Jersey) | (South Carolina) | (South Carolina) |
|---|---|---|---|---|---|---|
| California | – | 3–4 | 4–6 | 11–12 | 5–4 | – |
| Louisiana | 4–3 | – | – | 4–0 | 2–4 | 9–11 |
| Michigan | 6–4 | – | – | 5–6 | 4–10 | 2–6 |
| New Jersey | 12–11 | 0–4 | 6–5 | – | – | 5–6 |
| South Carolina | 4–5 | 4–2 | 10–4 | – | – | 0–1 |
| Host (South Carolina) | – | 11–9 | 6–2 | 6–5 | 1–0 | – |

International Group

| Team | W | L | Rs | Ra |
|---|---|---|---|---|
| Puerto Rico | 4 | 0 | 38 | 3 |
| Netherlands | 3 | 1 | 24 | 12 |
| Mexico | 2 | 2 | 24 | 8 |
| Canada | 1 | 3 | 8 | 51 |
| Philippines | 0 | 4 | 9 | 29 |

| | (Canada) | (Mexico) | (Netherlands) | (Philippines) | (Puerto Rico) |
|---|---|---|---|---|---|
| Canada | – | 0–15 | 0–14 | 8–6 | 0–16 |
| Mexico | 15–0 | – | 1–3 | 5–1 | 3–4 |
| Netherlands | 14–0 | 3–1 | – | 7–2 | 0–9 |
| Philippines | 6–8 | 1–5 | 2–7 | – | 0–9 |
| Puerto Rico | 16–0 | 4–3 | 9–0 | 9–0 | – |

Elimination Round

Semifinals
4–0 | (South Carolina) Host | 5
2–2 | South Carolina | 8
4–0 | Puerto Rico | 10
3–1 | Netherlands | 0

World Championship
3–2 | South Carolina | 9
5–0 | Puerto Rico | 7

2011 Big League World Series Champions
District 7
Taylors, South Carolina
