= Big League World Series (East Region) =

East Region
- Most recent season or competition: 2016 Big League World Series
- Sport: Baseball
- Founded: 1968
- Folded: never
- Country: United States
- Last champion: Dover, Delaware
- Most titles: New York (13)

The Big League World Series (BLWS) East Region was one of five United States regions that sent teams to the World Series. The Big League division was discontinued by Little League Baseball after the 2016 BLWS. The region's participation in the BLWS had dated back to 1968.

== East Region States ==
- Connecticut
- Delaware
- Maine
- Maryland
- Massachusetts
- New Hampshire
- New Jersey
- New York
- Pennsylvania
- Rhode Island
- Vermont
- Washington, D.C.

== Region Champions ==
Year	City	BLWS	Record
1968	(New York (state)) New Hyde Park, New York	Runner-up	2–2
1969	(New York (state)) New Hyde Park, New York	Round 1	0–2
1970	(New York (state)) New Hyde Park, New York	Third Place	3–2
1971	(New York (state)) New Hyde Park, New York	Third Place	2–2
1972	(New York (state)) New Hyde Park, New York	Fourth Place	2–2
1973	Dover, Delaware	Third Place	3–2
1974	Montgomery County, Pennsylvania	Round 2	1–2
1975	(New York (state)) Rockland County, New York	Round 2	1–2
1976	(New York (state)) Rockland County, New York	Round 2	0–2
1977	(New York (state)) West Hempstead, New York	Round 3	2–2
1978	Providence, Rhode Island	Round 2	0–2
1979	(New York (state)) West Hempstead, New York	Champions	4–0
1980	Providence, Rhode Island	Round 2	0–2
1981	Dover, Delaware	Round 4	1–2
1982	(New York (state)) Dutchess County, New York	Round 4	2–2
1983	(New York (state)) Rockland County, New York	Round 3	0–2
1984	Salisbury, Maryland	Round 2	0–2
1985	(New York (state)) Dutchess County, New York	Round 3	1–2
1986	Middletown, New Jersey	Round 3	1–2
1987	Georgetown, Delaware	Round 3	2–2
1988	Dover, Delaware (Host)	Round 4	1–2
1989	Dover, Delaware (Host)	Round 2	0–2
1990	Georgetown, Delaware	Fourth Place	2–2
1991	Millsboro, Delaware	Round 2	0–2
1992	Dover, Delaware (Host)	Fourth Place	3–2
1993	Sussex County, Delaware	Round 3	1–2
1994	Salisbury, Maryland	Round 1	0–2
1995	Dover, Delaware (Host)	Round 1	0–2
1996	Dover, Delaware (Host)	Round 2	1–2
1997	Williamsport, Pennsylvania	Round 2	0–2
1998	(New York (state)) Rockland County, New York	Round 3	1–2
1999	Dover, Delaware (Host)	Pool stage	1–3
2000	Bridgewater, New Jersey	Pool stage	2–2
2001	Williamsport, Pennsylvania	Pool stage	2–3
2002	Hughesville, Maryland	Runner-up	4–2
2003	Williamsport, Pennsylvania	Pool stage	0–4
2004	Williamsport, Pennsylvania	Runner-up	5–1
2005	Newark, Delaware	Pool stage	1–3
2006	Dover, Delaware (Host)	Pool stage	2–3
2007	Hughesville, Maryland	Pool stage	0–4
2008	Toms River, New Jersey	Pool stage	0–4
2009	Williamsport, Pennsylvania	Pool stage	2–2
2010	Cumberland, New Jersey	Pool stage	1–3
2011	Cumberland, New Jersey	Pool stage	2–2
2012	Cumberland, New Jersey	Pool stage	1–3
2013	Cumberland, New Jersey	Pool stage	1–3
2014	Kennett Square, Pennsylvania	Pool stage	1–3
2015	Dover, Delaware (Host)	Round 3	2–2
2016	Dover, Delaware (Host)	Round 1	1–2

=== Results by State ===
State	Region Championships	BLWS Championships	BLWS Record	PCT
(New York (state)) New York	13	1	20–24	.455
(Delaware) Host Team(s)	9	0	11–20	.355
Delaware	7	0	10–15	.400
Pennsylvania	7	0	11–17	.393
New Jersey	7	0	8–19	.296
Maryland	4	0	4–10	.286
Rhode Island	2	0	0–4	.000
Total	49	1	64–109	.370

== See also ==
East Region in other Little League divisions

- Little League – East 1957–2000
  - Little League – Mid-Atlantic
  - Little League – New England
- Intermediate League
- Junior League
- Senior League
