= 2010 Big League World Series =

Tournament details
- Country: United States
- City: Easley, South Carolina
- Dates: 28 July – 4 August 2010
- Teams: 11

Final positions
- Champions: San Juan, Puerto Rico
- Runner-up: Thousand Oaks, California

The 2010 Big League World Series took place from July 28 - August 4 in Easley, South Carolina, United States. San Juan, Puerto Rico defeated Thousand Oaks, California in the championship game.

== Teams ==
United States	International
(South Carolina) Easley, South Carolina; District 1 Host	(Philippines) Makati, Philippines; District 1 Asia–Pacific
(Illinois) Burbank, Illinois; District 15; Central	(Nova Scotia) Cape Breton, Nova Scotia; District 1 Canada
(New Jersey) Cumberland, New Jersey; District 3 East	(Netherlands) Rotterdam, Netherlands EMEA
(South Carolina) Taylors, South Carolina; District 7 Southeast	(Panama) Coclé, Panama; District 2 Latin America
(Louisiana) Ruston. Louisiana; District 5 Southwest	San Juan, Puerto Rico; District 1 Puerto Rico
(California) Thousand Oaks, California; District 13; West	

== Results ==
United States Group

Team	W	L	Rs	Ra
South Carolina	4	0	44	10
California	3	1	18	17
Louisiana	3	1	41	10
(South Carolina) Host	1	3	14	34
New Jersey	1	3	13	37
Illinois	0	4	6	28

	(California)	(Illinois)	(Louisiana)	(New Jersey)	(South Carolina)	(South Carolina)
California	–	9–3	5–2	–	0–10	4–2
Illinois	3–9	–	0–10	0–5	3–4	–
Louisiana	2–5	10–0	–	14–3	–	15–2
New Jersey	–	5–0	3–14	–	4–16	1–7
South Carolina	10–0	4–3	–	16–4	–	14–3
Host (South Carolina)	2–4	–	2–15	7–1	3–14	–

International Group

Team	W	L	Rs	Ra
Puerto Rico	4	0	23	7
Panama	3	1	18	11
Philippines	2	2	11	16
Netherlands	1	3	10	15
Canada	0	4	14	27

	(Canada)	(Netherlands)	(Panama)	(Philippines)	(Puerto Rico)
Canada	–	4–5	3–4	6–7	1–11
Netherlands	5–4	–	4–7	0–2	1–2
Panama	4–3	7–4	–	4–0	3–4
Philippines	7–6	2–0	0–4	–	2–6
Puerto Rico	11–1	2–1	4–3	6–2	–

Elimination Round

Semifinals
4–0	South Carolina	1
3–1	California	5
4–0	Puerto Rico	12
3–1	Panama	0

World Championship
4–1	California	2
5–0	Puerto Rico	3

2010 Big League World Series Champions
District 1
San Juan, Puerto Rico
