= Big League World Series =

Defunct annual children's baseball tournament

- Sport: Baseball
- Founded: 1968
- Folded: 2016
- No. of teams: 11
- Countries: International
- Last champions: Taoyuan, Taiwan
- Most titles: Taiwan (18)
- Website: LittleLeague.org

The Big League World Series was a baseball tournament for youth aged 15 to 18 years old that began in 1968. On August 26, 2016, Little League International announced that it was eliminating the Big League Level of both baseball and softball, citing low participation levels over the previous 15 years. It was patterned after the Little League World Series, which was named for the World Series in Major League Baseball. Most recently, the tournament was held in Easley, South Carolina.

The Big League World Series was held at four different sites.

- Winston-Salem, North Carolina 1968–1969
- Fort Lauderdale, Florida 1970–1998
- Tucson, Arizona 1999–2000
- Easley, South Carolina 2001–2016

== Tournament format ==
Pool A (U.S.) consisted of six regions (including the Host team):

- Central
- East
- Host
- Southeast
- Southwest
- West

Pool B (International) consisted of five regions:

- Asia–Pacific
- Canada
- Europe–Africa
- Latin America
- Mexico / Puerto Rico

== Champions ==
Year	Winner	Region	Score	Runner–Up	Region
1968	Charleston, West Virginia	South	3–2^{(F/9)}	(New York (state)) New Hyde Park, New York	East
1969	Barstow, Southern California	West	12–6	Winston-Salem, North Carolina	Host
1970	Lincolnwood, Illinois	North	6–0 & 10–5	San Fernando/Simi Valley, Southern California	West
1971	Cupertino, Northern California	West	2–0 & 4–0	Lincolnwood, Illinois	North
1972	Orlando, Florida	South	5–4	Inglewood, Southern California	West
1973	Lincolnwood, Illinois	North	8–0 & 6–2	Orange County, Southern California	West
1974	Taipei, Taiwan	Far East	2–0	San Antonio, Texas	South
1975	Taipei, Taiwan	Far East	2–1	San Antonio, Texas	South
1976	Taipei, Taiwan	Far East	4–0	Broward County, Florida	Host
1977	Taipei, Taiwan	Far East	4–1 & 4–0	Broward County, Florida	Host
1978	Taipei, Taiwan	Far East	4–1^{(F/13)}	Tampa, Florida	South
1979	(New York (state)) West Hempstead, New York	East	5–1	Orlando, Florida	South
1980	Buena Park, Southern California	West	3–2	Orlando, Florida	South
1981	Taipei, Taiwan	Far East	14–2	Puerto Rico	Puerto Rico
1982	Puerto Rico	Puerto Rico	2–0	Venezuela	Venezuela
1983	Taipei, Taiwan	Far East	7–0	Broward County, Florida	Host
1984	Taipei, Taiwan	Far East	6–4	Maracaibo, Venezuela	Venezuela
1985	Broward County, Florida	Host	9–1 & 10–8	Carolina, Puerto Rico	Puerto Rico
1986	Maracaibo, Venezuela	Venezuela	6–2 & 6–4	Broward County, Florida	Host
1987	Taipei, Taiwan	Far East	4–10 & 9–1	Broward County, Florida	Host
1988	Taipei, Taiwan	Far East	3–1 & 6–0	Broward County, Florida	Host
1989	Taipei, Taiwan	Far East	1–0	Maracaibo, Venezuela	Venezuela
1990	Taipei, Taiwan	Far East	12–1	Maracaibo, Venezuela	Venezuela
1991	Taipei, Taiwan	Far East	8–2	Maracaibo, Venezuela	Venezuela
1992	Broward County, Florida	Host	5–2 & 5–4	Maracaibo, Venezuela	Venezuela
1993	Taipei, Taiwan	Far East	7–0	Broward County, Florida	Host
1994	Taipei, Taiwan	Far East	3–2 & 11–4	Broward County, Florida	Host
1995	Tainan, Taiwan	Far East	6–1	Broward County, Florida	Host
1996	Kaohsiung, Taiwan	Far East	4–0	Burbank, Illinois	North
1997	Broward County, Florida	Host	15–3	Maracaibo, Venezuela	Venezuela
1998	Thousand Oaks, Southern California	West	10–9	Venezuela	Latin America
1999	Orlando, Florida	South	14–2	Fraser Valley, Canada	Canada
2000	Fraser Valley, Canada	Canada	9–8	Jeffersonville, Indiana	Central
2001	Westminster, Southern California	West	5–4	Valencia, Venezuela	Latin America
2002	San Juan, Puerto Rico	Latin America	7–2	Hughesville, Maryland	East
2003	Easley, South Carolina	Host	6–3	Thousand Oaks, Southern California	West
2004	Easley, South Carolina	Host	9–1	Williamsport, Pennsylvania	East
2005	Easley, South Carolina	Host	10–5	Thousand Oaks, Southern California	West
2006	Thousand Oaks, Southern California	West	10–0	San Juan, Puerto Rico	Puerto Rico
2007	Easley, South Carolina	Host	11–3	San Juan, Puerto Rico	Latin America
2008	Taylors, South Carolina	South	5–4	San Juan, Puerto Rico	Puerto Rico
2009	Santiago, Dominican Republic	Latin America	12–0	Thousand Oaks, Southern California	West
2010	San Juan, Puerto Rico	Puerto Rico	3–2	Thousand Oaks, Southern California	West
2011	Taylors, South Carolina	Southeast	9–7	San Juan, Puerto Rico	Latin America
2012	San Juan, Puerto Rico	Puerto Rico	7–3	Easley, South Carolina	Host
2013	Greenville County, South Carolina	Southeast	6–1	Maracaibo, Venezuela	Latin America
2014	Clearwater, Florida	Southeast	2–1	Guayama, Puerto Rico	Puerto Rico
2015	Guayama, Puerto Rico	Latin America	3–1	Thousand Oaks, Southern California	West
2016	Taoyuan, Taiwan	Asia–Pacific	6–2	Kihei, Hawaii	West
Year	Winner	Region	Score	Runner–Up	Region

=== Championships won by Country/State ===
Team	Championships	Last
Taiwan	18	2016
(Florida) (South Carolina) Host Team(s)	7	2007
Southern California	5	2006
Puerto Rico	5	2015
South Carolina	3	2013
Florida	3	2014
Illinois	2	1973
West Virginia	1	1968
Northern California	1	1971
(New York (state)) New York	1	1979
Venezuela	1	1986
Canada	1	2000
Dominican Republic	1	2009

== See also ==
- List of Little League World Series champions by division
- Baseball awards § World
