= 2013 Big League World Series =

Tournament details
- Country: United States
- City: Easley, South Carolina
- Dates: 24–31 July 2013
- Teams: 11

Final positions
- Champions: Greenville County, South Carolina
- Runner-up: Maracaibo, Venezuela

The 2013 Big League World Series took place from July 24–31 in Easley, South Carolina, United States. Greenville County, South Carolina defeated Maracaibo, Venezuela in the championship game.

== Teams ==
United States	International
(South Carolina) Easley, South Carolina; District 1 Host	(Taiwan) Taoyuan County, Taiwan; Taoyuan; Asia–Pacific
(Michigan) Grand Rapids, Michigan; District 9 Central	(British Columbia) Fraser Valley, British Columbia; District 3 Canada
(New Jersey) Cumberland, New Jersey; District 3 East	(Germany) Ramstein, Germany; District 2 EMEA
(South Carolina) Greenville County, South Carolina; District 7 Southeast	(Venezuela) Maracaibo, Venezuela; District 1 Latin America
(Texas) Spring, Texas; District 28; Southwest	Tlaquepaque, Mexico; Sutaj Alfarera; Mexico
(California) Thousand Oaks, California; District 13; West	

== Results ==
United States Group

Team	W	L	Rs	Ra
South Carolina	4	0	26	3
California	3	1	13	9
(South Carolina) Host	2	2	20	11
Michigan	2	2	19	17
New Jersey	1	3	11	15
Texas	0	4	13	42

	(California)	(Michigan)	(New Jersey)	(South Carolina)	(South Carolina)	(Texas)
California	–	7–5	3–2	1–6	2–1	–
Michigan	5–7	–	3–2	–	3–4	8–4
New Jersey	2–3	2–3	–	0–7	–	7–2
South Carolina	6–1	–	7–0	–	1–0	12–2
Host (South Carolina)	1–2	4–3	–	0–1	–	15–5
Texas	–	4–8	2–7	2–12	5–15	–

International Group

Team	W	L	Rs	Ra
Taiwan	4	0	32	4
Venezuela	3	1	26	12
Mexico	2	2	17	8
Germany	1	3	17	27
Canada	0	4	6	47

	(Canada)	(Germany)	(Mexico)	(Taiwan)	(Venezuela)
Canada	–	2–12	1–7	0–10	3–18
Germany	12–2	–	2–8	2–13	1–4
Mexico	7–1	8–2	–	1–2	1–3
Taiwan	10–0	13–2	2–1	–	7–1
Venezuela	18–3	4–1	3–1	1–7	–

Elimination Round

Semifinals
4–0	South Carolina	7
3–1	California	3
4–0	Taiwan	2
3–1	Venezuela (F/9)	3

World Championship
5–0	South Carolina	6
4–1	Venezuela	1

2013 Big League World Series Champions
District 7
Greenville County, South Carolina
