= 1974 Big League World Series =

Tournament details
- Country: United States
- City: Fort Lauderdale, Florida
- Dates: 10–17 August 1974
- Teams: 10

Final positions
- Champions: Taipei, Taiwan
- Runner-up: San Antonio, Texas

The 1974 Big League World Series took place from August 10–17 in Fort Lauderdale, Florida, United States. Taipei, Taiwan defeated San Antonio, Texas in the championship game.

This year saw the debut of the Far East, and Mexico regions.

== Teams ==
United States	International
(Florida) Broward County, Florida Host	Surrey, British Columbia Canada
(Pennsylvania) Montgomery County, Pennsylvania; District 22; East	(West Germany) West Germany Europe
(Illinois) Lincolnwood, Illinois North	(Taiwan) Taipei, Taiwan Far East
(Texas) San Antonio, Texas South	Mexico Mexico
(California) El Cajon, California West	(Puerto Rico) Puerto Rico Latin America

== Results ==
Upper round 1	Upper round 2	Upper round 3	Upper final	Final
1–0	Puerto Rico	0
—	Puerto Rico (F/11)	2	—	Taiwan	5
1–0	Taiwan	11
—	California	1
2–0	Canada	0
1–0	Canada	6
—	Canada	11	—	West Germany	4
2–0	Taiwan	3
—	Pennsylvania	3
2–0	Texas	0
—	Illinois	3
—	Florida	2
1–0	Illinois	1
1–0	Texas	8
—	Texas
—	Mexico (forfeit)	3–0	Taiwan	2	–
4–1	Texas	0	–
Lower round 1	Lower round 2	Lower round 3	Lower round 4	Lower final
1–1	Illinois	6
1–1	Puerto Rico	7	2–1	Puerto Rico	4
0–1	Mexico	1–1	West Germany	6	2–1	Illinois	1
0–1	West Germany	3–1	Texas	7
2–1	Texas	7
2–1	Canada	3–1	Canada	1
0–1	Florida (F/9)	6	1–1	Florida
0–1	California	1	1–1	Pennsylvania	3
0–1	Pennsylvania	5

1974 Big League World Series Champions
Taipei, Taiwan
