= 1985 Big League World Series =

Tournament details
- Country: United States
- City: Fort Lauderdale, Florida
- Dates: 10–17 August 1985
- Teams: 11

Final positions
- Champions: Broward County, Florida
- Runners-up: Carolina, Puerto Rico

The 1985 Big League World Series took place from August 10–17 in Fort Lauderdale, Florida, United States. Host team Broward County defeated Carolina, Puerto Rico twice in the championship game.

== Teams ==
United States	International
(Florida) Broward County, Florida; District 10; Host	Windsor, Ontario, Canada Canada
(New York (state)) Dutchess County, New York; Southern Dutchess East	(West Germany) Bonn West Germany Europe
(Michigan) Grand Rapids, Michigan North	(Taiwan) Taipei, Taiwan Far East
(Florida) Orlando, Florida South	Saltillo, Mexico Mexico
(Arizona) Tucson, Arizona West	Carolina, Puerto Rico Puerto Rico
	Maracaibo, Venezuela Venezuela

== Results ==
Upper round 1	Upper round 2	Upper round 3	Upper final	Final
1–0	Puerto Rico	3
—	Mexico	3	—	Taiwan	2
2–0	Puerto Rico	10
—	Puerto Rico	7
1–0	Venezuela	8
—	Venezuela (F/9)	6
—	Michigan	4
3–0	Puerto Rico	5
2–0	(Florida) Host	3
1–0	Arizona	7
—	Arizona	25	—	Canada	6
2–0	Arizona	2
—	West Germany	2
1–0	(Florida) Host	13
1–0	(New York (state)) New York	6
—	(New York (state)) New York	9	—	(Florida) Host	8
4–0	Puerto Rico	1	8
—	Florida	4
3–1	(Florida) Host	9	10
Lower round 1	Lower round 2	Lower round 3	Lower round 4	Lower round 5	Lower final
1–1	Venezuela	20
0–1	Canada	8	1–1	Canada	6	2–1	(Florida) Host	8
0–1	Taiwan	8	1–1	Taiwan	7	2–1	Venezuela	4	4–1	Michigan	3
0–1	Florida	2	3–1	Michigan	7
2–1	Arizona	1
1–1	(New York (state)) New York	4	2–1	Michigan	4
0–1	Michigan	7	1–1	Michigan	7
0–1	West Germany	4	1–1	Mexico	4
0–1	Mexico	5

1985 Big League World Series Champions
District 10
Broward County, Florida
