= Big League World Series (Central Region) =

Central Region
- Most recent season or competition: 2016 Big League World Series
- Sport: Baseball
- Founded: 1968
- Folded: 2016
- Country: United States
- Last champion: Grand Rapids, Michigan
- Most titles: Illinois (24)

The Big League World Series (BLWS) Central Region was one of five United States regions that sent teams to the World Series. The Big League division was discontinued by Little League Baseball after the 2016 BLWS. The region's participation in the BLWS had dated back to 1968, when it was known as the North Region.

== Central Region States ==
- Illinois
- Indiana
- Iowa
- Kansas
- Kentucky
- Michigan
- Minnesota
- Missouri
- Nebraska
- North Dakota
- Ohio
- South Dakota
- Wisconsin

== Region Champions ==
Year	City	BLWS	Record
1968	Indianapolis, Indiana	Round 1	0–2
1969	Lincolnwood, Illinois	Third Place	3–2
1970	Lincolnwood, Illinois	Champions	5–1
1971	Lincolnwood, Illinois	Runner-up	3–2
1972	Gary, Indiana	Round 1	0–2
1973	Lincolnwood, Illinois	Champions	5–1
1974	Lincolnwood, Illinois	Third Place	2–2
1975	Chicago, Illinois	Round 3	2–2
1976	Chicago, Illinois	Round 3	2–2
1977	Chicago, Illinois	Round 4	2–2
1978	Grand Rapids, Michigan	Round 4	2–2
1979	Chicago, Illinois	Fourth Place	2–2
1980	Chicago, Illinois	Round 4	2–2
1981	Chicago, Illinois	Third Place	3–2
1982	Grand Rapids, Michigan	Round 2	1–2
1983	Milwaukee, Wisconsin	Fourth Place	3–2
1984	Grand Rapids, Michigan	Round 4	2–2
1985	Grand Rapids, Michigan	Third Place	4–2
1986	Chicago, Illinois	Round 2	0–2
1987	Chicago Heights, Illinois	Round 3	0–2
1988	Grand Rapids, Michigan	Round 4	1–2
1989	Chicago, Illinois	Round 3	2–2
1990	Chicago, Illinois	Round 2	1–2
1991	Chicago, Illinois	Fourth Place	3–2
1992	Grand Rapids, Michigan	Round 1	0–2
1993	Grand Rapids, Michigan	Round 2	1–2
1994	Indianapolis, Indiana	Round 1	0–2
1995	Burbank, Illinois	Round 2	1–2
1996	Burbank, Illinois	Runner-up	3–2
1997	Burbank, Illinois	Round 1	0–2
1998	Jeffersonville, Indiana	Round 1	0–2
1999	Burbank, Illinois	Pool stage	1–3
2000	Jeffersonville, Indiana	Runner-up	4–2
2001	Jeffersonville, Indiana	Pool stage	1–4
2002	Jeffersonville, Indiana	Pool stage	3–1
2003	Burbank, Illinois	Pool stage	2–2
2004	Grand Rapids, Michigan (Host)	Semifinals	3–2
2005	Burbank, Illinois	Pool stage	2–2
2006	West Branch, Michigan	Pool stage	0–4
2007	Grand Rapids, Michigan (Host)	Pool stage	2–2
2008	Grand Rapids, Michigan (Host)	Pool stage	2–2
2009	Burbank, Illinois	Pool stage	1–3
2010	Burbank, Illinois	Pool stage	0–4
2011	Grand Rapids, Michigan (Host)	Pool stage	1–3
2012	Fort Wayne, Indiana	US Final	4–1
2013	Grand Rapids, Michigan (Host)	Pool stage	2–2
2014	Grand Rapids, Michigan (Host)	Pool stage	2–2
2015	Grand Rapids, Michigan (Host)	Round 2	1–2
2016	Grand Rapids, Michigan (Host)	Round 3	2–2

=== Results by state ===
State	Central Region Championships	BLWS Championships	BLWS Record	PCT
Illinois	24	2	47–50	.485
(Michigan) Host Team(s)	8	0	15–17	.469
Indiana	8	0	12–16	.429
Michigan	8	0	11–18	.379
Wisconsin	1	0	3–2	.600
Total	49	2	88–103	.461

== See also ==
- Baseball awards § Little League Baseball

Central Region in other Little League divisions

- Little League – Central 1957-2000
  - Little League – Great Lakes
  - Little League – Midwest
- Intermediate League
- Junior League
- Senior League
