= Big League World Series (West Region) =

West Region
- Most recent season or competition: 2016 Big League World Series
- Sport: Baseball
- Founded: 1968
- Folded: 2016
- No. of teams: 12
- Country: United States
- Last champions: Kihei, Hawaii
- Most titles: Southern California (28)

The Big League World Series (BLWS) West Region was one of five United States regions that sent teams to the World Series. The Big League division of Little League Baseball was discontinued after the 2016 World Series. The region's participation in the BLWS had dated back to 1968.

== West Region States ==
- Alaska
- Arizona
- Northern California
- Southern California
- Hawaii
- Idaho
- Montana
- Nevada
- Oregon
- Utah
- Washington
- Wyoming

== Region Champions ==
Year	City	BLWS	Record
1968	Barstow–Victorville, Southern California	Fourth Place	1–2
1969	Barstow, Southern California	Champions	4–0
1970	San Fernando/Simi Valley, Southern California	Runner-up	3–2
1971	Cupertino, Northern California	Champions	4–1
1972	Inglewood, Southern California	Runner-up	4–2
1973	West Orange County, Southern California	Runner-up	3–2
1974	El Cajon, Southern California	Round 1	0–2
1975	Aiea, Hawaii	Round 2	1–2
1976	Cupertino, Northern California	Fourth Place	3–2
1977	Hilo, Hawaii	Fourth Place	2–2
1978	Port Hueneme, Southern California	Third Place	3–2
1979	Tucson, Arizona	Round 3	1–2
1980	Buena Park, Southern California	Champions	5–0
1981	Villa Park, Southern California	Round 2	0–2
1982	Tucson, Arizona	Third Place	3–2
1983	Sacramento, Northern California	Round 4	2–2
1984	Sacramento, Northern California	Fourth Place	2–2
1985	Tucson, Arizona	Round 4	2–2
1986	San Bernardino, Southern California	Round 4	1–2
1987	Tucson, Arizona	Fourth Place	3–2
1988	Tucson, Arizona	Round 3	1–2
1989	San Leandro, Northern California	Round 1	0–2
1990	Grass Valley, Northern California	Round 3	1–2
1991	Norwalk, Southern California	Round 1	0–2
1992	Victorville, Southern California	Round 3	2–2
1993	Pearl City, Hawaii	US Final	2–2
1994	Victorville, Southern California	Third Place	2–2
1995	Aiea, Hawaii	US Final	3–2
1996	Pearl City, Hawaii	US Final	3–2
1997	Aiea, Hawaii	Round 3	1–2
1998	Thousand Oaks, Southern California	Champions	5–0
1999	Aiea, Hawaii	US Final	3–2
2000	Santee, Southern California	US Final	2–3
2001	Westminster, Southern California	Champions	5–1
2002	(Washington (state)) Auburn, Washington	Pool stage	1–3
2003	Thousand Oaks, Southern California	Runner-up	5–1
2004	Anaheim, Southern California	Semifinals	3–2
2005	Thousand Oaks, Southern California	Runner-up	4–2
2006	Thousand Oaks, Southern California	Champions	7–0
2007	Thousand Oaks, Southern California	US Final	4–1
2008	Anaheim, Southern California	US Final	3–2
2009	Thousand Oaks, Southern California	Runner-up	4–2
2010	Thousand Oaks, Southern California	Runner-up	4–2
2011	Alameda County, Northern California	Pool stage	1–3
2012	Anaheim, Southern California	Pool stage	3–1
2013	Thousand Oaks, Southern California	US Final	3–2
2014	Thousand Oaks, Southern California	Pool stage	2–2
2015	Thousand Oaks, Southern California	Runner-up	4–1
2016	Kihei, Hawaii	Runner-up	4–2

=== Results by State ===
State	Region Championships	BLWS Championships	BLWS Record	PCT
Southern California	28	5	86–44	.662
Hawaii	8	0	19–16	.543
Northern California	7	1	13–14	.481
Arizona	5	0	10–10	.500
(Washington (state)) Washington	1	0	1–3	.250
Total	49	6	129–87	.597

== See also ==
West Region in other Little League divisions

- Little League – West 1957-2000
  - Little League – Northwest
  - Little League – West
- Intermediate League
- Junior League
- Senior League
