= Cumberland-Hesstown, New Jersey =

Populated place in Camden County, New Jersey, US

- Census-designated place
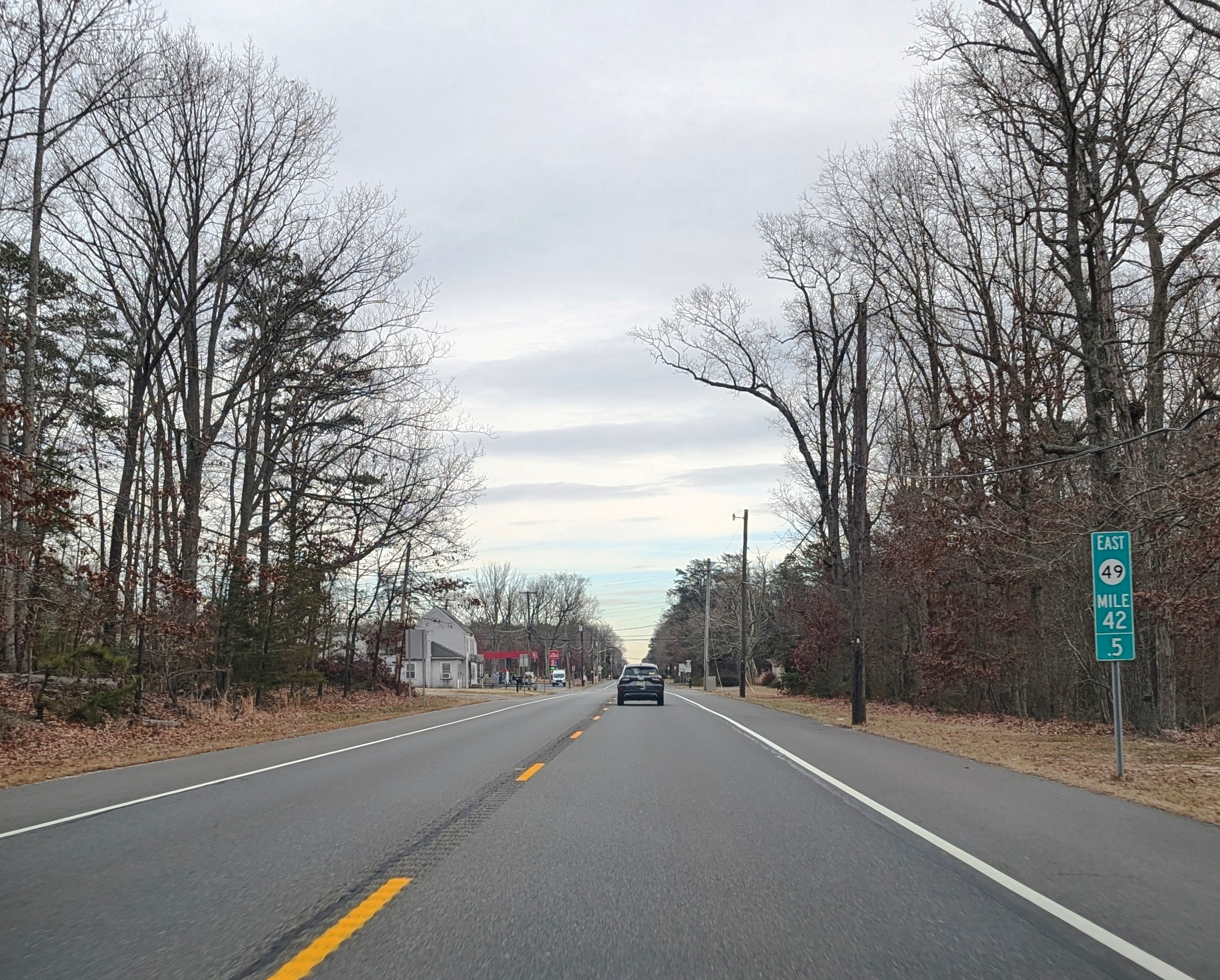
- Route 49 eastbound entering Hesstown

- Location in Cumberland County Location in New Jersey Location in the United States
- Coordinates: 39°22′0″N 74°56′10″W
- Country: United States
- State: New Jersey
- County: Cumberland
- Township: Maurice River

Area
  - Total: 2.55 sq mi (6.60 km^{2})
  - Land: 2.55 sq mi (6.60 km^{2})
  - Water: 0 sq mi (0.00 km^{2})
- Elevation: 75 ft (23 m)

Population (2020)
  - Total: 315
  - Density: 123.6/sq mi (47.72/km^{2})
- Time zone: UTC−05:00 (Eastern (EST))
  - Summer (DST): UTC−04:00 (EDT)
- ZIP Code: 08332 (Millville)
- Area code: 856
- FIPS code: 34-16278
- GNIS feature ID: 2806067

Cumberland-Hesstown is a census-designated place (CDP) located in the northern part of Maurice River Township in Cumberland County, in the U.S. state of New Jersey. Consisting of the unincorporated communities of Cumberland and Hesstown, it is in the eastern part of the county. New Jersey Route 49 passes through the CDP, leading northwest 6 miles (10 km) to Millville and southeast 11 miles (18 km) to Tuckahoe. As of the 2020 census, Cumberland-Hesstown had a population of 315.

The area was first listed as a CDP prior to the 2020 census.

== Demographics ==
Historical population
Census	Pop.	Note	%±
2020	315		—
U.S. Decennial Census; 2020

Cumberland-Hesstown first appeared as a census designated place in the 2020 U.S. census. As of 2020, the area had a population of 315.

Cumberland-Hesstown CDP, New Jersey – Racial and ethnic composition Note: the US Census treats Hispanic/Latino as an ethnic category. This table excludes Latinos from the racial categories and assigns them to a separate category. Hispanics/Latinos may be of any race.
Race / Ethnicity (NH = Non-Hispanic)	Pop 2020	2020
White alone (NH)	280	88.89%
Black or African American alone (NH)	2	0.63%
Native American or Alaska Native alone (NH)	0	0.00%
Asian alone (NH)	5	1.59%
Native Hawaiian or Pacific Islander alone (NH)	0	0.00%
Other race alone (NH)	0	0.00%
Mixed race or Multiracial (NH)	11	3.49%
Hispanic or Latino (any race)	17	5.40%
Total	315	100.00%

== Education ==
It is in the Maurice River Township School District.
