= 1983 Big League World Series =

Tournament details
- Country: United States
- City: Fort Lauderdale, Florida
- Dates: 13–20 August 1983
- Teams: 11

Final positions
- Champions: Taipei, Taiwan
- Runner-up: Broward County, Florida

The 1983 Big League World Series took place from August 13–20 in Fort Lauderdale, Florida, United States. Taipei, Taiwan defeated host Broward County, Florida in the championship game.

== Teams ==
United States	International
(Florida) Broward County, Florida Host	Canada
(New York (state)) Rockland County, New York East	(West Germany) Bonn, West Germany Europe
(Wisconsin) Milwaukee, Wisconsin North	(Taiwan) Taipei, Taiwan Far East
(Florida) Orlando, Florida South	Matamoros, Mexico Mexico
(California) Sacramento, California West	Puerto Rico Puerto Rico
	Maricaibo, Venezuela Venezuela

== Results ==
Upper round 1	Upper round 2	Upper round 3	Upper final	Final
1–0	Wisconsin	8
—	Wisconsin (F/5)	20	—	Mexico	1
2–0	Wisconsin	0
—	West Germany	1
1–0	(Florida) Host	3
—	(Florida) Host	7
—	Florida	3
2–0	(Florida) Host	1
3–0	Taiwan	13
1–0	Taiwan (F/5)	16
—	Taiwan	7	—	Canada	0
2–0	Taiwan	5
—	Puerto Rico	4
2–0	Venezuela	1
1–0	Venezuela	4
—	Venezuela	3	—	(New York (state)) New York	3
4–0	Taiwan	7	–
—	California	2
3–1	(Florida) Host	0	–
Lower round 1	Lower round 2	Lower round 3	Lower round 4	Lower round 5	Lower final
2–1	Wisconsin
0–1	Canada	0	2–1	California	2–1	(Florida) Host	4
0–1	California	7	1–1	California	10	3–1	Wisconsin	3	4–1	Venezuela	1
0–1	Mexico	2	3–1	Venezuela	5
2–1	Venezuela	8
0–1	(New York (state)) New York	2	2–1	Florida	7
0–1	Florida (F/13)	6	1–1	Florida	6
0–1	Puerto Rico (F/5)	13	1–1	Puerto Rico	5
0–1	West Germany	1

1983 Big League World Series Champions
Taipei, Taiwan
