= 1991 Big League World Series =

Tournament details
- Country: United States
- City: Fort Lauderdale, Florida
- Dates: 10–17 August 1991
- Teams: 11

Final positions
- Champions: Taipei, Taiwan
- Runner-up: Maracaibo, Venezuela

The 1991 Big League World Series took place from August 10–17 in Fort Lauderdale, Florida, United States. For the third consecutive year, Taipei, Taiwan defeated Maracaibo, Venezuela in the championship game. It was Taiwan's fifth straight championship.

== Teams ==
United States	International
(Florida) Broward County, Florida; District 10; Host	Surrey, British Columbia, Canada Canada
(Delaware) Millsboro, Delaware East	Panama Central America
(Illinois) Chicago, Illinois North	(Germany) Ramstein, Germany Europe
(Florida) Clearwater, Florida South	(Taiwan) Taipei, Taiwan Far East
(California) Norwalk, California West	Mayaguez, Puerto Rico Puerto Rico
	Maracaibo, Venezuela Venezuela

== Results ==
Upper round 1	Upper round 2	Upper round 3	Upper final	Final
1–0	(Florida) Host	12
—	(Florida) Host	3	—	Puerto Rico	2
2–0	(Florida) Host	1
—	Panama	0
1–0	Venezuela	12
—	Venezuela	7
—	California	5
2–0	Venezuela	5
3–0	Taiwan	9
1–0	Taiwan	7
—	Taiwan	8	—	Delaware	2
2–0	Taiwan (F/10)	2
—	Canada	1
2–0	Illinois	1
1–0	Illinois	13
—	Illinois (F/8)	1	—	Germany	2
—	Florida	0	4–0	Taiwan	8	–
3–1	Venezuela	2	–
Lower round 1	Lower round 2	Lower round 3	Lower round 4	Lower final
0–1	Puerto Rico	0
2–1	Illinois
0–1	Florida	8
1–1	Florida	2	2–1	Panama
2–1	Venezuela	8
1–1	Panama	8
0–1	California	3–1	Illinois	1	4–1	(Florida) Host	4
0–1	Panama	3–1	(Florida) Host	3
2–1	(Florida) Host	7
0–1	Delaware	1	2–1	Canada	1
0–1	Canada	7	1–1	Canada	4
0–1	Germany	3

1991 Big League World Series Champions
Taipei, Taiwan
