= Big League World Series (Europe–Africa Region) =

Europe–Africa Region
- Most recent season or competition: 2016 Big League World Series
- Sport: Baseball
- Founded: 1970
- Folded: 2016
- Last champions: Rotterdam, Netherlands
- Most titles: Germany (28)

The Big League World Series (BLWS) Europe–Africa Region was one of five International regions that sent teams to the World Series. Little League Baseball discontinued the Big League division in 2016. The region's participation in the BLWS had dated back to 1970.

== Europe-Africa Region Countries ==
- Belgium
- Czech Republic
- Germany
- Hungary
- Lithuania
- Netherlands
- Poland
- United Kingdom

== Region Champions ==
Year	City	BLWS	Record
1970	Rhineland-Palatinate, West Germany	Round 1	0–2
1971	Heidelberg, West Germany	Round 1	0–2
1972	Heidelberg, West Germany	Round 2	0–2
1973	West Germany	Round 1	0–2
1974	West Germany	Round 3	1–2
1975	West Germany	Round 1	0–2
1976	West Germany	Round 1	0–2
1977	West Germany	Round 1	0–2
1978	Frankfurt, West Germany	Round 4	1–2
1979	West Germany	Round 1	0–2
1980	West Germany	Round 1	0–2
1981	West Germany	Round 2	0–2
1982	West Germany	Round 1	0–2
1983	Bonn, West Germany	Round 1	0–2
1984	West Germany	Round 3	0–2
1985	Bonn, West Germany	Round 1	0–2
1986	Cairo, Egypt	Round 1	0–2
1987	Rota, Spain	Round 1	0–2
1988	Brussels, Belgium	Round 1	0–2
1989	Ramstein, West Germany	Round 1	0–2
1990	Ramstein, West Germany	Round 1	0–2
1991	Ramstein, Germany	Round 1	0–2
1992	Moscow, Russia	Round 2	0–2
1993	Ramstein, Germany	Round 3	0–2
1994	Ramstein, Germany	Round 1	0–2
1995	Ramstein, Germany	Round 1	0–2
1996	Ramstein, Germany	Round 1	0–2
1997	Utena, Lithuania	Round 2	0–2
1998	Dhahran, Saudi Arabia	Round 1	0–2
1999	Kaunas, Lithuania	Pool stage	0–3
2000	Warsaw, Poland	Pool stage	0–3
2001	Kyiv, Ukraine	Pool stage	1–3
2002	Ramstein, Germany	Pool stage	1–3
2003	South Africa	Pool stage	1–3
2004	Rotterdam, Netherlands	Pool stage	1–3
2005	Kutno, Poland	Pool stage	0–4
2006	Ramstein, Germany	Pool stage	1–3
2007	(Georgia (country)) Tbilisi, Georgia	Pool stage	0–4
2008	Ramstein, Germany	Pool stage	1–3
2009	Ramstein, Germany	Pool stage	0–4
2010	Rotterdam, Netherlands	Pool stage	1–3
2011	Rotterdam, Netherlands	Int'l Final	3–2
2012	Friuli, Italy	Pool stage	1–3
2013	Ramstein, Germany	Pool stage	1–3
2014	Rotterdam, Netherlands	Pool stage	1–3
2015	Rotterdam, Netherlands	Round 2	1–2
2016	Rotterdam, Netherlands	Round 2	2–2

=== Results by Country ===
Country	Region Championships	BLWS Championships	BLWS Record	PCT
Germany	28	0	6–62	.088
Netherlands	6	0	9–15	.375
Lithuania	2	0	0–5	.000
Poland	2	0	0–7	.000
Italy	1	0	1–3	.250
South Africa	1	0	1–3	.250
Ukraine	1	0	1–3	.250
Belgium	1	0	0–2	.000
Egypt	1	0	0–2	.000
Russia	1	0	0–2	.000
Saudi Arabia	1	0	0–2	.000
Spain	1	0	0–2	.000
(Georgia (country)) Georgia	1	0	0–4	.000
Total	47	0	18–112	.138

== See also ==
Europe–Africa Region in other Little League divisions

- Little League
- Intermediate League
- Junior League
- Senior League
