= 1987 Big League World Series =

Tournament details
- Country: United States
- City: Fort Lauderdale, Florida
- Dates: 15–22 August 1987
- Teams: 11

Final positions
- Champions: Taipei, Taiwan
- Runner-up: Broward County, Florida

The 1987 Big League World Series took place from August 15–22 in Fort Lauderdale, Florida, United States. Taipei, Taiwan defeated Broward County, Florida in the championship game.

== Teams ==
United States	International
(Florida) Broward County, Florida; District 10; Host	Vancouver, British Columbia, Canada Canada
(Delaware) Georgetown, Delaware East	(Spain) Rota, Spain Europe
(Illinois) Chicago Heights, Illinois North	(Taiwan) Taipei, Taiwan Far East
(Florida) Dunedin, Florida South	Monterrey, Mexico Mexico
(Arizona) Tucson, Arizona West	San Juan, Puerto Rico Puerto Rico
	Maracaibo, Venezuela Venezuela

== Results ==
Upper round 1	Upper round 2	Upper round 3	Upper final	Final
1–0	(Florida) Host	5
—	(Florida) Host	22	—	Arizona	4
2–0	(Florida) Host	4
—	Spain	2
1–0	Venezuela	0
—	Venezuela	14
—	Canada	3
3–0	(Florida) Host	0
3–0	Taiwan	2
1–0	Puerto Rico	7
—	Puerto Rico	7	—	Illinois	4
2–0	Puerto Rico	1
—	Delaware	6
2–0	Taiwan	12
1–0	Taiwan
—	Taiwan	—	Florida
4–0	Taiwan	4	9
—	Mexico
4–1	(Florida) Host	10	1
Lower round 1	Lower round 2	Lower round 3	Lower round 4	Lower round 5	Lower final
1–1	Venezuela	8
0–1	Illinois	7	2–1	Arizona	9	3–1	(Florida) Host	9
0–1	Arizona	5	1–1	Arizona	13	3–1	Arizona	5	3–1	Florida	4
0–1	Mexico	4	2–1	Florida	11
2–1	Puerto Rico	7
0–1	Florida	10	1–1	Florida	10
0–1	Canada	4	2–1	Delaware	9
0–1	Spain	0	1–1	Delaware	12
0–1	Delaware	20

1987 Big League World Series Champions
Taipei, Taiwan
