= 2006 Big League World Series =

Tournament details
- Country: United States
- City: Easley, South Carolina
- Dates: 29 July – 5 August 2006
- Teams: 11

Final positions
- Champions: Thousand Oaks, California
- Runners-up: San Juan, Puerto Rico

The 2006 Big League World Series took place from July 29-August 5 in Easley, South Carolina, United States. Thousand Oaks, California defeated San Juan, Puerto Rico in the championship game.

== Teams ==
United States	International
(South Carolina) Easley, South Carolina; District 1 Host	(Guam) Yona, Guam; District 1 Asia–Pacific
(Michigan) West Branch, Michigan; District 8 Central	(British Columbia) Fraser Valley, British Columbia; District 3 Canada
(Delaware) Dover, Delaware; District 1 East	(Germany) Ramstein, Germany; District 2 EMEA
(Florida) Fort Lauderdale, Florida; District 21; Southeast	(Panama) Coclé, Panama; District 2 Latin America
(Louisiana) Ruston, Louisiana; District 5 Southwest	San Juan, Puerto Rico; District 1 Puerto Rico
(California) Thousand Oaks, California; District 13; West	

== Results ==
Group A

Team	W	L	Rs	Ra
California	5	0	52	22
Puerto Rico	4	1	28	19
Delaware	2	3	42	37
Florida	2	3	61	43
Guam	1	4	19	57
Canada	1	4	21	45

	(California)	(Canada)	(Delaware)	(Florida)	(Guam)	(Puerto Rico)
California	–	14–4	10–0	12–9	6–4	10–5
Canada	4–14	–	5–4	4–13	5–8	3–6
Delaware	0–10	4–5	–	21–14	14–3	3–5
Florida	9–12	13–4	14–21	–	23–3	2–3
Guam	4–6	8–5	3–14	3–23	–	1–9
Puerto Rico	5–10	6–3	5–3	3–2	9–1	–

Group B

Team	W	L	Rs	Ra
South Carolina	4	0	23	5
Louisiana	3	1	45	17
Panama	2	2	41	17
Germany	1	3	12	39
Michigan	0	4	12	55

	(Germany)	(Louisiana)	(Michigan)	(Panama)	(South Carolina)
Germany	–	3–14	9–7	0–12	0–6
Louisiana	14–3	–	18–1	10–9	3–4^{(9)}
Michigan	7–9	1–18	–	4–18	0–10
Panama	12–0	9–10	18–4	–	2–3^{(11)}
South Carolina	6–0	4–3^{(9)}	10–0	3–2^{(11)}	–

Elimination Round

Semifinals
5–0	California	8
3–1	Louisiana	0
4–0	South Carolina	1
4–1	Puerto Rico	6

World Championship
6–0	California	10
5–1	Puerto Rico	0

2006 Big League World Series Champions
District 13
Thousand Oaks, California
