= 2008 Big League World Series =

Tournament details
- Country: United States
- City: Easley, South Carolina
- Dates: 26 July – 2 August 2008
- Teams: 11

Final positions
- Champions: Taylors, South Carolina
- Runner-up: San Juan, Puerto Rico

The 2008 Big League World Series took place from July 26-August 2 in Easley, South Carolina, United States. Taylors, South Carolina defeated San Juan, Puerto Rico in the championship game.

== Teams ==
United States	International
(South Carolina) Easley, South Carolina; District 1 Host	(Northern Mariana Islands) Saipan, Northern Mariana Islands; Saipan; Asia–Pacific
(Michigan) Grand Rapids, Michigan; District 9 Central	(British Columbia) Fraser Valley, British Columbia; District 3 Canada
(New Jersey) Toms River, New Jersey; District 18; East	(Germany) Ramstein, Germany; District 2 EMEA
(South Carolina) Taylors, South Carolina; District 7 South	(Dominican Republic) Santiago, Dominican Republic; Los Bravos de Pontezuela; Latin America
(Louisiana) Ruston, Louisiana; District 5 Southwest	San Juan, Puerto Rico; District 1 Puerto Rico
(California) Anaheim, California; District 46; West	

== Results ==
United States Group

Team	W	L	Rs	Ra
South Carolina	3	1	16	10
California	3	1	21	14
(South Carolina) Host	3	1	22	18
Michigan	2	2	24	24
Louisiana	1	3	28	33
New Jersey	0	4	16	26

	(California)	(Louisiana)	(Michigan)	(New Jersey)	(South Carolina)	(South Carolina)
California	–	–	13–5	4–2	1–5	3–2 ^{(12)}
Louisiana	–	–	8–12	8–4	6–9	6–8
Michigan	5–13	12–8	–	6–1	1–2	–
New Jersey	2–4	4–8	1–6	–	–	9–10
South Carolina	5–1	9–6	2–1	–	–	0–2
Host (South Carolina)	2–3 ^{(12)}	8–6	–	10–9	2–0	–

International Group

Team	W	L	Rs	Ra
Dominican Republic	3	0	28	9
Puerto Rico	3	0	35	10
Canada	2	2	29	20
Germany	1	3	24	23
Northern Mariana Islands	0	4	5	59

	(Canada)	(Dominican Republic)	(Germany)	(Northern Mariana Islands)	(Puerto Rico)
Canada	–	3–4	7–4	12–2	7–10
Dominican Republic	4–3	–	8–5	16–1	ppd.
Germany	4–7	5–8	–	12–2	3–6
Northern Mariana Islands	2–12	1–16	2–12	–	0–19
Puerto Rico	10–7	ppd.	6–3	19–0	–

Elimination Round

Semifinals
3–1	South Carolina	8
3–1	California	6
3–0	Dominican Republic	6
3–0	Puerto Rico	9

World Championship
4–1	South Carolina	5
4–0	Puerto Rico	4

2008 Big League World Series Champions
District 7
Taylors, South Carolina
