= 1988 Big League World Series =

Tournament details
- Country: United States
- City: Fort Lauderdale, Florida
- Dates: 13–20 August 1988
- Teams: 11

Final positions
- Champions: Taipei, Taiwan
- Runner-up: Broward County, Florida

The 1988 Big League World Series took place from August 13–20 in Fort Lauderdale, Florida, United States. In a championship rematch, Taipei, Taiwan defeated host Broward County, Florida twice in the championship game. It was Taiwan's second straight championship.

== Teams ==
| United States | International |
|---|---|
| (Florida) Broward County, Florida; District 10; Host | Surrey, British Columbia, Canada Canada |
| (Delaware) Dover, Delaware East | (Belgium) Brussels, Belgium Europe |
| (Michigan) Grand Rapids, Michigan North | (Taiwan) Taipei, Taiwan Far East |
| (Florida) Tampa, Florida South | Mexico Mexico |
| (Arizona) Tucson, Arizona West | Puerto Rico Puerto Rico |
| | Venezuela Venezuela |

== Results ==
Upper round 1 | Upper round 2 | Upper round 3 | Upper final | Final
1–0 | (Florida) Host | 12
— | (Florida) Host | 18 | — | Venezuela | 1
2–0 | (Florida) Host | 5
— | Belgium | 2
1–0 | Michigan | 3
— | Michigan | 10
— | Mexico | 3
3–0 | (Florida) Host | 5
3–0 | Taiwan | 0
1–0 | Arizona | 0
— | Arizona (F/9) | 6 | — | Florida | 1
1–0 | Florida | 1
— | Puerto Rico | 5
2–0 | Taiwan | 3
1–0 | Taiwan | 4
— | Taiwan | 4 | — | Delaware | 1
4–0 | (Florida) Host | 1 | 0
— | Canada | 3
4–1 | Taiwan | 3 | 6
Lower round 1 | Lower round 2 | Lower round 3 | Lower round 4 | Lower round 5 | Lower final
1–1 | Michigan | 2
1–1 | Arizona | 3 | 2–1 | Venezuela | 4 | 3–1 | Taiwan | 9
0–1 | Venezuela | 12 | 1–1 | Venezuela | 4 | 3–1 | Venezuela | 2 | 3–1 | Florida | 0
0–1 | Canada | 3 | 2–1 | Florida | 8
1–1 | Florida | 2
0–1 | Delaware (F/8) | 6 | 1–1 | Delaware | 0
0–1 | Mexico | 6 | 2–1 | Puerto Rico | 5
0–1 | Belgium | 0 | 1–1 | Puerto Rico (F/10) | 8
0–1 | Puerto Rico | 10

1988 Big League World Series Champions
Taipei, Taiwan
