= 2014 Big League World Series =

Tournament details
- Country: United States
- City: Easley, South Carolina
- Dates: 23–30 July 2014
- Teams: 11

Final positions
- Champions: Clearwater, Florida
- Runner-up: Guayama, Puerto Rico

The 2014 Big League World Series took place from July 23–30 in Easley, South Carolina, United States. Clearwater, Florida defeated Guayama, Puerto Rico in the championship game.

== Teams ==
United States	International
(South Carolina) Easley, South Carolina; District 1 Host	(Taiwan) Taoyuan County, Taiwan; Taoyuan; Asia–Pacific
(Michigan) Grand Rapids, Michigan; District 9 Central	(Quebec) Montréal, Quebec; District 3 Canada
(Pennsylvania) Kennett Square, Pennsylvania; District 28; East	(Netherlands) Rotterdam, Netherlands Europe–Africa
(Florida) Clearwater, Florida; District 12; Southeast	(Venezuela) Maracaibo, Venezuela; District 3 Latin America
(Texas) Spring, Texas; District 28; Southwest	Guayama, Puerto Rico; District 13; Puerto Rico
(California) Thousand Oaks, California; District 13; West	

== Results ==
United States Group

Team	W	L	Rs	Ra
South Carolina	3	1	26	18
Florida	3	1	24	21
Michigan	2	2	12	22
California	2	2	15	15
Pennsylvania	1	3	6	10
Texas	1	3	17	16

	(California)	(Florida)	(Michigan)	(Pennsylvania)	(South Carolina)	(Texas)
California	–	4–6	1–2	3–1	7–3	–
Florida	6–4	–	–	4–3	6–7	8–7
Michigan	2–1	–	–	3–1	4–11	2–9
Pennsylvania	1–3	3–4	1–3	–	–	1–0
South Carolina	3–7	7–6	11–4	–	–	5–1
Texas	–	7–8	9–2	0–1	1–5	–

International Group

Team	W	L	Rs	Ra
Puerto Rico	4	0	32	9
Venezuela	3	1	14	8
Taiwan	2	2	29	10
Netherlands	1	3	17	31
Canada	0	4	4	38

	(Canada)	(Netherlands)	(Puerto Rico)	(Taiwan)	(Venezuela)
Canada	–	2–10	0–9	1–11	1–8
Netherlands	10–2	–	5–12	1–13	1–4
Puerto Rico	9–0	12–5	–	6–4	5–0
Taiwan	11–1	13–1	4–6	–	1–2^{(9)}
Venezuela	8–1	4–1	0–5	2–1^{(9)}	–

Elimination Round

Semifinals
3–1	South Carolina	0
3–1	Florida	6
4–0	Puerto Rico	3
3–1	Venezuela	0

World Championship
4–1	Florida	2
5–0	Puerto Rico	1

2014 Big League World Series Champions
District 12
Clearwater, Florida
