= 1981 Big League World Series =

Tournament details
- Country: United States
- City: Fort Lauderdale, Florida
- Dates: 15–22 August 1981
- Teams: 11

Final positions
- Champions: Taipei, Taiwan
- Runner-up: Puerto Rico

The 1981 Big League World Series took place from August 15–22 in Fort Lauderdale, Florida, United States. Taipei, Taiwan defeated Puerto Rico in the championship game.

== Teams ==
United States	International
(Florida) Broward County, Florida Host	Calgary, Alberta Canada
(Delaware) Dover, Delaware East	(West Germany) West Germany Europe
(Illinois) Chicago, Illinois North	(Taiwan) Taipei, Taiwan Far East
(Florida) Miami, Florida South	Mexico Mexico
(California) Villa Park, California; District 30; West	Puerto Rico Puerto Rico
	Venezuela Venezuela

== Results ==
Upper round 1	Upper round 2	Upper round 3	Upper final	Final
1–0	Taiwan	7
—	Taiwan	7	—	Puerto Rico	0
2–0	Taiwan	4
—	Canada	0
1–0	Delaware	2
—	Delaware	3
—	West Germany	1
3–0	Taiwan	4
3–0	Illinois	0
1–0	(Florida) Host	6
—	(Florida) Host	6	—	Mexico	1
2–0	(Florida) Host	2
—	California	4
2–0	Illinois	10
1–0	Illinois	8
—	Venezuela	1	—	Florida	2
4–0	Taiwan	14	–
—	Illinois	10
5–1	Puerto Rico	2	–
Lower round 1	Lower round 2	Lower round 3	Lower round 4	Lower round 5	Lower final
1–1	Delaware	0
0–1	Florida	1	2–1	Puerto Rico	4	3–1	Illinois	3
0–1	California	4	1–1	Puerto Rico	3	3–1	Puerto Rico	3	4–1	Puerto Rico	10
0–1	Puerto Rico	6	3–1	(Florida) Host	2
2–1	(Florida) Host	5
0–1	Mexico	7	3–1	Venezuela	4
0–1	West Germany	2	2–1	Venezuela	11
0–1	Venezuela	1–1	Venezuela	9
0–1	Canada

1981 Big League World Series Champions
Taipei, Taiwan
