= Big League World Series (South Region) =

Southeast Region
- Most recent season or competition: 2016 Big League World Series
- Formerly: South Region
- Sport: Baseball
- Founded: 2002
- Folded: 2016
- No. of teams: 8
- Country: United States
- Last champion: Clearwater, Florida
- Most titles: South Carolina; Florida (5)

Southwest Region
- Most recent season or competition: 2016 Big League World Series
- Formerly: South Region
- Sport: Baseball
- Founded: 2002
- Folded: 2016
- No. of teams: 8
- Country: United States
- Last champions: Montgomery, East Texas
- Most titles: Host Team(s); Louisiana; East Texas (4)

The Big League World Series (BLWS) Southeast and Southwest regions were two of five United States regions that sent teams to the Big League World Series. The region's participation in the BLWS dated back to 1968 when it was known as the South Region. The Big League division of Little League Baseball was discontinued after the 2016 World baseball Series.

== South Region States ==
In 2002 the region was split in half.

Southeast

- Alabama
- Florida
- (Georgia (U.S. state)) Georgia
- North Carolina
- South Carolina
- Tennessee
- Virginia
- West Virginia

Southwest

- Arkansas
- Colorado
- Louisiana
- Mississippi
- New Mexico
- Oklahoma
- Texas (East)
- Texas (West)

== Region Champions ==
South Region
- Most recent season or competition: 2001 Big League World Series
- Formerly: South Region
- Sport: Baseball
- Founded: 1968
- Folded: 2001
- Country: United States
- Last champions: Dunedin, Florida
- Most titles: Florida (20)

=== South Region Champions ===
Year	City	BLWS	Record
1968	Charleston, West Virginia	Champions	4–0
1969	Fort Lauderdale, Florida	Fourth Place	1–2
1970	Charleston, West Virginia	Round 2	1–2
1971	Kernersville, North Carolina	Round 2	1–2
1972	Orlando, Florida	Champions	3–0
1973	Winston-Salem, North Carolina	Round 2	1–2
1974	San Antonio, Texas	Runner-up	4–2
1975	San Antonio, Texas	Runner-up	5–2
1976	San Antonio, Texas	Third Place	2–2
1977	Fernandina Beach, Florida	Third Place	3–2
1978	Tampa, Florida	Runner-up	3–2
1979	Orlando, Florida	Runner-up	3–2
1980	Orlando, Florida	Runner-up	5–2
1981	Miami, Florida	Round 3	0–2
1982	Tampa, Florida	Fourth Place	3–2
1983	Orlando, Florida	Round 4	2–2
1984	Orlando, Florida	Third Place	3–2
1985	Orlando, Florida	Round 2	0–2
1986	Beaumont, Texas	Third Place	2–2
1987	Dunedin, Florida	Third Place	3–2
1988	Tampa, Florida	Third Place	3–2
1989	Orlando, Florida	Round 1	0–2
1990	Fernandina Beach, Florida	Round 3	2–2
1991	Clearwater, Florida	Round 2	1–2
1992	Bristol, Virginia	Round 2	1–2
1993	Broward County, Florida	Round 1	0–2
1994	Victoria, Texas	Round 2	1–2
1995	(Georgia (U.S. state)) Macon, Georgia	Round 3	1–2
1996	Midland, Texas	Round 1	0–2
1997	Melbourne, Florida	US Final	3–2
1998	(Georgia (U.S. state)) Macon, Georgia	US Final	2–2
1999	Orlando, Florida	Champions	6–0
2000	Roanoke, Virginia	Pool stage	1–3
2001	Dunedin, Florida	Pool stage	3–1

==== Results by State ====
State	Region Championships	BLWS Championships	BLWS Record	PCT
Florida	20	2	47–35	.573
Texas	6	0	14–12	.538
West Virginia	2	1	5–2	.714
(Georgia (U.S. state)) Georgia	2	0	3–4	.429
North Carolina	2	0	2–4	.333
Virginia	2	0	2–5	.286
Total	34	3	73–62	.541

=== Southeast Region Champions ===
Year	City	BLWS	Record
2002	Virginia Beach, Virginia	Semifinals	4–1
2003	Dunedin, Florida (Host)	Semifinals	3–2
2004	Virginia Beach, Virginia	Pool stage	2–2
2005	Dunedin, Florida (Host)	Semifinals	4–1
2006	Fort Lauderdale, Florida (Host)	Pool stage	2–3
2007	Taylors, South Carolina	Pool stage	2–2
2008	Taylors, South Carolina	Champions	5–1
2009	Vero Beach, Florida	Pool stage	0–4
2010	Taylors, South Carolina	US Final	4–1
2011	Taylors, South Carolina	Champions	4–2
2012	Dunedin, Florida	Pool stage	1–3
2013	Greenville County, South Carolina	Champions	6–0
2014	Clearwater, Florida	Champions	5–1
2015	Dunedin, Florida	Round 1	1–2
2016	Clearwater, Florida	US Final	2–1

=== Southwest Region Champions ===
Year	City	BLWS	Record
2002	Ruston, Louisiana	Pool stage	2–2
2003	Brenham, East Texas	Semifinals	3–2
2004	Ruston, Louisiana	Pool stage	2–2
2005	Biloxi, Mississippi	Pool stage	1–3
2006	Ruston, Louisiana	Semifinals	3–2
2007	Ruston, Louisiana	Pool stage	1–3
2008	Ruston, Louisiana (Host)	Pool stage	1–3
2009	Ruston, Louisiana (Host)	US Final	4–1
2010	Ruston, Louisiana (Host)	Pool stage	3–1
2011	Ruston, Louisiana (Host)	Pool stage	2–2
2012	Laredo, West Texas	Pool stage	0–4
2013	Spring, East Texas	Pool stage	0–4
2014	Spring, East Texas	Pool stage	1–3
2015	Garland, West Texas	Round 1	0–3
2016	Montgomery, East Texas	Round 1	0–3

==== Results by State ====
State	Region Championships	BLWS Championships	W–L	PCT
South Carolina	5	3	21–6	.778
Florida	5	1	9–11	.450
(Florida) Host Team(s)	3	0	9–6	.600
Virginia	2	0	6–3	.667
Total	15	4	45–26	.634

State	Region Championships	BLWS Championships	W–L	PCT
(Louisiana) Host Team(s)	4	0	10–7	.588
Louisiana	4	0	8–9	.471
East Texas	4	0	4–12	.250
West Texas	2	0	0–7	.000
Mississippi	1	0	1–3	.250
Total	15	0	23–38	.377

== See also ==
South Region in other Little League divisions

- Little League – South 1957-2000
  - Little League – Southeast
  - Little League – Southwest
- Intermediate League
- Junior League
- Senior League
