= 1978 Big League World Series =

Tournament details
- Country: United States
- City: Fort Lauderdale, Florida
- Dates: 12–19 August 1978
- Teams: 11

Final positions
- Champions: Taipei, Taiwan
- Runner-up: Tampa, Florida

The 1978 Big League World Series took place from August 12–19 in Fort Lauderdale, Florida, United States. Taipei, Taiwan defeated Tampa, Florida in the championship game. It was Taiwan's fifth straight championship.

This year featured the debut of the Venezuela region.

== Teams ==
United States	International
(Florida) Broward County, Florida Host	Ottawa, Ontario Canada
(Rhode Island) Providence, Rhode Island East	(West Germany) Frankfurt, West Germany Europe
(Michigan) Grand Rapids, Michigan North	(Taiwan) Taipei, Taiwan Far East
(Florida) Tampa, Florida South	Monterrey, Mexico Mexico
(California) Port Hueneme, California West	Puerto Rico Puerto Rico
	Venezuela Venezuela

== Results ==
Upper round 1	Upper round 2	Upper round 3	Upper final	Final
1–0	Mexico	3
—	Mexico	—	Florida	9
1–0	Florida
—	Puerto Rico
1–0	California
—	California	8
—	Rhode Island	2
2–0	Florida	1
3–0	Taiwan	2
1–0	Taiwan	4
—	(Florida) Host	0	—	Venezuela	1
2–0	Taiwan
—	Taiwan	13
2–0	Michigan
1–0	Michigan	4
—	Michigan	11	—	West Germany	3
4–0	Taiwan (F/13)	4	–
—	Canada	5
3–1	Florida	1	–
Lower round 1	Lower round 2	Lower round 3	Lower round 4	Lower round 5	Lower final
1–1	California	21
0–1	West Germany	6	1–1	West Germany	1	2–1	Florida	3
0–1	Puerto Rico	9	1–1	Venezuela	0	2–1	California	4	3–1	California	2
0–1	Venezuela	10	4–1	(Florida) Host	2
2–1	Michigan	1
1–1	Mexico	1	3–1	(Florida) Host	5
0–1	Rhode Island	3	2–1	(Florida) Host	10
0–1	(Florida) Host (F/5)	23	1–1	(Florida) Host	6
0–1	Canada	0

1978 Big League World Series Champions
Taipei, Taiwan
