= 1976 Big League World Series =

Tournament details
- Country: United States
- City: Fort Lauderdale, Florida
- Dates: 14–21 August 1976
- Teams: 10

Final positions
- Champions: Taipei, Taiwan
- Runner-up: Broward County, Florida

The 1976 Big League World Series took place from August 14–21 in Fort Lauderdale, Florida, United States. Taipei, Taiwan defeated host Broward County, Florida in the championship game. It was Taiwan's third straight championship.

== Teams ==
United States	International
(Florida) Broward County, Florida Host	Windsor, Ontario Canada
(New York (state)) Rockland County, New York East	(West Germany) West Germany Europe
(Illinois) Chicago, Illinois North	(Taiwan) Taipei, Taiwan Far East
(Texas) San Antonio, Texas; District 20; South	Mexico Mexico
(California) Cupertino, California; Central Coast; West	Puerto Rico Puerto Rico

== Results ==
Upper round 1	Upper round 2	Upper round 3	Upper final	Final
1–0	Florida	7
—	Florida	4	—	(New York (state)) New York	4
2–0	Florida	0
—	Puerto Rico	3
1–0	Texas	2
—	Texas	1
—	West Germany	0
2–0	Texas	0
2–0	Taiwan	12
1–0	Illinois	5
—	Illinois	6	—	Mexico	0
2–0	Illinois	0
—	Canada	4
1–0	Taiwan	8
—	Taiwan	7
—	California	2	3–0	Taiwan	4	–
5–1	Florida	0	–
Lower round 1	Lower round 2	Lower round 3	Lower round 4	Lower final
2–1	Florida
0–1	Mexico	1	2–1	Puerto Rico	2–1	Texas	0
0–1	Puerto Rico	5	1–1	Puerto Rico	7	3–1	Florida	4	4–1	Florida	1
0–1	West Germany	1	3–1	California	0
2–1	Illinois
0–1	(New York (state)) New York	2–1	California
0–1	Canada	5	1–1	California
0–1	California	13

1976 Big League World Series Champions
Taipei, Taiwan
