= 1973 Big League World Series =

Tournament details
- Country: United States
- City: Fort Lauderdale, Florida
- Dates: 14–18 August 1973
- Teams: 8

Final positions
- Champions: Lincolnwood, Illinois
- Runners-up: Orange County, California

The 1973 Big League World Series took place from August 14–18 in Fort Lauderdale, Florida, United States. The tournament, held annually since 1968, saw Lincolnwood, Illinois, defeated Orange County, California, twice in the championship game.

== Teams ==
United States	International
(Florida) Broward County, Florida Host	Windsor, Ontario Canada
(Delaware) Dover, Delaware East	(West Germany) West Germany Europe
(Illinois) Lincolnwood, Illinois North	(Puerto Rico) Puerto Rico Latin America
(North Carolina) Winston-Salem, North Carolina South	
(California) Orange County, California; West Orange County; West

== Results ==
Upper round 1	Upper round 2	Upper final	Championship
—	Florida	2
—	California	9
1–0	California	12
1–0	Puerto Rico	7
—	Puerto Rico	5
—	Canada	4
2–0	California	7
2–0	Illinois	1
—	West Germany	1
—	North Carolina	3
1–0	North Carolina	0
1–0	Illinois	7
—	Delaware	3
—	Illinois	7	3–0	California	0	2
3–1	Illinois	8	6
Lower round 1	Lower round 2	Lower round 3	Lower final
1–1	Puerto Rico	6
0–1	Florida	7	1–1	Florida	9	2–1	Illinois	4
0–1	Canada	1	2–1	Florida	3–1	Delaware	0
2–1	Delaware
1–1	North Carolina	1
0–1	West Germany	0	1–1	Delaware (F/8)	2
0–1	Delaware	5

1973 Big League World Series Champions
Lincolnwood, Illinois

== See also ==
- 1973 in baseball
