= 1979 Big League World Series =

Tournament details
- Country: United States
- City: Fort Lauderdale, Florida
- Dates: 11–18 August 1979
- Teams: 11

Final positions
- Champions: (New York (state)) West Hempstead, New York
- Runners-up: Orlando, Florida

The 1979 Big League World Series took place from August 11–18 in Fort Lauderdale, Florida, United States. West Hempstead, New York defeated Orlando, Florida in the championship game.

== Teams ==
United States	International
(Florida) Broward County, Florida Host	Lethbridge, Alberta; Elks; Canada
(New York (state)) District 29 Nassau County, New York East	(West Germany) West Germany Europe
(Illinois) Chicago, Illinois North	(Taiwan) Taipei, Taiwan Far East
(Florida) Orlando, Florida South	Mexico Mexico
(Arizona) Tucson, Arizona West	Puerto Rico Puerto Rico
	Venezuela Venezuela

== Results ==
Upper round 1	Upper round 2	Upper round 3	Upper final	Final
1–0	Puerto Rico	4
—	West Germany	0	—	(New York (state)) New York	6
1–0	(New York (state)) New York
—	Puerto Rico	8
1–0	Illinois
—	Arizona	3
—	Illinois	20
2–0	(New York (state)) New York	5
2–0	Florida	4
1–0	Canada	0
—	Canada	1	—	(Florida) Host	17
1–0	(Florida) Host	4
—	Mexico	0
1–0	Florida	7
1–0	Taiwan	3
—	Taiwan	3	—	Florida (F/8)	4
3–0	(New York (state)) New York	5	–
—	Venezuela	0
3–1	Florida	1	–
Lower round 1	Lower round 2	Lower round 3	Lower round 4	Lower round 5	Lower final
1–1	Illinois	2
1–1	Canada	7	2–1	Canada	1	2–1	Florida
0–1	Venezuela	2–1	Puerto Rico	4	2–1	Illinois	1	4–1	Taiwan (Note: Taiwan was disqualified against Florida for using an ineligible pitcher. They were leading 2–1 in the final inning when the protest was filed.)
1–1	Puerto Rico	3–1	Taiwan	5
2–1	(Florida) Host	2
1–1	Taiwan	5	2–1	Taiwan (F/8)	3
0–1	Arizona	7	1–1	Arizona	1
0–1	Mexico	13	1–1	Mexico	3
0–1	West Germany	2

Notes

1979 Big League World Series Champions
West Hempstead, New York
