= 1984 Big League World Series =

Tournament details
- Country: United States
- City: Fort Lauderdale, Florida
- Dates: 11–18 August 1984
- Teams: 11

Final positions
- Champions: Taipei, Taiwan
- Runner-up: Maracaibo, Venezuela

The 1984 Big League World Series took place from August 11–18 in Fort Lauderdale, Florida, United States. Taipei, Taiwan defeated Maracaibo, Venezuela in the championship game. It was Taiwan's second straight championship

== Teams ==
United States	International
(Florida) Broward County, Florida Host	Surrey, British Columbia Canada
(Maryland) Salisbury, Maryland East	(West Germany) West Germany Europe
(Michigan) Grand Rapids, Michigan North	(Taiwan) Taipei, Taiwan Far East
(Florida) Orlando, Florida South	Mexico Mexico
(California) Sacramento, California West	Puerto Rico Puerto Rico
	Maracaibo, Venezuela Venezuela

== Results ==
Upper round 1	Upper round 2	Upper round 3	Upper final	Final
1–0	Florida	5
—	Florida	4	—	Maryland	1
2–0	Florida (F/13)	3
—	Puerto Rico	2
1–0	California	1
—	California	5
—	Mexico	4
3–0	Florida	0
3–0	Taiwan	5
1–0	Taiwan	17
—	Taiwan	10	—	West Germany	0
2–0	Taiwan	3
—	Venezuela	2
2–0	(Florida) Host	1
1–0	(Florida) Host (F/9)	9
—	(Florida) Host	11	—	Canada	8
4–0	Taiwan	6	–
—	Michigan	1
6–1	Venezuela	4	–
Lower round 1	Lower round 2	Lower round 3	Lower round 4	Lower round 5	Lower final
1–1	California	9
0–1	West Germany	1	2–1	Michigan	4	3–1	Florida	3
0–1	Michigan	8	1–1	Michigan	18	2–1	California	6	5–1	Venezuela	7
0–1	Puerto Rico	1	4–1	Venezuela (F/8)	7
2–1	(Florida) Host	2
0–1	Canada	6	3–1	Venezuela	3
0–1	Maryland	3	2–1	Venezuela	12
0–1	Venezuela	7	1–1	Venezuela	13
0–1	Mexico	0

1984 Big League World Series Champions
Taipei, Taiwan
