= 1969 Big League World Series =

Tournament details
- Country: United States
- City: Winston-Salem, North Carolina
- Dates: 12–16 August 1969
- Teams: 6

Final positions
- Champions: Barstow, California
- Runner-up: Winston-Salem, North Carolina

The 1969 Big League World Series took place from August 12–16 in Winston-Salem, North Carolina, United States. Barstow, California defeated host Winston-Salem in the championship game. This was the final BLWS held in Winston-Salem.

This year marked the first appearance of a Canadian team.

== Teams ==
United States	International
(North Carolina) Winston-Salem, North Carolina Host	Fort William, Ontario Canada
(New York (state)) New Hyde Park, New York East	
(Illinois) Lincolnwood, Illinois North
(Florida) Fort Lauderdale, Florida South
(California) Barstow, California; Mojave Desert; West

== Results ==
Upper round 1
—	California	4
—	Florida	0
—	Illinois
—	Canada
Lower round 1
0–1	Florida
0–1	Canada
1–1	Illinois
0–1	(New York (state)) New York

Upper round 2
—	North Carolina	2
—	(New York (state)) New York	1
1–0	California	1
1–0	Illinois	0
Lower round 2
1–1	Florida	0
2–1	Illinois (F/18)	1

Upper final
1–0	North Carolina	2
2–0	California	5
Lower final
1–1	North Carolina	3
3–1	Illinois	1

World Championship
3–0	California	12	—
2–1	North Carolina	6	—

1969 Big League World Series Champions
Mojave Desert LL
Barstow, California
