= 1980 Big League World Series =

Tournament details
- Country: United States
- City: Fort Lauderdale, Florida
- Dates: 16–23 August 1980
- Teams: 11

Final positions
- Champions: Buena Park, California
- Runner-up: Orlando, Florida

The 1980 Big League World Series took place from August 16–23 in Fort Lauderdale, Florida, United States. Buena Park, California defeated Orlando, Florida in the championship game.

== Teams ==
United States	International
(Florida) Broward County, Florida Host	Lethbridge, Alberta; Elks; Canada
(Rhode Island) Providence, Rhode Island East	(West Germany) West Germany Europe
(Illinois) Chicago, Illinois North	(Taiwan) Taipei, Taiwan Far East
(Florida) Orlando, Florida South	Mexico Mexico
(California) Buena Park, California West	Puerto Rico Puerto Rico
	Venezuela Venezuela

== Results ==
Upper round 1	Upper round 2	Upper round 3	Upper final	Final
1–0	California	12
—	California	16	—	Rhode Island	0
2–0	California	13
—	West Germany	1
1–0	(Florida) Host	1
—	(Florida) Host (F/9)	1
—	Florida	0
3–0	California	5
3–0	Taiwan	2
1–0	Puerto Rico	3
—	Puerto Rico	5	—	Venezuela	4
1–0	Venezuela	2
—	Canada	1
2–0	Taiwan	7
1–0	Taiwan	7
—	Taiwan	6	—	Mexico	0
4–0	California	3	–
—	Illinois	0
5–1	Florida	2	–
Lower round 1	Lower round 2	Lower round 3	Lower round 4	Lower round 5	Lower final
1–1	(Florida) Host	6
1–1	Puerto Rico	0	2–1	Illinois	2	3–1	Taiwan	1
0–1	Illinois	1–1	Illinois	1	2–1	(Florida) Host	1	4–1	Florida	5
0–1	Rhode Island	3–1	Florida	4
1–1	Venezuela	1
0–1	Mexico	1	2–1	Florida	2
0–1	Florida	8	1–1	Florida	7
0–1	West Germany	3	1–1	Canada	0
0–1	Canada	7

1980 Big League World Series Champions
Buena Park, California
