= 1982 Big League World Series =

Tournament details
- Country: United States
- City: Fort Lauderdale, Florida
- Dates: 14–21 August 1982
- Teams: 11

Final positions
- Champions: Puerto Rico
- Runners-up: Venezuela

The 1982 Big League World Series took place from August 14–21 in Fort Lauderdale, Florida, United States. Puerto Rico defeated Venezuela in the championship game.

== Teams ==
United States	International
(Florida) Broward County, Florida Host	Quebec Canada
(New York (state)) Dutchess County, New York; Southern Dutchess; East	(West Germany) West Germany Europe
(Michigan) Grand Rapids, Michigan North	(Taiwan) Taipei, Taiwan Far East
(Florida) Tampa, Florida South	Mexico Mexico
(Arizona) Tucson, Arizona West	Puerto Rico Puerto Rico
	Venezuela Venezuela

== Results ==
Upper round 1	Upper round 2	Upper round 3	Upper final	Final
1–0	Venezuela	11
—	Venezuela	10	—	Canada	0
2–0	Venezuela	3
—	West Germany	1
1–0	Arizona	0
—	Arizona	10
—	(New York (state)) New York	0
3–0	Venezuela	0
3–0	Puerto Rico (F/13)	1
1–0	Florida	6
—	Florida	6	—	Mexico	1
2–0	Florida	7
—	Michigan	5
2–0	Puerto Rico	11
1–0	Puerto Rico	4
—	(Florida) Host	3	—	Taiwan	1
4–0	Puerto Rico	2	–
—	Puerto Rico (F/8)	4
4–1	Venezuela	0	–
Lower round 1	Lower round 2	Lower round 3	Lower round 4	Lower round 5	Lower final
1–1	Arizona (F/8)	2
0–1	Mexico	9	1–1	Mexico	1	3–1	Venezuela	4
0–1	(Florida) Host	1	1–1	Canada	2	2–1	Arizona	5	3–1	Arizona	1
0–1	Canada	3	3–1	Florida	3
2–1	Florida	5
0–1	Taiwan	1	2–1	(New York (state)) New York	3
0–1	(New York (state)) New York	2	1–1	(New York (state)) New York	3
0–1	Michigan	5	1–1	Michigan	1
0–1	West Germany	0

1982 Big League World Series Champions
Puerto Rico
