= 1995 Big League World Series =

Tournament details
- Country: United States
- City: Fort Lauderdale, Florida
- Dates: 11–19 August 1995
- Teams: 11

Final positions
- Champions: Tainan, Taiwan
- Runner-up: Broward County, Florida

The 1995 Big League World Series took place from August 11–19 in Fort Lauderdale, Florida, United States. For the third consecutive year, Tainan, Taiwan defeated Broward County, Florida in the championship game. It was Taiwan's third straight title.

After reverting to the 11 team single bracket format in 1994; the two bracket system for US and International teams returned.

== Teams ==
United States	International
(Florida) Broward County, Florida; District 10; Host	Surrey, British Columbia, Canada Canada
(Delaware) Dover, Delaware East	Zapopan, Mexico (Note: Zapopan finished third in the Central America regional tournament. They received the World Series berth after the top two teams were disqualified for fighting.) Central America
(Illinois) Burbank, Illinois North	(Germany) Spangdalhlem, Germany Europe
(Georgia (U.S. state)) Macon, Georgia South	(Taiwan) Tainan, Taiwan Far East
(Hawaii) Aiea, Hawaii West	Puerto Rico Puerto Rico
	Maracaibo, Venezuela Venezuela

== Results ==
United States Bracket

First Round
—	Florida	3
—	Illinois	2
Lower round 1
0–1	Illinois	17
0–1	Delaware	9

Second Round
1–0	Florida	10
—	(Georgia (U.S. state)) Georgia	5
—	Hawaii	11
—	Delaware	10
Lower round 2
0–1	(Georgia (U.S. state)) Georgia	9
1–1	Illinois	8

Semifinals
2–0	Florida	10
1–0	Hawaii	0
Lower final
1–1	Hawaii	4
1–1	(Georgia (U.S. state)) Georgia	0

United States Championship
3–0	Florida	1
2–1	Hawaii	7

International Bracket

Upper round 1	Upper round 2	Upper final	International Championship
1–0	Taiwan	3
—	Taiwan	21	—	Mexico	2
—	Germany	1	2–0	Taiwan	3
1–0	Venezuela	2
1–0	Puerto Rico	2
—	Puerto Rico	5	—	Venezuela	14
—	Canada	2
3–0	Taiwan	2	3
2–1	Venezuela	7	0
Lower round 1	Lower round 2	Lower round 3	Lower final
1–1	Venezuela	6
1–1	Puerto Rico	4	3–1	Canada	4
0–1	Mexico	5	2–1	Canada	6
0–1	Germany	1	1–1	Canada	10
0–1	Canada	14

Elimination Round

Semifinals
3–0	Florida	1 · 15
2–1	Hawaii	7 · 5
3–0	Taiwan	2 · 3
2–1	Venezuela	7 · 0

World Championship
4–1	Florida	1
4–1	Taiwan	6

1995 Big League World Series Champions
Tainan, Taiwan
