= 1992 Big League World Series =

Tournament details
- Country: United States
- City: Fort Lauderdale, Florida
- Dates: 14–22 August 1992
- Teams: 11

Final positions
- Champions: Broward County, Florida
- Runner-up: Maracaibo, Venezuela

The 1992 Big League World Series took place from August 14–22 in Fort Lauderdale, Florida, United States. Host Broward County, Florida defeated Maracaibo, Venezuela twice in the championship game.

== Teams ==
United States	International
(Florida) Broward County, Florida; District 10; Host	Canada Canada
(Delaware) Dover, Delaware East	Mexico Central America
(Michigan) Grand Rapids, Michigan North	(Russia) Moscow, Russia Europe
(Virginia) Bristol, Virginia South	(Taiwan) Taipei, Taiwan Far East
(California) High Desert, California West	Puerto Rico Puerto Rico
	Maracaibo, Venezuela Venezuela

== Results ==
Upper round 1	Upper round 2	Upper round 3	Upper final	Final
1–0	Florida	6
—	Florida	10	—	Michigan	2
2–0	Florida	1
—	Virginia	0
1–0	Taiwan	6
—	Taiwan	15
—	Puerto Rico	0
2–0	Taiwan	2
3–0	Venezuela (F/14)	3
1–0	California	3
—	California (F/8)	3	—	Delaware	1
2–0	California	3
—	Mexico	2
2–0	Venezuela (F/15)	4
1–0	Venezuela	14
—	Venezuela (F/12)	4	—	Russia	3
—	Canada	3	4–0	Venezuela	2	4
5–1	Florida	5	5
Lower round 1	Lower round 2	Lower round 3	Lower round 4	Lower final
0–1	Puerto Rico	3
2–1	California	0
0–1	Virginia (F/13)	4
1–1	Virginia	3	2–1	Delaware	2
2–1	Taiwan	0
1–1	Delaware	9
0–1	Michigan	1	3–1	Delaware	8	4–1	Florida	1
0–1	Delaware	5	3–1	Florida	9
2–1	Florida	6
0–1	Russia	3	2–1	Canada	4
0–1	Canada	11	1–1	Canada	9
0–1	Mexico	1

1992 Big League World Series Champions
District 10
Broward County, Florida
