= 1993 Big League World Series =

Tournament details
- Country: United States
- City: Fort Lauderdale, Florida
- Dates: 13–21 August 1993
- Teams: 11

Final positions
- Champions: Taipei, Taiwan
- Runner-up: Broward County, Florida

The 1993 Big League World Series took place from August 13–21 in Fort Lauderdale, Florida, United States. Taipei, Taiwan defeated host Broward County, Florida in the championship game.

A new format was introduced this year. The 11 team double-elimination format was replaced with two (International, and United States) double-elimination brackets, culminating with a winner-take-all championship game.

== Teams ==
United States	International
(Florida) Broward County, Florida; District 10 National; Host	Canada Canada
(Delaware) Sussex County, Delaware East	Mexico Central America
(Michigan) Grand Rapids, Michigan North	(Germany) Ramstein, Germany Europe
(Florida) Broward County, Florida; District 10 American; South	(Taiwan) Taipei, Taiwan Far East
(Hawaii) Pearl City, Hawaii West	Guayama, Puerto Rico Puerto Rico
	Maracaibo, Venezuela Venezuela

== Results ==
United States Bracket

First Round
—	(Florida) Host	7
—	Michigan	1
Lower round 1
0–1	Michigan	14
0–1	Florida	7

Second Round
1–0	(Florida) Host	0
—	Delaware	6
—	Hawaii	3
—	Florida	2
Lower round 2
1–1	(Florida) Host	7
1–1	Michigan	2

Semifinals
1–0	Delaware	0
1–0	Hawaii	4
Lower final
1–1	Delaware	1
2–1	(Florida) Host	7

United States Championship
2–0	Hawaii	4
3–1	(Florida) Host	6

International Bracket

Upper round 1	Upper round 2	Upper final	International Championship
1–0	Taiwan	31
—	Taiwan	10	—	Germany	2
—	Canada	3	2–0	Taiwan	7
1–0	Puerto Rico	0
1–0	Mexico	1
—	Mexico	4	—	Puerto Rico	7
—	Venezuela	3
3–0	Taiwan	8	—
4–1	Venezuela	2	—
Lower round 1	Lower round 2	Lower round 3	Lower final
1–1	Puerto Rico	3
0–1	Germany	1	3–1	Venezuela	5
1–1	Mexico	5	2–1	Venezuela	10
0–1	Canada	4	1–1	Venezuela	13
0–1	Venezuela	23

Elimination Round

Semifinals
2–0	Hawaii	4 · 3
3–1	(Florida) Host	6 · 4
3–0	Taiwan	8
4–1	Venezuela	2

World Championship
5–1	(Florida) Host	0
4–0	Taiwan	7

1993 Big League World Series Champions
Taipei, Taiwan
