= 2009 Big League World Series =

Tournament details
- Country: United States
- City: Easley, South Carolina
- Dates: 29 July – 5 August 2009
- Teams: 11

Final positions
- Champions: Santiago, Dominican Republic
- Runner-up: Thousand Oaks, California

The 2009 Big League World Series took place from July 29-August 5 in Easley, South Carolina, United States. Santiago, Dominican Republic defeated Thousand Oaks, California in the championship game.

== Teams ==
United States	International
(South Carolina) Easley, South Carolina; District 1 Host	(Guam) Yona, Guam; District 1 Asia–Pacific
(Illinois) Burbank, Illinois; District 15; Central	(Nova Scotia) Cape Breton, Nova Scotia; District 1 Canada
(Pennsylvania) Williamsport, Pennsylvania; District 12; East	(Germany) Ramstein, Germany; District 2 EMEA
(Florida) Vero Beach, Florida; District 17; Southeast	(Dominican Republic) Santiago, Dominican Republic; Los Bravos de Pontezuela; Latin America
(Louisiana) Ruston. Louisiana; District 5 Southwest	Mexicali, Mexico; District 14; Mexico
(California) Thousand Oaks, California; District 13; West	

== Results ==
United States Group

Team	W	L	Rs	Ra
Louisiana	4	0	31	10
California	3	1	15	14
South Carolina	2	2	27	20
Pennsylvania	2	2	14	16
Illinois	1	3	13	21
Florida	0	4	4	22

	(California)	(Florida)	(Illinois)	(Louisiana)	(Pennsylvania)	(South Carolina)
California	–	2–0	4–1	4–10	–	5–3
Florida	0–2	–	4–5	–	0–2	0–13
Illinois	1–4	5–4	–	1–5	6–8	–
Louisiana	10–4	–	5–1	–	3–2	13–3
Pennsylvania	–	2–0	8–6	2–3	–	2–8
South Carolina	3–5	13–0	–	3–13	8–2	–

International Group

Team	W	L	Rs	Ra
Dominican Republic	4	0	42	8
Mexico	3	1	24	19
Guam	2	2	17	14
Canada	1	3	14	33
Germany	0	4	11	34

	(Canada)	(Dominican Republic)	(Germany)	(Guam)	(Mexico)
Canada	–	4–14	7–4	3–10	0–5
Dominican Republic	14–4	–	8–2	6–0	14–2
Germany	4–7	2–8	–	2–5	3–14
Guam	10–3	0–6	5–2	–	2–3
Mexico	5–0	2–14	14–3	3–2	–

Elimination Round

Semifinals
4–0	Louisiana	2
3–1	California	5
4–0	Dominican Republic	6
3–1	Mexico	4

World Championship
4–1	California	0
5–0	Dominican Republic	12

2009 Big League World Series Champions
Los Bravos de Pontezuela
Santiago, Dominican Republic
