= Big League World Series (Asia–Pacific Region) =

Asia–Pacific Region
- Most recent season or competition: 2016 Big League World Series
- Sport: Baseball
- Founded: 1974; 52 years ago
- Folded: 2016; 10 years ago
- Last champions: Taoyuan, Taiwan
- Most titles: Taiwan (27)

The Big League World Series (BLWS) Asia–Pacific Region (formerly the Far East Region) was one of five International regions that sent teams to the World Series . The Big League division was discontinued by Little League Baseball after the 2016 BLWS. The region's participation in the BLWS had dated back to 1968. It produced the most championships (18) of any region, all won by Taiwan.

== Asia–Pacific Region Countries ==
- China
- Guam
- Indonesia
- Northern Mariana Islands
- Philippines
- Taiwan

== Region Champions ==
Year	City	BLWS	Record
1974	Taipei, Taiwan	Champions	4–0
1975	Taipei, Taiwan	Champions	4–0
1976	Taipei, Taiwan	Champions	4–0
1977	Taipei, Taiwan	Champions	6–1
1978	Taipei, Taiwan	Champions	5–0
1979	Taipei, Taiwan	Third Place	4–2
1980	Taipei, Taiwan	Third Place	3–2
1981	Taipei, Taiwan	Champions	5–0
1982	Taipei, Taiwan	Round 3	0–2
1983	Taipei, Taiwan	Champions	5–0
1984	Taipei, Taiwan	Champions	5–0
1985	Taipei, Taiwan	Round 3	1–2
1986	Taipei, Taiwan	Fourth Place	4–2
1987	Taipei, Taiwan	Champions	5–1
1988	Taipei, Taiwan	Champions	6–1
1989	Taipei, Taiwan	Champions	5–0
1990	Taipei, Taiwan	Champions	5–0
1991	Taipei, Taiwan	Champions	5–0
1992	Taipei, Taiwan	Third Place	2–2
1993	Taipei, Taiwan	Champions	5–0
1994	Taipei, Taiwan	Champions	8–1
1995	Tainan, Taiwan	Champions	5–1
1996	Kaohsiung, Taiwan	Champions	4–0
1997	Saipan, Northern Mariana Islands	Round 1	0–2
1998	Saipan, Northern Mariana Islands	Round 2	1–2
1999	Saipan, Northern Mariana Islands	Pool stage	1–2
2000	Hagåtña, Guam	Int'l Final	2–2
2001	Saipan, Northern Mariana Islands	Pool stage	0–4
2002	Makati, Philippines	Pool stage	0–4
2003	Yona, Guam	Pool stage	0–4
2004	Yona, Guam	Pool stage	0–4
2005	Yona, Guam	Pool stage	1–3
2006	Yona, Guam	Pool stage	1–4
2007	Saipan, Northern Mariana Islands	Pool stage	2–2
2008	Saipan, Northern Mariana Islands	Pool stage	0–4
2009	Yona, Guam	Pool stage	2–2
2010	Makati, Philippines	Pool stage	2–2
2011	Makati, Philippines	Pool stage	0–4
2012	Muntinlupa, Philippines	Pool stage	2–2
2013	Taoyuan, Taiwan	Int'l Final	4–1
2014	Taoyuan, Taiwan	Pool stage	2–2
2015	Taichung, Taiwan	Int'l Final	3–1
2016	Taoyuan, Taiwan	Champions	4–0

=== Results by Country ===
Country	Region Championships	BLWS Championships	W–L	PCT
Taiwan	27	18	113–21	.843
Guam	6	0	6–19	.240
Northern Mariana Islands	6	0	4–16	.200
Philippines	4	0	4–12	.250
Total	43	18	127–68	.651

== See also ==
Asia–Pacific Region in other Little League divisions

- Little League — Far East
  - Asia–Pacific & Middle East
  - Japan
- Intermediate League
- Junior League
- Senior League
