= 2015 Big League World Series =

Tournament details
- Country: United States
- City: Easley, South Carolina
- Dates: 28 July – 4 August 2015
- Teams: 11

Final positions
- Champions: Guayama, Puerto Rico
- Runner-up: Thousand Oaks, California

The 2015 Big League World Series took place from July 28 - August 4 in Easley, South Carolina, United States. Guayama, Puerto Rico defeated Thousand Oaks, California in the championship game.

A modified double-elimination format was introduced this year.

== Teams ==
United States	International
(South Carolina) Easley, South Carolina; District 1 Host	(Taiwan) Taichung City, Taiwan; Taichung City; Asia–Pacific
(Michigan) Grand Rapids, Michigan; District 9 Central	(Alberta) Calgary, Alberta; District 8 Canada
(Delaware) Dover, Delaware; District; East	(Netherlands) Rotterdam, Netherlands; District 1 Europe–Africa
(Florida) Dunedin, Florida; District 12; Southeast	(Puerto Rico) Guayama, Puerto Rico; District 13; Latin America
(Texas) Garland, Texas; South Garland; Southwest	San Nicolás, Mexico; Las Puentes; Mexico
(California) Thousand Oaks, California; District 13; West	

== Results ==
United States Bracket

First Round
—	Michigan	2
—	Delaware	4
—	South Carolina	2
—	California (F/8)	4
Lower round 1
0–1	Michigan	5
0–1	Florida	3
0–1	Texas	0
0–1	South Carolina	11

Second Round
—	Texas	0
1–0	Delaware	5
—	Florida	3
1–0	California	4
Lower round 2
1–1	Michigan	1
1–1	South Carolina	2

Semifinals
2–0	Delaware	1
2–0	California	2
Lower final
2–1	Delaware	7
2–1	South Carolina	8

United States Championship
3–0	California	7
3–1	South Carolina	4

International Bracket

First Round
—	Canada	0
—	Taiwan	17
Lower round 1
0–1	Canada	2
0–1	Puerto Rico	11

Second Round
—	Netherlands	2
1–0	Taiwan	5
—	Puerto Rico	3
—	Mexico	4
Lower round 2
1–1	Puerto Rico	10
0–1	Netherlands	0

Semifinals
2–0	Taiwan	12
1–0	Mexico	2
Lower final
1–1	Mexico	0
2–1	Puerto Rico	1

International Championship
3–0	Taiwan	2
3–1	Puerto Rico	3

Consolation round

—
0–2	Florida	16
0–2	Canada	8

—
0–2	Texas	3
0–2	Netherlands	10

Elimination Round

Semifinals
3–0	California	7
3–1	South Carolina	4
3–0	Taiwan	2
3–1	Puerto Rico	3

World Championship
4–0	California	1
4–1	Puerto Rico	3

2015 Big League World Series Champions
District 13
Guayama, Puerto Rico
