= Big League World Series (Host Team) =

The Big League World Series (BLWS) Host team was one of six United States "regions" that sent teams to the World Series. The Big League division was discontinued by Little League Baseball after the 2016 BLWS.

== Host Teams at the Big League World Series ==
Year	City	BLWS	Record
1968	Winston-Salem, North Carolina	Third Place	1–2
1969	Winston-Salem, North Carolina	Runner-up	2–2
1970	Broward County, Florida	Round 2	1–2
1971	Broward County, Florida	Fourth Place	2–2
1972	Broward County, Florida	Round 2	1–2
1973	Broward County, Florida	Fourth Place	2–2
1974	Broward County, Florida	Round 3	1–2
1975	Broward County, Florida	Third Place	2–2
1976	Broward County, Florida	Runner-up	5–2
1977	Broward County, Florida	Runner-up	3–2
1978	Broward County, Florida	Fourth Place	4–2
1979	Broward County, Florida	Round 4	1–2
1980	Broward County, Florida	Fourth Place	2–2
1981	Broward County, Florida	Fourth Place	3–2
1982	Broward County, Florida	Round 2	0–2
1983	Broward County, Florida	Runner-up	3–2
1984	Broward County, Florida	Round 4	2–2
1985	Broward County, Florida	Champions	5–1
1986	Broward County, Florida	Runner-up	3–2
1987	Broward County, Florida	Runner-up	5–2
1988	Broward County, Florida	Runner-up	4–2
1989	Broward County, Florida	Fourth Place	3–2
1990	Broward County, Florida	Third Place	3–2
1991	Broward County, Florida	Third Place	4–2
1992	Broward County, Florida	Champions	7–1
1993	Broward County, Florida	Runner-up	5–2
1994	Broward County, Florida	Runner-up	4–2
1995	Broward County, Florida	Runner-up	4–2
1996	Broward County, Florida	Round 3	2–2
1997	Broward County, Florida	Champions	5–0
1998	Broward County, Florida	Round 2	1–2
1999	Tucson, Arizona	Pool stage	1–3
2000	Tucson, Arizona	Pool stage	2–2
2001	Easley, South Carolina	Fourth Place	3–3
2002	Easley, South Carolina	Semifinals	3–2
2003	Easley, South Carolina	Champions	6–0
2004	Easley, South Carolina	Champions	6–0
2005	Easley, South Carolina	Champions	5–1
2006	Easley, South Carolina	Semifinals	4–1
2007	Easley, South Carolina	Champions	5–1
2008	Easley, South Carolina	Pool stage	3–1
2009	Easley, South Carolina	Pool stage	2–2
2010	Easley, South Carolina	Pool stage	1–3
2011	Easley, South Carolina	US Final	4–1
2012	Easley, South Carolina	Runner-up	4–2
2013	Easley, South Carolina	Pool stage	2–2
2014	Easley, South Carolina	US Final	3–2
2015	Easley, South Carolina	US Final	3–2
2016	Easley, South Carolina	Round 2	2–2

== Results by Host ==
City	BLWS Hosted	BLWS Championships	BLWS Record	PCT
Broward County, Florida	29	3	87–54	.617
Easley, South Carolina	16	4	56–25	.691
Winston-Salem, North Carolina	2	0	3–4	.429
Tucson, Arizona	2	0	3–5	.375
Total	49	7	149–88	.629

== See also ==
Host Teams in other Little League divisions

- Intermediate League
- Junior League
- Senior League
