= 1977 Big League World Series =

Tournament details
- Country: United States
- City: Fort Lauderdale, Florida
- Dates: 13–20 August 1977
- Teams: 10

Final positions
- Champions: Taipei, Taiwan
- Runner-up: Broward County, Florida

The 1977 Big League World Series took place from August 13–20 in Fort Lauderdale, Florida, United States. Taipei, Taiwan defeated host Broward County, Florida twice in the championship game. It was Taiwan's fourth straight championship.

== Teams ==
United States	International
(Florida) Broward County, Florida Host	Calgary, Alberta Canada
(New York (state)) West Hempstead, New York East	(West Germany) West Germany Europe
(Illinois) Chicago, Illinois North	(Taiwan) Taipei, Taiwan Far East
(Florida) Fernandina Beach, Florida South	Monterrey, Mexico Mexico
(Hawaii) Hilo, Hawaii West	Puerto Rico Puerto Rico

== Results ==
Upper round 1	Upper round 2	Upper round 3	Upper final	Final
1–0	Florida	9
—	Florida	7	—	Puerto Rico	4
2–0	Florida	0
—	Canada	3
1–0	Hawaii	3
—	Hawaii	3
—	Mexico	1
2–0	Hawaii	5
2–0	(Florida) Host	8
1–0	Illinois	1
—	Illinois	4	—	(Florida) Host	5
1–0	(Florida) Host	3
—	West Germany	0
1–0	Taiwan	1
—	Taiwan	2
—	(New York (state)) New York	1	3–0	(Florida) Host	1	0
4–1	Taiwan	4	4
Lower round 1	Lower round 2	Lower round 3	Lower round 4	Lower final
2–1	Florida	4
1–1	Illinois	2–1	Illinois	1
0–1	Canada	2	1–1	Canada	3–1	Florida	0
0–1	Mexico	1	3–1	Taiwan	7
2–1	Hawaii	2
1–1	Taiwan	7	2–1	Taiwan	3
0–1	Puerto Rico	2	2–1	(New York (state)) New York	0
0–1	West Germany	0	1–1	(New York (state)) New York	8
0–1	(New York (state)) New York	5

1977 Big League World Series Champions
Taipei, Taiwan
