= 1968 Big League World Series =

Tournament details
- Country: United States
- City: Winston-Salem, North Carolina
- Dates: 7–10 August 1968
- Teams: 5

Final positions
- Champions: Charleston, West Virginia
- Runner-up: (New York (state)) New Hyde Park, New York

The 1968 Big League World Series took place from August 7–10 in Winston-Salem, North Carolina, United States. Charleston, West Virginia defeated New Hyde Park, New York in the championship game.

This was the inaugural BLWS.

== Teams ==
United States
(North Carolina) Winston-Salem, North Carolina
Southwest Forsyth
Host
(New York (state)) New Hyde Park, New York

East
(Indiana) Indianapolis, Indiana

North
(West Virginia) Charleston, West Virginia

South
(California) Barstow–Victorville, California

West

== Results ==
Upper round 1
—	West Virginia (F/8)	5
—	California	2
Lower round 1
0–1	California
0–1	Indiana

Upper round 2
1–0	West Virginia	3
—	(New York (state)) New York	2
—	North Carolina	7
—	Indiana	3
Lower round 2
0–1	(New York (state)) New York	9
1–1	California	5

Upper final
2–0	West Virginia	3
1–0	North Carolina	1
Lower final
1–1	North Carolina
1–1	(New York (state)) New York

Championship
3–0	West Virginia (F/9)	3
2–1	(New York (state)) New York	2

1968 Big League World Series Champions
Charleston, West Virginia
