= 1994 Big League World Series =

Tournament details
- Country: United States
- City: Fort Lauderdale, Florida
- Dates: 12–20 August 1994
- Teams: 11

Final positions
- Champions: Taipei, Taiwan
- Runner-up: Broward County, Florida

The 1994 Big League World Series took place from August 12–20 in Fort Lauderdale, Florida, United States. In a championship rematch, Taipei, Taiwan defeated host Broward County, Florida twice in the championship game. It was Taiwan's second straight championship.

After using a two bracket system for US and International teams in 1993, the traditional 11 team bracket returned.

== Teams ==
United States	International
(Florida) Broward County, Florida; District 10; Host	Surrey, British Columbia Canada
(Maryland) Salisbury, Maryland; District 8 East	Mexico Central America
(Indiana) Indianapolis, Indiana North	(Germany) Ramstein, Germany Europe
(Texas) Victoria, Texas South	(Taiwan) Taipei, Taiwan Far East
(California) Victorville, California; District 49; West	Puerto Rico Puerto Rico
	Maracaibo, Venezuela Venezuela

== Results ==
Upper round 1	Upper round 2	Upper round 3	Upper final	Final
1–0	Florida	16
—	Florida	4	—	Germany	0
2–0	Florida	5
—	Puerto Rico	0
1–0	Venezuela	2
–	Venezuela	6
—	Maryland	0
3–0	Florida	5
2–0	California	2
1–0	Texas	3
—	Texas	3	—	Mexico	4
1–0	Mexico	2
—	Indiana	2
1–0	California	4
1–0	Taiwan	3
—	Taiwan (F/11)	7	—	California	7
—	Canada	3	4–0	Florida	2	4
6–1	Taiwan	3	11
Lower round 1	Lower round 2	Lower round 3	Lower round 4	Lower final
0–1	Puerto Rico	3
1–1	Mexico	7
0–1	Maryland	1
1–1	Puerto Rico	6	2–1	Canada	6
2–1	California	4
1–1	Canada	7
0–1	Germany	2	2–1	Mexico	0	5–1	Taiwan	7
0–1	Canada	15	4–1	Taiwan	8
1–1	Venezuela	2
1–1	Texas	3	3–1	Taiwan	3
1–1	Taiwan	9	2–1	Taiwan	8
0–1	Indiana	1

1994 Big League World Series Champions
Taipei, Taiwan
