= 1997 Big League World Series =

Tournament details
- Country: United States
- City: Fort Lauderdale, Florida
- Dates: 8–16 August 1997
- Teams: 11

Final positions
- Champions: Broward County, Florida
- Runners-up: Maracaibo, Venezuela

The 1997 Big League World Series took place from August 8–16 in Broward County, Florida, United States. Host Broward County, Florida defeated Maracaibo, Venezuela in the championship game.

== Teams ==
United States	International
(Florida) Broward County, Florida; District 10; Host	Ontario, Canada; District 2 Canada
(Pennsylvania) Williamsport, Pennsylvania; District 12; East	Guadalajara, Mexico Central America
(Illinois) Burbank, Illinois; District 15; North	(Lithuania) Utena, Lithuania; Utena East; Europe
(Florida) Melbourne, Florida; District 2 South	(Northern Mariana Islands) Saipan, Northern Mariana Islands; Saipan; Far East
(Hawaii) Aiea, Hawaii; District 6 West	Río Piedras, Puerto Rico; Vista Hermosa; Puerto Rico
	Maracaibo, Venezuela Venezuela

== Results ==
United States Bracket

First Round
—	(Florida) Host	3
—	Florida	2
Lower round 1
0–1	Florida	4
0–1	Illinois	1

Second Round
1–0	(Florida) Host	12
—	Pennsylvania	2
—	Hawaii	5
—	Illinois	4
Lower round 2
0–1	Pennsylvania	1
1–1	Florida	11

Semifinals
2–0	(Florida) Host	14
1–0	Hawaii	4
Lower final
1–1	Hawaii	6
2–1	Florida	8

United States Championship
3–0	(Florida) Host	7	—
3–1	Florida	0	—

International Bracket

Upper round 1	Upper round 2	Upper final	International Championship
1–0	Venezuela	7
—	Puerto Rico	2	—	Lithuania	2
—	Venezuela	8	2–0	Venezuela	3
2–0	Canada	0
1–0	Canada	2
—	Canada	10	—	Mexico	1
—	Northern Mariana Islands	5
3–0	Venezuela	7	26
4–1	Puerto Rico	10	0
Lower round 1	Lower round 2	Lower round 3	Lower final
2–1	Canada	2
0–1	Mexico	0	3–1	Puerto Rico	3
0–1	Lithuania	0	2–1	Puerto Rico	2
0–1	Northern Mariana Islands	5	1–1	Puerto Rico	10
0–1	Puerto Rico	17

Elimination round

Semifinals
3–0	(Florida) Host	7
3–1	Florida	0
3–0	Venezuela	7 · 26
4–1	Puerto Rico	10 · 0

World Championship
4–0	(Florida) Host	15
4–1	Venezuela	3

1997 Big League World Series Champions
District 10
Broward County, Florida
