= 1989 Big League World Series =

Tournament details
- Country: United States
- City: Fort Lauderdale, Florida
- Dates: 12–19 August 1989
- Teams: 11

Final positions
- Champions: Taipei, Taiwan
- Runner-up: Maracaibo, Venezuela

The 1989 Big League World Series took place from August 12–19 in Fort Lauderdale, Florida, United States. Taipei, Taiwan defeated Maracaibo, Venezuela in the championship game. It was Taiwan's third straight championship.

This year featured the debut of the Central America region.

== Teams ==
| United States | International |
|---|---|
| (Florida) Broward County, Florida; District 10; Host | Surrey, British Columbia, Canada Canada |
| (Delaware) Dover, Delaware East | Panama City, Panama Central America |
| (Illinois) Chicago, Illinois North | (West Germany) Ramstein, West Germany Europe |
| (Florida) Orlando, Florida South | (Taiwan) Taipei, Taiwan Far East |
| (California) San Leandro, California West | Carolina, Puerto Rico Puerto Rico |
| | Maracaibo, Venezuela Venezuela |

== Results ==
Upper round 1 | Upper round 2 | Upper round 3 | Upper final | Final
1–0 | Taiwan | 7
— | Taiwan | 5 | — | Canada | 0
2–0 | Taiwan | 8
— | (Florida) Host | 1
1–0 | Puerto Rico | 0
— | Puerto Rico | 6
— | Illinois | 5
3–0 | Taiwan | 4
3–0 | Panama | 1
1–0 | Venezuela | 7
— | Venezuela | 4 | — | Delaware | 1
2–0 | Venezuela | 0
— | Florida | 1
2–0 | Panama | 2
1–0 | Panama | 9
— | Panama | 6 | — | West Germany | 3
— | California | 3 | 4–0 | Taiwan | 1 | –
5–1 | Venezuela | 0 | –
Lower round 1 | Lower round 2 | Lower round 3 | Lower round 4 | Lower final
0–1 | Florida | 3
2–1 | Venezuela
0–1 | Illinois | 5
1–1 | Illinois | 8 | 2–1 | Illinois
3–1 | Panama | 6
1–1 | Canada | 2
0–1 | California | 1 | 3–1 | Venezuela | 3 | 4–1 | Venezuela | 7
0–1 | Canada | 6 | 3–1 | (Florida) Host | 1
1–1 | Puerto Rico | 6
0–1 | Delaware | 2 | 2–1 | (Florida) Host | 12
0–1 | West Germany | 1 | 1–1 | (Florida) Host | 12
0–1 | (Florida) Host | 11

1989 Big League World Series Champions
Taipei, Taiwan
