= 2007 Big League World Series =

Tournament details
- Country: United States
- City: Easley, South Carolina
- Dates: 28 July – 4 August 2007
- Teams: 11

Final positions
- Champions: Easley, South Carolina
- Runners-up: San Juan, Puerto Rico

The 2007 Big League World Series took place from July 28 - August 4 in Easley, South Carolina, United States. Easley, South Carolina defeated San Juan, Puerto Rico in the championship game.

== Teams ==
United States	International
(South Carolina) Easley, South Carolina; District 1 Host	(Northern Mariana Islands) Saipan, Northern Mariana Islands; Saipan; Asia–Pacific
(Michigan) Grand Rapids, Michigan; District 9 Central	(British Columbia) Fraser Valley, British Columbia; District 3 Canada
(Maryland) Hughesville, Maryland; District 7 East	(Georgia (country)) Tbilisi, Georgia; Tbilisi YMCA; EMEA
(South Carolina) Taylors, South Carolina; District 7 South	(Puerto Rico) San Juan, Puerto Rico; District 1 Latin America
(Louisiana) Ruston, Louisiana; District 5 Southwest	Monterrey, Mexico; Country de Monterrey; Mexico
(California) Thousand Oaks, California; District 13; West	

== Results ==
United States Group

Team	W	L	Rs	Ra
California	4	0	50	14
(South Carolina) Host	3	1	37	17
South Carolina	2	2	25	26
Michigan	2	2	15	28
Louisiana	1	3	23	44
Maryland	0	4	13	41

	(California)	(Louisiana)	(Maryland)	(Michigan)	(South Carolina)	(South Carolina)
California	–	23–5	14–2	8–3	5–4	–
Louisiana	5–23	–	–	4–6	2–4	12–11
Maryland	2–14	–	–	2–4	9–14	0–9
Michigan	3–8	6–4	4–2	–	–	2–12
South Carolina	4–5	4–2	14–9	–	–	3–5
Host (South Carolina)	–	11–12	9–0	12–2	5–3	–

International Group

Team	W	L	Rs	Ra
Mexico	4	0	40	14
Puerto Rico	3	1	48	14
Northern Mariana Islands	2	2	40	42
Canada	1	3	21	30
(Georgia (country)) Georgia	0	4	11	50

	(Canada)	(Georgia (country))	(Mexico)	(Northern Mariana Islands)	(Puerto Rico)
Canada	–	7–0	4–5	7–12	3–13
Georgia (Georgia (country))	0–7	–	0–17	9–12	2–14
Mexico	5–4	17–0	–	11–4	7–6
Northern Mariana Islands	12–7	12–9	4–11	–	2–15
Puerto Rico	13–3	14–2	6–7	15–2	–

Elimination Round

Semifinals
4–0	California	0
3–1	(South Carolina) Host	10
4–0	Mexico	1
3–1	Puerto Rico	6

World Championship
4–1	(South Carolina) Host	11
4–1	Puerto Rico	3

2007 Big League World Series Champions
District 1
Easley, South Carolina
