= 1990 Big League World Series =

Tournament details
- Country: United States
- City: Fort Lauderdale, Florida
- Dates: 10–18 August 1990
- Teams: 11

Final positions
- Champions: Taipei, Taiwan
- Runner-up: Maracaibo, Venezuela

The 1990 Big League World Series took place from August 10–18 in Fort Lauderdale, Florida, United States. In a championship rematch, Taipei, Taiwan defeated Maracaibo, Venezuela in the championship game. It was Taiwan's fourth straight championship.

== Teams ==
United States	International
(Florida) Broward County, Florida; District 10; Host	Ottawa, Ontario, Canada Canada
(Delaware) Georgetown, Delaware East	Mexico Central America
(Illinois) Chicago, Illinois North	(West Germany) Ramstein, West Germany Europe
(Florida) Fernandina Beach, Florida South	(Taiwan) Taipei, Taiwan Far East
(California) Grass Valley, California West	Arecibo, Puerto Rico Puerto Rico
	Maracaibo, Venezuela Venezuela

== Results ==
Upper round 1	Upper round 2	Upper round 3	Upper final	Final
1–0	(Florida) Host	14
—	(Florida) Host	5	—	West Germany	3
2–0	(Florida) Host	5
—	Florida	3
1–0	Delaware	1
—	Delaware	11
—	Canada	3
3–0	(Florida) Host	4
3–0	Taiwan	6
1–0	Taiwan	4
—	Taiwan	6	—	California	1
2–0	Taiwan	4
—	Illinois	2
2–0	Venezuela	1
1–0	Venezuela	8
—	Venezuela	5	—	Puerto Rico	4
—	Mexico	4	4–0	Taiwan	12	–
5–1	Venezuela	1	–
Lower round 1	Lower round 2	Lower round 3	Lower round 4	Lower final
0–1	West Germany	4
2–1	Venezuela	14
0–1	Mexico	16
1–1	Mexico	2	2–1	Florida	3
3–1	(Florida) Host	1
1–1	Florida	4
0–1	Canada	2	3–1	Venezuela	18	4–1	Venezuela	10
0–1	Florida	13	2–1	Delaware	0
1–1	Delaware (F/8)	8
0–1	California	2	1–1	California	6
0–1	Illinois	9	1–1	Illinois	1
0–1	Puerto Rico	7

1990 Big League World Series Champions
Taipei, Taiwan
