= 1975 Big League World Series =

Tournament details
- Country: United States
- City: Fort Lauderdale, Florida
- Dates: 9–16 August 1975
- Teams: 10

Final positions
- Champions: Taipei, Taiwan
- Runner-up: San Antonio, Texas

The 1975 Big League World Series took place August 9–16 in Fort Lauderdale, Florida, United States. It was the eighth edition of the Big League World Series. For the second consecutive year, Taipei, Taiwan, defeated San Antonio, Texas, in the championship game.

== Teams ==
United States	International
(Florida) Broward County, Florida Host	Windsor, Ontario Canada
(New York (state)) Rockland County, New York East	(West Germany) West Germany Europe
(Illinois) Chicago, Illinois North	(Taiwan) Taipei, Taiwan Far East
(Texas) San Antonio, Texas; District 20; South	Saltillo, Mexico Mexico
(Hawaii) Aiea, Hawaii West	Puerto Rico Puerto Rico

== Results ==
Upper round 1	Upper round 2	Upper round 3	Upper final	Final
1–0	Hawaii	0
—	Hawaii	9	—	Taiwan	4
1–0	Taiwan	4
—	Mexico	7
2–0	Illinois	0
1–0	Illinois	3
—	Illinois	4	—	Puerto Rico	2
2–0	Taiwan	4
—	Texas	3
2–0	Florida	0
—	Canada	1
—	West Germany	0
1–0	Canada	1
1–0	Florida	3
—	Florida (F/8)	4
—	(New York (state)) New York	3	3–0	Taiwan	2
5–1	Texas	1
Lower round 1	Lower round 2	Lower round 3	Lower round 4	Lower final
2–1	Illinois	0
1–1	Hawaii	0	2–1	Texas	4	4–1	Texas	3
0–1	Mexico	0	1–1	Texas	1	3–1	Texas	8	2–1	Florida	2
0–1	Texas	2	2–1	Puerto Rico	3
1–1	Canada	0
0–1	Puerto Rico	9	1–1	Puerto Rico	1
0–1	West Germany	0	1–1	(New York (state)) New York	2
0–1	(New York (state)) New York	4

1975 Big League World Series Champions
Taipei, Taiwan
