= 1972 Big League World Series =

Tournament details
- Country: United States
- City: Fort Lauderdale, Florida
- Dates: 14–19 August 1972
- Teams: 7

Final positions
- Champions: Orlando, Florida
- Runner-up: Inglewood, California

The 1972 Big League World Series took place from August 14–19 in Fort Lauderdale, Florida. Orlando, Florida defeated Inglewood, California in the championship game.

== Teams ==
United States	International
(Florida) Fort Lauderdale, Florida Host	Windsor, Ontario Canada
(New York (state)) New Hyde Park, New York East	(West Germany) Heidelberg, West Germany Europe
(Indiana) Gary, Indiana North	
(Florida) Orlando, Florida South
(California) Inglewood, California; Centinela Valley; West

== Results ==
Upper round 1
—	Canada	2
—	(New York (state)) New York	11
—	California	3
—	Indiana	1
—	West Germany
—	(Florida) Host
Lower round 1
0–1	Canada	5
0–1	West Germany	2
0–1	Indiana	4
1–1	(New York (state)) New York	12

Upper round 2
1–0	(New York (state)) New York	2
—	Florida	4
1–0	California	10
1–0	(Florida) Host	1
Lower round 2
2–1	California	5
1–1	(Florida) Host	1
1–1	Canada	8
2–1	(New York (state)) New York	5

Upper final
1–0	Florida	2
2–0	California	0
Lower final
3–1	California	7
2–1	Canada	5

Final
2–0	Florida	5	–
4–1	California	4	–

1972 Big League World Series Champions
Orlando, Florida
