= 1986 Big League World Series =

Baseball tournament

Tournament details
- Country: United States
- City: Fort Lauderdale, Florida
- Dates: 9–16 August 1986
- Teams: 11

Final positions
- Champions: Taipei, Taiwan
- Runners-up: Broward County, Florida

The 1986 Big League World Series took place from August 9–16 in Fort Lauderdale, Florida, United States. Maracaibo, Venezuela defeated Broward County, Florida twice in the championship game.

== Teams ==
United States	International
(Florida) Broward County, Florida; District 10; Host	Canada Canada
(New Jersey) Middletown, New Jersey East	(Egypt) Cairo, Egypt Europe
(Illinois) Chicago, Illinois North	(Taiwan) Taipei, Taiwan Far East
(Texas) Beaumont, Texas South	Mexico Mexico
(California) San Bernardino, California West	Puerto Rico Puerto Rico
	Maracaibo, Venezuela Venezuela

== Results ==
Upper round 1	Upper round 2	Upper round 3	Upper final	Final
1–0	Taiwan	6
—	Taiwan	4	—	Puerto Rico	7
1–0	Puerto Rico
—	Venezuela	2
1–0	Texas
—	Texas	10
—	Illinois	7
2–0	Texas	3
2–0	Florida	4
1–0	New Jersey	0
—	New Jersey	16	—	Florida	9
1–0	Florida	13
—	Egypt	6
1–0	California	2
1–0	Canada	1
—	Canada	7	—	California	6
3–0	Florida	2	4
—	Mexico	2
6–1	Venezuela	6	6
Lower round 1	Lower round 2	Lower round 3	Lower round 4	Lower round 5	Lower final
1–1	Puerto Rico	0
1–1	New Jersey	0	3–1	Taiwan	7	2–1	Texas	2
1–1	Taiwan	7	2–1	Taiwan	10	4–1	Taiwan	6	5–1	Venezuela	12
0–1	Mexico	0	4–1	Venezuela	7
1–1	California	1
1–1	Canada	3	3–1	Venezuela	3
0–1	Illinois	2	2–1	Venezuela	7
0–1	Egypt	4	1–1	Venezuela	4
0–1	Venezuela	17

1986 Big League World Series Champions
Maracaibo, Venezuela
