= 1996 Big League World Series =

Tournament details
- Country: United States
- City: Fort Lauderdale, Florida
- Dates: 9–17 August 1996
- Teams: 11

Final positions
- Champions: Kaohsiung, Taiwan
- Runner-up: Burbank, Illinois

The 1996 Big League World Series took place from August 9–17 in Fort Lauderdale, Florida, United States. Kaohsiung, Taiwan defeated Burbank, Illinois in the championship game. It was Taiwan's fourth straight championship,

== Teams ==
United States	International
(Florida) Broward County, Florida; District 10; Host	Surrey British Columbia, Canada; Whalley; Canada
(Delaware) Dover, Delaware East	Mexico City, Mexico Central America
(Illinois) Burbank, Illinois; District 15; North	(Germany) Ramstein, Germany; KMC; Europe
(Texas) Midland, Texas South	(Taiwan) Kaohsiung, Taiwan Far East
(Hawaii) Pearl City, Hawaii West	Puerto Rico; Vista Hermosa; Puerto Rico
	Maracaibo, Venezuela Venezuela

== Results ==
United States Bracket

First Round
—	Florida	10
—	Delaware	1
Lower round 1
0–1	Delaware	3
0–1	Texas	2

Second Round
1–0	Florida	3
—	Hawaii	5
—	Illinois	4
—	Texas	3
Lower round 2
1–1	Delaware	1
1–1	Florida	9

Semifinals
1–0	Hawaii	0
1–0	Illinois	13
Lower final
1–1	Hawaii	5
2–1	Florida	2

United States Championship
2–0	Illinois	2	6
2–1	Hawaii	10	3

International Bracket

Upper round 1	Upper round 2	Upper final	International Championship
1–0	Puerto Rico	4
—	Puerto Rico	6	—	Taiwan	5
—	Venezuela	4	1–0	Taiwan	3
1–0	Mexico	0
1–0	Canada	0
—	Canada	13	—	Mexico	3
—	Germany	3
2–0	Taiwan	3	—
3–1	Canada	0	—
Lower round 1	Lower round 2	Lower round 3	Lower final
1–1	Mexico	1
1–1	Canada	7	2–1	Canada	12
1–1	Puerto Rico	2	2–1	Venezuela	4
0–1	Germany	0	1–1	Venezuela	10
0–1	Venezuela	14

Elimination round

Semifinals
2–0	Illinois	2 · 6
2–1	Hawaii	10 · 3
2–0	Taiwan	3
3–1	Canada	0

World Championship
3–1	Illinois	0
3–0	Taiwan	4

1996 Big League World Series Champions
Kaohsiung, Taiwan
