= Big League World Series (Latin America Region) =

Latin America Region
- Most recent season or competition: 2016 Big League World Series
- Sport: Baseball
- Founded: 1998
- Folded: 2016
- No. of teams: 12
- Last champions: Willemstad, Curaçao
- Most titles: Venezuela (6)

The Big League World Series (BLWS) Latin America Region was one of four International regions that sent teams to the World Series. The region's participation in the BLWS could be dated back to 1970. Little League Baseball and Softball would later terminate the Big League division after the 2016 World Series.

== Latin America Region Countries ==
- Aruba
- Colombia
- Curaçao
- Dominican Republic
- El Salvador
- Guatemala
- Jamaica
- Mexico
- Panama
- Puerto Rico
- Venezuela
- US Virgin Islands

== Region Champions ==
At one point, the tournament featured 11 teams, 3 of which were from Latin America. The champions of Mexico, Puerto Rico, and Venezuela each received automatic berths. In 1989 the Central America region was created, Mexico and Panama would play a best of 3 series to determine the champion. In 1998 all three regions were combined to form the Latin America Region.

Beginning in 2006, Mexico and Puerto Rico alternated between automatic berths. In years without an auto-bid they entered the Latin America tournament.

Mexico Region Champions

Year	City	BLWS	Record
1974		Round 2	0–2
1975	Saltillo	Round 1	0–2
1976		Round 2	0–2
1977	Monterrey	Round 2	0–2
1978	Monterrey	Round 3	1–2
1979		Round 2	1–2
1980		Round 3	0–2
1981		Round 3	0–2
1982		Round 4	1–2
1983	Matamoros	Round 2	0–2
1984		Round 1	0–2
1985	Saltillo	Round 2	1–2
1986		Round 2	0–2
1987	Monterrey	Round 2	0–2
1988		Round 2	0–2
2007	Monterrey	Int'l Final	4–1
2009	Mexicali	Int'l Final	3–2
2011	Monterrey	Pool stage	2–2
2013	Tlaquepaque	Pool stage	2–2
2015	San Nicolás	Round 3	1–2

Puerto Rico Region Champions

Year	City	BLWS	Record
1970	San Juan	Fourth Place	2–2
1973	San Juan	Round 2	1–2
1974	San Juan	Round 4	2–2
1975		Fourth Place	2–2
1976		Round 3	2–2
1977		Round 2	0–2
1978		Round 2	0–2
1979		Round 3	2–2
1980		Round 3	1–2
1981		Runner-up	5–2
1982	San Juan	Champions	5–0
1983		Round 2	1–2
1984		Round 2	0–2
1985	Carolina	Runner-up	4–2
1986		Round 4	1–2
1987	San Juan	Round 4	2–2
1988		Round 3	2–2
1989	Carolina	Round 3	1–2
1990	Arecibo	Round 1	0–2
1991	Mayaguez	Round 1	0–2
1992		Round 1	0–2
1993	Guayama	Round 4	1–2
1994		Round 2	1–2
1995		Round 3	1–2
1996	Río Piedras	Round 2	1–2
1997	Río Piedras	Int'l Final	5–2
2006	San Juan	Runner-up	5–2
2008	San Juan	Runner-up	4–1
2010	San Juan	Champions	6–0
2012	San Juan	Champions	6–0
2014	Guayama	Runner-up	5–1
2016	Guayama	Int'l Final	2–2

Venezuela Region Champions

Year	City	BLWS	Record
1978		Round 3	1–2
1979		Round 2	0–2
1980		Round 4	1–2
1981		Round 4	3–2
1982		Runner-up	4–2
1983	Maracaibo	Third Place	4–2
1984	Maracaibo	Runner-up	6–2
1985	Maracaibo	Fourth Place	2–2
1986	Maracaibo	Champions	8–1
1987	Maracaibo	Round 4	1–2
1988	Maracaibo	Fourth Place	3–2
1989	Maracaibo	Runner-up	5–2
1990	Maracaibo	Runner-up	5–2
1991	Maracaibo	Runner-up	3–2
1992	Maracaibo	Runner-up	4–2
1993	Maracaibo	Int'l Final	4–2
1994	Maracaibo	Round 3	1–2
1995	Maracaibo	Int'l Final	3–2
1996	Maracaibo	Round 3	2–2
1997	Maracaibo	Runner-up	4–2

=== Results by Country (Automatic Bids) ===
Country	BLWS Appearances	BLWS Championships	BLWS Record	PCT
Puerto Rico	32	3	70–56	.556
Venezuela	20	1	64–39	.621
Mexico	20	0	16–39	.291
Total		4	150–134	.528

Central America Region Champions

Year	City	BLWS	Record
1989	Panama City, Panama	Third Place	3–2
1990	Mexico	Round 2	1–2
1991	Panama	Round 3	2–2
1992	Mexico	Round 1	0–2
1993	Mexico	Round 2	1–2
1994	Mexico	Fourth Place	2–2
1995	Zapopan, Mexico	Round 2	0–2
1996	Mexico City, Mexico	Round 4	1–2
1997	Guadalajara, Mexico	Round 3	0–2

Latin America Region Champions

Year	City	BLWS	Record
1998	Maracaibo, Venezuela	Runner-up	3–1
1999	Puerto Rico	Int'l Final	2–2
2000	Yabucoa, Puerto Rico	Pool stage	2–1
2001	Valencia, Venezuela	Runner-up	4–1
2002	San Juan, Puerto Rico	Champions	5–1
2003	Guadalupe, Mexico	Pool stage	2–2
2004	Nogales, Mexico	Pool stage	1–3
2005	Maracaibo, Venezuela	Semifinals	4–1
2006	Coclé, Panama	Pool stage	2–2
2007	San Juan, Puerto Rico	Runner-up	4–2
2008	Santiago, Dominican Republic	Int'l Final	3–1
2009	Santiago, Dominican Republic	Champions	6–0
2010	Coclé, Panama	Int'l Final	3–2
2011	San Juan, Puerto Rico (Host)	Runner-up	5–1
2012	Maracaibo, Venezuela	Int'l Final	3–2
2013	Maracaibo, Venezuela	Runner-up	4–2
2014	Maracaibo, Venezuela	Int'l Final	3–2
2015	Guayama, Puerto Rico (Host)	Champions	5–1
2016	Willemstad, Curaçao	Round 3	2–2

=== Results by Country ===
Table includes results from Central America and Latin America region.

Country	Region Championships	BLWS Championships	BLWS Record	PCT
Mexico	9	0	8–19	.296
Venezuela	6	0	21–9	.700
Puerto Rico	4	1	13–6	.684
Panama	4	0	10–8	.556
(Puerto Rico) Host Team(s)	2	1	10–2	.833
Dominican Republic	2	1	9–1	.900
Curaçao	1	0	2–2	.500
Total	28	3	73–47	.608

== See also ==
Latin America Region in other Little League divisions

- Little League – Latin America
- Little League – Caribbean
- Little League – Mexico
- Intermediate League
- Junior League
- Senior League – Latin America
- Senior League – Caribbean
