= Cumberland, New Jersey =

Populated place in Cumberland County, New Jersey, US

- Unincorporated community
- Location in Cumberland County (Inset: Cumberland County in New Jersey) Cumberland (New Jersey) Cumberland (the United States)
- Coordinates: 39°22′11″N 74°56′27″W
- Country: United States
- State: New Jersey
- County: Cumberland
- Township: Maurice River
- Elevation: 39 ft (12 m)
- ZIP Code: 08332
- GNIS feature ID: 0875778

Cumberland is a small unincorporated community located within Maurice River Township in Cumberland County, in the U.S. state of New Jersey. For statistical purposes, Cumberland and neighboring Hesstown together comprise the Cumberland-Hesstown census-designated place.

Cumberland contains only a few hundred households, concentrated primarily on Route 49 and Hesstown/Port Elizabeth-Cumberland Road. The community is bordered by Millville and Port Elizabeth in Cumberland County and Estell Manor in Atlantic County. Cumberland is almost exclusively a residential and rural community with only two retail storefronts and several cottage industries. Most residents commute to nearby Millville, Vineland, Bridgeton, or one of the county's three prisons for employment.

The greater part of Cumberland is Peaslee Wildlife Management Area, New Jersey's second-largest game reserve. Cumberland is also the home to Cumberland United Methodist Church and graveyard, a station of the New Jersey Department of Roads and Highways, and the Cumberland Volunteer Fire Company.

Like other small communities located within Maurice River Township, Cumberland's exact boundaries are unspecified. It does not possess its own ZIP code and is processes it mail through the 08332 Millville United States Post Office. As a result, it is frequently omitted from maps. For this reason, and due to its remote rural location and lack of retail businesses, many lifelong residents of Cumberland County are unaware of the existence of the community of Cumberland. The exact population of Cumberland is unknown because the United States Census Bureau does not delineate the populations of the various settlements within Maurice River Township. The MRT Assessor's office also confirmed the precise number of homes in Cumberland is unknown. Extensive research of historical deeds and other documents located at the Cumberland County Court House dating back several hundred years would be necessary in order to establish the exact boundaries of the town. The Assessor's office indicated that the Cumberland Volunteer Fire Company services district F-04, which includes Cumberland and portions of Milmay. Based on the number of houses located in that district, the assessor estimated the number of households in Cumberland is 200.

The settlement of Cumberland built up around the Cumberland Iron Furnace in the 19th century. Cumberland is located in the within New Jersey's ecologically sensitive watershed along the Manumuskin River. In 1810, at the western border of Cumberland, the Manumuskin River was dammed to create what is now known as the Cumberland Pond. The pond was originally created to provide power for the Cumberland Iron Furnace, which no longer exists. It is now a popular location for fishing, canoeing and bird-watching.

== Gallery ==
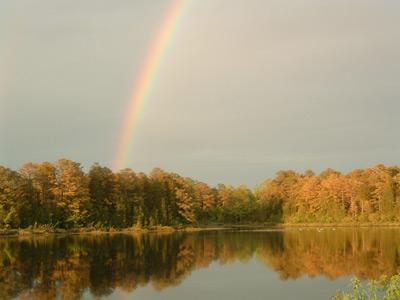
Cumberland Pond in Spring

Cumberland Pond in Winter

Cumberland Pond in Summer

Cumberland Pond in Fall

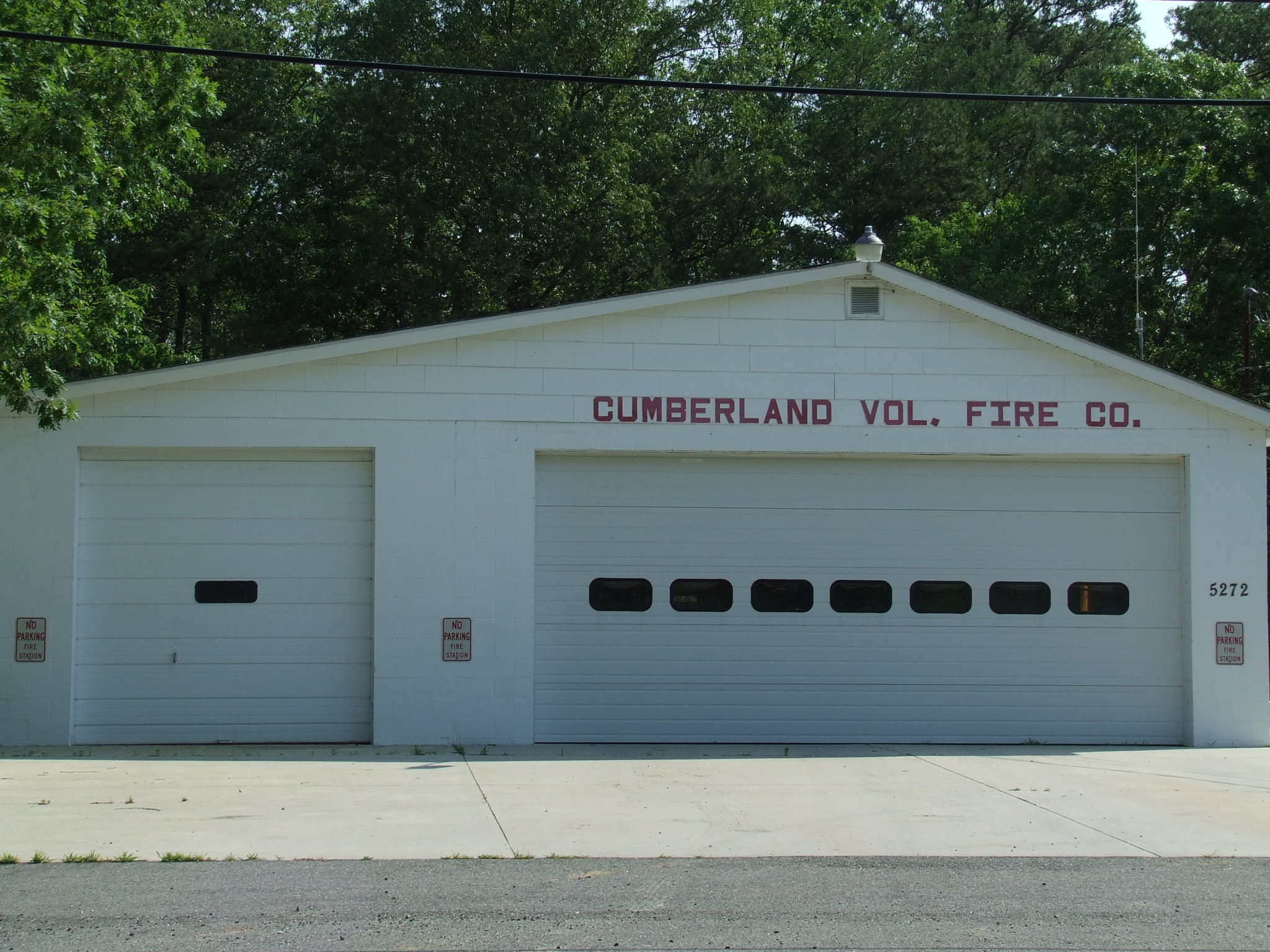
Cumberland Volunteer Fire Company

Cumberland United Methodist Church

== Education ==
The Cumberland-Hesstown CDP is in the Maurice River Township School District.
