= 1999 in baseball =

The following are the baseball events of the year 1999 throughout the world.

== Champions ==
=== Major League Baseball ===
- World Series: New York Yankees over Atlanta Braves (4-0); Mariano Rivera, MVP

Division Series (ALDS, NLDS)
1	NY Yankees	3
3	Texas	0
American League
2	Cleveland	2
4	Boston	3
1	Atlanta	3
3	Houston	1
National League
2	Arizona	1
4	NY Mets	3

League Championship Series (NLCS, ALCS)
1	NY Yankees	4
4	Boston	1
1	Atlanta	4
4	NY Mets	2

World Series
AL1	NY Yankees	4
NL1	Atlanta	0

Note: Two teams in the same division could not meet in the division series.

- American League Championship Series MVP: Orlando Hernández
  - American League Division Series:
- National League Championship Series MVP: Eddie Pérez
  - National League Division Series
- All-Star Game, July 13 at Fenway Park: American League, 4–1; Pedro Martínez, MVP

=== Other champions ===
- Caribbean World Series: Tigres del Licey (Dominican Republic)
- College World Series: Miami (Florida)
- Cuban National Series: Santiago de Cuba over Industriales
- European Championship: Netherlands over Italy (3-0)
- Japan Series: Fukuoka Daiei Hawks over Chunichi Dragons (4-1)
- Korean Series: Hanwha Eagles over Lotte Giants (4-1)
- Big League World Series: Orlando, Florida
- Junior League World Series: Arroyo, Puerto Rico
- Little League World Series: Hirakata, Osaka, Japan
- Senior League World Series: Conway, Florida
- Pan American Games: Cuba over USA (5-1)
- Taiwan Series: Wei Chuan Dragons over Koos Group Whales

== Awards and honors ==
- Baseball Hall of Fame
  - George Brett
  - Orlando Cepeda
  - Nestor Chylak
  - Nolan Ryan
  - Frank Selee
  - Joe Williams
  - Robin Yount
- Most Valuable Player
  - Iván Rodríguez (AL) Texas Rangers
  - Chipper Jones (NL) Atlanta Braves
- Cy Young Award
  - Pedro Martínez (AL) Boston Red Sox
  - Randy Johnson (NL) Arizona Diamondbacks
- Rookie of the Year Award
  - Carlos Beltrán (AL) Kansas City Royals
  - Scott Williamson (NL) Cincinnati Reds
- Manager of the Year Award
  - Jimy Williams (AL) Boston Red Sox
  - Jack McKeon (NL) Cincinnati Reds
- Woman Executive of the Year (major or minor league): Judy Ellis, Missoula Osprey, Pioneer League
- Gold Glove Award
  - Rafael Palmeiro (1B) (AL)
  - Roberto Alomar (2B) (AL)
  - Scott Brosius (3B) (AL)
  - Omar Vizquel (SS) (AL)
  - Shawn Green (OF) (AL)
  - Ken Griffey Jr. (OF) (AL)
  - Bernie Williams (OF) (AL)
  - Iván Rodríguez (C) (AL)
  - Mike Mussina (P) (AL)
  - J. T. Snow (1B) (NL)
  - Pokey Reese (2B) (NL)
  - Robin Ventura (3B) (NL)
  - Rey Ordóñez (SS) (NL)
  - Steve Finley (OF) (NL)
  - Andruw Jones (OF) (NL)
  - Larry Walker (OF) (NL)
  - Mike Lieberthal (C) (NL)
  - Greg Maddux (P) (NL)

== MLB statistical leaders ==
	American League		National League
Type	Name	Stat	Name	Stat
AVG	Nomar Garciaparra BOS	.357	Larry Walker COL	.379
HR	Ken Griffey Jr. SEA	48	Mark McGwire STL	65
RBI	Manny Ramírez CLE	165	Mark McGwire STL	147
Wins	Pedro Martínez^{1} BOS	23	Mike Hampton HOU	22
ERA	Pedro Martínez^{1} BOS	2.07	Randy Johnson AZ	2.48
Ks	Pedro Martínez^{1} BOS	313	Randy Johnson AZ	364

^{1}American League Triple Crown Pitching Winner

== Major League Baseball final standings ==
American League
Rank	Club	Wins	Losses	Win %	GB
East Division
1st	New York Yankees	98	64	.605	--
2nd	Boston Red Sox *	94	68	.580	4.0
3rd	Toronto Blue Jays	84	78	.519	14.0
4th	Baltimore Orioles	78	84	.481	20.0
5th	Tampa Bay Devil Rays	69	93	.426	29.0
Central Division
1st	Cleveland Indians	97	65	.599	--
2nd	Chicago White Sox	75	86	.466	21.5
3rd	Detroit Tigers	69	92	.429	27.5
4th	Kansas City Royals	64	97	.398	32.5
5th	Minnesota Twins	63	97	.394	33.0
West Division
1st	Texas Rangers	95	67	.586	--
2nd	Oakland Athletics	87	75	.537	8.0
3rd	Seattle Mariners	79	83	.488	16.0
4th	Anaheim Angels	70	92	.432	25.0

National League
Rank	Club	Wins	Losses	Win %	GB
East Division
1st	Atlanta Braves	103	59	.636	--
2nd	New York Mets *	97	66	.595	6.5
3rd	Philadelphia Phillies	77	85	.475	26.0
4th	Montreal Expos	68	94	.420	35.0
5th	Florida Marlins	64	98	.395	39.0
Central Division
1st	Houston Astros	97	65	.599	--
2nd	Cincinnati Reds	96	67	.589	1.5
3rd	Pittsburgh Pirates	78	83	.484	18.5
4th	St. Louis Cardinals	75	86	.466	21.5
5th	Milwaukee Brewers	74	87	.460	22.5
6th	Chicago Cubs	67	95	.414	30.0
West Division
1st	Arizona Diamondbacks	100	62	.617	--
2nd	San Francisco Giants	86	76	.531	14.0
3rd	Los Angeles Dodgers	77	85	.475	23.0
4th	San Diego Padres	74	88	.457	26.0
5th	Colorado Rockies	72	90	.444	28.0

- The asterisk denotes the club that won the wild card for its respective league. The New York Mets defeated the Cincinnati Reds 5-0 in a one-game playoff to determine the NL wild card.

== Events ==
=== January ===
- January 5 – Nolan Ryan, George Brett and Robin Yount are elected to the Baseball Hall of Fame by the Baseball Writers' Association of America. It is the first time since 1936 that three players are elected simultaneously on their first try. Carlton Fisk finishes 4th in the voting, missing election by 43 votes.
- January 26 – The Oakland Athletics signed outfielder Tim Raines as a free agent.

=== February ===
- February 2 – The San Diego Padres trade Greg Vaughn to the Cincinnati Reds. Vaughn had hit 50 home runs for the Padres the previous season, making him the first player in major league history to be traded after a 50-homer season.
- February 5 – MLB honors each league's best hitter with an award named after Hank Aaron. The all-time home run king learns about the honor on his 65th birthday at an event which includes US President Bill Clinton and Hall of Famers Ernie Banks and Reggie Jackson.
- February 15 – The Cincinnati Reds announce that they are dropping their long-standing policy of no facial hair for players. The change is the result of a talk between Reds owner Marge Schott and newly acquired outfielder Greg Vaughn.
- February 18:
  - The U.S. Postal Service issues a Jackie Robinson stamp as part of their "Celebrate the Century" program. Robinson is selected to represent the 1940s, and is the second baseball player chosen. Babe Ruth, chosen in May 1998, represents the 1920s.
  - The Yankees end the trade rumors by acquiring Cy Young Award winner Roger Clemens from the Toronto Blue Jays in exchange for pitchers David Wells and Graeme Lloyd, and infielder Homer Bush.
- February 21 – Florida Marlins rookie third baseman Mike Lowell, acquired from the New York Yankees on February 1, undergoes surgery for testicular cancer after a small mass is found during a routine exam.

=== March ===
- March 2 – Orlando Cepeda, Frank Selee, Smokey Joe Williams and Nestor Chylak are elected to the Hall of Fame by the Veterans Committee.
- March 7 – In a historic agreement, it is announced that the Baltimore Orioles travel to Cuba for a March 28 exhibition game against the Cuba national team in Havana. The Cuban team travels to the US for a return contest at a future date. It is the first time in 40 years that Americans play a professional game in Cuba.
- March 10 – Yankees manager Joe Torre is diagnosed with prostate cancer. While he is undergoing treatment, the team is run by coach Don Zimmer.
- March 21 – The Toronto Blue Jays signed pitcher Vicente Palacios, despite the fact he hadn't pitched on the professional level since 1995. He fails to stick with the team out of spring training, but later signs a minor league deal with the New York Mets.
- March 28 – The Orioles make the first visit to Cuba by major leaguers since 1959, and defeat a team of Cuban amateurs by a score of 3–2 in 11 innings. Pitcher José Contreras hurls eight innings of 2–hit, 10–K ball in relief for the Cubans, while catcher Charles Johnson hits a two–run home run, and DH Harold Baines drives in the winning run for the Orioles. The two teams play a rematch at Camden Yards in Baltimore on May 3.

=== April ===
- April 4 – In the first season opener ever played outside of the United States or Canada, the Colorado Rockies defeat the San Diego Padres, 8–2, before an overflow crowd of 27,104 in Monterrey, Mexico. Outfielder Dante Bichette has four hits, including a home run, and four RBI for the winners. Local hero Vinny Castilla also has four hits for the Rockies, while Darryl Kile picks up the victory.
- April 11 – The Tampa Bay Devil Rays defeat the Boston Red Sox‚ 5–4‚ as pitcher Scott Aldred picks up the win in relief. The victory ends Aldred's major league record streak of 50 appearances without a win‚ loss or save.
- April 19 – The Baltimore Orioles' Cal Ripken Jr. is placed on the disabled list for the first time in his 19–year career because of irritation in his lower back. Ripken's record consecutive game streak ended in September 1998 at 2,632.
- April 20:
  - Cincinnati Reds owner Marge Schott agrees to sell her controlling interest in the Reds to a group headed by Carl H. Lindner, ending her 14–year tenure. The group pays a total of $67 million.
  - The Nolan Ryan Museum opens in Alvin, Texas.
  - The Colorado Rockies postpone the first of 2 consecutive home games against the Montreal Expos in the aftermath of the Columbine High School massacre.
- April 23:
  - The St. Louis Cardinals defeat the Los Angeles Dodgers 12–5, as third baseman Fernando Tatís sets a major league record by hitting two grand slams in a single inning. His two homers come in St. Louis' 11–run third inning. Tatís, with eight runs batted in, shattered the mark for an inning set 109 years before by Ed Cartwright, who drove seven runs in an inning while playing for the 1890 St. Louis Browns. After that, the modern-day six RBI mark for an inning was shared by Fred Merkle (NY Giants, 1911), Indian Bob Johnson (Philadelphia A's, 1937) and Jim Ray Hart (SF Giants, 1970). Besides, Dodgers pitcher Chan Ho Park becomes the first 20th century pitcher – and only the second ever – to surrender two grand slams in a single frame. The first is Bill Phillips of the Pittsburgh Pirates, who does so in 1890. Park is the 36th major-leaguer to serve up two grand slams to the same player in his career.
  - The Milwaukee Brewers sink the Pittsburgh Pirates, 9–1, as pitcher Steve Woodard hurls the complete game victory. The win ends Milwaukee's NL record streak of 113 games without a complete game.
- April 28 – Larry Walker hits three home runs helping the Colorado Rockies beat the St. Louis Cardinals 9–7.

=== May ===
- May 3:
  - In a 12–11, 10-inning loss to the Oakland Athletics, Boston Red Sox rookie Creighton Gubanich becomes only the fourth player to hit a grand slam for his first major league hit.
  - The Pittsburgh Pirates defeat the San Francisco Giants, 9–8. In a losing effort, Jeff Kent collects five hits for the Giants while hitting for the cycle. Kent is just the second player to do so in Three Rivers Stadium, joining Joe Torre, who did it on June 27, 1973.
- May 9:
  - The New York Yankees defeat the Seattle Mariners 6–1. Reliever Mike Stanton makes his first major league start for the Yankees, ending his major league record streak of 552 consecutive relief appearances prior to his first start. The previous record of 443 is set by San Francisco Giants pitcher Gary Lavelle.
  - Florida St. junior second baseman Marshall McDougall goes 7-for-7, with an NCAA-record six consecutive home runs and 16 runs batted in, as the Seminoles defeat Maryland 26–2. McDougall opens the game with a single. His mark breaks the home run record set by Henry Rochelle of Campbell, who hit five homers in a game in 1985. The RBI mark was previously held by Jim LaFountain of Louisville, who scored 14 runs batted in against Western Kentucky in 1976.
- May 10 – The Boston Red Sox defeat the Seattle Mariners, 12–4, as shortstop Nomar Garciaparra leads the way with three home runs, including two grand slams. Garciaparra drives home 10 of Boston's runs as he slugs a bases-loaded grand slam in the 1st inning, a two-run shot in the 3rd, and another grand slam in the 8th. Garciaparra is the first Red Sox since Jim Tabor in 1939 to hit two slams in a game, and just the ninth in major league history. Fernando Tatís is the last player to do it, almost a month earlier. Before that, Robin Ventura hit two in 1995.
- May 12:
  - Pedro Martínez strikes out 15 batters for the second consecutive game in a Boston Red Sox 9–2 victory over the Seattle Mariners.
  - The Anaheim Angels shut out the New York Yankees, 1–0, behind the combined three-hit pitching of Chuck Finley and Troy Percival. Finley strikes out 11 Yankees in his eight innings of work, including four in the third inning. He is the 33rd pitcher in major league history to strike out four batters in a single frame.
- May 17 – At The Ballpark in Arlington, the Tampa Bay Devil Rays beat the Texas Rangers, 13–3, as Rays' first baseman Fred McGriff extends his major league record by hitting a home run in his 35th big league stadium.
- May 19 – In a record-setting outing, the Cincinnati Reds beat the Colorado Rockies, 24–12, stroking 28 hits in the process. Seven players in the Reds lineup get three or more hits apiece and the 36 runs scored sets a Coors Field record. Cincinnati's Jeffrey Hammonds hits three home runs, while Sean Casey hits a pair of three-run homers to drive in six runs and reaches base in all seven plate appearances, tying a 20th-century record. In addition, teammate Mike Cameron ties a major league mark with eight plate appearances in a nine-inning game. The 36 runs scored in the contest represents the third-highest total in the major leagues since the turn of the 20th century, while the 81 total bases set a new major league standard. With 28 hits, the Reds tie a mark originally set on May 13, 1902, while tying the National League record with seven players with three or more hits matching the 1928 Pittsburgh Pirates (June 12) and the 1989 Cincinnati Reds (August 3). The Rockies are also the first team to score 12 or more runs in a game and lose by the same difference in the same game since the New York Giants beat the Reds, 25–13, in 1901. Colorado's Larry Walker extends his hitting streak to 20 games and raises his average to .431.
- May 20 – The New York Mets sweep the Milwaukee Brewers in a doubleheader, winning the first game 11–10, and the second 10–1. Robin Ventura hits a grand slam in each contest, becoming the first player in major league history to do so in both ends of a doubleheader. Ventura also becomes the first player to hit a pair of grand slams on the same day on two separate occasions.

=== June ===
- June 9 – New York Mets manager Bobby Valentine is ejected in the 12th inning of a 14 inning marathon with the Toronto Blue Jays when Mike Piazza gets called for catcher's interference on Craig Grebeck. An inning later, Valentine returns to the dugout in a disguise. Unamused, Major League Baseball fines Valentine $10,000 and suspends him three games. The Mets go on to win the game 4–3.
- June 25:
  - The St. Louis Cardinals beat the Arizona Diamondbacks, 1–0, as rookie pitcher José Jiménez hurls the first no-hitter of the season. The Cardinals score the lone run on a broken bat single with two outs in the ninth inning. Jiménez posts eight strikeouts in the contest, while losing pitcher Randy Johnson strikes out 14, including the 2500th of his career. Jiménez walks two and hits a batter in becoming the first rookie to toss a no-hitter since Wilson Álvarez in 1991.
  - Jesse Orosco of the Baltimore Orioles makes his 1,051st relief appearance to break Kent Tekulve's major league record.
- June 26 – Sammy Sosa hits his 300th career home run.
- June 27 – The Seattle Mariners defeat the Texas Rangers, 5–2, in the final game played at the Kingdome. Ken Griffey Jr. hits the final home run in the stadium's history.
- June 28 – Hack Wilson ups his runs batted in total for the 1930 season to 191. 69 years after the event, an RBI is added by the commissioner's office, which also gives Babe Ruth six additional walks, raising his career-record total to 2,062. "There is no doubt that Hack Wilson's RBI total should be 191", commissioner Bud Selig says. "I am sensitive to the historical significance that accompanies the correction of such a prestigious record, especially after so many years have passed, but it is important to get it right." The missing RBI comes from the second game of a doubleheader between Wilson's Chicago Cubs and the Cincinnati Reds on July 28, 1930, where Charlie Grimm is credited with two RBI in the game and Wilson with none. Ted Williams ranks second in walks behind Ruth, trailing by 43, while Rickey Henderson is third, 134 behind Ruth.

=== July ===
- July 5 – The Cardinals defeat the Diamondbacks 1–0, as José Jiménez hurls a two-hitter to defeat Randy Johnson. Jiménez no-hit the Diamondbacks in his last appearance against them (June 25). Johnson loses his 3rd game in a row, during which Arizona does not score a run and only make three hits. He strikes out 12 Cardinals to tie Dwight Gooden's NL mark of 43 strikeouts over three starts. He also reaches 200 strikeouts for the year and ends St. Louis rookie Joe McEwing's 25-game hitting streak, the 5th-longest ever for a rookie.
- July 6 – The White Sox lose to the Royals 8–7. Chicago outfielder Chris Singleton hits for the cycle, becoming the first rookie to do so since Oddibe McDowell in 1985 and just the 16th since 1900.
- July 9 – The uniform Lou Gehrig wore when he made his famous "luckiest man on earth" speech on July 4, 1939 is sold for $451,541 at auction. Leland's spokesman Marty Appel says the flannel pinstripe uniform worn by the Hall of Fame first baseman is purchased by a South Florida man who does not want his name to be made public. The winning bid is made over the phone. The previous day, Carlton Fisk's home run ball that won Game Six of the 1975 World Series for the Boston Red Sox is sold for $113,273.
- July 13:
  - The Major League Baseball All-Century Team is announced prior to the All-Star Game. Many members of the selected team, including Bob Gibson, Willie Mays, Brooks Robinson, Mike Schmidt and Ted Williams, are on the field for the festivities.
  - The American League defeats the National League, 4–1, to win the All-Star Game at Fenway Park in Boston. Red Sox pitcher Pedro Martínez is named the game's MVP as he strikes out the first four hitters to bat against him, and five of the six he faces in his two innings of work. The game begins 15 minutes late as Hall of Fame outfielder Teddy Williams rides out in a cart for the first-pitch ceremony. Players from both teams surround the former Red Sox star in a spontaneous display of homage.
- July 14 – During the construction of the Milwaukee Brewers new stadium Miller Park, a crane called Big Blue collapses while lifting a 450-ton roof section for the stadium, killing three iron workers. The accident delays the stadium's opening by a year to 2001 and the Brewers also postpone their home game against the Kansas City Royals scheduled for the following night.
- July 15 – In the Seattle Mariners' first-ever game at Safeco Field, the San Diego Padres defeat the Mariners 3–2, scoring two runs in the top of the ninth to win. Safeco Field is the first MLB stadium to open with an inter-league game.
- July 18 – David Cone pitches a perfect game for the New York Yankees in a 6–0 win over the Montreal Expos. Don Larsen delivered the game's ceremonial first pitch in celebration of Yogi Berra Day at Yankee Stadium.
- July 25 – George Brett, Robin Yount, Nolan Ryan and Orlando Cepeda are inducted into the Hall of Fame in Cooperstown, New York.

=== August ===
- August 5 – The San Diego Padres defeat the Cardinals 10–3, despite a pair of home runs by Mark McGwire, including the 500th of his career. McGwire becomes the first player in history to hit his 400th and 500th homers in successive seasons.
- August 6:
  - San Diego's Tony Gwynn joins the 3,000 hit club, becoming the 22nd player to do so. Dan Smith of the Montreal Expos gives up the historic hit as Gwynn goes 4-for-5 in a 12–10 San Diego victory.
  - Carlos Delgado hits 3 home runs, helping the Toronto Blue Jays beat Texas Rangers 5–4.
- August 7:
  - Just one day after Tony Gwynn reaches the historic milestone, the Tampa Bay Devil Rays' Wade Boggs also gets the 3,000th hit of his career in Tampa Bay's 15–10 loss to Cleveland. Besides, Boggs becomes the first player in history to hit a home run for his 3,000th hit.
  - The Toronto Blue Jays signed undrafted free agent Kevin Cash. Cash would achieve greater fame as the manager of the Tampa Bay Rays.
- August 9 – A total of five grand slams are hit on the day, marking the first time it happens in 129 years of major league baseball. The bases-loaded pokes are hit by Fernando Tatís (St. Louis, against Philadelphia), José Vidro (Montreal, against San Diego), Mike Lowell (Florida, against San Francisco), Bernie Williams (Yankees, against Oakland) and Jay Buhner (Seattle, against the White Sox).
- August 15 – In the first inning of a 10–2 victory over the Detroit Tigers at Tiger Stadium, Chuck Finley of the Anaheim Angels becomes the first pitcher to strike out four batters in one inning more than once. After Kimera Bartee leads off with a single, Finley strikes out Deivi Cruz; a wild pitch allows Bartee to advance to second base. Juan Encarnación and Dean Palmer fan next, the latter reaching base on Finley's second wild pitch, and finally, Finley strikes out Tony Clark to end the inning. Finley strikes out four batters in the third inning of a 1–0 victory over the New York Yankees on May 12 of this season; against the Texas Rangers on April 16, 2000, he records a third four-strikeout inning (the 3rd inning) while with the Cleveland Indians.
- August 17 – St. Louis sends José Jiménez down to AAA Memphis less than two months after his no-hitter against Arizona. He joins Bobo Holloman as the only pitcher to go to the minors in the same year he pitched a no-hitter.
- August 26 – Randy Johnson reaches 300 strikeouts in record time, notching nine in seven innings to help the Arizona Diamondbacks beat the Florida Marlins 12–2.
- August 30:
  - The Mets roll over the Astros 17–1, as Edgardo Alfonzo goes 6-for-6, a club record, with a double, three home runs, five RBI and six runs scored. The six runs scored ties the modern major league mark. Alfonzo is only the fifth player ever to hit three home runs while going 6-for-6.
  - Former player Billy Bean comes out of the closet and announces his homosexuality. He is the first living player to publicly acknowledge that he is gay.

=== September ===
- September 2 – Cal Ripken hits 400th career home run helping the Baltimore Orioles beat the Tampa Bay Devil Rays 11–6.
- September 3 – Terry Collins resigns as manager of the Anaheim Angels. He is replaced by bench coach Joe Maddon.
- September 4 – In a 22-3 blowout over the Philadelphia Phillies, the Cincinnati Reds tie an NL record by hitting nine home runs in the contest: two by Eddie Taubensee, and one apiece by Aaron Boone, Dmitri Young, Jeffrey Hammonds, Greg Vaughn, Pokey Reese, Brian Johnson and Mark Lewis.
- September 7 – Two native Canadian pitchers oppose each other as starters for the first time in 26 years. Florida Marlins pitcher Ryan Dempster, from British Columbia, faces off against Los Angeles Dodgers pitcher Éric Gagné, from Quebec. The two go together while competing on Canada's national baseball team. The battle is a draw with neither pitcher getting the decision, but the Marlins win 2–1.
- September 9 – In a game between the Montreal Expos and the San Diego Padres, umpires nearly allow 4 outs to be recorded in the 7th inning. Reggie Sanders of the Padres strikes out for the third out, but the umpires, the fans, and the Expos allow the Padres' Phil Nevin to come up to the plate and pitcher Ted Lilly to reach a 2-1 count before someone alerts home plate umpire Jerry Layne to the mistake. (Padres win 10–3)
- September 10 – The Red Sox trip the Yankees 3–1, as Pedro Martínez hurls an impressive one-hitter for his 21st victory of the year. Martinez strikes out 17 batters, the most Yankees ever fanned in a single game. Chili Davis' 2nd-inning home run is New York's only safety. Chuck Knoblauch, hit by pitch leading off the game, gives the Yankees their only other baserunner; he is caught stealing, so Martínez faces just one over the minimum.
- September 11 – The Twins defeat the Angels 7–0, as left-handed Eric Milton hurls the third no-hitter of the season.
- September 14:
  - Kansas City loses a doubleheader to the Angels, 8–6 in the opener and 6–5 in the nightcap. In the second game, KC outfielder Mark Quinn makes a memorable major league debut. After making out in his first at bat, Quinn doubles in his next trip to the plate, then hits home runs in his last two times up. He becomes just the third player in history to hit two home runs in his first big league game. Bob Nieman (1951) and Bert Campaneris (1964) are the only others to accomplish the feat.
  - Bernie Williams hits an eighth-inning grand slam off Toronto Blue Jay pitcher Billy Koch to tie the game and Paul O'Neill hits a ninth-inning slam off Paul Spoljaric to give the New York Yankees a 10–6 win over The Blue Jays.
- September 18:
  - The Brewers beat the Cubs, 7–4, as Sammy Sosa hits his 60th home run of the year. He becomes the first major leaguer to hit 60 homers twice.
  - Jim Morris of the Tampa Bay Devil Rays is called in to pitch relief against the Texas Rangers at The Ballpark in Arlington, striking out Royce Clayton. Just months earlier, Morris was a high school science teacher and baseball coach. His autobiography is the basis for the 2002 film The Rookie starring Dennis Quaid as Morris.
- September 21 – The Red Sox defeat the Blue Jays, 3–0, as Pedro Martínez fans 12 for his 22nd win. He joins Randy Johnson as the only pitchers to strike out at least 300 in both leagues, and breaks Roger Clemens' club mark of 291 strikeouts.
- September 26 – The Cardinals lose to the Reds 7–5, despite Mark McGwire's 60th home run of the season. McGwire joins Sammy Sosa as the only players in history to reach the 60 homer mark twice.
- September 27 – The Tigers defeat the Royals 8–2 in the final game ever played at Tiger Stadium.
- September 30 – The Los Angeles Dodgers defeat the San Francisco Giants 9–4, in the final baseball game ever played at Candlestick Park.

=== October ===
- October 2 – In a 3–2 Yankees victory over Tampa Bay, Bernie Williams draws his 100th walk of the season. He is the second player (after John Olerud in 1993) since Stan Musial (1949 and 1953) to reach 200 hits, 100 runs, 100 RBI and 100 walks in a season. Williams finishes with 202, 116, 115 and 100, respectively.
- October 3:
  - The Cardinals defeat the Cubs, 9–5, as both Mark McGwire and Sammy Sosa homer in their last game of the season. McGwire takes Steve Trachsel deep in the first inning and finishes with 65 home runs, with Sosa next in line with 63, homering in the third. McGwire's home run is his 522nd, moving him past Ted Williams and Willie McCovey for 10th place on the all-time list. He ends the season with 147 runs batted in on 145 hits, the only player in major league history (with 100 hits in a season) to have more RBI than hits. Jay Buhner, in 1995, comes closest with 121 RBI and 123 hits.
  - At the Astrodome, Jeff Bagwell of the Houston Astros becomes a two-time member of the 30–30 club. In the fifth inning of the Astros' 9–4 victory over the Los Angeles Dodgers, Bagwell, who has 42 home runs at this point, leads off with a base on balls, then steals second base for his 30th steal of the season. The only full-time first baseman to join the 30–30 club, Bagwell had also accomplished this feat in 1997.
- October 4 – The New York Mets defeat the Cincinnati Reds 5–0 in a one-game playoff to win the National League wild card berth. As is the custom with Major League Baseball tie-breaking playoff games, the tie-breaking game is included in the clubs' season won-loss record. Consequently, the Mets will finish the regular season with a 97–66 record and the Reds with a 96–67 record, one game more than the traditional 162-game regular-season schedule.
- October 9 – The Houston Astros play their last game at the historic Houston Astrodome as they prepare to move into Enron Field, located in downtown Houston, for the 2000 season. The Astros lose to the Atlanta Braves 7–5 as Atlanta advances to its 8th straight NLCS.
- October 17 – In the top of the 15th inning of the National League Championship Series' Game 5, the Atlanta Braves take a 3–2 lead over the New York Mets. The Mets later come back to tie the game at three. Robin Ventura hits a grand slam home run to win the game, but the hit is credited as a single after the on-field celebration prevented Ventura from advancing past first.
- October 22 – The New York Yankees sign minor league free agent Mike Coolbaugh. Though Coolbaugh never plays a game for the Yankees, he later becomes an unfortunate part of baseball history when he is killed during a minor league game when a line drive strikes him in the skull in 2007. After his death, coaches on the field began to wear helmets as a safety precaution.
- October 27 – The New York Yankees defeat the Atlanta Braves, 4–1, to win their 25th World Series. Roger Clemens gets the win, hurling 4-hit ball before leaving the game in the 8th inning. Mariano Rivera gets the save, his second of the Series. Jim Leyritz hits a solo home run in the 8th inning to finish the NY scoring. Rivera wins the Series MVP award.

=== November ===
- November 1:
  - The Cubs hire Atlanta Braves hitting coach Don Baylor as their new manager.
  - The Indians hire hitting coach Charlie Manuel as their new manager.
- November 17:
  - The Angels hire Mike Scioscia as their new manager.
  - Chipper Jones of the Atlanta Braves was named the National League Most Valuable Player.
- November 18 – Iván Rodríguez of the Texas Rangers was named the American League Most Valuable Player.
- November 26 – Arbitrator Alan Symonette rejects the owners' attempt to dismiss the umpires' grievance, giving the 22 booted umps a chance to get their jobs back. Symonette will hear the grievance beginning December 13.
- November 30 – Members of the umpires association vote 57–35 to form a new union, with one vote voided because a member signs his ballot. The NLRB certifies the election results in seven days, if there are no objections. But, Jerry Crawford, the president of the old union, says objections are likely to be filed.

=== December ===
- December 5 – Major League Baseball and ESPN agree to settle their lawsuit by signing a new 6-year, $800 million deal. The suit involves ESPN's decision to give National Football League games priority over late-season Sunday Night Baseball games on its main channel.

== Movies ==
- For Love of the Game

== Births ==
=== January ===
- January 2 – Fernando Tatís Jr.
- January 7 – Billy Cook
- January 7 – Shane Drohan
- January 16 – Andrés Muñoz
- January 21 – Matt Sauer
- January 22 – Trent Harris
- January 26 – Omar Cruz
- January 26 – Davis Schneider
- January 27 – Hyeseong Kim
- January 27 – Luis Ortiz
- January 29 – Ryan Loutos
- January 30 – Brailyn Márquez
- January 30 – Tyler Samaniego
- January 31 – Matt Svanson

=== February ===
- February 1 – Tyler Gentry
- February 3 – Chad Stevens
- February 7 – Kervin Castro
- February 10 – Bradley Hanner
- February 11 – Darren Baker
- February 11 – Ben Casparius
- February 11 – Jayvien Sandridge
- February 11 – Joey Wiemer
- February 12 – Heston Kjerstad
- February 13 – Gilberto Celestino
- February 14 – Logan VanWey
- February 15 – José López
- February 15 – Esteury Ruiz
- February 18 – Isaac Paredes
- February 18 – Ryan Vilade
- February 18 – Jordan Westburg
- February 19 – Carmen Mlodzinski
- February 22 – Kyle Nicolas
- February 22 – Ben Rice
- February 23 – Elvis Alvarado
- February 24 – MacKenzie Gore
- February 25 – Rafael Marchán
- February 27 – Jack Dreyer
- February 27 – Adrian Morejón

=== March ===
- March 1 – Oswaldo Cabrera
- March 1 – Casey Schmitt
- March 2 – Justin Foscue
- March 2 – Dom Hamel
- March 2 – Hayden Harris
- March 5 – Tanner Bibee
- March 8 – Cal Mitchell
- March 9 – Miguel Amaya
- March 10 – Jeff Criswell
- March 11 – Sherten Apostel
- March 11 – Ryan Gusto
- March 12 – Max Meyer
- March 12 – Braxton Roxby
- March 12 – Alika Williams
- March 16 – Vladimir Guerrero Jr.
- March 17 – Cameron Foster
- March 19 – Juan Morillo
- March 23 – Austin Martin
- March 24 – George Soriano
- March 29 – José Fermín

=== April ===
- April 1 – Jackson Rutledge
- April 2 – Christian Roa
- April 4 – Turner Hill
- April 5 – Bobby Miller
- April 7 – Tim Tawa
- April 8 – Jo Adell
- April 12 – Brett Kerry
- April 15 – Michael Mercado
- April 22 – Jackson Wolf
- April 24 – Lázaro Estrada
- April 26 – Héctor Yan
- April 30 – Edouard Julien
- April 30 – Canaan Smith-Njigba

=== May ===
- May 3 – Luis Medina
- May 3 – Jack Sinclair
- May 4 – Max Castillo
- May 4 – Andrés Chaparro
- May 4 – Zach McCambley
- May 8 – Brett Wisely
- May 9 – Cade Smith
- May 10 – César Prieto
- May 11 – Joey Loperfido
- May 15 – Luis Oviedo
- May 17 – Brayan Bello
- May 19 – Bryce Elder
- May 19 – Deivi García
- May 20 – J.T. Ginn
- May 21 – Rodolfo Castro
- May 21 – Tyler Freeman
- May 22 – Ezequiel Durán
- May 27 – Nick Gonzales
- May 29 – Patrick Bailey
- May 31 – Robert Gasser
- May 31 – Emerson Hancock

=== June ===
- June 1 – Andrew Abbott
- June 1 – Tyler Uberstine
- June 2 – Liam Hicks
- June 3 – Max Lazar
- June 3 – Erik Tolman
- June 4 – Aaron Sabato
- June 5 – Steward Berroa
- June 5 – Royce Lewis
- June 7 – Eduarniel Núñez
- June 11 – Blaze Alexander
- June 13 – Andrew Alvarez
- June 15 – Steven Cruz
- June 15 – Christian Scott
- June 16 – Will Warren
- June 17 – Shane Baz
- June 18 – Robby Ahlstrom
- June 18 – Bryce Teodosio
- June 20 – Anthony Seigler
- June 21 – Garrett Crochet
- June 24 – Wilyer Abreu
- June 24 – Slade Cecconi
- June 24 – Christopher Morel

=== July ===
- July 1 – Jair Camargo
- July 8 – Reid Detmers
- July 8 – Dustin Harris
- July 12 – Zach Brzykcy
- July 12 – Austin Wells
- July 14 – Cole Wilcox
- July 15 – Cole Henry
- July 16 – Jarred Kelenic
- July 16 – Michael Siani
- July 17 – Noah Cameron
- July 26 – Ji-hwan Bae
- July 26 – Gavin Williams
- July 27 – Jacob Young
- July 31 – Reese Olson

=== August ===
- August 5 – Wyatt Olds
- August 6 – Hunter Greene
- August 6 – Matt McLain
- August 6 – Beck Way
- August 8 – Mason Denaburg
- August 9 – Xavier Edwards
- August 9 – Yunior Tur
- August 9 – Owen White
- August 11 – Doug Nikhazy
- August 12 – Joe Perez
- August 14 – Joe Boyle
- August 14 – Sauryn Lao
- August 23 – Yovanny Cruz
- August 25 – Eguy Rosario
- August 26 – Spencer Torkelson
- August 28 – Gregory Santos
- August 30 – Hunter Dobbins
- August 30 – Christian Montes De Oca

=== September ===
- September 1 – Jordan Wicks
- September 3 – Tanner Murray
- September 5 – Randy Rodríguez
- September 7 – Heliot Ramos
- September 9 – Ben Brown
- September 9 – Otto Kemp
- September 10 – Pierson Ohl
- September 16 – Tucupita Marcano
- September 19 – Austin Peterson
- September 21 – Henry Davis
- September 21 – Kyler Fedko
- September 23 – Eliézer Alfonzo Jr.
- September 23 – Duncan Davitt
- September 27 – Adrian Del Castillo
- September 27 – Domingo González
- September 27 – Mitchell Parker
- September 27 – Ángel Zerpa
- September 30 – Sam Bachman
- September 30 – Shawn Ross

=== October ===
- October 5 – Braxton Ashcraft
- October 8 – Hunter Goodman
- October 8 – Connor Scott
- October 9 – Victor Vodnik
- October 10 – Luis Vázquez
- October 13 – Carlos Vargas
- October 15 – Yoendrys Gómez
- October 18 – Jordyn Adams
- October 19 – Zack Gelof
- October 22 – Geraldo Perdomo
- October 23 – Craig Yoho
- October 24 – Gage Workman
- October 26 – David Morgan
- October 26 – Luis Patiño
- October 27 – Francisco Morales
- October 30 – Wenceel Pérez

=== November ===
- November 1 – Mason Englert
- November 2 – Parker Meadows
- November 2 – Carter Stewart
- November 4 – Johnathan Rodríguez
- November 5 – Luke Murphy
- November 5 – Samy Natera Jr.
- November 6 – Matthew Liberatore
- November 7 – Roansy Contreras
- November 8 – Mike Burrows
- November 10 – Jordan Groshans
- November 12 – Addison Barger
- November 12 – Ky Bush
- November 13 – Brett Baty
- November 15 – Collin Price
- November 15 – Emmet Sheehan
- November 16 – Grayson Rodriguez
- November 17 – Miguel Vargas
- November 18 – Will Banfield
- November 21 – Brice Turang
- November 22 – Kumar Rocker
- November 23 – Jack Anderson
- November 25 – Cole Winn
- November 28 – Will Klein
- November 30 – Christian Franklin

=== December ===
- December 1 – Christian Encarnacion-Strand
- December 5 – Antoine Kelly
- December 7 – José Devers
- December 10 – Mason Black
- December 11 – Mark Vientos
- December 13 – Ryan Bliss
- December 15 – Garrett McDaniels
- December 15 – Drew Rom
- December 16 – Heriberto Hernández
- December 17 – Richard Fitts
- December 17 – Gunnar Hoglund
- December 17 – Ryan Weathers
- December 18 – Sean Burke
- December 18 – Joey Cantillo
- December 22 – Juan Burgos
- December 22 – Jaden Hill
- December 22 – Alan Roden
- December 26 – Jack Perkins

== Deaths ==
=== January ===
- January 1 – Len Dondero, 95, backup infielder for the St. Louis Browns in the 1929 season.
- January 6 – Jim Dunn, 67, pitcher for the 1952 Pittsburgh Pirates.
- January 9 – Buck Felder, 83, middle infielder for the Memphis Red Sox, Chicago American Giants and Birmingham Black Barons of the Negro American League in 1944–1945.
- January 11 – Jim Dyck, 76, left fielder and third baseman for the St. Louis Browns, Cleveland Indians, Baltimore Orioles and Cincinnati Reds between 1951 and 1956.
- January 15 – Oscar Georgy, 82, pitcher who appeared in just one game for the New York Giants in 1938.
- January 23 – Charles England, 77, pitcher for the 1946 Newark Eagles of the Negro National League.
- January 25 – Bob Hartsfield, 67, former minor-league infielder who spent 48 years in baseball, serving as an MLB scout and minor-league manager and as director of scouting of the San Francisco Giants, 1994–1997; brother of Roy Hartsfield.
- January 26 – Larry Loughlin, 57, pitcher for the 1967 Philadelphia Phillies.
- January 31 – Norm Zauchin, 69, who hit 27 home runs with 93 RBI in 130 games as a 1955 rookie for the Boston Red Sox, also leading the American League first basemen with a .995 fielding percentage, while hitting three home runs with one double and 10 RBI in a single game, and ending 3rd in AL Rookie of the Year voting behind Herb Score and Billy Klaus.

=== February ===
- February 1 – Paul Calvert, 81, Canadian pitcher for the Cleveland Indians, Washington Senators and Detroit Tigers over all or parts of seven seasons spanning 1942–1951.
- February 3 – Leo Schrall, 91, player and manager in the Minor Leagues, as well as a famed head coach at Bradley University.
- February 8 – Carl Sumner, 90, backup outfielder who played with the Boston Red Sox in 1928, becoming the youngest player to join the American League in that season at 19 years, 301 days of age.
- February 12 – Jimmy Dudley, 89, broadcaster for the Cleveland Indians from 1948 to 1967 and the voice of the Seattle Pilots during their only major-league season (1969); early in his career, called games for the Chicago Cubs and White Sox.
- February 20 – Buck Rogers, 86, pitcher who played for the Washington Senators in 1935.
- February 20 – Joe Rossi, 78, catcher who played for the Cincinnati Reds in 1952, serving as the primary backup for incumbent Andy Seminick.
- February 21 – George Gill, 90, pitcher who He played for the Detroit Tigers and St. Louis Browns in a span of three seasons from 1937 to 1939.
- February 21 – Vinegar Bend Mizell, 68, All-Star pitcher who won 90 games for the St. Louis Cardinals and Pittsburgh Pirates, and later served as a Congressman.
- February 22 – Howie Haak, 87, legendary scout who worked for the Brooklyn Dodgers, Pittsburgh Pirates and Houston Astros for 49 seasons (1945–1993); influential in Pirates' acquisition of Roberto Clemente in 1954, and known for his coverage of Latin America and the Caribbean.
- February 24 – Johnnie Wittig, 84, pitcher who played from 1938 through 1949 for the New York Giants and Boston Red Sox.
- February 25 – Earl Huckleberry, 88, pitcher for the Philadelphia Athletics in the 1935 season.
- February 28 – Kenny Robinson, 29, relief pitcher for the Toronto Blue Jays and Kansas City Royals in part of three seasons spanning 1995–1997, who was killed in a car accident while attending spring training camp with the Arizona Diamondbacks.

=== March ===
- March 3 – John Brown, 80, pitcher/outfielder for the Cleveland Buckeyes of the Negro American League between 1944 and 1948.
- March 6 – Ted Alexander, 86, pitcher who toiled in the Negro leagues, principally for the Kansas City Monarchs, between 1938 and 1948.
- March 8 – Joe DiMaggio, 84, Hall of Fame center fielder for the New York Yankees, who batted .325 lifetime, won three MVP awards (1939, 1941, 1947) and had a record 56-game hitting streak in 1941, while playing in 13 All-Star Games and nine World Series champion teams; collecting seven years of 30 home runs and nine with 100 RBI; leading AL in batting, slugging, home runs and RBI twice each; runs and triples once each, as his 361 HRs were 5th-most upon retirement and his .579 slugging average ranked sixth all-time.
- March 8 – William Wrigley Jr., 66, owner of the Chicago Cubs from 1977 to 1981, who later sold the team to the Tribune Company, ending 60 years of family operation.
- March 10 – Alta Little, 75, All-American Girls Professional Baseball League player.
- March 13 – Bill Peterman, 77, Philadelphia Phillies catcher who went 1-for-1 in his only appearance in the majors on September 28, 1958.
- March 20 – Paul Toth, 63, pitcher who played from 1962 through 1964 with the St. Louis Cardinals and Chicago Cubs.
- March 24 – Birdie Tebbetts, 86, All-Star catcher for the Detroit Tigers and Boston Red Sox noted for his outspokenness, who also managed three teams and was AP Manager of the Year with 1956 Cincinnati Redlegs; later, scouted for 28 years.
- March 25 – Cal Ripken Sr., 63, longtime coach and manager in the Baltimore Orioles system, and father of future Hall of Famer Cal Jr.; managed Orioles from 1987 through April 11, 1988.
- March 31 – Ike Kahdot, 99, third baseman for the 1922 Cleveland Indians, who at the time of his death was the oldest living former major league player.

=== April ===
- April 1 – Red Flaherty, 81, American League umpire from 1953 to 1973 who was chosen to work in four World Series and three All-Star Games over 21 seasons.
- April 4 – Early Wynn, 79, Hall of Fame pitcher for the Washington Senators, Cleveland Indians and Chicago White Sox, who won 300 games, top mark for the American League pitchers of his generation, as his 1959 Cy Young season was among five 20-win campaigns, while leading the league in innings three times, strikeouts twice and ERA once.
- April 6 – Gene Benson, 85, four-time Negro National League All-Star centerfielder who played primarily for the Philadelphia Stars between 1937 and 1948.
- April 9 – Clay Bryant, 87, pitcher who posted a 32–20 record with 3.73 ERA for the Chicago Cubs from 1931 to 1940, including 19 victories and a National League lead with 135 strikeouts in 1938; later a minor league manager and MLB coach for the Los Angeles Dodgers and Cleveland Indians.
- April 9 – Jerold Hoffberger, 80, chairman and principal owner of the Baltimore Orioles from 1965 to 1979, a period in which the Orioles won four American League pennants and two World Series titles, plus a fifth pennant just after he sold the team to Edward Bennett Williams before the 1980 season.
- April 11 – Pete Milne, 74, outfielder for the New York Giants between the 1948 and 1950 seasons.
- April 12 – Cliff Ross, 70, pitcher for the 1954 Cincinnati Redlegs.
- April 15 – Bernie Snyder, 85, middle infielder who played in 1935 with the Philadelphia Athletics.
- April 16 – Kaoru Betto, 78, Hall of Fame Japanese Baseball League and NPB outfielder and manager who played for the Osaka Tigers and Mainichi Orions from 1948 to 1957 and managed four teams.
- April 18 – Sam Barber, 79, pitcher for 1940 Birmingham Black Barons of the Negro American League.
- April 26 – Faye Throneberry, 67, valuable backup outfielder for the Boston Red Sox, Washington Senators and Los Angeles Angels in a span of eight seasons from 1952 to 1960; elder brother of Marv Throneberry.

=== May ===
- May 3 – Joe Adcock, 71, All-Star first baseman who played mainly for the Milwaukee Braves; twice hit 35 home runs, had four home runs and a double for 18 total bases in a 1954 game, and ruined Harvey Haddix's epic 1959 no-hit bid with a 13th-inning homer (eventually ruled a double); member of 1957 World Series champions and 1958 NL champs; manager of 1967 Cleveland Indians.
- May 5 – Will Owens, 97, shortstop whose Black baseball career included service on ten clubs in four different leagues between 1923 and 1933.
- May 10 – Carl Powis, 71, right fielder for the 1957 Baltimore Orioles.
- May 11 – Ben Taylor, 71, first baseman who played for the St. Louis Browns, Detroit Tigers and Milwaukee Braves in a span of three seasons from 1951 to 1955.
- May 30 – Clarence Heise, 91, pitcher who appeared in just one game for the St. Louis Cardinals during the 1934 season.

=== June ===
- June 3 – Charlene Pryer, 77, All-American Girls Professional League All-Star infielder who set several records in a seven-season career and also served during World War II.
- June 6 – Eddie Stanky, 82, All-Star second baseman for five National League teams (1943–1953), who led the league in walks three times and runs once; managed the St. Louis Cardinals (1952–1955), Chicago White Sox (1966–1968) and Texas Rangers (one game in 1977); longtime head baseball coach of the University of South Alabama.
- June 7 – Bob Garber, 70, pitcher for the 1956 Pittsburgh Pirates.
- June 15 – Gene Markland, 79, second baseman who played for the Philadelphia Athletics in 1950, whose baseball career was interrupted by four years of wartime service in the armed forces.
- June 23 – Bert Haas, 85, All-Star first baseman who played with five National League during nine seasons from 1937 to 1951, most prominently for the Cincinnati Reds between 1942 and 1947, and later managed in the Minor Leagues from 1955 to 1961.
- June 24 – Takehiko Bessho, 76, Hall of Fame pitcher and manager that played for the Nankai/Great Ring/Nankai Hawks and the Yomiuri Giants from 1942 to 1960 and managed the Sankei Atoms/Atoms/Yakult Atoms for three season from 1968 to 1970.
- June 25 – Charlie English, 89, third baseman who played for the Chicago White Sox, New York Giants and Cincinnati Reds in all or part of four seasons spanning 1932–1937.
- June 26 – Tim Layana, 35, pitcher who played for the Cincinnati Reds and San Francisco Giants in three seasons from 1990 to 1993, as well as a member of the 1990 World Series Champion Reds team.

=== July ===
- July 8 – José Antonio Casanova, 80, the most successful manager in Venezuelan baseball history, who won five Venezuelan league titles and led his teams to several international titles in a career that spanned more than three decades.
- July 11 – Henry Kimbro, 87, seven-time All-Star outfielder for the Washington (1937) and Baltimore (1938–1948) Elite Giants of the Negro National League.
- July 13 – Irene Ruhnke, 79, infielder and outfielder who played in the All-American Girls Professional Baseball League from 1943 through 1947.
- July 16 – Whit Wyatt, 91, four-time All-Star pitcher best known for winning 22 in games in 1941 to lead the Brooklyn Dodgers to the National League pennant, before winning the only game against the New York Yankees in the 1941 World Series; longtime pitching coach.
- July 18 – Woody Davis, 86, pitcher who played in two games for the Detroit Tigers in 1938.
- July 28 – Ed Cole, 90, pitcher who played for the St. Louis Browns in the 1938 and 1939 seasons.

=== August ===
- August 4 – Leo Sanders, 85, shortstop who played for the Memphis Red Sox and four other Negro American League teams between 1937 and 1942.
- August 8 – Harry Walker, 80, "Harry the Hat", two-time NL All-Star center fielder; appeared in 807 games for four clubs, including the St. Louis Cardinals and Philadelphia Phillies, between 1940 and 1955 and a member of 1942 and 1946 world champion Cardinals; won 1947 National League batting title; later managed for 20 years, including nine seasons in MLB with Cardinals, Pittsburgh Pirates and Houston Astros, and a longtime coach.
- August 12 – Josh Johnson, 85, catcher who appeared in Black baseball and Negro leagues—for Homestead Grays and New York Black Yankees—between 1935 and 1940.
- August 14 – Evelyn Adams, 75, All-American Girls Professional Baseball League shortstop.
- August 14 – Pat Mullin, 81, two-time All-Star outfielder for the Detroit Tigers in 10 seasons between 1940 and 1953; a member of the 1940 American League champions Tigers; coach for Detroit (1963–1966), Cleveland Indians (1967) and Montreal Expos (1979–1981).
- August 14 – Pee Wee Reese, 81, Hall of Fame shortstop and leadoff hitter and captain of the Brooklyn/Los Angeles Dodgers in 16 seasons (1940–1942, 1946–1958); ten-time All-Star who played on seven National League pennant winners and 1955 World Series champions, three times batting over .300 in the series; led NL in runs, walks and steals once each and in putouts four times, before retiring with MLB career-record for double plays (1,246) and fifth-most games at shortstop (2,014), despite missing three years during World War II; after his playing career, won another ring as a coach for 1959 champion Dodgers, then became a longtime broadcaster for MLB Game of the Week.
- August 15 – Greek George, 86, backup catcher who played for the Cleveland Indians, Brooklyn Dodgers, Chicago Cubs and Philadelphia Athletics in a span of five seasons from 1935 to 1945.
- August 17 – Randy Heflin, 80, pitcher for the Boston Red Sox in the early 1940s.
- August 18 – Albert Frazier, 84, second- and third baseman for the Jacksonville Red Caps and Cleveland Bears of the Negro American League from 1938 to 1940 who later became baseball and football coach at Savannah State University.
- August 19 – Dee Fondy, 84, first baseman for the Pittsburgh Pirates, Cincinnati Reds and Chicago Cubs from 1951 to 1958, who was the last MLB player to bat in final game at Ebbets Field; later a longtime scout.
- August 21 – Nap Gulley, 74, good-hitting, run-producing outfielder who appeared in Negro leagues (1943 Newark Eagles, 1947 Cleveland Buckeyes), Mexican League and independent circuits (1948–1949), and "Organized Baseball" (1950–1956).
- August 24 – Fran Matthews, 82, first baseman for the Newark Eagles of the Negro National League between 1938 and 1945 who joined the U.S. Army at age 33 in 1950, served through 1972, and became a decorated Vietnam War veteran.
- August 24 – Lonnie Summers, 84, infielder/outfielder who played for the 1938 Baltimore Elite Giants of the Negro leagues, independent Mexican League clubs, and Organized Baseball's minor leagues through 1956.
- August 28 – Johnny Gerlach, 82, shortstop for the Chicago White Sox in the 1938 and 1939 seasons.
- August 28 – Dave Pope, 78, All-Star outfielder in the Negro leagues, later a big leaguer with the Cleveland Indians and Baltimore Orioles during four seasons spanning 1952–1956.
- August 30 – Warren Huston, 85, infield utility man for the 1937 Philadelphia Athletics and the 1944 Boston Braves.

=== September ===
- September 1 – Doc Marshall, 93, backup infielder who played from 1929 through 1932 for the New York Giants.
- September 1 – Boots Poffenberger, 84, pitcher for the Detroit Tigers and Brooklyn Dodgers during four seasons from 1937 to 1939.
- September 4 – Erma Keyes, 73, All-American Girls Professional Baseball League player.
- September 9 – Jim "Catfish" Hunter, 53, Hall of Fame pitcher who posted five straight 20-win seasons for the Oakland Athletics and New York Yankees, winning the Cy Young Award in 1974 while totaling over 200 wins at age 30, a perfect game in 1968, as well as a 4–0 record with a 2.19 ERA in three World Series with the Athletics.
- September 13 – Bill Lohrman, 86, pitcher for five different National League clubs from 1934 through 1944, most prominently with the New York Giants between the 1937 and 1943 seasons.
- September 16 – Doug Hansen, 70, who appeared in three games as a pinch runner for the Cleveland Indians in 1951.
- September 16 – Paul Gregory, 91, pitcher who played with the Chicago White Sox in 1932 and 1933, and later became a successful coach at Mississippi State University.
- September 16 – Ace Williams, 82, pitcher who played for the Boston Bees in 1940 and the Boston Braves in 1946.
- September 28 – Edwin Dimes, 95, outfielder for three Ohio-based Negro leagues clubs: the 1926 Dayton Monarchs, 1933 Akron Greys and 1940 Cleveland Bears.
- September 29 – Arnold Earley, 66, southpaw reliever who pitched from 1960 through 1967 for the Boston Red Sox, Chicago Cubs and Houston Astros.
- September 30 – Nels Potter, 79, pitcher for the St. Louis Cardinals, Philadelphia Athletics, Boston Red Sox, St. Louis Browns and Boston Braves from 1936 to 1949, who posted a 19–7 record with a 2.83 ERA in 1944 to lead the Browns to their only American League title.

=== October ===
- October 2 – Frank Duncan, 79, pitcher/first baseman for the 1941 Kansas City Monarchs of Negro American League) and 1945 Baltimore Elite Giants of the Negro National League.
- October 3 – Paul Burris, 76, catcher who appeared in 69 games for the Boston Braves and Milwaukee Braves in a span of four seasons from 1948 to 1953.
- October 6 – Bob Patrick, 81, outfielder who played for the Detroit Tigers in the 1941 and 1942 seasons.
- October 9 – Dutch Dotterer, 67, catcher who played for the Cincinnati Redlegs/Reds from 1957 to 1960, and the expansion Washington Senators in 1961.
- October 13 – Tex Aulds, 78, backup catcher who played in three games for the Boston Red Sox in the 1947 season.
- October 15 – Leonard Johnson, 79, pitcher for the 1947 Kansas City Monarchs and 1948 Chicago American Giants of the Negro American League.
- October 19 – Ray Katt, 72, catcher for the New York Giants and St. Louis Cardinals from 1952 to 1959, later head baseball coach at Texas Lutheran University for 22 years.
- October 20 – Calvin Griffith, 87, succeeded uncle Clark Griffith as majority owner, president and de facto general manager of the Washington Senators and their successor, the Minnesota Twins, serving from October 27, 1955, to August 15, 1984; responsible for moving the Senators to Minnesota after the 1960 season.
- October 20 – Earl Turner, 76, catcher for the Pittsburgh Pirates between 1948 and 1950.
- October 30 – Max Patkin, 79, former minor league pitcher who succeeded Al Schacht as the "Clown Prince of Baseball" and entertained fans for over 50 years; hired by Bill Veeck as a St. Louis Browns coach in early 1950s and featured in 1988 film Bull Durham.

=== November ===
- November 1 – Pat McLaughlin, 89, pitcher who played for the Detroit Tigers, Philadelphia Athletics and Detroit Tigers in part of three seasons between 1937 and 1945.
- November 8 – Coley Logan, 87, shortstop for the 1940 Philadelphia Stars of the Negro National League.
- November 13 – Ray Goolsby, 80, outfielder who played in three games for the 1946 Washington Senators.
- November 16 – Allen Benson, 94, pitcher for the Washington Senators during the 1934 season.
- November 18 – Jay Heard, 79, southpaw who pitched in both Negro leagues and Organized Baseball between 1946 and 1957; appeared in two games for the 1954 Baltimore Orioles.
- November 25 – Twila Shively, 79, All-American Girls Professional Baseball League outfielder from 1945 through 1950.
- November 28 – Dick Errickson, 87, pitcher who played from 1938 through 1942 for the Boston Bees, Boston Braves and Chicago Cubs.
- November 29 – Tom Herrin, 70, who pitched for the 1954 Boston Red Sox.
- November 30 – Al Schroll, 67, pitcher for the Boston Red Sox, Philadelphia Phillies, Chicago Cubs and Minnesota Twins from 1958 to 1961.

=== December ===
- December 1 – Gene Baker, 74, shortstop for 1948 Kansas City Monarchs, then second baseman for the Chicago Cubs and Pittsburgh Pirates during eight National League seasons between 1953 and 1961; 1955 NL All-Star; upon June 1961 playing retirement, became first black manager in Organized Baseball as skipper of Batavia Pirates of New York–Penn League; coached on Pittsburgh's MLB staff in 1963, then became longtime Pirates' scout.
- December 2 – Mike Budnick, 80, pitcher who appeared in 42 games for the New York Giants in the 1946 and 1947 seasons.
- December 3 – Curtis Brown, 76, first baseman for the 1947 New York Black Yankees.
- December 5 – Freddie Shepard, 83, outfielder who appeared for the Atlanta Black Crackers, Baltimore Elite Giants, Birmingham Black Barons and Chicago American Giants between 1943 and 1948.
- December 6 – Roy Talcott, 79, pitcher who played for the 1943 Boston Braves.
- December 8 – Wally Hebert, 92, pitcher who played from 1931 through 1933 with the St. Louis Browns and for the Pittsburgh Pirates in 1943.
- December 9 – Whitey Kurowski, 81, five-time All-Star third baseman and three-time World Series champion for the 1941–1949 St. Louis Cardinals.
- December 15 – Eddie Kazak, 79, All-Star third baseman who played from 1948 through 1952 for the St. Louis Cardinals and Cincinnati Reds.
- December 17 – Rufus Lewis, 80, two-time All-Star pitcher for the 1946–1948 Newark Eagles of the Negro National League; also hurled in Cuban, Mexican and Venezuelan leagues.
- December 20 – Dick Bertell, 64, backup catcher who played for the Chicago Cubs and San Francisco Giants in seven seasons between 1960 and 1967.
- December 29 – Fred Saigh, 94, co-owner (1947–1949) and sole owner (1949–1953) of the St. Louis Cardinals; forced to sell the Redbirds after he pleaded no-contest to tax evasion charges, he kept the team in St. Louis by accepting the lower bid of August A. Busch Jr., who would own it until 1989.
- December 31 – Larry Bearnarth, 58, relief pitcher for the New York Mets from 1963 to 1966, later a pitching coach for the Montreal Expos and Colorado Rockies.
- December 31 – Harry Kimberlin, 90, pitcher who played from 1936 to 1939 with the St. Louis Browns.
