= Lawrence Kramer =

Lawrence or Larry Kramer may refer to:

- Lawrence Francis Kramer (born 1933), American politician, two-time mayor of Paterson, New Jersey
- Larry Kramer (1935–2020), American playwright, author, public health advocate, and LGBT rights activist
- Larry Kramer (American football) (1942–2014), American college football player and coach
- Lawrence Kramer (musicologist) (born 1946), American academic and musicologist
- Larry Kramer (legal scholar) (born 1958), American lawyer and academic, dean of Stanford Law School
- Larry S. Kramer (born 1950), American journalist, entrepreneur

== See also ==
- Lawrence William Cramer (1897–1978), civilian governor of the United States Virgin Islands
