= Royal Giants =

The Royal Giants is the name of three different baseball teams:

- Boston Royal Giants
- Brooklyn Royal Giants
- Kansas City Royal Giants
