= You're in the Super Bowl, Charlie Brown =

1994 animated television special

- Genre: Animated television special
- Based on: Peanuts by Charles M. Schulz
- Written by: Charles M. Schulz
- Directed by: Bill Melendez
- Voices of: Jimmy Guardino; John Christian Graas; Molly Dunham; Haley Peel; Nicole Fisher; Crystal Kuns; Bill Melendez; Steve Stoliar
- Music by: Vince Guaraldi
- Opening theme: "Charlie Brown Theme"
- Ending theme: "Charlie Brown Theme"
- Country of origin: United States
- Original language: English

Production
- Executive producer: Lee Mendelson
- Producer: Bill Melendez
- Editors: Chuck McCann; Warren Taylor
- Running time: 24 minutes
- Production companies: Lee Mendelson Film Productions; Bill Melendez Productions

Original release
- Network: NBC
- Release: January 18, 1994

Related
- It's Christmastime Again, Charlie Brown (1992); It Was My Best Birthday Ever, Charlie Brown (1997)

You're in the Super Bowl, Charlie Brown is the 37th prime-time animated television special based on Charles M. Schulz's comic strip Peanuts. It premiered on January 18, 1994, on NBC. It was the last new Peanuts special to air on television until A Charlie Brown Valentine in 2002, and the last before Schulz's death in 2000.

You're in the Super Bowl, Charlie Brown is notable for being the only Peanuts television special to debut on NBC; from 1965 to 2000, most Peanuts specials were aired by CBS. NBC aired this special as a tie-in with Super Bowl XXVIII, to which NBC held the rights that year; it was produced with the full cooperation of the National Football League, whose team uniforms are featured pervasively in the special.

== Plot ==
As Lucy prepares to pull her usual trick of pulling the ball away from Charlie Brown as he tries to kick it, Peppermint Patty, Marcie, Franklin, and Linus arrive. They inform Lucy and Charlie Brown that there will be a Punt, Pass, and Kick contest. They mention that first prize wins a new bicycle and a trip to the Super Bowl, and suggest they all enter. As they discuss the contest, Charlie Brown seeks his chance to kick the ball while Lucy is not looking—only for Lucy to blindly pull it away in perfect timing.

While Charlie Brown and Linus are practicing for the contest, they notice a very pretty girl, who catches Linus' attention. They walk up to her and introduce themselves. The girl says her name is Melody, and she has been watching them. They flirt with her and take her out for hot fudge sundaes. They then try to impress her and tell her they will be entering the punt-and-pass contest. Melody says she will be rooting for them at the contest.

At the punt-and-pass contest, Charlie Brown and Linus see Melody watching them, and they argue about who Melody came to watch. The announcer announces every player, and every player gets a better score than the next one, except for Marcie who refuses to kick the football thinking the football did nothing to deserve being kicked. Charlie Brown performs well, finishing his turn in first place, only for Linus to best him. To the dismay of both, Melody turns out to be the final contestant, whose score beats all of the others. Betrayed, Linus admits to Charlie Brown that he is in love with her. Melody wins the new bicycle and the tickets to the Super Bowl.

Later, Charlie Brown and Linus are at the wall. Linus is so upset that the girl he was in love with beat him that he says he will never trust anyone again. Charlie Brown replies "Your sister says we can't go through life doubting everyone. We have to learn to trust each other" (echoing her bait line at the beginning of the special before pulling the football away from him). Lucy then comes to them holding a football, much to Charlie Brown's despondence and annoyance.

Meanwhile, Snoopy coaches The Birds (a football team in Philadelphia Eagles attire consisting of Woodstock and his avian friends), as they compete in the Animal Football League playoffs. In the Eastern final against the Cats (loosely based on the Detroit Lions), Woodstock and his team manage to beat the Cats 38–0. In the league semifinal, the Birds crush the Dogs 58–0. In the World Championship, The Birds take on The Bison (a parody of the Buffalo Bills). As the game begins, Lucy comes onto the field and tells Snoopy he is a horrible coach, and his team will get crushed. But once again, The Birds crush the other team, 62–0 (again parodying Bills assistant coach Chuck Dickerson's disparaging the Washington Redskins prior to Super Bowl XXVI), winning the championship. After each touchdown, the Birds introduce a different celebration dance, and after each win, they douse Snoopy in Chirpade—except for the championship, when Lucy is on the receiving end of the Chirpade shower.

== Cast ==
- Jimmy Guardino as Charlie Brown
- John Christian Graas as Linus Van Pelt and Kid who yells
- Molly Dunham as Lucy Van Pelt
- Haley Peel as Peppermint Patty
- Nicole Fisher as Marcie
- Steve Stoliar as Announcer
- Crystal Kuns as Melody-Melody
- Bill Melendez as Snoopy and Woodstock

== NFL uniforms worn ==
- Miss "Lucille" Van Pelt – Los Angeles Raiders
- Mr. Franklin Armstrong – Houston Oilers
- Miss Patricia Richardt – Denver Broncos
- Mr. Pig-Pen – Green Bay Packers
- Miss Marcie Johnson – Washington Redskins
- Mr. Charles Brown – San Francisco 49ers
- Mr. Linus van Pelt – Los Angeles Rams
- Miss Melody-Melody – Dallas Cowboys
- Birds – Philadelphia Eagles
- Cats – Detroit Lions
- Dogs – Cleveland Browns
- Bison – Buffalo Bills

== Production notes ==
This special was animated by Wang Film Productions in Taiwan. It was the third and final Peanuts special to be animated by them.

Franklin and Marcie, whose last names were never officially revealed during the course of the Peanuts comic strip, were given surnames for the first time in this special. Franklin's last name—Armstrong—was a homage to cartoonist Robb Armstrong, whose comic strip Jump Start was among the first broad-appeal comic strips to focus on a black family; Schulz called Armstrong to ask permission to use his name for the special, and Armstrong (who considered Schulz one of his biggest influences) consented without hesitation. Marcie was given the surname of Johnson.

=== Music score ===
As with the preceding It's Christmastime Again, Charlie Brown, jazz pianist David Benoit performed and arranged the music score consisting of variations of songs originally performed by jazz pianist Vince Guaraldi. Guaraldi composed music scores for the first 16 Peanuts television specials and one feature film (A Boy Named Charlie Brown) before his death in February 1976.

All songs written by Vince Guaraldi, except where noted.

1. "Charlie Brown Theme" (Vince Guaraldi, Lee Mendelson)
2. "Pebble Beach"
3. "Peppermint Patty"
4. "Air Music"
5. "Charlie Brown Theme" (reprise) (Vince Guaraldi, Lee Mendelson)
6. "Air Music" (reprise)
7. "Charlie Brown and His All-Stars"
8. "Air Music" (second reprise)
9. "Charlie Brown Theme" (second reprise) (Vince Guaraldi, Lee Mendelson)
10. "Linus and Lucy"
11. "Charlie Brown Theme" (end credits) (Vince Guaraldi, Lee Mendelson)

== Releases ==
=== Television ===
You're in the Super Bowl, Charlie Brown first aired on January 18, 1994, and was the only animated Peanuts special to air on NBC, which had the rights to air the Super Bowl in 1994. (All previous Peanuts specials had aired on CBS, starting with the 1965 premiere of A Charlie Brown Christmas.) The special received an 8.0 rating and was watched by about 7.5 million households.

You're in the Super Bowl, Charlie Brown was the last Peanuts special to air on television before Charles Schulz's death in 2000. (Two more specials were produced, but they were released direct-to-video.) The next new special that aired on television was A Charlie Brown Valentine, which premiered on ABC in 2002. It was also the last Peanuts special produced using traditional cel animation.

=== Home media ===
You're in the Super Bowl, Charlie Brown is the only Peanuts special that Paramount Home Entertainment or Warner Home Video, the last two holders of the Peanuts home media rights, do not have the distribution rights to. It was available on VHS format at participating Shell gas stations, and has never been released on DVD and Blu-ray as well as streaming (including Apple TV).
