= Boston Royal Giants =

American professional baseball team

The Boston Royal Giants were a Negro league baseball team in Boston. The team was also known as the Boston Giants, Quaker Giants, Philadelphia Giants and Boston Colored Giants. The Royal Giants served as a farm team of sorts for the league. They played as far north as Canada's Cape Breton League, and games against mill or industrial teams in Maine, Vermont and New Hampshire.

== History of the team ==
Black baseball in Boston started in the 1870s when the City League formed teams of men. Though the Boston Giants were never among the most nationally popular black semi-pro teams, Boston was a hotbed of black baseball in the 1930s and 1940s.

In 1923, Negro league veteran Danny McClellan organized a team that had been playing as the Quaker Giants into a Boston-based contingent called, for marketing purposes, the Philadelphia Giants. Black sports teams often named themselves after cities that would immediately identify them as African American to white fans and media (such as the Harlem Globetrotters, who were founded in Chicago).

The Boston Royal Giants sometimes played in famed Boston Park League. Venues that hosted the Giants were often small public parks such as Medford's Playstead Park and Boston's Lincoln Park, but Braves Field (now Boston University's Nickerson Field) rented to African American owners as early as 1938, and Fenway Park was used for heavily-promoted games after 1942.

On July 13, 2002, the Boston Red Sox dressed in 1948 Boston Royal Giants uniforms to honor the Negro league.

== Significant players ==
Players included Texan sidearm pitcher Will "Cannonball" Jackman and catcher Burlin White. Over the 1920s Giants came and went, and the team adopted the names Boston (Colored) Giants and Boston Royal Giants, but Jackman and White were mainstays. Jackman threw a blazing fastball that dropped as it approached the plate — legendary New York Giants manager John McGraw coveted him so that he called Jackman a great pitcher and hitter who would help bring a pennant to any major league team, but for his complexion. Negro league superstar Bill Yancey, later a New York Yankees scout, said Jackman was the greatest all-around ballplayer he ever saw. According to James A. Riley's "Biographical Encyclopedia of the Negro Leagues," Jackman was "52-2 one season with the Giants and bested Satchel Paige twice in two outings."

Longtime Negro league pitcher Pud Flournoy pitched for the team when he was past his prime, and centerfielder Gene Benson told a Black baseball author the Royal Giants left him stranded in Michigan during a road trip. Newark Eagles first baseman Frannie Matthews, from Cambridge, Massachusetts, also saw time with the RG's.

== Known players ==
- Gene Benson
- Willis Flournoy
- William "Cannonball" Jackman
- Fran Matthews
- Burlin White
