= 1999 Big League World Series =

Tournament details
- Country: United States
- City: Tucson, Arizona
- Dates: 8–14 August 1999
- Teams: 9

Final positions
- Champions: Orlando, Florida
- Runners-up: Fraser Valley, Canada

The 1999 Big League World Series took place from August 8–14 in Tucson, Arizona, United States. Orlando, Florida defeated Fraser Valley, Canada in the championship game.

This was the first BLWS held in Tucson; it also featured the debut of round-robin pool play.

== Teams ==
United States	International
(Arizona) Tucson, Arizona; District 5 Host	Fraser Valley, British Columbia, Canada; Fraser Valley; Canada
(Illinois) Oak Lawn, Illinois; District 15; Central	Kaunas, Lithuania Europe
(Delaware) Dover, Delaware; District 1 East	(Northern Mariana Islands) Saipan, Northern Mariana Islands; Saipan; Far East
(Florida) Orlando, Florida; District 14; South	Puerto Rico Latin America
(Hawaii) Aiea, Hawaii; District 6 West	

== Results ==
United States Pool

Team	W	L	Rs	Ra
Florida	4	0	35	20
Hawaii	3	1	33	24
Illinois	1	3	34	28
Delaware	1	3	13	32
Arizona	1	3	24	35

	(Arizona)	(Delaware)	(Florida)	(Hawaii)	(Illinois)
Arizona	–	7–8	3–8	5–11	9–8
Delaware	8–7	–	1–6	2–6	2–13
Florida	8–3	6–1	–	11–9	10–7
Hawaii	11–5	6–2	9–11	–	7–6
Illinois	8–9	13–2	7–10	6–7	–

International Pool

Team	W	L	Rs	Ra
Canada	3	0	42	12
Puerto Rico	2	1	47	11
Northern Mariana Islands	1	2	24	45
Lithuania	0	3	4	49

	(Canada)	(Lithuania)	(Northern Mariana Islands)	(Puerto Rico)
Canada	–	18–0	16–6	8–6
Lithuania	0–18	–	1–18	3–13
Northern Mariana Islands	6–16	18–1	–	0–28
Puerto Rico	6–8	13–3	28–0	–

Elimination Round

Semifinals
4–0	Florida	13
3–1	Hawaii	12
3–0	Canada	6
2–1	Puerto Rico	1

World Championship
5–0	Florida	14
4–0	Canada	2

1999 Big League World Series Champions
District 14
Orlando, Florida
