= Burlin White =

American baseball player and manager (1895-1971)

- Catcher / Manager
- Born: February 5, 1895; Richmond, Virginia, U.S.
- Died: April 5, 1971 (aged 76); Bedford, Massachusetts, U.S.
- Batted: Both Threw: Right

Negro league baseball debut
- 1915, for the West Baden Sprudels

Last appearance
- 1933, for the Pollock's Cuban Stars

Teams
- West Baden Sprudels (1915); Chicago American Giants (1916–1917); Atlantic City Bacharach Giants (1917, 1923); Philadelphia Hilldale Club (1919); Madison Stars (1920); New York Lincoln Giants (1920–1921, 1925); Harrisburg Giants (1923); Philadelphia Giants (1925–1928); Wilmington Giants (1930); Pollock's Cuban Stars (1933)

Burlin White (February 5, 1895 – April 5, 1971) was an American professional baseball catcher and manager in the Negro leagues. He played from 1915 to 1933 with several teams. He later managed the Philadelphia Giants/Boston Royal Giants.
