= 1999 Junior League World Series =

Tournament information
- Location: Taylor, Michigan
- Dates: August 16–21

Final positions
- Champions: Arroyo, Puerto Rico
- Runner-up: Hermosillo, Mexico

The 1999 Junior League World Series took place from August 16–21 in Taylor, Michigan, United States. Arroyo, Puerto Rico defeated Hermosillo, Mexico in the championship game.

This year featured the debut of the Far East region.

== Teams ==
United States	International
Fort Wayne, Indiana; St Joe Central; Central	Coquitlam, British Columbia; Coquitlam; Canada
Meriden, Connecticut; Ed Walsh; East	Ramstein, Germany; KMC; Europe
Lake Charles, Louisiana; South Lake Charles; South	Hagåtña, Guam Far East
La Verne, California; La Verne; West	Hermosillo, Sonora Mexico
	Arroyo, Puerto Rico; Arroyo; Puerto Rico

== Results ==
Winner's Bracket

Opening Game
—	Connecticut	6
—	California	5

—
1–0	Connecticut	5
—	Puerto Rico	6
—	Louisiana	1
—	Indiana	3
—	Canada	3
—	Mexico	5
—	Germany	3
—	Guam	5

—
1–0	Puerto Rico	9
1–0	Indiana	4
1–0	Mexico	3
1–0	Guam	1

Bracket Final
2–0	Puerto Rico	2
2–0	Mexico	0

Loser's Bracket

—
1
8
0–1	California	11
7
3
0–1	Canada	12
4
5

—
1–1	Connecticut	1
0–1	Louisiana	4
0–1	Germany	2
1–1	Canada	3

—
1–1	Guam	1
1–1	Louisiana	13
1–1	Indiana	3
2–1	Canada	4

Bracket Semifinal
2–1	Louisiana	14
3–1	Canada	4

Elimination Round

Semifinals
2–0	Puerto Rico	2
2–0	Mexico	0
2–1	Mexico	5
3–1	Louisiana	4

World Championship
3–0	Puerto Rico	1
3–1	Mexico	0

1999 Junior League World Series Champions
Arroyo LL
Arroyo, Puerto Rico
