= Gene Benson =

American baseball player

- Center fielder
- Born: October 2, 1913; Pittsburgh, Pennsylvania
- Died: April 6, 1999 (aged 85); Philadelphia, Pennsylvania
- Batted: Left Threw: Left

Negro leagues debut
- 1937, for the Philadelphia Stars

Last appearance
- 1948, for the Philadelphia Stars
- Stats at Baseball Reference

Teams
- Philadelphia Stars (1937); Homestead Grays (1938); Philadelphia Stars (1939–1948); Almendares (Cuban League) (1947)

Career highlights and awards
- 3× Negro League All-Star (1940, 1945, 1946)

Eugene Benson (October 2, 1913 – April 6, 1999) was an American center fielder in baseball's Negro leagues. He played for the Philadelphia Stars in 1937, moved to the Homestead Grays in 1938, and returned to the Stars from 1939 to 1948. He stood 5-foot-8 and weighed 185 pounds at the peak of his career.

== Playing career ==
At age 19, Benson joined Louis Santop's Philadelphia semi-pro team, Santop's Bronchos, for which he played first-base in the 1932 season. He tried out for and signed with the Brooklyn Royal Giants. Veteran Highpockets Hudspeth played first for the Royal Giants and Benson played in left field. In 1934, Benson signed with the Boston Royal Giants.

== Contemporary honors ==
The Wilmington Blue Rocks have hosted a "Judy Johnson Night – A Tribute to Negro League Baseball" since 1996 in which the team, the City of Wilmington, and the Judy Johnson Memorial Foundation honor a Negro leagues player. The Blue Rocks honored Benson in 1998.

The Marian Anderson Recreation Center at 17th and Fitzwater Streets in Philadelphia, near Marian Anderson's birthplace, has a baseball field called "Anderson Yards". Benson was invited to throw out the first pitch on opening day of the 1998 little league season at the field. The league "retired" and placed on the outfield wall, Jackie Robinson's number 42 and Benson's number 16.

In 2003, baseball historian Bill James identified Benson as the top Negro league player of the 1944 season.

On February 26, 2024, the Jump Start (comic strip) revealed that Benson was strip creator Robb Armstrong's great uncle. The Peanuts character, Franklin Armstrong (who Charles Schultz added the last name after Robb Armstrong in 1994) in the February 16, 2024 Apple TV Animated Special Snoopy Presents: Welcome Home, Franklin, Franklin shares that his great uncle was Eugene (Gene) Benson, the Negro League baseball player.
