= Fran Matthews =

Negro league baseball player

- First baseman
- Born: November 2, 1916; Cambridge, Massachusetts, U.S.
- Died: August 24, 1999 (aged 82); Los Angeles, California, U.S.
- Batted: Left Threw: Left

Negro league baseball debut
- 1934, for the Philadelphia Giants

Last appearance
- 1949, for the Boston Royal Giants

Teams
- Philadelphia Giants (1934–1935); Boston Royal Giants (1935–1937, 1942, 1946–1949); Newark Eagles (1938, 1940–1942, 1945); Kansas City Monarchs (1943); Philadelphia Stars (1945)

Francis Oliver Matthews (November 2, 1916 – August 24, 1999) was an American professional baseball first baseman in the Negro leagues. Matthews, whose father was from Barbados, was born and raised in Cambridge, Massachusetts, where he attended the prestigious Rindge Technical School. By the time he graduated in 1935, Matthews ability as one of the best baseball players in the Greater Boston area led to him being recognized as the first black captain of the Rindge Baseball team.

From 1935 to 1946, Matthews played with several Negro league teams, mostly the Boston Royal Giants and the Newark Eagles and one game with the Kansas City Monarchs at Fenway Park in 1943. The wear of travel and the low salaries of the Negro leagues got to Matthews forcing him to decide to return to Boston in 1942 to work at the Watertown Arsenal. He never left baseball though. Matthews starred as one of three black players on the Watertown Arsenal Boston Park League team for many years.

== Military service ==
Matthews enlisted in the United States Army in 1950, and was stationed in Germany in 1952. He served in the Vietnam War, where was wounded by shrapnel in his leg and received a Purple Heart. He also received a Bronze Star Medal. He completed his service in 1972 as a first sergeant.
