= The Daily Orange =

Student newspaper at Syracuse University

- The Daily Orange print edition on April 23, 2026
- Type: Student newspaper
- Format: Tabloid
- School: Syracuse University
- Owner: The Daily Orange Corporation
- Founder: Irving R. Templeton
- Editor-in-chief: Delia Sara Rangel
- Managing editor: Noah Nussbaum
- Launched: September 15, 1903; 123 years ago
- Headquarters: 230 Euclid Avenue; Syracuse, New York; United States 13210
- Circulation: 6,000
- Website: dailyorange.com
- Free online archives: Archives

The Daily Orange, commonly referred to as The D.O., is an independent student newspaper published in Syracuse, New York. The paper is free, and its print edition is published once a week during the Syracuse University academic year.

The D.O. was one of the first college papers to become fully independent from its parent college. Its alumni work at nearly every major newspaper in the nation — The New York Times, Los Angeles Times, The Washington Post, The Wall Street Journal, Chicago Tribune, The Philadelphia Inquirer, New York Post, The Boston Globe, Star Tribune, The Dallas Morning News, and The Atlanta Journal-Constitution — in a variety of reporting, editing, design and photography roles.

Publisher reported circulation for 2018 was 6,000 copies, with an online circulation of about 3,000,000 during publishing months. The paper's content is published online daily and the print edition is published every Thursday during the academic year.

== History ==
=== Early years ===
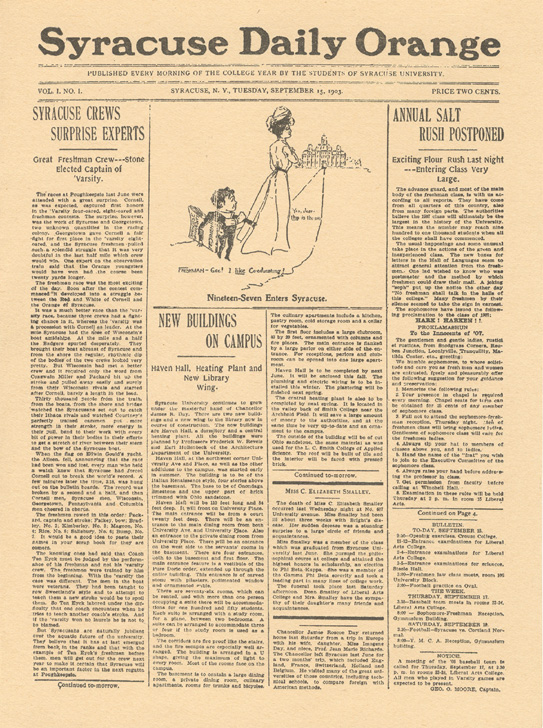
The first copy of The Daily Orange was published on September 15, 1903.

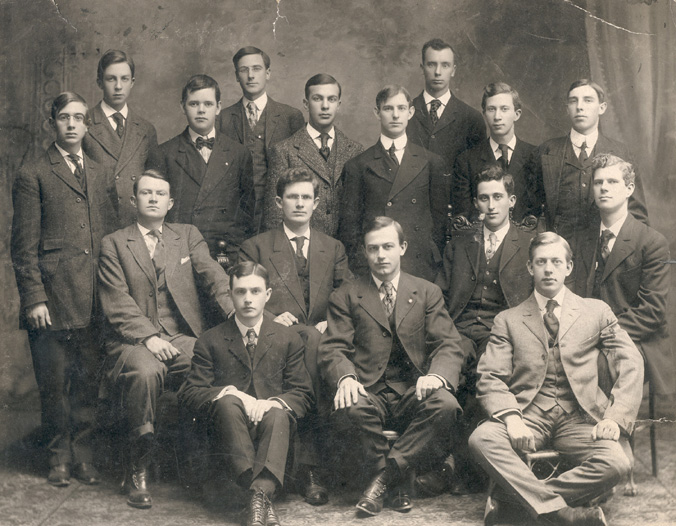
Staff of the Daily Orange in 1909

The first copy of the newspaper was published on September 15, 1903. Irving R. Templeton, co-founder of the Orange Publishing Company, served as the founding editor of the newspaper. Prior to the D.O., there were only 18 colleges and universities represented by a daily college paper.

The newspaper set up operations in a red barn located at 806 Croton Ave, and accepted advertising. From 1903 until at least 1922, a copy cost two cents and the annual subscription cost $2.50 annually, and all students received mandatory subscription.

Syracuse was the third university after Brown and Columbia to have a printing shop owned and operated by students and the first university to own it completely. The printing plant was owned by a corporation known as the Orange Publishing Company, the directors and stockholders of which were all students. The newspaper even manufactured its own paper with the help of SU students from the College of Forestry.

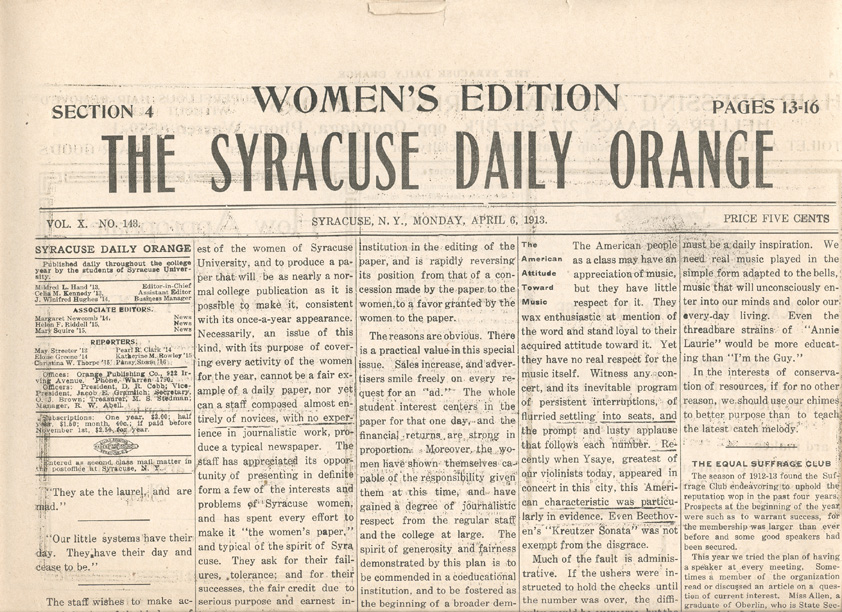
Women's edition of Daily Orange on April 6, 1913

The D.O. operated as the official university paper but often had fractious relationship with the administration.

In 1910, The D.O. published an issue that was managed by an all-female team, which later became an annual tradition. In 1939, Elizabeth C. Donnelly, of Syracuse, became the first female to be elected the editor-in-chief.

In 1927, The D.O. started carrying news of the world affairs through the United News Press service making it one the few college papers to do so. In 1933, it was ranked amongst the best college newspapers.

=== Towards independence ===
In the mid-1960s, student newspapers all over the U.S. began pressing for separation from the control of the university administration. The D.O. was considered part of SU; the administration had installed a paid business manager and sold advertising to assure enough money to print every day. The administration could possibly influence the content of the paper based on financial holds, which created friction between the administration and the paper. This relationship was further strained by The Daily Orange's criticism over how the school handled highly charged situations such as the racism on the football team and the Vietnam protests. In the summer of 1970, The D.O. briefly stopped printing due to lack of financial support.

A major turning point in D.O. history occurred in 1971. In April 1971, the university refused to back The D.O. in a $938,000 libel suit, and also decided to install a new editor without the input of the D.O. staff. In May 1971, the editorial staff decided to sever the ties that existed with the administration.

On October 26, 1971, the 'new' D.O. was formed by a merger of The Daily Orange daily (revolutionary socialist) and two weeklies – Dialog (moderate) and Promethean (Liberal Democratic). The new paper became a student organization that received funding for production costs from the Student Government Association (now known as the Student Association). A referendum vote determined whether the student body would continue to contribute a portion of its fee.

=== Full independence ===
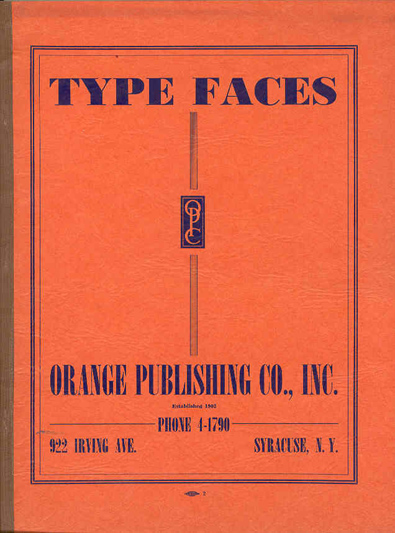
Typeface book cover for Daily Orange by the Orange Publishing Company

The Daily Orange logo for over 30 years; in use until 2022.

In December 1991, editor-in-chief Jodi Lamagna and her staff decided to refuse any further funding from SGA. In the process, The D.O. became one of the few completely independent student newspapers in the country. Since then, The D.O. has operated with complete financial independence from the university, raising funds necessary for publishing a daily paper through advertising revenue and fundraising. Though it still maintains a business relationship with the university, in regards to its status as a student group and its housing agreement, its relationship with administrators has no bearing on its editorial content.

In 1999, the D.O. editors and then SU Chancellor Kenneth Shaw signed an agreement giving The D.O. rights to deliver papers on campus, the ability to lease 744 Ostrom Ave from the university as an office building, and access to all university buildings and administrators necessary for reporting purposes.

In 2005, The D.O. underwent a layout redesign to give paper renewed sense of ‘identity’. This revamp included new logo partially designed by Jim Parkinson.

In 2008, the D.O. dropped to the Friday print edition due to declining advertising sales. The Tuesday print edition was dropped starting in fall 2018 to focus on digital content. The Wednesday print edition was dropped in Fall 2020 due to the COVID-19 pandemic. As of 2023, the D.O. prints only on Thursday mornings.

In 2020, the D.O. launched a membership program for readers.

The Special Collections Research Center of the Syracuse University libraries has an archived collection of the published papers.

=== CIA lawsuit ===
In the early 1980s, The Daily Orange was a plaintiff in a lawsuit against the Central Intelligence Agency (CIA). The D.O. had sued the CIA to obtain documents relating to alleged CIA activity on campus during the late 1960s and early 1970s. Syracuse lost the case when district judge Howard G. Munson ruled that the issues were exempt from disclosure.

== Facilities ==
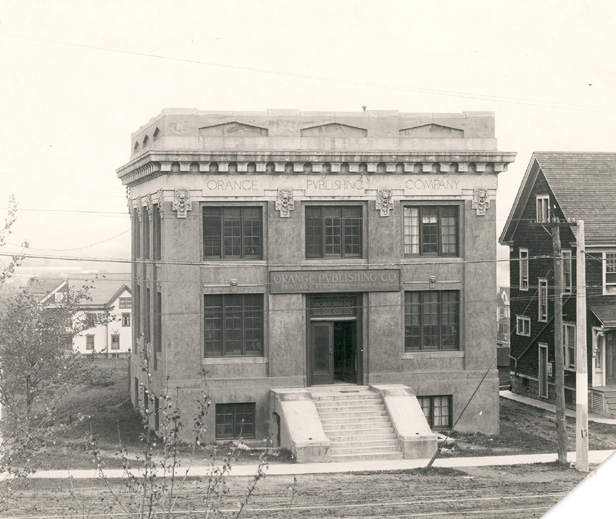
Orange Publishing Company building (c. 1920s)

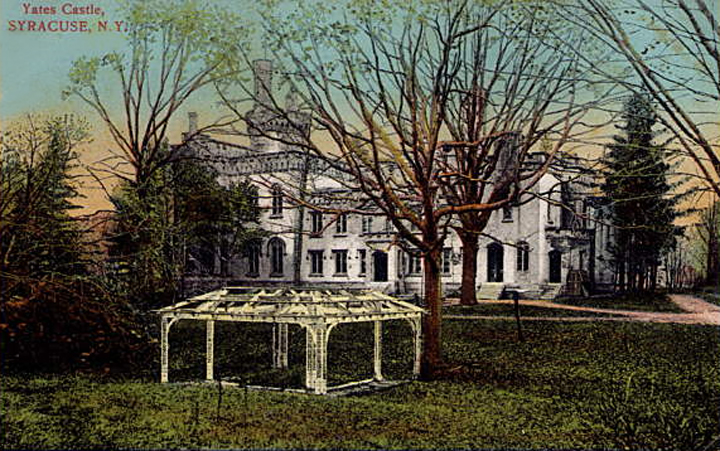
Yates castle c. 1910

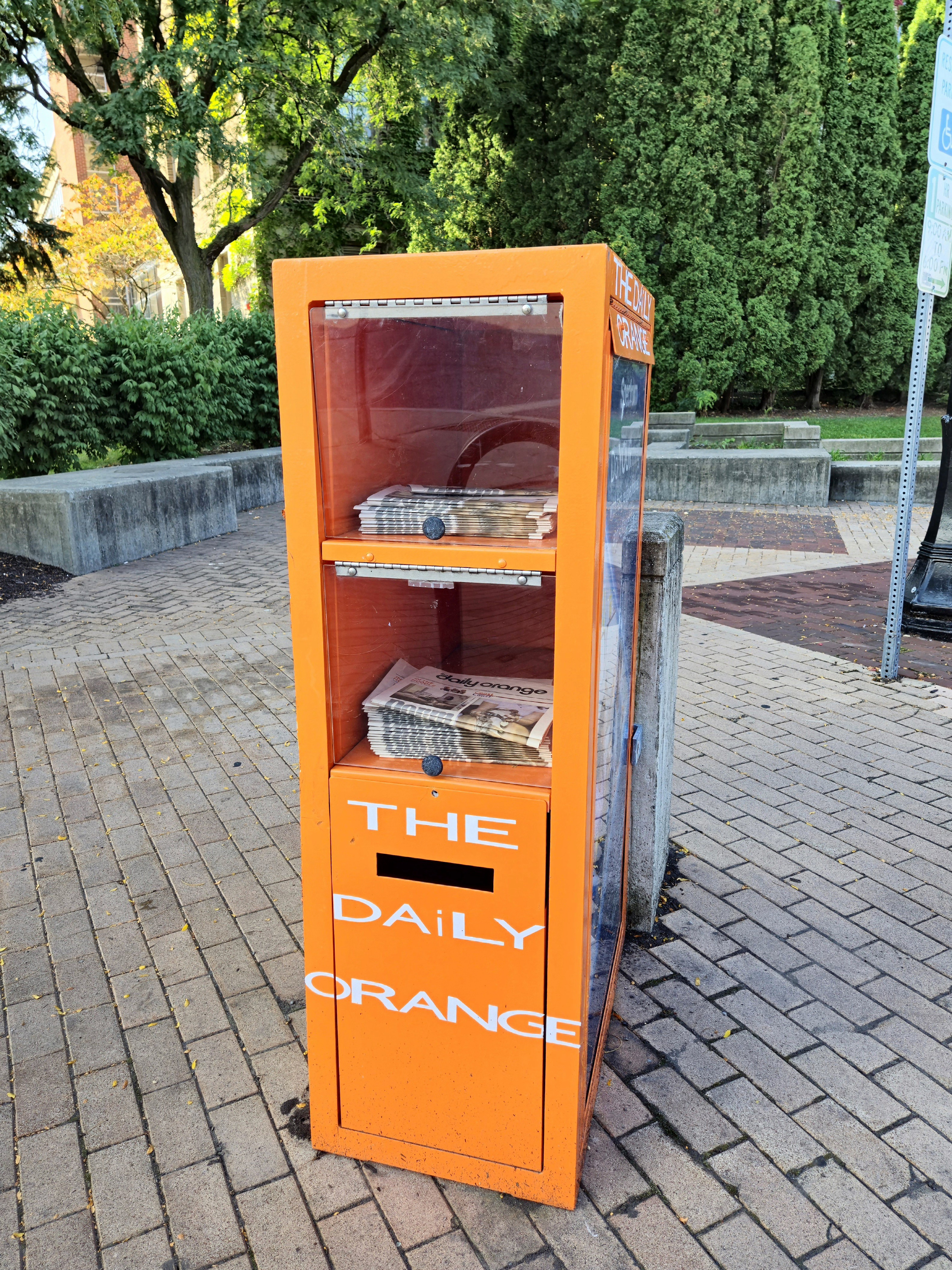
Daily Orange newspaper stand on Marshall Street

The newspaper set up operations in a red barn located at 806 Croton Ave on corner of Irving Ave, and moved to a building (922 Irving Avenue) owned by the Orange Publishing company in 1907.

Beginning in 1934 the paper took up residence at Yates Castle when the journalism department was moved there. It was housed there until 1948, when some of the staff moved to pre-fab containers behind Yates Castle. This arrangement came to an end when the castle was demolished in 1953.

The D.O. moved to the George Clinton House on 1101 E. Adams street in 1967.

In 1999, the D.O. signed an agreement with then SU Chancellor Kenneth Shaw to lease 744 Ostrom Ave from the university as an office building, which it had been occupying since 1983.

In 2019, the paper moved its office from 774 Ostrom Ave to 230 Euclid Ave due to construction plans as well as long term updates in Syracuse University's master plan.

== Comics ==
The D.O. was the first student newspaper to have comics. The paper has produced many famous cartoonists, such as Vaughn Bodē, Robb Armstrong (creator of Jump Start), Brad Anderson (creator of Marmaduke), Steve Ellis and Nicholas Gurewitch (creator of The Perry Bible Fellowship). Pulitzer Prize winner Jim Morin served as editorial cartoonist during his senior year at SU.

== Awards and rankings ==
The paper has in the past decade won numerous awards, including more than a dozen "story of the year" awards in several categories from the Associated Collegiate Press and top-story honors from the William Randolph Hearst Foundation.

The Princeton Review has ranked the D.O. the best college newspaper every year since 2016.

The D.O. was named the best all-around student newspaper in the country by the Society of Professional Journalists in 2017. In 2005, the D.O. was named the best-designed student newspaper in the country by the University of Missouri Student Society for News Design.

In 2021, College Choice ranked the D.O. #2 in the nation.

During the 2021-22 academic year, the D.O. was ranked first in the total number of articles published by students newspapers in the U.S., with 4,969 articles published.

== Notable alumni ==
- Robb Armstrong, author of Jump Start comic strip
- Jessica Cutler, photo editor, The Washingtonienne
- Meredith Goldstein, Living|Arts writer, The Boston Globe
- Nicholas Gurewitch, author of The Perry Bible Fellowship comic strip, The Guardian
- Mike Kelly, columnist, The Record
- Larry S. Kramer, former president and publisher, USA Today
- Michael Kranish, political reporter, The Washington Post
- Steve Kroft, journalist & long-time correspondent for 60 Minutes
- Jerre Mangione, writer and scholar of the Sicilian-American experience
- Jim Morin, Pulitzer Prize winning editorial cartoonist, Miami Herald
- Jeff Passan, national baseball writer, ESPN
- Jayson Stark, national baseball writer, The Athletic and MLB Network contributor
- Eli Saslow, Pulitzer Prize winning reporter at The New York Times

== In popular culture ==
- In the September 20, 2018 episode of the TV game show Jeopardy!, a clue in the category "Orange You Glad" was, "First published in 1903, the Daily Orange is this New York university's student newspaper".
