= Robb Armstrong =

American cartoonist (born 1962)

- Born: Robbin Armstrong; March 4, 1962 (age 64); Philadelphia, Pennsylvania
- Education: Syracuse University
- Occupation: Cartoonist
- Notable work: Jump Start
- Spouse: Crystal D. Armstrong
- Website: www.robbarmstrong.com

Robb Armstrong (born March 4, 1962) is an African American cartoonist, best known for creating the comic strip Jump Start. Jump Start is the most widely syndicated daily strip written by an African American.

== Early life and education ==
Armstrong was born on March 4, 1962, in West Philadelphia, Pennsylvania. Armstrong's mother, Dorothy was a seamstress. He was the youngest of the five children.

Armstrong attended the Shipley School in Bryn Mawr. During the senior year of high-school he completed a three-week internship with cartoonist Signe Wilkinson. He studied advertising design at the College of Visual and Performing Arts at Syracuse University and graduated with a Bachelor of Fine Arts degree.

== Career ==
=== Early career ===
During college, he began submitting his comic Hector to The Daily Orange his freshman year and later became art director at the newspaper. Hector is a cynical, lazy black college kid who is accompanied by Meatball and Julias; a dog with human ears. When this character didn't work well outside the college boundaries, he worked over the next four years to reshape Hector into Jump Start. During his early years as a cartoonist, he held a day-job at Weightman advertising in Philadelphia.

=== Jump Start ===
Jump Start, Armstrong's comic strip revolves around the trials and tribulations of a middle-class Black family in Philadelphia that is made up of Joseph "Joe" Cobb Sr., a city police officer, and Marcy Cobb, a nurse and their four children. The family is named after the Cobbs Creek neighborhood located in West Philadelphia.

After being picked for syndication by United Feature Syndicate in October 1989, the cartoon appeared in 69 papers within six months of launch. Since its launch in 1989 around 10,000 comics have been created. As of 2018, it is syndicated in over 300 newspapers throughout North America, including The Los Angeles Times, New York Daily News, and The Boston Globe.

In 2020, Armstrong stated that he is working on a possible live-action comedy television show based on Jump Start.

=== Other work ===
In October 2010, Armstrong's work was featured in The Original Art of the Funny Papers exhibition at Syracuse university's XL Projects gallery in Armory Square. On May 19, 2012, Armstrong received an honorary Doctor of Humane Letters, Honoris causa degree from Holy Family University in Pennsylvania.

In 2016, Armstrong published a part self-help book, part memoir titled Fearless: A Cartoonist's Guide to Life.

=== Influences ===
Armstrong lists Charles M. Schulz as one of his influences and heroes, saying that he started drawing sketches of Charlie Brown at age five. As part of the 1994 animated television special You're in the Super Bowl, Charlie Brown, Schulz gave his Franklin, the Peanuts strip's Black character, the surname Armstrong, after Robb Armstrong. Armstrong was later chosen to co-write the 2024 Peanuts special, Snoopy Presents: Welcome Home, Franklin, the first special to star the character.

== Personal life ==
Armstrong has two children and is married to Crystal D. Armstrong, an events planner. They reside in Los Angeles, California.

A great uncle, Eugene Benson, played baseball in the Negro league and the majors.

== Publications ==
- Armstrong, Robb (1997). JumpStart. Kansas City: Andrews McMeel Publishing. ISBN 9780836236613. OCLC 37923054.
- Armstrong, Robb (2016). Fearless: A Cartoonist's Guide to Life. New York: Reader's Digest. ISBN 9781621452874. OCLC 990821669.
