= Bill Jackman (baseball) =

American baseball player (1897–1972)

- Pitcher
- Born: October 7, 1897; Carta Valley, Texas, U.S.
- Died: September 9, 1972 (aged 74); Marion, Massachusetts, U.S.
- Batted: Right Threw: Right

Negro league baseball debut
- 1925, for the New York Lincoln Giants

Last appearance
- 1942, for the Brooklyn Royal Giants
- Stats at Baseball Reference

Teams
- New York Lincoln Giants (1925); Philadelphia Giants (1925–1927); Philadelphia Quaker City Giants (1928); Philadelphia Tigers (1928); Brooklyn/Newark Eagles (1935–1936); Boston Royal Giants (1942)

William "Cannonball" Jackman (October 7, 1897 – September 9, 1972) was an American professional baseball pitcher in the Negro leagues. He played from 1925 to 1942 with several teams, including a spot on the otherwise all-white East Douglas team in Massachusetts's amateur Blackstone Valley League in 1929, a squad which also featured 18-year-old newcomer Hank Greenberg.

Jackman received votes listing him on the 1952 Pittsburgh Courier player-voted poll of the Negro leagues' best players ever.
