= Edwin Dimes =

American baseball player

- Outfielder
- Born: June 23, 1904; New Orleans, Louisiana, U.S.
- Died: September 28, 1999 (aged 95); Cleveland, Ohio, U.S.
- Batted: Right Threw: Right

Negro league baseball debut
- 1926, for the Dayton Marcos

Last appearance
- 1933, for the Akron Black Tyrites
- Stats at Baseball Reference

Teams
- Dayton Marcos (1926); Akron Black Tyrites (1933)

Edwin Charles Dimes (June 23, 1904 – September 28, 1999) was an American professional baseball outfielder in the Negro leagues. He played with the Dayton Marcos in 1926 and the Akron Black Tyrites in 1933.
