= Coley Logan =

American baseball player

- Born: September 20, 1912; Columbia, South Carolina
- Died: November 8, 1999 (aged 87); Hudson, New York
- Batted: Right Threw: Right

Negro league baseball debut
- 1940, for the Philadelphia Stars

Last appearance
- 1940, for the Philadelphia Stars

Teams
- Philadelphia Stars (1940)

Coley Logan (September 20, 1912 – November 8, 1999) was an American Negro league baseball player in the 1940s.

A native of Columbia, South Carolina, Logan played for the Philadelphia Stars in 1940. He died in Hudson, New York, in 1999 at age 87.
