= Larry S. Kramer =

American journalist

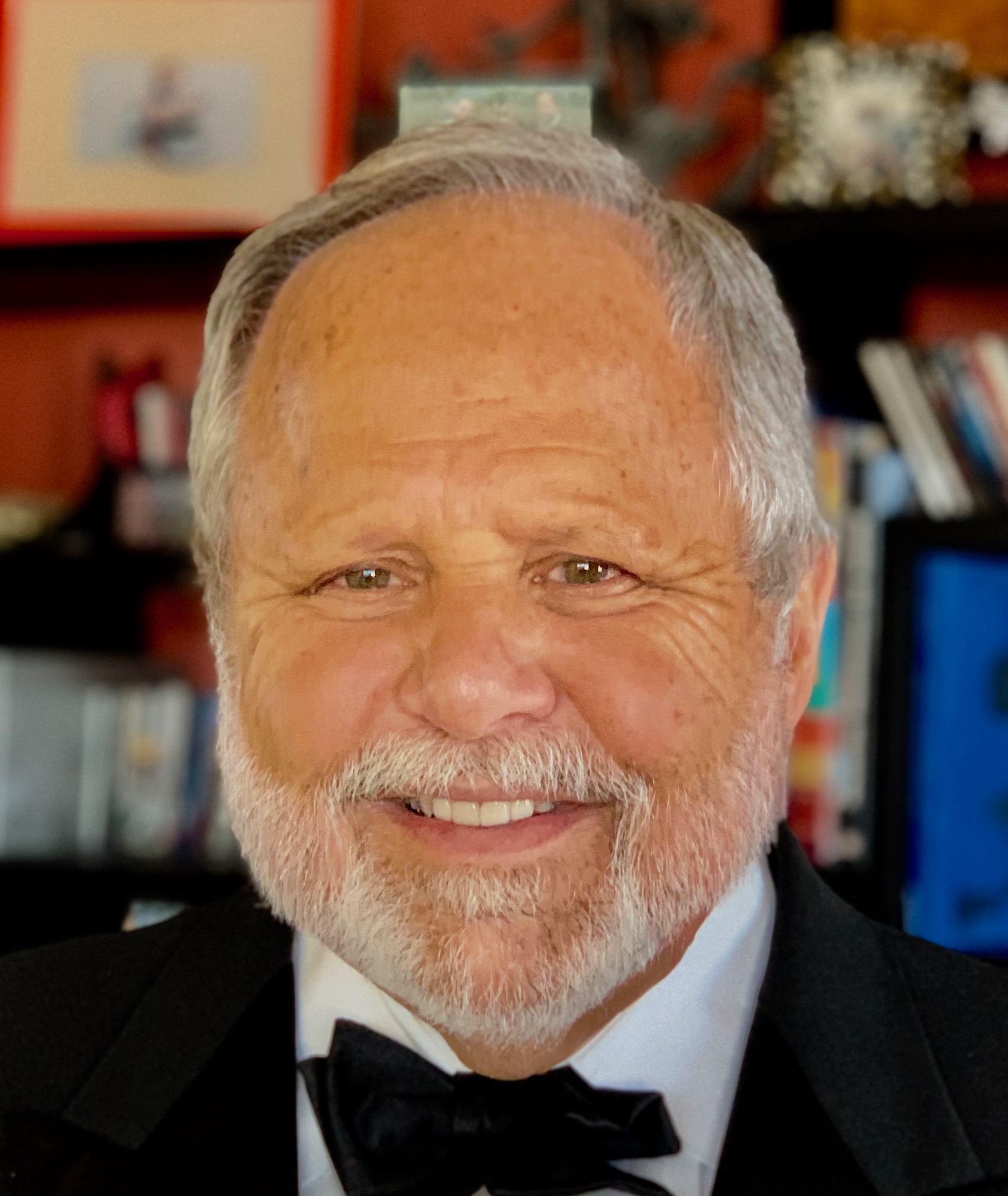
- Larry Kramer in 2019
- Born: Lawrence Stephen Kramer; April 24, 1950 (age 76); Hackensack, New Jersey, U.S.
- Education: Syracuse University; Harvard University
- Occupations: Journalist, editor

Lawrence Stephen Kramer (born April 24, 1950) is an American journalist, entrepreneur, and corporate executive based in New York City, USA.

== Education ==
Kramer graduated from the S. I. Newhouse School of Public Communications at Syracuse University in 1972 with a degree in magazine journalism and political science. At Syracuse, he served as an editor of The Daily Orange as a freshman, and became editor of now defunct weekly Promethean in sophomore year. He holds a master's degree in business administration from Harvard Business School.

== Career ==
From 1977 to 1986, Kramer served as a reporter and editor for The Washington Post. Then from 1986 to 1991, Kramer worked at the San Francisco Examiner as an Executive Editor.

In 1991, he founded DataSport. In 1993 he sold DataSport to Data Broadcasting Corp and became the vice president of Data Broadcasting Corp.

Kramer founded CBS MarketWatch in 1997. He served as the chairman and CEO, and took it public in 1999. In 2005, Dow Jones acquired MarketWatch for more than $500 million.

In 2006, Larry Kramer became the president of CBS Digital Media, creating and running the new division. In 2006, he signed a deal with YouTube and Apple to put CBS entertainment content on the internet. In the same year, he also transitioned March Madness and The Masters online on CBS Sportsline.

In 2012, Larry became the President and Publisher of USA Today. He retired from that post in 2015 and became a director for Gannett Co.

In 2016, he became the chairman and interim CEO of TheStreet.

== Personal life ==
Kramer is married to Myla Lerner, a theatre producer. They have two adult children.
