= Willis Flournoy =

American baseball player (1895–1964)

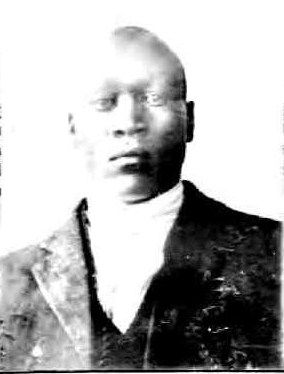
- Pitcher
- Born: August 9, 1895; Monticello, Georgia, U.S.
- Died: November 22, 1964 (aged 69)
- Batted: Right Threw: Right

Negro league baseball debut
- 1919, for the Hilldale Club

Last appearance
- 1932, for the Baltimore Black Sox
- Stats at Baseball Reference

Teams
- Hilldale Club (1919–1923); Bacharach Giants (1920); Atlanta Black Crackers (1920); Brooklyn Royal Giants (1923–1928); Baltimore Black Sox (1929–1932)

Career highlights and awards
- Eastern Colored League ERA leader (1926)

Willis Jefferson Flournoy (August 9, 1895 – November 22, 1964) was an American professional baseball pitcher in the Negro leagues. He played from 1919 to 1932. He was nicknamed Jesse, Lefty, and Pud. He won the Eastern Colored League earned run average (ERA) title in 1926 for the Brooklyn Royal Giants.

On August 19, 1925, Flournoy struck William Williams, 18, while driving at a Brooklyn intersection. He then drove Williams, who was found to have a fractured skull and possible internal injuries, to the hospital for treatment. Flournoy reported the incident to police, who did not press charges.
