= Curtis Brown (first baseman) =

American baseball player (1923–1999)

- First baseman
- Born: July 15, 1923; Key West, Florida, U.S.
- Died: December 3, 1999 (aged 76); Lithonia, Georgia, U.S.
- Batted: Unknown Threw: Unknown

Negro league baseball debut
- 1947, for the New York Black Yankees

Last appearance
- 1947, for the New York Black Yankees
- Stats at Baseball Reference

Teams
- New York Black Yankees (1947)

Curtis Brown (July 15, 1923 – December 3, 1999) was an American professional baseball first baseman in the Negro leagues. He played with the New York Black Yankees in 1947.
