= Howie Haak =

American Major League Baseball scout (1911–1999)

Howard Frederick Haak
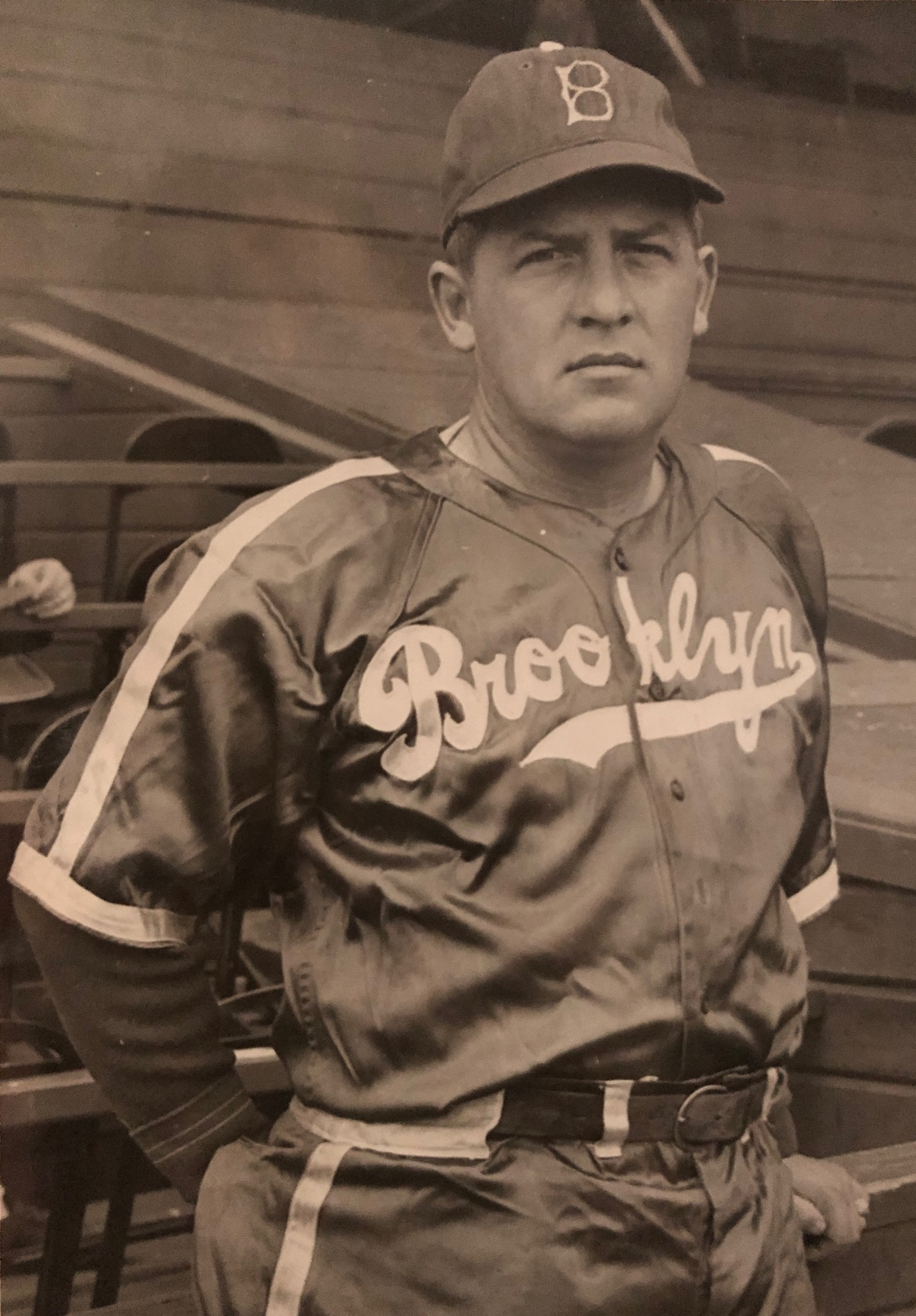
- Born: August 28, 1911; Rochester, New York
- Died: February 22, 1999 (aged 87); Palm Springs, California
- Batted: Right Threw: Right

Teams
- As scout: Brooklyn Dodgers (1945–1950); Pittsburgh Pirates (1950–1988); Houston Astros (1989–1993)

Career highlights and awards
- 3× World Series champion (1960, 1971, 1979); Recommended Roberto Clemente for the Pirates and helped open the door to Latin American players in Major League Baseball; First recipient of the Scout of the Year, Scout of the Year Foundation, in 1984; Topps Scout of the Month Award, National Association of Professional Baseball Leagues in 1973, 1974, 1975

Howard Frederick Haak (August 28, 1911 — February 22, 1999; /ˈheɪk/; rhymes with "take") was an American professional baseball scout for almost 50 years, from the end of World War II through his 1993 retirement.

== Personal life ==
Haak was born in Rochester, New York, in 1911, the son of Chester Arthur Haak and Wanda Alice (née Ruddy). He graduated from Madison Junior High and Rochester West High School. Haak later enrolled at the University of Rochester, where he majored in medicine and chemistry, and was a member of Psi Upsilon fraternity.

Haak married Virginia Edholm in Manassas, Virginia on June 16, 1939, and had two daughters, Betty Olson and Marjorie Archuleta. The couple later divorced. Haak married his second wife, Crystal Tate, in Yuma, Arizona on January 12, 1954, after he spotted her sitting in a box seat in Hollywood’s Gilmore Field. They had one child together, Phillip Von Haak, in August of 1959.

== Playing and early scouting career ==
Baseball Reference lists no playing record under Haak's entry but, according to his New York Times obituary and an interview with Tom Bird published in the February 1994 issue of Baseball Digest, Haak was a catcher in the extensive St. Louis Cardinals farm system during the 1930s. According to the Bird interview, a badly injured throwing arm ended Haak's playing career, but he was still in the game as traveling secretary of the Cards' Rochester Red Wings farm club at the close of the 1941 season when he answered the telephone in a deserted Red Wings' clubhouse. The caller was Cardinals' general manager Branch Rickey.

"He said, 'I need an outfielder right now for the big club. Is there anyone there who can help us?'" Haak recalled in 1994. "'Yeah,' I said, 'Musial, and take Kurowski and Dusak with him.'" Hall of Famer Stan Musial went on to set the National League record for hits (later broken by all-time hits leader Pete Rose), while Whitey Kurowski starred as a third baseman on St. Louis' 1940s dynasty and Erv Dusak had a creditable MLB career as an outfielder.

During the Second World War, Rickey left St. Louis to take over the Brooklyn Dodger organization, and when he expanded his scouting staff at the war's end in 1945, he hired Haak as a full-time Brooklyn scout. In that capacity, Haak was one of several Dodger evaluators who scouted Jackie Robinson while he played in the Negro leagues. Robinson ultimately broke the baseball color line and went on to the Hall of Fame.

== Scouted Latin America and Caribbean ==
Although he spoke little Spanish, he became perhaps the best-known Major League Baseball scout of his era who worked in Latin America and the Caribbean, and signed "scores of players" during his career from Puerto Rico, the Dominican Republic, Panama, Cuba, and the Virgin Islands — most of them for the Pittsburgh Pirates, for whom Haak worked for 38 years. Haak also played a key role in the Pirates' decision to select Roberto Clemente in the 1954 Rule 5 draft; the right fielder from Puerto Rico would go on to make 3,000 hits, win two World Series championships and the 1971 World Series MVP award, and earn an immediate place in the Baseball Hall of Fame upon his death in an airplane crash while on a humanitarian mission to Nicaragua.

== Clemente's success opened door ==
Haak followed Rickey to the Pirates at the close of the 1950 season. Four years later, after scouting the Triple-A International League, he recommended the drafting of Clemente (ironically, from Brooklyn), who had been "hidden" on the Montreal Royals roster during the 1954 season. The highly talented, 19-year-old Clemente was only given 148 at bats with Montreal because the Dodgers did not have room for him on their MLB roster and didn't want to expose him to rival scouts and the Rule 5 draft.

Clemente's success inspired Haak, and the Pirate front office, to take an aggressive role in scouting Latin America and the Caribbean. According to his obituary, Haak's signings included José DeLeón, Cecilio Guante, Al McBean, Román Mejías, Omar Moreno, Manny Sanguillén, and Rennie Stennett. Many of these players were crucial members of the Pirates' 1971 and 1979 world championship teams. "We thank God for him", Sanguillén was quoted as saying in Haak's Times obituary. "He's opened the door for us."

Haak was the first recipient of the Scout of the Year award in 1984 in recognition of his lifetime of achievement. He left Pittsburgh after the 1988 season, and spent the final five years of his scouting career working for the Houston Astros, retiring at the age of 82. He died five years later, aged 87, in Palm Springs, California.

== Comments regarding fans, attendance and non-white players ==
Haak stunned baseball early in 1982, when he was quoted by the Associated Press as saying the Pirates' attendance woes were due to white fans being unattracted to a team with a high percentage of non-white players. Haak stated that "the people won't come out if you have too many blacks on a team, not if you have nine", and that the Pirates needed to recruit more whites for the team. The Pirates' owner, John Galbreath, described the quote as "very unfortunate", and denied that the statement reflected his beliefs or his son Dan's. The Pirates' third baseman, Bill Madlock, who was African-American, commented that Haak "told the truth...But it has been said before, so I can't understand why it is such a big thing."
