= Leonard Johnson (baseball) =

Professional baseball player

- Pitcher
- Batted: Unknown Threw: Unknown

Negro league baseball debut
- 1947, for the Chicago American Giants

Last appearance
- 1948, for the Kansas City Monarchs
- Stats at Baseball Reference

Teams
- Chicago American Giants (1947); Kansas City Monarchs (1948)

Leonard Johnson was a professional baseball pitcher in the Negro leagues. He played with the Chicago American Giants in 1947 and the Kansas City Monarchs in 1948. He also played in the Mexican League from 1949 to 1951 with the Tecolotes de Nuevo Laredo, and in the Mandak League in 1951.
