= Joe Perez (baseball) =

American baseball player (born 1999)

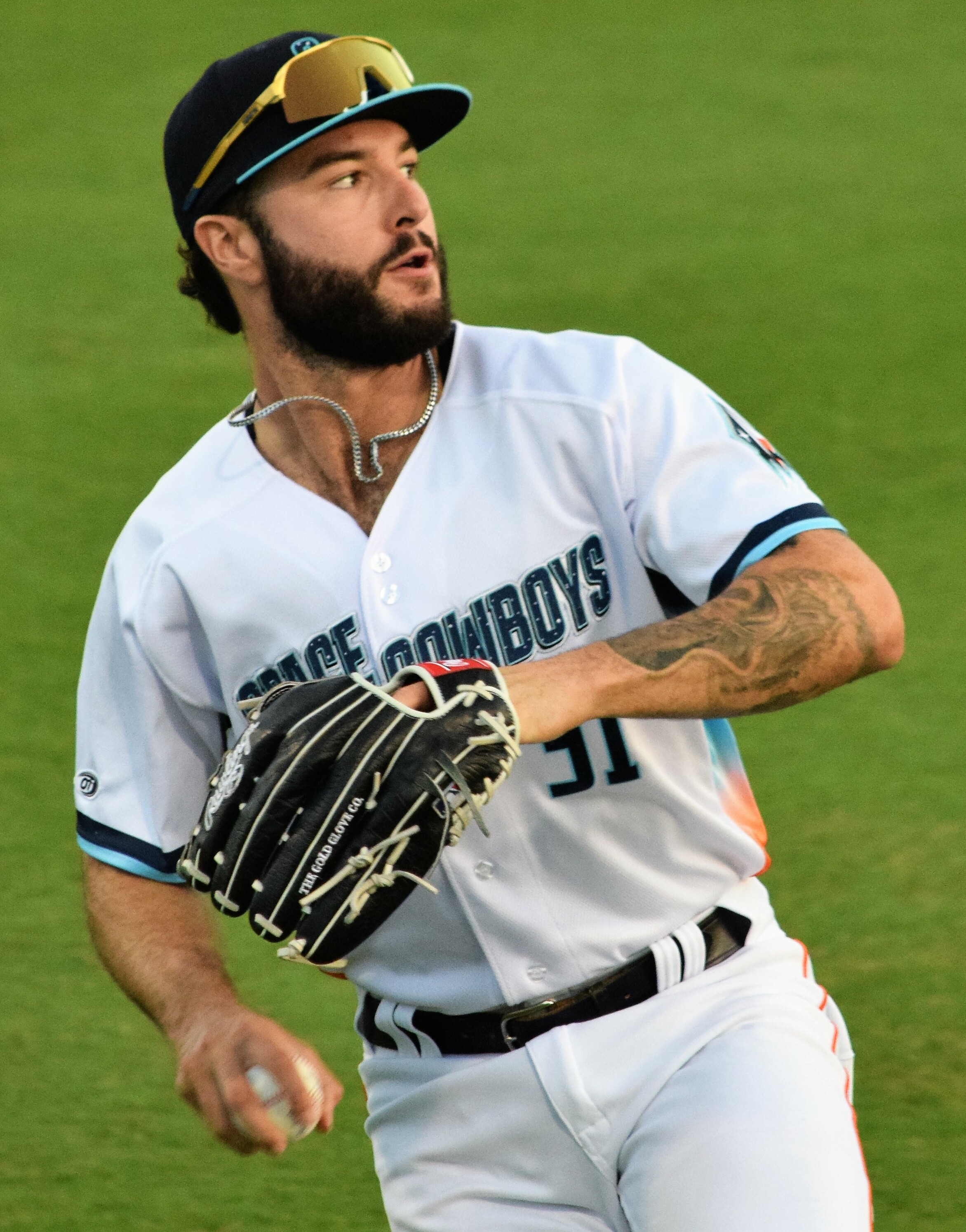
- Perez with the Sugar Land Space Cowboys in 2023

Free agent
- Third baseman
- Born: August 12, 1999 (age 27); Pembroke Pines, Florida, U.S.
- Bats: Right Throws: Right

MLB debut
- April 8, 2022, for the Houston Astros

MLB statistics (through 2022 season)
- Batting average: .000
- Home runs: 0
- Runs batted in: 0
- Stats at Baseball Reference

Teams
- Houston Astros (2022)

Joseph Perez (born August 12, 1999) is an American professional baseball third baseman who is a free agent. He has previously played in Major League Baseball (MLB) for the Houston Astros.

== Amateur career ==
Perez attended Archbishop McCarthy High School in Southwest Ranches, Florida. As a senior, he hit .526 with nine home runs and 37 runs batted in (RBIs) and went 4–0 with a 1.88 earned run average (ERA) and 40 strikeouts as a pitcher. He was drafted by the Houston Astros in the second round of the 2017 Major League Baseball draft. He signed, forgoing his commitment to play college baseball at the University of Miami.

== Professional career ==
=== Houston Astros ===
Perez made his professional debut in 2018 with the Gulf Coast League Astros, batting .364 over 11 at-bats, and played 2019 with the Tri-City ValleyCats, hitting .188 with seven home runs and 27 RBI over fifty games. Due to the cancellation of the 2020 Minor League Baseball season because of the COVID-19 pandemic, he did not play for a team. Perez started 2021 with the Fayetteville Woodpeckers before being promoted to the Asheville Tourists and Corpus Christi Hooks. Over 106 games between the three teams, he slashed .291/.354/.495 with 18 home runs, 61 RBIs, and 34 doubles. Perez was selected to the 40-man roster following the season on November 19, 2021.

On April 8, 2022, the Astros called Perez up to the major leagues for the first time and made his MLB debut that night. He spent the remainder of the year in the minor leagues, slashing .290/.359/.417 with 7 home runs and 37 RBI in 83 games for four minor league affiliates.

Perez was optioned to the Triple-A Sugar Land Space Cowboys to begin the 2023 season. In 87 games, he batted .255/.328/.399 with 10 home runs and 47 RBI. On August 1, Perez was designated for assignment following Houston's acquisition of Justin Verlander. He was released by the Astros organization on August 4.

=== Pittsburgh Pirates ===
On August 11, 2023, Perez signed a minor league contract with the Pittsburgh Pirates organization. He spent the remainder of the year split between Pittsburgh's Double–A and Triple–A affiliates.

Perez began the 2024 campaign with the Triple–A Indianapolis Indians before he was reassigned to the Double–A Altoona Curve. In 69 games split between the two affiliates, he batted .220/.288/.352 with six home runs and 39 RBI. Perez was released by the Pirates organization on July 14, 2024.

=== York Revolution ===
On July 30, 2024, Perez signed with the York Revolution of the Atlantic League of Professional Baseball. In 13 games for the Revolution, he slashed .277/.294/.404 with two home runs, eight RBI, and two stolen bases. With York, Perez won the Atlantic League championship.

=== Chicago White Sox ===
On January 22, 2025, Perez signed a minor league contract with the Chicago White Sox. He made three appearances for the rookie-level Arizona Complex League White Sox as a pitcher, but struggled to a 27.00 ERA with two strikeouts across 1 2/3 innings pitched. Perez elected free agency following the season on November 6.
