= Sam Barber (baseball) =

American baseball player

- Pitcher
- Born: September 17, 1919; Birmingham, Alabama, U.S.
- Died: April 18, 1999 (aged 79); Birmingham, Alabama, U.S.
- Batted: Unknown Threw: Unknown

Negro league baseball debut
- 1940, for the Birmingham Black Barons

Last appearance
- 1940, for the Birmingham Black Barons
- Stats at Baseball Reference

Teams
- Birmingham Black Barons (1940)

Samuel Barber (September 17, 1919 – April 18, 1999) was an American professional baseball pitcher in the Negro leagues.

A native of Birmingham, Alabama, Barber played with the Birmingham Black Barons in 1940, and served in the US Army during World War II. He died in Birmingham in 1999 at age 79.
