= Buck Felder =

American baseball player

- Shortstop / Second baseman
- Born: September 25, 1915; Galveston, Texas, U.S.
- Died: January 9, 1999 (aged 83); Chattanooga, Tennessee, U.S.
- Batted: Right Threw: Right

Negro league baseball debut
- 1944, for the Chicago American Giants

Last appearance
- 1945, for the Birmingham Black Barons
- Stats at Baseball Reference

Teams
- Chicago American Giants (1944); Memphis Red Sox (1944-1945); Birmingham Black Barons (1945)

Kendall Perkins Felder (September 25, 1915 – January 9, 1999) was an American professional baseball shortstop and second baseman in the Negro leagues. He played with the Chicago American Giants, Memphis Red Sox, and Birmingham Black Barons in 1945.
