= Boston Park League =

Oldest amateur baseball league in the United States

The Boston Park League, located in Boston, Massachusetts, is the oldest amateur baseball league in the United States.

== History ==

The Boston Park League (BPL) was founded in 1929 by Bob Cusick, program director for the Boston Parks and Recreation Department. Cusick envisioned a high quality, yet highly participatory, amateur baseball league with teams based in, and featuring residents of, the various neighborhoods of Boston. Charlestown, East Boston, South Boston, Hyde Park, Brighton, West Roxbury, Roslindale, Jamaica Plain, Roxbury, Mattapan, South End, and Dorchester all have had teams at some period of time.

The league was rabidly popular among local area baseball fans, and in the 1930s and 1940s many games would draw as many as 5,000 attendees. Once the playoffs got underway, that number was known to swell to as many as 12,000 fans per game. Attendance remained high throughout the 1950s and 1960s, often in the range of 5,000 to 6,000 fans per game.

Such popularity made the league among the best compilations of amateur talent in the nation, featuring top quality players from local and regional high schools and universities. At its peak, the BPL comprised a sizeable population of former professional players, many of whom still had hopes of garnering enough attention to get another shot at a professional position.

The league has always been considered an amateur league, although for a brief period in the 1960s the league actually did pay a few select players, often higher profile ex-pros, in hopes of raising the league's profile and quality of play. Former Red Sox relief pitcher Mike Fornieles is a prime example, playing a number of years for the league's Supreme Saints.

In recent decades, the league's presence has diminished somewhat, becoming less of a regional draw. However, the quality of play and passion among its players remain high. Attendance is also lower, with most games at present drawing a more modest number of fans, often less than 100 for mid-week, regular-season matchups, although some weekend and playoff games can still draw 500 or more attendees. The league is still considered to be the gold standard of amateur baseball in the Boston metropolitan area and, aside from the extremely competitive Cape Cod League, remains arguably the best amateur baseball league in New England.

In 1982, the City of Boston decided to pass on the administrative duties to a small group of former players and coaches. The league named Bill Mahoney its first President, Harvey Soolman Secretary Treasurer, and Walt Mortimer Umpire in Chief. With the need for more funding, the Budweiser Brewing Co. of Medford, distributors of Bud Light, sponsored the league for four years. The Yawkey Foundation came on board in 1986, and has continuously sponsored the Boston Park League for the last 27 years.

During the baseball strike of the mid-1990s, many Boston Park League players were granted spring training invitations by Major League teams, including 1993 BPL League Most Valuable Player Mike Carista, who was offered an invitation to spring training by the Boston Red Sox. Carista was a former Red Sox draft pick, but had left professional baseball years earlier.

== List of League Presidents ==
- Bill Mahoney (1982)
- Leo Casey (1983–1984)
- Bill Stewart, Jr. (1985)
- Walt Mortimer (1986)
- Skip Landry (1987–1988)
- Josh Powell (1989)
- Bob Powers (1990–1992)
- Eddie Miller (1993–1995)
- Bob Wilkinson (1996–2001)
- Walter Bentson (2002–present)

== Notable players ==
Many notable players have spent time in the Boston Park League.

- John Casey, college coach
- Joe Coleman, pitcher
- Manny Delcarmen, pitcher
- Mike Fornieles, pitcher
- Richie Hebner, infielder
- Rich Hill, pitcher
- Billy Hoeft, pitcher
- Ty LaForest, infielder
- Kevin McGlinchy, pitcher
- Si Rosenthal, outfielder
- Pete Varney, catcher
- Scott Keurulainen, outfielder

== League Champions (Runners-up in Parentheses) ==
2019 - ADSL (E.I. Braves)

2018 - ADSL (TJO Sports)

2017 - TJO Sports (Boston Padres Baseball Club)

2016 - Towne Club (TJO Sports)

2015 - Palmer Club (ADSL)

2014 - Palmer Club (TJO Sports)

2013 - Cannon Club (Palmer Club)

2012 - Carlson Club (Cannon Club)

2012 - Carlson Club (J.M Force)

2010 - Carlson Club (Palmer Club)

2009 - Carlson Club (Stockyard)

2008 - Grossman Marketing (Carlson Club)

2007 - Boston Padres Baseball Club (Stockyard)

2006 - Palmer Club (Boston Padres Baseball Club)

2005 - Stockyard (Palmer Club)

2004 - Palmer Club (Carlson Club)

2003 - Palmer Club (Walsh Club)

2002 - Palmer Club (Hines/ADSL)

2001 - Hines/ADSL (Mass. Envelope)

2000 - Mass. Envelope (Palmer Club)

1999 - Palmer Club (Larkin Club)

1998 - Mass. Envelope (Towne Club)

1997 - Larkin Club (Mass. Envelope)

1996 - Larkin Club (Mass. Envelope)

1995 - Larkin Club (MRA D's)

1994 - ADSL/Avi Nelson (Larkin Club)

1993 - Serra Club (ADSL/Avi Nelson)

1992 - Mass. Envelope (Triple D's)

1991 - Towne Club (ADSL/Avi Nelson)

1990 - Hyde Park Sports (Triple D's)

1989 - ADSL (Hyde Park Sports)

1988 - Triple D's (Towne Club)

1987 - Triple D's (Great Scott)

1986 - Hyde Park Sports (Triple D's)

1985 - Towne Club (Great Scott)

1984 - Towne Club (Conley Club)

1983 - Mass. Envelope (Conley Club)

1982 - Mass. Envelope (Triple D's)

1981 - Triple D's (Great Scott)

1980 - Mahoney Club (Triple D's)

1979 - Supreme Saints (Mary Ann's)

1978 - Conley Club (Supreme Saints)

1977 - Mass. Envelope (Supreme Saints)

1976 - Conley Club (Supreme Saints)

1975 - Mass. Envelope (Conley Club)

1974 - Mass. Envelope (Conley Club)

1973 - Mass. Envelope (Conley Club)

1972 - Conley Club (Supreme Saints)

1971 - Franklin Club (Supreme Saints)

1970 - Mass. Envelope (Woolf Club)

1969 - Craven Club (Supreme Saints)

1968 - Woolf Club (Craven Club)

1967 - Supreme Saints (Mass. Envelope)

1966 - Herb Connelly Club (Supreme Saints)

1965 - Herb Connolly Club (Carlevale Braves)

1964 - Supreme Saints (Herb Connolly Club)

1963 - Supreme Saints (Bottomley Braves)

1962 - Kelley Club (Supreme Saints)

1961 - Charlestown Hawks (Dorchester Royals)

1960 - St. Paul's (McCormack)

1959 - St. Paul's (McCormack)

1958 - Charlestown Cardinals (McCormack)

1957 - St. Paul's (Crosby Club)

1956 - McCormack Club (St. Paul's)

1955 - St. Paul's (Bryan Club)

1954 - St. Paul's (Bryan Club)

1953 - St. Paul's (Bryan Club)

1952 - Hal Crosby Club (Jeveli Club)

1951 - Boston Elks (Crosby Club)

1950 - Kane Chevrolet (Jeveli Club)

1949 - Crownburners (Hyde Sq. Vets)

1948 - Crownburners (Dick Casey Club)

1947 - Dick Casey Club (Linehan Club)

1946 - Veterans Administration (Dick Casey Club)

1945 - Navy Yard AA (Linehan Club)

1944 - Dick Casey Club (Watertown Arsenal)

1943 - Dick Casey Club (Navy Yard)

1942 - Dick Casey Club (Navy Yard)

1941 - Dick Casey Club (Tobin Club)

1940 - Dick Casey Club (Roslindale Town Team)

1939 - Dick Casey Club (St. Augustine's)

1938 - St. Augustine's (Holy Name)

1937 - Dick Casey Club (Jordan Marsh)

1936 - Roslindale Wolfs (Jordan Marsh)

1935 - Jordan Marsh (Roslindale TT)

1934 - Jordan Marsh (Dick Casey Club)

1933 - Roslindale Town Team (Mulry Club)

1932 - St. Thomas (Roslindale Town Team)

1931 - St. Thomas (Edison Light)

1930 - Agawam A.A. (Gurnett & Co.)

1929 - St. Thomas, J.P. (South End Athletics)

== Playing Fields Currently Used by the BPL ==
- Dick Casey Town Field, Dorchester, Ma.
- Bill Stewart Diamond at Fallon Field, Roslindale, Ma.
- Jim Rice Field, South End, Boston, Ma.
- Cleveland Circle (Cassidy), Brighton, Ma.
- Kelley Field, Hyde Park, Ma.
- East Boston Stadium, East Boston, Ma.

Note, Kelley Field is maintained by the Commonwealth of Massachusetts' Department of Conservation & Recreation, while the others are maintained by the City of Boston's Parks Department.

== Current Teams in the BPL (2019) ==
- Boston Athletics Baseball Club
- Palmer Club
- TJO Sports
- ADSL
- Cannon Club
- Boston Padres
- Grossman Marketing (formerly Mass. Envelope)
- Towne Club

Mass Envelope is the current longest standing league member. They changed the name of their team to Grossman Marketing in the 2008 season, following a corporate rebranding in 2006.

2015 Boston Park League Standings

Palmer 21-11-2 *

TJO Sports 20-13-1

ADSL 20-14-0

Towne Club 18-5-1

Cannon 15-19-0

Grossman Marketing 12-19-3

Padres 9-24-1

- *League Champion (won playoffs)
- **Won tie-breaking game for 4th place

2015 Playoffs

Palmer Club defeats Towne Club (3-0) ADSL defeats TJO Sports (3-0)

Palmer Club defeats ADSL (4-1)

2015 Batting Champion

Ben Balvy (AVG) .444 (RBI) 18 (AB) 72 (R) 25 (H) 32 (2B) 4 (3B) 3 (HR) 1 (SLG) .625 (CANNON CLUB)

2015 Pitching Leader

Josh Desai 1.62 7 2 0 60.2 21 14 81 20 0 1.34 1.203 (ADSL)

2015 Category Leaders

Batting

AVG: Ben Balvy Hits: Chris Hoyt 2B: Tim Corey 3B: Jorge Deronimo HR: Alex Venditti RBI: Chris Johnson R: Derek Riddy BB: John Mccue SLG: Jorge Deronimo OBP: Frankie Tierney OPS: Ben Balvy SB: Ryan Connelly

Pitching

ERA: Josh Desai W: Josh Desai S: Jared Blandino IP: Tyler Shute SO: Josh Desai SOIP: Jarlin Gomez WHIP: Raymond Malagon
