= Jump Start (comic strip) =

Comic strip by Rob Armstrong

- Author: Robb Armstrong
- Website: syndication.andrewsmcmeel.com/comics/jumpstart
- Current status/schedule: Current daily strip
- Launch date: 1989
- Syndicate(s): United Feature Syndicate
- Genre: Humor

Jump Start is a daily comic strip drawn by cartoonist Robb Armstrong. It portrays the joys, trials, and tribulations of a young African American couple as they try to balance the demands of work and raising their young children.

Jump Start is set in the Philadelphia area, where Armstrong grew up. The strip is syndicated by United Feature Syndicate.

== Publication history ==
Armstrong attended Syracuse University, where in 1982 he created a popular comic strip in the student newspaper The Daily Orange, called Hector. The strip ran for four years, and its main characters were two young men and a glasses-wearing dog.

After having no success in attempting to syndicate Hector, Armstrong then transitioned it into Jump Start, which was designed to have a broader appeal than the earlier strip. Jump Start entered syndication in 1989.

== Story and characters ==
Jump Start's main characters are Joe and Marcy Cobb, and their children Sunny, Jojo and twins Tommi and Teddy. Police officer Joe's uniform hat is drawn with a keystone badge emblem, as many police departments in Pennsylvania use that emblem due to Pennsylvania being known as the "Keystone State".

Robb Armstrong set out to portray young black couples from his own experience. In Marcy and Joe, the reader sees an average middle class couple, busy with work and raising a family. Armstrong says, "The image of young blacks is so skewed, so false. I don't know anybody who's carjacking, playing basketball, rapping. Joe and Marcy and the characters I've developed are deep and based on real life." In all strips, adults use regular all caps type for their speech and thoughts, while children's speech and thought balloons are a mix of uppercase and lowercase lettering.

=== The Cobb family ===
- Joseph "Joe" Cobb Sr. is a father, loving husband and hard-working city police officer.
- Marcy Cobb (née Hart) is a fun-loving, young and caring mother, a loving wife and a busy and dedicated nurse.
- Sunny Cobb is the upbeat, intelligent daughter of Joe and Marcy. She is addicted to macaroni and cheese. She is a good big sister to Jojo, Tommi and Teddy but still knows how to use that older-sibling power.
- Joseph "Jojo" Latimer Cobb Jr. is a budding leader with an active imagination. Jojo makes it his business to cause the havoc expected of little brothers. He even considers his group of friends to be his "business partners" and acts as almost a CEO figure among his friends. His pursuits include campaigning for class president and being in a band with his friends called "Benny and the Jets", which he quit to go solo.
- Teddy & Tommi Cobb are the youngest children, fraternal twins. Not yet capable of speech with other characters but they completely understand each other.
- Mortimer was the former pet of Ray Ramsey, while he was in prison. He was taken in by the Cobbs; Joe gave Mortimer back to Ray when he was released and went straight, though it was clear the children were already attached to him. And it was clear that Mortimer felt the same. The first day Ray brought him home, he got out and ran back home to the Cobb family. Ray would let him stay and be the Cobbs' family pet. Mortimer is very protective of his family and Joe believes he's a good judge of character.

=== Recurring characters ===
- Dot Cobb is Joe's mother. Despite living with a family of police officers, she is a dangerous driver to the point where she can frighten even the most fearless individuals. Dot is a former English teacher, and is an extreme stickler when it comes to grammar, correcting anyone she meets who utters even a single grammatical error, much to their annoyance.
- Frank Cobb is Joe's father (referred to as "Pop-Pop" by his grandchildren). An ex-police officer, he now spends his time knowing everything about the comic strip "Klondike Ike" (perhaps based on the old Ozark Ike strip), but was reinstated as a police academy training officer.
- Edmund Crunchy is Joe Cobb's partner at the police department; despite the disparity in their ages, he and Joe get along and hang out outside of work. Grumpy and grouchy, he is nevertheless a good man and a dedicated police officer. He likes to appear to be hard boiled, but has a few soft spots, especially for his dog. Crunchy was Frank Cobb's old police partner. He is married to Captain Yolanda Ruiz. His full name was revealed in the October 8, 2005 strip.
- Maureen is Marcy's mother. A widow, she marries Clarence's father. Clayton came into her life around the same time as Romaire, a person she dated many years ago who seemed to want to restart their relationship.
- Benny is one of Jojo's friends from school. He is a follower to Jojo and is also a key member of their band. At one time Benny worked for and reported directly to Jojo, and was often seem perusing documents and putting in long hours "at the office."
- Clarence Glover is a good friend of Joe's. He is an orthodontist and a very bulky man with eleven brothers. Since his father has married Marcy's mother it makes him and Marcy step-siblings.
- Charlene Glover is Clarence's Caucasian wife, an automotive mechanic with a penchant for restoration.
- Olivet Maxine Glover is Clarence's and Charlene's youngest child. She was named after Charlene's late mother and she was born on her grandmother's birthday. Like the twins, she can not speak, but her thoughts are often shown.
- C. J. Glover who calls himself O'Sullivan is Clarence and Charlene's teenage son.
- Jasmine Glover is Clarence and Charlene's second child and first daughter.
- Clayton Glover is Clarence's father. A widower and a father of twelve, he amazes people that such a small, simple man was able to raise an entire pack of gigantic, successful men with little stress to show for it. He starts dating and soon marries Marcy's mother. A retired minister and a very humble, modest man, he refuses any luxurious gifts offered to him by his successful sons.
- Marcus Glover is Clarence's youngest brother, a professional football player – first for the Philadelphia Eagles and later the Los Angeles Chargers. Marcus is a notorious cheapskate who never spends any of his NFL salary.
- Otis Glover is the oldest Glover brother, a massive man at 8 feet tall.
- Romaire is a very wealthy man who used to date Maureen. He provided a little competition to Clayton for Maureen, but their relationship never picked up. He is still friends with Maureen and Clayton.
- Doctor Appleby is a boy who goes to school with Sunny and Jojo. He dresses like a doctor and can often be found treating various cuts and scrapes the kids from their school are afflicted with. His given first name is "Doctor", and he has been known to mention that his parents expect him to be a doctor.
- Dexter Wright is Sunny's best friend from school. They have known each other since being toddlers at day care. It's hinted he and Kenny have a crush on Sunny as they've fought over her attention on Valentine's day.
- Captain Yolanda Ruiz is in charge of Joe's police precinct and married to Crunchy.
- Ray Ramsey is a former criminal gone straight, who is Captain Ruiz's biological brother. He has become close friends with Joe, and his mother Sara is married to Crunchy's brother George. He now goes by Delray and marries Marcy's boss, Dana; they adopt Kenny Sharcane, son of a criminal who was sent to prison for stealing cars. After giving up Mortimer, he adopted a stray female dog named Marshmallow.
- Willarbee, Percival, and Cross: Dennis Willarbee, Percival Pollard, and Seymour Cross are three bullies who steal boys' lunch money from time to time.

== Jump Start books ==
- On a Roll!: A JumpStart Treasury (2020) ISBN 1-5248-6162-6.
- Twins – Twice the Fun (2008) ISBN 0-9798-1711-0. Twins Tommi and Teddy provide their outlook on life from inside the womb and through their first 90 days on planet Earth.
- Jump Start (1997) ISBN 0-8362-3661-0.
- Jump Start: A Love Story (1996) ISBN 0-06-095139-7. This collection includes original strips detailing how Joe and Marcy met.

== Memorable storylines ==
- The birth of Jojo
- The birth of Teddy and Tommi – This followed the thoughts of the twins while in the womb and the parents' struggle to name the twins. Tommi was very reluctant to leave the womb for the trials of the real world, and almost refused to be born.
- African History Month – Every February, the comic's theme is based on the characters talking about African History and often focuses on research about a famous African individual.
- Joe's shooting – Maureen has a strange feeling, and begs Joe to wear his bulletproof vest, despite the sweltering heat, for fear that something bad is going to happen. He reluctantly agrees, and sure enough during a routine traffic stop, while Crunchy is looking away, one of the suspects pulls a gun and shoots Joe in the chest. Joe survives thanks to his vest.
- Frank's heart attack – Frank has a heart attack while on the roof of his house. He ends up in a coma and, having an out-of-body experience, sees his life flash before his eyes. It is revealed here that Frank's father served and was killed in World War II.
- Maureen and Clayton's relationship – Marcy and Clarence decide to set their parents up on a date, and they fall in love. Their children try to help them along in their relationship, but they reject their children's advice, especially Clayton, who prefers simple methods such as fishing and picnics. Soon, Maureen's ex Romaire comes into the picture, and they start seeing each other socially. Clarence is baffled why Clayton is doing nothing about the fact an extremely rich ex-boyfriend is threatening to come between him and Maureen, but it is such examples of Clayton's modesty and lack of jealousy that eventually win Maureen's heart.
- Joe's second shooting – A homeless family, the Nelsons, approaches Joe and presents him with a medallion in gratitude for the Cobb family's efforts to feed the needy. On a subsequent stakeout, Joe is shot, but the bullet strikes the medallion and Joe's life is spared. Joe attempts to find the Nelsons to thank them, but no trace of the family can be found, prompting Joe to suspect that they may have been angels sent to protect him. In 2017 it was revealed that "the Nelsons" were actually Ray Ramsey and his mother Sara.
- The Birth of Olivet Maxine Glover
- Joe and Marcy go to Africa – Joe and Marcy take a vacation to Africa.

== Television series ==
In November 2014, 20th Century Fox and Aaron Kaplan's Kapital Entertainment announced a project to develop a live-action television series based on Jump Start. Robb Armstrong, Andrew Orenstein and Kaplan were to co-write and serve as the executive producers of the series along with Armstrong's producer Bridget McMeel of Amuse Entertainment.

In June 2022, CBS had put in development a television adaptation of Jump Start and Wayne Conley will write. In February 2023, CBS ordered the pilot. In March 2023, it was announced that Terry Crews would portray Joe Cobb and that Phill Lewis would direct and executive produce the pilot.
