= 2005 Boston Red Sox season =

Major League Baseball season

2005 Boston Red Sox
- American League Wild Card winners
- League: American League
- Division: East
- Ballpark: Fenway Park
- City: Boston
- Record: 95–67 (.586)
- Divisional place: 2nd
- Owners: John W. Henry (New England Sports Ventures)
- President: Larry Lucchino
- General manager: Theo Epstein
- Manager: Terry Francona
- Television: WSBK-TV; NESN (Don Orsillo, Jerry Remy)
- Radio: WEEI (Jerry Trupiano, Joe Castiglione); WROL (Bill Kulik, Uri Berenguer, Juan Báez)
- Stats: ESPN.com; Baseball Reference

The 2005 Boston Red Sox season was the 105th season in the franchise's Major League Baseball history. The Red Sox finished second in the American League East with a record of 95–67, the same record as the New York Yankees. The Yankees were deemed the division winner, due to their 10–9 head-to-head record against the Red Sox during the regular season. The Red Sox qualified for the postseason as the AL wild card, but were swept by the American League Central (and eventual World Series champion Chicago White Sox) in the ALDS.

On offense, the Red Sox led Major League Baseball in runs scored (910), hits (1,579), doubles (339), RBI (863), walks (653), batting average (.281), OBP (.357), OPS (.811) and sacrifice flies (63). Red Sox pitchers hit opposing batters with 89 pitches, the most by any major league pitching staff in 2005.

== Offseason ==
The Red Sox made a few notable offseason moves coming off their 2004 World Series championship. The team brought back Jason Varitek by re-signing the veteran catcher to a 4-year $40 million deal. Outfielder Dave Roberts – who played a key role as a base stealer during the 2004 postseason – was traded to the Padres in exchange for shortstop Ramon Vazquez and left fielder Jay Payton.

Management sought to fill the void left by Orlando Cabrera and Pokey Reese at shortstop by signing free agent Édgar Rentería to a 4-year $40 million year with a 5th year option. The move sat well with fans because Rentería was coming off a very successful 2004 campaign with the St. Louis Cardinals. Rentería hit .287 with 10 home runs and 72 RBI in 2004.

The Red Sox front office looked to bolster their starting pitching by signing two veteran pitchers. The need for starting pitching was a point of emphasize due to the departure of Pedro Martínez to the New York Mets after 7 years in a Red Sox uniform. The first pitcher signed was former Padres starter David Wells. Wells was coming off a surprising 2004 season with the Padres in which he posted a 3.73 ERA over 195 innings pitched at the age of 41. The second pitcher signed was former Cubs starter Matt Clement. Clement was coming off a season in which he posted a respectable 3.68 ERA over 181 innings pitched.

== Spring training ==
| Boston Win | Boston Loss |

2005 Boston Red Sox Spring Training Log
March

| # | Date | Opponent | Score | Win | Loss | Record | Source |
|---|---|---|---|---|---|---|---|
| 1 | March 3 | Twins | 4─3 | González (1─0) | Durbin (0─1) | 1─0 | |
| 2 | March 4 | Northeastern Huskies | 17─0 | Wakefield | Pellegrine | 2─0 | |
| 3 | March 4 | Boston College | 11─5 | Timlin | Jeanes | 3─0 | |

== Regular season ==
=== Season standings ===
AL East
| Team | W | L | Pct. | GB | Home | Road |
|---|---|---|---|---|---|---|
| New York Yankees | 95 | 67 | .586 | — | 53‍–‍28 | 42‍–‍39 |
| Boston Red Sox | 95 | 67 | .586 | — | 54‍–‍27 | 41‍–‍40 |
| Toronto Blue Jays | 80 | 82 | .494 | 15 | 43‍–‍38 | 37‍–‍44 |
| Baltimore Orioles | 74 | 88 | .457 | 21 | 36‍–‍45 | 38‍–‍43 |
| Tampa Bay Devil Rays | 67 | 95 | .414 | 28 | 40‍–‍41 | 27‍–‍54 |

=== Record vs. opponents ===
2005 American League record Source: MLB Standings Grid – 2005
| Team | BAL | BOS | CWS | CLE | DET | KC | LAA | MIN | NYY | OAK | SEA | TB | TEX | TOR | NL |
|---|---|---|---|---|---|---|---|---|---|---|---|---|---|---|---|
| Baltimore | — | 8–10 | 2–6 | 1–6 | 3–5 | 4–2 | 2–4 | 3–3 | 7–11 | 4–6 | 7–3 | 12–6 | 4–6 | 9–10 | 8–10 |
| Boston | 10–8 | — | 4–3 | 4–2 | 6–4 | 4–2 | 6–4 | 4–2 | 9–10 | 6–4 | 3–3 | 13–6 | 7–2 | 7–11 | 12–6 |
| Chicago | 6–2 | 3–4 | — | 14–5 | 14–5 | 13–5 | 4–6 | 11–7 | 3–3 | 2–7 | 6–3 | 4–2 | 3–6 | 4–2 | 12–6 |
| Cleveland | 6–1 | 2–4 | 5–14 | — | 12–6 | 13–6 | 3–5 | 10–9 | 3–4 | 6–3 | 7–3 | 4–6 | 3–3 | 4–2 | 15–3 |
| Detroit | 5–3 | 4–6 | 5–14 | 6–12 | — | 10–9 | 4–6 | 8–11 | 1–5 | 1–5 | 5–4 | 5–2 | 4–2 | 4–3 | 9–9 |
| Kansas City | 2–4 | 2–4 | 5–13 | 6–13 | 9–10 | — | 2–7 | 6–13 | 3–3 | 2–4 | 2–7 | 3–5 | 2–8 | 3–6 | 9–9 |
| Los Angeles | 4–2 | 4–6 | 6–4 | 5–3 | 6–4 | 7–2 | — | 6–4 | 6–4 | 10–9 | 9–9 | 4–5 | 15–4 | 1–5 | 12–6 |
| Minnesota | 3–3 | 2–4 | 7–11 | 9–10 | 11–8 | 13–6 | 4–6 | — | 3–3 | 4–6 | 6–4 | 6–0 | 3–6 | 4–2 | 8–10 |
| New York | 11–7 | 10–9 | 3–3 | 4–3 | 5–1 | 3–3 | 4–6 | 3–3 | — | 7–2 | 7–3 | 8–11 | 7–3 | 12–6 | 11–7 |
| Oakland | 6–4 | 4–6 | 7–2 | 3–6 | 5–1 | 4–2 | 9–10 | 6–4 | 2–7 | — | 12–6 | 4–5 | 11–8 | 5–5 | 10–8 |
| Seattle | 3–7 | 3–3 | 3–6 | 3–7 | 4–5 | 7–2 | 9–9 | 4–6 | 3–7 | 6–12 | — | 4–2 | 6–13 | 4–6 | 10–8 |
| Tampa Bay | 6–12 | 6–13 | 2–4 | 6–4 | 2–5 | 5–3 | 5–4 | 0–6 | 11–8 | 5–4 | 2–4 | — | 6–2 | 8–11 | 3–15 |
| Texas | 6–4 | 2–7 | 6–3 | 3–3 | 2–4 | 8–2 | 4–15 | 6–3 | 3–7 | 8–11 | 13–6 | 2–6 | — | 7–3 | 9–9 |
| Toronto | 10–9 | 11–7 | 2–4 | 2–4 | 3–4 | 6–3 | 5–1 | 2–4 | 6–12 | 5–5 | 6–4 | 11–8 | 3–7 | — | 8–10 |

Red Sox vs. National League
| Team | NL Central | | | | | | | |
| Team | CHC | CIN | HOU | MIL | PIT | STL | ATL | PHI |
|---|---|---|---|---|---|---|---|---|
| Boston | 1–2 | 3–0 | — | — | 2–1 | 1–2 | 2–1 | 3–0 |

=== Notable transactions ===
- December 17, 2004: David Wells and John Halama were signed as free agents with the Red Sox.
- December 19, 2004: Édgar Rentería was signed as a free agent with the Red Sox.
- December 20, 2004: Jay Payton, Ramón Vázquez and David Pauley were acquired by the Red Sox from the Padres in exchange for Dave Roberts.
- December 22, 2004: Matt Clement and Wade Miller were signed as free agents with the Red Sox.
- January 11, 2005: David McCarty was signed as a free agent with the Red Sox.
- May 2, 2005: David McCarty was released by the Red Sox and granted free agency.
- May 2, 2005: John Olerud was signed as a free agent with the Boston Red Sox.
- June 7, 2005: Jacoby Ellsbury was drafted by the Boston Red Sox in the 1st round (23rd pick) of the 2005 amateur draft. Player signed July 1, 2005.
- June 7, 2005: Clay Buchholz was drafted by the Boston Red Sox in the 1st round (42nd pick) of the 2005 amateur draft. Player signed June 23, 2005.
- July 7: 2005: Alex Cora was acquired by the Red Sox from the Indians in exchange for Ramón Vázquez.
- July 13, 2005: Chad Bradford was acquired by the Red Sox from the Athletics in exchange for Jay Payton.
- July 19, 2005: Alan Embree was released by the Red Sox.
- July 19, 2005: Tony Graffanino was acquired by the Red Sox from the Royals in exchange for Chip Ambres and minor leaguer Juan Cedeño.
- July 26, 2005: John Halama was released by the Red Sox.
- August 9, 2005: Ricky Bottalico was signed as a free agent with the Boston Red Sox.
- August 9, 2005: Mike Remlinger and cash were acquired by the Red Sox from the Cubs in exchange for minor league pitcher Olivo Astacio.
- August 19, 2005: Mark Bellhorn was released by the Red Sox.
- August 25, 2005: Ricky Bottalico was released by the Red Sox.
- August 28, 2005: Mike Remlinger was released by the Red Sox.

=== Opening Day lineup ===
| 18 | Johnny Damon | CF |
| 16 | Édgar Rentería | SS |
| 24 | Manny Ramirez | LF |
| 34 | David Ortiz | DH |
| 15 | Kevin Millar | 1B |
| 33 | Jason Varitek | C |
| 44 | Jay Payton | RF |
| 11 | Bill Mueller | 3B |
| 12 | Mark Bellhorn | 2B |
| 3 | David Wells | P |

=== Roster ===
2005 Boston Red Sox
Roster
| Pitchers: 59 Abe Alvarez; 61 Bronson Arroyo; 53 Chad Bradford; 57 Scott Cassidy; 30 Matt Clement; 57 Manny Delcarmen; 55 Lenny DiNardo; 43 Alan Embree; 29 Keith Foulke; 32,54 Geremi González; 54 John Halama; 56 Craig Hansen; 43 Chad Harville; 31 Matt Mantei; 51 Cla Meredith; 52 Wade Miller; 36 Mike Myers; 59 Blaine Neal; 58 Jonathan Papelbon; 46 Matt Perisho; 37 Mike Remlinger; 38 Curt Schilling; 37 Mike Stanton; 50 Mike Timlin; 49 Tim Wakefield; 3,16 David Wells | Catchers: 28 Doug Mirabelli; 48 Kelly Shoppach; 33 Jason Varitek; 10 Shawn Wooten; Infielders: 12 Mark Bellhorn; 23 Alex Cora; 10 Tony Graffanino; 40 Alejandro Machado; 10 David McCarty; 15 Kevin Millar; 11 Bill Mueller; 19 John Olerud; 13 Roberto Petagine; 60 Hanley Ramírez; 16,3 Édgar Rentería; 23 Ramón Vázquez; 20 Kevin Youkilis | Outfielders: 32 José Cruz Jr.; 18 Johnny Damon; 25 Adam Hyzdu; 44 Gabe Kapler; 7 Trot Nixon; 44 Jay Payton; 24 Manny Ramírez; 39 Adam Stern; Designated hitter: 34 David Ortiz | Manager: 47 Terry Francona; Coaches: 44 Bill Haselman (Bullpen); 22 Ron Jackson (Hitting); 35 Lynn Jones (First base); 2 Brad Mills (Bench); 41 Dale Sveum (Third base); 17 Dave Wallace (Pitching) |

=== Game log ===
2005 game log
April (12–11)

| # | Date | Opponent | Score | Win | Loss | Save | Attendance | Record |
|---|---|---|---|---|---|---|---|---|
| 1 | April 3 | @ Yankees | 9–2 | Johnson (1–0) | Wells (0–1) | — | 54,818 | 0–1 |
| 2 | April 5 | @ Yankees | 4–3 | Rivera (1–0) | Foulke (0–1) | — | 54,690 | 0–2 |
| 3 | April 6 | @ Yankees | 7–3 | Timlin (1–0) | Rivera (1–1) | — | 55,165 | 1–2 |
| 4 | April 8 | @ Blue Jays | 6–5 | Arroyo (1–0) | Bush (0–1) | Foulke (1) | 50,560 | 2–2 |
| 5 | April 9 | @ Blue Jays | 12–5 | Frasor (1–0) | Wells (0–2) | — | 28,765 | 2–3 |
| 6 | April 10 | @ Blue Jays | 4–3 | Batista (1–0) | Timlin (1–1) | — | 22,845 | 2–4 |
| 7 | April 11 | Yankees | 8–1 | Wakefield (1–0) | Mussina (0–1) | — | 33,702 | 3–4 |
| 8 | April 13 | Yankees | 5–2 | Wright (1–1) | Schilling (0–1) | Rivera (2) | 35,115 | 3–5 |
| 9 | April 14 | Yankees | 8–5 | Foulke (1–1) | Gordon (0–1) | — | 35,251 | 4–5 |
| 10 | April 15 | Devil Rays | 10–0 | Wells (1–2) | Nomo (1–1) | — | 35,023 | 5–5 |
| 11 | April 16 | Devil Rays | 6–2 | Clement (1–0) | Brazelton (0–3) | — | 35,106 | 6–5 |
| 12 | April 17 | Devil Rays | 3–1 | Wakefield (2–0) | Kazmir (0–1) | Foulke (2) | 35,232 | 7–5 |
| 13 | April 18 | Blue Jays | 12–7 | Schilling (1–1) | Bush (0–2) | — | 35,243 | 8–5 |
| 14 | April 19 | Blue Jays | 4–3 | Halladay (3–0) | Foulke (1–2) | Batista (4) | 35,598 | 8–6 |
| 15 | April 20 | @ Orioles | 8–0 | Wells (2–2) | Chen (1–1) | — | 36,478 | 9–6 |
| 16 | April 21 | @ Orioles | 1–0 | Clement (2–0) | López (2–1) | Foulke (3) | 40,419 | 10–6 |
| 17 | April 22 | @ Devil Rays | 5–4 | Báez (3–0) | Embree (0–1) | — | 30,530 | 10–7 |
| 18 | April 23 | @ Devil Rays | 6–5 | Fossum (1–1) | Schilling (1–2) | Carter (1) | 33,220 | 10–8 |
| 19 | April 24 | @ Devil Rays | 11–3 | Arroyo (2–0) | Nomo (2–2) | — | 30,236 | 11–8 |
| 20 | April 25 | Orioles | 8–4 | Chen (2–1) | Wells (2–3) | — | 35,003 | 11–9 |
| 21 | April 26 | Orioles | 11–8 | Julio (1–0) | Foulke (1–3) | Ryan (3) | 35,670 | 11–10 |
| – | April 27 | Orioles | Postponed (rain) Rescheduled for June 2 | | | | | |
| 22 | April 29 | @ Rangers | 7–2 | Park (3–1) | Wakefield (2–1) | Mahay (1) | 43,933 | 11–11 |
| 23 | April 30 | @ Rangers | 9–2 | Arroyo (3–0) | Astacio (1–3) | — | 44,114 | 12–11 |

May (16–12)

| # | Date | Opponent | Score | Win | Loss | Save | Attendance | Record |
|---|---|---|---|---|---|---|---|---|
| 24 | May 1 | @ Rangers | 6–5 | Clement (3–0) | Drese (2–3) | Foulke (4) | 49,342 | 13–11 |
| 25 | May 2 | @ Tigers | 8–3 | Bonderman (4–2) | Neal (0–1) | Urbina (1) | 17,497 | 13–12 |
| 26 | May 3 | @ Tigers | 5–3 | Halama (1–0) | Maroth (2–2) | Foulke (5) | 19,121 | 14–12 |
| 27 | May 4 | @ Tigers | 4–3 | Wakefield (3–1) | Farnsworth (1–1) | Foulke (6) | 23,295 | 15–12 |
| 28 | May 5 | @ Tigers | 2–1 | Arroyo (4–0) | Urbina (0–3) | Foulke (7) | 24,870 | 16–12 |
| 29 | May 6 | Mariners | 7–2 | Clement (4–0) | Moyer (4–1) | — | 35,229 | 17–12 |
| – | May 7 | Mariners | Postponed (rain) Rescheduled for May 8 | | | | | |
| 30 | May 8 | Mariners | 6–3 | González (1–0) | Piñeiro (2–3) | Foulke (8) | 34,848 | 18–12 |
| 31 | May 8 | Mariners | 6–4 | Franklin (2–4) | Halama (1–1) | Guardado (9) | 34,671 | 18–13 |
| 32 | May 9 | Athletics | 13–5 | Wakefield (4–1) | Haren (1–5) | — | 35,000 | 19–13 |
| 33 | May 10 | Athletics | 3–2 | Matt Mantei (1–0) | Dotel (1–1) | — | 35,644 | 20–13 |
| 34 | May 11 | Athletics | 6–5 | Foulke (2–3) | Dotel (1–2) | — | 35,375 | 21–13 |
| 35 | May 13 | @ Mariners | 14–7 | Mateo (1–0) | González (1–1) | — | 44,534 | 21–14 |
| 36 | May 14 | @ Mariners | 6–3 | Myers (1–0) | Villone (0–2) | Foulke (9) | 46,229 | 22–14 |
| 37 | May 15 | @ Mariners | 5–4 | Meche (3–2) | Wakefield | Guardado (10) | 46,145 | 22–15 |
| 38 | May 16 | @ Athletics | 6–4 | Yabu (3–0) | Myers (1–1) | Dotel (7) | 30,281 | 22–16 |
| 39 | May 17 | @ Athletics | 7–5 | Embree (1–1) | Cruz (0–2) | Foulke (10) | 29,494 | 23–16 |
| 40 | May 18 | @ Athletics | 13–6 | Etherton (1–0) | Wells (2–4) | — | 42,705 | 23–17 |
| 41 | May 20 | Braves | 4–3 | Miller (1–0) | Hudson (4–3) | Foulke (11) | 35,332 | 24–17 |
| 42 | May 21 | Braves | 7–5 | Davies (1–0) | Wakefield (4–3) | — | 35,008 | 24–18 |
| 43 | May 22 | Braves | 5–2 | Clement (5–0) | Colón (0–1) | — | 34,844 | 25–18 |
| 44 | May 24 | @ Blue Jays | 9–6 | Batista (3–0) | Embree (1–2) | — | 34,280 | 25–19 |
| 45 | May 25 | @ Blue Jays | 6–1 | Lilly (3–4) | Arroyo (4–1) | — | 23,221 | 25–20 |
| 46 | May 26 | @ Blue Jays | 8–1 | Chacín (5–3) | Miller (1–1) | Walker (2) | 26,255 | 25–21 |
| 47 | May 27 | @ Yankees | 6–3 | Johnson (5–3) | Wakefield (4–4) | Rivera (12) | 55,051 | 25–22 |
| 48 | May 28 | @ Yankees | 17–1 | Clement (6–0) | Pavano (4–3) | — | 55,315 | 26–22 |
| 49 | May 29 | @ Yankees | 7–2 | Wells (3–4) | Mussina (5–3) | — | 55,235 | 27–22 |
| 50 | May 30 | Orioles | 8–1 | Lopez (4–2) | Arroyo (4–2) | — | 35,483 | 27–23 |
| 51 | May 31 | Orioles | 5–1 | Miller (2–1) | Cabrera (4–4) | — | 35,147 | 28–23 |

June (17–9)

| # | Date | Opponent | Score | Win | Loss | Save | Attendance | Record |
|---|---|---|---|---|---|---|---|---|
| 52 | June 1 | Orioles | 9–3 | Ponson (6–3) | Wakefield (4–5) | — | 35,527 | 28–24 |
| 53 | June 2 | Orioles | 6–4 | Foulke (3–3) | Ryan (0–1) | — | 35,138 | 29–24 |
| 54 | June 3 | Angels | 7–4 | Myers (2–1) | Shields (4–3) | Foulke (12) | 35,328 | 30–24 |
| 55 | June 4 | Angels | 13–6 | Colón (7–3) | Embree (1–3) | — | 34,754 | 30–25 |
| 56 | June 5 | Angels | 6–3 | Myers (3–1) | Woods (1–1) | Foulke (13) | 35,008 | 31–25 |
| 57 | June 6 | @ Cardinals | 7–1 | Morris (7–0) | Wakefield (4–6) | — | 50,270 | 31–26 |
| 58 | June 7 | @ Cardinals | 9–2 | Suppan (5–5) | Clement (6–1) | — | 47,496 | 31–27 |
| 59 | June 8 | @ Cardinals | 4–0 | Wells (4–4) | Carpenter (8–4) | — | 46,928 | 32–27 |
| 60 | June 10 | @ Cubs | 14–6 | Maddux (5–3) | Arroyo (4–3) | — | 39,215 | 32–28 |
| 61 | June 11 | @ Cubs | 7–6 | Wellemeyer (2–1) | Miller (2–2) | Dempster (8) | 39,096 | 32–29 |
| 62 | June 12 | @ Cubs | 8–1 | Wakefield (5–6) | Rusch (5–2) | — | 39,138 | 33–29 |
| 63 | June 13 | Reds | 10–3 | Clement (7–1) | Milton (3–8) | — | 35,478 | 34–29 |
| 64 | June 14 | Reds | 7–0 | Wells (5–4) | Hudson (1–1) | — | 35,387 | 35–29 |
| 65 | June 15 | Reds | 6–1 | Arroyo (5–3) | Harang (4–5) | — | 35,265 | 36–29 |
| 66 | June 17 | Pirates | 6–5 | Foulke (4–3) | White (2–3) | — | 35,377 | 37–29 |
| 67 | June 18 | Pirates | 2–0 | White (3–3) | Embree (1–4) | Mesa (18) | 35,216 | 37–30 |
| 68 | June 19 | Pirates | 8–0 | Clement (8–1) | Wells (5–6) | — | 35,046 | 38–30 |
| 69 | June 20 | @ Indians | 10–9 | Wells (6–4) | Sabathia (5–4) | Foulke (14) | 30,562 | 39–30 |
| 70 | June 21 | @ Indians | 9–2 | Arroyo (6–3) | Millwood (2–5) | — | 28,450 | 40–30 |
| 71 | June 22 | @ Indians | 5–4 | Foulke (5–3) | Wickman (0–2) | — | 29,915 | 41–30 |
| 72 | June 24 | @ Phillies | 8–0 | Wakefield (6–6) | Lieber (8–7) | — | 45,090 | 42–30 |
| 73 | June 25 | @ Phillies | 7–1 | Clement (9–1) | Padilla (3–7) | — | 44,868 | 43–30 |
| 74 | June 26 | @ Phillies | 12–8 | Timlin (2–1) | Cormier (2–2) | — | 45,042 | 44–30 |
| 75 | June 27 | Indians | 7–0 | Millwood (3–5) | Arroyo (6–4) | — | 35,458 | 44–31 |
| 76 | June 28 | Indians | 12–8 | Miller (1–0) | Foulke (5–4) | — | 35,445 | 44–32 |
| 77 | June 29 | Indians | 5–2 | Wakefield (7–6) | Elarton (4–3) | Timlin (1) | 35,069 | 45–32 |

July (14–13)

| # | Date | Opponent | Score | Win | Loss | Save | Attendance | Record |
|---|---|---|---|---|---|---|---|---|
| 78 | July 1 | Blue Jays | 15–2 | Lilly (6–8) | Clement (9–2) | — | 35,302 | 45–33 |
| 79 | July 2 | Blue Jays | 6–4 | Timlin (3–1) | Walker (3–2) | Foulke (15) | 35,268 | 46–33 |
| 80 | July 3 | Blue Jays | 5–2 | Halladay (12–4) | Arroyo (6–5) | Schoeneweis (1) | 34,794 | 46–34 |
| 81 | July 4 | @ Rangers | 6–5 | Benoit (1–0) | Foulke (5–5) | — | 50,492 | 46–35 |
| 82 | July 5 | @ Rangers | 7–4 | Wakefield (8–6) | Young (8–5) | Timlin (2) | 33,356 | 47–35 |
| 83 | July 6 | @ Rangers | 7–4 | Clement (10–2) | Park (8–3) | Embree (1) | 34,962 | 48–35 |
| 84 | July 7 | @ Orioles | 3–1 | Cabrera (7–7) | Wells (6–5) | Byrdak (1) | 47,389 | 48–36 |
| 85 | July 8 | @ Orioles | 7–2 | Arroyo (7–5) | Ponson (7–7) | — | 49,174 | 49–36 |
| 86 | July 9 | @ Orioles | 9–1 | Chen (7–5) | Miller (2–3) | — | 49,331 | 49–37 |
| 87 | July 10 | @ Orioles | 4–1 | Lopez (8–5) | Wakefield (8–7) | Ryan (19) | 49,828 | 49–38 |
| 88 | July 14 | Yankees | 8–6 | Gordon (3–3) | Schilling (1–3) | Rivera (21) | 35,232 | 49–39 |
| 89 | July 15 | Yankees | 17–1 | Wells (7–5) | Redding (0–6) | — | 35,083 | 50–39 |
| 90 | July 16 | Yankees | 7–4 | Johnson (10–6) | Clement (10–3) | Rivera (22) | 34,694 | 50–40 |
| 91 | July 17 | Yankees | 5–3 | Leiter (4–7) | Wakefield (8–8) | Rivera (23) | 34,802 | 50–41 |
| 92 | July 18 | Devil Rays | 3–1 | Kazmir (4–7) | Miller (2–4) | Báez (17) | 35,405 | 50–42 |
| 93 | July 19 | Devil Rays | 5–2 | Arroyo (8–5) | Fossum (4–8) | Schilling (1) | 35,428 | 51–42 |
| 94 | July 20 | Devil Rays | 9–4 | Wells (8–5) | Hendrickson (4–7) | — | 35,123 | 52–42 |
| 95 | July 21 | @ White Sox | 6–5 | Schilling (2–3) | Vizcaíno (4–4) | — | 36,784 | 53–42 |
| 96 | July 22 | @ White Sox | 8–4 | Garland (15–4) | Wakefield (8–9) | — | 37,511 | 53–43 |
| 97 | July 23 | @ White Sox | 3–0 | Miller (3–4) | Hernández (7–3) | Schilling (2) | 39,408 | 54–43 |
| 98 | July 24 | @ White Sox | 6–4 | Contreras (6–6) | Arroyo (8–6) | Hermanson (23) | 37,168 | 54–44 |
| 99 | July 25 | @ Devil Rays | 4–3 | Colomé (2–2) | Schilling (2–4) | — | 21,550 | 54–45 |
| 100 | July 26 | @ Devil Rays | 10–9 | Schilling (3–4) | Báez (5–3) | — | 24,029 | 55–45 |
| 101 | July 27 | @ Devil Rays | 4–1 | Wakefield (9–9) | McClung (1–6) | Schilling (3) | 22,079 | 56–45 |
| 102 | July 29 | Twins | 8–5 | Arroyo (9–6) | Silva (7–5) | Schilling (4) | 35,211 | 57–45 |
| 103 | July 30 | Twins | 6–2 | Wells (9–5) | Lohse (7–10) | — | 35,167 | 58–45 |
| 104 | July 31 | Twins | 4–3 | Timlin (4–1) | Rincón (4–4) | Schilling (5) | 34,929 | 59–45 |

August (18–9)

| # | Date | Opponent | Score | Win | Loss | Save | Attendance | Record |
|---|---|---|---|---|---|---|---|---|
| 105 | August 2 | Royals | 6–4 | Wakefield (10–9) | Burgos (1–4) | Schilling (6) | 35,386 | 60–45 |
| 106 | August 3 | Royals | 8–5 | Miller (4–4) | Snyder | Schilling (7) | 35,055 | 61–45 |
| 107 | August 4 | Royals | 11–9 | Clement (11–3) | Núñez (2–2) | Schilling (8) | 35,060 | 62–45 |
| 108 | August 5 | @ Twins | 12–0 | Radke (7–10) | Arroyo (9–7) | — | 38,161 | 62–46 |
| 109 | August 6 | @ Twins | 4–3 | Nathan (4–3) | Timlin (4–2) | — | 40,626 | 62–47 |
| 110 | August 7 | @ Twins | 11–7 | Wakefield (11–9) | Mays (5–7) | Schilling (9) | 40,982 | 63–47 |
| 111 | August 8 | Rangers | 11–6 | González (2–1) | Karsay (0–1) | — | 35,453 | 64–47 |
| 112 | August 9 | Rangers | 8–7 | Schilling (4–4) | Gryboski (1–1) | — | 35,308 | 65–47 |
| 113 | August 10 | Rangers | 16–5 | Arroyo (10–7) | Rogers (11–5) | — | 35,379 | 66–47 |
| 114 | August 12 | White Sox | 9–8 | Bradford (1–0) | Buehrle (13–5) | — | 35,132 | 67–47 |
| 115 | August 13 | White Sox | 7–4 | Wakefield (12–9) | Garland (16–6) | — | 35,055 | 68–47 |
| – | August 14 | White Sox | Postponed (rain) Rescheduled for September 5 | | | | | |
| 116 | August 15 | @ Tigers | 7–6 | Walker (4–3) | Schilling (4–5) | — | 30,426 | 68–48 |
| 117 | August 16 | @ Tigers | 10–7 | Bradford (2–0) | Dingman (1–2) | — | 32,129 | 69–48 |
| 118 | August 17 | @ Tigers | 6–5 | Bonderman (14–9) | Wells (9–6) | Rodney (5) | 30,634 | 69–49 |
| 119 | August 18 | @ Angels | 13–4 | Colón (16–6) | Wakefield (12–10) | — | 44,050 | 69–50 |
| 120 | August 19 | @ Angels | 4–3 | Schilling (5–5) | Shields (8–9) | — | 43,896 | 70–50 |
| 121 | August 20 | @ Angels | 4–2 | Santana (7–5) | Arroyo (10–8) | Rodríguez (28) | 44,014 | 70–51 |
| 122 | August 21 | @ Angels | 5–1 | Timlin (5–2) | Byrd (9–8) | — | 44,022 | 71–51 |
| 123 | August 23 | @ Royals | 5–2 | Wells (10–6) | Greinke (3–15) | — | 21,323 | 72–51 |
| 124 | August 24 | @ Royals | 4–3 | Sisco (2–2) | Arroyo (10–9) | — | 18,871 | 72–52 |
| 125 | August 25 | @ Royals | 7–4 | Lima (5–12) | Schilling (5–6) | MacDougal (17) | 21,815 | 72–53 |
| 126 | August 26 | Tigers | 9–8 | Wakefield (13–10) | Johnson (7–10) | Timlin (3) | 35,056 | 73–53 |
| 127 | August 27 | Tigers | 12–8 | Colón (2–5) | Papelbon (0–1) | — | 35,228 | 73–54 |
| 128 | August 28 | Tigers | 11–3 | Wells (11–6) | Robertson (6–11) | — | 34,658 | 74–54 |
| 129 | August 29 | Devil Rays | 10–6 | Clement (12–3) | McClung (5–8) | — | 35,007 | 75–54 |
| 130 | August 30 | Devil Rays | 7–6 | Timlin (6–2) | Borowski (1–1) | — | 35,101 | 76–54 |
| 131 | August 31 | Devil Rays | 7–6 | Wakefield (14–10) | Fossum (8–11) | Timlin (4) | 35,253 | 77–54 |

September (17–12)

| # | Date | Opponent | Score | Win | Loss | Save | Attendance | Record |
|---|---|---|---|---|---|---|---|---|
| 132 | September 1 | Devil Rays | 7–4 | Arroyo (11–9) | Waechter (5–9) | Timlin (5) | 35,337 | 78–54 |
| 133 | September 2 | Orioles | 7–3 | Maine (2–1) | DiNardo (0–1) | — | 35,156 | 78–55 |
| 134 | September 3 | Orioles | 7–6 | Clement (13–3) | Bédard (6–6) | Timlin (6) | 35,142 | 79–55 |
| 135 | September 4 | Orioles | 5–1 | Wells (12–6) | Lopez (13–9) | — | 35,003 | 80–55 |
| 136 | September 5 | White Sox | 5–3 | McCarthy (2–1) | Schilling (5–7) | — | 35,673 | 80–56 |
| 137 | September 6 | Angels | 3–2 | Wakefield (15–10) | Shields (8–11) | — | 35,061 | 81–56 |
| 138 | September 7 | Angels | 6–3 | Arroyo (12–9) | Santana (8–7) | Timlin (7) | 35,423 | 82–56 |
| 139 | September 8 | Angels | 3–0 | Byrd (11–9) | Clement (13–4) | Rodríguez (35) | 35,351 | 82–57 |
| 140 | September 9 | @ Yankees | 8–4 | Small (7–0) | Wells (12–7) | — | 55,024 | 82–58 |
| 141 | September 10 | @ Yankees | 9–2 | Schilling (6–7) | Chacón (5–10) | — | 55,076 | 83–58 |
| 142 | September 11 | @ Yankees | 1–0 | Johnson (14–8) | Wakefield (15–11) | Rivera (37) | 55,123 | 83–59 |
| 143 | September 12 | @ Blue Jays | 6–5 | Papelbon (1–1) | Walker (6–5) | — | 24,617 | 84–59 |
| 144 | September 13 | @ Blue Jays | 9–3 | Downs (3–3) | Clement (13–5) | — | 25,253 | 84–60 |
| 145 | September 14 | @ Blue Jays | 1–0 | Wells (13–7) | Towers (11–11) | Timlin (8) | 25,865 | 85–60 |
| 146 | September 15 | Athletics | 6–2 | Blanton (10–11) | Schilling (6–8) | — | 35,079 | 85–61 |
| 147 | September 16 | Athletics | 3–2 | Timlin (7–2) | Cruz (0–3) | — | 35,249 | 86–61 |
| 148 | September 17 | Athletics | 2–1 | Arroyo (13–9) | Haren (13–11) | Timlin (9) | 35,220 | 87–61 |
| 149 | September 18 | Athletics | 12–3 | Saarloos (10–7) | Clement (13–6) | — | 34,849 | 87–62 |
| 150 | September 19 | @ Devil Rays | 8–7 | Hendrickson (10–7) | Harville (0–3) | Báez (38) | 16,124 | 87–63 |
| 151 | September 20 | @ Devil Rays | 15–2 | Schilling (7–8) | McClung (6–11) | — | 18,723 | 88–63 |
| 152 | September 21 | @ Devil Rays | 7–4 | Miller (2–2) | Timlin (7–3) | Báez (39) | 20,002 | 88–64 |
| 153 | September 23 | @ Orioles | 6–3 | Arroyo (14–9) | Cabrera (10–12) | Timlin (10) | 46,850 | 89–64 |
| 154 | September 24 | @ Orioles | 4–3 | Papelbon (2–1) | Ryan (1–4) | Timlin (11) | 48,612 | 90–64 |
| 155 | September 25 | @ Orioles | 9–3 | Wells (14–7) | Maine (2–3) | — | 46,559 | 91–64 |
| – | September 26 | Blue Jays | Postponed (rain) Rescheduled for September 27 | | | | | |
| 156 | September 27 | Blue Jays | 3–1 | Wakefield (16–11) | Bush (5–11) | Timlin (12) | 35,700 | 92–65 |
| 157 | September 27 | Blue Jays | 5–7 | Frasor (3–5) | Bradford (2–1) | Batista (31) | 35,476 | 92–65 |
| 158 | September 28 | Blue Jays | 7–2 | Lilly | Arroyo (14–10) | — | 35,313 | 92–66 |
| 159 | September 29 | Blue Jays | 5–4 | Papelbon (3–1) | Batista (5–8) | — | 35,345 | 93–66 |
| 160 | September 30 | Yankees | 5–3 | Wells (15–7) | Wang (8–5) | Timlin (13) | 34,832 | 94–66 |

October (1–1)

| # | Date | Opponent | Score | Win | Loss | Save | Attendance | Record |
|---|---|---|---|---|---|---|---|---|
| 161 | October 1 | Yankees | 8–4 | Johnson (17–8) | Wakefield (16–12) | — | 34,556 | 94–67 |
| 162 | October 2 | Yankees | 10–1 | Schilling (8–8) | Wright | — | 34,534 | 95–67 |

== Player stats ==
=== Batting ===
==== Starters by position ====
Note: Pos = Position; G = Games played; AB = At bats; H = Hits; Avg. = Batting average; HR = Home runs; RBI = Runs batted in

| Pos | Player | G | AB | H | Avg. | HR | RBI |
| C | Jason Varitek | 133 | 470 | 132 | .281 | 22 | 70 |
| 1B | Kevin Millar | 134 | 449 | 122 | .272 | 9 | 50 |
| 2B | Mark Bellhorn | 85 | 283 | 61 | .216 | 7 | 28 |
| SS | Édgar Rentería | 153 | 623 | 172 | .276 | 8 | 70 |
| 3B | Bill Mueller | 150 | 519 | 153 | .295 | 10 | 62 |
| LF | Manny Ramirez | 152 | 554 | 162 | .292 | 45 | 144 |
| CF | Johnny Damon | 148 | 624 | 197 | .316 | 10 | 75 |
| RF | Trot Nixon | 124 | 408 | 112 | .275 | 13 | 65 |
| DH | David Ortiz | 159 | 601 | 180 | .300 | 47 | 148 |

==== Other batters ====
Note: G = Games played; AB = At bats; H = Hits; Avg. = Batting average; HR = Home runs; RBI = Runs batted in

| Player | G | AB | H | Avg. | HR | RBI |
| Tony Graffanino | 51 | 188 | 60 | .319 | 4 | 20 |
| John Olerud | 87 | 173 | 50 | .289 | 7 | 37 |
| Doug Mirabelli | 50 | 136 | 31 | .228 | 6 | 18 |
| Jay Payton | 55 | 133 | 35 | .263 | 5 | 21 |
| Alex Cora | 47 | 104 | 28 | .269 | 2 | 16 |
| Gabe Kapler | 36 | 97 | 24 | .247 | 1 | 9 |
| Kevin Youkilis | 44 | 79 | 22 | .278 | 1 | 9 |
| Ramón Vázquez | 27 | 61 | 12 | .197 | 0 | 4 |
| Roberto Petagine | 18 | 32 | 9 | .281 | 1 | 9 |
| Adam Hyzdu | 12 | 16 | 4 | .250 | 0 | 0 |
| Adam Stern | 36 | 15 | 2 | .133 | 1 | 2 |
| Kelly Shoppach | 9 | 15 | 0 | .000 | 0 | 0 |
| José Cruz Jr. | 4 | 12 | 3 | .250 | 0 | 0 |
| Dave McCarty | 13 | 4 | 2 | .500 | 0 | 2 |
| Alejandro Machado | 10 | 5 | 1 | .200 | 0 | 0 |
| Hanley Ramirez | 2 | 2 | 0 | .000 | 0 | 0 |
| Shawn Wooten | 1 | 1 | 0 | .000 | 0 | 0 |

=== Pitching ===
==== Starting pitchers ====
Note: G = Games pitched; IP = Innings pitched; W = Wins; L = Losses; ER = Earned run average; SO = Strikeouts

| Player | G | IP | W | L | ERA | SO |
| Tim Wakefield | 33 | 225.1 | 16 | 12 | 4.15 | 151 |
| Bronson Arroyo | 35 | 205.1 | 14 | 10 | 4.51 | 100 |
| Matt Clement | 32 | 191.0 | 13 | 6 | 4.57 | 146 |
| David Wells | 30 | 189.0 | 15 | 7 | 4.45 | 107 |
| Wade Miller | 16 | 91.0 | 4 | 4 | 4.95 | 64 |

==== Other pitchers ====
Note: G = Games pitched; IP = Innings pitched; W = Wins; L = Losses; ERA = Earned run average; SO = Strikeouts

| Player | G | IP | W | L | ERA | SO |
| Curt Schilling | 32 | 93.1 | 8 | 8 | 5.69 | 87 |
| Jonathan Papelbon | 17 | 34.0 | 3 | 1 | 2.65 | 34 |
| Lenny DiNardo | 8 | 14.2 | 0 | 1 | 1.84 | 15 |

==== Relief pitchers ====
Note: G = Games pitched; W = Wins; L = Losses; SV = Saves; ERA = Earned run average; SO = Strikeouts

| Player | G | W | L | SV | ERA | SO |
| Keith Foulke | 43 | 5 | 5 | 15 | 5.91 | 34 |
| Mike Timlin | 81 | 7 | 3 | 13 | 2.24 | 59 |
| Mike Myers | 65 | 3 | 1 | 0 | 3.13 | 21 |
| Alan Embree | 43 | 1 | 4 | 1 | 7.65 | 30 |
| Matt Mantei | 34 | 1 | 0 | 0 | 6.49 | 22 |
| Chad Bradford | 31 | 2 | 1 | 0 | 3.86 | 10 |
| John Halama | 30 | 1 | 1 | 0 | 6.18 | 26 |
| Geremi González | 28 | 2 | 1 | 0 | 6.11 | 28 |
| Manny Delcarmen | 10 | 0 | 0 | 0 | 3.00 | 9 |
| Blaine Neal | 8 | 0 | 1 | 0 | 9.00 | 3 |
| Chad Harville | 8 | 0 | 1 | 0 | 6.43 | 3 |
| Mike Remlinger | 8 | 0 | 0 | 0 | 14.85 | 5 |
| Craig Hansen | 4 | 0 | 0 | 0 | 6.00 | 3 |
| Cla Meredith | 3 | 0 | 0 | 0 | 27.00 | 0 |
| Abe Alvarez | 2 | 0 | 0 | 0 | 15.43 | 1 |
| Mike Stanton | 1 | 0 | 0 | 0 | 0.00 | 1 |
| Scott Cassidy | 1 | 0 | 0 | 0 | 40.50 | 0 |
| Matt Perisho | 1 | 0 | 0 | 0 | inf | 0 |

== ALDS ==
| Game | Score | Date |
|---|---|---|
| 1 | Boston 2, Chicago 14 | October 4 |
| 2 | Boston 4, Chicago 5 | October 5 |
| 3 | Chicago 5, Boston 3 | October 7 |

The Chicago White Sox swept the Red Sox in the American League Division Series. The White Sox went on to win the World Series that year against the Houston Astros. The Red Sox entered the 2005 postseason as a wild card team even though they had the same regular season record as their division rival, the New York Yankees because they lost the regular season head-to-head matchups 10–9.

A crucial moment of the series came in Game 2 when Red Sox second baseman Tony Graffanino made a crucial error that led to the White Sox scoring three unearned runs in the fifth inning. A slow groundball hit to the right side of the infield was able to get past Graffanino and a key double play was not turned. Later in the inning, White Sox second baseman Tadahito Iguchi hit a three-run home run to give the White Sox a one-run lead. Red Sox pitcher David Wells was pitching well in the game until the error. The error is viewed by many fans as having the Red Sox lose Game 2 and eventually the American League Division Series.

Red Sox ace Curt Schilling did not start a game in the American League Division Series after pitching in the last game of the season against the Yankees.

== Awards and honors ==
- David Ortiz – Silver Slugger Award (DH), AL Player of the Month (September)
- Manny Ramirez – Silver Slugger Award (OF)
- Jason Varitek – Silver Slugger Award (C), Gold Glove Award (C)

All-Star Game

- Matt Clement, reserve P (roster replacement)
- Johnny Damon, starting CF
- David Ortiz, starting DH
- Manny Ramirez, starting LF
- Jason Varitek, starting C

== Farm system ==
The Wilmington Blue Rocks replaced the Sarasota Red Sox as the Class A-Advanced affiliate, and the Greenville Bombers replaced the Augusta GreenJackets as the Class A affiliate.

| Level | Team | League | Manager |
|---|---|---|---|
| AAA | Pawtucket Red Sox | International League | Ron Johnson |
| AA | Portland Sea Dogs | Eastern League | Todd Claus |
| A-Advanced | Wilmington Blue Rocks | Carolina League | Dann Bilardello |
| A | Greenville Bombers | South Atlantic League | Chad Epperson |
| A-Short Season | Lowell Spinners | New York–Penn League | Luis Alicea |
| Rookie | GCL Red Sox | Gulf Coast League | Ralph Treuel |
| Rookie | DSL Red Sox | Dominican Summer League | Nelson Paulino |
| Rookie | VSL Red Sox (cooperative) | Venezuelan Summer League | Josman Robles |

VSL cooperative was with the San Diego Padres.
