= 2005 Big League World Series =

Tournament details
- Country: United States
- City: Easley, South Carolina
- Dates: 30 July – 6 August 2005
- Teams: 10

Final positions
- Champions: Easley, South Carolina
- Runner-up: Thousand Oaks, California

The 2005 Big League World Series took place from July 30-August 6 in Easley, South Carolina, United States. Easley, South Carolina defeated Thousand Oaks, California in the championship game. It was South Carolina's third straight championship.

== Teams ==
United States	International
(South Carolina) Easley, South Carolina; District 1 Host	(Guam) Yona, Guam; District 1 Asia–Pacific
(Illinois) Burbank, Illinois; District 15; Central	(Ontario) Ottawa, Ontario; District 2 Canada
(Delaware) Newark, Delaware; District 2 East	(Poland) Kutno, Poland; Kutno; EMEA
(Florida) Dunedin, Florida; District 12; Southeast	(Venezuela) Maracaibo, Venezuela; Luz Cabimas; Latin America
(Mississippi) Biloxi, Mississippi; District 2 Southwest	
(California) Thousand Oaks, California; District 13; West

== Results ==
Group A

Team	W	L	Rs	Ra
Florida	4	0	35	6
South Carolina	3	1	29	7
Illinois	2	2	29	19
Guam	1	3	11	37
Poland	0	4	6	41

	(Florida)	(Guam)	(Illinois)	(Poland)	(South Carolina)
Florida	–	11–1	9–2	11–2	4–1
Guam	1–11	–	4–13	6–3	0–10
Illinois	2–9	13–4	–	11–1	3–5
Poland	2–11	3–6	1–11	–	0–13
South Carolina	1–4	10–0	5–3	13–0	–

Group B

Team	W	L	Rs	Ra
Venezuela	4	0	37	9
California	3	1	31	12
Mississippi	1	3	18	24
Delaware	1	3	12	29
Canada	1	3	8	32

	(California)	(Canada)	(Delaware)	(Mississippi)	(Venezuela)
California	–	7–2	11–1	10–4	3–5
Canada	2–7	–	4–3^{(9)}	0–10	2–12
Delaware	1–11	3–4^{(9)}	–	5–3	3–11
Mississippi	4–10	10–0	3–5	–	1–9
Venezuela	5–3	12–2	11–3	9–1	–

Elimination Round

Semifinals
4–0	Venezuela	5
3–1	South Carolina	7 7th HomeRun
4–0	Florida	0
3–1	California (F/8)	1

World Championship
4–1	South Carolina	10
4–1	California	5

2005 Big League World Series Champions
District 1
Easley, South Carolina
