= Tony Graffanino =

American baseball player (born 1972)

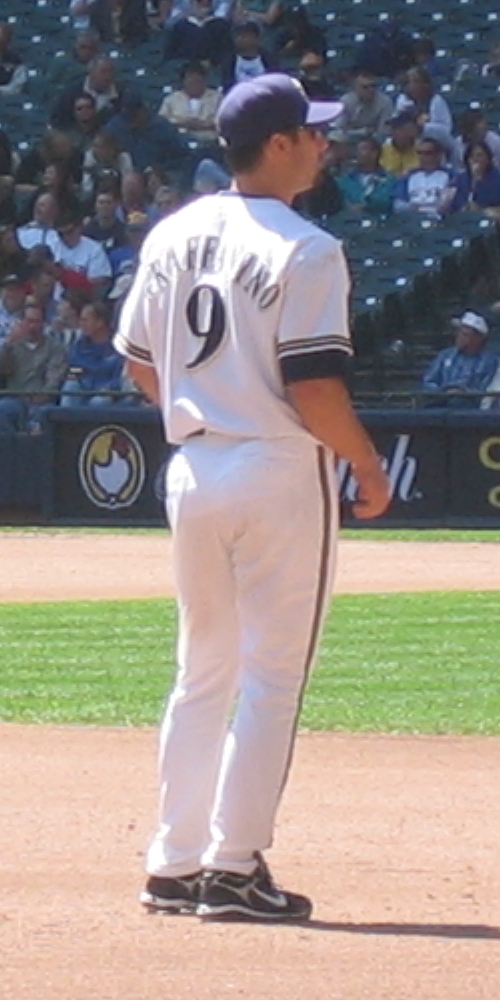
- Graffanino with the Brewers in 2007
- Infielder
- Born: June 6, 1972 (age 54); Amityville, New York, U.S.
- Batted: Right Threw: Right

MLB debut
- April 19, 1996, for the Atlanta Braves

Last MLB appearance
- April 26, 2009, for the Cleveland Indians

MLB statistics
- Batting average: .265
- Home runs: 58
- Runs batted in: 302
- Stats at Baseball Reference

Teams
- Atlanta Braves (1996–1998); Tampa Bay Devil Rays (1999–2000); Chicago White Sox (2000–2003); Kansas City Royals (2004–2005); Boston Red Sox (2005); Kansas City Royals (2006); Milwaukee Brewers (2006–2007); Cleveland Indians (2009)

Anthony Joseph Graffanino (/ˌɡræfəˈniːnoʊ/; born Graffagnino, June 6, 1972) is an American former Major League Baseball second baseman, third baseman, and shortstop.

== Career ==
Graffanino was primarily a contact hitter (just 481 strikeouts in 2787 big-league at-bats) who was able to get on base (career .336 OBP). He excelled as a situational hitter, being capable of hitting behind the runner and dropping down a bunt. As a fielder, he had the ability to play every infield position and left field. He had an above-average arm, which helped him in LF and on the left side of the infield.

During Graffanino's minor league career, he spent time with Pulaski in 1990, the Idaho Falls Braves of the Pioneer League in 1991, the Macon Braves of the South Atlantic League in 1992, the Durham Bulls in 1993 and the Greenville Braves of the Southern League in 1994.

After spending three years with the Atlanta Braves, 2 1/2 seasons with the Tampa Bay Devil Rays, and another 3 1/2 with the Chicago White Sox, Graffanino played only second base for the Kansas City Royals in 2004, but moved around more in 2005. Obtained by the Boston Red Sox for Chip Ambres and Juan Cedeño after the All-Star Game, he started at second base following the cut of Mark Bellhorn.

In 2005, Graffanino hit .298 for the Royals and .319 with the Red Sox for a combined .309 (117-for-379), a career high. He also posted career numbers in RBI (38), runs (68), doubles (17), games (110), and hits. He made an error in the fifth inning of Game Two of the 2005 American League Division Series which led to three unearned runs. The runs came on a two-out, three-run home run by White Sox 2B Tadahito Iguchi which proved to be the game-winning hit. The Red Sox were swept in that series.

Graffanino was claimed off waivers by the Royals prior to the start of the 2006 season. He hit .268 in 69 games for the Royals before being traded to the Milwaukee Brewers at the 2006 All-Star Break for left-handed pitcher, Jorge De La Rosa.

In 2007, Graffanino struggled to begin the year, but after the call up of talented prospect Ryan Braun, Graffanino seemed to be invigorated and raised his sub .200 batting average to over .240 over a month's time. He slugged nine home runs in only 231 at bats that season. But on August 8, Graffanino tore his ACL, ending his season with a .238 batting average. After the 2007 World Series, he officially became a free agent.

On June 24, 2008, he signed a minor league contract with the Cleveland Indians. He hit .315 in 25 games and became a free agent at the end of the season. In February 2009, he re-signed with the Indians. In October 2009 Graffanino became a free agent.

== Personal life ==
As of 2005, Graffanino identified as an evangelical Christian. He remained active in the community during his career. In 2002, he coordinated and led baseball clinics for boys and girls from Mercy Home at U.S. Cellular Field and signed autographs at the James R. Thompson Center to promote the need for organ donors.

Graffanino was born Anthony Graffagnino but dropped the second "g" after numerous mispronunciations from minor league announcers. He grew up in East Islip, New York. He and his wife, Nicole, have two sons, A.J. and Nicholas. A.J. was drafted by the Braves in the eighth round of the 2018 Major League Baseball draft.
