= Juan Cedeño =

Dominican baseball player (born 1983)

- Pitcher
- Born: August 19, 1983 (age 42); Higüey, La Altagracia, Dominican Republic
- Batted: Left Threw: Left

KBO debut
- May 26, 2009, for the Doosan Bears

Last KBO appearance
- 2009, for the Doosan Bears

KBO statistics
- Win–loss record: 4–7
- Earned run average: 5.70
- Strikeouts: 41
- Stats at Baseball Reference

Teams
- Doosan Bears (2009)
Medals
Men's baseball
Representing Dominican Republic
World Baseball Classic
Gold medal – first place	2013 San Francisco	Team

Juan Cedeño (born August 19, 1983) is a Dominican former professional baseball pitcher. He played in the KBO League for the Doosan Bears in 2009.

== Career ==
The Boston Red Sox signed Cedeño as an international free agent in 2001. He played organization from 2002 through 2005, until he was traded with Chip Ambres to the Kansas City Royals for Tony Graffanino. Cedeño played for the Royals organization from 2005 through 2007. He split the 2008 season in the Detroit Tigers and Los Angeles Dodgers organizations. In 2009, Cedeño pitched for the Doosan Bears of the Korea Baseball Organization.

Cedeño didn't pitch in 2010. He pitched for the independent baseball Rio Grande Valley WhiteWings in 2011. In the 2011-12 offseason, he signed a minor league contract with the New York Yankees, receiving an invitation to spring training.

Cedeño was traded from Scranton-Wilkes Barre, Yankees' Triple-A affiliate, to Gwinnett, the Atlanta Braves' Triple-A affiliate, on May 12, 2013.
