= Alejandro Machado =

Venezuelan baseball player (born 1982)

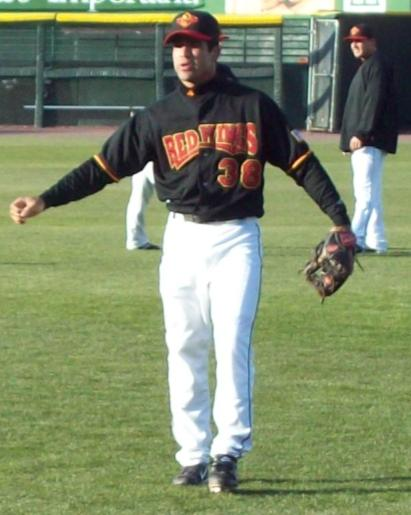
- Shortstop
- Born: April 26, 1982 (age 43); Caracas, Venezuela
- Batted: Switch Threw: Right

MLB debut
- September 2, 2005, for the Boston Red Sox

Last MLB appearance
- October 2, 2005, for the Boston Red Sox

MLB statistics (through 2008 season)
- Batting average: .200
- Home runs: 0
- Runs batted in: 0
- Stats at Baseball Reference

Teams
- Boston Red Sox (2005)

Alejandro José Machado (born April 26, 1982) is a Venezuelan former professional baseball infielder who played in Major League Baseball for the Boston Red Sox during the 2005 season. He was a switch-hitter and threw right-handed.

== Career ==
In 2004 Machado hit a combined .306 with 30 stolen bases in a career-high 139 games with the Expos' Single-A Brevard and Double-A Harrisburg clubs. He posted a .399 on-base percentage between the two stops, and tied for the organization lead with his 30 steals, while ranking fourth in batting. Machado also hit five home runs with 45 RBI and 63 walks.

The Boston Red Sox selected Machado in the Rule 5 draft from the Washington Nationals, Machado spent his first season at the Triple-A level with the Pawtucket Red Sox in 2005, being honored with the PawSox Rookie-of-the-Year Award. He was among Pawtucket's most consistent players all season, and finished 10th in the International League with a .300 batting average. He also tied for the club-lead with 21 stolen bases and played tremendous defense at second base, shortstop, and even in the outfield.

The Red Sox added Machado to their roster on September 1. In ten games he posted a .200 batting average (1-for-5) with one double and four runs. His first major league run scored occurred during a strange turn of events when outfielder Gabe Kapler injured himself while running on what turned out to be a home run. After the game was halted to deal with Kapler's injury, Machado achieved his first major league run as a pinch-runner for the ailing Kapler.

He was signed by the Washington Nationals to a minor league deal in November 2006. During the 2006 Winter Meetings, Machado was taken by the Minnesota Twins in the Rule 5 draft. After spending most of 2007 on the major league disabled list, a trade was worked out to nullify the Rule 5 draft restrictions, enabling the Twins to assign Machado to the minor leagues for the 2008 season.

He attended the Twins' 2009 major league spring training camp but was sent to minor league camp on April 1, 2009.

Machado was signed to a minor league contract on January 5, 2010, by the New York Mets.

== See also ==
- List of Major League Baseball players from Venezuela
- Rule 5 draft results
