= 2005 in baseball =

The following are the baseball events of the year 2005 throughout the world.

== Headline events of the year ==
- Chicago White Sox swept (4–0) the Houston Astros to win the 2005 World Series.
- 2005 also marked the inaugural season of the Washington Nationals, who relocated from Montreal and were formerly known as the Expos. This is Washington, D.C.'s first MLB team since the Washington Senators became the Texas Rangers following the 1971 season.
- Chris Burke ended the 2005 NLDS with a walk-off home run in the bottom of the 18th inning.
- The Astros went from 15–30 to the 2005 World Series. They had a 22–7 record in July.

== Champions ==
=== Major League Baseball ===
- Regular season Champions

League	Eastern Division Champion	Central Division Champion	Western Division Champion	Wild Card Qualifier
American League	New York Yankees	Chicago White Sox	Los Angeles Angels of Anaheim	Boston Red Sox
National League	Atlanta Braves	St. Louis Cardinals	San Diego Padres	Houston Astros

- World Series Champion – Chicago White Sox
- Postseason – October 4 to October 26

Division Series; TV: ESPN/FOX
1	Chicago White Sox	3
4	Boston Red Sox	0
American League
2	LA Angels of Anaheim	3
3	New York Yankees	2
1	St. Louis Cardinals	3
3	San Diego Padres	0
National League
2	Atlanta Braves	1
4	Houston Astros	3

League Championship Series; TV: FOX
1	Chicago White Sox	4
2	LA Angels of Anaheim	1
1	St. Louis Cardinals	2
4	Houston Astros	4

World Series; TV: FOX
AL1	Chicago White Sox	4
NL4	Houston Astros	0

Click on any series score to link to that series' page.
Higher seed has home field advantage during Division Series and League Championship Series.
American League has home field advantage during World Series as a result of American League victory in 2005 All-Star Game.
National League is seeded 1-3/2-4 as a result of NL regular season champion (St. Louis Cardinals) and NL wild card (Houston Astros) coming from the same division.

- Postseason MVPs
  - World Series MVP – Jermaine Dye
  - ALCS MVP – Paul Konerko
  - NLCS MVP – Roy Oswalt
- All-Star Game, July 12 at Comerica Park – American League, 7-5; Miguel Tejada, MVP
  - Home Run Derby, July 11 – Bobby Abreu, Philadelphia Phillies

=== International ===
- Baseball World Cup — Cuba over South Korea
- European Baseball Championship — Netherlands over Italy

=== Professional ===
- Asia Series — Chiba Lotte Marines (Japan) over Samsung Lions (Korea)
- Caribbean World Series — Venados de Mazatlán (Mexico)
- China Baseball League — Beijing Tigers over Tianjin Lions
- Chinese Professional Baseball League (Taiwan) — Sinon Bulls over Macoto Cobras
- European Cup — Grosseto (Italy) over HCAW Bussum (Netherlands)
- Holland Series — DOOR Neptunus over HCAW Bussum
- Italy Serie A1 — Italeri Bologna over Leader T&A San Marino
- Japan Series — Chiba Lotte Marines over Hanshin Tigers
- Korean Series — Samsung Lions over Doosan Bears
- Taiwan Series — Sinon Bulls over Macoto Cobras

==== Minor leagues ====
- AAA
  - International League — Toledo Mud Hens
  - Mexican League — Mexico Tigres
  - Pacific Coast League — Nashville Sounds
- AA
  - Eastern League — Akron Aeros
  - Southern League — Jacksonville Suns
  - Texas League — Midland RockHounds
- High-A
  - California League — San Jose Giants
  - Carolina League — Frederick Keys
  - Florida State League — Palm Beach Cardinals
- Low-A
  - Midwest League — South Bend Silver Hawks
  - South Atlantic League — Kannapolis Intimidators
- Class-A Short Season
  - New York–Penn League — Staten Island Yankees
  - Northwest League — Spokane Indians
- Rookie
  - Appalachian League — Elizabethton Twins
  - Pioneer League — Orem Owlz
- Independent
  - Atlantic League – Somerset Patriots
  - Can-Am League – Worcester Tornadoes
  - Frontier League – Kalamazoo Kings
  - Northern League — Gary SouthShore RailCats
  - Golden Baseball League — San Diego Surf Dawgs

=== Amateur ===
- College World Series
  - National Collegiate Athletic Association
    - Division I — University of Texas
    - Division II — Florida Southern College
    - Division III — University of Wisconsin–Whitewater
  - National Association of Intercollegiate Athletics — Oklahoma City University
- Cuban National Series — Santiago de Cuba over Havana Province

=== Youth ===
- Big League World Series: District 1 (Easley, South Carolina)
    - Junior League World Series: West Oahu Little League (Ewa Beach, Hawaii)
    - Little League World Series: Curundu LL (Panama City, Panama)
    - Senior League World Series: Urbandale LL (Urbandale, Iowa)

== Awards and honors ==
- Baseball Hall of Fame inductions
  - Wade Boggs and Ryne Sandberg are selected by the BBWAA.
  - Jerry Coleman wins the Ford C. Frick Award for broadcasters.
  - Peter Gammons receives the J. G. Taylor Spink Award for sportswriters.
- Major League Baseball awards

Note: The Comeback Player of the Year Award was voted on for the first time by fans.

Award	National League	American League
Most Valuable Player	Albert Pujols, STL	Alex Rodriguez, NYY
Cy Young	Chris Carpenter, STL	Bartolo Colón, LAA
Manager of the Year	Bobby Cox, ATL	Ozzie Guillén, CWS
Relief Man of the Year	Chad Cordero, WSH	Mariano Rivera, NYY
Rookie of the Year	Ryan Howard, PHI	Huston Street, OAK
Comeback Player of the Year	Ken Griffey Jr., CIN	Jason Giambi, NYY

- Gold Glove Awards:
  - AL: Kenny Rogers (P), Jason Varitek (C), Mark Teixeira (1B), Orlando Hudson (2B), Eric Chavez (3B), Derek Jeter (SS), Ichiro Suzuki (OF), Torii Hunter (OF), Vernon Wells (OF)
  - NL: Greg Maddux (P), Mike Matheny (C), Derrek Lee (1B), Luis Castillo (2B), Mike Lowell (3B), Omar Vizquel (SS), Jim Edmonds (OF), Andruw Jones (OF), Bobby Abreu (OF)
- Player of the Month – April: Brian Roberts (AL), Derrek Lee (NL); May: Alex Rodriguez (AL), Bobby Abreu (NL); June: Travis Hafner (AL), Andruw Jones (NL); July: Jason Giambi (AL), Adam Dunn (NL); August: Alex Rodriguez (AL), Andruw Jones (NL); September: David Ortiz (AL), Randy Winn (NL)
- Pitcher of the Month – April: Jon Garland (AL), Dontrelle Willis (NL); May: Kenny Rogers (AL), Trevor Hoffman (NL); June: Mark Buehrle (AL), Chad Cordero (NL); July: Barry Zito (AL), Andy Pettitte (NL); August: Bartolo Colón (AL), Noah Lowry (NL); September: José Contreras (AL), Andy Pettitte (NL)
- Rookie of the Month – April: Gustavo Chacín (AL), Clint Barmes (NL); May: Damon Hollins (AL), Ryan Church (NL); June: Joe Blanton (AL), Garrett Atkins (NL); July: Gustavo Chacín (AL), Zach Duke (NL); August: Joe Blanton (AL), Zach Duke (NL); September: Robinson Canó (AL), Ryan Howard (NL)
- Woman Executive of the Year (major or minor league): Lisa Walker, Salem-Keizer Volcanoes, Northwest League

== Events ==
=== January–March ===
- January 3 – Wade Boggs, a five-time batting champion, and Ryne Sandberg, a nine-time Gold Glove winner at second base, are elected to the Baseball Hall of Fame. Boggs receives 474 votes, or 91.9 percent of the 516 ballots cast. Sandberg receives 393 votes, six more than the needed number. Relief pitchers Bruce Sutter (66.7 percent) and Rich "Goose" Gossage (55.2), and outfielders Jim Rice (59.5) and Andre Dawson (52.3), are the only other players to be named on at least half of the ballots cast.
- January 21 – Roger Clemens and the Houston Astros agree to an $18 million, one-year contract. Clemens, a seven-time Cy Young Award winner, agrees to a deal that makes him the highest-paid pitcher for the fifth time, following deals with the Boston Red Sox in 1989 ($2.5 million) and 1991 ($5.38 million); with the Toronto Blue Jays before the 1997 season, and with the New York Yankees in 2000 ($15.45 million).
- February 2 – The trade that sent Sammy Sosa to the Baltimore Orioles from the Chicago Cubs is finalized after commissioner Bud Selig approves the deal and the slugger passes his physical. Chicago receives second baseman Jerry Hairston Jr. and two minor leaguers, then signs Jeromy Burnitz as a free agent to replace Sosa in right field.
- February 6 – At Mazatlán, Mexico, Francisco Campos turns in another brilliant outing, and Mexican champion Venados de Mazatlán (Mazatlán Deers) holds on in the final game, edging the Dominican Republic 4-3 to win the 56th Caribbean World Series. The title is just Mexico's fifth since joining the competition in 1970, the second in the last four years, but its first since hosting the series. Campos allows just three hits – two infield hits and a bunt single – and a run over his first eight innings of work, striking out 11. Previously, Campos handcuffed the Venezuelan champion Tigres de Aragua (Aragua Tigers) 4-0 in the series opener. He allowed just three hits over eight innings and struck out 10. Campos is voted the Series MVP.
- February 16 – The players' union signs an agreement calling for international drug-testing rules during a 16-team World Cup tournament (eventually called the World Baseball Classic) during 2006 spring training. Each team will select a provisional roster of 60 players, 45 days before the start of the tournament, and players will be covered by the drug-testing rules until the end of the competition. The deal, signed by the union, the commissioner's office and the International Baseball Federation, states that IBAF rules will cover the frequency of testing before and during the tournament, the list of prohibited substances, the procedures for taking samples and the laboratories used. More substances are banned by the IBAF than by the major leagues.
- March 2 – Thirty-two years after his death, Jackie Robinson receives the Congressional Gold Medal in the Capitol Rotunda, the highest honor Congress can bestow. The medal is accepted by Rachel Robinson, his widow. Baseball is represented in a way by former Texas Rangers executive George W. Bush. Robinson joins Roberto Clemente, Joe Louis and Jesse Owens as the only athletes among about 300 Gold Medal recipients. Following the ceremony, the Boston Red Sox are honored at the White House for winning the 2004 World Series.
- March 17 – Mark McGwire, Sammy Sosa, Rafael Palmeiro and Jose Canseco appeared before the House Government Reform Committee to discuss the topic of performance-enhancing drugs in Major League Baseball. McGwire and Palmeiro were named as steroid users in Canseco's book, Juiced. McGwire declined to answer questions under oath when he appeared before the House Government Reform Committee. Sosa and Palmeiro both denied under oath ever having used PEDs, whereas McGwire never gave a committed answer, simply repeatedly stating, "I'm not here to talk about the past. I'm here to be positive about this subject."

=== April ===
- April 3 – In his first outing for the New York Yankees, Randy Johnson allows a run and five hits in six innings as the Yankees open the 2005 major league season with a 9-2 triumph over the 2004 World Champion Boston Red Sox.
- April 4 – Opening Day highlights:
  - Baltimore Orioles Sammy Sosa and Rafael Palmeiro become the first pair of teammates to have at least 500 career home runs apiece. Sosa went into the season with 574 career HR and Palmeiro 551.
  - Mark Buehrle yields two hits in eight shutout innings and Shingo Takatsu works a perfect ninth inning as the Chicago White Sox defeat the Cleveland Indians 1-0 in a game that takes only an hour and 51 minutes to complete. Indians pitcher Jake Westbrook allows only one run and four hits in going the distance, but it isn't good enough to win. The game's only run comes in the seventh inning on an error by Cleveland shortstop Jhonny Peralta.
  - Center fielder Brad Wilkerson has the honor of being the first batter for the Washington Nationals, and he promptly responds with the first hit in Nationals history. Nevertheless, Kenny Lofton hits a three-run homer and Jon Lieber pitches 5 2/3 effective innings, leading the home team Philadelphia Phillies to an 8-4 victory over the Nationals.
  - Dmitri Young of the Detroit Tigers becomes the third player to hit three home runs on Opening Day, joining George Bell (1988) and Tuffy Rhodes (1994). The host Tigers defeat the Kansas City Royals 11-2 at Comerica Park.
- April 6 – Brad Wilkerson of the Washington Nationals hits for the cycle in the Nationals' first win since moving to Washington, D.C., 7-3 against the Philadelphia Phillies. He becomes the twentieth player to hit for the cycle twice. One day later, Wilkerson continues his torrid hitting going 4-for-5, as the Nationals complete their first series by winning two of three against the Phillies.

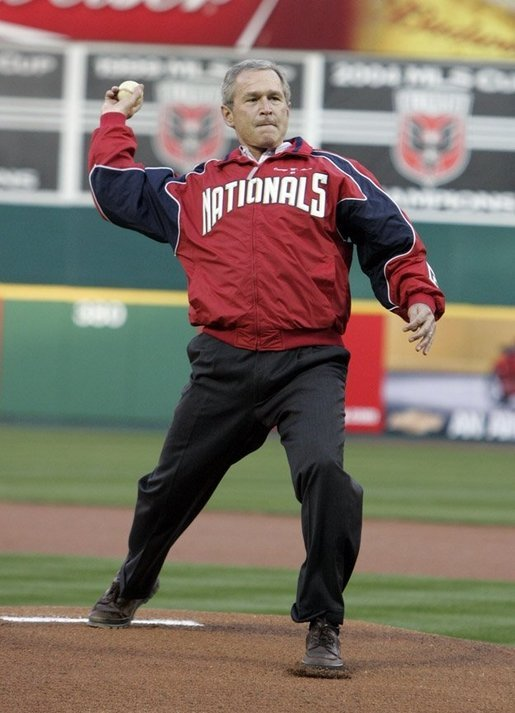
President George W. Bush throws out the ceremonial first pitch at RFK Stadium in Washington, D.C. on April 14, 2005.

- April 14 – On a historic night at RFK Stadium, Liván Hernández and Vinny Castilla are up to the task. Hernández carries a one-hitter into the ninth inning and Castilla falls a single shy of the cycle as the Washington Nationals post a 5-3 victory over the Arizona Diamondbacks in the first major league game in Washington, D.C. in over 33 years. After beginning their first season in the nation's capital with a nine-game road trip, the Nationals open the first game at RFK Stadium since the departure of the Washington Senators with former pitcher Joe Grzenda handing a ball to President George W. Bush, who throws the ceremonial first pitch. Grzenda tossed the final pitch in Senators history against the New York Yankees on September 30, 1971.
- April 15 – Sammy Sosa hits his first home run at Camden Yards, giving him homers in 42 different ballparks. Currently seventh on the all-time list with 576 home runs, Sosa and Miguel Tejada have three RBI apiece as the Orioles defeat the Yankees 10-1.
- April 16 – Manny Ramírez knocks in all six Sox runs with a grand slam and a two-run shot, and Matt Clement wins in his Fenway Park debut to lead the Boston Red Sox over the Tampa Bay Devil Rays. It is Ramírez's 18th career grand slam, most among active players. The homer ties him for third on the all-time grand slam list with Willie McCovey and Robin Ventura, behind only Eddie Murray (19) and Lou Gehrig (23). It is Ramirez's 40th career multi-homer game (38 two-homer games, two three-homer games).
- April 26 – At Yankee Stadium, Alex Rodriguez slugs his way to the best performance of his career, hitting three home runs for the third time and driving in a career-high 10 runs as the Yankees win 12-4 over the Los Angeles Angels of Anaheim. Rodríguez comes within one RBI of matching the American League record held by Hall of Famer and former Yankee Tony Lazzeri.
- April 27 – Mark Grudzielanek became the first St. Louis Cardinals player to hit for the cycle in nine seasons, and pitcher Chris Carpenter equaled his career best with 12 strikeouts, as St. Louis beat the Milwaukee Brewers 6–3. Besides, Grudzielanek became the third Cardinals player to hit for the cycle at 40-year-old Busch Stadium, that would be demolished after this season. The other Cardinals that achieved the feat in the old ballpark were Ray Lankford on September 15, 1991 against the New York Mets, and Lou Brock on May 27, 1975 against the San Diego Padres.

=== May ===
- May 6: – During a 6-5 win over the St. Louis Cardinals, San Diego Padres closer Trevor Hoffman becomes just the third pitcher in major league history to reach the 400-save plateau, joining Lee Smith (478) and John Franco (424). Hoffman has converted 400 of 450 save chances in his career.
- May 7 – Julio Franco hits 3-for-4 including his first home run of the season as the Atlanta Braves beat the Houston Astros 4-1. Franco, who turns 47 on August 23, becomes the second-oldest player in major league history to homer at 46 years, 257 days. Jack Quinn, a pitcher, was 46 years, 357 days when he hit one for the Philadelphia Athletics on June 27, 1930.
- May 8 – At Fenway Park, the Boston Red Sox beat the Seattle Mariners 6-3, as pitcher Geremi González wins for the first time since August 19, 2003. He was 0-11 in his previous 15 starts. González pitches 5 2/3 strong innings as a fill-in for injured Boston aces Curt Schilling and David Wells. After pitching a no-hitter through five innings, he allows two earned runs on four hits and two walks while striking out six.
- May 14 – Little League pitcher Katie Brownell pitched a perfect game for her team, the Dodgers of Oakfield, New York. In addition to pitching a perfect game, Brownell, the only girl playing in the Oakland-Alabama Little League, struck out every batter she faced in the six-inning game. She was honored at a ceremony held at the National Baseball Hall of Fame. She donated her jersey from the game for an exhibit on women or youth in baseball at the Hall of Fame. She also met President George W. Bush as well as Maria Pepe and Tommy Lasorda.
- May 15 – At Safeco Field, Boston's Manny Ramírez hits his 400th career home run, a three-run shot in the fifth inning off Seattle starter Gil Meche. Ramírez was the 39th player in major league history to reach 400 homers and just the fifth to reach the mark in a Red Sox uniform. The others were Jimmie Foxx, Ted Williams, Carl Yastrzemski, and Andre Dawson. He also was the 13th player to reach the mark before his 33rd birthday and just the fourth since Harmon Killebrew in 1969, and the fifth-fastest to 400 in number of at-bats, behind Mark McGwire, Babe Ruth, Killebrew and Jim Thome. Meche and the Mariners overcome Ramírez's milestone to beat the Red Sox 5–4.
- May 21:
  - The San Francisco Giants hold a celebration in honor of Hall of Famer Juan Marichal. A 9-foot bronze statue of Marichal is dedicated on the plaza outside of the ballpark, joining similar larger than life-size sculptures of Willie Mays and Willie McCovey. Leonel Fernández, the President of the Dominican Republic, is in attendance. In the game which follows the ceremonies, the Giants wear uniforms with the word "Gigantes" on the front (the Spanish word for "Giants"), the first time in the club's 123-year history it has worn such threads. The uniforms are to be auctioned off afterward. Many of Marichal's former teammates are in attendance, including Mays, McCovey, Felipe Alou, Orlando Cepeda and Gaylord Perry.
  - At Arlington, David Dellucci hits two of the Texas Rangers' team-record eight home runs in an 18-3 rout of the Houston Astros. Rod Barajas, Mark Teixeira, Hank Blalock and Laynce Nix connect homers to highlight a club record four-homer second inning, and Richard Hidalgo and Kevin Mench also homer to help the Rangers top their previous best of seven, accomplished in 1986 and 2003.
- May 23 – At Cooperstown, New York, minor leaguer Derek Nicholson hits a two-run home run with two outs in the bottom of the ninth inning, sending the Detroit Tigers to a 6-4 victory over the Boston Red Sox in the annual Hall of Fame game. Nicholson, who plays for the Class A Lakeland Tigers of the Florida State League, sends a 1-0 pitch from reliever Barry Hertzler of the Class A Wilmington Blue Rocks of the Carolina League over the fence in left-center field. In the traditional home run contest staged before the game, David Ortiz of the Red Sox hits a record-breaking eight in his 10 official swings. He hits his last one, a drive that barely cleared the wall in right field, with a broken bat.
- May 25 – The St. Louis Cardinals beat the Pittsburgh Pirates 2–1 in 12 innings, as manager Tony La Russa won his 823rd game with the Cardinals, passing Whitey Herzog for second place on the franchise list. La Russa is 218 victories behind franchise leader Red Schoendienst.
- May 28:
  - During a ceremony at Great American Ball Park, the Cincinnati Reds retire uniform No. 10 of former manager Sparky Anderson. Now Anderson's number joins those of Johnny Bench (5), Joe Morgan (8), Tony Pérez (24), Frank Robinson (20), Fred Hutchinson (1) and Ted Kluszewski (18) that have been retired by the team.
  - Derrek Lee hits two home runs for the second straight game and the fourth time this season, leading the Chicago Cubs to a 5-1 victory over the Colorado Rockies at Wrigley Field.
- May 30:
  - The Chicago White Sox extend manager Ozzie Guillén's contract, making the move while the team has the best record in the majors (33-17). Chicago picks up the 2006 option on Guillén's contract, adds two more years and includes an option for the 2009 season.
  - 42-year-old Jamie Moyer pitches six solid innings for his 131st win with the Seattle Mariners, passing Randy Johnson to become the club's career leader as the Mariners beat the visiting Toronto Blue Jays, 4-3. Over 20 major league seasons, he's 197-147.

=== June ===
- June 1 – The Houston Astros defeat the Cincinnati Reds 4-1, as pitcher Roy Oswalt takes the major league lead for victories against a team without a defeat, improving to 14-0 against visiting Cincinnati. Oswalt was tied for the lead in victories against one team without a loss with Pedro Martínez, who has a 13-0 record against the Seattle Mariners. Randy Johnson is 12-0 against the Chicago Cubs.
- June 2 – The New York Yankees are swept by the worst team in baseball, falling 5-2 to the Kansas City Royals for their first five-game losing streak in more than two years. It's been a ball so far for Buddy Bell, the new Royals skipper who is unbeaten after sweeping three games from the visiting Yankees. Kansas City pitchers allow just six runs in the series. It's the third time in their storied history the Yankees have been swept in three games by the team with the worst record in the majors. The other times were in 2000 by the Detroit Tigers and 1937 by the Philadelphia Athletics; in both those seasons, New York won the American League pennant. Kansas City completes its first three-game sweep at home of the Yankees in 15 years. The Royals had gone 78 series without sweeping anyone, the longest drought in the majors since the Philadelphia Phillies went 79 series without a sweep from 1996-97. Despite their three-game sweep, the Royals' record of 16-37 is still the worst in the majors.
- June 4:
  - Chan Ho Park earns his 100th major league win, Michael Young gets four hits and the Texas Rangers beat the Kansas City Royals 14-9 to hand the Royals their first loss under new manager Buddy Bell. Park also becomes the first South Korean pitcher to win 100 games in the majors.
  - Garret Anderson's go-ahead, three-run homer caps a four-run seventh inning, and the Los Angeles Angels pass the host Boston Red Sox 13-6. Anderson's homer gives him a club-record 990 RBI, breaking the old mark of 989 set by Tim Salmon.
  - The contract sending Babe Ruth from the Red Sox to the New York Yankees goes up for sale. This is all that remains of the Curse of the Bambino: five neatly typed pages, two bold signatures, and the scars from 86 years of torment.
- June 5 – For the first time since 1933, a team called Washington is in first place late in the season. Ryan Church helps lift the Washington Nationals into first place in the NL East Division with a three-run home run, as the Nationals complete a three-game sweep of the visiting Florida Marlins with a 6-3 triumph. The victory, coupled with Atlanta's loss to Pittsburgh, puts Washington in first place. The Nationals have come from behind for 21 of their 31 victories, including each of its last eight. 75 years ago, the Washington Senators team that won the American League pennant topped the standings this time of year or later.
- June 7 – Justin Upton, a slugging high school shortstop from Virginia, is taken by the Arizona Diamondbacks with the No. 1 pick in the 2005 baseball draft. He and his brother B.J., the second pick in 2002 by Tampa Bay, are the highest-drafted siblings.
- June 8:
  - Yankee third baseman Alex Rodriguez becomes the youngest member of the 400-home run club when he hits a solo shot in the eighth inning of New York's 12-3 win over host Milwaukee. The home run is the second of the game for the 29-year-old, who becomes the 40th player in major league history to reach 400 homers, with two more than Dale Murphy and one more than Al Kaline and Andrés Galarraga.
  - Minnesota ace Johan Santana improves to 15-0 over his last 17 road starts, when he pitches an 8-0 four-hit, nine-strikeout shutout against Arizona.
- June 9 – The SF Giants' Omar Vizquel plays in his 2,179th game as a shortstop, passing Dave Concepción for sole possession of sixth place on the career list. Hall of Famer Luis Aparicio holds the record of 2,581.
- June 10 – The 1919 contract that shipped Babe Ruth from the Boston Red Sox to the New York Yankees sells at auction for a staggering $996,000, delighting its new owner, Pete Siegel, a die-hard Yankees fan, and a hunger-relief group designated to receive a financial windfall from the sale. The price is nearly double the presale estimate for the December 26, 1919, contract, signed by owners Harry Frazee of the Red Sox and Jacob Ruppert of Yankees, and nearly 10 times the $100,000 cost of purchasing Ruth.
- June 12 – Acquired in a trade two days before, Junior Spivey hits a two-run home run as the Washington Nationals tie a franchise record with their 10th consecutive win – a 3–2 victory over the Seattle Mariners. Before relocating to the nation's capital this season, the Nationals were known as the Montreal Expos, who won 10 straight games three previous times in 1979, 1980 and 1997. The Nationals have won 13 of their last 14 games overall, with eight of the wins coming by one run, and complete a 12-1 homestand. Tony Armas Jr. pitches five scoreless innings, allowing five hits, and is 2-0 with a 1.59 ERA in his last three starts.
- June 14:
  - The Boston Red Sox honor their Hall of Fame catcher Carlton Fisk and the 12th-inning home run that won Game 6 of the 1975 World Series by naming the left field foul pole where it landed the "Fisk Pole". In a pregame ceremony from the Monster Seats, Fisk is cheered by the Fenway Park crowd while the shot is replayed to the strains of Handel's Hallelujah Chorus. The Red Sox scheduled the ceremony to coincide with an interleague series against the Cincinnati Reds, who make their first trip back to Fenway Park since the '75 Series. Thirty years later, the video of Fisk trying to wave the ball fair remains one of the game's enduring images; Game 6 is often called the best game in major leagues history. Fenway's right field foul pole, which is just 302 feet from the plate, has long been unofficially named the Pesky Pole, for light-hitting former Red Sox shortstop Johnny Pesky, who had a tendency to curve fly balls around it for homers. On the field, Fisk throws out the ceremonial first pitch to former battery-mate Luis Tiant.
  - Commissioner Bud Selig favors reversing use of the designated hitter for interleague games next season. Under Selig's proposal, which will be considered during the offseason, the DH would be used in National League parks instead of in American League stadiums.
- June 15 – Ichiro Suzuki of the Seattle Mariners collects his 1,000th career hit, becoming just the third player since 1900 to reach the plateau in fewer than 700 games.
- June 16:
  - Atlanta Braves veteran first baseman Julio Franco (46) has his first two-steal game since 1994, and teammate pitcher John Smoltz (38) has his first two-hit game since 1999.
  - The Colorado Rockies become the seventh team since 1900 to go 4-26 in its first 30 road games, joining the Washington Senators (1904), Philadelphia Athletics (1916), Philadelphia Phillies (1928), Chicago Cubs (1981), Minnesota Twins (1982) and Tampa Bay Devil Rays (2005).
  - The Pittsburgh Pirates are the only major league team with at least one extra-base hit in every game this season.
  - With a 9-6 victory over the Los Angeles Dodgers, Kansas City becomes the first major league team to have three-game sweeps of the Dodgers and Yankees in one regular season, according to the Elias Sports Bureau. According to Elias, the Angels and Mariners also swept the Yankees and Dodgers in one season since interleague play began in 1997, but both were not three-game sweeps. Kansas City is 11-4 since Buddy Bell took over as manager May 31.
- June 17:
  - The Baltimore Orioles' Miguel Tejada plays in his 822nd consecutive game, tying Gus Suhr for ninth place on the all-time list.
  - Former Boston Red Sox Brian Daubach starts at first base for the New York Mets, drawing three walks and scoring two runs one day after being called up from Triple-A Norfolk. Daubach was drafted by the Mets in the 17th round in 1990, but this is his first big league game for the club.
- June 18 – Veteran Julio Franco hits a pair of home runs and Andruw Jones and Johnny Estrada also homer as the Atlanta Braves beat the host Cincinnati Reds 6-1.
- June 19 – Rafael Palmeiro hits his 560th career home run to give Baltimore a sixth-inning lead, and the Orioles shake off manager Lee Mazzilli's first career ejection to beat the Colorado Rockies 4-2.
- June 24:
  - At Yankee Stadium, the New York Mets set a National League record by hitting three sacrifice flies in one inning, an oddity accomplished three times by American League teams. Ramón Castro, José Reyes and Mike Cameron each hit one in the second inning, and Reyes adds his second of the game in the ninth, as the Mets defeat the Yankees 6-4.
  - Los Angeles Dodgers closer Éric Gagné has season-ending elbow surgery which goes better than expected. Gagné does not need a ligament replaced and could return by spring training. Originally expected to be out 12-to-14 months, Gagné now faces about six months recovery time, and may start throwing a baseball even earlier.
- June 27:
  - Julio Franco hits his eighth career grand slam as the Atlanta Braves get past the Florida Marlins. The 46-year-old Atlanta first baseman has shown in June that he clearly can still play the game. In his last seven appearances, Franco is hitting .458 with four home runs and 11 RBI, and is making plenty of entries on those oldest-to-do-whatever lists. Earlier this month, he became the oldest player in major league history to have a two-homer game, the oldest in the last 96 years to steal a base and extended his own mark for being the oldest to hit a grand slam.
  - Baltimore's Rafael Palmeiro gets two more hits in a 6-4 loss to the New York Yankees, moving him past Sam Rice into sole possession of 26th place on the all-time list. Palmeiro is 11 hits shy of becoming the fourth player in major league history with 3,000 hits and 500 homers.
- June 28 – Following today's Minnesota Twins game, Australian rookie Glenn Williams is sent back down. Up for a cup of coffee since June 7, he hits safely in all thirteen Twins games in which he plays. He returns to minors with seventeen hits, a .425 batting average and – since he'll never return to the majors – an active 13-game hitting streak.

=== July ===
- July 5 – At Arlington, Tim Wakefield takes the mound for his 300th major league start and Manny Ramírez hits his third grand slam this season, and 20th of his career, as the Boston Red Sox defeat the Texas Rangers 7-4. Johnny Damon, whose leadoff single extended his career-best hitting streak to 21 games, matches the longest in the majors this season (by Darin Erstad). The 20 grand slams by Ramírez trail only Lou Gehrig's 23 in major league history.
- July 6 – Florida Marlins pitchers are perfect for more than nine innings, and they set a team record with 22 strikeouts. Juan Encarnación's single in the 12th inning gives Florida a 5-4 victory over the Milwaukee Brewers, but it is the Marlins pitchers who steal the show. Starter A. J. Burnett matches his career-high and the team record with 14 strikeouts in six innings and, after J. J. Hardy's RBI single with two outs in the third, Florida pitchers retire the final 28 Milwaukee hitters. Burnett throws 125 pitches in six innings, allowing four runs and four hits while walking five; Jim Mecir pitches the seventh but doesn't have a strikeout; Guillermo Mota strikes out two in the eighth and two in the ninth; Todd Jones strikes out one in the 10th and two in the 11th, and Valerio de los Santos, the game winner, strikes out one in the 12th.
- July 11 – At Comerica Park – a field normally considered a "pitcher's park" – Bobby Abreu wins the Home Run Derby. He sets records with 24 home runs in a single round and 41 overall, topping Miguel Tejada's previous marks of 15 and 27, set a year earlier. Abreu's longest homer is measured at 517 feet.
- July 12 – The American League rolls to a 7-5 victory over the National League in the 76th All-Star Game played at Comerica Park. Baltimore Orioles shortstop Miguel Tejada is named the MVP. Tejada starts the AL offense with a home run in the second inning and drives in another run in the third. Texas' Mark Teixeira and Seattle's Ichiro Suzuki also drive in two runs each for the AL.
- July 14 – The San Francisco Giants defeat their archrivals, the Los Angeles Dodgers, 4-3, for their 10,000th victory in the franchise's history.
- July 15 – Rafael Palmeiro's RBI double off Joel Piñeiro of the Seattle Mariners is his 3,000th career hit. Palmeiro, who also has 566 home runs, joins Hank Aaron, Willie Mays and Eddie Murray as the only players with 3,000 hits and 500 home runs. Palmeiro also ties Robin Yount for 13th on the career list with 583 doubles, as the Baltimore Orioles beat Seattle 6-3.
- July 23 – The San Francisco Giants retire the number 36 in honor of Gaylord Perry.
- July 24 – At SF, A. J. Burnett homers and pitches into the eighth inning for his second straight victory, and Miguel Cabrera belts a home run for the third game in a row to lead the Florida Marlins past the San Francisco Giants 4-1. With 70-year-old Felipe Alou and the 74-year-old Jack McKeon in the dugouts, it marks the first time in North American professional sports history that opposing teams both had managers or coaches 70 or older.
- July 25:
  - The Oakland Athletics defeat the Cleveland Indians 13-4, as Dan Johnson of Oakland is the designated hitter and bats ninth; so did Indians DH Jason Dubois — the first time in major league history each DH was in the last spot in the batting order.
  - At home, the Tampa Bay Devil Rays beat Curt Schilling and the Boston Red Sox, 4-3, on Aubrey Huff's two-out double in the 10th inning. The Red Sox set a major league record to start a season by not playing extra-innings until their 99th game.
- July 26 – Chicago Cubs pitcher Greg Maddux records his 3,000th strikeout against the San Francisco Giants at Wrigley Field becoming just the 12th player to reach the milestone. The batter was Omar Vizquel.
- July 31:
  - The Baseball Hall of Fame inducts its two newest members — Ryne Sandberg and Wade Boggs — in Cooperstown, New York. The Hall also honors Jerry Coleman, recipient of the Ford C. Frick Award for excellence in baseball broadcasting, and Peter Gammons, recipient of the J. G. Taylor Spink Award for baseball writing.
  - The Yankees' Jason Giambi hits the 300th home run of his career.

=== August ===
- August 1 – Rafael Palmeiro is suspended for 10 days due to testing positive for steroids. He would later claim to have received a tainted Vitamin B12 shot from teammate Miguel Tejada.
- August 2 – Ryan Franklin is suspended 10 days for violating Major League Baseball's Joint Drug Prevention and Treatment Program.
- August 3 – Manny Ramírez of the Boston Red Sox becomes the seventh player in major league history to reach 30 home runs and 100 RBI in at least eight straight seasons. The others are Jimmie Foxx, Babe Ruth, Lou Gehrig, Albert Belle, Rafael Palmeiro and Sammy Sosa. Ramírez and Foxx are the only players in Red Sox history with five consecutive 30-homer seasons.
- August 4 – The Baltimore Orioles fire manager Lee Mazzilli with the team mired in an 8-game losing streak and replace him with bench coach Sam Perlozzo for the rest of the season.
- August 5 – Albert Pujols of the St. Louis Cardinals becomes the first major league player to hit 30 home runs in each of his first five seasons. No. 30 comes in the first inning against John Smoltz, and it helps the Cardinals to an 11-3 victory over the visiting Atlanta Braves. Overall, Pujols has hit 190 homers during this five-year span from the start of his career, equaling the total of Eddie Mathews (1952-1956) and with 25 fewer than Ralph Kiner (1946-1950).
- August 7:
  - In just the fourth meeting of pitchers with the same last name since 2000, Víctor Zambrano of the New York Mets outduels Carlos Zambrano of the Chicago Cubs in front of 40,321 fans at Shea Stadium, pitching the Mets to a 6-1 win and a sweep of the three-game series. Both Zambranos entered with 42 career wins, the second time in major league history that opposing starters with the same last name came in with matching victory totals, according to the Elias Sports Bureau. The other was on June 15, 1944, when Red Barrett of the Boston Braves and Dick Barrett of the Philadelphia Phillies each had 19 career wins. Like the Barretts, Víctor and Carlos obviously share a double feat, but the similarities don't end there. The Zambranos were both born in Venezuela, both throw with their right arm, and both wear No. 38. Besides this, it is the fourth time in modern major league history that starting pitchers with a last name beginning with Z faced each other, according to ESPN. Víctor and Carlos Zambrano have both faced Barry Zito of the Oakland Athletics.
  - Zach Duke becomes only the second rookie in Pittsburgh Pirates history to win his first five decisions as a starter, as the Pirates pass the Los Angeles Dodgers 9-4. The 22-year-old is the first Pittsburgh rookie since Whitey Glazner in 1921 to start 5-0. No Pirates rookie has been 6-0. Duke is 5-0 with 35 strikeouts and a 1.52 ERA in 46.2 innings pitched. His 0.87 ERA in July was the lowest among all major league pitchers.
- August 8 – In a doubleheader with the Florida Marlins, the Colorado Rockies start two pitchers with the same surname. This is the first such doubleheader since June 22, 1974, when Gaylord Perry and his brother Jim Perry, both of the Cleveland Indians, accomplished the feat against the Boston Red Sox. Sun-Woo Kim starts the first game, and Byung-hyun Kim starts the second game. The Rockies win both games of the doubleheader.
- August 9 – Down 7-2 in the top of the 9th inning, the Cleveland Indians score 11 runs against the Kansas City Royals to win the game 13-7. With 2 outs, the Royals leading by 1 and a man on base, the Indians' Jeff Liefer hits a routine fly ball to left which is dropped by outfielder Chip Ambres, allowing the tying run to score. Kansas City made 3 errors altogether in the 9th inning. To make matters worse for the Royals, it was their 11th straight loss.
- August 11 – New York Yankees closer Mariano Rivera converts his 31st consecutive save, the last in the longest such streak of his career.
- August 20:
  - 2005 Little League World Series: Kalen Pimentel of Vista, California, representing the West team, strikes out 18 batters in a six-inning game to lead his team over Owensboro, Kentucky, representing the Great Lakes, 7-2.
  - The Kansas City Royals end major league baseball's longest losing streak in 17 years, defeating the Oakland Athletics 2-1 to snap a club-record 19-game skid. The Royals' mark was the longest since the Baltimore Orioles lost an American League-record 21 in a row at the start of the 1988 season. The major league mark since 1900 is 23 straight losses, set by the Philadelphia Phillies in 1961.
- August 28 – Jason Giambi of the New York Yankees collects his 1,500th hit and drives in the 1,000th RBI of his major league career in a 10-3 Yankee win over the Kansas City Royals, finishing a three-game sweep.
- August 31 – Called up from Double-A Carolina, Jeremy Hermida of the Florida Marlins makes a name for himself by becoming the second player in major league history to belt a grand slam in his first at-bat. But it is too late to rally the Marlins, who lose 10-5 to the St. Louis Cardinals at Dolphins Stadium. Pinch-hitting in the seventh inning, Hermida hits his grand slam off Al Reyes on a 1-1 pitch. The Marlins' No. 1 draft pick in 2002, Hermida is a left-handed-hitting outfielder who was a rising star at Double-A before being brought up. The only other player to accomplish the feat was Bill Duggleby of the Philadelphia Phillies on April 21, 1898; Duggleby was the winning pitcher that day.

=== September ===
- September 2 – Vladimir Guerrero hits 300th career home run helping Los Angeles Angels beat Seattle Mariners 4-1.
- September 3 – In a 7-0 Yankee win over the Oakland Athletics, starting pitcher Aaron Small of the New York Yankees records his first career major league complete game shutout.
- September 6 – Texas Rangers slugger Mark Teixeira becomes the fifth player in major league history to hit 100 home runs in his first three seasons, joining Joe DiMaggio, Ralph Kiner, Eddie Mathews and Albert Pujols.
- September 7:
  - Dontrelle Willis earns his 20th win of the year as the Florida Marlins bury the Washington Nationals 12-1 at RFK Stadium. He also delivers at the plate, going 2-for-4, including a double, with one RBI and two runs. Willis is the first Marlin to win 20 games in a season, and the first African American to do it since Oakland's Dave Stewart in 1990. Only 12 African Americans, plus Black Canadian Ferguson Jenkins, have posted 20-win campaigns in major league history.
  - Hideki Matsui hits his 400th professional home run, in the fourth inning of the Yankees' 5-4 win over Tampa Bay. Matsui hit 332 homers for the Yomiuri Giants of Japan's Central League from 1993–2002, and 68 since joining the Yankees in 2003.
- September 9:
  - In his third major league start, rookie Matt Cain of the SF Giants pitches a two-hitter complete game while striking out eight, as the visiting Chicago Cubs lose 2–1. A 20-year-old right-hander, Cain beats another promising young pitcher, Jerome Williams, his former minor league teammate.
  - Pitcher Woody Williams holds the Los Angeles Dodgers hitless through five innings and Ramón Hernández belts a three-run home run in the fourth inning, giving the San Diego Padres a 3-1 victory over Los Angeles. It is the 40th anniversary of the only perfect game by a Dodgers pitcher in franchise history. Hall of Famer Sandy Koufax retired all 27 Chicago Cubs on September 9, 1965, and Lou Johnson had the only hit and run in a 1-0 victory at Dodger Stadium. The Padres have never had a no-hitter.
- September 11 – In his last start of the season, Minnesota Twins pitcher Carlos Silva lasts just one inning, but walks none. In his previous 187.1 innings this year, he walked just nine batters. His ratio of 'walks per 9 innings pitched' (0.4301) sets a modern-era record.
- September 12 – David Ortiz of the Boston Red Sox hits his second game-winning home run in seven days to beat the host Toronto Blue Jays in the 11th inning, 6-5. That homer, Ortiz' second of the night and 40th of the season, allows him to join Carl Yastrzemski as the only players in the 105-year history of the Red Sox to hit 40 home runs in consecutive seasons. Yaz did it in 1969 and 1970. Ortiz also enjoys his eighth multihomer game of the season, two shy of tying a Sox record set by Jimmie Foxx in 1938.
- September 14:
  - Andruw Jones hits his 50th home run, becoming the first major leaguer to reach that mark since 2002, in the Atlanta Braves' 12-4 loss to the Philadelphia Phillies. It is Jones' 300th career homer, and the 28-year-old becomes the 12th player in major league history to reach that milestone before his 30th birthday.
  - David Ortiz continues campaigning for MVP honors, hitting yet another game-winning home run, a two-run shot in the eighth inning, as the Boston Red Sox beat the Toronto Blue Jays 5-3 in the finale of a three-game set at the Rogers Centre. Ortiz has hit three game-deciding home runs in the last nine days – September 6 against the Angels in the bottom of the ninth inning, September 12 against Toronto in the 11th, and today in the eighth. All three have come with the game tied. Ortiz' 42nd homer establishes a career high, eclipsing his 2004 total by one. It is also his 38th homer this year hit out of the DH position, surpassing Edgar Martínez' single-season record of 37 in 2000 with the Seattle Mariners.
- September 15:
  - The St. Louis Cardinals become the first team to clinch a playoff berth this season, running away with the NL Central title division for a second straight season – their fourth title in the last six years. Jeff Suppan allows six hits over eight-plus innings and the Cardinals beat the Chicago Cubs 6–1, in a game called with two outs in the bottom of the ninth after a 58-minute rain delay. The Cardinals moved into first place on April 16 and never left.
  - Staten Island, the Single-A affiliate of the New York Yankees, wins their third New York–Penn League pennant by sweeping the Auburn Doubledays in the championship series.
- September 16 – Barry Bonds of the San Francisco Giants hits his first home run of the season and the 704th of his career. Bonds homers off Los Angeles Dodgers starter Brad Penny in his 11th at-bat after missing most of the year recovering from three operations on his right knee since January 31. Bonds is third on the career HR list, trailing only Babe Ruth (714) and Hank Aaron (755). His first RBI of the season moves him into a ninth-place tie with Carl Yastrzemski with 1,844.
- September 17 – In a game against the Florida Marlins at Dolphins Stadium, the Philadelphia Phillies, trailing 2–0 going into the ninth inning, take advantage of four Marlin errors in the ninth to score 10 runs in the ninth inning. The Phillies go on to win the game 10-2. A blown save during the game snaps Marlins closer Todd Jones' streak of 27 consecutive saves.
- September 18 – The Texas Rangers set a major league record for home runs at home when David Dellucci, Alfonso Soriano and Rod Barajas connect against the Seattle Mariners in an 8-6 victory. Barajas' homer in the fourth inning gives Texas 150 homers at Ameriquest Field, one more than the Colorado Rockies hit at Coors Field in 1996. Mark Teixeira adds two more home runs later in the game to bring Texas' overall home run total to 252, which leads the majors. The Rangers are only 13 homers shy of breaking the major league record of 264 set by Seattle in 1997. Barajas' homer gives the Rangers seven players with at least 20 homers, tying the major league record set by Baltimore in 1996 and matched by Toronto in 2000.
- September 19 – Ian Snell pitches eight strong innings, earning his first major league win, and the Pittsburgh Pirates defeat Roger Clemens and the Houston Astros 7–0 in the opener of a four-game set at PNC Park. Snell, who is making just his fourth start of the season, allows just three hits, strikes out five and walks three, while retiring the final nine batters he faces before José Mesa comes on to complete the four-hit shutout. Clemens has now pitched in every active ball park.
- September 21 – Rafael Furcal of the Atlanta Braves sets a team record with his 187th career stolen base, breaking the mark he shared with Otis Nixon. Hank Aaron holds the franchise record for stolen bases with 240, most of them while the Braves were in Milwaukee.
- September 22:
  - Pitcher Dontrelle Willis bats seventh in the Florida Marlins lineup. No other pitcher has batted seventh since the Montreal Expos' Steve Renko did so against the San Diego Padres on August 26, 1973.
  - The Chicago White Sox, who had led the American League Central by 15 games on August 1, see their lead fall to a game and a half after losing to the Minnesota Twins while the second-place Cleveland Indians defeat the Kansas City Royals. The White Sox had a 69-35 record on August 1 but have gone 22-26 since; meanwhile, Cleveland, 55-51 at the same time, have since gone 35-12. The Indians, however, will get no closer, as the White Sox go on to clinch the division title a week later, avoiding what would have been one of the worst collapses in Major League history.
- September 27:
  - The Atlanta Braves clinch their 14th straight division title thanks to Philadelphia's loss to the New York Mets. Atlanta began their record-setting streak in 1991, when they were in the NL West.
  - The Los Angeles Angels of Anaheim win the AL West title for the second consecutive season with a 4-3 win over the Oakland Athletics. Anaheim led the division or shared the lead for all but five days after the All-Star break.
  - Jimmy Rollins sets a Philadelphia Phillies record by extending his hitting streak to 32 games with a single in the seventh inning of a 3-2 loss to the New York Mets. Rollins breaks Ed Delahanty's record of 31 in a row set in 1899. Rollins' streak is the longest in the majors since Florida's Luis Castillo hit in 35 straight in 2002.
  - Catcher Ramón Hernández hits a go-ahead grand slam and drives in a career-high seven runs to lead the San Diego Padres past the San Francisco Giants 9–6.
- September 28 – Alex Rodriguez of the New York Yankees hits his 47th home run of the season in the 2–1 victory over the Baltimore Orioles. The shot broke the single-season club record for home runs by a right-handed batter, set by Joe DiMaggio in 1937.
- September 29 – The Chicago White Sox clinch their first division title since 2000 with a 4-2 victory over the Detroit Tigers in the AL Central. Chicago has 96 victories, the best record in the American League, and is just the 10th team in the history of baseball to be in first place on every day of the season.

=== October ===
- October 1 – The New York Yankees defeat the Boston Red Sox at Fenway Park by a score of 8–4 to clinch their eighth consecutive American League East title. Yankees captain Derek Jeter gets his 200th hit of the season, and teammate Alex Rodriguez breaks a franchise season record for most home runs by a right-handed batter with his 48th blast.
- October 2:
  - Both wild card berths are clinched on the final day of the regular season. The Boston Red Sox clinch their third straight wild card after the Chicago White Sox defeat the Cleveland Indians 3–1, while the Houston Astros earn their second straight berth with a 6-4 victory over the Chicago Cubs. Boston wins 10–1 over the Yankees, entering a tie for first place in the AL East. The Yankees win their season series with the Red Sox ten games to nine, giving New York the division title and Boston the wild card. The last three World Series champions were wild card entries.
  - Jimmy Rollins of the Philadelphia Phillies extends his hitting streak to 36 games, the ninth longest in major league history, with a fourth-inning single in the regular-season finale against the Washington Nationals. The streak is the longest since 1987, when Paul Molitor hit safely in 39 consecutive games. The old Phillies franchise record of 31 was set by Ed Delahanty in 1899.
  - Florida Marlins manager Jack McKeon tells his team before a 7–6, 10-inning victory over the Atlanta Braves that he will not be back as manager in 2006. McKeon led Florida to the 2003 World Series title and a winning record in each of his three seasons as manager of the club. He began his managerial career in the minors 50 years ago and became the 52nd manager to earn 1,000 major-league wins on September 3.
  - Atlanta's Andruw Jones wins his first NL home run crown with a major league-best 51, three more than the Yankees' Alex Rodriguez, who wins his fourth AL HR title in five seasons. Jones becomes the first player to reach 50 homers since Rodríguez and Jim Thome in 2002. Rodríguez gives the Yankees their first home run champion since Reggie Jackson was co-leader in 1980. Houston's Roger Clemens leads the major leagues in ERA for the first time since 1990 after posting a 1.87 mark. Derrek Lee of the Chicago Cubs and Michael Young of the Texas Rangers win their first batting titles with .335 and .331 respectively. Boston's David Ortiz (148) and Atlanta's Andruw Jones (128) lead in RBI.
- October 4:
  - The St. Louis Cardinals beat the San Diego Padres 8–5 to take the first game of their National League Division Series. Reggie Sanders sets an NLDS record with six RBI, including the third grand slam in Cardinals postseason history in the fifth inning.
  - The Chicago White Sox rout the Boston Red Sox 14–2 to take the first game of their American League Division Series. The White Sox have an ALDS record-setting five home runs.
- October 5:
  - Tadahito Iguchi hits a go-ahead, three-run home run after a deflating error by Boston Red Sox second baseman Tony Graffanino, and the Chicago White Sox rally for a 5–4 victory to take a 2-0 lead against the defending World Series champions in their ALDS.
  - Morgan Ensberg has five RBI and Craig Biggio is in the middle of just about every rally, leading the Houston Astros past the Atlanta Braves 10–5 in Game One of their National League Division Series. Andy Pettitte overcomes two home runs to join Atlanta's John Smoltz as the winningest pitcher in major league postseason history.
- October 6:
  - In his first postseason at-bat, Brian McCann hits a three-run homer off seven-time Cy Young Award winner Roger Clemens, sending John Smoltz and the Atlanta Braves to a 7–1 victory over the Houston Astros, tying their best-of-five NLDS at one game apiece. Another of the 18 rookies to play for the Braves this season, McCann was less than three months old when Clemens made his major league debut for the Boston Red Sox in 1984. Smoltz breaks a one-day tie with Houston's Andy Pettitte to reclaim the title as the major leagues' winningest postseason pitcher, improving to 7-0 in the division series and 15-4 overall.
  - Baseball fans recognize the 2005 accomplishments of Cincinnati Reds outfielder Ken Griffey Jr. and New York Yankees first baseman Jason Giambi, voting them Comeback Players of the Year. Following four years of serious injuries, Griffey hit .301 with 35 home runs and 92 RBI. Giambi led the American League with a .440 on-base percentage and 108 walks, finishing eighth with a .535 slugging percentage, and hit .271 with 32 homers and 87 RBI. In 2004 Giambi suffered several ailments, and was also dogged by the BALCO steroids scandal. The award was voted on for the first time by fans on MLB.com. This was the first year that the league had officially sanctioned the award. Six players from each league were nominated by the editorial staff at MLB.com and representatives of the league.
- October 7: The Chicago White Sox complete a three-game sweep of the defending champion Boston Red Sox with a 5-3 victory.
- October 8: The St. Louis Cardinals chase former teammate Woody Williams before he can get out of the second inning in a 7–3 victory that completes a three-game sweep of the San Diego Padres. Matt Morris holds the Padres hitless for 4 1/3 innings, David Eckstein hits his first career postseason home run, and Reggie Sanders drives in two more runs to set an NLDS record with 10. Jason Isringhausen earns his 10th career postseason save as St. Louis advances to the National League Championship Series for the fourth time in six years.
- October 9: In what will go down as a true classic post-season game, rookie Chris Burke hits a walk-off home run in the 18th inning as the Houston Astros defeat the Atlanta Braves 7–6 in a record-setting NLDS Game Four in extra innings. The game sets several records, including longest postseason game ever at 18 innings, longest postseason game by time (5 hours, 50 minutes), and first postseason game with two grand slams. The Astros' 23 players used tie an all-time post-season record as well. Houston will now advance to the National League Championship Series for the second year in a row to face the 2004 NL Champion St. Louis Cardinals.
- October 10: Rookie Ervin Santana pitches 5 1/3 strong innings in his postseason debut, Garret Anderson hits a home run and drives in two runs, and Adam Kennedy hits a go-ahead two-run triple, to lead the Angels over the New York Yankees 5–3 in the decisive Game Five of their Division Series.
- October 11: Well-rested, playing in front of a sold-out home crowd and with their top pitcher José Contreras on the mound against a road-weary team, the Chicago White Sox have everything lined up for a quick start in the American League Championship Series, but lose to the Los Angeles Angels 3–2 in Game 1. The Angels traveled about 4,700 miles in a 32-hour span, becoming the first team in major league history to play three games in three cities on successive nights, according to the Elias Sports Bureau. The Angels lost Game 4 of the American League Division Series in New York on Sunday, won Game 5 in Anaheim on Monday and wiped out the White Sox' home-field advantage in the ALCS in Chicago on Tuesday.
- October 12: The Chicago White Sox win Game 2 of the American League Championship Series in controversial fashion to even the series at 1-1. With two outs in the bottom of the ninth, Chicago catcher A. J. Pierzynski strikes out swinging, seemingly sending the game to extra innings, but home plate umpire Doug Eddings rules that the ball hit the ground before Angels catcher Josh Paul caught it, allowing Pierzynski to run to first base, which he easily is able to do as both Paul and pitcher Kelvim Escobar believed the inning was over and were heading off the field. After a delay while Eddings consulted with third-base umpire Ed Rapuano, the call was upheld and Pablo Ozuna was sent in to pinch-run for Pierzynski. Joe Crede then doubled to drive in Ozuna with the winning run.
- October 15: In the ALCS, Freddy García continues the powerful pitching parade that has guided the Chicago White Sox to a 3-1 lead in the best-of-seven series by tossing a complete game as the Los Angeles Angels are defeated 8–2. Paul Konerko has a three-run home run off Ervin Santana in the first inning, the second straight game in which he had gone deep in the first. García joins Jon Garland and Mark Buehrle to give the White Sox a formidable streak of three consecutive complete games. It is the first time a team had pitched three consecutive complete games in the postseason since Tom Seaver, Jon Matlack and Jerry Koosman did it for the New York Mets during the 1973 NLCS against the Cincinnati Reds.
- October 16: The Chicago White Sox clinch the American League pennant with a 6–3 victory over the Los Angeles Angels in Game 5 of the ALCS. José Contreras becomes the fourth consecutive White Sox pitcher to throw a complete game, the first time that has happened since the 1956 New York Yankees beat the Brooklyn Dodgers behind five straight complete games from Whitey Ford, Tom Sturdivant, Don Larsen (who pitched a perfect game), Bob Turley and Johnny Kucks. Paul Konerko is named ALCS MVP. This is the White Sox' first trip to the World Series since 1959.
- October 19 – In Game Six of the NLCS, the Houston Astros earn their first World Series berth in 44 years of team history with a 5–1 victory over the St. Louis Cardinals. For the Cardinals, the loss marks the end of the season for the team that led the majors with 100 wins. It also is the final game at Busch Stadium, scheduled to be demolished by a wrecking ball to make room for St. Louis' new ballpark.
- October 25 – In the first World Series game played in the state of Texas, former Astro Geoff Blum wins the longest game in WS history with a tiebreaking two-out solo home run as the Chicago White Sox beat the Houston Astros 7–5 at Minute Maid Park to move within a win of a sweep and their first title since 1917. The 14-inning marathon lasts a total of five hours and 41 minutes. The previous longest game was 4:51 when the New York Yankees beat the New York Mets in 12 innings in Game One in 2000. This matches the longest by innings, a Babe Ruth complete game for the Boston Red Sox against the Brooklyn Robins in Game Two of the 1916 WS (at 2:32). The 43 players used by both teams also are a Series record, as are the combined 17 pitchers and 30 runners left on base.
- October 26 – In the World Series, the Chicago White Sox complete a sweep of the Houston Astros with a 1–0 victory in Game Four. Freddy García pitches seven shutout innings, and Series MVP Jermaine Dye connects an RBI single off Brad Lidge in the eighth for the only run of the game, as Juan Uribe adds strong defensive support at shortstop. García becomes the first Venezuelan starting pitcher to win a World Series game. He also accomplishes the feat with good friend and fellow countryman Ozzie Guillén at the helm, who manages the White Sox to earn their first World Championship since 1917.

=== November ===
- November 14 – Alex Rodriguez of the New York Yankees beats out David Ortiz of the Boston Red Sox to win his 2nd career MVP Award, becoming the first Yankee to win the honor since Don Mattingly in 1985.
- November 15 – Albert Pujols of the St. Louis Cardinals wins his first career MVP Award, becoming the first Cardinal to win the honor since Willie McGee in 1985.
- November 24 – On Thanksgiving evening, the Boston Red Sox officially announce the acquisition of pitcher Josh Beckett and third baseman Mike Lowell from the Florida Marlins. Boston also add reliever Guillermo Mota in the deal, while sending minor league prospects shortstop Hanley Ramírez and pitchers Aníbal Sánchez, Jesús Delgado and Harvey García to the Marlins.
- November 28 – Toronto Blue Jays general manager J. P. Ricciardi signs former Baltimore Orioles closer B. J. Ryan to the richest contract ever for a reliever in a five-year, $47 million deal.

=== December ===
- December 6 – First baseman John Olerud retires from baseball after playing 17 seasons in the majors.

== Books ==
- The Ferrell Brothers in Baseball

== Movies ==
- Bad News Bears
- Fever Pitch
- Game 6

== Births ==
=== January ===
- January 10 – Noble Meyer

=== February ===
- February 19 – Walker Jenkins

=== April ===
- April 7 – Roch Cholowsky

=== May ===
- May 24 – Josue De Paula
- May 28 – Ralphy Velazquez

=== June ===
- June 2 – George Lombard Jr.
- June 17 – Didier Fuentes

=== July ===
- July 20 – Colt Emerson

=== October ===
- October 16 – Arjun Nimmala

== Deaths ==
=== January ===
- January 4 – Marguerite Pearson, 72, shortstop who played from 1948 through 1954 in the All-American Girls Professional Baseball League.
- January 4 – Jack Sanford, 88, reserve first baseman for the Washington Senators in the 1940s.
- January 7 – Harry Boyles, 93, pitcher for the Chicago White Sox, 1938–1939.
- January 10 – Bob Mabe, 75, pitcher for the St. Louis Cardinals, Cincinnati Reds and Baltimore Orioles, 1958–1960.
- January 10 – Tommy Fine, 90, pitcher, briefly with the Red Sox and Browns, who in 1952 threw the only no-hitter in Caribbean World Series history.
- January 21 – Rita Keller, 72, All-American Girls Professional Baseball League player.
- January 21 – Corky Valentine, 76, pitcher for the Reds, 1954–1955.
- January 22 – César Gutiérrez, 61, Venezuelan shortstop who with the 1970 Tigers became one of three players in major league history with a 7-for-7 game.
- January 31 – Bill Voiselle, 86, right-hander who appeared in 245 games for the New York Giants (1942–1947), Boston Braves (1947–1949) and Chicago Cubs (1950), who won 21 games, led NL in strikeouts and innings pitched, and was named an All-Star in 1944 while still officially a rookie; known for wearing uniform number honoring his hometown, Ninety-Six, South Carolina.

=== February ===
- February 4 – Luis Sánchez, 51, Venezuelan relief pitcher for the Angels who led the team in saves in 1983 and 1984.
- February 6 – Mutsuo Minagawa, 69, submarine pitcher for the Nankai Hawks in Nippon Professional Baseball from 1954 to 1971, who was the last Japanese pitcher to win 30 or more games in a single season.
- February 8 – Mike Bishop, 46, backup catcher who played briefly for the New York Mets in 1983.
- February 10 – Ruth Williams, 78, pitcher who played from 1946 through 1953 in the All-American Girls Professional Baseball League.
- February 11 – Rankin Johnson, 87, relief pitcher who appeared in seven early-season games for 1941 Philadelphia Athletics; later a long-time minor league baseball executive.
- February 13 – Nelson Briles, 61, pitcher who won 19 games for the 1968 St. Louis Cardinals and pitched a two-hitter for the Pittsburgh Pirates in the 1971 World Series, and later a broadcaster.
- February 22 – Ben Huffman, 90, long-time scout for the Chicago White Sox who signed Minnie Miñoso and Harold Baines; elected to Major League Baseball Scouts Association Hall of Fame in 1990; in his playing days, a left-swinging catcher who batted .273 in 76 games for 1937 St. Louis Browns.
- February 25 – Nick Colosi, 79, Sicilian-born National League umpire from 1968 to 1982, who made controversial balk call against Luis Tiant in Game 1 of the 1975 World Series.

=== March ===
- March 2 – Rick Mahler, 51, pitcher for the Atlanta Braves (1979–1988 and 1991), Cincinnati Reds (1989–1990) and Montreal Expos (1991); won 17 games in 1985 and threw three Opening Day shutouts; member of 1990 World Series champions; brother of Mickey Mahler.
- March 6 – Danny Gardella, 85, left fielder for the 1944–1945 New York Giants who was the first major leaguer to challenge baseball's reserve clause in court; "jumped" to outlaw Mexican League in 1946 and suspended from Organized Baseball, but was reinstated in 1950, when he appeared in one game for the St. Louis Cardinals.
- March 6 – Chuck Thompson, 83, broadcaster for the Baltimore Orioles for nearly 50 years, who also worked with the Washington Senators, Philadelphia Athletics and Philadelphia Phillies.
- March 10 – Kent Hadley, 70, first baseman for the Kansas City Athletics and New York Yankees 1958–1960, and one of the players who was part of the trade that brought Roger Maris to the Yankees.
- March 13 – Frank House, 75, catcher, primarily for the Detroit Tigers, who peaked with 15 home runs and 53 RBI in 1955.
- March 16 – Dick Radatz, 67, All-Star relief pitcher for the Boston Red Sox who had over 20 saves in each of his first four seasons, leading the American League twice.
- March 22 – Theresa Kobuszewski, 84, All-American Girls Professional Baseball League player and World War II veteran.
- March 26 – Marius Russo, 90, All-Star pitcher for the New York Yankees (1939–1943, 1946) who hurled complete game, 2–1 victories in both the 1941 and 1943 World Series.
- March 27 – Bob Casey, 79, Minnesota Twins public address announcer for all of their 44 years.

=== April ===
- April 7 – Bob Kennedy, 84, outfielder and third baseman for five MLB clubs over 16 seasons between 1939 and 1957 who became "head coach" (1963 to June 13, 1965) and general manager (November 24, 1976 to May 22, 1981) of the Chicago Cubs; hit first grand slam in modern Orioles history (July 30, 1954); also the Oakland Athletics' first manager (1968).
- April 8 – Al Gettel, 87, pitched in seven seasons for six teams from 1945 to 1955.
- April 8 – Eddie Miksis, 78, infielder for 14 seasons from 1944 to 1958, primarily with the Dodgers and Cubs; debuted with the Dodgers at age 17.
- April 13 – Don Blasingame, 73, second baseman who appeared in 1,444 games for five MLB clubs between 1955 and 1966; 1958 National League All-Star; later managed Hiroshima and Hanshin teams in Japan.
- April 18 – Agapito Mayor, 89, Cuban professional pitcher who won more than 250 games while playing in Cuba, Mexico and the minor leagues, as well as a record holder in international tournaments.
- April 21 – Ed Butka, 89, first baseman who played 18 games for the wartime 1943–1944 Washington Senators.
- April 23 – Earl Wilson, 70, pitcher for the Boston Red Sox (1959–1960 and 1962–1966), Detroit Tigers (1966–1970) and San Diego Padres (1970) who won 22 games in 1967; first black pitcher to throw a major league no-hitter (1962); member, 1968 World Series champions.
- April 28 – Pancho Herrera, 70, Cuban-born first baseman for the 1958–1961 Phillies; hit .281 with 17 home runs and 71 RBI in 1960.

=== May ===
- May 6 – Lee Stine, 91, pitcher, mainly for the 1936 Reds, who gave up Lou Gehrig's 14th career grand slam while with the White Sox.
- May 10 – John Jachym, 87, the second-largest shareholder in the Washington Senators from December 1949 through June 22, 1950.
- May 10 – Vic Johnson, 84, pitcher for the Red Sox (1944–1945) and Indians (1946).
- May 10 – Hal Griggs, 76, pitcher for the Senators 1956–1959; ended Ted Williams' streak of reaching base in 16 consecutive plate appearances on September 24, 1957.
- May 26 – Chico Carrasquel, 77, Venezuelan shortstop for the White Sox and Indians who became the first Latin American All-Star; later a broadcaster in his native country.
- May 30 – Alma Ziegler, 87, three-time All-Star second basewoman and pitcher who set several records in the All-American Girls Professional Baseball League.
- May 30 – Juan Pedro Villamán, 46, Spanish-language Red Sox broadcaster since 1995.

=== June ===
- June 6 – Rogers Badgett, 87, Kentucky coal and construction magnate; key limited partner in Red Sox ownership group from 1978 to 1985.
- June 14 – Bob Lennon, 76, outfielder who played briefly for the Giants (1954, 1956) and Cubs (1957); hit 64 home runs for Nashville of the Southern Association in 1954.
- June 15 – Carroll Sembera, 63, relief pitcher for the Astros (1965–1967) and Expos (1969–1970); longtime scout.
- June 22 – Roberto Olivo, 91, legendary Venezuelan umpire who worked in 29 Venezuelan league seasons, two Baseball World Cups, and 11 Caribbean Series.
- June 24 – Lyman Bostock, 87, first baseman in the Negro leagues for the Brooklyn Royal Giants and Birmingham Black Barons in the 1930s and 1940s, and father of former Major League outfielder Lyman Bostock.
- June 28 – Dick Dietz, 63, All-Star catcher for the Giants who was controversially denied first base after being hit by a Don Drysdale pitch in 1968, extending Drysdale's streak of scoreless innings.
- June 28 – Steve Reich, 34, pitcher in the Baltimore Orioles minor league system who was killed in action while on a rescue mission in Afghanistan.
- June 30 – Al Milnar, 91, pitcher for the Cleveland Indians (1936 and 1938–1943), St. Louis Browns (1943 and 1946) and Philadelphia Phillies (1946); went 18–10 with a 3.27 ERA in 1940 and was named to the American League All-Star team.

=== July ===
- July 13 – Mickey Owen, 89, catcher for four MLB teams (1937–1945, 1949–1951 and 1954); four-time National League All-Star (1941–1944), but best known as a Brooklyn Dodger for a dropped third strike in the 1941 World Series; suspended for "jumping" to the Mexican League as a player-manager in 1946; after reinstatement in 1949, he later became a coach and scout, and operated a baseball school in Missouri for many years.
- July 14 – Dick Sipek, 82, outfielder for the 1945 Reds; one of only four deaf players to play Major League Baseball.
- July 30 – Ray Cunningham, 100, reserve third baseman for the 1931–32 Cardinals, and the oldest living major leaguer at the time of his death.

=== August ===
- August 1 – John Alevizos, 85, Boston-based businessman whose baseball career included stints as owner of the minor-league Manchester (New Hampshire) Yankees, vice president/administration of the Boston Red Sox, and general manager of the Atlanta Braves between 1969 and 1976.
- August 8 – Gene Mauch, 79, winningest manager (1,901 victories) in major league history who never won a pennant, falling achingly short with the Philadelphia Phillies in 1964 and California Angels in 1982 and 1986; known for emphasis on fundamentals, also managed Montreal Expos (first in their history) and Minnesota Twins; in his playing days, a utility infielder for six MLB clubs over nine seasons between 1944 and 1957.
- August 11 – Ted Radcliffe, 103, All-Star pitcher and catcher of the Negro leagues who played for more than 15 teams between the late 1920s and the early 1950s.
- August 17 – Dottie Hunter, 89, Canadian first basewoman and chaperone, who participated in all 12 seasons for the All-American Girls Professional Baseball League.
- August 30 – Eli Hodkey, 87, left-handed hurler who got into two games for the Philadelphia Phillies in September 1946.

=== September ===
- September 10 – Charlie Williams, 61, umpire from 1982 to 2000, mainly in the National League, who in 1993 became the first black umpire to work home plate in the World Series.
- September 11 – Chris Schenkel, 82, nationally known TV sportscaster whose baseball work including serving as lead announcer for the ABC Game of the Week in 1965.
- September 16 – John McMullen, 87, owner of the Houston Astros from 1979 to 1992, during which time the team made its first three playoff appearances.
- September 17 – Donn Clendenon, 70, first baseman for four NL teams who was the MVP of the Mets' 1969 World Series victory, hitting three home runs.
- September 18 – Marv Grissom, 87, pitcher for the New York and San Francisco Giants (1946, 1953–1958) and four other teams; he was 10-7 with 19 saves and 2.35 ERA and an All-Star for the World Series champion 1954 Giants; later, a pitching coach for four MLB clubs.
- September 20 – Joe Bauman, 83, first baseman in the minor leagues whose 72 home runs for the 1954 Roswell Rockets were an organized baseball record until 2001; retired with 337 career minor league home runs.
- September 22 – Monty Basgall, 83, second baseman for the Pirates (1948, 1949, 1951); served as infield coach for the Dodgers from 1973 to 1986.
- September 22 – Mike Ulicny, 87, catcher with the 1945 Boston Braves; longtime minor league player (1938–1950).
- September 24 – Byron "Mex" Johnson, 94, shortstop for the 1937–1940 Negro league Kansas City Monarchs and Satchel Paige All-Stars.
- September 24 – Frank Smith, 77, relief pitcher for the Reds (1950–1954, 1956) and Cardinals (1955).

=== October ===
- October 2 – Pat Kelly, 61, All-Star outfielder for five AL teams who stole 30 bases three times and batted .364 in the 1979 ALCS with the Orioles.
- October 9 – Tom Cheek, 66, Toronto Blue Jays play-by-play announcer from the team's formation in 1977 through 2004.
- October 12 – Mike Naymick, 89, relief pitcher for the Indians (1939, 1940, 1943, 1944) and Browns (1944).
- October 13 – Theda Marshall, 80, who played first base from 1947 to 1948 in the All-American Girls Professional Baseball League.
- October 15 – Al Widmar, 80, pitcher for the Red Sox, Browns and White Sox; became a minor league manager and pitching coach with the Phillies and Blue Jays.
- October 18 – Bill King, 78, legendary Bay Area sportscaster and radio voice of the Oakland Athletics for 25 years (1981–2005); earlier the #3 announcer for the San Francisco Giants working with Russ Hodges and Lon Simmons; handled play-by-play for the AFL/NFL Raiders (including their 13 years in Los Angeles), NBA Warriors, and NCAA University of California Bears' football and men's basketball squads.
- October 18 – Hal Lebovitz, 89, sportswriter for the Cleveland News and Plain Dealer for over 40 years; also wrote for The Sporting News.
- October 19 – Bob Carpenter, 87, starting pitcher for the Giants (1940–1942, 1946–1947) and Cubs (1947); went 11–10 with a 3.15 ERA for the 1942 Giants.
- October 22 – Ted Bonda, 88, former owner of the Indians (1975–1978) who hired Frank Robinson as Major League Baseball's first African American manager.
- October 23 – Harry Dalton, 77, general manager of the Baltimore Orioles, California Angels and Milwaukee Brewers from 1966 to 1991; five of his teams played in the World Series.
- October 28 – Bob Broeg, 87, sportswriter for the St. Louis Post-Dispatch and The Sporting News from 1945 to 1995.
- October 30 – Bob Allen, 91, pitcher who worked in three games for 1937 Philadelphia Phillies.
- October 30 – Al López, 97, Hall of Famer who set a major league record for career games as a catcher (1,918) in 1928 and from 1930 to 1947, almost entirely in the NL; then managed the Cleveland Indians (1951–1956) and Chicago White Sox (1957–1965, 1968–1969) to AL pennants in 1954 and 1959 — the only non-Yankee AL champs between 1949 and 1964.

=== November ===
- November 16 – Sandalio (Sandy) Consuegra, 85, Cuban-born pitcher for the Senators (1950–1952), White Sox (1953–1956), Orioles (1956–1957) and Giants (1957); posted a 16-3 record as an All-Star with the White Sox in 1954.
- November 25 – Mal Mallette, 83, southpaw hurler who worked in two games for the Brooklyn Dodgers in September 1950.
- November 29 – Vic Power, 78, Puerto Rican All-Star first baseman for the Athletics, Indians, Twins, Angels and Phillies who won seven Gold Gloves, batted .300 three times and led AL in triples in 1958; stole home twice in one game for the Indians against the Tigers in 1958.

=== December ===
- December 3 – Herb Moford, 77, pitcher for four MLB teams, most notably the 1958 Tigers.
- December 3 – Roy Valdés, 85, Cuban-born catcher who went hitless in his lone at-bat as a pinch hitter for the 1944 Washington Senators.
- December 5 – Billy Reed, 83, second baseman who appeared in 15 games for the 1952 Boston Braves.
- December 14 – Stew Bowers, 80, pitcher for the Boston Red Sox from 1935 through 1937.
- December 21 – Elrod Hendricks, 64, catcher (1968–1986 and 1978–1979) and longtime coach (1978–2005) for the Baltimore Orioles; batted .364 and made a disputed defensive play at home plate in Game 1 of 1970 World Series; won World Series rings that season and in 1983.
- December 24 – Xavier (Mr. X) Rescigno, 92, pitcher for the 1943–1945 Pirates.
- December 29 – Dan Carnevale, 87, who spent 63 years in professional baseball but only one season in an MLB uniform, as a coach for 1970 Kansas City Royals; longtime scout and former minor league outfielder and manager.
