= Matt Clement =

American baseball player (born 1974)

- Pitcher
- Born: August 12, 1974 (age 51); Butler, Pennsylvania, U.S.
- Batted: Right Threw: Right

MLB debut
- September 6, 1998, for the San Diego Padres

Last MLB appearance
- June 14, 2006, for the Boston Red Sox

MLB statistics
- Win–loss record: 87–86
- Earned run average: 4.47
- Strikeouts: 1,217
- Stats at Baseball Reference

Teams
- San Diego Padres (1998–2000); Florida Marlins (2001); Chicago Cubs (2002–2004); Boston Red Sox (2005–2006)

Career highlights and awards
- All-Star (2005)

Matthew Paul Clement (born August 12, 1974) is an American former professional baseball starting pitcher. He played in Major League Baseball (MLB) for the San Diego Padres (1998–2000), Florida Marlins (2001), Chicago Cubs (2002–2004) and Boston Red Sox (2005–2006). He batted and threw right-handed.

Clement had a sinking fastball in the low 90s and a hard slider he mixed with a four-seamer and a changeup. In nine seasons, Clement won 87 games and lost 86, and was 1–2 in postseason play, going 1–1 with the Cubs in 2003 and 0–1 with Boston in 2005. His win in Game 4 of the 2003 National League Championship Series at Florida brought the Cubs within one game of the pennant. He held opposing batters to a .233 batting average from 2002 to 2005, while posting a 47–42 record and a 3.99 ERA.

== Baseball career ==
In 2000, Clement led the major leagues in walks (125) and led the National League in wild pitches three times between 2000 and 2003.

In June 2004, Clement was 6-2 and a candidate to be named to the All-Star Game. But in his next six starts before the break, Clement went 0–4 despite a 2.15 ERA during that span; his run support in those starts was just 1.19 runs per game. He finished the season with a 3.68 ERA but went 9-13 for the Cubs, who scored only 79 runs in his 30 starts (2.63 runs of support per game, the sixth-lowest mark in the NL). Against American League teams in inter-league play, Clement had a 7–7 record with a 3.60 ERA in 19 starts.

As a member of the Boston Red Sox in the 2005 season, Clement was named as an All-Star Game selection for the first time in his big league career, replacing injured Blue Jays pitcher Roy Halladay. Clement's record was 10–2 before the All-Star break, and he finished the season at 13–6 with a 4.57 ERA. On July 26, 2005, Clement was struck in the head by a line drive from Carl Crawford of the Tampa Bay Devil Rays.

Clement made just 12 starts in 2006, posting a 5–5 record with a 6.61 ERA, before having season ending shoulder surgery in September. He was rehabilitated at the Red Sox extended spring training complex in Fort Myers, Florida, but did not make a major league appearance in the 2007 season.

On January 3, 2008, Clement was signed to a major league contract with the St. Louis Cardinals. The Cardinals' team doctor said that Clement was healthy and would be able to begin the season playing regularly. The Cardinals cited his recent rehabilitation and physical as reasons for adding him to the starting rotation for the 2008 season with no expected limitations upon reporting to Jupiter, Florida for spring training. However, Clement would begin the year on the disabled list after making no appearances in Spring training. On June 3, Clement made a minor-league rehab start at Single-A Palm Beach, allowing only one hit over six innings. He was released by the Cardinals on August 2.

Clement signed a minor league contract with the Toronto Blue Jays on December 12, 2008, and was invited to Spring training.

After being unable to make a spot in the rotation, Clement announced his retirement from baseball on April 5, 2009.

== Personal life ==
As of 2005, Clement identified as an evangelical Christian.

After retiring from baseball, Clement permanently moved back to his hometown of Butler, Pennsylvania, where he became the head coach of the boys' basketball team at his high school alma mater, Butler Senior High School. He also was part of an ownership group that purchased the Butler BlueSox.

== See also ==
- List of Major League Baseball career hit batsmen leaders
