= Byron Johnson (baseball) =

- Shortstop
- Born: September 16, 1911; Little Rock, Arkansas, U.S.
- Died: September 24, 2005 (aged 94); Colorado, U.S.
- Batted: Right Threw: Right
- Stats at Baseball Reference

Teams
- Kansas City Monarchs (1937–1940)

Byron Emmerson Johnson (September 16, 1911 – September 24, 2005), also known as Mex Johnson, was an American professional baseball player in the Negro leagues. His nickname came from a hat he wore as a child which looked like a sombrero.

Born in Little Rock, Arkansas, United States, he began his Negro leagues career in 1937 as a shortstop with the Kansas City Monarchs and stayed with the Monarchs until his retirement in 1940. He also was on the road team the Monarchs called the Satchel Paige All Stars from 1939 to 1940.

Johnson accomplishments as a player included being selected as a member of the Negro leagues East-West All-Star team in 1938.

The Negro League Baseball museum, located in Kansas City, Mo, used to have a sculpture that was set out which was his hands holding a bat. Many thought that was the hands of Buck O’Neil, another more well-known player, but it was Mr. Johnson’s.

He was drafted into the U.S. Army in 1941 to fight in World War II and served in Europe until 1945.
