= Chip Ambres =

American baseball player (born 1979)

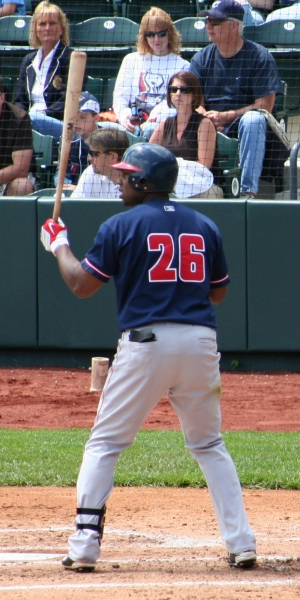
- Ambres with the Pawtucket Red Sox in 2009
- Outfielder
- Born: December 19, 1979 (age 46); Beaumont, Texas, U.S.
- Batted: Right Threw: Right

MLB debut
- July 20, 2005, for the Kansas City Royals

Last MLB appearance
- September 28, 2008, for the San Diego Padres

MLB statistics
- Batting average: .233
- Home runs: 4
- Runs batted in: 10
- Stats at Baseball Reference

Teams
- Kansas City Royals (2005); New York Mets (2007); San Diego Padres (2008)

Raymond Payne "Chip" Ambres (born December 19, 1979) is an American former right-handed Major League Baseball outfielder.

== Florida Marlins ==
Ambres was born in Beaumont, Texas. As a senior at West Brook Senior High School in Beaumont, Texas, Ambres was named a second team All-American by Baseball America, a USA Today All-USA high school baseball team member, and was a highly recruited quarterback. Ambres signed a National Letter of Intent to play football at Texas A&M University, but opted for baseball after he was selected 27th overall by the Florida Marlins in the 1998 Major League Baseball draft and offered a $1.5 million signing bonus.

In 2000, Ambres was named the No. 6 prospect in the Marlins organization by Baseball America. He was unable to make the majors with the Marlins, becoming a six-year minor league free agent at the end of the 2004 season, his second at the AA level.

== Boston Red Sox ==
On December 21, 2004 Ambres signed a minor league contract with the Boston Red Sox. On July 19, 2005, they traded him, along with minor leaguer Juan Cedeno, to the Kansas City Royals in exchange for Tony Graffanino.

== Kansas City Royals ==
Ambres did not break into the Major Leagues until he was with his third organization, the Kansas City Royals. One day after being acquired from the Red Sox, he made his Major League debut at Jacobs Field in Cleveland against the Indians, going 2-for-4 with a double.

Ambres' 2005 rookie campaign was his best and most active season to-date. He finished 2005 with a batting average of .241 with four home runs and nine RBI in 53 games.

Ambres struggled with the Royals' AAA-franchise Omaha in 2006 and did not appear in any games with the parent club, becoming a free agent in October.

== New York Mets ==
On December 27, 2006, the New York Mets signed Ambres to a minor league contract .

Ambres was called up on July 17, 2007 and had the game-winning hit on July 22, his first Major League hit since 2005. Exactly one week later, Ambres was designated for assignment to clear a roster spot for Damion Easley who returned from the bereavement list. He was assigned to Triple-A New Orleans and finished the season there. Following the 2007 season, he became a free agent once again.

== San Diego Padres ==
On November 19, 2007, he signed a minor league contract with San Diego and was invited to 2008 spring training.

Ambres was called up on July 8, 2008 for a game against the Florida Marlins. On July 26, Ambres was designated for assignment and outrighted to the minors on August 1 after clearing waivers. The Padres brought him back on September 2. Ambres elected to become a free agent after the end of the season after being outrighted to the minors once again.

== Boston Red Sox again ==
On January 24, 2009 Ambres signed a minor league deal with the Boston Red Sox.

== New York Mets again ==
On June 10, 2009 the New York Mets acquired Chip Ambres from the Boston Red Sox as part of a conditional deal. The veteran outfielder was assigned to the Buffalo Bisons, where he finished the season and his professional playing career. In parts of 11 minor league seasons, Ambres batted .259/.358/.436, slugging 125 HR and stealing 175 bases.
