= Mark Bellhorn =

American baseball player (born 1974)

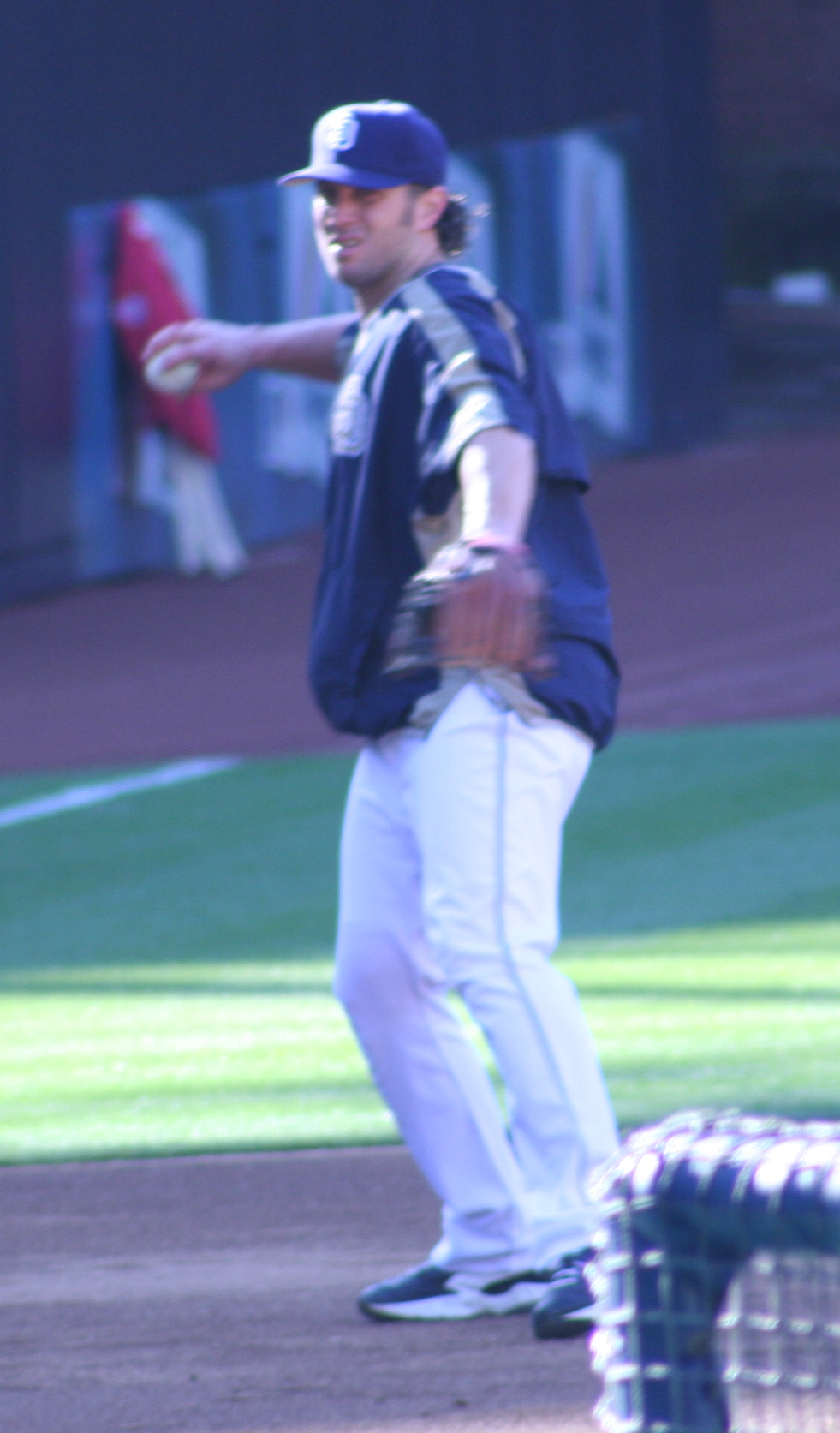
- Bellhorn with the San Diego Padres in 2006
- Second baseman / Third baseman
- Born: August 23, 1974 (age 50); Boston, Massachusetts, U.S.
- Batted: Switch Threw: Right

MLB debut
- June 10, 1997, for the Oakland Athletics

Last MLB appearance
- September 30, 2007, for the Cincinnati Reds

MLB statistics
- Batting average: .230
- Home runs: 69
- Runs batted in: 246
- Stats at Baseball Reference

Teams
- Oakland Athletics (1997–1998, 2000–2001); Chicago Cubs (2002–2003); Colorado Rockies (2003); Boston Red Sox (2004–2005); New York Yankees (2005); San Diego Padres (2006); Cincinnati Reds (2007)

Career highlights and awards
- World Series champion (2004)

Mark Christian Bellhorn (born August 23, 1974) is an American former professional baseball infielder. In his ten-year Major League Baseball (MLB) career, Bellhorn was best known for being the starting second baseman for the Boston Red Sox during their 2004 World Series championship season.

== Career ==
=== Auburn University ===
Bellhorn was drafted out of high school in the 37th round of the 1992 Free Agent Draft by the San Diego Padres, but did not sign. Instead, he attended Auburn University, where he played in the 1994 College World Series. In 1993, he played collegiate summer baseball with the Cotuit Kettleers of the Cape Cod Baseball League.

=== Oakland Athletics ===
After playing college ball at Auburn, Bellhorn broke into the majors with the Oakland Athletics in 1997, drafted in the second round. That year he managed a .228 batting average with six home runs and 19 runs batted in. Over the next three seasons with the Athletics he saw only limited playing time, batting .131 with one homer and five RBI.

=== Chicago Cubs ===
In 2002, Bellhorn was traded to the Chicago Cubs and hit .258 with 27 home runs and 56 RBI.

On August 29, 2002, Bellhorn became the first player in National League history to hit a home run from both sides of the plate in the same inning, doing so in the Cubs' ten–run 4th inning at Miller Park. Bellhorn also tied a team record with five RBI in the inning. His 2002 campaign was a record-setting season for the Cubs: his 27 home runs was the most-ever by a Cubs switch-hitter, and he became the first player in Cubs history to hit a home run from all four infield positions.

On June 20, 2003, he was traded to the Colorado Rockies, and finished the year hitting .221 with two home runs and 26 RBI.

=== Boston Red Sox ===
In 2004, Bellhorn was signed by the Boston Red Sox as a utility infielder; however, he became the regular second baseman after Pokey Reese and Nomar Garciaparra suffered early-season injuries. He proceeded to have the best batting average of his career, hitting .264 with 17 home runs and 82 RBI. Despite leading the league in strikeouts (177), Bellhorn was among the league leaders in walks (88, 3rd), pitches seen per at bat, batting average with runners in scoring position, and on-base percentage (.373, first among AL second baseman). Nearly half of his 2004 plate appearances resulted in a strikeout, walk or home run.

==== 2004 postseason ====
For the first seven postseason games of his career as a member of the Boston Red Sox, Bellhorn had two hits in 25 at-bats (.080); however, his resurgence started when he broke up Mike Mussina's perfect game in the 7th inning of Game 1 of the American League Championship Series versus the New York Yankees. Bellhorn then hit a three-run homer off Jon Lieber to give the Red Sox a 4–2 victory over the Yankees in Game 6. He also homered in Game 7 of the ALCS, which the Red Sox went on to win, sending the ball high and clanging it off the right-field foul pole.

Boston won Game 1 in the World Series, thanks to Bellhorn's eighth-inning two-run home run off Julián Tavárez (again, hitting a ball off the foul pole, this time Pesky's Pole at Fenway Park) to beat the St. Louis Cardinals 11–9. In doing so, Bellhorn became the first second baseman ever to homer in three consecutive postseason games. In Game 2, he hit a two-run double to help the Sox pull away to a 4–1 lead in an eventual 6–2 victory. The Red Sox went on to win the World Series in a four-game sweep of the Cardinals.

In fourteen post-season games, Bellhorn hit three doubles and three home runs with eight runs scored and eight RBI. He hit for a .191 batting average (9-for-44). His on-base percentage was .397, slugging average .447, and OPS .844.

Bellhorn appeared on the cover of Sports Illustrated on November 1, 2004.

=== After the Red Sox – Yankees, Padres, Reds ===
In 2005, Bellhorn struggled, registering a lower batting average and dramatically increasing his strikeouts. The Red Sox eventually released him. Bellhorn signed with the New York Yankees days later.

He spent the rest of the 2005 season with the Yankees, appearing in nine games. For his short tenure with the team, he was named to the Yankees All-Forgotten team in 2014.

In 2006, he joined the San Diego Padres, playing in 115 games but hitting .190 for his batting average for the season.

In 2007, Bellhorn signed a minor-league deal with the Cincinnati Reds with an invitation as a non-roster player to the Reds' spring training camp. He was then optioned to their Triple-A affiliate, the Louisville Bats, and a few days later he accepted the minor-league assignment.

On August 12, 2007, the Reds designated Bellhorn for assignment to make room for Josh Hamilton, who was coming off the 15-day disabled list. On October 12, 2007, Bellhorn refused his outright assignment to the minors, becoming a free agent. In 2008, he signed with the Los Angeles Dodgers and was assigned to their Double-A affiliate, the Jacksonville Suns. After a couple of months with the Suns, he was released by the Dodgers on July 24, 2008.

In February 2009, Bellhorn signed a minor-league contract with his former team, the Colorado Rockies. He played that year for the Colorado Springs Sky Sox. Bellhorn was granted free agency that November, and subsequently retired.

== Personal life ==
Bellhorn was born in Boston and was raised in the Orlando, Florida, suburb of Oviedo, where he attended St. Luke's Lutheran School in Oviedo, FL and graduated from Oviedo High School. Bellhorn went on to attend Auburn from 1993 to 1996.

Mark Bellhorn has one brother, Todd, who played in the New York Mets minor league system in 1998 and 1999. Bellhorn married Lindsey Bopp, in May 2013. Their first child was born in June 2014. Their second child was born 2 years later.
