= 2000 in baseball =

The following are the baseball events of the year 2000 throughout the world.

== Champions ==
=== Major League Baseball ===
- Regular Season Champions

League	Eastern Division Champion	Central Division Champion	Western Division Champion	Wild Card Qualifier
American League	New York Yankees	Chicago White Sox	Oakland Athletics	Seattle Mariners
National League	Atlanta Braves	St. Louis Cardinals	San Francisco Giants	New York Mets

- World Series Champion – New York Yankees
- Postseason – October 3 to October 26

Division Series; TV: ESPN/NBC/FOX
1	Chicago White Sox	0
4	Seattle Mariners	3
American League
2	Oakland Athletics	2
3	New York Yankees	3
1	San Francisco Giants	1
4	New York Mets	3
National League
2	St. Louis Cardinals	3
3	Atlanta Braves	0

League Championship Series; TV: NBC/FOX
4	Seattle Mariners	2
3	New York Yankees	4
4	New York Mets	4
2	St. Louis Cardinals	1

World Series; TV: FOX
AL3	New York Yankees	4
NL4	New York Mets	1

Click on any series score to link to that series' page.
Higher seed has home field advantage during Division Series and League Championship Series.
The American League Champion has home field advantage in the World Series as a result of the pre-2003 "alternating years" rule.

- Postseason MVPs
  - World Series MVP – Derek Jeter
  - ALCS MVP – David Justice
  - NLCS MVP – Mike Hampton
- All-Star Game, July 11 at Turner Field – American League, 6–3; Derek Jeter, MVP
  - Home Run Derby, July 10 – Sammy Sosa, Chicago Cubs

=== Other champions ===
- Caribbean World Series: Cangrejeros de Santurce (Puerto Rico)
- College World Series: LSU
- Cuban National Series: Santiago de Cuba over Pinar del Río
- Japan Series: Yomiuri Giants over Fukuoka Daiei Hawks (4–2)
- Korean Series: Hyundai Unicorns over Doosan Bears (4–2)
- Big League World Series: Fraser Valley, Canada
- Junior League World Series: Aiea, Hawaii
- Little League World Series: Sierra Maestra, Maracaibo, Venezuela
- Senior League World Series: Panama City, Panama
- Summer Olympic Games at Sydney, Australia: United States (Gold), Cuba (Silver), South Korea (Bronze)
- CPBL Championship: Uni-President Lions

== Awards and honors ==
- Baseball Hall of Fame
  - Sparky Anderson
  - Carlton Fisk
  - Bid McPhee
  - Tony Pérez
  - Turkey Stearnes
- Most Valuable Player
  - Jason Giambi, Oakland Athletics, 1B (AL)
  - Jeff Kent, San Francisco Giants, 2B (NL)
- Cy Young Award
  - Pedro Martínez, Boston Red Sox (AL)
  - Randy Johnson, Arizona Diamondbacks (NL)
- Rookie of the Year
  - Kazuhiro Sasaki, Seattle Mariners, P (AL)
  - Rafael Furcal, Atlanta Braves, SS (NL)
- Manager of the Year Award
  - Jerry Manuel, Chicago White Sox (AL)
  - Dusty Baker, San Francisco Giants (NL)
- Woman Executive of the Year (major or minor league): Mary Barney, Louisville RiverBats, International League
- Gold Glove Award
  - John Olerud (1B) (AL)
  - Roberto Alomar (2B) (AL)
  - Travis Fryman (3B) (AL)
  - Omar Vizquel (SS) (AL)
  - Jermaine Dye (OF) (AL)
  - Darin Erstad (OF) (AL)
  - Bernie Williams (OF) (AL)
  - Iván Rodríguez (C) (AL)
  - Kenny Rogers (P) (AL)
  - J. T. Snow (1B) (NL)
  - Pokey Reese (2B) (NL)
  - Scott Rolen (3B) (NL)
  - Neifi Pérez (SS) (NL)
  - Jim Edmonds (OF) (NL)
  - Steve Finley (OF) (NL)
  - Andruw Jones (OF) (NL)
  - Mike Matheny (C) (NL)
  - Greg Maddux (P) (NL)

== MLB statistical leaders ==
	American League		National League
Type	Name	Stat	Name	Stat
AVG	Nomar Garciaparra BOS	.372	Todd Helton COL	.372
HR	Troy Glaus ANA	47	Sammy Sosa CHC	50
RBI	Edgar Martínez SEA	145	Todd Helton COL	147
Wins	Tim Hudson OAK; David Wells TOR	20	Tom Glavine ATL	21
ERA	Pedro Martínez BOS	1.74	Kevin Brown LAD	2.58

== Major League Baseball final standings ==
American League
Rank	Club	Wins	Losses	Win %	GB
East Division
1st	New York Yankees	87	74	.540	--
2nd	Boston Red Sox	85	77	.525	2.5
3rd	Toronto Blue Jays	83	79	.512	4.5
4th	Baltimore Orioles	74	88	.457	13.5
5th	Tampa Bay Devil Rays	69	92	.429	18.0
Central Division
1st	Chicago White Sox	95	67	.586	--
2nd	Cleveland Indians	90	72	.556	5.0
3rd	Detroit Tigers	79	83	.488	16.0
4th	Kansas City Royals	77	85	.475	18.0
5th	Minnesota Twins	69	93	.426	26.0
West Division
1st	Oakland Athletics	91	70	.565	--
2nd	Seattle Mariners *	91	71	.562	0.5
3rd	Anaheim Angels	82	80	.506	9.5
4th	Texas Rangers	71	91	.438	20.5

National League
Rank	Club	Wins	Losses	Win %	GB
East Division
1st	Atlanta Braves	95	67	.586	--
2nd	New York Mets *	94	68	.580	1.0
3rd	Florida Marlins	79	82	.491	15.5
4th	Montreal Expos	67	95	.414	28.0
5th	Philadelphia Phillies	65	97	.401	30.0
Central Division
1st	St. Louis Cardinals	95	67	.586	--
2nd	Cincinnati Reds	85	77	.525	10.0
3rd	Milwaukee Brewers	73	89	.451	22.0
4th	Houston Astros	72	90	.444	23.0
5th	Pittsburgh Pirates	69	93	.426	26.0
6th	Chicago Cubs	65	97	.401	30.0
West Division
1st	San Francisco Giants	97	65	.599	--
2nd	Los Angeles Dodgers	86	76	.531	11.0
3rd	Arizona Diamondbacks	85	77	.525	12.0
4th	Colorado Rockies	82	80	.506	15.0
5th	San Diego Padres	76	86	.469	21.0

* The asterisk denotes the club that won the wild card for its respective league.
NOTE: Oakland did not have to make up one postponed game, because even if they had lost and had finished in a tie with Seattle, they would have been awarded the division title due to winning the season series (9-4) between the teams.

== Events ==
=== January ===
- January 3 - Bobby Bonilla is released by the New York Mets. The Mets, still owing Bonilla money on his contract, agree to a deferment system that would pay Bonilla $1.19 million dollars every year on July 1st from 2011 until the year 2035.
- January 6 – Major league officials say that Atlanta Braves reliever John Rocker is to undergo psychological testing following derogatory racist remarks he makes in an interview with Sports Illustrated magazine. Commissioner Bud Selig says he'll listen to what the doctors say before deciding what punishment—if any—is handed down to the pitcher.
  - Dwight Gooden is signed as a free agent by the Houston Astros.
- January 11 – The baseball writers elect catcher Carlton Fisk and first baseman Tony Pérez to the Hall of Fame. Fisk is chosen in his 2nd year on the ballot, while Pérez is picked on his 9th try.
- January 31 – Atlanta Braves reliever John Rocker is suspended from baseball until May 1 by Commissioner Bud Selig for his racial and ethnic remarks in an article published in Sports Illustrated last month. He is also fined an undisclosed amount and ordered to undergo sensitivity training.

=== February ===
- February 10 – The Seattle Mariners accommodate center fielder Ken Griffey Jr., trading him to his hometown Cincinnati Reds in exchange for Mike Cameron, Brett Tomko, Antonio Pérez and minor leaguer Jake Meyer.
- February 29 – Manager Sparky Anderson, 19th-century star Bid McPhee, and Negro leagues player Norman "Turkey" Stearnes are elected to the Hall of Fame by the Veterans Committee.

=== March ===
- March 1 – Independent arbitrator Shyam Das cuts Atlanta Braves pitcher John Rocker's suspension from 28 days to 14 days. Rocker, who is allowed to report to spring training with the team, also has his fine cut.
- March 29 – The Chicago Cubs open the major league season in the Tokyo Dome in Tokyo, Japan, by defeating the New York Mets, 5–3, in the first big league game ever played outside of North America. Jon Lieber gets the victory and Mike Hampton takes the loss. Mark Grace and Mike Piazza also homer.

=== April ===
- April 3
  - Andrés Galarraga hits a home run in his first game back after missing the entire 1999 season following cancer surgery, as the Atlanta Braves defeat his former team, the Colorado Rockies, 2–0, at Turner Field.
  - A new major league record for Opening Day is set with five players having multiple home run games. Gabe Kapler becomes the first player to hit home runs in his first two at-bats in a Texas Rangers uniform, while his teammate Iván Rodríguez also adds a pair of homers in a 10–4 Texas victory against the Chicago White Sox. Vladimir Guerrero also hits a pair of homers for the Montreal Expos, but the Los Angeles Dodgers defeat Montreal, 10–4, behind Eric Karros' grand slam. Jason Giambi of the Oakland Athletics hits two home runs against the Detroit Tigers. Despite Giambi's effort, Detroit edges the Athletics, 7–4.
- April 4 – Montreal Expos closer Ugueth Urbina ties a major league record by striking out the side on nine pitches. His victims are F. P. Santangelo, Devon White and Mark Grudzielanek in the ninth inning, as Montreal defeats the Los Angeles Dodgers, 10–4, at Montreal's Olympic Stadium.
- April 7 :
  - A total of 57 home runs are hit in the 15 games played, for a new major league record. The previous mark of 55 was set in 17 games on August 13, 1999. There are 36 homers hit in the AL, smashing the previous mark for a single league.
  - The Philadelphia Phillies defeat the Houston Astros, 4–1, in the first game played at Enron Field in Houston.
- April 9 – The Minnesota Twins defeat the Kansas City Royals 13–7. In the process, they become the first teams in major league history to each hit back-to-back-to-back home runs in the same game. Ron Coomer, Jacque Jones and Matt LeCroy hit consecutive homers for Minnesota in the 6th inning, followed by three in a row by Carlos Beltrán, Jermaine Dye and Mike Sweeney of Kansas City two innings later.
- April 10 – The Colorado Rockies punch out the Cincinnati Reds, 7–5, despite Ken Griffey Jr.'s 400th career home run. Aged 30, Griffey is the youngest player in major league history to reach that milestone.
- April 11 :
  - The Los Angeles Dodgers edge the San Francisco Giants, 6–5, in the first game played at Pacific Bell Park in San Francisco. Shortstop Kevin Elster leads the Dodgers attack with three home runs.
  - The Detroit Tigers sink the Seattle Mariners, 5–2, in the first game played at Comerica Park in Detroit.
- April 13 – The Tampa Bay Devil Rays purchase the contract of Dwight Gooden from the Houston Astros.
- April 15 – The Baltimore Orioles defeat the Minnesota Twins, 6–4, as Cal Ripken Jr. gets the 3,000th hit of his illustrious career. Ripken goes 3-for-5 in becoming the 24th player to reach the milestone, and the seventh to get 3,000 hits and 400 home runs.
- April 16 – Cleveland Indians starter Chuck Finley, who is already the only pitcher to strike out four batters in one inning twice, does it for the third time as the left-hander strikes out Tom Evans, Royce Clayton, Chad Curtis (who takes first base on a passed ball) and Rafael Palmeiro in the third inning. Finley beats the Texas Rangers 2–1 with the help of back-to-back ninth-inning home runs from Manny Ramírez and Jim Thome.
- April 21 – The Anaheim Angels melt the Tampa Bay Devil Rays 9–6. Mo Vaughn and Tim Salmon hit back-to-back home runs for Anaheim in the fourth inning, then repeat the feat in the ninth. Troy Glaus also homers in those same two innings, marking the first time in major league history that three players homer in the same inning twice in the same game. The three players with two home runs in the game ties another major league record.
- April 23 – In the New York Yankees' 10–7 victory over the Toronto Blue Jays, Yankees' Bernie Williams and Jorge Posada each hit home runs from both sides of the plate, marking the first time in major league history that a pair of teammates accomplish the feat in the same game.
- April 26 – Vladimir Guerrero hits his 100th career home run helping the Montreal Expos beat the Colorado Rockies 9–2.
- April 29 – The San Francisco Giants finally win, beating the Montreal Expos 2–1 for their first victory at Pacific Bell Park. The Giants are the first team to lose six straight games to begin play in a newly constructed home park.
- April 30 :
  - Randy Johnson of the Arizona Diamondbacks compiles what might have been the best first month for a pitcher in major league history, going 6–0 with an 0.91 ERA, three complete games and a pair of shutouts.
  - The St. Louis Cardinals defeat the Philadelphia Phillies, 4–3, as Mark McGwire and Jim Edmonds hit home runs. St. Louis finishes the month with 55 homers, a new record for the month of April. It also ties the National League mark for homers in any month. Major league batters also set a record for most home runs in a month by hitting 931 in April – the total is 140 more than the number hit in 1999.

=== May ===
- May 10 – Rickey Henderson becomes the 21st major leaguer to garner 10,000 at-bats in his career. Henderson finishes the night with 10,002 at bats and trails only Cal Ripken Jr. among active players.
- May 11 – The Milwaukee Brewers crash into the Chicago Cubs, 14–8, in the longest nine-inning game played in National League history. Not only is the game memorable for Milwaukee's four-hour, 22-minute drubbing of Chicago, but also because it features one of the longest home runs in the history of Wrigley Field. A captioned picture circulated by the Associated Press put it this way: "Rick Frohock celebrates on the rooftop of a three-story building on Waveland Ave. behind the left-field bleachers of Wrigley Field after catching a home run hit by Chicago's Glenallen Hill against the Brewers. It is believed to be the first time a ball lands on top of the apartment building." Hill's shot is estimated at 490 feet by the next day's press accounts and eventually measured at 500 feet.
- May 12 – Boston Red Sox pitcher Pedro Martínez, who posts 17 strikeouts in his last start on May 6 against the Tampa Bay Devil Rays, strikes out 15 batters in a 9–0 shutout over the Baltimore Orioles, to tie an American League pitching record for the most strikeouts over two games. The mark is set in 1968 by Luis Tiant, while pitching for the Cleveland Indians.
- May 18 – Mark McGwire hits three home runs and drives in seven runs in a St. Louis Cardinals 7–2 victory over the Philadelphia Phillies. The three homers move McGwire past Mickey Mantle into eighth place on the all-time list with 539.
- May 19 – The Pittsburgh Pirates defeat the St. Louis Cardinals, 13–1, as catcher Jason Kendall hits for the cycle to become the only Pirate ever to do so at Three Rivers Stadium.
- May 20 – Rickey Henderson of the Seattle Mariners hits a leadoff home run in the Mariners' 4–3 loss to the Tampa Bay Devil Rays at Safeco Field. Henderson joins Ted Williams and Willie McCovey as the only players who have hit at least one home run in four different decades. Henderson signs with the Mariners the day before, after being released by the New York Mets on May 13.
- May 23 – The Baltimore Orioles top the Seattle Mariners, 4–2. Seattle's Rickey Henderson draws his 2,000th career walk in the ninth inning, making him the third player to reach that level in the majors, just behind Babe Ruth and Ted Williams.
- May 29 – Second baseman Randy Velarde of the Oakland Athletics turns an unassisted triple play, just the 11th in major league history, on a line drive smashed by the New York Yankees' Shane Spencer. With runners on first and second running with the pitch, Velarde tags Jorge Posada as he nears second base, then touches the bag to retire Tino Martinez. New York wins the game, 4–1. In 1995, while playing with the Yankees, Velarde turned an unassisted triple play against the Los Angeles Dodgers in spring training after the 1994–95 strike ended.

=== June ===
- June 1 – Japanese right-hander Tomokazu Ohka, a top prospect with the Pawtucket Red Sox, becomes the first pitcher in nearly 50 years to throw a nine-inning perfect game in the International League. Ohka retired in succession all 27 batters he faces in a 2–0 triumph over the Charlotte Knights. Aftermath, the 24-year-old rookie needs just 76 pitches to toss the first nine-inning perfect game in the league since Dick Marlowe did it for the Buffalo Bisons in its 1952 season.
- June 2 :
  - With the Detroit Tigers visiting Wrigley Field for the first time since the 1945 World Series, Chicago Cubs reliever Rick Aguilera pitches a perfect ninth inning for his 300th career save in a 2–0 Chicago victory.
  - Tampa Bay Devil Rays first baseman Fred McGriff becomes the 31st player to reach 400 career home runs, when he goes deep against Glendon Rusch with a two-run drive in a 5–3 loss to the New York Mets at Shea Stadium.
  - The Montreal Expos announce they will wear Maurice Richard's uniform number 9 on their jerseys for the rest of the season to honor the Montreal Canadiens great who died the previous week. It is believed to be the first time a major league team honored an athlete from another sport in this way.
- June 11 – After being released by the Tampa Bay Devil Rays, Dwight Gooden agrees to terms with the New York Yankees.
- June 21 – At the Oakland Coliseum, the Oakland Athletics defeats the Baltimore Orioles, 10–3, as Eric Chavez becomes the first Athletics player to hit for the cycle at home since the team moved to Oakland in 1968.
- June 26 – After hitting 35 home runs in 53 Minor league games, Alex Cabrera makes his big league debut with the Arizona Diamondbacks and hits a two-run, pinch-hit home run in the eighth inning. Arizona defeats the Houston Astros, 6–1, while Cabrera becomes the 78th player in Major League Baseball history to homer in his first career at-bat.
- June 27 – One day after lasting just 1.2 innings and giving up eight runs in a start against the San Diego Padres, Orel Hershiser is released by the Los Angeles Dodgers. He never again appears in a major league game.
- June 30 – Trailing 8–1 to the Atlanta Braves, the New York Mets score 10 runs in the bottom of the 8th inning, capped off by Mike Piazza's three-run home run off reliever Terry Mulholland. There are four walks in the inning, and 9 of the 10 runs score with two outs in the inning. The Mets win the game 11–8.

=== July ===
- July 1 – On Canada's 133rd birthday, the Marlins' Ryan Dempster and the Expos' Mike Johnson hook up in a rare matchup of Canadian starters. Dempster comes out on top as Florida defeats Montreal 6–5. Johnson hails from Edmonton, Alberta, while Dempster is a native of Sechelt, British Columbia. This is the first matchup of Canadian-born starters since September 1999, when Dempster took on Éric Gagné of the Dodgers.
- July 5 – Arizona outfielder Luis Gonzalez becomes the first Diamondback to hit for the cycle, helping his team to trip the Astros 12–9. It is the first time the feat is accomplished in new Enron Field, and Gonzalez is just the 9th player to both hit for the cycle and have a 30-or-more-game hitting streak.
- July 6 :
  - St. Louis rookie catcher Keith McDonald hits a home run in his second at bat, becoming only the second player in major league history to hit home runs in each of his first two big league at bats. Bob Nieman, in 1951, is the other.
  - Dodgers pitcher Orel Hershiser announces his retirement.
  - The American Sportscasters Association names Dodgers legend Vin Scully as the No. 1 sportscaster of the 20th century. Howard Cosell finishes second, followed by Mel Allen and Red Barber.
- July 8 – In a New York match, the Yankees whip the Mets by identical 4–2 scores in both ends of an unusual day-night doubleheader. With the first game played at Shea Stadium and the nightcap at Yankee Stadium, it is the first time since 1903 that two teams play two games in different stadiums on the same day. Dwight Gooden wins the first game with a six-inning effort in his first start since returning to the Yankees. Roger Clemens wins the nightcap and precipitates a near-brawl when he drills Mike Piazza in the helmet with an inside fastball. Piazza suffers a concussion.
- July 11 – The American League wins its fourth consecutive All-Star Game, beating the National League 6–3. Derek Jeter of the Yankees and Chipper Jones of the Braves each go 3-for-3 in the contest. Jeter takes MVP honors, while James Baldwin of the White Sox is the winning pitcher.
- July 15 – A 1909 Honus Wagner baseball card is auctioned for a record $1.1 million on eBay. Other high-priced items in the auction include a baseball autographed by the entire 1919 "Chicago Black Sox" team, including Shoeless Joe Jackson as well as the umpires who worked the final game of the 1919 World Series, which sells for $93,666, including a 15% buyer's premium. A ball signed by the 1919 Reds goes for $11,208, while a baseball autographed by Babe Ruth sells for $76,020. A contract from Shoeless Joe Jackson's sale of his Chicago pool hall to teammate Lefty Williams sells for $36,098. The contract, dated October 6, 1921, is for just $1.
- July 20 – In a Houston 6–2 win over Cincinnati, Reds pinch-hitter Mike Bell strikes out in his major league debut, making history by becoming part of the first third-generation family to play for the same major league team. His grandfather Gus Bell and father Buddy Bell also played for the Reds.

=== August ===
- August 4 – The Blue Jays obtain outfielder Dave Martinez from the Rangers. Martinez becomes the 9th major leaguer to play for four teams in a season. He begins the year with Tampa Bay and also plays with the Cubs, in addition to Texas and Toronto. The last one who did so was Dave Kingman (1977). Before him, according to historian Scott Flatow, the four-in-one players were Frank Huelsman (1904), Willis Hudlin (1940), Paul Lehner (1951), Ted Gray (1955), Wes Covington (1961) and Mike Kilkenny (1972).
- August 19 – In the Houston Astros' 10–8 victory over the Milwaukee Brewers, Jeff Bagwell has two home runs and five RBI. Bagwell becomes the first Houston player to reach 300 homers in his career.
- August 21 – Potomac's Esix Snead breaks Lenny Dykstra's Carolina League record of 105 stolen bases by swiping his 106th of the season. Snead has a batting average of .242 and a .338 on-base percentage. It was the 10th time in the last 20 years that a minor-leaguer had stolen 100 or more bases in a season. According to Howe Sports data, the eight players who stole 100 or more bases in the minors were:
  - Vince Coleman : 145 (Macon, South Atlantic, 1983)
  - Donell Nixon : 144 (Bakersfield, California, 1983)
  - Jeff Stone : 123 (Spartanburg, South Atlantic, 1983)
  - Alan Wiggins : 120 (Lodi, California, 1980)
  - Marcus Lawton : 111 (Columbia, South Atlantic, 1985)
  - Esix Snead : 106 (Potomac, Carolina, 2000)
  - Lenny Dykstra : 105 (Lynchburg, Carolina, 1983)
  - Donell Nixon : 102 (Chattanooga, Southern, 1984)
  - Vince Coleman : 101 (Louisville, American Association, 1983)
  - Albert Hall : 100 (Durham, Carolina, 1980)
- August 22 :
  - The Dodgers defeat the Expos 14–6, as Eric Karros becomes the first Dodger player to hit two home runs in the same single inning.
  - In the 12th inning of 6–6 tie game against the Atlanta Braves at Coors Field, Colorado Rockies manager Buddy Bell, out of pitchers, sends catcher Brent Mayne in to pitch. Mayne pitches a scoreless inning; the Rockies win the game in the bottom of the 12th as Adam Melhuse, pinch-hitting for Mayne, who is unable to swing a bat due to a sprained left wrist, singles off John Rocker to drive in Neifi Pérez with the winning run. Mayne is credited with the win, becoming the first non-pitcher to win a game in 32 years since Rocky Colavito did it on August 25, 1968.
- August 27 – The Anaheim Angels edge the Cleveland Indians 10–9, as outfielder Tim Salmon hits his 30th home run of the year in the 5th inning. The Angels become the first team in AL history to have four players (Troy Glaus, Mo Vaughn, Garret Anderson, Salmon) reach the 30-homer mark in a single season. The Toronto Blue Jays are close with two hitters over 30 and two at 28. It was done seven times in the NL.

=== September ===
- September 1 – For the second time in the season, pitcher Ryan Rupe of the Tampa Bay Devil Rays gives up a grand slam to Kansas City Royals outfielder Jermaine Dye. The other slam was on April 26.
- September 3 – Kenny Lofton of the Cleveland Indians ties a major league record by scoring in his 18th straight game in the first inning of the Cleveland Indians' 12–11, 13-inning victory over the Baltimore Orioles. Red Rolfe set the record in 1939 for the New York Yankees.
- September 4 – At Fenway Park, Carl Everett of the Boston Red Sox becomes only the sixth major-league switch-hitter to drive in 100 runs in both leagues when he knocks in his 100th RBI of the year. Boston wins over the Seattle Mariners, 5–1. Everett drove in 108 runs for the Houston Astros in 1999. The other five 100-100 switch-hitters are Ted Simmons, Ken Singleton, Eddie Murray, Bobby Bonilla and J. T. Snow. Before the game, the Red Sox honor Hall of Fame catcher Carlton Fisk. Fisk, who plays his first nine seasons with Boston, joins Bobby Doerr (1), Joe Cronin (4), Carl Yastrzemski (8) and Ted Williams (9) in having his number (27) be retired at Fenway.
- September 6 :
  - Scott Sheldon of the Texas Rangers becomes just the third player in major league history to play all nine positions in one game when he does it in a 13–1 loss to the Chicago White Sox. Sheldon joins Bert Campaneris (September 8, 1965) and César Tovar (September 22, 1968) as true utility players.
  - After reaching an agreement with Morgan, Lewis & Bockius LLP, Major League Baseball obtains the right to use http://www.mlb.com. The law firm had registered the mlb.com domain name in 1994 and refused to release it, making it necessary for the sport to use http://www.majorleaguebaseball.com until reaching this agreement.
- September 10 – Randy Johnson of the Arizona Diamondbacks becomes the 12th pitcher to reach the 3,000-strikeout plateau, fanning a season-high 14 in seven innings as the Diamondbacks lose to the Florida Marlins 4–3 in 12 innings. Johnson's 3,000 strikeout victim is Mike Lowell, who fans to end the 4th inning. In the first inning, Johnson also records his 300th strikeout for the third consecutive season and the fourth time overall. Nolan Ryan is the only other pitcher to accomplish the feat, and is the only pitcher who reached 300 strikeouts more times with six (1972–74, 1976–77 and 1989).
- September 12 – The Diamondbacks edge the Dodgers 5–4, despite Dave Hansen's major league record-breaking seventh pinch-hit home run of the season. Hansen's blast, off Curt Schilling, breaks the mark set in 1932 by Brooklyn's Johnny Frederick.
- September 15 – Rickey Henderson scores his first two at bats to pace the Seattle Mariners to a 10–2 win over the Baltimore Orioles. Henderson moves into second place on the all-time list of runs (2,175), one ahead of Babe Ruth and Hank Aaron, and behind only Ty Cobb.
- September 16 – The St. Louis Cardinals defeat the Chicago Cubs 7–6, despite Sammy Sosa's 50th home run of the season. Sosa becomes the second player to hit 50 or more in three consecutive years, joining Mark McGwire.
- September 19 – In the Cincinnati Reds' 7–3 loss to the San Francisco Giants, Ken Griffey Jr. pinch-hits his 400th home run. He is the first major leaguer to reach the mark as a pinch-hitter.
- September 22 – José Lima of the Houston Astros sets an NL single-season record by allowing his 47th home run in the Astros' 12–5 loss to the Cincinnati Reds. The major league record for home runs allowed in a season is 50, set by the Minnesota Twins' Bert Blyleven in 1986.
- September 23 – Rafael Palmeiro hits his 400th career home run.
- September 25 – For the first time since 1951 and only the second time since 1899, a team plays a doubleheader against two different teams as the Cleveland Indians beat the Chicago White Sox in a makeup game 9–2 in the first game and then lose to the Minnesota Twins 4–3 in the second game.
- September 26 – Longtime broadcast partner NBC declines to renew its rights. NBC had televised baseball since 1947, with the exception of 1990–93, and was the exclusive home of the World Series for 27 years.
- September 27 – In an Oakland 9–7 victory over the Angels, Anaheim's Darin Erstad hits a home run in the 2nd inning for his 99th RBI of the year from the leadoff spot to set a new record. Nomar Garciaparra drove home 98 in 1997 for the previous mark.
- September 28 – At Camden Yards, the Orioles bat around in back-to-back innings and set a single-game franchise scoring record in a 23–1 rout of the Toronto Blue Jays.
- September 28 – In the final game ever played at Milwaukee's County Stadium the Brewers drop an 8–1 decision to the Cincinnati Reds.

=== October ===
- October 1 :
  - The Chicago Cubs defeat the Pittsburgh Pirates, 10–9, in the last game played at Three Rivers Stadium. Coincidentally, the Pirates defeated the Cubs in 1970 in the last game played at their previous stadium, Forbes Field.
  - Shane Halter of the Detroit Tigers becomes the fourth player to play all nine positions in a single game as the Tigers won the game 12–11 on the final day of the regular season.
- October 8 – Bobby Jones of the New York Mets one-hits the San Francisco Giants in Game 4 of the NL Division Series to advance the Mets to the NLCS.
- October 14 – In Game 4 of the AL Championship Series, New York Yankees ace Roger Clemens strikes out 15 and allows one hit – a seventh-inning double by Al Martin in a 5–0 victory over the Seattle Mariners.
- October 17 – Orlando Hernández pitches the New York Yankees to a 9–7 victory in the decisive sixth game of the ALCS, in what would be the last Major League Baseball game televised by NBC.
- October 26 – The New York Yankees defeat the New York Mets 4–2, to win their 26th World Series in five games. Luis Sojo hits a single in the top of the 9th inning and drives home the winning run for the Yankees. Teammates Bernie Williams and Derek Jeter hit home runs, and Jeter is named the Series MVP.

=== November ===
- November 6 – Kazuhiro Sasaki of the Seattle Mariners, at the age of 32, becomes the second oldest major league player to be named rookie of the year. Only Sam Jethroe of the Boston Braves was older, Jethroe was 33 when he won the award in 1950.
- November 16 – Jeff Kent of the San Francisco Giants was named the National League MVP.
- November 17 – Jason Giambi of the Oakland Athletics was named the American League MVP beating out a big lineup of stars like Frank Thomas, Alex Rodriguez and Pedro Martínez.
- November 18 – The Seattle Mariners sign Japanese star outfielder Ichiro Suzuki to a three-year contract.

=== December ===
- December 1 – Relief pitcher Turk Wendell, who wears uniform number 99, agrees to a three-year deal worth $9,999,999.99 with the New York Mets. Wendell asks that his contract include an option year in which he plays for free, but that plan is unworkable because the MLB collective bargaining agreement set a $200,000 minimum salary.
- December 11 – The Texas Rangers sign free agent shortstop Alex Rodriguez to a record $252 million, 10-year contract. It is, at the time, the richest contract in the history of professional sports.

== Movies ==
- Fastpitch
- Finding Buck McHenry (TV)
- Major League Baseball All-Century Team (Video)

== Births ==
=== January ===
- January 2 – Spencer Arrighetti
- January 4 – Valente Bellozo
- January 5 – B.J. Murray
- January 12 – Ben Malgeri
- January 15 – Triston Casas
- January 18 – Lyon Richardson
- January 19 – Travis Adams
- January 20 – Nate Lavender
- January 25 – Lenyn Sosa
- January 25 – Eduardo Valencia
- January 26 – Kelvin Cáceres
- January 28 – Mark Manfredi
- January 30 – Bryan Woo

=== February ===
- February 2 – Andrew Hoffmann
- February 2 – Munetaka Murakami
- February 5 – Daniel Palencia
- February 7 – Juan Then
- February 9 – Logan O'Hoppe
- February 14 – Brad Lord
- February 14 – Gabriel Moreno
- February 15 – Elvis Luciano
- February 18 – Seth Halvorsen
- February 18 – Nick Nastrini
- February 19 – Justyn-Henry Malloy
- February 21 – Ty Madden
- February 21 – Bo Naylor
- February 22 – Caleb Durbin
- February 23 – Mason Adams
- February 27 – Gabriel Arias
- February 29 – Tristan Peters

=== March ===
- March 3 – José A. Ferrer
- March 3 – Maikel García
- March 8 – Ryan Bergert
- March 8 – David Festa
- March 11 – Tirso Ornelas
- March 14 – Jack O'Loughlin
- March 17 – Gordon Graceffo
- March 19 – Mike Vasil
- March 20 – Colton Cowser
- March 21 – Kenedy Corona
- March 26 – Jeremiah Jackson
- March 27 – Nick Schnell

=== April ===
- April 3 – Israel Pineda
- April 4 – Raynel Delgado
- April 4 – Shane Smith
- April 12 – Cade Povich
- April 14 – Roddery Muñoz
- April 15 – Rhylan Thomas
- April 17 – Will Dion
- April 17 – Ronny Simon
- April 18 – Prelander Berroa
- April 19 – Sal Frelick
- April 21 – Jack Leiter
- April 21 – Wade Meckler
- April 24 – Trey Sweeney
- April 28 – Alek Thomas
- April 30 – Cade Winquest

=== May ===
- May 1 – Denzel Clarke
- May 2 – Eric Cerantola
- May 7 – Alexander Canario
- May 10 – Nolan Gorman
- May 11 – Zach Dezenzo
- May 12 – Andre Granillo
- May 16 – Luis García Jr.
- May 17 – T. J. Rumfield
- May 18 – Chase Silseth
- May 22 – Zebby Matthews
- May 23 – Paul Gervase
- May 23 – Ethan Hankins
- May 25 – Brock Rodden
- May 26 – Jonathan Ornelas
- May 26 – Endy Rodríguez
- May 27 – Brandyn Garcia
- May 28 – Dylan Smith
- May 31 – Grant Holman
- May 31 – Spencer Schwellenbach

=== June ===
- June 1 – Brian Fitzpatrick
- June 1 – Iván Herrera
- June 5 – Jack Neely
- June 6 – Riley Cornelio
- June 8 – Connor Norby
- June 14 – Trey Lipscomb
- June 14 – Bobby Witt Jr.
- June 15 – Oswald Peraza
- June 17 – Mason Montgomery
- June 20 – Ronny Henríquez
- June 20 – Abner Uribe
- June 22 – Tyler Callihan
- June 22 – Livan Soto
- June 26 – Franco Alemán
- June 26 – Chad Dallas
- June 28 – Jared Simpson

=== July ===
- July 4 – AJ Blubaugh
- July 4 – Juan Mejía
- July 6 – Keider Montero
- July 8 – Michael McGreevy
- July 10 – Lawrence Butler
- July 12 – Nathan Church
- July 14 – Justin Wrobleski
- July 17 – Kohl Drake
- July 18 – Kyle Manzardo
- July 19 – Jonathan Cannon
- July 26 – Tyler Black
- July 26 – Braydon Fisher
- July 26 – Spencer Miles
- July 27 – Mike Paredes
- July 29 – Joe Rock

=== August ===
- August 4 – Zach Cole
- August 5 – Luis Guerrero
- August 9 – Hayden Juenger
- August 13 – Jordan Díaz
- August 14 – Johan Rojas
- August 14 – Drew Sommers
- August 15 – Zach Agnos
- August 15 – Brooks Baldwin
- August 15 – McCade Brown
- August 18 – Nasim Nuñez
- August 19 – Yilber Díaz
- August 21 – Corbin Carroll
- August 25 – Adam Kloffenstein
- August 27 – Cameron Weston
- August 30 – Luke Little

=== September ===
- September 1 – Dylan Ross
- September 2 – Jase Bowen
- September 5 – Rece Hinds
- September 7 – Jacob Melton
- September 8 – Brennan Malone
- September 11 – Blake Adams
- September 13 – Osleivis Basabe
- September 15 – Quinn Priester
- September 17 – Ben Joyce
- September 17 – Brandon Sproat
- September 18 – Ceddanne Rafaela
- September 19 – Blake Burkhalter
- September 19 – Tyler Schweitzer
- September 24 – Graham Pauley
- September 27 – Drew Gilbert
- September 27 – Simeon Woods Richardson
- September 28 – Riley Greene

=== October ===
- October 1 – Drew Thorpe
- October 2 – Brandon Valenzuela
- October 3 – C. J. Abrams
- October 4 – Jace Jung
- October 4 – Quinn Mathews
- October 15 – Lenny Torres
- October 17 – Carson Palmquist
- October 20 – Carson Whisenhunt
- October 21 – Luis Curvelo
- October 26 – Curtis Mead
- October 26 – Parker Messick
- October 31 – Wilkin Ramos

=== November ===
- November 5 – Ben Williamson
- November 6 – Jim Jarvis
- November 7 – Mason Barnett
- November 7 – Rafael Flores
- November 10 – Eddys Leonard
- November 10 – Ryan Ritter
- November 13 – George Valera
- November 18 – Chandler Simpson
- November 24 – Tyler Locklear
- November 24 – Josh White
- November 25 – José Franco

=== December ===
- December 2 – Jake Bennett
- December 3 – Troy Melton
- December 7 – Grant McCray
- December 7 – Andrew Pinckney
- December 8 – Andy Pages
- December 8 – Andrew Walters
- December 12 – Luarbert Arias
- December 15 – Hunter Barco
- December 15 – Trevor Martin
- December 22 – Jack Kochanowicz
- December 25 – Bradley Blalock
- December 29 – Julio Rodríguez
- December 30 – Coleman Crow
- December 30 – Adam Macko
- December 31 – Liover Peguero

== Deaths ==
=== January ===
- January 1 – Andy Spognardi, 91, infielder for the 1931 Boston Red Sox.
- January 4 – John Milner, 50, first baseman and left fielder who appeared in 1,215 games for the New York Mets (1971–1977), Pittsburgh Pirates (1978–1981, 1982) and Montreal Expos (1981–1982) whose 131 career home runs included ten career grand slams; member 1973 National League (NL) champions and 1979 World Series champions.
- January 11 – Bob Lemon, 79, Hall of Fame and seven-time All-Star pitcher and former third baseman who spent his entire career with the Cleveland Indians, winning 207 games, including a no-hitter, while recording seven 20-win seasons and winning final game of the 1948 World Series; managed New York Yankees to the 1978 World Series title and 1981 American League (AL) pennant; in addition to skippering Yanks (1978–1979, 1981–1982), he managed the Kansas City Royals (1970–1972) and Chicago White Sox (1977–1978).
- January 15 – Marie Kazmierczak, 79, All-American Girls Professional Baseball League outfielder.
- January 16 – By Saam, 85, broadcaster for the Philadelphia Athletics and Phillies clubs from 1938 through 1975; honored with Ford C. Frick Award in 1990.
- January 19 – Manny Montejo, 64, Cuban pitcher for the 1961 Detroit Tigers.
- January 19 – Lynn Myers, 85, shortstop who played from 1938 to 1939 for the St. Louis Cardinals.
- January 20 – Ron Herbel, 62, relief pitcher for the San Francisco Giants, San Diego Padres, New York Mets and Atlanta Braves in a span of nine seasons from 1963 to 1971, whose career batting average of .029 (6-for-206) is the worst ever for a major leaguer with a minimum of 100 at bats.
- January 25 – Joe Linsalata, 83, American League umpire who worked in 166 games during the 1961 season; veteran minor-league arbiter.
- January 26 – Frankie Pack, 75, pinch-hitter for the 1949 St. Louis Browns.
- January 26 – Bill Strickland, 91, pitcher for the 1937 St. Louis Browns.
- January 27 – Dorothy Damaschke, 82, All-American Girls Professional Baseball League outfielder.
- January 28 – Ted Gullic, 93, outfielder who played in 196 total games for 1930 and 1933 St. Louis Browns; starred for minor-league Milwaukee Brewers teams of the 1930s.

=== February ===
- February 3 – John Leovich, 81, backup catcher for the 1941 Philadelphia Athletics.
- February 10 – Gene Lambert, 78, who pitched in three games for the 1941–1942 Philadelphia Phillies.
- February 10 – Blas Monaco, 84, second baseman who played with the Cleveland Indians in the 1937 and 1946 seasons.
- February 11 – Robert Gaston, 89, catcher for the Homestead Grays of the Negro leagues from 1933 to 1948.
- February 15 – Bob Ramazzotti, 83, backup infielder who played for the Brooklyn Dodgers and Chicago Cubs over part of seven seasons between 1946 and 1953.
- February 16 – Wayne Blackburn, 85, minor-league infielder and manager over 19 seasons between 1936 and 1956 who served the Detroit Tigers as an MLB coach from June 1963 through 1964, and then as a longtime scout.
- February 16 – Soup Campbell, 84, outfielder who played for the Cleveland Indians from 1940 to 1941.
- February 17 – Turkey Tyson, 85, minor league first baseman who had one at-bat as a pinch-hitter for the 1944 Philadelphia Phillies.
- February 18 – Lefty Hoerst, 82, pitcher for the Philadelphia Phillies who posted a 10–33 mark and 5.17 ERA in 98 games (1940–1942 and 1946–1947).
- February 25 – Culley Rikard, 85, fourth outfielder for the Pittsburgh Pirates in part of three seasons spanning 1941–1947.

=== March ===
- March 2 – Danny Musser, 94, third baseman for the 1932 Washington Senators.
- March 2 – Jack Robinson, 79, relief pitcher for the 1949 Boston Red Sox.
- March 7 – Jack Sanford, 70, All-Star pitcher named 1957 National League Rookie of the Year as a member of the Philadelphia Phillies, and posted a 24–7 record for the NL champion 1962 San Francisco Giants; led NL in shutouts (1960); also pitched for California Angels and Kansas City Athletics, and served as a pitching coach.
- March 13 – Harry Bright, 70, utility infielder for five different teams between 1958 and 1965; a longtime player and manager in the minor leagues who also served as a scout for several major league organizations.
- March 16 – Carlos Velázquez, 51, Puerto Rican pitcher for the 1973 Milwaukee Brewers of the American League.
- March 19 – Joanne Weaver, 64, All-Star outfielder for the Fort Wayne Daisies of the All-American Girls Professional Baseball League, who hit a league-leading .429 in 1954, which remains the highest professional baseball single-season average posted in modern era.
- March 19 – Dewey Williams, 84, catcher who played from 1944 through 1948 for the Chicago Cubs and the Cincinnati Reds.
- March 29 – Hank Miklos, 89, relief pitcher for the 1944 Chicago Cubs, and one of several players who only appeared in the major leagues during World War II.
- March 30 – Mary Flaherty, 74, All-American Girls Professional Baseball League player.

=== April ===
- April 6 – Don "Pep" Johnson, 88, twice All-Star second baseman who in 1945 hit .302 with 94 runs and 58 runs batted in as leadoff hitter for the pennant-winning Chicago Cubs; his father was an MLB infielder and longtime scout.
- April 13 – Frenchy Bordagaray, 90, outfielder/third baseman who appeared in 930 games for six teams during eleven seasons, most of them with the Brooklyn Dodgers; also a member of the 1941 World Series champion New York Yankees.
- April 14 – Bob Barthelson, 73, pitcher for the 1944 New York Giants, and one of several players who only appeared in the major leagues during World War II.
- April 25 – Edna Scheer, 73, All-American Girls Professional Baseball League pitcher for the 1950 Rockford Peaches champion team.
- April 27 – Brooks Lawrence, 75, All-Star pitcher for the St. Louis Cardinals and the Cincinnati Redlegs/Reds from 1954 through 1960.
- April 28 – Jack Merson, 78, infielder who played from 1951 to 1953 for the Pittsburgh Pirates and the Boston Red Sox.
- April 29 – Buck Varner, 69, backup outfielder who played briefly for the 1952 Washington Senators.

=== May ===
- May 3 – Ed Chapman, 94, pitcher for the 1934 Washington Senators.
- May 10 – Carden Gillenwater, 81, backup outfielder for the St. Louis Cardinals, Brooklyn Dodgers, Boston Braves and Washington Senators who appeared in 335 games over five seasons between 1940 and 1948.
- May 14 – Sarah Mavis Dabbs, 78, All-American Girls Professional Baseball League outfielder.
- May 18 – Doyle Lade, 79, pitcher for the Chicago Cubs from 1946 to 1950.
- May 23 – Thomas P. Johnson, 85, prominent Pittsburgh attorney and minority owner of the Pirates between 1946 and 1984.
- May 27 – Jane Stoll, 71, All-American Girls Professional Baseball League outfielder, and a veteran of three champion clubs between 1947 and 1954.
- May 31 – Hank Ruszkowski, 74, catcher who got into 40 games over three seasons for the Cleveland Indians in the mid-1940s.

=== June ===
- June 2 – Ellis Clary, 83, infielder for the Washington Senators and St. Louis Browns from 1942 through 1945 and coach for Washington from 1955 to 1960; later worked as a scout for 32 years.
- June 5 – Don Liddle, 75, pitcher for the New York Giants during Game 1 of the 1954 World Series when teammate Willie Mays made his famous over-the-shoulder catch.
- June 13 – Bobby Tiefenauer, 70, knuckleball reliever who pitched in 179 games for six different teams during a ten-year career that stretched between 1952 and 1968.
- June 17 – Joe Albanese, 66, pitcher for the 1958 Washington Senators, who also had a significant career in the minor leagues.
- June 19 – Tokuji Iida, 76, Hall of Fame first baseman and manager who played for the Nankai Hawks from 1947 to 1957 and the Kokutestu Swallows from 1957 to 1963 and managed the Sankei Atoms from 1966 to 1968 and the 1969 Nankai Hawks.
- June 21 – Bud Stewart, 84, outfielder who was the American League runner-up in triples with 1948 Washington Senators; also played for Pittsburgh Pirates, New York Yankees and Chicago White Sox during his nine-year, 773-game MLB career.
- June 23 – Bob Tillman, 63, catcher for the Boston Red Sox (1962–1967), New York Yankees (1967) and Atlanta Braves (1968–1970) who caught no-hitters in 1962 and 1965 and belted three home runs in a single game on July 30, 1969, at Philadelphia.
- June 29 – Ollie Vanek, 91, minor league player-manager who discovered future Hall of Famer Stan Musial for the St. Louis Cardinals and encouraged him to switch from pitching to the outfield; later, longtime scout for St. Louis and the New York Mets.

=== July ===
- July 14 – Georges Maranda, 68, Canadian pitcher who played for the San Francisco Giants in 1960 and the Minnesota Twins in 1962.
- July 20 – Leo Egan, 86, Boston sportscaster and a member of the radio and TV announcing team for the Braves and Red Sox in 1949 and 1950.
- July 20 – Jim Suchecki, 73, pitcher from 1950 through 1952 for the Boston Red Sox, St. Louis Browns and Pittsburgh Pirates.

=== August ===
- August 6 – Marv Felderman, 64, backup catcher for the 1942 Chicago Cubs.
- August 12 – Noboru Akiyama, 66, Hall of Fame NPB pitcher who played for the Taiyo Whales from 1956 to 1967.
- August 14 – Ken Heintzelman, 84, pitcher for the Pittsburgh Pirates and Philadelphia Phillies between 1937 and 1952; who led National League in shutouts in 1949 and a member of the Phillies' pennant winners in 1950; his son, Tom, was an MLB infielder.
- August 21 – Russ Kerns, 79, pinch-hitter who played briefly for the 1945 Detroit Tigers.
- August 22 – Bill Bradford, 78, pitcher for the 1956 Kansas City Athletics.
- August 26 – Ed Rakow, 65, pitcher for the Los Angeles Dodgers (1960), Kansas City Athletics (1961–1963), Detroit Tigers (1964–1965) and Atlanta Braves (1967), who later played and coached in the Senior Professional Baseball Association.
- August 27 – Bob Mahoney, 72, who pitched from 1951 to 1952 for the Chicago White Sox and St. Louis Browns.
- August 29 – Fern Bell, 87, backup outfielder for the Pittsburgh Pirates from 1939 to 1940.
- August 31 – Dolores Moore, 67, All-American Girls Professional Baseball League infielder.

=== September ===
- September 3 – Clyde Sukeforth, 98, catcher for the Cincinnati Reds and Brooklyn Dodgers (1926–1934 and 1945); scouted Jackie Robinson and was his first MLB manager as acting skipper of 1947 Dodgers; coached and scouted for Brooklyn and the Pittsburgh Pirates, where he recommended the drafting of Roberto Clemente.
- September 4 – Pinky May, 89, All-Star second baseman for the Philadelphia Phillies from 1939 to 1943, who led his team in seven offensive categories in 1940, including a .293 batting average and a .371 on-base percentage; longtime minor league manager; father of Milt May.
- September 7 – Nick Tremark, 87, outfielder for the Brooklyn Dodgers from 1934 through 1936.
- September 14 – George Myatt, 86, major league infielder, coach and manager during a professional career that spanned more than four decades; as interim skipper of Phillies (two games in 1968 and 54 games in 1969), his teams went 21–35.
- September 16 – John Perkovich, 76, pitcher for the 1950 Chicago White Sox.
- September 17 – Rutherford "Chico" Salmon, 59, Panamanian infielder for the Cleveland Indians and Baltimore Orioles from 1964 to 1972, who batted a crucial pinch-hit during the 1970 World Series.
- September 22 – Bill Sommers, 77, backup infielder for the 1950 St. Louis Browns.
- September 23 – Aurelio Rodríguez, 52, Mexican third baseman who appeared in 2,017 games, over 1,200 of them for the Detroit Tigers, over 17 seasons (1967–1983) for seven teams; won a Gold Glove (1976) and retired with the sixth most games at his position.
- September 29 – Lynn Lovenguth, 77, longtime minor-league hurler and relief pitcher who got into 16 MLB games for the 1955 Philadelphia Phillies and 1957 St. Louis Cardinals.

=== October ===
- October 1 – Charlie Brewster, 83, backup infielder who played in 69 games for the Reds, Phillies, Cubs and Indians between 1943 and 1946; led four minor leagues in stolen bases between 1937 and 1942.
- October 4 – Chuck Oertel, 69, backup outfielder for the 1958 Baltimore Orioles.
- October 17 – Donna Jogerst, 68, All-American Girls Professional Baseball League player.
- October 22 – Hank Wyse. 82, pitcher who helped the Chicago Cubs clinch the 1945 National League title, going 22–10 with a 2.68 ERA; posted a 0–1 (7.04) mark in three World Series games; appeared in 251 MLB games over eight seasons between 1942 and 1951.
- October 23 – Benny Culp, 86, catcher for the Philadelphia Phillies who played in 15 games between 1942 and 1944; served as a coach for the Phils in 1946 and 1947.
- October 26 – Ruth Lessing, 75, three-time All-Star catcher in the All-American Girls Professional Baseball League.
- October 28 – Andújar Cedeño, 31, Dominican shortstop for the Astros, Padres and Tigers from 1990 through 1996, who hit for the cycle in a 1992 game.

=== November ===
- November 2 – Eddie Collins Jr., 83, son of the Hall of Fame second baseman; backup outfielder for the Philadelphia Athletics between 1939 and 1942, who later worked in the Philadelphia Phillies' front office.
- November 5 – Willard Marshall, 79, All-Star outfielder for the New York Giants, Boston Braves, Cincinnati Reds and Chicago White Sox from 1942 to 1955, who in 1947 tied a National League record by hitting a three-home run game, and in 1951 became the second OF in major league history to play an error-less season.
- November 5 – Harry Taylor, 81, pitcher for the Brooklyn Dodgers and Boston Red Sox between 1946 and 1952, who started Game 4 of the 1947 World Series for the Dodgers.
- November 14 – Len Gabrielson, 85, first baseman who appeared in five games for the Philadelphia Phillies in 1939; his son and namesake played in 708 games over nine MLB seasons between 1960 and 1970.
- November 25 – Hugh Alexander, 83, outfielder for the 1937 Cleveland Indians, who later became a legendary scout for 61 years after losing his left hand in an oil-field accident; known as "Uncle Hughie", he signed multiple star players for five teams, notably the Los Angeles Dodgers.
- November 27 – Clara Chiano, 79, American Girls Professional Baseball League player.

=== December ===
- December 1 – Barbara Gates, 66, All-American Girls Professional Baseball League player.
- December 1 – Terry Wilshusen, 51, pitcher for the 1973 California Angels.
- December 3 – Red Nonnenkamp, 80, utility outfielder/first baseman from 1933 to 1940 for the Pittsburgh Pirates and Boston Red Sox.
- December 10 – Willard Nixon, 72, Boston Red Sox pitcher (1950–1958) best remembered for his success against the New York Yankees.
- December 12 – Red Barkley, 88, infielder for 1937 St. Louis Browns, 1939 Boston Bees and 1943 Brooklyn Dodgers who appeared in 63 MLB games.
- December 13 – Jake Jones, 80, first baseman for the Chicago White Sox and the Boston Red Sox in the 1940s, and also a highly decorated World War II veteran for his heroic actions as an aviator.
- December 14 – Al Vincent, 93, longtime minor-league player and manager who coached in MLB for a dozen seasons with the Detroit Tigers, Baltimore Orioles, Philadelphia Phillies and Kansas City Athletics between 1943 and 1967.
- December 15 – Bubba Floyd, 83, shortstop for the 1944 Tigers.
- December 19 – Lou Polli, 99, Italian-born relief pitcher for the 1932 St. Louis Browns and the 1944 New York Giants.
- December 19 – Lou Thuman, 84, outfielder for the Washington Senators from 1939 and 1940 seasons.
- December 27 – Roy Partee, 83, backup catcher for the Boston Red Sox and St. Louis Browns in the mid-1940s; longtime scout.
- December 31 – Fritz Dorish, 79, pitcher for the Boston Red Sox, St. Louis Browns, Baltimore Orioles and Chicago White Sox over all or parts of ten seasons from 1947 to 1956; later a pitching coach for Red Sox and Atlanta Braves.
