= Starling Marte =

Dominican baseball player (born 1988)

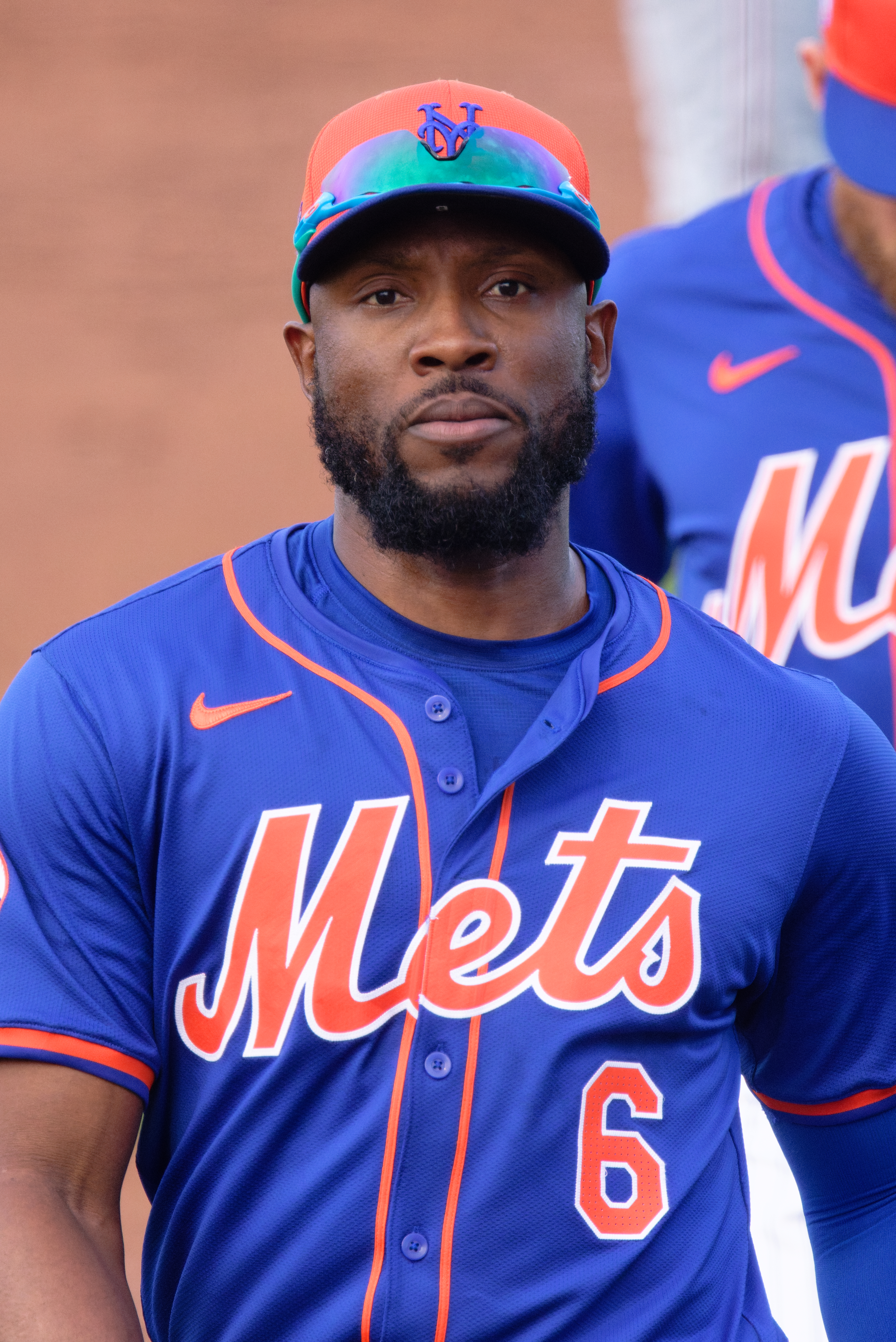
- Marte with the Mets in 2024

Free agent
- Outfielder
- Born: October 9, 1988 (age 38); Santo Domingo, Dominican Republic
- Bats: Right Throws: Right

MLB debut
- July 26, 2012, for the Pittsburgh Pirates

MLB statistics (through 2026 season)
- Batting average: .284
- Hits: 1,676
- Home runs: 165
- Runs batted in: 681
- Stolen bases: 363
- Stats at Baseball Reference

Teams
- Pittsburgh Pirates (2012–2019); Arizona Diamondbacks (2020); Miami Marlins (2020–2021); Oakland Athletics (2021); New York Mets (2022–2025); Kansas City Royals (2026)

Career highlights and awards
- 2× All-Star (2016, 2022); 2× Gold Glove Award (2015, 2016); MLB stolen base leader (2021) (Note: In 2021, Marte spent time with both the Miami Marlins (22 stolen bases), who are in the National League, and the Oakland Athletics (25 stolen bases), who are in the American League, so he did not lead either league, but his 47 steals led the MLB by 7 over runner-up Whit Merrifield, who led the American League with 40.)

Starling Javier Marte (born October 9, 1988) is a Dominican professional baseball outfielder who is a free agent. He has previously played in Major League Baseball (MLB) for the Pittsburgh Pirates, Arizona Diamondbacks, Miami Marlins, Oakland Athletics, New York Mets, and Kansas City Royals. He made his MLB debut in 2012 with the Pirates. Marte is a two-time MLB All-Star and a two-time Gold Glove Award winner. In 2021, he led the Major leagues with 47 stolen bases. He is the active leader in stolen bases with 363.

== Early life ==
Marte grew up on the outskirts of Santo Domingo, the capital of the Dominican Republic. After his mother's death when he was nine, his grandmother raised him.

== Career ==
=== Pittsburgh Pirates ===
==== Minor leagues ====
Marte signed with the Pittsburgh Pirates in 2007 and was primarily a center fielder during his time in the minors. In 2010, he played 60 games for the Pirates' Single-A affiliate, the Bradenton Marauders, ending with a batting average of .315. He hit 16 doubles and five triples that season while also stealing 22 bases. Marte represented the Pirates at the 2011 All-Star Futures Game. In 2011, while playing for the Altoona Curve, Marte was an Eastern League Mid-Season All-Star and Post-Season All-Star, a Baseball America Double-A All-Star, a Topps Double-A All-Star, and a Milb.com organization All-Star. On August 15, 2011, Marte was named the EL's Player of the Week. Marte also won the Eastern League batting title with a .332 batting average and was named the Eastern League Rookie of the Year. Marte was added to the Pirates' 40-man roster on November 18.

Marte was ranked number 73 on Baseball America's Top 100 Prospects list in February 2012 and number 56 on Baseball Prospectus's Top 101 Prospect list in February 2012. In 2012, while playing for the Indianapolis Indians, Marte was named an International League Mid-Season All-Star. On July 2, 2012, Marte was named the International League Player of the Week.

==== 2012 ====
On July 26, 2012, the Pirates promoted Marte from Indianapolis Indians, becoming the first graduate of the Pirates' Latin American complex, located in the Dominican Republic, to reach the major leagues. He hit a home run on the first pitch he faced in his major league career, off Houston Astros pitcher Dallas Keuchel. The hit made Marte the third player in Pirates' franchise history to homer in his first at-bat and the first to do it since Don Leppert in 1961. He also became the first Pirate to homer on the first pitch of his major league career since Walter Mueller did so in 1922. In his rookie season, Marte played in 47 games, batting .257/.300/.457 with 5 home runs, 17 RBI, and 12 stolen bases.

==== 2013 ====
On June 25, 2013, Marte hit two home runs in a 9–4 victory over the Seattle Mariners, marking the first multi-home run game of his career. Marte made his postseason debut on October 1, going 2–5 with a double and a run scored during the National League Wild Card Game against the Cincinnati Reds. He hit the first postseason home run of his career on October 4, during Game 2 of the National League Division Series, off of Shelby Miller of the St. Louis Cardinals. Across 135 games for the Pirates in 2013, Marte batted .280/.343/.441 with 12 home runs, 35 RBI, and 41 stolen bases.

==== 2014 ====
Marte and the Pirates finalized a 6-year, $31 million deal on March 28, 2014. On August 18, he had his second career multi-homer game in a 7–3 loss to the Atlanta Braves. Across 135 games for the Pirates in 2014, Marte batted .291/.356/.453 with 13 home runs, 56 RBI, and 30 stolen bases.

==== 2015: First Gold Glove ====
In 2015, Marte played in 153 games, batting .287/.337/.444 with 19 home runs, 81 RBI, and 30 stolen bases. After the season, he won his first career Gold Glove Award as the best defensive left fielder in the National League.

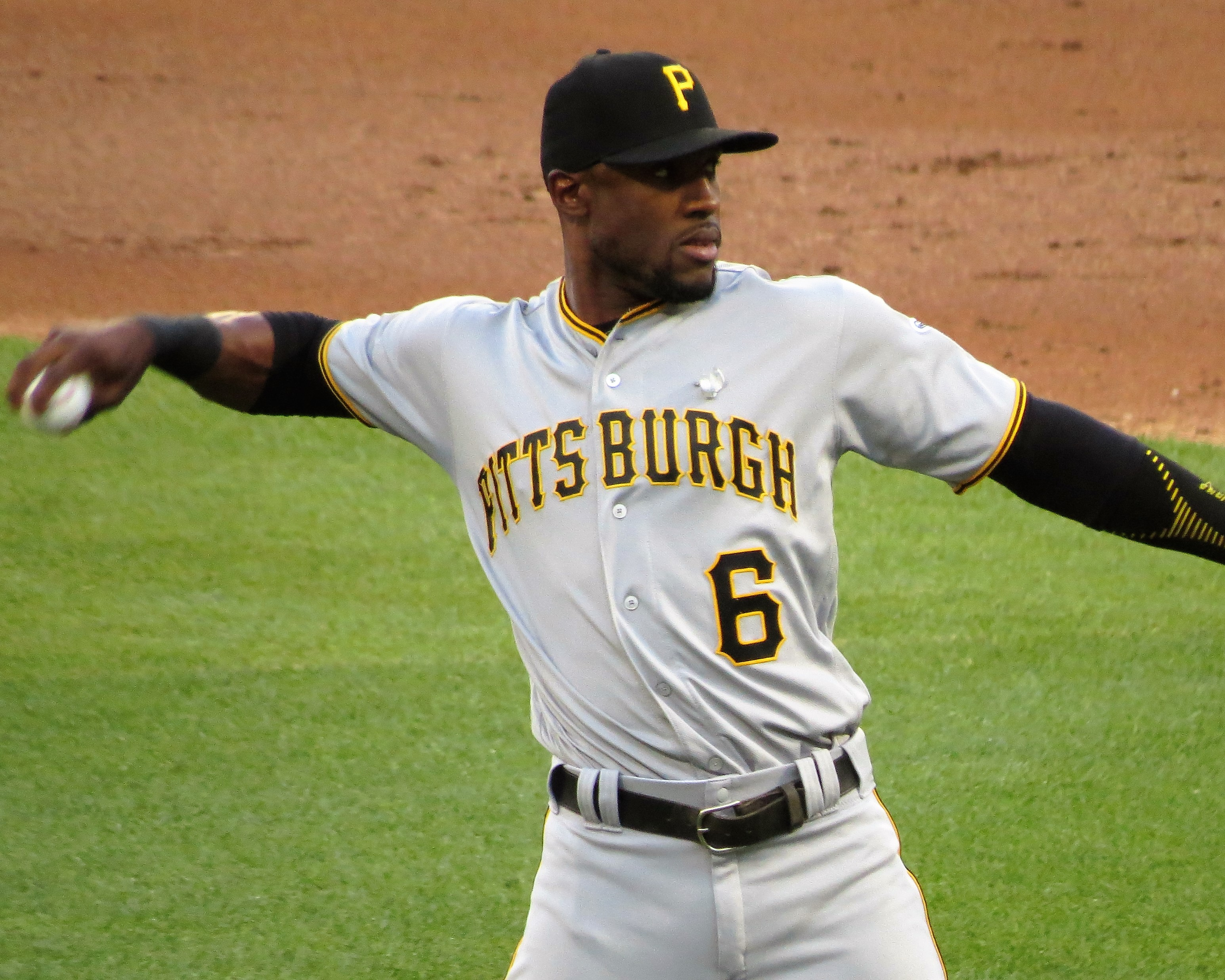
Marte with the Pirates in 2016

==== 2016: First All-Star season & second Gold Glove ====
After hitting to the ninth best batting average in the National League (.316) and stealing the second most bases (27) during the first half of the season, Marte was selected to replace an injured Yoenis Cespedes in the first All-Star Game appearance of his career.

Marte played in 129 games in 2016, batting .311/.362/456 with 9 home runs, 46 RBI, and 47 stolen bases. After the season, he won his second career Gold Glove Award.

==== 2017 ====
On April 18, 2017, Marte was suspended 80 games without pay due to the use of nandrolone, a type of performance-enhancing drug that violates the MLB's drug agreement. He was also deemed ineligible to play in the postseason, though the Pirates failed to qualify. Marte issued a statement afterwards, reading: "I have been informed that I have tested positive in one of the tests that are regularly done in my job. In this very difficult moment, I apologize to my family, my fans, and baseball in general. Neglect and lack of knowledge have led me to this mistake with the high price to pay of being away from the field that I enjoy and love so much. With much embarrassment and helplessness, I ask for forgiveness for unintentionally disrespecting so many people who have trusted in my work and have supported me so much. I promise to learn the lesson that this ordeal has left me. God bless you."

Across 77 games in 2017, Marte batted .275/.333/379 with 7 home runs, 31 RBI, 21 stolen bases.

==== 2018 ====
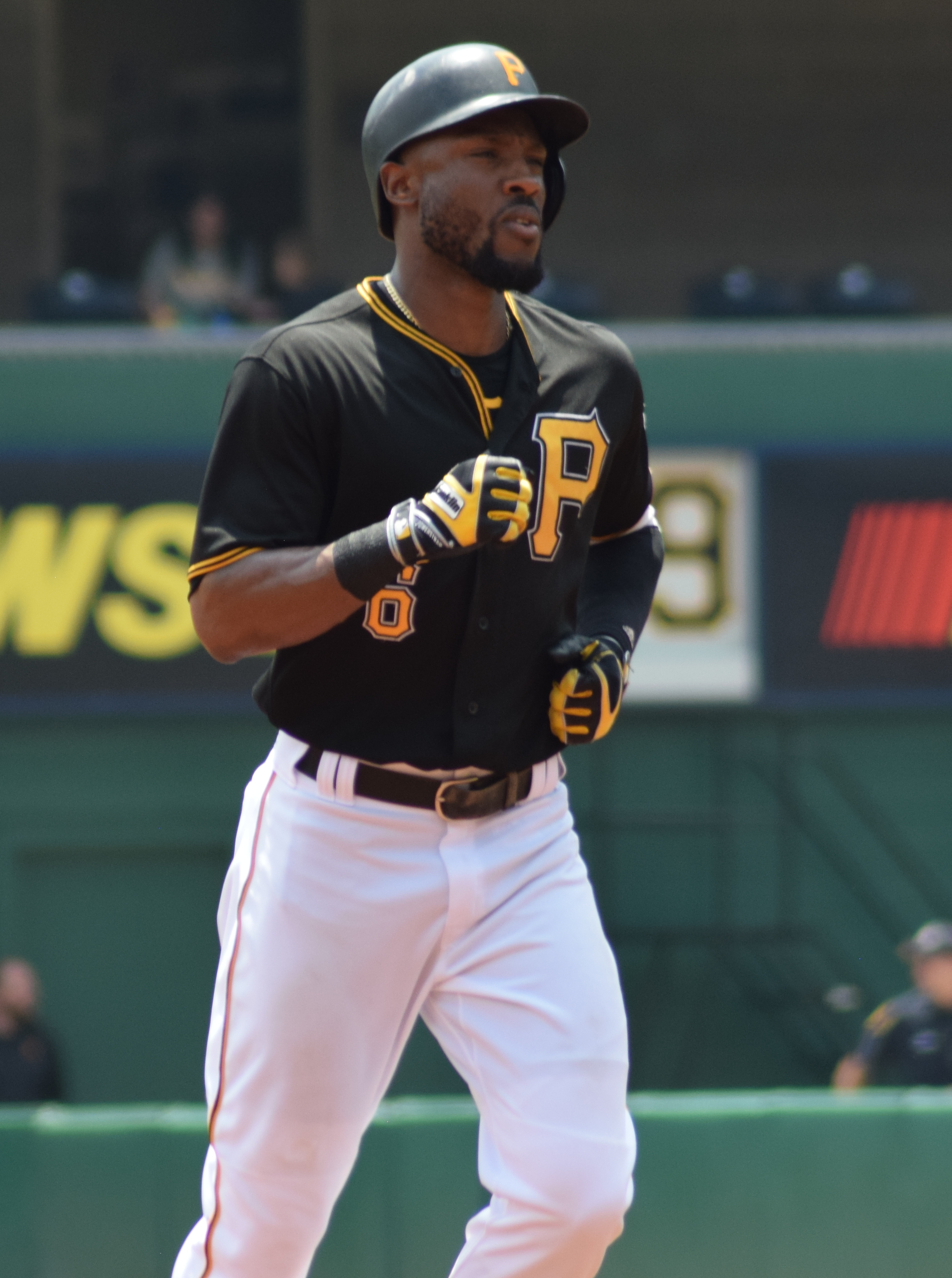
Marte with the Pirates in 2018

In 2018, Marte played in 145 games, batting .277/.327/.460 with 20 home runs, 72 RBI, and 33 stolen bases. He and Jean Segura were the only two MLB players to have stolen 20 or more bases each season since 2013.

==== 2019 ====
On July 13, 2019, in a game against the Chicago Cubs, Marte hit the 99th and 100th home runs of his career, two solo shots off of Jon Lester in the 6th inning and Randy Rosario in the 8th. He became the second player in Pirates franchise history to hit 100 home runs and steal 200 bases, second only to Barry Bonds, who recorded 176 homers and 251 steals with the team. Across 132 games for the Pirates in 2019, Marte batted .295/.342/.503 and set career-highs with 23 home runs and 82 RBI. However, on defense, he had a -11 Defensive Runs Saved (DRS) rating, the lowest in the major leagues among center fielders.

=== Arizona Diamondbacks ===
==== 2020 ====
On January 27, 2020, the Pirates traded Marte and cash considerations to the Arizona Diamondbacks in exchange for Liover Peguero, Brennan Malone, and international bonus pool signing money.

=== Miami Marlins ===
On August 31, 2020, the Diamondbacks traded Marte to the Miami Marlins for Caleb Smith, Humberto Mejía and Julio Frias. Across 61 games between Arizona and Miami, Marte slashed .281/.340/.430 with six home runs, 27 RBI, and 10 stolen bases during the shortened 60-game season. During Game 1 of the 2020 National League Wild Card Series, Marte had two hits and scored a run before having his left hand broken by a fastball in the ninth inning. The Marlins would defeat the Chicago Cubs 5–1 at Wrigley Field, giving Miami its first playoff victory since the 2003 postseason.

==== 2021: MLB stolen bases leader ====
Marte was placed on the injured list on April 20, 2021, with a fractured rib. A month later, he would enter his rehab assignment with the Jacksonville Jumbo Shrimp and return to the Marlins on May 28. Marte was named NL Player of the Week for June 7–13, the first Marlins player since 2017. In 7 games that week, he batted .500 (14-for-28), two home runs, one double, five RBI, and a 1.298 OPS. He also stole four bases without being caught.

On July 18, Marte rejected a $30 million extension offer from the Marlins.

=== Oakland Athletics ===
On July 28, 2021, the Marlins traded Marte along with cash considerations to the Oakland Athletics in exchange for Jesús Luzardo. Across 120 games between Miami and Oakland, Marte batted .310/.383/.458 with 12 home runs, 55 RBI, and stole an MLB-leading 47 bases in 2021.

=== New York Mets ===
On November 30, 2021, Marte signed a four-year, $78 million contract with the New York Mets.

==== 2022: Second All-Star season ====
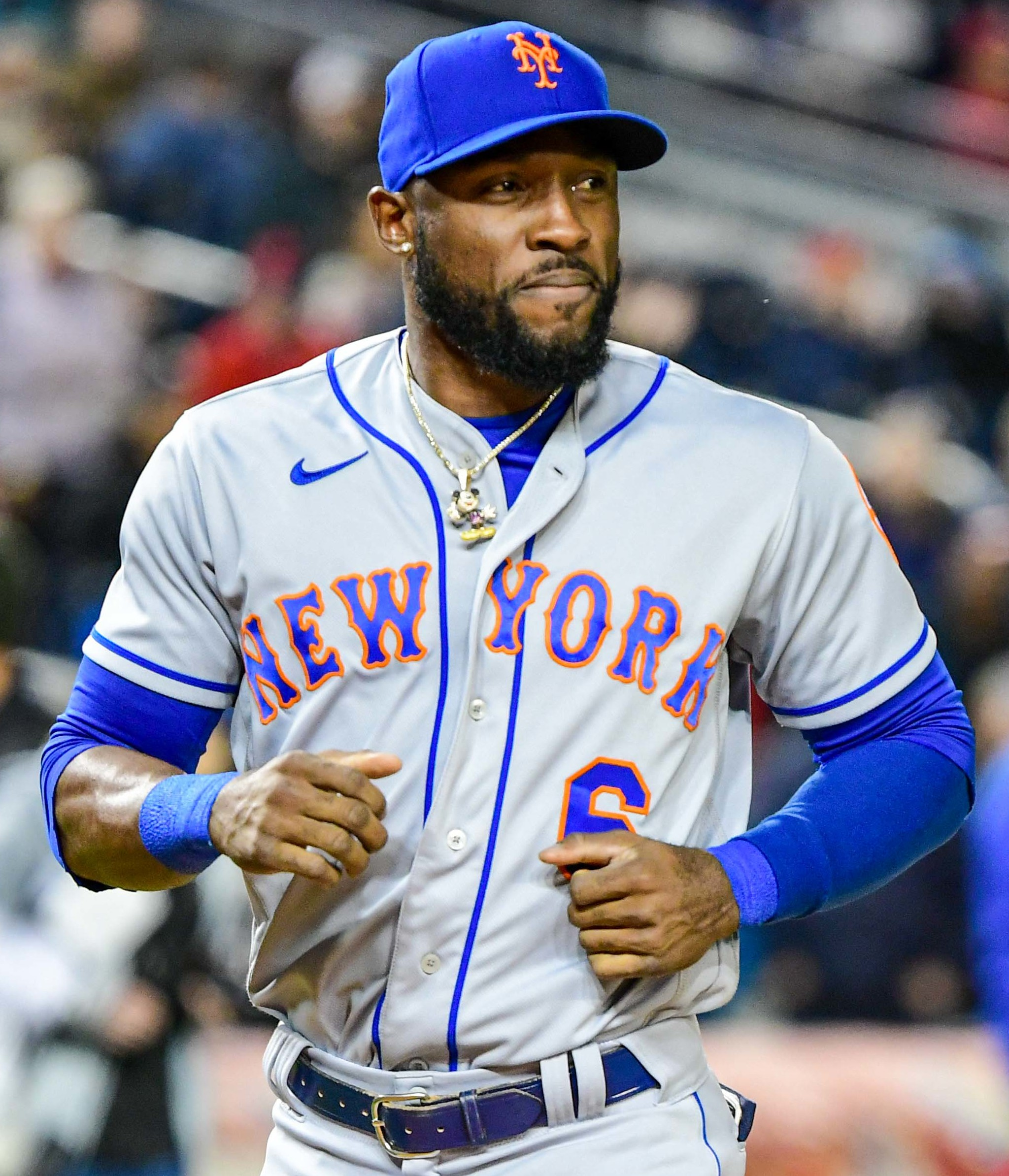
Marte with the Mets in 2022

After hitting to a .291 average with an .881 OPS during the first half of the 2022 season, Marte was selected to play in the All-Star Game for the second time in his career. Despite suffering from a groin injury throughout the year, Marte played in 118 games, batting .292/.347/.468 with 16 home runs, 63 RBI, and 18 stolen bases.

==== 2023 ====
After double groin surgery in November, Marte's injuries persisted into 2023. He missed games in April with a neck strain, was placed on the injured list in July and August due to migraines, and finished the season early after suffering another groin injury. Across 86 games in 2023, Marte batted .248/.301/.324 with five home runs, 28 RBI, and 24 stolen bases.

==== 2024 ====
Marte returned to the team and hit the first home run of the Mets' 2024 season on Opening Day, March 29, against the Milwaukee Brewers in a 3–1 loss. On April 6, Marte recorded the 1,500th hit of his career, a first inning single, off of Miles Mikolas of the St. Louis Cardinals. On April 17, he hit the 150th home run of his career, a two-run shot off of Bailey Falter of the Pittsburgh Pirates. Marte missed two months of the season due to a bone bruise in his right knee, and he did not return to the team until August 18. Across 94 games in 2024, Marte batted .269/.327/.388 with seven home runs, 40 RBI, and 16 stolen bases.

On October 3, in Game 3 the 2024 National League Wild Card Series, Marte hit a two-out RBI single in the 9th inning off of Devin Williams to insure a 4–2 victory and clinch the series win over the Milwaukee Brewers. In Game 5 of the National League Championship Series on October 18, Marte had the best postseason game of his career, as he hit three doubles to cash in 3 RBI on four hits, defeating the Los Angeles Dodgers 12–6. Across 13 games of the 2024 MLB postseason, Marte batted .277/.345/.362 with no home runs, nine RBI, and one stolen base.

==== 2025 ====
In February, the Mets announced that Marte would be moved from the outfield to serve as a part-time designated hitter to avoid future injuries. On April 23, Marte hit a walk-off single in the 10th inning against the Philadelphia Phillies. In doing so, he clinched the Mets second ever perfect seven-game home stand in franchise history. On July 8, Marte was placed on the injured list with a right knee bruise, and he returned to the Mets lineup on July 22. Across 98 games in 2025, Marte batted .270/.335/.410 with nine home runs, 34 RBI, and seven stolen bases.

=== Kansas City Royals ===
==== 2026 ====
On March 2, 2026, the Kansas City Royals announced that they had signed Marte to a one-year, $1 million contract. He played in 59 contests for Kansas City, batting .242/.298/.314 with two home runs, 14 RBI, and two stolen bases. Marte was designated for assignment by the Royals on August 17. He cleared waivers and was released on August 19.

== Personal life ==
Marte's mother died when he was nine years old. Starling was then raised by his grandmother, who died in May 2022.

Marte has three children, sons Starling Jr. and Smerling and daughter Tiana, with his late wife, Noelia Brazoban. In May 2020, Brazoban suffered a heart attack and died while in the hospital awaiting surgery on a broken ankle. Upon his return to the Mets after being placed on the bereavement list, Marte, just as he had during his very first Major League at-bat, hit a home run on the first pitch he faced from Colorado Rockies starter Germán Márquez, dedicating his hit to his "loved ones up in heaven."

In August 2023, Marte got engaged to Elianny Santana. They married in the Dominican Republic in December of that year.

== See also ==
- List of Major League Baseball career hit by pitch leaders
- List of Major League Baseball career stolen bases leaders
- List of Major League Baseball players suspended for performance-enhancing drugs
- List of Major League Baseball players with a home run in their first major league at bat
