= Esix Snead =

American baseball player (born 1976)

- Outfielder
- Born: June 7, 1976 (age 50); Fort Myers, Florida, U.S.
- Batted: Switch Threw: Right

MLB debut
- September 3, 2002, for the New York Mets

Last MLB appearance
- May 21, 2004, for the New York Mets

MLB statistics
- Batting average: .308
- Home runs: 1
- Runs batted in: 3
- Stolen bases: 4
- Stats at Baseball Reference

Teams
- New York Mets (2002, 2004)

Esix Snead (born June 7, 1976) is an American former professional baseball outfielder for the New York Mets of the Major League Baseball (MLB) (2002, 2004). Snead was known for his speed, with 507 stolen bases in only 9 minor league seasons, but only four in two brief appearances with the New York Mets.

== College career ==
Snead attended the University of Central Florida, playing both baseball and football.

== Professional career ==
=== St. Louis Cardinals ===
Snead was drafted by the St. Louis Cardinals in the 18th round of the 1998 Major League Baseball draft. Throughout his entire career, Snead hit for a low batting average, but still stole high numbers of bases. In 1998 with the Low-A New Jersey Cardinals, he hit .233 and stole 42 bases in 58 games. With the Single-A Peoria Chiefs and High-A Potomac Cannons in 1999, he hit under the Mendoza Line, but stole 64 bases in 126 games. The 2000 season was Snead's career year. Playing for the Cannons again, he led all minor leaguers in stolen bases and stole a Carolina League record 109 bases, breaking Lenny Dykstra's record, and made the All-Star game. In 2001, his final season in the Cardinals' organization, he played for Double-A New Haven.

== New York Mets ==
On November 20, 2001, he was claimed off waivers by the New York Mets.

Snead played for Double-A Binghamton in 2002 and hit .252 with 64 stolen bases. He was called up to the majors and made his major league debut on September 3. On September 21, against the Montreal Expos, he got his first major league hit, a single, and also ended the game with a three-run walk-off home run. He spent all of 2003 with the Triple-A Norfolk Tides and produced more of the same, a .220 batting average and 61 stolen bases. His batting average improved in 2004 to .264 and he played 1 game in the majors for the Mets.

== Atlanta Braves ==
Snead became a free agent at the end of the season and signed a minor league contract with the Atlanta Braves on November 10, 2004. He stole 46 bases for Triple-A Richmond, but his season was marred by a suspension. In a game against the Syracuse SkyChiefs, pitcher Dave Bush threw a ball between Snead's legs causing Snead to have to be held back by the catcher. After drawing a walk, he charged Bush while walking to first base and threw his batting helmet at him, causing both benches to clear. 20 members of the Braves were fined including Snead who also drew a 10-game suspension.

== Baltimore Orioles ==
The Baltimore Orioles signed him on January 24, 2006, and he played for Triple-A Ottawa. In 41 games, he batted .220 with 15 steals. The Orioles released Snead on May 21.
