= 2000 Junior League World Series =

Tournament information
- Location: Taylor, Michigan
- Dates: August 14–19

Final positions
- Champions: Aiea, Hawaii
- Runner-up: Langley, Canada

The 2000 Junior League World Series took place from August 14–19 in Taylor, Michigan, United States. Aiea, Hawaii defeated Langley, Canada in the championship game.

== Teams ==
United States	International
Baxter Springs, Kansas; Baxter Springs; Central	Langley, British Columbia; Langley; Canada
South Vineland, New Jersey; South Vineland; East	Ramstein, Germany; KMC; Europe
Palm Harbor, Florida; Palm Harbor; South	Hagåtña, Guam; Central; Far East
Aiea, Hawaii; Aiea; West	San Pedro, Mexico; Valle; Latin America

== Results ==
Upper round 1	Upper round 2	Upper final	World Championship
—	New Jersey	9
—	Mexico	2
1–0	New Jersey	2
1–0	Canada	4
—	Canada	1
—	Florida	0
2–0	Canada	3
2–0	Hawaii	7
—	Guam	0
—	Hawaii	6
1–0	Hawaii	4
1–0	Kansas	3
—	Kansas
—	Germany	3–0	Hawaii	2	–
3–1	Canada	1	–
Lower round 1	Lower round 2	Lower round 3	Lower final
1–1	New Jersey	1
0–1	Mexico	0	1–1	Florida	6	2–1	Canada	3
0–1	Florida	1	2–1	Florida	12	3–1	Florida	1
2–1	Kansas	0
1–1	Kansas	6
0–1	Guam	5	1–1	Guam	3
0–1	Germany	4

2000 Junior League World Series Champions
Aiea LL
Aiea, Hawaii
