= 2000 Big League World Series =

Tournament details
- Country: United States
- City: Tucson, Arizona
- Dates: 6–12 August 2000
- Teams: 9

Final positions
- Champions: Fraser Valley, Canada
- Runners-up: Jeffersonville, Indiana

The 2000 Big League World Series took place from August 6–12 in Tucson, Arizona, United States. Fraser Valley, Canada defeated Jeffersonville, Indiana in the championship game. It was Canada's first Little League championship in any division.

This was the final BLWS held in Tucson.

== Teams ==
United States	International
(Arizona) Tucson, Arizona; District 5 Host	Fraser Valley, British Columbia, Canada; Fraser Valley; Canada
(Indiana) Jeffersonville, Indiana; District 5 Central	Warsaw, Poland; Warsaw-O-Sielsko; Europe
(New Jersey) Bridgewater, New Jersey; District 17; East	(Guam) Hagåtña, Guam; Central; Far East
(Virginia) Roanoke, Virginia; District 12; South	Yabucoa, Puerto Rico; Juan A. Bibiloni; Latin America
(California) Santee, California; District 41; West	

== Results ==
United States Pool

Team	W	L	Rs	Ra
Indiana	3	1	32	31
California	2	2	17	10
Arizona	2	2	33	27
New Jersey	2	2	19	24
Virginia	1	3	27	36

	(Arizona)	(California)	(Indiana)	(New Jersey)	(Virginia)
Arizona	–	1–3	14–9	8–4	10–11
California	3–1	–	1–2	3–4	10–3
Indiana	9–14	2–1	–	10–6	11–10
New Jersey	4–8	4–3	6–10	–	5–3
Virginia	11–10	3–10	10–11	3–5	–

International Pool

Team	W	L	Rs	Ra
Canada	2	1	26	10
Guam	2	1	25	16
Puerto Rico	2	1	31	20
Poland	0	3	10	46

	(Canada)	(Guam)	(Poland)	(Puerto Rico)
Canada	–	3–2	20–2	3–6
Guam	2–3	–	11–3	12–10
Poland	2–20	3–11	–	5–15
Puerto Rico	6–3	10–12	15–5	–

Elimination Round

Semifinals
3–1	Indiana	6
2–2	California	1
2–1	Canada	14
2–1	Guam	3

World Championship
4–1	Indiana	8
3–1	Canada	9

2000 Big League World Series Champions
Fraser Valley LL
Fraser Valley, Canada
