= 2000 Senior League World Series =

American youth baseball tournament

Tournament information
- Location: Kissimmee, Florida
- Dates: August 13–19, 2000

Final positions
- Champions: Panama City, Panama
- Runner-up: Pinellas Park, Florida

The 2000 Senior League World Series took place from August 13–19 in Kissimmee, Florida, United States. Panama City, Panama defeated Pinellas Park, Florida twice in the championship game.

== Teams ==
| United States | International |
|---|---|
| (Florida) Winter Park, Florida; District 3 Host | Surrey, British Columbia; Whalley; Canada |
| Des Moines, Iowa; Grandview; Central | Ramstein, Germany; KMC; Europe |
| Newark, Delaware; Newark National; East | (Guam) Hagåtña, Guam; Central; Far East |
| (Florida) Pinellas Park, Florida; Pinellas Park National; South | Panama City, Panama; Curundu; Latin America |
| (California) Union City, California; Union City American; West | |

== Results ==
Winner's Bracket

Opening Game
— | (Florida) Host | 0
— | California | 6

—
1–0 | California | 6
— | Canada | 3
— | Iowa | 5
— | Guam | 3
— | Germany | 0
— | Florida | 15
— | Delaware | 2
— | Panama | 4

—
2–0 | California | 10
1–0 | Iowa | 4
1–0 | Florida (F/10) | 4
1–0 | Panama | 3

Bracket Final
3–0 | California | 1
2–0 | Florida | 11

Loser's Bracket

—
1
0–1 | Delaware | 0
0–1 | Germany | 4
7
3
0–1 | Guam | 3
0–1 | (Florida) Host | 6
5

—
0–1 | Canada | 2
1–1 | (Florida) Host | 3
1–1 | Panama | 6
1–1 | Germany | 0

—
1–1 | Iowa | 5
2–1 | (Florida) Host | 15
3–1 | California | 4
2–1 | Panama | 8

Bracket Final
3–1 | (Florida) Host | 1
3–1 | Panama | 3

Placement Bracket

—
1
0–2 | Delaware | 5
2
7
3
6
0–2 | Guam | 4
5

—
0–2 | Canada | 0
1–2 | Delaware | 13
3–2 | California | 7
1–2 | Germany | 9

—
1–2 | Iowa | 1
2–2 | Delaware | 10
3–2 | (Florida) Host | 12
2–2 | Germany | 1

Third-place game
3–2 | Delaware | 6
4–2 | (Florida) Host | 4

Elimination Round

Semifinals
3–0 | California | 1
2–0 | Florida | 11
3–1 | (Florida) Host | 1
3–1 | Panama | 3

World championship
3–0 | Florida | 2 · 7
4–1 | Panama | 4 · 9
Third-place game
3–2 | Delaware | 6
4–2 | (Florida) Host | 4

2000 Senior League World Series Champions
Curundu LL
Panama City, Panama
