= Jack O'Loughlin (baseball) =

Australian baseball player (born 2000)

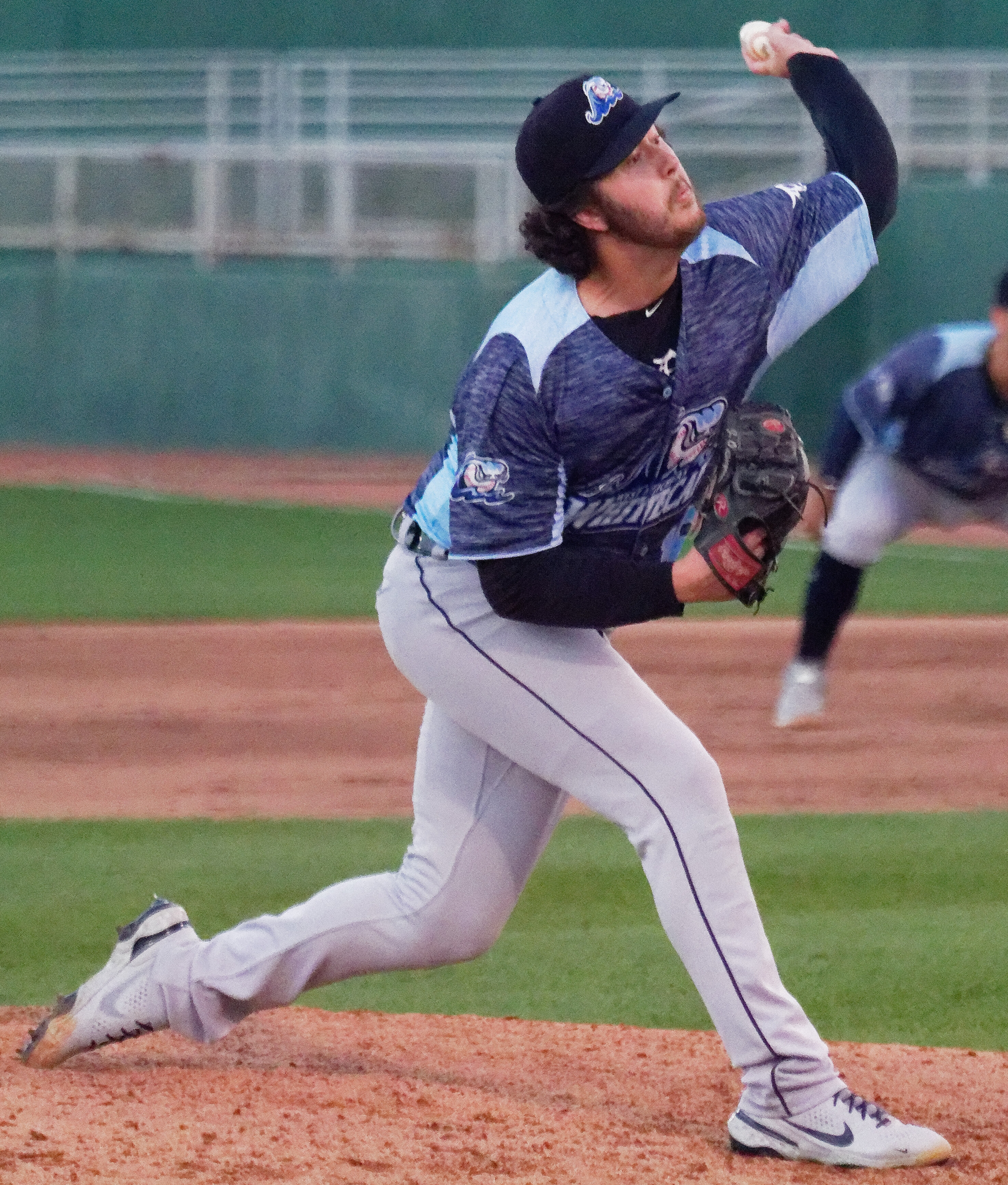
- O'Loughlin with the West Michigan Whitecaps in 2021

Free agent
- Pitcher
- Born: 14 March 2000 (age 26); Adelaide, Australia
- Bats: Left Throws: Left

Professional debut
- MLB: May 26, 2024, for the Oakland Athletics
- KBO: March 31, 2026, for the Samsung Lions

MLB statistics (through 2024 season)
- Win–loss record: 0–0
- Earned run average: 4.66
- Strikeouts: 6

KBO statistics (through 2026 season)
- Win–loss record: 5–5
- Earned run average: 4.86
- Strikeouts: 81
- Stats at Baseball Reference

Teams
- Oakland Athletics (2024); Samsung Lions (2026)

Jack Te Haki O'Loughlin (born 14 March 2000) is an Australian professional baseball pitcher who is a free agent. He has previously played in Major League Baseball for the Oakland Athletics and in the KBO League for the Samsung Lions.

== Career ==
=== Detroit Tigers ===
On 16 July 2016, O'Loughlin signed with the Detroit Tigers. In November 2016, O'Loughlin pitched for the Adelaide Bite, and became the youngest Australian Baseball League starting pitcher.

In 2018, O'Loughlin made his affiliated professional debut for the Low–A Connecticut Tigers, appearing in 7 games and logging a 4.35 ERA with 25 strikeouts in 20 2/3 innings of work. He returned to Connecticut in 2019, making 13 appearances (12 starts) and registering a 3.13 ERA with 49 strikeouts across 60 1/3 innings pitched.

O'Loughlin did not play in a game in 2020 due to the cancellation of the minor league season because of the COVID-19 pandemic. He returned to action in 2021, splitting the year between the rookie–level Florida Complex League Tigers, Low–A Lakeland Flying Tigers, and High–A West Michigan Whitecaps. On 18 July 2021, while pitching for Lakeland, he was named the Low-A Southeast Pitcher of the Week. In 14 cumulative starts, O'Loughlin worked to a 5–2 record and 2.64 ERA with 52 strikeouts in 61 1/3 innings pitched.

He spent the 2022 season back in West Michigan, recording a 4.01 ERA with 50 strikeouts in 51 2/3 innings pitched across 27 contests. In 2023, O'Loughlin split the year between West Michigan and the Triple–A Toledo Mud Hens. In 27 games (25 starts), he pitched to a cumulative 6–10 record and 3.99 ERA with 118 strikeouts across 124.0 innings of work. O'Loughlin elected free agency following the season on 6 November 2023.

=== Oakland Athletics ===
On 9 November 2023, O'Loughlin signed a minor league contract with the Oakland Athletics organization. In 10 games (8 starts) for the Triple–A Las Vegas Aviators, he compiled a 5.12 ERA with 44 strikeouts across 38 2/3 innings pitched. On 25 May 2024, O'Loughlin was selected to the 40-man roster and promoted to the major leagues for the first time. The next day, O'Loughlin made his major league debut. Entering in relief, he pitched three shutout innings, giving up two hits and a walk while striking out two against the Houston Astros. In 4 games for Oakland, he compiled a 4.66 ERA with 6 strikeouts over 9 2/3 innings pitched. O'Loughlin was designated for assignment by the Athletics on 11 September. He cleared waivers and was sent outright to Las Vegas on 13 September. O'Loughlin elected free agency following the season on 4 November.

=== Colorado Rockies ===
On 14 November 2024, O'Loughlin signed a minor league contract with the Colorado Rockies. He made 19 appearances (10 starts) for the rookie-level Arizona Complex League Rockies and Triple-A Albuquerque Isotopes, struggling to a combined 1-3 record and 6.70 ERA with 32 strikeouts across 45 2/3 innings pitched. O'Loughlin was released by the Rockies organization on 17 July 2025. Following the 2025 season, O'Loughlin played for the Adelaide Giants of the Australian Baseball League.

=== Samsung Lions ===
On 16 March 2026, O'Loughlin signed a six-week, $50,000 contract with the Samsung Lions of the KBO League as a temporary injury replacement for Matt Manning. Following the expiration of his initial deal, Samsung extended O'Loughlin's contract through 31 May. On 29 May, the club announced they had given him a second extension through 16 July. O'Loughlin started 17 contests for the club, compiling a 5–5 record and 4.86 ERA with 81 strikeouts across 83 1/3 innings pitched. O'Loughlin was released on 11 July, prior to his contract expiring, following the team's signing of Chris Paddack.

=== CTBC Brothers ===
On 30 July 2026, O'Loughlin signed with the CTBC Brothers of the Chinese Professional Baseball League. He was released on August 31 without appearing in a major level game for the Brothers.

== International career ==
O'Loughlin represented the Australia national baseball team in the 2023 World Baseball Classic, pitching in Australia's games against South Korea and the Czech Republic. O'Loughlin was selected to play in the 2026 World Baseball Classic, where he got the win against Chinese Taipei. He fractured Chinese Taipei captain Chen Chieh-hsien's left index finger on a hit-by-pitch, ruling him out for the competition.
