= Liover Peguero =

Dominican baseball player (born 2000)

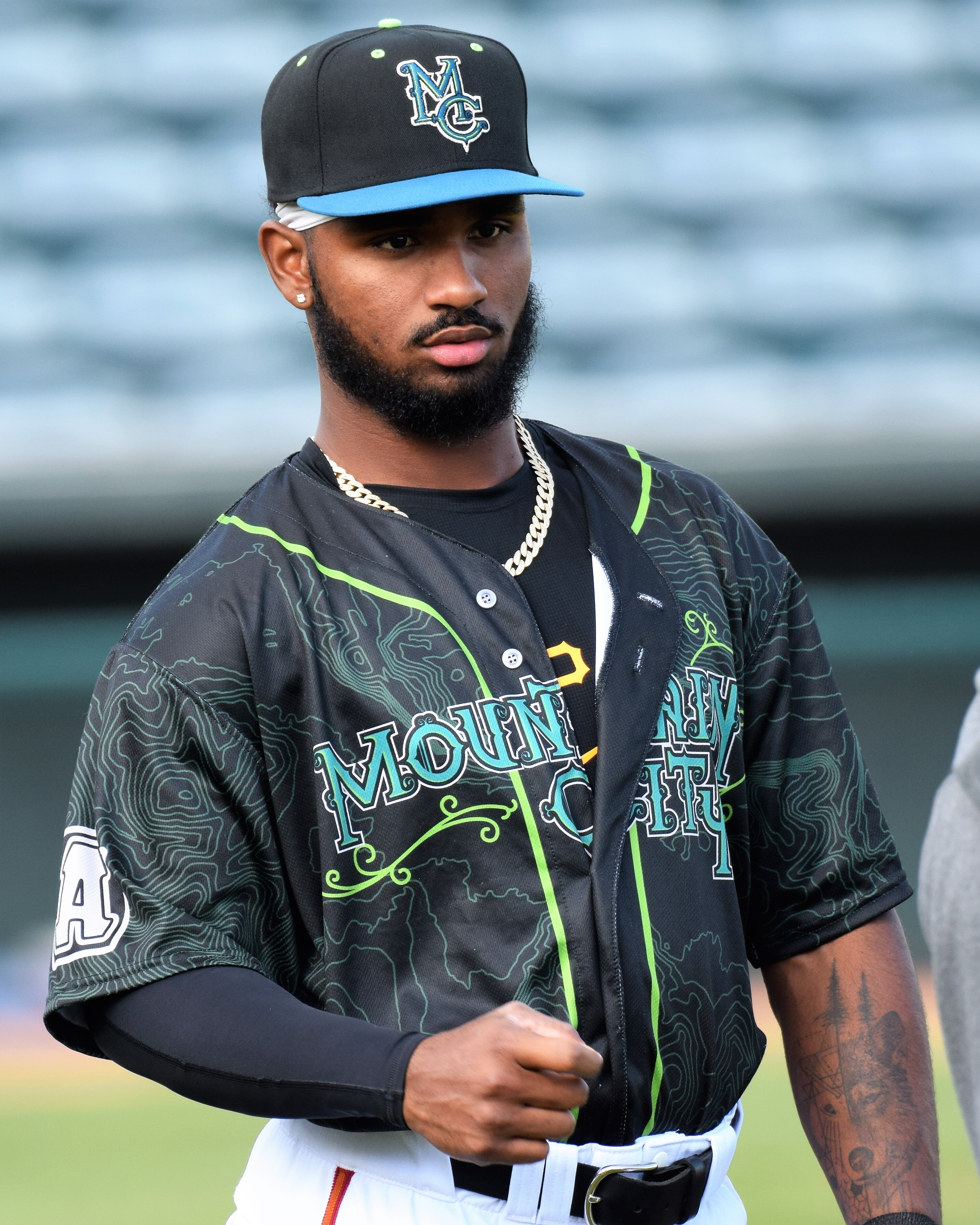
- Peguero with the Altoona Curve in 2022

Free agent
- Shortstop / Second baseman
- Born: December 31, 2000 (age 25); Higüey, Dominican Republic
- Bats: Right Throws: Right

MLB debut
- June 18, 2022, for the Pittsburgh Pirates

MLB statistics (through 2025 season)
- Batting average: .227
- Home runs: 11
- Runs batted in: 36
- Stats at Baseball Reference

Teams
- Pittsburgh Pirates (2022–2025)

Liover Peguero (born December 31, 2000) is a Dominican professional baseball shortstop who is a free agent. He has previously played in Major League Baseball (MLB) for the Pittsburgh Pirates.

== Career ==
=== Arizona Diamondbacks ===
Peguero signed with the Arizona Diamondbacks as an international free agent in July 2017. He spent his first professional season in 2018 with the Dominican Summer League Diamondbacks and Arizona League Diamondbacks, batting .259 with one home run and 21 runs batted in (RBI) over 41 games played. In 2019, he played for the Missoula Osprey and Hillsboro Hops and slashed .326/.382/.485 with five home runs, 38 RBI, and 11 stolen bases over 60 games.

=== Pittsburgh Pirates ===
On January 27, 2020, the Diamondbacks traded Peguero and Brennan Malone to the Pittsburgh Pirates for Starling Marte. He did not play in a game in 2020 due to the cancellation of the minor league season because of the COVID-19 pandemic. The Pirates invited him to their Spring Training in 2021. Peguero spent the 2021 season with the Greensboro Grasshoppers, slashing .270/.332/.444 with 14 home runs, 45 RBI, and 28 stolen bases over ninety games. On November 20, 2021, the Pirates added Peguero to their 40-man roster to protect him from the Rule 5 draft.

Peguero was promoted to the major leagues for the first time on June 17, 2022, replacing Tucupita Marcano. He made his major league debut the next day, getting one hit and a walk in four plate appearances in a 7–5 loss to the San Francisco Giants. In 2023, he played in 59 games for Pittsburgh, batting .237/.280/.374 with seven home runs, 26 RBI, and six stolen bases.

Peguero was optioned to the Triple–A Indianapolis Indians to begin the 2024 season. In 3 games for Pittsburgh, he went 2-for-10 (.200) with 2 RBI. Following the 2024 season, Peguero played winter league baseball for the Tigres del Licey of the Dominican Professional Baseball League.

Peguero was optioned to Triple-A Indianapolis to begin the 2025 season. On August 3, 2025, Peguero hit three home runs in a game against the Colorado Rockies, providing all of Pittsburgh's run in the 8–5 loss. In 33 appearances for Pittsburgh, he batted .200/.273/.363 with four home runs, eight RBI, and four stolen bases. On November 6, Peguero was removed from the 40-man roster and elected free agency.

=== Philadelphia Phillies ===
On November 19, 2025, Peguero agreed to a minor league contract with the Philadelphia Phillies. He made 73 appearances split between the High–A Jersey Shore BlueClaws and Triple–A Lehigh Valley IronPigs, batting a combined .247/.333/.347 with one home run, 36 RBI, and seven stolen bases. Peguero was released by the Phillies organization on August 4, 2026.

=== Washington Nationals ===
On August 13, 2026, Peguero signed a minor league contract with the Washington Nationals. He was assigned to the Triple-A Rochester Red Wings. In 30 games with Triple-A Rochester Red Wings he batted .230/.336/.380 with 3 home runs, 17 RBIs and 3 stolen bases. He elected free agency on November 2.

== Personal life ==
Peguero began teaching himself the English language as a child in the Dominican Republic by listening to hip hop music, reading the lyrics and then translating them into Spanish. Before his first minor league season began, he realized that he had become fluent in English without having taken a single class when he was able to carry on a conversation with fellow Diamondbacks minor leaguer Pavin Smith.

== See also ==
- List of Major League Baseball players from the Dominican Republic
