= Brennan Malone =

American baseball player (born 2000)

Free agent
- Pitcher
- Born: September 8, 2000 (age 26); Matthews, North Carolina, U.S.
- Bats: Right Throws: Right

Brennan Russell Malone (born September 8, 2000) is an American professional baseball pitcher who is a free agent.

== Amateur career ==
Malone attended Porter Ridge High School in Indian Trail, North Carolina before transferring to IMG Academy in Bradenton, Florida for his senior year. At IMG, he was recorded throwing as high as 97 miles per hour. He committed to play college baseball at the University of North Carolina.

== Professional career ==
=== Arizona Diamondbacks ===
Malone was selected by the Arizona Diamondbacks in the first round of the 2019 Major League Baseball draft, making him one of only three high school pitchers selected in the first round of the 2019 draft. He signed for $2.2 million. After signing, he was assigned to the Arizona League Diamondbacks, going 1–2 with a 5.14 ERA over seven innings. He also pitched in one game for the Hillsboro Hops at the end of the year.

=== Pittsburgh Pirates ===
On January 27, 2020, the Diamondbacks traded Malone and Liover Peguero to the Pittsburgh Pirates in exchange for Starling Marte and cash considerations. He did not play in a game in 2020 due to the cancellation of the minor league season because of the COVID-19 pandemic. Malone missed a majority of the 2021 season due to a lat injury, and pitched only 14 innings for the year for the rookie-level Florida Complex League Pirates and Single-A Bradenton Marauders.

Malone returned to the FCL Pirates and Bradenton in 2022, but made just three appearances before being placed on the injured list in mid-June due to shoulder soreness. On August 16, 2022, Malone underwent season-ending surgery to repair damage to his right labral tissue; the procedure also caused him to miss the entirety of the 2023 campaign. He returned to action in 2024 with the FCL Pirates, posting a 4.15 ERA across 10 appearances.

Malone made 25 appearances for Bradenton during the 2025 campaign, compiling a 1-0 record and 4.45 ERA with 26 strikeouts across 28 1/3 innings pitched. He elected free agency following the season on November 6, 2025.
